= 2025 New York Film Critics Online Awards =

25th New York Film Critics Online Awards

25th New York Film Critics Online Awards
- Date: December 15, 2025

Highlights
- Best Film: One Battle After Another
- Best Director: Ryan Coogler – Sinners
- Most awards: Sinners (4)
- Most nominations: One Battle After Another (12)

The 25th New York Film Critics Online Awards, honoring the best in filmmaking in 2025, were given on December 15, 2025.

The nominations were announced on December 8, 2025. Paul Thomas Anderson's action thriller One Battle After Another led the nominations with twelve, followed by Hamnet, Sentimental Value and Sinners all with ten nods each.

== Winners and nominees ==
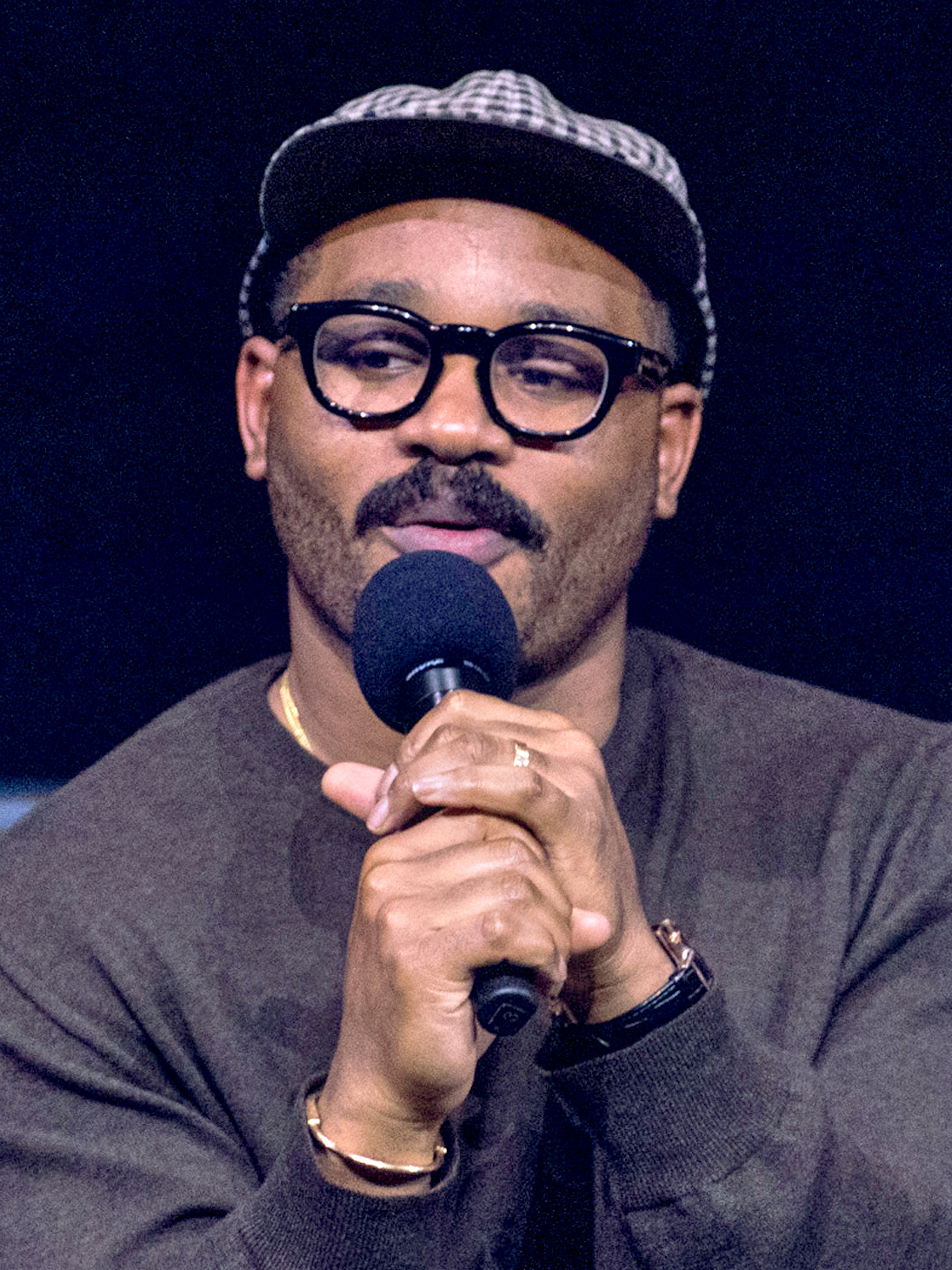
Ryan Coogler, Best Director winner

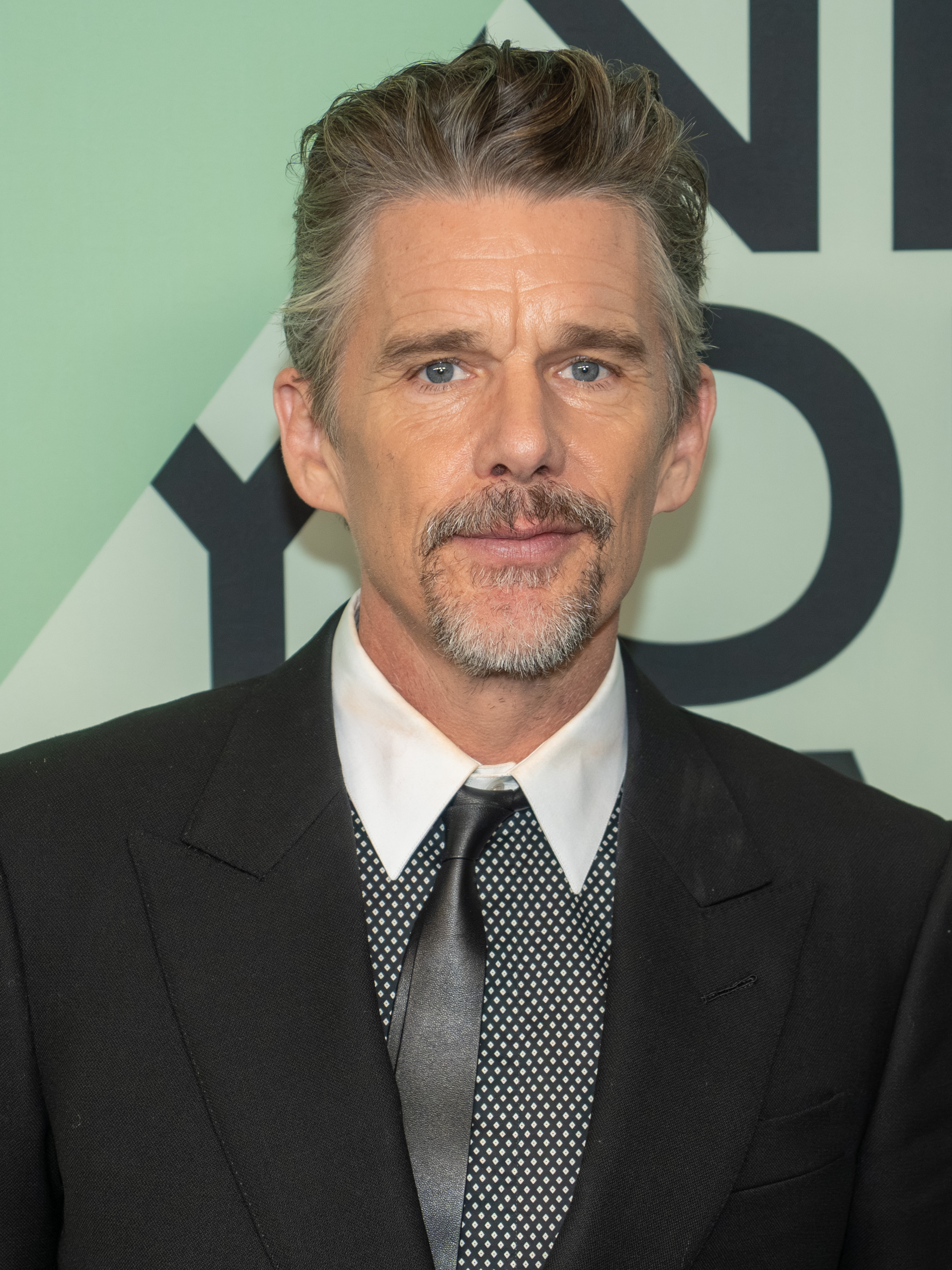
Ethan Hawke, Best Actor winner

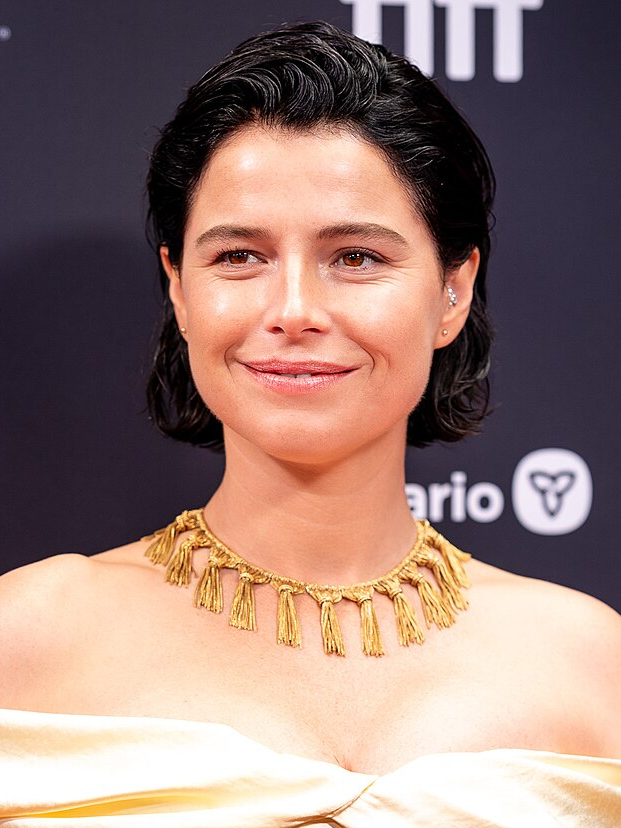
Jessie Buckley, Best Actress winner

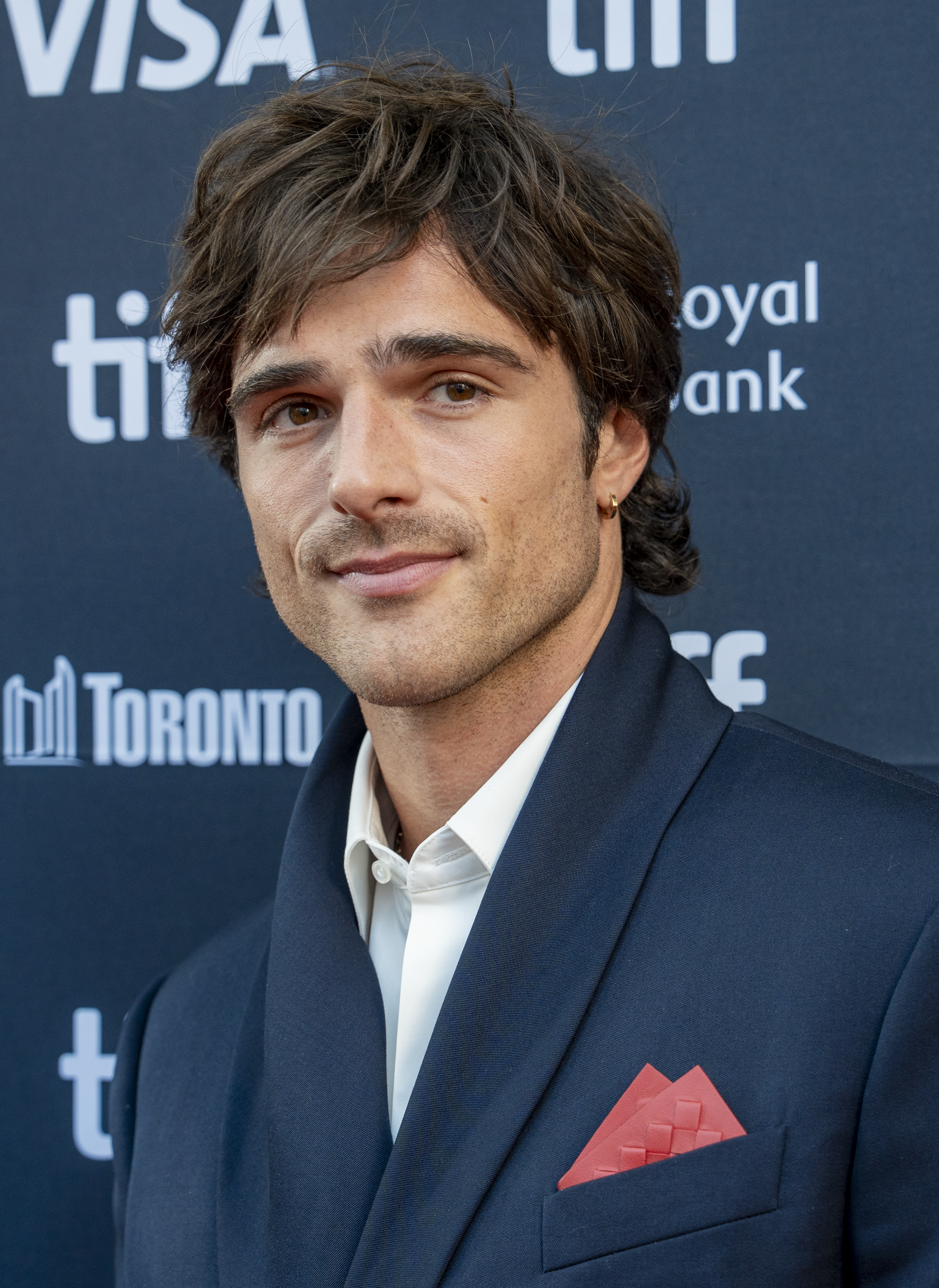
Jacob Elordi, Best Supporting Actor winner

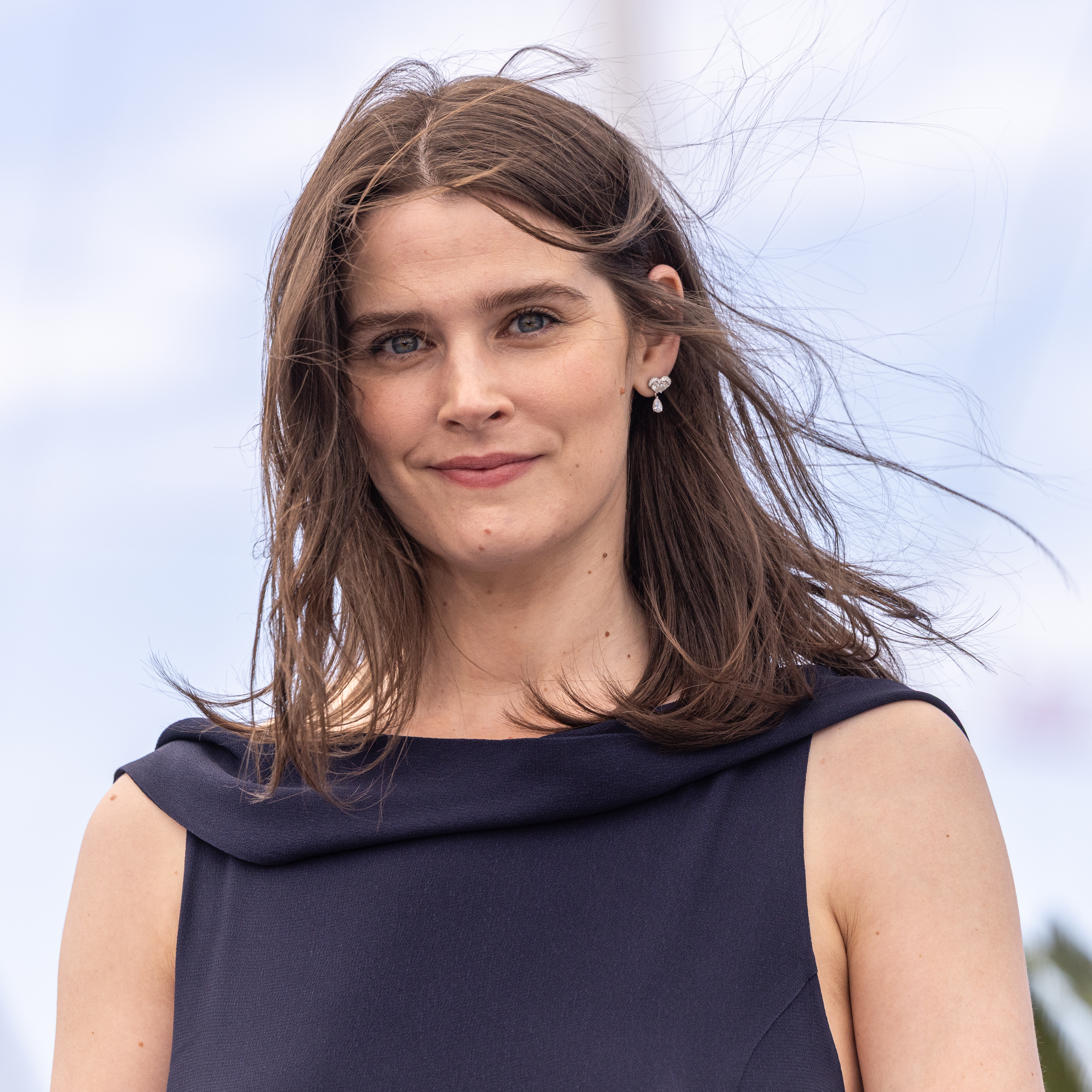
Inga Ibsdotter Lilleaas, Best Supporting Actress winner

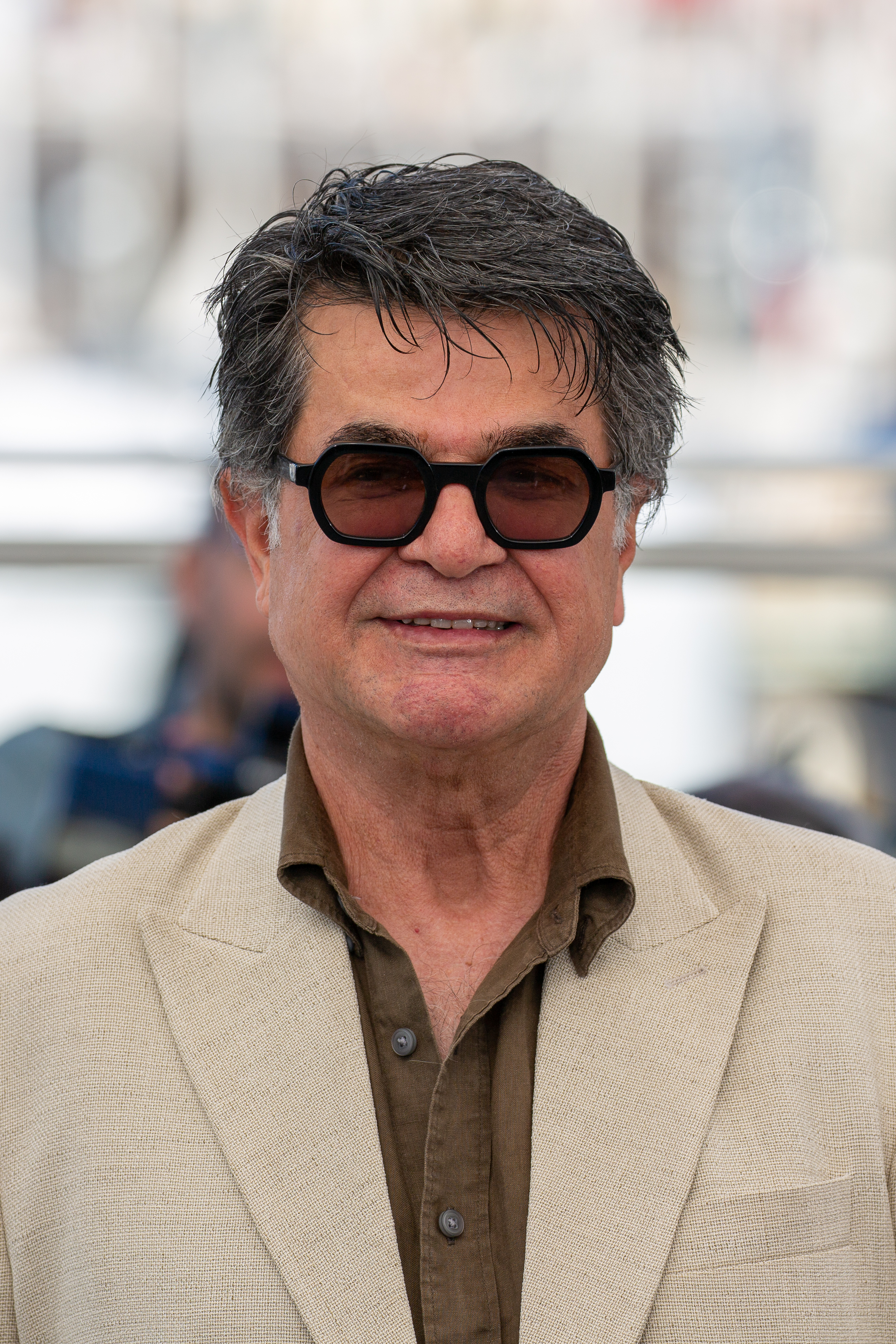
Jafar Panahi, Best Screenplay winner

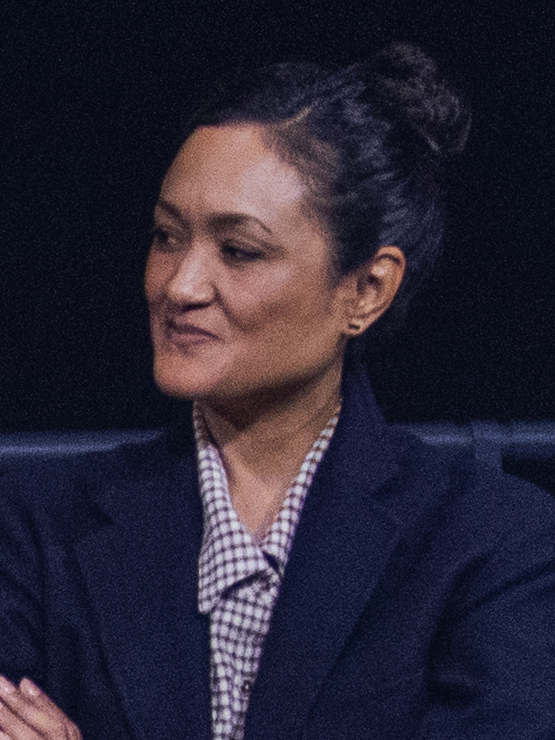
Autumn Durald Arkapaw, Best Cinematography winner

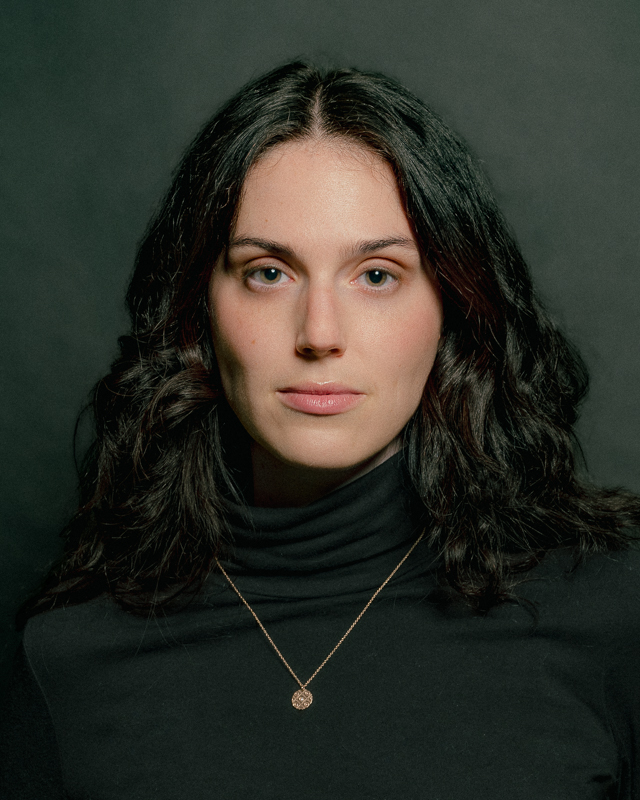
Eva Victor, Best Debut Director winner

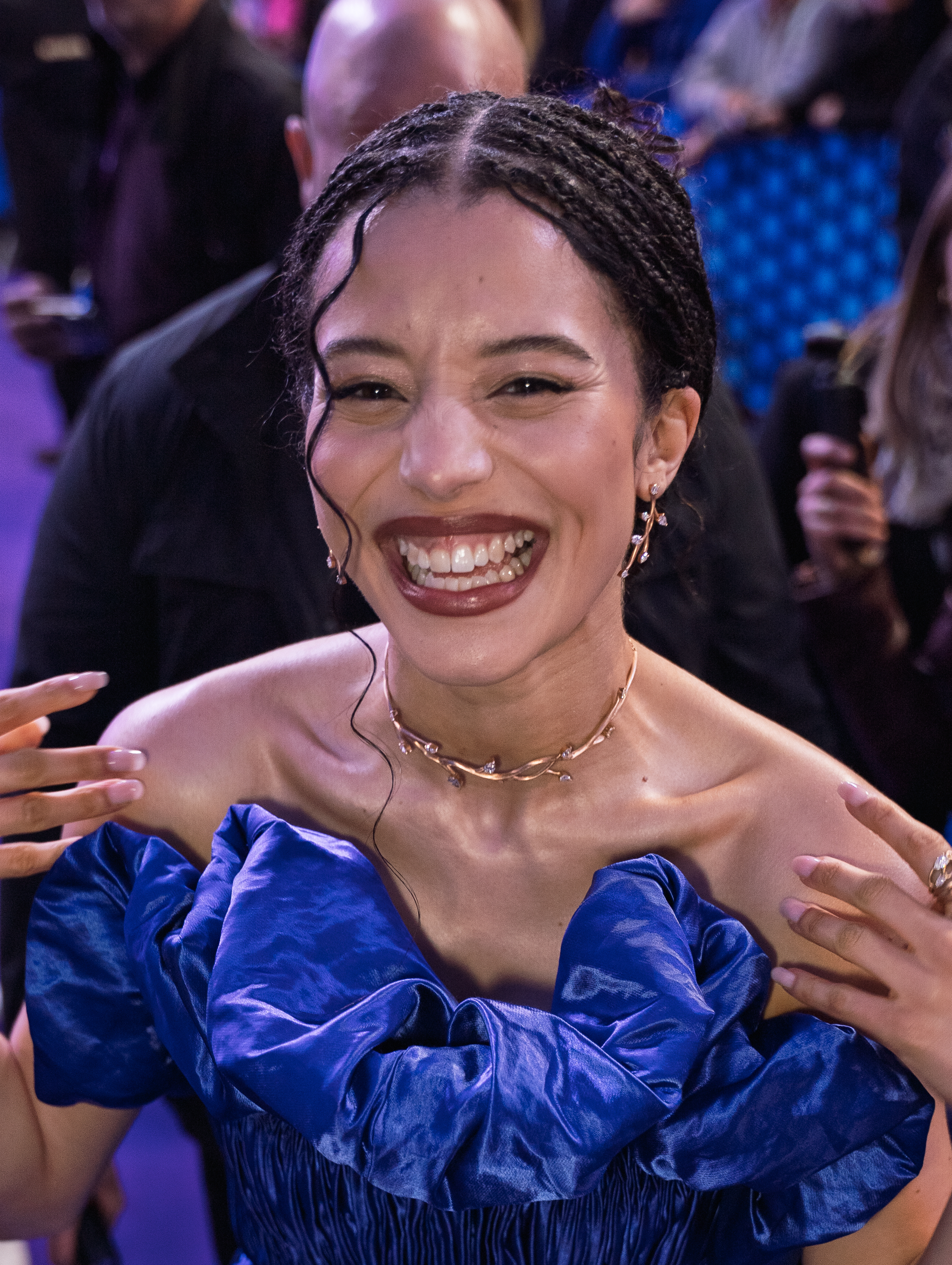
Chase Infiniti, Best Breakthrough Performer winner

Winners are listed first and in boldface, followed by the runner-ups and nominees

Best Picture	Best Director
**One Battle After Another**; Runner-up: Sinners; Hamnet; If I Had Legs I'd Kick You; It Was Just an Accident; Marty Supreme; No Other Choice; Nuremberg; Sentimental Value; Train Dreams	**Ryan Coogler – Sinners**; Runner-up: Paul Thomas Anderson – One Battle After Another; Park Chan-wook – No Other Choice; Mona Fastvold – The Testament of Ann Lee; Oliver Laxe – Sirāt; Jafar Panahi – It Was Just an Accident; Lynne Ramsay – Die My Love; Josh Safdie – Marty Supreme; Joachim Trier – Sentimental Value; Chloé Zhao – Hamnet
Best Actor	Best Actress
**Ethan Hawke – Blue Moon as Lorenz Hart**; Runner-up: Timothée Chalamet – Marty Supreme as Marty Mauser; Leonardo DiCaprio – One Battle After Another as Bob Ferguson; Sope Dirisu – My Father's Shadow as Folarin; Joel Edgerton – Train Dreams as Robert Grainier; Lee Byung-hun – No Other Choice as Yoo Man-su; Michael B. Jordan – Sinners as Elijah "Smoke" Moore / Elias "Stack" Moore; Wagner Moura – The Secret Agent as Marcelo Alves / Armando Solimões / Fernando Solimões; Dylan O'Brien – Twinless as Roman / Rocky; Jesse Plemons – Bugonia as Teddy Gatz	**Jessie Buckley – Hamnet as Agnes Shakespeare**; Runner-up: Rose Byrne – If I Had Legs I'd Kick You as Linda; Kathleen Chalfant – Familiar Touch as Ruth; Kate Hudson – Song Sung Blue as Claire Sardina / "Thunder"; Jennifer Lawrence – Die My Love as Grace; Renate Reinsve – Sentimental Value as Nora Borg; Amanda Seyfried – The Testament of Ann Lee as Ann Lee; Emma Stone – Bugonia as Michelle Fuller; Sydney Sweeney – Christy as Christy Martin; Tessa Thompson – Hedda as Hedda Gabler
Best Supporting Actor	Best Supporting Actress
**Jacob Elordi – Frankenstein as The Creature**; Runner-up: Stellan Skarsgård – Sentimental Value as Gustav Borg; Michael Cera – The Phoenician Scheme as Bjørn Lund / Bjørn Carlson; Benicio del Toro – One Battle After Another as Sensei Sergio St. Carlos; Noah Jupe – Hamnet as Hamlet; Delroy Lindo – Sinners as Delta Slim; Pierre Lottin – When Fall Is Coming as Vincent Perrin; Paul Mescal – Hamnet as William Shakespeare; Sean Penn – One Battle After Another as Col. Steven J. Lockjaw; Adam Sandler – Jay Kelly as Ron Sukenick; Alexander Skarsgård – Pillion as Ray	**Inga Ibsdotter Lilleaas – Sentimental Value as Agnes Borg Pettersen**; Runner-up: Amy Madigan – Weapons as Gladys; Odessa A'zion – Marty Supreme as Rachel Mizler; Glenn Close – Wake Up Dead Man as Martha Delacroix; Elle Fanning – Sentimental Value as Rachel Kemp; Ariana Grande – Wicked: For Good as Galinda "Glinda" Upland; Regina Hall – One Battle After Another as Deandra / Lady Champagne; Wunmi Mosaku – Sinners as Annie; Da'Vine Joy Randolph – Eternity as Anna; Teyana Taylor – One Battle After Another as Perfidia Beverly Hills
Best Screenplay	Best Ensemble Cast
**It Was Just an Accident – Jafar Panahi**; Runner-up: Sentimental Value – Eskil Vogt and Joachim Trier; Bugonia – Will Tracy; Hamnet – Chloé Zhao and Maggie O'Farrell; If I Had Legs I'd Kick You – Mary Bronstein; Marty Supreme – Ronald Bronstein and Josh Safdie; One Battle After Another – Paul Thomas Anderson; Sinners – Ryan Coogler; Sorry, Baby – Eva Victor; Train Dreams – Clint Bentley and Greg Kwedar; Twinless – James Sweeney	**Sinners**; Runner-up: One Battle After Another; Avatar: Fire and Ash; Hamnet; It Was Just an Accident; Marty Supreme; No Other Choice; Sentimental Value; The Testament of Ann Lee; Wake Up Dead Man
Best Cinematography	Best Use of Music
**Sinners – Autumn Durald Arkapaw**; Runner-up: Train Dreams – Adolpho Veloso; 28 Years Later – Anthony Dod Mantle; Avatar: Fire and Ash – Russell Carpenter; Frankenstein – Dan Laustsen; Hamnet – Łukasz Żal; No Other Choice – Kim Woo-hyung; One Battle After Another – Michael Bauman; Sirāt – Mauro Herce; The Testament of Ann Lee – William Rexer; Wicked: For Good – Alice Brooks	**Sinners**; Runner-up: Sirāt; Hamnet; KPop Demon Hunters; Marty Supreme; One Battle After Another; Song Sung Blue; Springsteen: Deliver Me from Nowhere; The Testament of Ann Lee; Wicked: For Good
Best Debut Director	Best Breakthrough Performer
**Eva Victor – Sorry, Baby**; Runner-up: Charlie Polinger – The Plague; Akinola Davies Jr. – My Father's Shadow; Harris Dickinson – Urchin; Sarah Friedland – Familiar Touch; Scarlett Johansson – Eleanor the Great; Harry Lighton – Pillion; Carson Lund – Eephus; Kristen Stewart – The Chronology of Water; Constance Tsang – Blue Sun Palace	**Chase Infiniti – One Battle After Another as Willa Ferguson**; Runner-up: Miles Caton – Sinners as Samuel "Sammie" Moore; Odessa A'zion – Marty Supreme as Rachel Mizler; Everett Blunck – The Plague as Ben; Jacobi Jupe – Hamnet as Hamnet Shakespeare; Inga Ibsdotter Lilleaas – Sentimental Value as Agnes Borg Pettersen; Kayo Martin – The Plague as Jake; Abou Sangaré – Souleymane's Story as Souleymane; Eva Victor – Sorry, Baby as Agnes
Best Animation	Best International Feature
**Arco**; Runner-up: Little Amélie or the Character of Rain (TIE); Runner-up: Zootopia 2 (TIE); 100 Meters; Elio; KPop Demon Hunters; A Magnificent Life; Predator: Killer of Killers; Scarlet	**It Was Just an Accident • Iran**; Runner-up: Sentimental Value • Norway; Left-Handed Girl • Taiwan; No Other Choice • South Korea; Resurrection • China; The Secret Agent • Brazil; Sirāt • Spain; Sound of Falling • Germany; The Voice of Hind Rajab • Tunisia; We Shall Not Be Moved • Mexico
Best Documentary
**BLKNWS: Terms & Conditions**; Runner-up: The Perfect Neighbor; 2000 Meters to Andriivka; Afternoons of Solitude; The Alabama Solution; Come See Me in the Good Light; Cover-Up; My Undesirable Friends: Part I — Last Air in Moscow; Pee-wee as Himself; Put Your Soul on Your Hand and Walk
