= 41st Independent Spirit Awards =

US film awards ceremony in 2026

41st Film Independent Spirit Awards
- Awarded for: Best in independent film and independent television
- Date: February 15, 2026
- Site: Hollywood Palladium; Los Angeles, California, U.S.
- Hosted by: Ego Nwodim

Highlights
- Best Feature: Train Dreams
- Most awards: Film: Train Dreams (3); TV: Adolescence (4)
- Most nominations: Film: Peter Hujar's Day (5); TV: Adolescence (4)

Television coverage
- Network: YouTube (through @filmindependent + @imdb)

The 41st Film Independent Spirit Awards, honoring the best independent films and television series of 2025, were presented by Film Independent on February 15, 2026. The ceremony was held at the Hollywood Palladium in Los Angeles, California, and hosted by American actress and comedian Ego Nwodim. It was streamed live on the YouTube channels of both IMDb and Film Independent, and across Film Independent's social media platforms.

The nominations were announced live via YouTube on December 3, 2025. Peter Hujar's Day led the film nominations with five. For television, Adolescence, Forever, and Mr Loverman received the most nominations with four each.

The grant recipients of the Emerging Filmmakers Awards were announced on January 10, 2026.

== Changes ==
In May 2025, Film Independent announced that the ceremony venue would move from the Santa Monica Pier to the Hollywood Palladium. This move came as Santa Monica, the former longtime home of the Film Independent Spirit Awards, underwent renovations.

== Winners and nominees ==
=== Film ===
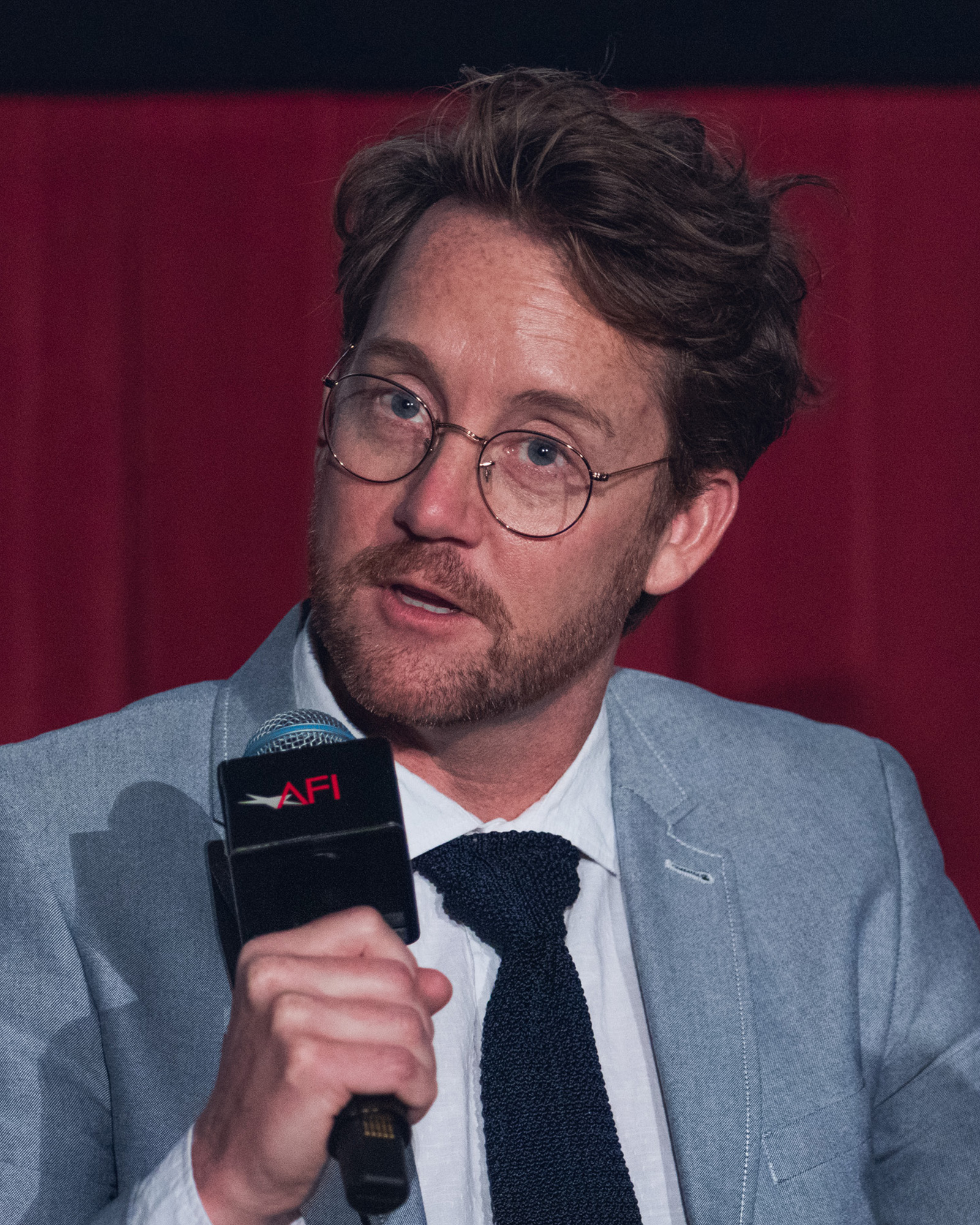
Clint Bentley, Best Director winner

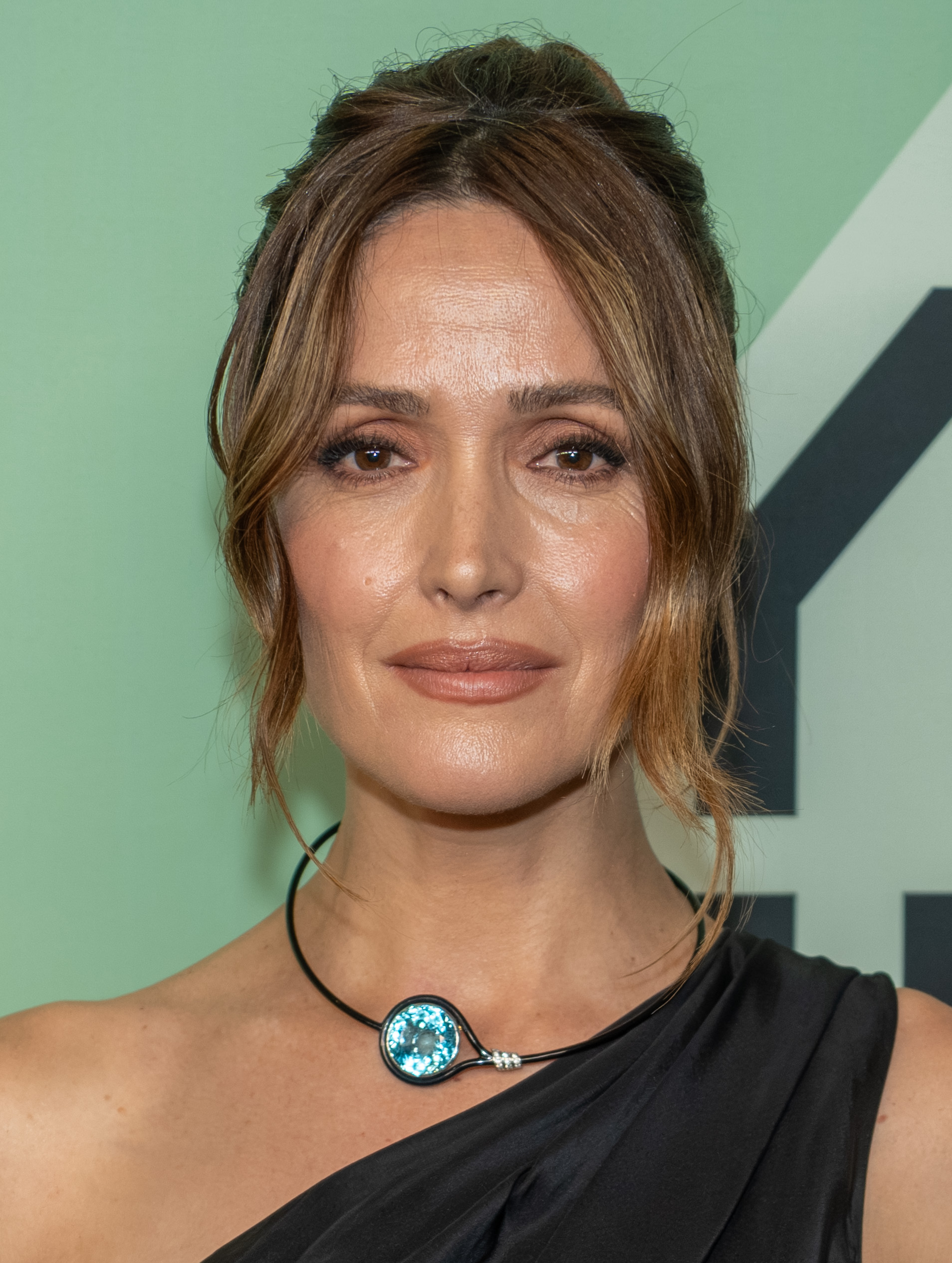
Rose Byrne, Best Lead Performance winner

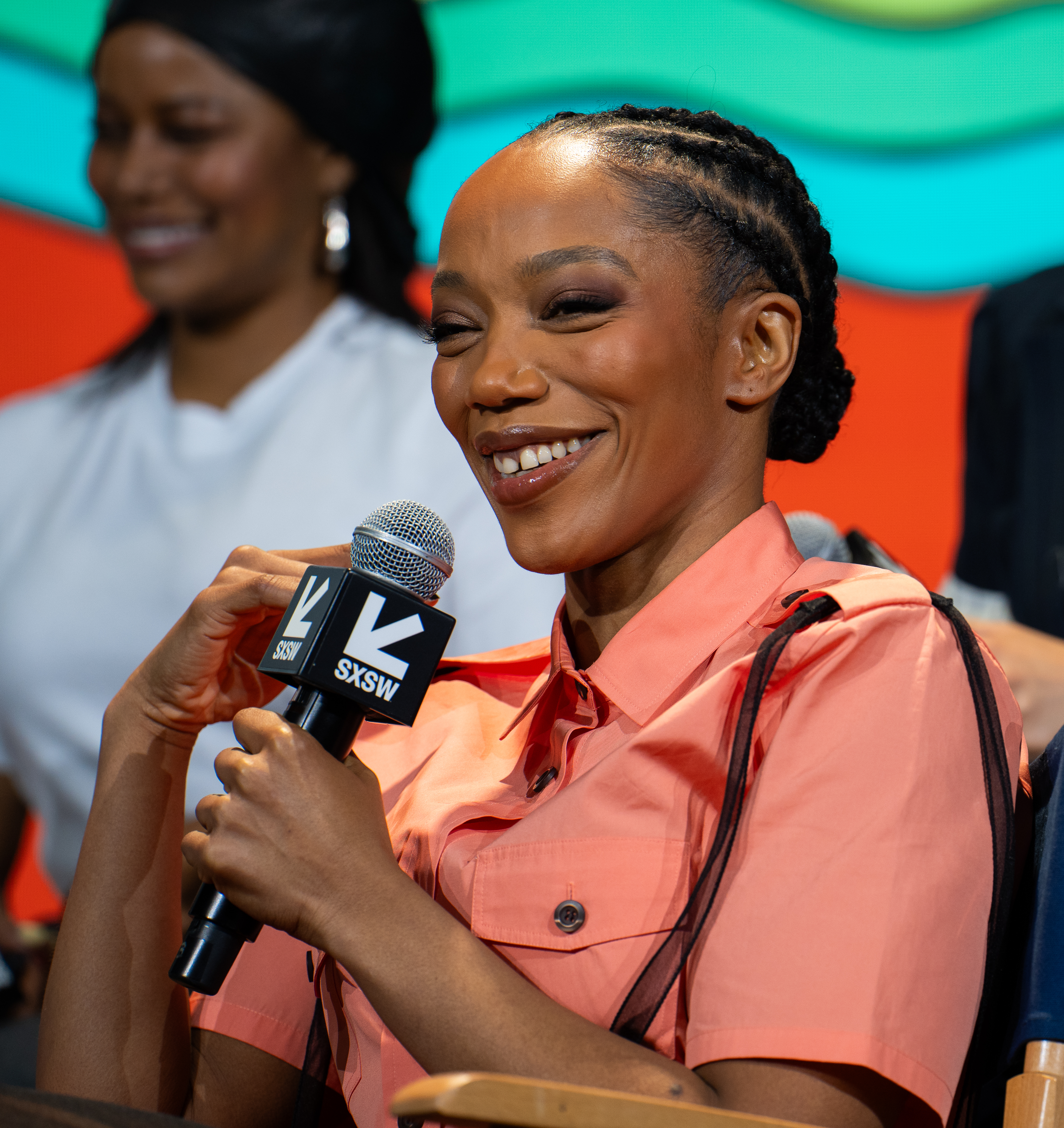
Naomi Ackie, Best Supporting Performance winner

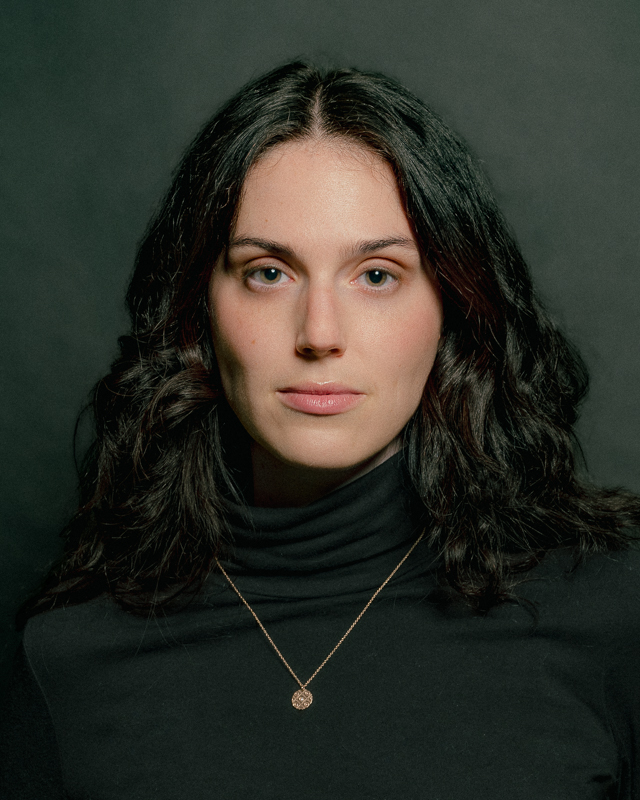
Eva Victor, Best Screenplay winner

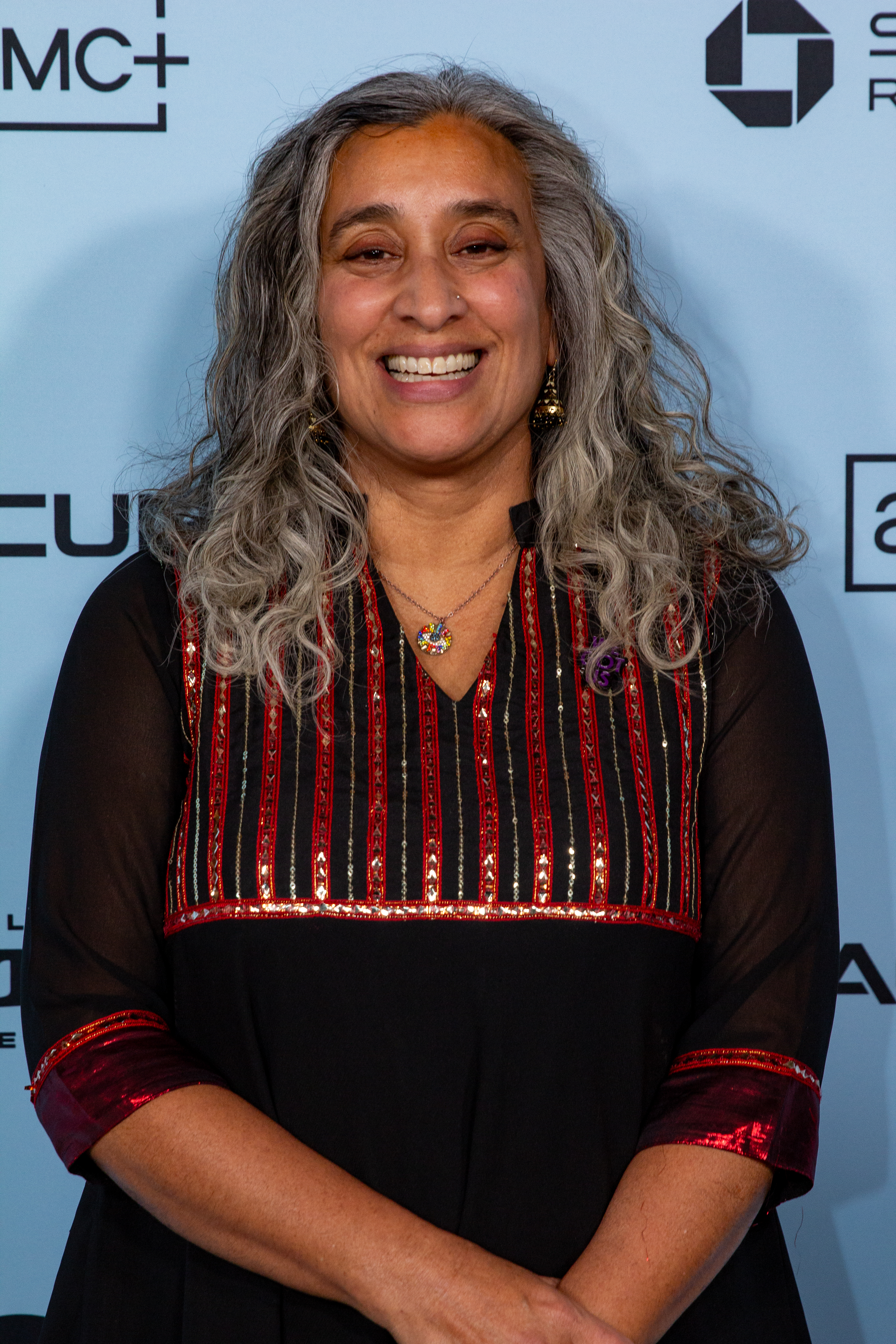
Geeta Gandbhir, Best Documentary Feature co-winner

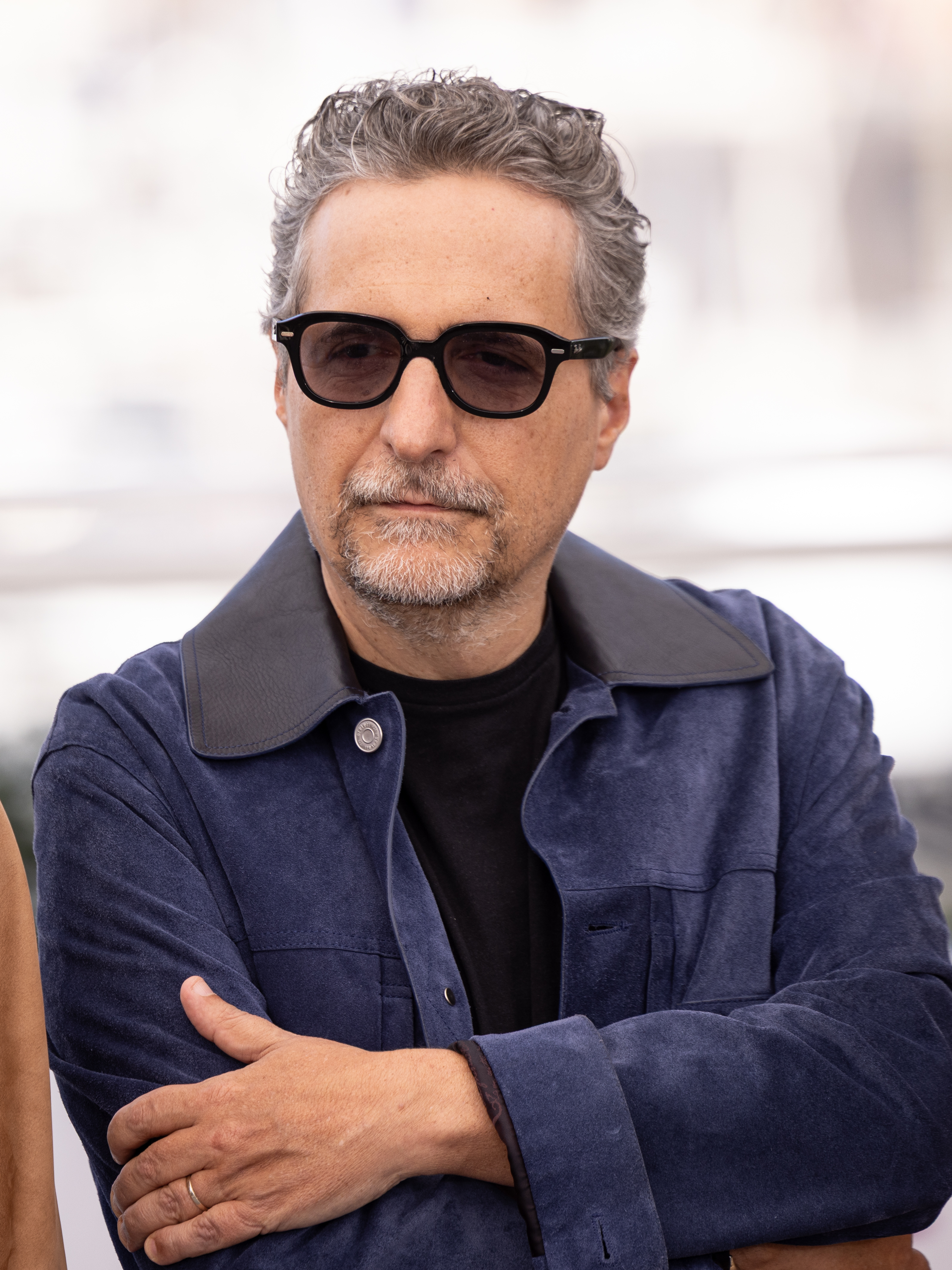
Kleber Mendonça Filho, Best International Film winner

Best Feature	Best Director
Train Dreams – Michael Heimler, Will Janowitz, Marissa McMahon, Ashley Schlaifer, and Teddy Schwarzman; Peter Hujar's Day – Jonah Disend and Jordan Drake; The Plague – Derek Dauchy, Joel Edgerton, Roy Lee, Lucy McKendrick, Steven Schneider, and Lizzie Shapiro; Sorry, Baby – Mark Ceryak, Barry Jenkins, and Adele Romanski; Twinless – David Permut and James Sweeney	Clint Bentley – Train Dreams; Mary Bronstein – If I Had Legs I'd Kick You; Lloyd Lee Choi – Lucky Lu; Ira Sachs – Peter Hujar's Day; Eva Victor – Sorry, Baby
Best Lead Performance	Best Supporting Performance
Rose Byrne – If I Had Legs I'd Kick You as Linda; Everett Blunck – The Plague as Ben; Kathleen Chalfant – Familiar Touch as Ruth; Chang Chen – Lucky Lu as Lu Jia Cheng; Joel Edgerton – Train Dreams as Robert Grainier; Dylan O'Brien – Twinless as Roman / Rocky; Keke Palmer – One of Them Days as Dreux; Théodore Pellerin – Lurker as Matthew Morning; Tessa Thompson – Hedda as Hedda Gabler; Ben Whishaw – Peter Hujar's Day as Peter Hujar	Naomi Ackie – Sorry, Baby as Lydie; Zoey Deutch – Nouvelle Vague as Jean Seberg; Kirsten Dunst – Roofman as Leigh Wainscott; Rebecca Hall – Peter Hujar's Day as Linda Rosenkrantz; Nina Hoss – Hedda as Eileen Lovborg; Jane Levy – A Little Prayer as Tammy; Archie Madekwe – Lurker as Oliver; Kali Reis – Rebuilding as Mila; Jacob Tremblay – Sovereign as Joe Kane; Haipeng Xu – Blue Sun Palace as Didi
Best Breakthrough Performance	Best Screenplay
Kayo Martin – The Plague as Jake; Liz Larsen – The Baltimorons as Didi; Misha Osherovich – She's the He as Ethan; SZA – One of Them Days as Alyssa; Tabatha Zimiga – East of Wall as herself	Sorry, Baby – Eva Victor; A Little Prayer – Angus MacLachlan; Sovereign – Christian Swegal; Splitsville – Michael Angelo Covino and Kyle Marvin; Twinless – James Sweeney
Best First Feature	Best First Screenplay
Lurker – Alex Russell (director); Galen Core, Archie Madekwe, Marc Marrie, Charlie McDowell, Francesco Melzi D'Eril, Duncan Montgomery, Alex Orlovsky, Olmo Schnabel, and Jack Selby (producers); Blue Sun Palace – Constance Tsang (director); Sally Sujin Oh, Eli Raskin, and Tony Yang (producers); Dust Bunny – Bryan Fuller (director/producer); Basil Iwanyk and Erica Lee (producers); East of Wall – Kate Beecroft (director/producer); Shannon Moss, Melanie Ramsayer, and Lila Yacoub (producers); One of Them Days – Lawrence Lamont (director); Deniese Davis, Poppy Hanks, James Lopez, Issa Rae, and Sara Rastogi (producers)	Lurker – Alex Russell; Blue Sun Palace – Constance Tsang; Friendship – Andrew DeYoung; One of Them Days – Syreeta Singleton; Outerlands – Elena Oxman
Best Documentary Feature	Best International Film
The Perfect Neighbor – Geeta Gandbhir (director/producer); Sam Bisbee, Nikon Kwantu, and Alisa Payne (producers); Come See Me in the Good Light – Ryan White (director/producer); Jessica Hargrave, Tig Notaro, and Stef Willen (producers); Endless Cookie – Peter Scriver (director); Seth Scriver (director/producer); Daniel Bekerman, Alex Ordanis, Jason Ryle, and Chris Yurkovich (producers); My Undesirable Friends: Part I — Last Air in Moscow – Julia Loktev (director/producer); The Tale of Silyan – Tamara Kotevska (director/producer); Jean Dakar, Anna Hashmi, and Jordanco Petkovski (producers)	The Secret Agent (Brazil) – Kleber Mendonça Filho (director); All That's Left of You (Palestine, Jordan, Germany, Cyprus) – Cherien Dabis (director); On Becoming a Guinea Fowl (Zambia, UK, Ireland) – Rungano Nyoni (director); A Poet (Colombia) – Simón Mesa Soto (director); Sirāt (Spain) – Oliver Laxe (director)
Best Cinematography	Best Editing
Adolpho Veloso – Train Dreams; Alex Ashe – Peter Hujar's Day; Norm Li – Blue Sun Palace; David J. Thompson – Warfare; Nicole Hirsch Whitaker – Dust Bunny	Sofía Subercaseaux – The Testament of Ann Lee; Ben Leonberg – Good Boy; Carson Lund – Eephus; Fin Oates – Warfare; Sara Shaw – Splitsville

==== Films with multiple nominations and awards ====
Films that received multiple nominations
Nominations	Film
5	Peter Hujar's Day
4	Blue Sun Palace
4	Lurker
4	One of Them Days
4	Sorry, Baby
4	Train Dreams
3	The Plague
3	Twinless
2	The Baltimorons
2	Dust Bunny
2	East of Wall
2	Eephus
2	Familiar Touch
2	Hedda
2	If I Had Legs I'd Kick You
2	A Little Prayer
2	Lucky Lu
2	Sovereign
2	Splitsville
2	Warfare

Films that won multiple awards
Awards	Film
3	Train Dreams
2	Lurker
2	Sorry, Baby

=== Television ===
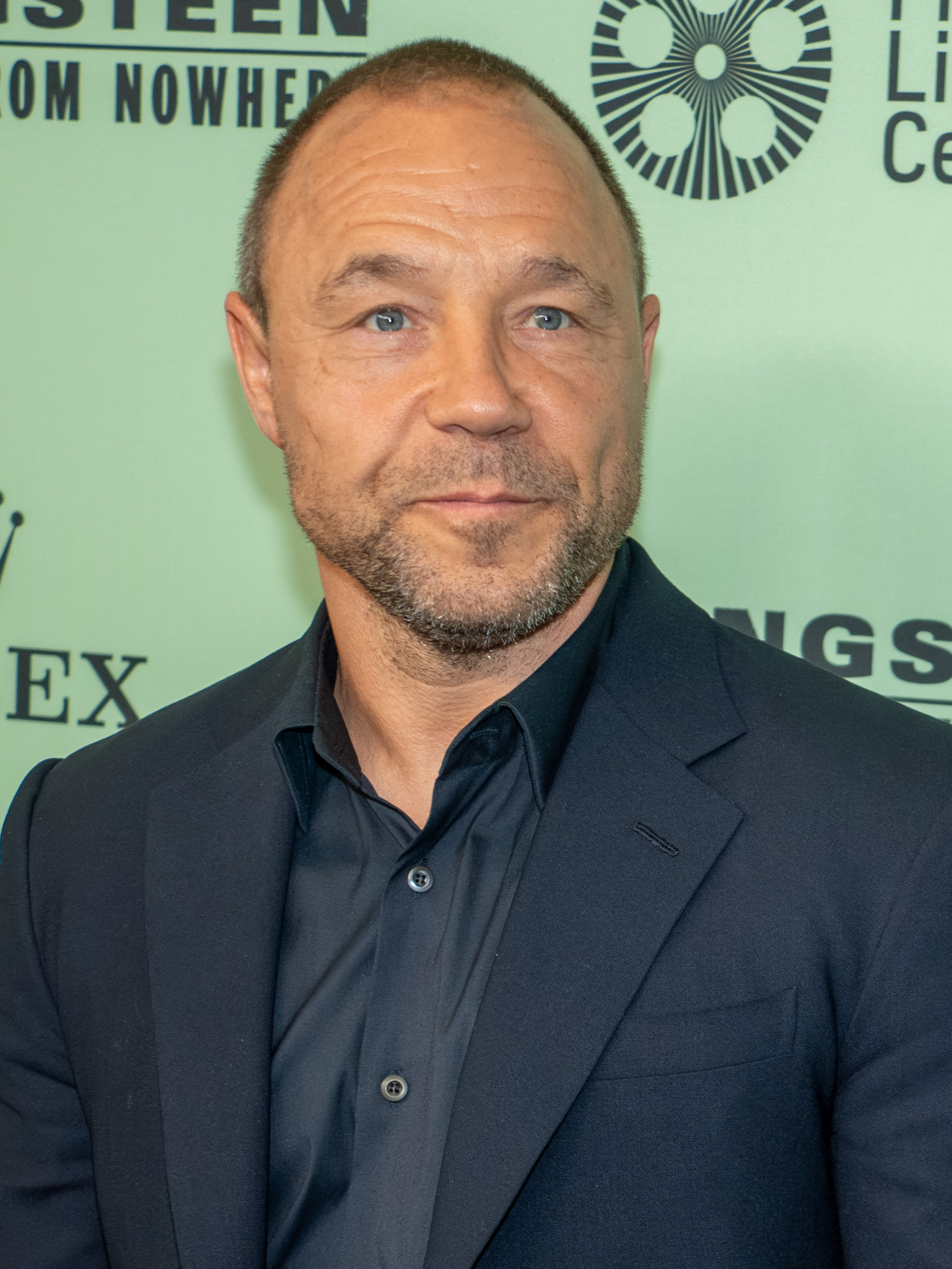
Stephen Graham, Best New Scripted Series co-winner and Best Lead Performance in a New Scripted Series winner

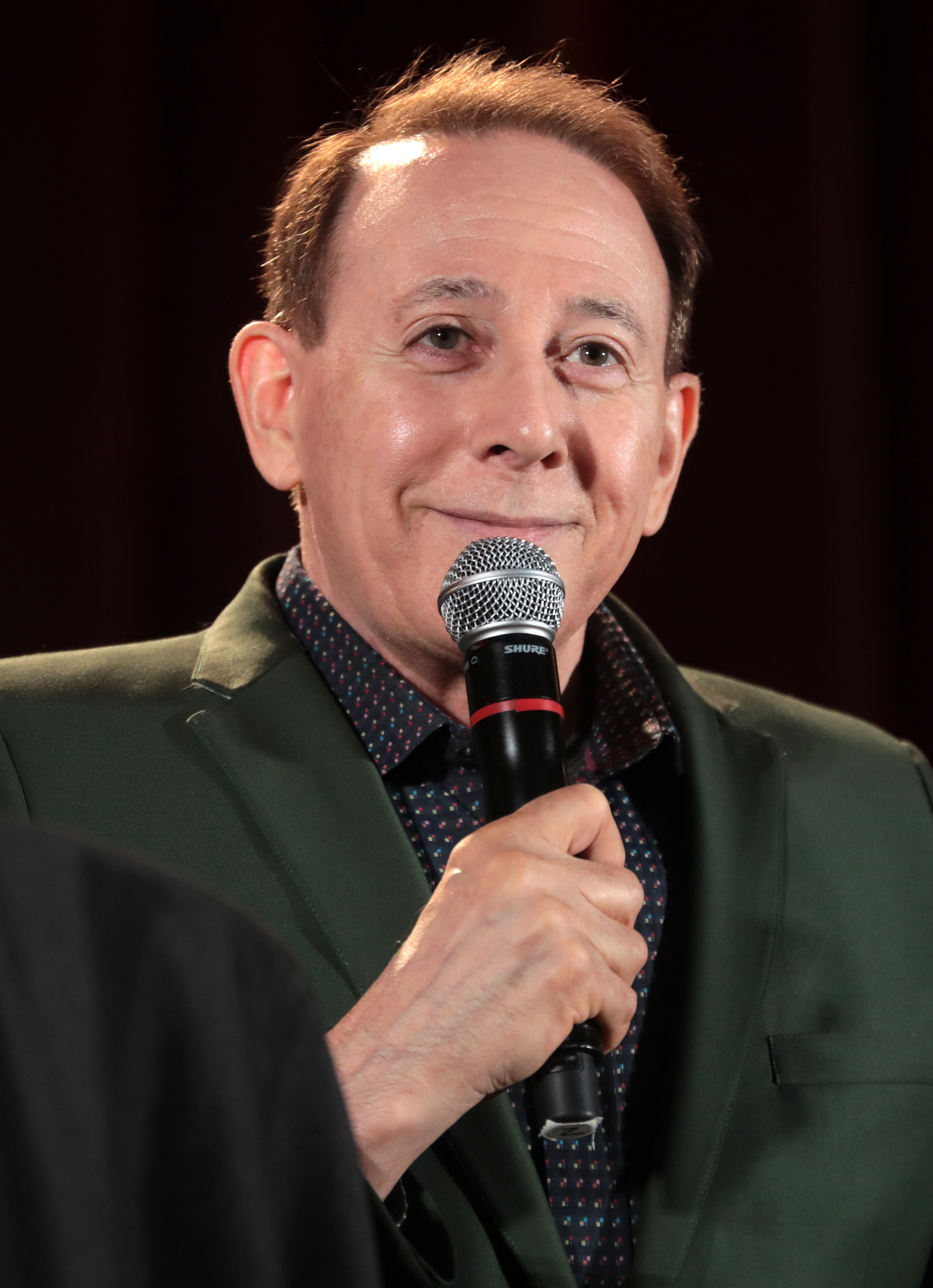
Paul Reubens, Best New Non-Scripted or Documentary Series co-winner

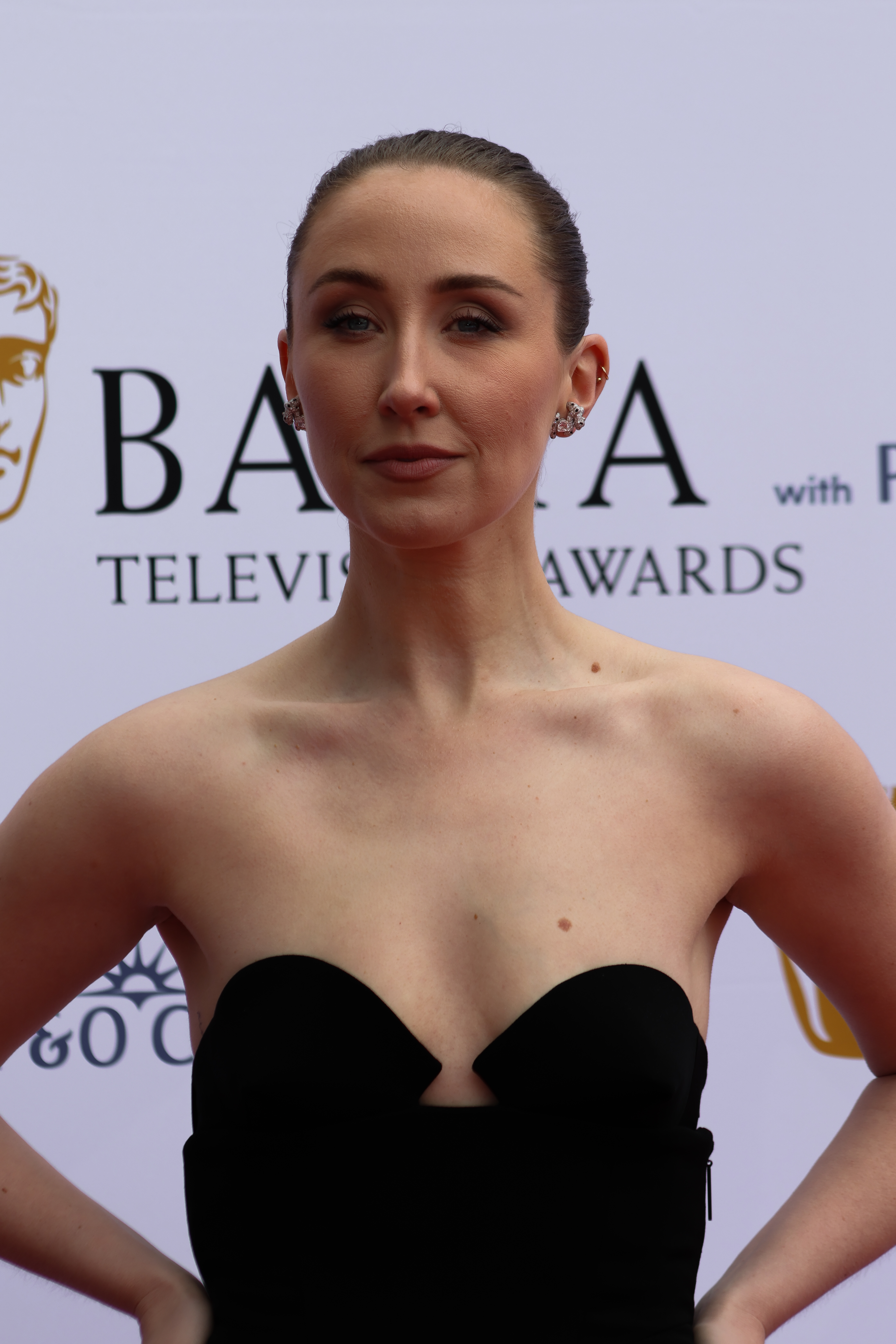
Erin Doherty, Best Supporting Performance in a New Scripted Series winner

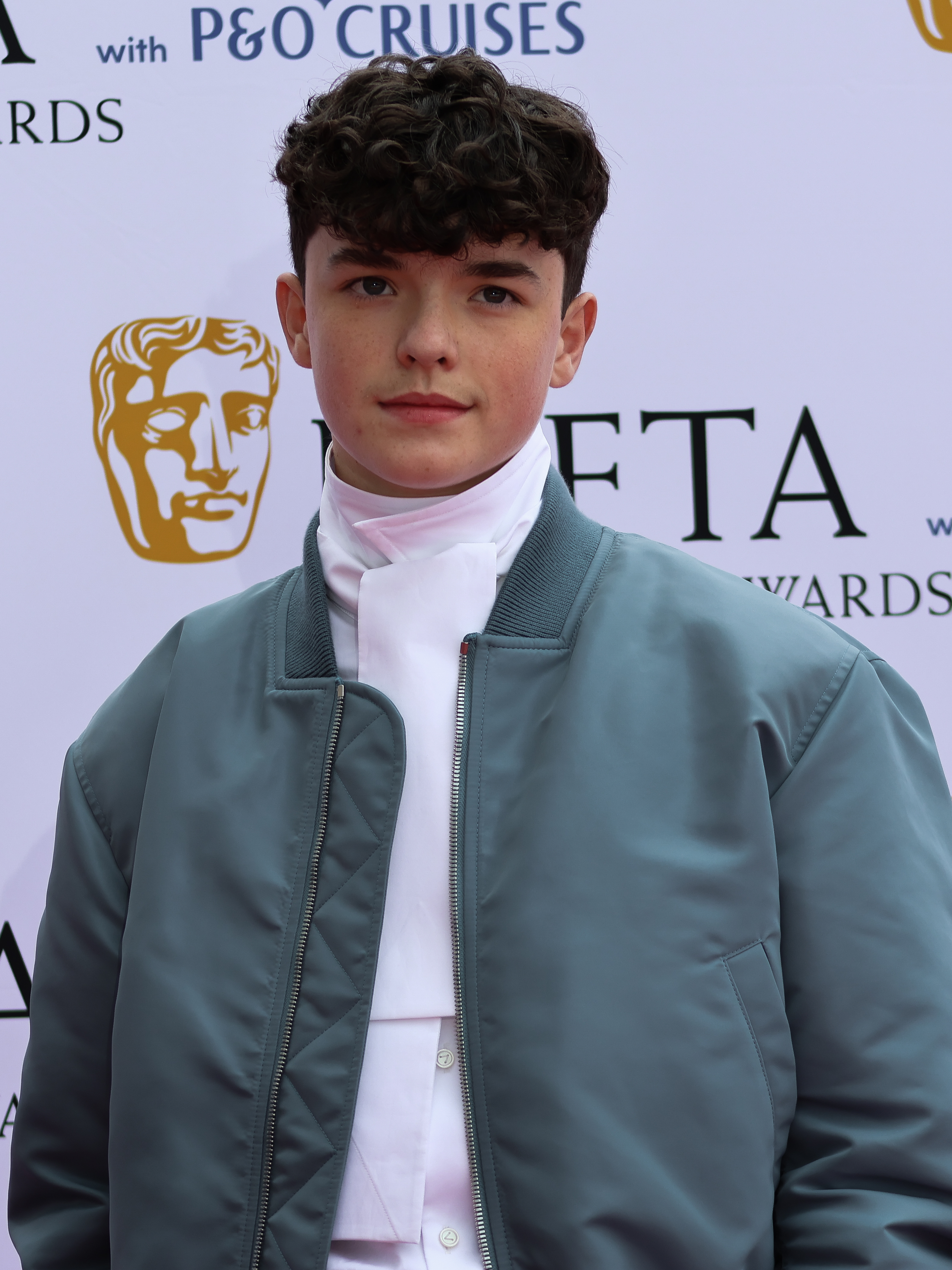
Owen Cooper, Best Breakthrough Performance in a New Scripted Series winner

Best New Scripted Series	Best New Non-Scripted or Documentary Series
Adolescence – Jack Thorne and Stephen Graham (creators/executive producers); Philip Barantini, Brad Pitt, Dede Gardner, Jeremy Kleiner, Nina Wolarsky, Hannah Walters, Mark Herbert, and Emily Feller (executive producers); Carina Sposato, Niall Shamma, and Peter Balm (co-executive producers) (Netflix); Common Side Effects – Joe Bennett and Steve Hely (creators/executive producers); Mike Judge, Greg Daniels, Dustin Davis, James Merrill, Sean Buckelew, Benjy Brooke, Kelly Crews, and Suzanna Makkos (executive producers); Dave King (co-executive producer) (Adult Swim); Forever – Mara Brock Akil (creator/executive producer); Regina King, Susie Fitzgerald, Shana C. Waterman, Reina King, Anthony Hemingway, Judy Blume, Erika Harrison, and Sara E. White (executive producers); Jerron Horton (co-executive producer) (Netflix); Mr Loverman – Lennie James, Hong Khaou, Jo McClellan, Faye Ward, Hannah Farrell, and Hannah Price (executive producers) (BritBox); North of North – Stacey Aglok MacDonald and Alethea Arnaquq-Baril (creators/executive producers); Garry Campbell, Anya Adams, Susan Coyne, and Miranda de Pencier (executive producers); Teresa M. Ho, Michael Goldbach, Kathryn Borel, and JP Larocque (co-executive producers) (Netflix)	Pee-wee as Himself – Matt Wolf, Emma Tillinger Koskoff, Ronald Bronstein, Eli Bush, Benny Safdie, Josh Safdie, Paul Reubens (posthumous), Candace Tomarken, Kyle Martin, Nancy Abraham, Lisa Heller, and Sara Rodriguez (executive producers) (HBO); Citizen Nation – Bret Sigler (creator); Christopher Buck and Kyra Darnton (executive producers) (PBS); Hurricane Katrina: Race Against Time – Jonathan Chinn, Simon Chinn, Ryan Coogler, Myles Estey, Ted Skillman, Zinzi Coogler, Sev Ohanian, Peter Nicks, Kalia King, Carolyn Payne, and Sean David Johnson (executive producers); Kelli Buchanan (co-executive producer) (National Geographic); Seen & Heard: The History of Black Television – Issa Rae, Montrel McKay, John Maggio, Rachel Dretzin, John Ealer, Jonathan Berry, Dave Becky, Nancy Abraham, Lisa Heller, and Sara Rodriguez (executive producers); Esther Dere and Zachary Herrmann (co-executive producers) (HBO); Vow of Silence: The Assassination of Annie Mae – Ezra Edelman, Caroline Waterlow, Amy Kaufman, Jake Gyllenhaal, and Riva Marker (executive producers); Mark Becker (co-executive producer) (Hulu)
Best Lead Performance in a New Scripted Series	Best Supporting Performance in a New Scripted Series
Stephen Graham – Adolescence as Eddie Miller (Netflix); Sydney Chandler – Alien: Earth as Wendy (FX / FX on Hulu); Ethan Hawke – The Lowdown as Lee Raybon (FX); Lennie James – Mr Loverman as Barrington Walker (BritBox); Anna Lambe – North of North as Siaja (Netflix); Lola Petticrew – Say Nothing as Dolours Price (FX on Hulu); Seth Rogen – The Studio as Matt Remick (Apple TV); Lovie Simone – Forever as Keisha Clark (Netflix); Michelle Williams – Dying for Sex as Molly Kochan (FX on Hulu); Noah Wyle – The Pitt as Dr. Michael "Robby" Robinavitch (HBO Max)	Erin Doherty – Adolescence as Briony Ariston (Netflix); Ariyon Bakare – Mr Loverman as Morris De La Roux (BritBox); Babou Ceesay – Alien: Earth as Morrow (FX / FX on Hulu); Sharon D. Clarke – Mr Loverman as Carmel Walker (BritBox); Taylor Dearden – The Pitt as Dr. Melissa "Mel" King (HBO Max); Stephen McKinley Henderson – A Man on the Inside as Calbert Graham (Netflix); Poorna Jagannathan – Deli Boys as Lucky (Hulu); Xosha Roquemore – Forever as Shelly (Netflix); Jenny Slate – Dying for Sex as Nikki Boyer (FX on Hulu); Ben Whishaw – Black Doves as Sam Young (Netflix)
Best Breakthrough Performance in a New Scripted Series	Best Ensemble Cast in a New Scripted Series
Owen Cooper – Adolescence as Jamie Miller (Netflix); Asif Ali – Deli Boys as Mir Dar (Hulu); Wally Baram – Overcompensating as Carmen Neil (Prime Video); Michael Cooper Jr. – Forever as Justin Edwards (Netflix); Ernest Kingsley Junior – Washington Black as George Washington "Wash" Black (Hulu)	Chief of War – Charlie Brumbly, Luciane Buchanan, Cliff Curtis, Brandon Finn, Moses Goods, Te Ao o Hinepehinga, Benjamin Hoetjes, Siua Ikale'o, Keala Kahuanui-Paleka, Mainei Kinimaka, Kaina Makua, Jason Momoa, Temuera Morrison, Te Kohe Tuhaka, and James Udom

==== Series with multiple nominations and awards ====
Series that received multiple nominations
Nominations	Series
4	Adolescence
4	Forever
4	Mr Loverman
2	Alien: Earth
2	Deli Boys
2	Dying for Sex
2	North of North
2	The Pitt

Series that won multiple awards
Awards	Series
4	Adolescence

== Special awards ==
=== John Cassavetes Award ===
- Esta Isla (This Island) – Cristian Carretero and Lorraine Jones Molina (directors/writers/producers); Kisha Tikina Burgos (writer)
  - The Baltimorons – Jay Duplass (director/writer/producer); Michael Strassner (writer/producer); David Bonnett Jr. and Drew Langer (producers)
  - Boys Go to Jupiter – Julian Glander (director/writer)
  - Eephus – Carson Lund (director/writer/producer); Michael Basta (writer/producer); Nate Fisher (writer); David Entin and Tyler Taormina (producers)
  - Familiar Touch – Sarah Friedland (director/writer/producer); Alexandra Byer and Matthew Thurm (producers)

=== Robert Altman Award ===
- The Long Walk – Director: Francis Lawrence; Casting Director: Rich Delia; Ensemble Cast: Judy Greer, Mark Hamill, Cooper Hoffman, David Jonsson, Tut Nyuot, Joshua Odjick, Charlie Plummer, Ben Wang, and Garrett Wareing

== Emerging Filmmakers Awards ==
=== Producers Award ===
The award honors emerging producers who, despite highly limited resources, demonstrate the creativity, tenacity and vision required to produce quality, independent films.

- Tony Yang
  - Emma Hannaway
  - Luca Intili

=== Someone to Watch Award ===
The award recognizes a talented filmmaker of singular vision who has not yet received appropriate recognition.

- Tatti Ribeiro – Valentina
  - Neo Sora – Happyend
  - Annapurna Sriram – Fucktoys

=== Truer than Fiction Award ===
The award is presented to an emerging director of non-fiction features who has not yet received significant recognition.

- Rajee Samarasinghe – Your Touch Makes Others Invisible
  - Tony Benna – André Is an Idiot
  - Brittany Shyne – Seeds

== Milestones ==
Unlike previous ceremonies (including the 40th ceremony where Best International Film winner Flow became the first animated feature to win a Film Independent Spirit Award in any category), three animated projects were nominated for major categories that year (Endless Cookie for Best Documentary Feature, Common Side Effects for Best New Scripted Series, and Boys Go to Jupiter for the John Cassavetes Award).

== See also ==
- 98th Academy Awards
- 83rd Golden Globe Awards
- 79th British Academy Film Awards
- 46th Golden Raspberry Awards
- 32nd Actor Awards
- 31st Critics' Choice Awards
