= Bombette Martin =

British-American skateboarder (born 2006)

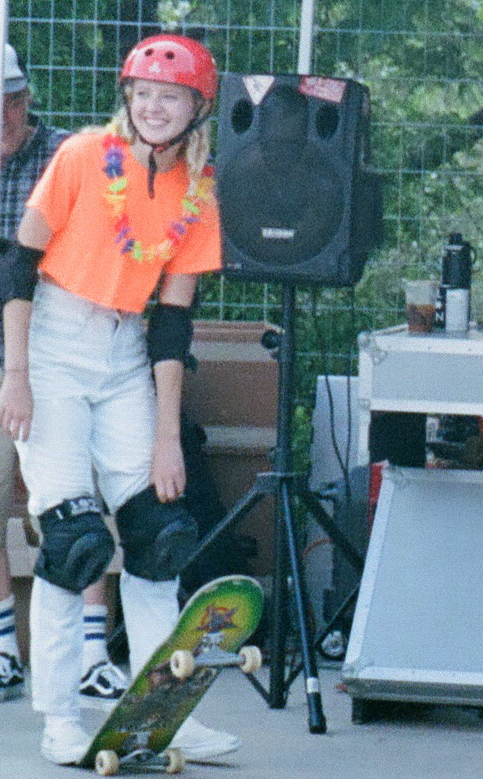
- Martin at Pier 62 Skatepark in 2021

Personal information
- Nationality: British-American
- Born: 1 June 2006 (age 19) Manhattan, New York, US
- Occupation: Skateboarder

Sport
- Country: Great Britain
- Sport: Skateboarding
- Position: Goofy-footed
- Rank: 27th (Park)
- Event(s): Park, vert
- Pro tour(s): Dew Tour

Achievements and titles
- National finals: 2021 GB Skateboard Championship: Women's park – Gold

Bombette Martin (born 1 June 2006) is a British-American skateboarder. She won the women's park event at the 2021 GB Skateboard Championships. Martin and Sky Brown were selected to represent Great Britain in skateboarding at the 2020 Summer Olympics. She became the first skateboarder to ever compete in a park event in the Olympic Games.

Martin was born and lives in New York City, though she spent much of her childhood in her father’s home city of Birmingham, England, and holds dual citizenship in the United Kingdom and the United States. About joining Team GB rather than Team USA for the 2020 Olympics, Martin said, "I like to make the joke that I'm half a New Yorker, and 3/4ths a Brummie! I spent so much of my childhood in Birmingham because my dad is British, so I guess it didn't really cross my mind, or my family's mind, to even try and compete for America. We just decided to try and go for Great Britain and it's worked out."

She was named after her father, Jon "Bomber" Martin, an amateur boxer.

Bombette credits Andrew Gelles as her first skateboard coach, meeting him at her local skatepark.

In 2021, Bombette and her brother and fellow skateboarder, Kayo Martin, were featured in a promotional campaign for Gap Inc.

In 2023, Bombette released a capsule collection of sneakers with Italian brand P448. As of November 2023, Bombette is a brand ambassador for P448.

Bombette is the older sister of actor and skateboarder Kayo Martin.
