= East of Wall =

2025 American film by Kate Beecroft

- Theatrical release poster
- Directed by: Kate Beecroft
- Written by: Kate Beecroft
- Produced by: Lila Yacoub; Kate Beecroft; Melanie Ramsayer; Shannon Moss
- Starring: Tabatha Zimiga; Porshia Zimiga; Scoot McNairy; Jennifer Ehle
- Cinematography: Austin Shelton
- Edited by: Jennifer Vecchiarello
- Music by: Lukas Frank; Daniel Meyer-O'Keefe
- Production companies: Station Road; Stetson's Kingdom
- Distributed by: Sony Pictures Classics
- Release dates: January 24, 2025 (Sundance); August 15, 2025 (United States)
- Running time: 97 minutes
- Country: United States
- Language: English
- Box office: $720,612

East of Wall is a 2025 American contemporary Western drama film, written and directed by Kate Beecroft, in her feature directing debut. It stars Tabatha Zimiga, Porshia Zimiga, Scoot McNairy and Jennifer Ehle.

It had its world premiere at the NEXT section of the 2025 Sundance Film Festival on January 24, where it won the Audience Award. It was theatrically released by Sony Pictures Classics on August 15.

== Premise ==
A horse trainer wrestles with financial issues and unresolved grief, while hosting a group of wayward teenagers on her ranch.

== Cast ==
- Tabatha Zimiga as Tabatha
- Porshia Zimiga as Porshia
- Scoot McNairy as Roy Waters
- Jennifer Ehle as Tracey
- Jesse Thorson as Jesse
- Chancey Ryder Witt as Ryder
- Clay Pateneaud as Clay
- Leanna Shumpert as Leanna
- Brynn Darling as Brynn
- Ryan Caraway as Wes

== Production ==
Kate Beecroft spent three years in South Dakota, embedding herself with the community and the Zimiga family. The film is inspired by Tabatha Zimiga's life.

== Release ==
It had its world premiere at the 2025 Sundance Film Festival on January 24, 2025, where it won the Audience Award in the NEXT program. In February 2025, Sony Pictures Classics acquired distribution rights to the film. It also screened at Tribeca Festival on June 11, 2025. It was released on August 15, 2025.

== Critical reception ==
On the review aggregator website Rotten Tomatoes, 95% of 76 critics' reviews are positive, with an average rating of 7.4/10. The website's consensus reads: "Earnestly dedicated to the women depicted on screen, East of Wall displays the grit and grind of living life as it comes in the Badlands while never muddying its subjects." Metacritic, which uses a weighted average, assigned the film a score of 73 out of 100, based on 14 critics, indicating "generally favorable" reviews.

The film received two nominations at the 41st Independent Spirit Awards: Best Breakthrough Performance for Tabatha Zimiga and Best First Feature.
