= Independent Spirit Award for Best Breakthrough Performance =

Annual US film award

- Presented by: Independent Spirit Awards
- First award: Sean Nelson; Fresh (1995)
- Currently held by: Kayo Martin; The Plague (2025)
- Website: filmindependent.org

The Independent Spirit Award for Best Breakthrough Performance is an award presented annually at the Independent Spirit Awards to honor outstanding performances given by a new talent in an independent film. It was first presented in 1995 at the 10th Independent Spirit Awards as Best Debut Performance, which was won by Sean Nelson for his performance in the film Fresh.

The category was then discontinued in 2005, but it was later re-introduced as Best Breakthrough Performance at the 2023 ceremony. The Best Breakthrough Performance in a New Scripted Series category was added ahead of the 2024 ceremony.

== Winners and nominees ==
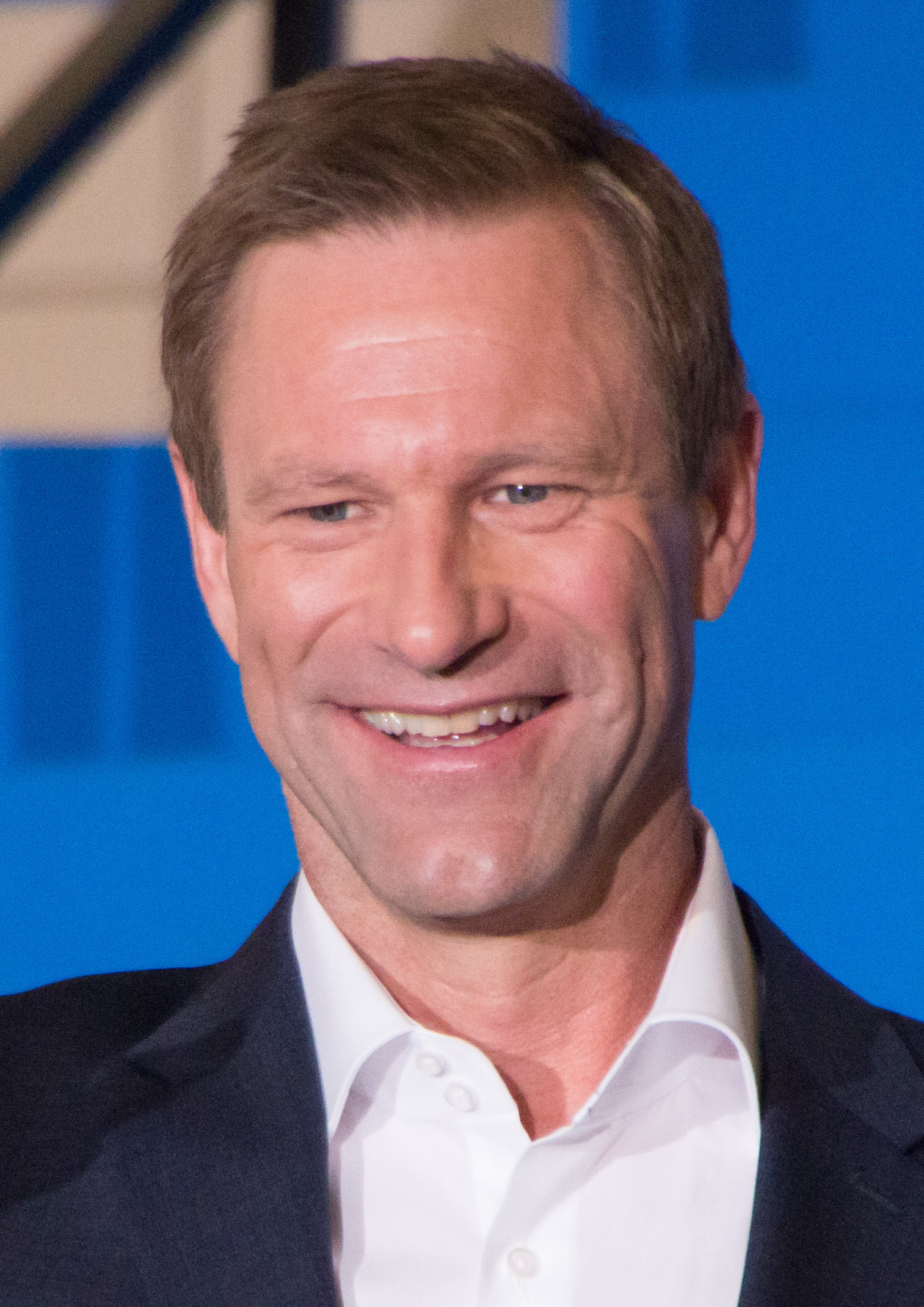
Aaron Eckhart won for In the Company of Men.

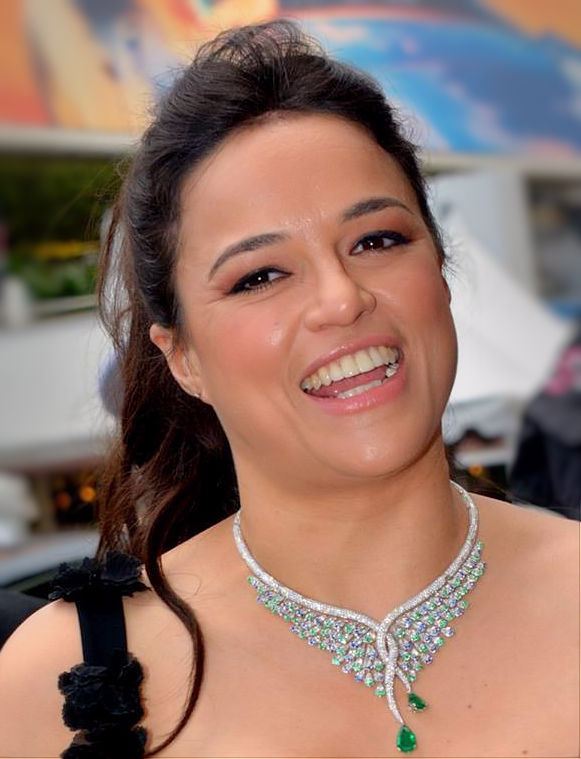
Michelle Rodriguez won for Girlfight.

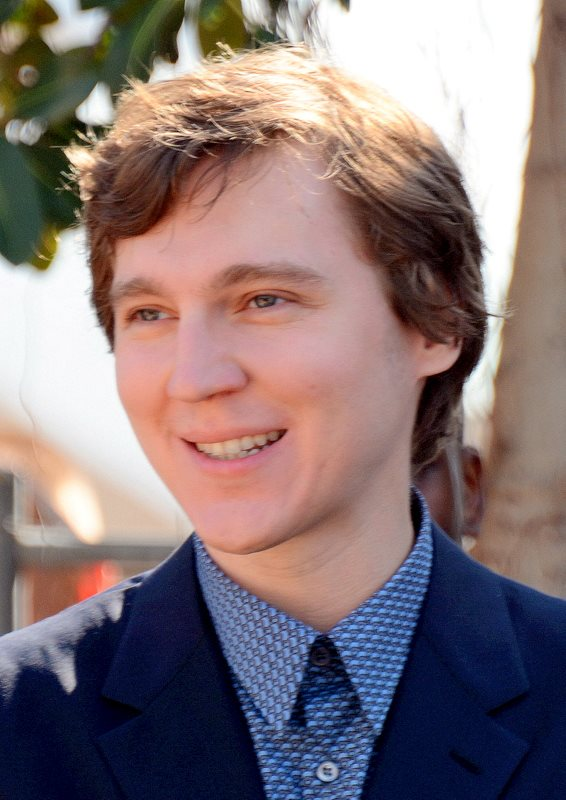
Paul Dano won for L.I.E..

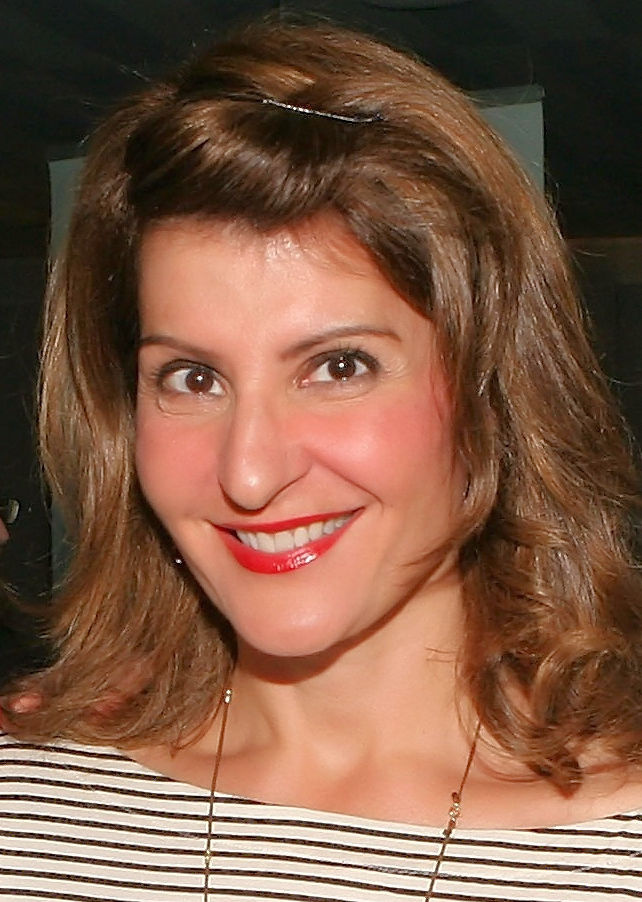
Nia Vardalos won for My Big Fat Greek Wedding.

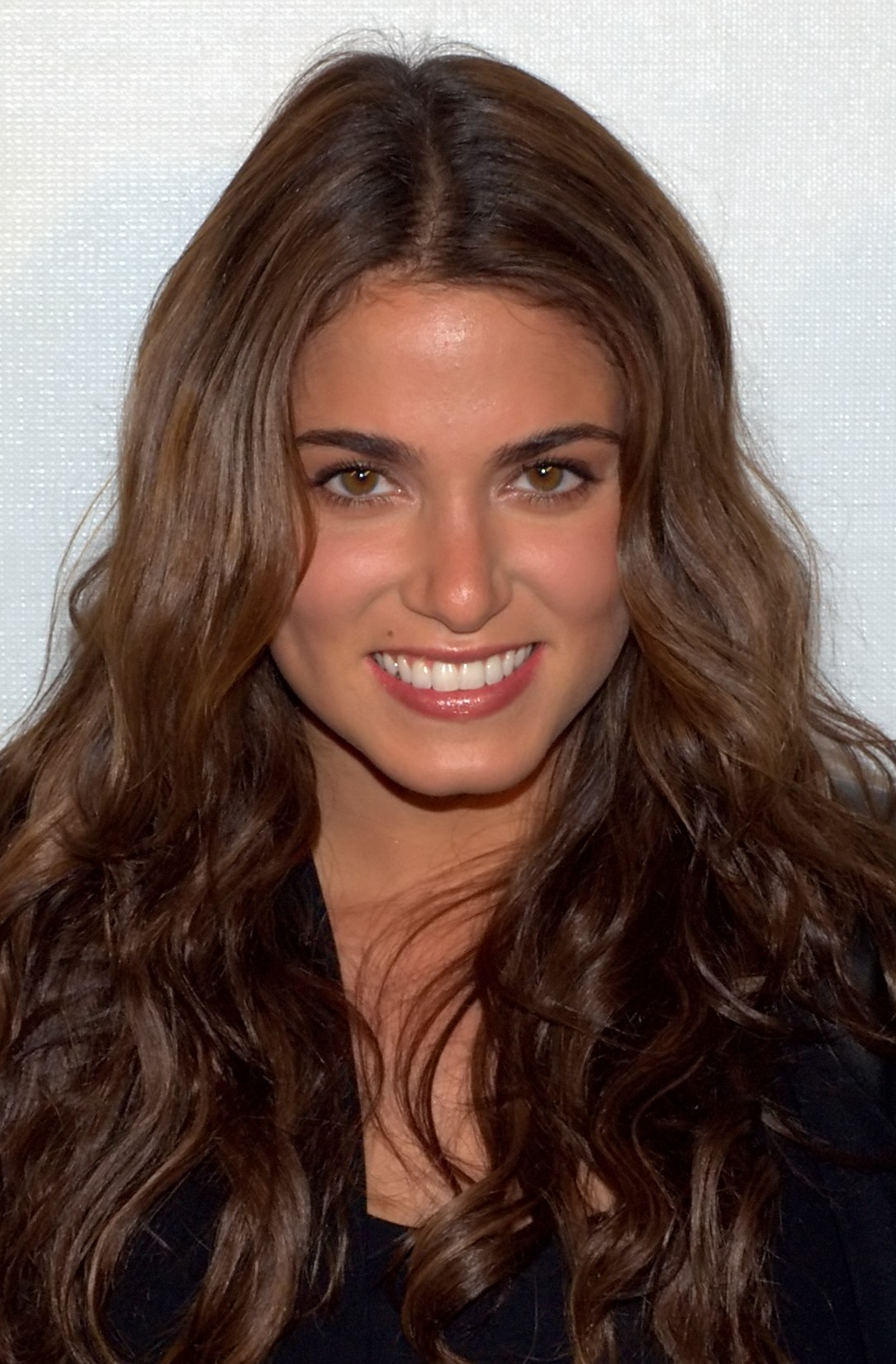
Nikki Reed won for Thirteen.

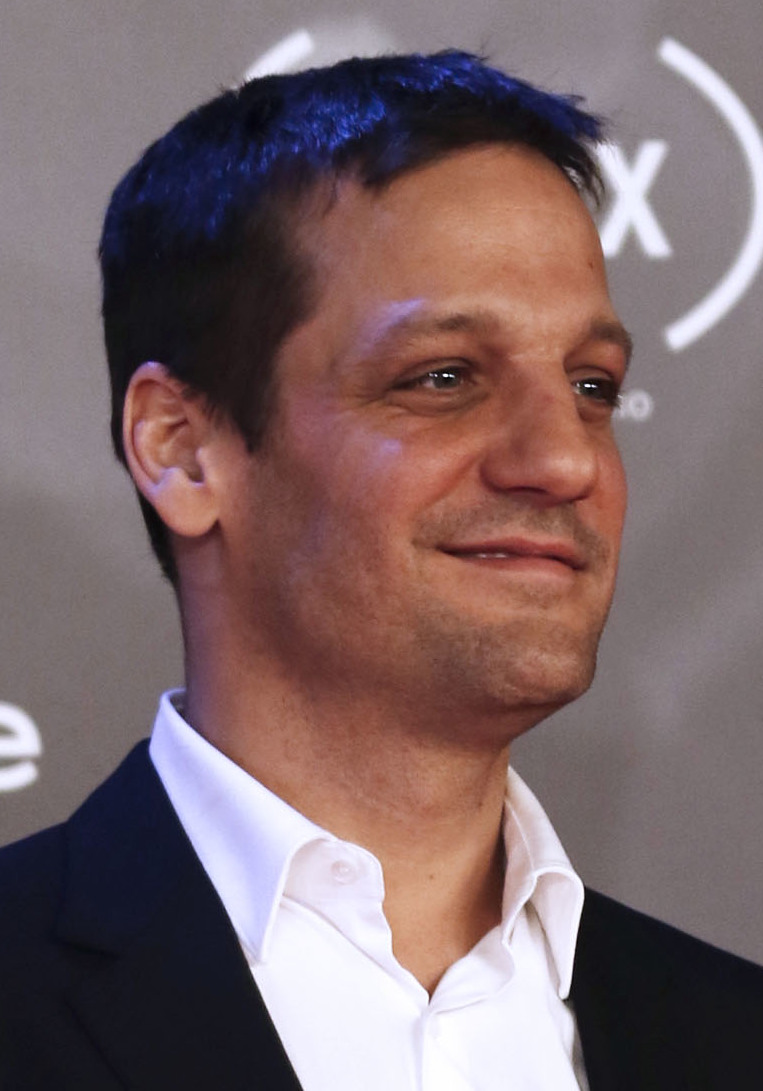
Rodrigo de la Serna won for The Motorcycle Diaries.

=== 1990s ===
Year	Winner and nominees	Film	Role
1995	Sean Nelson	Fresh	Fresh
1995	Jeff Anderson	Clerks	Randal Graves
1995	Jeremy Davies	Spanking the Monkey	Ray Aibelli
1995	Alicia Witt	Fun	Bonnie
1995	Renée Zellweger	Love and a .45	Starlene Cheatham
1996	Justin Pierce	Kids	Casper
1996	Jason Andrews	Rhythm Thief	Simon
1996	Lisa Donaldson	River of Grass	Cozy
1996	Gabriel Casseus	New Jersey Drive	Kyle "Midget"
1996	Rose McGowan	The Doom Generation	Amy Blue
1997	Heather Matarazzo	Welcome to the Dollhouse	Dawn Wiener
1997	Jena Malone	Bastard Out of Carolina	Ruth Anne "Bone" Boatwright
1997	Brendan Sexton III	Welcome to the Dollhouse	Brandon McCarthy
1997	Arie Verveen	Caught	Nick
1997	Jeffrey Wright	Basquiat	Jean-Michel Basquiat
1998	Aaron Eckhart	In the Company of Men	Chad
1998	Tyrone D. Burton, Eddie Cutanda and Phuong Duong	Squeeze	Tyson, Hector and Bao
1998	Lysa Flores	Star Maps	Maria
1998	Darling Narita	Bang	The Girl
1998	Douglas Spain	Star Maps	Carlos
1999	Evan Adams	Smoke Signals	Thomas Builds-the-Fire
1999	Anthony Roth Costanzo	A Soldier's Daughter Never Cries	Francis Fortescue
1999	Andrea Hart	Miss Monday	Gloria
1999	Sonja Sohn	Slam	Lauren Bell
1999	Saul Williams	Slam	Ray Joshua

=== 2000s ===
Year	Winner and nominees	Film	Role
2000	Kimberly J. Brown	Tumbleweeds	Mary Jo Walker
2000	Jessica Campbell	Election	Tammy Metzler
2000	Jade Gordon	Sugar Town	Gwen
2000	Toby Smith	Drylongso	Pica Sullivan
2000	Chris Stafford	Edge of Seventeen	Eric Hunter
2001	Michelle Rodriguez	Girlfight	Diana Guzman
2001	Curtis Cotton III, Candace Evanofski, Rachael Handy, Donald Holden and Damian Jewan Lee	George Washington	Buddy, Nasia, Sonya, George Richardson and Vernon
2001	Rory Culkin	You Can Count on Me	Rudy
2001	Emmy Rossum	Songcatcher	Deladis Slocumb
2001	Mike White	Chuck & Buck	Buck O'Brien
2002	Paul Dano	L.I.E.	Howie Blitzer
2002	Hilary Howard, Anthony Leslie and Mitchell Riggs	Kaaterskill Falls	Ren, Lyle and Mitchell
2002	Clint Jordan	Virgil Bliss	Virgil Bliss
2002	Ana Reeder	Acts of Worship	Alix
2002	Yolonda Ross	Stranger Inside	Treasure
2003	Nia Vardalos	My Big Fat Greek Wedding	Fotoula "Toula" Portokalos
2003	Bob Burrus	Tully	Tully Russell Coates Sr.
2003	America Ferrera	Real Women Have Curves	Ana García
2003	Raven Goodwin	Lovely & Amazing	Annie Marks
2003	Artel Kayàru	Dahmer	Rodney
2004	Nikki Reed	Thirteen	Evie Zamora
2004	Anna Kendrick	Camp	Fritzi Wagner
2004	Judy Marte	Raising Victor Vargas	Judy
2004	Victor Rasuk	Raising Victor Vargas	Victor
2004	Janice Richardson	Anne B. Real	Cynthia Gimenez
2005	Rodrigo de la Serna	The Motorcycle Diaries	Alberto Granado
2005	Anthony Mackie	Brother to Brother	Perry
2005	Louie Olivos Jr.	Robbing Peter	Pedro
2005	Hannah Pilkes	The Woodsman	Robin
2005	David Sullivan	Primer	Abe

=== 2020s ===
Year	Winner and nominees	Film	Role
2022	Stephanie Hsu	Everything Everywhere All at Once	Joy Wang / Jobu Tupaki
2022	Frankie Corio	Aftersun	Sophie
2022	Gracija Filipović	Murina	Julija
2022	Lily McInerny	Palm Trees and Power Lines	Lea
2022	Daniel Zolghadri	Funny Pages	Robert
2023	Dominic Sessa	The Holdovers	Angus Tully
2023	Marshawn Lynch	Bottoms	Mr. G
2023	Atibon Nazaire	Mountains	Xavier
2023	Tia Nomore	Earth Mama	Gia
2023	Anaita Wali Zada	Fremont	Donya
2024	Maisy Stella	My Old Ass	Elliott
2024	Isaac Krasner	Big Boys	Jamie
2024	Katy O'Brian	Love Lies Bleeding	Jacqueline "Jackie" Cleaver
2024	Mason Alexander Park	National Anthem	Carrie
2024	René Pérez Joglar	In the Summers	Vicente
2025	Kayo Martin	The Plague	Jake
2025	Liz Larsen	The Baltimorons	Didi
2025	Misha Osherovich	She’s the He	Ethan
2025	SZA	One of Them Days	Alyssa
2025	Tabatha Zimiga	East of Wall	Tabatha

== Best Breakthrough Performance in a New Scripted Series ==
=== 2020s ===
Year	Winner and nominees	Series	Role
2023	Keivonn Montreal Woodard	The Last of Us	Sam
2023	Clark Backo	The Changeling	Emma "Emmy" Valentine
2023	Aria Mia Loberti	All the Light We Cannot See	Marie-Laure LeBlanc
2023	Adjani Salmon	Dreaming Whilst Black	Kwabena
2023	Kara Young	I'm a Virgo	Jones
2024	Jessica Gunning	Baby Reindeer	Martha Scott
2024	Diarra Kilpatrick	Diarra from Detroit	Diarra Brickland
2024	Joe Locke	Agatha All Along	Billy Maximoff and Tommy Maximoff
2024	Megan Stott	Penelope	Penelope
2024	Hoa Xuande	The Sympathizer	The Captain
2025	Owen Cooper	Adolescence	Jamie Miller
2025	Asif Ali	Deli Boys	Mir Dar
2025	Wally Baram	Overcompensating	Carmen Neil
2025	Michael Cooper Jr.	Forever	Justin Edwards
2025	Ernest Kingsley Junior	Washington Black	George Washington 'Wash' Black
