= Lizzie Shapiro =

American film producer

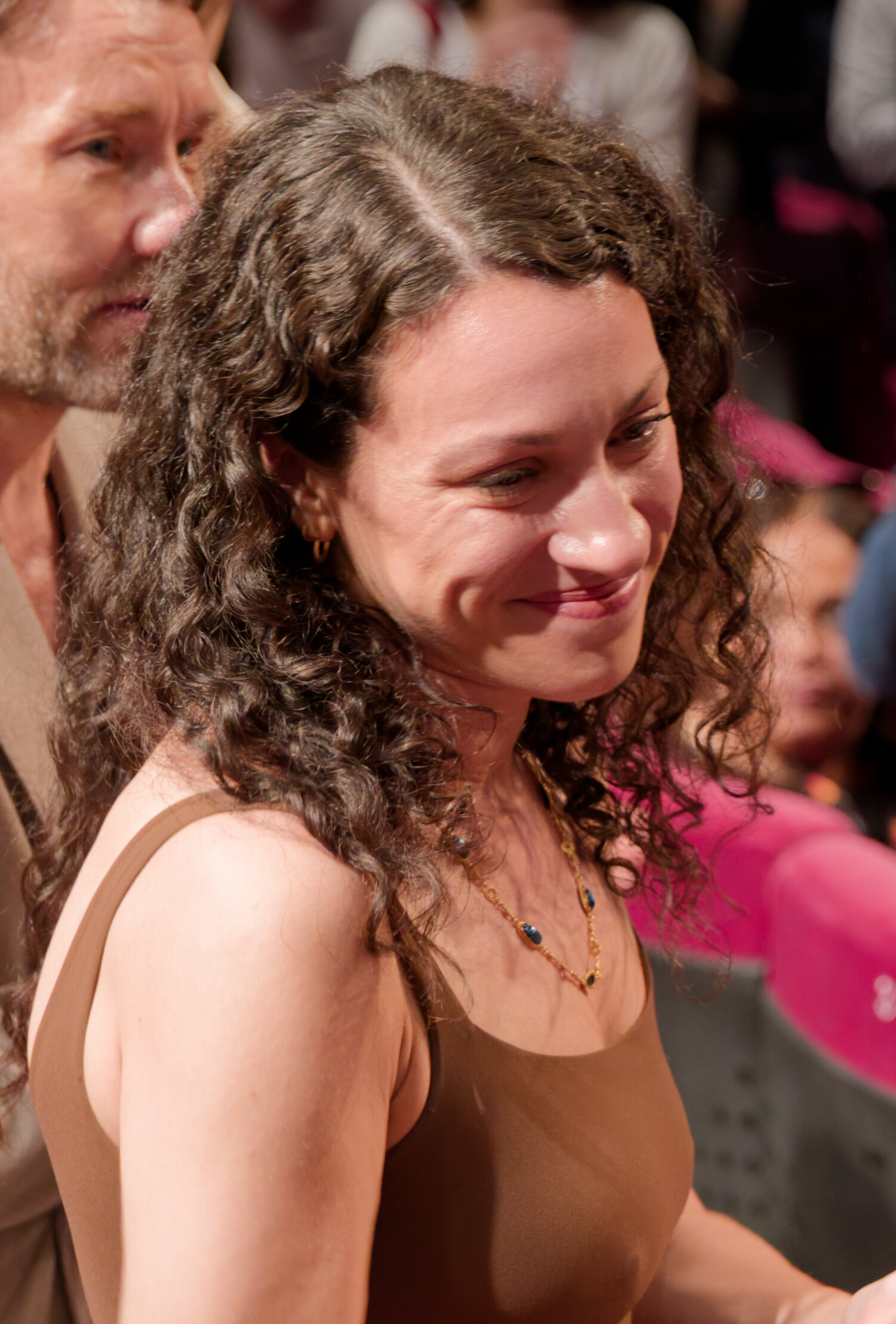
- Shapiro at the Cannes Film Festival in 2025
- Education: New York University Tisch School of the Arts (BFA)
- Occupation: Film producer
- Employer: The Space Program

Lizzie Shapiro is an American film producer. Based in Brooklyn, New York, she co-runs a producing collective called the Space Program and has produced films like Shiva Baby, Mickey and the Bear, The Plague, Sasquatch Sunset, and Chestnut.

== Early life and education ==
Shapiro attended the New York University Tisch School of the Arts where she studied Film Production.

== Career ==
Shapiro has produced several short films such as Frankie Keeps Talking, Jahar, Where There's Smoke, and others. She also served as the post supervisor and New York production supervisor for Goat, which premiered at the 2016 Sundance Film Festival. Since then, she has produced films like Shiva Baby, The Plague, Sasquatch Sunset, and Chestnut.

Additionally, Shapiro has production credits for content with Vice Media's I-D, Barbarian Group, Yacht Club Films, and others, while also having worked on music videos for Pusha T, Maggie Rogers, Lil Yachty, and Young Thug, among other musicians.

Shapiro, alongside Lexi Tannenholtz and Gus Deardoff, runs the Space Program, a producing collective where "the three-person team collaborates on all projects—with one person taking lead and the others assuming supporting roles, depending on the film."

In 2022, Shapiro won a $25,000 Spirit Awards grant from Film Independent. Specifically, as an emerging producer, she won the Producers Award. In 2023, she won the inaugural Jane Pierson Champion Award at South by Southwest.
