= Kayo Martin =

British-American actor, boxer, skateboarder, and social media personality

- Martin in 2025
- Born: March 15, 2010 (age 16); New York, United States
- Occupations: Actor, boxer, skateboarder, social media personality
- Years active: 2024–present
- Known for: The Plague
- Relatives: Bombette Martin (sister)
- Awards: Film Independent Spirit Award for Best Breakthrough Performance

Kayo Martin is a British-American actor, boxer, skateboarder, and social media personality. He made his feature film debut as Jake in Charlie Polinger's psychological drama The Plague. For his performance, Martin won the Independent Spirit Award for Best Breakthrough Performance at the 41st Independent Spirit Awards.

== Early life ==
Martin is from New York and is of British lineage. His sister is Bombette Martin, a skateboarder who represented the United Kingdom at the 2020 Summer Olympics.

Martin competes at a competitive level in both boxing and skateboarding with his status as a National Junior Golden Gloves finalist in boxing and competed in a 2024 Olympics qualifier event for men's park skateboarding.

== Career ==
Martin gained an online following through videos connected to skateboarding, boxing, and public stunts.

His work outside acting has included appearances in fashion and advertising campaigns. Martin appeared in the campaign for the KidSuper x BAPE collaboration alongside Kai Cenat and NLE Choppa.

Martin made his feature film debut as the lead antagonist Jake in The Plague, a psychological drama written and directed by Charlie Polinger. which premiered in the Un Certain Regard section at the 2025 Cannes Film Festival, where it was listed as Polinger's first feature film. For his performance, Martin won the Independent Spirit Award for Best Breakthrough Performance at the 41st Independent Spirit Awards.

Martin's casting for the role occurred after Polinger and his wife discovered him on Instagram and felt that he was well suited for the film.

In 2026, Martin was cast as one of the leads in the Netflix comedy series I Suck at Girls, based on the book by Justin Halpern of the same name.

== Filmography ==
Year	Title	Role	Notes
2025	The Plague	Jake	Feature film debut
TBA	I Suck at Girls	TBA	Netflix comedy series

== Awards and nominations ==
Year	Award	Category	Work	Result
2025	Sitges Film Festival	Best Actor	The Plague	Won
2025	New York Film Critics Online	Breakthrough Performer	The Plague	Nominated
2026	Independent Spirit Awards	Best Breakthrough Performance	The Plague	Won
