= Train Dreams (film) =

2025 American drama film

- Official release poster
- Directed by: Clint Bentley
- Screenplay by: Clint Bentley; Greg Kwedar
- Based on: Train Dreams by Denis Johnson
- Produced by: Marissa McMahon; Teddy Schwarzman; Will Janowitz; Ashley Schlaifer; Michael Heimler
- Starring: Joel Edgerton; Felicity Jones; Nathaniel Arcand; Clifton Collins Jr.; John Diehl; Paul Schneider; Kerry Condon; William H. Macy
- Narrated by: Will Patton
- Cinematography: Adolpho Veloso
- Edited by: Parker Laramie
- Music by: Bryce Dessner
- Production companies: Black Bear; Kamala Films
- Distributed by: Netflix
- Release dates: January 26, 2025 (Sundance); November 7, 2025 (United States)
- Running time: 102 minutes
- Country: United States
- Language: English
- Budget: $10 million

Train Dreams is a 2025 American period drama film directed by Clint Bentley, who co-wrote the screenplay with Greg Kwedar, based on the 2011 novella by Denis Johnson. The film stars Joel Edgerton, Felicity Jones, Nathaniel Arcand, Clifton Collins Jr., John Diehl, Paul Schneider, Kerry Condon, and William H. Macy, with narration from Will Patton.

Train Dreams had its world premiere at the 2025 Sundance Film Festival on January 26, 2025, and was released in select theaters in the United States on November 7, 2025, before its streaming debut by Netflix on November 21, 2025. The film received critical acclaim, with praise going to Bentley's direction and Edgerton's performance. Among its accolades, the film was named as one of the top ten films of 2025 by both the National Board of Review and the American Film Institute. For his performance, Edgerton was nominated for a Golden Globe Award. It received four nominations at the 98th Academy Awards, including Best Picture and Best Adapted Screenplay.

== Plot ==
The film recounts the 80 years of the life of Robert Grainier around Bonners Ferry, Idaho. Arriving in the area on the Great Northern Railway as a 7 year old orphaned child in 1893, Robert drops out of school and spends his younger years without direction or purpose, until he meets Gladys Olding. They marry, build a log cabin along the Moyie River, and have a daughter, Kate.

Robert takes to railroad construction for the Spokane International Railway. There he witnesses a Chinese worker thrown from a bridge by a group of white workers for unclear reasons, which gives him continually haunting visions of the man and dreams of him being struck by a train. Robert later takes up seasonal logging work, but it takes him away from Gladys and Kate for long periods of time.

Robert meets many men who leave impressions on him, but he also witnesses more tragedies along the way. One worker is killed by a vigilante avenging the murder of his brother; several other workers are killed by a falling tree, their graves marked by pairs of boots nailed to trees. Robert grows close to a fellow logger, Arn Peeples, who is severely injured by a falling branch, and then dies a few days later.

Although Robert tries to take up work closer to home, he faces struggles in the post-World War I economy. He and Gladys decide to farm and build a lumber mill so he can stop logging. However, when Robert returns from his final season of logging he discovers the cabin destroyed in a wildfire, with Gladys and Kate missing. Despondent, he mopes at the site of the cabin, and his friend Ignatius Jack gives him company; Robert rebuilds the cabin. As Robert returns to logging, he becomes out of place amid new technology and younger, rougher men, so he decides to stop.

Taking a job as a carriage driver for townspeople, Robert meets Claire Thompson of the United States Forest Service who is in town to conduct a survey, and encourages him. He continually walks through the woods, believing he can feel the spirits of his wife and daughter sometimes, and hopes not to drive them away; Claire in turn tells him how her husband died after a long illness.

One night, Robert believes he sees an injured young woman, whom he believes may be Kate, outside his cabin and he tends to her wounds, then remembers playing with baby Kate by the river. However, after a night of dreams he awakens to find her gone and a window open. He determines to continue living in the cabin in case she ever returns. Years go by, and the world changes around an aging and weathered Robert, who rides the Great Northern into Spokane, witnessing John Glenn's flight into space on a television.

The film ends on a spring day when Robert purchases a sightseeing passenger flight in a biplane. As the plane loops and circles in the air, sights and sounds of people and places throughout his life pass through his mind. The narrator recounts that Robert died in his sleep in the cabin in November 1968, leaving no heirs, but that on that spring day in the plane, "as he misplaced all sense of up and down, he felt, at last, connected to it all."

== Cast ==
- Joel Edgerton as Robert Grainier
- Felicity Jones as Gladys Olding Grainier, Robert's wife
- Kerry Condon as Claire Thompson, a forestry services worker
- William H. Macy as Arn Peeples, an explosives expert
- Will Patton as the narrator (Note: Will Patton previously recorded the narration for the audiobook of the novella.)
- Nathaniel Arcand as Ignatius Jack, a storekeeper and Robert's friend
- John Diehl as Billy, an old logger
- Paul Schneider as Apostle Frank, a talkative logger
- Clifton Collins Jr. as Boomer, an injured man whom Robert encountered as a boy
- Alfred Hsing as Fu Sheng, a Chinese logger
- Chuck Tucker as Silent Man
- Rob Price as Curious Logger
- Beau Charles as Young Logger
- Johnny Arnoux as Kootenai Indian
- John Patrick Lowrie as Mr. Sears
- Branden Lindsay as Elijah Brown

== Influences ==
Train Dreams has been compared to the work of Terrence Malick, and Bentley has cited Malick as an influence, describing him as "one of the greatest filmmakers to have ever lived."

He changed the language of cinema. He created a new form, like one of those rare filmmakers that turned the medium in a new direction. There's not many of them.

So, yeah, I'm a big fan. Trying to do my own thing, but if I'm mentioned in the same sentence as him, I'm very honored.

Bentley has cited Andrei Rublev, Princess Mononoke, It's Such a Beautiful Day, and Days of Heaven as films that influenced his adaptation of Denis Johnson's novella. Bentley also cited Jules et Jim and Y Tu Mamá También as key influences on the film's use of third-person narration.

== Production ==
The film was produced by Marissa McMahon and Ashley Schlaifer with Black Bear as an adaptation of Denis Johnson's 2011 novella Train Dreams by Clint Bentley and Greg Kwedar, and directed by Clint Bentley and starring Felicity Jones and Joel Edgerton. Producers include Marissa McMahon and Ashley Schlaifer for Kamala Films, and Will Janowitz, and Teddy Schwarzman and Michael Heimler for Black Bear. In May 2024, Kerry Condon, William H. Macy, and Clifton Collins Jr. joined the cast.

Principal photography started in Washington in April 2024, with filming locations including Tekoa, Snoqualmie, Spokane, Metaline Falls, and Colville. The production was approved for support from the Production Incentive Program of Washington Filmworks. Although Bentley and cinematographer Adolpho Veloso considered shooting on film, the production's 29-day schedule made it impractical; as a result, it was shot digitally.

Bentley has said that only a limited number of real trees were felled during production; scenes depicting characters cutting into a tree were performed using an artificial prop constructed from wood and fiberglass, with visual effects applied to extend the trunk and canopy to resemble a full-sized tree. Will Patton provided the voiceover for the film. He had also previously narrated the audiobook of Denis Johnson's novella.

In an interview with Variety, Veloso mentions that the movie was shot entirely in natural light using an Arri Alexa 35 cinema camera. Additionally, Veloso built a customized candle rig in order to get around the set's no open flames rule.

=== Music ===
An original song recorded for the film and performed by Nick Cave, "Train Dreams", was not included in the version shown at the Sundance Film Festival; it was added in subsequent releases, playing over the end credits.

== Release and reception ==
Train Dreams premiered at the 2025 Sundance Film Festival on January 26, 2025. Shortly after, Netflix acquired distribution rights to the film. The film was released in select theaters in the United States on November 7, 2025, before being made available for streaming on Netflix globally on November 21.

It competed in Stockholm Competition of the 2025 Stockholm International Film Festival on November 8, 2025.

=== Critical response ===
On the review aggregator website Rotten Tomatoes, 93% of 245 critics' reviews are positive, with an average rating of 8.5/10. The website's consensus reads: "A gorgeous meditation on America, ably shouldered by one of Joel Edgerton's very best performances, Train Dreams takes on mythic proportions while maintaining an intimate emotional delicacy." Metacritic, which uses a weighted average, assigned the film a score of 88 out of 100, based on 43 critics, indicating "universal acclaim".

Roxana Hadadi, writing for the Vulture, described how, "[Bentley and Kwedar] pull out and emphasize the novella’s driving idea — that all of us will eventually be forgotten — and use it to ask how we should live our lives before that inevitable insignificance." Writing for RogerEbert.com, Brian Tallerico gave the film 4 stars out of 4, describing the film as "a meditation on the beauty of everyone and everything", and commenting that "the reason it's one of the best [films] of the year is how [Bentley] threads the needle between brutal reality and wistful poetry."

Alissa Wilkinson for The New York Times praised the film's "astonishingly beautiful" cinematography, as well as the performance of Edgerton. "He’s at his most superb when his manner is gentle, and he’s capable of doing so much with so little," she writes. "Here he moves from passivity to passion to grief to wonder — it’s a beautiful role for him, and he broke my heart."

In a review for The New Yorker, Justin Chang wrote that, "Bentley and Kwedar have, fundamentally, a carpenter’s approach to cinema. They offer the promise and pleasure of handcrafted art, but with every rough edge sanded down, every surface given a soulful coat of varnish."

== Awards and nominations ==
Award	Date of ceremony	Category	Nominee(s)	Result	Ref.
AARP Movies for Grownups Awards	January 10, 2026	Best Picture	Train Dreams	Nominated	
AARP Movies for Grownups Awards	January 10, 2026	Best Actor	Joel Edgerton	Nominated	
Academy Awards	March 15, 2026	Best Picture	Marissa McMahon, Teddy Schwarzman, Will Janowitz, Ashley Schlaifer, and Michael Heimler	Nominated	
Academy Awards	March 15, 2026	Best Adapted Screenplay	Clint Bentley and Greg Kwedar	Nominated	
Academy Awards	March 15, 2026	Best Cinematography	Adolpho Veloso	Nominated	
Academy Awards	March 15, 2026	Best Original Song	"Train Dreams" – Nick Cave and Bryce Dessner	Nominated	
American Film Institute Awards	December 4, 2025	Top 10 Films	Train Dreams	Won (Note: Award shared with nine other films.)	
Artios Awards	February 26, 2026	Feature Studio or Independent – Drama	Avy Kaufman	Nominated	
Astra Film Awards	January 9, 2026	Best Picture – Drama	Train Dreams	Nominated	
Astra Film Awards	January 9, 2026	Best Actor – Drama	Joel Edgerton	Nominated	
Astra Film Awards	January 9, 2026	Best Adapted Screenplay	Clint Bentley and Greg Kwedar	Nominated	
Astra Film Awards	January 9, 2026	Best Voice Over Performance	Will Patton	Nominated	
Astra Film Awards	January 9, 2026	Best Original Song	"Train Dreams" – Nick Cave and Bryce Dessner	Nominated	
Astra Film Awards	December 11, 2025	Best Cinematography	Adolpho Veloso	Nominated	
Austin Film Critics Association	December 18, 2025	Best Picture	Train Dreams	Nominated	
Austin Film Critics Association	December 18, 2025	Best Adapted Screenplay	Clint Bentley and Greg Kwedar	Nominated	
Austin Film Critics Association	December 18, 2025	Best Cinematography	Adolpho Veloso	Nominated	
Austin Film Critics Association	December 18, 2025	Best Voice Acting/Animated/Digital Performance	Will Patton	Nominated	
British Academy Film Awards	February 22, 2026	Best Cinematography	Adolpho Veloso	Nominated	
Camerimage	November 22, 2025	Actor's Award	Joel Edgerton	Won	
Chicago Film Critics Association	December 11, 2025	Best Film	Train Dreams	Nominated	
Chicago Film Critics Association	December 11, 2025	Best Actor	Joel Edgerton	Nominated	
Chicago Film Critics Association	December 11, 2025	Best Adapted Screenplay	Clint Bentley and Greg Kwedar	Nominated	
Chicago Film Critics Association	December 11, 2025	Best Cinematography	Adolpho Veloso	Nominated	
Chicago Film Critics Association	December 11, 2025	Best Original Score	Bryce Dessner	Nominated	
Chicago International Film Festival	October 19, 2025	Artistic Achievement Award	Joel Edgerton and Clint Bentley	Won	
Critics Choice Awards	January 4, 2026	Best Picture	Train Dreams	Nominated	
Critics Choice Awards	January 4, 2026	Best Actor	Joel Edgerton	Nominated	
Critics Choice Awards	January 4, 2026	Best Adapted Screenplay	Clint Bentley and Greg Kwedar	Nominated	
Critics Choice Awards	January 4, 2026	Best Cinematography	Adolpho Veloso	Won	
Critics Choice Awards	January 4, 2026	Best Song	"Train Dreams" – Nick Cave and Bryce Dessner	Nominated	
Deauville American Film Festival	September 11, 2025	Talent Award	Joel Edgerton	Won	
Film Independent Spirit Awards	February 15, 2026	Best Feature	Michael Heimler, Will Janowitz, Marissa McMahon, Ashley Schlaifer, and Teddy Schwarzman	Won	
Film Independent Spirit Awards	February 15, 2026	Best Director	Clint Bentley	Won	
Film Independent Spirit Awards	February 15, 2026	Best Lead Performance	Joel Edgerton	Nominated	
Film Independent Spirit Awards	February 15, 2026	Best Cinematography	Adolpho Veloso	Won	
Georgia Film Critics Association	December 27, 2025	Best Picture	Train Dreams	Nominated	
Georgia Film Critics Association	December 27, 2025	Best Director	Clint Bentley	Nominated	
Georgia Film Critics Association	December 27, 2025	Best Actor	Joel Edgerton	Nominated	
Georgia Film Critics Association	December 27, 2025	Best Adapted Screenplay	Clint Bentley and Greg Kwedar	Runner-up	
Georgia Film Critics Association	December 27, 2025	Best Cinematography	Adolpho Veloso	Runner-up	
Georgia Film Critics Association	December 27, 2025	Best Original Score	Bryce Dessner	Runner-up	
Georgia Film Critics Association	December 27, 2025	Best Original Song	"Train Dreams" – Nick Cave and Bryce Dessner	Nominated	
Golden Globe Awards	January 11, 2026	Best Actor in a Motion Picture – Drama	Joel Edgerton	Nominated	
Golden Globe Awards	January 11, 2026	Best Original Song	"Train Dreams" – Nick Cave and Bryce Dessner	Nominated	
Gotham Awards	December 1, 2025	Best Feature	Michael Heimler, Will Janowitz, Marissa McMahon, Ashley Schlaifer, and Teddy Schwarzman	Nominated	
Gotham Awards	December 1, 2025	Best Adapted Screenplay	Clint Bentley and Greg Kwedar	Nominated	
Middleburg Film Festival	October 19, 2025	Outstanding Achievement in Acting Award	Joel Edgerton	Won	
Mill Valley Film Festival	October 7, 2025	Spotlight Award	Joel Edgerton	Won	
National Board of Review	January 13, 2026	Top 10 Films	Train Dreams	Won	
National Board of Review	January 13, 2026	Best Adapted Screenplay	Clint Bentley and Greg Kwedar	Won	
Phoenix Film Critics Society	December 15, 2025	Top Ten Films	Train Dreams	Won	
Producers Guild of America Awards	February 28, 2026	Best Theatrical Motion Picture	Marissa McMahon, Teddy Schwarzman, Will Janowitz, Ashley Schlaifer, and Michael Heimler	Nominated	
San Diego Film Critics Society	December 15, 2025	Best Actor	Joel Edgerton	Runner-up	
San Diego Film Critics Society	December 15, 2025	Best Adapted Screenplay	Clint Bentley and Greg Kwedar	Nominated	
San Diego Film Critics Society	December 15, 2025	Best Cinematography	Adolpho Veloso	Won	
Savannah Film Festival	November 1, 2025	Vanguard Award	Joel Edgerton	Won	
Seattle Film Critics Society	December 15, 2025	Best Picture	Train Dreams	Nominated	
Seattle Film Critics Society	December 15, 2025	Best Director	Clint Bentley	Nominated	
Seattle Film Critics Society	December 15, 2025	Best Actor in a Leading Role	Joel Edgerton	Nominated	
Seattle Film Critics Society	December 15, 2025	Best Actor in a Supporting Role	William H. Macy	Nominated	
Seattle Film Critics Society	December 15, 2025	Best Screenplay	Clint Bentley and Greg Kwedar	Nominated	
Seattle Film Critics Society	December 15, 2025	Best Cinematography	Adolpho Veloso	Nominated	
Seattle Film Critics Society	December 15, 2025	Best Costume Design	Malgosia Turzanska	Nominated	
Seattle Film Critics Society	December 15, 2025	Best Pacific Northwest Feature Film	Clint Bentley	Won	
Society of Composers & Lyricists	February 6, 2026	Outstanding Original Score for an Independent Film	Bryce Dessner	Won	
Southeastern Film Critics Association	December 16, 2025	Top Ten Films	Train Dreams	7th place	
Southeastern Film Critics Association	December 16, 2025	Best Adapted Screenplay	Clint Bentley and Greg Kwedar	Runner-up	
St. Louis Film Critics Association Awards	December 14, 2025	Best Adapted Screenplay	Clint Bentley and Greg Kwedar	Nominated	
St. Louis Film Critics Association Awards	December 14, 2025	Best Cinematography	Adolpho Veloso	Runner-up	
St. Louis Film Critics Association Awards	December 14, 2025	Best Vocal Performance	Will Patton	Won	
Stockholm International Film Festival	November 14, 2025	Golden Horse	Train Dreams	Nominated	
Vancouver Film Critics Circle	February 23, 2026	Best Actor	Joel Edgerton	Nominated	
Washington D.C. Area Film Critics Association	December 7, 2025	Best Actor	Joel Edgerton	Nominated	
Washington D.C. Area Film Critics Association	December 7, 2025	Best Adapted Screenplay	Clint Bentley and Greg Kwedar	Nominated	
Washington D.C. Area Film Critics Association	December 7, 2025	Best Cinematography	Adolpho Veloso	Nominated	
Writers Guild of America Awards	March 8, 2026	Best Adapted Screenplay	Clint Bentley and Greg Kwedar	Nominated	
