= The Plague (2025 film) =

Psychological drama thriller film

- US theatrical release poster
- Directed by: Charlie Polinger
- Written by: Charlie Polinger
- Produced by: Lizzie Shapiro; Lucy McKendrick; Joel Edgerton; Roy Lee; Steven Schneider; Derek Dauchy
- Starring: Everett Blunck; Kayo Martin; Kenny Rasmussen; Joel Edgerton
- Cinematography: Steven Breckon
- Edited by: Simon Njoo; Henry Hayes
- Music by: Johan Lenox
- Production companies: Spooky Pictures; The Space Program; Hellcat; Five Henrys; Image Nation Abu Dhabi
- Distributed by: Independent Film Company
- Release dates: May 16, 2025 (Cannes); December 24, 2025 (United States)
- Running time: 98 minutes
- Countries: United States; Romania
- Language: English
- Box office: $685,153

The Plague is a 2025 thriller film written and directed by Charlie Polinger in his directorial debut. It stars Everett Blunck, Kayo Martin, Kenny Rasmussen, and Joel Edgerton, who was also a producer. In the film, a twelve-year-old boy (Blunck) arrives at the Tom Lerner Water Polo Camp as a socially anxious outsider. Desperate to fit into the ruthless social hierarchy, he aligns himself with a group of popular boys led by Jake (Martin).

The Plague premiered at the Un Certain Regard section of the 2025 Cannes Film Festival on May 16, 2025, and had limited theatrical release in the United States on December 24, 2025, before expanding nationwide on January 2, 2026. It received critical acclaim.

== Plot ==
In 2003, middle schooler Ben is attending a water polo summer camp, led by coach "Daddy Wags", that includes a popular boy, Jake, his group of friends, and the eccentric misfit Eli. Anxious to fit in, Ben attempts to befriend the callous Jake, which includes willingly joining in with his friends' bullying and exclusion of Eli, who suffers from a mysterious skin disorder (implied to be a fungal infection), which Jake and his circle call "the plague", a mythical disease that affects mental and motor functions. Eli is ambivalent about his outsider status, and Ben, growing empathetic to his situation and feeling guilty about his treatment, eventually connects with him in private after being annoyed by Jake's behavior. In the locker room when Ben and Eli are alone, Ben offers to apply clotrimazole, an anti-fungal cream, to the rash on Eli's back.

Jake starts a rumor that Ben has contracted the plague from Eli, and the others begin to avoid and torment him, much to Ben's distress. Though he denies the accusation, he discovers that he also has the mysterious skin disorder, which begins to spread over his body. After being humiliated one night after a wet dream, he attempts to run away from the camp, but Daddy Wags convinces him to return with a lukewarm pep talk. The next day, Ben witnesses Daddy Wags reprimanding Jake in private. When later confronted by Jake, Ben denies being responsible and suggests Eli may have been. Jake continues to suspect Ben. That night, Jake and the other boys vengefully dump cockroaches over Ben while he sleeps, then trap him underneath his blanket. During a practice game, Ben plays aggressively against Jake, culminating in scratching him and drawing blood. In retaliation, a furious Jake punches him and attempts to drown him, leading to his expulsion from the program.

The summer camp hosts a co-ed dance, during which Eli dances alone with a cardboard cutout he had found during an earlier outing. Upset that Eli still refuses to fit in, Ben breaks the cutout, leading an upset Eli to depart to repair it. Ben follows him to the locker room and berates him for his attitude and behavior, arguing that nobody will want to befriend him if he continues to be himself. A tearful and distraught Eli cuts off one of his fingers with a pair of scissors, and he leaves for the hospital with Daddy Wags. Covered in Eli's blood, Ben returns to the event, where he begins to dance in the same wild, uninhibited way as Eli had earlier in the film, ignoring the stares of the others around him.

== Cast ==
- Everett Blunck as Ben
- Kayo Martin as Jake
- Kenny Rasmussen as Eli
- Joel Edgerton as Daddy Wags
- Lennox Espy as Julian
- Lucas Adler as Logan
- Elliott Heffernan as Tic Tac
- Caden Burris as Matt
- Kolton Lee as Corbin

== Production ==
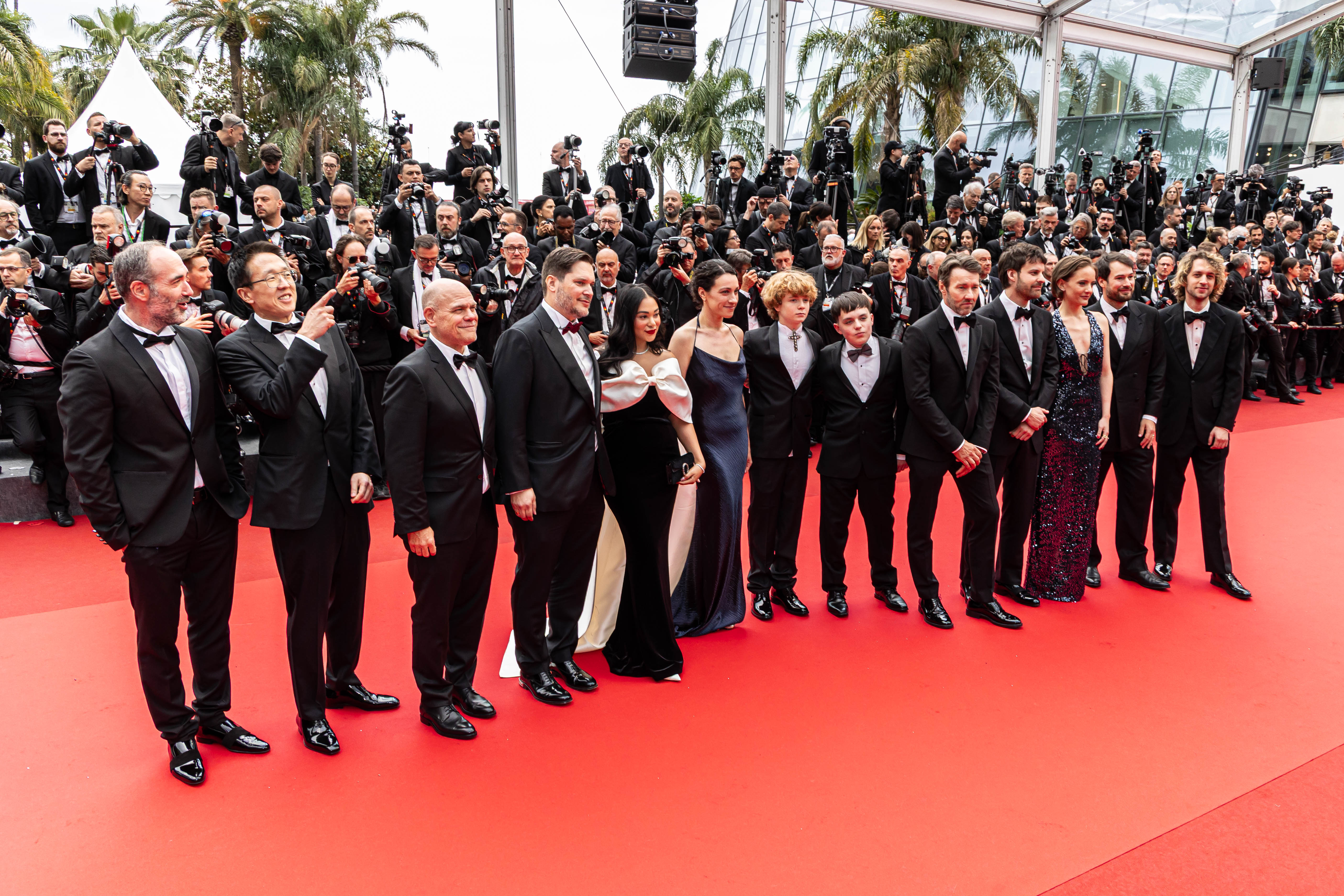
Cast and crew of the film at the Cannes Film Festival 2025

Initially, when Joel Edgerton received the script by Charlie Polinger, he wanted to direct the film; however, Polinger wanted to, with Edgerton instead offering to help get it made. Polinger set out to "capture a social dread and vulnerability of your body and something you don't see as much with boys because it requires a certain vulnerability to be an object of terror in that way", and cites The Shining, Full Metal Jacket, and Beau Travail as primary sources of inspiration.

The film was shot on 35 mm film in Bucharest, Romania.

== Release ==
The film had its world premiere at the 2025 Cannes Film Festival on May 16, 2025, in the Un Certain Regard section. In August 2025, Independent Film Company acquired North American distribution rights to the film, giving it a theatrical release in the United States on December 24, 2025, before expanding nationwide on January 2, 2026.

In addition to Cannes, the film played at the Deauville American Film Festival, Fantastic Fest, Sitges Film Festival, Chicago International Film Festival, AFI Fest, SCAD Savannah Film Festival, Miami Film Festival, St. Louis International Film Festival, and many others.

== Reception ==
=== Critical response ===
The film was met with critical acclaim and a warm reception at Cannes. It received an eleven minute standing ovation, making it the longest standing ovation for both a debut director and a film competing within the Un Certain Regard section in the history of the festival. It was described as "perhaps the hottest American film at the festival".

On the review aggregator website Rotten Tomatoes, 97% of 120 critics' reviews are positive, with an average rating of 7.7/10. The website's consensus reads: "Steeped in disquieting mood without ever treading water, The Plague takes common adolescent anxieties and elevates them into an unforgettable chiller." Metacritic, which uses a weighted average, assigned the film a score of 79 out of 100, based on 21 critics, indicating "generally favorable" reviews.

=== Accolades ===
Award	Date of ceremony	Category	Recipient	Result	Ref.
Cannes Film Festival	May 24, 2025	Un Certain Regard Award	Charlie Polinger	Nominated	
Cannes Film Festival	May 24, 2025	Camera d'Or	Charlie Polinger	Nominated	
Cannes Film Festival	May 24, 2025	Best Sound Creation Award	The Plague	Won	
Deauville American Film Festival	September 13, 2025	Grand Prize	The Plague	Won	
Deauville American Film Festival	September 13, 2025	Critics Prize	The Plague	Won	
Fantastic Fest	September 23, 2025	Best Picture (Main Competition)	The Plague	Won	
Calgary International Film Festival	September 23, 2025	Grand Jury Prize	The Plague	Won	
Orcas Island Film Festival	October 1, 2025	Jean-Marc Vallée Vanguard Award	Charlie Polinger	Won	
Denver Film Festival	October 16, 2025	Breakthrough Director Prize	Charlie Polinger	Won	
Sitges Film Festival	October 18, 2025	Best Feature Film	The Plague	Nominated	
Sitges Film Festival	October 18, 2025	Best Actor	Everett Blunck, Kayo Martin, Kenny Rasmussen, Joel Edgerton, Lucas Adler, Caden Burris, Lennox Espy, Elliott Heffernan, Kolton Lee	Won	
Woodstock Film Festival	October 18, 2025	Best Feature, Narrative	The Plague	Won	
Woodstock Film Festival	October 18, 2025	Best Cinematography	Steven Breckon	Nominated	
Woodstock Film Festival	October 18, 2025	Best Editing, Narrative	Simon Njoo	Won	
Indiana Film Journalists Association	December 8, 2025	Best Film	The Plague	Nominated	
Indiana Film Journalists Association	December 8, 2025	Best Original Screenplay	The Plague	Nominated	
Indiana Film Journalists Association	December 8, 2025	Best Director	Charlie Polinger	Nominated	
Indiana Film Journalists Association	December 8, 2025	Best Lead Performance	Everett Blunck	Nominated	
Indiana Film Journalists Association	December 8, 2025	Best Ensemble Acting	The Plague	Nominated	
Indiana Film Journalists Association	December 8, 2025	Best Cinematography	The Plague	Nominated	
Indiana Film Journalists Association	December 8, 2025	Best Score	The Plague	Nominated	
Indiana Film Journalists Association	December 8, 2025	Breakout of the Year	Everett Blunck	Nominated	
Indiana Film Journalists Association	December 8, 2025	Breakout of the Year	Charlie Polinger	Nominated	
Indiana Film Journalists Association	December 8, 2025	Original Vision	The Plague	Nominated	
Austin Film Critics Association	December 10, 2025	Best First Film	The Plague	Nominated	
New York Film Critics Online	December 15, 2025	Debut Director	Charlie Polinger	Runner Up	
New York Film Critics Online	December 15, 2025	Breakthrough Performer	Everett Blunck	Nominated	
New York Film Critics Online	December 15, 2025	Breakthrough Performer	Kayo Martin	Nominated	
Philadelphia Film Critics Circle	December 20, 2025	Best Directorial Debut	Charlie Polinger	Won	
Portland Critics Association	December 31, 2025	Best Horror Feature	The Plague	Nominated	
Critics Choice Awards	January 4, 2026	Best Young Actor/Actress	Everett Blunck	Nominated	
Directors Guild of America Awards	February 7, 2026	Michael Apted Award for Outstanding Directorial Achievement in First-Time Theatrical Feature Film	Charlie Polinger	Won	
Film Independent Spirit Awards	February 15, 2026	Best Feature	Derek Dauchy, Joel Edgerton, Roy Lee, Lucy McKendrick, Steven Schneider, and Lizzie Shapiro	Nominated	
Film Independent Spirit Awards	February 15, 2026	Best Lead Performance	Everett Blunck	Nominated	
Film Independent Spirit Awards	February 15, 2026	Best Breakthrough Performance	Kayo Martin	Won	

== See also ==
- Psychological thriller
- List of thriller films of the 2020s
- List of drama films of the 2020s
