= Michael Heimler =

American film producer

- Occupation: Film producer

Michael Heimler is an American film producer. He was nominated for an Academy Award in the category Best Picture for the film Train Dreams.

In 2021, Heimler was ranked 34th on a list by Variety of Hollywood's New Leaders.

== Selected filmography ==
- Train Dreams (2025; co-nominated with Marissa McMahon, Teddy Schwarzman, Will Janowitz and Ashley Schlaifer)
