= This Is Where We Live =

This Is Where We Live may refer to:

- This Is Where We Live (album), a 2004 album by Paco
- This Is Where We Live (film), a 2013 American drama film
