= Anja Marquardt =

German film director

- Occupation: Film director

Anja Marquardt is a German film director who won two major international film awards for her first feature film She's Lost Control. Marquardt was previously known for her screen-writing and directing of critically acclaimed short films. Her first full-length movie explored the emotional journey of a young female student who works as a sexual surrogate and falls in love with an unusually recalcitrant client. Marquardt stated that she intended "not to write a love story, but an anti-love story." In 2019, Marquardt wrote and directed the third season of the American television series The Girlfriend Experience.

== Early life ==
A child of German parents, Marquardt was born and raised in the divided city of Berlin, Germany. After completing her secondary school education, she enrolled in the interdisciplinary "Communication in Social and Economic Contexts" program at the Berlin University of the Arts. Marquardt started traveling extensively and lived for brief periods in Arizona, Granada, Strasbourg, and Laos.

== Career ==
After graduating from the University of the Arts in Berlin, Marquardt spent a number of years working in film project development and production in Germany. Subsequently she worked in France as a commissioning Fiction editor for the Franco-German TV network ARTE. In 2007, Marquardt was accepted as a Dean's Fellow in the Tisch School of the Arts at New York University to pursue graduate studies in the Master of Fine Arts program. She led and collaborated on several short film projects as a writer, producer and director as well as in ancillary roles. Her short film "Thanksgiving", one of her earliest works, won the "best student short award" at the Cinequest Film Festival in 2009 and "best short film" at the 92YTribeca Showcase in 2010. A short documentary "Our Lady of Mercy" premiered in a screening at the Cannes Film Festival in 2009. Marquardt graduated from New York University with a MFA degree in 2013.

Marquardt’s first full-length feature, the low-budget drama film She's Lost Control, was completed in 2014. The script was inspired by Marquardt's studies of Japanese caretaker robots who touch patients to make them feel calmer and the sex therapy concepts of Masters and Johnson. In the film, Marquardt explores the interactions and emotional stresses that arise in the triangle of a therapist, sexual surrogate and patient. The movie project was financed with seed funding from the German Consulate General in New York and through a Kickstarter campaign. It was executive-produced by award-winning director Oren Moverman. The film, which premiered at the Berlin Film Festival in Germany in 2014, won the Forum's section top award, the CICAE International Confederation of Art Cinemas Award. She's Lost Control had its premiere in the U.S. at the SXSW Film Festival and its initial screening in New York City at the New Directors/New Films Festival at the Film Society of Lincoln Center and MoMa, where the curators described it as a "stylish, deeply unnerving, and profound film on an intangible modern issue". The film was released to general audiences in the U.S. in March and in Germany in May, 2015.

== Awards ==
In recognition of her prize-winning work in cinematography, Marquardt was awarded a prestigious Villa Aurora Fellowship in 2016.

== Filmography ==
Short film

| Year | Title | Director | Writer | Producer | Ref. |
|---|---|---|---|---|---|
| 2008 | Thanksgiving | Yes | Yes | No | |
| 2008 | Nine Lives | Yes | Yes | Yes | |
| 2009 | Slim and Lena | No | No | Yes | |
| 2010 | Harrow Island | Yes | Yes | No | |

Feature film

| Year | Title | Director | Writer | Ref. |
|---|---|---|---|---|
| 2014 | She's Lost Control | Yes | Yes | |

== Awards and nominations ==
| Year | Title | Award/Nomination |
|---|---|---|
| 2008 | Thanksgiving | Nominated – Cleveland International Film Festival (2009); Won – Best Short Film, Cinequest Film Festival (2009); Won – 92YTribeca Showcase (2010) |
| 2010 | Harrow Island | Won – Best Ensemble Cast Award, First Run Film Festival (2010); Nominated – SAG Foundation Showcase(2011) |
| 2014 | She's Lost Control | Won – International Confederation of Art Cinemas Award, Berlin International Film Festival; Nominated – Best First Feature Award, Berlin International Film Festival; Nominated – Gamechanger Award, SXSW Film Festival; Nominated – Jeonju International Film Festival; Nominated – Adrienne Shelly Foundation Award, Nantucket Film Festival; Nominated – Vladivostok International Film Festival; Nominated – Festival du Nouveau Cinéma Montréal; Won – Best Actress Award (for Brooke Bloom), Thessaloniki International Film Festival; Nominated – Best First Feature & Best First Screenplay, Film Independent Spirit Awards |
