= She's Lost Control (film) =

- Film poster
- Directed by: Anja Marquardt
- Written by: Anja Marquardt
- Produced by: Anja Marquardt; Mollye Asher; Kiara C. Jones
- Starring: Brooke Bloom; Marc Menchaca; Dennis Boutsikaris; Laila Robins; Robert Longstreet
- Cinematography: Zachary Galler
- Edited by: Anja Marquardt; Nick Carew
- Music by: Simon Taufique
- Production companies: SLC Film; Rotor Film
- Distributed by: Monument Releasing
- Release dates: February 9, 2014 (Berlin); March 20, 2015 (United States)
- Running time: 90 minutes
- Country: United States
- Language: English
- Box office: $5,319

She's Lost Control is a 2014 American drama film written and directed by Anja Marquardt in her directorial debut, nominated for two Film Independent Spirit Awards. The film stars Brooke Bloom as Ronah, a sexual surrogate whose professional intimacy with her male clients has begun to take over her personal life. The film premiered at the 64th Berlin International Film Festival on February 9, 2014, where it won the Forum section's top prize, the CICAE International Confederation of Art Cinemas Award, being called a "masterpiece" by the jury. One month later, She's Lost Control had its North American premiere at the SXSW Film Festival, followed by a New York premiere at the New Directors/New Films Festival at Film Society of Lincoln Center and MoMa, where it was described as a "stylish, deeply unnerving, and profound film on an intangible modern issue."

The film was released theatrically in the United States by Monument Releasing on March 20, 2015, in Germany May 14, 2015, and in France July 23, 2015. The title is a reference to the Joy Division song.

== Plot ==
While studying for her master's degree, Ronah works as sexual surrogate in New York City under therapist Dr. Alan Cassidy. Cassidy refers to her a new client, Johnny, a man with intimacy issues. On their first appointment, Johnny drinks alcohol, which Ronah discourages, though she says he can discuss the matter with Cassidy. Johnny's hostility to Ronah's attempts to get him to open up eventually leads him to reveal in one session that he does not trust her and desires to strangle her. In her progress reports with Cassidy, Ronah confirms her desire to continue working with him, as she does not want to give up on him. Johnny continues to drink during their sessions, citing a guideline from Cassidy that one drink before their session is fine.

While Ronah works with her clients, she experiences increasing stress in her personal life. Her apartment building's maintenance man breaks through the wall in her shower to reach a leaky pipe on a complaint by her neighbor, then leaves the hole unfixed for weeks. Her brother contacts her via video chat with news that their mother, suffering from dementia, has gone missing. When he chastises her for not being more involved in their mother's care, she says she has been busy with her studies and work. She offers money, which he declines. She has also been freezing her eggs to make getting pregnant easier in the future, as she does not have a boyfriend. Ronah becomes friendly with her neighbor, but later finds her neighbor has filed a lawsuit against the superintendent; in turn, the superintendent has filed suit against Ronah.

Although Johnny slowly warms to her, he remains distrustful and occasionally hostile. Their sessions progress from looking directly in each other's eyes and non-sexual touching to eventually include genital contact. Pleased that Johnny has opened enough to allow this, Ronah reports this to Cassidy. She also confers with her mentor, Irene, who has taken a teaching position. As they discuss difficult cases, Ronah asks how to handle when one party falls in love with the other. As they talk about falling in love with clients, Irene recommends a healthy social life outside of professional relationships. However, Ronah becomes increasingly obsessed with Johnny and follows him to the hospital where he works as a nurse anesthetist to spy on him. When she sees him flirt with a coworker, she becomes jealous.

In their next session, Ronah demands that Johnny describe any sexual relationships he has outside of their own; he refuses. At the same time, she becomes more open and answers his questions about her own personal life. After they have sex, she stays with him overnight. Johnny leaves the bed and angrily yells at his reflection in the mirror. Concerned, Ronah asks him what's wrong, and he angrily lashes out at her, accusing her of faking her intimacy with him. After he beats her, she goes to the police. They offer to enact a restraining order, but she leaves before filing charges. Ronah attempts to contact her neighbor to no avail, and takes a harassing phone call from a prior client. Overwhelmed, she begins crying. Later, after being treated at a hospital for her wounds, her brother picks her up and remarks that her make-up causes her to look older.

== Cast ==
- Brooke Bloom as Ronah
- Marc Menchaca as Johnny
- Dennis Boutsikaris as Dr. Alan Cassidy
- Laila Robins as Irene
- Tobias Segal as Christopher
- Roxanne Day as Claire
- Ryan Homchick as Andro
- Robert Longstreet as C.T.

== Production ==
Initial production funds for She's Lost Control were raised on the crowdfunding platform Kickstarter, earning a total of $50,081 by November 9, 2012. The film was shot entirely in New York City. Principal photography commenced June 28, 2013.

== Reception ==
Rotten Tomatoes, a review aggregator, reports that 74% of 19 surveyed critics gave the film a positive review; the average rating is 6.8/10. Metacritic rated it rated it 59/100 based on nine reviews.

David Rooney in his review for The Hollywood Reporter described the film as "austerely elegant", "acted with naturalistic intensity", "arrestingly lit and shot, exhibiting a sharp eye for expressive compositions." However, he criticized it as "somewhat overly infatuated with its own dour, subdued style". Marc Adams of Screen International said in his review that there's "much to admire in Marquardt’s control and precision as well as a well sustained lead performance by lead actress Brooke Bloom (...) Brooke Bloom is impressive... while Menchaca is equally impressive." Adams called the film "astutely cold and compelling", "unglossy and taut." Eric Kohn of Indiewire called the film "a fascinating debut" and "engrossing" and graded the film A− by saying that "She's Lost Control strikes a fascinating mood between slow-building angst and cold remove not unlike the Joy Division song that provides its title." Steve Dollar of The Wall Street Journal featured the film saying its "wintry visual design and tone of isolation feels akin to dystopian science-fiction or a horror film, the kind in which high-rise apartment buildings leak paranoia. Against the chill, Ms. Bloom performs with flesh-and-blood urgency."

In her review for the Los Angeles Times, Katie Walsh finds that the "cinematic style and themes of urban alienation reflect almost a 1970s thriller quality, though the execution is decidedly modern. "She's Lost Control" is a quiet triumph, a true herald of a distinctive and necessary voice in cinema." Ronnie Scheib of Variety wrote that the film's clinical compositions create "an uncomfortable tension" with the warmth of Bloom's acting but could alienate audiences. Stephen Holden of The New York Times wrote that it "sustains a mood of deepening alienation, but the attitude of the movie is too detached for it to be emotionally gripping, and its ending is botched." Kenji Fujishima of Slant Magazine rated it 2.5/4 stars and wrote that although the film "raises a lot of genuinely thought-provoking questions", it "loses control of the most interesting and provocative threads of its vision".

== Accolades ==
List of accolades received by She's Lost Control
Year	Award	Category	Recipients	Result	Ref
2014	Berlin International Film Festival	CICAE Award	Anja Marquardt	Won	
2014	Berlin International Film Festival	Best First Feature	Anja Marquardt	Nominated	
2014	SXSW Film Festival	Gamechanger Award	Anja Marquardt	Nominated	
2014	Thessaloniki International Film Festival	Best Lead Actress	Brooke Bloom	Won	
2014	Jeonju International Film Festival	Best International Feature Film	Anja Marquardt	Nominated	
2014	International Festival of Independent Cinema Off Plus Camera	Best Feature Film	Anja Marquardt	Nominated	
2014	Vladivostok International Film Festival	Best Feature Film	Anja Marquardt	Nominated	
2014	Festival du nouveau cinéma	Best Feature Film	Anja Marquardt	Nominated	
2015	Créteil International Women's Film Festival	Best Feature Film	Anja Marquardt	Nominated	
2015	Independent Spirit Awards	Best First Feature	Anja Marquardt, Kiara C. Jones and Mollye Asher	Nominated	
2015	Independent Spirit Awards	Best First Screenplay	Anja Marquardt	Nominated	
