= On a Roll =

2019 promotional single by Ashley O

Promotional single by Ashley O
- B-side: "Right Where I Belong"
- Released: June 14, 2019
- Genre: Dance-pop
- Length: 2:34
- Label: RCA; Null Corporation
- Songwriters: Charlie Brooker; Trent Reznor
- Producer: The Invisible Men

Music video
- "On a Roll" on YouTube

"On a Roll" is a song by fictional character Ashley O, recorded by American singer and actress Miley Cyrus for the Black Mirror episode "Rachel, Jack and Ashley Too". It is an adaptation of the 1989 Nine Inch Nails song "Head Like a Hole". The episode was originally released on June 5, 2019, and the song was released as a promotional digital single by RCA Records and The Null Corporation on June 14, 2019.

The B-side, "Right Where I Belong", is based on the 2005 Nine Inch Nails song "Right Where It Belongs". Nine Inch Nails frontman Trent Reznor approved of the adaptations, and released Black Mirror-themed merchandise to coincide with the episode's release. The song was ranked 28th on the 100 Best Songs of 2019 list by Billboard. The song was not released to radio in the US. Cyrus made Billboard Hot 100 chart history by becoming the first act to chart under three different identities; the third being her Disney character Hannah Montana.

== Background and composition ==
The track interpolates elements of "Head Like a Hole", the 1989 single by American industrial rock band Nine Inch Nails, from their debut studio album Pretty Hate Machine. Therefore, "On a Roll" credits Nine Inch Nails frontman Trent Reznor as a songwriter, and was produced by production trio the Invisible Men. Black Mirror creator Charlie Brooker gained permission from Reznor to use the song, and later re-wrote the lyrics to be "uber-positive" in order to serve as a juxtaposition with the "dark concepts" of the episode. The song is written in the key of G minor in common time with a tempo of 122 beats per minute. BuzzFeed noted online observations that the song's chorus, "Hey yeah woah-ho", sounds like "Hey I'm a hoe", and described it as an example of a mondegreen.

== Critical reception ==
In a positive review, Rolling Stone's Brittany Spanos stated: "The underlying darkness and the disconnect of knowing that a cutesy, capitalistic take on a Nine Inch Nails classic shouldn't work but inexplicably does feels like more danger than [Cyrus]'s been able to extract before." Andrew Unterberger of Billboard assumed that the song would become a bigger hit than Cyrus' previous single "Mother's Daughter" and compared Ashley O to Cyrus early in her career, writing: "It's Miley Cyrus freed from narrative. Sure, it probably helps your enjoyment of 'Rachel, Jack and Ashley Too' to consider how Cyrus' own early career was shaped by handlers who didn't necessarily have her own artistic vision or general best interests in mind, and how she ultimately felt the need to break out from that. But the song? It's just A Bop, one that requires no knowledge of Pretty Hate Machine to appreciate its straightforward catchiness and motivational — if more than a little absurd — lyrics."

== Music video ==
The official music video for "On a Roll" was released on June 13, 2019, on Netflix's official YouTube channel.

Andrew Unterberger of Billboard described the video as "[splitting] the difference between 'Bad Romance'-era Gaga and 'California Gurls'-era Katy Perry in a way that would've certainly made it a YouTube smash."

== Live performances ==
Cyrus performed "On a Roll" and "Head Like a Hole" live on June 30, 2019, during her set at Glastonbury Festival 2019 in Pilton, Somerset.

== Track listing ==
All tracks are written by Trent Reznor.

No.	Title	Length
1.	"On a Roll"	2:34
2.	"Right Where I Belong"	2:11
Total length:		4:45

On a Roll – Remixes
No.	Title	Length
1.	"On a Roll" (DallasK Remix)	3:04
2.	"On a Roll" (Basic Tape Remix)	3:00
3.	"On a Roll" (KDA Remix)	3:10
4.	"On a Roll" (Junior Vasquez Remix)	4:23
5.	"On a Roll" (Wax Wings Remix)	3:50
Total length:		17:27

== Credits and personnel ==
Credits adapted from Tidal.

- Miley Cyrus – vocals
- Charlie Brooker – songwriting
- Trent Reznor – songwriting
- Chiara Hunter – backing vocals
- The Invisible Men – production, mixing engineers
- Dylan Cooper – keyboards, programming
- George Astasio – keyboards, programming
- Jason Pebworth – keyboards, programming
- Jon Shave - keyboards, programming, recording engineering
- Murray C. Anderson – recording engineering
- Jethro Harris – assistant engineering

== Charts ==
Chart (2019)	Peak position
Australia (ARIA)	86
Canada Hot 100 (Billboard)	77
Czech Republic Singles Digital (ČNS IFPI)	49
Hungary (Single Top 40)	26
Hungary (Stream Top 40)	36
Ireland (IRMA)	35
Latvia (LAIPA)	27
Lithuania (AGATA)	21
New Zealand Hot Singles (RMNZ)	18
Scottish Singles Sales (Official Charts)	44
Slovakia Singles Digital (ČNS IFPI)	31
UK Singles (Official Charts)	65
US Bubbling Under Hot 100 (Billboard)	16
US Dance Club Songs (Billboard)	3
US Rolling Stone Top 100	99
