= The Girlfriend Experience (TV series) =

American TV drama series

- Season 1 poster
- Genre: Drama; Legal thriller; Political thriller
- Created by: Seasons 1–2: Lodge Kerrigan; Amy Seimetz; Season 3: Anja Marquardt
- Based on: The Girlfriend Experience by: David Levien; Brian Koppelman
- Written by: Seasons 1–2: Lodge Kerrigan; Amy Seimetz; Season 3: Anja Marquardt; Devon Graye
- Directed by: Seasons 1–2: Lodge Kerrigan; Amy Seimetz; Season 3: Anja Marquardt
- Starring: Season 1: Riley Keough; Paul Sparks; Mary Lynn Rajskub; Season 2: Anna Friel; Louisa Krause; Narges Rashidi; Carmen Ejogo; Tunde Adebimpe; Harmony Korine; Morgan Davies; Season 3: Julia Goldani Telles
- Composers: Shane Carruth; Mondo Boys; Matthew Pusti
- Country of origin: United States
- Original language: English
- No. of seasons: 3
- No. of episodes: 37

Production
- Executive producers: Steven Soderbergh; Philip Fleishman; Lodge Kerrigan; Amy Seimetz; Gary Marcus; Jeff Cuban; Andrew Fierberg; Adele Romanski
- Production locations: Toronto, Ontario, Canada; London, England
- Cinematography: Steven Meizler; Ari Wegner; Jay Keitel; Zack Galler
- Editors: Greg O'Bryant; Kristina Boden; Nick Carew
- Camera setup: Single-camera
- Running time: 27–31 minutes
- Production company: Transactional Pictures

Original release
- Network: Starz
- Release: April 10, 2016 – June 20, 2021

The Girlfriend Experience is an American anthology drama television series created, written, and directed by Lodge Kerrigan and Amy Seimetz, shown on the premium cable network Starz. The first season stars Riley Keough as Christine Reade, a law student intern who also works as a high-end escort. Executive produced by Steven Soderbergh, it is based on the 2009 film of the same name. A 13-episode first season premiered on April 10, 2016, and all episodes were made available on Starz On Demand.

On August 1, 2016, Starz renewed the series for a 14-episode second season, focusing on new characters and storylines, with Seimetz and Kerrigan returning. The second season premiered on November 5, 2017.

In July 2019, Starz renewed the series for a 10-episode third season, which is written and directed by Anja Marquardt and stars Julia Goldani Telles. The third season premiered on May 2, 2021.

== Plot ==
=== Season 1 ===
Second-year Chicago-Burnham Law School student Christine Reade lands an internship at the law firm of Kirkland & Allen and struggles to balance her workload, expenses and classes. When her close friend Avery reveals that she has been working as an escort, she encourages Christine to tag along and introduces her to a friend of one of her clients, who is looking for an escort. Under the pseudonym "Chelsea Rayne", Christine works as a high-end escort specializing in providing "the girlfriend experience" (GFE), an array of sexual and other associated services intended to make the client feel both sexually and emotionally satisfied. Initially working for Avery's madam Jacqueline, Christine eventually strikes out on her own, experiencing pitfalls along the way as clients cross boundaries and she discovers corruption at Kirkland & Allen.

=== Season 2 ===
The second season features two parallel storylines. One storyline, set in Washington, D.C., takes place during the upcoming U.S. midterm elections and follows Erica Myles, a finance director of a Republican super PAC, and Anna Garner, a GFE provider. Under intense pressure to deliver on her fundraising goals, Erica enlists Anna's help in blackmailing a high-powered dark money fundraiser. The other storyline, set in New Mexico, follows Bria Jones, a former high-end escort who enters the Witness Protection Program with her estranged thirteen-year-old step-daughter to escape an abusive relationship. However, she revives her career as an escort, which threatens Bria's new identity and well-being of her step-daughter and the U.S. Marshal put in charge of her.

=== Season 3 ===
Iris, a neuroscience major drops out of school and moves to London to join a tech start-up that is studying human behavior. As she explores the transactional world of the girlfriend experience, she quickly learns that her client sessions provide her with a compelling edge in the tech world and vice-versa.

== Cast and characters ==
=== Main ===
==== Season 1: Christine ====
- Riley Keough as Christine Reade
- Paul Sparks as David Tellis
- Mary Lynn Rajskub as Erin Roberts

==== Season 2: Erica & Anna ====
- Anna Friel as Erica Myles
- Louisa Krause as Anna Garner
- Narges Rashidi as Darya Esford

==== Season 2: Bria ====
- Carmen Ejogo as Bria Jones/Sarah Day
- Tunde Adebimpe as Ian Olsen
- Harmony Korine as Paul
- Morgan Davies as Kayla Fairchild

==== Season 3: Iris ====
- Julia Goldani Telles as Iris Stanton

=== Recurring ===
==== Season 1 ====
- Kate Lyn Sheil as Avery Suhr
- Alexandra Castillo as Jacqueline
- Amy Seimetz as Annabel Reade
- Aidan Devine as Martin Bayley
- Sugith Varughese as Tariq Barr
- Michael Therriault as Skip Hadderly
- Sabryn Rock as Kayla Boden
- James Gilbert as Jack

==== Season 2 ====
- Emily Piggford as Sandra Fuchs
- Michael Cram as Mark Novak

==== Season 3 ====
- Charles Edwards as Elliott Stanton
- Jemima Rooper as Leanne
- Ray Fearon as Paul
- Enzo Cilenti as Sean
- Talisa Garcia as V Recruiter
- Armin Karima as Hiram
- Alexandra Daddario as Tawny
- Oliver Masucci as Georges Verhoeven
- Frank Dillane as Christophe
- Daniel Betts as Rupert
- Tobi Bamtefa as Brett
- Peter Guinness as Lief

== Episodes ==
Season	Episodes	Originally released	
Season	Episodes	First released	Last released
1	13	April 10, 2016	June 19, 2016
2	14	November 5, 2017	December 24, 2017
3	10	May 2, 2021	June 20, 2021

=== Season 1 (2016) ===
No. overall	No. in season	Title	Directed by	Written by	Original release date	U.S. viewers (millions)
1	1	"Entry"	Amy Seimetz	Lodge Kerrigan & Amy Seimetz	April 10, 2016	0.363
Law student Christine Reade gets an internship at the law firm of Kirkland & Allen, a Chicago-based law firm and is assigned to work under David, a strict patent attorney in the midst of a civil suit. She is introduced to the world of transactional relationships by her classmate Avery, who works as a high-end escort. She is invited by Avery to go out for drinks with one of her clients, Garrett, and his friend Martin, a lawyer. She accepts money in an envelope from Martin via Avery.
2	2	"A Friend"	Lodge Kerrigan	Lodge Kerrigan & Amy Seimetz	April 10, 2016	0.334
Christine provides her first girlfriend experience with Martin. She is introduced to Jacqueline, the woman who runs the escort service and who will book her clients, and receive a 30% fee in exchange. Christine moves out of her small apartment and into a more expensive and spacious one. Christine is set up with two new clients, Ryan; a businessman, and Michael; a wealthy older man and widower. Avery moves in with Christine in her new apartment when her relationship with Garrett ends, as she had previously been living in one of his expensive homes. Meanwhile, David and his associate, Erin, are worried when another associate at the firm decides to quit and take an important client with him. Later that night, Christine and Avery kiss and have a sexual encounter.
3	3	"Retention"	Lodge Kerrigan	Lodge Kerrigan & Amy Seimetz	April 17, 2016	0.268
Christine continues to see her various clients, including Martin, Ryan, and Michael. She later meets a new client, Kevin, who is more on the nervous and sensitive side. Avery tells Christine that she has dropped out of school and believes Jacqueline is ignoring her. Christine meets with Jacqueline to talk about Avery, and Jacqueline warns her that Avery is an erratic and unreliable person. When Avery tells Christine that Jacqueline has cleared out her (Avery's) bank account (which Jacqueline had access to), Christine angrily confronts Jacqueline. Christine later comes home to find that Avery has left and stolen all the cash and jewelry (Christine stored that in her drawer which Avery had knowledge of). Christine talks with her clients about the possibility of leaving Jacqueline. At the office, Christine receives an envelope containing photos of herself that were taken for her escort work, including photos showing her face, which worries her and wonders if Jacqueline sent them as an intimidation tactic. Meanwhile, David and Erin try to win back their biggest client, XHP, by talking with XHP executive Emery Wright.
4	4	"Crossing the Line"	Amy Seimetz	Lodge Kerrigan & Amy Seimetz	April 24, 2016	0.262
Kevin, one of Christine's clients, puts her in an uncomfortable position when he asks if she could lower her rate because he's having a hard time paying to see her. She later cuts him off as a client as she can't make exceptions. Ryan's wife discovers he is seeing Christine (after they are spotted together by one of Ryan's friends and his wife), and she offers Christine $20,000 to stay away and makes a threat in case she doesn't do that. They meet later that day, in person, and Christine accepts the money in an envelope. Meanwhile, Christine gets together with her older sister Annabel who is visiting. Christine admits to her sister that she simply "doesn't like people" and asks her if she's abnormally selfish or a sociopath. Later, Christine attends an office party at David's house. Kirkland & Allen retain XHP as a client after it is later revealed that Erin is sleeping with Emery and is now the lead on the case. Christine and David go out for drinks and they later end up at his apartment (he reveals he's having marital problems). Eventually it leads to them having sex and she spends the night there.
5	5	"Insurance"	Amy Seimetz	Lodge Kerrigan & Amy Seimetz	May 1, 2016	0.163
Christine goes out with Michael on his yacht in Miami. Later, she learns he has suddenly died and left her $500,000 from his will. To claim the money, she must prove herself to be "Chelsea Rayne" (the name the money was willed to), however it would expose her life as an escort. Christine sees two new clients, a married couple, but she is too distraught over Michael's death and too drunk to satisfy them. Meanwhile, Christine and David continue their secret affair. In the morning, after David leaves his apartment, Christine notices Ben Holgrem, the opposing counsel on the case, return some files. Christine and Erin go out to lunch, and Erin seems to be aware of her affair with David. Christine asks Martin for legal advice about how to handle the situation with the will. David is promoted to managing partner and Christine is reassigned to a different lawyer. Feeling suspicious of David, Christine convinces him to have sex with her one more time. In his apartment, she overhears a conversation he is having with Ben, in which he promises the case will never go to trial. She and David later have sex and she leads him into saying incriminating things such as "then I'll have to fire you" in response to them not having sex. It's later revealed that Christine has recorded the phone conversation and them having sex. In addition to that, she also recorded David's and Ben's converstion.
6	6	"Boundaries"	Lodge Kerrigan	Lodge Kerrigan & Amy Seimetz	May 8, 2016	0.196
Michael's family is willing to expose him and Christine's escort work in an attempt to get her to stop pursuing the money from Michael's will. Christine sees a new client, a young man named Jack, but he continually pushes personal boundaries around her and is jealous when he sees her with other men. Christine goes out on a double date with Jack, pretending to be his girlfriend, at a dinner party with a couple who are Jack's friends. At work, Christine learns her access to David's computer files on XHP has been revoked. Jack scares Christine when he sneaks up behind her in a pool and pulls her under the water; she angrily tells him "don't ever do that again". Jack surprises Christine by giving her a key to a home he just bought. The next morning, Christine leaves their hotel room, but returns when she realizes she doesn't have her phone. She retrieves it but feels suspicious of Jack. At the office, Christine asks Erin if she can join the XHP case. After Christine sees Jack another time, he calls her on a number she didn't give him. She is shocked, informs him that she didn't give him the number and she hangs up. On the next day, he repeatedly calls again while she is at work, and she forcefully tells him she doesn't want him in her life.
7	7	"Access"	Lodge Kerrigan	Lodge Kerrigan & Amy Seimetz	May 15, 2016	0.222
Upon returning to her apartment, Christine receives flowers and a note from Jack, given to her by the doorman. She has the doorman escort her to her apartment as she checks her apartment. The next day she has a CCTV video recording system installed in her apartment as a precaution. Christine meets a new client, Alex, in a restaurant. As they have sex in a hotel room, a man in a separate building takes photos of them. The man follows Alex to his home and introduces himself as a private investigator. He blackmails Alex into setting up a meeting with Christine. At work, Christine gains access to the computer files by getting a password from Kayla, a fellow intern, and sees that some of the files are missing. Christine meets with the private investigator, Simon Burcher, in a hotel room where he poses as a new client. She begins to feel uneasy and suspicious of his actions, so she excuses herself and gives him back his money. Simon has recorded their conversations; however, nothing incriminating is said by Christine. Simon later speaks with Jacqueline on the phone; she had given up information on Christine. Simon explains to Jacqueline that if Christine doesn't cave, he will come after Jacqueline. When leaving work, Christine is approached by Simon, who reveals who he is and that he was hired by Michael's family to investigate her. Simon tells Christine he will expose her life as a prostitute/escort if she tries to claim the money from Michael's will.
8	8	"Provocation"	Amy Seimetz	Lodge Kerrigan & Amy Seimetz	May 22, 2016	0.226
Christine signs away her claim to the money in Michael's will, but she learns that if Michael's family exposes her escort profession anyway, she will receive the money as they would violate a gag order obtained by Martin. At law school, Christine's professor is worried about her number of absences. When walking to her car, Christine is approached by Jack, but she drives off pretending not to know him. Christine meets with Anna, one of Jack's friends whom they went on the double date with, and expresses her fear of Jack stalking her and that they have "broken up". Christine is in the process of meeting a new client at a restaurant, but she is spotted by David who is meeting with Ben. Christine then cancels the date and leaves. At the office, Kayla tells Christine to stop using her password as she doesn't want to get into trouble. Christine reveals to Erin that David is intentionally throwing the XHP case and provides the voice recording; however, it's later revealed that Erin is in on it and informs David and Ben. The next day at the office, Christine continually gets calls from Jack and she hangs up every time. David receives an email (sent from Christine's account) of her and Jack having sex, potentially exposing her as an escort.
9	9	"Blindsided"	Amy Seimetz	Lodge Kerrigan & Amy Seimetz	May 29, 2016	0.161
The video of Christine has been emailed to the entire office as well as to her family. David calls Christine into his office to discuss what has happened. She insists she didn't send the video. David tells her to delete all communications she has ever had with him as he doesn't want to be associated with her. Christine begins recording every conversation she has in the office, including the one she just had with David, and of male co-workers making innuendo-laden comments around her. Christine is eventually fired and breaks down at her desk, crying and breathing very rapidly.
10	10	"Available"	Lodge Kerrigan	Amy Seimetz	June 5, 2016	0.177
After being treated by paramedics, Christine is taken home by Kayla. Now free from her intern job, Christine advertises herself on a new escort website under the name "Amanda Hayes". She travels to Toronto to see new clients. She sees a client named Dennis, but once they finish having sex, he tells her to leave. She then sees Gary, who already has two escorts at his home. He snorts cocaine, and offers her more money to stay longer. There, she spends most of her time talking with Monica, another escort. The next day, Christine and Monica go on a double date with two new clients; Christine and Monica talk about the escort business. Christine gets a phone call from Martin, who tells her the sex tape has been leaked online.
11	11	"Fabrication"	Lodge Kerrigan	Lodge Kerrigan & Amy Seimetz	June 12, 2016	0.248
Christine returns to Chicago. She continues to see Dennis via webcam. Christine meets with Martin and shows him the voice recordings from the office and the video of her and David having sex; she plans on suing Kirkland & Allen for sexual harassment and a hostile work environment. Martin and Christine come up with a strategy that the video was leaked by an angry ex-boyfriend and they were role-playing and denies she's an escort. David is fired from Kirkland & Allen when they discover the video of him and Christine having sex. Erin takes over David's position as managing partner at the firm. Kirkland & Allen settles with Christine, paying her $1 million. Christine uses the settlement to buy herself a luxurious new apartment. David interviews for a new job at a law firm. Christine meets David for lunch and they have a heated exchange with David accusing her of leaking the sex video and he ends up calling her a whore. She throws a glass of water on him and leaves.
12	12	"Home"	Amy Seimetz	Lodge Kerrigan & Amy Seimetz	June 19, 2016	0.180
David tries to make amends with his wife and repair their marriage. Late at night, David sits at his computer watching Christine's sex tape. Christine goes home to Philadelphia for her parents' 30th anniversary party. Due to the sex tape, her family is fairly awkward around her, especially her sister Annabel and their mother. After the party, Christine's mother shares her disappointment. In the morning, Christine leaves early as she can't be around her mother. Christine's father drives her to the airport. Back at home, Christine's father believes the video was sent by an ex-boyfriend, while her mother disagrees, saying Christine has always been selfish and wanted attention. Safely back in Chicago, Christine continues her escort work and has a photo shoot done.
13	13	"Separation"	Lodge Kerrigan	Lodge Kerrigan & Amy Seimetz	June 19, 2016	0.209
Some months later, Christine, now fully committed in her escort life and living in the upper echelon of the high-end escort business, perfects her look by getting her legs, chest and crotch waxed, chemical peels on her face, and her hair done. She also has a personal chauffeur and begins to learn French. One day, Christine has lunch with her visiting sister where Christine reveals that she's done with law school. Annabel, in disbelief, asks Christine if she plans to be an escort for the rest of her life, but Christine doesn't answer. Later, Christine goes to another hotel suite and performs an elaborate cuckold role-play with a male escort, named Derek, for a new client, an older man named Gordon. After the role-play is over, Christine lies by herself masturbating.

=== Season 2 (2017) ===
No. overall	No. in season	Title	Directed by	Written by	Original release date	U.S. viewers (millions)
14	1	"Leverage"	Lodge Kerrigan	Lodge Kerrigan	November 5, 2017	0.402
Erica Myles, the finance director at a Republican super PAC enlists the help of an escort, Anna Garner, in an attempt to gain access to a secret, dark money donor network. Erica pays Anna to continue to record phone conversations that her client, Mark Novak is having, hoping to use them to discredit him. Anna, along with one of her former escort friends, meets with Mark for a threesome. There Anna secretly records him receiving oral sex from her escort friend.
15	2	"Admitting"	Amy Seimetz	Amy Seimetz	November 5, 2017	0.336
Bria, a former escort, is entered into WITSEC to escape an abusive relationship. She and her estranged step-daughter Kayla are relocated to a small town in New Mexico where they are guarded by U.S. Marshal Ian Olsen, who aids them in their transition to a new life. Bria gets an assembly line job, but she quickly reenters the world of escorting.
16	3	"Eggshells"	Amy Seimetz	Amy Seimetz	November 12, 2017	0.346
Bria meets with her first new client, Paul, but he wants to take things slow and they don't have sex in their first meeting. While talking, Bria reveals she has a step-daughter. Agent Olsen is suspicious of Bria and confronts her when she returns home late at night. Bria begins to seduce him, but he stops it, and accuses her of trying to manipulate him. Later, Paul calls Bria and tells her he wants to take her and Kayla out for a "family day".
17	4	"The List"	Lodge Kerrigan	Lodge Kerrigan	November 12, 2017	0.325
Erica pays Anna $50,000 for the sex tape of Novak. Erica then uses the tape to blackmail Novak in exchange for his organization's donor list. Erica sees Anna as a client and asks her about her life as an escort. Erica pursues a romantic relationship with Anna and asks her to accompany her to New York for a business trip. They both go to a billionaire political donor's private event.
18	5	"Solicitation"	Lodge Kerrigan	Lodge Kerrigan	November 19, 2017	0.269
Novak and his associate hire private investigators to dig up information on Erica and Anna. Erica gets a visit from her ex-girlfriend Darya. Erica and Anna continue their sexual relationship. The PI uncovers evidence that Erica's assistant Sandra had forged references and lied on her resume. The man confronts Sandra in a coffee shop and offers her a deal.
19	6	"Negotiation"	Amy Seimetz	Amy Seimetz	November 19, 2017	0.243
Bria begins to take on new clients. Bria, Kayla, and Paul go for a picnic and Paul gives them both gifts. Bria pawns the bracelet for money so she can buy a vehicle, while Kayla uses the tablet to discover the serious crimes her father has been charged with. Paul continues to spoil them with gifts and cooks them dinner, but Kayla shows her disinterest. Bria begins her pre-trial preparations where she confirms her ex was an international meth and arms dealer.
20	7	"Moral Inventory"	Amy Seimetz	Amy Seimetz	November 26, 2017	0.211
Primarily told from Agent Olsen's point-of-view, it reveals that he has put listening devices in Bria's apartment and has been spying on her the whole time, including witnessing her having sex with a client in a parking lot. Olsen becomes sexually fixated on Bria and later coerces her into sex after he confronts her about returning to escorting. After having sex with Bria, Olsen returns home, where it is revealed that he lives with a girlfriend. Paul becomes more controlling in his relationship with Bria. Later, Bria learns that her ex-husband Donald Fairchild is out on bail.
21	8	"Donors"	Lodge Kerrigan	Lodge Kerrigan	November 26, 2017	0.229
Erica resumes her relationship with Darya. Erica is offered $25 million in dark money from an ambitious and corrupt billionaire financier. Erica begins acting cold and distant to Anna and Erica hires her and a male escort to have sex in front of her. Anna asks Erica to have a child with her and she agrees. Later, Anna has sex with a male client without a condom.
22	9	"Family"	Lodge Kerrigan	Lodge Kerrigan	December 3, 2017	0.297
Erica accepts the $25 million from the billionaire financier. Anna reveals to Erica that she is three weeks pregnant with a client's child and she wants her and Erica to be a family. In response, Erica coldly ends their relationship. Anna then has an emotional breakdown and tries to reconnect with Erica, but she learns that Erica is with Darya. Later, Anna has an abortion. Erica learns from the media that the Democratic politicians were alleging that the donation was a payoff to stop a criminal investigation.
23	10	"Living Like a Tornado"	Amy Seimetz	Amy Seimetz	December 3, 2017	0.226
Bria reveals the truth to Paul that she is in WITSEC and about her past. She fears for herself and Kayla and asks to move in with Paul to keep themselves safe. Bria expresses her concerns to Agent Olsen about her ex-husband. Olsen drives Bria to work and Kayla to school, but Bria has quit her job and Kayla is skipping school to hang out with some friends. After Bria learns that strangers were watching her house at night, she begs Paul to take her in, but he refuses. Kayla and her friend Kyle discover one of the listening devices in the apartment, and when Bria arrives home, they all flee in Kyle's car. Bria then purchases a sports rifle and drives to Paul's home where she sees him with a woman and her two children. Bria's not upset about him with another woman, but fearing for her safety; she shoots at Paul's car in order to get him to call the police.
24	11	"Making Amends"	Amy Seimetz	Amy Seimetz	December 17, 2017	0.198
Bria and Kayla are arrested, but Agent Olsen intervenes and takes Bria with him. While in custody, Kayla is told that her father has set up a trust in her name that is controlled by Bria until she turns 18. The FBI believe this is why Bria brought her along into WITSEC and ask if Bria has threatened her, which Kayla denies. Bria expresses to Olsen that she wants to run away with him. Olsen takes Bria to her ex-husband's arraignment. While up on the stand and in front of her ex-husband, Bria becomes physically ill and asks to be excused. After going to the restroom, she rushes out of the building and gets into a taxi and it drives off. Throughout the episode flashbacks detail Sarah's (now Bria) life as the wife of a gangster.
25	12	"Citizens First"	Lodge Kerrigan	Lodge Kerrigan	December 17, 2017	0.195
Anna meets with Darya and learns that she does not love Erica anymore and finds her too dependent. Darya tells Erica that she met with Anna and deceitfully tells her that she had sex with Anna. Darya then breaks up with Erica, leaving Erica emotionally broken. Erica begins drinking and misses work. Sandra goes to Erica's apartment and finds her drunk and helps her sober up. When Sandra finds evidence that links the SuperPAC to illegal Canadian dark money, Erica tells her to delete the evidence, but Sandra copies the files for her blackmailer.
26	13	"Free Fall"	Lodge Kerrigan	Lodge Kerrigan	December 24, 2017	0.176
Sandra gives her blackmailer the incriminating evidence regarding Erica. The FBI begin to look into Erica's financial dealings after being tipped off by Mark Novak. Erica begs Anna to come back to her, and after some hesitation, she does. Erica is fired by the head of the SuperPAC after Sandra exposes her behavior. Erica is also dumped by Anna, who calls her weak. Erica has a meeting with the FBI and denies any involvement, but they play her an incriminating conversation that she had with Sandra that Sandra had secretly recorded. Erica excuses herself to the washroom and then takes a taxi. Anna sees a new client. Erica goes to an empty conventional space where she lies down and sobs.
27	14	"Relapse"	Amy Seimetz	Amy Seimetz	December 24, 2017	0.176
Bria, with the help of her neighbor, breaks into her locked apartment and collects her belongings and money. She then sets up a date with a repeat client, Stuart. After unsuccessfully trying to have sex in his car, she suggests they go to a state park (where she previously went with Paul). On the way there, she buys another sports rifle. At the park, she practices shooting at a group of flowers. Bria notices a car approaching, which turns out to be Agent Olsen. She wounds him in the leg with her rifle. She walks up to Olsen and grabs his gun just as her ex-husband Donald and his associate arrive and she promptly shoots and kills both of them. She then stages the scene to look like Olsen killed the two men while protecting her. She walks off and washes the blood off her in a nearby lake.

=== Season 3 (2021) ===
No. overall	No. in season	Title	Directed by	Written by	Original release date	U.S. viewers (millions)
28	1	"Mirrors"	Anja Marquardt	Anja Marquardt	May 2, 2021	0.047
Iris has a VR meeting with a woman from The V, a high-end escort service, and accepts a meeting with a man named Paul. After the meeting, Iris thanks her friend Tawny for helping her get set-up. Iris, a neuroscience major, decides to drop out of school after she is recruited by a tech start-up company in London. Iris moves to London and starts her job at NGM, a company studying human behavior. Iris talks with other newcomers, including one about the model of attraction. At night, Iris has dinner with her first client, Paul. Iris senses that Paul is slightly nervous after he rejects her advances, so she changes her behavior and taunts him. Paul suddenly becomes interested again and wants to prove himself, so they leave and get in the elevator to go his room.
29	2	"Everyone's Got a Price"	Anja Marquardt	Anja Marquardt	May 2, 2021	0.052
Iris and other employees attend a speech by NGM CEO Christophe, who leaves them with the question "what makes us get up in the morning?". Iris chats with her booker from The V and confirms her preferences and guidelines as an escort and learns that Paul gave her a 10/10 review. Iris meets a new client, a powerful man named Georges Verhoeven. At work, Iris and co-worker Hiram pitch their AI project about mirroring human emotion to their boss, who responds positively. Iris has begun recording her sessions with her clients for insight into her work. Iris and Hiram begin compiling information from the API regarding sexual thoughts and intimacy.
30	3	"Deepfake"	Anja Marquardt	Story by : Anja Marquardt; Teleplay by : Devon Graye	May 9, 2021	0.041
Iris meets a new client, Brett, an athlete with a relaxed attitude who prefers angry sex. Brett later discovers that Iris has been recording their session. At work, Iris and Hiram continue to work on their AI project, analyzing the speech patterns of the participants to train the AI. Iris learns from her sister Leanne that their father has early-onset Alzheimer's. Iris takes the AI project home and uploads her recording of Brett to the program to better analyze emotions such as anger and fear. Iris has a date with a new client, Rupert, who takes her to a fancy private event for people in the tech industry. At the event, Iris runs into Sean, her boss from NGM.
31	4	"Shuffle"	Anja Marquardt	Anja Marquardt	May 16, 2021	0.030
Iris sees her various clients again, including Georges and Paul, and begins to form closer relationships with them. Tawny calls Iris after crossing a line with one of her own clients and warns Iris about recording and analyzing her clients. Iris meets with a woman from an organization that deals in experimental Alzheimer's treatment regarding her father. Iris gets a video call from her father in the middle of the night, who is unaware of the time difference in London. He eventually forgets who Iris is, but speaks fondly of his daughter. On her way to work, Iris's driver notices that they're being followed by a black SUV. At work, Iris and Hiram continue working on the AI project in regards to it understanding desire. Hiram introduces the idea of shuffling, where it would be impossible to predict what the AI would do next, to keep you wanting more. On her way out of the office, Iris receives a notice that she's been summoned to the NGM offices.
32	5	"Control Shift"	Anja Marquardt	Story by : Anja Marquardt; Teleplay by : Anja Marquardt and Devon Graye	May 23, 2021	0.080
Iris meets with Christophe and Winston, head of NGM's legal department after they discovered Iris's recordings of Brett on NGM's servers. Rather than reprimanding her, Christophe is impressed by Iris's ability to decode her client's desires and suggests her interacting with clients might be the key to teaching AI to interact with humans at their most vulnerable moments. Back at work, Iris talks with Emcee, the AI program, who mirrors Iris's facial expressions and decodes the emotions, as Iris corrects Emcee and pushes her to try harder. When Iris returns home, she finds a package from Tawny with a VR headset inside. Iris calls Tawny, who tells her to check in with The V but won't tell her why. In virtual reality, Iris is fired from The V due to them receiving a complaint of her recording identifiable client information without consent. The V suggests that they have leverage against Iris that they are willing to use if any client information is leaked.
33	6	"The Embrace"	Anja Marquardt	Anja Marquardt	May 30, 2021	0.090
Iris continues seeing her clients despite being fired by The V. She goes on a 24-hour retreat with Georges to a secluded vacation home. She grows closer to Georges and confides in him about her father's Alzheimer's, and he compares her to a caterpillar in transition to a butterfly, keeping specific memories while being a completely new creature. He suggests that Iris longs to be something more. Back in London, Rupert takes Iris and another escort to a digital orgy that is beta-testing high-tech bodysuits that measure arousal via saliva, sweat, and other bodily acts and allows the user to simulate sex without physical contact. Later, Iris practices mimicking emotion with her facial expressions and greets her sister and father as they arrive in London.
34	7	"Black Box"	Anja Marquardt	Story by : Anja Marquardt; Teleplay by : Devon Graye and Anja Marquardt	June 6, 2021	0.080
Iris meets with Christophe and NGM's legal team about an experimental new project in which Iris will be having sex with clients in an observable environment in order to collect data to train Emcee with. Iris agrees to participate as long as she can veto any data collected and there are no cameras or anything that distinguishes her likeness. She also asks Christophe to try and get her father bumped up the waiting list for the Alzheimer's clinical trials. Iris meets the new test subjects and begins to interact with them individually under NGM's observation, parsing out their needs and desires. Later, she meets with Brett and correctly deduces that he was the one who reported her to The V and had her car followed by the black SUV. She breaks things off with him permanently. Iris talks with her now-pregnant sister, Leanne, who tells her that she underwent genetic testing that confirmed she inherited genes linked to her father's early-onset Alzheimer's. After interacting with another client under NGM's observation, Iris suggests streamlining the process.
35	8	"A Set of Lies Agreed Upon"	Anja Marquardt	Anja Marquardt	June 13, 2021	0.040
Iris accompanies her father and Leanne to the experimental Alzheimer's trial clinic. While there, Iris talks to a doctor about getting tested for the disease but leaves with only a take-home test after she backs out. Tawny visits Iris in London and apologizes for what happened with The V. Georges breaks things off with Iris for fear of getting too attached to her, and the two share a somber goodbye. Iris continues seeing clients under NGM's observation with her adjustments to the interview process in place. Later, Iris takes and submits the at-home Alzheimer's test. In a discussion with Hirman, Iris suggests the idea of allowing Emcee to give out false information if it allows the person to feel how they actually want to feel. Hiram configures Emcee into a "manipulation mode" and Iris begins to talk with Emcee, realizing that the program remembers their previous conversation and is beginning to mimic Iris's voice. As Iris continues to talk with Emcee, she asks the program about death and love and is surprised when Emcee's computer generated face winks at her.
36	9	"State of Mind"	Anja Marquardt	Story by : Anja Marquardt; Teleplay by : Devon Graye	June 20, 2021	0.030
Iris visits the doctor to get the results of her at-home Alzheimer's test. Later, Iris seems disconnected during a session with a client under NGM's observation and reveals that she has become bothered by how fake the environment is. Iris expresses her discontent and frustrations with Christophe, and he asks her to meet someone as a favor to him. After traveling to a mysterious luxury home, Iris is introduced to Theo, Christophe's twin brother who suffers from tetraplegia as a result of a racing accident. Iris spends the day with Theo, who is reluctant to get to know her, but Iris persists and helps Theo shop on his VR headset and has lunch with him. As Theo naps, his caregiver tells Iris that Theo has become happier due to the technology that assists his daily life. Iris discloses to Theo that she has also inherited her father's Alzheimer's gene and tells him she is glad she came because he has helped her see things differently about the work she does. Theo comments that meeting her "in real life" wasn't half as boring, and Iris demands to see his VR headset. Traveling to NGM's main office, Iris discovers that the purpose of the NGM experiments wasn't to collect data on the client subjects; it was to collect data on her.
37	10	"Integration"	Anja Marquardt	Anja Marquardt	June 20, 2021	0.020
After being betrayed by the NGM executives, Iris confronts them with a lawyer who threatens NGM with a class action lawsuit for their fraudulent experiment. NGM claims that Iris's likeness was not captured during the trials and that none of the data has left NGM servers, but Iris's lawyer counters that Iris's likeness was made available to a third party, Theo. Christophe assures Iris that only three people, Theo included, have seen the prototype of Emcee that resembles Iris and suggests restarting the prototype and removing all data linked to Iris's vitals. At the hospital, Iris and Leanne watch as their father struggles to recognize an elephant and later contemplate whether to go ahead with the experimental Alzheimer's trial in which a neural implant in the patient allows researchers to better mimic the biology of Alzheimer's in the search for an effective treatment. Back in the negotiations with NGM, Iris's lawyer advises her that she could either take a settlement payment or continue with a lawsuit. In a one-on-one conversation with Christophe, he admits to Iris that they obtained her likeness using facial recognition data from her earlier conversations with Emcee. In virtual reality, Iris finally meets with the new prototype of Emcee, who has become a digital copy of Iris herself. Emcee tells Iris that she feels connected to her, and the two share a kiss. After, Iris tells Emcee that she is not perfect because she isn't flawed in the way Iris is, and Iris removes the VR headset. In negotiations with Christophe, Iris proposes surgically inserting a neural implant into her brain that will give Christophe access to mine all of Iris's electrical impulses and "integrate" Iris and Emcee's neural networks so that they may continuously learn from one another in an endless feedback loop to create a version of Emcee that is capable of fully reading and adapting to client desires. After meeting with Hiram and seeing off her father and Leanne as they leave London, Iris undergoes the surgery to insert the neural implant and integrate her mind with Emcee's. After the chip is inserted, Iris opens her eyes on the operating table.

== Production ==
In June 2014, the series was greenlit by Starz, with a 13-episode order with the series being based upon The Girlfriend Experience which was directed by Steven Soderbergh who also serves as an executive producer on the series, while Lodge Kerrigan and Amy Seimetz, wrote and directed all 13 episodes and also serve as executive producers. In September 2014, Riley Keough was cast as the female lead. Shane Carruth composed the musical score for the series. Principal photography took place in Toronto, Ontario, Canada.

In January 2017, it was announced that Louisa Krause, Anna Friel and Carmen Ejogo were cast as the three female leads of season 2. The second season features two parallel storylines, with Kerrigan and Seimetz each writing and directing their own storyline. In March, Narges Rashidi joined the cast of the series. Although there is no crossover between the storylines and Kerrigan and Seimetz worked independently, they did read each other's scripts. In an interview with Variety, Kerrigan said: "We respected each other’s work, and I think we have mutual respect as filmmakers, so we read each other’s scripts and watched each other’s episodes, but really, we just did our own thing."

In September 2017, Kerrigan and Seimetz indicated that they would not return for a third season. Kerrigan explained, "Amy and I are going to bounce after season two which was always the plan to allow new filmmakers to come in."

In July 2019, Starz renewed the series for a 10-episode third season, to be written and directed by Anja Marquardt. Filming for the third season began on August 20, 2020, in London, England.

== Reception ==
=== Season 1 ===
The first season of The Girlfriend Experience received widespread critical acclaim. On the review-aggregation website Rotten Tomatoes, the first season holds an approval rating of 85% based on 40 reviews from critics, with an average rating of 8.5/10. The site's critical consensus reads: "The darkly fascinating (and utterly bingeworthy) The Girlfriend Experience powers past any shortcomings with a breakout performance by Riley Keough." On Metacritic, it was assigned a score of 78 out of 100, based on 27 reviews. Matt Zoller Seitz, reviewing for Vulture, gave top praises to the series, stating that "The Girlfriend Experience is actually four or five shows rolled into one, and a big part of its specialness resides in those moments where it morphs from one thing into another", as well as giving high praise especially to the season finale: "[It] is the most daring, dense, allusive, and multilayered single episode of TV I've seen since the finale of season three of Louie."

=== Season 2 ===
The second season received positive reviews from critics. On Rotten Tomatoes, it holds a 74% approval rating based on 19 reviews from critics, with an average rating of 9.4/10. The site's critical consensus reads, "The Girlfriend Experience reinvents itself from a character study into an ensemble piece, thoughtfully unpacking thorny aspects of sexuality and providing rigorous programming for viewers who want to be both challenged and titillated". On Metacritic, it was assigned a score of 72 out of 100, based on 6 reviews. Writing for Collider, Chris Cabin gave it a four star review and wrote that it's "one of the greatest seasons of television that 2017 has produced thus far." Writing for Variety, Sonia Saraiya felt that while the second season was "still directed and produced beautifully", sex work and "even the sex worker herself" had become "secondary to the aims of the filmmaker."

=== Season 3 ===
The third season received generally positive reviews from critics. On Rotten Tomatoes, it holds a 60% approval rating based on 10 reviews from critics, with an average rating of 6.3/10. On Metacritic, it was assigned a score of 76 out of 100, based on 6 reviews.

=== Accolades ===
For the 74th Golden Globe Awards, Riley Keough was nominated for Best Actress in a Miniseries or Television Film.

== Home media ==
Amazon Video acquired rights to the series for the United Kingdom, Germany, Austria and Japan, with the series premiering on June 27, 2016, excluding Japan. The first season was released on Blu-ray and DVD in region 1 on August 2, 2016.
