= Alone (2020 thriller film) =

American thriller film

- Theatrical release poster
- Directed by: John Hyams
- Written by: Mattias Olsson
- Produced by: Jordan Foley; Jonathan Rosenthal; Mike Macari; Henrik JP Akesson
- Starring: Jules Willcox; Marc Menchaca; Anthony Heald
- Cinematography: Federico Verardi
- Edited by: Scott Roon; John Hyams
- Music by: Nima Fakhrara
- Production companies: Mill House Motion Pictures; Paperclip Ltd.; XYZ Films
- Distributed by: Magnet Releasing
- Release date: September 18, 2020
- Running time: 98 minutes
- Country: United States
- Language: English
- Budget: $750,000
- Box office: $642,502

Alone is a 2020 American psychological thriller film directed by John Hyams, from a screenplay by Mattias Olsson. The film stars Jules Willcox as a young woman who desperately tries to escape a deranged and bloodthirsty psychopath (Marc Menchaca) in the wilderness. It was released in the United States on September 18, 2020, by Magnet Releasing.

== Plot ==
While driving along a mountainous highway in Oregon to relocate, recently widowed Jessica encounters a hostile driver in a Jeep. As she tries to overtake him, he speeds up, nearly causing a collision with a semi-trailer truck. He then tailgates before veering off. Later, Jessica sees the same Jeep while refueling at a gas station.

After spending the night at a motel, Jessica is about to leave when the man from the Jeep appears, awkwardly apologizing for his earlier behavior. Jessica leaves, but soon encounters him again. He blocks the road, feigning injury with his arm in a sling and asks for a ride, claiming his car has broken down. Jessica, sensing danger, refuses and drives away. Later that night, she crashes when her trailer fishtails, discovering that the tire was slashed. The man appears, breaks into her car and drugs her; she later wakes up locked in a room in his remote cabin. He forces her to recount her husband’s suicide and hints at other previous victims.

The next morning, she hears the man leaving and manages to escape the room. She hides in a closet and overhears him lying to his wife on the phone, claiming he’ll be home soon. When he returns and starts searching for her, she seizes the opportunity to flee into the forest. The man chases her down after she injures her foot, but she escapes by leaping into a fast-flowing river.

Exhausted and in pain, Jessica stumbles upon a hunter named Robert, who offers her food, shoes and a ride. As they drive, their path is blocked by a fallen tree. The man appears once again, claiming that Jessica is his sister who’s having a psychotic episode following her husband’s death. Suspicious, Robert demands the man’s phone to call the police, leading to a violent confrontation where the man kills Robert with his hunting rifle. Jessica runs, triggering another desperate chase. She hides in a cave to escape the rain but is soon found by the man, who shoots her in the shoulder. Bleeding and weak, she submerges herself in a small pond to hide. The man attempts to lure her out but leaves when he fails.

The next morning, while the man disposes of Robert’s body, Jessica sneaks into his Jeep, steals his phone and hides in the trunk. As he drives, she calls 911 and then attacks him with a tire iron, causing him to crash and overturn the vehicle. Dazed, Jessica crawls out and spots a search and rescue helicopter nearby. She rushes into a clearing and, using the phone, calls the man’s wife to reveal the truth about him.

The man, now identified as Sam and severely injured, follows Jessica into the clearing, enraged by her call. She taunts him by putting the phone on speaker, exposing his true nature. In a final confrontation, Jessica overpowers Sam and fatally stabs him. As the helicopter descends, she watches him die, lying in exhausted relief.

== Cast ==
- Jules Willcox as Jessica Swanson
- Marc Menchaca as The Man / Sam
- Anthony Heald as Robert
- Jonathan Rosenthal as Eric

== Production ==
In December 2017, it was announced that Jules Willcox would star in the film. The film is a remake of Olsson's 2011 Swedish film Gone (Försvunnen).

== Reception ==
=== Box office, VOD, and streaming ===
Alone was released in the United States on September 18, 2020 in theaters and on video-on-demand. It grossed $182,473 from 173 theaters in its opening weekend. It was also the most rented film on Google Play, fourth on FandangoNow, and ninth on Apple TV. In its second weekend the film ranked third at Google Play, fourth at FandangoNow, and sixth at Apple TV, then its third weekend finished second at Google Play, third at FandangoNow, eighth at AppleTV, and tenth at Spectrum. The film ranked in Netflix global top 10 chart in 2024 for the week of March 11–17.

=== Critical response ===
On the review aggregator website Rotten Tomatoes, 94% of 63 critics' reviews are positive, with an average rating of 7.1/10. The website's consensus reads: "Alone's minimalistic approach makes this heightened thriller a gripping and suspenseful experience." On Metacritic, the film has a weighted average score of 70 out of 100 based on nine critics, indicating "generally favorable" reviews.

Jeannette Catsoulis of The New York Times wrote: "This minimalist survival thriller unfolds with such elegant simplicity and single-minded momentum that its irritations are easily excused." Kevin Crust of the Los Angeles Times wrote: "Top-tier performances from Jules Willcox and Marc Menchaca provide 98 minutes of heart-pounding diversion." Ignatiy Vishnevetsky of The A.V. Club gave it a B grade, writing: "there's something deeply appealing about an already stripped-down cat-and-mouse scenario that becomes dirtier and more elemental as it goes along, tracing a devolutionary arc from the rules of the road to primeval combat."

Odie Henderson of RogerEbert.com was more critical of the film, giving it a score of 2/4 stars and writing that it "gives us little reason to care if our hero makes it out alive, but I have to give credit where it's due: Jessica isn't written as some damsel in distress." Jeffrey M. Anderson of Common Sense Media gave it 2/5 stars, writing, "this lean thriller works more or less in the ways it's supposed to, but it also has a strong sense of vicious cruelty, and it may leave a bad taste in your mouth."
