= Jules Willcox =

American actress

- Born: Jules Frances Willcox; Lancaster, Missouri, U.S.
- Years active: 2009–present
- Spouse: Eric Alperin (m. 2022)

Jules Frances Willcox is an American actress best known for her leading role in the 2020 psychological thriller film Alone, directed by John Hyams. She has also held recurring roles in various television series, including Servant, Bloodline, and Chicago P.D.

== Early life and education ==
Jules Willcox was born and grew up in the area surrounding Lancaster, Missouri. She graduated from Schuyler County R-1 High School in 1998 and attended the University of Missouri, Columbia. Willcox earned a graduate degree in theater studies from the University of California, Los Angeles.

== Career ==
Willcox has appeared in several films and television series, especially those in the crime, horror and thriller genres. As of 2017, Willcox was represented by Abrams Artists and Untitled Entertainment.

In 2017, it was announced that Willcox would play Jessica in the 2020 psychological thriller Alone, her first leading role in a major feature film. In the film, she plays a woman chased through the wilderness by a murderer, played by Marc Menchaca. Her performance was reviewed positively in Variety and the Los Angeles Times.

Willcox reportedly broke her foot early in the process of filming Alone, and continued to perform many of the stunts in the film.

== Personal life ==
Willcox married Eric Alperin in October 2022.

== Filmography ==
=== Film ===
Year	Title	Role	Notes
2013	Paraphobia	Nikki Navarro	
2013	Snake & Mongoose	Debbie	
2018	Under the Silver Lake	Young drunk woman	
2020	Alone	Jessica Swanson	
2020	Cover Me	Mia Stone	
2020	Dreamkatcher	Becky	
2020	Equal Standard	Kathy McKenzie	
2020	On the Rocks	Mom 1	

=== Television ===
Year	Title	Role	Notes
2009	The Forgotten	Olivia Hatton	
2010	We Are with the Band	Teri Clifford	
2010	CSI: NY	Museum Curator	
2013	Teen Wolf	Dr. Hilyard	
2014	Friends with Better Lives	Fiancée #1	
2017	Bloodline	Julia Degrasse	
2017	Chicago P.D.	Nicole Silver	
2020	Dirty John	Kelsey	
2021	FBI: Most Wanted	Louise LaCroix	
2022	Servant	Mommy	
2022	The L Word: Generation Q	Asia	
2023	Quantum Leap	Elaine Sullivan	
