= Every Time I Die (film) =

2019 film

- Film poster
- Directed by: Robi Michael
- Written by: Robi Michael; Gal Katzir
- Produced by: Robi Michael; Gal Katzir; Tal Lazar; David M. Milch; Robi Michael
- Starring: Drew Fonteiro; Marc Menchaca; Michelle Macedo; Tyler White; Melissa Macedo
- Cinematography: Tal Lazar
- Edited by: Gal Katzir
- Music by: Ran Bagno
- Production companies: MiLa Media; Invisible Films; Latent Images; Giant Hunter Media; Ars Veritas Productions
- Distributed by: Gravitas Ventures
- Release dates: March 8, 2019 (Cinequest Film & Creativity Festival); August 9, 2019 (United States)
- Running time: 98 minutes
- Country: United States
- Language: English

Every Time I Die is a 2019 American thriller film directed by Robi Michael, and written by Michael and Gal Katzir. It stars Drew Fonteiro, Marc Menchaca, Michelle Macedo, Tyler White and Melissa Macedo.

The film had its world premiere at the Cinequest Film & Creativity Festival on March 8, 2019. The film was released on August 9, 2019.

== Synopsis ==
The film follows the story of a man, who after being murdered, finds his consciousness transferred to the bodies of his friends and tries to warn and protect them from the killer who previously murdered him at a remote lake.

== Cast ==
- Drew Fonteiro as Sam
- Marc Menchaca as Jay
- Michelle Macedo as Poppy
- Tyler White as Tyler
- Melissa Macedo as Mia

== Release ==
The film was released on August 9, 2019.

== Reception ==
On Rotten Tomatoes, the film holds an approval rating of 100% based on 10 reviews, with an average of 7.3/10.
