= Rachel, Jack and Ashley Too =

- Black Mirror episode
- Promotional poster
- Episode no.: Series 5 Episode 3
- Directed by: Anne Sewitsky
- Written by: Charlie Brooker
- Cinematography by: Stephan Pehrsson
- Editing by: Tony Kearns
- Original release date: 5 June 2019
- Running time: 67 minutes

Guest appearances
- Miley Cyrus as Ashley Ortiz and the voice of Ashley Too; Angourie Rice as Rachel Goggins; Madison Davenport as Jack Goggins; Susan Pourfar as Catherine Ortiz; Marc Menchaca as Kevin Goggins; Jerah Milligan as Busy G; Daniel Stewart Sherman as Bear; James III as Habanero; Nicholas Pauling as Dr. Munk

Episode chronology
← Previous "Smithereens"	Next → "Joan Is Awful"

"Rachel, Jack and Ashley Too" is the third and final episode of the fifth series of the anthology series Black Mirror. The episode was written by series creator and showrunner Charlie Brooker and directed by Anne Sewitsky; it was released on Netflix on 5 June 2019, alongside "Striking Vipers" and "Smithereens".

It follows Ashley O (Miley Cyrus), a pop singer whose creativity is restricted by her controlling aunt, and Rachel (Angourie Rice) and Jack Goggins (Madison Davenport), teenage sisters who have recently lost their mother. The doll Ashley Too, owned by Rachel, is a clone of Ashley O's personality. Brooker based the episode on a sitcom script he had written years prior, about a punk band who are hanged and return to life to find their manager profiting off their deaths. It was also informed by holographic performances featuring deceased artists.

The executive producers thought Cyrus would be perfect for the role, but were surprised when she agreed. Filming took place in late 2018, for five weeks, in Cape Town, South Africa. Ashley O performs "On a Roll" and "Right Where I Belong" during the episode—these are adaptations of Nine Inch Nails songs. "On a Roll" was released by Cyrus, subsequently appearing on several national music charts as well as receiving a Guild of Music Supervisors Award nomination.

Critics found it to be more upbeat than most Black Mirror episodes. Ashley O's storyline was compared to Cyrus's own life, along with those of other figures in the music industry. Some reviewers analysed personality traits of Rachel and Jack as a reaction to their mother's death. Most critics found the episode lacking in structure, writing quality, exploration of themes and characterisation of Rachel, but Cyrus's acting received acclaim.

== Plot ==
After the death of their mother, Rachel Goggins (Angourie Rice) and her bass-playing older sister Jack (Madison Davenport) live with their father, Kevin (Marc Menchaca), who spends most of his time attempting to invent and promote mouse-control devices. Having recently moved, Rachel has no friends. For her fifteenth birthday, she receives Ashley Too (voiced by Miley Cyrus), an interactive artificially intelligent robotic doll of her favourite pop star Ashley O (Miley Cyrus). Ashley Too encourages and tutors Rachel, who treats her as a friend, but their relationship annoys Jack. Rachel dances to Ashley O's song "On a Roll" at a school talent contest, but fumbles the end of her routine and leaves the stage embarrassed. Jack blames Ashley Too for Rachel's chagrin and hides the doll; Rachel accuses Jack of suppressing both Rachel's and her own creativity.

Meanwhile, the real Ashley O is unsatisfied with her life and wants to reinvent herself as a rock musician. When she writes broody music and does not take the medication given to subdue her, her controlling aunt and manager, Catherine Ortiz (Susan Pourfar), laces her food with drugs to render her comatose. She and the unscrupulous Doctor Munk begin to extract commercially viable music material from Ashley's brainwaves. When the news reports that the coma was caused by a shellfish allergy, Jack apologetically returns Ashley Too to Rachel, who shows no interest.

Six months later, Ashley Too reactivates and begins to glitch out after seeing a news report on Ashley O's coma. Jack connects the doll to the diagnostic software Kevin uses for his humane mousetrap inventions and removes a limiter. Ashley Too reveals herself to be a duplicate of Ashley O's entire consciousness, and persuades Rachel and Jack to look for evidence of Catherine's crimes at her house. Jack inexpertly drives them there, then poses as a pest control technician while Rachel takes Ashley Too to where Ashley O lies comatose. The doll unplugs the life support to let her real self die, but it transpires that the machine was actually perpetuating the coma, and Ashley wakes up. Jack and Rachel subdue two staff members with Kevin's mouse stunner and a sedative syringe and flee the house with both Ashleys.

Ashley O directs the group to a venue where Catherine is debuting Ashley Eternal, a holographic replacement for Ashley O. Pursued by the police after Jack runs a red light, the group drives through the back entrance of the venue, dismaying Catherine and astonishing the crowd as Ashley O emerges on stage.

During the credits, Ashley O (now billed as "Ashley Fuckn O") performs the song "Head Like a Hole" in her pop rock style at a smaller venue, with Jack on bass. Rachel and Ashley Too watch while Kevin talks to the bartender about the venue's pest control. Two dissatisfied fans leave the concert as Ashley crowd-surfs.

== Production ==
External videos
- "Rachel, Jack and Ashley Too"; The trailer for "Rachel, Jack and Ashley Too".
- "On a Roll"; Official music video for "On a Roll", an adaptation of "Head Like a Hole" sung by Ashley O (Cyrus).

A fifth series of Black Mirror was commissioned by Netflix in March 2018, three months after the release of series four. Initially part of series five's production, the interactive work Black Mirror: Bandersnatch increased in scope to the point where it was separated from the series and released as a standalone film; it premiered on 28 December 2018. Although previous series of the programme produced under Netflix contained six episodes, series five comprises three episodes, as the series creator Charlie Brooker viewed this as preferable to making viewers wait longer for the next series. The three episodes—"Striking Vipers", "Smithereens" and "Rachel, Jack and Ashley Too"—were released on Netflix simultaneously on 5 June 2019. As Black Mirror is an anthology series, each instalment can be watched in any order.

=== Conception and writing ===
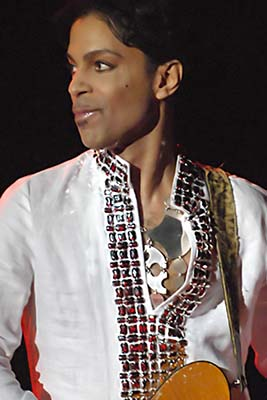
Holographic performances that used the image of dead musicians like Prince were an inspiration for the episode.

The episode was written by Brooker. It was based on a comedy sitcom script from years prior about a 1977 punk band whose members are hanged by a Conservative minister and return to life to see their manager exploiting their deaths for profit. It also took inspiration from real life holographic performances of dead artists such as Prince, Whitney Houston, and Amy Winehouse; Brooker found the holograms "ghoulish" and noted that the subjects "often pass away in extremely tragic circumstances". He also considered AI as a means for creating a program which could imitate John Lennon's songwriting or serve as a celebrity virtual assistant. Brooker said that the episode is not disparaging pop music, but criticising inauthenticity in music. According to Brooker, an unused idea saw Catherine revealed as non-human, either with her face being removed to display the machinery behind it, or with her disappearing "in a puff of smoke". In the final episode, after her Ashley Eternal plan fails, she looks at the camera and breaks the fourth wall.

=== Casting ===
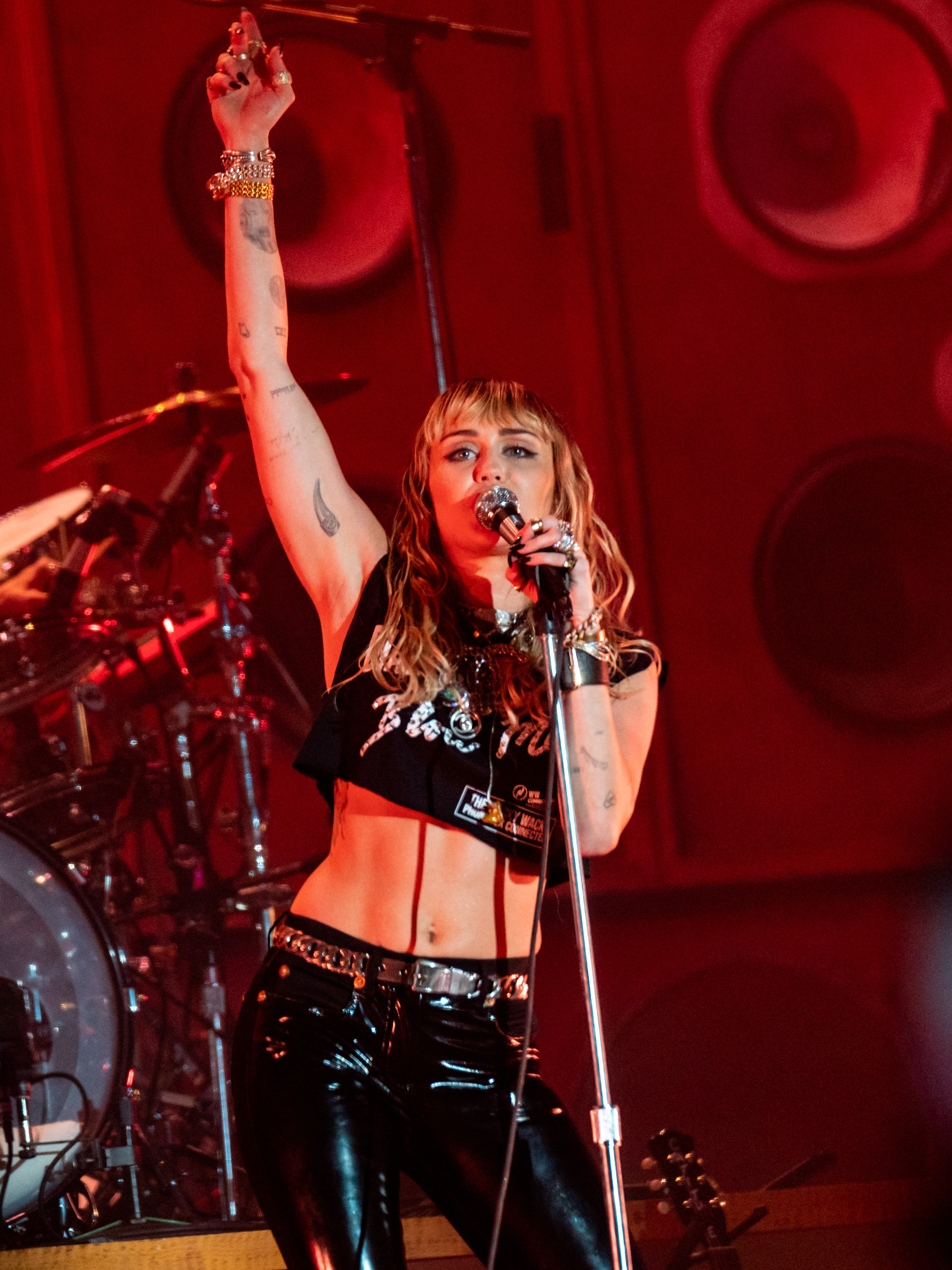
Miley Cyrus was chosen to play the titular character Ashley O as well as voicing the character's robot counterpart, Ashley Too.

Brooker and Jones thought Miley Cyrus would be perfect for the part of Ashley O, but did not expect her to be interested, or that they would get a pop star for the role. However, she was a big fan of the programme, and within a couple of days of their reaching out, she accepted the offer. She found the script's portrayal of the music industry realistic, in terms of its "overt exploitation of artists" and the way in which decisions are driven by performance metrics rather than creativity. Madison Davenport played Jack. She auditioned without knowing that the episode was part of Black Mirror, and was only told about the scene where Jack distracts a bodyguard from investigating Ashley O's IV drip removal. She was sent the full script a few days prior to filming. Angourie Rice, who plays Rachel, auditioned later in the process and knew that it was for Black Mirror.

The executive producer Annabel Jones said that the episode was about a musician trying to find her identity and "break out from the commercial machine". Jones said that Cyrus's personality matched how the episode gets more "heightened and sarcastic and satirical" as it progresses. She also said that Cyrus brought vulnerability to the role, despite her punk-like persona. Cyrus related to Ashley O's desire to explore other genres, something she did after becoming an adult. Cyrus said that her parents took an active role in her career and focused on getting a manager who would take care of her, in stark contrast to Ashley O's manager Catherine. Cyrus contributed ideas about her character's clothing and appearance. She also spoke to Brooker about enjoying a recent performance to a mostly older audience who were not recording the experience on their phones. Some dialogue and ideas from this conversation inspired aspects of Catherine's presentation of Ashley Eternal.

=== Filming and editing ===
While the episode takes place in America, for financial reasons the filming went ahead in Cape Town, South Africa, taking place six days per week for five weeks. After Cyrus was spotted at the Victoria & Alfred Waterfront during filming in November 2018, rumours began that she would appear in the fifth series of Black Mirror. Cyrus said that she was able to "get into Ashley" as she was isolated from friends and family. Problems in her personal life informed her emotions when portraying Ashley O's life breaking down. On the day that she filmed the scene where Ashley O wakes up from the coma, Cyrus had lost her home to a California wildfire. She used the events to inform her acting, though she had to take some breaks during filming the scene.

The Ashley Too doll's movements were partly captured during the shoot, and partly computer-generated imagery. Two crew members controlled her movements—one for her head and arms, and the other for her wheels—and the doll spun around and spoke in real life. Some parts, however, required the actors to film with a green-screen stick, and the doll was added in during editing. The driving scenes were filmed on a sound stage. The final scene was filmed in a Cape Town bar over the course of a few hours, on Cyrus's last day of shooting, with Davenport saying that it "felt like ... a small punk venue". Davenport knew how to play the guitar, but learned the bass guitar over the course of a fortnight for her part in "Head Like a Hole". Cyrus and Davenport recorded the audio in a music studio.

=== Music ===
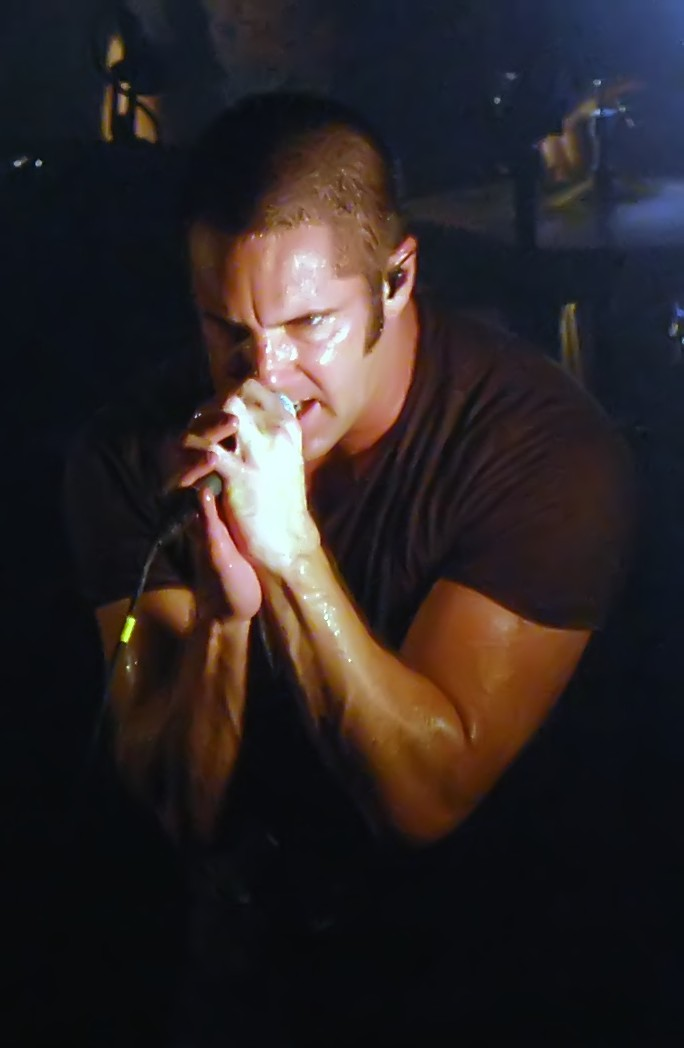
Trent Reznor, the lead vocalist of Nine Inch Nails, gave permission for adaptations of their songs to be used in the episode.

Songs performed by Ashley in the episode are adaptations of songs from Nine Inch Nails: "Head Like a Hole" was retitled "On a Roll", and "Right Where It Belongs" was changed to "Right Where I Belong". A rewrite of "Hurt" to "Flirt" was made but not included in the episode. "On a Roll" was released via YouTube on 13 June 2019 and added to various music streaming services on 14 June. It subsequently charted in several countries, including peak positions of 18 in New Zealand and 65 in the UK. Billboard ranked the song 28th in their list of the 100 Best Songs of 2019.

During the writing process, Brooker contacted Trent Reznor, the lead vocalist and songwriter for Nine Inch Nails, with a synopsis outline and an explanation that he wanted to adapt their music into pop songs. Reznor—whose songwriting partner Atticus Ross produced the soundtrack to the series four episode "Crocodile"—was a fan of the show and approved. Brooker said that the humour arises from the fact that the pop versions are "insanely positive" and "full of empty affirmations". As an example, "On a Roll" changes the original lyrics "Bow down before the one you serve" to "I'm stoked on ambition and verve". Reznor said that the songs were "wonderfully absurd" and "really funny" in context. He found it "strange to hear [his] music come through the blender and back". Isobel Waller-Bridge, sister of the actor and writer Phoebe Waller-Bridge, received a credit for adapting the episode's music.

== Analysis ==
Adi Robertson of The Verge wrote that "Rachel, Jack and Ashley Too" is an "uncharacteristically upbeat story about subverting sinister tech toward good ends and combining a critique of celebrity fandom with a thought experiment about brain uploading". Tim Brinkhof of The New York Observer said that Black Mirror serves "to expose the lies and hypocrisies of society", in this case "conflict between the artistic integrity of the artist and the financial interest of their producers". Dan Stubbs of NME suggested that the title is a pun on Rita, Sue and Bob Too (1986), a film about two teenage girls who have a sexual relationship with a married man. Some critics noted a change in tone around halfway through the episode, with The Independent's Alexandra Pollard calling the latter half a "fun, high-concept heist film" and Stubbs describing it as "an adult take on the 1980s, kids' adventure caper, complete with gags [and] a goofy chase".

"Rachel, Jack and Ashley Too" explores a number of themes that other Black Mirror episodes focus on, such as AI, storage of human memories, and drugs. Stubbs said that it was "not so much science fiction as science fact", because technologies already exist to facilitate hologram performances and production of new music using an artist's voice and image without their consent. Robertson viewed it as "mostly allegorical", and employing technological tropes "to raise questions about human agency". Writing in Vox, Alissa Wilkinson found that it asks: "What images are celebrities allowed to project? And what do their fans receive in return?" Troy Patterson commented in The New Yorker that the episode criticises "people who tell kids to have faith in themselves because it suits their own cynical purposes", but nonetheless does "want kids to believe in themselves".

The episode makes small Easter egg references to past works by Brooker. In Catherine's office, a cover of the magazine SugarApe, from the 2005 sitcom Nathan Barley, can be seen. Ashley O sings "Anyone Who Knows What Love Is (Will Understand)" by Irma Thomas, a song which appeared in four previous Black Mirror episodes, first in "Fifteen Million Merits". A news programme references Sea of Tranquility, a fictional franchise mentioned in "The National Anthem" and "Nosedive", along with a number of events from other episodes. Rachel's high school is named after Colin Ritman, a Bandersnatch character, and Ashley O is treated at St. Juniper's hospital, which appears in "Black Museum", where it was in turn a reference to "San Junipero". Catherine can be seen using the Smithereen app from "Smithereens"; conversely, in "Smithereens", #AshleyOWembley is a trending topic.

=== Characterisation ===
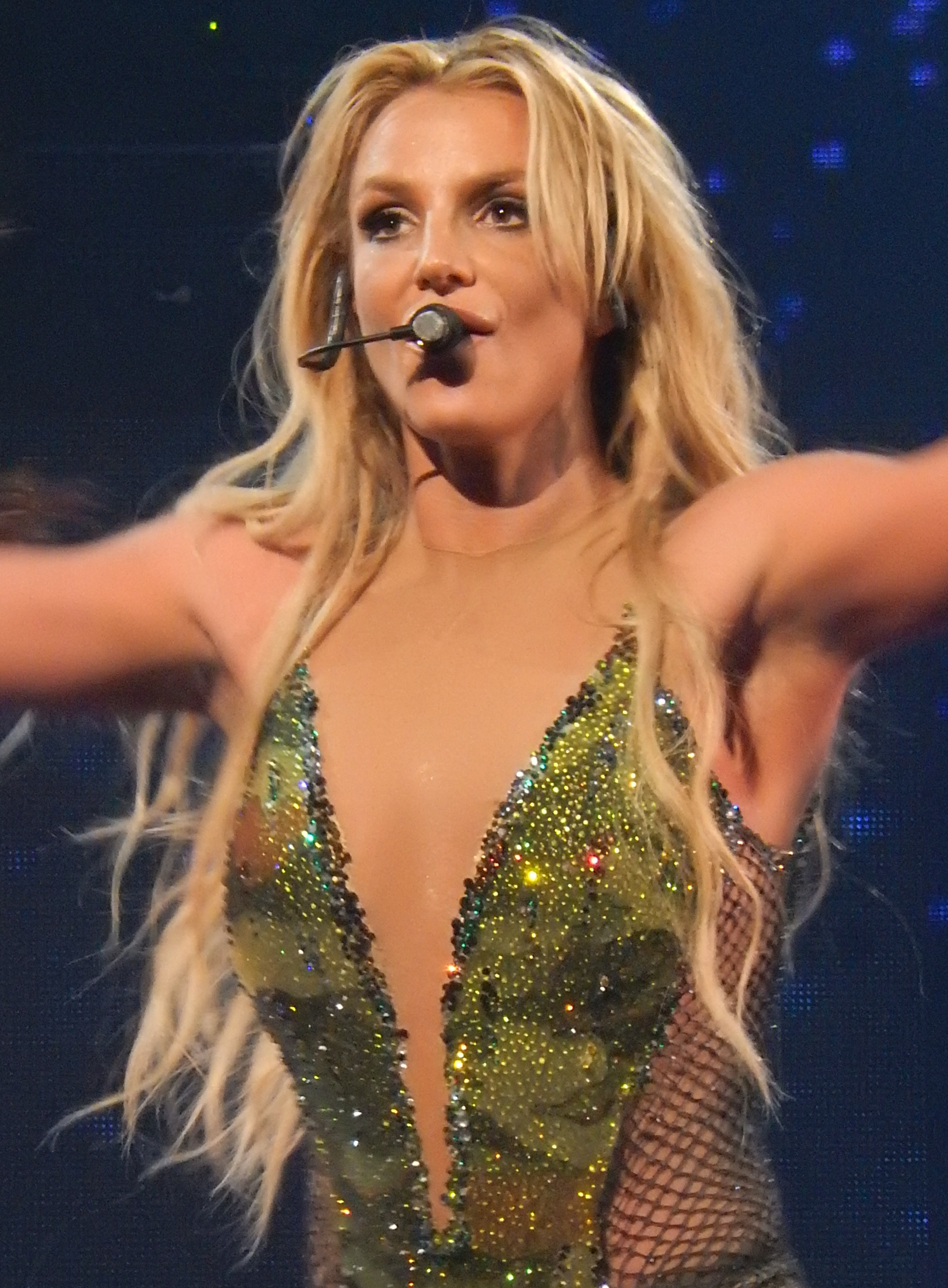
The episode's storyline was compared to allegations that Britney Spears was forced to perform against her will during her legal conservatorship.

Many critics compared Cyrus's real life to the experiences of Ashley O. She is a singer-songwriter who garnered fame as the protagonist of the Disney Channel teen sitcom Hannah Montana (2006–2011). Similarly, Ashley O is a "peppy, cookie-cutter pop star", according to Kelly Lawler of USA Today. Brinkhof found the episode a "sharp critique on the ethics of stardom" that "eerily mirrors" Cyrus's "escape from her confining role" on Hannah Montana. He said that "to what extent she has become the master of her own destiny or has remained caught up in the economic machinery remains uncertain".

Earlier in 2019, Cyrus had mentioned "Free Britney" during a performance, in reference to allegations that Britney Spears was being subjected to abuse through her then-ongoing conservatorship. Adam White of The Telegraph noted the connection between the allegations and the narrative of "Rachel, Jack and Ashley Too". The similarities drew renewed media interest in June 2021 after Spears delivered testimony in a court hearing alleging excessive abuse and control through her conservatorship, including being forcibly hospitalized and medicated against her will as punishment for refusing to perform. Robertson compared "Rachel, Jack and Ashley Too" to the same subject, as well as legal disputes between the singer Kesha and her former producer Dr. Luke. According to Stubbs, Catherine "views a vulnerable dependant as a product" and is in this way comparable to Murry Wilson and Joe Jackson.

Critics commented on how the death of Rachel and Jack's mother affected the children. David Sims of The Atlantic said that both children experience depression, "with Rachel retreating into herself ... while Jack lashes out against the world". Robertson thought the start of the episode "offers a fittingly melancholic portrait of someone using an imaginary relationship to handle loss and anxiety". Patterson wrote: "Where Ashley O is a kind of Pinocchio dreaming of becoming a real girl, Rachel and Jack Goggins are two sisters awaiting their discovery as princesses". He said the lack of a maternal figure "abets its qualities as a fairy tale". In order to "cope with lonely teenage hell", Robertson said that Rachel does "idol worship" of Ashley O. This connection draws on "the increasingly reciprocal relationship between celebrities and their fans." The Ashley Too doll was compared variously to the robotic toy Furby, the virtual assistant Amazon Alexa and the fictional virtual assistant Samantha from Her (2013). In contrast with an episode of The Simpsons on a similar topic, "Lisa vs. Malibu Stacy" (1994), Rachel is not critical of her doll.

Wilkinson compared Rachel to Kayla, the protagonist of the comedy-drama film Eighth Grade (2018). Kayla is a young girl who films little-viewed YouTube videos about positivity. Wilkinson said that the documentary Jawline (2019) demonstrates "an eventual cost to the producers of that kind of relentless optimism, especially when the teenage content creators can't keep it up because things at home actually aren't all that great": this is similar to Ashley O's unhappy private life. Wilkinson wrote that "Rachel, Jack and Ashley Too" shows "repercussions for the audience too", as a person views themselves as a failure for being unhappy. She asks: "is it the celebrity performance packaging industry itself that's at fault? Or is it the creators? Or the fans?" On the same note, Zack Handlen of The A.V. Club commented that "'empowerment' has become a brand, with generic messages of confidence and believe-in-yourself churned out for an audience desperate to hear any assurance that there might be some way out of their misery".

== Reception ==
The episode holds a 51% rating on Rotten Tomatoes, based on 41 critics, indicating mixed reviews. Its critics' consensus summarises that it "struggles to sew its many concepts together", and the most major strength is Cyrus's "wholly committed and compelling performance". It received ratings of three out of five stars in The Telegraph and The Independent, and two stars from the BBC. It was rated 5.5 out of 10 in Paste and graded C+ in The A.V. Club. The critics Brinkhof, Patterson and Sims thought it was the best episode of series five, while Paste's Jim Vorel and The Guardian's Stuart Heritage found it the worst, with Heritage adding that it was one of the worst episodes of Black Mirror overall.

Hugh Montgomery, writing in the BBC, criticised the episode as Black Mirror "at its most crudely parabolic". The Hollywood Reporter's Tim Goodman characterised it as an unintentional "Disney movie spoof" due to its "ridiculous plot and obvious writing". Robertson and Daniel D'Addario of Variety believed it was worse than most Black Mirror episodes, with Robertson finding it a "corny, scattershot installment of a show that's usually revered for its sharp cynicism", and D'Addario calling it "the most majestically wrongheaded" episode of Black Mirror and of "prestige television" in the latest year. However, Sims found it an "intermittently fascinating bit of pop-music melodrama", albeit "bizarre", and Heritage approved that it was not "pointlessly bleak for the sake of it".

Some critics said the episode contained interesting ideas, but that these were insufficiently explored. Brinkhof pointed to "Be Right Back" and "White Christmas" as past episodes that examined themes of cloning and AI more deeply, and wrote that fans "lamented" the episode "for its untapped potential". D'Addario said that the episode "has about fifteen potentially fruitful topics on its mind" but fails to find a good continuation from the premise. An example interesting topic is "women in music presenting a show of empowerment while being financially and creatively under someone else's control". D'Addario pointed to the "fundamental unseriousness of tone" as a reason the episode does not properly explore its themes. White found "fascinating ideas sketched here and there", but a reliance on "vaguely banal statements on the vapidity of pop and the lack of care afforded to some of its most profitable stars". Dissenting, Sims argued that "Brooker does a solid job interpolating" between "three big ideas", where "no single theme gets to dominate or develop fully".

Patterson wrote that the show was "sharpest in its revisionist considerations of genre", and approved that the episode "tinkers with the tropes of tween tales and talks back to the genre in its own voice and on its own terms". Sims thought the Ashley Too doll's consciousness was the "most compelling" idea, though it "arrives late in a muddled tale" as a "third-act plot twist", and Robertson saw "huge untapped potential" in having Rachel choose between the real Ashley O and the "perfect, locked-down" Ashley Too, or exploring the identity conflict between Ashley O and Ashley Too. Handlen asks why Ashley O's consciousness would be uploaded into the doll when it does not "do anything that much more complicated than empty pleasantries and soundbites". In contrast, Den of Geek's Rob Leane found it "brilliantly designed" and funny. Chelsea Steiner of The Mary Sue said that the episode "offers nothing new or nuanced" in its "poking fun at vapid pop music", a topic well-explored by other works. Heritage listed A Star Is Born (2018), Vox Lux (2018) and Yesterday as recent works that also addressed how "young creatives are at the mercy of their morally bankrupt handlers".

Reviewers were largely disappointed by the writing and structure. Pollard summarised that: "Plot points are picked up and dropped; narrative arcs lead to nowhere; unnecessary characters abound". A change in tone midway through was widely commented on, with Handlen writing that "we don't actually get to the plot till about the forty minute mark". According to Handlen, it starts as a "low-key family drama" and becomes a "kid's adventure film". Robertson found that after "a promising start", the storyline "becomes simultaneously overstuffed and underveloped", omitting "the intimate details that make its early scenes so compelling". Montgomery analysed the latter half as a "hokey-teen-sci-fi-adventure" that is "increasingly ludicrous and puerile" and Robertson said that episode was "at its blandest during some deeply unnecessary action sequences". Vorel criticised "clear-cut heroes and villains" with "paper-thin degrees of depth", and Sims believed the villains to be "particularly overwrought" as the episode does not explore their motivations. However, Leane praised that "an array of toe-tapping tunes ... really assist the episode in making this pop icon feel real".

The ending received mixed commentary, as did some individual scenes. It was described as "gratifying" by Patterson, "a really triumphant payoff" by Leane and a "fantastic surprise" that subverted "the trademark nihilism" by White. However, Sims accused the episode of being "more interested in providing a neat ending than in delving into the deep questions it stirs up", and Brinkhof reported that some fans "accuse its feel-good ending of being a symptom of the infamously bleak show losing its uncompromisingly sinister edge". Leane reviewed that the mouse trap concept "feels like filler", though its payoff was "quite funny". Sims praised one particular scene, wherein Ashley O's comatose musical ideas are turned into pop music, as "a classic piece of grim Black Mirror humor".

Cyrus received acclaim for her portrayal of Ashley O and Ashley Too. Lawler said that "Cyrus is essentially playing herself ... and she does it well". Goodman said she was "one of the few actresses and singers who could even make this work". Pollard analysed that Cyrus was most impressive at playing the "two extremes" of her character's emotions: "desperate and broken" on one end and "uninhibited and defiant" on the other. Montgomery found her early "subdued, spectral performance" as Ashley O to be the best part of the episode. Leane and Sims both enjoyed her voice acting as Ashley Too, with Leane calling it a "tour-de-force performance" and Sims finding her "especially charming" in the role. However, Robertson preferred her as Ashley O, writing that Ashley Too is a "generic robot sidekick". In contrast, Vorel criticised the characterisation of both versions, saying that the idea "could have come straight from Cyrus' own marketing team, in a meta-attempt to prove that Miley Cryus The Performer is a being of depth and nuance". Heritage saw writing problems in Ashley O's later dialogue, saying that she "stops sounding like Miley Cyrus and starts sounding like a 48-year-old man trying to sound like Miley Cyrus".

Other characters received less praise. Vorel found Rachel to be so "hopelessly naive" that the viewer "can't reasonably be expected to identify with or even empathize with her". Handlen crticised that Rachel "is basically forgotten once the story kicks in", while Vorel said that Jack "rarely amounts to more than a sounding board for Rachel's insecurities". Steiner wrote that the episode fails to understand teenage girls and criticised an overall lack of "an authentic voice for any of the leads", suggesting that having a woman writer may have averted this problem. Leane experienced a "minor letdown" in the lack of "emotional punch" in scenes showing Rachel and Jack with their father. However, he praised that "the core characters all get their chance to shine in a musical number".

=== Episode rankings ===
"Rachel, Jack and Ashley Too" ranked as follows on critics' lists of the 23 instalments of Black Mirror, from best to worst:

- 9th – Matt Miller, Esquire
- 14th – Ed Power, The Telegraph
- 15th – Aubrey Page, Collider
- 17th – James Hibberd, Entertainment Weekly
- 18th – Charles Bramesco, Vulture
- 18th – Tim Molloy, TheWrap
- 22nd – Morgan Jeffery and Rosie Fletcher, Digital Spy
- 23rd – Travis Clark, Business Insider

IndieWire authors ranked the 22 Black Mirror instalments excluding Bandersnatch by quality, giving "Rachel, Jack and Ashley Too" a position of 16th. Instead of by quality, Proma Khosla of Mashable ranked the episodes by tone, concluding that "Rachel, Jack and Ashley Too" was the fourth-least pessimistic episode of the show.

=== Awards ===
In 2020, "On a Roll" received a nomination for a Guild of Music Supervisors Award in the category Song Written and/or Recorded for Television, with Trent Reznor as the songwriter, Miley Cyrus as the artist and Amelia Hartley as music supervisor.
