= Equal Standard =

Crime film by Brendan Kyle Cochrane

- Directed by: Brendan Kyle Cochrane
- Written by: Taheim Bryan
- Produced by: Taheim Bryan; Brendan Kyle Cochrane; Treach; Jen Emma Hertel; Rob Simmons
- Starring: Ice-T; Maurice Benard; Tobias Truvillion; Syleena Johnson; Robert Clohessy; Chris Kerson; Jules Willcox
- Cinematography: Snyder Derival
- Edited by: Pete Talamo
- Music by: Ben B. Goss
- Production companies: First Born Production; Digital Seven
- Distributed by: Mutiny Pictures
- Release date: May 14, 2020
- Running time: 111 minutes
- Country: United States
- Language: English
- Box office: $15,938

Equal Standard is a 2020 American crime drama film written by Taheim Bryan and directed by Brendan Kyle Cochrane. The film stars Ice-T, Maurice Benard, Tobias Truvillion, Syleena Johnson, Robert Clohessy, Chris Kerson and Jules Willcox. The film follows New York City Detective Chris Jones (Tobias Truvillion), who gets shot by a white detective, returns fire and kills him.

The film was released in selected theatres on May 7, 2021, by Mutiny Pictures. Film writer Taheim Bryan was shot to death in New York City in August 2021 while sitting in his Mercedes-Benz.

== Cast ==
- Tobias Truvillion as Detective Chris Jones
- Syleena Johnson as Sergeant Jackie Jones
- Ice-T as Croft
- Maurice Benard as Captain Chavat Issak
- Robert Clohessy as Internal Affairs Detective Rullan
- Chris Kerson as Detective Kevin McKenzie
- Jules Willcox as Kathy McKenzie
- Fredro Starr as Du
- Hassan Johnson as Justice
- Marc John Jefferies as Kenny Williamson
- Jermaine Hopkins as Jermaine
- Anthony 'Treach' Criss as Trigger
- Myles Clohessy as Officer Mitchell
- James Doherty as Officer Jacobs
- Gabriella Sophia Terrero as Kimberly Rullan
- Jermel Howard as Mel
- Kresh Novakovic as Officer Parmeto
- Sal Rendino as Jim Hannigan
- Hilary Barraford as Katie Mitchell
- Josh Berresford as Detective Jack Mullen
- Bill Weeden as Mr. Gorka
- Darlene Dues as Michael's Mother
- Brad Fleischer as Josh McKenzie
- Gerard Cordero as Detective Jean Rivera
- Vincent Minutella as Internal Affairs Detective Jerry Rifkin
- Hwalan Shub as Detective Kate Summers
- Ameerah Briggs as Ashley Williamson
- Reggie Talley as Michael Williamson
- Audrey Labarthe as Detective Susan Rosette

== Reception ==
Film critic Tomris Laffly from Variety gave it a mixed review writing: "Trying to be The Wire of the BLM era, Brendan Kyle Cochrane's haphazardly edited New York-based drama of shifting perspectives feels too unfocused and overstuffed for a feature." and same time praised Truvillion's performance writing: "Thankfully, Truvillion in one of the leading parts is an exception to this overarching shortcoming. As Chris, a good cop in a barrel of bad apples, he puts forth a performance that is in equal parts authentic and tender."

Sandie Angulo Chen from Common Sense Media gave it 3 of 5 stars writing: "Relevant themes and Truvillion's stand-out performance rescue this drama from preachy dialogue and oversimplification of the tensions between Black communities and law enforcement."

== See also ==
- List of hood films
