= Marc Menchaca =

American actor (born 1975)

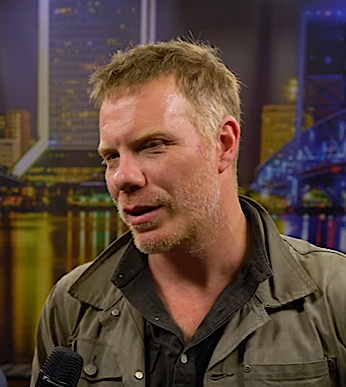
- Menchaca in 2019
- Born: October 10, 1975 (age 51); San Angelo, Texas, U.S.
- Occupations: Actor; writer; director
- Years active: 2001–present
- Spouse: Lena Headey (m. 2022)

Marc Menchaca (born October 10, 1975) is an American actor, writer, and director. His credits include The Alamo (2004), Generation Kill (2008), Homeland (2011–2012), This Is Where We Live (2013), Ozark (2017–2018, 2022), The Sinner (2018), Manifest (2019), The Outsider (2019), Black Mirror: episode "Rachel, Jack and Ashley Too" (2019), Alone (2021), No One Gets Out Alive (2021), Jack Ryan (2022), White House Plumbers (2023), Beacon 23 (2023–2024), American Rust (2024), The Big Cigar (2024), Dexter: Resurrection (2025), Companion (2025), The Abandons (2025), and Dutton Ranch (2026).

== Early life and education ==
His father is Mexican and his mother is American. Menchaca first became interested in performing as a student at Central High School in San Angelo, Texas. After graduating, he attended Texas A&M University, earning a bachelor's degree in English; it was also where he acted in his first play. He attended a summer acting program at the Circle in the Square Theatre School in Manhattan before deciding to pursue an acting career in his twenties. He is an alumnus of the William Esper Studio.

== Career ==
Menchaca was co-director, co-writer and lead actor of the 2013 Heartland Film Festival movie This Is Where We Live.

In 2015, he played a lead role as Bob Stevens, a veteran struggling with memory loss, in the Kyle Ham-directed film Reparation. It earned him the best actor award at the Breckenridge Film Festival, with the film receiving a further 10 festival awards, including the Austin Film Festival ‘s Audience Choice prize and Best Film at the Santa Fe Film Festival.

In the 2018 Netflix television series Ozark, Menchaca had a recurring role as Russ Langmore, a man struggling to suppress his homosexuality. He has regular recent roles on television in The Sinner and Manifest. He appeared again on TV with Jason Bateman in 2019, in the Stephen King horror miniseries portraying Jack Hoskins in all 10 episodes of The Outsider (2019). The same year he starred alongside Miley Cyrus playing her father Kevin Goggins in the Black Mirror episode "Rachel, Jack and Ashley Too" (2019).

In 2020, he won Best Actor in a Feature at the Mammoth Film Festival Awards, for his performance as Sam in the John Hyams thriller Alone alongside co-star Jules Willcox. He performed his own stunts in the film, including a fight scene in mud with Willcox. He received a further award for Best Actor in 2020 at the Oxford International Film Festival (OXIFF) in the UK, for his portrayal of 'The Man' in the Sarah Pirozek directed film #Like

In 2021, he starred in the Santiago Menghini-directed Netflix horror movie No One Gets Out Alive with co-star Cristina Rodlo.

In 2025, Menchaca played Ronald "Red" Schmidt and The Dark Passenger in Dexter: Resurrection. He was Sheriff Hayworth, working in the same cast as his wife Lena Headey, also Gillian Anderson in the western series The Abandons.

== Personal life ==
On October 6, 2022, Menchaca married British actress Lena Headey in Apulia, Italy.

== Filmography ==
=== Film ===
| Year | Title | Role | Notes/ref. |
|---|---|---|---|
| 2002 | Pageant | Officer Paddy | |
| 2003 | Screen Door Jesus | Little Red | |
| 2004 | No Pain, No Gain | University Cop | |
| 2004 | The Alamo | Fifer | |
| 2009 | Last Day of Summer | Shipping Employee | |
| 2009 | Frame of Mind | Interrogator | |
| 2011 | A Long Road | Employer 1 | Short |
| 2011 | Bright | Taylor | Short |
| 2013 | This Is Where We Live | Noah | Actor, writer and director |
| 2013 | Reservoir | Adam Pierce | |
| 2014 | She's Lost Control | Johnny | |
| 2015 | Reparation | Bob Stevens | |
| 2016 | Ace the Case | Gunner | |
| 2017 | Where Is Kyra? | Vine | |
| 2017 | Weightless | Cody | |
| 2017 | Smartass | Rod | |
| 2019 | Every Time I Die | Jay | |
| 2020 | The Evening Hour | Everett | |
| 2020 | Upstream with Jimmy Dallas | Jimmy Dallas | Short |
| 2020 | Motherhood | Phillip | Short |
| 2020 | Alone | Sam Dillon | |
| 2021 | #Like | The Man | |
| 2021 | No One Gets Out Alive | Red | |
| 2021 | The Retaliators | Jed | |
| 2021 | Treat | Mike | |
| 2021 | Playing God | Vaughn | |
| 2022 | 9 Bullets | Sheriff John Carter | |
| 2022 | Sick | Jason | |
| 2023 | The Creator | Captain McBride | |
| 2025 | Companion | Deputy Hendrix | Cameo |
| 2025 | Dead of Winter | Camo Jacket | |
| 2026 | Unabomber | Eddie Turrell | |

=== Television ===
| Year | Title | Role | Notes/Ref. |
|---|---|---|---|
| 2001 | Arrest & Trial | Junior | Episode: "Texas Prison Break" |
| 2002 | Beyond the Prairie: The True Story of Laura Ingalls Wilder | Store Assistant | Television film |
| 2006 | Guiding Light | Business Guy 1 | Episode #1.14989 |
| 2008 | Generation Kill | Gunnery Sergeant Mike “Gunny” Wynn | 7 episodes |
| 2009 | Law & Order: Criminal Intent | N/A | Episode: "Family Values" |
| 2009 | CSI: NY | Leonard | Episode: "Manhattanhenge" |
| 2009 | CSI: Crime Scene Investigation | Hank Rinaldi | Episode: "Better Off Dead" |
| 2009–2010 | FlashForward | Wheeler | 3 episodes |
| 2010 | True Blue | N/A | Television film |
| 2011 | Treme | James Distel | Episode: "On Your Way Down" |
| 2011 | The Glades | Michael Caldwell | Episode: "Addicted to Love" |
| 2011 | Black Jack | Corporal Pierce | Television film |
| 2012 | Person of Interest | Fox | Episode: "No Good Deed" |
| 2011–2012 | Homeland | Lauder Wakefield | 5 episodes |
| 2013 | Law & Order: Special Victims Unit | Officer Michael Groves | Episode: "Internal Affairs" |
| 2013–2015 | Inside Amy Schumer | Travis / Drew / Matt Forrester | 3 episodes |
| 2015 | The Blacklist | Pierce | 2 episodes |
| 2015 | Togetherness | Tex | Episode: "Houston, We Have a Problem" |
| 2015 | Sleepy Hollow | Colonel Sutton | Episode: "Tempus Fugit" |
| 2015 | Chicago P.D | Owen Kozelek | Episode: "Push the Pain Away" |
| 2015 | Blue Bloods | Marty Brock | Episode: "With Friends Like These" |
| 2016 | Elementary | Detective Ryan Dunning | Episode: "A View with a Room" |
| 2017 | The Son | Bigfoot Wallace | Episode: "Death Song" |
| 2017–2018, 2022 | Ozark | Russ Langmore | 11 episodes |
| 2018 | Random Acts of Flyness | Assistant Director | Episode: "I tried to tell my therapist about my dreams/MARTIN HAD A DREEEEAAAAM" |
| 2018 | MacGyver | Booth | Episode: "Wind + Water" |
| 2018 | The Sinner | Glen Fisher | 4 episodes |
| 2019 | WPT Deepstacks Jacksonville | himself | 1 episode |
| 2019 | Manifest | James Griffin | 3 episodes |
| 2019 | Raising Dion | Walter Mills | 2 episodes |
| 2019 | Black Mirror | Kevin Goggins | Episode: "Rachel, Jack and Ashley Too" |
| 2020 | The Outsider | Jack Hoskins | Miniseries, 10 episodes |
| 2021 | Curb Your Enthusiasm | Klansman Joe | Episode: "The Watermelon" |
| 2022 | Law & Order: Organized Crime | Brother Bill | Episode: "As Hubris Is to Oedipus" |
| 2022 | Jack Ryan | Captain Andrew Bennett | 2 episodes |
| 2023 | White House Plumbers | Carl Shoffler | Miniseries, 2 episodes |
| 2023–2024 | Beacon 23 | Keir | 5 episodes |
| 2024 | American Rust | Vic Walker | 7 episodes |
| 2024 | The Big Cigar | Sydney Clark | Miniseries, 5 episodes |
| 2025 | Dexter: Resurrection | Ronald "Red" Schmidt / The Dark Passenger | 3 episodes |
| 2025 | The Abandons | Sheriff Hayworth | 3 episodes |
| 2026 | Dutton Ranch | Zachariah | 9 episodes |
| 2026 | Life, Larry and the Pursuit of Unhappiness | Joseph Clanton | Episode: "Lincoln" |

=== Video games ===
| Year | Title | Role | Notes |
|---|---|---|---|
| 2003 | Freelancer | | |
| 2018 | Red Dead Redemption 2 | Del Lobos | |

== Awards and nominations ==
| Year | Award | Category | Nominated work | Result | Ref. |
|---|---|---|---|---|---|
| 2013 | South by Southwest (SXSW) Festival Awards | Best narrative Feature | This Is Where We Live | Nominated | |
| 2016 | Breckenridge Film Festival Awards | Best Actor | Reparation | Won | |
| 2020 | Mammoth Film Festival Awards | Best Actor in a Feature | Alone | Won | |
| 2020 | Oxford International Film Festival (OXIFF) | Best Actor | #Like | Won | |
