= List of Boston Public characters =

This site includes the list of all cast members that appeared on FOX drama series Boston Public.

== Main characters ==
=== Steven Harper ===
Steven Harper, played by Chi McBride, is the main protagonist of the series and the tough and level-headed principal with a heart of gold who constantly struggles with the hang-ups and problems of his employees and students, from Harry Senate's firing off a gun in his classroom to Milton Buttle's affair with a student in Season 1, and Danny Hanson and Marla Hendricks' bickering (and eventual fist-fighting) in Seasons 2 and 3. Throughout the series, Steven remained the most consistent character on the show, and its strongest presence and focal point. Considered one of the most important characters in the show, he was consistently the school's leader, handling teachers and students with problems; much of his character revolved around his pride in the teaching profession and his loyalty to the kids and the faculty.

Little is known about Steven's past, but there are suggestions that he was a rebellious youth during his teenage years. He mentions in one episode that he crashed a car into a tree while drunk, and reveals in another episode that, when he was 14, he and some friends robbed a convenience store, but when one of his teachers found out and didn't report him to the police, Steven began to turn his life around. This, years later, allowed Steven to admire, more or less, teachers who stopped at nothing to help their students. It is also mentioned that Steven played football in high school.

Steven was married to a woman named Louanna, but they divorced. During Season 2, Brooke, Steven's rebellious, liberal activist teenage daughter, gets transferred to Winslow High after being expelled from her private school when an animal rights protest goes wrong. Steven manages to build a relationship with Brooke and his estranged ex-wife, who later goes on to date another man. By the end of Season 3, Brooke had been written out of the series, as she had graduated and was accepted to Harvard University. Once the show's fourth and final season began, Steven embarked on a relationship with Marilyn Sudor, which caused some friction between him and Scott Guber, who had become attracted to Marylin.

Steven appeared in a 2005 episode of Boston Legal titled "Let Sales Ring", when a student sued Winslow High for censoring a news network (that was clearly Fox News Channel, though never explicitly identified as such). He also appeared on Boston Legal's parent show, The Practice.

=== Lauren Davis ===
Lauren Davis, played by Jessalyn Gilsig (Seasons 1–2), was one of the two social studies teachers in Season 1. She earned the nickname "The Nun" because of her strait-laced ways. By Season 2, when the ostensibly hipper Ronnie Cooke appeared, Lauren's character changed, making her what her colleagues called a "prima donna perfectionist." In Season 1, Steven felt that she was being racist because she was tougher on her African-American students, an accusation she was willing to consider in order to save Harvey from being fired.

Lauren briefly dated Harry, but broke up with him, in what was Season 1's biggest romance. Later, she began dating Daniel Evans, an alumnus who was found to be a stalker. She carried a gun to protect herself and was suspended for a summer session.

During Season 2, Lauren was shocked when some of her students were hospitalized because they were so stressed out about her work assignments. Scott had a crush on Lauren, a relationship that never seemed to go anywhere until right before Lauren was written out of the show.

When the third season premiered, Gilsig had left the show, and it was mentioned that Lauren had left Winslow High for a job at a private school.

=== Marla Hendricks ===
Marla Hendricks, played by Loretta Devine, was a social studies teacher who suffered from severe bipolar manic depression, the effects of which were mainly only seen in Season 1. She had to take pills to make it through a stressful day, which seemed to be just about every day.

Marla was occasionally depicted as a vocally religious woman, encouraging students to pray on school grounds and running a gospel choir. She was also frequently the one to give lectures to other faculty members, parents or students about the financial and emotional challenges facing teachers, along with other topical issues such as bullying, multiculturalism, and the usage of the word "nigger/nigga" by white people, and has shown to be a full believer of extreme methods, such as Senate bringing a gun and using it to threaten students in hopes they stay quiet.

On the other hand, on many occasions, Marla was depicted, like Danny and Harvey, as someone who did not think before she spoke. She was vocal and no-nonsense, and often insulted teachers, students and even Steven when they needed it, or sometimes just because she needed it. Scott once accused her of being too emotional on too many different issues to the point it diluted her potency as an advocate. Marla's bold personality kept her from advancing into administration when she insulted the concept of standardized testing during a job interview for vice principal. In Season 3, Marla had a brief relationship with a political advocate played by Vern Troyer.

In Season 4, Marla decided to have a baby, and asked Steven if he would consider donating his sperm. When Steven refused, she continued to try to get pregnant but failed, suffering a miscarriage, but later got the chance of experiencing motherhood when she took in a troubled student named Rainy.

Overall, Marla was considered an excellent and compassionate teacher, adept at reaching kids and parents. Like the other faculty members, her personal foibles sometimes got in her way, but she was, overall, there for the kids and her colleagues.

=== Scott Guber ===
Scott Guber, played by Anthony Heald, is vice principal who was forced to play the disciplinary "bad cop" to both the students and faculty. As someone who grew up bullied because his peers mistakenly thought he was gay, Scott treated bigotry and bullying as serious a crime as cutting class or cheating on an exam. On the other hand, some episodes had him seriously bullying teachers with a condescending, managerial tone that caused them to dislike him. In fact, the students saw him as so tough they labeled him "The Nazi" in spite of the fact that Scott is Jewish. However, Scott's dedication to Winslow High and its students was eventually noted in the first-season finale when the kids gave him a special award.

It is strongly indicated that Scott's father died several years ago; his single mother, Miriam, appears in Season 3 and goes out on a date with Harvey. Scott also has an older brother named George, who is a high-priced lawyer; he became estranged from his brother when George set Scott up on a date with a masseuse who turned out to be a call girl.

Scott's ongoing goal was to one day become a principal himself, a goal he pursued in Season 1, which was also devoted to his growing dislike for being the "bad guy" to Steven's "good guy." He was disappointed to receive an unfavorable recommendation from Steven, who said he wasn't ready and was too autocratic to be a principal. Over the next seasons, Scott and Steven would sometimes wrangle over the boundaries between their two jobs, but their friendship was key to the both of them and to the show.

Scott's love of classical music, composing and conducting was a staple of the character's off-duty time and occasionally allowed for storylines. His romantic life, unlike Steven's, was often fodder for storylines on the show. In Season 1, Scott pursued Lauren to the point she called it harassment, and later asked Marilyn Sudor out, leaving Lauren and Marilyn to conclude that he asked out any woman who was nice to him. This tendency came to a head in Season 2 when Scott began an ill-advised relationship with the duplicitous Meredith Peters who, in Season 1, locked her son Jeremy in the basement. Jeremy returned the favor, and she escaped only by chainsaw, severing her hand in the process and gaining the nickname "Hook Lady." The relationship was filled with ups and downs. Scott's attempts to get on Jeremy's good side were occasionally chronicled, including his sensitivity to Jeremy's bisexuality. Both characters basically disappeared after Scott separated from the erratic and pathological Meredith late in Season 2.

At the end of Season 2, Scott took up with Lauren, but as she didn't come back for Season 3, we never learned how that relationship ended. By the end of Season 3, however, Scott had increased his level of friendship with Marilyn through dancing lessons, and by Season 4, he was pursuing her. Marilyn rejected his advances, as she was seeing Steven. Weeks later, Scott found love in Violet Montgomery, a former adult film actress turned free spirit who shared his taste in music and agreed to date him exclusively.

=== Marilyn Sudor ===
Marilyn Sudor, played by Sharon Leal, was the music instructor and an English teacher. One of the most attractive teachers in the school, Marilyn was often listed as the teacher the "boys most wanted to sleep with" in a yearly student poll.

Student storylines had her involved with Tyronn Anderson (a gang member whom Harry was covering for), Jeremy Peters (who was being locked in the basement by his mother), and Aisha (a young talented singer who needed to break up with her abusive boyfriend). Marilyn admitted in Season 3 that she too had been in an abusive relationship with an ex-husband who showed up for an annulment in Season 4.

Romantically, Marilyn joined with Scott to take some dancing lessons, but was quick to assert that they were going to just be friends. She dated a basketball coach who turned out to be in coaching to advance his college coaching chances. In the final season, she began dating Steven, and their romance became public after a student faced suspension for kissing Marilyn at a scholarship awards ceremony threatened to go before the school board because he felt that he was suspended for kissing the principal's girlfriend; eventually, Steven agreed to reduce the student's punishment so that it would not cause him to lose his scholarship or hurt his college application process.

Marilyn was also involved in many of the musical numbers the show employed, singing at school concerts, doing a singing trio with Louisa and Marla, and working with young musicians. She was known for being by-the-book, compassionate, and straightforward, but also rather enigmatic and sort of a utility player a lot of the time.

=== Harvey Lipschultz ===
Harvey Lipschultz, played by Fyvush Finkel, was a history teacher. Harvey was a somewhat stereotypical elderly Jewish man. He was not a fan of political correctness, and his character seemed to switch from being a well-meaning old man that once met with the school's football team to ask them not to discriminate against a player who was rumored to be gay, while other times he came off as an Archie Bunker-type bigot or a simple comical buffoon of a bygone era.

As a young man, Harvey served in World War II. On the night before he left to go to Europe, he had a one-night stand with an African-American "lady of the evening" who later gave birth to a son named Lester who, at the age of sixty, was able to track down Harvey and introduce him to his family, including Lester's children and grandchildren. After the war, Harvey came home and married a woman named Helen, and remained faithful to her until she died, although she did have an affair. He frequently reflected back on Helen, who died shortly before the series began. In Season 3, a stock dip erased Harvey's life savings.

Often threatening to retire and also threatened with being fired, Harvey was able to continue working after he agreed to attend racial sensitivity classes in Season 1, and in Season 3, was barely saved from retirement by some last-minute budget restructuring.

=== Ronnie Cooke ===
Ronnie Cooke, played by Jeri Ryan (Seasons 2–4), was a college friend of Harry's, a successful and wealthy corporate lawyer who decided that her true calling in life was to teach at a public high school. As a lawyer, Ronnie often acted as a legal advocate for students in what some argued were completely unrealistic and "off-topic" situations. She handled at least two murder-related trials (one for Steven, one for some students). Other times, the stories fit the school: One of her first actions as a teacher was to help Danny organize his students to sue Harvey for emotional abuse, and also helped students get out of various legal jams.

Ronnie briefly dated Harry until he left the show early in Season 3. She then began an on-and-off relationship with Zach Fischer, and accepted a position from Dave Fields, the mayor's liaison, to be Winslow High's new assistant principal after she impressed the school board with her testing techniques. This made Marla, the other candidate for the job, jealous, and angered Scott, who saw Ronnie as a glory-hound putting her own political interests above the needs of the students. Zach became jealous of the mayor's liaison, who clearly liked Ronnie. Eventually, Ronnie and Scott came to an understanding, and were able to avoid budget cuts by cutting all funding on varsity sports. Marla moved on, and Zach became a Buddhist. By Season 4, Ronnie has stepped down from her position as vice principal and became the school guidance counselor.

=== Danny Hanson ===
Daniel 'Danny' Hanson, played by Michael Rapaport (Seasons 2–4), was some kind of humanities teacher who was introduced at the beginning of Season 2. He came from a working-class Irish-Catholic home, and had a populist political philosophy and a certain ambivalence about religion, declaring he didn't believe in God during the fourth season. This was due to him being sexually molested by his priest, Father Bill Egan, when he was a child. Danny also had a conservative side when it came to race, and didn't like the "sacred cow" status some racial issues were given. Later in Season 2, he began a debate about the word "nigger" in Winslow High. Marla correctly suggested that Danny's main flaw wasn't being controversial, but raising questions that he didn't have any helpful solutions to. Danny and Marla fought a lot (including one fist-fight early in Season 3), but also admitted they had a lot in common.

Like Marla, Danny's hot-headed attitude got him into trouble in both his professional and personal life. To name a few examples, when he walked in on his fiancé having sex with another man, Danny threw a phone at the man. Later, he sent letters to the parents of overweight students advising them to watch their children's junk food intake over the summer; one of the students punched him for that.

On the upside, Danny helped students with various issues, including a kid who had been molested by the same priest who hurt Danny, and a 12-year-old genius. He also had a special relationship with overachieving Debbie Nixon in Season 2, which came under scrutiny but turned out to be a healthy teacher/student mentorship.

In the series' third season, Danny began dating Claire Ellison, whom he eventually married, and gained custody of Allison, his 5-year-old niece, while Joanie, his sister, was in rehab for drug addiction. By Season 4, the marriage was faltering, and Joanie came back for Allison (which is rather legally dubious as they had legally adopted her). The series left Danny and Claire willing to work on their marriage while Allison went to live with her mom.

=== Harry Senate ===
Harry Senate, played by Nicky Katt (episodes 1-49), was perhaps the most popular of Boston Public's characters. A geology teacher who was assigned to teach in the infamous "Dungeon" after Marla walks out on the class in the pilot episode when dealing with the disruptive students there overwhelmed her, Harry specialized in using his own dark side to reach kids on the edge.

Possessed of a twisted sense of humor, Harry was infamous for deploying unusual (and often dangerous) methods to try and reach his students, such as firing a gun off in the Dungeon in an effort to teach the unruly students there a lesson in respect (something Marla approved of), agreeing to become the faculty sponsor for a student branch of the National Rifle Association only to later deliver a disparaging speech against the organization (which he linked to an American glorification of gun violence), and starting up a "Suicide Club" to get kids to open up about their suicidal feelings.

In an early Season 1 storyline, Harry was kissed by a student, Dana Poole, who later blackmailed him. He almost lost his job for this and his other radical antics, one being withholding knowledge that a student, Tyronn Anderson, had killed a rival gang member in self-defense. However, Harry's great compassion and ability to persuade his students to never give up and do the right thing ultimately saved his job, though he continued to come into conflict with Scott and Steven over his controversial methods.

Harry began a relationship with Lauren. The two initially seemed happy until Lauren began to feel that Harry wasn't really opening up to her; they subsequently broke up shortly after Harry confided in Lauren that he knew Tyronn killed someone. Harry's more serious relationship was with Ronnie Cooke in Seasons 2 and 3. Ronnie had initially been brought in by Harry to talk about her job as a big-time lawyer, but she was so impressed by Harry's handling of students that she signed up as a teacher.

In the second-season finale, Harry was stabbed by a former student and almost died. It took the near-death of Harry Senate for the rest of the faculty to realize how much they had come to love Harry as more than a colleague, but also as a close friend. Initially, Harry was supposed to die from his wounds; this was David E. Kelley's way of writing Nicky Katt out of the show so that he could pursue a movie career. When Katt became available again, but for only a part of the next season, Kelley and his writers allowed Harry to survive the attack, only to suffer from a slow mental breakdown that would ultimately provide Katt with a very different exit from the show.

A combination of post-traumatic stress (as a result of the stabbing) and his inability to "save" some of his most troubled students prompted Harry's breakdown as he displayed increasingly unpredictable behavior, such as taking off for Florida on an unapproved leave of absence, harboring a teenage prostitute and her young son, yelling at his students for not completing their homework, and getting rough with Ronnie while making love with her. Given the choice of being fired or taking a sabbatical, Harry was dismayed, but realized that his current mental state was affecting his unique ability as a teacher. He chose to take a leave of absence to get himself together, promising that he would someday return. As he walked out of the building, Harry gave newly arrived teacher Kimberly Woods some good advice.

Kelley admitted that Harry's choice to take a leave of absence was a way of allowing for his eventual return should Katt become available again; the show's premature cancellation prevented the possibility.

== Minor characters ==
=== Other teachers ===
In the third season, three new teachers were hired. The first two were Zach Fischer (Jon Abrahams) and Colin Flynn (Joey McIntyre). Zach seemed to be a replacement for Harry, except with no mysterious personal demons. He didn't deal with the same on-edge kids, but was very well liked by students who dubbed him "Fish." He soon began to date Ronnie until they broke up and he became a Buddhist (despite being Jewish). Colin had a brief affair with Patricia Emerson, the mother of Becky Emerson (who had a crush on him herself), but broke it off when a jealous Becky threatened to reveal the affair in a poem she was going to read in public.

The third character was Kimberly Woods (Michelle Monaghan), a young and somewhat naive woman in a "Teach for America" program whose class discussion on affirmative action results in racial violence that ended up putting Steven on trial for murder. Kimberly was later forced to leave Winslow High after an obsessed lesbian student stalked and threatened to kill her. Zach and Colin disappeared from the show after the third season with no explanation as to what happened to them.

In the fourth and final season, three new characters came onto the show. The first was Carmen Torres (Natalia Baron), a 21-year-old Spanish-fluent physics teacher who would clash with Steven over his insistence that she not speak and teach Spanish in the classroom. (The storyline never brought up the controversial reality that Massachusetts schools have a state-mandated English-only policy.) Carmen started a brief relationship with Jake (Milo Ventimiglia), an undercover cop who was posing as a "bad boy" teenager in order to bring down a student who was selling drugs; Jake was murdered when the drug bust went wrong. In the meantime, she helped Jenn Cardell (Lyndsy Fonseca), a student who also liked Jake and had a drinking problem. Carmen revealed her own drinking problem, but little was made of it. She also revealed her mother committed suicide. Carmen disappears in the middle of the final season with no explanation.

=== Other faculty members ===
There were some minor faculty members that served to comment on the current administration and teacher techniques and status.

- Louisa Fenn (Rashida Jones) was the wisecracking and sassy high school secretary who briefly dated Milton Buttle until he broke up with her after meeting Lisa Grier. Louisa learned of Milton's affair with Lisa and pondered ratting on him, but didn't; however, she did exhibit a spiteful attitude towards Lisa. In the second season, she was discovered to be secretly writing "Dear Helen", a sex advice column for the school newspaper, which almost led to her dismissal. Louisa came from a biracial family (her father was African-American while her mother was Caucasian). Before departing from the series, she started up an unofficial girl band with Marla and Marilyn.
- Milton Buttle (Joey Slotnick) was the nerdy and mild-mannered English teacher who was often on the receiving end of Sheryl Holt's online parodies. He met Lisa Grier at a Starbucks one day and started a relationship with her, only to find that she was a student at Winslow High. Despite this, he reluctantly continued his relationship with Lisa but was discovered and fired, though he continued dating Lisa. Her parents actually approved of their relationship.
- Kevin Riley (Tom McCarthy) was the football coach who was fired when he told Scott that he knew that about the secret affair between Milton and Lisa in an attempt to get Scott and Steven to go easy on Milton. Kevin sued to get his job back in an episode that crossed over with The Practice, but he lost his case and angrily snubbed Steven when he attempted to make peace with Kevin. The coach that replaced Kevin was a minor character who was rarely seen.
- Dr. Benjamin Harris (Leslie Jordan) was an effeminate Southern chemistry teacher who originated in the Ally McBeal episode "The Wedding." He first appeared when he helped Jeremy Peters dissect his mother's severed hand in the second-season premiere, then got into trouble when he organized a school production of Susan Miller's It's Our Town Too that centered around homosexuality. Dr. Harris later resigned after he was discovered having had cybersex with two 18-year-old female Winslow students who had posed as college students in an Internet chatroom.
- Marsha Shinn (Debbi Morgan) was the judgmental and overly critical superintendent who once visited the school to complain about the unorthodox teaching methods of the faculty in an attempt to get Steven fired after he physically assaulted a school bully in the pilot episode. Louisa called her "The Dragon Lady." She apparently quit her job since a new superintendent showed up at the school in later episodes.
- Bob 'Big Boy' Lick (Dwight "Heavy D" Myers) was the school's heavyset but compassionate counselor whom most students did not seem to like or trust, but both Steven and Scott often referred students over to him. He took a sabbatical during the final season without advising the administration and never returned.
- Elizabeth Vasquez (Elizabeth Peña) (presumably) replaced Marsha Shinn as the superintendent of schools. Unlike Shinn, she was less judgmental, and was persuaded by Steven to not suspend or fire Scott for his role in the student riot in the third-season premiere; she even half-jokingly told Steven to keep Scott from talking to the athletes. However, Vasquez was fired in the middle of the third season.

=== Minor characters and students ===
Minor characters in the series were primarily (but not always) students who were introduced to make a comment on society in general.

- Dana Poole (Sarah Thompson) was a popular student who kissed Harry, then tried to blackmail him. Despite this, Harry reached out to her and tried to help her when she became a stripper. As a college student, Dana returned to interview the high school faculty and staff about the low teacher salaries and began to date Harry, only to later break up with him at his birthday party because he lied to his co-workers about how long their relationship had been going on.
- Lisa Grier (Bianca Kajlich) was a senior who got into a romantic affair with the English teacher Milton Buttle. This resulted in Buttle's dismissal and her getting scheduled for transfer to another school. Lisa also taught a Shakespeare class after the teacher of the class gave up teaching, and was allowed to continue due to a shortage of teachers in the aftermath of Kevin Riley's dismissal. She eventually didn't get transferred and graduated at the end of the first season.
- Susan Potter (Joanna Garcia) was a popular student who was caught giving oral sex in the school hallway to sway a student election.
- Sheryl Holt (Lamya Jezek) was the editor of the student newspaper and webmaster of an online website, Holt 45. The website was a frequent problem for the faculty, as it often spoofed them and their private lives with graphic innuendos. Though usually a source of stress and conflict for the staff, Sheryl was sometimes sought out for information. The school eventually took her to court for the humiliating publishings on her website but lost the case. She was eventually set straight by Scott when he continually forced her to hire a lawyer for violating her rights of free speech, which was costing her family considerable amounts of money. Sheryl graduated along with the rest of her class in the Season 1 finale, and presented Scott with a special award.
- Christine Banks (Lindsay Hollister) was an unpopular and overweight girl who was often bullied and got into trouble when she responded to the harassment with violence. Kevin Riley persuaded her to earn respect from the students by being on the wrestling team, and it worked. However, Christine suffered a heart attack after a match, and later died.
- Brooke Harper (China Shavers) was Steven's headstrong daughter who was transferred to her father's high school after being kicked out of a private school for kidnapping the school's mascot as part of an animal rights protest. She continued her political activism, including organizing the students to stage a walkout over toxic chemicals and overcrowded classrooms in the school that ended up sparking a riot as the school athletes feared that these problems will be fixed by cutting the sports budget. Brooke once dated a 27-year-old man as well as Jeremy Peters, but neither relationship lasted long. She always hoped for her parents to get back together, but had accepted that it was not going to happen. At the end of the third season, Brooke had graduated and had been accepted to Harvard University.
- Meredith Peters (Kathy Baker) was Scott's girlfriend in Season 2 who was given a teaching position at Winslow High. She was always a little questionable; David E. Kelley apparently wanted the fans to always wonder if she was lying or not. Meredith was originally a recurring character in the later part of Season 1, and was suspected by Marilyn of abusing her son, Jeremy. It was later discovered that Meredith would often lock Jeremy in the basement as punishment. She mysteriously disappeared for a few episodes, during which time Jeremy's behavior was noticeably different. It was eventually revealed that Jeremy had locked her in the basement as retaliation against her punishments. Meredith returned in the first episode of Season 2 but without her right hand, which she'd accidentally severed in an attempt to escape from her bonds in the basement. After helping around Winslow High, she was given a teaching position and began her relationship with Scott shortly thereafter. A hook eventually took her right hand's place, which earned her the nickname of "The Hook Lady." The hook was later replaced by a prosthetic given to her by Scott as a gift. She was eventually fired by Scott for hitting Marcie Kendall, which subsequently ended their increasingly shaky relationship. She makes her final appearance at Ronnie's disastrous surprise birthday party for Harry in "Chapter Forty-One."
- Jeremy Peters (Kaj-Erik Eriksen) was Meredith's son. In Season 1, he was the student with the highest grades in his class and a student of Marilyn's. Marilyn consistently tried to help him when she suspected that his mother abused him; Jeremy eventually admitted to her that his mother would lock him in the basement as punishment. Near the end of Season 1, Jeremy's behavior significantly changed. He shifted from reserved and timid to sociable and rebellious. When Marilyn couldn't get in touch with Meredith, she suspected that Jeremy had done something to her. In the second-season premiere, Jeremy brought a severed hand into school to dissect. When Marilyn found out that the hand had belonged to a middle-aged woman, she began to theorize that the hand belonged to Meredith. She soon learned that Meredith was alive and well, but was indeed missing her right hand. It was later revealed that during her mysterious disappearance and Jeremy's dramatic change in behavior, Jeremy had actually locked her in the basement out of retaliation. After she lost the missing hand in an attempt to escape, they patched up their relationship with the help of family therapy. When Scott and Meredith began their relationship, Jeremy was jealous of the love his mother gave to Scott but never gave to him as a child. Scott likened their mother-son relationship to that of Norman Bates and his mother. At some point, Scott discovered Jeremy kissing another boy backstage during a theater rehearsal, and it was assumed that he was gay. It was revealed that Jeremy was actually bisexual when Scott later discovered him kissing Brooke Harper. Jeremy's relationship with Brooke was sabotaged by Meredith due to her unusually accepting attitude towards the couple. Jeremy's last appearance is in the school hallway, when he's blown off by Scott after Meredith's departure from the show. It's presumed that he graduated with the rest of his class since he did not return in Season 3.
- Marcie Kendall (Cara DeLizia) was a student whom Meredith slapped with her prosthesis during an argument, leading to Meredith being fired. In the third season, Marcie became Scott's assistant and was involved in the student walkout. Later on, she became pregnant by her boyfriend; overwhelmed by her impending responsibilities of being a mother, she decided to give up her baby for adoption.
- Robin Chambers (L.B. Fisher) was a transgender student who caused an uproar and some gay-bashing when he chose to become a candidate for prom queen. He won the contest and ended up winning a dance with the prom king, who subtly came out as being gay to Robin; the two danced the night away. Neither student is seen again.
- Patricia Emerson (Anne Archer) was the sultry and middle-aged mother of Becky Emerson who claimed to be the descendant of poet Ralph Waldo Emerson and even kept her maiden name when she married her husband, an arms dealer. She complained to Colin Flynn about his grade on Becky's assignment and, unhappy with her marriage, flirted with him, leading to an affair with the young teacher. Ultimately, Patricia reconciled with her husband and ended the affair.
- Rebecca 'Becky' Emerson (Courtney Peldon) was the beautiful but nutty daughter of Patricia Emerson who developed a crush on Colin and was devastated when she learned that he was sleeping with her mother. As a result, she threatened to expose Colin's affair at a poetry reading until she saw her parents together again and decided not to. Later, she became the anchorwoman of the Student television station and was about to air footage of a married teacher having sex with another woman in a classroom, but was persuaded from doing so by Danny. In the series' fourth and final season, Becky became Scott's assistant and once gave him surprisingly insightful advice.
- Devon Rick (Matt Lutz) was a gay teenager on the swim team who watched as his boyfriend was beaten up by their homophobic teammates. The incident prompted Scott to start up a Gay-Straight Alliance and lecture the school on the evils of homophobia. Eventually, Scott persuaded Devon to come out and identify the students who beat up his boyfriend.
- Dave Fields (David Conrad) was liaison to the Mayor pushing for standardized testing and budget cuts. He persuaded Ronnie to act as his eyes and ears in the school, and even offered her a possible political career, but Ronnie eventually rejected his offer of romance and politics.
- Riley Ellis (Andrea Bowen) was a 12-year-old prodigy looking for a normal friendship while attending Winslow High. Steven persuaded Brooke to be her friend, but Riley rejected the friendship when she realized that Brooke was only doing it to try to get close to a male student that she had a crush on. Riley later became Becky's friend and worked with her in the student television station.
- Taylor Prentice (Verne Troyer) was a little person (or dwarf) ex-professor who helped underachieving students ace exams and later dated Marla. They eventually broke up.
- Henry Preston (Phil Buckman) was an eccentric art teacher who came on towards the end of the series, and had to deal with the frustration of budget cuts. Later, he persuaded a student to focus his talents on mathematics and use art as a secondary hobby. In the final episode of the series, which was left unaired in the United States until WE: Women's Entertainment, showed Henry slept with Ronnie, who had previously been acting as a therapist of sorts to Henry, and was suspended from the school after hugging a sobbing female student. The suspension caused the students to stage a sit-in in his favor.
- Charlie Bixby (Dennis Miller) was a smart-alecky and arrogant investment banker who was forced to teach math at Winslow High as part of his community service for being convicted of securities fraud. He was able to reach his students by devising math problems with references to illicit drugs and prostitution, and volunteered at the school's suicide hotline where he befriended a teenager whom he persuaded to not kill himself. Charlie disappeared in the middle of the final season without explanation. Bixby had a habit of repeating his name for seemingly no reason, a characteristic shared by Denny Crane, another character later created by David E. Kelley.
- Peter Feldman (Miko Hughes) was a student who, after being electrocuted in Danny's class, came to believe that he was Jesus Christ. As such, he began to come to school dressed in ceremonial robes, offering advice to Danny and even using student fees to help a homeless man. Eventually, it was discovered that the reason behind his assuming the identity of Jesus was that he witnessed a young boy get hit by a bus one afternoon.
- Julien (Thomas Dekker) was a student who came out to his father, who beat him and his mother. Julien ran away from home, prompting Danny and Claire to track him down and get him to live with his mother, who had finally left her bigoted and abusive husband.
- Ms. Parks (Cleo King) was a parent who often complained to Steven about something at the school. In one example, after Harry Senate brought his class to a morgue to see a suicide victim, her daughter vomited on her shoes. She then put his shoe in the principal's face, complaining about their cost.
- Daniel Evans (Scott Vickaryous) a former Boston Public student, features in four consecutive episodes.
