= Anthony Heald =

American actor

- Born: August 25, 1944 (age 82); New Rochelle, New York, U.S.
- Education: Michigan State University
- Occupation: Actor
- Years active: 1983–present
- Spouse: Robin Herskowitz (m. 1985)
- Children: 2

Anthony Heald (born August 25, 1944) is an American character actor known for portraying Hannibal Lecter's jailer, Dr. Frederick Chilton, in The Silence of the Lambs (1991) and Red Dragon (2002), and for playing vice principal Scott Guber in David E. Kelley's Boston Public (2000–2004). Heald also had a recurring role as Judge Cooper on Kelley's The Practice and Boston Legal. (Note: The character was named "Wallace Cooper" on The Practice but "Harvey Cooper" on Boston Legal.) He had a prominent role as a troubled psychic in The X-Files episode "Closure".

== Early years ==
Heald was born on August 25, 1944, in New Rochelle, New York, and grew up in Massapequa, New York. He graduated from Michigan State University in 1970.

== Career ==
Heald has worked extensively on Broadway and has been twice nominated for the Tony Award for his work as Lord Evelyn Oakleigh in Anything Goes (1988) and Terrence McNally's Love! Valour! Compassion! (1995). He also appeared in McNally's The Lisbon Traviata (1989), Inherit the Wind (1998), Deep Rising (1998), and Lips Together, Teeth Apart (1991).

Heald has recorded audio books on tape, including works as varied as Where the Red Fern Grows, The New York Times bestsellers such as The Pelican Brief, Jurassic Park and Midnight in the Garden of Good and Evil, Moby-Dick, several works by science fiction writer Philip K. Dick, as well as a sizable number of titles in the Star Wars audio book library.

On television, Heald made appearances in shows including Miami Vice ("The Prodigal Son"), Law & Order ("The Troubles" and "Virtue"), The X-Files ("Closure"), and the Cheers series finale ("One for the Road"). He later appeared on the Cheers spin-off Frasier. He also played vice principal Scott Guber in David E. Kelley's Boston Public (2000–2004). Heald also had a recurring role as Judge Cooper on Kelley's The Practice and Boston Legal. (Note: The character was named "Wallace Cooper" on The Practice but "Harvey Cooper" on Boston Legal.)

In film, Heald appeared as Hannibal Lecter's jailer, Dr. Frederick Chilton, in The Silence of the Lambs (1991) and Red Dragon (2002). He also appeared as different characters in three adaptations of John Grisham best-sellers: a villainous lawyer in The Pelican Brief (1993), an FBI Agent in The Client (1994), and a psychiatrist in A Time to Kill (1996). He also played a government agent posing as an acting student in Outrageous Fortune (1987), George Lazan in Postcards from the Edge (1990), and an FBI Mystique Interrogator in X-Men: The Last Stand (2006).

Heald taught acting in Lansing, Michigan, for four years.

== Personal life ==
Heald lives in Ashland, Oregon, with his wife Robin (daughter of violist Karen Tuttle) and children Zoe and Dylan. He has converted to Judaism, his wife's faith. He regularly performs in productions of the Oregon Shakespeare Festival. During the 2010 season of the Oregon Shakespeare Festival, Heald played Shylock in Shakespeare's The Merchant of Venice.

== Filmography ==
=== Film ===
Year	Title	Role	Notes
1983	Silkwood	2nd Doctor at Union Meeting	
1984	Teachers	Narc	
1984	The Beniker Gang	Mr. Uldrich	
1987	Outrageous Fortune	Agent Weldon	
1987	Happy New Year	Dinner Guest	
1987	Orphans	Man in Park	
1990	Postcards from the Edge	George Lazan	
1991	The Silence of the Lambs	Dr. Frederick Chilton	
1991	The Super	Ron Nessim	
1992	Whispers in the Dark	Paul	
1993	Searching for Bobby Fischer	Fighting Parent	
1993	The Ballad of Little Jo	Henry Grey	
1993	The Pelican Brief	Marty Velmano	
1994	The Client	FBI Agent Larry Trumann	
1995	Kiss of Death	Jack Gold	
1995	Bushwhacked	Reinhart Bragdon	
1996	A Time to Kill	Dr. Wilbert Rodeheaver	
1998	Deep Rising	Simon Canton	
1999	8mm	Daniel Longdale	
2000	Proof of Life	Ted Fellner	
2002	Red Dragon	Dr. Frederick Chilton	
2006	X-Men: The Last Stand	FBI Mystique Interrogator	
2006	Accepted	Dean Richard Van Horne	
2020	Alone	Robert	

=== Television ===
Year	Title	Role	Notes
1985	Miami Vice	Commander René	Episode: "The Prodigal Son"
1985	Spenser: For Hire	The Doorman	Episode: "No Room at the Inn"
1986	Fresno	Kevin Kensington	6 episodes
1986	Tales from the Darkside	Englebert Ames	Episode: "Comet Watch"
1986	Kay O'Brien	Bert Hammond	Episode: "Behind Closed Doors"
1986	Guiding Light	Mallory	Episode: #1.10055
1986	A Case of Deadly Force	Dave O'Brian	TV movie
1987	Crime Story	Rojer Jankowski	Episode: "The Battle of Las Vegas"
1990	Against the Law	Grainger	Episode: "Where the Truth Lies"
1991	CBS Schoolbreak Special	Dr. Gil Morris	Episode: "Abby, My Love"
1991, 1994	Law & Order	Councilman Spencer Talbert / Ian O'Connell	Episodes: "The Troubles" (1991) and "Virtue" (1994)
1993	Class of '96	Professor Davis	Episode: "They Shoot Baskets, Don't They"
1993	Cheers	Kevin	Episode: "One for the Road"
1994	Ghostwriter	Harold Wentwood	Episode: "A Crime of Two Cities: Part One"
1994	Murder, She Wrote	Bob Kendall	Episode: "To Kill a Legend"
1994	Under Suspicion	Martin Fox	2 episodes
1995	One Life to Live	Quilligan	Episode: #1.6998
1995	New York News		Episode: "You Thought the Pope Was Something"
1996	Poltergeist: The Legacy	Damon Ballard	Episode: "Sins of the Father"
1997	Cosby	President's Aide	Episode: "Guess Whose President Is Coming to Dinner"
1997	Liberty! The American Revolution	Philip Vickers Fithian	6 episodes
2000	The X-Files	Harold Piller	Episode: "Closure"
2000	Frasier	Corkmaster	Episode: "Whine Club"
2000–2001	The Practice	Judge Wallace Cooper / Scott Guber	3 episodes
2000–2004	Boston Public	Scott Guber	81 episodes
2002	Benjamin Franklin	Jonathan L. Austin	3 episodes
2004	Revenge of the Middle-Aged Woman	Simon (uncredited)	TV movie
2005	Numbers	Walt Merrick	Episode: "Pilot"
2005	NCIS	Guyman Purcell	Episode: "An Eye for an Eye"
2005	According to Jim	Reverend Steven	Episode: "Wedding Bell Blues"
2005–2008	Boston Legal	Judge Harvey Cooper	8 episodes
2006	Crossing Jordan	Attorney McBride	Episode: "The Elephant in the Room"
2006	The Closer	Howard Pierce	Episode: "Heroic Measures"
2013	Monday Mornings	Mitch Tompkins	4 episodes
2014	Sam & Cat	Dr. Slarm	Episode: "#SuperPsycho"
2024	A Man in Full	Judge Taylor	4 episodes
