= This Is Where We Live (film) =

- Poster
- Directed by: Marc Menchaca; Josh Barrett
- Written by: Marc Menchaca
- Produced by: Benjamin Fuqua
- Starring: Ron Hayden; C.K. McFarland; Marc Menchaca; Tobias Segal; Frankie Shaw; Barry Corbin
- Cinematography: Ryan Booth
- Edited by: Scott Brignac; Filip K. Kasperaszek
- Music by: Brian Elmquist; Brian Murphy; Kanene Pipkin
- Release date: March 9, 2013 (SXSW)
- Running time: 92 minutes
- Country: United States
- Language: English

This Is Where We Live is a 2013 American drama film written by Marc Menchaca, directed by Menchaca and Josh Barrett and starring Ron Hayden, C.K. McFarland, Menchaca, Tobias Segal, Frankie Shaw and Barry Corbin.

== Cast ==
- Ron Hayden as Bob
- C.K. McFarland as Diane
- Marc Menchaca as Noah
- Tobias Segal as August
- Frankie Shaw as Lainey
- Barry Corbin as Bode
- Christine Bruno as Kit
- Carolyn Gilroy as Mindy

== Release ==
The film premiered at South by Southwest on March 9, 2013. Then it was released on November 22, 2013.

== Reception ==
The film has an 86% rating on Rotten Tomatoes based on seven reviews.

The Hollywood Reporter gave the film a positive review: "This beautifully acted, admirably understated drama never succumbs to mawkishness."

Jeannette Catsoulis of The New York Times gave the film a negative review and wrote, "But though the developing bond between the two men — one of whom is virtually nonverbal — is credible and even touching, the storytelling is too oblique to reel you in."
