= Independent Spirit Award for Best First Feature =

Annual US film award

- Presented by: Independent Spirit Awards
- First award: She's Gotta Have It (1986)
- Currently held by: Lurker (2025)
- Website: spiritawards.com

The Independent Spirit Award for Best First Feature is one of the annual Independent Spirit Awards. It is usually given to the director (or directors) and producer (or producers). The "first feature" designation is applied to the director not the producer(s). Therefore, producers have been nominated multiple times. It was first presented in 1986 with Spike Lee's She's Gotta Have It being the first recipient of the award.

In 2000, this category was split into two separate categories: one for films with budgets over $500,000 and a new category, the Independent Spirit John Cassavetes Award, which was restricted to films with budgets under $500,000. In 2001, films could be eligible regardless of their budget as long as it was feature film directorial debut.

== Winners and nominees ==
=== 1980s ===
Year	Winner	Director(s)	Producer(s)
1986	She's Gotta Have It	Spike Lee	
1986	Belizaire the Cajun	Glen Pitre	Allan L. Durand
1986	A Great Wall	Peter Wang	Shirley Sun
1986	Hoosiers	David Anspaugh	John Daly, Carter DeHaven, Derek Gibson and Angelo Pizzo
1986	True Stories	David Byrne	Gary Kurfirst
1987	Dirty Dancing	Emile Ardolino	Linda Gottlieb
1987	Anna	Yurek Bogayevicz	Zanne Devine
1987	Hollywood Shuffle	Robert Townsend	Carl Craig
1987	Siesta	Mary Lambert	Gary Kurfirst
1987	Waiting for the Moon	Jill Godmilow	Sandra Schulberg
1988	Mystic Pizza	Donald Petrie	Mark Levinson and Scott M. Rosenfelt
1988	Border Radio	Allison Anders, Dean Lent and Kurt Voss	Marcus DeLeon
1988	The Chocolate War	Keith Gordon	Jonathan D. Krane
1988	The Prince of Pennsylvania	Ron Nyswaner	Jonathan D. Krane
1988	The Wash	Michael Toshiyuki Uno	Calvin Skaggs
1989	Heathers	Michael Lehmann	Denise Di Novi
1989	84 Charlie Mopic	Patrick Sheane Duncan	Michael Nolan
1989	Powwow Highway	Jonathan Wacks	Jan Wieringa
1989	Sidewalk Stories	Charles Lane	Howard M. Brickner
1989	Talking to Strangers	Rob Tregenza	J.K. Eareckson

=== 1990s ===
Year	Winner	Director(s)	Producer(s)
1990	Metropolitan	Whit Stillman	
1990	House Party	Reginald Hudlin	Warrington Hudlin
1990	Lightning Over Braddock	Tony Buba	
1990	The Natural History of Parking Lots	Everett Lewis	Aziz Ghazal
1990	Twister	Michael Almereyda	Wieland Schulz-Keil
1991	Straight Out of Brooklyn	Matty Rich	
1991	Chameleon Street	Wendell B. Harris Jr.	
1991	Poison	Todd Haynes	Christine Vachon
1991	The Rapture	Michael Tolkin	Karen Koch, Nancy Tenenbaum and Nick Wechsler
1991	Slacker	Richard Linklater	
1992	The Waterdance	Neal Jimenez and Michael Steinberg	Gale Anne Hurd, Marie Cantin and Guy Riedel
1992	Laws of Gravity	Nick Gomez	Bob Gosse and Larry Meistrich
1992	My New Gun	Stacy Cochran	Michael Flynn
1992	Reservoir Dogs	Quentin Tarantino	Lawrence Bender
1992	Swoon	Tom Kalin	Christine Vachon
1993	El Mariachi	Robert Rodriguez	Robert Rodriguez and Carlos Gallardo
1993	American Heart	Martin Bell	Jeff Bridges and Rosilyn Heller
1993	Combination Platter	Tony Chan	Tony Chan and Judy Moy
1993	Mac	John Turturro	Brenda Goodman and Nancy Tenenbaum
1993	Menace II Society	Allen and Albert Hughes	Darin Scott
1994	Spanking the Monkey	David O. Russell	Dean Silvers
1994	Clean, Shaven	Lodge Kerrigan	
1994	Clerks	Kevin Smith	Kevin Smith and Scott Mosier
1994	I Like It Like That	Darnell Martin	Lane Janger
1994	Suture	David Siegel and Scott McGehee	David Siegel, Scott McGehee, and Michele Petin
1995	The Brothers McMullen	Edward Burns	Dick Fisher
1995	Kids	Larry Clark	Cary Woods
1995	Little Odessa	James Gray	Paul Webster
1995	Picture Bride	Kayo Hatta	Diane Mei Lin Mark and Lisa Onodera
1995	River of Grass	Kelly Reichardt	Jesse Hartman
1996	Sling Blade	Billy Bob Thornton	David L. Bushell and Brandon Rosser
1996	Big Night	Campbell Scott and Stanley Tucci	Jonathan Filley
1996	I Shot Andy Warhol	Mary Harron	Tom Kalin and Christine Vachon
1996	Manny & Lo	Lisa Krueger	Marlen Hecht and Dean Silvers
1996	Trees Lounge	Steve Buscemi	Chris Hanley and Brad Wyman
1997	Eve's Bayou	Kasi Lemmons	Caldecot Chubb and Samuel L. Jackson
1997	The Bible and Gun Club	Daniel J. Harris	
1997	Hard Eight	Paul Thomas Anderson	Robert Jones and John S. Lyons
1997	In the Company of Men	Neil LaBute	Mark Archer and Stephen Pevner
1997	Star Maps	Miguel Arteta	Matthew Greenfield
1998	The Opposite of Sex	Don Roos	David Kirkpatrick and Michael Besman
1998	Buffalo '66	Vincent Gallo	Chris Hanley
1998	High Art	Lisa Cholodenko	Dolly Hall, Jeffrey Levy-Hinte and Susan A. Stover
1998	π	Darren Aronofsky	Eric Watson
1998	Slums of Beverly Hills	Tamara Jenkins	Michael Nozik and Stan Wlodkowski
1999	Being John Malkovich	Spike Jonze	Michael Stipe, Sandy Stern, Steve Golin and Vincent Landay
1999	Boys Don't Cry	Kimberly Peirce	Jeffrey Sharp, John Hart, Eva Kolodner and Christine Vachon
1999	Three Seasons	Tony Bui	Jason Kliot and Joana Vicente
1999	Twin Falls Idaho	Michael Polish	Marshall Persinger, Rena Ronson and Steven J. Wolfe
1999	Xiu Xiu: The Sent Down Girl	Joan Chen	Joan Chen and Wai-Chung Chan

=== 2000s ===
Year	Winner	Director(s)	Producer(s)
2000	You Can Count on Me	Kenneth Lonergan	John Hart, Jeffrey Sharp, Barbara De Fina and Larry Meistrich
2000	Boiler Room	Ben Younger	Jennifer Todd and Suzanne Todd
2000	Girlfight	Karyn Kusama	Maggie Renzi, Sarah Green and Martha Griffin
2000	Love & Basketball	Gina Prince-Bythewood	Spike Lee and Sam Kitt
2000	The Visit	Jordan Walker-Pearlman	
2001	In the Bedroom	Todd Field	Todd Field, Ross Katz, and Graham Leader
2001	The Anniversary Party	Alan Cumming and Jennifer Jason Leigh	
2001	The Believer	Henry Bean	Susan Hoffman and Christopher Roberts
2001	Donnie Darko	Richard Kelly	Sean McKittrick, Nancy Juvonen, and Adam Fields
2001	Ghost World	Terry Zwigoff	Lianne Halfon, John Malkovich, and Russell Smith
2002	The Dangerous Lives of Altar Boys	Peter Care	Jodie Foster, Meg LeFauve, Jay Shapiro, and Todd McFarlane
2002	Interview with the Assassin	Neil Burger	Brian Koppelman and David Levien
2002	Manito	Eric Eason	Jesse Scolaro and Allen Bain
2002	Paid in Full	Charles Stone III	Damon Dash, Jay-Z, Brett Ratner, Azie Faison, and Steve Rifkind
2002	Roger Dodger	Dylan Kidd	Dylan Kidd, Anne Chaisson, and Campbell Scott
2003	Monster	Patty Jenkins	Mark Damon, Donald Kushner, Clark Peterson, Charlize Theron and Brad Wyman
2003	Bomb the System	Adam Bhala Lough	Ben Rekhi and Sol Tryon
2003	House of Sand and Fog	Vadim Perelman	Vadim Perelman and Michael London
2003	Quattro Noza	Joey Curtis	Fredric King
2003	Thirteen	Catherine Hardwicke	Jeffrey Levy-Hinte and Michael London
2004	Garden State	Zach Braff	Pamela Abdy, Gary Gilbert, Dan Halsted and Richard Klubeck
2004	Brother to Brother	Rodney Evans	Rodney Evans, Jim McKay, Isen Robbins and Aimee Schoof
2004	Napoleon Dynamite	Jared Hess	Jeremy Coon, Sean Covel and Chris Wyatt
2004	Saints and Soldiers	Ryan Little	Ryan Little and Adam Abel
2004	The Woodsman	Nicole Kassell	Lee Daniels
2005	Crash	Paul Haggis	Paul Haggis, Cathy Schulman, Don Cheadle, Bob Yari, Mark R. Harris and Bobby Moresco
2005	Lackawanna Blues	George C. Wolfe	Halle Berry, Vince Cirrincione, Ruben Santiago-Hudson, Nellie Nugiel and Shelby Stone
2005	Me and You and Everyone We Know	Miranda July	Gina Kwon
2005	Thumbsucker	Mike Mills	Anthony Bregman and Bob Stephenson
2005	Transamerica	Duncan Tucker	Sebastian Dungan, Linda Moran and Rene Bastian
2006	Sweet Land	Ali Selim	Alan Cumming and James Bigham
2006	Day Night Day Night	Julia Loktev	Melanie Judd and Jessica Levin
2006	Man Push Cart	Ramin Bahrani	Pradip Ghosh and Bedford T. Bentley
2006	The Motel	Michael Kang	Matthew Greenfield, Miguel Arteta, Gina Kwon and Karin Chien
2006	Wristcutters: A Love Story	Goran Dukić	Adam Sherman, Chris Coen, Tatiana Kelly and Mikal P. Lazarev
2007	The Lookout	Scott Frank	Roger Birnbaum, Gary Barber, Laurence Mark and Walter F. Parkes
2007	2 Days in Paris	Julie Delpy	Christophe Mazodier and Thierry Potok
2007	Great World of Sound	Craig Zobel	Craig Zobel, Melissa Palmer, David Gordon Green and Richard A. Wright
2007	Rocket Science	Jeffrey Blitz	Effie Brown and Sean Welch
2007	Vanaja	Rajnesh Domalpalli	Latha R. Domalapalli
2008	Synecdoche, New York	Charlie Kaufman	Charlie Kaufman, Anthony Bregman, Spike Jonze and Sidney Kimmel
2008	Afterschool	Antonio Campos	T. Sean Durkin and Josh Mond
2008	Medicine for Melancholy	Barry Jenkins	Justin Barber
2008	Sangre de Mi Sangre	Christopher Zalla	Per Melita and Ben Odell
2008	Sleep Dealer	Alex Rivera	Anthony Bregman
2009	Crazy Heart	Scott Cooper	Scott Cooper, Robert Duvall, Rob Carliner, Judy Cairo and T-Bone Burnett
2009	Easier with Practice	Kyle Patrick Alvarez	Cookie Carosella
2009	The Messenger	Oren Moverman	Mark Gordon, Lawrence Inglee and Zach Miller
2009	Paranormal Activity	Oren Peli	Oren Peli and Jason Blum
2009	A Single Man	Tom Ford	Tom Ford, Chris Weitz, Andrew Miano and Robert Salerno

=== 2010s ===
Year	Winner	Director(s)	Producer(s)
2010	Get Low	Aaron Schneider	Dean Zanuck and David Gundlach
2010	Everything Strange and New	Frazer Bradshaw	Laura Techera Francia and A.D. Liano
2010	The Last Exorcism	Daniel Stamm	Eric Newman, Eli Roth, Marc Abraham and Thomas A. Bliss
2010	Night Catches Us	Tanya Hamilton	Ronald Simon, Sean Costello and Jason Orans
2010	Tiny Furniture	Lena Dunham	Kyle Martin and Alicia Van Couvering
2011	Margin Call	J. C. Chandor	Joe Jenckes, Robert Ogden Barnum, Corey Moosa, Michael Benaroya, Neal Dodson and Zachary Quinto
2011	Another Earth	Mike Cahill	Hunter Gray, Mike Cahill, Brit Marling and Nicholas Shumaker
2011	In the Family	Patrick Wang	Patrick Wang, Andrew van den Houten and Robert Tonino
2011	Martha Marcy May Marlene	Sean Durkin	Josh Mond, Antonio Campos, Chris Maybach and Patrick Cunningham
2011	Natural Selection	Robbie Pickering	Brion Hambell and Paul Jensen
2012	The Perks of Being a Wallflower	Stephen Chbosky	Lianne Halfon, Russell Smith and John Malkovich
2012	Fill the Void	Rama Burshtein	Assaf Amir
2012	Gimme the Loot	Adam Leon	Natalie Difford, Dominic Buchanan and Jamund Washington
2012	Safety Not Guaranteed	Colin Trevorrow	Marc Turtletaub, Peter Saraf, Stephanie Langhoff, Derek Connolly and Colin Trevorrow
2012	Sound of My Voice	Zal Batmanglij	Hans Ritter, Brit Marling and Shelley Surpin
2013	Fruitvale Station	Ryan Coogler	Nina Yang Bongiovi and Forest Whitaker
2013	Blue Caprice	Alexandre Moors	Isen Robbins, Aimee Schoof, Ron Simons, Stephen Tedeschi, Brian O'Connell, Kim Jackson and Will Rowbotham
2013	Concussion	Stacie Passon	Cliff Chenfeld, Anthony Cupo and Rose Troche
2013	Una Noche	Lucy Mulloy	Daniel Mulloy, Lucy Mulloy, Maite Artieda and Sandy Perez Aguila
2013	Wadjda	Haifaa al-Mansour	Gerhard Meixner and Roman Paul
2014	Nightcrawler	Dan Gilroy	Jennifer Fox, Tony Gilroy, Michel Litvak, Jake Gyllenhaal and David Lancaster
2014	Dear White People	Justin Simien	Effie Brown, Ann Le, Julia Lebedev, Angel Lopez, Justin Simien and Lena Waithe
2014	A Girl Walks Home Alone at Night	Ana Lily Amirpour	Justin Begnaud and Sina Sayyah
2014	Obvious Child	Gillian Robespierre	Elisabeth Holm
2014	She's Lost Control	Anja Marquardt	Anja Marquardt, Mollye Asher and Kiara C. Jones
2015	The Diary of a Teenage Girl	Marielle Heller	Miranda Bailey, Anne Carey, Bert Hamelinck, and Madeline Samit
2015	James White	Josh Mond	Max Born, Antonio Campos, Sean Durkin, Melody Roscher, and Eric Schultz
2015	Manos sucias	Josef Kubota Wladyka	Elena Greenlee and Márcia Nunes
2015	Mediterranea	Jonas Carpignano	Jason Michael Berman, Chris Columbus, Jon Coplon, Christoph Daniel, Andrew Kortschak, John Lesher, Ryan Lough, Justin Nappi, Alain Peyrollaz, Gwyn Sannia, Marc Schmidheiny, Victor Shapiro, and Ryan Zacarias
2015	Songs My Brother Taught Me	Chloé Zhao	Chloé Zhao, Mollye Asher, Nina Yang Bongiovi, Angela C. Lee, and Forest Whitaker
2016	The Witch	Robert Eggers	Robert Eggers, Daniel Bekerman, Jay Van Hoy, Lars Knudsen, Jodi Redmond, and Rodrigo Teixeira
2016	The Childhood of a Leader	Brady Corbet	Antoine de Clermont-Tonnerre, Chris Coen, Ron Curtis, Helena Danielsson, Mona Fastvold, and István Major
2016	The Fits	Anna Rose Holmer	Anna Rose Holmer and Lisa Kjerulff
2016	Other People	Chris Kelly	Sam Bisbee, Adam Scott, and Naomi Scott
2016	Swiss Army Man	Daniel Scheinert and Daniel Kwan	Miranda Bailey, Lawrence Inglee, Lauren Mann, Amanda Marshall, Eyal Rimmon, and Jonathan Wang
2017	Ingrid Goes West	Matt Spicer	Jared Goldman, Adam Mirels, Robert Mirels, Aubrey Plaza, Tim White, and Trevor White
2017	Columbus	Kogonada	Danielle Renfrew Behrens, Aaron Boyd, Giulia Caruso, Ki Jin Kim, Andrew Miano, and Chris Weitz
2017	Menashe	Joshua Z. Weinstein	Yoni Brook, Traci Carlson, Daniel Finkelman, and Alex Lipschultz
2017	Oh Lucy!	Atsuko Hirayanagi	Jessica Elbaum, Yukie Kito, and Han West
2017	Patti Cake$	Geremy Jasper	Chris Columbus, Michael Gottwald, Dan Janvey, Daniela Taplin Lundberg, Noah Stahl, and Rodrigo Teixeira
2018	Sorry to Bother You	Boots Riley	Nina Yang Bongiovi, Kelly Williams, Jonathan Duffy, Charles D. King, George Rush, and Forest Whitaker
2018	Hereditary	Ari Aster	Kevin Frakes, Lars Knudsen, and Buddy Patrick
2018	The Tale	Jennifer Fox	Jennifer Fox, Oren Moverman, Laura Rister, Mynette Louie, Simone Pero, Lawrence Inglee, Sol Bondy, Regina K. Scully, Lynda Weinman, and Reka Posta
2018	We the Animals	Jeremiah Zagar	Jeremy Yaches, Christina D. King, Andrew Goldman, and Paul Mezey
2018	Wildlife	Paul Dano	Oren Moverman, Jake Gyllenhaal, Riva Marker, Ann Ruark, Alex Saks, Andrew Duncan, and Paul Dano
2019	Booksmart	Olivia Wilde	Megan Ellison, Chelsea Barnard, David Distenfield, Jessica Elbaum, Katie Silberman
2019	The Climb	Michael Angelo Covino	Michael Angelo Covino, Kyle Marvin, and Noah Lang
2019	Diane	Kent Jones	Luca Borghese, Ben Howe, Caroline Kaplan, and Oren Moverman
2019	The Last Black Man in San Francisco	Joe Talbot	Khaliah Neal, Joe Talbot, Dede Gardner, Jeremy Kleiner, and Christina Oh
2019	The Mustang	Laure de Clermont-Tonnerre	Alain Goldman
2019	See You Yesterday	Stefon Bristol	Spike Lee

=== 2020s ===
Year	Winner	Director(s)	Producer(s)
2020	Sound of Metal	Darius Marder	Bert Hamelinck, Sacha Ben Harroche, Bill Benz and Kathy Benz
2020	The 40-Year-Old Version	Radha Blank	Lena Waithe, Jordan Fudge, Radha Blank, Inuka Bacote-Capiga, Jennifer Semler and Rishi Rajani
2020	I Carry You With Me	Heidi Ewing	Heidi Ewing, Mynette Louie, Gabriela Maire and Edher Campos
2020	Miss Juneteenth	Channing Godfrey Peoples	Toby Halbrooks, Tim Headington, Jeanie Igoe, James M. Johnston, Theresa Page and Neil Creque Williams
2020	Nine Days	Edson Oda	Jason Michael Berman, Mette-Marie Kongsved, Matthew Linder, Laura Tunstall and Datari Turner
2021	7 Days	Roshan Sethi	Liz Cardenas, Mel Eslyn
2021	Holler	Nicole Riegel	Adam Cobb, Rachel Gould, Katie McNeill, Jamie Patricof and Christy Spitzer Thornton
2021	Queen of Glory	Nana Mensah	Baff Akoto, Anya Migdal, Kelley Robins Hicks and Jamund Washington
2021	Test Pattern	Shatara Michelle Ford	Pin-Chun Liu and Yu-Hao Su
2021	Wild Indian	Lyle Mitchell Corbine Jr.	Thomas Mahoney, Lyle Mitchell Corbine, Jr., and Eric Tavitian
2022	Aftersun	Charlotte Wells	Mark Ceryak, Amy Jackson, Barry Jenkins, Adele Romanski
2022	Emily the Criminal	John Patton Ford	Tyler Davidson, Aubrey Plaza, Drew Sykes
2022	The Inspection	Elegance Bratton	Effie T. Brown, Chester Algernal Gordon
2022	Murina	Antoneta Alamat Kusijanović	Danijel Pek, Rodrigo Teixeira
2022	Palm Trees and Power Lines	Jamie Dack	Leah Chen Baker
2023	A Thousand and One	A. V. Rockwell	Julia Lebedev, Rishi Rajani, Eddie Vaisman, Lena Waithe, and Brad Weston
2023	All Dirt Roads Taste of Salt	Raven Jackson	Maria Altamirano, Mark Ceryak, Barry Jenkins, and Adele Romanski
2023	Chronicles of a Wandering Saint	Tomás Gómez Bustillo	Gewan Brown and Amanda Freedman
2023	Earth Mama	Savanah Leaf	Sam Bisbee, Shirley O'Connor, Medb Riordan, and Cody Ryder
2023	Upon Entry	Alejandro Rojas and Juan Sebastián Vásquez	Sergio Adrià, Carlos Juárez, Alba Sotorra, Carles Torras, and Xosé Zapata
2024	Dìdi	Sean Wang	Valerie Bush, Carlos López Estrada, and Josh Peters
2024	In the Summers	Alessandra Lacorazza Samudio	Janek Ambros, Lynette Coll, Alexander Dinelaris, Cynthia Fernandez De La Cruz, Cristóbal Güell, Sergio Alberto Lira, Rob Quadrino, Jan Suter, Daniel Tantalean, Nando Vila, Slava Vladimirov, and Stephanie Yankwitt
2024	Janet Planet	Annie Baker	Andrew Goldman, Dan Janvey, and Derrick Tseng
2024	The Piano Lesson	Malcolm Washington	Todd Black and Denzel Washington
2024	Problemista	Julio Torres	Ali Herting, Dave McCary and Emma Stone
2025	Lurker	Alex Russell	Galen Core, Archie Madekwe, Marc Marrie, Charlie McDowell, Francesco Melzi D’Eril, Duncan Montgomery, Alex Orlovsky, Olmo Schnabel and Jack Selby
2025	Blue Sun Palace	Constance Tsang	Sally Sujin Oh, Eli Raskin and Tony Yang
2025	Dust Bunny	Bryan Fuller	Basil Iwanyk and Erica Lee
2025	East of Wall	Kate Beecroft	Shannon Moss, Melanie Ramsayer and Lila Yacoub
2025	One of Them Days	Lawrence Lamont	Deniese Davis, Poppy Hanks, James Lopez, Issa Rae, and Sara Rastogi
