= 31st Independent Spirit Awards =

US film awards ceremony in 2016

- Awarded for: Best in independent film
- Date: February 27, 2016
- Site: Santa Monica Pier; Santa Monica, California, U.S.
- Hosted by: Kate McKinnon; Kumail Nanjiani

Highlights
- Best Feature: Spotlight
- Most awards: Spotlight (5)
- Most nominations: Carol (6)

Television coverage
- Channel: IFC

The 31st Film Independent Spirit Awards, honoring the best independent films of 2015, were presented by Film Independent on February 27, 2016. The nominations were announced on November 24, 2015. The ceremony was hosted by Kate McKinnon and Kumail Nanjiani, and broadcast live on IFC.

== Winners and nominees ==
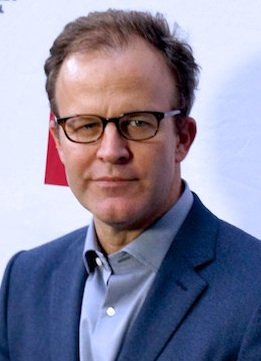
Tom McCarthy, Best Director winner and Best Screenplay co-winner

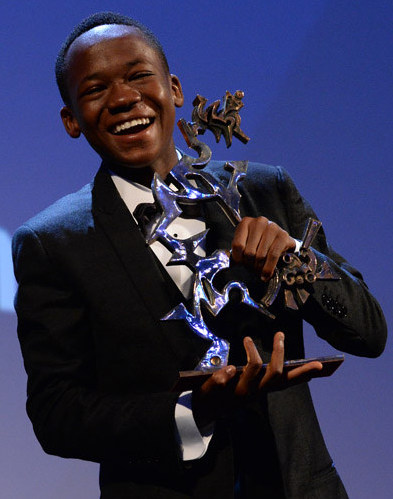
Abraham Attah, Best Male Lead winner

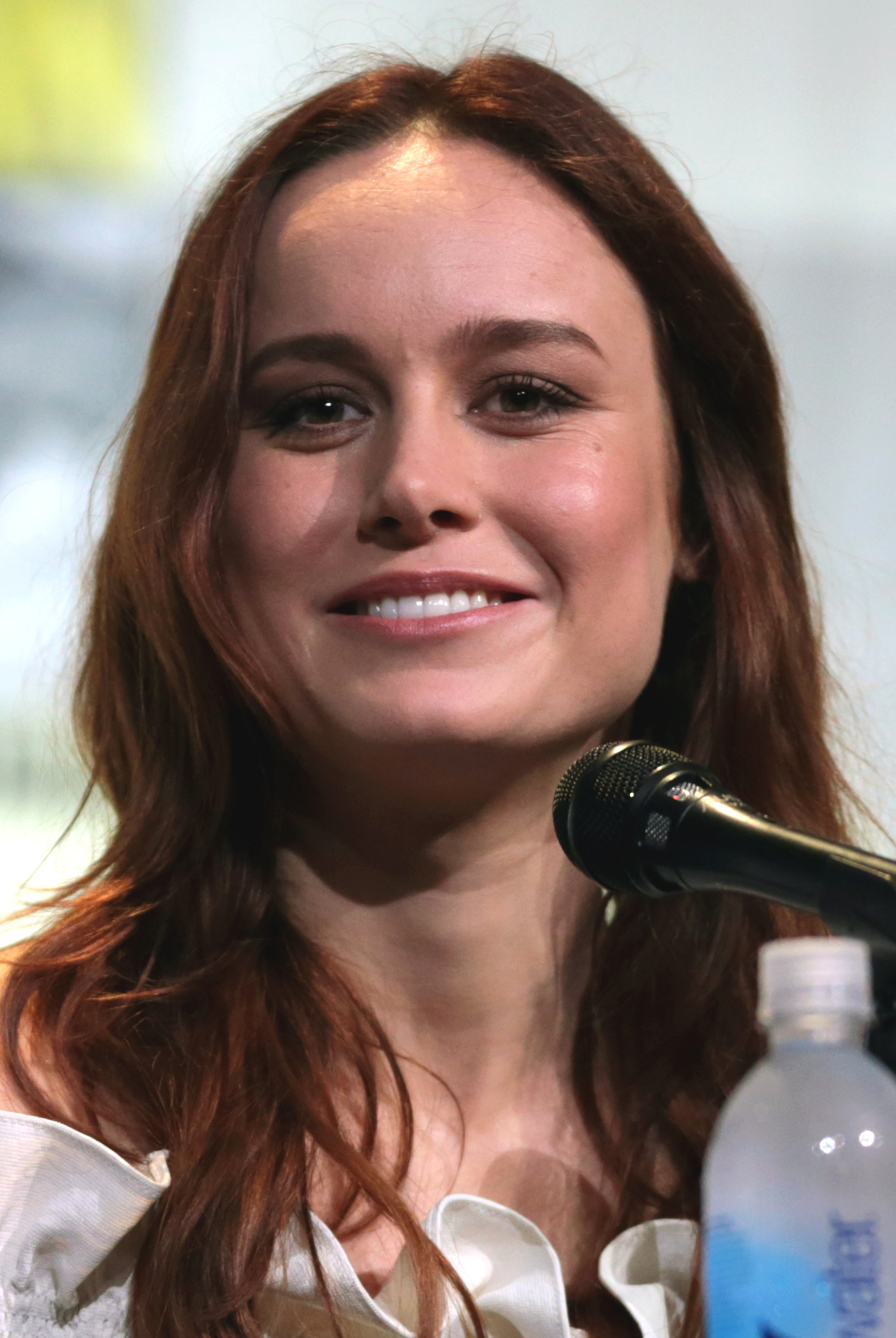
Brie Larson, Best Female Lead winner

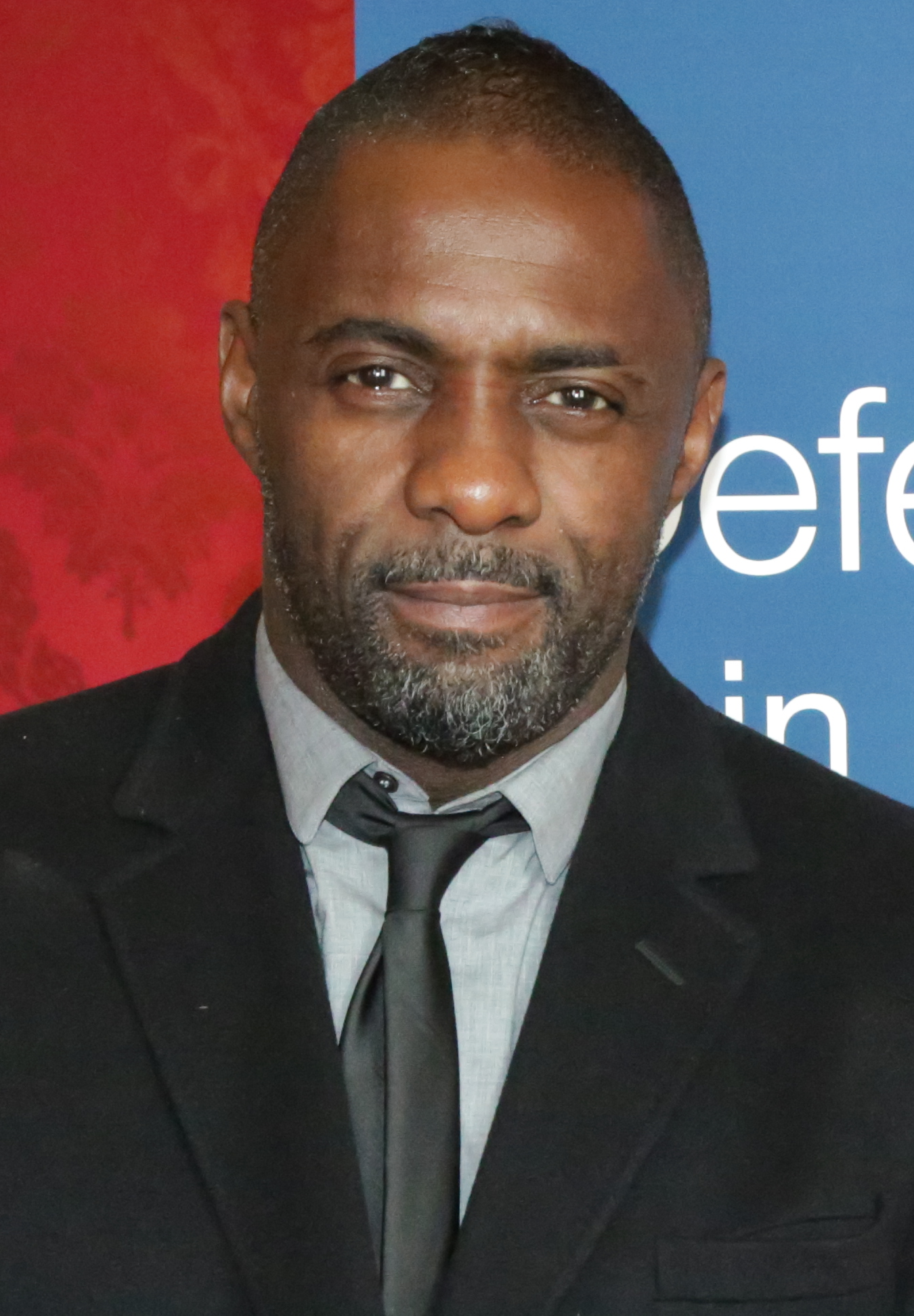
Idris Elba, Best Supporting Male winner

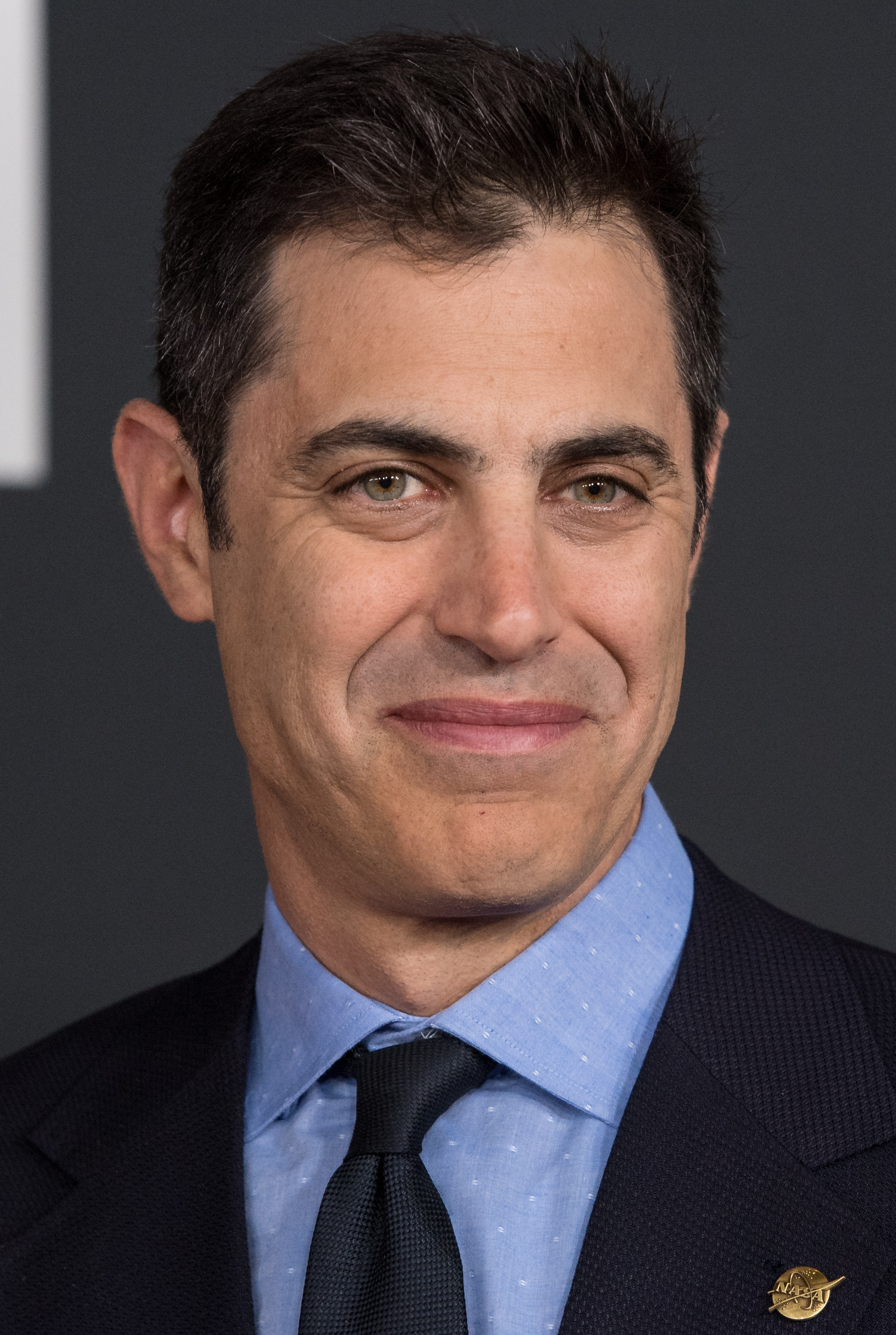
Josh Singer, Best Screenplay co-winner

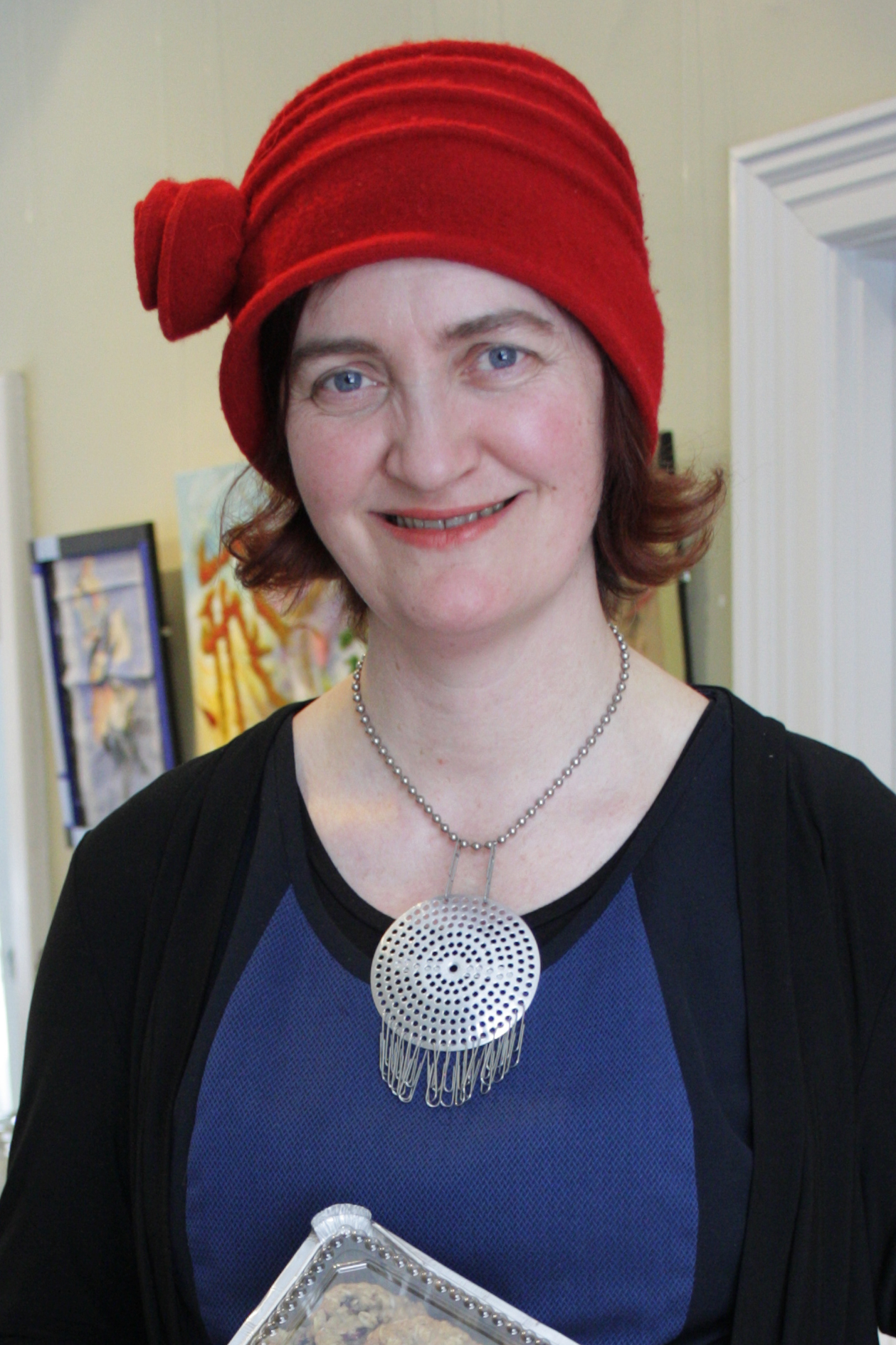
Emma Donoghue, Best First Screenplay winner

| Best Feature | Best Director |
|---|---|
| Spotlight: Anomalisa; Beasts of No Nation; Carol; Tangerine | Tom McCarthy – Spotlight: Sean Baker – Tangerine; Cary Joji Fukunaga – Beasts of No Nation; Todd Haynes – Carol; Charlie Kaufman and Duke Johnson – Anomalisa; David Robert Mitchell – It Follows |
| Best Male Lead | Best Female Lead |
| Abraham Attah – Beasts of No Nation as Agu: Christopher Abbott – James White as James White; Ben Mendelsohn – Mississippi Grind as Gerry; Jason Segel – The End of the Tour as David Foster Wallace; Koudous Seihon – Mediterranea as Ayiva | Brie Larson – Room as Joy "Ma" Newsome: Cate Blanchett – Carol as Carol Aird; Rooney Mara – Carol as Therese Belivet; Bel Powley – The Diary of a Teenage Girl as Minnie Goetze; Kitana Kiki Rodriguez – Tangerine as Sin-Dee Rella |
| Best Supporting Male | Best Supporting Female |
| Idris Elba – Beasts of No Nation as Commandant: Kevin Corrigan – Results as Danny; Paul Dano – Love & Mercy as Brian - Past; Richard Jenkins – Bone Tomahawk as Deputy Chicory; Michael Shannon – 99 Homes as Rick Carver | Mya Taylor – Tangerine as Alexandra: Robin Bartlett – H. as Helen; Marin Ireland – Glass Chin as Ellen Doyle; Jennifer Jason Leigh – Anomalisa as Lisa Hesselman; Cynthia Nixon – James White as Gail White |
| Best Screenplay | Best First Screenplay |
| Tom McCarthy and Josh Singer – Spotlight: Charlie Kaufman – Anomalisa; Donald Margulies – The End of the Tour; Phyllis Nagy – Carol; S. Craig Zahler – Bone Tomahawk | Emma Donoghue – Room: Jesse Andrews – Me and Earl and the Dying Girl; Jonas Carpignano – Mediterranea; Marielle Heller – The Diary of a Teenage Girl; John Magary, Russell Harbaugh, and Myna Joseph – The Mend |
| Best First Feature | Best Documentary Feature |
| The Diary of a Teenage Girl: James White; Manos sucias; Mediterranea; Songs My Brothers Taught Me | The Look of Silence: Best of Enemies; Heart of a Dog; Meru; The Russian Woodpecker; (T)error |
| Best Cinematography | Best Editing |
| Edward Lachman – Carol: Cary Joji Fukunaga – Beasts of No Nation; Mike Gioulakis – It Follows; Reed Morano – Meadowland; Joshua James Richards – Songs My Brothers Taught Me | Tom McArdle – Spotlight: Ronald Bronstein and Benny Safdie – Heaven Knows What; Nathan Nugent – Room; Julio C. Perez IV – It Follows; Kristan Sprague – Manos sucias |
Best International Film
Son of Saul (Saul fia) (Hungary): Embrace of the Serpent (El abrazo de la serpiente) (Colombia); Girlhood (Bande de filles) (France); Mustang (France / Germany / Turkey); A Pigeon Sat on a Branch Reflecting on Existence (En duva satt på en gren och funderade på tillvaron) (Sweden)

=== Films with multiple nominations and awards ===
Films that received multiple nominations
| Nominations | Film |
|---|---|
| 6 | Carol |
| 5 | Beasts of No Nation |
| 5 | Tangerine |
| 4 | Anomalisa |
| 4 | It Follows |
| 4 | Spotlight |
| 3 | The Diary of a Teenage Girl |
| 3 | James White |
| 3 | Mediterranea |
| 3 | Room |
| 3 | Songs My Brothers Taught Me |
| 2 | Bone Tomahawk |
| 2 | The End of the Tour |
| 2 | Heaven Knows What |
| 2 | Manos sucias |

Films that won multiple awards
| Awards | Film |
|---|---|
| 5 | Spotlight |
| 2 | Beasts of No Nation |
| 2 | Room |

== Special awards ==
=== John Cassavetes Award ===
Krisha

- Advantageous
- Christmas, Again
- Heaven Knows What
- Out of My Hand

=== Robert Altman Award ===
(The award is given to its film director, casting director, and ensemble cast)

- Spotlight – Tom McCarthy, Kerry Barden, Paul Schnee, Michael Cyril Creighton, Billy Crudup, Paul Guilfoyle, Neal Huff, Brian d'Arcy James, Michael Keaton, Rachel McAdams, Mark Ruffalo, Liev Schreiber, Jamey Sheridan, John Slattery, and Stanley Tucci

=== Kiehl's Someone to Watch Award ===
Recognizes a talented filmmaker of singular vision who has not yet received appropriate recognition. The award includes a $25,000 unrestricted grant funded by Kiehl's since 1851.

- Felix Thompson – King Jack
  - Robert Machoian and Rodrigo Ojeda-Beck – God Bless the Child
  - Chloé Zhao – Songs My Brothers Taught Me

=== Piaget Producers Award ===
Honors emerging producers who, despite highly limited resources, demonstrate the creativity, tenacity and vision required to produce quality, independent films. The award includes a $25,000 unrestricted grant funded by Piaget.

- Mel Eslyn – Lamb
  - Darren Dean – Tangerine
  - Rebecca Green and Laura D. Smith – It Follows and I'll See You in My Dreams

=== Truer than Fiction Award ===
Presented to an emerging director of non-fiction features who has not yet received significant recognition. The award includes a $25,000 unrestricted grant funded by LensCrafters.

- Elizabeth Chai Vasarhelyi – Incorruptible
  - Alex Sichel and Elizabeth Giamatti – A Woman Like Me
  - Hemal Trivedi and Mohammed Ali Naqvi – Among the Believers
