= Independent Spirit Award for Best Editing =

Film award given for achievement by independent film editors

- Awarded for: Best Editing
- Country: United States
- Presented by: Film Independent
- First award: 2013
- Currently held by: Sofía Subercaseaux for The Testament of Ann Lee (2025)
- Website: www.filmindependent.org

The Independent Spirit Award for Best Editing is one of the annual awards given out by Film Independent, a non-profit organization dedicated to independent film and independent filmmakers. It was first presented in 2013, with American editor Nat Sanders being the first recipient of the award for his work in Short Term 12.

== Winners and nominees ==
=== 2010s ===
Year	Film	Recipient(s)
2013	Short Term 12	Nat Sanders
2013	Upstream Color	Shane Carruth and David Lowery
2013	Museum Hours	Jem Cohen and Marc Vives
2013	Frances Ha	Jennifer Lame
2013	Una noche	Cindy Lee
2014	Whiplash	Tom Cross
2014	Boyhood	Sandra Adair
2014	Nightcrawler	John Gilroy
2014	A Most Violent Year	Ron Patane
2014	The Guest	Adam Wingard
2015	Spotlight	Tom McArdle
2015	Heaven Knows What	Ronald Bronstein and Benny Safdie
2015	Room	Nathan Nugent
2015	It Follows	Julio C. Perez IV
2015	Manos sucias	Kristan Sprague
2016	Moonlight	Joi McMillon and Nat Sanders
2016	Swiss Army Man	Matthew Hannam
2016	Manchester by the Sea	Jennifer Lame
2016	Hell or High Water	Jake Roberts
2016	Jackie	Sebastián Sepúlveda
2017	I, Tonya	Tatiana S. Riegel
2017	Good Time	Ronald Bronstein and Benny Safdie
2017	Call Me by Your Name	Walter Fasano
2017	The Rider	Alex O'Flinn
2017	Get Out	Gregory Plotkin
2018	You Were Never Really Here	Joe Bini
2018	We the Animals	Keiko Deguchi, Brian A. Kates, and Jeremiah Zagar
2018	American Animals	Luke Dunkley, Nick Fenton, Chris Gill, and Julian Hart
2018	The Tale	Anne Fabini, Alex Hall, and Gary Levy
2018	Mid90s	Nick Houy
2019	Uncut Gems	Ronald Bronstein and Benny Safdie
2019	The Third Wife	Julie Béziau
2019	Sword of Trust	Tyler L. Cook
2019	The Lighthouse	Louise Ford
2019	Give Me Liberty	Kirill Mikhanovsky

=== 2020s ===
Year	Film	Recipient(s)
2020	Nomadland	Chloé Zhao
2020	The Invisible Man	Andy Canny
2020	Never Rarely Sometimes Always	Scott Cummings
2020	Residue	Merawi Gerima
2020	I Carry You with Me	Enat Sidi
2021	Zola	Joi McMillon
2021	A Chiara	Affonso Gonçalves
2021	The Nowhere Inn	Ali Greer
2021	The Novice	Lauren Hadaway and Nathan Nugent
2021	The Killing of Kenneth Chamberlain	Enrico Natale
2022	Everything Everywhere All at Once	Paul Rogers
2022	Marcel the Shell with Shoes On	Dean Fleischer Camp and Nick Paley
2022	The Cathedral	Ricky D'Ambrose
2022	Aftersun	Blair McClendon
2022	Tár	Monika Willi
2023	How to Blow Up a Pipeline	Daniel Garber
2023	Rotting in the Sun	Santiago Cendejas, Gabriel Díaz and Sofía Subercaseaux
2023	We Grown Now	Stephanie Filo
2023	Theater Camp	Jon Philpot
2023	Upon Entry	Emanuele Tiziani
2024	September 5	Hansjörg Weißbrich
2024	Jazzy	Laura Colwell and Vanara Taing
2024	The Apprentice	Olivier Bugge Coutté and Olivia Neergaard-Holm
2024	Nightbitch	Anne McCabe
2024	Dìdi	Arielle Zakowski
2025	The Testament of Ann Lee	Sofía Subercaseaux
2025	Eephus	Carson Lund
2025	Good Boy	Ben Leonberg
2025	Splitsville	Sara Shaw
2025	Warfare	Fin Oates

== See also ==
- BAFTA Award for Best Editing
- Academy Award for Best Film Editing
- Critics' Choice Movie Award for Best Editing
- American Cinema Editors Award for Best Edited Feature Film – Dramatic
- American Cinema Editors Award for Best Edited Feature Film – Comedy or Musical
