= Koudous Seihon =

Burkinabé actor

- Born: Burkina Faso
- Occupation: Actor
- Awards: 2015 Cairo International Film Festival; 2015 Stockholm Film Festival; 2015 Zurich Film Festival

Koudous Seihon is a Burkinabé actor best known for his roles in the Italian films Mediterranea and A Ciambra.

== Early life ==
While from Burkina Faso, Seihon eventually left the country to seek employment in Italy, where he worked as an orange picker and African community leader.

== Acting career ==
In 2015, Seihon was cast by Jonas Carpignano to star in Mediterranea, a role for which Seihon received numerous accolades. Two years later, Seihon garnered a major part in Carpiganon's second feature, A Ciambra. In 2021, Seihon played Ayiva in Carpignano's next film, the critically acclaimed A Chiara.

== Personal life ==
Siehon speaks several languages, including Italian, French, Arabic, Mossi, and Bissa.

== Filmography ==
Year	Title	Role	Notes	Ref.
2011	A Chjàna	Ayiva	short film	
2014	Young Lions of Gypsy	Koudous	short film	
2015	Mediterranea	Ayiva		
2017	A Ciambra	Ayiva		
2019	What You Don't Know About Me	Ikendu		
2020	Tolo Tolo	Papa di doudou		
2021	A Chiara	Ayiva		
2022	Freetown	Bikila	short film	
2024	Basileia	Key key		

== Awards and nominations ==
Year	Award	Category	Work	Result
2015	Cairo International Film Festival	Best Actor	Mediterranea	Won
2015	Stockholm Film Festival	Best Actor	Mediterranea	Won
2015	Zurich Film Festival	Special Mention	Mediterranea	Won
2016	Independent Spirit Awards	Best Male Lead	Mediterranea	Nominated
