= San Diego Film Critics Society Award for Best Cinematography =

Annual US film award

The San Diego Film Critics Society Award for Best Cinematography is an award given by the San Diego Film Critics Society to honor the finest directing achievements in filmmaking.

== Winners ==
=== 2000s ===
Year	Winner	Cinematographer(s)
2000	Gladiator	John Mathieson
2001	The Man Who Wasn't There	Roger Deakins
2002	Road to Perdition	Conrad L. Hall
2003	Girl with a Pearl Earring	Eduardo Serra
2004	Hero (Ying xiong)	Christopher Doyle
2004	The Phantom of the Opera	John Mathieson
2005	The New World	Emmanuel Lubezki
2006	The Illusionist	Dick Pope
2007	No Country for Old Men	Roger Deakins
2008	Slumdog Millionaire	Anthony Dod Mantle
2009	The Road	Javier Aguirresarobe

=== 2010s ===
Year	Winner	Cinematographer(s)
2010	Inception	Wally Pfister
2011	The Tree of Life	Emmanuel Lubezki
2012	Life of Pi	Claudio Miranda
2013	To the Wonder	Emmanuel Lubezki
2014	Nightcrawler	Robert Elswit
2015	Sicario	Roger Deakins
2016	Hell or High Water	Giles Nuttgens
2017	Dunkirk	Hoyte van Hoytema
2018	The Ballad of Buster Scruggs	Bruno Delbonnel
2018	The Rider	Joshua James Richards
2019	The Lighthouse	Jarin Blaschke

=== 2020s ===
Year	Winner	Cinematographer(s)
2020	Nomadland	Joshua James Richards
2021	The Tragedy of MacBeth	Bruno Delbonnel
2022	Babylon	Linus Sandgren
2023	Killers of the Flower Moon	Rodrigo Prieto
2024	Nosferatu	Jarin Blaschke
2025	Train Dreams	Adolpho Veloso
