= Josef Kubota Wladyka =

American Filmmaker

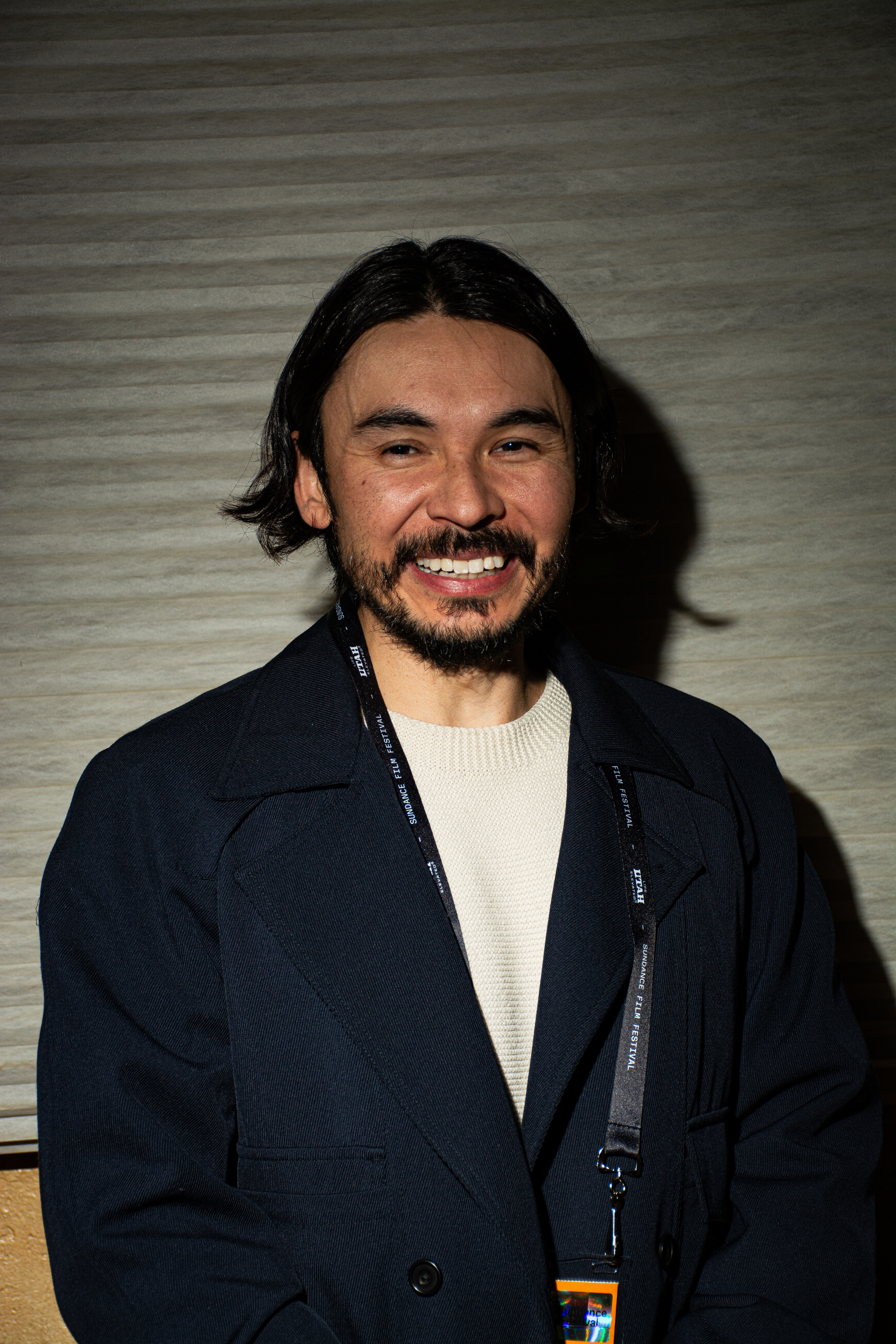
- Born: September 21, 1981 (age 45)
- Occupations: Film director; Screenwriter; Producer
- Years active: 2010-present

Josef Kubota Wladyka is an American film and television filmmaker, director, screenwriter and producer known for his work across independent cinema and episodic television. His projects often blend genre storytelling with social and cultural themes.

== Early life and education ==
Wladyka was born to a Japanese mother and a Polish father, the latter of whom had a strong interest in photography and film. He received a Master of Fine Arts degree from New York University.

== Career ==
In 2010, Wladyka was awarded the Spike Lee Fellowship, which provided mentorship and financial support for his feature directorial debut.

In July 2013, it was announced that Wladyka was in post-production on his feature film debut, Manos sucias (Dirty Hands), a U.S.–Colombian co-production filmed in Spanish. The film follows two Afro-Colombian fishermen forced to transport cocaine along Colombia’s Pacific coast, and was developed through a combination of U.S. and Colombian financing, including support from Film Independent, the San Francisco Film Society, and the Spike Lee Fellowship. In 2014, Wladyka won Best New Narrative Director at the Tribeca Film Festival for Manos sucias (Dirty Hands), which was later nominated for Best First Feature and Best Editing at the 2016 Film Independent Spirit Awards.

In 2018, Wladyka was selected to direct the premiere episode of the second season of AMC’s anthology series The Terror. The season, set during World War II, follows a supernatural presence affecting a Japanese American community from Southern California to internment camps and the Pacific theater. Wladyka's previous TV directing credits includes the third season of Netflix’s Narcos, AMC’s Fear the Walking Dead, TNT’s Animal Kingdom and Cinemax’s Outcast.

In 2021, Wladyka’s second feature film, Catch the Fair One, premiered at the Tribeca Film Festival. The film drew on Wladyka’s research into boxing culture and issues surrounding missing and trafficked Indigenous women, and was developed through close collaboration with Kali Reis, who made her screen debut in the lead role. Catch the Fair One won the Audience Award in the Narrative Future category at Tribeca and earned Reis a nomination for Best Actress at the Film Independent Spirit Awards.

In May 2025, Wladyka announced his third feature film, Ha-Chan, Shake Your Booty!, a fantasy dance drama set in Tokyo. The film stars Rinko Kikuchi alongside an international cast including Alberto Guerra, Alejandro Edda, and Yoh Yoshida. In December 2025, the film was announced as part of the lineup for the 2026 Sundance Film Festival.

== Filmography ==
Year	Film	Director	Writer	Producer
2014	Manos sucias (Dirty Hands)	Yes	Yes	Yes
2021	Catch the Fair One	Yes	Yes	Yes
2026	Ha-Chan, Shake Your Booty!	Yes	Yes	Yes
