= Affonso Gonçalves =

Brazilian film editor (born 1967)

- Born: 8 June 1967 (age 59); São Paulo, Brazil
- Education: London Film School; American Film Institute
- Occupation: Film editor
- Years active: 1992–present

Affonso Gonçalves (born 8 June 1967) is a Brazilian film editor. He is best known for editing many critically acclaimed films such as Winter's Bone (2010), Beasts of the Southern Wild (2012), Only Lovers Left Alive (2013), Carol (2015), Paterson (2016), and Wonderstruck (2017).

In 2014, Gonçalves was nominated for a Primetime Emmy Award for editing the episode "Who Goes There" in the first season of True Detective.

== Early life ==
Gonçalves was born in Brazil. He studied at the London International Film School for three years before studying at the American Film Institute for two and a half years.

== Career ==
Gonçalves first served as the assistant editor for Todd Solondz's Welcome to the Dollhouse (1995). Gonçalves is a frequent collaborator of Todd Haynes's, beginning with Mildred Pierce. Gonçalves was nominated for an American Cinema Editors award for Best Edited Miniseries or Motion Picture for Television. He edited Carol (2015) and received a nomination for a Satellite Award for Best Editing.

Gonçalves is also frequent collaborator of Jim Jarmusch, beginning on Only Lovers Left Alive (2013), and he served as the films editor and music editor. He also edited Paterson (2016) and Gimme Danger (2016).

Gonçalves received his first Primetime Emmy Nomination for Primetime Emmy Award for Outstanding Single-Camera Picture Editing for a Drama Series for his work on True Detective (2014). He won an American Cinema Editors award for Best Edited One-Hour Series for Non-Commercial Television.

In 2016, Gonçalves edited Little Men, directed by Ira Sachs.

In December 2021, he was nominated for an Independent Spirit Award for Best Editing for his work on A Chiara.

== Partial filmography ==
| Year | Title | Director |
|---|---|---|
| 1996 | The Delta | Ira Sachs |
| 1998 | The Adventures of Sebastian Cole | Tod Williams |
| 1998 | Trans | Julian Goldberger |
| 2004 | The Door in the Floor | Tod Williams |
| 2005 | Forty Shades of Blue | Ira Sachs |
| 2006 | The Hawk Is Dying | Julian Goldberger |
| 2007 | Married Life | Ira Sachs |
| 2010 | Night Catches Us | Tanya Hamilton |
| 2010 | Winter's Bone | Debra Granik |
| 2011 | Mildred Pierce | Todd Haynes |
| 2012 | Beasts of the Southern Wild | Benh Zeitlin |
| 2012 | Keep the Lights On | Ira Sachs |
| 2012 | Marfa Girl | Larry Clark |
| 2013 | Only Lovers Left Alive | Jim Jarmusch |
| 2014 | Love Is Strange | Ira Sachs |
| 2014 | True Detective | Cary Joji Fukunaga |
| 2015 | Carol | Todd Haynes |
| 2015 | Mediterranea | Jonas Carpignano |
| 2016 | Gimme Danger | Jim Jarmusch |
| 2016 | Paterson | Jim Jarmusch |
| 2016 | Little Men | Ira Sachs |
| 2017 | A Ciambra | Jonas Carpignano |
| 2017 | Wonderstruck | Todd Haynes |
| 2018 | Marfa Girl 2 | Larry Clark |
| 2019 | The Dead Don't Die | Jim Jarmusch |
| 2019 | Dark Waters | Todd Haynes |
| 2020 | Wendy | Benh Zeitlin |
| 2021 | The Velvet Underground | Todd Haynes |
| 2021 | A Chiara | Jonas Carpignano |
| 2021 | The Lost Daughter | Maggie Gyllenhaal |
| 2022 | Don't Worry Darling | Olivia Wilde |
| 2023 | May December | Todd Haynes |
| 2024 | I'm Still Here | Walter Salles |
| 2025 | Peter Hujar's Day | Ira Sachs |
| 2025 | Hamnet | Chloé Zhao |
| 2025 | Father Mother Sister Brother | Jim Jarmusch |
| 2026 | The Man I Love | Ira Sachs |
| 2026 | Flesh Impact | Maggie Gyllenhaal |
