= Ciambra =

Ciambra may refer to:

- A Ciambra, a 2017 Italian drama film
- Ciambra, a brand name of the drug pemetrexed
