= Blue Sun Palace =

2024 American drama film

- Theatrical release poster
- Directed by: Constance Tsang
- Written by: Constance Tsang
- Produced by: Sally Sujin Oh; Eli Raskin; Tony Yang
- Starring: Lee Kang-sheng; Wu Ke-xi; Haipeng Xu
- Cinematography: Norm Li
- Edited by: Caitlin Carr
- Music by: Sami Jano
- Production companies: Big Buddha Pictures; Field Trip Media
- Distributed by: Dekanalog
- Release dates: May 19, 2024 (Cannes); April 25, 2025 (United States)
- Running time: 116 minutes
- Country: United States
- Languages: English; Mandarin
- Box office: $83,125

Blue Sun Palace is a 2024 American drama film, written and directed by Constance Tsang in her directorial debut. It stars Lee Kang-sheng, Wu Ke-xi and Haipeng Xu.

It had its world premiere at the Cannes Film Festival on May 19, 2024, in the Critics' Week section. It was released on April 25, 2025, by Dekanalog.

== Premise ==
An unexpected bond forms between two migrants in the Chinese community of Queens, New York, in the aftermath of a tragedy.

== Cast ==
- Lee Kang-sheng as Cheung
- Wu Ke-xi as Amy
- Haipeng Xu as Didi

== Release ==
Its world premiere was at the Cannes Film Festival on May 19, 2024. In September 2024, Dekanalog acquired U.S. distribution rights to the film. It was released on April 25, 2025.

== Reception ==
=== Critical response ===
On the review aggregator website Rotten Tomatoes, 100% of 23 critics' reviews are positive, with an average rating of 7.5/10. Metacritic, which uses a weighted average, assigned the film a score of 83 out of 100, based on nine critics, indicating "universal acclaim".

Alissa Simon of Variety wrote, "More akin to European art films than to American indies, Palace prioritizes mood over plot. Tsang allows her experienced actors plenty of breathing space to convey the melancholy of their existence in situations where dreams are more likely to be deferred than to come true, but are necessary nevertheless."

Tomris Laffly of RogerEbert.com gave the film three and a half out of four stars, writing, "Tsang has made a small, affecting, and studiously minimalist film here, with lived-in and tactile visual and design elements signaling a major auteur in the making. In a lot of ways, her film brings to mind Take Out, a stunning early Sean Baker movie about a Chinese immigrant working as a deliveryman. Inspired by her and her family's own past as immigrants, Tsang's poignant Blue Sun Palace is anchored in a similar kind of empathy, one that lingers and grows long after the film's aching end credits appear."

=== Accolades ===
Year	Award	Category	Nominee	Result	Ref.
2024	45th Cairo International Film Festival	Best Actor	Lee Kang-sheng	Won	
2024	45th Cairo International Film Festival	Golden Pyramid Award	Blue Sun Palace	Nominated	
2025	49th Hong Kong International Film Festival	Firebird Awards (Young Cinema Competition (Chinese-language))	Blue Sun Palace	Nominated	
2025	49th Hong Kong International Film Festival	Best Actress (Firebird Awards, Chinese-language)	Wu Ke-xi, Haipeng Xu	Won	
2026	41st Independent Spirit Awards	Best First Feature	Constance Tsang, Sally Sujin Oh, Eli Raskin, and Tony Yang	Nominated	
2026	41st Independent Spirit Awards	Best First Screenplay	Constance Tsang	Nominated	
2026	41st Independent Spirit Awards	Best Supporting Performance	Haipeng Xu	Nominated	
2026	41st Independent Spirit Awards	Best Cinematography	Norm Li	Nominated	
