= Tony Yang (film producer) =

American film producer

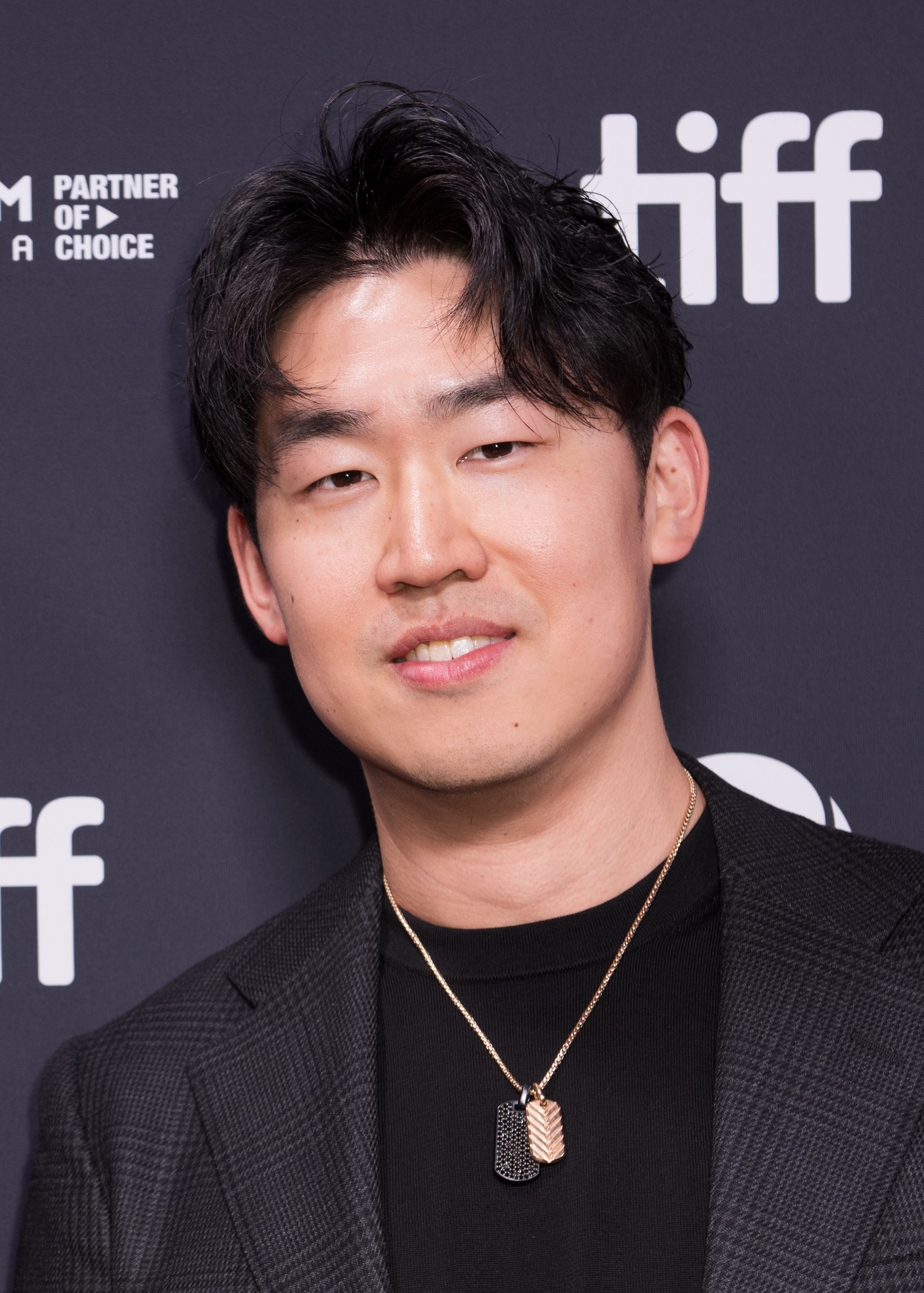
- Yang at the 2025 Toronto International Film Festival
- Education: Columbia University
- Occupation: Film producer
- Known for: Lucky Lu, Blue Sun Palace

Tony Yang (Chinese: 楊劼) is an American film producer known for producing Lucky Lu (2025), directed by Lloyd Lee Choi, and Blue Sun Palace (2024), directed by Constance Tsang, both of which premiered at the Cannes Film Festival.

Yang was part of Variety's list of 10 producers to watch in 2025.

== Career ==
Yang originally was a pre-med student in college, but switched in his junior year to film. He then attended Columbia University for his master's degree in creative film production. At his time of graduation, he had helped produce 50 shorts.

In 2023 he was selected for the Sundance Institute's producers' lab for the project Let The Sleepers Lie.

In addition to Lucky Lu and Blue Sun Palace, Yang was an executive producer of the 2025 film Bunnylovr.
