= Catch the Fair One =

- Theatrical release poster
- Directed by: Josef Kubota Wladyka
- Screenplay by: Josef Kubota Wladyka
- Story by: Kali Reis; Josef Kubota Wladyka
- Produced by: Mollye Asher; Kimberly Parker; Josef Kubota Wladyka
- Starring: Kali Reis; Daniel Henshall; Tiffany Chu; Michael Drayer; Lisa Emery; Kimberly Guerrero; Kevin Dunn
- Cinematography: Ross Giardina
- Edited by: Benjamin Rodriguez
- Music by: Nathan Halpern
- Production companies: The Population; Protozoa Pictures; Firstgen Content
- Distributed by: IFC Films
- Release dates: June 12, 2021 (Tribeca); February 11, 2022 (United States)
- Running time: 85 minutes
- Country: United States
- Language: English
- Box office: $35,210

Catch the Fair One is a 2021 American thriller film written, directed, and produced by Josef Kubota Wladyka, based on a story by Wladyka and Kali Reis. It stars Reis in her film debut, along with Daniel Henshall, Tiffany Chu, Michael Drayer, Lisa Emery, Kimberly Guerrero, and Kevin Dunn.

The plot follows a young American Indian woman and former boxer named Kaylee who voluntarily joins a sex trafficking ring to find her missing younger sister. The film premiered at the Tribeca Film Festival on June 12, 2021. It was released in the United States on February 11, 2022, by IFC Films. The film was met with critical acclaim, with praise aimed towards the story and performances. At the 37th Independent Spirit Awards, Reis received a nomination for Best Female Lead.

== Plot ==
Kaylee, an American Indian woman and former professional boxer, is now a drug addict living in a women's shelter and working as a waitress. Some time ago, Kaylee's younger sister Weeta was abducted and forced into prostitution by a sex trafficking ring. She is one of the hundreds of young girls who go missing every year. No one has heard of her since, and Kaylee has since been forced to conduct her own search as the authorities show no interest.

After finding a lead on Weeta's whereabouts, Kaylee meets the procurer of a local trafficking ring and convinces him she is desperately in need of money. The man takes pictures, gives her drugs, and masturbates while watching her undress before agreeing to contact a buyer looking for a "Native girl".

Bobby is the son of the ring's kingpin, Willie. Kaylee is chloroformed, tied up, and taken by Bobby to the buyer's home. She wakes up alone in a basement and using a razor blade hidden under her tongue, she cuts herself free. Once Bobby and the buyer arrive, Bobby explains that he knows what she is trying to do and that she will never find her sister. When he leaves the room, and the buyer prepares to rape her, Kaylee pulls out the razor blade, kills the buyer, and runs away. Willie and his crew arrive to get rid of the dead body. Kaylee returns to the house and hides in Bobby's car. She sees Willie hit Bobby and order him to leave.

Bobby goes home to his wife Linda (who has a black eye) and son Junior. When he leaves the room, Kaylee enters the house and ties his family up, putting tape over their mouths to stop them from screaming. Bobby returns and a fight ensues, with Kaylee using her expertise as a boxer to gain the upper hand. After tying him up, Kaylee demands information about her sister, but he refuses to answer. She stabs him in the leg, threatens to cut off Linda's ear, and begins to waterboard him. Bobby refuses to betray his father out of fear and allows himself to drown.

Kaylee interrogates Linda and learns that Willie owns a train yard where he will transport the next "batch" of kidnapped girls. Kaylee arrives at the train yard with only Bobby's gun in her possession. At gunpoint, one of Willie's truck drivers tells her that the girls are in a nearby warehouse. She finds them and tells them to escape when the procurer from before spots her. He runs away and Kaylee shoots him several times. She questions him but he begins to apologize and beg instead. Kaylee walks away, letting the procurer bleed to death. Kaylee reveals that she has hidden Linda and Junior in her car. She orders Linda to take her to Willie, who lives in a mansion.

Inside the house, Linda is greeted by Willie's wife Debra, who says Willie is in the library. She mentions that Linda regularly visited them every time Bobby became aggressive. In the bathroom, Linda messages Kaylee with the correct information about where Willie is but also calls 9-1-1 before leaving. Kaylee holds Willie at gunpoint and asks about Weeta. Debra barges into the room with a gun and accidentally shoots Willie in the face. Kaylee shoots and kills Debra as Debra shoots again, fatally wounding Kaylee in the stomach. In her final moments, Kaylee imagines what her life would have been if she had succeeded, as she envisions herself entering her comeback boxing match.

== Cast ==
- Kali Reis as Kaylee
- Daniel Henshall as Bobby
- Tiffany Chu as Linda
- Michael Drayer as Danny
- Lisa Emery as Debra
- Kimberly Guerrero as Jaya
- Kevin Dunn as Willie
- Isabelle Chester as Lisa
- Sam Seward as Jeremiah
- Mainaku Borrero as Weeta
- Wesley Leung as Bobby Jr.

== Production ==
Catch the Fair One was shot in Buffalo, New York, with Ross Giardina serving as cinematographer. The film was executive produced by Darren Aronofsky. It is the acting debut of professional boxer Kali Reis, who is active in the Missing and Murdered Indigenous Women (MMWIG) movement. The film is dedicated to sound mixer Michael Wolf Snyder, who died by suicide at the age of 35.

== Release ==
The film had its world premiere at the Tribeca Film Festival on June 12, 2021 where it was awarded the Audience Award. By the end of its run, the film screened at festivals in Deauville, Jerusalem, San Diego, Warsaw, and Woodstock. In August 2021, IFC Films bought the film's distribution rights. The film was released in the United States on February 11, 2022. In April 2022, IFC Films signed an output deal with AMC+. The film is set to be released on the streaming service on May 13, 2022.

== Reception ==
=== Box office ===
In the United States and Canada, the film earned $7,992 from thirty theaters in its opening weekend. It made $8,625 from eight theaters in its second weekend, $6,397 from three theaters in its third, $295 from one theater in its fourth, $244 from two theaters in its fifth, and $210 from two theaters in its sixth. Overall, it made $35,210.

=== Critical response ===
On the review aggregator website Rotten Tomatoes, 93% of 67 critics' reviews are positive, with an average rating of 7.3/10. The website's consensus reads: "A serious-minded drama that's also a propulsive thriller, Catch the Fair One anchors its powerful performances in real-life horror." Metacritic, which uses a weighted average, assigned the film a score of 71 out of 100, based on 16 critics, indicating "generally favorable" reviews.

Screen Rant's Mae Abdulbaki said the film was "strongest in action mode". Nick Schager of The Daily Beast praised the film for its "portrait of white men exploiting Native American women for profit and sexual gratification", adding that "[it] isn't lost on the film..." David Ehrlich from IndieWire said "[t]here isn't much for Catch the Fair One to find at the end of the line, but it looks for its invisible women - indigenous and otherwise - with the urgency of someone who knows what seeing them would actually mean".

=== Accolades ===
Catch the Fair One competed for Best Film at festivals in Deauville, and Warsaw, and won the award at the Sidewalk and Tribeca Film Festivals. Reis won Best Actress at the Newport Beach Film Festival, and received a nomination in the same category at the 37th Independent Spirit Awards.
