= Ha-Chan, Shake Your Booty! =

2026 comedy drama film by Josef Kubota Wladyka

- Theatrical release poster
- Directed by: Josef Kubota Wladyka
- Written by: Josef Kubota Wladyka; Nicholas Huynh
- Produced by: Josef Kubota Wladyka; Mao Nagakura; Kimberly Parker Zox
- Starring: Rinko Kikuchi; Alberto Guerra; Alejandro Edda; You; Yoh Yoshida; Damián Alcázar
- Cinematography: Daniel Satinoff
- Edited by: Benjamin Rodriguez, Jr.
- Music by: Nathan Halpern
- Production company: JDM Pictures
- Distributed by: Sony Pictures Classics
- Release dates: January 22, 2026 (Sundance); September 25, 2026 (United States)
- Running time: 122 minutes
- Country: United States
- Languages: Japanese; English; Spanish
- Box office: $417,646

Ha-Chan, Shake Your Booty! is a 2026 American comedy drama film directed by Josef Kubota Wladyka and written by Wladyka and Nicholas Huynh. It stars Rinko Kikuchi, Alberto Guerra, Alejandro Edda, You, Yoh Yoshida, and Damián Alcázar.

The film marks a stylistic departure for Wladyka, moving from the gritty thrillers of his previous work into a music-driven character study. It premiered in the U.S. Dramatic Competition at the 2026 Sundance Film Festival, where it won the Directing Award Dramatic, and it was theatrically released in the United States on September 25, 2026. Rinko Kikuchi's performance was singled out for critical praise.

== Plot ==
Haru and Luis are a happily married couple who love to dance in the Tokyo ballroom and Latin dance scene. After Luis dies from a heart attack, Haru withdraws into isolation. Nine months later, she regularly fantasizes about Luis visiting her around the house, dressed in a giant black bird costume. Her sister Yuki and her friend Hiromi convince her to return to the dance studio. She develops a crush on a new instructor named Fedir, who, like her deceased husband, is Latin American. Fedir is in an open marriage with another professional dancer, Mila, who lives in Paris.

Haru asks Fedir to dinner, and tells him that she and her husband also have an open marriage. That night, they sleep together. She leaves quickly, but asks Fedir on another date to see a theatrical production of Dirty Dancing. After the show, she invites him to her house. Haru imagines Fedir and Luis drinking together, listening to records, and eventually kissing. Her friends are happy to see her new zest for life.

At a studio Halloween party, Haru (dressed in Day of the Dead makeup) is surprised to meet Mila, who is visiting from Paris. At the end of the evening, she pours a glass of wine on Mila's head, causing a scene. Haru tells her friends that she slept with Fedir. The next day, she waits outside Fedir and Mila's apartment; he tells her that he knows she lied about her husband, and that his priority is Mila. Haru tries to apologize to Mila and offers her a gift, which Mila refuses to accept. Angry, Haru breaks into their apartment intending to leave the gift, and also vandalizes some of Mila's belongings. When Fedir and Mila return, she hides under the bed, where she hears them discuss Fedir's relationship with her before having sex. Haru tries to sneak out while the couple are asleep, but is caught and spends the night in jail. Her sister bails her out the next morning. That night, still in her skeletal makeup, Haru imagines slow dancing with Luis, and then helping him back into his giant black bird costume. She ignites the black bird, and it takes off into the sky like a firework.

In an epilogue, Haru and her friends commemorate the first anniversary of Luis's death, burning incense at his altar. She sees Fedir briefly across the tracks at a train station, and they wave to one another. On the train, Haru listens to "Dreams" and begins to dance joyously.

== Cast ==
- Rinko Kikuchi as Haru
- Alberto Guerra as Fedir
- Alejandro Edda as Luis
- You as Hiromi
- Yoh Yoshida as Yuki
- Damián Alcázar as Jacobo
- Keren Louis as Mila
- Charley Flyte as Sasha

== Production ==
The film is directed by Josef Kubota Wladyka, who previously collaborated with lead actress Rinko Kikuchi on the Max series Tokyo Vice, where he directed episodes and she starred as Emi Maruyama. Wladyka also serves as a producer alongside Kimberly Parker Zox and Mao Nagakura.

The project highlights a unique cultural intersection, featuring a Japanese lead cast alongside prominent Latin American actors Alberto Guerra and Damián Alcázar. The film features dialogue shifts between Japanese, English, and Spanish.

== Release ==
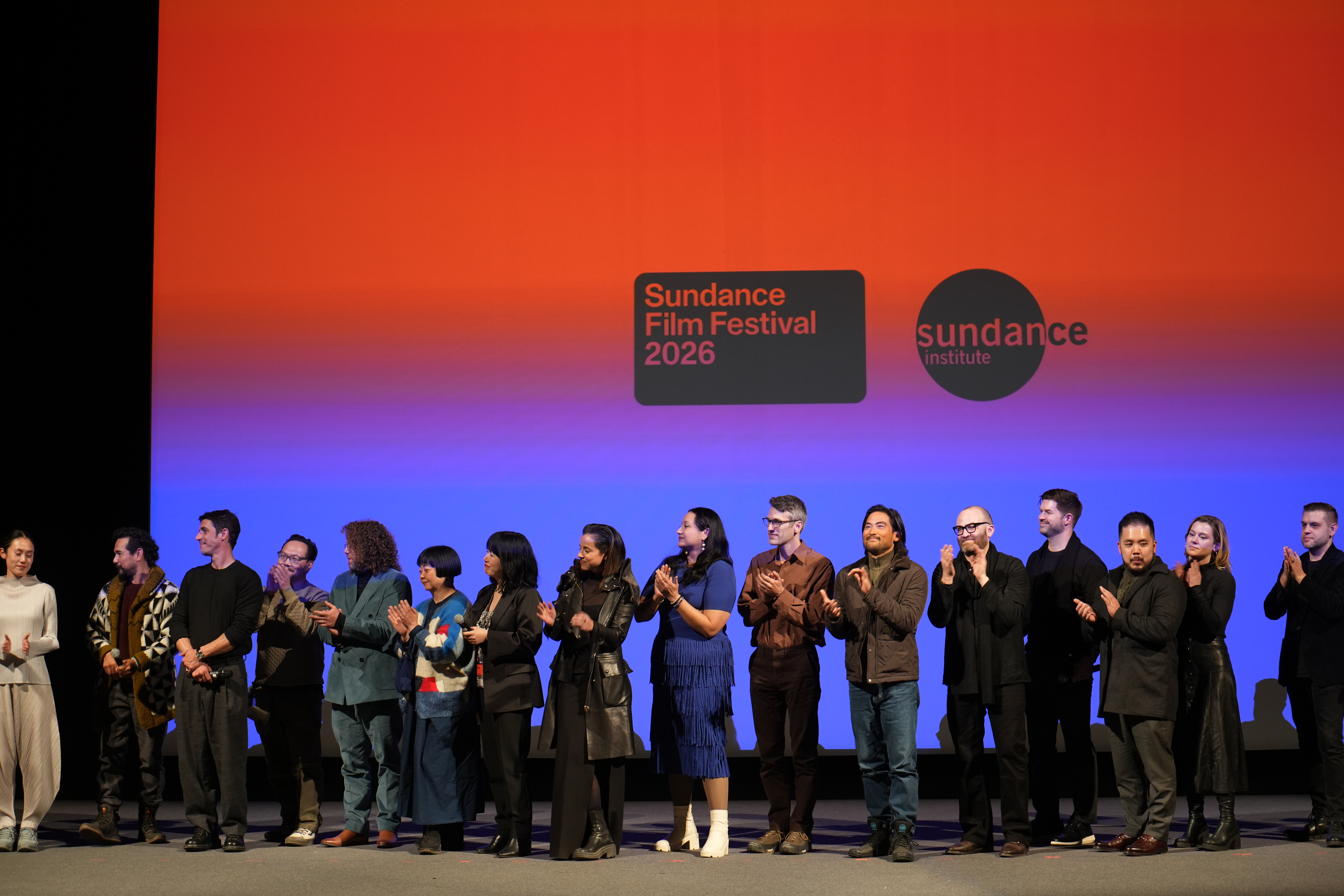
Cast and crew of Ha Chan, Shake Your Booty! at its premiere at the 2026 Sundance Film Festival Premiere

Ha-Chan, Shake Your Booty! premiered at the Sundance Film Festival on January 22, 2026, where it won the Directing Award Dramatic. A week later, Sony Pictures Classics acquired distribution rights to the film. The film was released in the United States on September 25, 2026.

== Reception ==
On the review aggregator website Rotten Tomatoes, 91% of 85 critics' reviews are positive, with an average rating of 7.3/10. The website's consensus reads: "A lively exorcism of grief, Ha-Chan, Shake Your Booty! gives its characters a lovely sense of grace while Rinko Kikuchi's winsome performance gives this film its beating heart."

Critics broadly praised the film's visual style and its handling of grief. Taylor Gates of Collider called it "the dance party we need," highlighting the film's vibrant color palette and stylish energy. Blake Simons of The Film Stage wrote that the film "feels nothing short of revelatory." Caryn James of The Hollywood Reporter described it as "a surprisingly buoyant, unsentimental film about grief," noting the shifts between comedy, poignant emotion, and surrealism that echo the film's trilingual dialogue.

Several critics singled out Rinko Kikuchi's performance. Kate Erbland of IndieWire praised her "lovely performance," while Patrick Gibbs of Slug Magazine suggested Kikuchi could be "a dark horse Oscar contender." Katie Rife of The Wrap noted the personal dimension of the project, observing that "the director's heartfelt affection for his mom permeates the film."

Other reviewers focused on the film's musical set pieces. Glenn Garner of Deadline highlighted a train-set dance sequence using practical effects, and Johnny Oleksinski of the New York Post called it a "delirious gem" full of "joyous company numbers." Dillon Gonzales of Geek Vibes Nation and Rebecca Sharp of Filmotomy both pointed to the film's blending of magical realism with grounded emotional drama.

=== Accolades ===
Award	Date of ceremony	Category	Recipient(s)	Result	Ref.
Sundance Film Festival	2026	Directing Award: U.S. Dramatic	Josef Kubota Wladyka	Won	
Sundance Film Festival	2026	Grand Jury Prize: U.S. Dramatic	Ha-Chan Shake Your Booty!	Nominated	
