= Mollye Asher =

American film producer

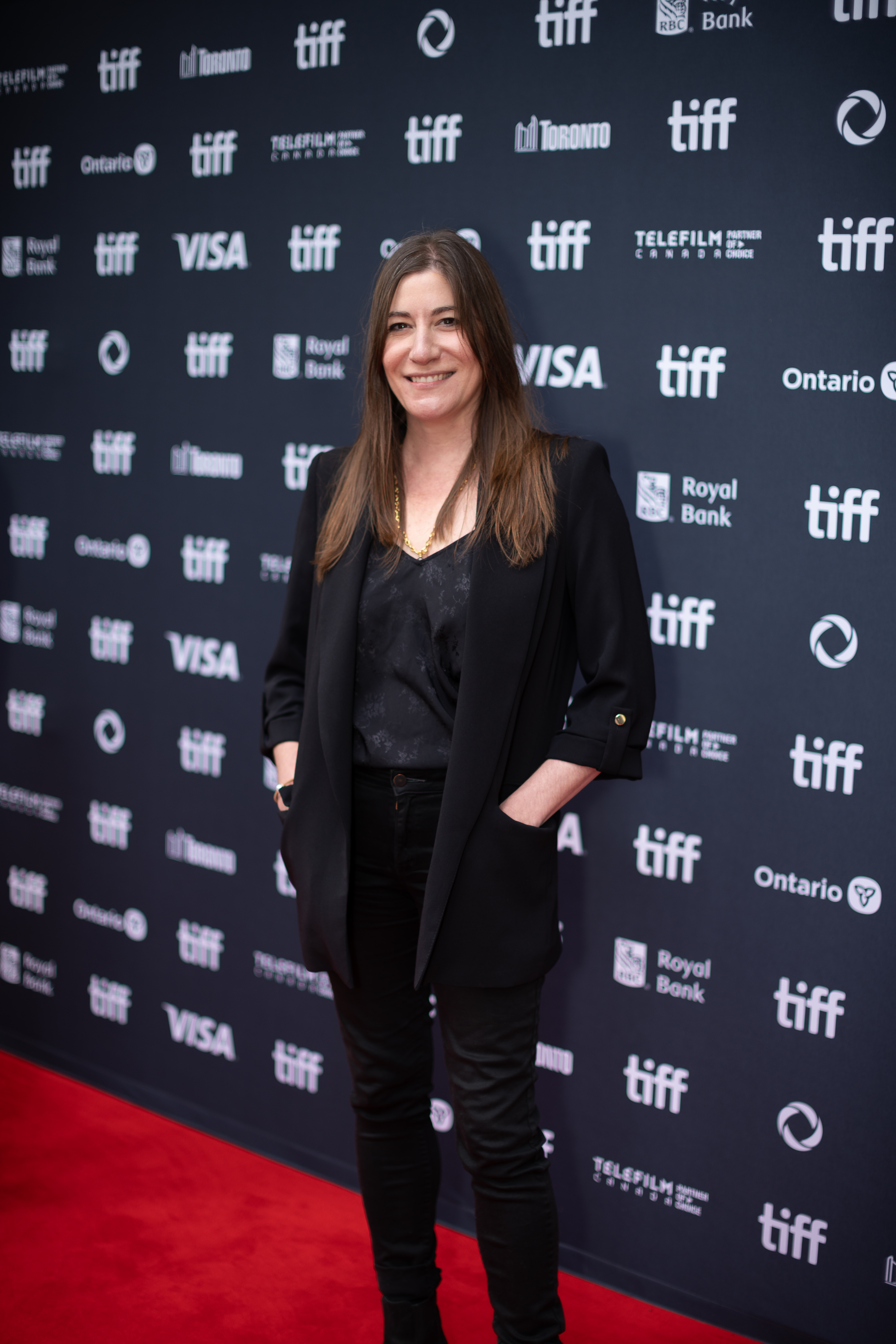
- Asher at the Toronto Film Festival in 2024
- Born: Mollye Mirowitz; 22 November; Miami, Florida, US
- Occupation: Film production
- Years active: 2005–present
- Known for: Nomadland

Mollye Asher is an American film producer, director, writer and editor. She is best known for producing the drama film Nomadland, which was nominated for six Oscars at the 93rd Academy Awards, and won three -- Best Picture, Best Director and Best Actress, with Asher winning Best Picture.

== Early life and education ==
Asher grew up in Miami, Florida. She has two sisters. In an interview, Asher said that she was raised in a family with "very strong political views" who would often talk about the news around the dinner table. Originally Asher intended to be a singer, undergoing classical vocal training at the New World School of the Arts in Miami, then continuing to New York University's Tisch School of the Arts to pursue a career in musical theater. However, while there she discovered a love for acting and film, earning a BA in drama and an MFA in Film.

== Career ==
Asher has professionally partnered with director Chloé Zhao on three films: Songs My Brothers Taught Me, The Rider, and Nomadland. For producing Nomadland, Asher received the Academy Award for Best Picture.

Asher is a member of the Academy of Motion Pictures.

== Filmography ==
- 25 Missed Calls (short) (2008)
- Angel Jellyfish (short) (2008)
- Tapeworms (short) (2009)
- The Ride (short) (2009)
- Klaudia (short) (2009)
- Her Seat is Vacant (short) (2011)
- Little Horses (short) (2011)
- Little Ones (short) (2011)
- Faith, Love + Whiskey (2012)
- Bottled (short) (2012)
- And Winter Slow (short) (2012)
- Salt Water Fruit (short, co-producer) (2012)
- Across Grace Alley (short, line producer) (2013)
- She's Lost Control (2014)
- Fort Tilden (2014)
- Christmas Wedding Baby (co-producer) (2014)
- Songs My Brothers Taught Me (2015)
- Unsettled Matter (short) (2015)
- Blackwell (short) (2015)
- The Rider (2017)
- Hunting Season (associate producer) (2017)
- Tooth and Nail (short) (2017)
- The Amaranth (2018)
- Swallow (2019)
- Nomadland (2020)
- Catch the Fair One (2021)
- Somewhere Quiet (executive producer) (2023)
- On Swift Horses (2024)

== Personal life ==
Asher lives in New York City. She is married to filmmaker Ed Barnes.
