= The Rider (film) =

2017 film by Chloé Zhao

- Theatrical release poster
- Directed by: Chloé Zhao
- Written by: Chloé Zhao
- Produced by: Chloé Zhao; Mollye Asher; Bert Hamelinck; Sacha Ben Harroche
- Starring: Brady Jandreau; Lilly Jandreau; Tim Jandreau; Lane Scott; Cat Clifford
- Cinematography: Joshua James Richards
- Edited by: Alex O'Flinn
- Music by: Nathan Halpern
- Production companies: Caviar; Highwayman Films
- Distributed by: Sony Pictures Classics
- Release dates: May 20, 2017 (Cannes); April 13, 2018 (United States)
- Running time: 105 minutes
- Country: United States
- Language: English
- Budget: $130,000
- Box office: $4.2 million

The Rider is a 2017 American contemporary western film written, produced and directed by Chloé Zhao. The film stars Brady Jandreau, Lilly Jandreau, Tim Jandreau, Lane Scott, and Cat Clifford and was shot in the Badlands of South Dakota. It premiered in the Directors' Fortnight section at the Cannes Film Festival on May 20, 2017, where it won the Art Cinema Award. It was released in theaters in the United States on April 13, 2018. It grossed $4.2 million and was critically praised for its story, performances, and the depiction of the people and events that influenced the film.

== Plot ==
All the characters are Lakota Sioux of the Pine Ridge Reservation in South Dakota. Brady lives in poverty with his father Wayne and his autistic teenaged sister, Lilly. Once a rising rodeo star, Brady suffered brain damage from a rodeo accident, weakening his right hand and leaving him prone to seizures. Doctors have told him that riding will make them worse.

Brady regularly visits his friend, Lane, who lives in a care facility after suffering brain damage from a similar accident. Brady's father does little for the family, spending their income on drinking and gambling. Once, to fund their trailer, he sells their horse, Gus, infuriating Brady.

Brady takes a job in a local grocery store to raise money for the family. He also makes some money breaking in horses. With his savings, he intends to buy another horse, specifically a temperamental horse named Apollo, but his father actually buys it for him and Brady bonds with it, as he had with Gus. However, his riding and refusal to rest cause him to have a near-fatal seizure. Doctors warn him that more riding could be fatal. Upon returning home, Brady finds that his horse has had an accident, permanently injuring a leg. Knowing that the horse will never be able to be ridden ever again, and not being able to bring himself to put his own horse down, he must have his father to do it for him.

After an argument with his father, Brady decides to take part in a rodeo competition, despite the doctors' warnings. At the competition, just before he competes, he sees his family watching him. He finally decides to walk away from the competition and life as a rodeo rider.

== Cast ==
The cast of the movie consists entirely of non-professional Lakota actors from the Pine Ridge Reservation playing fictionalized versions of themselves, including Jandreau's father and sister, and several of his friends.

- Brady Jandreau as Brady Blackburn
- Tim Jandreau as Wayne Blackburn
- Lilly Jandreau as Lilly Blackburn
- Cat Clifford as Cat Clifford
- Terri Dawn Pourier as Terri Dawn Pourier
- Lane Scott as Lane Scott
- Tanner Langdeau as Tanner Langdeau
- James Calhoon as James Calhoon

== Production ==
Zhao first met horse trainer Brady Jandreau in July 2014 during a return visit to the Pine Ridge Reservation where Zhao had shot her first film, Songs My Brother Taught Me. Zhao was immediately drawn to Jandreau as an actor and decided to write a script for him: "I felt like he could be a movie star, like I had discovered a young Heath Ledger or something." Seeing him train a horse she thought, “If he can manipulate the emotions of a horse, maybe he can manipulate an audience. Maybe he can act.” Zhao said, “Right away, I called [Richards] and said, 'I think I met someone who can carry a movie.' The way he trains horses was what convinced me the most. To see him act like a father, like a mother, like a friend, like a dance partner to a wild animal and get that animal to trust him — I figured maybe he could do that for the camera as well.” One scene in the film documents Jandreau taming a horse in real-time.

Zhao wrote a few stories for Jandreau after meeting him in 2014, but felt none of them worked. The film is loosely based on Jandreau's real-life injury on April 1, 2016 when a bucking horse stepped on his head, cutting a three-inch, knuckle-deep gash in Jandreau's skull, grinding manure and sand into his brain and causing Jandreau to go into a seizure. Jandreau was put into an induced coma for three days and underwent surgery at the hospital; the beginning of the movie is influenced by Jandreau's "crazy-ass dreams" of a horse cloaked in shadow during this time. The film contains footage of Jandreau's accident, and shows the scar in his head in multiple scenes. Jandreau's injury and recovery affected the message Zhao wanted the film to convey: "I wished that Brady would see hope in his life after the rodeo, which inspired me to take his character in that direction." Zhao began by writing a treatment, incorporating lines said to her by Jandreau and others in their time together, including the line that made her decide to make the film: "If any animals around here got hurt like I did, they would get put down."

After the struggles she had developing and financing her first film, Zhao decided to "start with nothing and then just do something real cheap. And do it right away because I can't do the development thing anymore." Zhao decided to make the film in August 2016 and started shooting in September. Zhao covered the film's production costs herself, using her and her then boyfriend Joshua James Richards' credit cards. There were only six crew members, including Zhao, and they relied on natural light and Walmart LED strips for lighting (Zhao says she will "shoot every magic hour if I am alive"). Filming took place at local horse sales, rodeos, and auctions for free, incorporating "all these extras, who are perfectly costumed, all these old cowboys – you couldn't have cast and staged this." The cast consists entirely of non-professional Lakota actors from the Pine Ridge Reservation playing fictionalized versions of themselves, including Jandreau, who grew up riding and training horses, as well as his father, sister, wife, and several of his friends.

Jandreau's childhood best friend, Lane Scott, also features in the movie. Scott became disabled in a car accident four years before filming, and had messaged Zhao about the film on Facebook. Zhao had not met Scott until the night of filming, and was unsure of how far she could push him. Jandreau assured Zhao that Scott would want to do it, so they drove eight hours to the rehabilitation center Scott had been moved to in Omaha. It was Jandreau's first time seeing Scott at the rehabilitation center and the first time Scott had seen Jandreau since Jandreau's injury. They filmed for four hours at the rehabilitation center, and Scott "loved that because he was being treated like he was doing a job, not as someone who’s disabled." A documentary crew had been preparing to make a feature documentary about Scott before his accident, but pulled out after he was injured. Zhao said this was "so silly, because that's where the story starts".

Zhao spent the first few months after filming wrapped editing the 50 hours of footage captured, finishing the first cut of the film herself.

== Release ==
Sony Pictures Classics acquired the distribution rights to The Rider in North and Latin America, Asia, Australia, New Zealand and Eastern Europe two days following its premiere at the 2017 Cannes Film Festival.

== Reception ==
=== Box office ===
The Rider grossed $2.4 million in the United States and Canada, and $1.7 million in other territories, for a worldwide total of $4.2 million.

=== Critical response ===
On review aggregator Rotten Tomatoes, the film holds an approval rating of 97% based on 191 reviews, and an average rating of 8.40/10. The website's critical consensus reads, "The Rider's hard-hitting drama is only made more effective through writer-director Chloé Zhao's use of untrained actors to tell the movie's fact-based tale." On Metacritic, the film has a weighted average score of 89 out of 100, based on 42 critics, indicating "universal acclaim".

Godfrey Cheshire of RogerEbert.com gave the film 4 out of 4 stars, writing that its "style, its sense of light and landscape and mood, simultaneously give it the mesmerizing force of the most confident cinematic poetry."

Former United States President Barack Obama listed The Rider among his favorite films of 2018, in his annual list of favorite films.

=== Top ten lists ===
The Rider was listed on numerous critics' top ten lists for 2018.

- 1st – Michael Phillips, Chicago Tribune
- 1st – Alison Willmore, BuzzFeed
- 1st – Randy Myers, San Jose Mercury News
- 1st – Peter Debruge, Variety
- 2nd – Godfrey Cheshire, RogerEbert.com
- 3rd – Stephen Farber, The Hollywood Reporter
- 3rd – Owen Gleiberman, Variety
- 3rd – Ann Hornaday, The Washington Post
- 4th – David Edelstein, New York Magazine
- 4th – Nick Schager, Esquire
- 5th – Matt Singer, ScreenCrush
- 5th-- Emanuel Levy, EmanuelLevy.com
- 6th – Seongyong Cho & Sheila O'Malley, RogerEbert.com
- 6th – Emily Yoshida, New York Magazine
- 6th – Marlow Stern, The Daily Beast
- 7th – Jake Coyle, Associated Press
- 7th – David Fear, Rolling Stone
- 7th – Todd McCarthy, The Hollywood Reporter
- 7th – Justin Chang, Los Angeles Times
- 7th – Nicholas Barber, BBC
- 8th – Donald Clarke & Tara Brady, The Irish Times
- 8th – Scott Tobias, Filmspotting
- 9th – Christopher Orr, The Atlantic
- 10th – Philip Martin, Arkansas Democrat-Gazette
- 10th – Sara Stewart, New York Post
- Top 10 (listed alphabetically) – Gary Thompson, Philadelphia Daily News
- Top 10 (listed alphabetically) – Moira Macdonald, Seattle Times
- Top 10 (listed alphabetically) – James Verniere, Boston Herald
- Best of 2018 (listed alphabetically, not ranked) – Gary M. Kramer, Salon.com
- Best of 2018 (listed alphabetically, not ranked), NPR
- Best of 2018 (listed alphabetically, not ranked) – Ty Burr, The Boston Globe

=== Accolades ===
Award	Date of ceremony	Category	Recipients	Result	Ref.
Film Independent Spirit Awards	March 3, 2018	Best Feature	Mollye Asher, Sacha Ben Harroche, Bert Hamelinck and Chloé Zhao	Nominated	
Film Independent Spirit Awards	March 3, 2018	Best Director	Chloé Zhao	Nominated	
Film Independent Spirit Awards	March 3, 2018	Best Editing	Alex O'Flinn	Nominated	
Film Independent Spirit Awards	March 3, 2018	Best Cinematography	Joshua James Richards	Nominated	
Gotham Independent Film Award	November 26, 2018	Best Feature	The Rider	Won	
Gotham Independent Film Award	November 26, 2018	Audience Award	The Rider	Nominated	
British Independent Film Awards	December 8, 2018	Best Foreign Independent Film	Chloé Zhao, Mollye Asher, Sacha Ben Harroche and Bert Hamelinck	Nominated	
National Board of Review	January 8, 2019	Top Ten Independent Films	The Rider	Won	
National Society of Film Critics	January 5, 2019	Best Picture	The Rider	Won	
National Society of Film Critics	January 5, 2019	Best Director	Chloé Zhao	Nominated	

== See also ==
- List of films about horses
