= A Ciambra =

2017 film

- Film poster
- Directed by: Jonas Carpignano
- Written by: Jonas Carpignano
- Produced by: Paolo Carpignano; Jon Coplon; Christoph Daniel; Gwyn Sannia; Marc Schmidheiny; Rodrigo Teixeira; Ryan Zacarias
- Starring: Pio Amato
- Cinematography: Tim Curtin
- Edited by: Affonso Gonçalves
- Music by: Dan Romer
- Production companies: Stayblack; RT Features; Rai Cinema; Sikelia Productions
- Distributed by: Academy Two
- Release dates: 19 May 2017 (Cannes); 31 August 2017 (Italy)
- Running time: 120 minutes
- Country: Italy
- Language: Italian
- Box office: $91,846

A Ciambra (Italian: [a tˈtʃambra]) is a 2017 Italian drama film directed by Jonas Carpignano. It is the second in the director's trilogy set in a Calabrian town, following Mediterranea (2015) and followed by A Chiara (2021).

Although selected as the Italian entry for the Best Foreign Language Film at the 90th Academy Awards, it was not nominated.

== Plot ==
Fourteen-year-old Pio Amato idolizes his older brother in their small Romani community in Calabria. Challenges mount after his older brother disappears.

== Cast ==
- Pio Amato as Pio Amato
- Koudous Seihon as Ayiva
- Damiano Amato as Cosimo

== Production ==
A Ciambra is the second in the director's trilogy set in a Calabrian town, following Mediterranea (2015) and followed by A Chiara (2021).

== Release ==
A Ciambra was screened in the Directors' Fortnight section at the 2017 Cannes Film Festival. At Cannes in won the Europa Cinemas Label Award. It was selected as the Italian entry for the Best Foreign Language Film at the 90th Academy Awards, but it was not nominated.

== Reception ==
On review aggregator website Rotten Tomatoes, the film has an approval rating of 89% based on 57 reviews, and an average rating of 7.2/10. The website's critics consensus reads, "A powerful character study, A Ciambra burns slowly, letting its compelling cast carry what could otherwise be just another coming-of-age story." On Metacritic, the film has a weighted average score of 70 out of 100, based on 17 critics, indicating "generally favorable reviews".

== Accolades ==
The film won the Georges Delerue Award for Best Soundtrack/Sound Design at Film Fest Gent in 2017 and won at 63rd David di Donatello for best director and best screenplay.

== See also ==
- List of submissions to the 90th Academy Awards for Best Foreign Language Film
- List of Italian submissions for the Academy Award for Best Foreign Language Film
