= Joshua James Richards =

British cinematographer

- Born: Penzance, Cornwall, England
- Occupation: Cinematographer

Joshua James Richards is an English cinematographer, best known for his work with his former partner, director Chloé Zhao.

== Career ==
Richards' first feature film was Chloé Zhao's Songs My Brothers Taught Me. For his work, he was nominated for the Independent Spirit Award for Best Cinematography. The duo would later reteam to do The Rider and Nomadland. For the latter, Richards received numerous accolades and awards, including a BAFTA Award, an Independent Spirit Award, and a nomination for an Academy Award.

== Filmography ==
Film
Year	Title	Director	Notes
2015	Songs My Brothers Taught Me	Chloé Zhao	1st collaboration with Zhao
2017	God's Own Country	Francis Lee	
2017	The Rider	Chloé Zhao	
2020	Nomadland	Chloé Zhao	
2027	Gold Mountain	Ang Lee	

Short film
Year	Title	Director
2011	New Skin	Vladimir de Fontenay
2011	Forget Me Not	Vladimir de Fontenay
2012	Glory Days	Benjamin Rutkowski
2013	Boneshaker	Nuotama Bodomo
2013	Rectangibles	Colleen Kwok
2013	The Lipstick Stain	Dagny Looper
2013	Light Rider	Federico Cesca
2013	No Sour Meadows	Columbine Goldsmith
2014	Afronauts	Nuotama Bodomo
2016	The Visitor	Ferran Mendoza Soler
