= Christmas Wedding Baby =

- Theatrical release poster
- Directed by: Kiara C. Jones
- Written by: Kiara C. Jones
- Produced by: Kiara C. Jones; Ralph Scott
- Starring: Lisa Arrindell, Maria Howell, Kimberley Drummond, Frances Turner, Stephen Hill, Sawandi Wilson
- Cinematography: Leonardo D'Antoni
- Edited by: Kiara C. Jones
- Production company: Cultivated Films LLC
- Distributed by: Cultivated Films LLC
- Release date: December 8, 2014
- Running time: 112 min
- Country: United States
- Language: English

Christmas Wedding Baby is a 2014 American romance film directed by Kiara C. Jones and starring Kimberley Drummond and Lisa Arrindell Anderson.

The film was released on December 8, 2014.

== Plot ==
Three sisters struggle to find happiness through the holiday season as the youngest sister and bride to be is traumatized when she discovers that her first love has been hired as her wedding photographer.

== Cast ==
- Kimberley Drummond as Andrea
- Sawandi Wilson as Gabriel
- Frances Turner as Charlotte
- Stephen Hill aa Isaac
- Lisa Arrindell Anderson as Lori
- Maria Howell as Miranda
- Jason Vendryes as Kendal
- Tad Jennings as Tad
- Maba Ba as Brent
- Nicole Maahs as Candy
- Rita Manyette as Stephanie
- Bernie Ask as Greg
- Micah Austin as Zac
- AnnaMarie Brown as Julia
- Jon Fine as Councilman Chambers
- Cindy Hogan as Nurse Rena
- Ellease Aponte as Dr. Sabian
- Dustin Kaloostian as Dr. Parise

== Reception ==
Nigel Coutinho of Blavity said, "With snappy dialogue, an even pace, and original music, this warm and funny, family-friendly flick will make you want to hit the beach this Christmas." Cinema Axis said, "Despite the flashes of potential Jones displays, Christmas Wedding Baby never strives to be more than it is. The film is merely content with appealing to those who like their romantic comedies wrapped with a very recognizable bow."

== Awards ==
- Directors Guild of America Grand Jury Award
- Blackstar Film Festival Audience Award
- Pan African film Festival Best Director
- Urban Media Makers Film Festival Best Feature Film
