= Kiara C. Jones =

American film director, writer, and producer

- Occupations: Director, Writer, Producer
- Notable work: Christmas Wedding Baby, A Woman on the Outside, Premature
- Awards: Directors Guild of America Grand Jury Award, Independent Spirit Award Nominee

Kiara C. Jones is an American film and television director, writer, and producer. She is the founder of Cultivated Films LLC.

== Early life and education ==
Kiara Jones is the daughter of parents from The Bronx and Brooklyn. When she was five-years-old her family moved to Jacksonville, Florida. In 1992, she graduated from Wolfson High School.

After her father’s death in a car accident, Jones enlisted in the United States Air Force, where she served as a computer security specialist and later retrained as a broadcaster at the Defense Information School. During her military career, Jones worked in radio and television broadcasting.

After leaving the Air Force, Jones pursued higher education, earning a Bachelor of Fine Arts degree magna cum laude from the University of Nevada, Las Vegas (UNLV) and a Master of Fine Arts in Film from New York University Tisch School of the Arts under artistic director Spike Lee.

== Career ==
=== Film and television ===
Jones is a writer, producer, and director with the company she runs, Cultivated Films, LLC. She debuted as a feature filmmaker with Christmas Wedding Baby, which won the Directors Guild of America Grand Jury Award and aired on BET and Netflix. She then directed 21 and Done, a documentary on children aging out of foster care which won Best Documentary at Reel Sisters of the Diaspora Film Festival and was a "Films With a Purpose (FWAP)" selection in 2018. From 2018-2022, she worked as a producer on the film A Woman on the Outside, which profiles the founder of a transportation service and nonprofit dedicated to helping families maintain connections with incarcerated loved ones.

Jones has worked as a producer on several notable films, including:

| Title | Year | Role(s) | Festival/Network Highlights | References |
|---|---|---|---|---|
| A Woman on the Outside | 2022 | Writer | Premiered at SXSW; Best Documentary at American Black Film Festival and Mammoth Lakes Film Festival; Audience Award winner at Philadelphia Film Festival; PBS broadcast in 2024 | |
| Premature | 2019 | Producer | Premiered at Sundance; Won Someone to Watch Award at Independent Spirit Awards | |
| She’s Lost Control | 2014 | Producer | Premiered at Berlinale; CICAE Award; Spirit Award nomination | |
| The Other Side of the Game | 2014 | Writer | Premiered at Tribeca Film Festival; Winner at Bombay Sapphire's Imagination Series film competition | |
| The First 48 / After the First 48 | Various | Consulting Producer | True crime TV series on A&E | |

== Awards and recognition ==
| Award | Work | Year | Notes | References |
|---|---|---|---|---|
| Directors Guild of America Grand Jury Award | Christmas Wedding Baby | 2015 | BlackStar Film Festival | |
| Independent Spirit Award Nominee | She’s Lost Control | 2014 | | |
| Best Documentary | A Woman on the Outside | 2022 | Mammoth Lakes Film Festival and American Black Film Festival | |
| NYSCA/NYFA Artist Fellowship | – | 2021 | New York Foundation for the Arts | |
| Writers Guild of America FilmNation NY Fellowship | – | 2020 | Screenwriters Fellowship | |
| ScreenCraft Film Fund | – | 2021 | | |
| Sony Diverse Directors Program | – | – | | |
| NYC Women's Fund | – | 2020 | Media, Music, and Theatre | |
| Best Documentary | A Woman on the Outside | – | Reel Sisters of the Diaspora Film Festival | |
| NYU Purple List | – | 2016 | Screenwriting Honors | |
| IFP Filmmaker Lab | – | 2020 | Documentary, Narrative, and Episodic Labs | |
| Trans Atlantic Partners Producing Fellow | – | 2017 | | |
| BRIO Award for Screenwriting | – | – | Bronx Council on the Arts | |
| Best Director | Christmas Wedding Baby | 2015 | Pan African Film Festival | |
| Best Narrative Feature | Christmas Wedding Baby | 2015 | BlackStar Film Festival | |
| Audience Award – Best Short | Barbasol | 2012 | Urbanworld Film Festival | |
