= Songs My Brothers Taught Me =

2015 film by Chloé Zhao

- Film poster
- Directed by: Chloé Zhao
- Written by: Chloé Zhao
- Produced by: Chloé Zhao; Forest Whitaker; Mollye Asher; Angela C. Lee; Nina Yang Bongiovi
- Starring: John Reddy; Jashaun St. John; Taysha Fuller; Travis Lone Hill; Eléonore Hendricks; Irene Bedard
- Cinematography: Joshua James Richards
- Edited by: Alan Canant; Chloé Zhao
- Distributed by: Kino Lorber
- Release dates: January 27, 2015 (Sundance); March 2, 2016
- Running time: 98 minutes
- Country: United States
- Language: English
- Budget: $330,000
- Box office: $146,476

Songs My Brothers Taught Me is a 2015 American drama film, written and directed by Chloé Zhao in her directorial debut. Developed at the Sundance Institute workshops, the film, set in the Pine Ridge Indian Reservation in South Dakota, explores the bond between a Lakota Sioux brother and his younger sister.

The film premiered at the 2015 Sundance Film Festival in the U.S. Dramatic Competition section. It was later screened in the Directors' Fortnight section at the 2015 Cannes Film Festival where it received a nomination for the Caméra d'Or Award for best first feature film.

== Plot ==
Sister and brother Jashaun and John Winters live with their mother Lisa on the Pine Ridge Indian Reservation. John helps support his family by illegally distributing alcohol to fellow residents. He is about to graduate from high school and plans to leave the reservation to go to Los Angeles with his girlfriend, Aurelia. Nervous about leaving, he visits his imprisoned brother, Cody, who urges John to leave.

The siblings' father, Carl Winters, dies in an accidental house fire, and they attend his funeral with their mother. Carl's funeral is crowded, as he had 25 children with 9 women. At the funeral the children talk amongst themselves; some chose not to take Carl's name as he was not around for most of their lives.

John goes to the café where Aurelia works, taking Jashaun with him. Getting bored while waiting for them, Jashaun goes to the back of the café where she overhears them talking about moving away together.

Jashaun decides to get a job helping Travis, an artist newly freed from prison, sell his wares. Travis tells her that the reason the number 7 keeps recurring is because of its religious and cultural significance, and also because Crazy Horse said that everything ended at Wounded Knee Massacre but would begin again in the 7th generation, Jashaun's generation.

John breaks the news to Aurelia's family that he is moving to be with her, but they are unimpressed as he will have no place to live and no job. While out on an alcohol run, John is attacked by rival bootleggers and his truck is set on fire.

Jashaun goes to Travis' home but learns that, while drunk, he and a friend's father beat each other up and were arrested. She goes to her first rodeo where she runs into one of her half-brothers, Kevin Winters, who lets her ride their father's favorite horse, Sundance. Kevin tells her that despite growing up in the same home as his parents, they were seldom there, spending all their time at rodeos.

John finally tells his family he is leaving. However, when he arrives at Aurelia's place, he decides not to go and returns home. He gets a job working with one of his half-brothers at a body shop and settles into his life on the reservation.

== Cast ==
- John Reddy as Johnny Winters
- Jashaun St. John as Jashaun Winters
- Travis Lone Hill as Travis
- Taysha Fuller as Aurelia Clifford
- Irene Bedard as Lisa Winters
- Allen Reddy as Bill

== Production ==
Zhao had been trying to get the film made for about four years, her biggest hurdle being the lack of funding. The film had a tumultuous production that included losing initial funding when a producer backed out last minute, along with burglars breaking into Zhao’s apartment and stealing some of her filmmaking gear before a scheduled shoot. Locations were often scouted on the same day they were shot at, with script and shot list being adjusted that same day to accommodate them. The majority of the cast was populated by amateurs, including people Zhao knew from high school and even people who were coming in and out of prison sentences.

== Release ==
Fortissimo Films acquired the film as its international sales agent after its debut at Sundance Film Festival. The film was released in theaters in France by Diaphana Distribution. In January 2016, it was announced that Kino Lorber had come on board as the North American distributor releasing the film in select theatres nationwide beginning in March. It is available for streaming on various online services, including Amazon and Kanopy (US), and made available on MUBI (worldwide) in April 2021.

== Reception ==
=== Critical response ===
The film received positive reviews for its honest portrayal of young people's lives on the reservation. The review aggregation website Rotten Tomatoes gives a rating of 94% based on 31 reviews and an average rating of 7.83/10. The website's critical consensus reads, "A naturalistic drama that quietly earns its emotional resonance, Songs My Brothers Taught Me further establishes writer-director Chloé Zhao as a gifted filmmaker and empathetic storyteller."

=== Accolades ===
Award	Date of ceremony	Category	Recipient(s) and nominee(s)	Result	Ref.
Gotham Awards	December 1, 2014	Spotlight on Women Filmmakers "Live the Dream" Grant	Chloé Zhao	Won	
Sundance Film Festival	January 30, 2015	US Grand Jury Prize – Dramatic	Chloé Zhao	Nominated	
Cannes Film Festival	May 24, 2015	Caméra d'Or	Chloé Zhao	Nominated	
Jerusalem Film Festival	July 19, 2015	FIPRESCI Award for Best First Film	Chloé Zhao	Won	
Deauville American Film Festival	September 13, 2015	Grand Prix	Chloé Zhao	Nominated	
American Indian Film Festival	November 14, 2015	Best Director	Chloé Zhao	Won	
Camerimage	November 21, 2015	Best Cinematography Debut	Joshua James Richards	Won	
Camerimage	November 21, 2015	Best Directorial Debut	Chloé Zhao	Nominated	
Mumbai International Film Festival	February 3, 2016	Best Screenwriting	Chloé Zhao	Won	
Independent Spirit Awards	February 27, 2016	Best First Feature	Chloé Zhao, Mollye Asher, Nina Yang Bongiovi, Angela C. Lee and Forest Whitaker	Nominated	
Independent Spirit Awards	February 27, 2016	Best Cinematography	Joshua James Richards	Nominated	
Independent Spirit Awards	February 27, 2016	Someone to Watch Award	Chloé Zhao	Nominated	
Fargo Film Festival	March 19, 2016	Prairie Spirit Award	Chloé Zhao	Won	
