= A Chiara =

2021 film by Jonas Carpignano

- Theatrical release poster
- Directed by: Jonas Carpignano
- Screenplay by: Jonas Carpignano
- Produced by: Jon Coplon; Ryan Zacarias; Paolo Carpignano
- Starring: Swamy Rotolo; Claudio Rotolo; Grecia Rotolo; Carmela Fumo
- Cinematography: Tim Curtin
- Edited by: Affonso Gonçalves
- Music by: Benh Zeitlin; Dan Romer
- Production companies: Stayblack Productions; Haut et Court; Rai Cinema; Arte France Cinéma; Film i Väst; Snowglobe; MK2 Films; MIBACT; Eurimages
- Distributed by: MK2 Films (Italy); Lucky Red (Italy); Haut et Court Distribution (France); Neon (United States)
- Release date: July 9, 2021 (Cannes)
- Running time: 121 minutes
- Countries: Italy; France; United States; Sweden
- Language: Italian
- Box office: $592,745

A Chiara (Italian: [a kˈkjaːra]) is a 2021 Italian-language drama film directed and written by Jonas Carpignano, the third film in his film trilogy set in a Calabrian town, following Mediterranea (2015) and A Ciambra (2017). The film stars Swamy Rotolo, Claudio Rotolo, Grecia Rotolo, and Carmela Fumo and had its world premiere at the Cannes Film Festival on July 9, 2021, in the Directors' Fortnight section, to very positive reviews. Following its festival screening, the film was distributed by MK2 Films and Lucky Red in Italy and Neon in the United States.

== Plot ==
The Guerrasio family and friends gather to celebrate Claudio and Carmela's oldest daughter's 18th birthday, despite a healthy rivalry between the birthday girl and her 15-year-old sister, Chiara. However, later that night, a car explodes on the family's street and Chiara witnesses her father fleeing. Everything changes the next day when the family patriarch disappears, and Carmela acts as though there is nothing to worry about. Chiara, unconvinced by the news story and her mother's low-level panic, finds a secret door in her living room and begins a deep investigation into her family, discovering ties to the mafia and the criminal underworld. The following day, a social worker picks up Chiara at school and puts her in foster care to protect her from her problematic family. As she gets closer to the truth, she is forced to decide what kind of future she wants for herself.

== Cast ==
- Swamy Rotolo as Chiara
- Claudio Rotolo as Claudio
- Grecia Rotolo as Giulia
- Carmela Fumo as Carmela
- Giorgia Rotolo as Giorgia
- Antonio Rotolo as Antonio
- Vincenzo Rotolo as Enzo
- Antonina Fumo as Nina
- Giusi D'Uscio as Giusi
- Patrizia Amato as Patatina
- Concetta Grillo as Celeste Tripodi
- Koudous Seihon
- Pio Amato
- Iolanda Amato

== Production ==
On June 19, 2019, it was announced that Jonas Carpignano was set to write and direct his third film, A Chiara, a follow-up to his 2017 feature A Ciambra. Casting was underway and principal photography was scheduled to begin in October 2019 in Calabria, situated in Southern Italy. Italian production company Stayblack Productions and France's Haut et Court were set to produce the film with financing from Rai Cinema, Arte France Cinéma, and MIBACT. On October 22, 2019, the film was among 16 features selected by Eurimages for financial backing. The film's cast is made up of the Rotolo family, led by Swamy Rotolo in the title role of Chiara.

By March 2021, the film had wrapped shooting and post-production had begun, with MK2 Films boarding international sales for the film and distributing it in Italy. On July 18, 2021, following the film's award-winning premiere at the Cannes Film Festival, Neon acquired North American distribution rights to the film.

== Release ==
The film had its world premiere at the 2021 Cannes Film Festival in the Directors' Fortnight section on July 9, 2021. It is also scheduled to have its North American premiere at the 2021 New York Film Festival in the Main Slate. In addition, the film is set to also be screened at the 55th Karlovy Vary International Film Festival in August 2021 as part of the Horizons section. Also, it was screened at the Zurich Film Festival and won a "Golden Eye" Award in the Feature Film Competition in 2021.

The film will be released in cinemas by MK2 Films and Haut et Court Distribution in Italy and France respectively. In addition, Neon will release the film theatrically in the United States and Canada and Mubi will release the film via streaming in the United Kingdom and Ireland, Germany, Turkey, and Latin America.

== Reception ==
=== Critical response ===
Based on 55 reviews, the film holds a rating of 91% on Rotten Tomatoes, with an average rating of 7.1/10. The site's critical consensus reads, "A willingness to sidestep clichés and a skilled central performance help A Chiara stand out in the crowded coming-of-age genre." On review aggregator Metacritic, the film holds a rating of 75 out of 100 based on 18 critic reviews, indicating "generally favourable reviews".

In a positive review for Variety, Jay Weissberg wrote that "A Chiara allows Carpignano an opportunity to turn his generous gaze on another ignored segment of Calabrian society, one whose values — family, mutual support — can't be dismissed because we're uncomfortable with how they exist side-by-side with a sense of ethics that stops at the bounds of kinship." He also praised the cinematography and original score, saying "Tim Curtin's dynamic camera is attuned to Chiara's teenage energy without going overboard, playing on a liminal balance between security and imbalance. Carpignano uses music to even more forcefully reflect Chiara's life, though its omnipresence risks driving the film's moods rather than eliding with them." The Hollywood Reporter's David Rooney called the film Carpignano's "most accomplished and affecting film to date" and "a companion piece that takes rewarding new turns" in another positive review.

Upon winning the Best European Film in the Directors' Fortnight section at the 2021 Cannes Film Festival, the Europa Cinemas Label jury said:

This story of the gradual empowerment of the young female character and her relationship with her father and her extended family is brilliantly structured and built. The casting of non-professionals in all of the roles works extremely well, and the imaginative sound design makes a big contribution to the appeal of the film.

=== Accolades ===
Award	Date of ceremony	Category	Recipient(s)	Result	Ref(s)
Cannes Film Festival	July 15, 2021	Europa Cinemas Label for Best European Film		Won	
