= Mediterranea (film) =

2015 film

- Film poster
- Directed by: Jonas Carpignano
- Written by: Jonas Carpignano
- Produced by: Jason Michael Berman; Chris Columbus; Jon Coplon; Christoph Daniel; Andrew Kortschak; John Lesher; Ryan Lough; Justin Nappi; Alain Peyrollaz; Gwyn Sannia; Marc Schmidheiny; Victor Shapiro; Raphael Swann; Ryan Zacarias
- Starring: Koudous Seihon
- Cinematography: Wyatt Garfield
- Edited by: Affonso Gonçalves
- Music by: Dan Romer; Benh Zeitlin
- Release date: 19 May 2015 (Cannes)
- Running time: 107 minutes
- Country: Italy
- Language: Italian

Mediterranea (Italian: [mediterˈraːnea]) is a 2015 Italian drama film written and directed by Jonas Carpignano. It was screened in the Critics' Week section at the 2015 Cannes Film Festival. The film stars Koudous Seihon and Alassane Sy as friends who cross the Mediterranean Sea to immigrate to Italy, where they experience unexpected hostility from locals. It is the first in the director's trilogy set in a Calabrian town, followed by A Ciambra (2017) and A Chiara (2022).

== Plot ==
Ayiva makes the difficult journey from Burkina Faso through Algeria and Libya and eventually reaches Italy. He pays for his passage and sees his compatriots robbed along the way. In southern Italy, he lives in a squatted property while earning some money from orange picking and petty theft, and sends some money back to his family in Africa. The Africans are exploited for their cheap labour while not being welcomed by local villagers, though Ayiva is welcomed into the home of one Italian family, the Fondacaros. He tried to discourage his sister from leaving Africa to try and join him in Europe.

After one of their colleagues is attacked by Italian police, many of the refugees begin a protest against their treatment and start damaging property and cars in the village. They are attacked in turn by some of the villagers. This escalates into a riot; Italian police arrive and fire tear gas toward the protesters, and then attack them. Ayiva manages to escape down a side alley but then has to flee from a crowd of angry villagers; his friend Abas is caught and beaten up. The crowd run off at the sound of approaching sirens; Abas is left lying in the street badly injured. Ayiva manages to get him taken back to the Fondacaro family, who try to treat his injuries.

A local refugee charity suggests that Abas would be able to get a residence permit for a year, because of his injuries, but Ayiva says they would rather return home to Africa. He speaks to his sister and daughter via Skype. He is helping serve drinks for the Fondacaros at a family celebration when they invite him inside, and the film ends with the sound of the pop music from the party as Ayiva slowly walks inside.

== Cast ==
- Koudous Seihon as Ayiva
- Alassane Sy as Abas
- Francesco Papasergio as Mommo
- Pio Amato as Pio
- Vincenzina Siciliano as Marta

== Reception ==
=== Critical response ===
Mediterranea has an approval rating of 90% on review aggregator website Rotten Tomatoes, based on 21 reviews, and an average rating of 7.2/10. The website's critical consensus states: "Perhaps too laser-focused, Mediterranea examines the excruciating journey of an immigrant with an anthropological lens; a passage full of hope against all hopelessness". Metacritic assigned the film a weighted average score of 77 out of 100, based on 11 critics, indicating "generally favorable reviews".
