= Constance Tsang =

American filmmaker

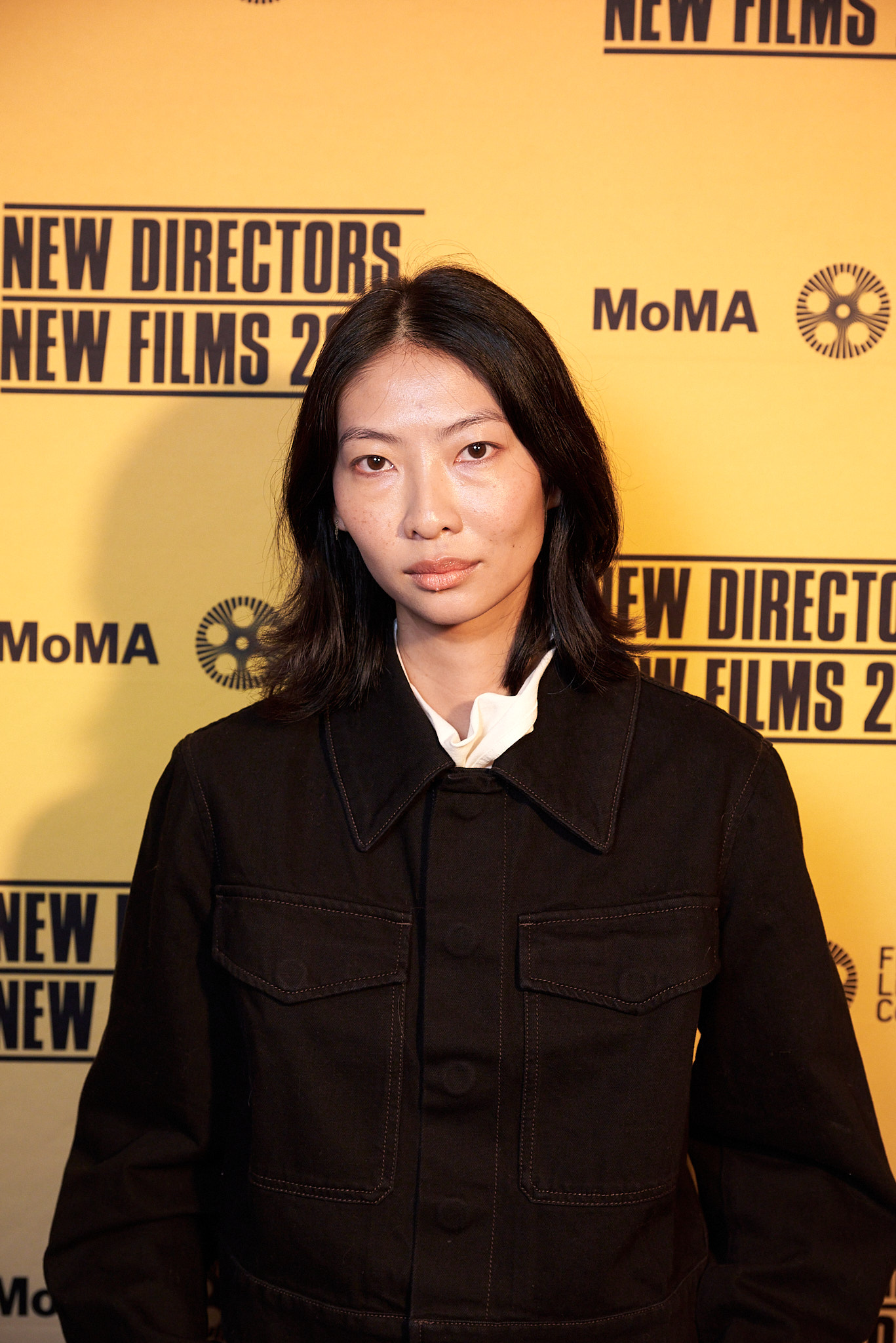
- Tsang at New Directors/New Films Festival 2025
- Education: Columbia University School of the Arts (MFA)
- Notable work: Blue Sun Palace

Constance Tsang (Chinese: 曾佩裕) is an American filmmaker. Her debut feature film, Blue Sun Palace, which she had directed and written, was selected for the 2024 Cannes Film Festival.

== Early life and education ==
Tsang grew up in Flushing, Queens. She graduated with a Master of Fine Arts degree from the Columbia University School of the Arts in 2020.

== Career ==
In 2020, as a student at Columbia University, Tsang shot Beau, a short film following the toxic relationship between an artist and her lover.

In 2024, Tsang's debut feature film Blue Sun Palace premiered at Cannes as part of Critics' Week and won the French Touch Prize. Starring Haipeng Xu, Lee Kang-sheng, and Wu Ke-xi, the film follows the lives of immigrants in Flushing. The film was later screened as part of New Directors/New Films Festival in 2025 and opened in theaters nationwide on April 25. Tsang stated in Moveable Fest that she had taken "around five years" to fully flesh out the story for Blue Sun Palace, during which she endured numerous challenges like the COVID-19 pandemic, the loss of her father, and the dissolution of a long-term relationship. She noted that the film's "first iterations" were "very different to the film that we're watching."

In March 2025, Tsang was announced as one of six "emerging directors" selected for the 49th session of the La Résidence du Festival de Cannes, or Festival Residence, running from March 15 to July 31. There, she will work on her second feature film, My Mother and Yours.

Among Tsang's inspirations are Chantal Akerman, Agnès Varda, and Céline Sciamma.
