= Jonas Carpignano =

American-Italian film director

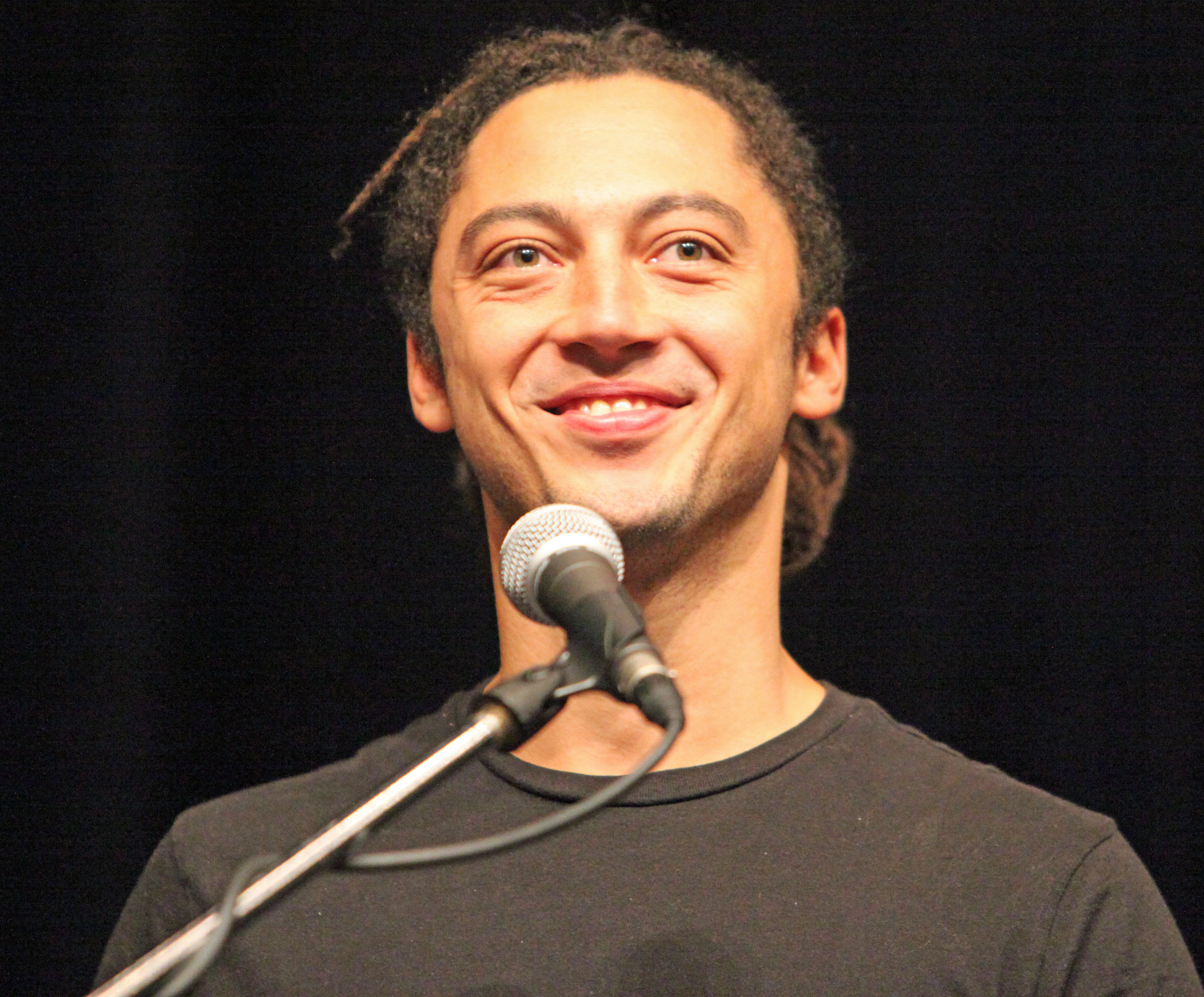
- Born: 16 January 1984 (age 42); The Bronx, New York City, New York, United States
- Education: Wesleyan University; New York University Tisch School of the Arts
- Occupation: Film director
- Parent(s): Paolo Carpignano; Diane Carpignano
- Awards: Bingham Ray Breakthrough Director Award at the IFP Gotham Awards; The Guggenheim Fellowship

Jonas Carpignano (Italian: [ˈdʒɔːnas karpiɲˈɲaːno]; born January 16, 1984) is an American-Italian filmmaker. He is known for the films Mediterranea, A Ciambra, and A Chiara.

== Early life and career ==
Carpignano was born and raised in the East Bronx, New York City on January 16, 1984. His father, Paolo Carpignano, is a graduate school professor from Rome, Italy. His mother, Diane Benskin Carpignano, is from a family originally from Barbados in the Caribbean. He grew up in New York but spent extensive periods of time in Rome, Italy where his father's family resided. His paternal grandfather Vittorio Carpignano was a filmmaker and producer and his uncle, Luciano Emmer, was an Italian film director. On his mother's side, his uncle Sammy Benskin was a jazz pianist and band leader. He was educated at the Fieldston School in Riverdale. He began making films at Wesleyan University, where he graduated with honors in 2006 and, after having worked in the film industry in Italy and in the United States for a few years, he enrolled in the New York University Tisch School of Arts Graduate Film Program where he made his first short films. His work as a director has been shown at the Cannes Film Festival, Venice Film Festival and the New York Film Festival.

Carpignano has written and directed several award-winning short films, including A Chjana which won best short film at the Venice Film Festival and A Ciambra which won the Discovery Award at the Cannes film festival - Semaine De La Critique in 2014.

In 2015, Carpignano made his feature debut with Mediterranea, which had its world premiere at the 2015 Cannes Film Festival's International Critics' Week. The film was nominated for three Independent Sprit Awards and it earned Carpignano the Bingham Ray Breakthrough Director Award at the IFP Gotham Awards. The National Board of Review gave Carpignano the award for the best directorial debut of 2015 and put Mediterranea on its list of the top five foreign language films of the year.

In 2017 Carpignano's second feature film A Ciambra had its world premiere in the Director's Fortnight at 2017 Cannes Film Festival. The film was executive produced by Martin Scorsese and won the Europa Labels prize for best European film. The film was selected by Italy to represent the country in the best foreign language film category of the Academy Awards. The film was not nominated but it did earn Carpignano a nomination for best director at the 2018 Film Independent Spirit Awards and was named the best Italian Film of 2017 by the National Syndicate of Italian Film Critics (SNCCI). In 2018 A Ciambra was nominated for seven David di Donatello Awards ultimately winning two including the award for best director.

In 2021 Carpignano's third feature A Chiara had its world premiere in the Director's Fortnight at the 2021 Cannes Film Festival and won the Europa Labels prize for Best European film. The film received three nominations at the 2022 Film Independent Spirit awards as well as six nominations at the David di Donatello Awards where it took the award for best actress.

== Awards ==
He has received the award for breakthrough director at Gotham Independent Film Awards 2015 for his first feature film Mediterranea which was also named the best directorial debut of 2015 by the National Board of Review. In 2016 he was awarded the Guggenheim Fellowship. In 2017 his film A Ciambra won the Europa label cinema prize at the Director's Fortnight at the Cannes film festival.

In 2018 Carpignano won the award for best director (Miglior Regia) at the David di Donatello.

In 2021 Carpignano's third film A Chiara won the Europa label cinema prize at the Director's Fortnight at the Cannes film festival making the second time that the director earned this prize.

== Personal life ==
Carpignano lives in Italy, where he continues to work as a writer and director.

== Filmography ==
| Year | Film | Role |
|---|---|---|
| 2012 | A Chjàna (Short) | Writer Director |
| 2014 | A Ciambra (Short) | Writer Director |
| 2015 | Mediterranea | Writer Director |
| 2017 | A Ciambra | Writer Director |
| 2021 | A Chiara | Writer Director |
