= Manos sucias =

- Film poster
- Directed by: Josef Wladyka
- Written by: Josef Wladyka; Alan Blanco
- Produced by: Elena Greenlee; Márcia Nunes
- Starring: Cristian James Abvincula; Jarlin Javier Martinez; Hadder Blandon
- Cinematography: Alan Blanco
- Edited by: Kristan Sprague
- Music by: Scott Thorough
- Release date: April 17, 2014 (Tribeca)
- Running time: 84 minutes
- Countries: United States; Colombia
- Language: Spanish

Manos sucias (lit. 'Dirty hands') is a 2014 American-Colombian thriller drama film directed and co-written by Josef Wladyka and starring Cristian James Abvincula, Jarlin Javier Martinez and Hadder Blandon. Spike Lee served as an executive producer of the film.

== Cast ==
- Cristian James Abvincula as Delio
- Jarlin Javier Martinez as Jacobo
- Hadder Blandon as Miguel
- Manuel David Riascos as Jorge

== Reception ==
The film has a 92% rating on Rotten Tomatoes.
