= 17th Independent Spirit Awards =

Film awards edition

- Date: March 23, 2002
- Site: Santa Monica, California, U.S.
- Hosted by: John Waters

Highlights
- Best Film: Memento
- Most awards: Memento (4)
- Most nominations: L.I.E. (7)

The 17th Independent Spirit Awards, honoring the best in independent filmmaking for 2001, were announced on March 23, 2002. It was hosted by John Waters.

== Winners and nominees ==
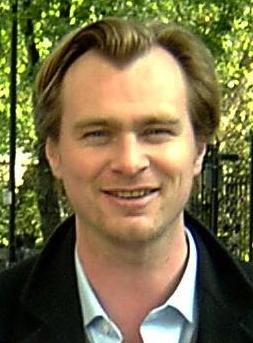
Christopher Nolan, Best Director and Screenplay winner

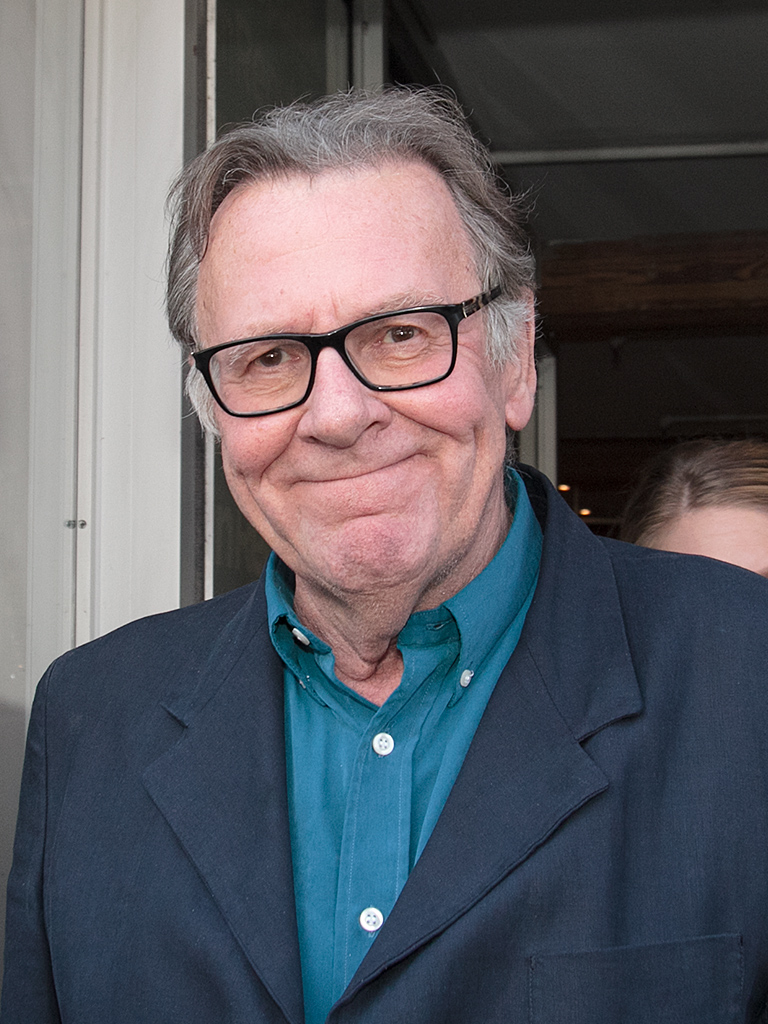
Tom Wilkinson, Best Male Lead winner

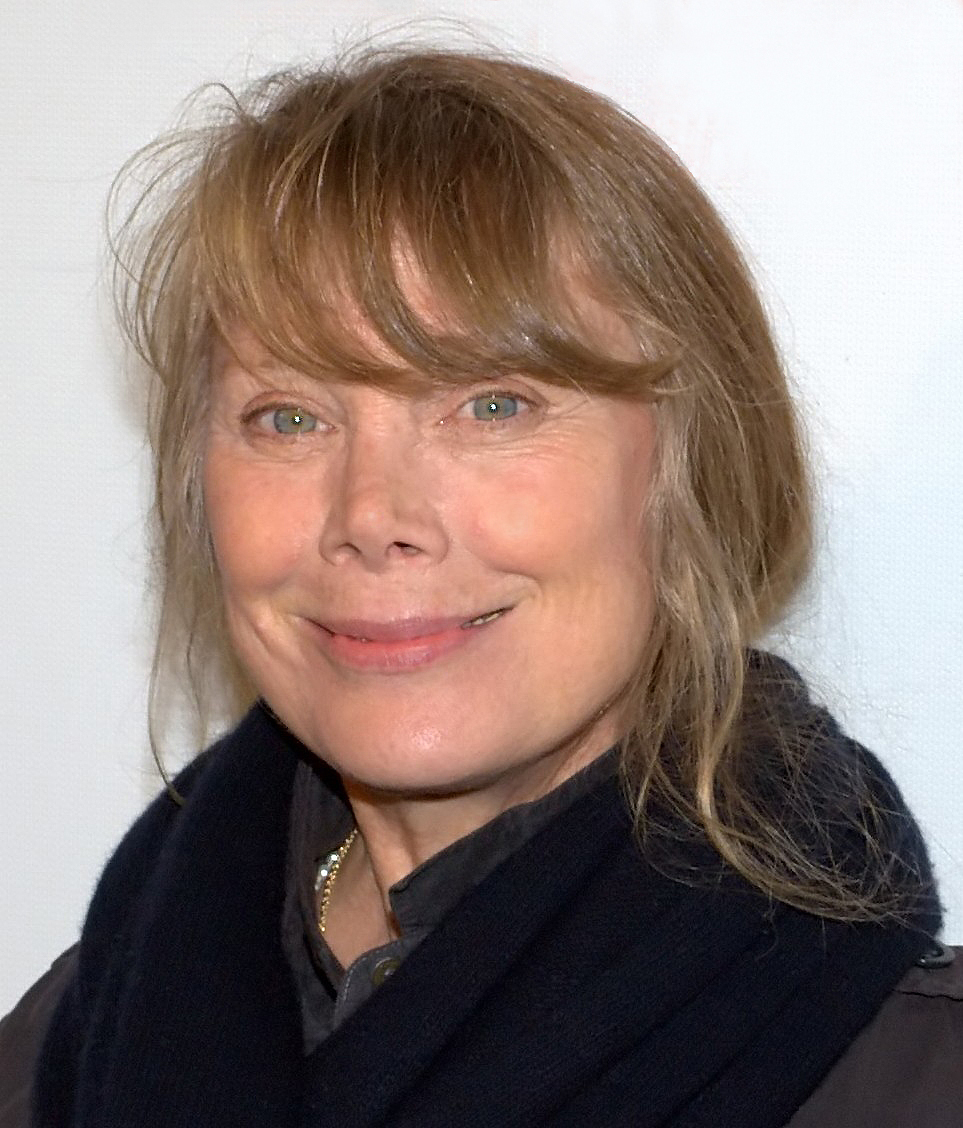
Sissy Spacek, Best Female Lead winner

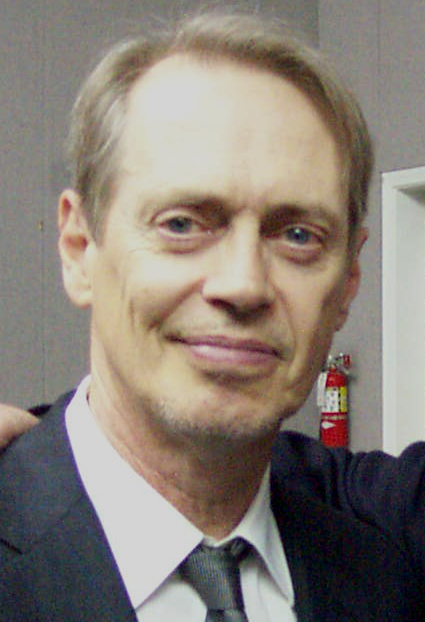
Steve Buscemi, Best Supporting Male winner

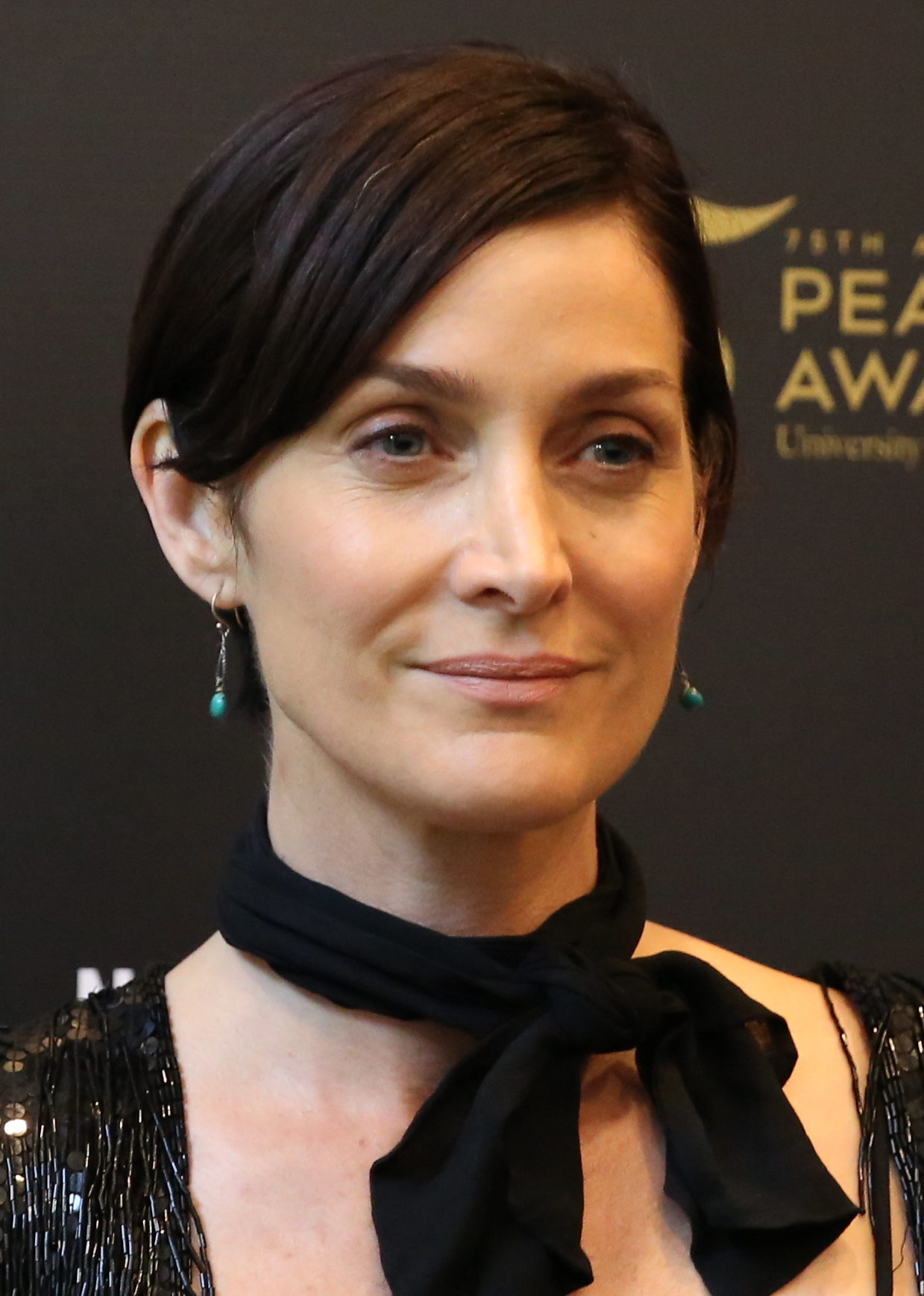
Carrie-Anne Moss, Best Supporting Female winner

Best Feature	Best Director
Memento: Hedwig and the Angry Inch; L.I.E.; Things Behind the Sun; Waking Life	Christopher Nolan – Memento: Michael Cuesta – L.I.E.; Cheryl Dunye – Stranger Inside; Richard Linklater – Waking Life; John Cameron Mitchell – Hedwig and the Angry Inch
Best Male Lead	Best Female Lead
Tom Wilkinson – In the Bedroom: Brian Cox – L.I.E.; Ryan Gosling – The Believer; Jake Gyllenhaal – Donnie Darko; John Cameron Mitchell – Hedwig and the Angry Inch	Sissy Spacek – In the Bedroom: Kim Dickens – Things Behind the Sun; Molly Parker – The Center of the World; Tilda Swinton – The Deep End; Kerry Washington – Lift
Best Supporting Male	Best Supporting Female
Steve Buscemi – Ghost World: Don Cheadle – Things Behind the Sun; Billy Kay – L.I.E.; Garrett Morris – Jackpot; John C. Reilly – The Anniversary Party	Carrie-Anne Moss – Memento: Davenia McFadden – Stranger Inside; Summer Phoenix – The Believer; Uma Thurman – Tape; Tamara Tunie – The Caveman's Valentine
Best Screenplay	Best First Screenplay
Memento – Christopher Nolan: The Believer – Henry Bean; In the Bedroom – Robert Festinger and Todd Field; Monster's Ball – Milo Addica and Will Rokos; Waking Life – Richard Linklater	Ghost World – Daniel Clowes and Terry Zwigoff: The Anniversary Party – Jennifer Jason Leigh and Alan Cumming; Donnie Darko – Richard Kelly; Hedwig and the Angry Inch – John Cameron Mitchell; L.I.E. – Stephen M. Ryder, Michael Cuesta and Gerald Cuesta
Best First Feature	Best Debut Performance
In the Bedroom: The Anniversary Party; The Believer; Donnie Darko; Ghost World	Paul Franklin Dano – L.I.E.: Hilary Howard, Anthony Leslie and Mitchell Riggs – Kaaterskill Falls; Clint Jordan – Virgil Bliss; Ana Reeder – Acts of Worship; Yolonda Ross – Stranger Inside
Best Cinematography	Best Documentary Feature
Mulholland Drive – Peter Deming: The American Astronaut – W. Mott Hupfel III; The Deep End – Giles Nuttgens; Hedwig and the Angry Inch – Frank G. DeMarco; Memento – Wally Pfister	Dogtown and Z-Boys: Go Tigers!; LaLee's Kin: The Legacy of Cotton; Promises; Scratch
Best International Film
Amélie • France: Amores Perros • Mexico; Lumumba • Belgium/France/Germany/Haiti; Sexy Beast • Spain/UK; Together • Denmark/Italy/Sweden

== Special awards ==
=== John Cassavetes Award ===
Jackpot

- Acts of Worship
- Kaaterskill Falls
- Punks
- Virgil Bliss

=== Truer Than Fiction Award ===
Hybrid

- Children Underground
- The Mark of Cain
- Promises
- Trembling Before G-d

=== Producers Award ===
Rene Bastian and Linda Moran – Martin & Orloff and L.I.E.

- Adrienne Gruben – Treasure Island and Olympia
- Jasmine Kosovic – Just One Time and The Adventures of Sebastian Cole
- Nadia Leonelli – Acts of Worship and Perfume

=== Someone to Watch Award ===
Debra Eisenstadt – Daydream Believer

- DeMane Davis and Khari Streeter – Lift
- Michael Gilio – Kwik Stop
- David Maquiling – Too Much Sleep

== Films with multiple nominations and awards ==
=== Films that received multiple nominations ===
Nominations	Film
7	L.I.E.
5	Hedwig and the Angry Inch
5	Memento
3	Acts of Worship
3	The Anniversary Party
3	Donnie Darko
3	Ghost World
3	Waking Life

=== Films that won multiple awards ===
Awards	Film
4	Memento
3	In the Bedroom
2	Ghost World
2	L.I.E.
