= Billy Kay filmography =

Billy Kay is an American actor and singer. As a toddler, he first appeared in the 1987 comedy Three Men and a Baby. He continued with uncredited roles in films such as Alice (1990) and several independent films. At the age of eleven, he starred in the stage musical Oliver! and appeared in more theatrical plays including The Who's Tommy and The Prince and the Pauper.

Kay made his major screen debut with the role of Shayne Lewis on the CBS soap opera Guiding Light, which earned him a nomination for a YoungStar Award for Best Young Actor in a Daytime TV Series.

== Filmography ==
=== Films ===
Title	Year	Role	Notes	Ref(s)
Three Men and a Baby	1987	Toddler	Uncredited	
Alice	1990	Billy	Uncredited	
Nathan Grimm	1998	Timmy	Short film	
The Magic of Marciano	2000	Brendan		
Time Share	2000	Lewis Farragher		
The Newcomers	2000	Gil Weatherton		
L.I.E.	2001	Gary Terrio		
Halloween: Resurrection	2002	Scott		
The Gray in Between	2002	Evil		
The Battle of Shaker Heights	2003	Lance Norway		
Debating Robert Lee	2004	David Russell		
Wasted	2005	Johnny	Short film	
The Black Facade	2009	Jerry		
Choose	2010	Brian		
Yelling to the Sky	2011	Dobbs		
Losers Take All	2011	Billy		

=== Television ===
Title	Year	Role	Network	Notes	Ref.
Zoya	1995	Newsboy	NBC	Television film	
Another World	1998	Jeremy	NBC		
KaBlam!	1999	(Voice)	Nickelodeon	Episode: "In It to Win It", Segment: "Garbage Boy"	
Guiding Light	1999–2003	Shayne Lewis	CBS	Recurring cast	
The Invisible Man	2000	Bully	Sci-Fi Channel	Episode: "Pilot"	
Celebrity Deathmatch	2001	Timmy Leland (Voice)	MTV	Episode: "Nick's Little Friend"	
In My Life	2002		WB	Episode: "Pilot"	
Law & Order: Special Victims Unit	2002	Tommy Kessler	NBC	Episode: "Popular"	
A Wedding Story: Josh and Reva	2002	Shayne Lewis		Television film	
Touched by an Angel	2003	Victor Jackson	CBS	Episode: "Virtual Reality"	
NYPD Blue	2003	Kurt Ackerman	ABC	Episodes: "Keeping Abreast" and "Andy Appleseed"	
CSI: Miami	2004	Wally Shmagin	CBS	Episode: "Wannabe"	
Charmed	2005	Hugo	WB	Episode: "Imaginary Fiends"	
Blue Bloods	2011	Xavier Sardina	CBS	Episode: "Innocence"	

=== Theatre ===
Title	Year	Role	Theatre	Notes	Ref.
What Use of Flowers	199?	William			
Oliver!	1995	Artful Dodger	Carriage House Playhouse		
The Who's Tommy	1996	Young Tommy	Gateway Playhouse		
The Prince and the Pauper	1997	Pauper	Eugene O'Neill Theatre		

=== Music video appearances ===
Title	Year	Performer	Album	Ref.
"All I Want for Christmas Is You"	1994	Mariah Carey	Merry Christmas	
