= List of awards and nominations received by Paul Dano =

List of Paul Dano awards
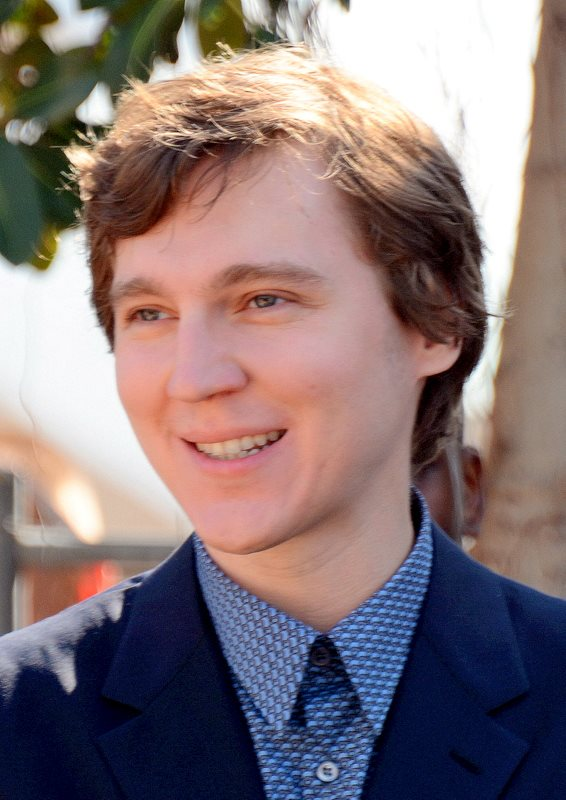

This article is a list of awards and nominations received by Paul Dano.

Paul Dano is an American actor. Known for his roles in film and television, he has received several awards including two Critics' Choice Movie Awards, an Independent Spirit Award, and a Screen Actors Guild Award as well as nominations for numerous accolades including a British Academy Film Award, two Primetime Emmy Awards, and a Golden Globe Award.

For his role as a troubled 16 year old boy in the drama film L.I.E. (2002) he received the Independent Spirit Award for Outstanding Debut Performance. He gained critical acclaim for his role as misanthropic teenager in the comedy-drama Little Miss Sunshine (2006), and along with the ensemble earned the Screen Actors Guild Award for Outstanding Performance by a Cast in a Motion Picture. For his dual roles as Paul and Eli Sunday in the Paul Thomas Anderson directed film There Will Be Blood (2007) he was nominated for the BAFTA Award for Best Actor in a Supporting Role. For his portrayal of musician Brian Wilson in the biopic Love and Mercy (2015) he was nominated for the Golden Globe Award for Best Supporting Actor – Motion Picture.

Known also for his roles on television, Dano earned Primetime Emmy Award nominations for Outstanding Supporting Actor in a Limited or Anthology Series or Movie for his role as a convicted murderer in the Showtime limited series Escape at Dannemora (2018) and for Outstanding Guest Actor in a Drama Series for his role as a neighbor in the Amazon Prime Video drama series Mr. & Mrs. Smith (2024).

== Major associations ==
=== BAFTA Awards ===
Year	Category	Work	Result	Ref.
2007	Best Actor in a Supporting Role	There Will Be Blood	Nominated	

=== Critics' Choice Awards ===
Year	Category	Work	Result	Ref.
Critics' Choice Movie Awards
2006	Best Young Performer	Little Miss Sunshine	Won	
2006	Best Acting Ensemble	Little Miss Sunshine	Won	
2013	Best Acting Ensemble	12 Years a Slave	Nominated	
2015	Best Supporting Actor	Love & Mercy	Nominated	
2022	Best Supporting Actor	The Fabelmans	Nominated	
2022	Best Acting Ensemble (Note: Cast Member)	The Fabelmans	Nominated	
Critics' Choice Television Awards
2018	Best Actor in a Limited Series or Movie Made for Television	Escape at Dannemora	Nominated	

=== Emmy Awards ===
Primetime Emmy Awards
Year	Category	Work	Result	Ref.
2019	Outstanding Supporting Actor in a Limited Series or Movie	Escape at Dannemora	Nominated	
2024	Outstanding Guest Actor in a Drama Series	Mr. & Mrs. Smith	Nominated	

=== Golden Globe Awards ===
Year	Category	Work	Result	Ref.
2016	Best Supporting Actor – Motion Picture	Love & Mercy	Nominated	

=== Independent Spirit Awards ===
Year	Award/Category	Work	Result	Ref.
2002	Best Debut Performance	L.I.E.	Won	
2007	Best Supporting Male	Little Miss Sunshine	Nominated	
2016	Best Supporting Male	Love & Mercy	Nominated	
2019	Best First Feature	Wildlife	Nominated	

=== Screen Actors Guild Awards ===
Year	Category	Work	Result	Ref.
2007	Outstanding Cast in a Motion Picture	Little Miss Sunshine	Won	
2014	Outstanding Cast in a Motion Picture	12 Years a Slave	Nominated	
2023	Outstanding Cast in a Motion Picture	The Fabelmans	Nominated	
2023	Outstanding Actor in a Supporting Role	The Fabelmans	Nominated	

== Other awards and nominations ==
=== Alliance of Women Film Journalists ===
Year	Award/Category	Work	Result	Ref.
2013	Best Ensemble Cast	12 Years a Slave	Nominated	
2016	Best Supporting Actor	Love & Mercy	Won	

=== Black Reel Awards ===
Year	Award/Category	Work	Result	Ref.
2014	Outstanding Ensemble	12 Years a Slave	Won	

=== Boston Online Film Critics Association ===
Year	Award/Category	Work	Result	Ref.
2013	Best Ensemble	12 Years a Slave	Won	

=== Boston Society of Film Critics ===
Year	Award/Category	Work	Result	Ref.
2015	Best Actor	Love & Mercy	Won	

=== Dallas-Fort Worth Film Critics Association ===
Year	Award/Category	Work	Result	Ref.
2015	Best Supporting Actor	Love & Mercy	Won	

=== Detroit Film Critics Society ===
Year	Award/Category	Work	Result	Ref.
2007	Best Supporting Actor	There Will Be Blood	Nominated	
2013	Best Ensemble Cast	12 Years a Slave	Nominated	
2015	Best Supporting Actor	Love & Mercy	Nominated	

=== Directors' Week Awards ===
Year	Award/Category	Work	Result	Ref.
2001	L.I.E.	Best Actor	Won	

=== Florida Film Critics Circle ===
Year	Award/Category	Work	Result	Ref.
2015	Best Actor	Love & Mercy	Won	
2022	Best Supporting Actor	The Fabelmans	Nominated	

=== Empire Awards ===
Year	Award/Category	Work	Result	Ref.
2007	Best Male Newcomer	Little Miss Sunshine	Nominated	

=== Gotham Awards ===
Year	Award/Category	Work	Result	Ref.
2006	Best Ensemble Cast	Little Miss Sunshine	Nominated	
2015	Best Actor	Love & Mercy	Won	

=== Grand Jury Awards ===
Year	Award/Category	Work	Result	Ref.
2001	Outstanding Actor in a Feature Film	L.I.E.	Won	

=== International Online Cinema Awards ===
Year	Award/Category	Work	Result	Ref.
2007	Best Supporting Actor	There Will Be Blood	Nominated	

=== Kermode Award ===
Year	Award/Category	Work	Result	Ref.
2014	Best Actor	Love & Mercy	Won	

=== London Film Critics' Circle ===
Year	Award/Category	Work	Result	Ref.
2016	London Film Critics' Circle Award for Actor of the Year	Love & Mercy	Nominated	

=== National Board of Review ===
Year	Award/Category	Work	Result	Ref.
2013	Best Cast	Prisoners	Won	

=== New York Film Critics Online ===
Year	Award/Category	Work	Result	Ref.
2015	Best Actor	Love & Mercy	Won	

=== North Carolina Film Critics Association ===
Year	Award/Category	Work	Result	Ref.
2016	Best Supporting Actor	Love & Mercy	Nominated	

=== San Diego Film Critics Society ===
Year	Award/Category	Work	Result	Ref.
2013	Best Performance by an Ensemble	12 Years a Slave	Nominated	
2013	Best Performance by an Ensemble	Prisoners	Nominated	
2015	Best Supporting Actor	Love & Mercy	Nominated	

=== San Francisco Film Critics Circle ===
Year	Award/Category	Work	Result	Ref.
2015	Best Actor	Love & Mercy	Won	
2015	Best Supporting Actor	Love & Mercy	Nominated	

=== Satellite Awards ===
Year	Award/Category	Work	Result	Ref.
2016	Best Supporting Actor – Motion Picture	Love & Mercy	Nominated	

=== Saturn Awards ===
Year	Award/Category	Work	Result	Ref.
2022	Best Supporting Actor in a Film	The Batman	Nominated	

=== Stockholm International Film Festival ===
Year	Award/Category	Work	Result	Ref.
2001	Stockholm International Film Festival Award for Best Actor	L.I.E.	Won	

=== St. Louis Film Critics Association ===
Year	Award/Category	Work	Result	Ref.
2014	Best Supporting Actor	Love & Mercy	Nominated	

=== Village Voice Film Poll Awards ===
Year	Award/Category	Work	Result	Ref.
2007	Best Supporting Actor	There Will Be Blood	Nominated	

=== Washington D.C. Area Film Critics Association ===
Year	Award/Category	Work	Result	Ref.
2013	Best Ensemble	12 Years a Slave	Won	
2013	Best Ensemble	Prisoners	Nominated	
2015	Best Supporting Actor	Love & Mercy	Nominated	
