= Marah Lewis =

- Guiding Light character
- Kimberly J. Brown as Marah Lewis (2006)
- Portrayed by: Nicole Otto (1987–1988); Ashley Peldon (1988–1991); Kimberly J. Brown (1993–1998, 2006); Lauren C. Mayhew (1998–1999); Laura Bell Bundy (1999–2001); Lindsey McKeon (2001–2004)
- Duration: 1987–1991; 1993–2004; 2006
- First appearance: 1987
- Last appearance: December 1, 2006
- Created by: Sheri Anderson and Joseph D. Manetta
- Introduced by: Joe Willmore (1988); Jill Farren Phelps (1993); Ellen Wheeler (2006)
- Laura Bell Bundy as Marah Lewis (1999–2001)

- Lindsey McKeon as Marah Lewis (2001–2004)
In-universe information
- Occupation: Fashion designer
- Parents: Josh Lewis; Reva Shayne
- Stepparents: Jeffrey O'Neill
- Siblings: Dylan Lewis (Guiding Light); Dylan Lewis (maternal half-brother); Joshua "Shayne" Lewis (brother); Jonathan Randall, (maternal half-brother); Colin O'Neill (maternal half-brother); Ava Peralta (step-sister)
- Other relatives: Harlan Billy "H.B." Lewis I (paternal grandfather, deceased); Martha Lewis (paternal grandmother, deceased); Hawk Shayne (maternal grandfather); Sarah Shayne (maternal grandmother, deceased); Patrica "Trish" Lewis (paternal aunt); Harlan Billy "Billy" Lewis III (paternal uncle); Russell "Rusty" Shayne (maternal uncle); Roxanne "Roxie" Shayne (maternal aunt); Cassandra "Cassie" Rae Lewis (maternal aunt); Susan 'Daisy' Lemay (niece); Sarah Randall (niece); Henry Cooper Camalletti (nephew); Melinda Sue "Mindy" Lewis (paternal cousin); Harlan Billy "Bill" Lewis III (paternal cousin); Tammy Winslow (maternal cousin, deceased); Roger Joshua "R.J." Jessup (maternal cousin); William "Will" Winslow (maternal adopted cousin)

Marah Lewis is a fictional character on the CBS daytime soap opera, Guiding Light. The character is the daughter of the popular supercouple, Josh Lewis and Reva Shayne. Marah was born on-screen in June 1987, but this was subsequently revised to 1985 and 1983 when she turned three years old in 1988 and sixteen years old in 1999 respectively.

Six actresses have regularly portrayed the character, the most recent being Lindsey McKeon, who garnered two nominations for Outstanding Younger Actress at the Daytime Emmy Awards in 2002 and 2003. Ashley Peldon and Kimberly J. Brown each also garnered a nomination in the same category in 1991 and 1996 respectively. The latter reprised the role briefly in 2006. Days of Our Lives actor Martha Madison auditioned twice for the role—once in 2001 and again in 2009. Speaking on her latter audition, she revealed: "The second time, it seemed like I was probably going to get it, and then they canceled the show the next week."

Marah currently resides in Paris, France, working as a fashion designer. Marah has four brothers, Dylan Lewis, Shayne Lewis, Jonathan Randall, and Colin O'Neill. The character's last regular appearance on the show was in April 2004.

== Storyline ==
Marah Lewis's life was surrounded by controversy from the day she was born in 1987. Since tests, forged by Will Jeffries, made it seem as if she was the absent Kyle Sampson's daughter, she was raised alone by her mother, Reva Shayne. It wasn't until 1989 that the truth came out that Joshua Lewis was her biological father.

Soon after this revelation, young Marah was kidnapped by Will and placed in the care of Will's mother, Mrs. Anita Ebarra. Luckily, Marah was soon found by Josh's ex-wife, Sonni, Soon after, Marah was on hand to watch as her parents finally married.

Unfortunately, in June 1990, months after the birth of Marah's brother, Shayne Lewis, Reva, suffering from a severe case of postpartum depression, drove her car off a bridge during a family vacation in Florida and was assumed dead. Devastated by her mother's apparent death, Marah, who had just started kindergarten, bonded with her nanny, Harley Cooper.

In January 1991, when Josh moved to Italy to search for Reva (who was suspected to be alive and living there), Marah soon followed him, along with Shayne and their grandmother, Sarah.

In late 1993, Marah returned to Springfield with Josh and Shayne. In 1995, Marah was delighted to have a new mother in Josh's fiancée, Annie Dutton. That same year, Marah had an appendectomy and saw a vision of Reva. Later, after Josh's and Annie's wedding, Marah was shocked to come face to face with the real Reva.

Apparently, Reva had been suffering from amnesia for the past five years. Leery of getting hurt, Marah chose Annie over her own mother. When Shayne followed Marah's example, Reva promised to stay out of Marah's life and married Buzz Cooper in March 1996.

In September 1997, Marah was devastated by the death of her beloved grandfather, HB, and gave the eulogy at his funeral. By this time, Marah had lowered her defenses and let Reva, into her life again and watched happily as her parents remarried in 1999. For once, Marah finally had what she always wanted: a complete family.

However, her world was shattered when she learned that Reva had another child, Jonathan, in San Cristobel while living there with amnesia. Resentful of her mother's "other family", Marah again distanced herself from Reva. Marah and Shayne went to Paris for a while and when a sixteen year old Marah returned, she came to terms with the situation. Unfortunately, Josh and Reva soon separated and, though not willing to accept her parents' separation at first, in time Marah learned to deal with it.

Meanwhile, when Marah was attacked by an aggressive boy, Olivia Spencer rescued her and Marah began to confide in her. However all that changed when Olivia became the new woman in Josh's life in 2000. A resentful Marah refused to accept the situation and made no secret of her dislike of Olivia, yet all of her protests fell on deaf ears when she tried to reunite her parents.

Meanwhile, a rebellious Marah was chafing under her mother's rules and started to create bootleg CD's of concerts of the band New Ground with Susan Lemay and Sam Spencer, with help from mobster Tony Santos. The friends were finally arrested by the FBI and would have even been charged if the band hadn't have dropped the charges.

About this time, Marah started dating Tony, to Sam's dismay and her parents' disapproval. Defying her parents, Marah continued seeing Tony and the pair fell in love. When Josh and Olivia got engaged, Marah was horrified and Olivia blackmailed her with knowledge of her relationship with Tony.

The day of Josh's and Olivia's wedding in January 2001, Marah disappeared, hoping to stop the wedding. Unfortunately, the wedding went on without her. When Tony discovered that Marah had used him to get back at her parents, he left her and Marah t turned to Sam. When the mafia kidnapped her, Sam and Tony joined forces to rescue Marah.

Marah and Tony reunited and Tony started shedding his bad-boy image since he wanted Marah's family to approve of him. However, this "new and improved" Tony wasn't exactly who Marah wanted. When Tony refused to have sex with her, claiming that they should wait longer, she got offended and broke off the relationship. Marah then began dating Sam again and, not long after, enrolled in Springfield University where her roommate was Catalina Quesada.

Marah and Cat hated each other, mostly because Cat hated how Marah played Sam and Tony against each other. Though Marah tried to maintain a relationship with Sam, it was obvious that Tony was still under her skin. When she learned that it was Tony, and not Sam, who saved Josh from prison by revealing that the photo implicating him was a forgery, Marah realized she'd wronged him terribly.

She left Sam and confessed to Tony she loved him but, by this time, Cat was in love with Tony and did everything in her power to hold onto him, even sending Marah's essay about virginity to the entire student body who then mocked Marah and attacked her verbally.

Mortified, Marah confided in her old friend, Ben Reade, who had returned to town. Soon, the pair started dating. Unfortunately, Ben's intentions weren't pure: he was only using her to win a bet about whether he could deflower her. Though she liked Ben, Marah couldn't stop thinking about Tony.

Marah's dislike of Cat intensified, in 2000, when she learned that Cat was pregnant with Tony's baby and the couple was getting married.

Despite Ben's pleas to just forget about Tony, Marah couldn't and asked Tony if they could continue their friendship. Knowing he couldn't just be friends with Marah, Tony refused since he had a family to think about.

Later, Marah learned a startling fact: Catalina was no longer pregnant; she miscarried her baby and kept the news from everyone! Desperate to keep Tony from marrying Cat, Marah rushed to tell him the news.

Moments after the couple had said their vows, Marah burst in but before she could tell Tony the truth, Cat faked labor pains and Marah was hustled out by bodyguards. Catalina and Tony planned to go on a honeymoon to Hawaii a few days later. However, Marah refused to give up, and, one night when Tony's grandmother, Maria, had conveniently cleared the house of all guards, arrived at the mansion.

She and Catalina bitterly argued, with Marah ripping the St. Anthony's necklace off Catalina's neck because Tony had originally planned to buy it for her.

Cat ran upstairs to her room to call the police. Marah followed her, and they struggled. Cat shoved her away, then watched in disbelief as Marah hit her head on a fireplace column.

When Marah awoke, Cat was dead, and Tony was telling her that he'd take care of everything. Though her father (who believed that Tony killed Cat) warned her to stay away from Tony, she insisted that he was innocent and visited an oddly silent Tony in prison.

Though a small part of her believed that he may have killed Cat, Marah continued to support him, despite his efforts to push her away.

Tony, on the other hand, feared that the more time Marah spent with him, the more likely it would be that the police would realize she killed Catalina (which he erroneously believed). So he pushed her away, cruelly insulting her and telling her he had killed Catalina.

Around this time, Ben, in an attempt to turn over a new leaf, told Marah of the bet to take her virginity from her, and Marah threw him out of her life. Feeling disillusioned by all the men she'd let herself trust, Marah got drunk and wandered around by the docks where Tony's friend, Romeo Jones, found her.

Romeo, who was obsessed with having everything Tony had, played on Marah's vulnerabilities and brought her back to Infierno with him. The next morning, Marah dreamt she had spent the night with Tony.

Instead, the harsh light of day showed her that her lover was a mostly clothed, slumbering Romeo. Marah ran home and tried to shower away the memories of losing her much-cherished virtue in a drunken one-night stand to a man she had no feelings for.

Unfortunately for her, Romeo visited shortly after, expecting another tryst. Marah reacted angrily until she recognized the necklace he was wearing, which was the necklace she had in her hand the night of Catalina's murder! Seeing that he must be the killer, Marah began playing a dangerous game, cozying up to him, leading him on, and building up his ego.

Meanwhile, she tried to stay away from Tony, but love got the best of her, and she went into hiding with him after he escaped from jail. Romeo tracked them down at the carousel, and Marah knocked Tony out so that Romeo would take her instead.

Romeo left to see Danny and Carmen about business, and when he returned, Marah got the upper hand and tried to force the truth out of him. The situation turned ugly, with Tony arriving to stop any violence, and the police arrived and arrested both men for Catalina's murder, since both accused the other of doing it.

A few days later, Romeo mysteriously confessed to the murder (Carmen had made him), and Tony was cleared of all charges. He and Marah were free to be together. What kept Marah from fully sharing in the joy was the time bomb hanging over her head regarding her one-nighter with Romeo. Marah's life exploded, when Tony learned the truth from Romeo.

In the back office at Infierno, Marah confirmed the news. Tony, livid, almost raped her before he stopped himself. Furious, she stripped down to her underwear, screamed at him to take her, and then ran out of the room in tears.

Marah's only real source of comfort were her parents, but even this was not to last. After Richard Winslow, Marah's Aunt Cassie's husband, died, Reva later told Shayne and Marah that she pulled the plug on his life support system at his request. Though she explained that he had asked her to do this, Marah was unable to accept her mother's actions.

As Reva was arrested for murder, Marah drew away from Reva and became very close to Cassie, because she felt that Cassie needed her more than Reva.. As summer passed, Marah began to forgive Tony for what he had done to her, since she had never stopped loving him. In late August, the pair was trapped on a fishing boat but their renewed closeness was dealt a major setback when Tony thought he saw a worker manhandling her and began beating the man up.

Meanwhile, Reva pled guilty to killing Richard, in order to spare Cassie any more pain, and was sentenced to two years in prison.

Marah had to basically become Reva during her absence, and during a phone call lit into Reva about how crushing her life had become. Fortunately, Reva was released and pardoned after a few weeks, and Marah went back to her old life. By now, Tony had managed to reign in his anger and expressed his genuine remorse and regret to Marah. Marah decided to forgive him and they had slowly rekindled their romance.

Her family was not thrilled, especially Josh, who went out of his way to express his disgust with her decision. Though Marah stood by Tony, when Reva was harassed by a stalker, Marah mistakenly suspected Tony of the crime. However, Tony eventually earned the Lewis's trust enough to serve as Reva's bodyguard and the stalker was later revealed to be Alexandra Spaulding.

In the course, of the crisis, Tony and Marah grew closer than ever and finally had sex in the spring of 2003. Late that summer, Tony's violent past came back to haunt them when Marah saw snapshots sent to Eden August showing Tony beating up a woman. Confronted with the photos, Tony told Marah it happened the previous summer after he'd attacked her.

Driving for hours, Tony ended up in Chicago where he got drunk and let himself be seduced by a woman. Realizing the woman was setting him up for blackmail, Tony supposedly beat the woman to a pulp, although he had no recollection of doing so.

Already on edge due to the revelation that Ben was a murderer, Marah couldn't deal with Tony's violent past, believing that he'd fall back into it, and she left him and moved back home.

Not long after, Marah met Sandy Foster, one half of "Sandy and the Mole", the shock jocks that Marah frequently listened to on campus radio. After Marah called in the station, berating the Mole for his malicious comments about her family and friends, Sandy arrived at her door and thanked her for calling in.

Upon learning that Dean Clayton Boudreau removed the disk jockey's from the air, Marah decided to stage a protest on the grounds that Sandy and the Mole had a right to speak their minds. During the protest, Marah suddenly realized that she had been unfair to Tony and asked his forgiveness. However, to her surprise, Tony refused to go back to her on the grounds that she was right about him. Confused as to why Tony was pushing her away, Marah continued her friendship with Sandy.

Though she had inquired about the Mole on several occasions, Sandy always gave excuses as to why he wasn't able to help in the protests. Then one night, Marah learned Sandy's secret—the mole was a puppet! His secret out, he confessed to her that as a child, he invented the alter ego of "the mole" as an outlet for him to talk back to his domineering father. According to him, the mole was brave and could say anything about anybody.

After using the mole as a young teen to entertain his friends, eventually the routine turned into an outlet to discuss other events and led to his career as a shock jock. Understanding, Marah tried to convince him to reveal his secret, but Sandy refused stating that if he did, his credibility would be over. Willing to keep his secret, Marah soon developed feelings for Sandy.

However he adamantly refused to return the affections. Later, the reason for Sandy's reluctance was revealed—he was Reva's son, Jonathan! Feeling betrayed, Marah turned away from Sandy and refused to accept his offers of friendship. Much later, it would be learned that Sandy was an imposter.

Meanwhile, late that year, Marah found herself visited by a mysterious woman who later named herself as Carrie. Carrie had already visited Michelle Bauer and later visited Marina Cooper. After appearing to all three girls, she asked them to ask their fathers (or grandfather) about Maryanne Caruthers.

Although all three girls didn't like the idea of setting up the men because of stranger, they were intrigued and asked. All the men denied knowing who Maryanne was but it was obvious that they were lying since they were visibly shaken. Carrie appeared again and told them that the town of Springfield was founded by Maryanne's grandfather, Horace Caruthers who built the town on a series of old tunnels.

The Caruthers family also, with help from the Spaulding family, founded the museum where Marah lived and said that clues could be found there. The girls found a white powdery substance in the Egyptology exhibit and Carrie told the girls that this substance gave Maryanne her wealth. Maryanne's father licensed the powder to Spaulding Pharmaceuticals.

Carrie, who had described Maryanne as an innocent woman, mentioned that Maryanne's fortune led to her downfall. Carrie then revealed that Maryanne's car went off a bridge and told the girls to find the vehicle. The girls figured out that the bridge must have been Cutter's Bridge and Marina secretly went to the police station to find police records to find out about the accident.

Oddly, there were no records, which led the girls to conclude that Maryanne's death was covered up. Afterwards, Carrie appeared to the girls again and told them to find Maryanne's grave. Now knowing that Maryanne died in 1977, the girls proceeded to get their fathers/grandfather to open up about what they were doing in the 1970s. However, when they brought up the name Maryanne Caruthers, again the men clammed up and told the girls never to mention that name again.

Though the girls were wary of hurting their fathers/grandfather by continuing on in the investigation, Carrie convinced them that it would be better if the truth were revealed. In the midst of this investigation, Marah found herself unexpectedly attracted to District Attorney Jeffrey O'Neill, a man several years her senior.

Though warned to stay away from Jeffrey by her mother, Aunt Cassie, Sandy, and even Jeffrey's former girlfriend Beth Raines, Marah set her sights on seducing Jeffrey, despite (or maybe because of) his own reluctance. From Thanksgiving to New Year's, Marah shamelessly flirted with Jeffrey. Though he tried to reject her advances, it was obvious that he found her very appealing and finally on New Year's Eve, he caved in to her advances.

Meanwhile, in early 2004, Carrie finally related the tale about what happened on Oct. 17th, 1977. That night, the men spiked Maryanne's drink with a drug to loosen her up and went for a drive. Suddenly there was an accident and the car went off the bridge and into the river. Though all five men made it out of the river, Maryanne couldn't be found.

Wanting to preserve their lives, Alan persuaded the others to move on with their lives and forget that they ever knew a woman named Maryanne Caruthers. After recounting the tale, Carrie told the disbelieving girls to confront their fathers/grandfather and deliver a letter to them in a pick envelope. Ed was rattled when Michelle suddenly recounted the entire story of Maryanne and handed him a pick envelope. Unnerved and agitated, Ed refused to take the letter and tore it up!

Finally he became so rattled and Michelle's insistent questions that he slapped Michelle! Finally realizing that their little investigation was doing more harm than good, Michelle went to Marah and Marina and convinced them to snoop around Carrie's secret room below the museum and started looking for clues as to why exactly Carrie wanted to dredge this up.

They were caught in the act and Carrie revealed the truth—Maryanne had one surviving relative an aunt, Caroline Caruthers! Upon hearing the name they realized that Carrie was Caroline and she was the witness at the bridge who was too afraid to speak up. Not long after, each of the girls found themselves in danger. First, Michelle almost died from gas inhalation at her home. As she slipped into unconsciousness, Michelle suddenly saw Carrie who looked as if she was about to smother Michelle.

Fortunately, Michelle was rescued by Danny and Bill, and Carrie claimed that she'd had been trying to save Michelle by turning off the gas valve.

At almost the same time, Marah was unsettled when an old teddy bear kept cropping up despite her attempts to put it away and she found it with a razor blade, and finally Marina was caught in a cave in when she was asked by Carrie to go into the tunnels under the museum.

After the incident with Marina, who was saved by Michelle and Marina, the girls finally figured out that Carrie was out for vengeance and instead of helping the men they cared about, they were only making things worse. With this realization, the girls finally stood up to Carrie and told her to leave them alone, or else. Not long after, Carrie summoned the girls to her one last time, asking them to come to the Fairgrounds for a memorial service for Maryanne.

Unfortunately, Carrie's motives were far more diabolical. Unbeknownst to anyone, the rings Carrie gave the girls rings to wear that were tainted with a drug called Antimonius. Arriving at the Fairgrounds under the influence of the drug, the girls, in a fog, entered the hall of mirrors. Then came a startling turn of events: Dazed and confused the girls, wandered the hall and became aware that the men were there also. Scared and ill, the girls cried out for the men to help them.

Meanwhile, Carrie finally announced her plan to the men—one of the girls would be killed in place of Maryanne; they would have to choose. Horrified by her insanity, the men realized that the girls, who seemed in a dazed state, were in the Hall of Mirrors, but had trouble locating because the mirrors kept them from seeing what was real and what wasn't. Although Ed was able to locate Marina and Michelle and lead them outside to safety, Marah remained missing for a while longer. Then came a startling chain of events.

Carrie suddenly appeared brandishing a gun, poised to shoot. However, because of the mirrors no one could tell what was the real Carrie. Although Buzz got out his gun (that he brought at Alan's insistence, so that they could take care of the threat), he was caught unaware by Carrie who shot him! Then Carrie pointed her gun at Josh and was set to fire when a shot rang out, apparently killing Carrie!

Shot in the back, Carrie fell through the trap door at the bottom of the Hall and her body was rushed away by the river below. Seeing a dazed Marah holding the smoking gun, Josh decided to take the blame and there and then, he and the others created an elaborate story about how he shot Carrie in self-defense.

Josh went to the police and confessed to murdering Carrie, who he painted as a deranged woman angry about not getting a job, in self-defense. Shocked at her father's confession, a very confused Marah knew there was something she was forgetting but couldn't remember. Mere days later, she remembered that SHE shot and killed Carrie.

Determined that her father wouldn't take the punishment for a crime she committed, Marah went to the police station and confessed. Not long after, Reva helped close the door on the entire Maryanne Caruthers situation when, using her psychic visions, she learned that not only had Carrie faked her death, but had been the one who caused Maryanne's death that fateful night in 1977 when she strangled Maryanne, who had washed ashore at the other side of the riverbank. Days later, while struggling to deal with the harrowing ordeal, Marah received fantastic news from her cousin Mindy.

Apparently, Mindy showed some designers in Paris Marah's designs and one of them was interested in hiring her. Immediately, Marah's maudlin mood vanished and she became hopeful for the future again. Although, she hoped that Jeffrey would accompany her to Paris, he backed out and Marah left town to forge an exciting new career.

The summer of 2006, while Marah was in New York on business, Reva arranged for a family reunion. However, conspicuous in his absence was Josh. Months later, the pair divorced. In November, Marah returned to town and arranged for both of her parents to come to Towers so they could talk.

By this point, Reva finally confessed that she had been secretly battling cancer for months but was now in remission. Her secrecy, though intended to spare her family, succeeded in driving Josh into Cassie's arms. Though Marah tried to convince her parents that they could fix things and get back together like they always did, Reva and Josh didn't think their relationship could be salvaged this time.

Meanwhile, days after finally meeting her kid brother, Jonathan, Marah spent a tense Thanksgiving with Cassie and Josh. Unnerved by the fact that Reva had refused to come, Marah lashed out. Though she tried to convince Josh that he should be with Reva, he merely stated that the family they were no longer existed. Days later, after saying goodbye to Reva, a regretful Marah made plans to leave. Though Reva suggested that she move back to Springfield, Marah stated that she would only return if her parents were back together. The following year, Josh finally married Cassie but both Marah and Shayne refused to attend the ceremony.

== Actor history ==
- Nicole Otto (1987 - 1988)
- Ashley Peldon (November 30, 1988 - March 27, 1991)
- Kimberly J. Brown (December 22, 1993 - July 13, 1998; November 17 - December 1, 2006)
- Lauren C. Mayhew (August 4, 1998 - June 23, 1999)
- Laura Bell Bundy (October 14, 1999 - October 29, 2001)
- Lindsey McKeon (November 6, 2001 - April 19, 2004)

== Family and relationships ==
=== Parents ===
- Joshua "Josh" Lewis (father)
- Reva Shayne O'Neill (mother)
- Jeffrey O'Neill (stepfather)

=== Sibling(s) ===
- Dylan Lewis (maternal half-brother)
- Shayne Lewis (brother)
- Jonathan Randall (maternal half-brother)
- Colin O'Neill (maternal half-brother)
- Ava Peralta (stepsister)
- Dinah Marler (sister-in-law)

=== Marital status ===
- Single

=== Past marriage(s) ===
- None

=== Other relatives ===
- Harlan Billy "H.B." Lewis I (paternal grandfather)
- Martha Lewis (paternal grandmother, deceased)
- Hawk Shayne (maternal grandfather)
- Sarah O'Neal Shayne (maternal grandmother, deceased)
- Harlan Billy "Billy" Lewis II (paternal uncle)
- Patricia "Trish" Lewis (paternal aunt)
- Russell "Rusty" Shayne (maternal uncle)
- Roxanne "Roxie" Shayne (maternal aunt)
- Cassandra "Cassie" Rae (maternal aunt)
- Susan "Daisy" Lemay (niece)
- Henry Cooper Camalletti (nephew)
- Sarah Randall (niece)
- Melinda Sue "Mindy" Lewis (paternal cousin)
- Dylan Lewis (paternal cousin)
- Harlan Billy "Bill" Lewis III (paternal cousin)
- Tammy Winslow (maternal cousin, deceased)
- Roger Joshua "R.J." Winslow (maternal cousin)
- William "Will" Winslow (maternal adopted cousin)

=== Flings and relationships ===
- Maxwell "Max" Nickerson (dated)
- Chad [Last Name Unknown] (dated)
- Samuel "Sam" Spencer (dated)
- Antonio "Tony" Santos (lovers, deceased)
- Benjamin "Ben" Reade (dated, deceased)
- Henry "Romeo" Jones (one night stand)
