= Lauren Mayhew =

American singer, actress and former ring announcer for ECW

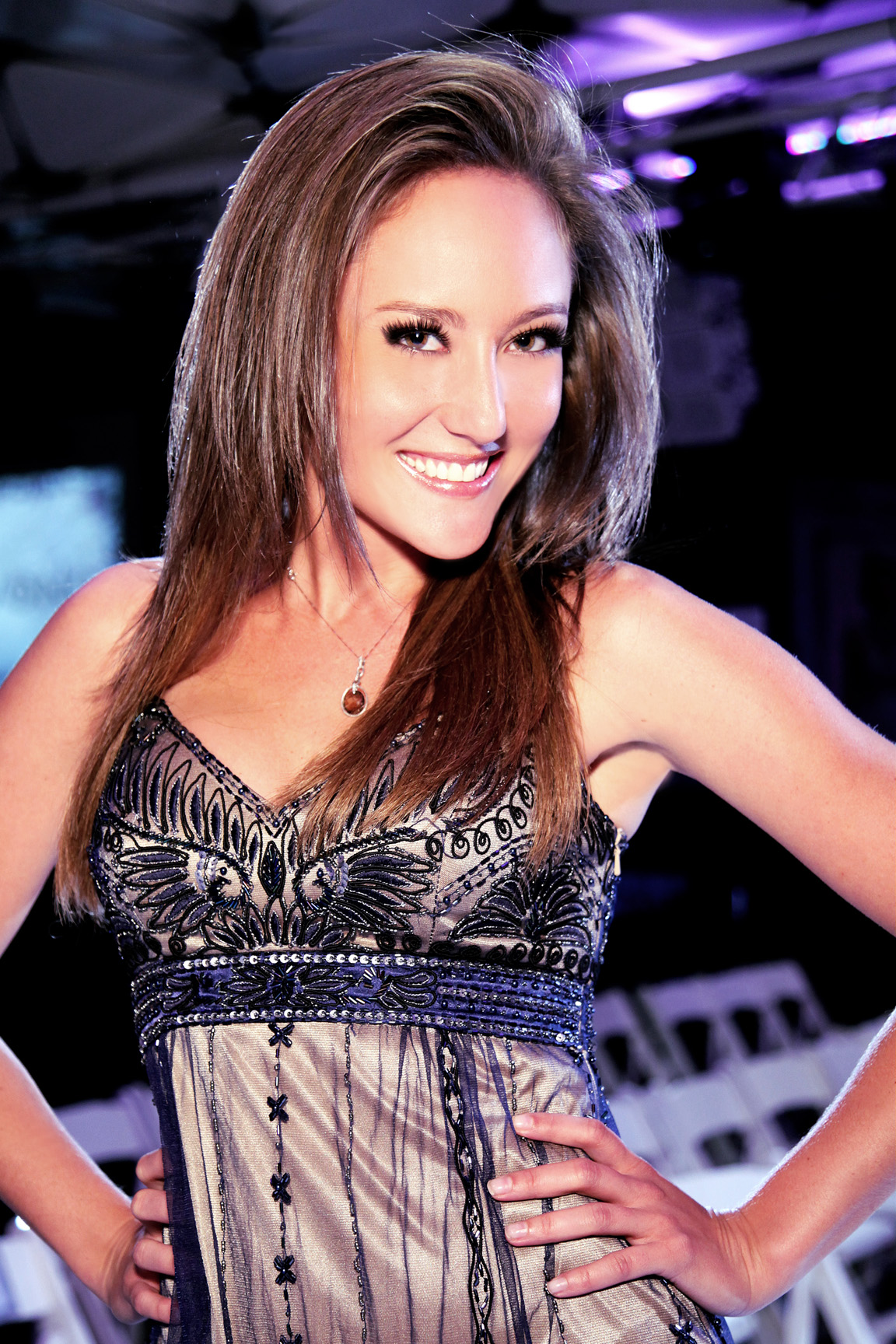
- Lauren Mayhew in Los Angeles, California on September 21, 2013
- Occupations: Actress, singer, ring announcer
- Years active: 1998–present
- Parent(s): David Mayhew; Sharon Mayhew
- Website: http://www.laurenmayhew.com/

Lauren Mayhew is an American singer, actress and former ring announcer for WWE's ECW brand.

== Life and career ==
Mayhew was born to David Mayhew, an orthopaedic surgeon and Sharon Mayhew, a nurse. She has a sister named Briana. At the age of 8, she starred in the PBS series, The Reppies. At the age of 9 she was a finalist in the national Wilhemnia contest. A judge, Marilyn Zitner, who was a manager in New York, signed her. She booked the role of Marah Lewis on Guiding Light.

Mayhew took a break from acting and signed with Sony Records to be part of the group PYT, a girl group composed of Mayhew and three of her childhood friends. PYT went on to release an album and tour with Destiny's Child, NSYNC, and Britney Spears. Mayhew performed at the preshow for the Super Bowl, and has been featured in numerous magazines with PYT. She has also appeared in music videos with Mandy Moore, Faith Hill, and two of her own music videos with PYT. After PYT broke up, she joined her former bandmate Lydia Bell in a new group called "Turning Point".

In her feature film debut, New Line Cinema's Raise Your Voice, Mayhew starred as Hilary Duff's arch-rival "Robin," where she played the role of a cynical and malicious diva. She later appeared in the direct-to-video movie American Pie Presents: Band Camp as Arianna. She has also guest starred on such shows as: CSI: Crime Scene Investigation, CSI: Miami, Law & Order, Joan of Arcadia, Medical Investigation, and had a recurring role for one season on NBC's drama American Dreams and Showtime's Dexter.

Mayhew is involved with The Alliance for Eating Disorders Awareness, a charitable organization in helping to prevent against eating disorders. Currently, she has released singles, "Renegade" through Tipsy Records and "Don't Cry" through Artists Intelligence Agency. She graduated from UCLA in Los Angeles.

Mayhew began working for the World Wrestling Entertainment (WWE) professional wrestling promotion as a ring announcer for its ECW brand during the October 6, 2009 episode of ECW. In late November 2009, Mayhew's short-term contract with WWE expired and was not renewed, as the two parties could not come to an agreement for a longer-term contract.

Mayhew also writes and licenses her music to film and TV. She has had songs on NBC's The Voice, Lifetime's Dance Moms, MTV's The Hills, E Network's Giulianna and Bill, Universal's Bring It On: In It to Win It, a national commercial for Klondike Bar, and assorted other works.

Mayhew also released a song called, "What Is Love." The music video features UFC celebrity athletes such as Urijah Faber and was debuted on FOX Sports 1 UFC Tonight program. The video was picked up by over 50 blogs and TV outlets. An interview was even featured on the homepage of FOX SPORTS website. Mayhew created this song with Belgium production team Highbreeze.

Mayhew can also be seen acting and hosting. In September 2014, she joined the cast of TheStream.TV to host The Flash After Show for them, which airs every Tuesday. She also starred in a feature film called Searching for Katie which was released in 2014 and a new web series called Escort, where she plays the leading lady, Em Wilson.

In 2017, in collaboration with the Italian DJ and producer Niky G, she released the single "Dead Awake".

In 2018, Mayhew was asked to be an Official Billboard Dance DJ Reporter. She also became a resident DJ for TAO Group's largest nightclub properties in NYC: Marquee and Lavo.

In 2019, Mayhew started a side project with West Palm Beach based female DJ, Chanel Claire, called Deuces Wild. The pair secured a residency at Park MGMs' 'On The Record' nightclub and Jemma Pool in Vegas. They are managed by Blackout Artists. In this same year Mayhew also booked a series regular role in DreamWorks' animated series "Trollstopia" (from the Trolls franchise). The show debuted Nov 19th, 2020 on Hulu and PeacockTV.

== Discography ==
Singles

- "What Is Love" (2014)
- "Danger Zone" – Noah Kickback & Lauren Mayhew (2015)
- "Wake Up" (2017)
- "One More Try" (DJ Infinite Sole remix) (2013)
- "Frequency" – A-leo & Lauren Mayhew (2016)
- "Shadow" feat. Ryon Lawford (2016)
- "Shark In The Water" – Robert Abigail, Wildvibes & Lauren Mayhew (2016)
- "I'll Be" – RUBYCK feat. Lauren Mayhew (2016)
- "Dead Awake" - Niky G & Lauren Mayhew feat. Phaasm (2017)
- "Renegade" – Kastra & Lauren Mayhew (2018)
- "Feels Good" – Keenan Cahill feat. Lauren Mayhew (2018)
- "Hush" – Catdealers X Lauren Mayhew (2018)
- "Shockwave" – Lauren Mayhew & Audax (2019)
- "Lies" – Lauren Mayhew, Kymber McClay, and INViDA (2020)
- "We Are Home" – Lauren Mayhew & Mariline (2020)
- "BOYS" – Lauren Mayhew & INViDA (2021)

Albums

- Mayhem (2006)

== Filmography ==
Year	Film/Show	Role	Notes
1999	Guiding Light	Marah Lewis	August 4, 1998 – June 23, 1999
2000	Safe Harbor	Sandy	"Can't Touch That"
2003	Law & Order	Melissa Gelson	"Girl Most Likely"
2003	American Dreams	Carol Henley	3 episodes
2003	Real Access	Host	The N
2004	Raise Your Voice	Robin Childers	
2006	Medical Investigation	Sudie Miller	"Spiked"
2006	Joan of Arcadia	Elle	"The Rise & Fall of Joan Girardi"
2006	CSI: Crime Scene Investigation	Candice Mosti	"4x4"
2006	CSI: Miami	Stephanie	"Under Suspicion"
2006	American Pie Presents: Band Camp	Arianna	
2007	In the Mix	Guest	as herself
2008	Private High Musical	Ashley Slutsky	Web series (YouTube)
2009	Valley Peaks	Stacy	"Welcome to the VP" (Season 1, Episode 1)
2009	Frat Party	Kelly	post-production
2009	WWE ECW	Ring Announcer	as Herself
2012	Pageant vs. Playmate		
2012	Static		"Pilot"
2012	The Trace	Jess	post-production
2012	Dexter	Melanie Garrett	"Buck the System"
2012	Diva Diaries	Steffanie	"Pilot"
2013	Ashley	Dr. Hall	
2014	Escort	Em Wilson	Web Series
2014	Eternal Salvation(film)	Winter	
2015	The Flash After Show	Lauren	TV show
2016	Uncharted 4: A Thief's End	Hero Brute Female Sidekick (Multiplayer) (voice)	as Lauren Mayhew
2016	People You May Know	Selena	
2018	9-1-1	Melissa	"Point of Origin"
2018	Red Dead Redemption II	The Local Pedestrian Population (voice)	
2019	Among the Shadows	Dream Girl Voice (voice)	
2020–2022	Trolls: TrollsTopia	Val Thundershock (voice)	Main Role
2021	Trolls: Holiday in Harmony	Val Thundershock (voice)	
2021	The Blacklist	Jean	"Dr. Roberta Sand, PhD (No. 153)"
