= The Riddler: Year One =

Limited comic book series published by DC Comics

- Cover page of The Riddler: Year One #1 by Bill Sienkiewicz (October 2022).

Publication information
- Publisher: DC Comics (Black Label)
- Schedule: Bimonthly
- Format: Limited series
- Genre: Superhero
- Publication date: October 2022 – August 2023
- No. of issues: 6
- Main character: Riddler

Creative team
- Written by: Paul Dano
- Artist: Stevan Subic
- Letterer: Clayton Cowles
- Editors: Jim Chadwick; Chris Conroy

Collected editions
- Hardcover: ISBN 1779523068

The Riddler: Year One is a psychological thriller comic book limited series based on the DC Comics character the Riddler. The six-issue series—written by Paul Dano and illustrated by Stevan Subic—is a tie-in prequel to the film The Batman (2022), in which Dano also played Edward Nashton / the Riddler, with the series focusing on the character's life and his descent into criminality before the events of the film. It was published bimonthly under DC's adult-oriented Black Label imprint from October 25, 2022, to August 23, 2023.

== Plot ==
Soon after his birth, Edward Nashton is left on the doorstep of the Gotham Orphanage by his mother. Some time later, she is committed to Arkham Asylum, where she eventually dies in an apparent suicide. Edward grows up displaying high intelligence and an interest in puzzles but suffers from harsh conditions due to a lack of funding for the orphanage and bullying from his peers. One day, he performs in a choir with other orphans during Thomas Wayne's announcement to run for mayor and the creation of Renewal, a charitable fund aimed at improving the lives of those in need. When Wayne and his wife are suddenly murdered, Edward feels jealous of their son Bruce because he is rich and everyone's attention is on him. Edward also receives his first rejection letter from the Renewal Program, to which he would keep applying many more times, always with the same result. He ends up being thrown from foster home to foster home, and his mental health and hope for a better future gradually deteriorate, causing him to have hallucinations and develop apathy toward everyone in the city.

As an adult, Edward works as a forensic accountant at Gotham's oldest accounting firm, KTMJ, for five years, following a recommendation from one of his college professors. One day, his boss, Mr. Stone, gives him a ledger to sign off, belonging to the animal shelter New Beginnings. Upon examining it, Edward notices that the shelter makes small payments to the company Waterfront Industries, amounting to exactly $10,000 every week to avoid automatic checks in the financial systems. Suspecting the money might be illegal, Edward brings his discovery to his boss, but Mr. Stone dismisses it as a mistake and threatens to fire him if he continues to investigate.

A day earlier, Edward witnesses Batman save a young woman—Selina Kyle's friend, Annika Koslov—from a thug named Mr. Higgins near the mob club Iceberg Lounge. He becomes obsessed with the vigilante, considering him his inspiration. While attending Higgins's trial, he learns that Higgins works at New Beginnings, and after visiting the shelter, he spots Mr. Stone entering the Iceberg Lounge. Later, Edward sneaks into Mr. Stone's office to double-check New Beginnings' ledger and discovers Waterfront's ledger, which reveals that the illegal money it recently received from New Beginnings was then sent to Renewal as a donation. Secretly conducting further investigation and spying on New Beginnings through its CCTV cameras, Edward learns that the shelter acts as a front for the trafficking of the "drops" narcotics. He later witnesses Mr. Stone and Higgins murder an Asian man named Mr. Joon, whom they had put as a decoy to run the shelter, over accusations of skimming money from their boss Carmine Falcone—money that was actually taken by Higgins to post bail for himself. Shocked, Edward sends the evidence to the police, but to his surprise, they don't respond to the crime. Later, he learns Mr. Joon's daughter, Ana, has been put to take his place. Edward tries to contact her through an anonymous chat to let her know about her father, but she ends the conversation, fearing for her life. Edward decides to investigate Waterfront Industries, which was formerly used by Salvatore Maroni to launder profits from his drops operation, and he realizes someone is still using the company as a front after Maroni's arrest. Outside, he also spots Higgins and the police during a drops buy.

While busy reviewing Wayne Enterprises' accounts for Mr. Stone, Edward simultaneously begins to secretly examine the ledgers related to the companies and individuals represented by KTMJ. To this end, he gains access to the facility where the ledgers are stored with the help of an anonymous online user who presents himself as a security guard. After months of examination, Edward finally realizes that Renewal is also represented by KTMJ and uncovers that the fund has been used to secretly bribe various Gotham officials, including the Mayor, Police Commissioner, and District Attorney. He concludes that Carmine Falcone fully controls Renewal after making a secret deal with Gotham's authorities to imprison his rival Maroni and effectively run the city. Edward also becomes disillusioned with Thomas Wayne after learning that Wayne used his connections with Falcone to silence a journalist intending to reveal secrets about his wife's family's mental health history.

Considering Gotham to be beyond salvation, Edward develops a grand plan to expose and eliminate Falcone along with all his corrupt allies. To this end, he prepares to orchestrate a flood on the day of the mayoral election. Inspired by Batman, he thoroughly develops the costumed persona of "the Riddler" for himself, rents an apartment opposite the Iceberg Lounge, and opens a personal website to attract a community of followers to join him. He also anticipates meeting Batman once more, believing that he has been guiding him in his investigation all this time. In the days leading up to his high-profile murder spree, Edward arranges the death of Higgins and for Ana to leave Gotham as she and her father initially planned. On Halloween, he sends Mr. Stone an email with the recording of Mr. Joon's murder and evidence of the money laundering around Renewal, with the option to resend the message either to his family or his boss Falcone. Stone commits suicide while Edward prepares for his first murder as the Riddler.

== Publication history ==
=== Background and creation ===
During the production of the film The Batman (2022), Paul Dano—who played Edward Nashton / the Riddler in the film—conceived ideas for his character's backstory, which he shared with director Matt Reeves, who encouraged him to develop them into a comic book, though he was hesitant to go ahead with the project. Reeves then contacted DC Comics and told Dano the next day that the publisher was interested in hearing his proposal for a Riddler-centric comic. Dano always envisioned Nashton's backstory as a comic, citing Fyodor Dostoevsky and Thomas Bernhard as influences and enjoyed the "archetypal energy of the images in comics". In March, Reeves and DC had officially announced that Dano would be writing a six-issue limited series titled The Riddler: Year One, with Stevan Subic serving as illustrator. The comic is intended to be a tie-in prequel to The Batman, depicting Nashton's life and descent into criminality prior to the events of The Batman.

Dano said in July that he had not yet finished writing the series, an experience which he described as being "totally incredible". He described his experience working with Subic as being "super collaborative". Dano had written treatments of the overall story and sent them to Subic, to which they collaborated in developing the story together. They had held Zoom meetings, in which Subic shared his screen and showed Dano his layouts. While they discussed the storytelling and eventually continued working, Subic pencilled and Dano continued to write. They would then discuss the story that same month when Dano attended DC's panel at San Diego Comic-Con, where he promoted the series.

The Riddler: Year One introduced "Patrick Parker" to comics as an alias of the Riddler. Originating in 2013 as a hoax edit to the Wikipedia page on the Riddler, the alias' inclusion in The Batman film and the tie-in comic has become an example circular reporting and citogenisis incidents on Wikipedia.

=== Publication ===
The Riddler: Year One was published bimonthly under DC's adult-oriented Black Label imprint beginning on October 25, 2022.

=== Issues ===
Issue	Title	Publication date
#1	"Chapter One: A New Beginning"	October 25, 2022
#2	"Chapter Two: People Lie, Numbers Don't"	December 27, 2022
#3	"Chapter Three: I Know Now What I Must Become"	February 28, 2023
#4	"Chapter Four: There's No Place Like Home"	April 25, 2023
#5	"Chapter Five: Blinded by the Light"	June 27, 2023
#6	"Chapter Six: Judgment Day"	August 23, 2023
