= Pororo, The Racing Adventure =

- Chinese promotional release poster
- Directed by: Young Kyun Park
- Screenplay by: In-Kyun Lee; Eun Sook Kim
- Based on: Pororo the Little Penguin
- Produced by: Il Ho Kim; Hyun Ho Kim
- Starring: Rob Schneider; Drake Bell; Anthony Anderson; Jon Heder; Jerry Trainor; Dallas Lovato; Jay Mohr; Mychal Simka
- Cinematography: Mi Kyung Kim
- Edited by: Young Kyun Park
- Music by: Jae Hak Lee; Young Ho Jun
- Production companies: Leading Investment Co. Ltd.; China ACG GROUP LTD.; China Entertainment Corporation; OCON Studios
- Distributed by: CJ Entertainment (South Korea); China Film Co. (China)
- Release dates: January 23, 2013 (South Korea); January 25, 2013 (China)
- Running time: 79 minutes
- Countries: South Korea; China
- Languages: Korean; Chinese; English
- Box office: US$5.78 million (South Korea)

Pororo, The Racing Adventure
- Traditional Chinese: 波魯魯冰雪大冒險
- Simplified Chinese: 波鲁鲁冰雪大冒险
Transcriptions
Standard Mandarin
- Hanyu Pinyin: Bōlǔlǔ bīngxuě dà màoxiǎn

Pororo, The Racing Adventure (Korean: 뽀로로 극장판 슈퍼썰매 대모험) (also known as The Little Penguin: Pororo's Racing Adventure) is a 2013 animated film directed and edited by Young Kyun Park, with a screenplay by In-Kyun Lee and Eun Sook Kim.

The film is based on the Korean computer-animated television series Pororo the Little Penguin. In 2014, an English dub of the film directed by Mychal Simka and written by Simka, Harry Glennon, and Ross Mihalko was released featuring the voices of Rob Schneider, Drake Bell, Anthony Anderson, Jon Heder, Jerry Trainor, Dallas Lovato, Jay Mohr, and Simka, as well as original songs by Bell and Smash Mouth.

== Plot ==
Pororo and his friends dream of being champions by watching the white tigers win the year prior's Super Sleigh Championship on TV. As they dream of being champions, their friend, Eddy, has built a sleigh for Pororo to drive (which has a lollipop to make the sleigh go super fast). But while Pororo and his friends race their handmade sleighs, Pororo puts the lollipop in the sleigh, which causes it to fly up into the sky, where it crashes into a plane, piloted by Toto and Mango (both of whom are delivering the prize for the Super Sleigh Championship). Toto has to have the plane make an emergency landing.

After landing the plane, Eddy tells Toto and Mango that he can repair the plane so they make it to Northpia, where the race is being held. Pororo then sees that Toto has a medal, thinking that he is a champion. Toto then lies to Pororo and his friends about him being a champion, as Mango is unhappy with Toto lying to the group.

While Eddy repairs the plane, Toto teaches Pororo and his friends how to be champions, by having them run up hills and ride down slopes in buckets. During the slope part of training, Pororo and Crong do a spectacular flip over the others, which really amazes Toto.

Eddy then manages to finish fixing the plane. Toto and Mango then head up to Northpia, while the group hitches a ride with them. As soon as they land, Toto and Mango finish their delivery and stay at a party for the racers, which Pororo and his friends come into. Upon seeing them, Mango tries to warn Toto that the group somehow got to Northpia, unbeknownst to both of them. However, Toto is too busy partying. But during the party, Fufu, a brown bear who was kicked out of the race two years prior for cheating, comes in and tells everyone that he will win the race and that the future of the race will only have brown bears, like him, competing. Pororo then tells him and mentions that Toto is a champion, but Fufu takes the medal and it turns out that Toto is actually a delivery champion, not a racing champion. Upon hearing this, Pororo and his friends are upset by this.

Following the party, Mango confronts Toto on his actions, but Toto denies it, saying that Pororo would forget about it. However, he feels like an idiot for lying to the group that he is a racing champion. The following day, the race is about to begin, as Toto and Mango are in attendance to watch the race. The race begins, but Pororo cannot move. After a boost from his navigator, Petty, he takes off but leaves her behind. Crong then jumps into the sleigh with Pororo, becoming his new navigator, and during the race, Fufu's goons try to tamper with the other racers, but are not successful. Fufu then cheats throughout the race, taking out almost all the competitors, including the white tigers. Pororo and Crong check to see if the white tigers are okay. The white tigers then explain that they need to beat Fufu. During the last few parts of the course, the track caves in, and Pororo and Crong are stuck; Fufu manages to get out by pushing Pororo's sleigh down to a ledge. Pororo and Crong then argue about what happened; meanwhile Toto then comes to give them a lollipop to make the sleigh go fast, which he is successful in doing. Pororo and Crong then catch up to Fufu, but as Fufu tries to wreck them, they do the same flip from when they were training. Pororo then wins the race in a photo finish, and later that night, during the awards ceremony, he and his friends, along with Mango and Toto celebrate the win.

== English dub version ==
The English dub of the film was released on October 6, 2014. It features six original songs including "Beside Myself" and "Everything Just Crazy", both performed by Smash Mouth, "Makes Me Happy" performed by Drake Bell (who also voices the White Tiger), "Bike Crawl" by the Selectrics and "Miracle" by Parker Theory. However, two songs from the original Korean version, specifically "We Are Champions" by Christina and "Sing Sing" by Hyun Ah Jo, have been excluded from the English dub. Additionally, the end credits feature profiles of the characters, which are absent in the original Korean version.

== Voice cast ==
=== Korean voice cast ===
- Sun Lee - Pororo
- Mi Ja Lee - Crong
- Hwan Chin Kim - Poby
- Su Jung Ham - Eddy
- So Young Hong - Loopy
- Hyun Jung Cho - Harry
- Mi Sook Chung - Petty
- Sang Hyun Um - Toto
- Dong Kyun Um - Mango
- Chae Heon Lim - Fufu
- Jang Woo Rhee - Kuku
- Ja Hyoung Koo - White Tiger
- Kwang Ju Jeon - Anchor Nuori
- Jang Won Lee - Anchor Noori
- Heui Choi - Banga Chairman
- Nak Yoon Choi - Mask Ninja A
- Jae Beom Lee - Mask Ninja B
- Ji Hyun Lee - Extra
- Ye Hongbo - Extra
- Huang Lei - Extra

=== Chinese Voice Cast ===
- Zhan Jia - Pororo
- Wu Di - Crong
- Zhoo Wenhe - Poby
- Zhang Anqi - Eddy
- Sun Qian - Loopy
- Zhang Qi - Harry
- Di Linlin - Petty
- Wu Lei - Toto
- Hai Fan - Mango
- Cheng Yuzhu - Fufu
- Meng Xianglong - Kuku
- Guo Yifeng - White Tiger
- Zhao Qianjing - Anchor Nuori
- Zhang Xin - Anchor Noori
- Wang Xiaobing - Banga Chairman
- Guo Yifeng - Mask Ninja A
- Hu Yi - Mask Ninja B
- Long Guanlin - Extra
- Wong Mingyang - Extra

=== English Voice Cast ===
- Rob Schneider as Toto the Turtle
- Drake Bell as the White Tiger
- Anthony Anderson as Fufu the Bear
- Jon Heder as Mango the Turtle
- Jerry Trainor as Walter Featherbottom
- Dallas Lovato as Gucci Bear
- Jay Mohr as Chip Quackers
- Mychal Simka as Walrus the Casting Director
- Jesse Pruett as the Duck
- Walter Masterson as the Wolf
- Additional voices by Ron Fleishman

=== Uncredited English Voice Cast ===
- Dorothy Elias-Fahn as Pororo
- Chris Jai Alex as Poby

It is currently unknown of who voices Crong, Eddy, Loopy, Harry, and Petty.

== Soundtrack ==
- Smash Mouth: "Beside Myself", "Everything Just Crazy"
- Drake Bell: "Makes Me Happy".
- The Selectrics: "Bike Crawl", "Agent Venus Honeytrap".
- Parker Theory: "Miracle"
- Jae Hak Lee: "We Are Champions", "Sing Sing"

== Reception ==
The film grossed US$5.78 million in South Korea.
