= Walter Masterson =

American comedian, actor, journalist and progressive pundit

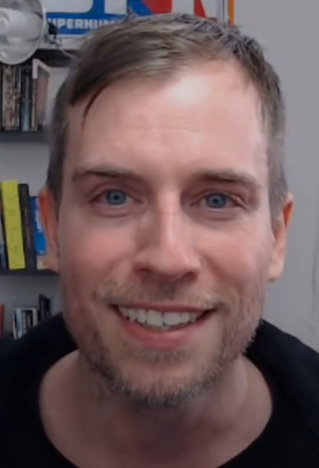
- Masterson in 2022
- Born: 1977 or 1978 (age 47–48); New York City, U.S.
- Occupations: Comedian; Actor; Satirist; Content creator
- Years active: 2006–present
- Political party: Democratic

Instagram information
- Page: Walter Masterson
- Followers: 1.6 million

TikTok information
- Page: waltermasterson
- Followers: 3.2 million

YouTube information
- Channel: waltermasterson
- Genres: Political satire; Social commentary; Comedy
- Subscribers: 522,000
- Views: 131 million
- Last updated: March 23, 2026

Walter Masterson (born 1977 or 1978) is an American comedian, actor, political satirist, and content creator. He is known for producing satirical content at rallies, protests, and political gatherings, often using personas to critique political rhetoric. Having attended the January 6 U.S. Capitol attack to record satirical interviews, Masterson's videos from the day were later used as evidence by the FBI and featured during U.S. House Select Committee on the January 6 Attack.

== Early life and acting career ==
Masterson was born in New York City. He began his acting career with his first audition for the independent film L.I.E. (2001), in which he portrayed "Scott". He later appeared in Bomb the System (2002), playing a graffiti-affiliated high-school alter ego named "Hyste", and in I Believe in America as a young revolutionary. Masterson also appeared in the Law & Order: SVU episode "Trials" (2008) as a drug trial tester named "Jayden Bierce". Additional credits include Sacred Games, The Vortex, The Last Days of April, Trophy Kids, and the pilot series Lights Out for FX. He produced, wrote, and starred in the 2014 web series Llama Cop, alongside an actual llama named Como T. Llama.

== Online satire and activism ==
Masterson creates satirical street interviews and political pranks. His appearances have included rallies, protests, and school board meetings, where he sometimes adopts right-wing personas such as a MAGA Republican or a supporter of Donald Trump. These performances are used to depict and comment on aspects of right-wing populism.

In January 2021, Masterson attended the January 6 United States Capitol attack to record satirical interviews while posing as a journalist for One America News Network. Some of his footage was later miscaptioned online, with claims that he was a disguised liberal instigator. Fact-checks by USA Today and the Associated Press determined the claims were false, confirming his role was limited to comedic commentary and interviews. His videos from the day were later used as evidence by the FBI and featured during United States House Select Committee on the January 6 Attack.

That same year, Masterson attended a Central Bucks School District meeting on book removals and performed a satirical critique. He also confronted Representatives Matt Gaetz and Marjorie Taylor Greene during a photo opportunity, raising questions about allegations against Gaetz.

In April and May 2021, Masterson staged a protest by feeding pigeons at 1211 Avenue of the Americas, outside the headquarters of Fox Corporation in New York City, describing it as a "bird sanctuary".

In 2024, Masterson parodied political aide John McEntee's TikTok videos, which featured conservative arguments delivered while eating; Masterson produced similar videos presenting progressive arguments.

In 2025, Masterson's "tariff talk" videos circulated widely online, combining satire with commentary on economic issues.

== Selected filmography ==
Year	Title	Role / Notes
2001	L.I.E.	Scott
2002	Bomb the System	Hyste
2002	I Believe in America	Revolutionary
2008	Law & Order: Special Victims Unit	Jayden Bierce
2011	Lights Out	Series regular
2012	The Girl's Guide to Depravity	Mark
2012	Archaeology of a Woman	State police officer
2013	Pororo, The Racing Adventure	English voice cast as Wolf
2014	Llama Cop	Joe Bauer
2025	Caper	Walter
