= Stephen M. Ryder =

American film producer

- Born: 1943 (age 82–83); Monticello, New York, U.S.
- Occupations: Screenwriter, producer
- Years active: 1985–present

Stephen M. Ryder (born 1943, in Monticello, New York) is an American journalist, poet, screenwriter and producer.

== Filmography ==
Writing and Production Credits
Year	Title	Role
1985	Shaker Run	Writer
2001	L.I.E.	Writer
2007	Ahmed	Writer/Producer
2008	South of the Moon	Writer/Executive Producer
2014	The Abduction of Zack Buterfield	Writer/Producer
2019	The Next Bobby Darin	Writer
