= Paul Dano =

American actor (born 1984)

- Dano in 2025
- Born: Paul Franklin Dano; June 19, 1984 (age 42); New York City, U.S.
- Occupations: Actor; film director; writer; producer
- Years active: 1996–present
- Partner: Zoe Kazan (2007–present)
- Children: 2
- Awards: Full list

Paul Franklin Dano (/ˈdeɪnoʊ/ DAY-noh; born June 19, 1984) is an American actor and filmmaker. His work includes both independent film and blockbusters, and his accolades include nominations for a British Academy Film Award, a Golden Globe Award and two Primetime Emmy Awards.

Dano made his film acting debut in L.I.E. (2001) and gained wider recognition for playing Dwayne Hoover in Little Miss Sunshine (2006). He was nominated for the BAFTA for Best Supporting Actor for playing Paul and Eli Sunday in Paul Thomas Anderson's period drama There Will Be Blood (2007). After supporting roles in mainstream films such as Knight and Day (2010), Cowboys & Aliens (2011), and Looper (2012), Dano had critically acclaimed roles in 12 Years a Slave and Prisoners (both 2013). For his portrayal of Beach Boys founder Brian Wilson in Love & Mercy (2014), he earned a nomination for the Golden Globe for Best Supporting Actor. In 2018, he starred as a convicted murderer in the Showtime miniseries Escape at Dannemora, for which he received a nomination for a Primetime Emmy Award for Outstanding Supporting Actor. In 2022, he played The Riddler in The Batman and a fictionalized version of Arnold Spielberg in The Fabelmans, receiving a Screen Actors Guild Award nomination for the latter.

Dano made his directorial debut with the drama film Wildlife (2018), which he also co-wrote with his partner, Zoe Kazan. He has also written the comic book The Riddler: Year One (2022). On Broadway theatre, Dano has starred in productions of A Free Man of Color (2010–2011) and True West (2019).

== Early life and education ==
Dano was born on June 19, 1984, in New York City, the son of a homemaker and a financial advisor. He has a younger sister named Sarah.

Dano spent the first few years of his childhood in New York City and initially attended the Browning School. While he was a child, Dano's family moved to the Connecticut suburb of New Canaan, finally settling in Wilton. Dano continued his education at Wilton High School, graduating in 2002, and attended Eugene Lang College in New York City.

He was involved in community theater, and while he was performing in New Canaan, his parents were encouraged to take him to New York.

== Career ==
=== 1990s ===
In 1996, Dano portrayed The Little Boy (Edgar) in the world premiere of Terrence McNally's musical Ragtime at the Ford Center of the Performing Arts (now the Meridian Arts Centre) in Toronto.

=== 2000s ===
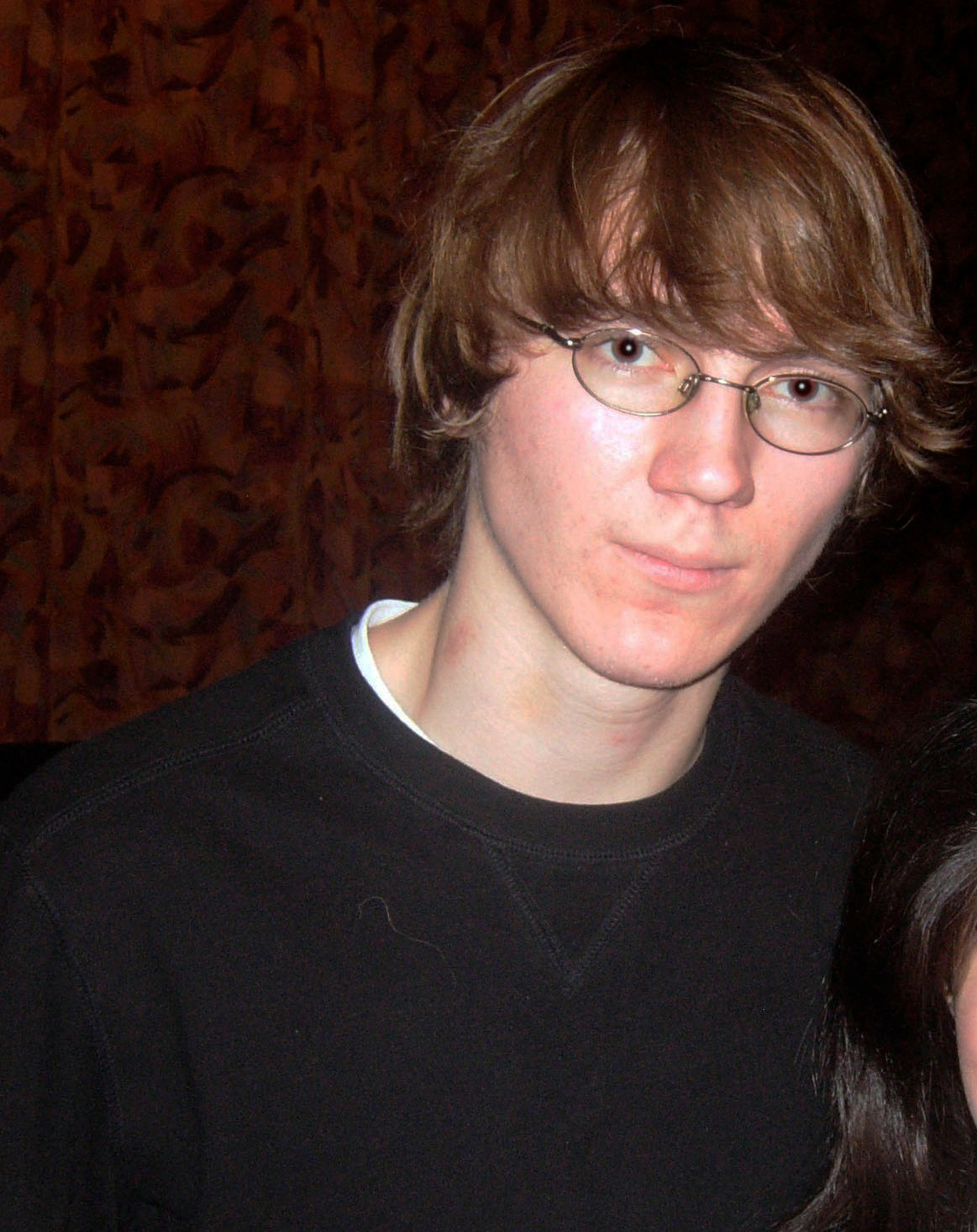
Dano in 2007

Dano made his Broadway debut at age twelve in John Tillinger's revival of Inherit the Wind, alongside George C. Scott and Charles Durning. He appeared in an episode of the sitcom Smart Guy and had a minor role in the 2000 family drama The Newcomers. He played the part of Patrick Whalen in several episodes of The Sopranos (season 4).

Dano acted in his first major film role when he was sixteen, playing Howie Blitzer, a teenage boy who becomes involved with a middle-aged ephebophile (Brian Cox) in L.I.E. (2001). He then appeared in the television film Too Young to Be a Dad as a high school student whose life is disrupted when his girlfriend becomes pregnant. He appeared in The Emperor's Club in 2002 as Martin Blythe. In 2004, he played a small role as the young Martin Asher in Taking Lives, with Angelina Jolie and Ethan Hawke. Additionally, Dano starred in The Girl Next Door, alongside Elisha Cuthbert, Emile Hirsch, and Chris Marquette. In 2005, he played supporting roles in The King and The Ballad of Jack and Rose.

He came to greater attention in 2006 when he played Dwayne, a voluntarily mute teenager, as part of an ensemble in the comedic drama Little Miss Sunshine, which received critical acclaim and collective awards for its cast. He also had a supporting role in the 2006 film Fast Food Nation, based on the nonfiction book by Eric Schlosser. Dano had a dual role in the 2007 period film There Will Be Blood, which earned him positive reviews and a BAFTA nomination for Best Supporting Actor. Texas Monthly said that his performance was "so electric that the movie sags whenever he's not around". Peter Travers remarked, "All praise to the baby-faced Dano...for bringing sly cunning and unexpected ferocity to Plainview's most formidable opponent." Rolling Stone magazine included Dano in its Hot List for 2007, calling his performance style "Daniel Day-Lewis + Billy Crudup × Johnny Depp."

Dano appeared in several additional Broadway productions, including A Thousand Clowns at the Roundabout Theatre, and in Ethan Hawke’s directorial debut, Things We Want, during its 2007 Off-Broadway run.

In 2008, he starred in Gigantic, a poorly reviewed film about a man seeking to adopt a Chinese baby, co-starring Zooey Deschanel. He reunited with Brian Cox in 2009's Good Heart, a low-budget English-language Icelandic film. He provided the voice of one of the creatures in the film adaptation of Where the Wild Things Are (2009).

=== 2010s ===
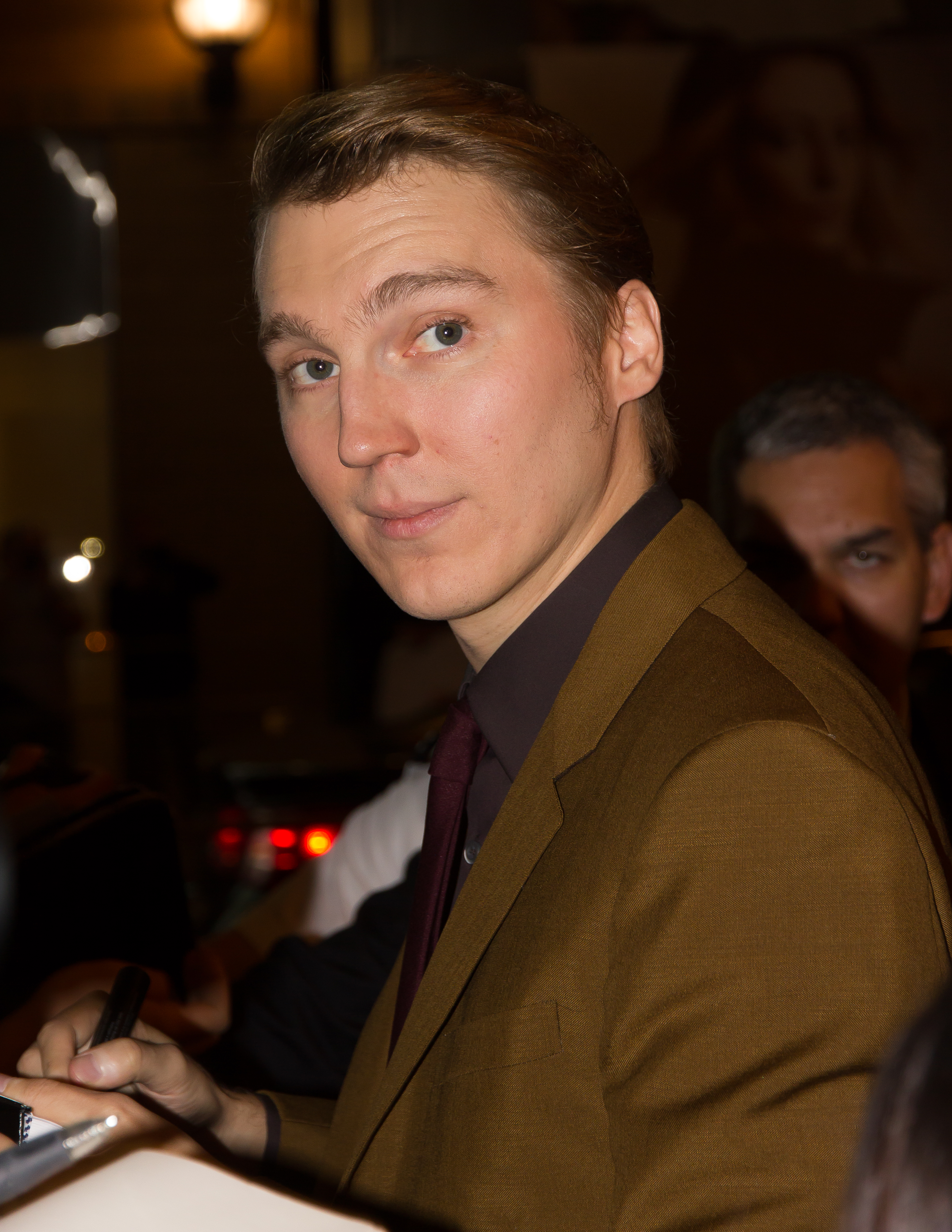
Dano at the Love & Mercy premiere at the Toronto International Film Festival 2014

He played a genius inventor in 2010's Knight and Day, an action thriller starring Tom Cruise and Cameron Diaz. The same year, he appeared in Meek's Cutoff, a well-reviewed historical drama. In 2011, he had a supporting role in the big-budget science fiction film Cowboys and Aliens.

Dano appeared in three feature films in 2012: Ruby Sparks, as a writer whose fictional character (played by Zoe Kazan, the film's writer and Dano's partner) inexplicably appears as a real person; in a supporting role alongside Joseph Gordon-Levitt and Bruce Willis in the time-travel thriller Looper; and as the writer Nick Flynn, alongside Robert De Niro, in Being Flynn, a film based on Flynn's memoir about his relationship with his father. In 2013, Dano appeared in Steve McQueen's period-drama biopic 12 Years a Slave, based on the memoirs of Solomon Northup. Dano portrayed John Tibeats, an overseer at the plantation Northup is sold to. The film was a critical success and won the Academy Award for Best Picture and numerous other award. Dano also featured in the 2013 Denis Villeneuve film Prisoners. He portrayed Alex Jones, a tormented man who was kidnapped by a nihilistic couple 26 years ago and initially framed as a suspect in a separate kidnapping.

In 2014, Dano played a younger version of the Beach Boys founder Brian Wilson (with John Cusack as an older version of Wilson) in the biopic Love & Mercy, for which he received a Golden Globe Award nomination for Best Supporting Actor.

In 2015, Dano appeared with Michael Caine and Harvey Keitel in the Italian comedy-drama Youth; Dano portrayed Jimmy Tree, an actor doing research for an upcoming role who is frustrated to be best known for a previous role as a robot. In January 2016, Dano appeared as Pierre Bezukhov in the BBC's six-part adaptation of Tolstoy's War and Peace.

In Fall 2016, he appeared in a video as an onstage "stand-in" during the Nostalgic for the Present concert tour of Australian singer Sia, for her song "Bird Set Free."

In July 2016, it was announced that Dano would make his directorial debut with the movie Wildlife, based on the 1990 novel of the same title by Richard Ford. The movie was set to be produced by June Pictures and to star Carey Mulligan and Jake Gyllenhaal. Dano stated, "I have always wanted to make films and have always known I would make films about family. I couldn't be happier to have such beautiful collaborators like Carey and Jake leading the way." The film received critical acclaim when it premiered at the Sundance Film Festival. It also screened at the Cannes Film Festival, the Toronto Film Festival and the Mill Valley Film Festival. The film has earned a 94% on Rotten Tomatoes with the consensus reading, "Wildlife's portrait of a family in crisis is beautifully composed by director Paul Dano -- and brought brilliantly to life by a career-best performance from Carey Mulligan".

In 2016, Dano played the role of Hank Thompson in Daniel Scheinert and Daniel Kwan's absurdist black-comedy film Swiss Army Man, alongside Daniel Radcliffe and Mary Elizabeth Winstead. His character is a suicidal man, stranded on an island, who befriends a farting corpse. The film premiered at the Sundance Film Festival on January 22, and opened in theaters on June 24. Although some viewers walked out of the film viewing due to its bizarre humor, critics left generally favorable reviews of the film. Dano won the Critics' Choice Award twice in 2007, and was nominated in 2014 and 2016.

In 2018, he portrayed escaped inmate David Sweat in the Showtime miniseries Escape at Dannemora alongside Patricia Arquette and Benicio del Toro, for which he received a nomination for the Primetime Emmy Award for Outstanding Supporting Actor in a Limited Series.

From December 27, 2018 to March 17, 2019, Dano starred in the critically acclaimed Broadway revival of Sam Shepard's True West, with Ethan Hawke, at the Roundabout Theater Company's American Airlines Theater in New York.

=== 2020s ===
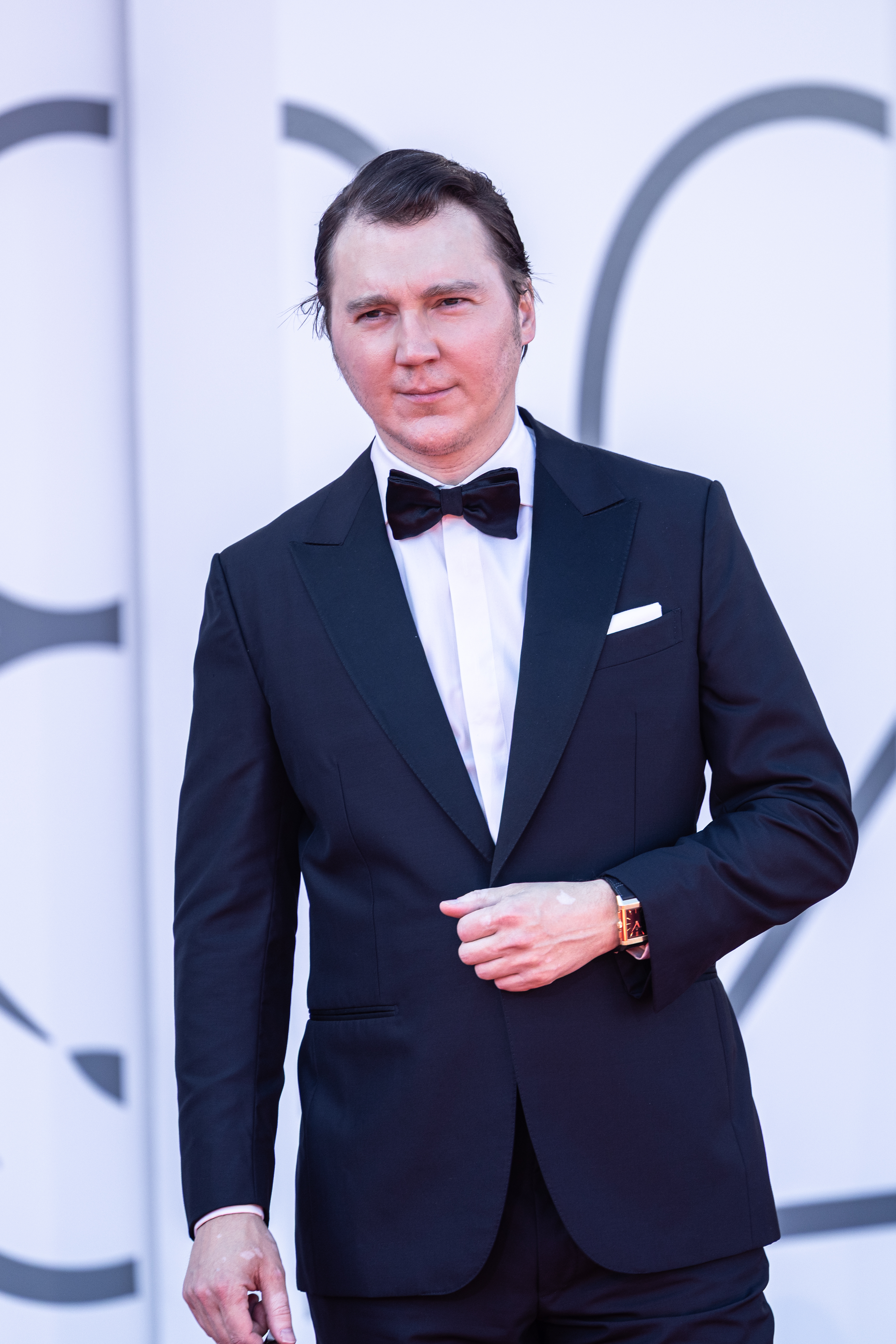
Dano at 2025 Venice Film Festival

In October 2019, Dano was cast as The Riddler in Matt Reeves's 2022 superhero film The Batman. Reeves wrote the role with Dano in mind after seeing Dano's portrayal of Brian Wilson in Love & Mercy.

In April 2021, Paul Dano was cast in Steven Spielberg's semi-autobiographical coming-of-age film The Fabelmans as Burt Fabelman, a character loosely based on Spielberg's father Arnold. The film was released in 2022 to universal acclaim; with Dano's performance earning praise from Pete Hammond of Deadline Hollywood describing him as "terrific as the genuinely nice and loving father torn between following his own career and caring for his wife and family under increasingly difficult circumstances" and Stephanie Zacharek of Time including Dano in Time's Top 10 movie performances of 2022, describing his portrayal as "the sum of all the things that so many men of that generation just didn't know how to be; we also see a deep well of love, no less real for being left unexpressed." Dano would subsequently receive nominations for Best Supporting Actor at the Screen Actors Guild Awards and Critics' Choice Movie Awards.

In 2022, Dano starred in AMC's animated drama Pantheon. In March 2022, it was announced that Dano would make his comic debut writing The Riddler: Year One for DC's Black Label imprint. The six issue limited series is set in the continuity of The Batman and showcase the rise of Edward Nashton into becoming the Riddler.

In September 2022, it was announced that Dano would star in Craig Gillespie's Dumb Money, an adaptation of Ben Mezrich's The Antisocial Network, alongside Seth Rogen, Sebastian Stan and Pete Davidson. The film was released in theaters in September 2023. The same year, Dano was a member of the Feature Film Jury at the 2023 Cannes Film Festival.

Dano joined Adam Sandler and Carey Mulligan in Netflix's Spaceman, an adaptation of Jaroslav Kalfař's novel Spaceman of Bohemia, directed by Johan Renck. The film was released in March 2024 on Netflix. The same year, Dano appeared in the television series Mr. & Mrs. Smith with Donald Glover, Maya Erskine, Michaela Coel and John Turturro. He received his second Emmy nomination for Outstanding Guest Actor in a Drama Series for his appearance in the series.

In March 2025, Dano appeared in The Studio as a guest star.

In June 2025, it was announced that Dano would write and potentially direct and produce "a high-concept comedy" for Universal Pictures, produced by The Daniels. In November 2025, it was announced that Paul Dano would star in The Chaperones, an upcoming A24 drama directed by India Donaldson.

In December 2025, Dano was reported to have joined the cast of Florian Zeller's psychological thriller Bunker.

== Personal life ==
Dano has been in a relationship with actress and screenwriter Zoe Kazan since 2007. They have a daughter, born in August 2018, and a son, born in October 2022. They reside in Boerum Hill, Brooklyn.

Dano was the vocalist and lead guitarist of the band Mook lasting from 2007-2016. Mook consisted of Dano, Gus Johnson, Dan Kreiger, and Rob Bruce. Released two albums: The Eggs in 2007 and Mook in 2011.

== Performances and works ==
=== Film ===
Key
†	Denotes productions that have not yet been released

Year	Title	Role	Notes
2000	The Newcomers	Joel	
2001	L.I.E.	Howie Blitzer	Credited as Paul Franklin Dano
2002	The Emperor's Club	Martin Blythe	
2002	Too Young to Be a Dad	Matt Freeman	
2004	Taking Lives	Young Asher	
2004	The Girl Next Door	Klitz	
2005	The Ballad of Jack and Rose	Thaddius	
2005	The King	Paul	
2006	Little Miss Sunshine	Dwayne	
2006	Fast Food Nation	Brian	
2007	Weapons	Chris	
2007	There Will Be Blood	Paul Sunday / Eli Sunday	
2008	Explicit Ills	Rocco	
2008	Light and the Sufferer	Don ("Light")	
2008	Gigantic	Brian Weathersby	Also executive producer
2009	Taking Woodstock	VW Guy	
2009	The Good Heart	Lucas	
2009	Where the Wild Things Are	Alexander (voice)	
2010	The Extra Man	Louis Ives	
2010	Meek's Cutoff	Thomas Gately	
2010	Knight and Day	Simon Feck	
2011	Cowboys & Aliens	Percy Dolarhyde	
2012	Being Flynn	Nick Flynn	
2012	Ruby Sparks	Calvin Weir-Fields	Also executive producer
2012	Looper	Seth	
2012	For Ellen	Joby	Also executive producer
2013	12 Years a Slave	John Tibeats	
2013	Prisoners	Alex Jones	
2014	Love & Mercy	Brian Wilson	
2015	Youth	Jimmy Tree	
2016	Swiss Army Man	Hank	
2017	Okja	Jay	
2018	Wildlife	—N/a	Director, writer, and producer
2021	The Guilty	Matthew Fontenot (voice)	
2022	The Batman	Edward Nashton / The Riddler	
2022	The Fabelmans	Burt Fabelman	
2023	Dumb Money	Keith Gill	
2024	Spaceman	Hanuš	Voice
2025	The Wizard of the Kremlin	Vadim Baranov	
2026	Bunker	Andrew	
2027	Possession †		Filming
2027	The Chaperones †		Post-production
2027	Vegas: A Love Story †	Ryder	Post-production

=== Television ===
Year	Title	Role	Notes
1997	Smart Guy	Nicholas	Episode: "She Got Game"
2002–2004	The Sopranos	Patrick Whalen	2 episodes
2016	War & Peace	Pierre Bezukhov	Miniseries, 6 episodes
2018	Escape at Dannemora	David Sweat	Miniseries, 7 episodes
2022	Saturday Night Live	Himself	Episode: "Zoë Kravitz/Rosalía"
2022–2023	Pantheon	Caspian Keyes	Voice role, 16 episodes
2024	Mr. & Mrs. Smith	Hot Neighbor / Harris Materbach	3 episodes
2024	Fantasmas	Jeff	Episode: "Cookies and Spaghetti"
2025	The Studio	Himself	Episode: "The Promotion"

=== Theater ===
Year	Title	Role	Notes
1995	A Month in the Country	understudy (Kolia)	Criterion Center Stage Right
1995–1998	A Christmas Carol	Scrooge at 12/Street Urchin	The Theater at Madison Square Garden
1996	Inherit the Wind	Howard	Royale Theatre
1996	Ragtime	The Little Boy	World premiere, Toronto
2007	Things We Want	Charles	Acorn Theatre
2010–2011	A Free Man of Color	Meriwether Lewis	Vivian Beaumont Theater
2019	True West	Austin	American Airlines Theater

=== Music videos ===
Paul Dano's music video credits
Year	Title	Artist(s)	Director(s)	Notes	Ref(s)
2026	"Here"	Mumford & Sons with Chris Stapleton	Bradley J. Calder		

=== Discography ===
With Mook

- The Eggs EP (2007)
- Mook (2011)

=== Bibliography ===
- The Riddler: Year One (2022–2023)
