= Acts of Worship (film) =

2001 film by Rosemary Rodriguez

Acts of Worship is a 2001 film starring Ana Reeder, Michael Hyatt, Christopher Kadish and Nestor Rodriguez. The film is the first feature from writer and director Rosemary Rodriguez and was screened at the 2001 Sundance Film Festival.

== Plot ==
Alix (Ana Reeder) is a woman living in New York City who is fighting a losing battle with heroin and cocaine addiction. Her boyfriend Mark (Christopher Kadish) has grown tired of her dependence problems and forces her to move out of his apartment. With nowhere to go, Alix must fend for herself on the streets, and she supports her habit by stealing. Mark eventually takes pity on Alix and allows her to come back, but she soon overdoses on heroin, and a nervous Mark drags her comatose body out of his apartment and into the apartment complexes hallway. Digna (Michael Hyatt), a photographer who has had her own problems with addiction, finds Alix and takes her in over the objections of her boyfriend, Anthony (Nestor Rodriguez). Digna tries to help Alix clean up, but Alix is unable to stay on the wagon, and when she falls back into the cycle of addiction, Digna soon follows her.
