= Hilary Howard =

American actress, writer, editor, and screenwriter

- Occupations: Film actress, screenwriter, journalist
- Spouse: Jy Murphy

Hilary Ren Howard is an American actress, writer, editor, and screenwriter, best known for her work in the film Kaaterskill Falls (2001).

== Biography ==
Howard obtained her B.A. in English from the University of North Carolina at Chapel Hill.

Howard has also written articles for the Travel and Arts and Leisure sections of The New York Times.

After working several years for the Times as a researcher as a researcher and fact checker, Howard joined Room for Debate in 2012.

She is also a freelance writer and performer.

Howard is married to the actor Jy Murphy. They live with their two daughters in New York City. Throughout her life, Howard has hitchhiked through Tierra Del Fuego, participated in shoe modeling, was a waitress, and produced a Shakespeare Festival on Long Island.
