= Kaaterskill Falls (film) =

2001 film by Josh Apter and Peter Olsen

- VHS cover
- Directed by: Josh Apter; Peter Olsen
- Written by: Josh Apter; Peter Olsen; Hilary Howard; Anthony Leslie; Mitchell Riggs
- Produced by: Josh Apter; Peter Olsen
- Starring: Hilary Howard; Benjamin Garden; Anthony Leslie; Mitchell Riggs
- Cinematography: Peter Olsen
- Edited by: Josh Apter
- Release date: 2001
- Running time: 86 minutes
- Country: United States
- Language: English

Kaaterskill Falls is an independent American film made in 2000 and released in 2001 directed by Josh Apter and Peter Olsen. It uses plot elements from Roman Polanski's Knife in the Water set, and filmed in, the Catskill Mountains. It is unrelated to Allegra Goodman's 1998 novel of the same title.

== Reception ==
The film has a 75% rating on Rotten Tomatoes based on 8 reviews. Metacritic, which uses a weighted average, assigned the film a score of 51 out of 100, based on 7 critics, indicating "mixed or average" reviews.

The New York Times said it is "not a film that stands up to analytical demands for logic and utter consistency of character. But it establishes its ominous mood and tension swiftly."
