= Shayne Lewis =

- Guiding Light character
- Jeff Branson as Shayne Lewis
- Portrayed by: Travis Cartier (1990–1991); Brett Cooper (1993–1997); Garrett Stevens (1997–1999); Tony Michael Donnelly (1999); Billy Kay (2000–2003); Marty West (2003–2004); Jeff Branson (2008–2009)
- Duration: 1990–1991; 1993–2004; 2008–2009
- First appearance: February 19, 1990
- Last appearance: September 18, 2009
- Created by: Pamela K. Long
- Introduced by: Robert Calhoun (1990); Jill Farren Phelps (1993); Ellen Wheeler (2008)
In-universe information
- Other names: Joshua Shayne Lewis
- Parents: Joshua Lewis; Reva Shayne
- Siblings: Dylan Lewis; Marah Lewis; Jonathan Randall
- Spouse: Dinah Marler (2009)
- Children: Henry Cooper Lewis

Shayne Lewis is a fictional character from the CBS soap opera Guiding Light. He is the second child of supercouple Joshua Lewis and Reva Shayne. In 2008, Jeff Branson stepped into the role to critical acclaim and soon won a Daytime Emmy Award for Outstanding Supporting Actor in 2009, having the distinction of winning the final award in the show's last year on television. Branson previously appeared on the show in 2004 as a young version of Alan Spaulding in a flashback scene during Carrie Carruther's murder investigation.

== Casting ==
Prior to Branson assuming the role as an adult, the role was portrayed by a string of child actors. These included Travis Cartier from 1990 to 1991, Bret Cooper from 1993 to 1997, Garrett Stevens from 1997 to 1999, Tony Michael Donnelly in 1999, Billy Kay from 2000 to 2003 and Marty West from 2003 to 2004.

== Storylines ==
Born February 19, Joshua "Shayne" Lewis spent his early childhood without his mother Reva Shayne and was raised by his father Joshua Lewis. Soon after his birth in 1990, Reva suffered a severe case of postpartum depression and drove her car off a bridge and was presumed dead. Shayne was abandoned by his mother Reva soon after he was born. Josh was left to raise him, with the help of babysitter Harley Cooper. Josh briefly left for Italy to search for Reva and then brought Shayne and his sister Marah to Europe with him. The family returned to Springfield in 1993. As Josh raised the children alone, he soon fell in love with Annie Dutton. Both children grew very close to her, so much so that, when Reva finally did return, it was obvious that Annie had been more of a mother to them than she ever had. She gave custody to Josh and Annie, but the children gradually developed a bond with their mother, though it took years. Reva re-entered Shayne's life in 1995. Later, Josh's split with Annie alienated them, but they forgave Josh when he ended up remarrying Reva.

The reunion didn't last long. In addition to the quick collapse of Josh and Reva, Shayne also learned of his other abandoned sibling in San Cristobal and had to endure being kidnapped by Holly Reade. Further friction arose when Josh began dating Olivia, but the children gradually let her into their lives. His relationship with his sister began to be strained, however. Her interest in producing bootleg CDs, with the help of Daisy and Tony Santos, created a fair bit of acrimony. He also became involved with Catalina Quesada, a woman his sister could not stand. The CDs that the little group produced were discovered and they were all charged.

Stranger things were in store for him. His mother was acting peculiar and he soon discovered that she had been traveling back in time. Later that year, he became attracted to Marina Cooper. To get in her good books, he covered for her several times while she was shoplifting and tipping off mobsters about her father's investigations. Their friendship was burdened by her habit of dating criminals and psychopaths. He worried about her relationship with Ben Reade to the point that he nearly lost his baseball scholarship. Eventually, he and Marina went away for the weekend together, though she was abducted by Ben before it could get too intimate. Shayne attempted to rescue her but Ben attacked him and ran, later killing himself. Following his ordeal, Shayne served as Marina's source of comfort and their relationship blossomed. After a concert, they were in a car accident which nearly killed him. The other car was driven by Josh, who was on his way to pick him up for a meeting with a baseball scout. Although he encouraged Marina to turn away from him, she stayed and helped him through his recovery. The process was lengthy and he frequently felt guilty for making Marina miss other opportunities. While Marina continued to get mixed up with semi-illegal activities, he began to look at other things to do with his life. Baseball no longer appealed to him and he decided to go into charity working, starting a Peace Corps operation in Bosnia. For the past several years, he has been working in dangerous, war torn areas around the world.

Shayne made his way back to town in order to resume his relationships with his family but struggles to deal with the injury he suffered in Bosnia that left him partially paralyzed until getting surgery that corrected his paralysis. He soon learns Marina is getting married and begins to doubt his family and the love they have for him. After abusing alcohol and finding pity on his life, he meets Dinah Marler. They struggle because Shayne still has feelings for Marina, who is married to Dinah's ex-husband A.C. Mallet. It was revealed in early 2009 that Shayne and his girlfriend Lara were expecting a baby, who is revealed to be Henry, the adopted son of Marina and Mallet. After annulling his marriage to Dinah, who fled town to avoid being charged with the murder of a man she thought was Edmund Winslow, Shayne wanted to become a real father to his son. Since then Mallet left town, because he didn't want his son to have two fathers, and left Marina to raise their son Henry with Shayne.
