= Billy Kay (actor) =

American actor and musician

- Born: Long Island, New York, U.S.
- Occupations: Actor; singer
- Years active: 1990–present

Billy Kay is an American actor and musician. He is best known for his portrayal of Shayne Lewis on the CBS soap opera Guiding Light.

Born on Long Island, New York, Kay began his acting career at a young age. At the age of eleven, he made his on-stage debut as Artful Dodger in the musical Oliver!, and went on to appear in various other theatrical plays including The Who's Tommy, The Sound of Music, and The Wiz. After appearing in several small film parts, Kay landed the role of Shayne Lewis on the CBS soap opera Guiding Light, which earned him a nomination for a YoungStar Award for Best Young Actor in a Daytime TV Series. He was also nominated for an Independent Spirit Award for Best Supporting Male for his performance in the independent drama L.I.E. (2001). Kay's other acting credits include films Halloween: Resurrection (2002), The Battle of Shaker Heights (2003), Debating Robert Lee (2004), and television series such as Touched by an Angel, CSI: Miami, and Charmed.

== Filmography ==
- The Magic of Marciano (2000)
- Time Share (2000)
- The Newcomers (2000)
- L.I.E. (2001)
- Halloween: Resurrection (2002)
- The Gray in Between (2002)
- The Battle of Shaker Heights (2003)
- The Black Facade (2009)
- Choose (2010)
- Yelling to the Sky (2011)
- Losers Take All (2011)

== Awards and nominations ==
Year	Award	Category	Work	Result
2000	YoungStar Award	Best Young Actor in a Daytime TV Series	Guiding Light	Nominated
2001	Young Artist Award	Best Performance in a Daytime TV Series	Guiding Light	Nominated
2002	Chlotrudis Award	Best Supporting Actor	L.I.E.	Nominated
2002	Film Independent Spirit Award	Best Supporting Male	L.I.E.	Nominated
2006	Method Fest Award	Best Ensemble Cast	Debating Robert Lee	Won
