= L.I.E. (film) =

2001 film by Michael Cuesta

- Theatrical release poster
- Directed by: Michael Cuesta
- Written by: Stephen M. Ryder; Michael Cuesta; Gerald Cuesta
- Produced by: Michael Cuesta; Linda Moran; René Bastian
- Starring: Brian Cox; Paul Dano (Note: Credited under his full name "Paul Franklin Dano".); Billy Kay; Bruce Altman; James Costa; Tony Donnelly
- Cinematography: Romeo Tirone
- Edited by: Eric Carlson; Kane Platt
- Music by: Pierre Földes
- Production companies: Alter Ego Entertainment; Belladonna Productions
- Distributed by: New Yorker Films; Lot 47 Films
- Release date: September 7, 2001
- Running time: 97 minutes
- Country: United States
- Language: English
- Budget: $700,000
- Box office: $1.7 million

L.I.E. is a 2001 American drama film about a relationship between Howie, a troubled 15-year-old boy, and a middle aged man known as "Big John". The title is an initialism for the Long Island Expressway. The film was directed by Michael Cuesta, who has said that the film is about exploring sexuality. It stars Paul Dano in his first lead role as the boy Howie, and Brian Cox as John.

== Plot ==
Howie Blitzer is deeply affected by the death of his mother in a car accident on the Long Island Expressway. His situation is exacerbated by his acrimonious relationship with his distant father Marty, who brought a trophy girlfriend into the house less than a month after his wife's death. Howie's only solace is the company of his best friend Gary, a juvenile delinquent and hustler. Although Gary is attracted to Howie, Howie is unsure of his own sexuality. They have two other friends their age, one of whom has an incestuous relationship with his sister. The four boys routinely break into neighborhood houses.

One night, they break into the house of "Big John" Harrigan during his birthday party. Gary knows his way around the house; it is later revealed that Big John is one of his steady clients. Big John interrupts them, and they narrowly escape with a pair of rare and valuable Russian pistols. John later confronts Gary over the burglary and Gary names Howie as his accomplice.

Pretending to be a friend of Howie's mother, John introduces himself and invites Howie back to his house. Once there, he confronts Howie about the burglary, demanding the return of the guns. Howie can retrieve only one of them from Gary's room, so John demands $1000 for the other; Howie can only offer to work off the debt. Putting on a pornographic video, John hints that Howie can repay him with sex. Howie hastily leaves, but after returning home, masturbates to a fantasy involving John and the girl in the video.

Gary steals money from Howie's father and disappears to Los Angeles, leaving Howie alone. John and Howie begin a tenuous friendship in which John becomes a kind of father figure to him. There is no sexual activity, but there is talk of sex. Howie realizes that he wields a degree of sexual power over John, something John is aware of. Howie stays over at John's house, temporarily displacing John's 19-year-old lover Scott, who warns Howie not to take John from him. Howie discovers a stash of child pornography in the house, including photos of an 11-year-old Gary.

Howie's father happens to see him skipping school, and, losing his temper, he hits the boy. Later that day, he is arrested for dangerous practices in his construction business, and when Howie returns home to find him missing, he believes his father has abandoned him. He goes to John, approaching him in his bedroom wearing just his underpants, expecting they will have sex. But John explains to Howie what happened with his father, and the boy breaks down and cries. John leaves Howie to sleep by himself.

The next morning, John is all charm, fixing Howie breakfast and taking him to see his father in jail. Howie's father apologizes for hitting him and promises to spend more time with him once he is out of prison. Howie is unconvinced, and merely tells his father never to hit him again.

After dropping Howie off, John returns to the local rest area where young hustlers connect with John and sit in his car. Scott, devastated by John's abandonment, drives by and shoots him dead.

In the final scene, Howie contemplates the expressway, vowing he will not let it get him.

== Cast ==
- Brian Cox as Big John Harrigan
- Paul Dano as Howie Blitzer
- Billy Kay as Gary Terrio
- Bruce Altman as Marty Blitzer
- Walter Masterson as Scott
- James Costa as Kevin Cole
- Adam LeFevre as Elliot
- Tony Donnelly as Brian
- B. Constance Barry as Anne Harrigan
- Gladys Dano as Sylvia Blitzer

== Production ==
Portions of the film were filmed at Harborfields High School, located in Greenlawn, New York, not far from the Long Island Expressway. A scene was filmed at the Dix Hills Diner on Jericho Turnpike in Elwood, New York, and another at Callahan Beach Park in Fort Salonga, New York.

Because Paul Dano was underage at the time of production, his mother, Gladys, was present on set and additionally plays the non-speaking role of Howie's deceased mother, Sylvia, in several flashback and dream sequences.

== Themes ==
Sexual identity is a major theme in the film; director Michael Cuesta has said that the ambiguity of Howie's sexual orientation and his relationship with Big John and Gary is at the heart of the film.

Brian Cox has said, "Big John realizes that Howie is much more than a little boy, a young boy he can hit on". Cuesta has said that John is confused, and doesn't know if he wanted "to be with him, sexually, or just father him".

== Release ==
L.I.E. premiered at the 2001 Sundance Film Festival. It went on to show at several other film festivals including the Edinburgh International Film Festival, the Bergen International Film Festival, the Stockholm International Film Festival, Outfest, the Deauville Film Festival, the Long Island International Film Expo and the Helsinki International Film Festival. The film opened to cinemas in New York on September 7, 2001.

The film received an NC-17 rating from the MPAA. After the filmmakers unsuccessfully appealed for an R rating, the film was later distributed without a rating; however, many theater chains choose not to exhibit unrated films. Both an edited version which received an R rating ("for strong sexual content involving teens, language, and brief violence") and the original unrated/uncut film are available on DVD.

=== Critical reception ===
The film has an approval rating of 85% on Rotten Tomatoes based on 85 reviews, with an average rating of 6.96/10. The critical consensus states: "L.I.E. is a well-acted and unsettling look at a boy's relationship with a pedophile."

=== Accolades ===
Awards

- Independent Spirit Award
  - Best Debut Performance – Paul Dano
  - Producers Award – René Bastian, Linda Moran, and Michael Cuesta
- Satellite Awards
  - Best Actor – Motion Picture Drama (Brian Cox)

Nominations

- Independent Spirit Award
  - Best Lead Actor – Brian Cox
  - Best Supporting Male – Billy Kay
  - Best First Screenplay – Stephen M. Ryder, Michael Cuesta, and Gerald Cuesta
  - Best Director – Michael Cuesta
  - Best Feature – Rene Bastin, Linda Moran, and Michael Cuesta
- AFI Awards
  - AFI Featured Actor of the Year – Male – Movies Brian Cox
