= Alexandre Moratto =

Brazilian-American filmmaker

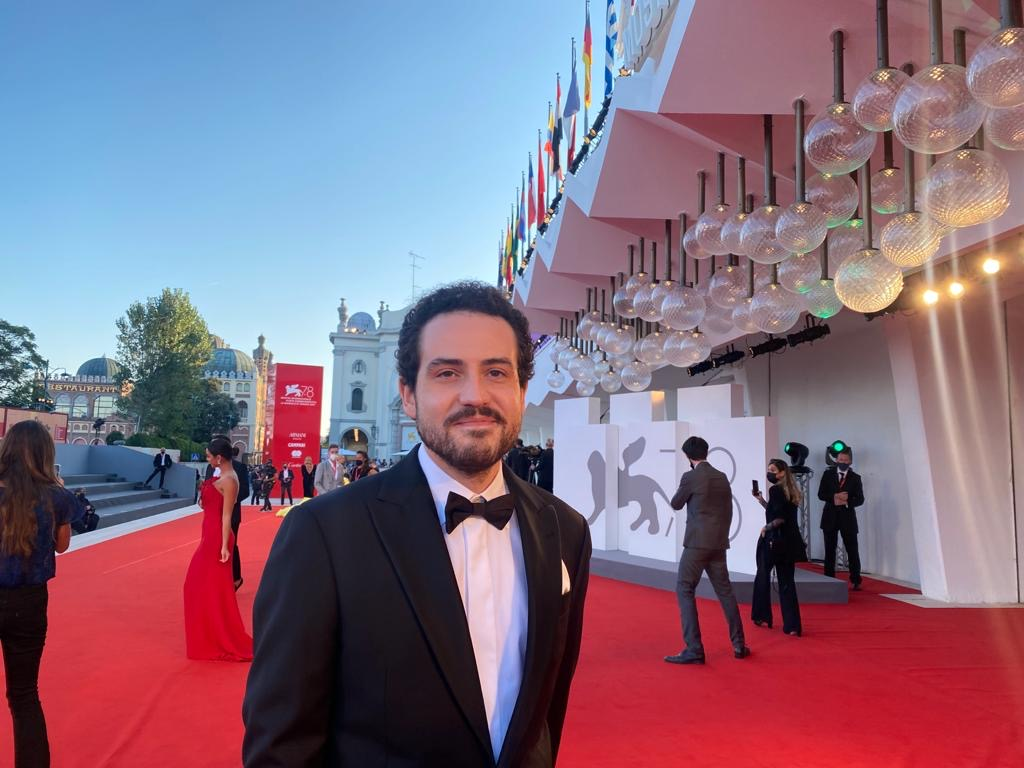
- Alexandre Moratto at the 2021 Venice Film Festival premiere of 7 Prisoners
- Born: December 12, 1988 (age 37)
- Citizenship: Brazilian-American
- Occupation: Filmmaker
- Years active: 2010-present

Alexandre Moratto is a Brazilian-American filmmaker. His work was recognized in 2018 when he released the feature film Sócrates, which was showcased at several festivals and was nominated for three categories at the 2019 Independent Spirit Awards, with Moratto winning the "Someone to Watch" award, given to emerging directors who stood out. In 2021, critics commented that he cemented his reputation as a promising young director with his second feature film, 7 Prisoners, which premiered at the Venice Film Festival to critical acclaim and was released by Netflix the same year.

== Career ==
Moratto began his career as an assistant to Iranian-American director Ramin Bahrani, who was nominated for an Academy Award for the Netflix film The White Tiger. Moratto was only 17 years old and lied on his resume to get the job. According to interviews, Bahrani was impressed by his dedication, became his mentor, and later produced Moratto's first feature film, Sócrates.

Produced in partnership with Instituto Querô, a non-profit recognized by UNICEF, Sócrates was made with a budget of only 20 thousand dollars, featuring a cast and crew composed of teenagers from public schools and low-income communities in Santos, São Paulo. The film received international recognition, was distributed in theaters in the U.S., England, and Brazil (by O2 Filmes), screened at several national and international film festivals, and won numerous awards, including the "Someone to Watch" award at the Independent Spirit Awards (given to Moratto), as well as nominations for the John Cassavetes Award and Best Actor at the same event. Moratto cast the young Brazilian actor Christian Malheiros for his first acting role. For his performance, Malheiros was nominated for what some critics refer to as the "Independent Oscar," competing alongside Joaquin Phoenix and Ethan Hawke, and went on to star in the hit show Sintonia as well as Moratto's second feature film, 7 Prisoners.

With 7 Prisoners, Moratto worked again with Bahrani and Fernando Meirelles, the director of City of God, in the production. He also worked again with Thayná Mantesso, a young graduate from Querô, as a co-writer. Meirelles, who met Moratto through the distribution of Sócrates by O2 Filmes, discussed an affinity for the project and the filmmaker's vision in interviews. Moratto cast Rodrigo Santoro to play Luca, a foreman at a junkyard in São Paulo involved in human trafficking. Santoro stated that portraying Luca was a painful experience and reflected on the importance of cinema in promoting a dialogue about social issues. Upon its release, Netflix revealed that 7 Prisoners was one of the most-watched films on the platform, being the second most-watched non-English language film in the world during its initial release. Regarding the project, Moratto discussed his research process, which included meeting with survivors of human trafficking in Brazil, with the goal of portraying their struggles with respect.

In 2021, after the film's release, it was announced that Moratto received the Guggenheim Fellowship in the United States, a financial award granted to those "individuals who demonstrate exceptional capacity for productive scholarship or exceptional creative ability in the arts." It was also announced that he would be represented by the Hollywood agency William Morris Endeavor. Critics have cited this recognition as highlighting Moratto as an emerging director, known for exploring complex social themes in an artistic and accessible way for the public.

== Filmography ==
=== Films ===
Year	Title	Director
2018	Sócrates	check
2021	7 Prisoners	check

== Awards and nominations ==
Year	Award	Category	Filme	Result	Ref.
2018	Mix Brasil	Best Film	Sócrates	Won	
2018	Mix Brasil	Best Director	Sócrates	Won	
2019	Independent Spirit Awards	"Someone To Watch" Award	Sócrates	Won	
2019	Independent Spirit Awards	John Cassavetes Award	Sócrates	Nominated	
2021	Venice Film Festival	Best Film	7 Prisoners	Nominated	
2021	Venice Film Festival	Best Film in a Foreign Language	7 Prisoners	Won	

== Personal life ==
Moratto is openly gay.
