= 34th Independent Spirit Awards =

US film awards ceremony in 2019

- Awarded for: Best in independent film
- Date: February 23, 2019
- Site: Santa Monica Pier; Santa Monica, California, U.S.
- Hosted by: Aubrey Plaza

Highlights
- Best Feature: If Beale Street Could Talk
- Most awards: If Beale Street Could Talk (3)
- Most nominations: Eighth Grade, First Reformed, We the Animals and You Were Never Really Here (4)

Television coverage
- Channel: IFC

The 34th Film Independent Spirit Awards, honoring the best independent films of 2018, were presented by Film Independent on February 23, 2019. The nominations were announced on November 16, 2018 by actresses Molly Shannon and Gemma Chan. The ceremony was televised in the United States by IFC, taking place inside its usual tent setting on a beach in Santa Monica, California. It was hosted by Aubrey Plaza.

== Winners and nominees ==
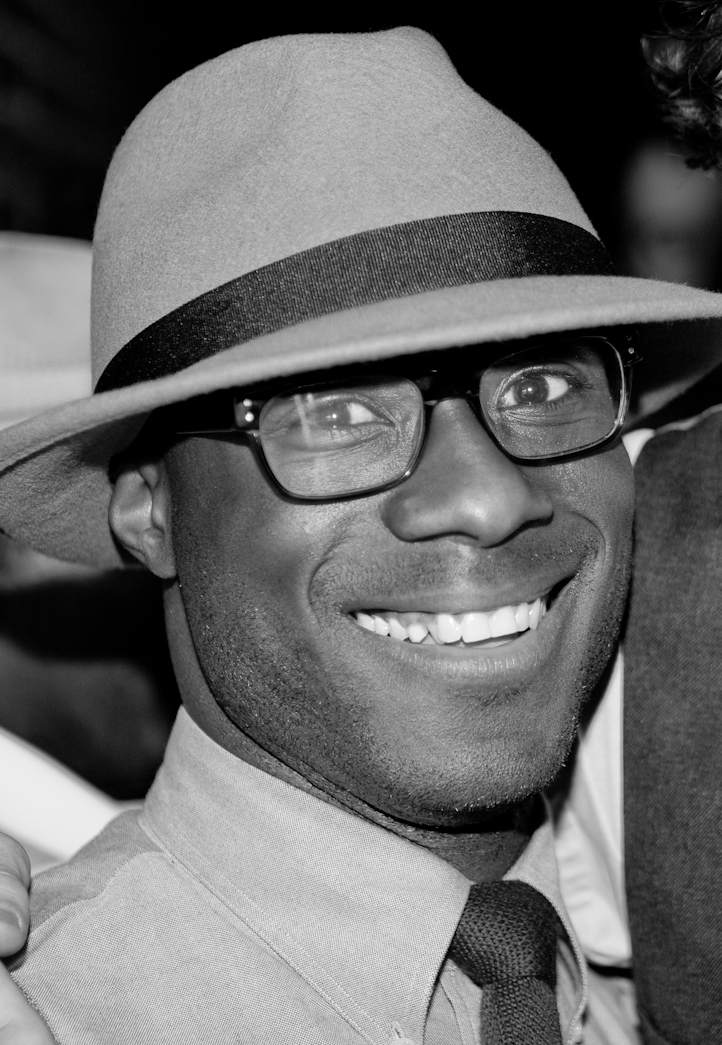
Barry Jenkins, Best Director winner

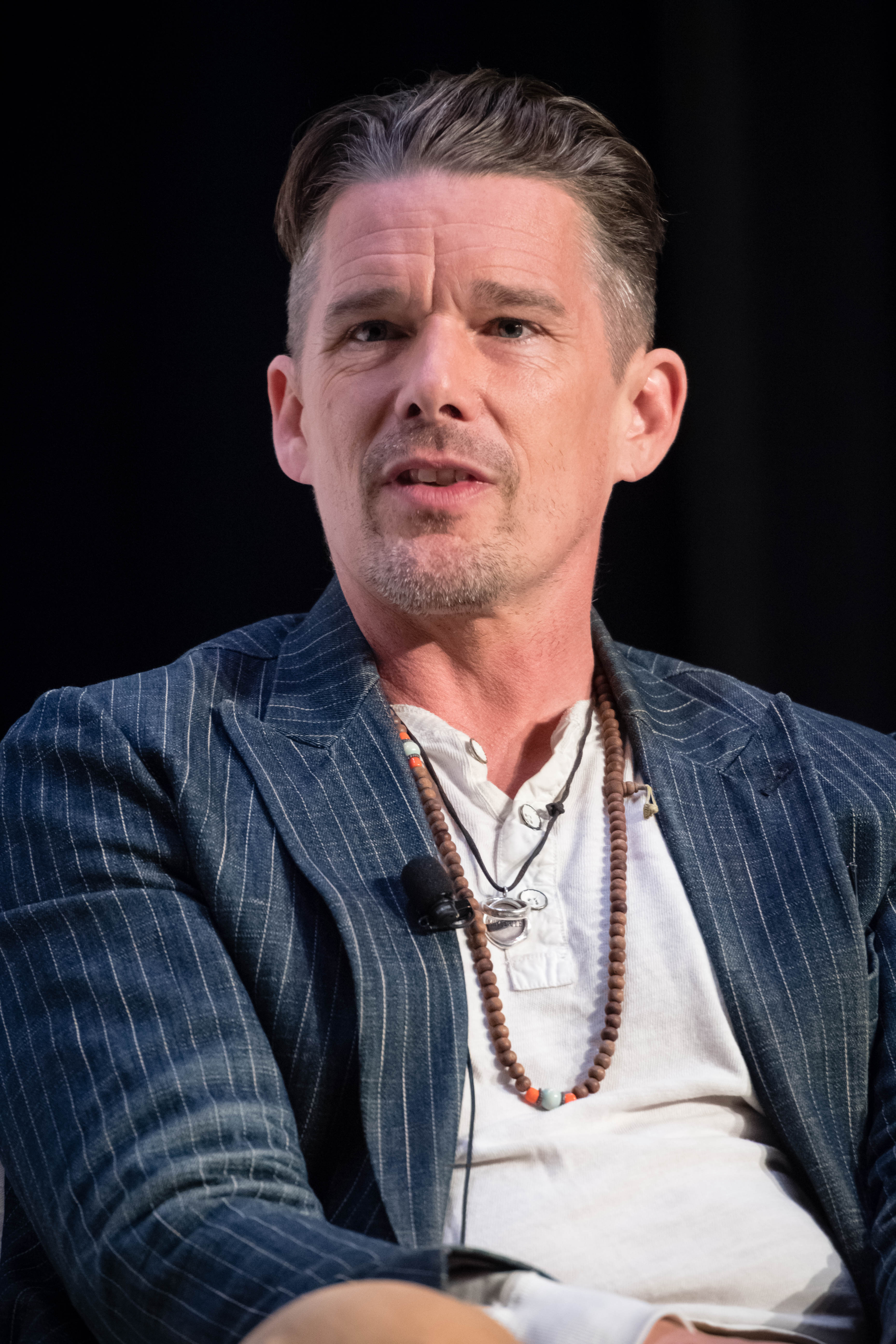
Ethan Hawke, Best Male Lead winner

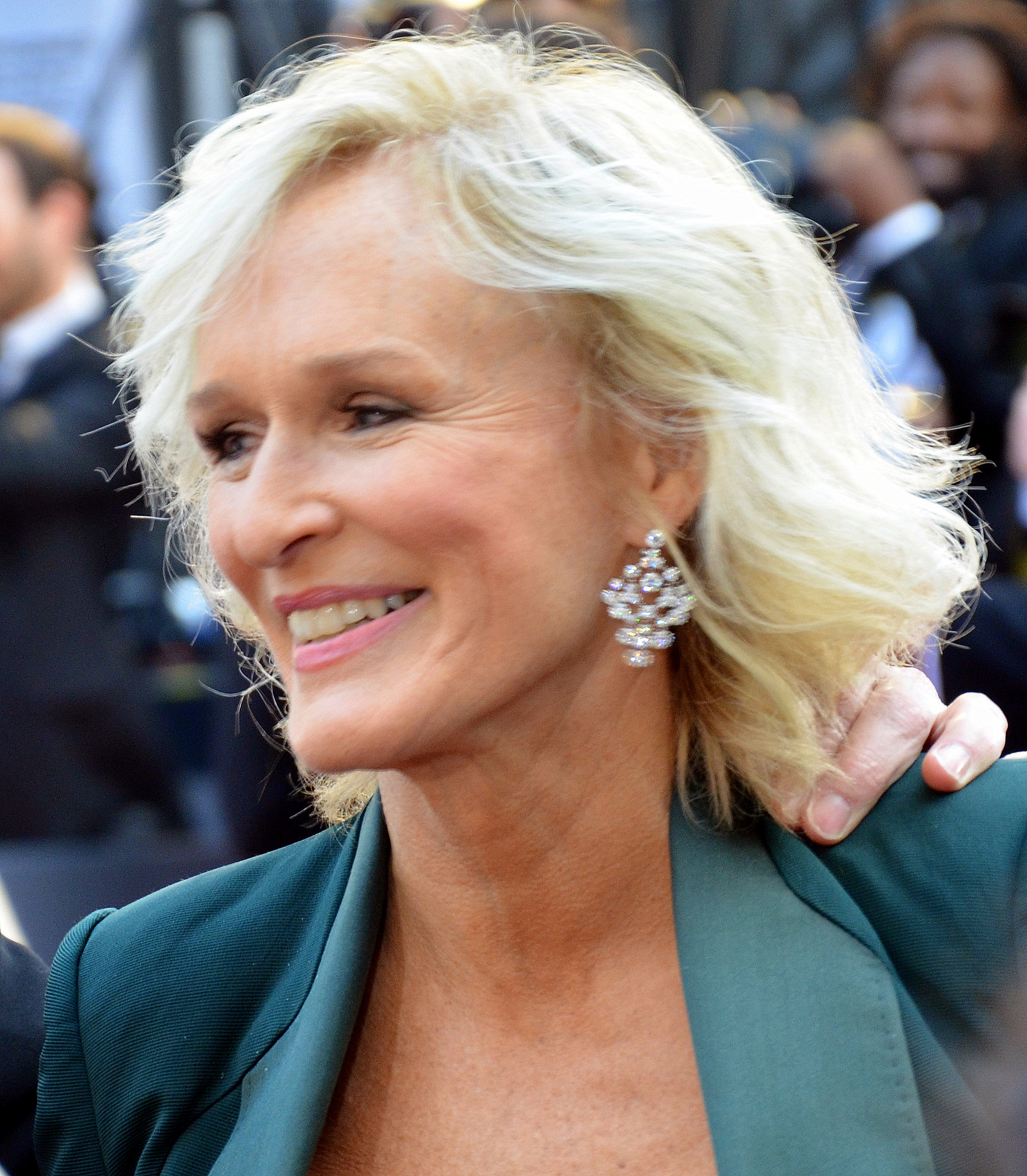
Glenn Close, Best Female Lead winner

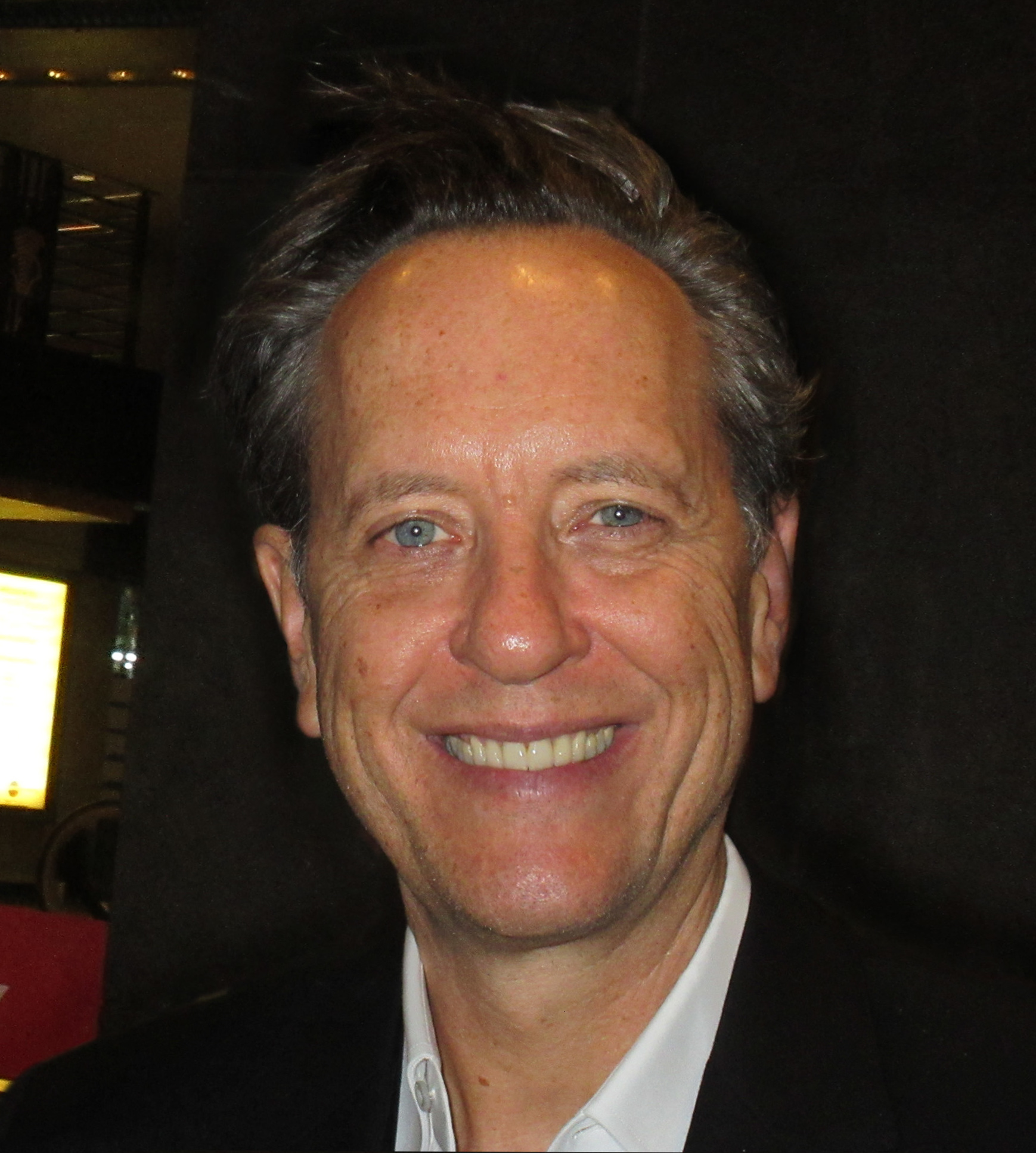
Richard E. Grant, Best Supporting Male winner

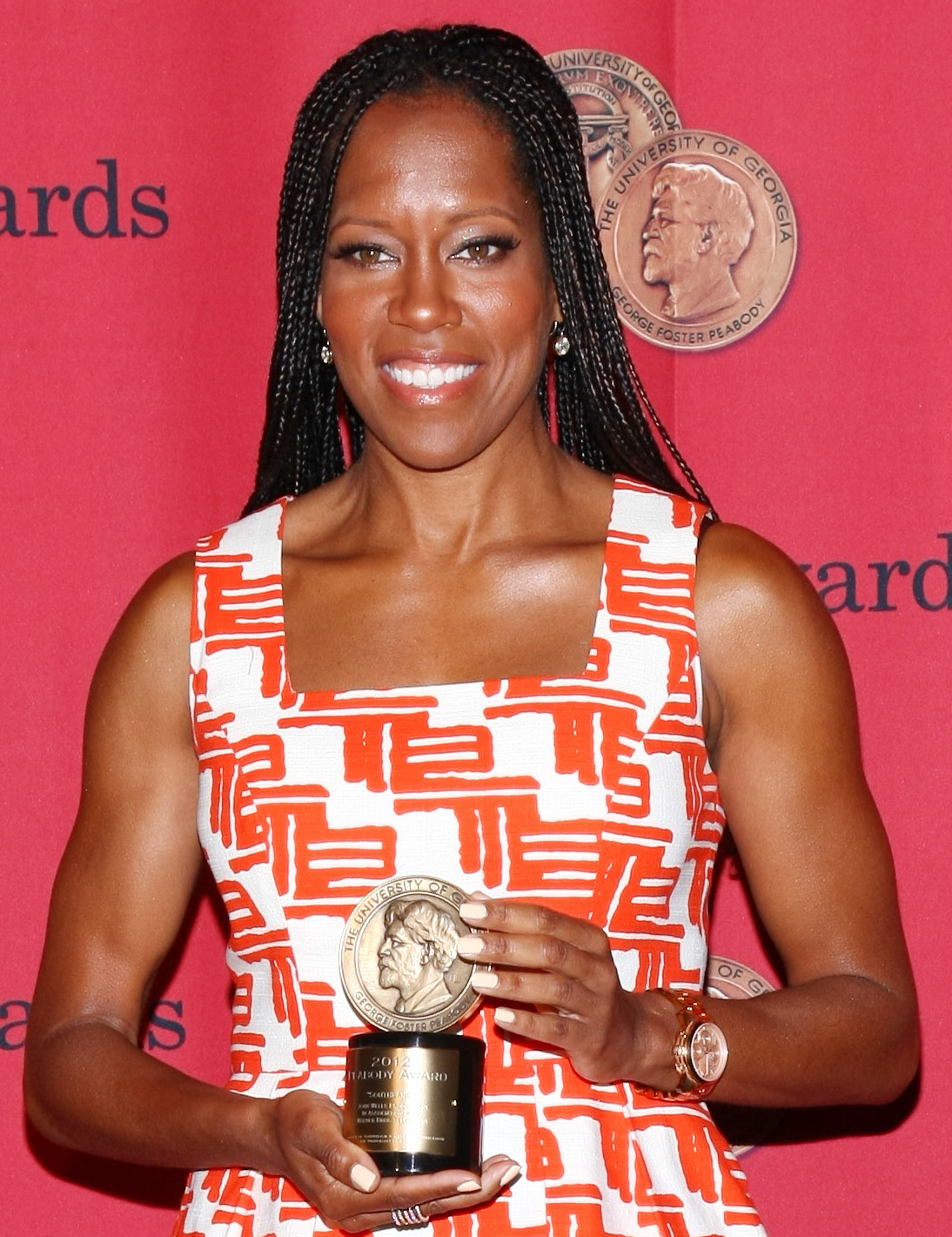
Regina King, Best Supporting Female winner

Best Feature	Best Director
If Beale Street Could Talk: Eighth Grade; First Reformed; Leave No Trace; You Were Never Really Here	Barry Jenkins – If Beale Street Could Talk: Debra Granik – Leave No Trace; Tamara Jenkins – Private Life; Lynne Ramsay – You Were Never Really Here; Paul Schrader – First Reformed
Best Male Lead	Best Female Lead
Ethan Hawke – First Reformed as Pastor Ernst Toller: John Cho – Searching as David Kim; Daveed Diggs – Blindspotting as Collin Hoskins; Christian Malheiros – Sócrates as Sócrates; Joaquin Phoenix – You Were Never Really Here as Joe	Glenn Close – The Wife as Joan Castleman: Toni Collette – Hereditary as Annie Graham; Elsie Fisher – Eighth Grade as Kayla Day; Regina Hall – Support the Girls as Lisa Conroy; Helena Howard – Madeline's Madeline as Madeline; Carey Mulligan – Wildlife as Jeanette Brinson
Best Supporting Male	Best Supporting Female
Richard E. Grant – Can You Ever Forgive Me? as Jack Hock: Raúl Castillo – We the Animals as Paps; Adam Driver – BlacKkKlansman as Detective Philip "Flip" Zimmerman; Josh Hamilton – Eighth Grade as Mark Day; John David Washington – Monsters and Men as Dennis Williams	Regina King – If Beale Street Could Talk as Sharon Rivers: Kayli Carter – Private Life as Sadie Barrett; Tyne Daly – A Bread Factory as Dorothea; Thomasin McKenzie – Leave No Trace as Tom; J. Smith-Cameron – Nancy as Ellen Lynch
Best Screenplay	Best First Screenplay
Nicole Holofcener and Jeff Whitty – Can You Ever Forgive Me?: Richard Glatzer, Rebecca Lenkiewicz, and Wash Westmoreland – Colette; Tamara Jenkins – Private Life; Boots Riley – Sorry to Bother You; Paul Schrader – First Reformed	Bo Burnham – Eighth Grade: Christina Choe – Nancy; Cory Finley – Thoroughbreds; Jennifer Fox – The Tale; Laurie Shephard and Quinn Shephard – Blame
Best First Feature	Best Documentary Feature
Boots Riley – Sorry to Bother You: Ari Aster – Hereditary; Paul Dano – Wildlife; Jennifer Fox – The Tale; Jeremiah Zagar – We the Animals	Won't You Be My Neighbor?: Hale County This Morning, This Evening; Minding the Gap; Of Fathers and Sons; On Her Shoulders; Shirkers
Best Cinematography	Best Editing
Sayombhu Mukdeeprom – Suspiria: Ashley Connor – Madeline's Madeline; Diego García – Wildlife; Benjamin Loeb – Mandy; Zak Mulligan – We the Animals	Joe Bini – You Were Never Really Here: Keiko Deguchi, Brian A. Kates, and Jeremiah Zagar – We the Animals; Luke Dunkley, Nick Fenton, Chris Gill, and Julian Hart – American Animals; Anne Fabini, Alex Hall, and Gary Levy – The Tale; Nick Houy – Mid90s
Best International Film
Roma (Mexico): Burning (South Korea); The Favourite (United Kingdom); Happy as Lazzaro (Italy); Shoplifters (Japan)

=== Films with multiple nominations and awards ===
Films that received multiple nominations
Nominations	Film
4	Eighth Grade
4	First Reformed
4	We the Animals
4	You Were Never Really Here
3	If Beale Street Could Talk
3	Leave No Trace
3	Private Life
3	Sócrates
3	The Tale
3	Wildlife
2	A Bread Factory
2	Can You Ever Forgive Me?
2	Hale County This Morning, This Evening
2	Hereditary
2	Madeline's Madeline
2	Minding the Gap
2	Nancy
2	On Her Shoulders
2	Sorry to Bother You
2	Suspiria

Films that won multiple awards
Awards	Film
3	If Beale Street Could Talk
2	Can You Ever Forgive Me?

== Special awards ==
=== John Cassavetes Award ===
En el séptimo día

- A Bread Factory
- Never Goin' Back
- Sócrates
- Thunder Road

=== Robert Altman Award (Best Ensemble) ===
(The award is given to its film director, casting director, and ensemble cast)

- Suspiria

=== Kiehl's Someone to Watch Award ===
Recognizes a talented filmmaker of singular vision who has not yet received appropriate recognition. The award includes a $25,000 unrestricted grant funded by Kiehl's.

- Alex Moratto – Sócrates
  - Ioana Uricaru – Lemonade
  - Jeremiah Zagar – We the Animals

=== The BONNIE Award ===
Recognizes mid-career women directors with a body of work that demonstrates uniqueness of vision and a groundbreaking approach to film making. The award includes a $50,000 unrestricted grant funded by American Airlines.

- Debra Granik
  - Tamara Jenkins
  - Karyn Kusama

=== Piaget Producers Award ===
Honors emerging producers who, despite highly limited resources, demonstrate the creativity, tenacity and vision required to produce quality, independent films. The award includes a $25,000 unrestricted grant funded by Piaget.

- Shrihari Sathe
  - Jonathan Duffy and Kelly Williams
  - Gabrielle Nadig

=== Truer than Fiction Award ===
Presented to an emerging director of non-fiction features who has not yet received significant recognition. The award includes a $25,000 unrestricted grant.

- Bing Liu – Minding the Gap
  - Alexandria Bombach – On Her Shoulders
  - RaMell Ross – Hale County This Morning, This Evening

== See also ==
- 91st Academy Awards
- 76th Golden Globe Awards
- 72nd British Academy Film Awards
- 39th Golden Raspberry Awards
- 25th Screen Actors Guild Awards
- 24th Critics' Choice Awards
