= 7 Prisoners =

2021 film by Alexandre Moratto

- Netflix release poster
- Portuguese: 7 Prisioneiros
- Directed by: Alexandre Moratto
- Screenplay by: Alexandre Moratto; Thayná Mantesso
- Produced by: Ramin Bahrani; Fernando Meirelles
- Starring: Christian Malheiros; Rodrigo Santoro; Bruno Rocha; Vitor Julian; Lucas Oranmian; Cecília Homem de Mello; Dirce Thomaz
- Production company: O2 Filmes
- Distributed by: Netflix
- Release dates: September 6, 2021 (Venice); November 11, 2021 (Netflix)
- Running time: 90 minutes
- Country: Brazil
- Language: Portuguese

7 Prisoners (Portuguese: 7 Prisioneiros) is a 2021 Brazilian thriller-drama film directed by Alexandre Moratto from a screenplay written by Moratto and Thayná Mantesso. The film stars Christian Malheiros and Rodrigo Santoro and premiered at the 78th Venice International Film Festival on September 6, 2021. It was released on Netflix in November 2021.

== Plot ==
18-year-old Mateus leaves the countryside in search for a job opportunity in a São Paulo junkyard. Once there, Mateus and some other boys become a victim of a work system analogous to modern slavery run by Luca, forcing Mateus to make the difficult decision between working for the man who enslaved him or risking his and his family's futures if he is not complicit.

== Cast ==
- Christian Malheiros as Mateus
- Rodrigo Santoro as Luca
- Bruno Rocha
- Vitor Julian as Ezequiel
- Lucas Oranmian as Isaque
- Dirce Thomaz

== Production ==
During an interview with Film Independent on his award-winning directorial debut Sócrates, Brazilian-American filmmaker Alexandre Moratto announced that he was developing an original screenplay about modern slavery and human trafficking in Brazil. Moratto was set to re-team with co-writer Thayná Mantesso on the film. On September 5, 2020, Moratto revealed that he was collaborating again with directors Ramin Bahrani and Fernando Meirelles, through his production company O2 Filmes, to produce the film, with Netflix distributing. Bahrani, Moratto's film school mentor, presented the film to the company while directing The White Tiger. Speaking about the film, Moratto said:

Right now I feel like I'm in this really fortunate place of being able to make these films from these original scripts that I've been writing about issues or people or communities or personal matters that are very important to me and that I feel the need to express.

The lead role of the film was written by Moratto specifically for Christian Malheiros, whom he discovered during intensive auditions for Sócrates where he was ultimately cast and rose to Brazilian prominence. Moratto also cast a Brazilian immigrant who worked for six months in a sweatshop while he was conducting research interviews with survivors of human trafficking.

== Release ==
The film had its world premiere at the 78th Venice International Film Festival in the Horizons Extra section on September 6, 2021, which is set to be followed by its North American premiere at the 2021 Toronto International Film Festival in the Contemporary World Cinema section. After its festival screening, the film was released on Netflix globally in November 2021.

== Reception ==
On review aggregator Rotten Tomatoes, 98% of 45 critics have given the film a positive review, with an average rating of 7.5/10.
