= Independent Spirit Award for Best Male Lead =

Discontinued annual award at the Independent Spirit Awards

- Presented by: Independent Spirit Awards
- First award: M. Emmet Walsh; Blood Simple (1986)
- Final award: Simon Rex; Red Rocket (2021)
- Website: spiritawards.com

The Independent Spirit Award for Best Male Lead was an award presented annually at the Independent Spirit Awards to honor an actor who has delivered an outstanding lead performance in an independent film. It was first presented in 1985, with M. Emmet Walsh being the first recipient of the award for his role as Investigator Loren Visser in Blood Simple. It was last presented in 2022 with Simon Rex being the final recipient of the award for his role in Red Rocket.

Jeff Bridges and Philip Seymour Hoffman are the only actors who have received this award more than once, with two wins each.

In 2022, it was announced that the four acting categories would be retired and replaced with two gender neutral categories, with both Best Male Lead and Best Female Lead merging into the Best Lead Performance category.

== Winners and nominees ==
=== 1980s ===
Year	Winner and nominees	Film	Role
1985	M. Emmet Walsh	Blood Simple	Investigator Loren Visser
1985	Rubén Blades	Crossover Dreams	Rudy Veloz
1985	Tom Bower	Wildrose	Rick Ogaard
1985	Treat Williams	Smooth Talk	Arnold Friend
1986	James Woods	Salvador	Richard Boyle
1986	Roberto Benigni	Down by Law	Roberto
1986	Willem Dafoe	Platoon	Sgt. Elias
1986	Dennis Hopper	Blue Velvet	Frank Booth
1986	Victor Love	Native Son	Bigger Thomas
1987	Dennis Quaid	The Big Easy	Det. Remy McSwain
1987	Spalding Gray	Swimming to Cambodia	Himself
1987	Terry O'Quinn	The Stepfather	Jerry Blake
1987	Mickey Rourke	Barfly	Henry Chinaski
1987	James Woods	Best Seller	Cleve
1988	Edward James Olmos	Stand and Deliver	Jaime Escalante
1988	Eric Bogosian	Talk Radio	Barry Champlain
1988	Harvey Fierstein	Torch Song Trilogy	Arnold Beckoff
1988	Chris Mulkey	Patti Rocks	Billy Regis
1988	James Woods	The Boost	Lenny Brown
1989	Matt Dillon	Drugstore Cowboy	Bob Hughes
1989	Nicolas Cage	Vampire's Kiss	Peter Loew
1989	Charles Lane	Sidewalk Stories	Artist
1989	Randy Quaid	Parents	Nick Laemle
1989	James Spader	Sex, Lies, and Videotape	Graham Dalton

=== 1990s ===
Year	Winner and nominees	Film	Role
1990	Danny Glover	To Sleep with Anger	Harry
1990	Martin Priest	The Plot Against Harry	Harry Plotnick
1990	Christopher Reid	House Party	Kid
1990	Michael Rooker	Henry: Portrait of a Serial Killer	Henry
1990	Christian Slater	Pump Up the Volume	Mark Hunter
1991	River Phoenix	My Own Private Idaho	Mike "Mikey" Waters
1991	Doug E. Doug	Hangin' with the Homeboys	Willie
1991	Robert Duvall	Rambling Rose	Daddy Hillyer
1991	Gary Oldman	Rosencrantz & Guildenstern Are Dead	Rosencrantz
1991	William Russ	Pastime	Roy Dean Bream
1992	Harvey Keitel	Bad Lieutenant	The Lieutenant
1992	Craig Chester	Swoon	Nathan Leopold, Jr.
1992	Laurence Fishburne	Deep Cover	Russell Stevens / John Hull
1992	Peter Greene	Laws of Gravity	Jimmy
1992	Michael Rapaport	Zebrahead	Zack
1993	Jeff Bridges	American Heart	Jack Kelson
1993	Vincent D'Onofrio	Household Saints	Joseph Santangelo
1993	Mitchell Lichtenstein	The Wedding Banquet	Simon
1993	Matthew Modine	Equinox	Henry Petosa / Freddy Ace
1993	Tyrin Turner	Menace II Society	Caine
1994	Samuel L. Jackson	Pulp Fiction	Jules Winnfield
1994	Sihung Lung	Eat Drink Man Woman	Chu
1994	William H. Macy	Oleanna	John
1994	Campbell Scott	Mrs. Parker and the Vicious Circle	Robert Benchley
1994	Jon Seda	I Like It Like That	Chino Linares
1995	Sean Penn	Dead Man Walking	Matthew Poncelet
1995	Nicolas Cage	Leaving Las Vegas	Ben Sanderson
1995	Tim Roth	Little Odessa	Joshua Shapira
1995	Jimmy Smits	My Family	Jimmy Sánchez
1995	Kevin Spacey	Swimming with Sharks	Buddy Ackerman
1996	William H. Macy	Fargo	Jerry Lundegaard
1996	Chris Cooper	Lone Star	Sheriff Sam Deeds
1996	Chris Penn	The Funeral	Chez
1996	Tony Shalhoub	Big Night	Primo
1996	Stanley Tucci	Big Night	Secondo
1997	Robert Duvall	The Apostle	Euliss "Sonny" Dewey / The Apostle E.F.
1997	Peter Fonda	Ulee's Gold	Ulysses "Ulee" Jackson
1997	Christopher Guest	Waiting for Guffman	Corky St. Clair
1997	Philip Baker Hall	Hard Eight	Sydney Brown
1997	John Turturro	Box of Moon Light	Al Fountain
1998	Ian McKellen	Gods and Monsters	James Whale
1998	Dylan Baker	Happiness	Bill Maplewood
1998	Nick Nolte	Affliction	Wade Whitehouse
1998	Sean Penn	Hurlyburly	Eddie
1998	Courtney B. Vance	Blind Faith	John Williams
1999	Richard Farnsworth	The Straight Story	Alvin Straight
1999	John Cusack	Being John Malkovich	Craig Schwartz
1999	Terence Stamp	The Limey	Wilson
1999	David Strathairn	Limbo	Joe "Jumpin" Gastineau
1999	Noble Willingham	The Corndog Man	Ace Barker

=== 2000s ===
Year	Winner and nominees	Film	Role
2000	Javier Bardem	Before Night Falls	Reinaldo Arenas
2000	Adrien Brody	Restaurant	Chris Calloway
2000	Billy Crudup	Jesus' Son	FH
2000	Hill Harper	The Visit	Alex Waters
2000	Mark Ruffalo	You Can Count on Me	Terry Prescott
2001	Tom Wilkinson	In the Bedroom	Matt Fowler
2001	Brian Cox	L.I.E.	Big John Harrigan
2001	Ryan Gosling	The Believer	Danny Balint
2001	Jake Gyllenhaal	Donnie Darko	Donnie Darko
2001	John Cameron Mitchell	Hedwig and the Angry Inch	Hansel Schmidt / Hedwig Robinson
2002	Derek Luke	Antwone Fisher	Antwone "Fish" Fisher
2002	Graham Greene	Skins	Mogie Yellow Lodge
2002	Danny Huston	Ivans Xtc	Ivan Beckman
2002	Jeremy Renner	Dahmer	Jeffrey Dahmer
2002	Campbell Scott	Roger Dodger	Roger Swanson
2003	Bill Murray	Lost in Translation	Bob Harris
2003	Peter Dinklage	The Station Agent	Finbar McBride
2003	Paul Giamatti	American Splendor	Harvey Pekar
2003	Ben Kingsley	House of Sand and Fog	Massoud Amir Behrani
2003	Lee Pace	Soldier's Girl	Calpernia Addams / Scottie
2004	Paul Giamatti	Sideways	Miles Raymond
2004	Kevin Bacon	The Woodsman	Walter
2004	Jeff Bridges	The Door in the Floor	Ted Cole
2004	Jamie Foxx	Redemption	Stan Tookie Williams
2004	Liam Neeson	Kinsey	Alfred Kinsey
2005	Philip Seymour Hoffman	Capote	Truman Capote
2005	Jeff Daniels	The Squid and the Whale	Bernard Berkman
2005	Terrence Howard	Hustle & Flow	DJay
2005	Heath Ledger	Brokeback Mountain	Ennis Del Mar
2005	David Strathairn	Good Night, and Good Luck.	Edward R. Murrow
2006	Ryan Gosling	Half Nelson	Dan Dunne
2006	Aaron Eckhart	Thank You for Smoking	Nick Naylor
2006	Edward Norton	The Painted Veil	Walter Fane
2006	Ahmad Razvi	Man Push Cart	Ahmad
2006	Forest Whitaker	American Gun	Carter
2007	Philip Seymour Hoffman	The Savages	Jon Savage
2007	Pedro Castaneda	August Evening	Jaime
2007	Don Cheadle	Talk to Me	Petey Greene
2007	Frank Langella	Starting Out in the Evening	Leonard Schiller
2007	Tony Leung	Lust, Caution	Mr. Yee
2008	Mickey Rourke	The Wrestler	Randy "The Ram" Robinson
2008	Javier Bardem	Vicky Cristina Barcelona	Juan Antonio Gonzalo
2008	Richard Jenkins	The Visitor	Walter Vale
2008	Sean Penn	Milk	Harvey Milk
2008	Jeremy Renner	The Hurt Locker	Staff Sgt. First Class William James
2009	Jeff Bridges	Crazy Heart	Otis "Bad" Blake
2009	Colin Firth	A Single Man	George Falconer
2009	Joseph Gordon-Levitt	(500) Days of Summer	Tom Hansen
2009	Souleymane Sy Savane	Goodbye Solo	Solo
2009	Adam Scott	The Vicious Kind	Caleb Sinclaire

=== 2010s ===
Year	Winner and nominees	Film	Role
2010	James Franco	127 Hours	Aron Ralston
2010	Ronald Bronstein	Daddy Longlegs	Lenny Sokol
2010	Aaron Eckhart	Rabbit Hole	Howie Corbett
2010	John C. Reilly	Cyrus	John Kilpatrick
2010	Ben Stiller	Greenberg	Roger Greenberg
2011	Jean Dujardin	The Artist	George Valentin
2011	Demián Bichir	A Better Life	Carlos Galindo
2011	Ryan Gosling	Drive	Driver
2011	Woody Harrelson	Rampart	Dave Brown
2011	Michael Shannon	Take Shelter	Curtis LaForche
2012	John Hawkes	The Sessions	Mark O'Brien
2012	Jack Black	Bernie	Bernie Tiede
2012	Bradley Cooper	Silver Linings Playbook	Patrick "Pat" Solitano, Jr.
2012	Thure Lindhardt	Keep the Lights On	Erik
2012	Matthew McConaughey	Killer Joe	Joe "Killer" Cooper
2012	Wendell Pierce	Four	Joe
2013	Matthew McConaughey	Dallas Buyers Club	Ron Woodroof
2013	Bruce Dern	Nebraska	Woody Grant
2013	Chiwetel Ejiofor	12 Years a Slave	Solomon Northup
2013	Oscar Isaac	Inside Llewyn Davis	Llewyn Davis
2013	Michael B. Jordan	Fruitvale Station	Oscar Grant III
2013	Robert Redford	All Is Lost	Our Man
2014	Michael Keaton	Birdman	Riggan Thomson
2014	André 3000	Jimi: All Is by My Side	Jimi Hendrix
2014	Jake Gyllenhaal	Nightcrawler	Louis "Lou" Bloom
2014	John Lithgow	Love Is Strange	Ben
2014	David Oyelowo	Selma	Martin Luther King Jr.
2015	Abraham Attah	Beasts of No Nation	Agu
2015	Christopher Abbott	James White	James White
2015	Ben Mendelsohn	Mississippi Grind	Gerry
2015	Jason Segel	The End of the Tour	David Foster Wallace
2015	Koudous Seihon	Mediterranea	Aviva
2016	Casey Affleck	Manchester by the Sea	Lee Chandler
2016	David Harewood	Free in Deed	Abe Wilkins
2016	Viggo Mortensen	Captain Fantastic	Ben Cash
2016	Jesse Plemons	Other People	David Mulcahey
2016	Tim Roth	Chronic	David Wilson
2017	Timothée Chalamet	Call Me by Your Name	Elio Perlman
2017	Harris Dickinson	Beach Rats	Frankie
2017	James Franco	The Disaster Artist	Tommy Wiseau
2017	Daniel Kaluuya	Get Out	Chris Washington
2017	Robert Pattinson	Good Time	Constantine "Connie" Nikas
2018	Ethan Hawke	First Reformed	Ernst Toller
2018	John Cho	Searching	David Kim
2018	Daveed Diggs	Blindspotting	Collin Hoskins
2018	Christian Malheiros	Sócrates	Sócrates
2018	Joaquin Phoenix	You Were Never Really Here	Joe
2019	Adam Sandler	Uncut Gems	Howard Ratner
2019	Chris Galust	Give Me Liberty	Vic
2019	Kelvin Harrison Jr.	Luce	Luce Edgar
2019	Robert Pattinson	The Lighthouse	Thomas Howard
2019	Matthias Schoenaerts	The Mustang	Roman Coleman

=== 2020s ===
Year	Winner and nominees	Film	Role
2020	Riz Ahmed	Sound of Metal	Ruben Stone
2020	Chadwick Boseman (posthumous)	Ma Rainey's Black Bottom	Levee Green
2020	Adarsh Gourav	The White Tiger	Balram Halwai
2020	Rob Morgan	Bull	Abe
2020	Steven Yeun	Minari	Jacob Yi
2021	Simon Rex	Red Rocket	Mikey Saber
2021	Clifton Collins Jr.	Jockey	Jackson Silva
2021	Frankie Faison	The Killing of Kenneth Chamberlain	Kenneth Chamberlain Sr.
2021	Michael Greyeyes	Wild Indian	Makwa ("Michael Peterson")
2021	Udo Kier	Swan Song	Pat Pitsenbarger

== Multiple nominees ==
2 nominations

- Javier Bardem
- Nicolas Cage
- Robert Duvall
- Aaron Eckhart
- James Franco
- Paul Giamatti
- Jake Gyllenhaal
- Philip Seymour Hoffman
- William H. Macy
- Matthew McConaughey
- Robert Pattinson
- Jeremy Renner
- Tim Roth
- Mickey Rourke
- Campbell Scott
- David Strathairn

3 nominations

- Jeff Bridges
- Ryan Gosling
- Sean Penn
- James Woods

== Multiple winners ==
2 wins

- Jeff Bridges
- Philip Seymour Hoffman

=== Various winners ===
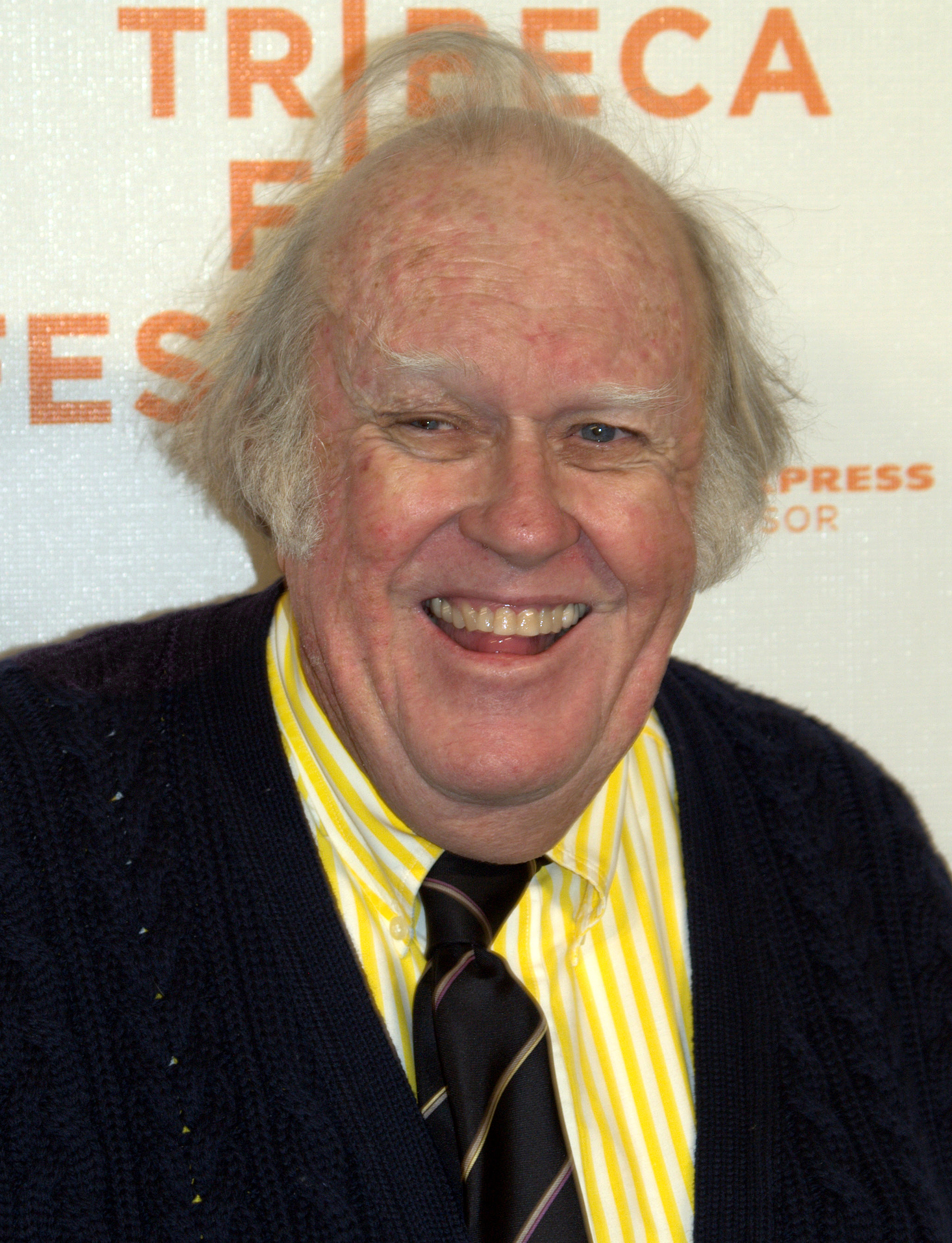
M. Emmet Walsh won for Blood Simple.

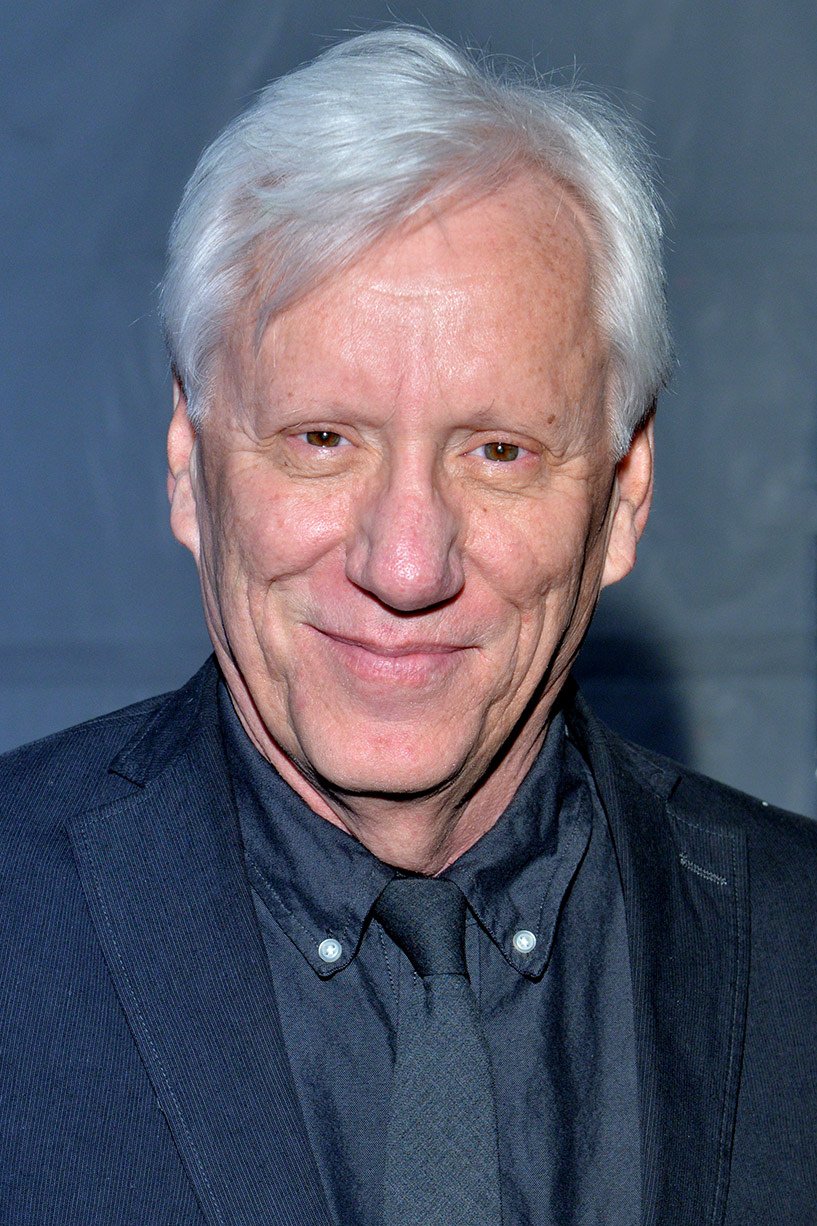
James Woods won for Salvador.

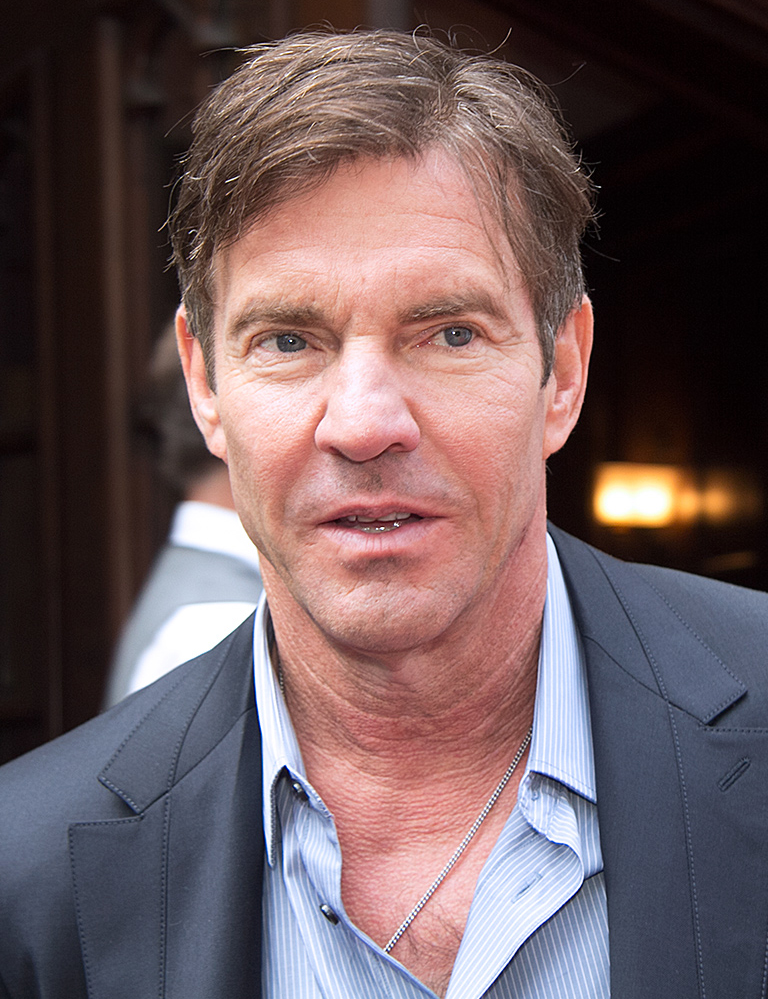
Dennis Quaid won for The Big Easy.

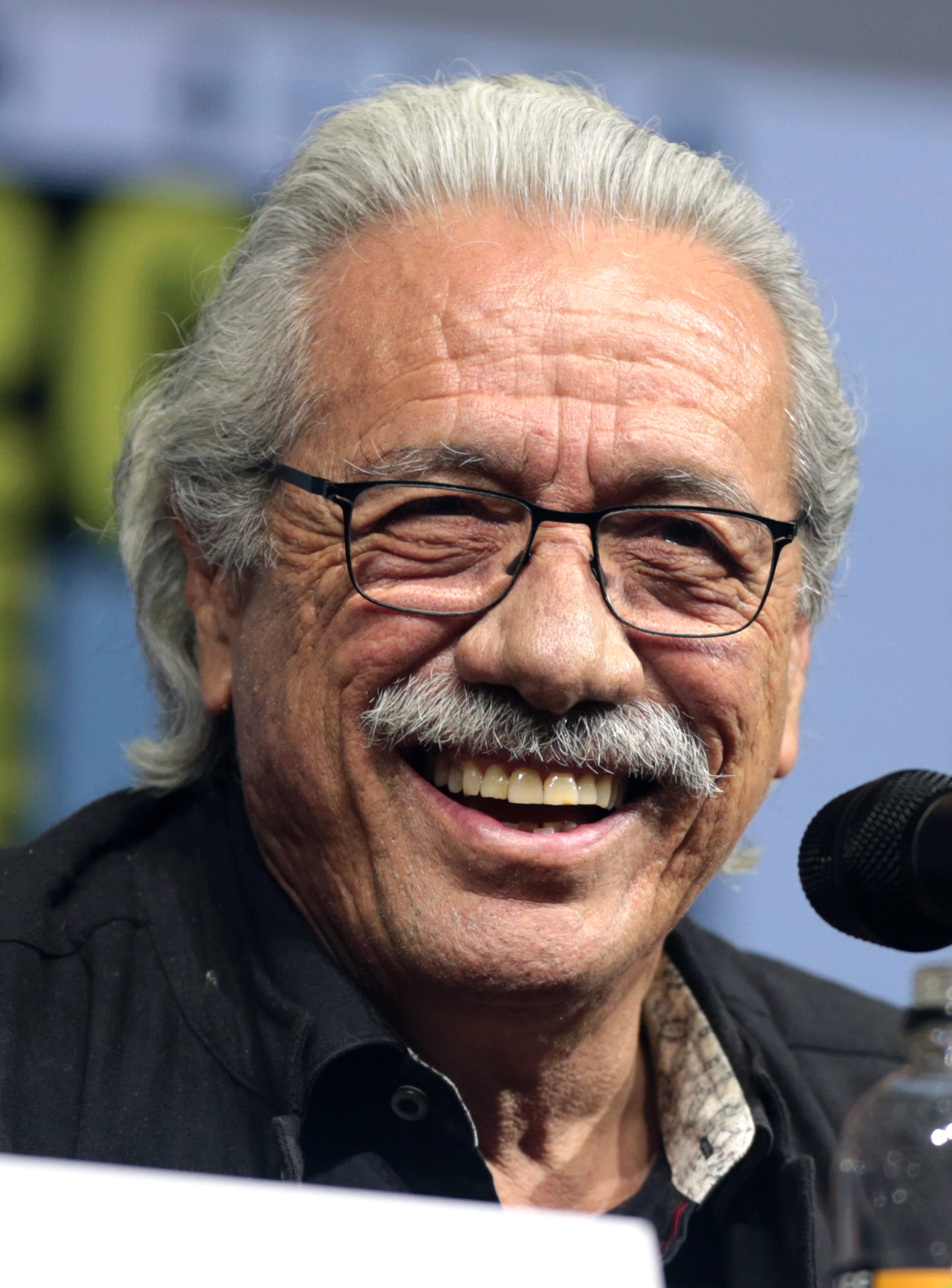
Edward James Olmos won for Stand and Deliver.

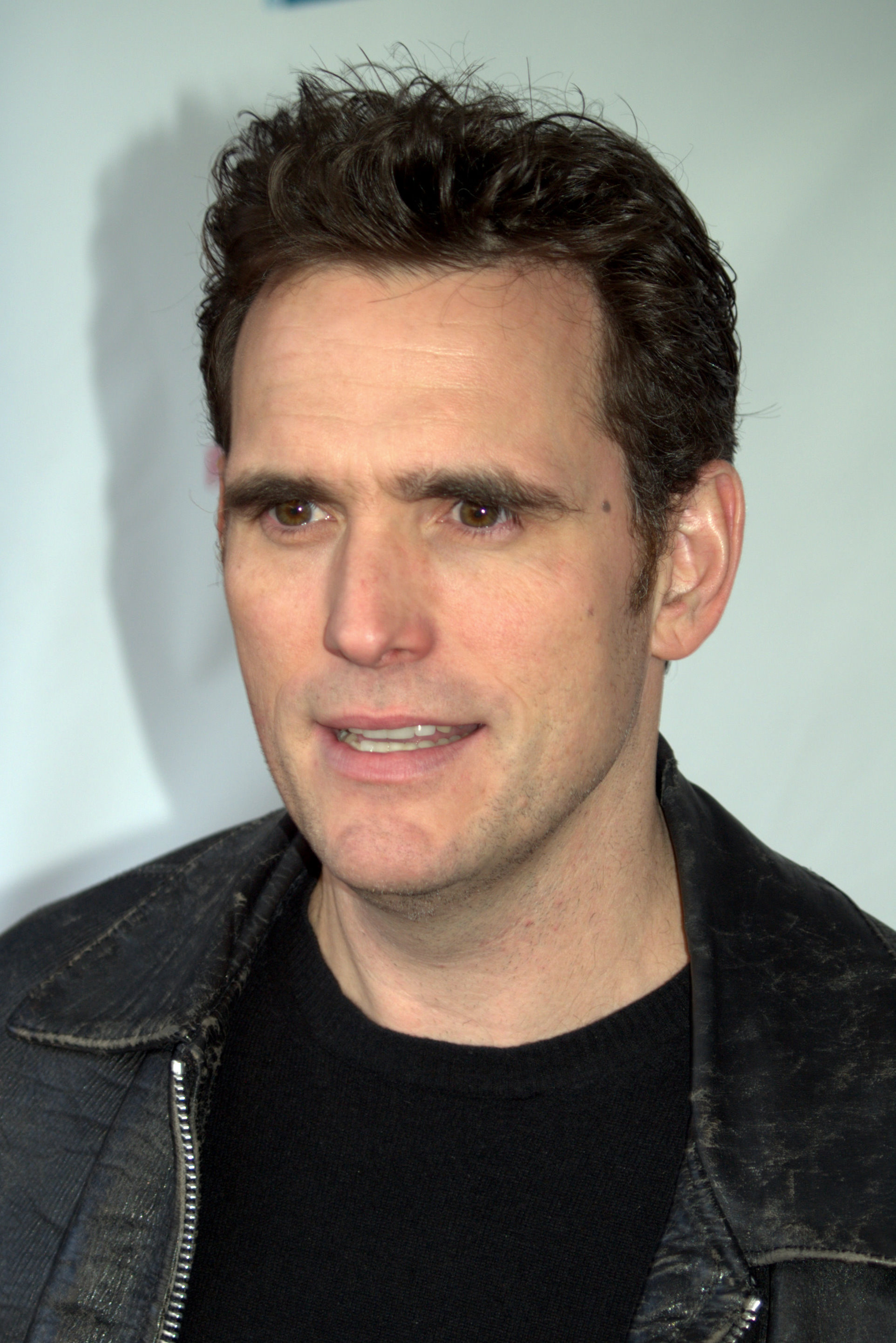
Matt Dillon won for Drugstore Cowboy.

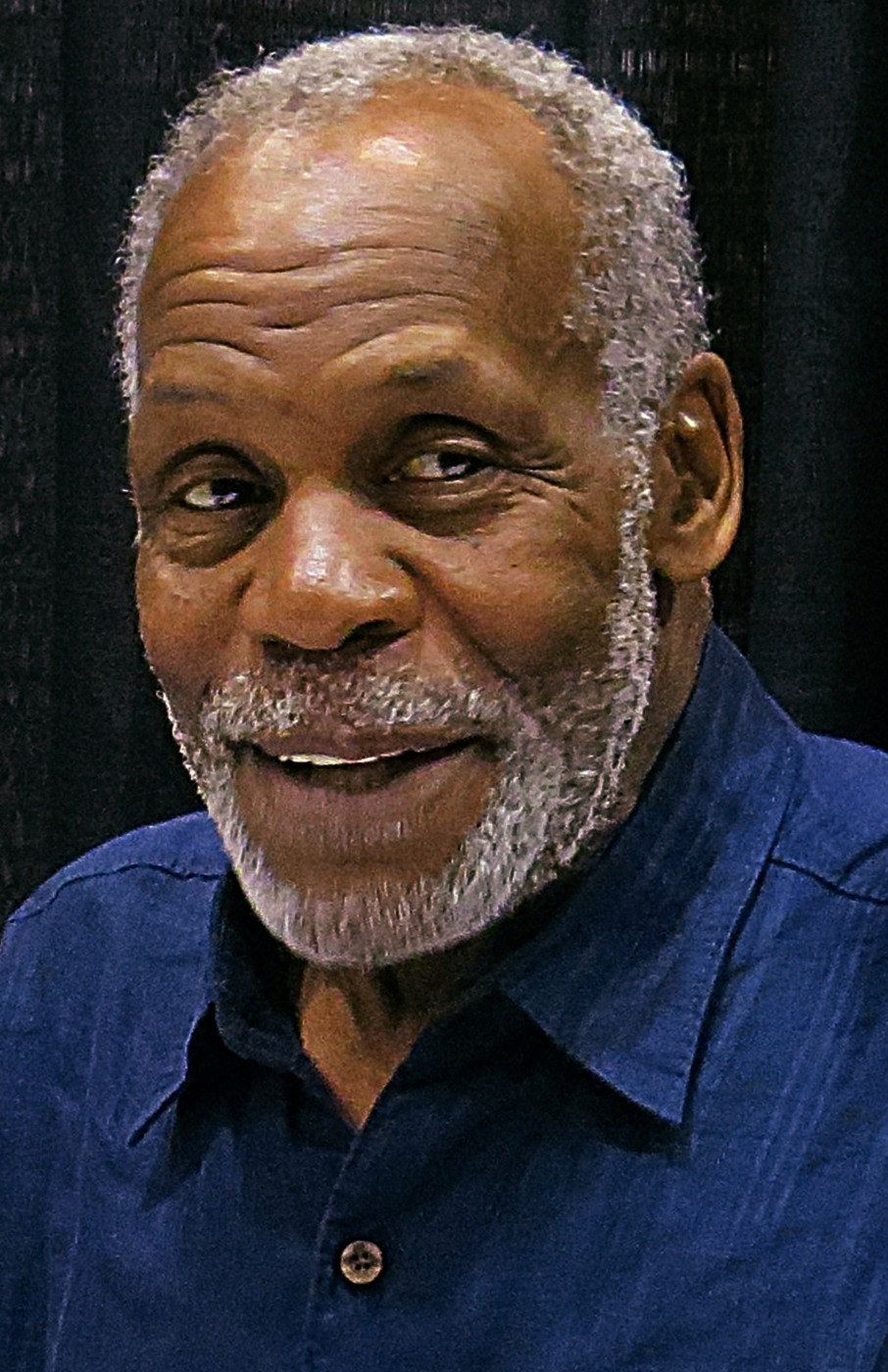
Danny Glover won for To Sleep with Anger.

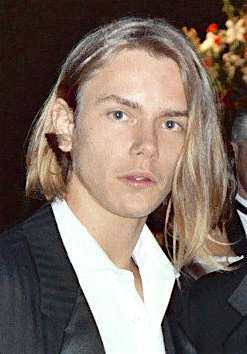
River Phoenix won for My Own Private Idaho.

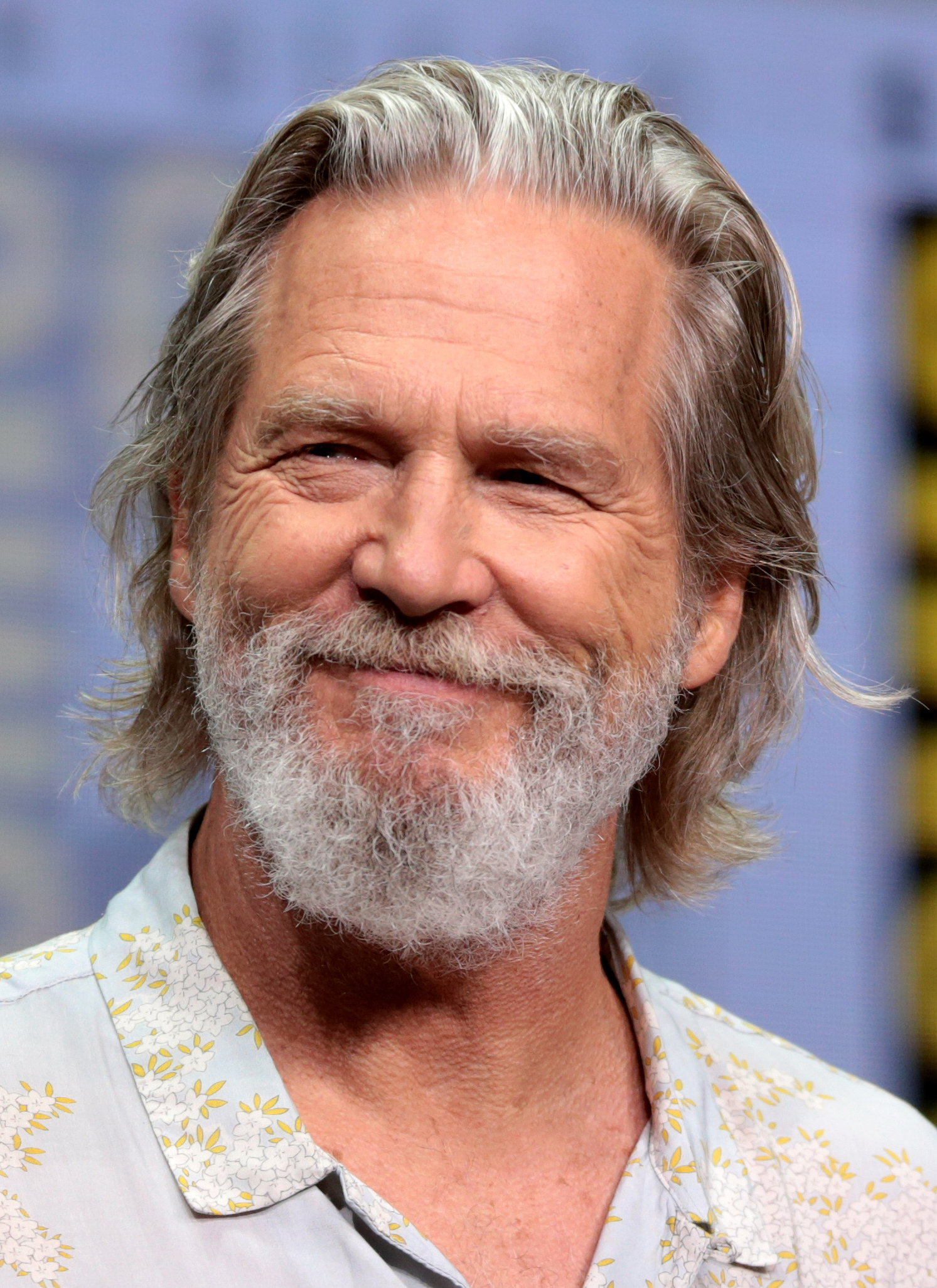
Jeff Bridges has won the award for American Heart (1993) and Crazy Heart (2009).

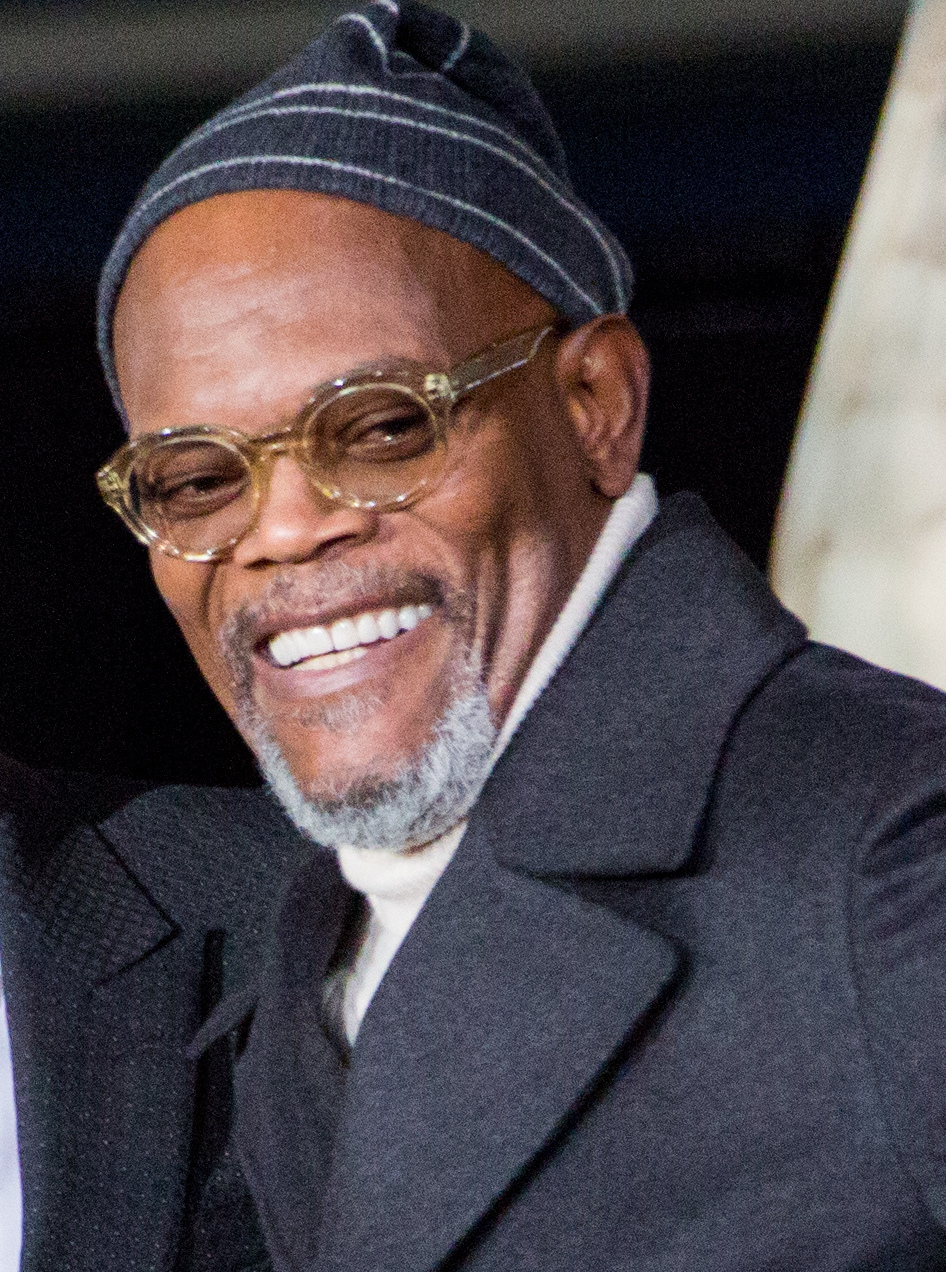
Samuel L. Jackson won for Pulp Fiction.

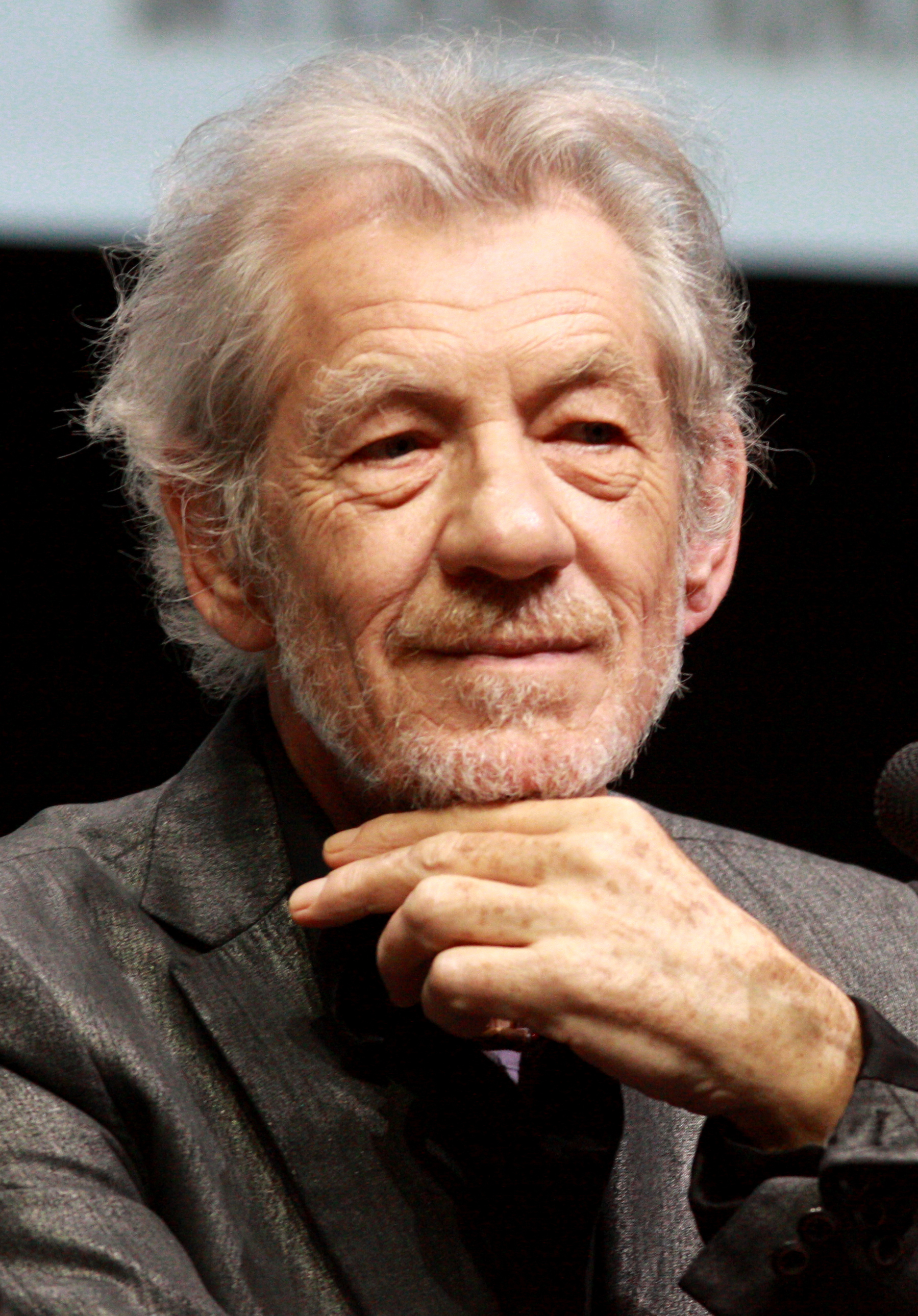
Ian McKellen won for God and Monsters.

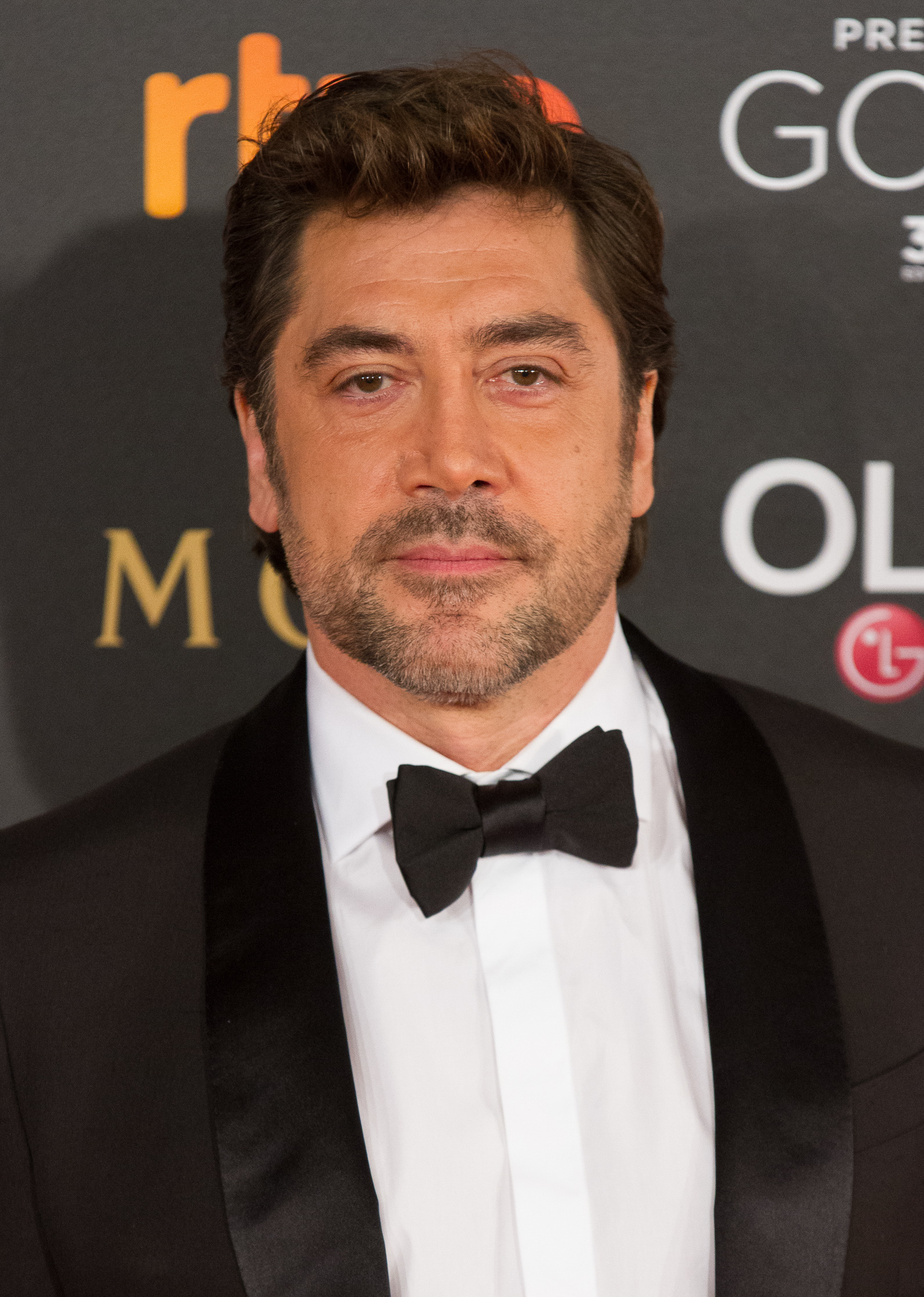
Javier Bardem won for Before Night Falls.

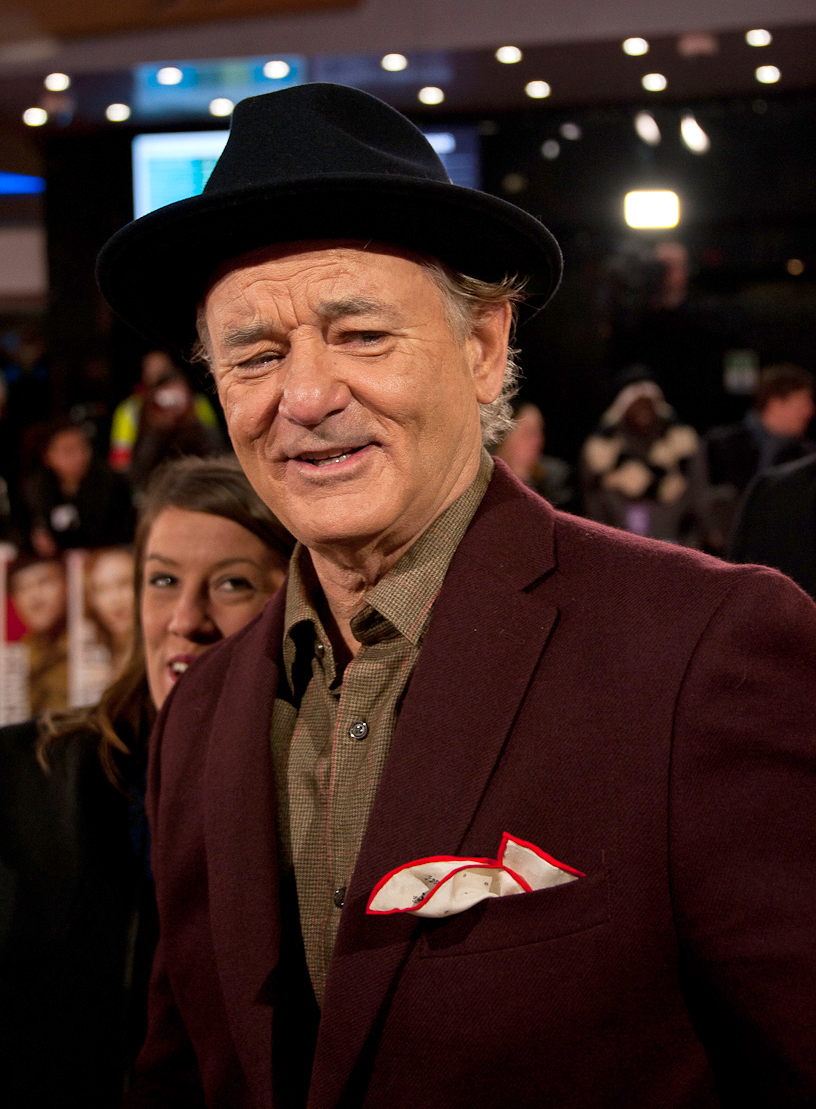
Bill Murray won for Lost in Translation.

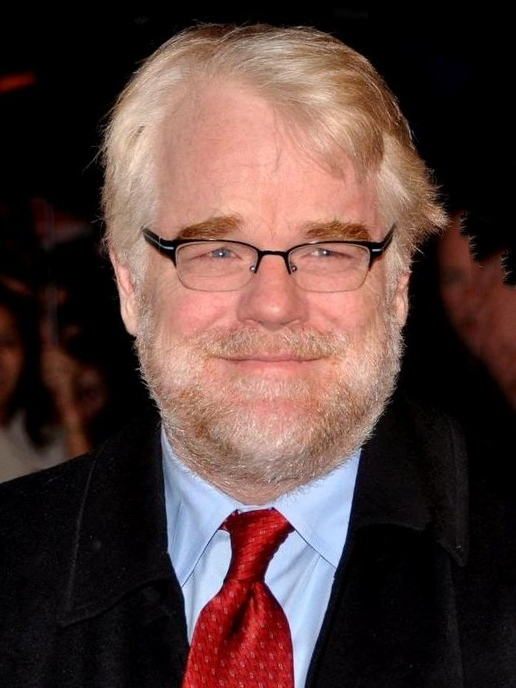
Philip Seymour Hoffman has won for Capote (2005) and The Savages (2007).

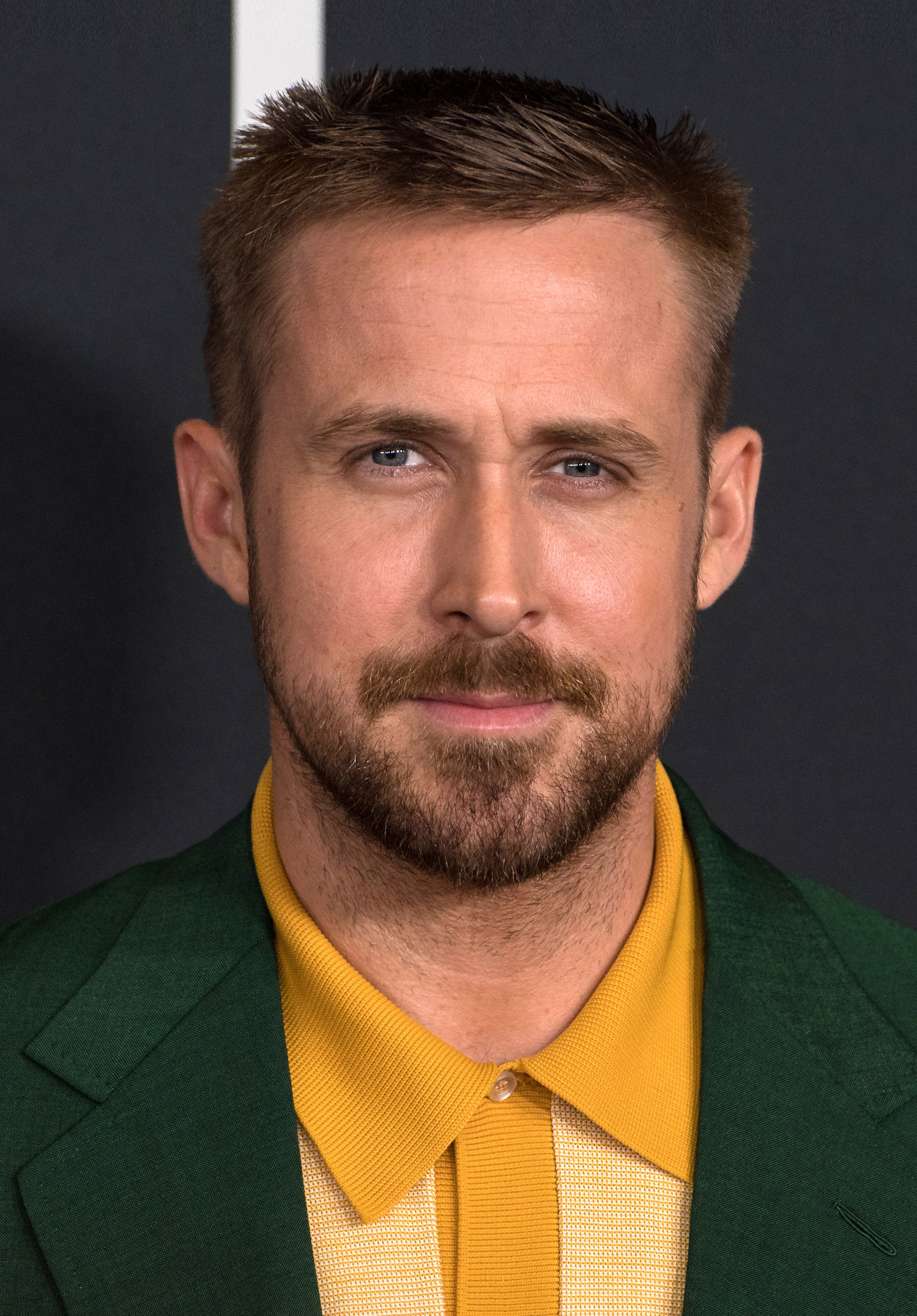
Ryan Gosling won for Half Nelson (2006).

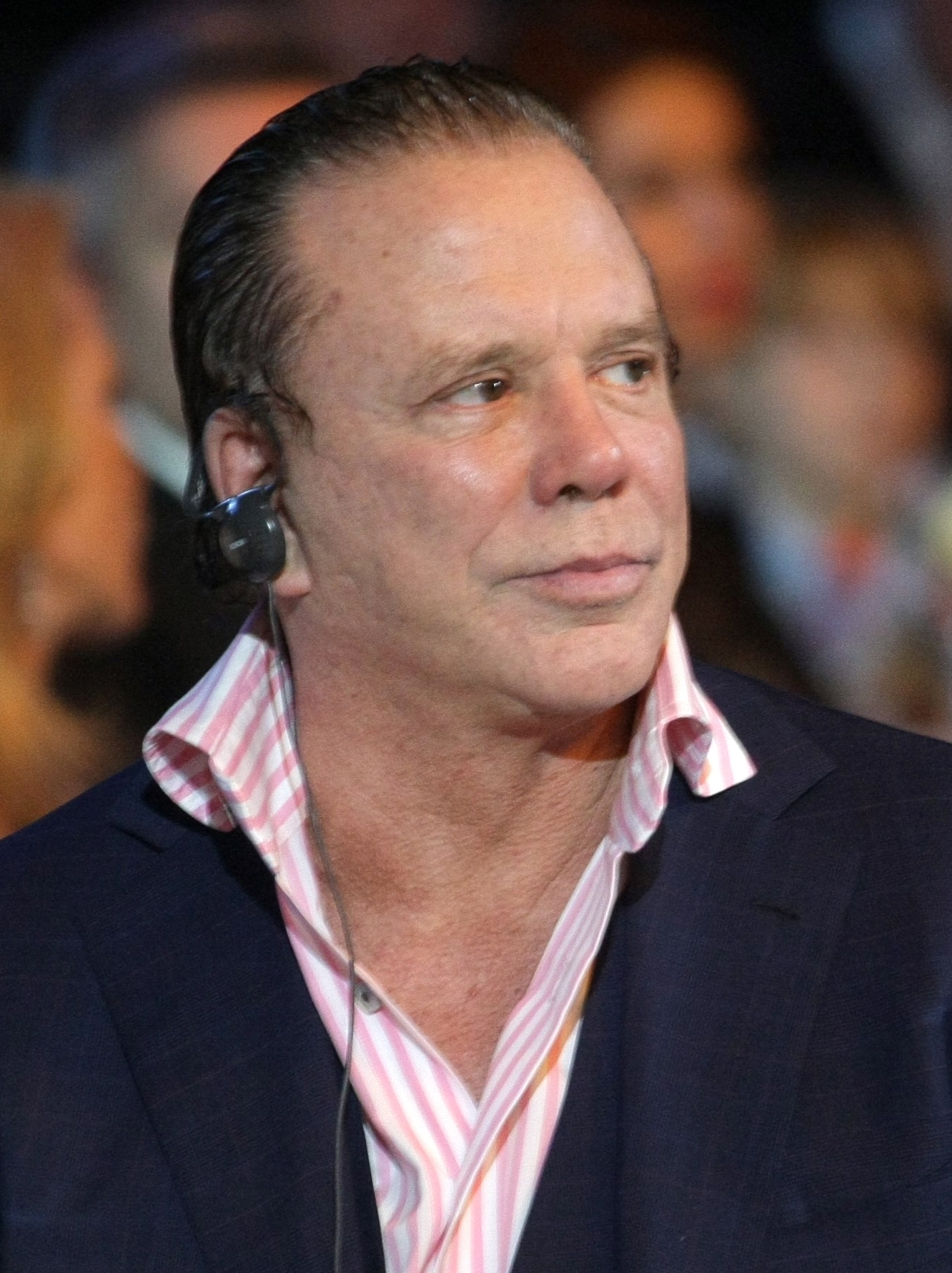
Mickey Rourke won for The Wrestler.

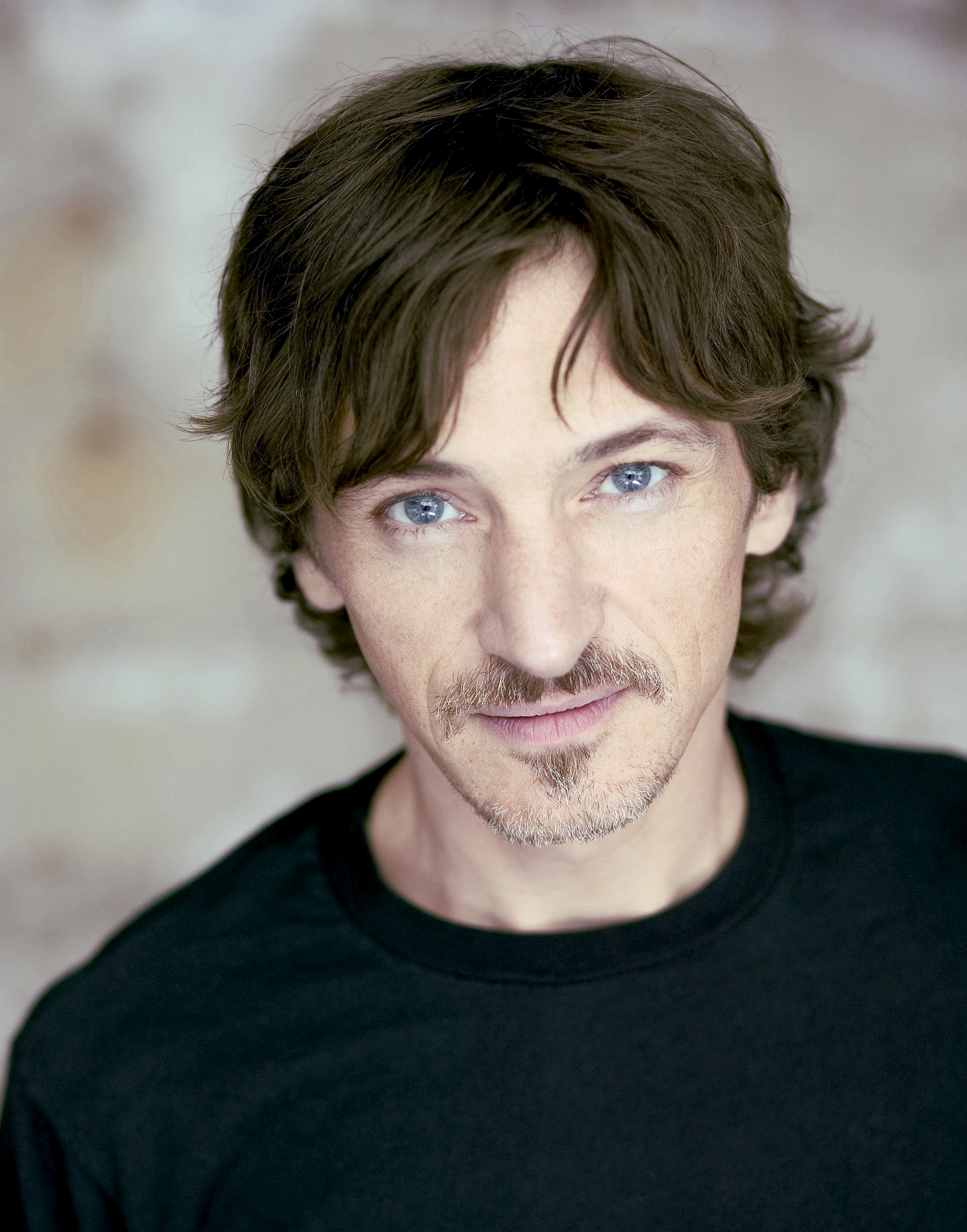
John Hawkes won for The Sessions.

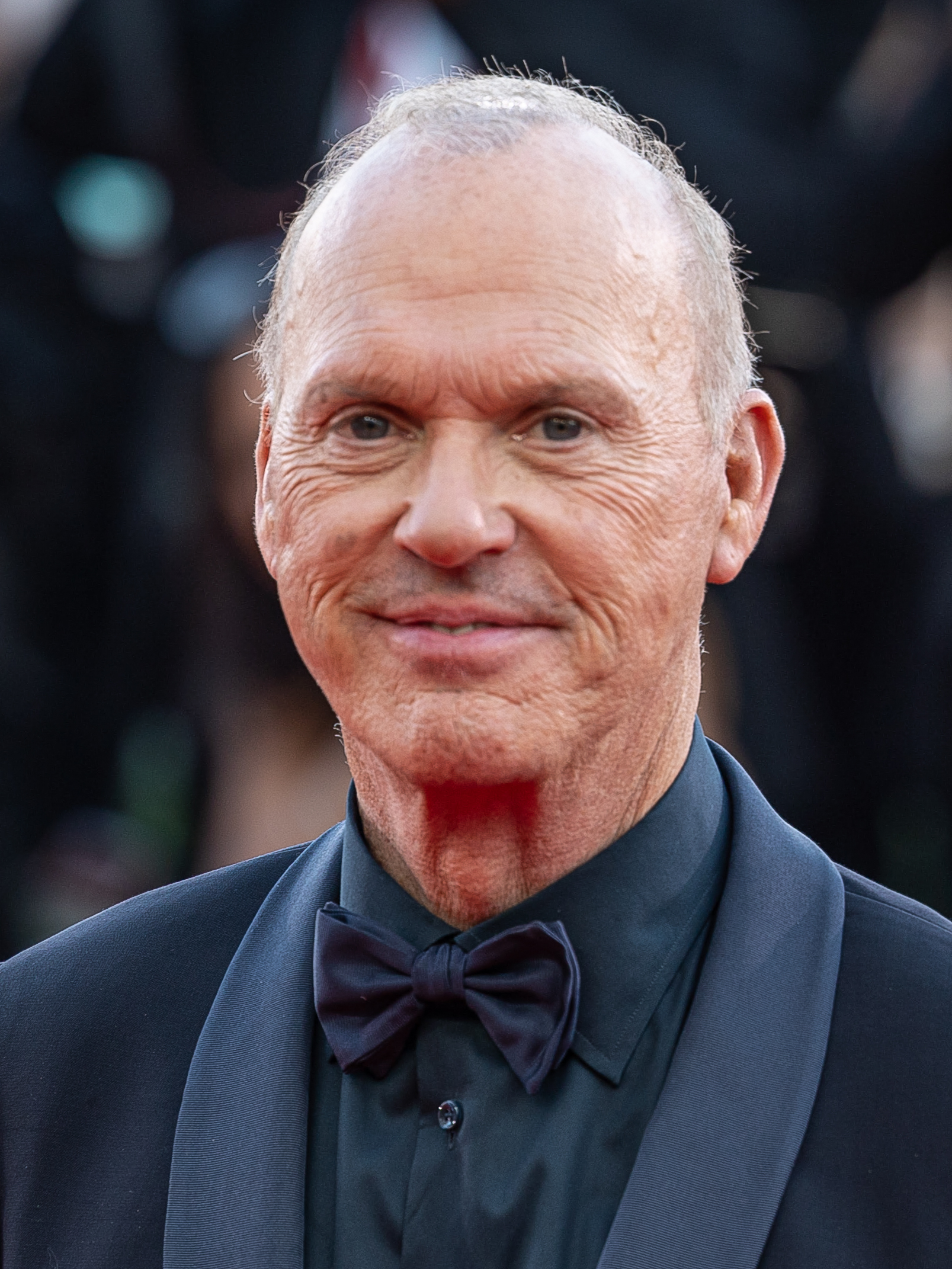
Michael Keaton won for Birdman.

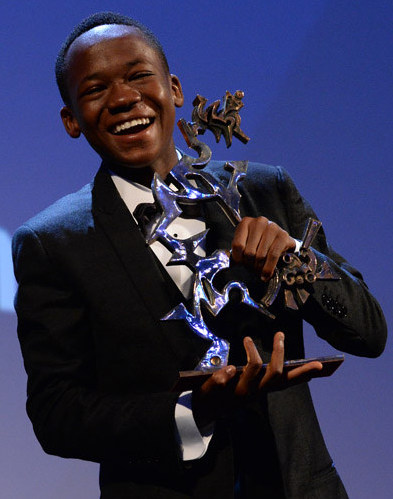
Abraham Attah won for Beasts of No Nation.

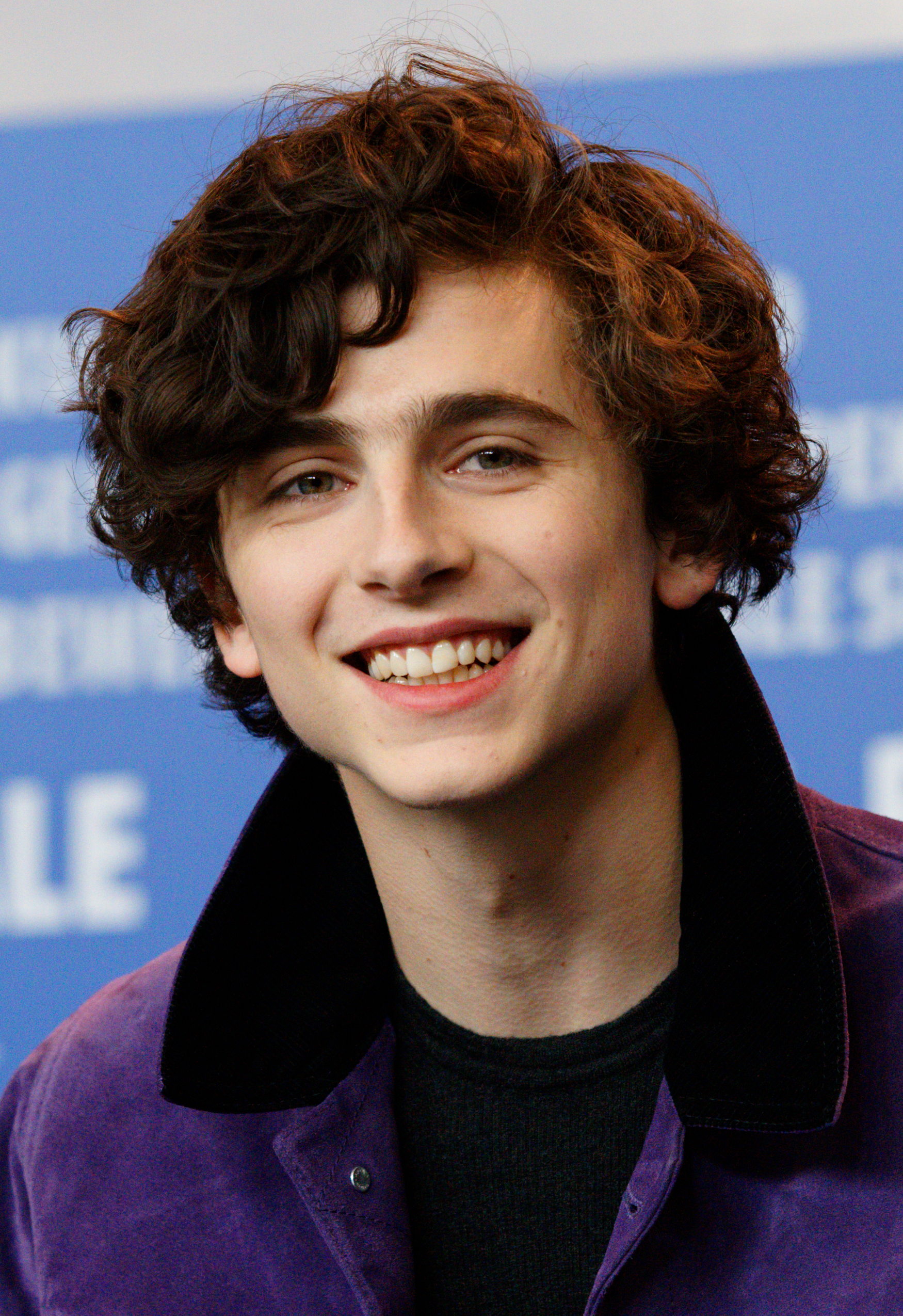
Timothée Chalamet won for Call Me by Your Name.

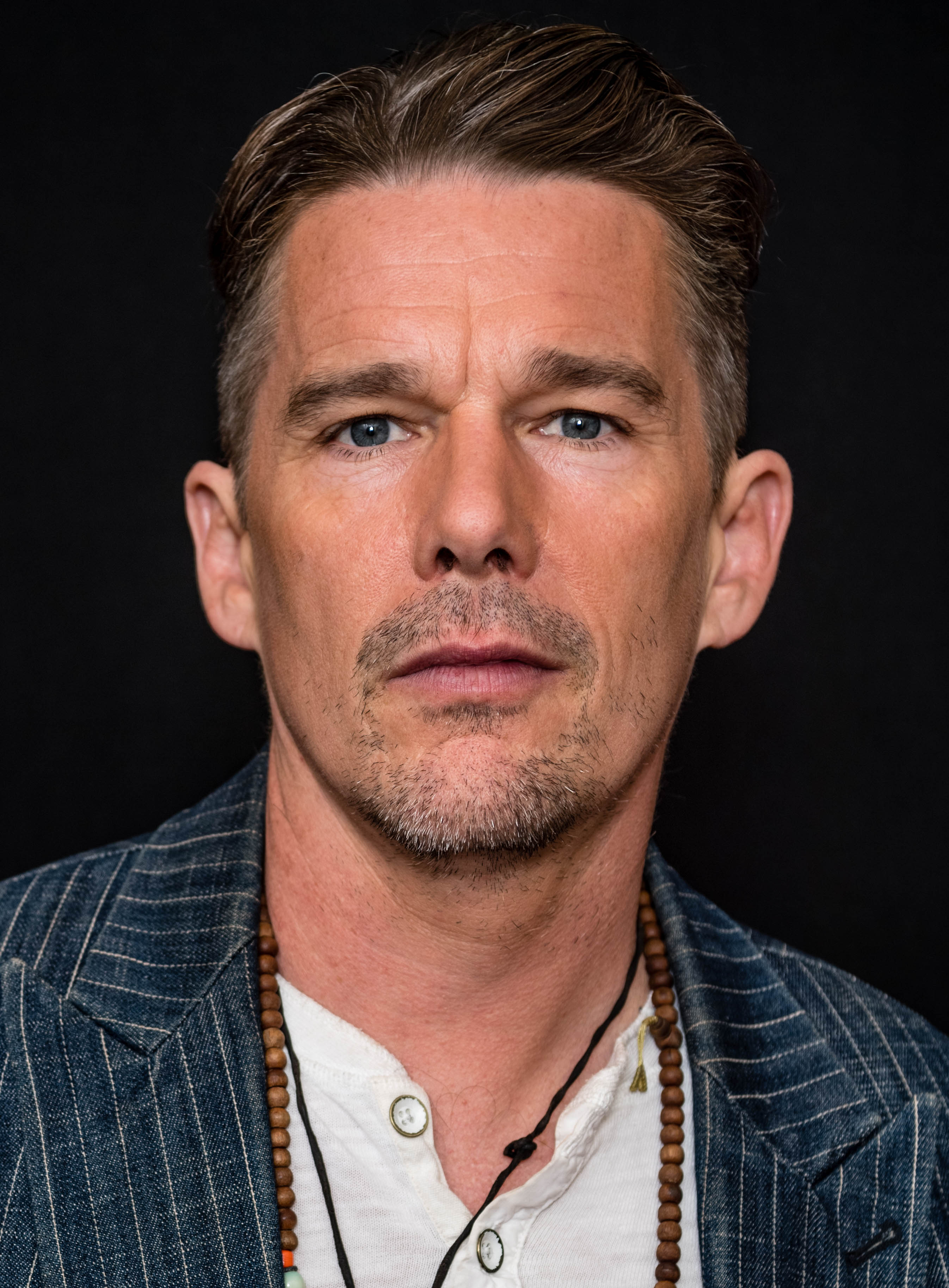
Ethan Hawke won for First Reformed.

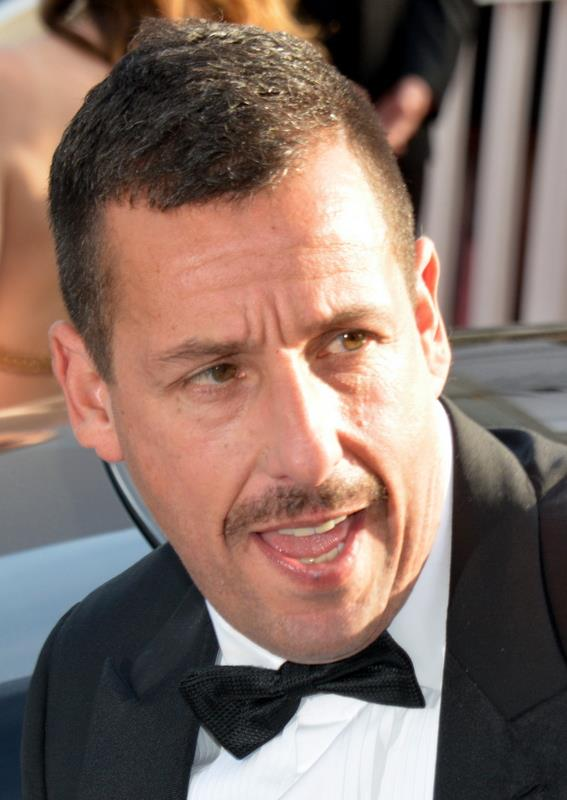
Adam Sandler won for Uncut Gems.

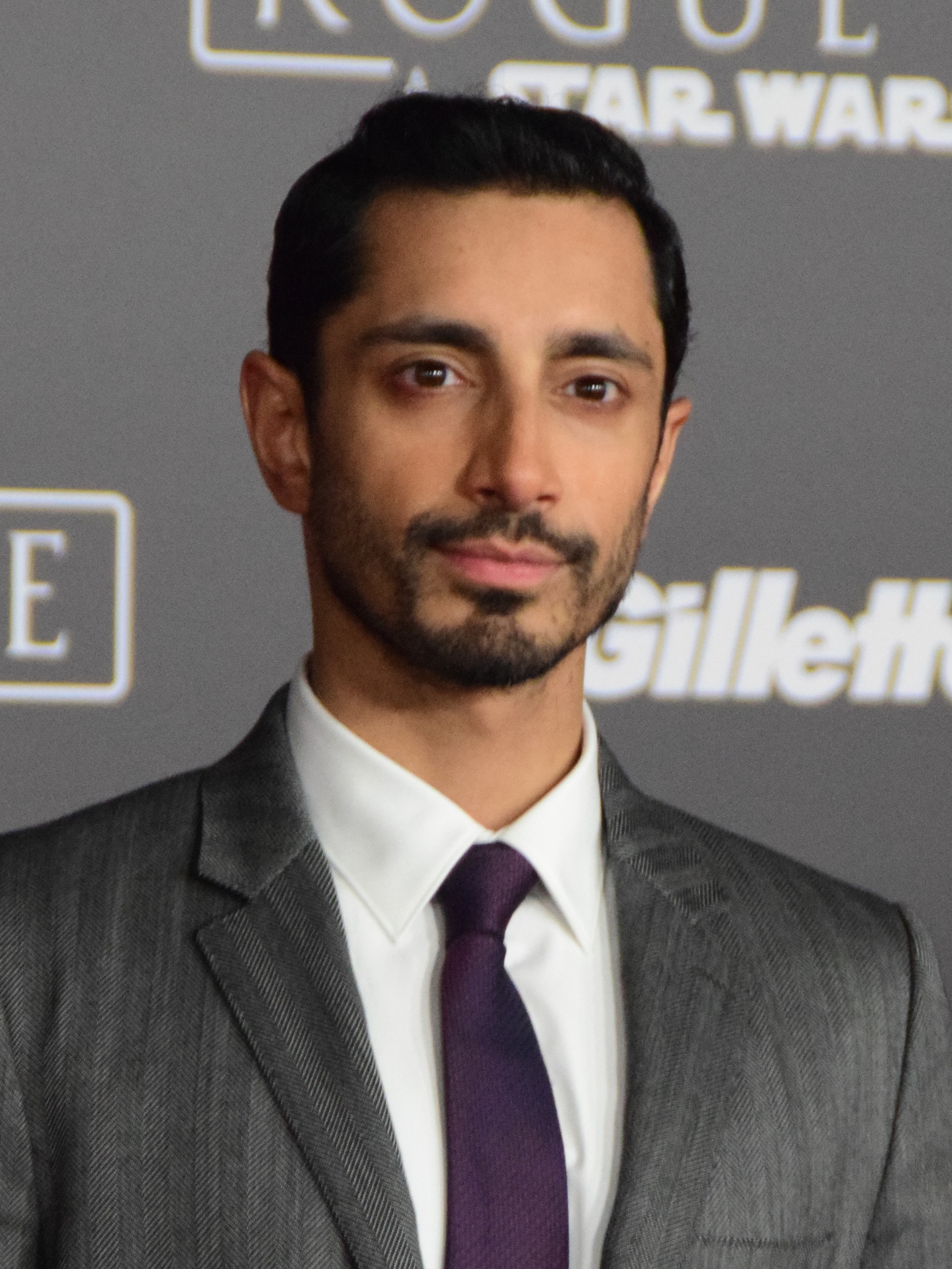
Riz Ahmed won for Sound of Metal.

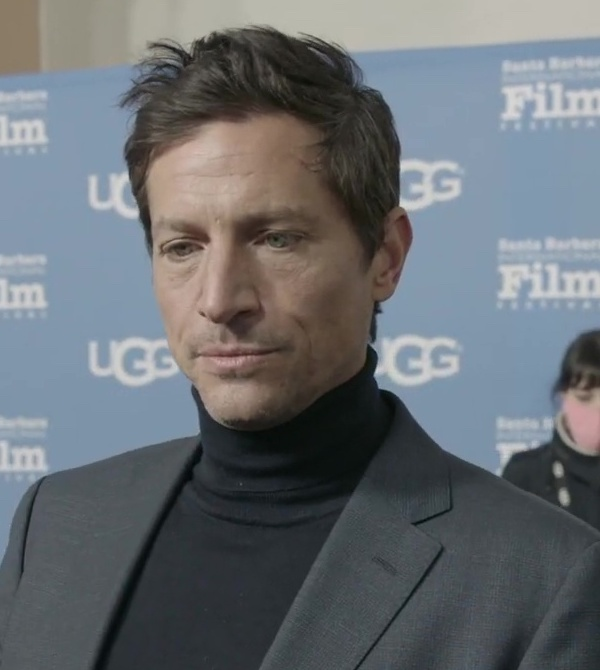
Simon Rex was the final recipient for Red Rocket.

== See also ==
- Academy Award for Best Actor
- Actor Award for Outstanding Performance by a Male Actor in a Leading Role
- Critics' Choice Movie Award for Best Actor
- BAFTA Award for Best Actor in a Leading Role
- Golden Globe Award for Best Actor in a Motion Picture – Drama
- Golden Globe Award for Best Actor in a Motion Picture – Musical or Comedy
- Saturn Award for Best Actor
