= Someone to Watch Award =

Award for filmmakers who have not yet received recognition

The Someone to Watch Award is an emerging filmmaker award presented by Film Independent Spirit Awards that recognizes a talented filmmaker of singular vision who has not yet received appropriate recognition.

== History ==
The award includes a $25,000 unrestricted grant. The award was first given at the 1994 award ceremony.

Notable winners/nominees who would soon become recognized include Kelly Reichardt (Wendy and Lucy), Chris Smith (American Movie), Tim Blake Nelson (The Grey Zone), Marc Forster (Finding Neverland), Andrew Bujalski (Mutual Appreciation), Ramin Bahrani (Fahrenheit 451) & Barry Jenkins (Moonlight)

== Winners ==
=== 1990s ===
- 1994: Lodge Kerrigan – Clean, Shaven
- 1995: Christopher Münch – Color of a Brisk and Leaping Day
  - Tim McCann – Desolation Angels
  - Jennifer Montgomery – Art for Teachers of Children
  - Kelly Reichardt – River of Grass
  - Rafal Zielinski – Fun
- 1996: Larry Fessenden – Habit
  - Joe Brewster – The Keeper
  - Chris Smith – American Job
- 1997: Scott Saunders – The Headhunter's Sister
  - Erin Dignam – Loved
  - Tim Blake Nelson – Eye of God
- 1998: David D. Williams – Thirteen
  - Tony Barbieri – One
  - Lynn Hershman Leeson – Conceiving Ada
  - Eric Tretbar – Snow
- 1999: Cauleen Smith – Drylongso
  - Dan Clark – The Item
  - Julian Goldberger – Trans
  - Lisanne Skyler – Getting to Know You

=== 2000s ===
- 2000: Marc Forster – Everything Put Together
  - Dan McCormack – Other Voices
  - Mia Trachinger – Bunny
- 2001: Debra Eisenstadt – Daydream Believer
  - DeMane Davis and Khari Streeter – Lift
  - Michael Gilio – Kwik Stop
  - David Maquiling – Too Much Sleep
- 2002: Przemyslaw Reut – Paradox Lake
  - Eric Eason – Manito
  - Eitan Gorlin – The Holy Land
- 2003: Andrew Bujalski – Funny Ha Ha
  - Ben Coccio – Zero Day
  - Ryan Eslinger – Madness and Genius
- 2004: Jem Cohen – Chain
  - Bryan Poyser – Dear Pillow
  - Jennifer Reeves – The Time We Killed
- 2005: Ian Gamazon and Neill Dela Llana – Cavite
  - Robinson Devor – Police Beat
  - Jay Duplass – The Puffy Chair
- 2006: Julia Loktev – Day Night Day Night
  - So Yong Kim – In Between Days
  - Richard Wong – Colma: The Musical
- 2007: Ramin Bahrani – Chop Shop
  - Ronald Bronstein – Frownland
  - Lee Isaac Chung – Munyurangabo
- 2008: Lynn Shelton – My Effortless Brilliance
  - Barry Jenkins – Medicine for Melancholy
  - Nina Paley – Sita Sings the Blues
- 2009: Kyle Patrick Alvarez – Easier with Practice
  - Asiel Norton – Redland
  - Tariq Tapa – Zero Bridge

=== 2010s ===
- 2010: Mike Ott – Littlerock
  - Hossein Keshavarz – Dog Sweat
  - Laurel Nakadate – The Wolf Knife
- 2011: Mark Jackson – Without
  - Simon Arthur – Silver Tongues
  - Nicholas Ozeki – Mamitas
- 2012: Adam Leon – Gimme the Loot
  - David Fenster – Pincus
  - Rebecca Thomas – Electrick Children
- 2013: Shaka King – Newlyweeds
  - Madeline Olnek – The Foxy Merkins
  - Aaron Douglas Johnston – My Sister's Quinceañera
- 2014: Rania Attieh and Daniel Garcia – H.
  - Ana Lily Amirpour – A Girl Walks Home Alone at Night
  - Chris Eska – The Retrieval
- 2015: Felix Thompson – King Jack
  - Robert Machoian and Rodrigo Ojeda-Beck – God Bless the Child
  - Chloé Zhao – Songs My Brothers Taught Me
- 2016: Anna Rose Holmer – The Fits
  - Andrew Ahn – Spa Night
  - Claire Carré – Embers
  - Ingrid Jungermann – Women Who Kill
- 2017: Justin Chon — Gook
  - Amman Abbasi — Dayveon
  - Kevin Phillips — Super Dark Times
- 2018: Alexandre Moratto — Sócrates
  - Ioana Uricaru — Lemonade
  - Jeremiah Zagar — We the Animals
- 2019: Rashaad Ernesto Green — Premature
  - Ash Mayfair — The Third Wife
  - Joe Talbot — The Last Black Man in San Francisco

=== 2020s ===
- 2020: Ekwa Msangi – Farewell Amor
  - David Midell – The Killing of Kenneth Chamberlain
  - Annie Silverstein – Bull
- 2021: Alex Camilleri – Luzzu
  - Gillian Wallace Horvat – I Blame Society
  - Michael Sarnoski – Pig
- 2022: Nikyatu Jusu – Nanny
  - Adamma Ebo – Honk for Jesus. Save Your Soul.
  - Araceli Lemos – Holy Emy
- 2023
  - Monica Sorelle – Mountains
  - Joanna Arnow – The Feeling That the Time for Doing Something Has Passed
  - Laura Moss – Birth/Rebirth
- 2024
  - Sarah Friedland - Familiar Touch
  - Nicholas Colia - Griffin in Summer
  - Pham Thien An - Inside the Yellow Cocoon Shell
- 2025
  - Tatti Ribeiro - Valentina
  - Neo Sora - Happyend
  - Annapurna Sriram - Fucktoys
