= Sintonia =

Brazilian drama television series

- Genre: Crime drama; Teen drama
- Created by: KondZilla; Guilherme Quintella; Felipe Braga
- Based on: an original idea by KondZilla
- Written by: Guilherme Quintella; Duda de Almeida; Thays Berbe
- Directed by: KondZilla; Johnny Araújo
- Starring: Christian Malheiros; Jottapê; Bruna Mascarenhas
- Country of origin: Brazil
- Original language: Portuguese
- No. of seasons: 5
- No. of episodes: 32

Production
- Executive producer: Felipe Braga
- Producers: Rita Moraes; Felipe Braga; Alice Braga
- Cinematography: Felipe Hermini; Lito Mendes da Rocha
- Editors: Helena Maura; Rodrigo Menecucci; Estevan Santos
- Running time: 36–55 minutes
- Production company: Losbragas

Original release
- Network: Netflix
- Release: August 9, 2019 – present

Sintonia is a Brazilian crime teen drama television series created and directed by Kondzilla that premiered on Netflix on August 9, 2019.

Narrated from the perspectives of the three characters Doni, Nando, and Rita who grew up together, the series follows the interconnectedness of music, drug trafficking and religion in a peripheral neighborhood of São Paulo.

The series links to the first order of the criminal organization Primeiro Comando da Capital (PCC).

== Cast and characters ==
=== Main ===
- Christian Malheiros as Luiz Fernando "Nando" Silva
- Jottapê as Donizete "Doni" Santana da Costa
- Bruna Mascarenhas as Rita

=== Recurring ===
- MC M10 as Formiga
- Vinícius de Oliveira as Éder
- Rosana Maris as Jussara
- Danielle Olímpia as Cacau
- Julia Yamaguchi as Sheila
- Leilah Moreno as MC Dondoka
- Júlio Silvério as Jaspion
- Jefferson Silvério as Rivaldinho
- Fabrício Araújo as Juninho
- Vanderlei Bernardino as Mr. Chico
- Fernanda Viacava as Sueli
- Felipe Vidal as Stephano
- Martha Meola as Lucrécia
- Cesar Mello as dr Guillermo
- Angela Dippe as Pastora Val
- Sandrao Rzo as Bada
- Paulo Bronks as Torcido
- Victoria Rosetti as Heloisa
- Adrinno Bolshi as Marcao
- Rosa Namaris as Jussara
- Ferrnanda Viacava as Pastora Sueli
- Tomas Carfi as tono
- Bruno Gradiol as Levi

=== Guest ===
- Dani Russo as herself
- MC Kekel as himself
- Ivan Capua as Kiki
- Alex Barone as Allan
- Hugo Leonadardo as Alex

== Episodes ==
=== Series overview ===
Season	Episodes	Originally released
1	6	September 8, 2019
2	6	October 27, 2021
3	6	July 13, 2022
4	8	July 25, 2023

=== Season 1 (2019) ===
No. overall	No. in season	Title	Directed by	Written by	Original release date
1	1	"They Caught Cacau"	KondZilla	Guilherme Quintella & Duda de Almeida	August 9, 2019
Doni nurtures hopes that his musical career will take off, Nando tries to get promoted in a drug dealing operation, and Rita worries about her friend.
2	2	"I Did a Bad Thing"	Johnny Araújo	Duda de Almeida	August 9, 2019
A wounded Rita feels guilty about Cacau. Nando gets in trouble with law enforcement and Doni confronts Dondoka about stealing his music.
3	3	"Second Chance"	Johnny Araújo	Thays Berbe & Guilherme Quintella	August 9, 2019
Doni starts to enjoy his success but his friends urge him to stay grounded. Nando defends a threatened Juninho and Rita sees another side of religion.
4	4	"Do the Right Thing"	Johnny Araújo	Duda de Almeida, Guilherme Quintella & Thays Berbe	August 9, 2019
Doni overcommits himself to too many performances, while Rita plans a fundraiser. Nando fears for his life after a drug delivery seemingly goes awry.
5	5	"Make Your Mark"	KondZilla & Johnny Araújo	Guilherme Quintella & Thays Berbe	August 9, 2019
Badá decides what to do with Nando. Rita has a meaningful religious experience and considers her future. Doni performs to an energized crowd.
6	6	"Moving to the Same Beat"	KondZilla	Guilherme Quintella & Duda de Almeida	August 9, 2019
A grieving Doni takes a risk during his first television appearance. Rita prepares for her baptism. Nando is rewarded within the drug cartel.

=== Season 2 (2021) ===
No. overall	No. in season	Title	Directed by	Written by	Original release date
7	1	"The Family We Chose"	KondZilla & Johnny Araújo	Guilherme Quintella	October 27, 2021
Now a successful MC, Doni hopes to persuade Nando to leave the streets behind by making him a business offer. Guided by her faith, Rita seeks closure.
8	2	"Different Worlds"	KondZilla & Johnny Araújo	Thayná Mantesso, Guilherme Quintella & Denis Nielsen	October 27, 2021
The block party causes controversy in Vila Áurea, prompting Nando and his men to step in. Doni crushes on an influencer. Rita meets the pastor's son.
9	3	"If We Get Together Tonight, It's Gonna Be Lit"	KondZilla & Gabriel Zerra	Guilherme Freitas	October 27, 2021
Doni looks for a killer collaboration. With the local church in need of repairs, Rita and Levi raise funds. Badá pushes Nando to find the snitch.
10	4	"Paying Up"	KondZilla & Daniela Carvalho	Luíza Fazio	October 27, 2021
Doni and MC Luzi try to boost engagement with their video. Levi gets closer to Rita. Luzia tries to hide her financial troubles from everyone.
11	5	"A Thousand May Fall at Your Side"	KondZilla, Johnny Araújo & Thiago Eva	Duda de Almeida	October 27, 2021
Rita feels the pressure to do well while in charge of the new church, where Doni is set to perform. Nando and his men undertake a risky mission.
12	6	"Vigil"	KondZilla, Johnny Araújo & Daniela Carvalho	Denis Nielsen	October 27, 2021
A tragedy at Vila Áurea leaves residents reeling as the crew faces new challenges — some more welcome than others.

=== Season 3 (2022) ===
No. overall	No. in season	Title	Directed by	Written by	Original release date
13	1	"As Life Begins"	Daniela Carvalho	Donna Oliveira & Fernanda Terepins	July 13, 2022
Rita considers running for city council. Nando's family grows. After living his best life performing in Paris, Doni is sent back on a local tour.
14	2	"Alias: Formigão"	Daniela Carvalho	Verônica Honorato & Fernanda Terepins	July 13, 2022
Nando reunites with Badá. Desperate, Rita tries to find Cleyton through Nando, but there's more to his arrest than she knows. Doni works on a new hit.
15	3	"He Who Protects Me Never Sleeps"	Daniela Carvalho	Donna Oliveira & Fernanda Terepins	July 13, 2022
In Paraguay, Nando sets in motion Messinho's risky plan. Doni falls out with his producer over a gig. Rita witnesses Daniel's explosive temper.
16	4	"God and Ideas"	Daniela Carvalho	Donna Oliveira & Fernanda Terepins	July 13, 2022
Doni turns to Nando after an affair lands him in hot water. Rita urges Cleyton to wise up about his situation. The church decides on a candidate.
17	5	"Escape Route"	Daniela Carvalho	Verônica Honorato & Fernanda Terepins	July 13, 2022
Nando brings in a new ally. Doni is embroiled in a copyright claim. As Cleyton's trial begins, Rita starts to feel the campaign's pressures.
18	6	"The Beginning of the End"	Daniela Carvalho	Donna Oliveira & Fernanda Terepins	July 13, 2022
A lonely Doni tries to get back together with Tally. The pastor reveals a surprising side. At the cafe, Scheyla and Nando deal with a serious setback.

=== Season 4 (2023) ===
No. overall	No. in season	Title	Directed by	Written by	Original release date
19	1	"Save My Brother"	Daniela Carvalho	Donna Oliveira & Fernanda Terepins	July 25, 2023
After the raid, Nando is forced to lie low for a while. Doni leaves the hospital and struggles to fully recover. Rita finds a new purpose in life.
20	2	"The Xerox"	Daniela Carvalho	Verônica Honorato & Fernanda Terepins	July 25, 2023
Rita enrolls in Law school, and Nando's plan to get his wife back is set in motion. Doni's comeback to the stage doesn't go as planned.
21	3	"University"	Daniela Carvalho	Fernanda Terepins	July 25, 2023
Scheyla faces the outcome of Nando's frustrated plans. Rita and Heloisa work together on a project. Doni is haunted by his unpaid hospital bills.
22	4	"Female Prison"	Daniela Carvalho	Verônica Honorato & Fernanda Terepins	July 25, 2023
After visiting Scheyla in prison, Rita gets a life-changing proposal. Nando tries to learn who's behind the raid, and Doni finds a way to pay his bills.
23	5	"The Final Ideas"	Daniela Carvalho	Donna Oliveira & Fernanda Terepins	July 25, 2023
Doni moves back to Vila Áurea and reconnects with Nando, who makes a dangerous — but crucial — life decision. William gives Rita some candid feedback.
24	6	"Crazy Dog"	Daniela Carvalho	Verônica Honorato & Fernanda Terepins	July 25, 2023
While Cleyton struggles as a delivery driver, Doni finds a new career path after a rap battle. Rita, Laura and the kids visit Scheyla on Mother's Day.
25	7	"Sewing"	Daniela Carvalho	Donna Oliveira & Fernanda Terepins	July 25, 2023
A high-risk plan to get Scheyla out of prison may cost Nando — and Rita — everything. Doni looks out for fresh new hip-hop talent for VA Records.
26	8	"The Surrender"	Daniela Carvalho	Verônica Honorato & Fernanda Terepins	July 25, 2023
Rita and Nando open up after the attempted prison break. Old friends and loved ones reconcile, and sacrifices are made.

== Production ==
=== Conception and development ===
The producer company Losbragas, who had already produced the comedy series Samantha! for Netflix, learned of Kondzilla's idea of making a short film about three young teenagers from the favela who wanted to buy expensive sneakers. After negotiations, the idea of the short film turned to a project of a series and the characters gained different goals and a more complex storyline.

== Marketing ==
On June 17, 2019, the teaser trailer for the series was released. The first full trailer was released by Netflix on July 11, 2019.

The red carpet premiere of Sintonia took place on July 30, 2019, at the Cinemateca Brasileira in São Paulo, where the first two episodes were previewed.

For the first time in an original production, Netflix released the first episode of Sintonia on YouTube as a promotion for the series. The episode became available from August 9, until August 11, 2019, at KondZilla's YouTube channel.

== Soundtrack ==
The music for the series was composed by Tropkillaz's electronic music duo of DJs Zegon and Lauds. The series also features original songs for the character MC Doni (performed by Jottapê) and produced by MC EZ. The soundtrack album was released to music streaming services such as Spotify, on August 17, 2019.

== Reception ==
Joel Keller from Decider described Sintonia as a "fascinating look at life in São Paulo's favelas, where people are creative and hopeful, despite difficult circumstances."
