= Christian Malheiros =

Brazilian actor

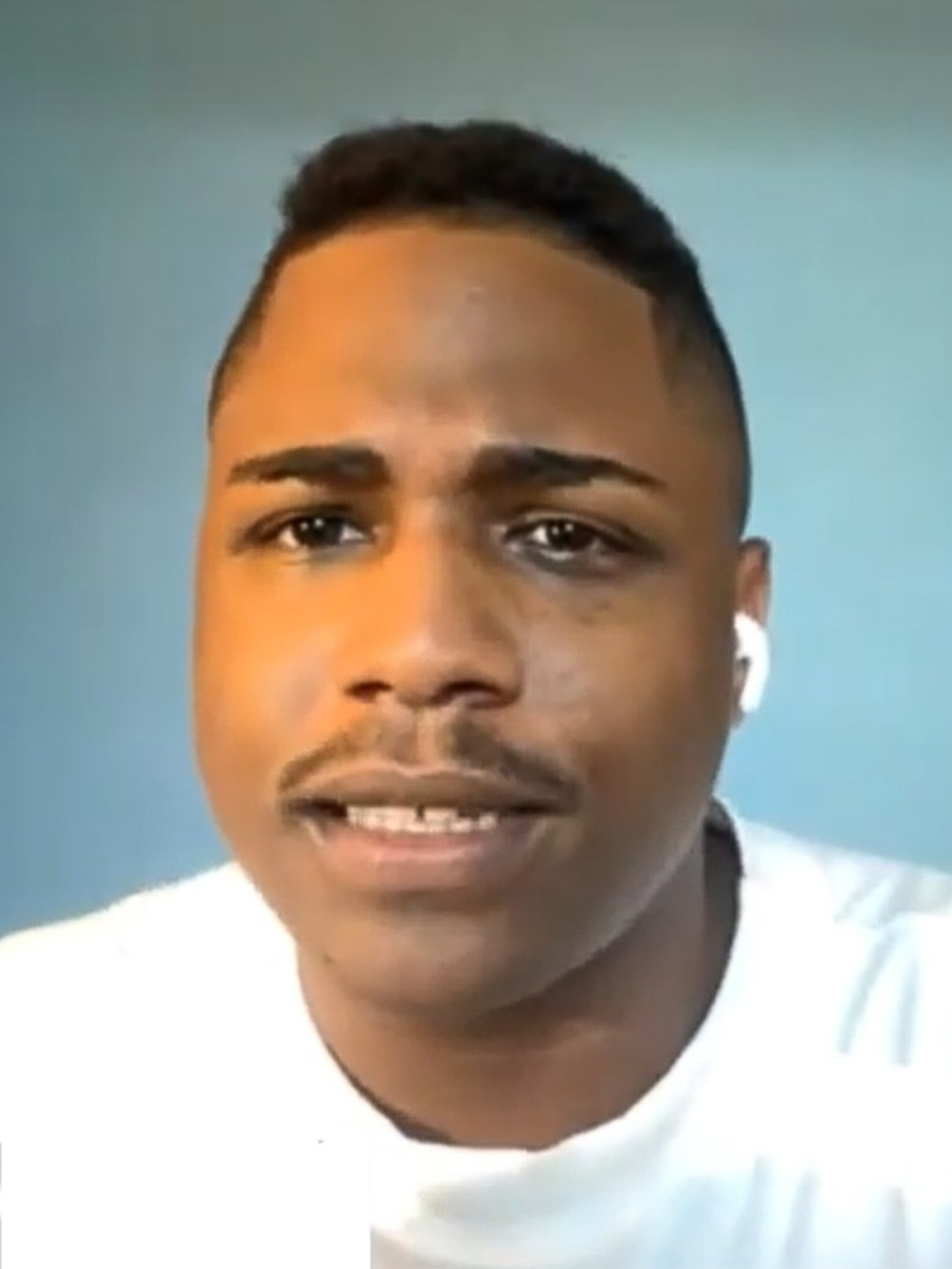
- Malheiros in 2023.
- Born: 14 August 1999 (age 26); Santos, São Paulo, Brazil
- Occupation: Actor
- Years active: 2009–present

Christian Malheiros (born 14 August 1999) is a Brazilian actor. He is known for his award-winning performance in the 2018 drama film Sócrates, which was praised by critics and earned him a nomination for Best Male Lead at the 34th Independent Spirit Awards.

== Career ==
Malheiros started his career in theater at nine years old.

He made his feature film debut as a teenager in the 2018 drama film Sócrates, for which he was nominated for Best Male Lead at the 34th Independent Spirit Awards. The film traces the story of Sócrates, a black 15-year-old teenager from Santos, in the coast of São Paulo, as he has to overcome extreme poverty, the death of his mother, and homophobia. The film received critical acclaim after being released on the international film festival circuit. It was shortlisted for Brazil's official entry for the Academy Award for Best International Feature.

Critics praised his performance in Sócrates. Writing for The Hollywood Reporter, critic Frank Scheck called his performance "stunning." In Variety, critic Dennis Harvey wrote "Malheiros’ terrific turn makes this protagonist credibly tough by necessity, and mature beyond his years." In The Los Angeles Times wrote that Malheiros' "facial gestures oscillate between stoicism and crushing wails." The New York Times wrote that "his charm and energy draw us immediately to his side."

In 2019, Malheiros began starring as Nando in the Brazilian crime teen drama streaming television series Sintonia, created and directed by Kondzilla, which premiered on Netflix on August 9, 2019. The series received positive reviews. In 2020, invited by Luiz Päetow, he starred as Angel in the Brazilian film Transmission, which premiered on September 20, 2020.

== Filmography ==
=== Film ===
Year	Title	Role	Notes
2015	Limbo	Lucas	Short film
2018	Sócrates	Sócrates	
2021	7 Prisoners	Mateus	
2023	A Última Festa	Nathan	
2024	Biônicos	Gustavo "Gus" Silva	
TBA	O Combinado Não Sai Caro	TBA	
TBA	Maníaco do Parque	Beto	
TBA	O Velho Fusca	Jeff	
TBA	Ninguém Sai Vivo Daqui	Eduardo	

=== Television ===
Ano	Título	Papel	Notas
2019–2025	Sintonia	Luiz Fernando "Nando" Silva	
2021	Sessão de Terapia	Antônio "Tony" Carrara	
2021	Os Ausentes	Thomas Rodrigues	
2021	Colônia	Eduardo de Almeida	Episode: "O Hospital Colônia"
2024	Ponto Final	Jonathan "Jota"	Episode: "Tô no Ponto"
2024	Senna	Maurinho	
TBA	Aqueles Dias	Baby de Andrade	

== Stage ==
Year	Title	Role
2018	Fedra	
2018	7 Leituras, 7 Autores, 7 Diretores	
2018	ÈGBÉ	
2019	O Amor às Avessas	

== Awards and nominations ==
Year	Award	Category	Work	Result	Ref
2019	34th Independent Spirit Awards	Best Male Lead	Sócrates	Nominated	
2018	International Filmfestival Mannheim-Heidelberg	Best Actor	Sócrates	Won	
2018	Festival MixBrasil de Cultura da Diversidade	Best Actor	Sócrates	Won	
