= Socrates (2018 film) =

- Promotional release poster
- Directed by: Alexandre Moratto
- Screenplay by: Thayná Mantesso; Alexandre Moratto
- Produced by: Tammy Weiss; Alexandre Moratto; Ramin Bahrani; Jefferson Paulino; Fernando Meirelles
- Starring: Christian Malheiros; Tales Ordakji; Caio Martinez Pacheco
- Cinematography: João Gabriel de Queiroz
- Edited by: Alexandre Moratto
- Music by: Tiago Abrahão & Felipe Puperi
- Production company: O2 Films
- Distributed by: Breaking Glass Pictures
- Release date: 21 September 2018 (Los Angeles)
- Running time: 71 minutes
- Country: Brazil
- Language: Portuguese
- Budget: $20,000

Socrates (Portuguese: Sócrates) is a 2018 Brazilian drama film directed by Alexandre Moratto and starring Christian Malheiros—both in their feature film debuts. The film traces the story of Sócrates, a black 15-year-old teenager from Santos, in the coast of São Paulo, as he has to overcome extreme poverty, the death of his mother, and homophobia.

The film received critical acclaim after being released on the international film festival circuit. It was shortlisted for Brazil's official entry for the Academy Award for Best International Feature. It was also nominated for Best Male Lead (Malheiros), the John Cassavetes Award (best film with a budget under $500,000), and the Someone to Watch Award (Moratto) at the 2019 Independent Spirit Awards, winning in the latter for Moratto. In March 2019, it won the prestigious Jordan Ressler First Feature Award at the Miami Film Festival.

== Plot ==
"After his mother's sudden death, Sócrates, a 15-year-old living on the margins of São Paulo's coast, must survive on his own while coming to terms with his grief," dire economic situation, family strife, homophobia, abuse, lust, and love.

== Production ==
The film was executive produced by Fernando Meirelles, the Academy Award-nominated director of City of God, who called it "a great and sensitive debut film. A mirror to the youth in Brazil and all over the world." It was produced by acclaimed filmmaker and Columbia University associate film professor Ramin Bahrani, who Moratto counts as a mentor. The film was "the first feature produced by the Querô Institute in Brazil where it was co-written, produced, and acted by at-risk teenagers from local low-income communities, with the support of UNICEF."

Produced on a budget of $20,000, the film relied on young theater actors giving naturalistic performances.

Moratto has spoken openly about the film's personal themes, which came from his experiences as a volunteer at the Querô Institute in Brazil when he was 19-years-old, as well as his mother's death when he was 25-years-old. He has stated that "every door that slams in Socrates’ face is a door that, at that time in my life, I felt slam on mine," even though he also states that Socrates' socio-economic background is "a very different world" from his own. Speaking to these themes, he has stated that the greatest tragedy in the world is not just hunger and poverty, but also a lack of love, and that he hopes that film can create more empathy for people like Socrates.

== Cast ==
- Christian Malheiros as Sócrates
- Tales Ordakji as Maicon, Sócrates's friend and lover
- Caio Martinez Pacheco as Chicão, Sócrates's cousin
- Rosane Paulo as Dona, Sócrates's landlady
- Jayme Rodrigues as Robson, Sócrates's father
- Vanessa Santana as Social Worker

== Release ==
The film premiered on September 21, 2018, at the LA Film Festival, before screening at over a fifty film festivals worldwide, including the Miami International Film Festival and the Mannheim-Heidelberg International Film Festival.

It was released theatrically and on PVOD in the United States by Breaking Glass Pictures in August 2019, as well as theatrically in Brazil in September 2019 by O2 Play, and theatrically in the UK by Peccadillo Pictures in September 2020.

=== Critical response ===
As of October 2021, the film has an approval rating of 90% based on reviews from 29 critics on Rotten Tomatoes. The site's critical consensus reads, "Brought brilliantly to life by Christian Malheiros' soulful performance, Socrates uses one boy's story to check a nation's pulse." As of November 2020, the film received a score of 82 out of 100 on Metacritic based on 10 reviews, indicating "universal acclaim" and placing it in the site's top 50 best films of 2019.

The New York Times selected it as a Critic's Pick, where it was reviewed by Jeannette Catsoulis, who wrote, "'Socrates' isn’t simply about being gay, or poor, or even devastatingly unloved: It’s about honoring a resilience that most of us will thankfully never have to summon." A Los Angeles Times review by Carlos Aguilar called the film an "affecting and necessary debut." In a four star review on RogerEbert.com, critic Godfrey Cheshire called the film "a work whose accomplishments signal a director of great promise." Writing for Film Threat, critic Alex Saveliev noted that the film has "an authenticity rarely seen in contemporary cinema." In a five star review for O Estado de São Paulo, influential Brazilian critic Luiz Carlos Merten said that Socrates should have been Brazil's official entry for the Academy Award for Best International Feature, citing its themes and its nominations at the Independent Spirit Awards, which he referred to as the "Independent Oscar."

Critics also focused on Christian Malheiros' award-winning performance. Writing for The Hollywood Reporter, critic Frank Scheck called his performance "stunning." In Variety, critic Dennis Harvey wrote "Malheiros’ terrific turn makes this protagonist credibly tough by necessity, and mature beyond his years." In The Los Angeles Times wrote that Malheiros' "facial gestures oscillate between stoicism and crushing wails." The New York Times wrote that "his charm and energy draw us immediately to his side."

=== Accolades ===
The film was shortlisted for Brazil's official entry for the Academy Award for Best International Feature. It was also nominated for Best Male Lead (Malheiros), the John Cassavetes Award (best film with a budget under $500,000), and the Someone to Watch Award (Moratto) at the 2019 Independent Spirit Awards, winning in the latter for Moratto. In March 2019, it won the prestigious Jordan Ressler First Feature Award at the Miami International Film Festival.

Malheiros won the Special Jury Award at the 67th Mannheim-Heidelberg International Film Festival, one of the longest-running film festivals in Europe. Of his performance, the festival noted:

"A jury watches a lot of films. If one thing sticks with you that you don’t forget, it is often a face. In this case it is the face of Christian Malheiros in the Brazilian Film 'Socrates'. The worry, the happiness and the hope in this face – and his fight in the big city jungle of São Paulo – will not soon be forgotten by those who see it. That is why this year’s Special Jury Award goes to the actor Christian Malheiros in the film 'Socrates'."
