= 18th Independent Spirit Awards =

Independent filmmaking awards for 2002

- Date: March 22, 2003
- Site: Santa Monica, California, U.S.
- Hosted by: John Waters

Highlights
- Best Film: Far from Heaven
- Most awards: Far from Heaven (5)
- Most nominations: Lovely & Amazing (6)

The 18th Independent Spirit Awards, honoring the best in independent filmmaking for 2002, were presented on March 22, 2003. It was hosted by John Waters. The nominations were announced on December 12, 2002.

Additionally, this ceremony is notable for when presenter Brittany Murphy seemingly bungled the reading of the winner for Best Debut Performance. In reference to her acting ability, legendary film critic Roger Ebert wrote:

As for Brittany Murphy, for me, it goes back to the 2003 Independent Spirit Awards [where] Murphy was assigned to present one of the awards. Her task was to read the names of the five nominees, open an envelope, and reveal the name of the winner. This she turned into an opportunity for screwball improvisational comedy, by pretending she could not follow this sequence, not even after the audience shouted instructions and the stage manager came to whisper in her ear not once but twice. There were those in the audience who were dumbfounded by her stupidity. I was dumbfounded by her brilliance.

Suspiciously, video footage of the entire ceremony is absent from online resources despite prior and subsequent ceremonies being made available in their entirety officially on Film Independent's YouTube account. However, footage of Murphy's alleged act was used for the 2021 HBO Max documentary titled What Happened, Brittany Murphy?.

== Winners and nominees ==
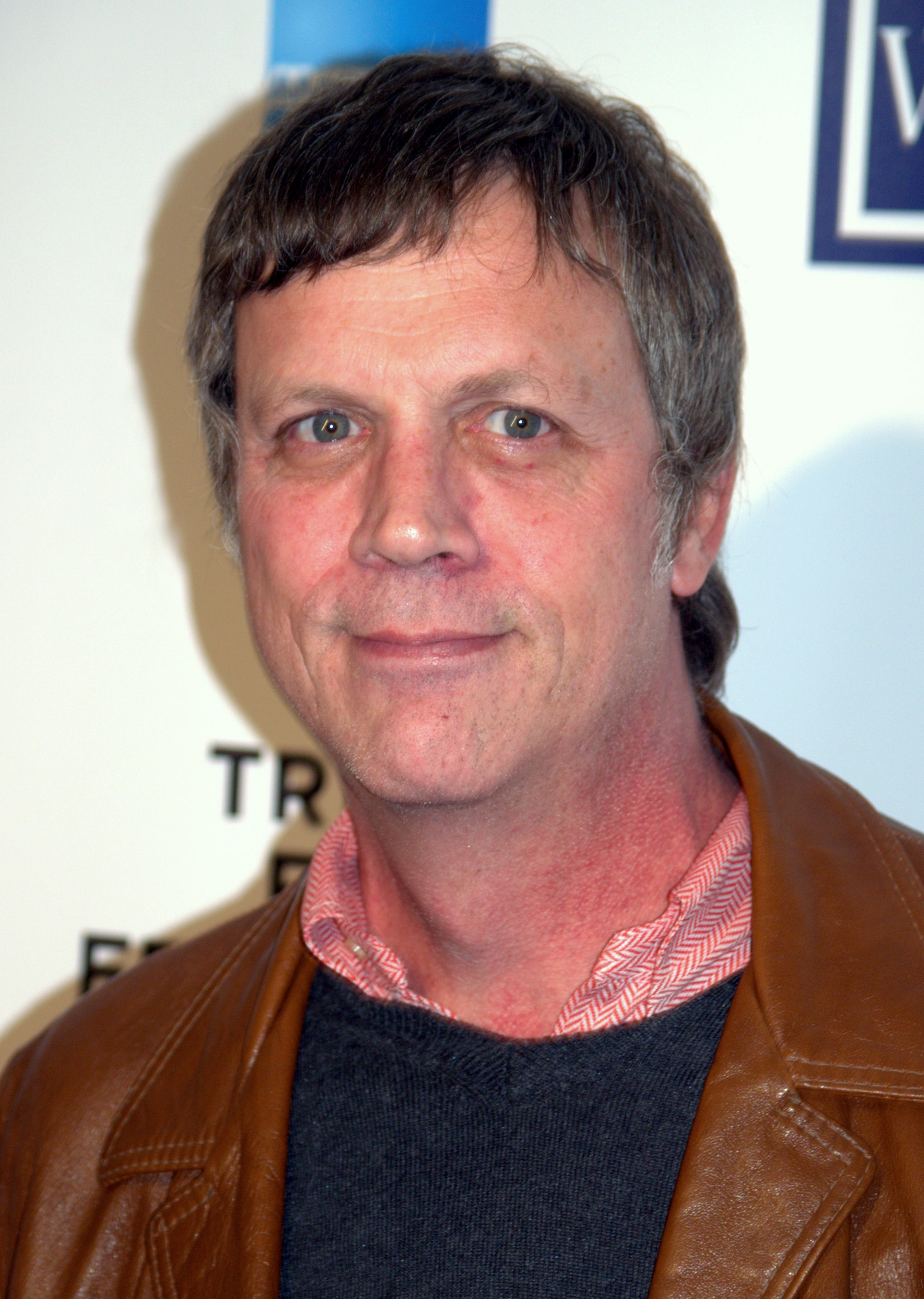
Todd Haynes, Best Director winner

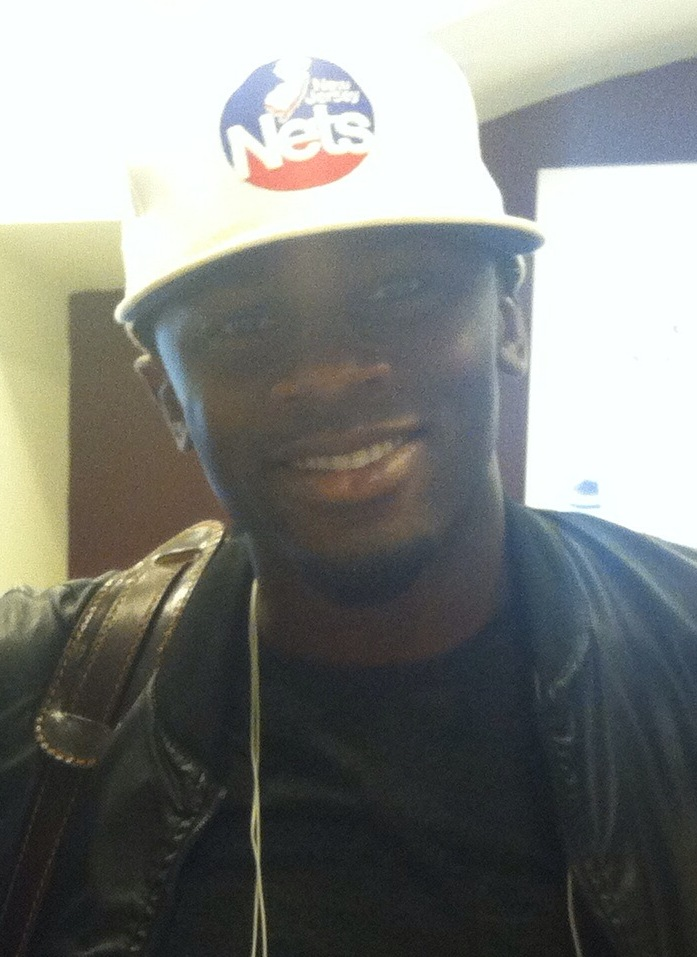
Derek Luke, Best Male Lead winner

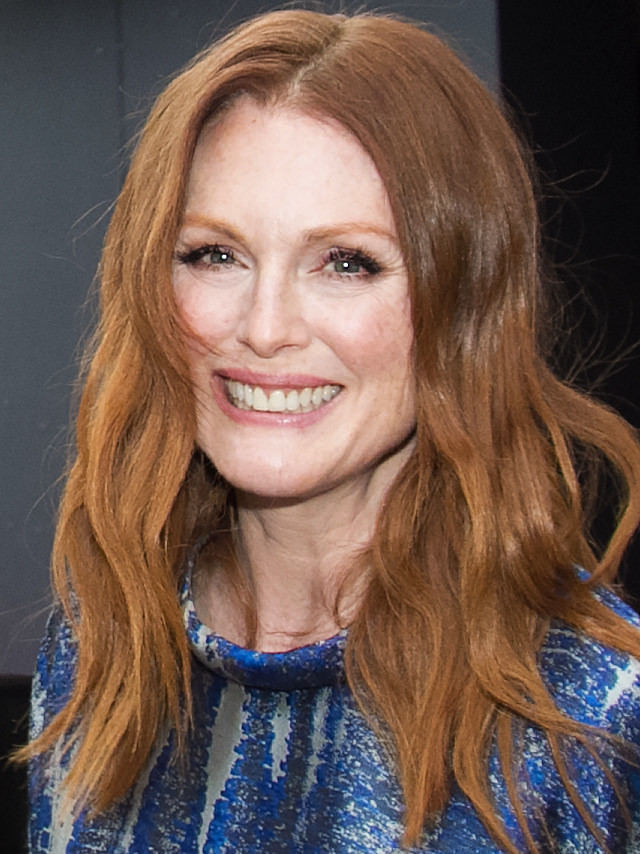
Julianne Moore, Best Female Lead winner

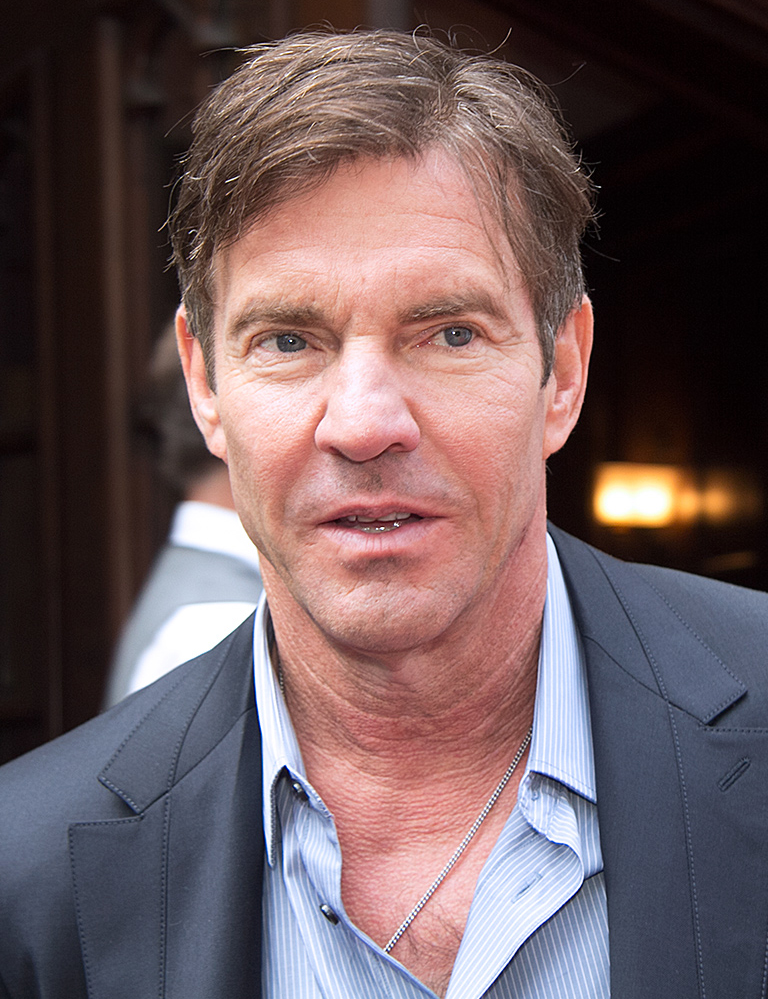
Dennis Quaid, Best Supporting Male winner

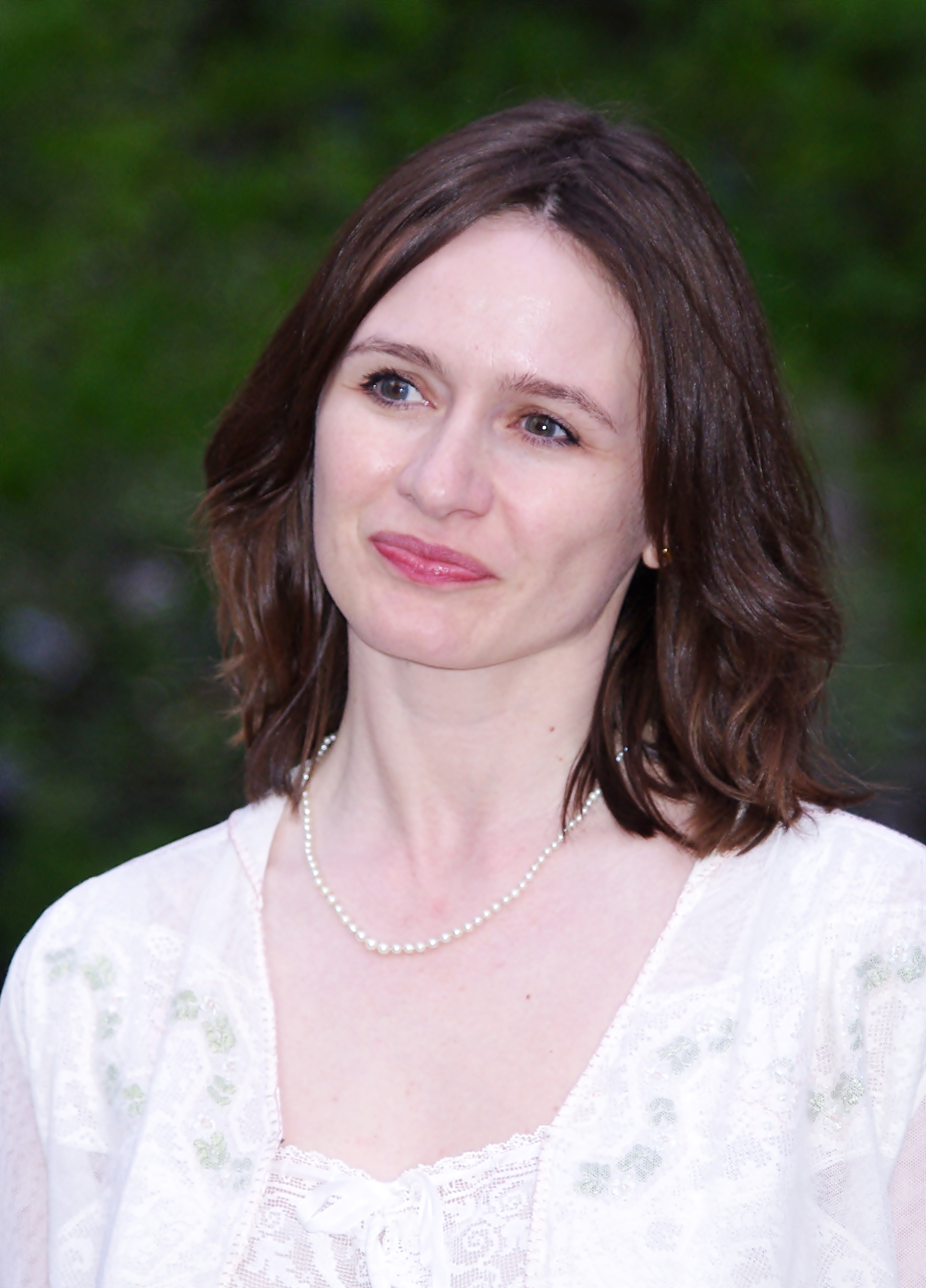
Emily Mortimer, Best Supporting Female winner

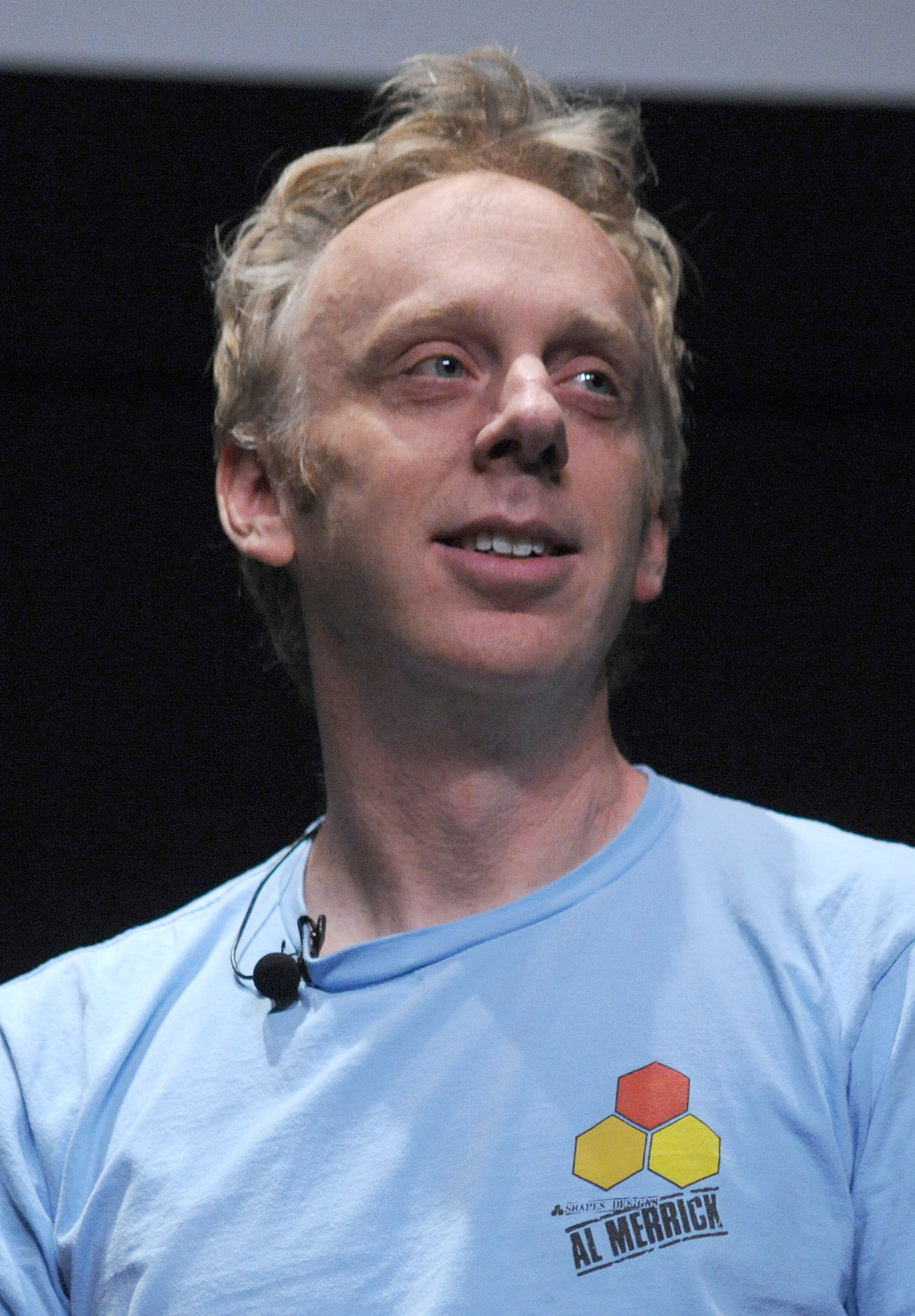
Mike White, Best Screenplay winner

Best Feature	Best Director
Far from Heaven: The Good Girl; Lovely & Amazing; Secretary; Tully	Todd Haynes – Far from Heaven: Joe Carnahan – Narc; Nicole Holofcener – Lovely & Amazing; Bernard Rose – Ivans Xtc; Gus Van Sant – Gerry
Best Male Lead	Best Female Lead
Derek Luke – Antwone Fisher: Graham Greene – Skins; Danny Huston – Ivans Xtc; Jeremy Renner – Dahmer; Campbell Scott – Roger Dodger	Julianne Moore – Far from Heaven: Jennifer Aniston – The Good Girl; Maggie Gyllenhaal – Secretary; Catherine Keener – Lovely & Amazing; Parker Posey – Personal Velocity: Three Portraits
Best Supporting Male	Best Supporting Female
Dennis Quaid – Far from Heaven: Alan Arkin – Thirteen Conversations About One Thing; Ray Liotta – Narc; John C. Reilly – The Good Girl; Peter Weller – Ivans Xtc	Emily Mortimer – Lovely & Amazing: Viola Davis – Antwone Fisher; Jacqueline Kim – Charlotte Sometimes; Juliette Lewis – Hysterical Blindness; Julianne Nicholson – Tully
Best Screenplay	Best First Screenplay
The Good Girl – Mike White: Lovely & Amazing – Nicole Holofcener; Roger Dodger – Dylan Kidd; Thirteen Conversations About One Thing – Jill Sprecher and Karen Sprecher; Tully – Hilary Birmingham and Matt Drake	Secretary – Erin Cressida Wilson: Hysterical Blindness – Laura Cahill; Igby Goes Down – Burr Steers; Interview with the Assassin – Neil Burger; Kissing Jessica Stein – Heather Juergensen and Jennifer Westfeldt
Best First Feature	Best Debut Performance
The Dangerous Lives of Altar Boys: Interview with the Assassin; Manito; Paid in Full; Roger Dodger	Nia Vardalos – My Big Fat Greek Wedding: Bob Burrus – Tully; America Ferrera – Real Women Have Curves; Raven Goodwin – Lovely & Amazing; Artel Great – Dahmer
Best Cinematography	Best Documentary Feature
Far from Heaven – Edward Lachman: Gerry – Harris Savides; Interview with the Assassin – Richard Rutkowski; Narc – Alex Nepomniaschy; Personal Velocity: Three Portraits – Ellen Kuras	Bowling for Columbine: The Cockettes; Devil's Playground; How to Draw a Bunny; Scratch
Best Foreign Film
Y tu mamá también • Mexico: Atanarjuat: The Fast Runner • Canada; Bloody Sunday • Ireland / UK; The Piano Teacher • France; Time Out • France

== Special awards ==
=== John Cassavetes Award ===
Personal Velocity: Three Portraits

- Charlotte Sometimes
- Dahmer
- Ivans Xtc
- The Slaughter Rule

=== Truer Than Fiction Award ===
Jennifer Dworkin – Love & Diane

- Jeffrey Blitz – Spellbound
- Eugene Jarecki – The Trials of Henry Kissinger
- Mark Moskowitz – Stone Reader

=== Producers Award ===
Effie Brown – Real Women Have Curves and Stranger Inside

- Allen Bain and Jesse Scolaro – Cry Funny Happy and Manito
- Eden Wurmfeld – Fanci's Persuasion and Kissing Jessica Stein

=== Someone to Watch Award ===
Przemysław Reut – Paradox Lake

- Eric Eason – Manito
- Eitan Gorlin – The Holy Land

== Films with multiple wins and nominations ==
=== Films that received multiple nominations ===
Nominations	Film
6	Lovely and Amazing
5	Far from Heaven
4	The Good Girl
4	Ivans Xtc
4	Tully
3	Dahmer
3	Interview with the Assassin
3	Manito
3	Narc
3	Personal Velocity: Three Portraits
3	Roger Dodger
3	Secretary
2	Antwone Fisher
2	Charlotte Sometimes
2	Gerry
2	Hysterical Blindness
2	Kissing Jessica Stein
2	Real Women Have Curves
2	Thirteen Conversations About One Thing

=== Films that won multiple awards ===
Nominations	Film
5	Far from Heaven
