= Wesley Morris =

American journalist (born 1975)

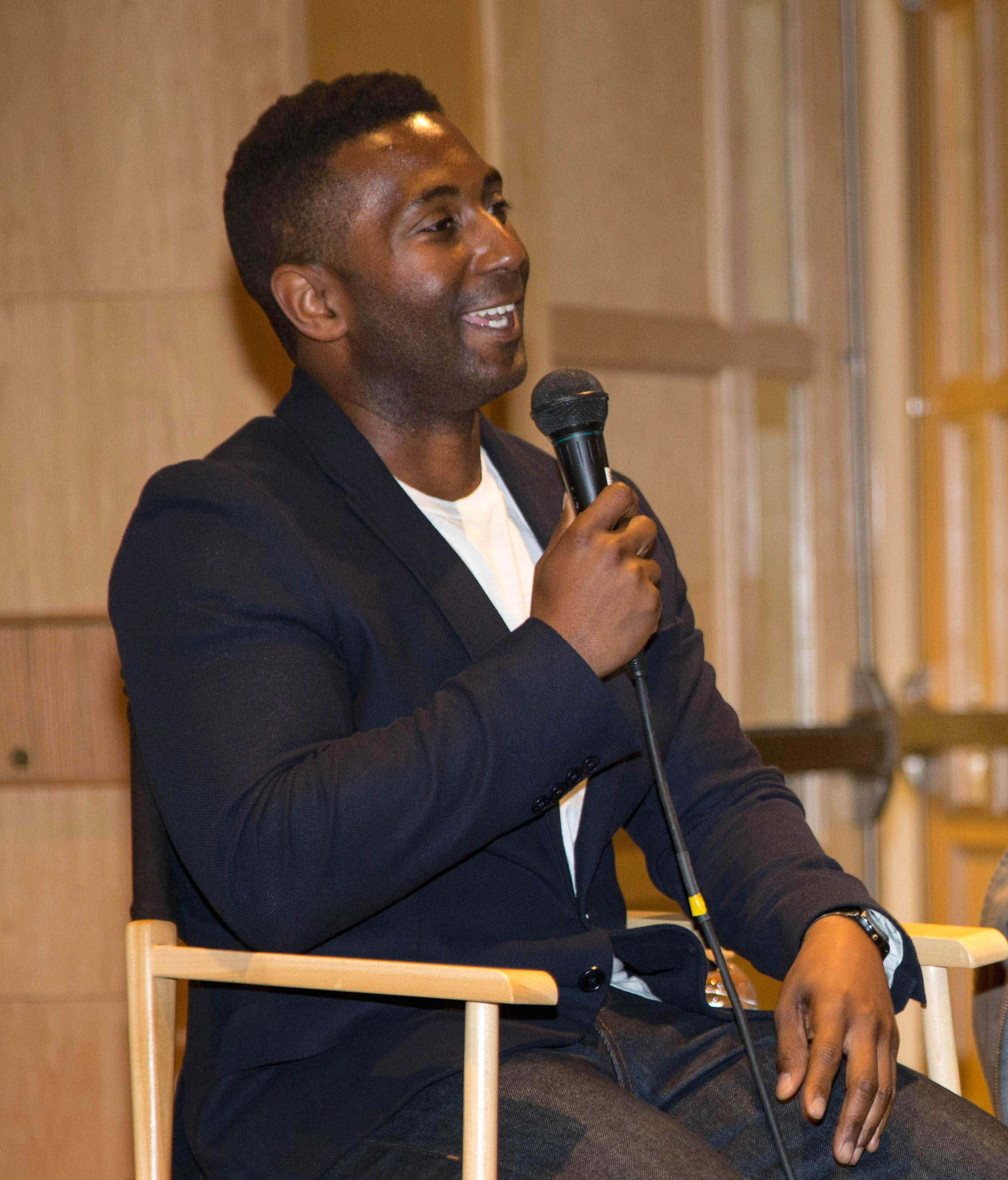
- Morris in 2013
- Born: December 19, 1975 (age 50); Philadelphia, Pennsylvania, U.S.
- Education: Yale University (BA)
- Occupations: Film critic; writer
- Years active: 1993–present
- Employer: The New York Times
- Awards: Pulitzer Prize for Criticism (2012 and 2021)

Wesley Morris (born December 19, 1975) is an American film critic and podcast host. He is currently critic at large for The New York Times and host of the New York Times podcast Cannonball. He was formerly co-host, with J Wortham, of the New York Times podcast Still Processing. Previously, Morris wrote for The Boston Globe, then Grantland. He won the 2012 Pulitzer Prize for Criticism for his work with The Globe and the 2021 Pulitzer Prize for Criticism for his New York Times coverage of race relations in the United States, making Morris one of two writers to have won the Criticism prize more than once.

== Early life ==
Morris was born and raised in Philadelphia. He attended high school at Girard College, graduating in 1993. While a high school student, he wrote for the Philadelphia Inquirer's teen supplement, "Yo! Fresh Ink." In 1997 he graduated from Yale University, where he had been a film critic at The Yale Daily News for four years.

== Career ==
In 1999, while a critic for the San Francisco Examiner, he was one of many film critics who temporarily co-reviewed films with Roger Ebert on his television program in place of Gene Siskel, who was ultimately replaced by Richard Roeper.

Morris joined The Boston Globe in 2002, where he reviewed films alongside Ty Burr. Morris and Burr also made regular appearances on NECN to discuss the latest films and did a weekly Take Two film review video series on Boston.com.

Before joining the Globe, he wrote film reviews and essays for the San Francisco Examiner and the San Francisco Chronicle. He was featured in the 2009 documentary film For the Love of Movies: The Story of American Film Criticism discussing the impact of video store shopping on the importance of film criticism, and how critic Harry Knowles started a questionable revolution of amateurs writing film criticism.

From 2013 to 2015, Morris wrote for ESPN's website Grantland.

In October 2015, Morris joined The New York Times as critic at large, contributing to the newspaper as well as The New York Times Magazine.

In September 2016, Morris and Times colleague J Wortham began hosting a podcast called Still Processing, produced by The New York Times and podcasting company Pineapple Street Media. The podcast received enthusiastic reviews and was named in several year-end lists of the best podcasts of 2016.

Morris served as the guest editor for the 2024 edition of The Best American Essays anthology.

In June 2025, Morris launched Cannonball, a new podcast from The New York Times. The weekly interview show aims to cover culture "in the broadest possible sense," according to Morris.

== Preferences ==
=== Favorite films ===
Morris participated in the 2022 Sight & Sound critics' poll, where he listed his ten favorite films as follows:

- Au hasard Balthazar (France, 1966)
- Beau Travail (France, 1999)
- Do the Right Thing (USA, 1989)
- Metropolis (Germany, 1927)
- Moonlight (USA, 2016)
- Naked (UK, 1993)
- O.J.: Made in America (USA, 2016)
- Taxi Driver (USA, 1976)
- There Will Be Blood (USA, 2007)
- Yi Yi (Taiwan, 1999)

In his video podcast, Cannonball with Wesley Morris, he listed his top 10 films of the 21st century as follows:

- Norte, the End of History (Philippines, 2013)
- Mad Max: Fury Road (Australia, 2015)
- The Piano Teacher (France, 2001)
- O.J.: Made in America (USA, 2016)
- Wall-E (USA, 2008)
- Moonlight (USA, 2016)
- The Holy Girl (Spain, 2004)
- Inherent Vice (USA, 2014)
- Love & Diane (USA, 2002)
- Magic Mike XXL (USA, 2015)

== Awards ==
In 2011, Morris won the Pulitzer Prize for Criticism for his work at The Boston Globe; the award cited "his smart, inventive film criticism, distinguished by pinpoint prose and an easy traverse between the art house and the big-screen box office."

In 2015, Morris was a finalist for the National Magazine Award for Columns and Commentary for his 2014 Grantland columns, "Let's Be Real," "After Normal," and "If U Seek Amy."

In 2021, Morris won his second Pulitzer Prize for Criticism for a series of essays in The New York Times; the Pulitzer citation praised Morris for “unrelentingly relevant and deeply engaged criticism on the intersection of race and culture in America, written in singular style, alternatively playful and profound."

== Personal life ==
Morris lives in Brooklyn, New York. Morris is gay.
