= Franky G =

American film and television actor (born 1965)

- Born: Frank Gonzales; October 30, 1965 (age 60); Brooklyn, New York, U.S.
- Occupation: Actor
- Years active: 1998–present

Franky G (born Frank Gonzales; October 30, 1965) is an American film and television actor. He is perhaps best known for his portrayal of Xavier in Saw II and Wrench in the 2003 remake of The Italian Job as well as other various roles such as Lupus in Confidence and Detective Cruz in Wonderland.

== Early life and career ==
Gonzalez's parents moved from Puerto Rico to Williamsburg, Brooklyn, New York City. Gonzalez was born in Williamsburg and later moved to Flushing, Queens. Before acting, he played semi-professional football, worked as a bouncer and security guard in New York clubs. He studied criminal law in college. Gonzalez replied to an ad for Manito (then called Cruel World) in Backstage magazine; three weeks later he was called to read the script for director Eric Eason. The film played in 50 festivals in 2002. The following year he was cast at the last minute for the role of Wrench in The Italian Job. In 2005, he played Jonny Calvo in the short-lived Fox Network television show Jonny Zero and played Xavier in the horror film Saw II.

In February 2023, he was cast in a television series, Demonico.

== Filmography ==
List of films and roles
Year	Title	Role	Notes
2002	Manito	Junior Moreno	
2003	Confidence	Lupus	
2003	The Italian Job	'Wrench'	
2003	Wonderland	Detective Louis Cruz	
2005	Saw II	Xavier	
2006	Saw III	Xavier	Corpse
2009	The Devil's Tomb	'Hammer'	Direct-to-video
2011	Gun Hill Road	Tico	
2013	Dead Man Down	Luco	
2013	Tio Papi	Chizzy	
2013	36 Saints	Joseph Reyes	Also associate producer
2015	Laugh Killer Laugh	Detective Mantiga	
2016	The Pastor	Luca Ramirez	
2016	Blowtorch	Detective Ramos	
2017	Lost Cat Corona	Ricky	
2018	The Martyr Maker	Asir Iirhabi	
2018	Fists of Love	John	Also executive producer
2021	The Birthday Cake	Omar	

List of television appearances and roles
Year	Title	Role	Notes
1998	New York Undercover	Manuel	Episode: "Quid Pro Quo"
2005	Jonny Zero	Jonny Calvo	13 episodes (4 unaired)
2006– 2007	Smith	Joe	7 episodes
2011	CSI: Miami	Dante Kroll	Episode: "Caged"
2011	Pale Blue Light	Nestor	also executive producer
2013	Blue Bloods	Sergeant Russell	Episode: "Warriors"
2014	Unforgettable	Ricky Cordero	Episode: "Manhunt"
2014–2019	Power	Poncho	20 episodes
2015	The Mysteries of Laura	Lyle Truco	Episode "The Mystery of the Taken Boy"
2016	Luke Cage	Juan Carlos Castro	Episode: "DWYCK"
2017	Law & Order: Special Victims Unit	José Marquez	Episode: "No Surrender" (credited as Frankie G)
2018	Quantico	Dolfo Raza	Episode: "Hell's Gate"
2020	For Life	Rafi Figueroa	Episode: "Witness"
2019–2025	The Family Business	Juan Rodriguez	
2022	Crash the System	Abeto	Episode: All Systems Crashed"; Episode: "Last Rites"
