= Dan Mirvish =

American filmmaker and author

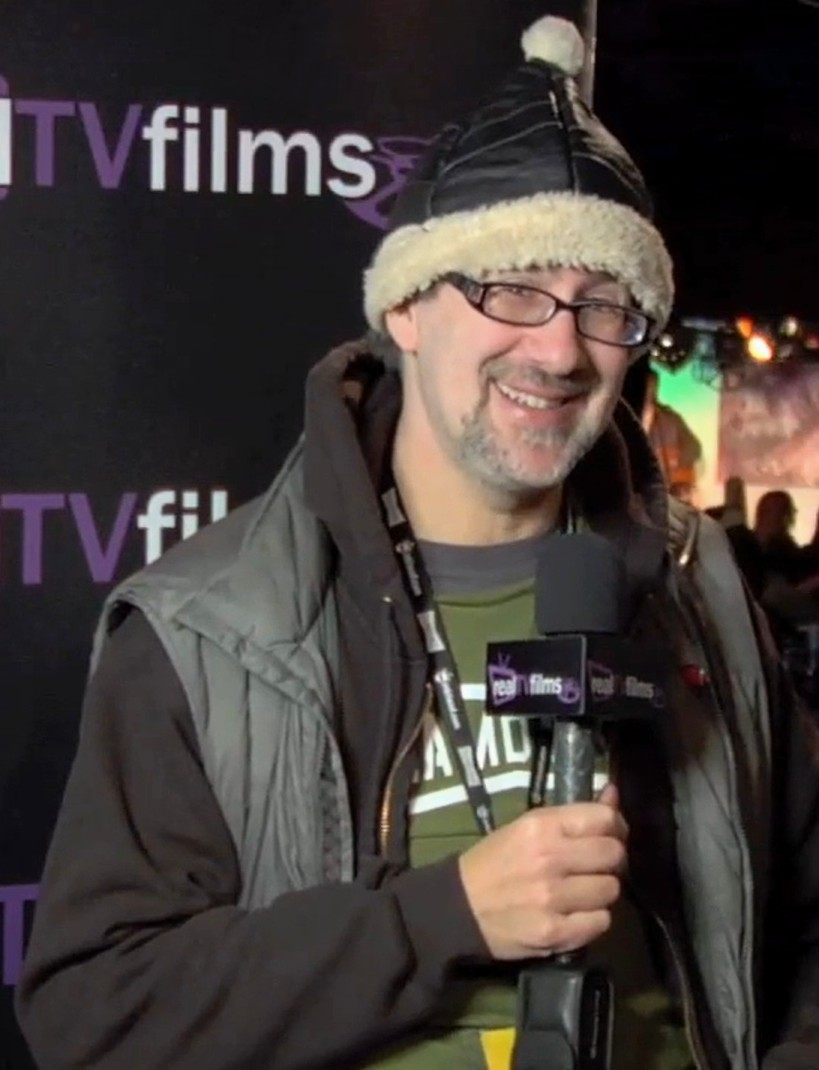
- Mirvish in 2013
- Born: Madison, Wisconsin, United States
- Other name: Martin Eisenstadt
- Education: Washington University in St. Louis; University of Southern California
- Occupations: Filmmaker, author
- Known for: Slamdance Film Festival, Eisenstadt hoax
- Website: www.danmirvish.com

Dan Mirvish is an American filmmaker and author, best known as the co-founder of the Slamdance Film Festival and co-creator of the Martin Eisenstadt hoax during the 2008 Presidential election.

== Early life and education ==
Mirvish was born to a Jewish family in Omaha, the son of Lynda and Sidney Mirvish. His father was a cancer researcher at the University of Nebraska Medical Center. His mother was a publicist and public relations executive. In 1985, Mirvish graduated from Omaha Central High School. He graduated Phi Beta Kappa from Washington University in St. Louis. After school, he worked as a freelance journalist and as a speechwriter for Tom Harkin, U.S. Senator from Iowa before taking a sabbatical to travel around the world. He then returned to California to complete his education in film at the University of Southern California film school.

== Career ==
In 1994, while still in school, he released his first feature film entitled Omaha (The Movie) as his master’s thesis for and then founded the Slamdance Film Festival in Park City, Utah after the film was not accepted at the Sundance Film Festival.

In 2004, Mirvish spearheaded the effort to get the Academy of Motion Picture Arts & Sciences to reactivate their Best Original Musical Oscar category. In a controversial move, the Academy canceled the category after Mirvish and others submitted the requisite number of films, including two by Mirvish.

In 2009, he co-authored the satirical novel I Am Martin Eisenstadt: One Man's (Wildly Inappropriate) Adventures with the Last Republicans published by Farrar, Straus and Giroux ISBN 978-0-86547-914-2.

Mirvish directed the film Between Us, based on the play of the same name by Joe Hortua. The four-person drama stars Taye Diggs, Melissa George, David Harbour and Julia Stiles. The original play premiered at Manhattan Theatre Club, and Hortua and Mirvish co-wrote the screenplay adaptation. The film version won the grand jury prize at the 2012 Bahamas International Film Festival, and was the Closing Night Film at the 50th Annual Gijón International Film Festival in Spain. The film had its world premiere at the Oldenburg International Film Festival, and also screened at such festivals as Athens International Film Festival, the Hamptons, Woodstock Film Festival, Slamdance Film Festival, Napa Valley Film Festival, and Whistler Film Festival.

In 2016, Mirvish wrote the nonfiction book The Cheerful Subversive's Guide to Independent Filmmaking. The phrase "cheerful subversive" comes from a New York Times article describing the original Slamdance filmmakers.

In 2016, Mirvish directed the feature film Bernard and Huey written by Oscar/Pulitzer/Obie-winner Jules Feiffer.

Mirvish directed the feature film 18½ which had its world premiere at the 2021 Woodstock Film Festival. The film had its international premiere at the São Paulo International Film Festival The film had its European premiere at the Gijón International Film Festival The film won the Stubbornly Independent Award at the Tallgrass Film Festival in 2021

Mirvish is widely credited as the discoverer of the Hathaway effect, which indicates that when actress Anne Hathaway is in the news, the share price for Warren Buffett's Berkshire Hathaway increases.

He was also a speechwriter for Senator Tom Harkin of Iowa.

== Filmography ==
- 18½ (2021)
- Bernard and Huey (2017)
- Between Us (2012)
- The Last Republican (2008)
- Sheldon (2007)
- The Few & the Proud (2007)
- Half Empty (2006)
- A Message from the President of Iran (2006)
- Open House (2004)
- Omaha (The Movie) (1994)
