= 18½ =

2021 American film

- Poster
- Directed by: Dan Mirvish
- Screenplay by: Daniel Moya
- Story by: Dan Mirvish; Daniel Moya
- Produced by: Dan Mirvish; Daniel Moya; Terry Keefe
- Starring: Willa Fitzgerald; John Magaro; Vondie Curtis-Hall; Catherine Curtin; Richard Kind; Sullivan Jones; Bruce Campbell; Jon Cryer; Ted Raimi
- Cinematography: Elle Schneider
- Edited by: Dan Mirvish
- Music by: Luis Guerra
- Production companies: Bugeater Films; Kyyba Films
- Distributed by: Adventure Entertainment
- Release dates: October 2021 (Woodstock Film Festival); May 26, 2022 (United States)
- Running time: 88 minutes
- Country: United States
- Language: English

18½ is a 2021 American comedy thriller film directed by Dan Mirvish and written by Daniel Moya, based on a story by both. The film stars Willa Fitzgerald, John Magaro, Vondie Curtis-Hall, Catherine Curtin, Richard Kind, Sullivan Jones and the voices of Jon Cryer as H. R. Haldeman, Ted Raimi as Alexander Haig and Bruce Campbell as President Richard Nixon.

== Plot ==
In 1974, with the Watergate scandal dominating the news, Connie Lashley, a junior transcriber at the Nixon White House, ends up with the only recording of the notorious gap in the president's tapes. Shaken by what she has heard, she contacts Paul Marrow, a reporter at The New York Times, and offers to let him hear it. The two meet for the first time at a quiet roadside diner and then drive out to the Silver Sands Motel, a faded coastal resort, hoping to play the reel in private.

The recorder Paul has brought turns out to be broken, and their hunt for a working one keeps drawing them into the orbit of the motel's other guests and staff: the eccentric one-eyed desk clerk Jack, a beach commune of hippies led by Barry, and an older married pair, Samuel and Lena, who own a tape machine but will lend it only once the younger couple joins them for dinner. To avoid drawing attention, Connie and Paul pretend to be newlyweds, a cover that becomes harder to keep up as the dinner drags on and their hosts pry into the marriage. By the time they finally sit down to listen, it is no longer clear who among the people around them can be trusted.

== Cast ==
- Willa Fitzgerald as Connie
- John Magaro as Paul
- Vondie Curtis-Hall as Samuel
- Catherine Curtin as Lena
- Richard Kind as Jack
- Sullivan Jones as Barry
- Alanna Saunders as Daisy
- Claire Saunders as Daffodil
- Ted Raimi as the voice of Alexander Haig
- Jon Cryer as the voice of H. R. Haldeman
- Bruce Campbell as the voice of Richard Nixon
- Lloyd Kaufman as Jeffries
- Marija Abney as Cheryl
- Gina Kreiezmar as Deb

== Production ==
The film started shooting March 3, 2020, at the Silver Sands Motel and Cottages in Greenport, Suffolk County, New York. Production was halted after 11 days due to the COVID-19 pandemic. For the next six months, Mirvish edited the footage they had, composer Luis Guerra worked on the music, and the production team recorded voice sessions for the fictional 18½-minute gap in the Nixon White House tapes with Bruce Campbell, Jon Cryer and Ted Raimi over Zoom. Filming resumed in September 2020, for the final four days once COVID protocols were in place with the Directors Guild of America and Screen Actors Guild.

== Release ==
Adventure Entertainment released the film theatrically in the United States starting on May 27, 2022. The film came out in the UK on July 11, 2022. The film was released on airlines JetBlue, Virgin Atlantic, Emirates, Qatar Airways, Air New Zealand and Singapore Airlines, through distributor Gate23. The DVD special edition of the film was released on April 9, 2024, from MVD Entertainment Group. The DVD includes a feature length behind-the-scenes documentary called "Covid 18½: The Making of a Film in a Global Pandemic," as well as a commentary track from director Dan Mirvish and screenwriter Daniel Moya, audio of full Richard Nixon tape with Bruce Campbell, Ted Raimi and Jon Cryer, and a live audience track from film's world premiere at Woodstock Film Festival. Over 830 DVDs were sold to public libraries in at least 500 cities in 46 states and 5 provinces in North America. The film became available on library streaming site Kanopy at the end of 2024 and is also available on public library streaming site Hoopla.

=== Festivals ===
18½ was selected to screen at the following film festivals:

- 2021 Woodstock Film Festival
- 2021 Sao Paulo International Film Festival
- 2021 Gijón International Film Festival
- 2021 Whistler Film Festival.
- 2021 St. Louis Film Festival
- 2021 Tallgrass Film Festival
- 2021 Rome International Film Festival
- 2021 Anchorage International Film Festival.
- 2022 Manchester International Film Festival
- 2022 Cinequest Film Festival
- 2022 RiverRun International Film Festival
- 2022 Oxford Film Festival

== Reception ==
The review aggregator website Rotten Tomatoes gave the film a 78% approval rating, based on 45 reviews. The website's consensus reads, "Some tonal inconsistency makes 18 1/2 more of a 7/10, but this well-acted period piece mines the Watergate scandal for fresh, insightful dramedy."

Richard Roeper of the Chicago Sun-Times wrote, "Just when you thought we might have covered this dark chapter in American history from all angles, along comes the slyly subversive, occasionally loony and thoroughly entertaining 18 ½, which is fictional and yet contains essential truths and clever insights throughout." Matt Zoller Seitz of RogerEbert.com wrote, "it's a film that sticks in the mind after you've watched it. Every choice is made with confidence, but from an intuitive place, like decisions made by a lucid dreamer." Noel Murray of the Los Angeles Times wrote, "Mirvish's excellent cast approaches this sequence like a one-act play, swinging at every curveball their fellow actors throw. Nothing they're saying matters much, but they say it with such verve and passion that they pull the audience right into the free-floating anxiety of a fraught time in American history, a half-century ago."

The film was one of 301 features qualified as eligible for the 95th Academy Awards. The original songs "Brasília Bella", "Wonder Bread" and "Deadly Butterfly" from the film were 3 out of the 82 songs qualified for the 2023 Academy Awards Best Original Song category. "Brasília Bella" was considered an "Oscar Contender" by The Hollywood Reporter, IndieWire and GoldDerby.
