= Martin Eisenstadt =

Media hoax personality

The Martin Eisenstadt hoax is an elaborate scheme of filmmakers Dan Mirvish and Eitan Gorlin that involved the creation of a fictional "talking head", Martin Eisenstadt, who was quoted by numerous major news outlets (such as the Los Angeles Times and MSNBC), as well as countless blogs, all of which failed to verify his actual existence. "Eisenstadt" claimed to be the source of commentary about Sarah Palin in the wake of John McCain's 2008 presidential campaign. Mirvish and Gorlin have since written a satirical novel called I Am Martin Eisenstadt: One Man's (Wildly Inappropriate) Adventures with the Last Republicans for Farrar, Straus and Giroux ISBN 978-0-86547-914-2. The book was written under Eisenstadt's pseudonym and purports to be a first-person memoir of Eisenstadt's experience with the McCain/Palin campaign, including buying Palin's wardrobe. In the book, the Eisenstadt character denies rumors that he does not exist.

== Background ==
In 2007, Mirvish and Gorlin created short videos for YouTube, with Gorlin playing a parking valet, Sheldon, who spewed effusive (and offensive) praise of then-presidential candidate Rudolph Giuliani. The original short film Sheldon played at the U.S. Comedy Arts Film Festival in Aspen in 2007. After Giuliani's campaign ceased, the character was modified to be a Sr. Fellow at the "Harding Institute for Freedom and Democracy", a fictional entity named in jest for one of the least-respected US presidents, Warren G. Harding. The pair created a website for the Harding Institute, created the character of the commentator, dubbed Martin Eisenstadt, played again by Gorlin.

Dan Mirvish is a former speechwriter for Democratic Senator Tom Harkin. He is also a feature film director and co-founder of the Slamdance Film Festival. Gorlin was nominated for the Someone to Watch Award at the 2003 IFP Independent Spirit Awards for his film The Holy Land.

== Hoaxes ==
The first appearance of Martin Eisenstadt was in a video of a phony interview, purportedly on Al Iraqiya, describing his plan to build casinos in the Green Zone. The report was accepted at face value and blogged by Jonathan Stein of Mother Jones, but correctly and tentatively identified as satire by the Monthly Review.

During and after the election campaign, several hoaxes perpetrated by Eisenstadt (Gorlin and Mirvish) were reported by news organizations and blogs as truthful, including reports that Joe the Plumber was a cousin of Charles Keating and that Paris Hilton's family strongly protested the McCain campaign's comparison of Barack Obama to Hilton.

After election day, 2008, it was widely reported that a senior McCain advisor had stated that Palin was unaware that Africa was a continent rather than a country. After the story broke, Mirvish and Gorlin released a video where Eisenstadt, reportedly a McCain policy adviser, made that statement. Mirvish and Gorlin said that they did not invent the story but only took the credit for it after it broke as being the source. Several mainstream news outlets publicised this attribution.

The AP, noting that "Eisenstadt's 'work' had been quoted and debunked before," reported that the hoax "was limited to the identity of the source in the story about Palin - not the Fox News story itself." Mirvish himself, in a BBC interview, admits that they falsely took credit as being the source, but stated that the story itself could be true.

According to Mirvish it would have taken "about 20 seconds of searching to realize Eisenstadt was a hoax." "With the 24-hour news cycle they rush into anything they can find" added Mirvish. The hoax revealed lack of fact-checking by news outlets such as MSNBC. An MSNBC spokesman stated that someone in the newsroom received the item in an e-mail, and that no vetting was ever done on it.

In May 2009, Time reported that Eisenstadt was one of the "elite Twitterati" who attended the White House Correspondents Dinner, along with Meghan McCain, Ashton Kutcher, and Newt Gingrich. Time later retracted its original reporting.

== Book ==
Mirvish and Gorlin wrote the book I Am Martin Eisenstadt: One Man's (wildly inappropriate) Adventures with the Last Republicans which was published in November, 2009, by Farrar, Straus and Giroux. The authors went on a book tour that included a Washington, DC, party thrown for them by former President Bill Clinton press secretary Joe Lockhart and other Washington notables including Karen Finney, Matthew Cooper (American journalist) and Michael Feldman.

== Videos ==
Mirvish and Gorlin's first collaboration was a promo for a video game for Mirvish's film Open House. The character they created turned into Sheldon, the bitter valet, for the eponymously titled short film that screened at the 2007 U.S. Comedy Arts Festival in Aspen. The duo shot seven more similar shorts and posted them anonymously on YouTube as faux Rudolph Giuliani ads during early primary season for the 2008 U.S. Presidential campaign. The Giuliani campaign denied any involvement with the ads. The ads created their own controversy when the consulting company who had produced the Swift Boat ads of 2004 was erroneously blamed for them under the assumption they were some sort of dirty tricks campaign by one of Giuliani's rivals.

The filmmakers had planned to develop The Bitter Valet into a TV series, but due to the 2008 Writers Guild Strike, they shelved that plan and came up with the Martin Eisenstadt character. The first thing they filmed with Eisenstadt was the alleged interview on Iraqi TV, which was actually filmed in Mirvish's garage in California.

During the fall of 2008, Gorlin and Mirvish filmed a fake 40-minute BBC documentary entitled "The Last Republican," which they then posted on YouTube in 10 parts. They also filmed four rebuttals allegedly from Martin Eisenstadt in Washington, DC, in which Eisenstadt threatened to sue the documentarian and the BBC for taking him out of context. In fact, the filmmakers later admitted that "The Last Republican" was actually a pilot for a television show they were developing.

== Harding Prize for Best Crafted Apologies ==
In April, 2010, Mirvish and Gorlin created an award called "The Harding Prize for Best Crafted Apology" named after President Warren G. Harding, who once apologized for his presidency by saying "I am not fit for this office and should never have been here." Awarded in a ceremony at American University, Gorlin (as Martin Eisenstadt) presented the Harding Prizes in several categories: Rahm Emanuel won for Politics, Tiger Woods for Sports, Usher for Entertainment, and Adam Carolla won in the best Twitter apology category.
