= Journey to the End of the Night (film) =

2006 film by Eric Eason

- Directed by: Eric Eason
- Written by: Eric Eason
- Produced by: Richard N. Gladstein; James Acheson; Frank Demartini
- Starring: Brendan Fraser; Mos Def; Alice Braga; Scott Glenn; Catalina Sandino Moreno; Matheus Nachtergaele
- Cinematography: Ulrich Burtin
- Edited by: Kevin Greutert
- Music by: Elia Cmiral
- Production company: Millennium Films
- Distributed by: First Look International
- Release date: April 28, 2006 (Tribeca Film Festival)
- Running time: 98 minutes
- Countries: Brazil; Germany; United States
- Languages: Portuguese; English; Yoruba
- Budget: $6.2 million
- Box office: $49,147

Journey to the End of the Night is a 2006 independent crime thriller film directed by Eric Eason starring Brendan Fraser, Mos Def, Scott Glenn, Alice Braga and Catalina Sandino Moreno.

== Plot ==
In a dark and decadent area of São Paulo, Brazil, exiled Americans Sinatra and his son Paul own a brothel. Paul is a compulsive gambler addicted to cocaine. Sinatra is married to a former prostitute named Angie, with whom he has a son.

A Russian client is killed by his wife in their establishment, leaving behind a suitcase filled with drugs. On the night that they have scheduled a negotiation to sell the contents of the suitcase to African buyers, their go-between dies while having sex with a trans woman named Nazda. In desperation, Sinatra makes a deal with the Nigerian dishwasher of the brothel, Wemba, who is to travel to the harbor of Santos, taking the place of the go-between, and make the sale to the drug dealers. In return, Wemba would receive a large amount of money.

Wemba accepts but, while returning to his car in the harbor, he is attacked by two small-time thieves and knocked unconscious. His lack of contact with Sinatra and Paul starts a chain-reaction of misunderstandings that lead to a tragic end.

== Cast ==
- Brendan Fraser as Paul
- Mos Def as Wemba
- Scott Glenn as Sinatra
- Alice Braga as Monique
- Catalina Sandino Moreno as Angie
- Ruy Polanah as The Soothsayer
- Matheus Nachtergaele as Nazda
- Gilson Adalberto Gomes as Samy
- Milhem Cortaz as Rodrigo
- Luke Denis Nolan as Lazare
