= The Holy Land (film) =

- Directed by: Eitan Gorlin
- Written by: Eitan Gorlin
- Produced by: Ran Bogin; Udi Yerushalmi
- Starring: Oren Rehany; Tchelet Semel; Saul Stein; Albert Iluz; Arie Moskuna
- Cinematography: Nils Kenaston
- Edited by: Josh Apter; Yair Elazar
- Music by: Chris Cunningham
- Release date: 22 April 2001 (Los Angeles)
- Running time: 108 minutes
- Country: Israel
- Languages: English; Arabic; Russian; Hebrew

The Holy Land is a 2001 Israeli drama film written and directed by Eitan Gorlin and starring Oren Rehany, Tchelet Semel, Saul Stein, Albert Iluz, Arie Moskuna. It is Gorlin's directorial debut.

== Cast ==
- Oren Rehany as Mendy
- Tchelet Semel as Natasha “Sasha” Sonsova
- Saul Stein as Mike
- Albert Iluz as Razi
- Arie Moskuna as The Exterminator

== Production ==
The film was shot on location in Israel.

== Reception ==
The film has a 51% rating on Rotten Tomatoes.

== Awards and nominations ==
The film won the grand jury prize for best feature at the 2002 Slamdance Film Festival and the best film prize at the 2002 Avignon New York festival. Gorlin was also nominated for the Someone to Watch Award at the 18th Independent Spirit Awards.
