= Bernard and Huey =

2017 American film

- Directed by: Dan Mirvish
- Written by: Jules Feiffer
- Produced by: Dan Mirvish; Bernie Stern; Will McCance
- Starring: David Koechner; Jim Rash; Sasha Alexander; Eka Darville; Richard Kind; Lauren Miller Rogen; Nancy Travis; Bellamy Young; Mae Whitman
- Cinematography: Todd Antonio Somodevilla
- Edited by: Daniel Capuzzi
- Music by: Luis Guerra
- Production companies: Bugeater Films; Unfound Content; Rent My Brain Productions
- Distributed by: Freestyle Digital Media
- Release dates: September 15, 2017 (Oldenburg); June 8, 2018 (United States)
- Running time: 91 minutes
- Country: United States
- Language: English

Bernard and Huey is a 2017 American comedy-drama film directed by Dan Mirvish and written by Jules Feiffer, based on characters Feiffer created for his eponymous comic strip in The Village Voice. Feiffer originally wrote the screenplay in 1986, and it was nearly lost for close to three decades. The film stars David Koechner, Jim Rash, Sasha Alexander, Eka Darville, Richard Kind, Lauren Miller Rogen, Nancy Travis, Bellamy Young, and Mae Whitman.

== Cast ==
- Jim Rash as Bernard
- David Koechner as Huey
- Sasha Alexander as Roz
- Eka Darville as Conrad
- Richard Kind as Marty
- Lauren Miller Rogen as Stephanie
- Nancy Travis as Mona
- Bellamy Young as Aggie
- Mae Whitman as Zelda

== Release ==
The film had its world premiere at the Oldenburg International Film Festival. Freestyle Digital Media, which is owned by Byron Allen, acquired all U.S. and Canadian rights to the film in January 2018 and plans on a theatrical release starting June 8.

=== Festivals ===
'Bernard and Huey' has screened at over 25 film festivals and won the grand jury prize at the 2017 Guam International Film Festival. The film won the Best Screenplay award at the Manchester Film Festival, the "Best Film from the American Continent" (sic) award at the Jaipur International Film Festival and was the Closing Night Film at the Slamdance Film Festival.

'Bernard and Huey' was selected to screen at the following film festivals:

- 2017 Oldenburg International Film Festival
- 2017 Festival du Nouveau Cinema
- 2017 Sao Paulo International Film Festival
- 2017 Tallinn Black Nights Film Festival
- 2018 Slamdance Film Festival
- 2017 Whistler Film Festival.
- 2017 Cork Film Festival
- 2017 Rome Independent Film Festival
- 2018 Barbados Independent Film Festival
- 2017 Napa Valley Film Festival
- 2017 Denver Film Festival
- 2017 Cucalorus Film Festival
- 2017 St. Louis Film Festival
- 2017 Virginia Film Festival
- 2018 Cinequest Film Festival
