= Confidence (2003 film) =

2003 film by James Foley

- Theatrical release poster
- Directed by: James Foley
- Written by: Doug Jung
- Produced by: Scott Bernstein; Michael Burns; Marc Butan
- Starring: Edward Burns; Rachel Weisz; Andy García; Paul Giamatti; Donal Logue; Luis Guzmán; Brian Van Holt; Franky G Robert Forster; Morris Chestnut; Dustin Hoffman
- Cinematography: Juan Ruiz Anchía
- Edited by: Stuart Levy
- Music by: Christophe Beck; Dave Crawford
- Production companies: Ignite Entertainment; Cinewhite
- Distributed by: Lionsgate Films (United States); Universum Film (Germany)
- Release date: April 25, 2003
- Running time: 97 minutes
- Countries: United States; Germany
- Language: English
- Budget: $15 million
- Box office: $23 million

Confidence is a 2003 American crime drama film starring Edward Burns, Dustin Hoffman, Andy Garcia and Rachel Weisz, directed by James Foley and written by Doug Jung.

== Plot ==
A group of grifters rip off their latest mark and celebrate, while de facto group leader, Jake Vig, explains the art of the con. When one of the four, Alphonse "Big Al" Morley, is found shot to death, the other three learn that the latest money they stole belonged to Winston King, a local Los Angeles crime lord known as The King. Jake proposes that the grifters work for The King and steal money from Morgan Price, a rival who owns a bank.

Jake enlists the aid of his remaining partners, Gordo and Miles, and also convinces an independent con artist named Lily to round out their foursome. The King, a ruthless killer with ADHD, demands that one of his men, Lupus, also go along.

The con involves bribing a bank vice president to wire money offshore. The plan hits a snag when Special Agent Gunther Butan shows up in Los Angeles looking to finally bust Jake, whom he has followed for years. Butan forces corrupt LAPD detectives Omar Manzano and Lloyd Whitworth to switch their allegiance from Jake to him.

After hearing about Butan's arrival, a nervous Jake pulls the plug on the whole con. He admonishes Lily, making her walk out. Lupus gets Jake to reconsider nixing the con, hinting that The King will torture and kill the grifters if the plan falls short. The con is back on, although now without Lily's help.

The bribed bank vice president wires the money to Gordo in Belize. Gordo takes it to Ontario Airport, where he is met by both Butan and The King's men, both sides after the $5 million in a duffel bag. Butan arrests The King and confiscates the money.

Gordo disappears. Lupus, thinking The King has the money, reveals he was the one who killed Big Al. Lupus holds Jake at gunpoint, but he is shot by Travis, a henchman for Morgan Price. It turns out that when Lily walked out, she went straight to Price and revealed the entire con, which was taking place that minute. Price told Travis to locate Jake to find out exactly how the con was engineered, and to stop such a thing from ever happening again.

Travis takes Jake to an abandoned lot, and forces him to explain the entire story. A furious Lily takes out a gun and shoots Jake. Travis demands that he and Lily both disappear immediately. Minutes later, Butan arrives in a car, and Jake sits up from a pool of blood, unharmed.

The final parts of the con are revealed. Lily's "quitting" was faked; a set-up to confuse Lupus. Butan is actually an old confidant of Jake's. He managed to "confiscate" the money and arrest The King at the same time. Butan has the money, and it's split five ways. Jake was wearing squibs to fake his own death in the lot.

In the end, everyone was in on everything except for The King and Lupus (the first marks), Price and Travis (the second, bigger marks), and the two corrupt LAPD detectives, who have been arrested. The four grifters reunite and celebrate, driving off into the night.

== Cast ==
- Edward Burns as Jake Vig
- Rachel Weisz as Lily
- Andy García as Special Agent Gunther Butan
- Dustin Hoffman as Winston "The King" King
- Paul Giamatti as Gordo
- Brian Van Holt as Miles
- Franky G as Lupus
- Luis Guzmán as Officer Omar Manzano
- Donal Logue as Officer Lloyd Whitworth
- Morris Chestnut as Travis
- Louis Lombardi as Alphonse "Big Al" Moorley
- John Carroll Lynch as Leon Ashby
- Robert Forster as Morgan Price
- Leland Orser as Lionel Dolby

== Production ==
The movie was filmed on-location at the Deep Nightclub in Hollywood, as well as around Los Angeles and Ontario, California.

== Reception ==
On review aggregate website Rotten Tomatoes, Confidence holds a 68% approval rating based on 155 reviews, with an average rating of 6.3/10. The website's consensus reads: "While it may not be the best con in town, the movie still manages to entertain with its colorful cast." Metacritic, which uses a weighted average, assigned the film a score of 59 out of 100, based on 35 critics, indicating "mixed or average" reviews.

Awarding the film two out of four stars, Roger Ebert of the Chicago Sun-Times wrote,

Confidence is a flawless exercise about con games, and that is precisely its failing: It is an exercise. It fails to make us care, even a little, about the characters and what happens to them. There is nothing at stake. The screenplay gives away the game by having the entire story narrated in flashback by the hero, who treats it not as an adventure but as a series of devious deceptions which he can patiently explain to the man holding a gun on him--and to us. At the end, we can see how smart he is and how everybody was fooled, but we don't care. ... That's not to say the movie, directed by James Foley, is badly made. It's great-looking, with its film noir reds and greens and blues, its neon Bud Ice signs, its shadows and mean streets, its sleazy strip clubs and its use of wipes and swish-pans (sideways, up, down, sometimes two at a time). You know this is a crime movie, which is nice to be reminded of, except that every reminder also tells us it's only a movie, so that there is no possibility that we can commit to the characters, worry about them, want them to succeed or fail.

== Remake ==
The film was remade in Bollywood and was titled Ek Khiladi Ek Haseena.
