= Przemysław Reut =

Polish filmmaker based in New York City (born 1969)

Przemysław Reut (born 1969) is a Polish filmmaker based in New York City. He won the Someone to Watch Award at the 18th Independent Spirit Awards for his work in the film Paradox Lake (2002).

Reut studied journalism at the University of Warsaw and film at the School of Visual Arts.

== Filmography ==
- Close Up (1996)
- Paradox Lake (2002)
