= Better Things (TV series) =

American comedy-drama television series

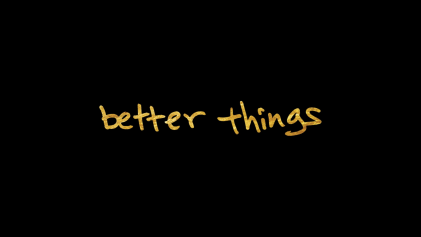
- Intertitle from seasons 3–5.
- Genre: Comedy drama
- Created by: Pamela Adlon; Louis C.K.
- Showrunner: Pamela Adlon
- Directed by: Pamela Adlon; Various (season 1)
- Starring: Pamela Adlon; Mikey Madison; Hannah Alligood; Olivia Edward; Celia Imrie
- Opening theme: "Mother" by John Lennon/Plastic Ono Band (seasons 1–2)
- Composer: Jay Gruska
- Country of origin: United States
- Original language: English
- No. of seasons: 5
- No. of episodes: 52

Production
- Executive producers: Pamela Adlon; M. Blair Breard (seasons 1–2); Dave Becky (seasons 1–2); Louis C.K. (seasons 1–2)
- Producer: Joanne Toll
- Editor: Debra F. Simone
- Camera setup: Single-camera
- Running time: 20–48 minutes
- Production companies: Pig Newton, Inc. (seasons 1–2); Slam Book, Inc.; 3 Arts Entertainment (seasons 1–2); FXP

Original release
- Network: FX
- Release: September 8, 2016 – April 25, 2022

Better Things is an American comedy drama television series created by Pamela Adlon and Louis C.K., which ran for five seasons between 2016 and 2022 on FX. It stars Adlon as a divorced actress who raises her three daughters—played by Mikey Madison, Hannah Alligood and Olivia Edward—on her own.

Better Things premiered on FX on September 8, 2016. The ten-episode first season was received warmly by critics. Four more seasons followed, in 2017, 2019, 2020 and 2022, all to critical acclaim. Adlon's performance has especially been praised; she was nominated for a Primetime Emmy Award for Outstanding Lead Actress in a Comedy Series in 2017 and 2018. Better Things received a Peabody Award in April 2017, with the board stating: "[...] this searingly funny and beautiful show is an at-times raw examination of the vicissitudes of working motherhood, crackling with feminist verve and energy, that consistently cuts new ground". The series concluded on April 25, 2022.

== Cast ==
=== Main ===
- Pamela Adlon as Samantha "Sam" Fox, a single mother and working actress raising three daughters in Los Angeles.
- Mikey Madison as Maxine "Max" Fox, Sam's volatile and angry but essentially decent oldest daughter.
- Hannah Alligood (Note: Credited as Hannah Riley, having switched to her middle name as her surname, during season 5.) as Francesca "Frankie" Fox, Sam's strong-willed and rebellious middle child.
- Olivia Edward as Duke Alice Fox, Sam's adorable and sweet-hearted youngest daughter.
- Celia Imrie as Phyllis "Phil" Darby, Sam's British mother who lives next door to her daughter with some looming physical and mental issues.

=== Recurring ===
- Diedrich Bader as Rich, Sam's best friend, who is gay and has about the same amount of luck with men as Sam does
- Alysia Reiner as Sunny, Sam's newly divorced best friend
- Greg Cromer as Jeff, Sunny's pot-smoking and lazy ex-husband
- Rebecca Metz as Tressa, Sam's understated and very competent manager and friend
- Matthew Glave as Xander Hall, Sam's ex-husband and Max, Frankie, and Duke's absentee father
- Mather Zickel as one of Sam's ex-boyfriends
- Lucy Davis as Macy, Sam's close friend who has serious personal problems (seasons 1–2)
- Patricia Scanlon as Joy, one of Sam's friends (seasons 1–2)
- Emma Shannon as Pepper, Duke's friend (seasons 1–5)
- Kevin Pollak as Marion, Sam's brother (seasons 2–5)
- Jeremy K. Williams as Jason, Frankie's friend (seasons 2–5)
- Alex Désert as Donte, an actor who has worked with Sam in a car commercial and in Monsters in the Moonlight (seasons 2–3)
- Henry Thomas as Robin, a single father and Sam's boyfriend (season 2)
- Judy Reyes as Lala, Sam's friend (seasons 3–5)
- Cree Summer as Lenny, Sam's friend (seasons 3–5)
- Matthew Broderick as Dr. David Miller, Sam's therapist with whom Sam becomes romantically involved (season 3)
- Janina Gavankar as Nikki, an assistant director on Monsters in the Moonlight (season 3)
- Marsha Thomason as Mer Kodis, a talent manager who shows romantic interest in Sam (season 3)
- Kris Marshall as Tibor, director of Monsters in the Moonlight (season 3)
- Doug Jones as himself, an actor in Monsters in the Moonlight (season 3)
- Harrison Page as Walter, Phil's boyfriend (season 3)
- Adam Kulbersh as Murray Fox, Sam's father who appears as a ghost to her and Duke (season 3; guest season 1 & 5)
- Judy Gold as Chaya, one of Sam's friends (seasons 4–5)
- Mario Cantone as Mal Martone, Sam's new manager (seasons 4–5)
- Rosalind Chao as Caroline, Marion's wife (seasons 4–5)

=== Notable guest stars ===
- Julie Bowen as herself ("Sam/Pilot")
- Bradley Whitford as Gary ("Sam/Pilot")
- Constance Zimmer as herself ("Sam/Pilot")
- Cleopatra Coleman as Dr. Okoye ("Period")
- Rae Dawn Chong as Patty Donner ("Period" and "Only Women Bleed")
- Lenny Kravitz as Mel Trueblood ("Brown")
- David Duchovny as himself ("Brown")
- Danny Pudi as Danny ("Woman Is the Something of the Something")
- Zach Woods as Zach ("Woman Is the Something of the Something")
- Joe Walsh as himself ("Hair of the Dog")
- John Ales as Rodney ("Rising")
- Tom Kenny as himself ("Robin")
- Billy West as himself ("Robin")
- Robert Michael Morris as Ray ("Eulogy")
- Rade Šerbedžija as Arnold Hall ("Arnold Hall")
- Jane Carr as Jarita ("White Rock")
- Nigel Havers as Lester ("White Rock")
- Sharon Stone as Reiki ("Nesting")
- Glynn Turman as Rocket ("Nesting")
- David Choe as Postmates Guy ("Easter")
- Mark Feuerstein as himself ("The Unknown")
- Griffin Dunne as Durham ("The Unknown")
- Molly Shannon ("New Orleans")
- Randy Rainbow as Andrew ("New Orleans")
- Ellen Geer as the lady ghost ("Listen to the Roosters")
- Mike Judge as himself ("She's Fifty")
- Lance Henriksen as Virgil ("She's Fifty")
- Angela Kinsey as Fredericka ("F*ck Anatoly's Mom")
- Ron Cephas Jones as himself ("Rip Taylor's Cell Phone" and "San Francisco")
- Marty Krofft as himself ("Rip Taylor's Cell Phone")
- Danny Trejo as himself ("Oh, I'm Not Gonna Tell Her" and "Ephemera")
- Phil LaMarr as Cemetery Tour Guide ("Ephemera")
- Lennon Parham as Paige ("The World Is Mean Right Now" and "We Are Not Alone")
- Lena Waithe as Elijah ("San Francisco")
- Rainbow Sun Francks as Cope ("Jesus Saves")
- Casey Wilson as Yancey ("Jesus Saves")

== Production and development ==
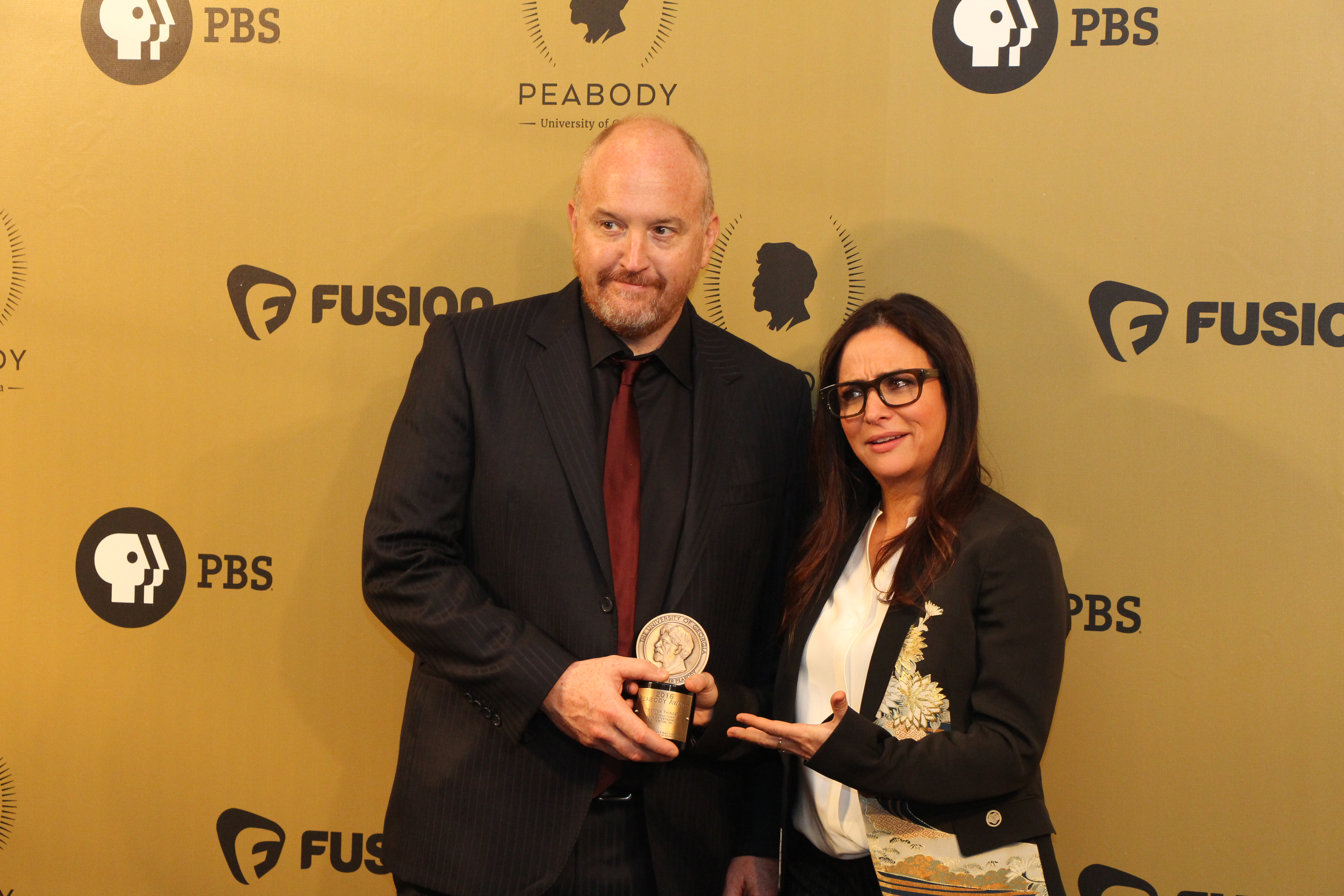
Louis C.K. and Pamela Adlon in 2017

The pilot was ordered by FX on January 18, 2015. It was written by Louis C.K. and Pamela Adlon, and directed by Louis C.K. The story is semi-autobiographically based on Adlon's life. The pilot was picked up for a 10-episode first season on August 7, 2015.

The show is named after the song "Better Things" by The Kinks.

On September 20, 2016, FX renewed the series for a second season, which premiered on September 14, 2017. In October 2017, FX renewed the series for a third season, which premiered on February 28, 2019, and consisted of 12 episodes, all directed by Adlon. In November 2017, after Louis C.K. confirmed the sexual misconduct allegations against him were true, FX canceled their overall deal with C.K. and his production company, Pig Newton. It was announced that C.K. would have no involvement in future seasons of the series. That month, Adlon fired 3 Arts manager Dave Becky as her manager. Pig Newton and 3 Arts no longer co-produced the series after the Season 2 finale. For the third season, Adlon hired four new writers for the series, Sarah Gubbins, Joe Hortua, Robin Ruzan, and Ira Parker.

In March 2019, the series was renewed for a 10-episode fourth season that premiered on March 5, 2020. In May 2020, the series was renewed for a fifth season, which was announced to be its last in October 2021.

=== Podcast ===
Adlon launched a podcast titled Better Things with Pamela Adlon during the show's final season. The goal was to give insight to the creative process behind the show. Constructed as a companion to the final season, it featured guests like Diedrich Bader, Kevin Pollak, Olivia Edward, and Celia Imrie.

== Episodes ==
Season	Episodes	Originally released	
Season	Episodes	First released	Last released
1	10	September 8, 2016	November 10, 2016
2	10	September 14, 2017	November 16, 2017
3	12	February 28, 2019	May 16, 2019
4	10	March 5, 2020	April 30, 2020
5	10	February 28, 2022	April 25, 2022

=== Season 1 (2016) ===
No. overall	No. in season	Title	Directed by	Written by	Original release date	Prod. code	U.S. viewers (millions)
1	1	"Sam/Pilot"	Louis C.K.	Pamela Adlon & Louis C.K.	September 8, 2016	XBG01001	0.671
Sam Fox is introduced as a working actress with three daughters (an angry eldest, a fiery middle, and a sweetheart youngest), various middle-aged men in her life, and an increasingly addled mom living across the street.
2	2	"Period"	Pamela Adlon	Story by : Pamela Adlon; Teleplay by : Louis C.K.	September 15, 2016	XBG01007	0.570
Sam hopes that she can no longer get pregnant, then has to handle her daughters' escalating bad behavior and her mom's heightened eccentricity.
3	3	"Brown"	Nisha Ganatra	Louis C.K.	September 22, 2016	XBG01006	0.382
Sam's latest acting job allows her to spend quality time with her best friend Sunny and less-endearing time with Sunny's nasty pothead husband Jeff. She also lands a date with a handsome African-American man but their dinner together at her house is ruined by Grandma Phil's racism.
4	4	"Woman Is the Something of the Something"	Nisha Ganatra	Pamela Adlon & Louis C.K.	September 29, 2016	XBG01003	0.455
Sam is briefly up for a leading sitcom role, but never knows about it because her agent doesn't want her to be hurt if (when) it doesn't pan out. A fire alarm brings chaos to the house, while a feminist event at Frankie's school brings her and Sam closer together.
5	5	"Future Fever"	Lance Bangs	Pamela Adlon & Louis C.K. and Cindy Chupack	October 6, 2016	XBG01004	0.439
Sam takes care of Frankie when she runs a high fever, Duke when she has coins to turn in at the bank, and Max when a frank look at her lackluster academic career leaves her despondent over her unpromising college prospects.
6	6	"Alarms"	Lance Bangs	Pamela Adlon & Louis C.K. and Gina Fattore	October 13, 2016	XBG01009	0.406
The men are not alright as Sam has to deal with gross colleagues, her utterly useless ex, a sleazy fake-admirer, and Sunny's zero of a husband Jeff (when they find out he's on Tinder). But more interaction with an addled Phil brings some good work and cheer to Sam and her girls.
7	7	"Duke's Chorus"	Lance Bangs	Pamela Adlon & Louis C.K.	October 20, 2016	XBG01005	0.460
Sam clashes with the Mormon mom of a friend of Duke's, until they each come to understand the others' difficult situation. Max's behavior towards Sam is worse than ever, and Frankie concludes that there is no God.
8	8	"Scary Fun"	Nisha Ganatra	Pamela Adlon & Louis C.K.	October 27, 2016	XBG01008	0.381
Sam warns Harvey, a boyfriend of Max's, that she doesn't trust him around her daughter. Sam and Frankie play pranks on each other. Max is left heartbroken when she is dumped by Harvey, so Sam, Frankie, and Duke stay at home instead of going out for Halloween to cheer her up.
9	9	"Hair of the Dog"	Nisha Ganatra	Pamela Adlon	November 3, 2016	XBG01002	0.426
Sam takes Max and her friend to a Joe Walsh concert where unexpected info is revealed.
10	10	"Only Women Bleed"	Pamela Adlon	Pamela Adlon & Louis C.K.	November 10, 2016	XBG01010	0.547
After a chaotic morning, Sam gets to work, but that's interrupted when Frankie is sent home from school and Max later tells her mom something about Frankie.

=== Season 2 (2017) ===
No. overall	No. in season	Title	Directed by	Written by	Original release date	Prod. code	U.S. viewers (millions)
11	1	"September"	Pamela Adlon	Pamela Adlon & Louis C.K.	September 14, 2017	XBG02001	0.528
Sam has company over for a party. Tension is high between Sam and her daughter Max, who is dating Arturo, a man nearly twenty years her senior. Arturo was previously dating Macy, one of Sam's friends. Max eventually reveals to Sam that she is in over her head and wants to end the relationship, but is scared to. Near the end of the party, Sam takes Arturo outside and tells him his relationship with her daughter is over.
12	2	"Rising"	Pamela Adlon	Louis C.K.	September 21, 2017	XBG02002	0.492
Sam breaks up with a boyfriend she hates, snarling at him after he calls her out for mistreating him that she disliked him from their first date, but was "too nice" to break up with him. Later, Sam goes on a weekend trip with her friends to the fancy home of Sunny's new wealthy boyfriend. However, she leaves the party and instead goes to a beachside motel to be alone. She fantasizes about driving back home to get her daughters and bringing them to the beach.
13	3	"Robin"	Pamela Adlon	Pamela Adlon & Louis C.K.	September 28, 2017	XBG02005	0.498
Sam befriends Robin, a single father. Sam is asked by Robin to go with him for a weekend getaway to wine country and she leaves her obnoxious, squabbling kids behind as they whine about her. They have a nice time, but things get awkward when Sam requests they have separate rooms at the inn. Robin later apologizes for screwing things up and Sam still seems to like him.
14	4	"Sick"	Pamela Adlon	Pamela Adlon & Louis C.K.	October 5, 2017	XBG02006	0.377
Sam confides in Rich about her fear about her relationship with Robin; he's the perfect guy, but she's comfortable with being alone. Later, Sam's ex-husband unexpectedly stays over for dinner.
15	5	"Phil"	Pamela Adlon	Louis C.K.	October 12, 2017	XBG02007	0.520
After Phil injures herself and is hospitalized, Sam contemplates whether to put her into assisted living, but she eventually decides against it and to take care of her mother herself. Robin meets Sam's children for the first time as they go out to dinner. Later, Sam goes to meet her ex (Mather Zickel).
16	6	"Eulogy"	Pamela Adlon	Louis C.K.	October 19, 2017	XBG02003	0.502
Sam teaches an acting class and films a car commercial. Sam is upset at her children when they don't appreciate her work as an actor which has paid for their lifestyle. Sam has Max and Frankie eulogize her and tells them "I don't want to wait until I'm dead for my kids to appreciate me".
17	7	"Blackout"	Pamela Adlon	Pamela Adlon & Louis C.K.	October 26, 2017	XBG02009	0.414
After the electricity goes out in Sam's home, Jeff suggests that she get a generator in case the power goes out again. He drives her to the hardware store to buy one, and she ends up running into Robin and his daughter. Sam has stopped seeing Robin and hasn't called him; Robin tells Sam he misses her. On the way home, Jeff tries to kiss Sam, but she rejects him.
18	8	"Arnold Hall"	Pamela Adlon	Pamela Adlon & Louis C.K.	November 2, 2017	XBG02004	0.426
Arnold Hall, whose son is Sam's worthless ex-husband Xander, summons her for a visit. She gives Arnold a blunt evaluation when he asks her to keep supporting his son's "life of leisure" after her legal divorce payments expire late next year. She later goes to a bar mitzvah for Sunny's son Push where she gets even with Frankie for being verbally abusive, gives a great speech, and witnesses the unfriendly interplay between Sunny and her bitter sister.
19	9	"White Rock"	Pamela Adlon	Story by : Pamela Adlon & Louis C.K. Teleplay by : Louis C.K.	November 9, 2017	XBG02008	0.499
Sam takes her three children to White Rock, British Columbia to visit her uncle Lester (Phil's brother) and his wife Jarita. Sam learns family secrets, including discovering that she has an aunt she never knew about, who was put in an institution due to mental illness and seemingly forgotten by the family. Sam later learns that she died in 1983. Max converses with Jarita about her life in England; Frankie bonds with Lester over fishing and carpentry; and Duke sees a ghost.
20	10	"Graduation"	Pamela Adlon	Pamela Adlon & Louis C.K.	November 16, 2017	XBG02010	0.336
Sam, her family, and her closest friends celebrate Max's high school graduation. Max is devastated when her father doesn't show up. As their gift to Max, Sam, Frankie, Duke and Phil perform a dance routine of the song "Tilted".

=== Season 3 (2019) ===
No. overall	No. in season	Title	Directed by	Written by	Original release date	Prod. code	U.S. viewers (millions)
21	1	"Chicago"	Pamela Adlon	Pamela Adlon	February 28, 2019	XBG03001	0.450
While trying on clothes at home, Sam notices she has gained some weight. Sam goes with Max to Chicago as Max prepares for college; Max is both terrified and excited at the big changes ahead. On the flight home, Sam sees a ghost of her deceased father and makes friends with a passenger, Maneesh. After arriving home, Sam checks on Phil after she notices Phil's vehicle is damaged. At home, Duke also sees a vision of Sam's father. Sam helps Frankie with her homework for school, reading the play A Raisin in the Sun.
22	2	"Holding"	Pamela Adlon	Pamela Adlon & Ira Parker	March 7, 2019	XBG03002	0.353
During the night, Sam has hot flashes. Sam begins filming her new movie, Monsters in the Moonlight with Doug Jones in the hot Los Angeles weather. On set, Sam meets Mer Kodis, a talent manager. Sam gets a call from Max, who wants an off-campus apartment because she believes she is allergic to vinyl flooring. Duke receives a package from her estranged father, which contains a cellphone. Later, Sam attends a parent-child day at Duke's school where Sam has to deal with various obnoxious parents, including one whose son bullied Duke; Sam wants revenge.
23	3	"Nesting"	Pamela Adlon	Joe Hortua & Sarah Gubbins	March 14, 2019	XBG03003	0.337
Sam cooks a meal, and hosts a gathering of various friends at her home. Sam details the various problems regarding the filming of Monsters in the Moonlight. Mer tells Sam she's filing a grievance for an actor she manages, and wants to include Sam. Sam's manager Tressa warns Sam about Mer, that she's a "flipper" of straight women. Sam clarifies to Mer that she is straight. Sam and her brother Marion discuss their mother's declining mental stability; Marion believes she should be put in a nursing home, but Sam thinks she's fine and she accuses Marion of not being around to help and that she would be the one to take of her.
24	4	"Monsters in the Moonlight"	Pamela Adlon	Pamela Adlon & Sarah Gubbins	March 21, 2019	XBG03004	0.313
Sam has rape dreams about her ex-husband, much to her annoyance. Despite not being of legal age to drive, Sam gives Frankie driving lessons. Duke purposely loses the phone her father gave her after he doesn't call her when he promised to. Max returns home early from college, saying she isn't being challenged enough; Sam is frustrated that Max isn't trying hard enough. Sam continues filming Monsters in the Moonlight and after being involved in a stunt she believed was too dangerous, she chastises the director about the lack of safety concerns for herself and the rest of the actors. Sam goes out for a drink with Mer, and Mer makes it clear about her romantic interest in Sam.
25	5	"No Limit"	Pamela Adlon	Pamela Adlon & Joe Hortua	March 28, 2019	XBG03005	0.365
Sam visits her gynecologist and has an exam. Sam takes her daughters and their friends go-karting and she ends up injuring herself when she crashes, getting whiplash. Sam is frustrated by Frankie and Duke constantly arguing, so she lets them say whatever horrible thing they want to each other, but just for one minute. Everyone is shocked and amused by Duke's profanity. Sam goes to a birthday party with friends and various topics are discussed, including the difficulties of aging and parenting. The next day, Sam is feeling unwell, hungover from the previous night and the effects of whiplash. She visits her doctor and vents about all her problems – stressed out about her daughters, her mother's mental state, insomnia, and going through menopause – and she breaks down. The doctor recommends she see a psychotherapist.
26	6	"What Is Jeopardy?"	Pamela Adlon	Pamela Adlon & Ira Parker	April 4, 2019	XBG03006	0.418
Sam begins her therapy sessions with Dr. David Miller, who turns out to be a childhood friend from summer camp that she originally didn't recognize. Sam talks about the reasons for her anxiety and insomnia, stemming from her rape dreams about her ex-husband, Xander. As a way of getting Xander out of her head, Sam (after much deliberation) goes to his hotel room. Inside, they perform an "old routine" from their past involving Sam wearing high-heel boots and voyeurism from Xander. After they finish, Sam throws out the boots and leaves. Meanwhile, Phil accidentally knocks over Duke with her car when Duke is skateboarding in the driveway, but Phil plays it off as if everything is fine, worried what Sam will think. Phil then gives up her car keys to Marion. Later, Duke is feeling ill and bleeding, and Frankie realizes she is having her first period and helps her.
27	7	"Toilet"	Pamela Adlon	Pamela Adlon & Joe Hortua	April 11, 2019	XBG03007	0.274
Sam prepares for a colonoscopy and spends all day and night running to the bathroom. After the procedure, the doctor tells Sam she removed two polyps and that she may have a malignant polyp. Tired of her toilet constantly clogging, she gets an industrial-strength toilet installed. Sam has her last session with Dr. Miller; he realizes he should have recommend her to another therapist because of their past. After firing her as a patient, he tries to recreate a romantic moment from their past, but Sam leaves once the session is up. Sam is relieved when she gets a text from her doctor saying the test was negative.
28	8	"Easter"	Pamela Adlon	Sarah Gubbins & Robin Ruzan	April 18, 2019	XBG03008	0.364
Sam rents a motel room for Max and her friends for a photo shoot. Sam celebrates Easter morning with Duke and Frankie, giving them baskets of candy. Duke goes with Phil to her married boyfriend Walter's home for an Easter gathering and egg hunt. Walter's wife Esther has Alzheimer's and he introduces Phil as his friend, but his family sees through it. Phil tells Duke the hurtful truth about her father. When Marion arrives to pick them up, he demands Phil make a "statement of remorse" to him for her behavior over the years. Phil stays at the party and Marion drives Duke home. In the car, Marion cheers up Duke by telling her what a great mother Sam is. Phil finds Esther sitting alone in the TV room watching Easter Parade and Phil joins her when she starts singing.
29	9	"The Unknown"	Pamela Adlon	Sarah Gubbins	April 25, 2019	XBG03009	0.256
Sam attends a ceremony at the Friars Club which is honoring her late father Murray Fox. There, Sam converses with Durham, the son of Murray's old comedy partner. Sam and Durham flirt, but once his much younger girlfriend shows up, Sam chastises him for being with such a young girl and not seeking out women more age-appropriate. Sam goes to New York City to read for a play after being suggested by Mer. Sam reads for the play, alongside actors Mark Feuerstein, Holland Taylor, Gabrielle Ruiz, Jon Jon Briones and Norm Lewis. They then perform the play in front of an audience the next night and go out for drinks. Mer tells Sam that the play will be taken to Broadway and Sam wants to be involved. Sam wonders why her manager Tressa wasn't the one that set it up, although Sam stress her loyalty to Tressa. Sam and Tressa have a phone conversation discussing the issue, and Tressa feeling jealous of Mer, steps aside being her manager. Sam and Mer have a drink at the hotel bar and Mer shows her continued interest in Sam, but Sam denies having reciprocal feelings. At the bar with the rest of cast, Sam sends a text message to David Miller, who she has been communicating with after her therapy sessions ended.
30	10	"Show Me the Magic"	Pamela Adlon	Pamela Adlon & Ira Parker	May 2, 2019	XBG03010	0.342
Sam and her friends gather at Lala's house for a night of drinking and bonding. Sam and Tressa, who is no longer her manager, reconcile and remain great friends. When Lala's husband and his friend return home early from their night out, Sam becomes annoyed by their presence, that they've ruined the vibe of the great night the women have been having. The next morning, Duke is frightened and believes she sees her deceased grandfather Murray in her room. Sam goes to see David about the issue with Duke, and she wants him to pretend to be a medium to resolve the problem. However, David is offended by the suggestion. The two kiss before Sam leaves. Trying to solve the problem herself, Sam shows Duke various mementos of Murray, including various books he wrote and audio recordings. Duke takes the urn of Murray's ashes from Phil's house and puts them into a peanut butter and jelly sandwich. Sam discovers Duke's pet mouse has died and mourns it; and finds a bear in her driveway, learning that is the animal leaving its droppings in her driveway.
31	11	"Get Lit"	Pamela Adlon	Joe Hortua & Ira Parker	May 9, 2019	XBG03011	0.242
Sam has a medium brought to the house to deal with Murray's presence. Sam finds a cannabis smoking pipe in the house and yells at Max and her friends for leaving it out. Sam chaperones Frankie and her friends to a poetry slam event where they are performing; they perform a poem about "the little white lies we tell our little ones". Phil later smokes cannabis with Max's friends.
32	12	"Shake the Cocktail"	Pamela Adlon	Pamela Adlon	May 16, 2019	XBG03012	0.289
It's Sam's 50th birthday and Frankie has been gone from home for 8 days, living at her friend's house, caused by friction between her and Sam. Despite showing hostility toward Sam, Frankie is courteous to the families housing her and helps a homeless woman. Sam has lunch with Rich, but she becomes annoyed because he has invited his boyfriend. Rich gets mad and accuses her of wanting him to stay single, just like her. Sam talks with David about Frankie, and he suggests that she focus on Max and Duke. Phil talks with Sam on the phone, but forgets her birthday. Sam, Max, and Duke go to Frankie's recital, and Frankie has invited Rich and his boyfriend. Sam apologizes to Rich and they make amends; Rich gives her a birthday gift. They all then watch the performance and Max takes photographs. After, Frankie returns home and tells Sam she's not staying, but asks if she could use the bathtub. Sam gives her a meal and Frankie leaves a birthday card. Sam reads the card, which ends with "You have survived another year. You made it. We all made it." with P.S., stating "Sorry I'm such an asshole." Sam opens Rich's gift: a ring and a key inscribed with the word "peace". Max and Duke then present Sam with a cake and sing "Happy Birthday" to her.

=== Season 4 (2020) ===
No. overall	No. in season	Title	Directed by	Written by	Original release date	Prod. code	U.S. viewers (millions)
33	1	"Steady Rain"	Pamela Adlon	Pamela Adlon	March 5, 2020	XBG04001	0.302
Sam and Phil pick up Frankie and Duke from the airport after a trip visiting their father. Phil is now forced to wear a cardiac vest for a few months after previously suffering a heart attack. The next day, Frankie tells Sam she wants a big party for her 15th birthday, specifically a quinceañera, but Sam says they're "too Jewish" for that. Frankie states it's cultural appreciation and tells Sam she wants her father there too. Sam comforts a heartbroken Rich whose boyfriend broke up with him and Rich receives heartwarming advice from Duke that he'll find love again.
34	2	"She's Fifty"	Pamela Adlon	Pamela Adlon and Ira Parker	March 5, 2020	XBG04002	0.163
Sam's minivan is stolen from the mechanic's lot, and she is secretly happy about it. Sam goes to the gym with her friend Lenny whose husband just left her. Sam learns from Tressa, who is now her former manager, that they are rebooting Ching of the Mill (a reference to King of the Hill which Adlon starred in) and has to audition for the role she voiced on the original series. Sam uses an electric car from the dealership as a loaner and when it runs out of electricity, she walks to a gas station with a mechanic on hand. She ends up buying an El Camino from him. Sam drives home and discovers her children have bought a chinchilla with her credit card and she wants the animal to be returned. At the pet store, Sam gets a call and finds out she didn't get the part and is left disappointed. The pet store doesn't allow returns on pets, so they keep the chinchilla and Sam also buys a white snake and Sam announces to Max, "welcome to my midlife crisis!"
35	3	"Escape Drill"	Pamela Adlon	Pamela Adlon and Ira Parker	March 12, 2020	XBG04003	0.496
Sam takes her two friends, Lenny and Lala, to meet with her ex-husband's lawyer, as they're both in the middle of getting a divorce from their husbands. Lala is ready, but Lenny is pushing back on the idea. Duke and her friend try on makeup and Duke expresses her insecurities about her body. Sam calls Jeff over to help assemble a cage for their chinchilla. Jeff is in the process of making amends as part of a twelve-step program and apologizes for things he has done to Sam. Jeff's ex-wife Sunny comes over and he goes over his long list of amends to her. After getting manicures and pedicures, Sam and Max go shopping and help a mother find their lost child in the store. Sam gets a call from her new manager Mal and learns she has a new gig with Jessica Barden. After arriving home, Sam walks into Frankie's room and is shocked to find her in bed with a boy, one that isn't Frankie's best friend Jason.
36	4	"DNA"	Pamela Adlon	Ira Parker	March 19, 2020	XBG04004	0.268
Sam, at the piano, struggles with an Elton John song, then shows up at Phil's house with a DNA test kit and tells her "It's today... give me your spit!" Sam goes to the doctor for her chronic hand pain and the doctor tells her, "Your hands are much older than you are." Sam's muscles have atrophied, and not even surgery can fix it. The next morning, Sam wakes up to an owl in her bed. Duke walks into the room with a towel and collects it. Sam then calls Animal Control to retrieve it. Sam lets Duke and her friend Pepper start her El Camino, and Duke accidentally slams the door on Pepper's hand, causing her to lose a fingertip. Duke begins to laugh uncontrollably while Sam rushes to help a terrified and screaming Pepper. Max is mad at Sam that her dress for work wasn't washed. Sam calls her out for being "super shitty" to her, that she lives at home rent-free, and could at least help around the house. Max tells Sam that she doesn't have to be so hard on her just because "you don't know what it's like to be a woman anymore." Sam then calls Max a "cunt". They then have a back-and-forth of calling each other the c-word. They eventually become exhausted and break down, smiling and laughing. Max apologizes and they hug. Sam tells Max while she doesn't want her to move out, that she still needs to. Max realizes that Sam will have to watch three kids move out.
37	5	"Carbonara"	Pamela Adlon	Patricia Resnick	March 26, 2020	XBG04005	0.351
Sam wakes up to find that the constant rain in Los Angeles has exacerbated leaking issues in her house. Sam places pots around the house to catch the rain. Sam goes into the kitchen and Frankie is making carbonara. Sam tells her that they need to have "the talk" regarding Frankie being in bed with a boy. Frankie urges Sam to use the Hinge profile she made for her so she doesn't end up alone. Sam takes Duke to her ballet class and the instructor forces her to choose between ballet and soccer. Duke eventually chooses ballet after the instructor makes her feel insecure about her body. Sam hires a married "handy-couple" to fix the various issues around the house, including the leaks. Sam takes Frankie to her first gynaecology exam. On the way home, Frankie shows Sam all the "likes" she has on Hinge and they go to Pinkberry.
38	6	"New Orleans"	Pamela Adlon	Joe Hortua	April 2, 2020	XBG04006	0.283
Sam travels to New Orleans to the attend the wedding between Maneesh and his boyfriend Andrew. Sam accompanies them to their wedding brunch with their two families, but they are denied access because they do not meet the male dress code of wearing a collared dress shirt. While Maneesh and Andrew shop for new shirts, Sam runs into one of her exes with his new girlfriend, but they pretend not to know each other. At the wedding ceremony, Sam speaks with a woman who explains how much better her life is after moving to New Orleans. Sam again runs into her ex at the wedding as his girlfriend knows Andrew. The two finally explain that they know each other. Sam makes a toast and tells the story of how she meet Maneesh on a plane ride where the cockpit caught on fire and they had to make an emergency landing. Sam spends another day in New Orleans and explores the city and its culture: she goes to a Voodoo shop and drinks a potion; eats crawfish boils; and takes part in a second line parade. After, Sam visits a realtor and expresses interest in buying a home. At night, Sam goes to a jazz club to watch live music. Sam again runs into her ex there (without his girlfriend) and they walk the streets of New Orleans.
39	7	"High man. Bye man."	Pamela Adlon	Pamela Adlon and Joe Hortua	April 9, 2020	XBG04007	0.287
An emotional Sam picks up Duke who has just graduated from elementary school. Sam, Phil, and Max go to a housewarming party for Sam's brother Marion and his wife Caroline who have just bought a home in Los Angeles. Things are awkward and tense between Phil and Caroline. Sam asks Marion about his marriage, believing there are issues, but Marion says they are working through it. Because Sam is unable to get surgery on her hand, she goes to a dispensary to buy medical cannabis for the pain. Sam ends up smoking too much and has to call Max to pick up Duke from a sleepover she wants to leave. Sam, recovering from her high, lies in bed with her three daughters as they watch a movie. Later, Frankie reveals to Sam that she has lost her virginity, telling her "she just wanted to get it out of the way" and have it be her choice. Frankie then makes Sam peppermint ice cream which they enjoy together on the balcony.
40	8	"Father's Day"	Pamela Adlon	Patricia Resnick and Robin Ruzan	April 16, 2020	XBG04008	0.353
Sam and her girlfriends including Sunny, Lenny, Lala, Tressa, and Chaya get together for a Father's Day brunch that doubles as a thorough and painful reminder of their marriages' dissolutions. Sam's ex-husband Xander lingers over the meeting, as Sam flashes back to how his bizarre, controlling mother ruined their plans for an amicable divorce and that she's been paying for it ever since. Sam gets mad at Sunny because she and her ex-husband Jeff are doing well as amicable exes, and Sam also is her usual unpleasant self to Lala's ex Thomas, who in turn points out all the ways Sam doesn't know what she's talking about and snidely remarks how she's becoming old, brittle and mean. Sam and her friends later write "forgiveness" letters to their exes, but Sam is clearly not ready to forgive Xander. Phil takes Frankie out to dinner and gives her both an early birthday gift and some hard truths about Frankie's grandfather. Max and Frankie take over advising Duke and leave Sam out of the loop.
41	9	"Batceañera"	Pamela Adlon	Joe Hortua and Ira Parker	April 23, 2020	XBG04009	0.251
Sam throws a party that is part bat mitzvah and quinceañera–for the 15th birthdays of Frankie and the daughter of a Spanish family Sam is friends with. The party is attended by numerous friends and family members. When Sam's ex-husband Xander shows up, things become tense as Sam is sickened he is there but Frankie is happy he showed up. Sunny tells Sam she needs to let go of her anger regarding Xander and to move on, advice Sam isn't keen on. Frankie makes a speech that thanks Sam for being a single mother and raising her and is happy that Xander choose to attend. Xander then makes a kind speech about Frankie but embarrasses himself when he incorrectly congratulates her on turning 16. Rich and Jeff both give Xander a piece of their mind: Rich makes it clear he's more of a father to Sam's daughters than Xander has ever been, and Jeff levels Xander by pointing out Jeff has been the completely despised person that Xander is now and he worked hard to mend fences with the people he'd let down. Xander then talks with Sam about how much he enjoyed the party with his family and apologizes for not being around more. Sam invites Xander to come for dinner with the girls later in the week. The next day, Sam visits Max at her job at the restaurant where she is a hostess and Sam proudly watches her. Sam sits at the bar and talks with the chef/owner, who praises Max.
42	10	"Listen to the Roosters"	Pamela Adlon	Pamela Adlon	April 30, 2020	XBG04010	0.186
Sam takes Duke and her friend to a Los Angeles Dodgers game, enjoying the fireworks but not being too happy that a Presidential visit has gridlocked the traffic all around the stadium. With help from a friendly Mexican security guard and then a ride-share driver whose two rules are "you have to smile and you have to sing", the trip home becomes a blast, though Duke is left feeling uncertain about what happened when she has a nice talk with a pretty, elderly woman who seemingly vanishes. Sam works on a TV story where she interviews women about their menstrual periods and then about the trials and joys of being a woman in society. The next day, Sam's ex-husband Xander comes by for dinner, only to find that Max, Frankie, and Duke have gone off together to the beach. Xander is treated with deserved contempt by Phil and later by Rich, as Rich lets him know that it wasn't an accident that the girls weren't there as part of a "test" to see if Xander would be his usual no-show self. Xander asks Sam for his usual alimony payment, but Sam tells him it is different: she's bundling all of the money she owes to him into a single check, and she took out a bank loan to pay for it because she would rather owe a bank than Xander. She says they have a clean slate now, and she's forgiving him–not because she likes him now, but for the good of herself, her life and "my daughters". Xander leaves and is later humiliated when he sees the check has the company heading "Xander Hall Is A Loser Who Abandoned His Kids, LLC". Sam, Phil, and Rich enjoy night-swimming at the neighbor's pool. The season ends with the Fox daughters sitting on the beach and then looking at the camera as the ocean breaks behind them.

=== Season 5 (2022) ===
No. overall	No. in season	Title	Directed by	Written by	Original release date	Prod. code	U.S. viewers (millions)
43	1	"F*ck Anatoly's Mom"	Pamela Adlon	Pamela Adlon	February 28, 2022	XBG05001	0.182
Sam meets with Max, who has since moved out, to co-sign for her new studio apartment, but Sam learns her credit score is too low to co-sign. Meanwhile, Duke is spending time with her father. Sam and her brother Marion, along with his wife Caroline (much to Sam's dismay), go to their genealogy test results to learn about their family history. They are told most of their Jewish ancestors were executed by the Nazis and that their grandfather (Phil's father) is not actually their biological grandfather. Sam goes to Phil's house, who is cleaning up and getting rid of her old mementos as she has no use for them anymore. Phil is not surprised by the news about her biological father. Sam finds her baseball card collection and insists Phil has to keep everything until she goes through it herself. Rich tells Sam he wants to try and get back his ex, Alan. Sam and Frankie go to a celebration dinner with Frankie's friend who got admitted to Harvard and his mother. Back at home, the power goes out and after the generator kicks in, Sam accidentally knocks over the statue at the top of stairs (the one Sam and her daughters always touch when walking past it) and it falls onto the floor and smashes into pieces, leaving Sam shocked.
44	2	"Rip Taylor's Cell Phone"	Pamela Adlon	Joe Hortua & Ryan Raimann	February 28, 2022	XBG05002	0.132
Sam picks up Frankie and her friend Jason who are both working at a grocery store. While waiting outside, Sam meets Marty Krofft and finds a lost cell phone. Inside the car, they hear gunshots from a robbery nearby. Sam learns that Phil was scammed out of $7,000 by someone pretending to be Max and that Phil and the girls have been hiding this information from her. Sam goes to her costume fitting for a period film she has been cast in. During the uncomfortable costume fitting, Sam realizes she is no longer interested in the project. Sam runs in to Ron Cephas Jones, who offers her a directing job on a series he is producing. Sam calls her agent to get her off the film. Sam prepares dinner for a night with her daughters and to watch the finale of a show, however, Max is unable to come and Frankie and Jason have plans for the night, leaving Sam disappointed. Sam returns the lost cell phone to a TaskRabbit employee and is elated to learn from her agent that she is indeed off the film.
45	3	"Oh, I'm Not Gonna Tell Her"	Pamela Adlon	Joe Hortua & Judy Gold	March 7, 2022	XBG05003	0.171
Max is accompanied by Rich after getting an abortion at Planned Parenthood. Max tells Rich she does not plan on telling anyone else, including her mom, though Rich insists she does. Sam volunteers for a program called Los Angeles Reads where she reads a book to a class of young students. While there, Sam speaks with fellow actors Kevin Michael Richardson and Danny Trejo, who are also volunteering. Duke is dropped off at home by her father after their vacation together. Xander ends up staying and cooking dinner for his three daughters. Frankie and Max both chastise Duke for texting with an older man online. After learning Xander has been at her house, Sam goes to vent to Sunny and discovers that she and her ex Jeff are sleeping together again, which amuses her. Sam returns home and is happy to find all her daughters there along with Rich. Sam tells Frankie to throw out her baseball card collection. Duke shows Sam a gift that Xander left–a small skull, a new ward for the top of the stairs–but Sam hates it and has Rich dispose of it.
46	4	"Ephemera"	Pamela Adlon	Pamela Adlon and Joe Hortua	March 14, 2022	XBG05004	0.131
Max, Frankie, and Duke help Phil reconnect with an old crush via Facebook. Marion gives advice to Sam about her finances and he suggests that Phil should move into a condo and that Sam should also sell her home because she does not need all that space anymore. Duke goes shopping with her friend Pepper for a birthday gift for her mom, but Pepper becomes annoyed with Duke, who is disconnected and uninterested. Duke tells Pepper about all her insecurities, her lack of connection, and that she thinks her sisters are perfect, while she is not. Sam and Frankie go on a graveyard tour of celebrities and they also visit Sam's father's grave. Sam learns about proper pronoun use by Frankie. Sam asks Frankie about their preferred pronouns, but Frankie is not interested in a label. Max moves back into the house after not being able to make it on her own, but Sam happily welcomes her back.
47	5	"World is Mean Right Now"	Pamela Adlon	Ariel Leve and Ryan Raimann	March 21, 2022	XBG05005	0.116
Sam makes borscht to bring to Phil's house for a family dinner with her daughters. Things get tense when Phil takes out a photo album which include pictures of Sam's wedding day, which brings back painful memories for her. Frankie ends up offending Sam and she leaves Phil's house, while Duke accosts them for their behavior. Sam goes to her doctor for a check-up after struggling while exercising, but she is told she is healthy. Sam has a feng shui consultation as a gift from one of her friends, but she tells him she cannot make any the changes he suggests. Sam tells Phil she will be going to San Francisco for work and Phil tries to tag along, which annoys Sam and says that Phil puts too much pressure on her. They eventually reconcile and Phil decides not to go. In the morning, Frankie makes Sam a seaweed smoothie and apologizes for her behavior the previous night. Frankie also gives Sam the money she got for selling her baseball card collection, but kept one of the Hank Aaron cards for sentimental value. While exercising outside on stairs, Sam converses with a crying man and they eventually laugh together.
48	6	"San Francisco"	Pamela Adlon	R. Eric Thomas and Joe Hortua	March 28, 2022	XBG05006	0.237
Sam goes to San Francisco to guest direct an episode of a television show produced and starring Ron Cephas Jones. Sam has trouble directing one of the child actors and Ron gets angry at her when she gives him a note on his performance. Ron later apologizes for his behavior and they talk about all the previous times they have worked together. The show's creator, Elijah, tells Sam she wanted her to direct because she was one of her inspirations as a kid. With Sam gone, Max is in control of the household and realizes how tough it is to be in charge. Max later scolds Duke for vaping and tells her to fix her friendship with Pepper, who has been staying with them. Max takes both out them out of house and they go to a record store and to the park. After finishing work, Sam goes to a bar and is given a drink, and discovers it is from Phil, who has come to San Francisco anyway. Sam hesitates taking the drink or acknowledging Phil, but she eventually goes up to her and Phil begins to tell Sam about her day.
49	7	"Family Meeting"	Pamela Adlon	Judy Gold & R. Eric Thomas and Pamela Adlon	April 4, 2022	XBG05007	0.113
Sam calls a family meeting after she becomes fed up with her daughters constantly being on their phones. Sam takes their phones and suggests they go a week without using them. Rich and Alan are back together. Frankie and her friends get ready to go out to a party. Sam still does not know about Max's abortion and while Max and Rich discuss it, Duke overhears the conversation. Rich strongly chastises Duke for vaping and throws the device away. One of Frankie's friends, Jay, tells Sam that Frankie has been his "girlfriend" to hide that he is gay from his parents. Sam senses Rich is hiding a secret regarding Max, and Rich eventually reveals the truth about her abortion. Sam is hurt that Max could not tell her. During dinner, Frankie's friend and Jay's boyfriend reveals that Jason is their deadname and they are now "Jerza". Max comes home drunk and crawls into bed with Sam. Max tells Sam how much she loves her and that she does not want her to die.
50	8	"Jesus Saves"	Pamela Adlon	R. Eric Thomas & Cree Summer and Joe Hortua	April 11, 2022	XBG05008	0.210
The extended Fox family have a virtual funeral service over Zoom for Uncle Harold. Sam gets her British dual citizenship. Sam begins to prepare for their trip to England by collecting her children's passports and packing, which starts to overwhelm her. Several of Sam's friends stop by the house, including Lenny and her brother Cope, along with his overly-touchy girlfriend, which annoys Sam. Tressa and Chaya show up next as they will be the ones looking after Sam's dogs when they are away. Frankie comforts Max after she breaks down crying when Max says "I don't know who I am". Sam, her children, and Phil, along with Marion and his wife (who are in first class) board a plane to England. Sam is stuck in a middle seat and deals with an annoyed passenger who is angry over a crying child. The flight experiences turbulence which frightens Frankie and Duke, but Phil is able to calm them down.
51	9	"England"	Pamela Adlon	Joe Hortua	April 18, 2022	XBG05009	0.112
The Fox's family trip starts in Liverpool where they meet one of their cousins, Gabby, and Phil's friend Ben with whom she recently reconnected with. Max and Gabby bond over their love of art and Gabby's admiration of Max's photography. Caroline and Marion have come to London to spread the ashes of her mother–which was the original intention of the trip–but Marion invited everyone else along and paid for it. Everyone goes to a pub and Duke gets her first taste of beer. In London, the family visits various stores and shops. Phil reveals to Max that she had an abortion in the 1950s. Phil insists on buying a Jewish music box for Sam, and says they can play it once a year as a new tradition, but Sam refuses. Sam and Phil have drinks at the hotel bar and Sam questions Phil's relationship with Ben, whether it's sexual or not. But Phil says it's just companionship. After too many drinks, Sam takes a tumble down the stairs and Phil puts her to bed. In the morning, Phil and Max reveal to Sam they both intend to stay in England. Max wants to make a change in her life and says she can live with Gabby. The family then goes to spread Caroline's mother's ashes in the river. Phil later notices Caroline dump some of the ashes in a nearby porta-potty. Duke has a vision of Phil with her brother Lester and then of them as children walking in the park. In the evening at the hotel bar, Sam toasts everyone and announces Phil and Max's plans to stay. Marion talks to Sam about their mother staying in England. Phil sings "Now Is the Hour" while a man plays piano. At the airport, Sam is seen with the Jewish music box and learns their flight is delayed.
52	10	"We Are Not Alone"	Pamela Adlon	Pamela Adlon	April 25, 2022	XBG05010	0.137
Sam is visited at home by Caroline, who tells Sam how much she dislikes being around Phil because she reminds her of her own mother and that they did not have a good relationship. Caroline admits she wishes she could be more like Sam. Sam is gifted a new piece of sculpture for the top of stairs from Caroline. Sam gets her period again, which surprises her since she is middle-aged. Sam, Duke, and Pepper release Duke's fish into the lake, but are fined by the park ranger for doing so. Sam recognizes the man as the current owner of her childhood home. The man invites Sam over for a visit to see the home. Various friends and family of Sam's gather at her home for the wedding of Sunny and Jeff–who have decided to remarry. Sam, who got ordained, hosts the ceremony and marries the two. Later in the evening, Sam gives the Jewish music box to Marion. Duke tells Sam that she is a good person. In England, Max attends a Buddhist art seminar. Sam creates a For Sale sign for Phil's house and places it in the yard. Sam has a video call with Phil, who is working at Ben's pub. During the call, Sam realizes she is truly happy. In a fourth wall break, the various characters sing "Always Look on the Bright Side of Life" as Sam drives in her El Camino during a meteor shower and winks at the camera before driving off.

== Reception ==
=== Critical response ===
The series received an overall score of 98% on Rotten Tomatoes and 88% on Metacritic.

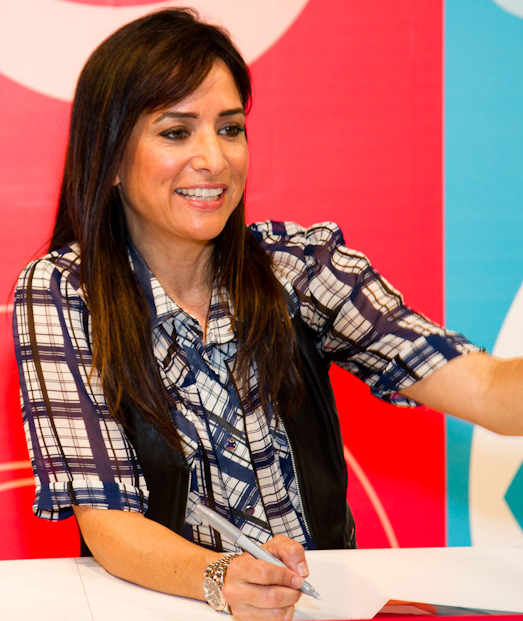
Pamela Adlon has received significant praise for her acting, writing, and directing, with critics citing her as one of TV's best auteurs.

The first season has a Metacritic score of 80 out of 100 based 32 reviews. Rotten Tomatoes gave the first season a 95% score, with an average rating of 8.2 out of 10 based on 58 critic reviews, with the critical consensus "Pamela Adlon's Better Things abstains from traditional sitcom sendups and forges a path all its own – in this bawdy, often hilarious and bittersweet ode to the daily highs and lows of being a single mother."

The second season has a Metacritic score of 96 out of 100 based on 13 reviews. On Rotten Tomatoes, it has a 96% approval rating with an average rating of 9.2 out of 10 based on 27 reviews, with the critical consensus "Better Things' second season plays even more adroitly to its strengths, weaving confidently between stinging humor, caustic observation, and poignant drama". In his review for Time, Daniel D'Addario wrote, "This is a huge leap forward for a show that was already quite strong. Adlon comes as close to a pure auteur as TV gets. That her story is one imbued with both sadness and light makes Better Things one of television's very best shows—in any genre." Better Things is ranked as the seventh best TV series of 2017, according to Metacritic's list which tallies "best of" lists from various major TV critics and publications.

The third season has a Metacritic score of 94 out of 100 based on 19 reviews. On Rotten Tomatoes, it has a 100% approval rating with an average rating of 9.3 out of 10 based on 37 reviews with the critical consensus, "Pamela Adlon fully asserts her authorial voice over Better Things in a triumphant third season that examines the exhaustion of motherhood with exhilarating artistry." Matt Zoller Seitz of Vulture wrote, "Better Things is the best the show has ever been." Caroline Framke of Variety wrote, "Better Things feels a bit freer to be its most audacious self this season. Making the show under extraordinary pressure has, in the end, allowed Adlon to throw up her hands, say anything she wants, get it all out there and succeed entirely on her own terms."

The fourth season has a Metacritic score of 90 out of 100 based on six reviews. On Rotten Tomatoes, it has a 100% approval rating with an average rating of 8.7 out of 10 based on 22 reviews with the critical consensus, "Sharp and singular, Better Things just keeps getting better." Dan Fienberg of The Hollywood Reporter called the series "still one of the very best things on TV". Ben Travers of IndieWire gave it an "A" grade and summarized that season 4 is "an experience like nothing else on television".

The fifth season has a Metacritic score of 93 out of 100 based on 14 reviews. On Rotten Tomatoes, it has a 100% approval rating with an average rating of 8.8 out of 10 based on 23 reviews with the critical consensus, "Bittersweet, funny as ever, and brimming with wisdom, Better Things's final sendoff is as good as it gets." Jen Chaney of Vulture called it "one of the most generous, organic, and beautiful works of the past decade".

=== Accolades ===
Year	Ceremony	Category	Nominee(s)	Result	Ref.
2016	Critics' Choice Television Awards	Most Exciting New Series	Better Things	Won	
2016	Satellite Awards	Best Actress in a Series, Comedy or Musical	Pamela Adlon	Nominated	
2016	Peabody Award	Entertainment Programming	Better Things	Won	
2017	Gotham Independent Film Awards	Breakthrough Series – Long Form	Better Things	Nominated	
2017	Primetime Emmy Awards	Outstanding Lead Actress in a Comedy Series	Pamela Adlon	Nominated	
2017	TCA Awards	Individual Achievement in Comedy	Pamela Adlon	Nominated	
2017	Writers Guild of America Awards	New Series	Pamela Adlon, Louis C.K., Cindy Chupack and Gina Fattore	Nominated	
2017	Hollywood Music in Media Awards	Outstanding Music Supervision – Television	Nora Felder	Nominated	
2018	Golden Globe Awards	Best Performance in a Television Series – Musical or Comedy	Pamela Adlon	Nominated	
2018	TCA Awards	Individual Achievement in Comedy	Pamela Adlon	Nominated	
2018	Primetime Emmy Awards	Outstanding Lead Actress in a Comedy Series	Pamela Adlon	Nominated	
2019	TCA Awards	Individual Achievement in Comedy	Pamela Adlon	Nominated	
2020	American Cinema Editors Awards	Best Edited Comedy Series for Commercial Television	Janet Weinberg	Won	
2020	Casting Society of America	Television Series – Comedy	Felicia Fasano and Samantha Rood	Nominated	
2020	TCA Awards	Outstanding Achievement in Comedy	Better Things	Nominated	
2020	TCA Awards	Individual Achievement in Comedy	Pamela Adlon	Nominated	
2020	Gracie Allen Awards	Comedy	Better Things	Won	
2021	Critics' Choice Television Awards	Best Comedy Series	Better Things	Nominated	
2021	Critics' Choice Television Awards	Best Actress in a Comedy Series	Pamela Adlon	Nominated	
2021	Hollywood Music in Media Awards	Best Music Supervision – Television	Nora Felder and Heather Guibert	Nominated	
2022	TCA Awards	Individual Achievement in Comedy	Pamela Adlon	Nominated	
2022	Hollywood Critics Association TV Awards	Best Cable Series, Comedy	Better Things	Nominated	
2022	Hollywood Critics Association TV Awards	Best Actress in a Broadcast Network or Cable Series, Comedy	Pamela Adlon	Nominated	
2022	Hollywood Critics Association TV Awards	Best Directing in a Broadcast Network or Cable Series, Comedy (for "We Are Not Alone")	Pamela Adlon	Nominated	
2023	Critics' Choice Television Awards	Best Comedy Series	Better Things	Nominated	
