= Between Us (2012 film) =

- Directed by: Dan Mirvish
- Written by: Joe Hortua; Dan Mirvish
- Based on: Between Us by Joe Hortua
- Produced by: Hans C. Ritter; Mike S. Ryan; Dan Mirvish
- Starring: Taye Diggs; Melissa George; David Harbour; Julia Stiles
- Cinematography: Nancy Schreiber
- Edited by: Dean Gonzalez
- Music by: Tobias Enhus; H. Scott Salinas
- Production company: Bugeater Filmed Entertainment
- Distributed by: Monterey Media
- Release dates: September 13, 2012 (Oldenburg International Film Festival); June 21, 2013 (United States)
- Running time: 90 minutes
- Country: United States
- Language: English
- Budget: $40,000

Between Us is a 2012 American drama film directed by Dan Mirvish and written by Mirvish and Joe Hortua, based on Hortua's 2004 stage play. It stars Taye Diggs, Melissa George, David Harbour, and Julia Stiles.

== Cast ==
- Taye Diggs as Carlo
- Melissa George as Sharyl
- David Harbour as Joel
- Julia Stiles as Grace
- Mara New as Bridesmaid
- Julia Cho as Guest
- Claudio Dabed as The Brazilian

== Release ==
The film had its world premiere at the Oldenburg International Film Festival. Monterey Media acquired all U.S. and Canadian rights to the film in April 2013 and plans on a summer theatrical release. The American theatrical release began on June 21, 2013 in Los Angeles at the Downtown Independent Theater.

=== Festivals ===
'Between Us' won the grand jury prize at the 2012 Bahamas International Film Festival, and was the Closing Night Film at the 50th Annual Gijón International Film Festival in Spain.

'Between Us' was selected to screen at the following film festivals:

- 2012 Bahamas International Film Festival
- 2012 Hamptons International Film Festival
- 2012 Slamdance Film Festival
- 2012 Whistler Film Festival.
- 2012 Atlanta Film Festival
- 2012 Ashland Independent Film Festival
- 2012 Indie Memphis Film Festival
- 2013 Dallas International Film Festival
- 2013 Sarasota Film Festival

== Reception ==
Richard Rushfield of BuzzFeed described the film as "a powerful, brilliantly acted character piece about two couples who meet over the course of several years to serially rip out the loose threads of their relationships. The four-person cast of Julia Stiles, Taye Diggs, Melissa George, and David Harbour (Elliot of The Newsroom) give the sense of breathing in their parts so deeply that they are at every move haunted by their characters' secrets and torn by rival pulls of love and contempt toward the other characters. No corner of intimacy or secrets is left unexposed in the film that is at once hilarious and devastating."
