= Paradox Lake =

- Directed by: Przemyslaw Reut
- Written by: Przemyslaw Reut; Wieslaw Saniewski
- Produced by: Ken Kushner; Przemyslaw Reut
- Starring: Matt Wolf; Jessica Fuchs
- Cinematography: Przemyslaw Reut
- Edited by: Przemyslaw Reut
- Music by: Maciej Staniecki
- Release date: January 2002 (Sundance)
- Running time: 85 minutes
- Countries: Poland; United States
- Languages: English; Polish

Paradox Lake is a 2002 Polish-American drama film directed by Przemyslaw Reut and starring Matt Wolf and Jessica Fuchs.

== Cast ==
- Phe Caplan as Rachel
- Jessica Fuchs as Jessica
- John Gelin as Buddha
- Ernie Jurez as Ernie
- Daniel Luciano as Dr. Olson
- Jason Miller
- Beata Tyszkiewicz as Family Doctor
- Matt Wolf as Matt

== Accolade ==
At the 18th Independent Spirit Awards, Reut won the Someone to Watch Award.
