= 36 Saints =

2013 film directed by Eddy Duran

- Film poster
- Directed by: Eddy Duran
- Written by: Jeffrey De Serrano; Joey Dedio
- Produced by: Joey Dedio
- Starring: Franky G Donna McKechnie; Britne Oldford
- Cinematography: Isidro Urquia
- Edited by: Jim Mol
- Production company: Active Fox Productions
- Release date: September 6, 2013
- Running time: 81 minutes
- Country: United States
- Language: English

36 Saints is a 2013 American thriller film directed by Eddy Duran and starring Franky G, Jeffrey De Serrano (who also co-wrote the screenplay), Donna McKechnie, Jaime Tirelli and Britne Oldford.

== Cast ==
- Franky G as Joseph Reyes
- Jeffrey De Serrano as Michael Montoya
- Britne Oldford as Eve
- Donna McKechnie as Miss L
- Tyrone Brown as Valentine
- Matthew Daddario as Sebastian
- Aja Naomi King as Joan
- Chris Riggi as Dominic
- Alesandra Assante as Maria
- Jaime Tirelli as Father Judas Neri
- Laverne Cox as Genesuis

== Reception ==
Metacritic, which uses a weighted average, assigned the film a score of 19 out of 100, based on 4 critics, indicating "generally unfavorablle reviews".

On The New York Times, Andy Webster wrote that its is "a modest effort only fitfully attaining its aims." On Variety, Geoff Berkshire wrote that "this confused and confusing pic delivers no thrills, chills or anything remotely surprising."
