= Bayou Caviar =

- Directed by: Cuba Gooding Jr.
- Written by: Eitan Gorlin; Cuba Gooding Jr.
- Produced by: Anjul Nigam; Steve Straka; Hilary Shor; Eric Colley
- Starring: Famke Janssen; Richard Dreyfuss; Cuba Gooding Jr.; Lia Marie Johnson; Ken Lerner
- Cinematography: Wedigo von Schultzendorff
- Edited by: Keith Reamer
- Music by: Jeffery Alan Jones
- Production companies: Brittany House Pictures; Quixotic Road; Detente613; Fireshoe Productions; Major Motion Pictures
- Distributed by: Gravitas Ventures
- Release date: October 5, 2018
- Country: United States
- Language: English

Bayou Caviar is a 2018 American neo-noir drama film directed by Cuba Gooding Jr. and written by Eitan Gorlin and Gooding. The film stars Gooding, Famke Janssen, Richard Dreyfuss, with Gregg Bello, Ken Lerner, Sam Thakur, Katharine McPhee, and Lia Marie Johnson in supporting roles. Russian hockey player Alexei Kovalev makes an appearance in the film. This film marks Gooding's first time as director.

== Plot ==
Rodney (Gooding) is a former boxing star reduced to working as a bouncer, a job that eventually brings him into contact with Yuri (Dreyfuss), a Russian gangster whose preferred method for the disposal of dead bodies is in the form of "bayou caviar," which is food left to the alligators in the Louisiana swamps.

Rodney’s task is to provide compromising evidence on the son-in-law of the gangster’s business associate, a blackmail scheme that if executed properly, could rebound to the benefit of several people, including a fame-hungry teenager Kat (Lia Marie Johnson) and lesbian photographer Nic (Famke Janssen).

== Cast ==
- Cuba Gooding Jr. as Rodney Jones
- Famke Janssen as Nic
- Richard Dreyfuss as Yuri
- Gregg Bello as Isaac
- Ken Lerner as Shlomo
- Sam Thakur as Rafi
- Katharine McPhee as Shelly
- Lia Marie Johnson as Kat
- Kedrick Brown as Emmanuel Johnson
- James Moses Black as Sasha

== Filming ==
Principal photography began on June 19, 2017.

== Reception ==
On review aggregator website Rotten Tomatoes, 20% of five critics gave the film a positive review. Metacritic, which uses a weighted average, assigned the film a score of 36 out of 100, based on four critics, indicating "generally unfavorable" reviews.
