= Joe Hortua =

American screenwriter (born 1971)

- Born: June 17, 1971 (age 55); Chicago, Illinois, U.S.
- Education: University of Iowa, New York University
- Occupations: Playwright, screenwriter, producer
- Children: 2
- Writing career
- Period: 1997-present

Joe Hortua is an American playwright, screenwriter, and producer. He has most recently worked as an Executive Producer and Writer on the Emmy nominated television show Better Things on FX. Hortua has written such plays as Other Parents, Making It, and Between Us which have been performed at the Manhattan Theatre Club and South Coast Repertory Theater. He is married with two children.

== Early life ==
Born and raised in the Chicago suburb of Morton Grove, Hortua attended Niles West High School and graduated from the University of Iowa in 1993. While in college, Hortua was a Division I walk-on swimmer. He was born to a Colombian father and a Spanish mother and was the first member of his extended family to earn a college degree. Subsequently, Hortua went on to graduate school at New York University receiving his MFA in playwriting and screenwriting in 1997. While at NYU, he studied under Tony Kushner, who in 2003 referred to Hortua as one of his favorite young playwrights.

== Career ==
Hortua began his career as a playwright in New York City after graduating from NYU. His play Making It was commissioned by South Coast Repertory Theatre in 2002. The play was inspired by his years working at Lumi, an Italian eatery on Manhattan's Upper East Side. Hortua began his television career in 2008 as a story editor on Life. He went on to staff on the shows Betrayal, Backstrom, Bones, The Night Shift, Home Before Dark and Little America. He most recently worked as an Executive Producer on Better Things for FX. Hortua has also written television pilots for the FX, Showtime, FOX, Lionsgate and CW network.

In theatre, Hortua has written such plays as Other Parents, Making It, and Between Us, which have been performed at the Manhattan Theatre Club and South Coast Repertory Theater. Between Us was translated into Hebrew and performed at the Be’er Theatre in Israel, and subsequently produced in 2010 at the Ensemble Theatre in Australia. In 2008, the play was published by Dramatists Play Service. The screen adaptation of Between Us premiered in 2012 with stars Julia Stiles, Taye Diggs, David Harbour and Melissa George in the leading roles.

== Filmography ==
Film
Title	Year	Role
Between Us	2012	Screenplay, Producer

Television
Title	Year(s)	Role
Life	2008–2009	Writer
Leverage	2011–2012	Writer
Betrayal	2013–2014	Writer, Co-Producer
Backstrom	2015	Writer, Co-Producer
Bones	2015–2017	Writer, Supervising Producer
The Night Shift	2017	Writer, Supervising Producer
Better Things	2019–2022	Writer, Executive Producer
Home Before Dark	2020–2021	Writer, Co-Executive Producer
Fire Country	2024–2026	Writer
