= Manito (film) =

- Directed by: Eric Eason
- Written by: Eric Eason
- Produced by: Jesse Scolaro; Allen Bain
- Starring: Franky G Leo Minaya; Manuel Cabral; Julissa Lopez; Jessica Morales; Hector Gonzalez; Panchito Gomez; Fulanito
- Cinematography: Didier Gertsch
- Edited by: Kyle Henry
- Music by: Saundi Wilson
- Distributed by: Film Movement.com
- Release date: 2003 (USA)
- Running time: 76 minutes
- Languages: English and Spanish with subtitles
- Budget: $25,000 (estimated)

Manito is a 2002 American independent film written and directed by first time film maker Eric Eason. Shot in the cinéma vérité style, Manito chronicles 48 incident-packed hours in the lives of a Washington Heights Latino family. One of the most critically acclaimed films of the year, Manito was hailed by critics as a film that heralded the reemergence of American neorealism and won a Special Jury Prize for Best Ensemble Cast at the Sundance Film Festival and Best Emerging Filmmaker at the Tribeca Film Festival.

== Plot ==
Manito is set against the backdrop of a changing inner city that was once a neighborhood filled with thugs, drugs, poverty, and violence and dubbed the cocaine capital of the United States, tells the story of two brothers Junior Moreno (Franky G), an ex-convict struggling to get his life back and Manny Moreno (Leo Minaya), the salutatorian of his high school class. Although the dealers were disappearing from the neighborhood, their violent legacy remained casting a shadow over the 'hood and its residents. The film begins on the morning of Manny's graduation when various principal characters reluctantly roll out of bed, communicating with each other in overlapping arguments and cell phone conversations. Muscle-bound hunk Junior Moreno immediately channels his ever-hot-tempered energy toward long-suffering wife Miriam (Julissa Lopez) as well as the Mexican foreman (Panchito Gomez) who recruits day workers for Junior's not quite legal home-plastering biz. Reasons for Miriam's wary demeanor soon become obvious: Being a husband and father hasn't cramped Junior's lady-killer instincts one whit, with wealthy female business clients definitely on his to-do list.

The day is focused on a big event: Younger sibling Manny is graduating from high school, a huge party is planned, and he is headed for Syracuse University on a full scholarship. He is the apple of everyone's eye, including his grandpa (Hector Gonzalez). Conspicuously absent from the preparations, however, is his and Junior's father Oscar (Manuel Cabral), who runs a bodega in the neighborhood but is ostracized from all contact. Only well into the story—after he's been forcibly ejected from the boisterous celebration—do we learn why: Oscar's criminal activities landed Junior in prison, after which the father abandoned him and the rest of the family. This black sheep's uninvited appearance casts a pall over the hitherto raucous party. As it breaks up, Manny insists on escorting home his date, gorgeous single-mom classmate Marisol (Jessica Morales). On the subway, two punch-drunk thugs interrupt their sweet courtship. When things get scary, Marisol uses her mace can, instigating a harrowing chase from which the young couple barely escapes. Shaken, Manny refuses an offer to sleep over. Marisol, afraid the thugs are still waiting outside, presses a handgun on him "for protection."

The next morning dawns with a new series of cell phone calls: Manny is in jail for shooting an attacker who's now in a coma; the second assailant is still at large. Junior knows from experience that little bro doesn't have what it takes to survive long in prison, especially since he's swiftly transferred to the hard-core Rikers Island.

When Junior's desperate attempts to raise bail money and secure a decent lawyer, prove fruitless, he chokes down his bitterness and approaches Oscar for help. Their tense, then terrifying confrontation reaches an awful impasse that leaves the family's future darker than before.

== Cast ==
- Franky G as Junior Moreno
- Leo Minaya as Manny Moreno
- Manuel Cabral as Oscar Moreno
- Julissa Lopez as Miriam
- Jessica Morales as Marisol
- Hector Gonzalez as Abuelo
- Panchito Gomez as Rodchenko
- Fulanito as The Band

== Awards ==
- Special Grand Jury Prize, Sundance Film Festival
- Best Emerging Filmmaker, TriBeCa Film Festival
- Open Palm Award, Gotham Awards
- Grand Jury Prize, South by South West
- Grand Jury Prize, Urbanworld Film Festival
- Best American Film, Avignon Film Festival
- Special Jury Prize, Miami International Film Festival
- Special Jury Prize, Atlanta Film Festival
- Special Jury Prize, Muestra Internacional de Cine de Santo Domingo
- Independent Spirit Award nomination, Best First Feature, Someone to Watch

Award, Motorola Producers Award
