= Eitan Gorlin =

- Born: 1969 (age 56–57); Washington, D.C., USA
- Other name: Martin Eisenstadt
- Education: University of Pennsylvania; New School
- Occupations: Filmmaker, author, actor
- Known for: role as Martin Eisenstadt
- Spouse: Dana Johnson (2016-2017; her death)
- Children: 1 (Max Gorlin b. 2014)

Eitan Gorlin (born 1969 in Washington, D.C.) is a filmmaker, author and actor. He is known for his portrayal of Martin Eisenstadt, a satirical depiction of a McCain campaign adviser. Even though Eisenstadt was said to be part of the "Harding Institute for Freedom and Democracy", named for one of the United States' less beloved presidents, he was quoted by several national news sources, who failed to document his existence.

In 2009, he co-authored the satirical novel "I Am Martin Eisenstadt: One Man's (Wildly Inappropriate) Adventures with the Last Republicans".

== Filmography ==
- The Jerusalem Syndrome (1999)
- Sometime in August (1999) Producer
- The Holy Land (2001) writer/director
- "Sheldon" (2007) co-writer, co-director and lead role
- "The Last Republican" (2008) co-writer, co-director and lead role
- Bayou Caviar (2018) co-writer

== Honors and awards ==
- 2002 Grand Jury Prize, Slamdance Film Festival for The Holy Land
