= Eric Eason =

American film director and screenwriter

Eric Eason is an American film director and screenwriter.

== Manito ==
His first feature film Manito premiered at the 2002 Sundance Film Festival where it won the Special Jury Prize and went on to win 16 awards on the International Festival Circuit including Best Film at the SXSW Film Festival, Best Emerging Filmmaker Award at the Tribeca Film Festival and the Open Palm at New York's Gotham Awards. In 2003 Eason was nominated for Best First Feature and the Someone to Watch Award at the Independent Spirit Awards.

== Journey to the End of the Night ==
Eason's second feature film, Journey to the End of the Night, starring Brendan Fraser, Mos Def, Alice Braga, Scott Glenn and Matheus Nachtergaele premiered at the 2006 Tribeca Film Festival.

== A Better Life ==
On June 24, 2011, Summit Entertainment released A Better Life a film written by Eric Eason and directed by Chris Weitz that concerns the plight of a Mexican gardener in Los Angeles trying to give his son a brighter future and avoid deportation. A Better Life was nominated for an Academy Award in the Best Actor category for Demián Bichir, and the film won a National Board of Review Award for Top Ten Independent Films.
