= Love & Diane =

2002 documentary film directed by Jennifer Dworkin

- Directed by: Jennifer Dworkin
- Produced by: Jennifer Dworkin; Jennifer Fox
- Cinematography: Tsuyoshi Kimoto
- Edited by: Mona Davis
- Production companies: Chilmark Productions; ITVS
- Release date: April 16, 2003
- Running time: 155 minutes
- Country: United States
- Language: English

Love & Diane is a 2002 documentary film directed by Jennifer Dworkin about a recovering crack addict and her troubled daughter in New York City as they navigate the obstacles of joblessness, parenthood, welfare, and public housing.

== Plot ==
The documentary was filmed over 10 years and follows Diane and her daughter, Love, as they deal with the repercussions of Diane's crack cocaine addiction. Reunited after being placed in foster care, Love, now an adult and a mother, must deal with how her mother's addiction affected her in order to become a better mother to her own child.

== Reception ==
=== Critical response ===
Critics gave Love & Diane very positive reviews, with Loren King of the Chicago Tribune saying it is "one of the most searing, heartbreaking and ultimately triumphant mother/daughter stories ever put on film." It has a critics' rating of 85 on Metacritic and 97% on Rotten Tomatoes.

=== Awards and nominations ===
Award	Category	Outcome	Ref.
Film Independent Spirit Awards	Truer Than Fiction Award	Won	
Locarno Film Festival	Golden Leopard - Video	Won	
Prism Awards	Theatrical Feature Film	Nominated	
One World Film Festival	Best Film Award	Won	
Full Frame Documentary Film Festival	MTV News Docs Prize	Won	
Chlotrudis Awards	Buried Treasure Award	Nominated	
