= List of South by Southwest Film Festival award winners =

The following is a list of award winners at the South by Southwest Film & TV Festival. The festival presents jury awards across multiple competition categories, including Narrative Feature, Documentary Feature, and several short film programs (Narrative, Documentary, Animated, Midnight, Texas, and Music Video), as well as an Independent TV Pilot Competition, Poster Design Competition, and XR Experience Competition. In addition to jury awards, all festival selections are eligible for audience awards, with voting certified by the accounting firm Maxwell Locke & Ritter.

The festival also presents various special awards, which have changed over the years. Recurring special awards have included the Louis Black "Lone Star" Award (for films shot in Texas or directed by Texas residents, named for SXSW co-founder Louis Black), the Adam Yauch Hörnblowér Award (for unconventional filmmaking in the Visions section, named for Beastie Boys member Adam Yauch), and the ZEISS Cinematography Award.

Winners of the SXSW Narrative, Documentary, and Animated Short Film jury awards are eligible for Academy Awards consideration. British short films and animations screened at SXSW are eligible for BAFTA nomination, and feature films are eligible for the Independent Spirit Awards.

== 2026 SXSW Film Awards ==
The SXSW 2026 jury and special awards were announced March 19, 2026, in Austin, Texas.

Jury Awards

| Award | Winner |
|---|---|
| Narrative Feature Competition Jury Award | Wishful Thinking, directed by Graham Parkes |
| Narrative Feature Competition Special Jury Award for Performance | Susan Kent in The Snake |
| Special Jury Award for Screenwriting | Robb Boardman, Cory Loykasek, Donny Divianian and Frankie Quiñones for Plantman & Blondie: A Dress Up Gang Film |
| Documentary Feature Competition Jury Award | Summer 2000: The X-Cetra Story, directed by Ayden Mayeri |
| Documentary Feature Competition Special Jury Award | The Last Critic, directed by Matty Wishnow and Stormbound, directed by Miko Lim |
| Narrative Short Competition Jury Award | Souvenir, directed by Renée Marie Petropoulos |
| Narrative Short Competition Special Jury Award | Supper, directed by Savannah Braswell |
| Documentary Short Competition Jury Award | In The Morning Sun, directed by Serville Poblete |
| Documentary Short Competition Special Jury Award | Eructation, directed by Victoria Trow |
| Animated Shorts Competition Jury Award | Paper Trail, directed by Don Hertzfeldt |
| Animated Shorts Competition Special Jury Award | Hag, directed by Anna Ginsburg |
| Midnight Shorts Competition Jury Award | Tongue, directed by Lim Da Seul |
| Midnight Shorts Competition Special Jury Award | Man Eating Pussy, directed by Emily Lawson |
| Texas Shorts Competition Jury Award | Forcefield of Love, directed by Liz Moskowitz and Riley Engemoen |
| Texas Shorts Competition Special Jury Award for Standout Ensemble | Stalin Boys, directed by Ora and Bianca Giaever |
| Music Video Competition Jury Award | Rawayana and Bomba Estéreo - "Fogota" directed by Paola Ossa |
| Music Video Competition Special Jury Award | Doechii - "Anxiety" directed by James Mackel |
| Independent TV Pilot Competition Jury Award | In My Blood, directed by Alex Bendo |
| Independent TV Pilot Competition Special Jury Award | Son of a Bikram, directed by Johnny Rey Diaz |
| XR Experience Competition Jury Award | Body Proxy, designed by Danny Cannizzaro and Samantha Gorman |
| XR Experience Competition Special Jury Award | The Forgotten War, designed by Hayoun Kwon |
| Agog Immersive Impact Award | A Long Goodbye, directed by Kate Voet and Victor Maes |
| Green Lens Award | Plantman & Blondie: A Dress Up Gang Film, directed by Robb Boardman |
| Janet Pierson Champion Award | Benjamin Wiessner |
| NEON Auteur Award | The Peril at Pincer Point, directed by Jake Kuhn and Noah Stratton-Twine |
| Redbreast Unhidden Award | We Were Here, directed by Pranav Bhasin |
| Best of Texas Award | Stages, directed by Ryan Booth |
| Vimeo Staff Pick | Mantis Stream! Like & Subscribe directed by Lincoln Robisch and Sarah Maerten |

Audience Awards

| Award | Winner |
|---|---|
| Headliner Audience Award | Over Your Dead Body, directed by Jorma Taccone |
| Narrative Feature Competition Audience Award | Plantman & Blondie: A Dress Up Gang Film, directed by Robb Boardman |
| Documentary Feature Competition Audience Award | The Ascent, directed by Edward Drake, Scott Veltri, and Francis Cronin |
| Narrative Spotlight Audience Award | Campeón Gabacho, directed by Jonás Cuarón |
| Documentary Spotlight Audience Award | Ceremony, directed by Banchi Hanuse |
| Midnighter Audience Award | Never After Dark, directed by Dave Boyle |
| Visions Audience Award | Daughters of the Forest, directed by Otilia Portillo Padua |
| Global Audience Award | Mickey, directed by Dano García, |
| 24 Beats Per Second Audience Award | Noah Kahan: Out of Body directed by Nick Sweeney |
| Festival Favorite Audience Award | Cookie Queens, directed by Alysa Nahmias |
| Narrative Short Competition Audience Award | We Were Here, directed by Pranav Bhasin |
| Documentary Short Competition Audience Award | I Got My Brother, directed by Victor K. Gabriel |
| Animated Short Competition Audience Award | Paper Trail, directed by Don Hertzfeldt |
| Midnight Short Competition Audience Award | The Seeing Eye Dog Who Saw Too Much, directed by Eric Jackowitz |
| Music Video Competition Audience Award | OK GO – "Love", directed by Aaron Duffy, Miguel Espada, and Damian Kulash |
| TV Premiere Audience Award | Monsters of God, directed by Eric Goode |
| TV Spotlight Audience Award | Woodstockers, directed by Oliver Bernsen, |
| Independent TV Pilot Competition Audience Award | Birth is For P*ssies, directed by Hannah Shealy and Celine Sutter |
| XR Experience Competition Audience Award | Fabula Rasa: Dead Man Talking, directed by Luiza Justus and Marcelo Marcati |
| XR Experience Spotlight Audience Award | The Clouds Are Two Thousand Meters Up, directed by Singing Chen, |

== 2025 SXSW Film Awards ==
The SXSW 2025 jury and special awards were announced March 12, 2025, in Austin, Texas.

Jury Awards

| Award | Winner |
|---|---|
| Narrative Feature Competition Jury Award | Slanted, directed by Amy Wang |
| Narrative Feature Competition Special Jury Award for a Multi-Hyphenate | Annapurna Sriram, Fucktoys |
| Narrative Feature Competition Special Jury Award for Performance | Amanda Peet in Fantasy Life |
| Documentary Feature Competition Jury Award | Shuffle, directed by Benjamin Flaherty |
| Documentary Feature Competition Special Jury Award | The Python Hunt, directed by Xander Robin |
| Documentary Feature Competition Special Jury Award | Remaining Native, directed by Paige Bethmann |
| Narrative Short Competition Jury Award | One Day This Kid, directed by Alexander Farah |
| Narrative Short Competition Special Jury Award | I'm The Most Racist Person I Know, directed by Leela Varghese |
| Documentary Short Competition Jury Award | Looking for a Donkey, directed by Juan Vicente Manrique |
| Documentary Short Competition Special Jury Award | Welcome Home Freckles, directed by Huiju Park |
| Animated Shorts Competition Jury Award | Retirement Plan, directed by John Kelly |
| Animated Shorts Competition Special Jury Award | My Wonderful Life, directed by Calleen Koh |
| Midnight Shorts Competition Jury Award | Stomach Bug, directed by Matty Crawford |
| Midnight Shorts Competition Special Jury Award | Whitch, directed by Hoku Uchiyama |
| Music Video Competition Jury Award | BIJI – "ZIGIDI", directed by Maceo Frost |
| Music Video Competition Special Jury Award | Sarah Klang – "Other Girls", directed by Rose Bush and Kirsten Bode |
| Texas Shorts Competition Jury Award | Harvester, directed by Charlie Schwan |
| Texas Shorts Competition Special Jury Award | Newbies, directed by Kimiko Matsuda-Lawrence and Megan Trufant Tillman |
| Independent TV Pilot Competition Jury Award | F*ckups Anonymous, directed by Kat Whalen |
| Independent TV Pilot Competition Special Jury Award | Denim, directed by Tedra Wilson |
| Poster Design Competition Jury Award | Resolution: A Cinephonic Rhapsody for the Soul, designed by Scott Berman, Anthony Francisco Schepperd, and Micah Buzan |
| Poster Design Competition Special Jury Award | Glorious Summer, designed by Patryk Hardziej |
| XR Experience Competition Jury Award | Reflections of Little Red Dot, created by Chloé Lee |
| XR Experience Competition Special Jury Award | Proof As If Proof Were Needed, created by Ting Tong Chang and Matt Adams |
| Agog Immersive Impact Award | In the Current of Being, created by Cameron Kostopoulos |
| Redbreast Unhidden Award | Brief Somebodies, directed by Andy Reid |
| Vimeo Staff Pick Award | Familiar, directed by Marco Novoa |
| NEON Auteur Award | Dead Lover, directed by Grace Glowicki |
| Howl of Fame Award | Indy in Good Boy, directed by Ben Leonberg |
| Best of Texas Award | Butthole Surfers: The Hole Truth and Nothing Butt, directed by Tom Stern |
| Janet Pierson Champion Award | Lindsey Dryden |

Audience Awards

| Award | Winner |
|---|---|
| Headliner Audience Award | The Accountant 2, directed by Gavin O'Connor |
| Narrative Feature Competition Audience Award | Fantasy Life, directed by Matthew Shear |
| Documentary Feature Competition Audience Award | Remaining Native, directed by Paige Bethmann |
| Narrative Spotlight Audience Award | The Baltimorons, directed by Jay Duplass |
| Documentary Spotlight Audience Award | Luv Ya, Bum!, directed by Sam Wainwright Douglas and David Hartstein |
| Midnighter Audience Award | Nirvanna the Band the Show the Movie, directed by Matt Johnson |
| Visions Audience Award | Ghost Boy, directed by Rodney Ascher |
| Global Audience Award | Corina, directed by Urzula Barba Hopfner |
| 24 Beats Per Second Audience Award | Selena y Los Dinos, directed by Isabel Castro |
| Festival Favorite Audience Award | Deaf President Now!, directed by Nyle DiMarco and Davis Guggenheim |
| Narrative Short Competition Audience Award | Ben's Sister, directed by Emma Weinswig |
| Documentary Short Competition Audience Award | Armed Only with a Camera: The Life and Death of Brent Renaud, directed by Brent Renaud and Craig Renaud |
| Animated Short Competition Audience Award | Retirement Plan, directed by John Kelly |
| Midnight Short Competition Audience Award | Lurk, directed by Mairin Hart and Josh Wallace Kerrigan |
| Texas Short Competition Audience Award | Sweetbriar, directed by Danny Rivera |
| Music Video Competition Audience Award | A$AP Rocky – "Tailor Swif", directed by Vania Heymann and Gal Muggia |
| TV Premiere Audience Award | Spy High, directed by Jody McVeigh-Schultz |
| TV Spotlight Audience Award | Mix Tape, directed by Lucy Gaffy |
| Independent TV Pilot Competition Audience Award | Bulldozer, directed by Andrew Leeds |
| XR Experience Competition Audience Award | Face Jumping, directed by Danny Cannizzaro and Samantha Gorman |
| XR Experience Spotlight Audience Award | Resolution: A Cinephonic Rhapsody for the Soul, directed by Scott Berman and Ryan Hartsell |

== 2024 SXSW Film Awards ==
The SXSW 2024 jury awards were presented March 13, 2024, in Austin, Texas at the Paramount Theater.

Jury Awards

| Award | Winner |
|---|---|
| Narrative Feature Competition Jury Award | Bob Trevino Likes It, directed by Tracie Laymon |
| Narrative Feature Competition Special Jury Award for Filmmaking | We Were Dangerous, directed by Josephine Stewart-Te Whiu |
| Narrative Feature Competition Special Jury Award for Performance | Maria Rodríguez Soto in Mamifera |
| Documentary Feature Competition Jury Award | Grand Theft Hamlet, directed by Pinny Grylls and Sam Crane |
| Documentary Feature Competition Special Jury Award for Bravery and Empathy | We Can Be Heroes, directed by Carina Mia Wong and Alex Simmons |
| Narrative Short Competition Jury Award | Dissolution, directed by Anthony Saxe |
| Narrative Short Competition Special Jury Award | Trapped, directed by Sam Cutler-Kreutz and David Cutler-Kreutz |
| Documentary Short Competition Jury Award | Remember, Broken Crayons Colour Too, directed by Shannet Clemmings and Urša Kastelic |
| Documentary Short Competition Special Jury Award | Frank, directed by David Gauvey Herbert |
| Animated Shorts Competition Jury Award | Wander to Wonder, directed by Nina Gantz |
| Animated Shorts Competition Special Jury Award | Bug Diner, directed by Phoebe Jane Hart |
| Midnight Shorts Competition Jury Award | Transylvanie, directed by Rodrigue Huart |
| Midnight Shorts Competition Special Jury Award | Meat Puppet, directed by Eros V |
| Music Video Competition Jury Award | Célen – "Mom told you so", directed by Cécile Cournelle |
| Music Video Competition Special Jury Award for Technical Wizardry | The Burning Hell – "All I Need", directed by Joe Nicolosi |
| Texas Shorts Competition Jury Award | Jedo's Dead, directed by Sara Nimeh |
| Texas Shorts Competition Special Jury Award | Hair Care, directed by Fatima Wardy |
| Independent TV Pilot Competition Jury Award | Marvin Is Sorry, directed by Clint Pang |
| Independent TV Pilot Competition Special Jury Award | Halfrican American, directed by Zeke Nicholson |
| Poster Design Competition Jury Award | 7 Beats per Minute, designed by John Godfrey |
| Poster Design Competition Special Jury Award | If I Die in America, designed by Andrei Captan |
| XR Experience Competition Jury Award | The Golden Key, directed by Marc Da Costa and Matthew Niederhauser |
| XR Experience Competition Special Jury Award | Soul Paint, directed by Sarah Ticho and Niki Smit |
| Janet Pierson Champion Award | Kara Durrett, President of Pinky Promise Films |
| Kickstarter NextGen Award | Family, directed by Benjamin Finkel |
| Best of Texas Award | Preconceived, directed by Sabrine Keane and Kate Dumke |

Audience Awards

| Award | Winner |
|---|---|
| Headliner Audience Award | Monkey Man, directed by Dev Patel |
| Narrative Feature Competition Audience Award | Bob Trevino Likes It, directed by Tracie Laymon |
| Documentary Feature Competition Audience Award | Resynator, directed by Alison Tavel |
| Narrative Spotlight Audience Award | My Dead Friend Zoe, directed by Kyle Hausmann-Stokes |
| Documentary Spotlight Audience Award | Clemente, directed by David Altrogge |
| Midnighter Audience Award | Oddity, directed by Damian McCarthy |
| Visions Audience Award | Songs From the Hole, directed by Contessa Gayles |
| Global Audience Award | Bionico's Bachata, directed by Yoel Morales |
| 24 Beats Per Second Audience Award | Faders Up: The John Aielli Experience, directed by David Hartstein and Sam Wainwright Douglas |
| Festival Favorite Audience Award | Sing Sing, directed by Greg Kwedar |
| Narrative Short Competition Audience Award | Can, directed by Kailee McGee |
| Documentary Short Competition Audience Award | Frank, directed by David Gauvey Herbert |
| Animated Short Competition Audience Award | A Crab in the Pool, directed by Alexandra Myotte and Jean-Sébastien Hamel |
| Midnight Short Competition Audience Award | Meat Puppet, directed by Eros V |
| Texas Short Competition Audience Award | Sangre Violenta / Sangre Violeta, directed by Edna Diaz and Arturo R. Jiménez |
| Music Video Competition Audience Award | Dillon Francis – "LA on Acid", directed by Parker Seaman |
| TV Premiere Audience Award | STAX: Soulsville, U.S.A., directed by Jamila Wignot |
| TV Spotlight Audience Award | Hacks Season 3 Premiere, directed by Lucia Aniello |
| Independent TV Pilot Competition Audience Award | Neo-Dome, directed by Bonnie Discepolo |
| XR Experience Audience Award | Last We Left Off, directed by Connor Illsley, Jon Riera, Grayson Moore, and Aidan Shipley |
| XR Experience Spotlight Audience Award | Emperor, directed by Marion Burger and Ilan J. Cohen |
| XR Special Event Audience Award | Kiss/Crash, directed by Adam Cole |

== 2023 SXSW Film Awards ==
The SXSW 2023 Film Festival jury awards were presented March 14, 2023, at the Paramount Theatre in Austin, Texas, and the audience awards were announced March 20, 2023.

Jury Awards

| Award | Winner |
|---|---|
| Narrative Feature Competition Jury Award | Raging Grace, directed by Paris Zarcilla |
| Documentary Feature Competition Jury Award | Angel Applicant, directed by Ken August Meyer |
| Narrative Short Competition Jury Award | It Turns Blue, directed by Shadi Karamroudi |
| Narrative Short Competition Special Jury Award | Flores del Otro Patio, directed by Jorge Cadena |
| Documentary Short Competition Jury Award | Nǎi Nai & Wài Pó, directed by Sean Wang |
| Documentary Short Competition Special Jury Award | Suddenly TV, directed by Roopa Gogineni |
| Midnight Shorts Competition Jury Award | The Flute, directed by Nick Roney |
| Midnight Shorts Competition Special Jury Award | Pennies from Heaven, directed by Sandy Honig |
| Animated Short Competition Jury Award | The Debutante, directed by Elizabeth Hobbs |
| Music Video Competition Jury Award | Amanda Sum – "Different Than Before", directed by Mayumi Yoshida |
| Music Video Competition Special Jury Award | Residente – "This is Not America ft. Ibeyi", directed by Grégory Ohrel |
| Texas Short Competition Jury Award | Breaking Silence, directed by Amy Bench and Annie Silverstein |
| Texas Short Competition Special Jury Award | When You Left Me On That Boulevard, directed by Kayla Abuda Galang |
| TV Pilot Competition Jury Award | Grown, directed by Jocko Sims |
| TV Pilot Competition Special Jury Award for Outstanding Performance | Josh Fadem in Harbor Island |
| Poster Design Competition Jury Award | Eyestring, designed by Javier Devitt |
| Poster Design Competition Special Jury Award | Riders on the Storm, designed by Casey Moore |
| XR Experience Competition Jury Award | Consensus Gentium, directed by Karen Palmer |
| XR Experience Competition Special Jury Award | Body of Mine, directed by Cameron Kostopoulos |
| Janet Pierson Champion Award | Lizzie Shapiro |
| Louis Black "Lone Star" Award | The Lady Bird Diaries, directed by Dawn Porter |
| Louis Black "Lone Star" Special Jury Award | The Herricanes, directed by Olivia Kuan |
| Thunderbird Rising Award | Paris Zarcilla for Raging Grace |
| Thunderbird Rising Special Award | Brittany Snow for Parachute |
| The Hope Award | Still: A Michael J. Fox Movie, directed by Davis Guggenheim |
| The Hope Special Award | Confessions of a Good Samaritan, directed by Penny Lane |
| Adam Yauch Hörnblowér Award | Chronicles of a Wandering Saint, directed by Tomas Gomez Bustillo |
| ZEISS Cinematography Award | Fancy Dance, cinematography by Carolina Costa |

Audience Awards

| Award | Winner |
|---|---|
| Headliner Audience Award | Flamin' Hot, directed by Eva Longoria |
| Narrative Feature Competition Audience Award | Mustache, directed by Imran J. Khan |
| Documentary Feature Competition Audience Award | Geoff McFetridge: Drawing a Life, directed by Dan Covert |
| Narrative Spotlight Audience Award | The Long Game, directed by Julio Quintana |
| Documentary Spotlight Audience Award | The Herricanes, directed by Olivia Kuan |
| Visions Audience Award | Tobacco Barns, directed by Rocío Mesa |
| Midnighter Audience Award | It Lives Inside, directed by Bishal Dutta |
| Global Audience Award | Ek Jagah Apni, directed by Ektara Collective |
| 24 Beats Per Second Audience Award | Louder Than You Think, directed by Jed I. Rosenberg |
| Festival Favorite Audience Award | No Ordinary Campaign, directed by Christopher Burke |
| Narrative Short Competition Audience Award | Closing Dynasty, directed by Lloyd Lee Choi |
| Documentary Short Competition Audience Award | Nǎi Nai & Wài Pó, directed by Sean Wang |
| Animated Short Competition Audience Award | Sandwich Cat, directed by David Fidalgo |
| Midnight Short Competition Audience Award | Dead Enders, directed by Fidel Ruiz-Healy and Tyler Walker |
| Texas Short Competition Audience Award | Breaking Silence, directed by Amy Bench and Annie Silverstein |
| Music Video Competition Audience Award | Drew Ashby – "HER", directed by Chris Scholar and Bevin Brown |
| TV Premiere Audience Award | The Luckiest Guy in the World, directed by Steve James |
| TV Spotlight Audience Award | Blindspotting Season 2 Premiere, directed by Rafael Casal |
| Independent TV Pilot Competition Audience Award | Notarize Me, directed by Erika Rankin |
| XR Experience Competition Audience Award | JFK Memento, directed by Chloé Rochereuil |
| XR Experience Spotlight Audience Award | MLK: Now is the Time, directed by Limbert Fabian |
| XR Experience Special Event Audience Award (tie) | Neo-Wulin: The Era of Black Ark, directed by Guanyu |
| XR Experience Special Event Audience Award (tie) | Ristband, directed by Anne McKinnon and Roman Rappak |
| XR Experience Special Event Audience Award (tie) | Soundwaves: A Metaverse Music Concert, directed by YOOM and Active Theory |

== 2022 SXSW Film Awards ==
The 2022 SXSW Film Festival awards were announced on March 15, 2022.

Feature Film Grand Jury Awards

| Award | Winner |
|---|---|
| Narrative Feature Competition Jury Award | I Love My Dad, directed by James Morosini |
| Narrative Feature Competition Special Jury Recognition for Extraordinary Cinematic Vision | It Is in Us All, directed by Antonia Campbell-Hughes |
| Narrative Feature Competition Special Jury Recognition for Breakthrough Performance | Elizaveta Yankovskaya in Nika |
| Documentary Feature Competition Jury Award | Master of Light, directed by Rosa Ruth Boesten |
| Documentary Feature Competition Special Jury Recognition for Exceptional Intimacy in Storytelling | Bad Axe, directed by David Siev |
| Documentary Feature Competition Special Jury Recognition for Acting in a Documentary | Steve Glew in Pez Outlaw |

Short Film Grand Jury Awards

| Award | Winner |
|---|---|
| Narrative Short Competition Jury Award | All the Crows in the World, directed by Tang Yi |
| Narrative Short Competition Special Jury Recognition for Directing and Community Filmmaking | Glitter Ain't Gold, directed by Christian Nolan Jones |
| Narrative Short Competition Special Jury Recognition for Outstanding Performances | Aphrodite Armstrong and Kyle Riggs in West by God |
| Documentary Short Competition Jury Award | Long Line of Ladies, directed by Rayka Zehtabchi and Shaandiin Tome |
| Documentary Short Competition Special Jury Recognition for Visual Reflection | not even for a moment do things stand still, directed by Jamie Meltzer |
| Midnight Shorts Jury Award | Moshari, directed by Nuhash Humayun |
| Midnight Shorts Special Jury Recognition for Powerful "Short Trip" | Omi, directed by Kelly Fyffe-Marshall |
| Animated Shorts Jury Award | Bestia, directed by Hugo Covarrubias |
| Animated Shorts Special Jury Recognition for Unexpected Emotion | Les Larmes de la Seine, directed by Yanis Belaid and Eliott Benard |
| Animated Shorts Special Jury Recognition for Visceral Storytelling | Something in the Garden, directed by Marcos Sánchez |

Audience Awards

| Award | Winner |
|---|---|
| Narrative Feature Competition Audience Award | I Love My Dad, directed by James Morosini |
| Documentary Feature Competition Audience Award | Bad Axe, directed by David Siev |
| Narrative Spotlight Audience Award | Pretty Problems, directed by Kestrin Pantera |
| Documentary Spotlight Audience Award | We Are Not Ghouls, directed by Chris James Thompson |
| Headliner Audience Award | Atlanta, directed by Hiro Murai |
| Visions Audience Award | Shadow, directed by Bruce Gladwin |
| Midnighter Audience Award | Bitch Ass, directed by Bill Posley |
| Global Audience Award | Without Prescription, directed by Juliana Maite |
| 24 Beats Per Second Audience Award | The Return of Tanya Tucker – Featuring Brandi Carlile, directed by Kathlyn Horan |
| Festival Favorite Audience Award | The Art of Making It, directed by Kelcey Edwards |
| Narrative Short Competition Audience Award | Aspirational Slut, directed by Caroline Lindy |
| Documentary Short Competition Audience Award | The Sentence of Michael Thompson, directed by Kyle Thrash and Haley Elizabeth Anderson |
| Animated Short Competition Audience Award | Five Cents, directed by Aaron Hughes |
| Midnight Short Competition Audience Award | Tank Fairy, directed by Erich Rettstadt |
| Texas Short Competition Audience Award | Act of God, directed by Spencer Cook and Parker Smith |
| Texas High School Short Competition Audience Award | Football., directed by William Herff |
| Music Video Competition Audience Award | Desirée Dawson – "Meet You at the Light", directed by Alexander Farah |
| Episodic Premiere Audience Award | 61st Street, directed by Marta Cunningham |
| Episodic Pilot Competition Audience Award | Brownsville Bred, directed by Elaine Del Valle |
| XR Experience Competition Audience Award | Gumball Dreams, directed by Deirdre V. Lyons |
| XR Experience Spotlight Audience Award | The Choice, directed by Joanne Popinska |
| Title Design Audience Award (tie) | Blade Runner: Black Lotus Title Sequence, designed by John Likens |
| Title Design Audience Award (tie) | See Season 2 Title Sequence, designed by John Likens |
| Title Design Audience Award (tie) | WandaVision Main On End Title Sequence, designed by John LePore |

Music Video Awards

| Award | Winner |
|---|---|
| Music Video Competition Jury Award | Desirée Dawson – "Meet You at the Light", directed by Alexander Farah |
| Music Video Competition Special Jury Recognition for Going the Extra Mile | Myd – "Let You Speak", directed by Dan Carr |

Texas Shorts Awards

| Award | Winner |
|---|---|
| Texas Shorts Jury Award | Folk Frontera, directed by Alejandra Vasquez and Sam Osborn |
| Texas Shorts Special Jury Recognition for Vision | Birds, directed by Katherine Propper |

Texas High School Shorts Awards

| Award | Winner |
|---|---|
| Texas High School Shorts Jury Award | Honeybee, directed by Emilio Vazquez Reyes |
| Texas High School Shorts Special Jury Recognition for Artistic Expression | It's Getting Bad Again, directed by Sarah Reyes |

Episodic Pilot Competition

| Award | Winner |
|---|---|
| Episodic Pilot Competition Jury Award | Something Undone, directed by Nicole Dorsey |
| Episodic Pilot Competition Special Jury Recognition for Unique Vision in Writing and Directing | My Year of Dicks, showrunner Pamela Ribon |

Film Design Awards

| Award | Winner |
|---|---|
| Poster Design Competition Jury Award | More Than I Remember, designed by Yen Tan and Maya Edelman |
| Poster Design Competition Special Jury Recognition | The Sentence of Michael Thompson, designed by Juan Miguel Marin |
| Title Design Competition Jury Award | Foundation Title Sequence, designed by Ronnie Koff |
| Title Design Competition Special Jury Recognition | The White Lotus Title Sequence, designed by Katrina Crawford and Mark Bashore |

XR Experience Competition

| Award | Winner |
|---|---|
| XR Experience Competition Jury Award | On the Morning You Wake (To the End of the World), directed by Dr. Jamaica Heolimeleikalani Osorio, Mike Brett, Steve Jamison, Pierre Zandrowicz, and Arnaud Colinart |
| XR Experience Competition Special Jury Recognition for Immersive Storytelling | (Hi)story of a Painting: The Light in the Shadow, directed by Quentin Darras and Gaëlle Mourre |

Special Awards

| Award | Winner |
|---|---|
| Fandor New Voices Award | What We Leave Behind, directed by Iliana Sosa |
| Adam Yauch Hörnblowér Award | Chee$e, directed by Damian Marcano |
| Adobe Editing Award | Everything Everywhere All at Once, editor: Paul Rogers |
| Louis Black "Lone Star" Award | What We Leave Behind, directed by Iliana Sosa |
| ZEISS Cinematography Award | A Vanishing Fog, cinematography by Gio Park |
| Mailchimp Support the Shorts Award | The Voice Actress, directed by Anna J. Takayama |
| 40 Years of Massive Talent Award | Presented to Nicolas Cage |

== 2021 SXSW Film Awards ==
The 2021 SXSW Film Festival was held virtually and the awards were announced on March 19, 2021.

Feature Film Grand Jury Awards

| Award | Winner |
|---|---|
| Narrative Feature Competition Jury Award | The Fallout, directed by Megan Park |
| Narrative Feature Competition Special Jury Recognition for Multi-hyphenate Storyteller | I'm Fine (Thanks for Asking), directed by Kelley Kali and Angelique Molina |
| Narrative Feature Competition Special Jury Recognition for Breakthrough Performance | Rogelio Balagtas in Islands, directed by Martin Edralin |
| Documentary Feature Competition Jury Award | Lily Topples the World, directed by Jeremy Workman |
| Documentary Feature Competition Special Jury Recognition for Exceptional Intimacy in Storytelling | Introducing, Selma Blair, directed by Rachel Fleit |
| Documentary Feature Competition Special Jury Recognition for Humanity in Social Action | Not Going Quietly, directed by Nicholas Bruckman |

Short Film Grand Jury Awards

| Award | Winner |
|---|---|
| Narrative Shorts Jury Award | Play It Safe, directed by Mitch Kalisa |
| Narrative Shorts Special Jury Recognition for Visionary Storytelling | Don't Go Tellin' Your Momma, directed by Topaz Jones and rubberband. |
| Narrative Shorts Special Jury Recognition for Direction | Like the Ones I Used to Know, directed by Annie St-Pierre |
| Documentary Shorts Jury Award | Águilas, directed by Kristy Guevara-Flanagan and Maite Zubiaurre |
| Documentary Shorts Special Jury Recognition for Courage | Red Taxi, directed by Anonymous |
| Documentary Shorts Special Jury Recognition for Poetry | I Ran From It and Was Still in It, directed by Darol Olu Kae |
| Midnight Shorts Jury Award | The Moogai, directed by Jon Bell |
| Midnight Shorts Special Jury Recognition for Bold Vision | Stuffed, directed by Theo Rhys |
| Animated Shorts Jury Award | Nuevo Rico, directed by Kristian Mercado |
| Animated Shorts Special Jury Recognition for Innovation | KKUM, directed by Kang Min Kim |
| Animated Shorts Special Jury Recognition for Storytelling | Your Own Bullshit, directed by Daria Kopiec |
| Music Video Competition Jury Award | Madame Gandhi – "Waiting for Me", directed by Misha Ghose |
| Music Video Competition Special Jury Recognition for How the Hell Did They Do That?! | Waze & Odyssey, George Michael, Mary J. Blige & Tommy Theo – "Always", directed by Nelson de Castro |
| Music Video Competition Special Jury Recognition for Pure Joy | Kuricorder Quartet – "Southpaw", directed by Sawako Kabuki |
| Texas Shorts Jury Award | Summer Animals, directed by Haley Elizabeth Anderson |
| Texas Shorts Special Jury Recognition for Vision | O Black Hole!, directed by Renee Zhan |
| Texas High School Shorts Jury Award | A Really Dark Comedy, directed by Manasi Ughadmathe |
| Texas High School Shorts Special Jury Recognition for Directing | Beyond the Model, directed by Jessica Lin |
| Episodic Pilot Competition Jury Award | 4 Feet High, directed by Maria Belen Poncio and Rosario Perazolo Masjoan |
| Episodic Pilot Competition Special Jury Recognition for Best Duo | Pretend Partners, directed by Ron Najor |

Audience Awards

| Award | Winner |
|---|---|
| Headliner Audience Award | Tom Petty, Somewhere You Feel Free, directed by Mary Wharton |
| Narrative Feature Competition Audience Award | The Fallout, directed by Megan Park |
| Documentary Feature Competition Audience Award | Not Going Quietly, directed by Nicholas Bruckman |
| Narrative Spotlight Audience Award | Language Lessons, directed by Natalie Morales |
| Documentary Spotlight Audience Award | Who We Are: A Chronicle of Racism in America, directed by Emily Kunstler and Sarah Kunstler |
| Visions Audience Award | Inbetween Girl, directed by Mei Makino |
| Midnighter Audience Award | Woodlands Dark and Days Bewitched, directed by Kier-La Janisse |
| Global Audience Award | Ninjababy, directed by Yngvild Sve Flikke |
| 24 Beats Per Second Audience Award | Soy Cubana, directed by Jeremy Ungar and Ivaylo Getov |
| Festival Favorite Audience Award | In the Same Breath, directed by Nanfu Wang |
| 2020 Spotlight Audience Award | We Are the Thousand, directed by Anita Rivaroli |
| Narrative Short Competition Audience Award | Play It Safe, directed by Mitch Kalisa |
| Documentary Short Competition Audience Award | Joe Buffalo, directed by Amar Chebib |
| Animated Short Competition Audience Award | Opera, directed by Erick Oh |
| Midnight Short Competition Audience Award | Stuffed, directed by Theo Rhys |
| Texas Short Competition Audience Award | Learning Tagalog with Kayla, directed by Kayla Abuda Galang |
| Texas High School Short Competition Audience Award | Beyond the Model, directed by Jessica Lin |
| Music Video Competition Audience Award | Kuricorder Quartet – "Southpaw", directed by Sawako Kabuki |
| Episodic Premiere Audience Award | Them, showrunner: Little Marvin |
| Episodic Pilot Competition Audience Award | 4 Feet High, directed by Maria Belen Poncio and Rosario Perazolo Masjoan |
| Virtual Cinema Competition Audience Award | Biolum, directed by Abel Kohen |
| Virtual Cinema Spotlight Audience Award | Finding Pandora X, directed by Kiira Benzing |
| Title Design Audience Award | Birds of Prey Title Sequence, designed by Michael Riley |

Film Design Awards

| Award | Winner |
|---|---|
| Poster Design Competition Jury Award | Bob Moses featuring ZHU – "Desire", creative director: Owen Brown, art director and illustrator: Benjámin Kalászi, graphic designer: Diego L. Rodríguez |
| Poster Design Competition Special Jury Recognition | The Box, designed by James Burns, Shal Ngo, and Aleksander Walijewski |
| Title Design Competition Jury Award | The Queen's Gambit Title Sequence, designed by Saskia Marka |
| Title Design Competition Special Jury Recognition | Birds of Prey Title Sequence, designed by Michael Riley |

Virtual Cinema Competition

| Award | Winner |
|---|---|
| Virtual Cinema Competition Jury Award | Samsara, directed by Huang Hsin-Chien |
| Virtual Cinema Competition Special Jury Recognition for Immersive Journalism | Reeducated, directed by Sam Wolson |

Special Awards

| Award | Winner |
|---|---|
| Brightcove Illumination Award | The Fallout, directed by Megan Park |
| Adam Yauch Hörnblowér Award | Delia Derbyshire – the Myths and the Legendary Tapes, directed by Caroline Catz |
| Adobe Editing Award | R#J, editor: Lam Nguyen |
| Final Draft Screenwriters Award | Paul Dood's Deadly Lunch Break, screenwriters: Brook Driver, Matt White, and Nick Gillespie |
| Louis Black "Lone Star" Award | Without Getting Killed or Caught, directed by Tamara Saviano and Paul Whitfield |
| ZEISS Cinematography Award | Gaia, cinematographer: Jorrie van der Walt |
| Mailchimp Support the Shorts Award | Chuj Boys of Summer, directed by Max Walker-Silverman |
| Mailchimp Support the Shorts Special Jury Recognition | Like the Ones I Used to Know, directed by Annie St-Pierre |
| Mailchimp Support the Shorts Special Jury Recognition | Malignant, directed by Morgan Bond and Nickolas Grisham |

== 2020 SXSW Film Awards ==
The 2020 SXSW Film Festival was canceled by the City of Austin due to concerns surrounding COVID-19. Jury and special awards were still announced on March 24, 2020, after filmmakers opted in and juries were assembled. Due to the event cancellation, there were no audience awards for 2020.

Feature Film Grand Jury Awards

| Award | Winner |
|---|---|
| Narrative Feature Competition Jury Award | Shithouse, directed by Cooper Raiff |
| Narrative Feature Competition Special Jury Recognition for Directing | Topside, directed by Celine Held and Logan George |
| Narrative Feature Competition Special Jury Recognition for Acting | Kofi Siriboe and Yootha Wong-Loi-Sing in Really Love, directed by Angel Kristi Williams |
| Documentary Feature Competition Jury Award | An Elephant in the Room, directed by Katrine Philp |
| Documentary Feature Competition Special Jury Recognition for Achievement in Documentary Storytelling | The Donut King, directed by Alice Gu |
| Documentary Feature Competition Special Jury Recognition for Breakthrough Voice | Finding Yingying, directed by Jiayan "Jenny" Shi |

Short Film Grand Jury Awards

| Award | Winner |
|---|---|
| Narrative Shorts Jury Award | White Eye, directed by Tomer Shushan |
| Narrative Shorts Special Jury Recognition for Acting | Morgan Sullivan and Manny Dunn in Dirty, directed by Matthew Puccini |
| Narrative Shorts Special Jury Recognition | Darling, directed by Saim Sadiq |
| Narrative Shorts Special Jury Recognition | Single, directed by Ashley Eakin |
| Documentary Shorts Jury Award | No Crying at the Dinner Table, directed by Carol Nguyen |
| Documentary Shorts Special Jury Recognition | Mizuko, directed by Katelyn Rebelo and Kira Dane |
| Documentary Shorts Special Jury Recognition | Día de la Madre, directed by Ashley Brandon and Dennis Höhne |
| Midnight Shorts Jury Award | Regret, directed by Santiago Menghini |
| Midnight Shorts Special Jury Recognition | Laura Hasn't Slept, directed by Parker Finn |
| Midnight Shorts Special Jury Recognition for Creature Design | Stucco, directed by Janina Gavankar and Russo Schelling |
| Animated Shorts Jury Award | Symbiosis, directed by Nadja Andrasev |
| Animated Shorts Special Jury Recognition | No, I Don't Want to Dance!, directed by Andrea Vinciguerra |
| Animated Shorts Special Jury Recognition | The Shawl, directed by Sara Kiener |
| Music Video Competition Jury Award | 070 Shake – "Nice to Have", directed by Noah Lee |
| Music Video Competition Special Jury Recognition for Animation | Mitski – "A Pearl", directed by Saad Moosajee and Art Camp |
| Music Video Competition Special Jury Recognition for Direction | The Lumineers – "Gloria", directed by Kevin Phillips |
| Texas Shorts Jury Award | Just Hold On, directed by Sam Davis and Rayka Zehtabchi |
| Texas Shorts Special Jury Recognition | Coup d'etat Math, directed by Sai Selvarajan |
| Texas High School Shorts Jury Award | Wish Upon a Snowman, directed by Miu Nakata |
| Texas High School Shorts Special Jury Recognition for Narrative | Ultimatum, directed by Kai Hashimoto |
| Texas High School Shorts Special Jury Recognition for Documentary | Unveiled, directed by Sofia Bajwa |
| Texas High School Shorts Special Jury Recognition for Animation | The Orchard, directed by Zeke French |
| Episodic Pilot Competition Jury Award | Embrace, directed by Jessica Sanders |
| Episodic Pilot Competition Special Jury Recognition for Drama | Chemo Brain, directed by Kristian Håskjold |
| Episodic Pilot Competition Special Jury Recognition for Comedy | Lusty Crest, directed by Kati Skelton |

Film Design Awards

| Award | Winner |
|---|---|
| Poster Design Competition Jury Award | Laura Hasn't Slept, designed by Olivier Courbet |
| Poster Design Competition Special Jury Recognition | The Donut King, designed by Andrew Hem and Charlie Le |
| Title Design Competition Jury Award | See Title Sequence, designed by Karin Fong |
| Title Design Competition Special Jury Recognition | Why We Hate Title Sequence, designed by Allison Brownmoore and Anthony Brownmoore |

Special Awards

| Award | Winner |
|---|---|
| Adam Yauch Hörnblowér Award | In & of Itself, directed by Frank Oz |
| Adobe Editing Award | You Cannot Kill David Arquette, editors: Paul Rogers and David Darg |
| Final Draft Screenwriters Award | Best Summer Ever, screenwriters: Michael Parks Randa, Will Halby, Terra Mackintosh, Andrew Pilkington, and Lauren Smitelli |
| Louis Black "Lone Star" Award | Miss Juneteenth, directed by Channing Godfrey Peoples |
| Louis Black "Lone Star" Special Jury Recognition for Performance | Rob Morgan in Bull, directed by Annie Silverstein |
| Louis Black "Lone Star" Special Jury Recognition for Documentary | Boys State, directed by Amanda McBaine and Jesse Moss |
| Vimeo Staff Picks Award | Vert, directed by Kate Cox |
| ZEISS Cinematography Award | Echoes of the Invisible, directed by Steve Elkins |

== 2019 SXSW Film Awards ==
The 2019 SXSW Film Festival jury and special awards were presented on March 12, 2019, at the Paramount Theatre in Austin, Texas.

Jury Awards

| Award | Winner |
|---|---|
| Narrative Feature Competition Jury Award | Alice, directed by Josephine Mackerras |
| Narrative Feature Competition Special Jury Recognition for Best Ensemble | Yes, God, Yes, directed by Karen Maine |
| Narrative Feature Competition Special Jury Recognition for Breakthrough Voice | Saint Frances, directed by Alex Thompson |
| Documentary Feature Competition Jury Award | For Sama, directed by Waad al-Kateab and Edward Watts |
| Documentary Feature Competition Special Jury Recognition for Empathy in Craft | Ernie & Joe, directed by Jenifer McShane |
| Documentary Feature Competition Special Jury Recognition for Excellence in Storytelling | Nothing Fancy: Diana Kennedy, directed by Elizabeth Carroll |
| Narrative Shorts Competition Jury Award | Liberty, directed by Faren Humes |
| Narrative Shorts Competition Special Jury Recognition | The Orphan, directed by Carolina Markowicz |
| Documentary Shorts Competition Jury Award | Exit 12, directed by Mohammad Gorjestani |
| Documentary Shorts Competition Special Jury Recognition | All Inclusive, directed by Corina Schwingruber Ilić |
| Midnight Shorts Competition Jury Award | Other Side of the Box, directed by Caleb J. Phillips |
| Animated Shorts Competition Jury Award | Guaxuma, directed by Nara Normande |
| Animated Shorts Competition Special Jury Recognition | Slug Life, directed by Sophie Koko Gate |
| Music Video Competition Jury Award | Hurray for the Riff Raff – "Pa'Lante", directed by Kristian Mercado |
| Music Video Competition Special Jury Recognition | Moses Sumney – "Quarrel", directed by Allie Avital and Moses Sumney |
| Texas Shorts Competition Jury Award | I Am Mackenzie, directed by Artemis Anastasiadou |
| Texas Shorts Competition Special Jury Recognition | A Line Birds Cannot See, directed by Amy Bench |
| Texas High School Shorts Competition Jury Award | Fifteen, directed by Louisa Baldwin |
| Texas High School Shorts Competition Special Jury Recognition | Double Cross, directed by Amiri Scrutchin |
| Episodic Pilot Competition Jury Award | Maggie, directed by Sasha Gordon |
| Episodic Pilot Competition Special Jury Recognition | Revenge Tour, directed by Andrew Carter and Kahlil Maskati |
| Poster Design Competition Jury Award | Daniel Isn't Real, designed by Jock (4twenty limited) |
| Title Design Competition Jury Award | Spider-Man: Into the Spider-Verse, directed by Brian Mah and James Ramirez |
| Title Design Competition Special Jury Recognition | The Darkest Minds, directed by Michelle Dougherty |
| Karen Schmeer Film Editing Fellowship | Presented to Victoria Chalk |
| Vimeo Staff Picks Award | Milton, directed by Tim Wilkime |
| ZEISS Cinematography Award | Amazonia Groove, directed by Bruno Murtinho |
| Louis Black "Lone Star" Award | The River and the Wall, directed by Ben Masters |
| Adam Yauch Hörnblowér Award | Tito, directed by Grace Glowicki |
| CherryPicks Female First Feature Award | Alice, directed by Josephine Mackerras |
| CherryPicks Special Recognition | Days of the Whale, directed by Catalina Arroyave Restrepo |

== 2018 SXSW Film Awards ==
The 2018 SXSW Film Festival announced its Jury and Special Award winners on March 13, 2018.

2018 Narrative Feature Competition

- Jury Award—Thunder Road, directed by Jim Cummings
- Special Jury Recognition For First Feature—The New Romantic, directed by Carly Stone
- Special Jury Recognition for Writing—Jinn, Director/Screenwriter: Niljla Mu'min

2018 Documentary Feature Competition

- Jury Award—People's Republic of Desire, directed by Hao Wu
- Special Jury Recognition for Best Cast—This One's For The Ladies, directed by Gene Graham
- Special Jury Recognition for Best Feminist Reconsideration of a Male Artist—Garry Winogrand: All Things are Photographable, directed by Sasha Waters Freyer

2018 Short Film Awards

- Narrative Shorts Jury Award—Emergency, directed by Carey Williams
- Narrative Shorts Special Jury Recognition for Acting—Krista, directed by Danny Madden, Actor: Shirley Chen
- Documentary Shorts Jury Award—My Dead Dad's Porno Tapes, directed by Charlie Tyrell
- Midnight Shorts Jury Award—Milk, directed by Santiago Menghini
- Animated Shorts Jury Award—Agua Viva, directed by Alexa Lim Haas
- Animated Shorts Special Jury Recognition—JEOM, directed by Kangmin Kim

2018 Music Videos Awards

- Music Video Competition Jury Award—'"Second Hand Lovers" - Oren Lavie', directed by Oren Lavie
- Special Jury Recognition for Acting—'"Territory" - The Blaze', directed by The Blaze

2018 Texas Shorts Awards

- Texas Shorts Jury Award—An Uncertain Future, directed by Iliana Sosa & Chelsea Hernandez

2018 Texas High School Shorts Awards

- Texas High School Shorts Jury Award—The Night I Lost My Favorite Jacket, directed by Jenna Krumerman
- Texas High School Shorts Special Jury Recognition—CCISD Strong, directed by Sofia Rasmussen

2018 Episodic Pilot Competition

- Episodic Pilot Competition—Beast, directed by Ben Strang
- Episodic Pilot Competition Special Jury Recognition—She's the Ticket, directed by Nadia Hallgren

2018 SXSW Film Design Awards

- Excellence in Poster Design Jury Award—The Gospel of Eureka, Designer: Matt Taylor
- Excellence in Poster Design Special Jury Recognition—A Little Wisdom, Designer: Adam Zhu
- Excellence in Title Design Jury Award—Counterpart, Director: Karin Fong
- Excellence in Title Design Special Jury Recognition—Godless, Director: John Likens

2018 SXSW Special Awards

- SXSW LUNA® Gamechanger Award—First Match, directed by Olivia Newman
- SXSW LUNA® Chicken & Egg Award—On Her Shoulders, directed by Alexandria Bombach
- Louis Black “Lone Star” Award—Daughters of the Sexual Revolution: The Untold Story of the Dallas Cowboys Cheerleaders, directed by Dana Adam Shapiro
- SXSW Adam Yauch Hörnblowér Award—Prospect directed by Zeek Earl and Chris Caldwell
- Vimeo Staff Picks Award—Krista directed by Danny Madden
- Karen Schmeer Film Editing Fellowship—Kristin Bye

== 2017 SXSW Film Awards ==
The 2017 SXSW Film Festival announced its Jury and Special Award winners on March 14, 2017.

2017 Narrative Feature Competition

- Jury Award—Most Beautiful Island, directed by Ana Asensio
- Special Jury Recognition for Breakthrough Performance—The Strange Ones, directed by Christopher Radcliff, Actor: James Freedson-Jackson
- Special Jury Recognition for Best Ensemble—A Bad Idea Gone Wrong, directed by Jason Headley, Cast: Matt Jones, Eleanore Pienta, Will Rogers, Jonny Mars, Sam Eidson, Jennymarie Jemison

2017 Documentary Feature Competition

- Jury Award—The Work, directed by Jairus McLeary and Gethin Aldous
- Special Jury Recognition for Excellence in Observational Cinema—Maineland, directed by Miao Wang
- Special Jury Recognition for Excellence in Documentary Storytelling—I Am Another You, directed by Nanfu Wang

2017 Short Film Awards

- Narrative Shorts Jury Award—Forever Now, directed by Kristian Håskjold
- Narrative Shorts Special Jury Recognition for Acting—DeKalb Elementary, directed by Reed Van Dyk, Actor: Tarra Riggs
- Narrative Shorts Special Jury Recognition—Laps, directed by Charlotte Wells
- Documentary Shorts Jury Award—Little Potato, directed by Wes Hurley & Nathan M. Miller
- Midnight Shorts Jury Award—The Suplex Duplex Complex, directed by Todd Rohal
- Animated Shorts Jury Award—Wednesday with Goddard, directed by Nicolas Menard
- Animated Shorts Special Jury Recognition—Pussy, directed by Renata Gasiorowska

2017 Music Videos Awards

- Music Video Competition Jury Award—'"RIVER" - Leon Bridges', directed by Miles Jay
- Music Video Competition Special Jury Recognition—'"The Less I Know The Better" - Tame Impala', directed by CANADA

2017 Texas Shorts Awards

- Texas Shorts Jury Award—The Rabbit Hunt, directed by Patrick Bresnan

2017 Texas High School Shorts Awards

- Texas High School Shorts Jury Award—Better Late Than Never, directed by Atheena Frizzell
- Texas High School Shorts Special Jury Recognition—Darcy's Quinceañera, directed by Sam Cooper

2017 SXSW Film Design Awards

- Excellence in Poster Design Jury Award—Fry Day, Designer: Caspar Newbolt
- Excellence in Poster Design Special Jury Recognition—Like Me, Designer: Jeremy Enecio
- Excellence in Title Design Jury Award—Into The Current, Directors: Chris R. Moberg and Jared Young

2017 SXSW Special Awards

- SXSW LUNA® Gamechanger Award—INFLAME, directed by Ceylan Ozgun Ozcelik
- SXSW LUNA® Chicken & Egg Award—I Am Another You, directed by Nanfu Wang
- Louis Black “Lone Star” Award—Mr. Roosevelt, directed by Noël Wells
- SXSW Adam Yauch Hörnblowér Award—Assholes directed by Peter Vack
- Karen Schmeer Film Editing Fellowship—Leigh Johnson

== 2016 SXSW Film Awards ==
The 2016 SXSW Film Festival announced its Jury and Special Award winners on March 15, 2016.

2016 Narrative Feature Competition

- Jury Award—The Arbalest, directed by Adam Pinney
- Special Jury Recognition for Best Actor—Hunter Gatherer, directed by John Locy, Actor: Andre Royo
- Special Jury Recognition for Best Actress—Miss Stevens, directed by Julia Hart, Actress: Lily Rabe

2016 Documentary Feature Competition

- Jury Award—TOWER, directed by Keith Maitland
- Special Jury Recognition for Portrait Documentary—Accidental Courtesy: Daryl Davis, Race & America, directed by Matt Ornstein
- Special Jury Recognition for Cinematography—The Seer, directed by Laura Dunn, Cinematographer: Lee Daniel

2016 Short Film Awards

- Narrative Shorts Jury Award—How Was Your Day?, directed by Damien O'Donnell
- Narrative Shorts Special Jury Recognition for Acting—Thunder Road, Actor: Jim Cummings
- Narrative Shorts Special Jury Recognition for Writing—Greener Grass, Writers: Jocelyn DeBoer & Dawn Luebbe
- Documentary Shorts Jury Award—These C*cksucking Tears, directed by Dan Taberski
- Documentary Shorts Special Jury Recognition—Dollhouse, directed by Terri Timely
- Midnight Shorts Jury Award—MANOMAN, directed by Simon Cartwright
- Midnight Shorts Special Jury Recognition—Don't tell Mom, directed by Sawako Kabuki
- Animated Shorts Jury Award—Glove, directed by Alexa Lim Haas & Bernardo Britto
- Animated Shorts Special Jury Recognition—Pombo Loves You, directed by Steve Warne

2016 Music Videos Awards

- Music Video Competition Jury Award—'"Sober" - Childish Gambino', directed by Hiro Murai

2016 Texas Shorts Awards

- Texas Shorts Jury Award—The Send-Off, directed by Ivete Lucas & Patrick Bresnan
- Texas Shorts Special Jury Recognition for Acting—1985, Actress: Lindsay Pulsipher

2016 Texas High School Shorts Awards

- Texas High School Shorts Jury Award—Lady of Paint Creek, directed by Alexia Salingaros
- Texas High School Shorts Special Jury Recognition—The Archer Hadley Story, directed by Ben Root & Alex Treviño

2016 SXSW Film Design Awards

- Excellence in Poster Design Jury Award—Miss Me: The Artful Vandal, Designer: MissMe
- Excellence in Poster Design Special Jury Recognition—Night Stalker, Designer: New Media Ltd
- Excellence in Poster Design Special Jury Recognition—Eat My Shit, Designer: Octavio Terol
- Excellence in Title Design Jury Award—Sunstone, Director: Aimée Duchamp

2016 SXSW Special Awards

- SXSW Gamechanger Award—My Blind Brother, directed by Sophie Goodhart
- Louis Black “Lone Star” Award—TOWER, directed by Keith Maitland
- Karen Schmeer Film Editing Fellowship—Eileen Meyer

== 2015 SXSW Film Awards ==
The 2015 SXSW Film Festival announced its Jury and Special Award winners on March 17, 2015.

2015 Narrative Feature Competition

- Grand Jury Award—KRISHA, directed by Trey Edward Shults
- Special Jury Recognition for Visual Excellence—Creative Control, directed by Benjamin Dickinson

2015 Documentary Feature Competition

- Grand Jury Award—Peace Officer, directed by Scott Christopherson, Brad Barber
- Special Jury Recognition for Directing—A Woman Like Me, directed by Alex Sichel, Elizabeth Giamatti
- Special Jury Recognition for Editing—Twinsters, Editor: Jeff Consiglio

2015 Short Film Awards

- Narrative Shorts Jury Award—Pink Grapefruit, directed by Michael Mohan
- Narrative Shorts Special Jury Recognition—Share, directed by Pippa Bianco
- Documentary Shorts Jury Award—Boxeadora, directed by Meg Smaker
- Midnight Shorts Jury Award—Kiss Kiss Fingerbang, directed by Gillian Wallace Horvat
- Animated Shorts Jury Award—World of Tomorrow, directed by Don Hertzfeldt
- Animated Shorts Special Jury Recognition—teeth, directed by Daniel Gray, Tom Brown

2015 Music Videos Awards

- Music Video Competition Jury Award—'"Iron Sky" - Paolo Nutini', directed by Daniel Wolfe
- Special Jury Recognition—'"Turn Down for What" - DJ Snake featuring Lil’ Jon', directed by DANIELS

2015 Texas Shorts Awards

- Texas Shorts Jury Award—The Samaritans, directed by John Bryant

2015 Texas High School Shorts Awards

- Texas High School Shorts Jury Award—It's A Thing, directed by Meredith Morran, Sage McCommas

2015 SXSW Film Design Awards

- Excellence in Poster Design Jury Award—Manson Family Vacation, Designer: Yen Tan
- Excellence in Poster Design Special Jury Recognition—The Ecstasy of Wilko Johnson, Designer: Jonny Halifax
- Excellence in Title Design Jury Award—Manhattan, Designer: Dan Gregoras for Imaginary Forces
- Excellence in Title Design Special Jury Recognition—The Fitzroy, Designers: Chris Tozer, Marko Anstice

2015 SXSW Special Awards

- SXSW Gamechanger Award—Free Entry, directed by Yvonne Kerékgyártó
- Louis Black “Lone Star” Award—Western, directed by Bill Ross, Turner Ross
- Karen Schmeer Film Editing Fellowship—Anna Gustavi

== 2014 SXSW Film Awards ==
The 2014 SXSW Film Festival announced its Jury and Special Award winners on March 11, 2014.

2014 Narrative Feature Competition

- Grand Jury Winner—Fort Tilden, directed by Sarah-Violet Bliss and Charles Rogers
- Special Jury Recognition for Courage in Storytelling—Animals, directed by Collin Schliffli, Actor and Screenwriter: David Dastmalchian
- Special Jury Recognition for Best Acting Duo—10.000 Km (Long Distance), directed by Carlos Marqués-Marcet, Actors: Natalie Tena and David Verdaguer

2014 Documentary Feature Competition

- Grand Jury Winner—The Great Invisible, directed by Margaret Brown
- Special Jury Recognition for Political Courage—Vessel, directed by Diana Whitten
- Special Jury Recognition for Editing and Storytelling—Print the Legend, directed by Luis Lopez and Clay Tweel

2014 Short Film Awards

- Narrative Shorts Jury Award—Quelqu’un d’extraordinaire, directed by Monia Chokri
- Narrative Shorts Special Jury Recognition—Person to Person, directed by Dustin Guy Defa
- Narrative Shorts Special Jury Recognition for Cinematography—Krisha, directed by Trey Edward Shults
- Documentary Shorts Jury Award—Kehinde Wiley: An Economy of Grace, directed by Jeff Dupre
- Midnight Shorts Jury Award—Wawd Ahp, directed by Steve Girard and Josh Chertoff
- Animated Shorts Jury Award—Coda, directed by Alan Holly

2014 Music Videos Awards

- Music Video Competition Jury Award—'"Back to Me" - Joel Compass', directed by Ian & Cooper

2014 Texas Shorts Awards

- Texas Shorts Jury Award—Some Vacation, directed by Anne S. Lewis

2014 Texas High School Shorts Awards

- Texas High School Shorts Jury Award—Seawolf, directed by Caila Pickett and Max Montoya

2014 SXSW Film Design Awards

- Excellence in Poster Design Jury Award—Starry Eyes, Designer: Jay Shaw
- Excellence in Title Design Jury Award—True Detective, Designer: Patrick Clair for Elastic
- Excellence in Title Design Special Jury Recognition—The Lego Movie, Designer: Brian Mah for Alma Mater

2014 SXSW Special Awards

- SXSW Game Changer Emergent Woman Director Award—Kelly & Cal, directed by Jen McGowan
- Special Mention—Hellion, directed by Kat Candler
- Louis Black “Lone Star” Award—Boyhood, directed by Richard Linklater
- Karen Schmeer Film Editing Fellowship—Colin Nusbaum

== 2013 SXSW Film Awards ==
The 2013 SXSW Film Festival announced its Jury and Special Award winners on March 12, 2013.

2013 Narrative Feature Competition

- Grand Jury Winner—Short Term 12, directed by Deston Cretton
- Special Jury Prize For Ensemble Cast—Burma, directed by Carlos Puga

2013 Documentary Feature Competition

- Grand Jury Winner—William And The Windmill, directed by Ben Nabors

2013 Short Film Awards

- Narrative Shorts Jury Award—Ellen is Leaving, directed by Michelle Savill
- Documentary Shorts Jury Award—SLOMO, directed by Josh Izenberg
- Midnight Shorts Jury Award—The Apocalypse, directed by Andrew Zuchero
- Animated Shorts Jury Award—Oh Willy…, directed by Emma De Swaef & Marc James Roe
- Music Videos Jury Award—'"Stamina" - Vitalic', directed by Saman Keshavarz
- Texas High School Shorts Jury Award—The Benefactress, directed by Alina Vega

2013 SXSW Film Design Awards

- Excellence in Poster Design Jury Award—Kiss of the Damned, Designer: Akiko Stehrenberger
- Excellence in Title Design Jury Award—Joven & Alocada, Designer: Pablo González

2013 SXSW Special Awards

- Chicken & Egg Narrative Woman Director Award—A Teacher, directed by Hannah Fidell
- Louis Black ‘Lone Star’ Award—Loves Her Gun, directed by Geoff Marslett
- Karen Schmeer Film Editing Fellowship—Jim Hession

== 2012 SXSW Film Awards ==
The 2012 SXSW Film Festival announced its award winners on March 13, 2012.

2012 Narrative Feature Competition

- Grand Jury Winner—Eden, directed by Megan Griffiths

2012 Documentary Feature Competition

- Grand Jury Winner—Bay of All Saints, directed by Annie Eastman

2012 Short Film Awards

- Narrative Shorts Jury Award—The Chair, directed by Grainger David
- Documentary Shorts Jury Award—CatCam, directed by Seth Keal
- Midnight Shorts Jury Award—Don't Hug Me I'm Scared, directed by Rebecca Sloan & Joseph Pelling
- SXGlobal Shorts Jury Award—The Perfect Fit, directed by Tali Yankelevich
- Animated Shorts Jury Award—(notes on) biology, directed by Danny Madden
- Music Videos Jury Award—'"My Machines" - Battles', directed by Daniels
- Texas Shorts Jury Award—Spark, directed by Annie Silverstein
- Texas High School Shorts Jury Award—Boom, directed by Daniel Matyas and Brian Broder

2012 SXSW Film Design Awards

- Excellence in Poster Design Jury Award—Man & Gun, Designer: Justin Cox
- Excellence in Poster Design Special Jury Recognition—Pitch Black Heist, Designer: Andrew Cranston
- Excellence in Title Design Jury Award—Les Bleus de Ramville, Designer: Jay Bond, Oily Film Company Inc.
- Excellence in Title Design Special Jury Recognition—X-Men: First Class, Designer: Simon Clowes, Prologue Films

2012 SXSW Special Awards

- SXSW Wholphin Award—The Black Balloon, directed by Benny Safdie and Josh Safdie
- SXSW Chicken & Egg Emergent Narrative Woman Director Award—Megan Griffiths for Eden and Amy Seimetz for Sun Don't Shine
- Louis Black “Lone Star” Award—Bernie, directed by Richard Linklater
- Special Jury Recognition—Trash Dance, directed by Andrew Garrison
- Karen Schmeer Film Editing Fellowship—Lindsay Utz

== 2011 SXSW Film Awards ==
The 2011 SXSW Film Festival announced its award winners on March 15, 2011.

2011 Narrative Feature Competition

- Grand Jury Winner—Natural Selection, directed by Robbie Pickering
- Breakthrough Performances—Evan Ross (96 Minutes), Rachael Harris (Natural Selection), Matt O'Leary (Natural Selection)
- Best Screenplay—Natural Selection, directed by Robbie Pickering, Writer: Robbie Pickering
- Best Editing—Natural Selection, directed by Robbie Pickering, Editor: Michelle Tesoro
- Best Cinematography—A Year in Mooring, directed by Chris Eyre, Director of Photography: Elliot Davis
- Best Score/Music—Natural Selection, directed by Robbie Pickering, Music By: iZLER, Curt Schneider

2011 Documentary Feature Competition

- Grand Jury Winner—Dragonslayer, directed by Tristan Patterson
- Best Editing—Where Soldiers Come From, directed by Heather Courtney, Editors: Kyle Henry & Heather Courtney
- Best Cinematography—Dragonslayer, directed by Tristan Patterson, Director of Photography: Eric Koretz
- Best Score/Music—The City Dark, directed by Ian Cheney, Music By: The Fishermen Three, Ben Fries

2011 Short Film Awards

- Narrative Shorts Jury Award—Pioneer, directed by David Lowery
- Documentary Shorts Jury Award—Mothersbane, directed by Jason Jakaitis
- Animated Shorts Jury Award—THE WONDER HOSPITAL, directed by Beomsik Shimbe Shim
- Music Videos Jury Award—'"Americanarama" - Hollerado, directed by Greg Jardin
- Texas Shorts Jury Award—8, directed by Julie Gould & Daniel Laabs
- Time Warner Cable & Ovation Young Filmmaker Scholarship for Texas High School Shorts Jury Award—( __ ), directed by Chad Werner

2011 SXSW Film Design Awards

- Excellence in Poster Design Jury Award—Silver Bullets, Designer: Yann Legendre
- Excellence in Title Design Jury Award—Blue Valentine, Designer: Jim Helton

2011 SXSW Special Awards

- SXSW Wholphin Award—The Eagleman Stag, directed by Mikey Please
- SXSW Chicken & Egg Emergent Narrative Woman Director Award—Sophia Takal for Green
- Louis Black Lone Star Award—Incendiary: The Willingham Case, directed by Steve Mims & Joe Bailey Jr.
- Karen Schmeer Film Editing Fellowship—Erin Casper

== 2010 SXSW Film Awards ==
The 2010 SXSW Film Festival announced its award winners on March 17, 2010.

2010 Narrative Feature Competition

- Winner—Tiny Furniture, directed by Lena Dunham
- Best Ensemble—Myth of the American Sleepover, directed by David Robert Mitchell
- Best Individual Performance—Phillip the Fossil, directed by Garth Donovan, Actor: Brian Hasenfus

2010 Documentary Feature

- Winner—Marwencol, directed by Jeff Malmberg
- Runner Up—War Don Don, directed by Rebecca Richman Cohen

2010 Feature Film Audience Awards

- Documentary Feature—For Once in My Life, directed by Jim Bigham and Mark Moormann
- Narrative Feature—Brotherhood, directed by Will Canon

2010 Short Film Awards

- Narrative Shorts Winner—Cigarette Candy, directed by Lauren Wolkstein
- Narrative Shorts Runner Up—Teleglobal Dreamin’, directed by Eric Flanagan
- Documentary Shorts Winner—Quadrangle, directed by Amy Grappell
- Documentary Shorts Runner Up—White Lines and The Fever: The Death of DJ Junebug, directed by Travis Senger
- Animated Shorts Winner—The Orange, directed by Nick Fox-Gieg
- Animated Shorts Runner Up—One Square Mile of Earth, directed by Jeff Drew
- Experimental Shorts Winner—Night Mayor, directed by Guy Maddin
- Experimental Shorts Runner Up—Kids Might Fly, directed by Alex Taylor

2010 Music Videos Awards

- Music Videos Winner—'"Luv Deluxe" - Cinnamon Chasers', directed by Saman Keshavarz
- Music Videos Runner Up—'"Forest" - Grizzly Bear', directed by Allison Schulnik

2010 Texas Shorts Awards

- Texas Shorts Winner—Petting Sharks, directed by Craig Elrod
- Texas Shorts Runner Up—The Big Bends, directed by Jason William Marlow

2010 Texas High School Shorts Awards

- Texas High School Shorts Winner—Give the Dog a Bone, directed by Edward Kelley
- Texas High School Shorts Runner Up—The Sleep Project, directed by Whitney Bennett and Matthew Cunningham

2010 SXSW Film Design Awards

- Excellence in Poster Design Winner—Feeder, Designer: Joseph Ernst
- Excellence in Poster Design Runner Up—Amer, Designer: Gilles Vranckx
- Excellence in Poster Design Audience Award Winner—Richard Garriott: Man on a Mission, Designer: Michael Anderson
- Excellence in Poster Design Special Jury Award—Equestrian Sexual Response, Designers: Martim Vian & Zeke Hawkins
- Excellence in Title Design Winner—Zombieland, Designer: Ben Conrad
- Excellence in Title Design Runner Up—earthwork, Designer: Stan Herd
- Excellence in Title Design Audience Award Winner—earthwork, Designer: Stan Herd
- Excellence in Title Design Special Jury Award—Enter the Void, Designers: Gaspar Noé and Tom Kam

2010 SXSW Special Awards

- Wholphin Award—Quadrangle, directed by Amy Grappell
- Chicken & Egg Emergent Narrative Woman Director Award—Lena Dunham for Tiny Furniture
- Chicken & Egg Pictures “We Believe in You” Award—Martha Stephens for Passenger Pigeons

== 2009 SXSW Film Awards ==
The 2009 SXSW Film Festival announced its award winners on March 17, 2009, with two audience awards further revealed on March 20, 2009.

2009 Narrative Feature Competition

- Winner—Made in China, directed by Judi Krant
- Special Jury Award for Best Ensemble Cast—That Evening Sun, directed by Scott Teems

2009 Documentary Feature Competition

- Winner—45365, directed by Bill Ross
- Honorable Mention—The Way We Get By, directed by Aron Gaudet

2009 Audience Awards

- Emerging Visions Winner—Motherland, directed by Jennifer Steinman
- Documentary Feature Winner—MINE, directed by Geralyn Pezanoski
- Narrative Feature Winner—That Evening Sun, directed by Scott Teems
- 24 Beats Per Second Winner—Iron Maiden: Flight 666, directed by Scot McFadyen and Sam Dunn
- Lone Star State Winner—Over the Hills and Far Away, directed by Michel Orion Scott

2009 Short Film Awards

- Reel Shorts Winner—Thompson, directed by Jason Tippet
- Reel Shorts Special Jury Award—Happy 95 Birthday Grandpa, directed by Gary Huggins
- Animated Shorts Winner—Shaman, directed by Luc Perez
- Animated Shorts Special Jury Award—Sweet Dreams, directed by Kirsten Lepore
- Experimental Shorts Winner—Cattle Call, directed by Matthew Rankin and Mike Maryniuk
- Experimental Shorts Special Jury Award—The Idiot Stinks, directed by Helder Sun
- Music Videos Winner—Thunderheist, Jerk It, directed by That Go (Noel Paul and Stefan Moore)
- Music Videos Special Jury Award—'"White Winter Hymnal" - Fleet Foxes', directed by Sean Pecknold
- Music Videos Jury Special Mention—'"Myriad Harbour" - New Pornographers', directed by Fluorescent Hill

2009 Texas High School Competition

- Winner—Performance Evaluation, directed by Breannah Gibson
- Special Jury Award—tied between Fresh Fruit, directed by Edward Kelley and Brenden Cicoria, and A Hospital Bathroom, directed by Miguel Johnson

2009 SXSW Special Awards

- SXSW & AIGA Austin Movie Poster Award Best in Show—The Dungeon Masters, directed by Keven Macalester, Designer: David Plunkert, Spur Design, LLC
- Chicken & Egg Emergent Woman Award—Made in China, directed by Judi Krant
- Wholphin Short Film Award—Sister Wife, directed by Jill Orschel

== 2008 SXSW Film Awards ==
The 2008 SXSW Film Festival announced its award winners on March 11, 2008.

2008 Narrative Feature Competition

- Grand Jury Award—Wellness, directed by Jake Mahaffy
- Special Jury Award for Cinematography—Explicit Ills, directed by Mark Webber
- Special Jury Award for Best Ensemble Cast—Up With Me, directed by Greg Takoudes

2008 Documentary Feature Competition

- Grand Jury Award—They Killed Sister Dorothy, directed by Daniel Junge
- Special Jury Award—Full Battle Rattle, directed by Tony Gerber and Jesse Moss

2008 Reel Shorts

- Winner—tied between Warlord, directed by David Garrett, and Small Apartment, directed by Andrew T. Betzer
- Special Jury Award—The Second Line, directed by John Magary

2008 Animated Shorts

- Winner—Madame Tutli-Putli, directed by Chris Lavis & Maciek Szczerbowski
- Special Jury Award—I hate you don't touch me, or Bat and Hat, directed by Becky James

2008 Experimental Shorts

- Winner—Safari, directed by Catherine Chalmers
- Special Jury Award—Upwards March, directed by Kaveh Nabatian

2008 Music Videos

- Winner—'"Me-I" - TV on the Radio', directed by Mixtape Club & Daniel Garcia
- Special Jury Award—tied between '"Temporarily in Love" - Group Sounds', directed by Randy Scott Slavin, and '"Fit Song" - Cornelius', directed by Keigo Oyamada and Koichiro Tsujikawa

2008 Texas High School Competition

- Winner—Picnic, directed by Wesley Bronez
- Special Jury Award—Inflections, directed by Matthew Campbell

2008 SXSW Special Awards

- Wholphin Award—Glory at Sea, directed by Benjamin Zeitlin
- ON Networks Greenlight Award Best Original Production—The Guild, directed by Jane Selle Morgan
- ON Networks Greenlight Award Best Original Series Idea—Knock Off, Writer: Brandi-Ann Milbradt

2008 Audience Awards

- Emerging Visions Winner—In a Dream, directed by Jeremiah Zagar
- Documentary Feature Winner—They Killed Sister Dorothy, directed by Daniel Junge
- Narrative Feature Winner—Explicit Ills, directed by Mark Webber
- 24 Beats Per Second Winner—Throw Down Your Heart, directed by Sascha Paladino

== 2007 SXSW Film Awards ==
The 2007 SXSW Film Festival announced its award winners on March 13, 2007.

2007 Narrative Feature

- Winner—Itty Bitty Titty Committee, directed by Jamie Babbit
- Special Jury Award—Frownland, directed by Ronald Bronstein
- Special Jury Award—Orphans, directed by Ry Russo-Young

2007 Documentary Feature

- Winner—Billy the Kid, directed by Jennifer Venditti
- Special Jury Award—Cat Dancers, directed by Harris Fishman
- Special Jury Award—Audience of One, directed by Michael Jacobs

2007 Reel Shorts

- Winner—Pop Foul, directed by Moon Molson
- Special Jury Award—Clear Cut, Simple, directed by Vineet Dewan

2007 Animated Shorts

- Winner—Tragic Story with Happy Ending, directed by Regina Pessoa
- Special Jury Award—One Rat Short, directed by Alex Weil

2007 Experimental Shorts

- Winner—27,000 Days, directed by Naveen Singh
- Special Jury Award—The Lonely Lights. The Color of Lemons., directed by Benjamin M. Piety

2007 Music Videos

- Winner—'"Harrowdown Hill" - Thom Yorke, directed by Chel White
- Special Jury Award—'"Working Full-Time" - Constantines, directed by Drew Lightfoot

2007 Texas High School Competition

- Winner—Murder for 9 Points, directed by Brandon Day
- Special Jury Award—Daily Routine, directed by Adela Escobar

2007 Audience Awards

- Emerging Visions Winner—The Price of Sugar, directed by Bill Haney
- Documentary Feature Winner—Run Granny Run, directed by Marlo Poras
- Narrative Feature Winner—Skills Like This, directed by Monty Miranda

== 2006 SXSW Film Awards ==
The 2006 SXSW Film Festival announced its award winners on March 13, 2006. The "24 Beats Per Second Audience Award" was shortly announced later on March 19, 2006.

2006 Narrative Feature

- Winner—Live Free or Die, directed by Andy Robin and Gregg Kavet
- Special Jury Prize for Outstanding Ensemble Cast—AMERICANese, directed by Eric Byler
- Special Jury Prize for Outstanding Visual Achievement—Inner Circle Line, directed by Eunhee Cho

2006 Documentary Feature

- Winner—Jam, directed by Mark Woollen
- Special Jury Award—Maxed Out, directed by James D. Scurlock

2006 Reel Shorts

- Winner—Hiro, directed by Matthew Swanson

2006 Animated Shorts

- Winner—The Wraith of Cobble Hill, directed by Adam Parrish King

2006 Experimental Shorts

- Winner—tied between Sea Change, directed by Joe King and Rosie Pedlow, and Marion, directed by Ry Russo-Young

2006 Music Videos

- Winner—'"Women of Japan" - Ralfe Band', directed by Nigel Coan and Ivana Zorn

2006 Texas High School Competition

- Winner—Maikafer, directed by Chris Hergert

2006 Audience Awards

- Emerging Visions Winner—High Score, directed by Jeremy Mack
- Lone Star States Winner—State vs. Reed, directed by Ryan Polomski and Frank Bustoz
- Documentary Feature Winner—Darkon, directed by Andrew Neel and Luke Meyer
- Narrative Feature Winner—AMERICANese, directed by Eric Byler
- 24 Beats Per Second Winner—Air Guitar Nation, directed by Alexandra Lipsitz

== 2005 SXSW Film Festival Awards ==
The 2005 SXSW Film Festival announced its award winners on March 18, 2005.

2005 Narrative Feature Competition

- Best Narrative Feature Jury Award—HOOLIGANS, directed by Lexi Alexander, produced by Gigi Pritzker, Deborah Del Prete, Donald Zukerman
- Best Narrative Feature Special Jury Award—CAVITE, directed by Ian Gamazon & Neill Dela Llana, produced by Ian Gamazon, Neill Dela Llana, and Quynn Ton

2005 Documentary Feature Competition

- Best Documentary Feature Jury Award—COWBOY DEL AMOR, directed by Michele Ohayon, produced by Michele Ohayon
- Best Documentary Feature Special Jury Award—THE BOYS OF BARAKA, directed by Heidi Ewing and Rachel Grady, produced by Heidi Ewing, Rachel Grady

2005 Animated Shorts Awards

- Best Animated Short Jury Award—ORPHEUS & THE UNDERWORLD, directed by Nathan Jurevicius, produced by Rosie Allimonos, ABC
- Best Animated Short Special Jury Award—ELEGY, directed and produced by Nadine Takvorian

2005 Reel Shorts Awards

- Best Reel Shorts Jury Award—THE RAFTMAN’S RAZOR, directed by Keith Bearden, produced by Brad Buckwalter
- Best Reel Shorts Special Jury Award—ALL WHITE PEOPLE ARE FRENCH, directed and produced by Katja Straub

2005 Texas Shorts Awards

- Best Texas Shorts Jury Award—TERMINATION, directed and produced by Paul Alvarado-Dykstra
- Best Texas Shorts Special Jury Award—ONCE AND FUTURE A*****E, directed by Spencer Parsons, produced by Jason Cortlund, Kyle Henry

2005 Music Videos Awards

- Best Music Video Jury Award—'"THE YEAR OF THE RAT" - Badly Drawn Boy', directed by Monkmus, produced by Douangta Inthavixay
- Best Music Video Special Jury Award—'"VERMILLION" - Slipknot', directed by Tony Petrossian, produced by Ben Oswald

2005 High School Competition

- High School Winner—COMIC, directed by David McGinnis
- First Runner Up—WORKING STUDENTS, directed by Donna Marie Miller and Taylor McBride
- Second Runner Up—LIFE OF A PENCIL, directed by David Vass

2005 Audience Awards

- Lone Star States Audience Award—THE EDUCATION OF SHELBY KNOX, directed by Marion Lipschutz amnd Rose Rosenblatt, produced by Marion Lipschutz and Rose Rosenblatt
- Lone Star States Runner Up—TROOP 1500, directed by Ellen Spiro, produced by Karen Bernstein
- Emerging Visions Audience Award—THE PUFFY CHAIR, directed by Jay Duplass, produced by Mark Duplass
- Emerging Visions Runner Up—FOUR EYED MONSTERS, directed by Arin Crumley and Susan Buice, produced by Arin Crumley and Susan Buice

== 2004 SXSW Film Awards ==
The 2004 SXSW Film Festival announced its award winners on March 16, 2004.

2004 Narrative Feature

- Jury Award for Narrative Feature—Luck, directed by Peter Wellington
- Special Jury Award for Narrative Feature—Mind the Gap, directed by Eric Schaeffer

2004 Documentary Feature

- Jury Award for Best Documentary Feature—A Hard Straight, directed by Goro Toshima
- Special Jury Award for Documentary Feature—Witches in Exile, directed by Allison Berg

2004 Competition Shorts

- Competition Shorts Jury Award—Gretchen and the Night Danger, directed by Steve Collins
- Competition Shorts Special Jury Award—9:30, directed by Mun Chee Yong

2004 Best Animated Short

- Best Animated Short Jury Award—Pan With Us, directed by David Russo
- Best Animated Short Special Jury Award—Subsidized Fate, directed by Lance Myers

2004 Best Experimental Short

- Best Experimental Short Jury Award—Dissolve, directed by Aaron Valdez
- Best Experimental Short Special Jury Award—Roothold, directed by Eric Patrick

2004 Best Music Video

- Best Music Video Jury Award—'"Better?" - 54 Seconds', directed by Tracie Laymon
- Best Music Video Special Jury Award—'"Fix Up, Look Sharp" - Dizzee Rascal', directed by Ruben Fleischer

2004 Audience Awards

- Lone Star States Audience Award—Mojados: Through the Night, directed by Tommy Davis
- Lone Star States Runner-up: A Few Good Dykes, directed by Mocha Jean Herrup
- Emerging Visions Audience Award—The Naked Feminist, directed by Louisa Achille
- Documentary Feature Audience Award—A League of Ordinary Gentlemen, directed by Christopher Browne
- Narrative Feature Audience Award—Blackballed: The Bobby Dukes Story, directed by Brant Sersen

== 2003 SXSW Film Awards ==
The 2003 SXSW Film Festival announced its award winners on March 11, 2003.

2003 Narrative Feature

- Jury Award for Best Narrative Feature—Sexless, directed by Alex Holdridge
- Special Jury Award for Narrative Feature—Happy Here and Now, directed by Michael Almereyda

2003 Documentary Feature

- Jury Award for Best Documentary Feature—Flag Wars, directed by Linda Goode Bryant and Laura Poitras
- Special Jury Award for Documentary Feature—Jon E. Edwards Is in Love, directed by Chris Bradley and Kyle La Brache

2003 Best Narrative Short

- Best Narrative Short Jury Award—Mboutoukou, directed by Victor Viyuoh and David Dill
- Best Narrative Short Special Jury Award—Family Tree, directed by Vicky Jenson

2003 Best Documentary Short

- Best Documentary Short Jury Award—Nutria, directed by Ted Gesing
- Best Documentary Short Special Jury Award—The Ocularist, directed by Vance Malone

2003 Best Animated Short

- Best Animated Short Jury Award—Intelligent Life, directed by Jeff Spoonhower
- Best Animated Short Special Jury Award—Stiltwalkers, directed by Sjaak Meilink

2003 Best Experimental Short

- Best Experimental Short Jury Award—Ablution, directed by Eric Patrick
- Best Experimental Short Special Jury Awards—Powwow, directed by Kristin Pepe, and Post Mark Lick, directed by Sonia Bridge and David Brown

2003 Best Music Video

- Best Music Video Jury Award—'"Nutella and Gummi Bear Sandwich" - Precarious Warehaus Dwellers', directed by David Zellner
- Best Music Video Special Jury Award—'"Rock Shock" - Roy Davis and Thomas Bangalter', directed by Joel Lava

2003 Audience Awards

- Narrative Feature Audience Award—Sexless, directed by Alex Holdridge
- Narrative First Film Audience Award—Melvin Goes to Dinner, directed by Bob Odenkirk
- Documentary Feature Audience Award—girlhood, directed by Liz Garbus
- Documentary First Film Audience Award—The Flute Player, directed by Jocelyn Glatzer

== 2002 SXSW Film Awards ==
The 2002 SXSW Film Festival announced its award winners on March 14, 2002.

2002 Narrative Feature

- Jury Award for Best Narrative Feature—Manito, directed by Eric Eason
- Special Jury Award for Narrative Feature—The Misanthrope, directed by Allen Colombo

2002 Documentary Feature

- Jury Award for Best Documentary Feature—Spellbound, directed by Jeff Blitz
- Special Jury Award for Documentary Feature—Escuela (School), directed by Hannah Weyer

2002 Best Narrative Short

- Best Narrative Short Jury Award—For Our Man, directed by Kazuo Ohno
- Best Narrative Short Special Jury Award—tied between Gym Short, directed by Doug Schachtel, and Modern Daydreams: Islands in the Sky, directed by Mitchell Rose

2002 Best Documentary Short

- Best Documentary Short Jury Award—In Between Days, directed by Lori Lovoy-Goran
- Best Documentary Short Special Jury Award—Hazlo por Cuba, directed by David Ellsworth

2002 Best Animated Short

- Best Animated Short Jury Award—Profiles in Science, directed by Wes Kim
- Best Animated Short Special Jury Award—tied between Populi, directed by David Russo, and Vessel Wrestling, directed by Lisa Yu

2002 Best Experimental Short

- Best Experimental Short Jury Award—N.ew Y.ork C.asino, directed by Kyle Henry
- Best Experimental Short Special Jury Award—Candide, directed by John Davis

2002 Best Music Video

- Best Music Video Jury Award—'"Bohemian Like You" - The Dandy Warhols', directed by Courtney Taylor
- Best Music Video Special Jury Award—'"Drop" - Cornelius', directed by Koichi Tsujikawa

2002 Best Midnight Shorts

- Best Midnight Shorts Jury Award—tied between Nougat, directed by Tibor Szakaly and Bill Fiala, and Interview With Spike Jonze, directed by Jonah Kaplan

2002 Audience Awards

- Documentary Feature Audience Award—Mai's America, directed by Marlo Poras
- Documentary First Film Audience Award—Lifetime Guarantee: Phranc's Adventures in Plastic, directed by Lisa Udelson
- Narrative Feature Audience Award—By Hook or by Crook, directed by Harry Dodge, Silas Howard
- Narrative First Film Audience Award (tie)—Charlotte Sometimes, directed by Eric Byler; Made-Up, directed by Tony Shalhoub

== 2001 SXSW Film Awards ==
The 2001 SXSW Film Festival announced its award winners on March 13, 2001.

2001 Narrative Feature

- Narrative Feature Jury Award—Low Self-Esteem Girl, directed by Blaine Thurier
- Narrative Feature Runner Up—The Zeros, directed by John Ryman

2001 Documentary Feature

- Documentary Feature Jury Award—Hybrid, directed by Monteith McCollum
- Documentary Feature Runners Up—Okie Noodling, directed by Bradley Beesley, and Amato: A Love Affair With Opera, directed by Steven Ives

2001 Narrative Short

- Narrative Short Jury Award—Helicopter, directed by Ari Gold
- Narrative Short Runners Up—Cleave, directed by Hollie Lavenstein, and Delusions in Modern Primitivism, directed by Daniel Loflin

2001 Documentary Short

- Documentary Short Jury Award—Atomic Ed and the Black Hole, directed by Ellen Spiro
- Documentary Short Runner Up—Hotel Hidajet, directed by Kelly Nathe

2001 Experimental Short

- Experimental Short Jury Award—Insect, directed by Julian Dahl
- Experimental Short Runner Up—Thermostat, directed by Kevin Everson

2001 Animated Short

- Animated Short Jury Award—Sub!, directed by Jesse Schmal
- Animated Short Runner Up—Ramblin Man, directed by Aaron Augenblick

2001 Music Video

- Music Video Jury Award—'"How We Used to Live" - St. Etienne', directed by Mikey Tomkins
- Music Video Runner Up—'"Mud Hill" - Samiam', directed by Darren Doane

2001 Audience Awards

- Narrative Feature Audience Award—The Zeros, directed by John Ryman
- Narrative First Film Audience Award—The Journeyman, directed by James Crowley
- Documentary Audience Award—Okie Noodling, directed by Bradley Beesley
- Documentary First Film Audience Award—Los Trabajadores/The Workers, directed by Heather Courtney
- International Film Audience Award—Tillsammans/Together, directed by Lukas Moodysson
- Midnight Film Audience Award—three-way tie between Super Troopers, directed by Jay Chandrasekhar, Wave Twisters, directed by Syd Garon and Eric Henry, and Ladyporn, directed by Maggie Carey and Elena Carr

== 2000 SXSW Film Awards ==
The 2000 SXSW Film Festival announced its award winners in March 2000.

2000 Narrative Feature

- Narrative Feature Jury Award—tied between Rollercoaster, directed by Scott Smith, and Wildflowers, directed by Melissa Painter

2000 Documentary Feature

- Documentary Feature Jury Award—The Target Shoots First, directed by Christopher Wilcha
- Documentary Feature Runners Up—The Ballad of Ramblin' Jack, directed by Aiyana Elliott, and Just, Melvin, directed by James Ronald Whitney

2000 Narrative Short

- Narrative Short Jury Award—Five Feet High and Rising, directed by Peter Sollett
- Narrative Short Runners Up—I Still Miss Someone, directed by John Lloyd Miller, and The Speed of Light, directed by Anne-Marie Hess

2000 Documentary Short

- Documentary Short Jury Award—Kingdom of Poet O, directed by Dennis Karsten
- Documentary Short Runner Up—Moonshine, directed by Kelly L. Riley

2000 Animated Short

- Animated Short Jury Award—When the Day Breaks, directed by Wendy Tilby, Amanda Forbis
- Animated Short Runners Up—Fishing, directed by David Gainey, and Elevator World, directed by Mitchell Rose

2000 Experimental Short

- Experimental Short Jury Award—The Drowning Room, directed by Reynold Reynolds, Patrick Jolley
- Experimental Short Runner-Up—Grace, directed by Lorelei Pepi

2000 Music Video

- Music Video Jury Award—'"B-line" - Lamb', directed by Hammer & Tongs
- Music Video Runner-Up—'"Concentrate" - The Mittens', directed by Bryant Jackson

2000 Audience Awards

- Narrative Feature Audience Award—Loving Jezebel, directed by Kwyn Bader
- Documentary Feature Audience Award—The Target Shoots First, directed by Christopher Wilcha
- Narrative First Film Audience Award—The Woman Chaser, directed by Robinson Devor
- Documentary First Film Audience Award—Beyond the Mat, directed by Barry W. Blaustein
- Midnight Film Audience Award—Outside Out, directed by Mike Gordon
- Senior Programmers' Pick—Dark Days, directed by Marc Singer
