= Skip Day (disambiguation) =

Skip Day or Senior Skip Day is a long-standing tradition in most American and Canadian high schools and junior high school where the senior class will excuse themselves from school on a pre-determined day.

Skip Day or Senior Skip Day may also refer to:

- "Skip Day" (The Cleveland Show), a season 3 episode
- "Senior Skip Day", a song by American rapper Mac Miller from the 2010 album K.I.D.S.
- "Skip Day", a 2014 episode of Odd Squad
- Skip Day, a 2018 documentary short film by Ivete Lucas
- Senior Skip Day, a 2008 direct-to-DVD film starring Larry Miller, Lea Thompson, Tara Reid, and Kayla Ewell
