= Patrick Bresnan =

American film director and cinematographer

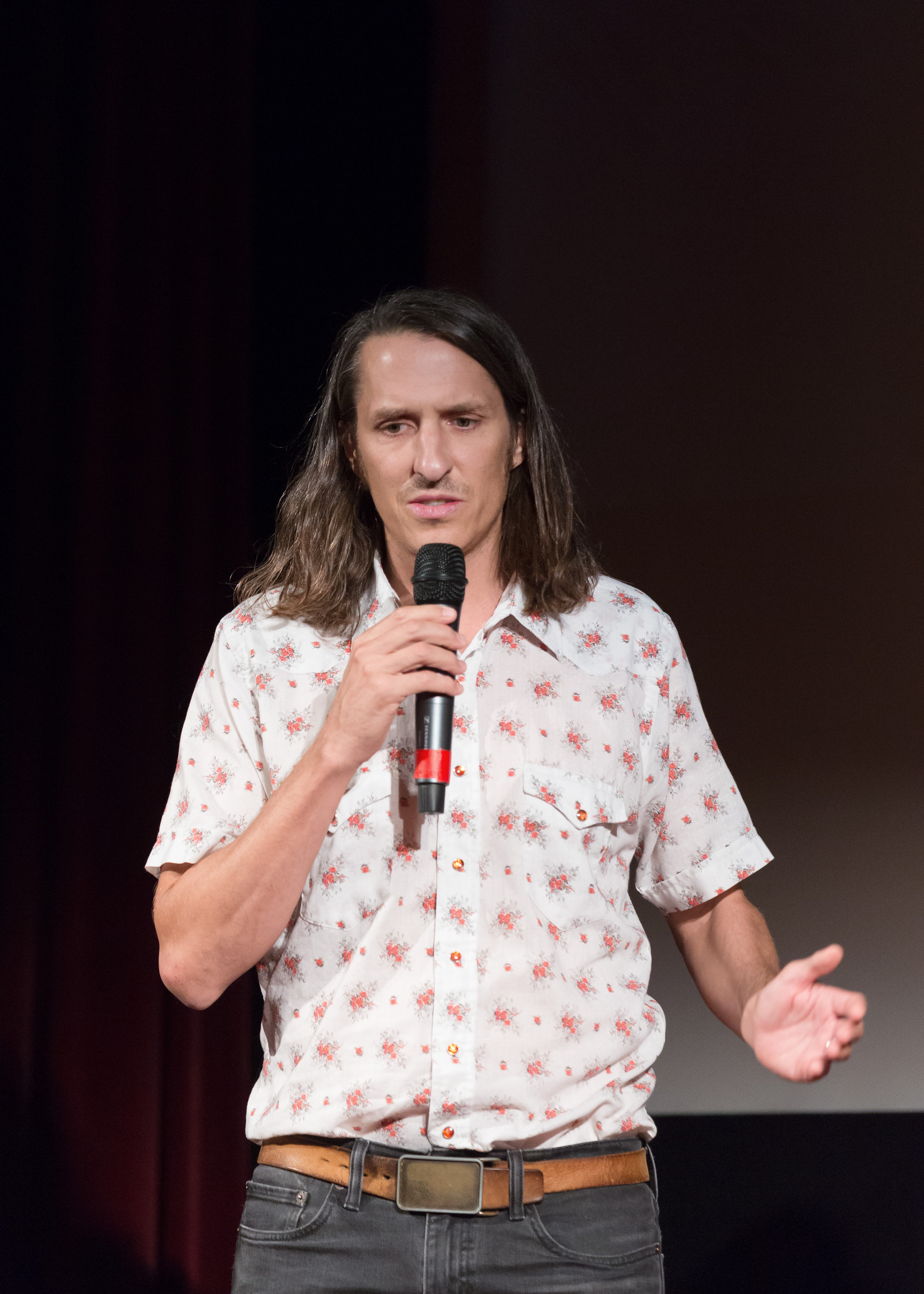
- Bresnan at the Vienna Shorts awards in 2017
- Born: New York City, U.S.
- Education: University of Texas at Austin
- Occupations: Film director; cinematographer; producer
- Years active: 2011–present
- Partner: Ivete Lucas

Patrick Xavier Bresnan is an American film director and cinematographer. He is known for his collaborations with his partner, the filmmaker Ivete Lucas, with whom he has made a series of documentaries set in and around Pahokee, Florida, a rural town on Lake Okeechobee in the Florida Everglades. Bresnan and Lucas typically live for extended periods in the communities where they film, and their work often incorporates footage recorded by the people they document. Bresnan directed the short The Rabbit Hunt (2017) and co-directed The Send-Off (2016), Roadside Attraction (2017), and Skip Day (2018) with Lucas; the four films premiered at the Sundance Film Festival, the Berlin International Film Festival, the Toronto International Film Festival, and the Directors' Fortnight at Cannes. The pair's first feature, Pahokee (2019), premiered in the Sundance documentary competition and was later broadcast on PBS.

Bresnan was a cinematographer on Boys State (2020), which won the Sundance Grand Jury Prize. He and Lucas co-directed the feature Naked Gardens (2022) and the short The Passing (2023), which won the Pardino d'oro for best auteur short film at the Locarno Film Festival. Bresnan directed the short The Contestant (2025), based on video he shot as a teenager, which premiered at the Toronto International Film Festival. Bresnan directed the feature First They Came for My College (2026), which documents the political takeover of New College of Florida. Alongside filmmaking, Bresnan and Lucas have exhibited photography, video, and installation work, often made with and about queer communities, under the names Otis Ike and Ivete Lucas.

== Early life ==
Bresnan was born in New York City and moved with his family to Palm Beach County, Florida. In the 1990s, while living in San Francisco, he sang for the band La Pistola, which released the single "Spider" on Frenetic Records in 1997. He did not attend film school. Instead he trained as a visual artist, working from 2003 to 2007 as a fabricator for the Mission School artists Clare Rojas and Barry McGee. He later earned a master's degree in sustainable design from the University of Texas at Austin School of Architecture. Under the name Otis Ike, he has worked as a photographer and, separately from his filmmaking, as a builder of disaster-relief housing on the Gulf Coast and of housing for the homeless in Austin, Texas.

== Career ==
=== Early work (2008–2015) ===
Bresnan and Lucas co-directed the short The Curse and the Jubilee (2011), which depicts a Fourth of July celebration in Ivanhoe, Virginia, a former mining town. The Atlantic published the film online in 2018. Bresnan produced the short Rougarouing and worked as a researcher and camera operator on the feature documentary Killing Time, which screened at IDFA. Beginning in 2008, Bresnan and Lucas, working as Otis Ike and Ivete Lucas, spent four years documenting the subculture of Vietnam War re-enactors under the title One Big Misunderstanding; the project was presented as a photography, video, and performance installation at G Gallery in Houston, as a part of the 2012 FotoFest Biennial, from March 3 to April 1, 2012, including a live war re-enactment and a mock USO show. The project was completed as a feature documentary in 2015 and received a production grant from the Austin Film Society.

=== The Send-Off (2016) ===
The Send-Off, a short documentary about prom night in Pahokee, Florida, was co-directed by Bresnan and Lucas. It premiered at the Sundance Film Festival in 2016 and screened at SXSW, the San Francisco International Film Festival, and AFI Fest. It won the Grand Jury Award for Texas Shorts at SXSW, a Golden Gate Award for best documentary short in San Francisco, and a jury award at AFI Fest. After its release, Filmmaker Magazine named Bresnan and Lucas to its 25 New Faces of Independent Film list.

=== The Rabbit Hunt (2017) ===
The Rabbit Hunt, a 12-minute short directed by Bresnan and produced and edited by Lucas, follows 17-year-old Chris and his family as they hunt rabbits in the sugar fields near Lake Okeechobee, where the hunt is a rite of passage among farmworker families. The film premiered at Sundance in January 2017 and had its international premiere in the Berlinale Shorts section of the Berlin International Film Festival. It won 20 festival awards, among them a Cinema Eye Honors award, the SXSW Grand Jury Award for Texas Shorts, a second Golden Gate Award, and best short film prizes at the BFI London Film Festival, Sheffield Doc/Fest, the Melbourne International Film Festival, and the Florida Film Festival. In 2018, a companion exhibition of production stills and a re-edited version of the film was presented at Rice University's Rice Media Center Gallery in Houston.

=== Roadside Attraction (2017) ===
Roadside Attraction, co-directed by Bresnan and Lucas, observes a crowd of onlookers gathered to watch Air Force One. It premiered in competition at the Toronto International Film Festival in 2017.

=== Skip Day (2018) ===
Skip Day, co-directed by Bresnan and Lucas and produced by The Guardian's documentary unit, follows Pahokee high school seniors on a trip to the beach the day after prom. It had its world premiere at the Directors' Fortnight at the Cannes Film Festival, where it won the Illy Prize for short film.

=== Pahokee (2019) ===
Pahokee, the pair's first feature together, was co-directed by Bresnan and Lucas; Bresnan also produced and shot the film. It follows four high school seniors, Na'Kerria, Jocabed, Junior, and BJ, through their final year in the town. The two filmmakers had spent several years making shorts in Pahokee before starting the feature. It premiered in the documentary competition at the Sundance Film Festival in January 2019. Monica Castillo of Remezcla praised its portrait of Black and Latino students in a rural farming community. The Hollywood Reporter and Variety also reviewed the film. Pahokee won Best Homegrown Feature at the Miami Film Festival and screened at more than 50 festivals. PBS broadcast it on February 16, 2021, as part of the America ReFramed series.

=== Boys State (2020) ===
Bresnan was one of the cinematographers on Boys State, directed by Amanda McBaine and Jesse Moss, which follows a mock government program for teenage boys in Austin, Texas. The film won the Grand Jury Prize in the U.S. Documentary Competition at Sundance in January 2020 and was acquired by Apple TV+ and A24.

=== Happiness Is a Journey (2021) ===
Happiness Is a Journey, a short co-directed by Bresnan and Lucas and produced by The Guardian, follows Eddie "Bear" Lopez, a longtime newspaper carrier in East Austin, through a Christmas Eve shift at the warehouse where the papers are sorted. It had its world premiere at the Locarno Film Festival in August 2021 and screened at the BFI London Film Festival later that year.

=== Naked Gardens (2022) ===
Naked Gardens, a feature co-directed by Bresnan and Lucas, portrays Sunsport Gardens, a family naturist resort in the Florida Everglades, as its residents prepare for the Mid-Winter Naturist Festival. The film premiered in the documentary competition at the Tribeca Festival on June 10, 2022, and had its European premiere at IDFA. The two directors filmed in the nude themselves as a condition of access to the community. The film won Best Documentary Feature at the Tallahassee Film Festival, the Grand Jury Award for Documentary at the New Hampshire Film Festival, and the Special Jury Prize for Excellence in American Profiles at SF IndieFest.

=== The Passing (2023) ===
The Passing, a short co-directed by Bresnan and Lucas, follows Michael Mullen, a house-call veterinarian in Austin, as he helps a neighbor through the end of her dog's life. The film premiered at the Locarno Film Festival, where it won the Pardino d'oro Swiss Life for best auteur short film, and had its North American premiere in the Short Cuts program at the Toronto International Film Festival. It screened at SXSW in 2024 and is distributed by The New Yorker. The film was shot in the Clarksville neighborhood of Austin, where Bresnan and Lucas lived before moving to Asheville, North Carolina.

=== The Contestant (2025) ===
The Contestant, directed solely by Bresnan with Lucas as producer, is built from video he shot at age 19 in 1996, when he and friends entered a hometown contest at which Baywatch star David Hasselhoff appeared to award a role on the show. The film had its world premiere in the Short Cuts programme at the Toronto International Film Festival in September 2025.

=== First They Came for My College (2026) ===
First They Came for My College, directed by Bresnan, documents the 2023 conservative takeover of New College of Florida initiated by Governor Ron DeSantis. The film centers on students, faculty, and parents who resisted the change in administration, and much of it draws on footage the students recorded on their phones. Holly Herrick, an alumna of the college and head of film at the Austin Film Society, produced the film with Harry W. Hanbury, Bresnan, and Zackary Drucker; Leah Marino and Lucas edited it.

The film premiered at the True/False Film Festival in March 2026 and screened at SXSW, the Independent Film Festival Boston, DC/DOX, and the San Francisco International Film Festival. A New College spokesman disputed the film's account and called it sensationalized.

== Visual art ==
Working under the name Otis Ike alongside Ivete Lucas, Bresnan has exhibited photography, video, and installation work since 2009, often made in and with queer, immigrant, and working-class communities. In 2011, the pair's video and photography installation on Latin American drag performers and identity was one of the central works in Queer State(s) at the University of Texas at Austin's Visual Arts Center; the same installation paired the drag material with footage of a young boy in Ivanhoe, Virginia, the subject of The Curse and the Jubilee. The pair have shown work at FotoFest in Houston three times: in the group show Nowhere Near Here: New Lens-Based Work from Texas (2011), curated by Toby Kamps and Michelle White of the Menil Collection; as part of One Big Misunderstanding at G Gallery during the 2012 FotoFest Biennial; and, with Lucas showing solo, in Crónicas: Seven Contemporary Mexican Artists Confront the Drug War (2013). Other exhibitions include Libres y Lokas at Domy Books in Austin (2009), the subject of a cover story by Andy Campbell in Art Lies; Manifest Destiny at Richland College Gallery in Dallas (2010); L. Quan – Check Cashing & Healing Arts Centre at Ratio 3 in San Francisco (2015), curated by Barry McGee; Love Letters in a Tree at Lawndale Art Center in Houston (2014); Channel One at Ratio 3 (2018); Explorations of Place at Drawing Lines in Austin (2016); and Feels Like 97° at Oolite Arts in Miami (2021), a group show on South Florida life curated by Michelle Lisa Polissaint.

== Filmography ==
=== Features ===
Year	Title	Director	Cinematographer	Notes
2015	One Big Misunderstanding	Yes	Yes	Made with Ivete Lucas
2019	Pahokee	Yes	Yes	Co-directed with Ivete Lucas; also producer
2020	Boys State	No	Yes	Directed by Amanda McBaine and Jesse Moss
2022	Naked Gardens	Yes	Yes	Co-directed with Ivete Lucas
2026	First They Came for My College	Yes	Yes	Also producer

=== Short films ===
Year	Title	Director	Cinematographer	Notes
2011	The Curse and the Jubilee	Yes	Yes	Co-directed with Ivete Lucas
2016	The Send-Off	Yes	Yes	Co-directed with Ivete Lucas
2017	The Rabbit Hunt	Yes	Yes	Sole director; produced and edited by Ivete Lucas
2017	Roadside Attraction	Yes	Yes	Co-directed with Ivete Lucas
2018	Skip Day	Yes	Yes	Co-directed with Ivete Lucas
2021	Happiness Is a Journey	Yes	Yes	Co-directed with Ivete Lucas
2023	The Passing	Yes	Yes	Co-directed with Ivete Lucas
2025	The Contestant	Yes	Yes	Sole director; Ivete Lucas produced

== Awards ==
Year	Award	Category	Work	Result	Ref.
2016	SXSW Film Festival	Grand Jury Award, Texas Shorts	The Send-Off	Won	
2016	San Francisco International Film Festival	Golden Gate Award for Best Documentary Short	The Send-Off	Won	
2017	SXSW Film Festival	Grand Jury Award, Texas Shorts	The Rabbit Hunt	Won	
2017	San Francisco International Film Festival	Golden Gate Award for Best Documentary Short	The Rabbit Hunt	Won	
2017	BFI London Film Festival	Best Short Film	The Rabbit Hunt	Won	
2018	Cinema Eye Honors	Nonfiction short filmmaking	The Rabbit Hunt	Won	
2018	Directors' Fortnight	Illy Prize for short film	Skip Day	Won	
2019	Miami Film Festival	Best Homegrown Feature	Pahokee	Won	
2022	Tallahassee Film Festival	Best Documentary Feature	Naked Gardens	Won	
2022	New Hampshire Film Festival	Grand Jury Award, Documentary	Naked Gardens	Won	
2023	SF IndieFest	Special Jury Prize for Excellence in American Profiles	Naked Gardens	Won	
2023	Locarno Film Festival	Pardino d'oro Swiss Life for the Best Auteur Short Film	The Passing	Won	

== Personal life ==
Bresnan is partnered with the filmmaker Ivete Lucas, with whom he makes most of his films. The couple lived in Austin, Texas, for many years before moving to Asheville, North Carolina. In Asheville, Bresnan serves on the board of directors of Haywood Street Community Development, an affordable-housing nonprofit.
