= Pahokee (film) =

- Poster
- Directed by: Ivete Lucas; Patrick Bresnan
- Produced by: Ivete Lucas; Patrick Bresnan; Linda Dodwell; Ryan Heller; Lisa Leingang; Jihan Robinson; Jeff Seelbach; Maida Lynn; PJ Raval; Laurence Reymond; Monique Walton
- Starring: B.J. Crawford; Jocabed Martinez; Na'Kerria Nelson; Junior Walker
- Cinematography: Patrick Bresnan
- Edited by: Ivete Lucas
- Production company: Topic Studios
- Distributed by: Arizona Distribution; Monument Releasing
- Release date: January 27, 2019 (Sundance)
- Running time: 110 minutes
- Country: United States
- Language: English

Pahokee is a 2019 American documentary film directed by Ivete Lucas and Patrick Bresnan about the small rural town of Pahokee located in the Florida Everglades. The film uses an observational approach to follow four teenagers as they navigate their senior year of high school. The film premiered in the United States at the Sundance Film Festival and internationally at Visions du Réel in Switzerland.

== Synopsis ==
The film follows four high school students at Pahokee High School, a school that is integral to the surrounding community. The film follows Na'Kerria, a high school cheerleader who is hoping to become Miss Pahokee High School. She spends her senior year multi-tasking between working at a fried fish restaurant, cheerleading, campaigning for the pageant, and getting her schoolwork done. Next is Jocabed, the youngest daughter of Mexican immigrants and a high-achieving student who is working to finish the year at the top of her class and go to her dream school, the University of Florida. Next, Junior is a father to a one-year-old baby girl who is struggling to balance schoolwork, marching band, and the demands of parenthood. Finally, BJ is the football team co-captain who is a budding leader on and off the field. With the help of his parents, he hopes to attend college and possibly play football there.

== Reception ==
As of February 2022 the film has a 100% rating on Rotten Tomatoes. Jen Yamato of the Los Angeles Times says, "with a patient and unobtrusive eye, filmmakers Lucas and Bresnan paint impressionistic portraits of a quartet of charismatic teenagers over the course of a pivotal school year.” Variety hailed the film as, "lively and rousing as a generational snapshot, buoyed by the lovable, resilient kids at its heart."

Following the film's premiere at the Sundance Film Festival, Daniel Fienberg of The Hollywood Reporter said "Pahokee is the best documentary I've seen this Sundance. It's 'America To Me' only verité and in a 112-minute micro.”

== Screenings ==
Festival	Award
Encounters Film Festival	
Lost Weekend XII Film Festival	
Sidewalk Film Festival	Special Prize for Documentary Filmmaking
Los Angeles Latino International Film Festival	
Guanajuato International Film Festival	
Champs-Élysées Film Festival	Prix du Jury
Oak Cliff Film Festival	
Olhar De Cinema	
Dokufest (Kosovo)	
American Film Festival (Poland)	
Doclands Documentary Film Festival	
Montclair Film Festival	Special Prize for Cinematography
Bentonville Fim Festival	
Maryland Film Festival	
San Francisco International Film Festival	
Sarasota Film Festival	
Florida Film Festival	
Independent Film Festival Boston	
Ashland Independent Film Festival	Best Editing; Documentary Feature
Visions du Réel International Film Festival Nyon	
SXSW Film Festival	
Miami Film Festival	Knight Made in MIA Award
Cinematek	
Indiecork Film Festival	
Hamptons International Film Festival	
New Hampshire Film Festival	
Hot Springs Documentary Film Festival	
Virginia Film Festival	
Naples Film Festival	
Smells Like Teen Spirit Film Festival	
Panorama Internacional Coisa De Cinema	
Philadelphia Film Society
