= The Mosuo Sisters =

The Mosuo Sisters is a 2012 documentary film by Marlo Poras that chronicles the lives of two sisters, Jua Ma and La Tsuo, who are members of one of the last matriarchal societies, the Mosuo tribe. Being an ethnic minority in China, the film explores their journey from working at a bar in Beijing to moving back home to their village in the Himalayas, dealing with the modern world impinging upon the traditional Mosuo culture and way of life.

== Synopsis ==
The filmmakers followed Jua Ma and La Tsuo for over two years, chronicling their lives as they moved back home and back to their culture. The Mosuo tribe is the last remaining matriarchal society in China and one of the last ones in the world. Both sisters face many misconceptions when it comes to their rare culture, especially about the concept of walking marriages. As the sisters return to their home and the traditional culture of the Mosuo, they struggle with reconciling the modern society of Beijing with their own culture. Jua Ma returns to the city in hopes of pursuing an entertainment career that will allow her to support her family, while La Tsuo sacrifices her accounting class and hopes for a future in accounting in order to stay home and help on the farm.

== Awards ==
- Best Documentary Film, Rural Route Film Festival.
