= Ivete Lucas =

American documentary filmmaker

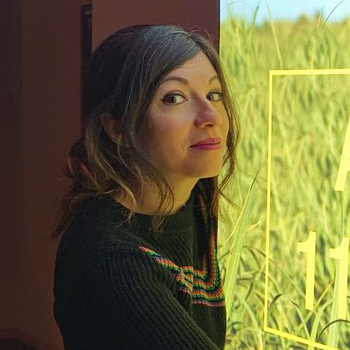
- Born: 1983 (age 42–43); São Paulo, Brazil
- Education: Universidad de Monterrey (BA); University of Texas at Austin (MFA)
- Occupations: Film director; editor; producer
- Years active: 2008–present
- Partner: Patrick Bresnan

Ivete Raquel Lucas is a Brazilian-Mexican-American documentary filmmaker, editor, and producer. She is known for her long-term collaboration with her partner, the filmmaker Patrick Bresnan, with whom she has co-directed a series of documentaries set in and around Pahokee, Florida, a rural town on Lake Okeechobee in the Florida Everglades. Lucas edits and co-produces the pair's films; their short documentaries The Send-Off (2016), The Rabbit Hunt (2017), Roadside Attraction (2017), and Skip Day (2018) premiered at the Sundance Film Festival, the Berlin International Film Festival, the Toronto International Film Festival, and the Directors' Fortnight at Cannes. Their first feature, Pahokee (2019), premiered in the Sundance documentary competition and was later broadcast on PBS.

Lucas and Bresnan co-directed the feature Naked Gardens (2022) and the short The Passing (2023), which won the Pardino d'oro for best auteur short film at the Locarno Film Festival. Lucas edited Bresnan's feature First They Came for My College (2026), which documents the political takeover of New College of Florida. She was named to Filmmaker magazine's 25 New Faces of Independent Film in 2016 and to DOC NYC's 40 Under 40 list in 2019. Alongside filmmaking, Lucas and Bresnan have exhibited photography, video, and installation work, often made with and about queer communities, under the names Ivete Lucas and Otis Ike.

== Early life ==
Lucas was born in São Paulo, Brazil, and grew up in Monterrey, Mexico. She received a Bachelor of Arts in communication science from the Universidad de Monterrey in 2006 and later earned a Master of Fine Arts in film and video production from the University of Texas at Austin in 2012. Her filmmaking career began in Mexico, where she co-directed the short film Asma (2008) as part of a filmmaking collective, with support from a Mexican Film Institute (IMCINE) grant; the film was shortlisted for an Ariel Award.

== Career ==
=== Early work (2008–2011) ===
After Asma, Lucas directed, produced, and edited the short documentary Mexican Fried Chicken (2010), about a fourteen-year-old Mexican immigrant balancing work and school in Texas; the film screened at the Boston Latino Film Festival, the New York Latino Film Festival, and the San Diego Latino Film Festival. Lucas and Bresnan co-directed the short The Curse and the Jubilee (2011), which depicts a Fourth of July celebration in Ivanhoe, Virginia, a former mining town; The Atlantic published the film online in 2018. Beginning in 2008, working with Bresnan as Otis Ike and Ivete Lucas, she also documented the subculture of Vietnam War re-enactors under the title One Big Misunderstanding; the project was presented as a photography, video, and performance installation at G Gallery in Houston, as part of the 2012 FotoFest Biennial, in March and April 2012. The pair also made One Big Misunderstanding (2015) as a feature documentary, which received a production grant from the Austin Film Society.

=== The Send-Off (2016) ===
The Send-Off, a short documentary about prom night in Pahokee, Florida, was co-directed by Lucas and Bresnan, with Lucas also editing. It premiered at the Sundance Film Festival in 2016 and screened at SXSW, the San Francisco International Film Festival, and AFI Fest. It won the Grand Jury Award for Texas Shorts at SXSW, a Golden Gate Award for best documentary short in San Francisco, and a jury award at AFI Fest. After its release, Filmmaker magazine named Lucas and Bresnan to its 25 New Faces of Independent Film list.

=== The Rabbit Hunt (2017) ===
The Rabbit Hunt, a 12-minute short produced, written, and edited by Lucas and directed by Bresnan, follows 17-year-old Chris and his family as they hunt rabbits in the sugar fields near Lake Okeechobee, where the hunt is a rite of passage among farmworker families. The film premiered at Sundance in January 2017 and had its international premiere in the Berlinale Shorts section of the Berlin International Film Festival. It won more than twenty festival awards, including a Cinema Eye Honors award, the SXSW Grand Jury Award for Texas Shorts, a second Golden Gate Award, the BFI London Film Festival Short Film Award, the Melbourne International Film Festival's award for best documentary short, the Sheffield Doc/Fest Short Doc Award, and the Silver Hugo at the Chicago International Film Festival; it was also nominated for an International Documentary Association award. In 2018, a companion exhibition of production stills and a re-edited version of the film was presented at Rice University's Rice Media Center Gallery in Houston.

=== Roadside Attraction (2017) ===
Roadside Attraction, co-directed by Lucas and Bresnan with Lucas also editing, observes a crowd of onlookers gathered to watch Air Force One. It premiered in competition at the Toronto International Film Festival in 2017 and screened in the United States at SXSW.

=== Skip Day (2018) ===
Skip Day, co-directed by Lucas and Bresnan with Lucas also editing, follows Pahokee high school seniors on a trip to the beach the day after prom. It had its world premiere at the Directors' Fortnight at the Cannes Film Festival, where it won the Illy Prize for short film, and was produced with the Guardian's documentary unit as executive producer.

=== Pahokee (2019) ===
Pahokee, the pair's first feature together, was co-directed by Lucas and Bresnan, with Lucas also producing and editing. It follows four high school seniors, Na'Kerria, Jocabed, Junior, and BJ, through their final year in the town. It premiered in the documentary competition at the Sundance Film Festival in January 2019 and its international premiere was at Visions du Réel. Monica Castillo of Remezcla praised its portrait of Black and Latino students in a rural farming community. The Hollywood Reporter and Variety also reviewed the film. Pahokee won Best Homegrown Feature at the Miami Film Festival and the Best Editing: Documentary Feature award for Lucas at the Ashland Independent Film Festival, and screened at more than fifty festivals. PBS broadcast it on February 16, 2021, as part of the America ReFramed series. Lucas was later named to DOC NYC's 40 Under 40 list, which cited Pahokee's Sundance premiere.

=== Happiness Is a Journey (2021) ===
Happiness Is a Journey, a short co-directed by Lucas and Bresnan and produced by The Guardian, follows Eddie "Bear" Lopez, a longtime newspaper carrier in East Austin, through a Christmas Eve shift at the warehouse where the papers are sorted. It had its world premiere at the Locarno Film Festival in August 2021 and screened at the BFI London Film Festival later that year. The following year, footage from the project was shown as an installation at Big Medium in Austin.

=== Naked Gardens (2022) ===
Naked Gardens, a feature co-directed by Lucas and Bresnan, portrays Sunsport Gardens, a family naturist resort in the Florida Everglades, as its residents prepare for the Mid-Winter Naturist Festival. The film premiered in the documentary competition at the Tribeca Festival on June 10, 2022, and had its European premiere at IDFA. The two directors filmed in the nude themselves as a condition of access to the community. The film won Best Documentary Feature at the Tallahassee Film Festival, the Grand Jury Award for Documentary at the New Hampshire Film Festival, and the Special Jury Prize for Excellence in American Profiles at SF IndieFest.

=== The Passing (2023) ===
The Passing, a short co-directed by Lucas and Bresnan with Lucas also editing, follows Michael Mullen, a house-call veterinarian in Austin, as he helps a neighbor through the end of her dog's life. The film premiered at the Locarno Film Festival, where it won the Pardino d'oro Swiss Life for best auteur short film, and had its North American premiere in the Short Cuts program at the Toronto International Film Festival. It screened at SXSW in 2024 and is distributed by The New Yorker.

=== First They Came for My College (2026) ===
First They Came for My College, directed by Bresnan and edited by Lucas, documents the 2023 conservative takeover of New College of Florida initiated by Governor Ron DeSantis. The film premiered at the True/False Film Festival in March 2026 and screened at SXSW, the Independent Film Festival Boston, DC/DOX, and the San Francisco International Film Festival.

== Visual art ==
Working under the names Ivete Lucas and Otis Ike (Bresnan's artist name), Lucas has exhibited photography, video, and installation work since 2009, often made in and with queer, immigrant, and working-class communities. In 2011, the pair's video and photography installation on Latin American drag performers and identity was one of the central works in Queer State(s) at the University of Texas at Austin's Visual Arts Center; the same installation paired the drag material with footage of a young boy in Ivanhoe, Virginia, the subject of The Curse and the Jubilee. Lucas has shown work at FotoFest in Houston three times: in the group show Nowhere Near Here: New Lens-Based Work from Texas (2011), curated by Toby Kamps and Michelle White of the Menil Collection; as part of One Big Misunderstanding at G Gallery during the 2012 FotoFest Biennial; and, solo, in Crónicas: Seven Contemporary Mexican Artists Confront the Drug War (2013). Other exhibitions include Libres y Lokas at Domy Books in Austin (2009), the subject of a cover story by Andy Campbell in Art Lies; Manifest Destiny at Richland College Gallery in Dallas (2010); L. Quan – Check Cashing & Healing Arts Centre at Ratio 3 in San Francisco (2015), curated by Barry McGee; Love Letters in a Tree at Lawndale Art Center in Houston (2014); Channel One at Ratio 3 (2018); Explorations of Place at Drawing Lines in Austin (2016); and Feels Like 97° at Oolite Arts in Miami (2021), a group show on South Florida life curated by Michelle Lisa Polissaint.

== Filmography ==
=== Features ===
Year	Title	Director	Editor	Notes
2015	One Big Misunderstanding	Yes	Yes	Co-directed with Patrick Bresnan
2019	Pahokee	Yes	Yes	Co-directed with Patrick Bresnan; also producer
2022	Naked Gardens	Yes	Yes	Co-directed with Patrick Bresnan
2026	First They Came for My College	No	Yes	Directed by Patrick Bresnan

=== Short films ===
Year	Title	Director	Editor	Notes
2008	Asma	Yes	Yes	Co-directed as part of a filmmaking collective
2010	Mexican Fried Chicken	Yes	Yes	Solo; also producer
2011	The Curse and the Jubilee	Yes	Yes	Co-directed with Patrick Bresnan
2016	The Send-Off	Yes	Yes	Co-directed with Patrick Bresnan
2017	The Rabbit Hunt	No	Yes	Directed by Patrick Bresnan; also producer and writer
2017	Roadside Attraction	Yes	Yes	Co-directed with Patrick Bresnan
2018	Skip Day	Yes	Yes	Co-directed with Patrick Bresnan
2021	Happiness Is a Journey	Yes	Yes	Co-directed with Patrick Bresnan
2023	The Passing	Yes	Yes	Co-directed with Patrick Bresnan

== Awards ==
Year	Award	Category	Work	Result	Ref.
2016	SXSW Film Festival	Grand Jury Award, Texas Shorts	The Send-Off	Won	
2016	San Francisco International Film Festival	Golden Gate Award for Best Documentary Short	The Send-Off	Won	
2016	Filmmaker magazine	25 New Faces of Independent Film	—	Won	
2017	SXSW Film Festival	Grand Jury Award, Texas Shorts	The Rabbit Hunt	Won	
2017	San Francisco International Film Festival	Golden Gate Award for Best Documentary Short	The Rabbit Hunt	Won	
2017	BFI London Film Festival	Short Film Award	The Rabbit Hunt	Won	
2017	Melbourne International Film Festival	Best Documentary Short Film	The Rabbit Hunt	Won	
2017	Chicago International Film Festival	Silver Hugo	The Rabbit Hunt	Won	
2017	Austin Chronicle Best of Austin	Best Local Creative Couple with a Discerning Eye	—	Won	
2018	Cinema Eye Honors	Nonfiction short filmmaking	The Rabbit Hunt	Won	
2018	Directors' Fortnight	Illy Prize for short film	Skip Day	Won	
2019	Miami Film Festival	Best Homegrown Feature	Pahokee	Won	
2019	Ashland Independent Film Festival	Best Editing: Documentary Feature	Pahokee	Won	
2019	DOC NYC	40 Under 40	—	Won	
2022	Tallahassee Film Festival	Best Documentary Feature	Naked Gardens	Won	
2022	New Hampshire Film Festival	Grand Jury Award, Documentary	Naked Gardens	Won	
2023	SF IndieFest	Special Jury Prize for Excellence in American Profiles	Naked Gardens	Won	
2023	Locarno Film Festival	Pardino d'oro Swiss Life for the Best Auteur Short Film	The Passing	Won	

== Personal life ==
Lucas is partnered with the filmmaker Patrick Bresnan, with whom she makes most of her films. The couple lived in Austin, Texas, for many years before moving to Asheville, North Carolina.
