= Garth Donovan =

American filmmaker (born 1976)

Garth Donovan (born 1976) is an American filmmaker and actor based in Boston, Massachusetts.

Garth Donovan wrote, directed and starred in the 2003 comedy Everyone's Got One which was voted 'New England's Best Comedy' by the Boston Society of Film Critics, and one of the best local films of 2003 by Gerald Peary of The Boston Phoenix. Donovan wrote and directed the 2010 film Phillip the Fossil, which won the SXSW Special Jury Award for Best Performance that year. Donovan gained notoriety for partially financing the production of the films by selling scrap metal.

Donovan attended Stonehill College in Easton, MA.
