= Marlo Poras =

American filmmaker (born 1971)

Marlo Poras (born 1971, Fort Campbell, Kentucky) is an American filmmaker.

== Early life and education ==
Poras was born on a US Army base in Fort Campbell, Kentucky and raised in Framingham, Massachusetts.

She graduated from Washington University in St. Louis in 1993 with a B.A. in History.

== Career ==
Poras worked as an apprentice to Thelma Schoonmaker at Martin Scorsese's Cappa Productions and was an apprentice and assistant editor on independent films such as Greg Mottola's Daytrippers and Alison Anders' Grace Of My Heart.

While living in Vietnam, Poras found the inspiration for her first film, Mai's America which was shown on PBS and was called the best documentary of 2002 by the Boston Phoenix and the best festival film of 2002 by the LA Times.

Her second film is Run Granny Run. Released by HBO in 2007, Run Granny Run is about the 2004 Senate campaign of then 94-year-old Doris 'Granny D' Haddock. The film won the Audience Award for Feature Documentary at the South by Southwest Film Festival.

In 2012, she released her film The Mosuo Sisters contrasting modern life and the life of the Mosuo people of western China through the lives of two sisters.

== Awards ==
In 2004, she was the recipient of a Guggenheim Fellowship.
