= Eric Patrick =

American film director

- Born: Port Arthur, TX

Eric Patrick is an independent filmmaker, freelance animator, Guggenheim fellow, musician, and educator. He is currently a tenured professor in the Radio-TV-Film program at Northwestern University.

Originally from Port Arthur, Texas, he played in a band throughout the Southern United States before he studied art and film at the University of New Mexico in Albuquerque. He completed his MFA in experimental animation at California Institute of the Arts (1997).

== Films ==
Patrick's films focus on low-tech, traditional, film-based techniques to explore ideas of consciousness and decay. According to the Southern Arts Federation, his films are "filled with eerily beautiful visuals that evoke a surreal, otherworldly feel which is complemented by the absence of a traditional narrative." He has been awarded grants from the John Simon Guggenheim Memorial Foundation, the Texas Filmmakers’ Production Fund, and The Rooftop Film Fund.

His films have won awards at The Black Maria Film Festival, The Humboldt International Film Festival, Semana de Cine Experimental de Madrid, South by Southwest Film Festival (SXSW), The Ann Arbor Film Festival, U.S.A. Film Festival, Big Muddy Film Festival, and Festival de Cinema Independent de Barcelona.

His filmwork includes Stark Film (1997), Ablution (2001), and Startle Pattern (2005).

== Animation ==
Patrick has also worked as a commercial animator, most prominently for the Nickelodeon program Blue's Clues. He has taught film and animation production at the University of Texas Austin, University of North Carolina Greensboro, and Northwestern University. His writing on animated documentaries and on ritual in animation have appeared in Animac journal.
