= Jesse Moss =

Jesse Moss may refer to:

- Jesse Moss (actor) (born 1983), Canadian actor
- Jesse Moss (filmmaker), American documentary filmmaker and cinematographer, active 2002–present

== See also ==
- Jessy Moss, English-born, Australian-raised American female singer/rapper active 2002–present
