= Karin Fong =

Television director

Karin Fong is an American Emmy Award-winning director and designer based in Los Angeles, California. She is a co-founder of Imaginary Forces, a design studio and creative agency best known for its portfolio of work in main title design for television series and motion pictures. Fong was awarded the 2018 AIGA Medal, the highest distinction in the field of graphic design in the U.S., in recognition of her achievements as a visual storyteller, motion graphics designer, and director.

== Early life ==
Fong was born in 1971 in Canoga Park in Los Angeles, California. She was a kid who liked to draw and create stop-motion films. She credited Sesame Street as an early influence sparking her interest in creating animations that combined live action, sound, and pictures.

Fong graduated from Yale University with a Bachelor's degree in art. During college, she made a project that led her to start her career in WGBH Public Television. Her first job at WGBH was as animator for the PBS show "Where is the World Is Carmen Sandiego?"

== Career ==
In 1990s Fong moved back to LA and got a job at the West Coast branch of the advertising agency R/Greenberg Associates (RGA/LA), a studio known for designing opening title sequences for films like Seven, Die Hard, Alien, and Ghostbusters. In 1996, RGA/LA changed its name to Imaginary Forces (stylized as IF) with Fong becoming the founding member of the new studio. Working at Imaginary Forces, Fong met Joseph McGinty Nichol as her client.

Joseph McGinty Nichol suggested her a job as creative officer at his American production company, Wonderland Sound and Vision in 2001 and started to work more with him.

Fong is a member of the Alliance Graphique Internationale (AGI).

== Contributions ==
Karin Fong has contributed to various title designs for film and television.

- The Island of Dr.Moreau (1996)
- Mimic (1997)
- Dead Man on Campus (1998)
- Charlie's Angels (2000)
- Daredevil (2003)
- Hellboy (2004)
- Charlotte's Web (2006)
- Terminator: Salvation (2009)
- Boardwalk Empire (2010)
- Rubicon (2010)
- Black Sails (2014)
- Counterpart (2017)

== Awards and nominations ==
=== Television Academy awards ===
Year	Nominated work	Category	Result
2001	Masterpiece Theatre American Collection	Outstanding Main Title Design	Won
2008	Chuck	Outstanding Main Title Design	Nominated
2010	Human Target	Outstanding Main Title Design	Nominated
2011	Rubicon	Outstanding Main Title Design	Nominated
2011	Boardwalk Empire	Outstanding Main Title Design	Nominated
2014	Black Sails	Outstanding Main Title Design	Nominated
2018	Counterpart	Outstanding Main Title Design	Won
2022	Lisey's Story	Outstanding Main Title Design	Nominated
2022	Cowboy Bebop	Outstanding Main Title Design	Nominated

=== SXSW film festival awards ===
Year	Nominated work	Category	Result
2016	Hickey	Excellence in Title Design	Nominated
2018	Counterpart	Excellence in Title Design	Won
2020	Tell Me a Story	Excellence in Title Design	Nominated
2020	See	Excellence in Title Design	Won
