= First They Came for My College =

2026 American documentary film

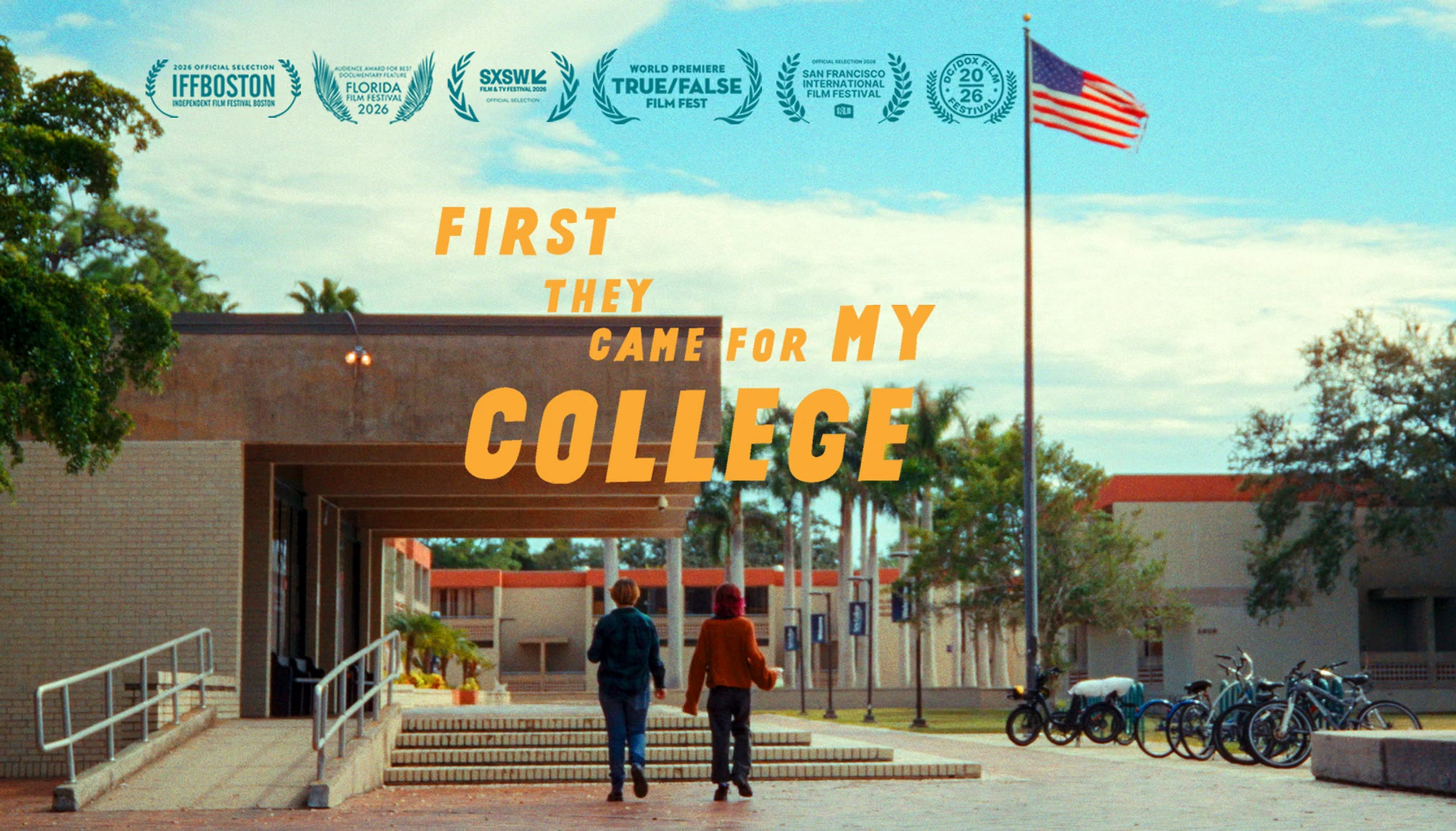
- Official poster
- Directed by: Patrick Bresnan
- Produced by: Patrick Bresnan; Holly Herrick; Harry W. Hanbury; Zackary Drucker
- Starring: Gaby Batista; Chloe Rusek; Tracy Fero; Libby Harrity; Isaac Tellechea; Maria Vesperi; Dylan Niner; Lindsey Jennings; Joshua Janniere; Amy Reid
- Cinematography: Patrick Bresnan; Sara Kinney; Daniel Raphael Potthast
- Edited by: Leah Marino; Ivete Lucas
- Music by: Michael Montes
- Production companies: Harry Hanbury Productions; Otis Lucas Productions
- Release date: March 6, 2026 (True/False Film Fest)
- Running time: 105 minutes
- Country: United States
- Language: English
- Box office: $17,222

First They Came for My College is a 2026 American documentary film directed and produced by Patrick Bresnan. It is about New College of Florida, the state's public honors college, in the period after Governor Ron DeSantis appointed six conservative trustees to its board of trustees in January 2023. The film covers roughly the first year and a half under the new leadership, following students, faculty, and the staff of the student newspaper.

Bresnan shot the film in a vérité style, combining his own footage with board meeting recordings and video shot by students. The film treats what happened at New College as an early instance of a wider political campaign against public higher education.

First They Came for My College had its world premiere at the True/False Film Fest in Columbia, Missouri, on March 6, 2026. It played SXSW as its Texas premiere and later screened at the Florida Film Festival, the San Francisco International Film Festival, Independent Film Festival Boston, RiverRun International Film Festival, and DC/DOX. It runs 105 minutes.

The film won the Audience Award for Best Documentary Feature at the 2026 Florida Film Festival.

== Synopsis ==
The film opens with the January 2023 change in leadership at New College of Florida, a small public liberal arts college in Sarasota. The filmmakers describe the appointments as a hostile takeover timed to the run-up to DeSantis's 2024 presidential campaign. The new trustees included Christopher Rufo and Matthew Spalding. The board removed president Patricia Okker and installed Richard Corcoran, the state's former education commissioner, in her place.

What follows is the conflict between the new administration and the students, faculty, alumni, and organizers who opposed it. The film watches this from inside the campus rather than from outside it, moving between the student newspaper The Catalyst, classrooms, board meetings, protests, faculty organizing, the student-run food forest and garden, and a student production of The Rocky Horror Show. Students also record their own experiences, and that footage carries much of the film.

The core of the story is what happens when political control of an institution changes faster than its culture does. Students and professors try to hold onto the academic model and campus traditions while decisions from above reach tenure, gender studies, diversity programs, student spaces, athletics, and even the choice of a new mascot. A late sequence follows a hurricane that hit the bayside campus, including student video of the wrecked community garden.

== Production ==
Producers are Patrick Bresnan, Holly Herrick, Harry W. Hanbury, and Zackary Drucker. Leah Marino and Ivete Lucas edited the film and Michael Montes composed the score. Bresnan and Sara Kinney are credited as directors of photography, with Daniel Raphael Potthast as cinematographer, though festival programs often list all three together under cinematography.

The Austin Chronicle reported that Herrick, a New College alumna and head of film and creative media at the Austin Film Society, got involved after the takeover was announced and went to Bresnan because she thought the subject needed a filmmaker willing to understand New College as a place and a community. Bresnan had previously directed or co-directed Pahokee, Naked Gardens, The Rabbit Hunt, and Skip Day.

His first idea was a short film about the attempt to remove student body president Libby Harrity from office, but he decided the story was bigger than that. He spent about a year getting to know the campus, according to the Chronicle, filming in the food forest, the garden, and the newspaper offices, and giving students iPhones so they could shoot their own material. PEN America reported that the finished film draws on hundreds of hours of footage, a good portion of it shot by students.

Bresnan told The Guardian that he saw his job as helping the students tell the story themselves, and that having students behind the camera closed some of the usual distance between filmmaker and subject.

== Music ==
Michael Montes composed the score. He had previously worked with Bresnan on Naked Gardens.

== Release ==
The film premiered at the True/False Film Fest in Columbia, Missouri, on March 6, 2026, with three screenings there through March 8. Okker, who taught at the University of Missouri and served as dean of its College of Arts and Sciences before going to New College, returned to Columbia to introduce it.

Its Texas premiere came at SXSW in Austin, Texas, in the Documentary Spotlight section. The Austin Chronicle listed screenings at Alamo Lamar, AFS Cinema, and the Rollins Theatre at the Long Center.

The Florida premiere was a sold-out screening at the Enzian Theater near Orlando on April 11, 2026, part of the Florida Film Festival, where the film won the Audience Award for Best Documentary Feature. Bresnan, producer Harry W. Hanbury, and more than a hundred New College alumni and students attended. It went on to Independent Film Festival Boston, RiverRun International Film Festival, the Ashland Independent Film Festival, the San Francisco International Film Festival, and DC/DOX, where it had its Washington premiere with a discussion afterward with Bresnan.

The filmmakers say the film is available to festivals and that theatrical, campus, and community screenings are planned for later in 2026.

On June 7, 2026, HBO's Last Week Tonight with John Oliver gave its main segment to the conservative takeover of New College. Oliver covered the changes made under the DeSantis-appointed trustees and Corcoran, among them the closure of the gender studies program, faculty departures, athletic recruitment, admissions practices, and rising administrative costs.

== Reception ==
=== Critical response ===
Ainsley Bryson of The Maneater, reviewing the world premiere, wrote that the film "feels like a war movie" and contrasted Bresnan's wide-angle campus photography with the raw iPhone video the students shot. The Guardian called it gripping and made a similar point about the immediacy of that footage. Vox Magazine wrote that the film's answer to the campaign it documents is the friendship among the students. A reviewer for The Michigan Daily noted that a documentary shot mostly on phones ends up with vertical framing and shaky handheld shots, which gave the lighter scenes a quality the reviewer found endearing.

Christopher Llewellyn Reed of Hammer to Nail read the film as a warning about political attempts to remake educational institutions, and singled out Amy Reid, Harrity, and student Joshua Janniere. Valerie Kalfrin of the Alliance of Women Film Journalists praised the sense that the takeover unfolds close to real time. Writing in Ms., a reviewer described the film as almost unbearable at times in its account of a public institution being taken apart, but was struck by the insistence on community and joy running alongside it.

Not all of the response was favorable. Stephen Saito of The Moveable Fest found the film compelling but thought it takes on more storylines than it can do justice to. Sean Boelman of Hyperreal Film Club praised its focus on students and called it emotional, while arguing that Bresnan's commitment to vérité leaves the film aimless in places, and that viewers who are not students, academics, or Floridians may not feel the urgency of the story.

PEN America wrote that the film presents the takeover of a college of 700 students as a template for similar efforts elsewhere.

=== Accolades ===
Awards and festival selections for First They Came for My College
Year	Award / festival	Category / status	Recipient(s)	Result
2026	True/False Film Fest	World premiere	First They Came for My College	Selected
2026	SXSW Film & TV Festival	Official selection (Documentary Spotlight; Texas premiere)	First They Came for My College	Selected
2026	Florida Film Festival	Audience Award for Best Documentary Feature	First They Came for My College; director Patrick Bresnan	Won
2026	Independent Film Festival Boston	Official selection	First They Came for My College	Selected
2026	San Francisco International Film Festival	Official selection (California premiere)	First They Came for My College	Selected
2026	DC/DOX Film Festival	Official selection (DC premiere)	First They Came for My College	Selected
