= Siddhartha Khosla =

American film and television composer

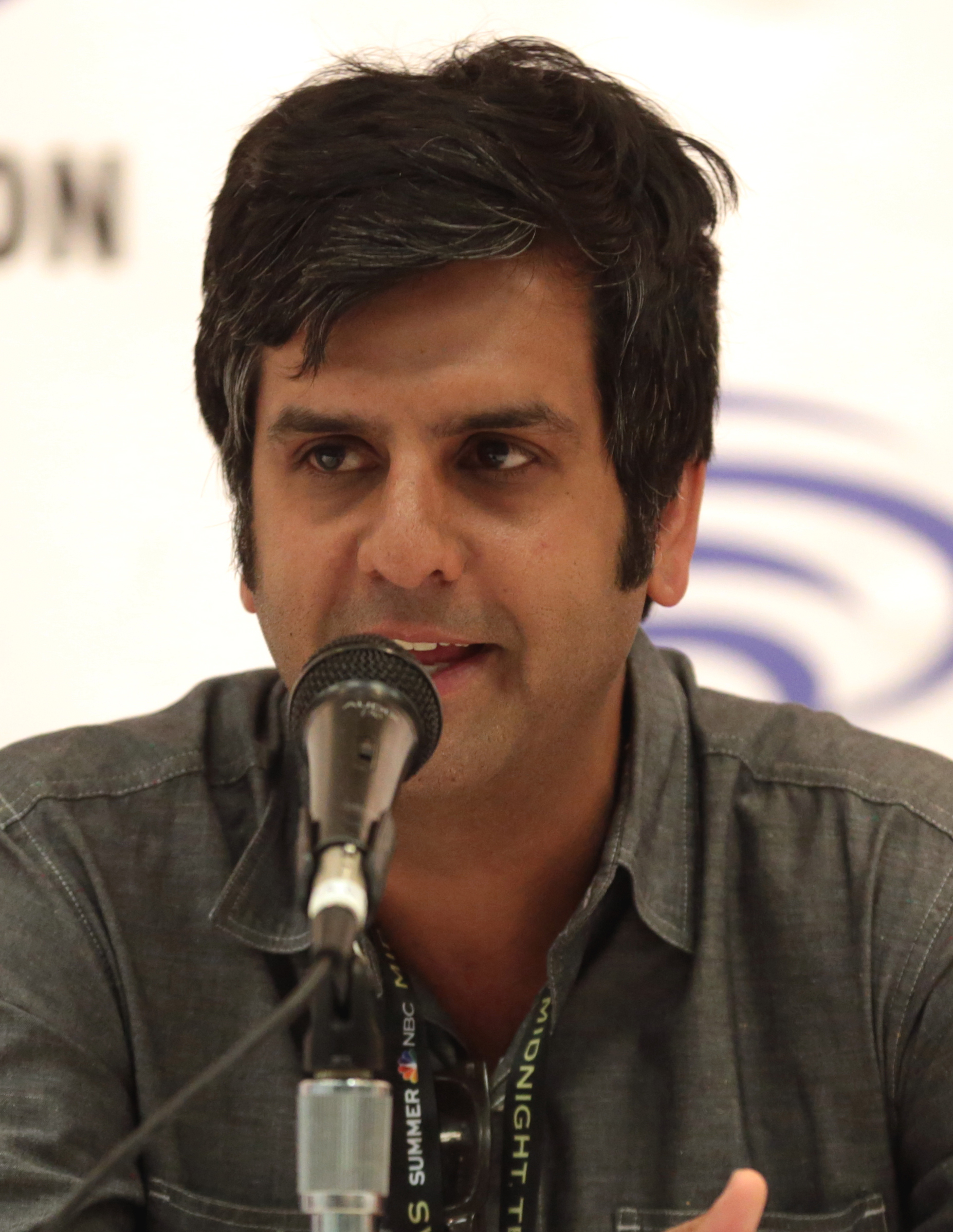

Background information
- Born: Siddhartha Dinesh Khosla; January 2, 1977 (age 49); Tenafly, New Jersey, U.S.
- Genre: Film and television scores
- Occupation: Composer
- Years active: 2008–present

Siddhartha Dinesh Khosla (born January 2, 1977 in Tenafly, New Jersey) is an American film and television composer and founder of the band Goldspot. He is of Indian origin. He was raised for the early years of his life in India with his grandparents, then was raised in the US.

== Works ==
=== Film ===
| Year | Title | Director(s) | Notes |
|---|---|---|---|
| 2009 | The President Is Coming | Kunaal Roy Kapur | |
| 2017 | The Sounding | Catherine Eaton | |
| 2017 | Fat Camp | Jennifer Arnold | |
| 2019 | Beats | Chris Robinson | |
| 2021 | Queenpins | Aron Gaudet & Gita Pullapilly | |
| 2022 | I Want You Back | Jason Orley | |
| 2022 | Awayy | Aqsa Altaf & John X. Carey | Short film |
| 2023 | Your Place or Mine | Aline Brosh McKenna | |
| 2023 | Gulmohar | Rahul V. Chittella | |
| 2024 | The Idea of You | Michael Showalter | |
| 2024 | A Family Affair | Richard LaGravenese | |
| 2025 | Oh. What. Fun. | Michael Showalter | |
| 2025 | A Very Jonas Christmas Movie | Jessica Yu | |
| 2026 | Swapped | Nathan Greno | First score for an animated film |

=== Television ===
| Year | Title | Creator(s) / Host(s) | Notes |
|---|---|---|---|
| 2012 | Today's Special: New York Indian | Aasif Mandvi & Madhur Jaffrey | Television film |
| 2013–2014 | The Neighbors | Dan Fogelman | 22 episodes (Season 2) |
| 2015 | Untitled NBA Project | John Fortenberry | Television film |
| 2015–2016 | Grandfathered | Daniel Chun | All episodes |
| 2015–2018 | The Royals | Mark Schwahn | All episodes |
| 2016 | Square Roots | Michael Fresco | Unaired pilot |
| 2016 | Chunk & Bean | Chris Koch | Unaired pilot |
| 2016–2022 | This Is Us | Dan Fogelman (2) | All episodes 3 BMI TV Music Awards (2017-2019) 2 ASCAP Awards for Top Television Series (2020-2021) |
| 2017 | Controversy | Glenn Ficarra & John Requa | Unaired pilot |
| 2017–2019 | Runaways (TV series) | Josh Schwartz & Stephanie Savage | Theme music |
| 2017–2018 | Me, Myself & I | Dan Kopelman | All episodes |
| 2017–2019 | Runaways | Josh Schwartz & Stephanie Savage | All episodes 2 BMI TV Music Awards (2019-2020) |
| 2018-2019 | Rel | Lil Rel Howery & Kevin Barnett† | All episodes |
| 2018-2019 | The Kids Are Alright | Tim Doyle | All episodes |
| 2019 | Looking for Alaska | Josh Schwartz (2) | All episodes |
| 2019 | Sunnyside | Kal Penn & Matt Murray | All episodes |
| 2019–2023 | Nancy Drew | Noga Landau, Josh Schwartz (3) & Stephanie Savage (2) | All episodes; Co-composer with Jeff Garber |
| 2020 | The Baker and the Beauty | Dean Georgaris | Episode: "Pilot" |
| 2020 | Launchpad | Aqsa Altaf (2) | Episode: "American Eid" |
| 2020–2022 | Love, Victor | Isaac Aptaker & Elizabeth Berger | All episodes; Co-composer with Lauren Culjak |
| 2021-2023 | With Love | Gloria Calderón Kellett | All episodes; Co-composer with Lauren Culjak |
| 2021– | Only Murders in the Building | Steve Martin & John Robert Hoffman | All episodes ASCAP Award for Top Television Series (2022) ASCAP Award for Top Streaming Series (2023) ASCAP Composers' Choice Award for Top Streaming Series (2024) ASCAP Composers' Choice Award for Television Theme of the Year (2024) Primetime Emmy Award for Outstanding Music Composition for a Series (Original Dramatic Score) (2024; Episode: "Sitzprobe") |
| 2022 | The Mysterious Benedict Society | Phil Hay & Matt Manfredi | 6 episodes (Season 2) |
| 2022–2023 | Welcome to Chippendales | Robert Siegel | All episodes |
| 2023 | Rabbit Hole | Glenn Ficarra (2) & John Requa (2) | All episodes |
| 2023 | The Company You Keep | Julia Cohen | All episodes; Co-composer with Jeff Garber |
| 2023 | The Horror of Dolores Roach | Aaron Mark | All episodes |
| 2024 | No Good Deed | Liz Feldman | All episodes |
| 2024- | Elsbeth | Robert & Michelle King | 27 episodes; Co-composer with Garrett Gonzales |
| 2025- | Paradise | Dan Fogelman (3) | All episodes |
| 2026 | Imperfect Women | Annie Weisman | All episodes |

=== Stage ===
| Year | Title | Playwright | Director | Venue |
|---|---|---|---|---|
| 2022 | The Father and the Assassin | Anupama Chandrasekhar | Indhu Rubasingham | Royal National Theatre |

== Discography ==
- Runaways (Original Score) (2018)
- This Is Us: Original Score (2018)
- Looking for Alaska: Music from the Original Series (2019)
- This Is Us Season 3: Original Score (2019)
- This Is Us Season 4: Original Score (2020)
- Only Murders in the Building: Original Score (2021)
- Queenpins: Original Motion Picture Soundtrack (2021)
- This Is Us Seasons 5 & 6: Original Score (2022)
- Only Murders in the Building: Season 2 Original Score (2022)
- Welcome to Chippendales: Original Score (2022)
- Your Place or Mine: Soundtrack from the Netflix Film (2023)
- Rabbit Hole: Original Series Soundtrack (2023)
- The Horror of Dolores Roach: Prime Video Original Series Soundtrack (2023, with Garrett Gonzales)
- National Theatre: The Father and the Assassin (2023, additional music by David Shrubsole)
- Only Murders in the Building: Season 3 Original Soundtrack (2023)
- The Idea of You: Original Motion Picture Score (2024)
- A Family Affair: Soundtrack from the Netflix Film (2024, additional music by Alan Demoss)
- Only Murders in the Building: Season 4 Original Score (2024)
- No Good Deed: Soundtrack from the Netflix Series (2024, additional music by Alan Demoss)
- Paradise: Original Soundtrack (2025)
