= 36th Independent Spirit Awards =

US film awards ceremony in 2021

- Awarded for: Best in independent film and independent television
- Date: April 22, 2021
- Site: Santa Monica Pier; Santa Monica, California, U.S.
- Hosted by: Melissa Villaseñor

Highlights
- Best Feature: Nomadland
- Most awards: Film: Nomadland (4); TV: I May Destroy You / Unorthodox (2)
- Most nominations: Film: Never Rarely Sometimes Always (7); TV: Little America / Unorthodox (3)

Television coverage
- Channel: IFC

The 36th Film Independent Spirit Awards, honoring the best independent films and television series of 2020, were presented by Film Independent on April 22, 2021. Though it was initially intended for the ceremony to air on April 24, 2021, it was later changed to April 22, 2021. The nominations were announced on January 26, 2021 by Laverne Cox, Barry Jenkins, and Olivia Wilde. The ceremony was televised in the United States on IFC and streamed exclusively by AMC+. Melissa Villaseñor hosted the ceremony.

== Expansion ==
This year, the Film Independent expanded categories in order to honor television series for the first time, debuting five new categories: Best New Scripted Series, Best New Non-Scripted or Documentary Series, Best Male Performance in a New Scripted Series, Best Female Performance in a New Scripted Series, and Best Ensemble Cast in a New Scripted Series.

== Winners and nominees ==
=== Film ===
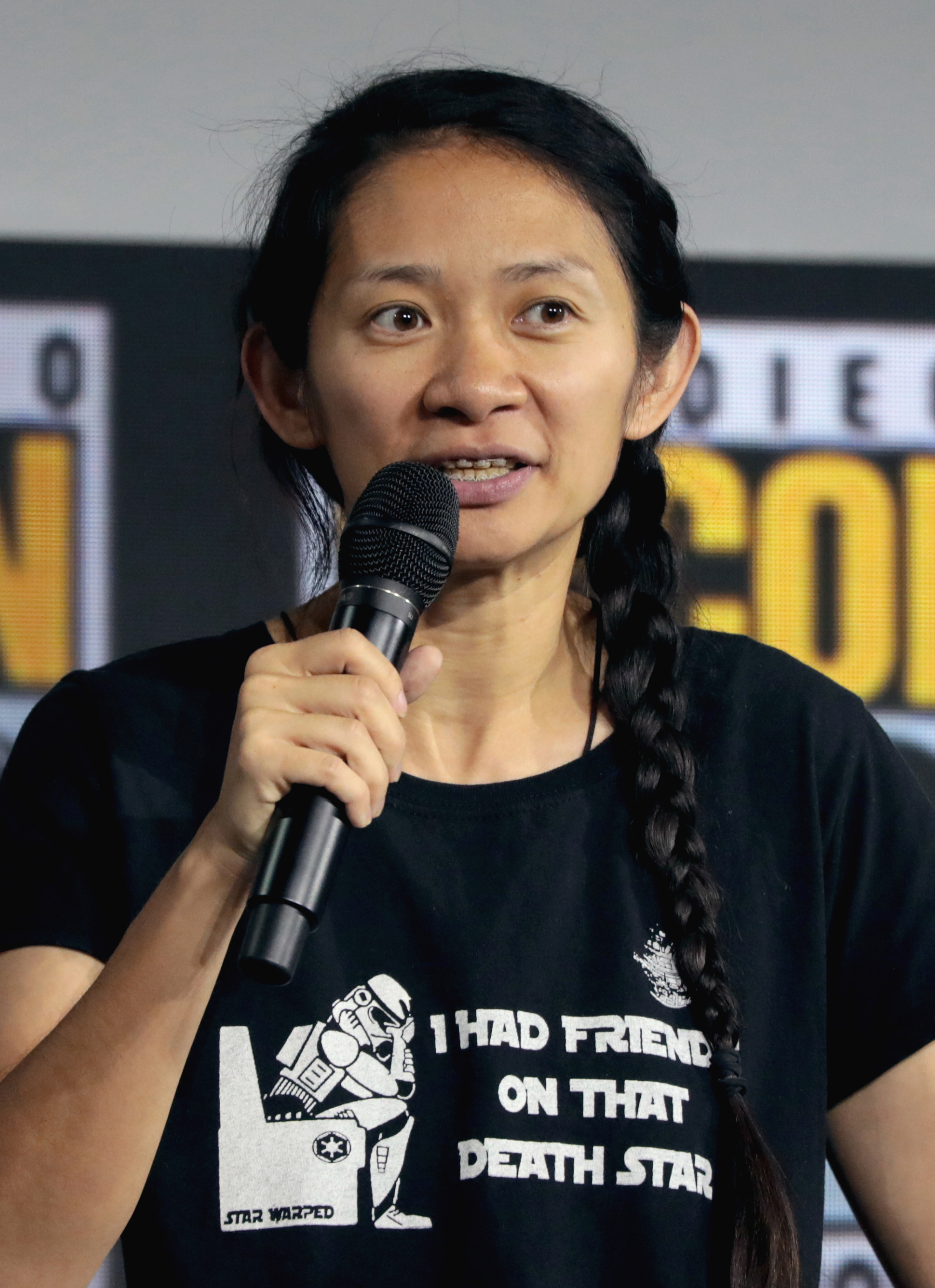
Chloé Zhao, Best Feature co-winner, and Best Director and Best Editing winner

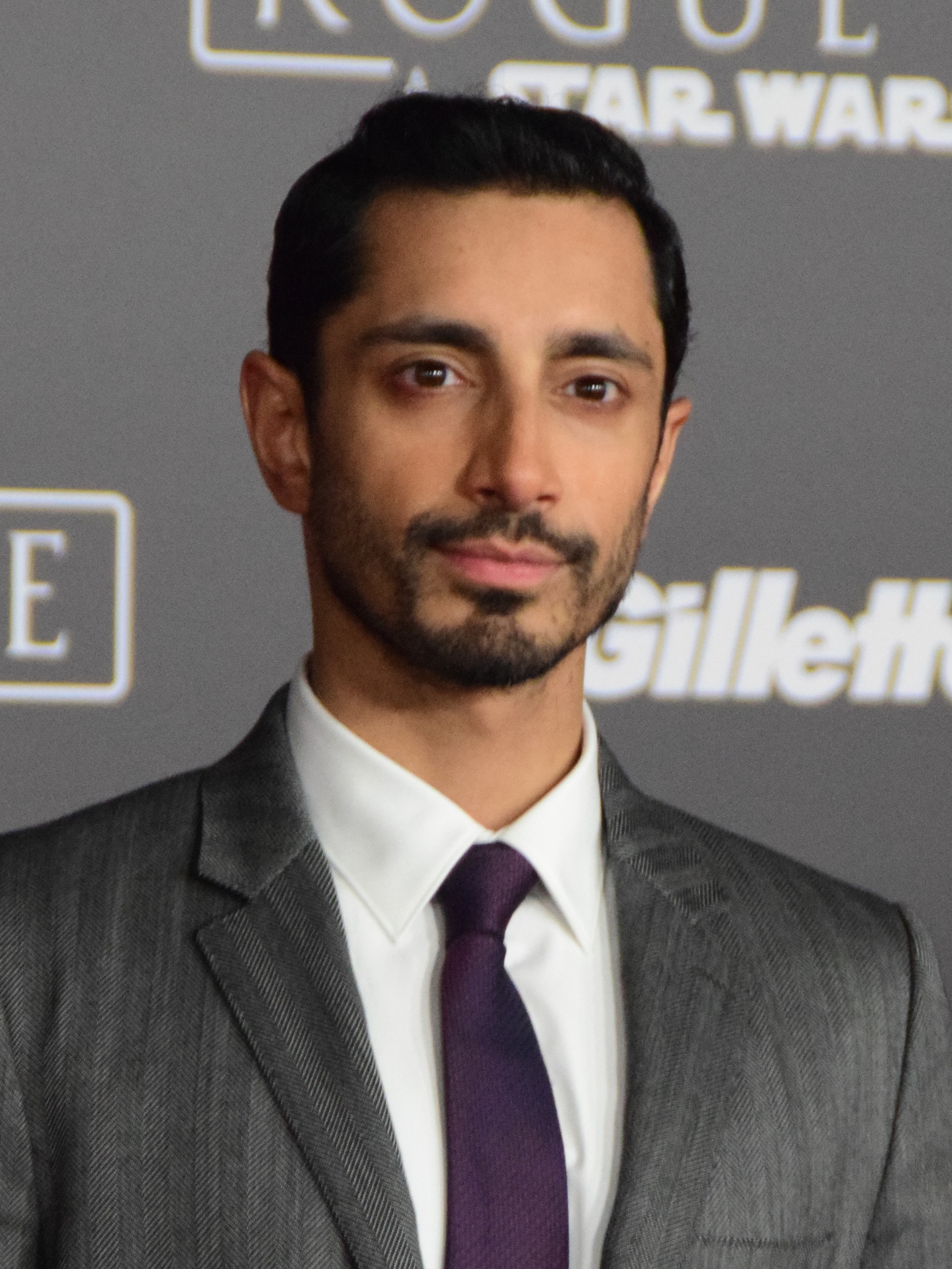
Riz Ahmed, Best Male Lead winner

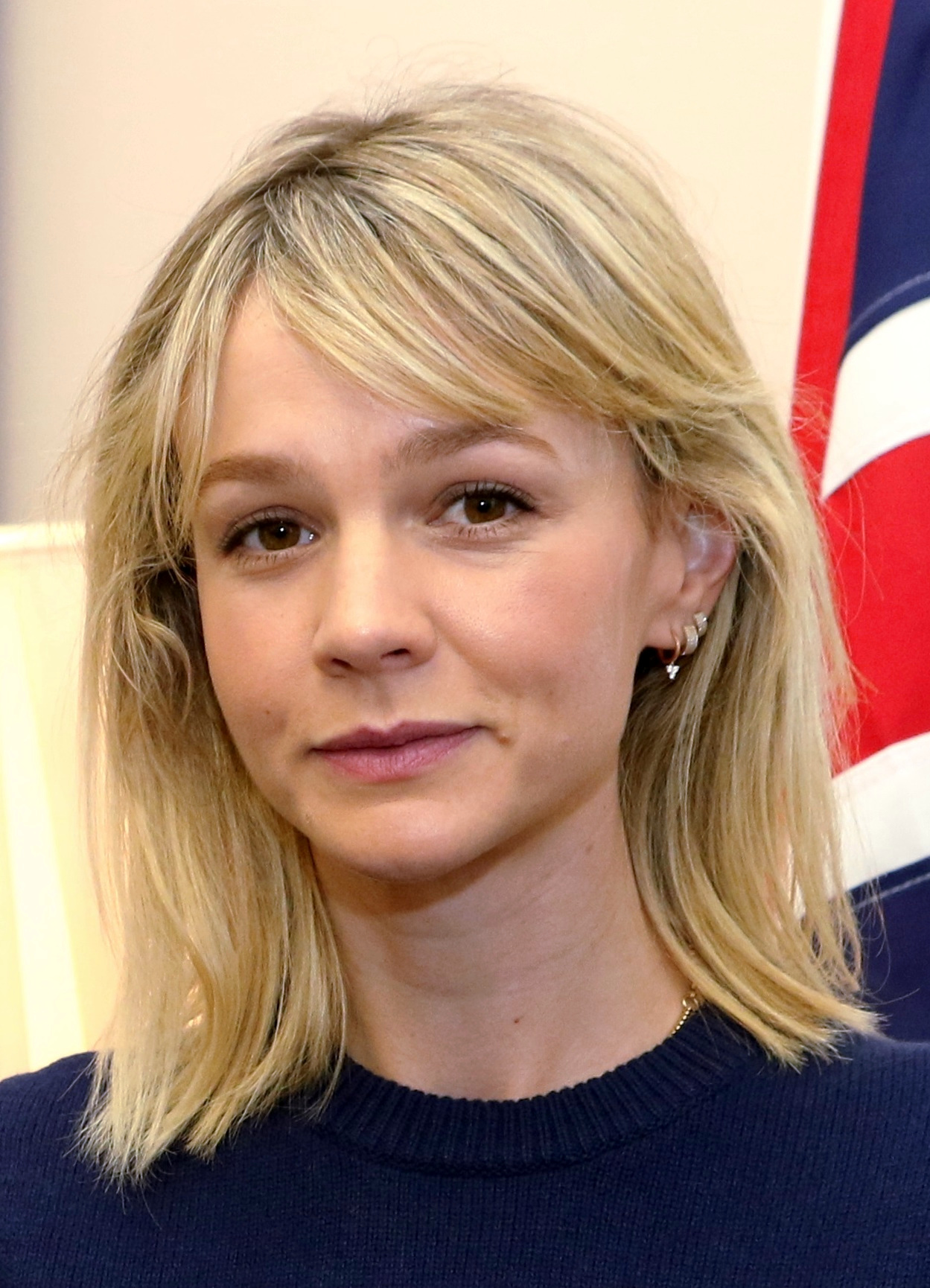
Carey Mulligan, Best Female Lead winner

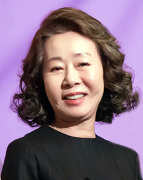
Youn Yuh-jung, Best Supporting Female winner

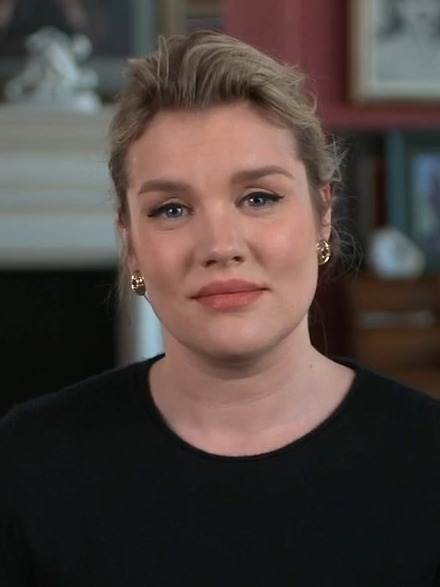
Emerald Fennell, Best Screenplay winner

Best Feature	Best Director
Nomadland: First Cow; Ma Rainey's Black Bottom; Minari; Never Rarely Sometimes Always	Chloé Zhao – Nomadland: Lee Isaac Chung – Minari; Emerald Fennell – Promising Young Woman; Eliza Hittman – Never Rarely Sometimes Always; Kelly Reichardt – First Cow
Best Male Lead	Best Female Lead
Riz Ahmed – Sound of Metal as Ruben Stone: Chadwick Boseman – Ma Rainey's Black Bottom as Levee Green (posthumous); Adarsh Gourav – The White Tiger as Balram Halwai; Rob Morgan – Bull as Abe; Steven Yeun – Minari as Jacob Yi	Carey Mulligan – Promising Young Woman as Cassandra "Cassie" Thomas: Nicole Beharie – Miss Juneteenth as Turquoise Jones; Viola Davis – Ma Rainey's Black Bottom as Ma Rainey; Sidney Flanigan – Never Rarely Sometimes Always as Autumn Callahan; Julia Garner – The Assistant as Jane; Frances McDormand – Nomadland as Fern
Best Supporting Male	Best Supporting Female
Paul Raci – Sound of Metal as Joe: Colman Domingo – Ma Rainey's Black Bottom as Cutler; Orion Lee – First Cow as King-Lu; Glynn Turman – Ma Rainey's Black Bottom as Toledo; Benedict Wong – Nine Days as Kyo	Youn Yuh-jung – Minari as Soon-ja: Alexis Chikaeze – Miss Juneteenth as Kai Jones; Yeri Han – Minari as Monica Yi; Valerie Mahaffey – French Exit as Madame Reynaud; Talia Ryder – Never Rarely Sometimes Always as Skylar
Best Screenplay	Best First Screenplay
Emerald Fennell – Promising Young Woman: Lee Isaac Chung – Minari; Eliza Hittman – Never Rarely Sometimes Always; Mike Makowsky – Bad Education; Alice Wu – The Half of It	Andy Siara – Palm Springs: Kitty Green – The Assistant; Noah Hutton – Lapsis; Channing Godfrey Peoples – Miss Juneteenth; James Sweeney – Straight Up
Best First Feature	Best Documentary Feature
Darius Marder – Sound of Metal: Radha Blank – The Forty-Year-Old Version; Heidi Ewing – I Carry You with Me; Edson Oda – Nine Days; Channing Godfrey Peoples – Miss Juneteenth	Crip Camp: Collective; Dick Johnson Is Dead; The Mole Agent; Time
Best Cinematography	Best Editing
Joshua James Richards – Nomadland: Jay Keitel – She Dies Tomorrow; Shabier Kirchner – Bull; Michael Latham – The Assistant; Hélène Louvart – Never Rarely Sometimes Always	Chloé Zhao – Nomadland: Andy Canny – The Invisible Man; Scott Cummings – Never Rarely Sometimes Always; Merawi Gerima – Residue; Enat Sidi – I Carry You with Me
Best International Film
Quo Vadis, Aida? (Bosnia and Herzegovina): Bacurau (Brazil); The Disciple (India); Night of the Kings (Ivory Coast); Preparations to Be Together for an Unknown Period of Time (Hungary)

=== Films with multiple nominations and awards ===
Films that received multiple nominations
Nominations	Film
7	Never Rarely Sometimes Always
6	Minari
5	Ma Rainey's Black Bottom
5	Nomadland
4	Miss Juneteenth
3	The Assistant
3	Bull
3	First Cow
3	Promising Young Woman
3	Sound of Metal
2	I Carry You with Me
2	Nine Days
2	Residue

Films that won multiple awards
Awards	Film
4	Nomadland
3	Sound of Metal
2	Promising Young Woman

=== Television ===
Best New Scripted Series	Best New Non-Scripted or Documentary Series
I May Destroy You (BBC One / HBO): Little America (Apple TV+); Small Axe (Prime Video); A Teacher (FX on Hulu); Unorthodox (Netflix)	Immigration Nation (Netflix): Atlanta's Missing and Murdered: The Lost Children (HBO); City So Real (National Geographic); Love Fraud (Showtime); We're Here (HBO)
Best Male Performance in a New Scripted Series	Best Female Performance in a New Scripted Series
Amit Rahav – Unorthodox as Yakov "Yanky" Shapiro (Netflix): Adam Ali – Little America as Zain (Apple TV+); Nicco Annan – P-Valley as Uncle Clifford (Starz); Conphidance – Little America as Iwegbuna (Apple TV+); Harold Torres – ZeroZeroZero as Manuel Contreras (Prime Video)	Shira Haas – Unorthodox as Esther "Esty" Shapiro (Netflix): Elle Fanning – The Great as Catherine the Great (Hulu); Abby McEnany – Work in Progress as Abby (Showtime); Maitreyi Ramakrishnan – Never Have I Ever as Devi Vishwakumar (Netflix); Jordan Kristine Seamón – We Are Who We Are as Caitlin Poythress / Harper (HBO)
Best Ensemble Cast in a New Scripted Series
I May Destroy You – Michaela Coel, Paapa Essiedu, Weruche Opia, and Stephen Wight

=== Series with multiple nominations and awards ===
Series that received multiple nominations
Nominations	Series
3	Little America
3	Unorthodox
2	I May Destroy You

Series that won multiple awards
Awards	Series
2	I May Destroy You
2	Unorthodox

== Special awards ==
=== John Cassavetes Award ===
(The award is given to the best feature made for under $500,000; recipients are the writer, director, and producer)

Residue

- The Killing of Two Lovers
- La Leyenda Negra
- Lingua Franca
- Saint Frances

=== Robert Altman Award ===
(The award is given to its film director, casting director, and ensemble cast)

- One Night in Miami... – Regina King, Kimberly R. Hardin, Kingsley Ben-Adir, Eli Goree, Aldis Hodge, and Leslie Odom Jr.

== Emerging Filmmakers Awards ==
=== Producers Award ===
The award honors emerging producers, who despite highly limited resources demonstrate the creativity, tenacity, and vision required to create quality independent films. The winner receives a $25,000 unrestricted cash grant courtesy of Spirit Award Premier Sponsors Genesis Motor North America.

- Gerry Kim
  - Kara Durrett
  - Lucas Joaquin

=== Someone to Watch Award ===
The award honors a talented filmmaker of singular vision who has not yet received appropriate recognition. The winner receives a $25,000 unrestricted cash grant courtesy of Spirit Award Premier Sponsors Genesis Motor North America.

- Ekwa Msangi – Farewell Amor
  - David Midell – The Killing of Kenneth Chamberlain
  - Annie Silverstein – Bull

=== Truer than Fiction Award ===
The award honors to an emerging director of non-fiction features who has not yet received appropriate recognition. The winner receives a $25,000 unrestricted cash grant courtesy of Spirit Award Premier Sponsors Genesis Motor North America.

- Elegance Bratton – Pier Kids
  - Cecilia Aldarondo – Landfall
  - Elizabeth Lo – Stray

== See also ==
- 93rd Academy Awards
- 78th Golden Globe Awards
- 74th British Academy Film Awards
- 41st Golden Raspberry Awards
- 27th Screen Actors Guild Awards
- 26th Critics' Choice Awards
