= Gene Jones (actor) =

American actor

- Born: Louisiana, U.S.
- Occupation: Actor
- Years active: 1990–present

Gene Jones is an American character actor, who appeared in No Country for Old Men (2007), The Hateful Eight (2015) and The Sacrament (2013), with the latter earning him a nomination for a Fangoria Chainsaw Award as Best Supporting Actor.

== Biography ==
Jones grew up in Olla, Louisiana, and attended LaSalle High School.

He acted in theater productions for nearly 30 years before being cast in No Country for Old Men (2007) as the gas station proprietor who is forced to play a game of "heads or tails" with killer Anton Chigurh. In a later interview, co-star Javier Bardem described Jones's performance in their scene as "brilliant". From there, Jones received bit parts in television shows like Louie and House of Cards. He was cast in Oz the Great and Powerful (2013) because director Sam Raimi liked his voice. That same year, he received a lead role as a cult leader named Father in The Sacrament (2013). Jones got the part after director Ti West saw his role as a pharmacist in Louie and asked him to send in a video audition.

== Filmography ==
=== Film ===
| Year | Title | Role | Notes. |
|---|---|---|---|
| 2007 | No Country for Old Men | Gas Station Proprietor | |
| 2012 | The Odd Life of Timothy Green | Neighbor | |
| 2013 | Oz the Great and Powerful | Wild West Barker | |
| 2013 | The Sacrament | Charles Anderson Reed "Father" | |
| 2014 | A Merry Friggin' Christmas | Glen | |
| 2015 | The Hateful Eight | Sweet Dave | |
| 2016 | Katie Says Goodbye | Mr. Willard | |
| 2017 | The Strange Ones | Gary | |
| 2018 | The Old Man & the Gun | Mr. Owens | |
| 2018 | The Standoff at Sparrow Creek | Hubbel | |
| 2023 | Killers of the Flower Moon | Pitts Beatty | |
| 2023 | The Last Stop in Yuma County | Robert | |
| 2024 | Fly Me to the Moon | Senator Hopp | |

=== Television ===
| Year | Title | Role | Notes. |
|---|---|---|---|
| 1990 | The Civil War | Various | 9 episodes |
| 2004 | Chappelle's Show | Prosecutor #3 | 1 episode |
| 2012 | Louie | Pharmacist | Episode: "Ikea/Piano Lesson" |
| 2013 | House of Cards | Wayne Paley | 1 episode |
| 2013 | Boardwalk Empire | Indiana Counter Man | 1 episode |
| 2015–2016 | Inside Amy Schumer | Congressman #3 / Doctor | 2 episodes |
| 2016 | Vinyl | Colonel Tom Parker | Episode: "The King and I" |
| 2017 | Godless | Sheriff Elton Cunningham | Miniseries |
| 2019 | Living with Yourself | Farmer Ray | 3 episodes |
| 2020 | Little America | Hat Store Shopkeep | Episode: "The Cowboy" |
| 2023 | The Blacklist | Pops | Episode: "The Four Guns" |

=== Video games ===
| Year | Title | Role | Notes. |
|---|---|---|---|
| 2004 | Red Dead Revolver | Sheriff Bartlett / Cowboy (voices) | |
| 2018 | Red Dead Redemption 2 | Roscoe Brenner / The Local Pedestrian Population (voice) | |
| 2019 | Red Dead Online | Roscoe Brenner (voice) | |
