= Independent Spirit Award for Best Male Performance in a New Scripted Series =

Acting award

- Presented by: Film Independent
- First award: Amit Rahav; Unorthodox (2020)
- Final award: Lee Jung-jae; Squid Game (2021)
- Website: filmindependent.org

The Independent Spirit Award for Best Male Performance in a New Scripted Series was one of the annual Independent Spirit Awards to honor an actor who has delivered an outstanding performance in a new scripted series. It was first presented in 2020 with Amit Rahav being the first recipient of the award for his role as Yakov "Yanky" Shapiro in miniseries Unorthodox and the last recipient of the award is Lee Jung-jae for his role as Seong Gi-hun in Squid Game.

In 2022, it was announced that the acting categories would be retired and replaced with two gender neutral categories: Best Lead Performance in a New Scripted Series & Best Supporting Performance in a New Scripted Series.

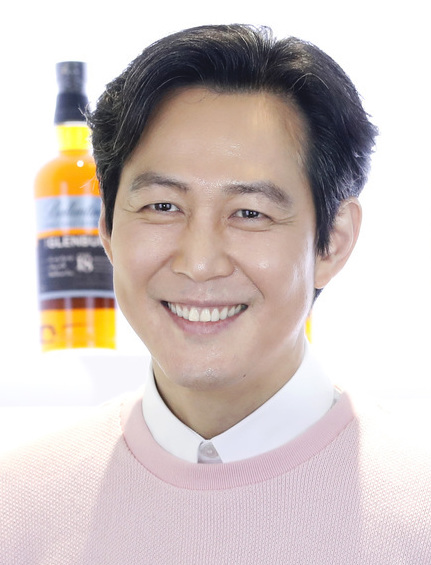
Lee Jung-jae was the final recipient for Squid Game.

== Winners and nominees ==
=== 2020s ===
Year	Nominees	Show	Role	Network
2020	Amit Rahav	Unorthodox	Yakov "Yanky" Shapiro	Netflix
2020	Adam Ali	Little America	Zain	Apple TV+
2020	Nicco Annan	P-Valley	Uncle Clifford	Starz
2020	Conphidance	Little America	Iwegbuna	Apple TV+
2020	Harold Torres	ZeroZeroZero	Manuel Contreras	Prime Video
2021	Lee Jung-jae	Squid Game	Seong Gi-hun	Netflix
2021	Olly Alexander	It's a Sin	Ritchie Tozer	Channel 4
2021	Murray Bartlett	The White Lotus	Armond	HBO
2021	Michael Greyeyes	Rutherford Falls	Terry Thomas	Peacock
2021	Ashley Thomas	Them: Covenant	Henry Emory	Prime Video
