= Aron Gaudet =

American film director

- Born: Old Town, Maine, U.S.
- Citizenship: American
- Education: New England School of Communications
- Occupations: Screenwriter; Film producer; Film and TV director; Television journalist; Journalist; Film editor; Author
- Years active: 2007–present
- Organization(s): Team A + G Productions, Inc.
- Notable work: Crook County; Beneath the Harvest Sky; The Way We Get By; Queenpins; Little America; Tulsa King; Inspiration To Get You Through A F*cked Up Year
- Title: Filmmaker
- Spouse: Gita Pullapilly
- Relatives: Cyriac Pullapilly (father-in-law)
- Awards: Variety Magazine's 2014 "10 Directors To Watch" (with Pullapilly); Guggenheim Fellow (with Pullapilly); Independent Magazine's "Filmmakers to Watch"; WGBH Filmmaker-in-Residence; 2015 Black List Screenwriter (with Gita Pullapilly)

Aron Gaudet is an American film director, producer, screenwriter, and author. He is best known for The Way We Get By (2009), Beneath the Harvest Sky (2013), and Queenpins (2021). He writes and directs with his wife and film partner, Gita Pullapilly, under their banner, "Team A + G Productions, Inc."

== Biography ==
Gaudet was born and raised in Old Town, Maine. He was educated at the University of Maine and the New England School of Communications. Prior to working in the film industry, he worked in television news in Bangor, Maine, Burlington, Vermont, Grand Rapids, Michigan, and Boston, Massachusetts. In Boston, he worked for New England Sports Network (NESN) covering the Red Sox and the Bruins. He is a member of the Writers Guild of America and the Directors Guild of America.

Gaudet began his film career in 2007 co-directing an episode titled India: A New Life for the documentary series Frontline/World which aired on June 21, 2007, that year he was selected as a WGBH Filmmaker in Residence for The Way We Get By. In 2009, Gaudet released The Way We Get By, about three senior citizens in Maine who greet American troops returning from Iraq and Afghanistan at the Bangor Airport. His mother, Joan Gaudet, is featured in the film. The Way We Get By world premiered at the SXSW film festival, aired on national PBS' POV, played theatrically in 60 US cities and played in over 100 film festivals around the world.

The film was nominated for a national Emmy and was screened at the White House. It has received multiple festival honors, including the Special Jury Award at SXSW, the Standing Up Film Competition at the Cleveland International Film Festival, and the Audience Award at the Full Frame Documentary Film Festival. It was also named Best Documentary at several international film festivals and won AARP's Movies for Grownups Award for Best Documentary of 2009. In addition, the film earned a 2010 News & Documentary Emmy Award nomination and a Cinema Eye Honors nomination for Outstanding Achievement in a Debut Feature Film.

In 2012, Gaudet co-created and co-executive produced the national U.S. PBS program Lifecasters, which world premiered at the Film Society of Lincoln Center. He also directed The Gambling Man, a 20-minute documentary short film follows an 80-year-old retired radiologist Albert "Alby" Hurwit, who successfully composes an Grammy award-winning symphony using computer software despite having no formal musical training and being unable to read or write music. Hurwit, was featured as a subject in the 60-minute PBS production "Lifecasters," which premiered at Lincoln Center in New York City in February 2013.

In 2015, Gaudet was awarded the Guggenheim fellowship for his work as a filmmaker and in 2014, he was selected as one of Variety's "10 Directors To Watch" for his narrative feature directorial debut, Beneath the Harvest Sky. During that time, he co-wrote a screenplay for Crook County, a true story of the 1980s FBI investigation in Chicago called Operation Greylord; the screenplay was selected for the 2015 Black List of top unproduced screenplays.

In 2018, Gaudet was selected for the Ryan Murphy Half Initiative for Directing for Television. He shadow directed on the season finale episode of ‘American Horror Story.’

In 2019, Gaudet and Gita Pullapilly created the India-US Film Initiative, a program designed to champion and foster Indian filmmakers in Hollywood and US filmmakers in Bollywood. Gaudet co-wrote the screenplay, Queenpins, with Gita Pullapilly, which they co-directed in 2020. Queenpins is a dark comedy starring Kristen Bell and Vince Vaughn, inspired by the true story of the largest counterfeit coupon caper in history. STX sold the domestic rights to Queenpins for a record $21.5 million. It was previously streamed on PLUTO, owned by Paramount Global, and was in the Netflix Global Top 10 for weeks. It is currently streaming on Amazon.

In 2023, Gaudet and Pullapilly directed episode 7, “Paper Piano,” of the second season of the American anthology television series Little America for Apple TV+, and in 2025, they directed two episodes of Season 4 of Tulsa King starring Sylvester Stallone for 101 Studios and Paramount+. Gaudet and Pullapilly are attached to direct a $35 million dramatic thriller, "David Armstrong," with 101 Studios' David Glasser producing and starring Jeremy Renner and Billy Bob Thornton.

Gaudet is one of the writers and directors of the 2026 upcoming action-revenge thriller, Wild World, starring Isabel May.

Gaudet is a notable speaker on the film industry and has spoken at numerous events, including Film Independent, the Gotham Film & Media Institute, the Toronto International Film Festival, SXSW, DeBartolo Performing Arts Center, and Tribeca. Gaudet has been interviewed by major news outlets including the New York Times, Boston Globe, Washington Post, Chicago Tribune, Wall Street Journal, CNN, NBC, The Hollywood Reporter, ABC, Variety, CBS, and Forbes.

== Filmography ==
=== Film ===
Year	Title	Notes
2009	The Way We Get By	documentary film; Cinema Eye Honors Award and Emmy Award nominee
2010	The Elephant Bath	Documentary short
2012	The Gambling Man	Documentary short
2013	Lifecasters	documentary TV film
2013	Beneath the Harvest Sky	feature film
2021	Queenpins	feature film

=== Television ===
Year	Title	Notes
2023	Little America	season 2, episode 7, 'Paper Piano'
2026	Tulsa King	Season 4, 2 episodes

== Personal life ==
Gaudet is married to Gita Pullapilly, the American screenwriter, film director, producer and author. They write and direct under the banner, Team A + G Productions, Inc. In 2022, they published their first book together, Inspiration To Get You Through A F*cked Up Year.
