= Bull (2019 film) =

2019 film

- Film poster
- Directed by: Annie Silverstein
- Written by: Annie Silverstein; Johnny McAllister
- Produced by: Monique Walton; Bert Marcus; Heather Rae; Ryan Zacarias; Audrey Rosenberg
- Starring: Rob Morgan; Amber Havard; Yolonda Ross
- Cinematography: Shabier Kirchner
- Edited by: Miguel Schverdfinger; Todd Holmes
- Music by: William Ryan Fritch
- Production companies: Bert Marcus Film; Invisible Pictures
- Distributed by: Samuel Goldwyn Films
- Release dates: May 15, 2019 (Cannes); May 1, 2020 (United States)
- Running time: 101 minutes
- Country: United States
- Language: English

Bull is a 2019 American drama film directed by Annie Silverstein. It premiered in the Un Certain Regard section at the 2019 Cannes Film Festival. The film received widespread critical acclaim and went on to screen at the Deauville Film Festival, where it won three of the top five prizes including the Grand Jury Prize, Revelations Prize for Best First Film, and the Critics Award. Bull was released to video on demand and streaming platforms on May 1, 2020.

== Plot ==
In Houston, Texas, Kris is a 14-year-old girl who lives with her grandmother and younger sister while her mother Janis is incarcerated. One night, Kris breaks into the home of Abe, a man who lives down the street from her, in an attempt to steal his alcohol and painkillers for her and her friends. She is caught by Abe, but in lieu of her serving time in a juvenile hall, Abe agrees to let Kris make amends by helping him clean his house and repair his chicken coop. Unbeknownst to Kris, Abe is a former bull rider whose accumulated injuries caused him to leave the sport. Abe manages to scrape a living as a trainer for the next generation of riders. He and Kris gradually form a tentative friendship as she is exposed to the world of bull riding. Though Kris finds a new passion for the sport, bad influences threaten to lure her back to her delinquent ways. Abe also struggles with the realities of getting older and aging out of the rodeo star life.

== Cast ==
- Rob Morgan as Abe Turner
- Amber Havard as Kris
- Yolonda Ross as Sheila
- Keira Bennett as Chance
- Keeli Wheeler as Marjorie
- Sara Allbright as Janis
- Troy Anthony Hogan as Mike
- Steven Boyd as Billy
- Roishaun Davenport as Roishaun

== Release ==
The film had its world premiere on May 15, 2019 at the Cannes Film Festival in the Un Certain Regard section. The Hollywood Reporter named Bull one of the best films screened at the festival. In October, the film's North American rights were acquired by Samuel Goldwyn Films. Sony Pictures Worldwide Acquisitions acquired international distribution rights.

The film had its American premiere on October 18, 2019 at Film Independent's New Wave showcase. On May 1, 2020, the film was released digitally.

== Reception ==
Bull received positive from critics. On review aggregator website Rotten Tomatoes, 90% of 89 reviews are positive, with an average rating of 7.3/10. The website's critics consensus reads: "An intimate two-hander anchored by a pair of well-matched actors, Bull takes an achingly empathetic look at life on the economic margins." At Metacritic, the film has a weighted average score of 65 out of 100, based on 18 critics, indicating "generally favorable" reviews.

Critics praised the film for the acting of its two leads, Silverstein's focus on an unfamiliar world, and its slice-of-life approach. Eric Kohn of IndieWire wrote the film is "an evocative coming-of-age story...carried by a pair of astounding performances that hover on a plane of their own, generating unique chemistry that finds its emotional center with time." Nell Minow of RogerEbert.com awarded the film 3.5 out of 4 stars and said the film is "quietly observed, beautifully performed", while Alan Ng of Film Threat opined the film is "a subtle tale about the bonds of friendship in times of hopelessness." The New York Times's Jeanette Catsoulis said the film "handles hot-button issues with a cool eye and a calming tone."

Sight & Sound gave the film a five star review and opined Bull "is a mesmerising film, and one that will linger in the imagination long after the sounds of the crickets have faded." The Playlist stated, "the result is a sensitive, if occasionally orthodox, treatment of a compassionate friendship enacted in the face of societal apathy", and "it's a hardscrabble tale of one singular bond amidst a landscape of socio-economic struggle."

Much acclaim was given to the performance of Rob Morgan. In Pajiba, Roxana Hadadi wrote, "As the lead in Annie Silverstein's Bull, Morgan reiterates what he's capable of, delivering a captivating performance of a man aging out of his dream and realizing, not for the first or the last time, that maybe his passion isn't enough." David Fear of Rolling Stone gave the film 4 out of 5 stars and said Morgan gives one of the great screen performances of the year.

Hadadi added that while the plot line can seem like a familiar "troubled white person saved by the influence of a POC" narrative, Bull is able to sidestep the cliches "because of how much time it spends with Morgan's Abe, and how much time it spends in the ring. Like The Wrestler or The Rider or even Lean on Pete, Bull is interested in the toll a sport takes on your body, on the ways we build up our tolerance for that pain, and on the limits of how much we can take."

Loren King of the Alliance of Women Film Journalists stated the film is a "powerful, poetic debut feature" and that the film "portrays marginal lives with unflinching honesty and heart-wrenching humanity." Slash Film also noted Silverstein has a "keen eye for detail and terrific rapport with her performers, many of them untrained. The film easily could have descended into mawkishness, but instead the travails of Kris and Abe feel entirely real, and thus all the more moving. Silverstein takes Bull by the horns and drags us into this world, making us feel a part of these characters, witnessing their strengths and weakness as they come to grips with the challenges of life in their Texas town."

Though the film was heavily compared to the film The Rider, critics said Bull is "far from being a carbon copy, [and] is another multifaceted cinematic examination of characters that are often pushed to the peripheries or treated with pity. It's a fantastic narrative feature debut for Silverstein, and more than worthy of Un Certain Regard." Chuck Koplinski of the Illinois Times gave the film 4/4 stars.

== Accolades ==
Award	Category	Nominee	Result	Ref.
Black Reel Awards	Outstanding Actor	Rob Morgan	Nominated	
Cannes Film Festival	Golden Camera	Annie Silverstein	Nominated	
Cannes Film Festival	Un Certain Regard Award	Annie Silverstein	Nominated	
Deauville Film Festival	Critics Award	Annie Silverstein	Won	
Deauville Film Festival	Grand Special Prize	Annie Silverstein	Won	
Deauville Film Festival	Revelations Prize	Annie Silverstein	Won	
Houston Film Critics Society Awards	Texas Independent Film Award		Won	
Independent Spirit Awards	Best Male Lead	Rob Morgan	Nominated	
Independent Spirit Awards	Best Cinematography	Shabier Kirchner	Nominated	
Independent Spirit Awards	Someone to Watch Award	Annie Silverstein	Nominated	
SXSW Film Festival	Louis Black "Lone Star" Award; Special Jury Recognition for Acting	Rob Morgan	Won	
