= Beneath the Harvest Sky =

- Film poster
- Directed by: Aron Gaudet; Gita Pullapilly
- Written by: Aron Gaudet; Gita Pullapilly
- Produced by: Aron Gaudet; Gita Pullapilly; Kavita Pullapilly
- Starring: W. Earl Brown; Joe Cobden; Emory Cohen; David Denman; Carlo Gallo; Aidan Gillen; Zoe Levin; Callan McAuliffe; Michael McGrady; Josh Mostel; Carrie Preston; Timm Sharp; Tim Simons; Sarah Sutherland; Delaney Williams
- Cinematography: Steven Capitano Calitri
- Edited by: Aron Gaudet
- Music by: Dustin Hamman
- Distributed by: Tribeca Films
- Release date: September 8, 2013 (TIFF)
- Running time: 116 minutes
- Country: United States
- Language: English
- Box office: $34,768

Beneath the Harvest Sky (previously known as Blue Potato) is a 2013 indie American drama film directed by Aron Gaudet and Gita Pullapilly. The film stars Emory Cohen, Callan McAuliffe, Sarah Sutherland, Timothy Simons, W. Earl Brown and Aidan Gillen. Beneath the Harvest Sky is about two teenage best friends in rural Maine caught up in the illegal prescription drug trade between Canada and Maine. It is a story about friendship, family and love. The film highlights social issues in rural communities and the lack of opportunities and resources for youth.

The film premiered at the 2013 Toronto International Film Festival on September 8 and had its U.S. premiere at the Tribeca Film Festival. It played theatrically before its release on the digital platforms. The film partnered with "Terra Chips" to promote and market the movie.

== Plot ==
Dominic Roy is a 17-year-old headstrong and hardworking teen who works in the local potato harvest farm to earn money to escape the struggling Maine hometown hopefully for a better future. Dominic's best friend Casper, a reckless teenager who has always dreamed with Dominic about leaving Van Buren, Maine and moving to Boston. But they need to earn enough money in order to do that. Dominic and Casper both have their own ways of earning the money. While Dominic works hard on the farm to earn his money, Casper on the other hand works with his outlaw father Clayton to smuggle drugs across the border of Canada. This challenges the two best friends' friendship and loyalty towards each other.

== Cast ==
- Emory Cohen as Casper
- Callan McAuliffe as Dominic Roy
- Aidan Gillen as Clayton
- Timm Sharp as Badger
- Sarah Sutherland as Emma
- Zoe Levin as Tasha
- W. Earl Brown as Roger
- David Denman as George
- Carrie Preston as Kim
- Carlo Gallo as Renee
- Delaney Williams as James
- Josh Mostel as Principal
- Timothy Simons as Dayton
- Joe Cobden as Mr. Soucy
- Erik Moody as Jesse
- Kevin Corsaro as CBP officer two.
- Gerard Richard as young boy
