= Adam Ali =

Adam Ali may refer to:

- Adam Ali (racing driver)
- Adam Ali (actor)
