= Mfoniso Udofia =

American storyteller

- Citizenship: Nigeria, United States
- Occupations: Actor, Writer, Educator

Mfoniso Udofia is a Nigerian-American storyteller, actor, and educator whose work centers on Nigerian immigrant life within the United States. Celebrated and well known work from Udofia includes: Sojourners, Her Portmanteau, runboyrun and In Old Age --- all plays from within her projected nine-play Ufot Cycle. She also works in film/television as a writer-producer on shows like Little America, Pachinko, A League of Their Own and Showtime's, Let the Right One In.

== Early life and education ==
In the 1970s, Udofia's parents immigrated from Nigeria to Houston, Texas, finally settling in Worcester, MA. Udofia went on to complete her undergraduate degree in political science from Wellesley College.

Udofia then went on to continue her education at the American Conservatory Theater. After graduating with her M.F.A in Acting Udofia moved to New York for work as an actress. Post-graduation, Udofia began writing plays that centered the Nigerian immigrant experience in America. She also briefly mentored rapper Marcus Orelias, while he attended the American Conservatory Theatre.

== Work ==
Upon completion of her Masters at the American Conservatory Theater, Udofia moved to New York City and began writing plays. The first play she wrote was The Grove, a play which would go on to become the second installation in a nine-play cycle entitled, The Ufot Cycle. The Ufot Cycle follows a Nigerian immigrant family across generations navigating their lives and identities in America. Her plays have had readings and/or productions at: New York Theatre Workshop, American Conservatory Theater, Magic Theater, The Playwrights Realm, Boston Court, Denver Center, Portland Center Stage, Berkeley Rep, The National Black Theater, Manhattan Theatre Club, MCC and McCarter Theatre. Her work has been developed at: Hedgebrook, Sundance Theatre Lab, Space on Ryder Farm, New Black Fest and more.

Outside of the cycle she has written a modern translation of Othello for the PlayOn! Festival and compiled a night of her shorts, entitled On Love for MCC. She's also written plays for both radio and the internet with her plays, The Human Experiment [radio], and New Math [Instagram].

In 2018 she began writing for television, starting as a staff writer for the 3rd season of Netflix's, 13 Reasons Why. She has gone on to write for over eight television shows.

== Ufot Cycle Plays ==
As of October 2025, seven of the nine play series comprising Ufot Cycle Plays have been produced and/or staged:

=== #1. Sojourners ===
- October 31 – December 1, 2024 at The Huntington Theatre, Boston

=== #2. The Grove ===
- February 7 – March 9, 2025 at The Calderwood Pavilion Wimberly Theatre, Boston

=== #3. runboyrun ===
- March 13, 2025 at Boston Public Library GBH Studio, Boston
- March 14, 2025 at The Huntington Theatre, Boston

=== #4. Her Portmanteau ===
- March 27 – April 20, 2025 at Central Square Theater, Cambridge MA

=== #5. Kufre n’ Quay ===
- Jul 10th – Jul 26th, 2025 at Boston Arts Academy Main Stage Theatre, Boston

=== #6. The Ceremony ===
- September 11 – October 5, 2025 at Joan & Edgar Booth Theatre, Brookline MA

=== #7. Lifted ===
- March 10 – March 14, 2026 at Footlight Club, Jamaica Plain MA (presented by Wellesley Repertory Theatre)
- March 24 – March 28, 2026 at The Huntington Theatre Maso Studio, Boston (presented by Wellesley Repertory Theatre)
- March 29, 2026 at Walsh Alumnae Hall Auditorium, Wellesley College, Wellesley MA (presented by Wellesley Repertory Theatre)

=== #8. In Old Age ===
- June 13 – June 28, 2026 at Emerson Paramount Center Liebergott Black Box Theatre, Boston

=== Forthcoming premieres are ===
- 9. Adiaha and Clora Snatch Joy, to open November 24, 2026 at The Huntington Theatre

== Awards/Honors ==
Year	Award	Category	Work	Results	Ref.
2024	Steinberg Playwright Award				
2021	Horton Foote Award			Won	
2018	Edgerton New Play Award		In Old Age	Won	
2017	Helen Merrill Award for Playwriting			Won	
2017-2018	PWC McKnight National Residency and Commission				
2016-2025	New Dramatists				
2016	Edgerton New Play Award		Her Portmanteau	Won	
2015	Edgerton New Play Award		runboyrun	Won	
2015	Edgerton New Play Award		Sojourners	Won	
2015	2nd Annual Kilroy list		Sojourners	Won	
