= Residue (film) =

2020 American film

- Directed by: Merawi Gerima
- Screenplay by: Merawi Gerima
- Produced by: Merawi Gerima
- Cinematography: Mark Jeevaratnam
- Edited by: Merawi Gerima
- Release date: 2020
- Country: United States
- Language: English

Residue is a 2020 American drama film written, directed and produced by Merawi Gerima, at his feature film debut.

The film premiered at the 77th edition of the Venice Film Festival, in the Giornate degli Autori sidebar. Gerima was awarded the John Cassavetes Award at the 36th Independent Spirit Awards.

== Cast ==
- Obinna Nwachukwu as Jay
- Dennis Lindsey as Delonte
- Taline Stewart as Blue
- Derron Scott as Mike

== Reception ==
On the review aggregator website Rotten Tomatoes, 94% of 33 critics' reviews are positive, with an average rating of 7.80/10.
