= Honk for Jesus. Save Your Soul. =

2022 American comedy film

- Release poster
- Directed by: Adamma Ebo
- Written by: Adamma Ebo
- Based on: Honk for Jesus. Save Your Soul. by Adamma Ebo
- Produced by: Rowan Riley; Daniel Kaluuya; Amandla Crichlow; Matthew Cooper; Jessamine Burgum; Adanne Ebo; Regina Hall; Sterling K. Brown; Kara Durrett
- Starring: Regina Hall; Sterling K. Brown; Conphidance; Austin Crute; Nicole Beharie
- Cinematography: Alan Gwizdowski
- Edited by: Ali Greer; Stacy Moon
- Music by: Marcus Norris
- Production companies: Monkeypaw Productions; Pinky Promise; 59% Productions; Ejime Productions; Rh Negative; Indian Meadows Productions
- Distributed by: Focus Features
- Release dates: January 23, 2022 (Sundance); September 2, 2022 (United States)
- Running time: 102 minutes
- Country: United States
- Language: English
- Box office: $2.6 million

Honk for Jesus. Save Your Soul. is a 2022 American mockumentary comedy film written, directed, and produced by Adamma Ebo, in her feature directorial debut, and is a feature-length adaptation of Ebo's 2018 short film of the same name. It stars Regina Hall and Sterling K. Brown as the first lady and the pastor of a megachurch, who attempt to reopen and rebuild their congregation, following a major scandal. Austin Crute, Nicole Beharie, and Conphidance also feature in supporting roles. Hall and Brown are also producers on the film alongside Daniel Kaluuya, who produced under his 59% Productions banner, with Jordan Peele credited as executive producer under his Monkeypaw Productions banner.

The film had its world premiere at the Sundance Film Festival on January 23, 2022, and was released theatrically and streaming on Peacock on September 2, 2022, by Focus Features. It received generally positive reviews from critics.

== Plot ==
Pastor Lee-Curtis Childs and his wife, First Lady Trinitie Childs, ran the Southern Baptist megachurch, Wander to Greater Paths, with a large following, and raked in a substantial amount of money. However, a recent scandal involving Lee-Curtis seducing vulnerable young men, despite his previous preaching against same-sex relationships, forced the Childses to close their church after severe backlash and a mass exodus of congregants. One year later, they hire a documentary crew to document their comeback and reopening of their church on Easter Sunday. While Lee-Curtis and Trinitie try to show that they are decent people, the documentary crew captures them indulging in expenses, including their wardrobe full of designer brands and a fountain in the church.

A pastoral couple, Keon and Shakura Sumpter, are planning to open their own church, Heaven's Home, on Easter Sunday as well. They cite the Childses as their inspiration but have also gathered many of their former congregants to attend their sermons. The Childses' "devout five" congregants believe Lee-Curtis is not guilty of the allegations and are more than happy to abide by his words, attending their Wednesday sermon despite a mishap during their baptism.

During a shopping spree, Trinitie runs into a former congregant who makes subtly condescending remarks and lets Trinitie know she will be joining Heaven's Home on Easter along with other former congregants. Later, the couple is informed by their lawyer that they have to make settlements to the young men, although one of them won't accept a settlement. The next day, Lee-Curtis attempts to give Basil, the documentary's sound recorder, an opportunity to do audio-visual work for their church, while also making a sexual advance towards him. However, Basil states that he currently has a boyfriend.

The Childses visit the Sumpters in an attempt to get them to move their opening date away from Easter. While they try to be friendly with one another, the Sumpters are adamant about sticking to that date. Lee-Curtis then plans to reopen Greater Paths within the next few days, two weeks before Easter, in order to beat the Sumpters. Lee-Curtis has Trinitie wave a sign in the street to advertise their return, telling her to "shake it for the Lord" to get more people in cars to honk and acknowledge them. While standing outside, Trinitie is harassed by a woman who criticizes her and her husband for their actions. Meanwhile, Lee-Curtis has a reunion with a young former congregant, revealed by the documentary to have been in a penitentiary.

Lee-Curtis has Trinitie paint her face with white mime make-up so she can do "worship miming" to attract more honks on the street. A car stops in the middle of the street and causes a traffic jam. The car's passenger is revealed to be Khalil, the victim who won't accept the settlement. He initially seems distraught but soon breaks character by bursting into laughter, mocking Lee-Curtis for his attempts to overcome the scandal. Trinitie storms back to the church and confesses her grievances over her marriage and how their congregants have all turned on them because of the scandal. The documentary director, Anita Bonet, asks Trinitie why she won't leave Lee-Curtis. Trinitie rejects her question and dismisses Anita's true goal for the documentary to "understand" her, Lee-Curtis, and the town's church culture.

The church reopens per the revised plan, two weeks before Easter, where Lee-Curtis and Trinitie stand outside waiting for people to show up with no luck except the "devout five". A Mustang drives up to the front only to whirl around in the lot. It is revealed that the Sumpters had also moved up the opening of their Heaven's Home church to two weeks before Easter, their intention to give Easter opening to the Childses, earning great success and gaining many congregants.

== Cast ==
- Regina Hall as Trinitie Childs
- Sterling K. Brown as Lee-Curtis Childs
- Nicole Beharie as Shakura Sumpter
- Conphidance as Keon Sumpter
- Austin Crute as Khalil
- Devere Rogers as Basil
- Avis Marie Barnes as Sabina
- Robert Yatta as Deacon Alastor Culpepper
- Greta Marable Glenn as Deaconess Culpepper
- Selah Kimbro Jones as Aria Devaughn
- Crystal Alicia Garrett as Sapphire Devaughn
- Perris Drew as Kensington Straterly
- Natasha L. Fuller as Vera Joseph
- Andrea Laing as Anita
- Mike Dyl Anthony as Monterius West
- Olivia D. Dawson as Sister Denetta
- Jerome Beazer as Verlenzo Hawk

== Production ==
In May 2021, it was announced Regina Hall and Sterling K. Brown would star in the film, with Adamma Ebo directing from a screenplay she wrote, and Daniel Kaluuya set to serve as a producer under his 59% Productions banner. In June 2021, Nicole Beharie, Conphidance, Austin Crute and Devere Rogers joined the cast of the film.

Principal photography concluded in July 2021.

== Release ==
The film had its world premiere at the 2022 Sundance Film Festival on January 23, 2022. In February 2022, Focus Features, Peacock and Monkeypaw Productions acquired distribution rights to the film for $8.5 million, with Monkeypaw principal Jordan Peele receiving residual credit as an executive producer. It was released theatrically and on Peacock on September 2, 2022.

== Reception ==
=== Box office ===
The film was released alongside Gigi & Nate, and made $1.4 million from 1,882 theaters in its three-day opening weekend, and a total of $1.75 million over the four-day Labor Day frame. 62% of the audience was female, 61% was over the age of 35, and 50% was African-American.

=== Critical response ===
On Rotten Tomatoes, the film holds an approval rating of 71% based on 174 reviews, with an average rating of 6.3/10. The site's critical consensus reads, "Honk for Jesus. Save Your Soul. has some broad targets but refuses to take cheap shots at them, instead offering a pointed, well-acted satire of organized religion." Metacritic assigned the film a weighted average score of 63 out of 100, based on 35 critics, indicating "generally favorable" reviews. Audiences polled by CinemaScore gave the film an average grade of "C–" on an A+ to F scale, while those at PostTrak gave the film a 45% overall positive score, with 28% saying they would definitely recommend it.
