= Queenpins =

2021 comedy film

- Theatrical release poster
- Directed by: Aron Gaudet; Gita Pullapilly
- Written by: Aron Gaudet; Gita Pullapilly
- Produced by: Linda McDonough; Nicholas Weinstock; Ben Stiller
- Starring: Kristen Bell; Kirby Howell-Baptiste; Paul Walter Hauser; Bebe Rexha; Vince Vaughn
- Cinematography: Andrew Wehde
- Edited by: Kayla Emter
- Music by: Siddhartha Khosla
- Production companies: AGC Studios; Marquee Entertainment; Red Hour Productions
- Distributed by: STXfilms; Paramount+ (through Showtime)
- Release date: September 10, 2021 (United States)
- Running time: 110 minutes
- Country: United States
- Language: English
- Budget: $6.7 million
- Box office: $1.2 million

Queenpins is a 2021 American comedy film written and directed by Aron Gaudet and Gita Pullapilly. It stars Kristen Bell, Kirby Howell-Baptiste, Paul Walter Hauser, Bebe Rexha, and Vince Vaughn. Ben Stiller serves as an executive producer under his Red Hour Productions banner.

Queenpins was released in a limited theatrical release via Cinemark in the United States on September 10, 2021, by STXfilms and in the United States on Paramount+ on September 30, 2021. The film received mixed reviews from critics.

The film is based on the story of Robin Ramirez, Amiko (Amy) Fountain, and Marilyn Johnson who were arrested by the Phoenix Police in 2012. The police found more than $25 million of fake coupons in Ramirez's house and seized more than $2 million worth of assets including 22 firearms, 21 vehicles, and a 40-foot boat.

== Plot ==
Suburban housewife Connie Kaminski, a three-time gold medal-winning former Olympic racewalker, has been overlooked by her husband Rick, an IRS senior audit specialist, and the rest of society. Alienated by her uninspiring existence being unemployed and having suffered a miscarriage after a few attempts to conceive a child via in vitro fertilization, Connie commiserates with her best friend Joanna "JoJo" Johnson, who has been unable to secure proper employment since having her identity stolen and thus lives with her mother Josephine. JoJo attempts to generate revenue by making YouTube videos while being amorously pursued by the local mailman, Earl.

After a frustrating day, Connie writes a complaint letter to General Mills about the Wheaties she ate being stale. Soon, she receives a coupon for a free box of cereal. Greg Garcia, a cashier at her local A&G Family Marts store, explains that companies habitually respond to complaint letters by sending coupons for free items.

Connie and JoJo then learn that the coupons originate from an Advanced Solutions factory in Chihuahua, Mexico. They travel there and enlist married employees Alejandro and Rosa Diaz, who agree to send them the unused coupons.

Afterward, the duo began their own website and small business "Savvy Super Saver," where they sell coupons and generate profit. However, Ken Miller, a loss prevention officer for the A&G Family Marts stores in the Southwestern United States, learns about the coupons and the losses several companies are taking. Unsuccessful at pressuring his superiors to act, he decides to handle the case himself.

The duo's account is frozen due to suspicious activity, so Connie realizes that they need to prove their business is legitimate. They contact the hacker who stole JoJo's identity, Tempe Tina, and she instructs them to secure their money, suggesting that they use JoJo's cosmetics brand Back 2 Black to disguise their operation.

After six months, they figure their money is safe to use but decide they should spend and clean it as a backup plan. Tina then contacts them and criticizes their overspending, explaining their money was already clean, so their purchases are causing suspicions; she instructs them to deposit money back into the bank in small increments and to sell their big purchases.

Meanwhile, Ken is partnered with U.S. postal inspector Simon Kilmurry. They interview people from grocery stores that the ladies frequent, almost all of whom recognize Connie due to her irritating coupon usage. The duo then interviews a group of postal workers, who remember JoJo, especially because Earl is always watching her videos.

Simon and Ken get federal agents to arrest the pair. Earl bails JoJo out of jail, but Rick visits Connie solely to admonish her. Weary of his lack of support, she declares that she wants a divorce.

Despite the pair facing forty years to life, the companies that they victimized clandestinely press the courts for leniency to avoid bad press. This results in ten days suspended imprisonment plus one year of probation for JoJo and eleven months incarceration (parole eligible in eight months) for Connie.

Even though most of their fraudulent earnings have been confiscated, the pair have hundreds of thousands of dollars stashed away. JoJo starts a relationship with Earl and relocates to Montenegro, where the pair can restart the scam upon Connie's release since the country does not extradite suspects. It is also revealed that Connie has finally become pregnant.

== Cast ==
- Kristen Bell as Connie Kaminski
- Kirby Howell-Baptiste as Joanna "JoJo" Johnson
- Paul Walter Hauser as Ken Miller
- Vince Vaughn as Simon Kilmurry
- Joel McHale as Rick Kaminski
- Bebe Rexha as Tempe Tina
- Dayo Okeniyi as Earl
- Greta Oglesby as Josephine "Mama Josie" Johnson, JoJo's mother
- Jack McBrayer as Agent Park
- Michael Masini as Agent Harris
- Annie Mumolo as Crystal
- Stephen Root as Agent Flanagan
- Paul Rust as Albert Anderson
- Timm Sharp as the gun dealer
- Eduardo Franco as Greg Garcia, the cashier

In addition, the scenes involving the gun sale include short appearances by co-director and co-writer Aron Gaudet's brother Nick as a barista, as well as Nick Cassavetes as Captain Pain, the leader of the group buying the guns.

== Production ==
In May 2019, it was announced Kristen Bell and Leslie Jones had joined the cast of the film, with Aron Gaudet and Gita Pullapilly directing from a screenplay they wrote. In July 2020, it was announced Paul Walter Hauser and Vince Vaughn had joined the cast of the film. In September 2020, Kirby Howell-Baptiste joined the cast of the film, replacing Jones, with Ben Stiller joining as an executive producer under his Red Hour Productions banner, with STX Entertainment set to distribute. In October 2020, Bebe Rexha joined the cast of the film. In December 2020, Dayo Okeniyi, Joel McHale, Nick Cassavetes, Michael Masini, Paul Rust, Eduardo Franco, Marc Evan Jackson, Lidia Porto, Greta Oglesby, Jack McBrayer and Annie Mumolo joined the cast of the film.

Principal photography began in October 2020, during the COVID-19 pandemic.

== Release ==
In June 2021, Showtime and Paramount+ acquired U.S. pay TV and streaming rights to the film for about $20 million. It was released on September 10, 2021.

== Reception ==
=== Box office ===
Other box office grosses include Russia ($326,012), Ukraine ($221,109), Netherlands ($200,244), United Arab Emirates ($123,281), Hungary ($88,609), Croatia ($41,810), Lithuania ($18,354), Iceland ($11,774), South Africa ($5,900) and Portugal ($5,501).

=== Critical reception ===
On the review aggregator website Rotten Tomatoes, the film holds an approval rating of 47% based on 62 reviews with an average rating of 5.40/10. The site's critics consensus reads: "Lowbrow humor and inconsistent storytelling undercut Queenpins' talented cast, making this coupon-clipping comedy a disappointingly poor bargain." On Metacritic, the film has a weighted average score of 45 out of 100, based on 20 critics, indicating "mixed or average reviews". Hauser's performance as fraud specialist Ken Miller received praise from critics who praised his onscreen chemistry with Vaughn while noting that the film established him as a comedic actor after his breakthrough role in 2019's Richard Jewell.
