= Sarah Sutherland =

American actress

- Born: Los Angeles, California, U.S.
- Citizenship: United States; United Kingdom; Canada
- Education: Tisch School of Arts
- Occupation: Actress
- Years active: 2011–present
- Parent(s): Kiefer Sutherland; Camelia Kath
- Relatives: Donald Sutherland (paternal grandfather); Shirley Douglas (paternal grandmother); Tommy Douglas (great-grandfather)

Sarah Sutherland is an American actress known for her role as Catherine Meyer in Veep.

== Early life ==
Sutherland was born in Los Angeles, California, to Kiefer Sutherland and his first wife, Camelia Kath. She is the granddaughter of Canadian actors Donald Sutherland and Shirley Douglas, and great-granddaughter of Canadian politician Tommy Douglas. As a teen, Sutherland trained at the Crossroads Drama Conservatory in Los Angeles, before heading to New York to study at New York University's Tisch School of the Arts. In her final semester, she wrote and acted in a one-woman play, The Skin of a Grape.

== Career ==
Sutherland won a Screen Actors Guild Award for Outstanding Performance by an Ensemble in a Comedy Series for season 6 of Veep.

== Filmography ==
Year	Title	Role	Notes
2012–2019	Veep	Catherine Meyer	TV series (43 episodes)
2013	Beneath the Harvest Sky	Emma	
2013	Innocence	Jen	
2014	The Newsroom	Mary	Episode: "Oh Shenandoah"
2015	Chronic	Nadia Wilson	
2017	Tim & Eric's Bedtime Stories	Dayna	Episode: "The Demotion"
2018	What They Had	Mary	
2020	The Kid Detective	Lucy	
2021	Like a House on Fire	Dara	
