= Timm Sharp =

American actor and writer

- Born: 1978 (age 47–48); Fargo, North Dakota, U.S.
- Occupations: Actor, screenwriter

Timm Sharp (born 1978) is an American actor and writer. He is known for his roles as Marshall Nesbitt in the Fox sitcom Undeclared, Doug Von Stuessen in the Fox sitcom 'Til Death, Jim in the Starz comedy Blunt Talk, and Gabe Ugliano in the Disney+ fantasy series Percy Jackson and the Olympians.

== Early life and education ==
Sharp is a native of Fargo, North Dakota. He attended Fargo North High School, and throughout school he studied at Trollwood Performing Arts program. Shortly after graduating high school, he moved to New York City to study acting at the American Academy of Dramatic Arts.

== Career ==
Sharp portrayed Marshall Nesbitt on the 2001 Fox sitcom, Undeclared, starring alongside Seth Rogen, Charlie Hunnam, Jay Baruchel, Carla Gallo, and Monica Keena. He had a recurring role on HBO's Six Feet Under, and the Fox series 'Til Death. Sharp then played Dougie in the HBO series Enlightened, created by Laura Dern and Mike White. Sharp replaced rapper-actor Mos Def in the comedy series shortly before filming began in 2010. Sharp was also a regular on the Starz cable network series Blunt Talk.

Sharp is very active in the improv community in Los Angeles and has performed with the Upright Citizens Brigade.

== Filmography ==
=== Film ===
Year	Title	Role	Notes
2002	Stark Raving Mad	Rikki Simms	
2003	King of the Ants	George	
2005	Americano	Ryan	
2005	Aurora Borealis	Hacksetter	
2005	Kicking & Screaming	Butcher Shop Employee	
2005	Fun with Dick and Jane	Jack's Assistant	
2006	Friends with Money	Richard	
2007	After Sex	Neil	
2009	Imagine That	Tod	
2009	Stuntmen	Bill Taylor	
2010	Camera Obscura	Chad	
2012	Till It Gets Weird	Laser	Short Film
2013	Beneath the Harvest Sky	Badger	
2014	Alex of Venice	Josh	
2015	The Dramatics: A Comedy	Jim	Short Film
2015	The Breakup Girl	Tim	
2016	Rainbow Time	Todd	
2017	Handsome	Lloyd Vanderwheel	
2018	The New Romantic	Ian Brooks	
2019	Good Posture	George	
2021	Together Together	Jacob	
2021	Queenpins	Gun Dealer	
2025	M3GAN 2.0	Sattler	

=== Television ===
Year	Title	Role	Notes
2000	Spin City	Second Protester	Episode: "Airplane!"
2000	Madigan Men	Diehorn	Episode: "Bachelors"
2001	The Invisible Man	Counter Guy	Episode: "Germ Theory"
2001–2002	Six Feet Under	Andy	4 episodes
2001–2003	Undeclared	Marshall Nesbitt	18 episodes
2002	Malcolm in the Middle	Dean	Episode: "Forwards Backwards"
2003	The Handler	Jason	Episode: "Off the Edge"
2004	Weekends	Greg Brown	Television film
2005	King of the Hill	Sprinter / Man with Snake (voice)	2 episodes
2005	Early Bird	Ethan Summers	Television film
2006	The Minor Accomplishments of Jackie Woodman	Todd Mudlark	Episode: "Mudlarking"
2006	Play Nice	Scott	Television film
2007	I'm in Hell	Fisher	Television film
2007–2010	'Til Death	Doug Von Stuessen	31 episodes
2008	1%	Scratch	Television film
2011–2013	Enlightened	Dougie Daniels	15 episodes
2013	Go On	Group Leader	Episode: "Go Deep"
2013, 2015	Drunk History	James T. McWilliams / Billy the Kid	2 episodes
2014	Revolution	Gould	2 episodes
2014	Mizz Miraculous	Del	Television film
2014	Beef	DJ Madbeatz	Television film
2014	Hot in Cleveland	Zed	2 episodes
2015	Kirby Buckets	Larry Zantron	Episode: "Kirby's Choice"
2015	Newsreaders	Donnovan Klipt	2 episodes
2015–2016	Blunt Talk	Jim	20 episodes
2017	Threadbare	Liam	7 episodes
2017	One Mississippi	Jack Hoffman	4 episodes
2017	Channel Zero	Tom	Television film
2018	One Day at a Time	Nurse Wally	Episode: "Not Yet"
2018	30 and Booked	Trint	2 episodes
2018	Casual	John	5 episodes
2019	You're the Worst	Quinn	Episode: "Zero Eggplants"
2019	It's Always Sunny in Philadelphia	Greg	Episode: "The Gang Gets Romantic"
2019	Room 104	Brandon	Episode: "No Hospital"
2019–2020	Briarpatch	Harold Snow	5 episodes
2021	The Great North	Greg (voice)	Episode: "Period Piece Adventure"
2021	On the Verge	William	12 episodes
2022	The Conners	Gale / River	Episode: "Peter Pan, The Backup Plan, Adventures in Babysitting, and A River Runs Through It"
2022	Love, Victor	Stuart	Episode: "The Setup"
2022	The Mighty Ducks: Game Changers	Coach Toby	5 episodes
2023	With Love	Larry	Episode: "Christmas Eve"
2023	Based on a True Story	Richard	3 episodes
2023–2024	Percy Jackson and the Olympians	Gabe Ugliano	4 episodes
2024	Apples Never Fall	Monty Fortino	Recurring role
2025	The Creep Tapes	Nick Green	Episode: "Nick"
2026	Margo's Got Money Troubles	Noah	Episode: "Homecoming"
