= Europa (2021 film) =

2021 film

- Directed by: Haider Rashid
- Starring: Adam Ali
- Release date: 14 July 2021 (Cannes)
- Running time: 75 minutes
- Countries: Iraq, Kuwait
- Language: Arabic

Europa (Arabic: أوروبا, romanized: ʾAwrūbā) is a 2021 Iraqi-Kuwaiti drama film directed by Haider Rashid. It was selected as the Iraqi entry for the Best International Feature Film at the 94th Academy Awards.

== Cast ==
- Adam Ali as Kamal
- Erfan Rashid as Erfan
- Gassid Mohammed as Gassid
- Svetlana Yancheva as Woman
- Mohamed Zouaoui as Trafficker

== See also ==
- List of submissions to the 94th Academy Awards for Best International Feature Film
- List of Iraqi submissions for the Academy Award for Best International Feature Film
