= The Way We Get By =

- Promotional film poster
- Directed by: Aron Gaudet
- Written by: Aron Gaudet, Gita Pullapilly
- Produced by: Gita Pullapilly, Aron Gaudet
- Starring: Joan Gaudet; William Knight; Jerry Mundy
- Cinematography: Aron Gaudet; Dan Ferrigan
- Edited by: Aron Gaudet
- Music by: Zack Martin
- Production companies: Team A+G Productions, Inc. and Sunny Side Up Films, Inc.
- Release date: March 11, 2009 (SXSW)
- Running time: 84 minutes
- Country: United States
- Language: English

The Way We Get By is a 2009 Emmy-nominated documentary film directed by Aron Gaudet and produced by Gita Pullapilly, about a group of senior citizens in Bangor, Maine who greet U.S. troops at the Bangor International Airport. The Way We Get By had its world premiere at the 2009 South by Southwest Film Festival. The film also won the Audience Award at the 2009 Full Frame Documentary Film Festival. AARP named The Way We Get By Best Documentary of 2009 in their ninth annual Movies For Grownups Awards.
