= Complications (TV series) =

2015 American drama television series

- Genre: Drama; Thriller
- Created by: Matt Nix
- Starring: Jason O'Mara; Jessica Szohr; Beth Riesgraf; Lauren Stamile
- Country of origin: United States
- Original language: English
- No. of seasons: 1
- No. of episodes: 10

Production
- Executive producer: Matt Nix
- Producers: Doug Hannah; Craig Siebels; Franses Simonovich; Buddy Enright
- Editors: Doug Hannah; Brian Jonason; James Kilton
- Camera setup: Single camera
- Production companies: Flying Glass of Milk Productions; Fox 21 Television Studios

Original release
- Network: USA Network
- Release: June 18 – August 13, 2015

Complications is an American drama television series created by Matt Nix. Starring Jason O'Mara and Jessica Szohr, the series aired on USA Network from June 18 through August 13, 2015. On August 28, 2015, USA Network cancelled Complications.

== Premise ==
An exhausted and disillusioned suburban ER doctor witnesses a drive-by shooting in which a little boy is seriously injured. While attending to the child's wounds, the doctor shoots and kills a street gang member in order to save the lives of himself and the boy. This one act, seen by some to make him a hero, leads to unexpected complications in his personal and professional life, which forces him to re-evaluate his beliefs about medicine and helping others.

== Cast ==
=== Main characters ===
- Jason O'Mara as Dr. John Ellison
- Jessica Szohr as Nurse Gretchen Polk, a coworker of John
- Beth Riesgraf as Samantha Ellison, John's wife
- Lauren Stamile as Dr. Bridget O'Neil, a coworker of John
- Albert C. Bates as Oliver Ellison, John & Sam Ellison's son

=== Recurring ===
- Chris Chalk as Darius
- Tim Peper as Kyle Hawkins, a lawyer and friend of Samantha
- Eric Edelstein as Jed, a friend of Gretchen
- Conphidance as CJ, cousin to Antoine and keeps Dr. John Ellison on check; affiliated with Darius
- RonReaco Lee as Dr. Quentin Harper, another ER doctor
- Brick Jackson as Maurice, CJ's best friend
- Anna Enger as Nurse Mia Joy
- Christine Horn as Sherry Perkins
- Chris Greene as Chris Maddox, affiliated with Darius
- Ty Glascoe as Boney, affiliated with Darius
- Gino Vento as Oscar 'Tico' Rodriguez, member of the Loco's gang.
- Jaiden Byrd as Antoine Tyler, the kid who was shot in the middle of the street while walking with CJ.

== Episodes ==
No.	Title	Directed by	Written by	Original release date	Prod. code	U.S. viewers (millions)
1	"Pilot"	Matt Nix	Matt Nix	June 18, 2015	BED179	1.91
2	"Infection"	Scott Peters	Matt Nix	June 18, 2015	BED101	1.91
3	"Onset"	Roger Kumble	Michael Horowitz	June 25, 2015	BED102	1.07
4	"Immune Response"	Kate Woods	Andrew Gettens & Lauren Mackenzie	July 2, 2015	BED103	1.46
5	"Outbreak"	Scott Peters	Ryan Johnson & Peter Lalayanis	July 9, 2015	BED104	1.53
6	"Diagnosis"	Arvin Brown	Greg Hart & Ameni Rozsa	July 16, 2015	BED105	1.30
7	"Fever"	Jann Turner	Michael Horowitz	July 23, 2015	BED106	1.19
8	"Relapse"	Michael Nankin	Matt Nix & LaToya Morgan	July 30, 2015	BED107	1.43
9	"Deterioration"	Craig Siebels	Ryan Johnson & Peter Lalayanis	August 6, 2015	BED108	1.17
10	"Critical Condition"	Matt Nix	Matt Nix	August 13, 2015	BED109	1.40

== Development and production ==
Matt Nix directed the pilot episode. In March 2014, USA Network ordered the pilot to series. Production began in September 2014 in Atlanta, Georgia.

== Reception ==
=== Critical response ===
Complications has received generally mixed reviews from critics. Review aggregator Rotten Tomatoes gives the show a rating of 59%, based on 17 reviews, with an average rating of 6.1/10. The site's consensus states, "Complications has no shortage of ambition - or intriguing characters and ideas - although its complicated plot occasionally beggars belief." Metacritic gives the show a score of 55 out of 100, based on 14 critics, indicating "generally mixed reviews".

=== Ratings ===
No.	Title	Original Air date	Viewership (millions) (Live+SD)	Rating/share (18–49) (Live+SD)	Rank per week on Cable
1	"Pilot"	June 18, 2015	1.91	0.4	#6
2	"Infection"	June 18, 2015	1.91	0.4	#6
3	"Onset"	June 25, 2015	1.07	0.3	#25
4	"Immune Response"	July 2, 2015	1.46	0.3	#9
5	"Outbreak"	July 9, 2015	1.53	0.5	#12
6	"Diagnosis"	July 16, 2015	1.30	0.4	#13
7	"Fever"	July 23, 2015	1.19	0.3	#15
8	"Relapse"	July 30, 2015	1.43	0.3	#18
9	"Deterioration"	August 6, 2015	1.17	0.3	#34
10	"Critical Condition"	August 13, 2015	1.40	0.3	#15
