= The Sacrament (2013 film) =

2013 American found footage horror film by Ti West

- Film festival theatrical poster
- Directed by: Ti West
- Written by: Ti West
- Produced by: Eli Roth; Jacob Jaffke; Peter Phok; Christopher Woodrow; Molly Conners
- Starring: Joe Swanberg; A. J. Bowen; Kentucker Audley; Amy Seimetz; Gene Jones
- Cinematography: Eric Robbins
- Edited by: Ti West
- Music by: Tyler Bates
- Production companies: Worldview Entertainment; Arcade Pictures
- Distributed by: Magnolia Pictures
- Release dates: September 3, 2013 (Venice Film Festival); May 1, 2014 (United States)
- Running time: 99 minutes
- Country: United States
- Language: English
- Box office: $9,221

The Sacrament is a 2013 American found footage horror film written and directed by Ti West. A. J. Bowen and Joe Swanberg play VICE journalists who document their co-worker's (Kentucker Audley) attempt to locate his sister (Amy Seimetz) after she joins a reclusive religious commune. The film's plot is inspired by the real-life events of the Jonestown Massacre of 1978.

The Sacrament premiered at the Venice Film Festival in September 2013. It was released on video on-demand on May 1, 2014, and had a limited theatrical release on June 6, 2014. It received mixed reviews from critics.

== Plot ==
Patrick, a fashion photographer, receives a letter from his sister, a recovering addict named Caroline, that invites him to visit Eden Parish, a utopian, drug-free community founded by a religious leader. When Patrick investigates, he discovers that they have moved to a secluded compound only accessible by helicopter, located in what Patrick's coworker Sam calls "a remote part of the world". Intrigued by the mystery, Patrick and Sam, along with cameraman Jake, suggest a feature documentary on the topic. The trip goes well, but the helicopter pilot warns them that he will leave with or without them the next day; they promise to be prompt. Issues first arise when they meet the guides at the airfield. Expecting only Patrick, the guides are taken aback by a film crew; they contact Father, the leader, who authorizes their entrance.

At the commune itself, armed guards delay the entry of the film crew. Feeling uneasy, Jake and Sam begin to regret the trip, but Patrick is able to smooth things over when his sister appears. Caroline enthusiastically welcomes them and apologizes for the misunderstanding. Caroline leaves with Patrick, and Jake and Sam are given their own cabin. After settling in, the two attempt to find members to interview. Several of the people open up to them and tell stories of how Father has saved them and given them new-found hope. The commune's nurse, Wendy, reveals that the commune has a well-stocked medical center funded by donations from the members, who sold off all their possessions.

Privately, the filmmakers express their skepticism but admit that the members seem happy and have accomplished much. Caroline arranges an interview with Father, and Sam prepares a list of questions. However, Father will only agree to do the interview during a public meeting. Father, an older Southerner, greets them warmly and at first answers the questions openly. However, his answers become more evasive and vaguely threatening. Near the end of the interview, Father raises the subject of Sam's pregnant wife, which Sam had mentioned earlier to Wendy. Put off-guard, Sam fumbles and loses control of the interview, and Father politely but dominantly cuts it short with roaring applause from his followers, who proceed to engage in a party.

During the party, Savannah, a young, mute girl, passes a note requesting help to Sam. When Sam and Jake attempt to locate Patrick, they find that he has been taken aside for a threesome, and a seemingly inebriated Caroline explains that they need Patrick's money. When the filmmakers search further, they discover a dissident group that wishes to leave, alleging abuse and brainwashing. Jake does not want to get involved, but Sam insists that they help despite the fact that the helicopter cannot fit them. Growing increasingly distrustful of Father and the commune, Jake and Sam anxiously wait out the night, unable to sleep.

In the morning, they find that the dissidents have become outright rebellious. Sarah, Savannah's mother, insists that they at least rescue her daughter, and Jake returns to the helicopter to delay its take-off. The pilot flatly refuses to help, but gunshots cut the conversation short. Jake flees into the forest and circles back to the helicopter; the injured pilot tells him to get the others. At the camp, Sam attempts to break up a fight, and a guard attacks him. Caroline angrily denounces him, and he is taken hostage. Father convenes the commune and forces everyone to take cyanide-laced drinks. Anyone who refuses is shot dead. Patrick, held hostage nearby, is killed when Caroline injects him with a syringe.

Jake returns to the camp, finding almost everyone dead except for armed guards. He finds Sarah and Savannah hiding in a cabin; Sarah kills her daughter to spare her from execution, and a guard kills Sarah while Jake hides. Jake finds Caroline, who says she has nothing left, and she self-immolates. When Jake finally confronts Father himself, he finds Sam bound to a chair. Father places blame on Jake and Sam for what happened to his community, despite Jake's argument and defense on Father being to blame for the deaths of everyone and for misleading them. Father pulls a gun and commits suicide. As Jake and Sam leave, they are almost shot by one of the last remaining guards but are saved by the last armed guard who shoots the guard dead. The sole remaining guard tells them to run as he stays behind to burn the community down. The two filmmakers flee back to the helicopter and use it to escape. While flying away, they watch as the fire spreads.

The scene cuts to black and states that 167 people died during the massacre of Eden Parish. The only survivors were Sam Turner and Jake Williams with their filmed documentary being the only first-hand account of the events that took place at Eden Parish.

== Cast ==
- Joe Swanberg as Jake, Sam's cameraman
- A. J. Bowen as Sam, a reporter for Vice
- Kentucker Audley as Patrick, a fashion photographer and Caroline's brother
- Amy Seimetz as Caroline, an addict who joins the commune
- Gene Jones as Father, a.k.a. Charles Anderson Reed, the leader of Eden Parish
- Donna Biscoe as Wendy, the commune's nurse
- Kate Lyn Sheil as Sarah White, a loyalist, originally from Melbourne
- Shirley Jones Byrd as Lorraine, an elderly woman
- Talia Dobbins as Savannah, a mute child
- Kate Forbes as Mindy
- Lashuan Clay as Robert, a young man from a violent neighborhood
- Dale Neal as Andre, Robert's younger brother
- Conphidance as Guide #1, who works for "Father" and does everything as he is told

== Production ==
Eli Roth signed on to produce the film in September 2012. He described the film as "West's first mainstream movie". Swanberg, Bowen, Audley, Seimetz, and Jones were announced to have joined the cast in October 2012, as it went into production. The parts were written specifically for the actors, as Roth gave West full creative control. Swanberg doubled as cameraman for parts of the film, as West trusted his background as a filmmaker to shoot the scenes without supervision. West described the film as his most horrific film yet, and said that he wanted the film's violence to be upsetting. When West cast Jones as cult leader Father, he wanted to make sure that Father seemed like a genuine, well-meaning person who nonetheless was driven to evil by his paranoia. The film was shot outside of Savannah, Georgia.

== Release ==
The Sacrament premiered at the Venice Film Festival in September 2013. It was released on video on-demand on May 1, 2014, and had a limited theatrical release on June 6, 2014. It was released on home video on August 19, 2014.

== Reception ==
Rotten Tomatoes reports that 64% of 70 surveyed critics gave the film a positive review, with an average rating was 5.86/10. The consensus reads: "While it may be a bit too slow for some, The Sacrament offers enough tense atmosphere and intriguing ideas to satisfy discerning horror buffs." Metacritic, which uses a weighted average, assigned the film a score of 49 out of 100, based on 21 critics, indicating "mixed or average" reviews.

Guy Lodge of Variety gave a mostly-positive review, commenting that making the cameraman of the found footage feature an employee of Vice magazine helped "[provide] an alibi for Eric Robbins' fluid, generously-lit lensing; most films in the found-footage genre have no reason to look this good." David Rooney of The Hollywood Reporter called it "a bone-chilling genre piece" that may disappoint horror purists. Robert Abele of the Los Angeles Times called the first half a "dread-inducing tour de force" but wrote that the second half is a disappointment that adds no insight to the real-life tragedy. Jordan Hoffman of Film.com gave an unfavorable review overall, criticizing what he saw as an overly slow story line.
