= Susan Basemera =

Ugandan singer and actress

- Other names: Zani Lady C
- Occupations: Singer, actress
- Years active: 1995-present
- Notable work: Little America

Susan Basemera also known as Lady Zani is a Ugandan singer and actress.

== Educational background ==
Basemera attended Makerere College School, Light College Katikamu, Makerere University, and Brandeis University.

== Biography ==
Originally from Uganda, Basemera began singing in school choirs at the age of eight. Known as Zani Lady C in her home country, she caught her big break in 1995, when she joined the band Waka Waka and released the song "Yimilila awo". She is famous for the song "Ndoowa", which became a hit in 1997 and is still popular. In 2012, Basemera moved to the United States to further her career. Although largely focusing on acting, she released the song "Goolo Goolo" in 2015.

In 2016, Basemera appeared in the short film Gubagudeko with Mahershala Ali. She starred as the title character in Can You Keep a Secret. In 2020, Basemera starred as Yuliana in the Apple TV+ series Little America, featuring stories of immigrants to the United States. She got the part after a director sent a flier and she emailed the contacts on the flier, impressing the crew at an audition. In one scene, she displays her heritage by wearing a gomesi.

According to Basemera, the Ugandan film industry lags behind the American film industry in terms of production, equipment, characters, and distribution. "When the Industry is well financed with experienced stakeholders then it can go places," Basemera said.

== Filmography ==
- 2012: Love Collision (voice)
- 2016: Gubagudeko
- 2016: Can You Keep a Secret
- 2020: Little America

== See also ==
- Ugandan Americans
