= Adam Ali (actor) =

British actor and filmmaker

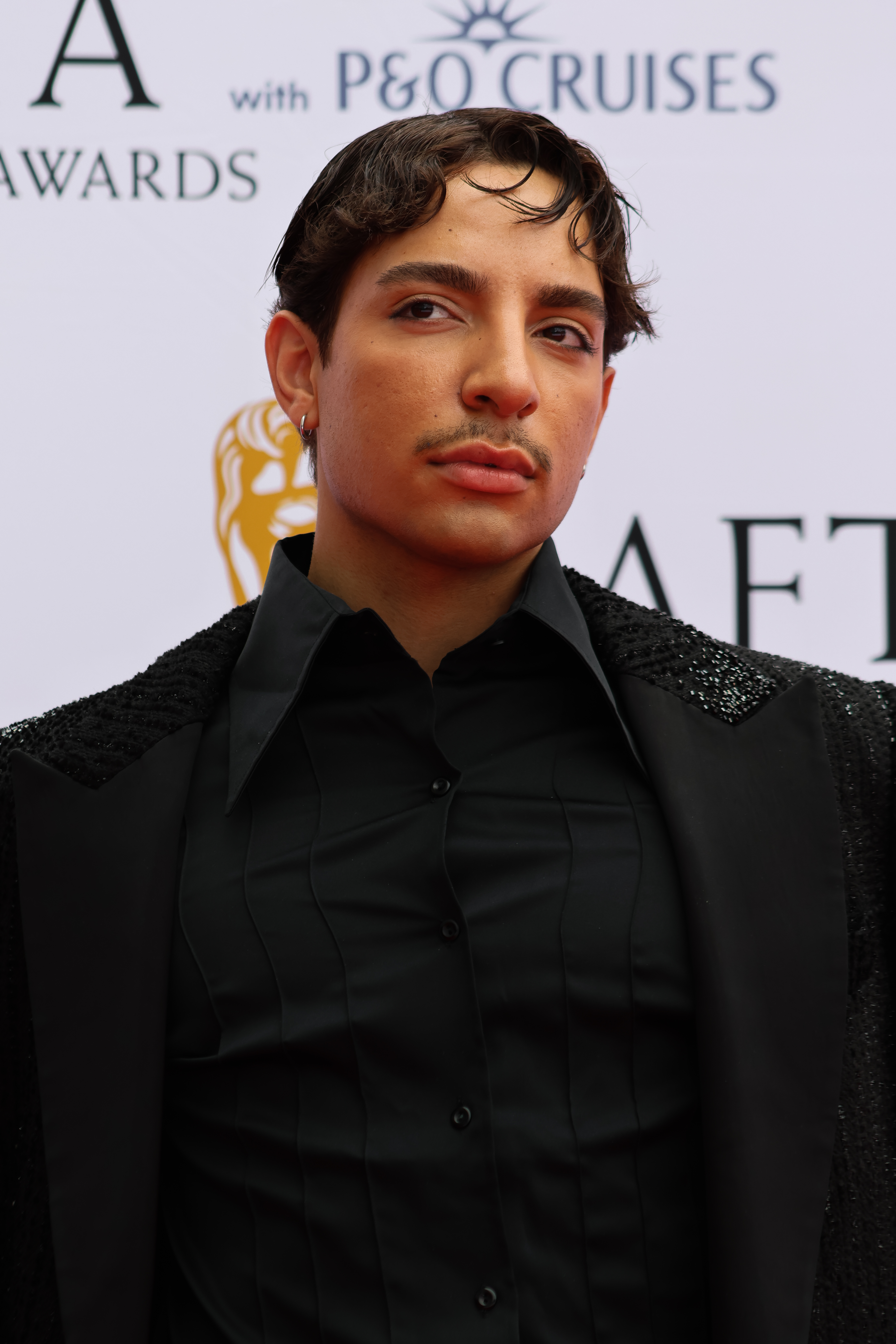
- Ali at the 2026 British Academy Television Awards
- Born: 1999 (age 26–27)
- Years active: 2019–present

Adam Ali (born 1999) is a British actor and filmmaker. Ali began their career in the Apple TV+ anthology Little America (2020) and the feature film Europa (2021). Their short film Baba (2021) won two Iris Prizes. On television, Ali has since appeared in the BBC series Waterloo Road (2023–2024) and What It Feels Like for a Girl (2025).

== Early life ==
Ali was born in Libya and fled the civil war as a young child. After stints in Canada, Italy and Bristol, the family settled in Manchester. Ali took classes at the Television Workshop in Salford.

== Career ==
Ali made their television debut in an installment of the Apple TV+ drama anthology Little America. For their performance, Ali was nominated for an Independent Spirit Award. This was followed by Ali's debut feature film role starring as Kamal in the 2021 thriller Europa directed by Haider Rashid. Ali also made their directorial debut with the short film Baba. Baba won the top Iris Prize as well as the prize in the British category.

In 2023, Ali joined the cast of the BBC One school drama Waterloo Road for its eleventh series revival as Kai Sharif. Ali also appeared in an episode of the Amazon Prime series The Power and the Switchboard short film The Call. In 2025, Ali played Dirty Damian in the BBC Three adaptation of What It Feels Like for a Girl by Paris Lees.

== Filmography ==
=== Film ===
Year	Title	Role	Notes
2019	Blind	Daniel	Short film
2021	Expiation	Junayd	Short film
2021	Europa	Kamal	
2021	Baba	Britannia	Short film; directed, wrote
2023	The Call	Amir	Short film
2025	Truckload	George	Short film

=== Television ===
Year	Title	Role	Notes
2020	Little America	Zain	Anthology: "The Son"
2023–2024	Waterloo Road	Kai Sharif	21 episodes (Series 11–14)
2023	The Power	Mahmud	Episode: "The Day of the Girls"
2024	Ludwig	Tour Guide	1 episode
2025	What It Feels Like for a Girl	Dirty Damian	7 episodes

== Awards and nominations ==
Year	Award	Category	Work	Result	Ref.
2021	Independent Spirit Awards	Best Male Performance in a Scripted Series	Little America	Nominated	
2021	Iris Prize		Baba	Won	
2021	Iris Prize	Best British Short	Baba	Won	
2021	Red Sea International Film Festival	Best Actor	Europa	Won	
2022	Flickerfest	Best Rainbow Short	Baba	Won	
2022	Critics Awards for Arab Films	Best Actor	Europa	Nominated	
