= Conphidance =

Nigerian American actor

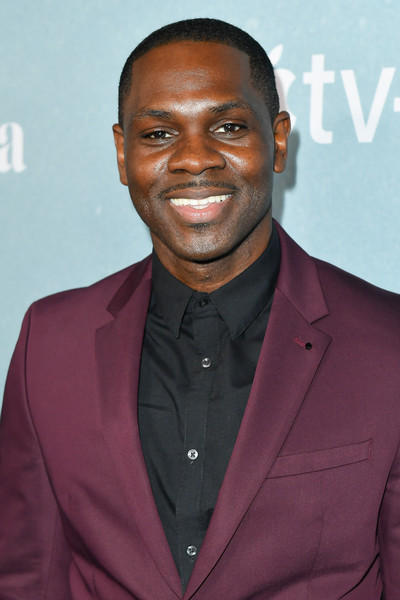
- Born: Uchenna Echeazu; Surulere, Lagos State, Nigeria
- Education: University of Florida (biological engineering)
- Occupations: Actor, writer, producer, comedian, musician
- Years active: 2011-present

Uchenna "Conphidance" Echeazu is a Nigerian American actor, writer, comedian, musician, and producer. He began his entertainment career as a dancer and drummer. He is mostly known for starring and being the face of the Apple TV+ series Little America, which earned him a nomination for Best Male Performance in a New Scripted Series.

Other notable performances include Honk for Jesus. Save Your Soul. (2022), a recurring guest star role as Pastor Balogun on Bob Hearts Abishola, playing Okoye in American Gods, Curtis "CJ" Jackson in Complications, and a supporting role in The Sacrament.

== Early life ==
Conphidance was born and raised in Nigeria. His family later moved to the United States.

== Career ==
Conphidance played the recurring role of Curtis "CJ" James Thompson in Complications opposite Chris Chalk and Jason O'Mara. Later that year, he was cast in Survivor's Remorse opposite Tichina Arnold, Teyonah Parris, and Erica Ash. He guest-starred in Hidden America with Jonah Ray and played supporting roles in The Inspectors on CBS, Satisfaction on USA Network, and Good Behavior on TNT. He appears as Okoye opposite Orlando Jones in Starz fantasy series American Gods, based on the novel by Neil Gaiman as well as the History Channel's Navy SEAL drama, Six. In films, he played supporting roles in Fist Fight, The Sacrament, and Klippers.

== Filmography ==
=== Film ===
Year	Title	Role	Notes
2012	Downline	Ikuku	
2013	Brotherly Love	Emeka	Producer
2013	The Sacrament	Guide #1	
2014	Far From the Altar	Kevin	
2016	Burning Bridges	Chase	
2016	Allegiant	Factionless Soldier	
2016	Domestic Seduction	Michael Oto/The Nigerian	
2016	Jake		Producer
2017	Fist Fight	Gangster	
2017	Lifeline	Jonah	
2017	5 Steps To Get Over Your Ex	Egypt	
2018	Klippers	Drummer	Producer
2018	Samiya	Wale	Executive Producer, Producer
2018	Cold City	Benjamin	
2018	I Am My Own Mother	Kent	
2019	Moni	Seleem	
2019	Flipped	Amare Diallo	
2022	Honk for Jesus. Save Your Soul.	Keon Sumpter	

=== Television ===
Year	Title	Role	Notes
2011–2012	Day Buy Day with Onye-Ala	Onye Ala	7 episodes; also Producer
2014	The Originals	Bandleader	
2014	Satisfaction	Musician	Episode: "Through Partnership"
2015	Complications	Curtis "CJ" Jackson	8 episodes
2015	Survivor's Remorse	Musician	Episode: "Homebound"
2016	The Inspectors	Chris Youngsten	Episode: "The One That Got Away"
2016	Good Behavior	Town Car Driver	Pilot Episode: "So You're Not an English Teacher"
2016	Hidden America with Jonah Ray	Dimici	Episode: "Atlanta: Past, Present, Living, and Dead"
2016	Going In Sketch Comedy Show	Marcell	2 episodes
2015–	Take It or Leave It with Conphidance	Himself	Producer
2017	Six	CIA Asset/Driver	Episode: "Man Down"
2017	American Gods	Okoye	Episode 1.4 "The Secret of Spoons
2017	Project Isisx	Folami	
2018	Valor	Khalid's Second Guard	Episode "1.12": "Oscar Mike"
2018	Atlanta	Owner	Episode 2.3 "Money Bag Shawty"
2018	Timeless	Dying Union Soldier	Episode 2.9 "The General"
2018	Claws	Toussaint	Episode 2.3
2019–	Bob Hearts Abishola	Pastor Balogun	Episodes 1.9, 1.17, 2.8, and 2.18
2020	Little America	Iwegbuna Ikeji	Episode 1.3 "The Cowboy"
2022	The Cleaning Lady	Dr. Nnamdi	Episode 1.6 "Mother's Mission"
