= Cyriac Pullapilly =

Indian historian

Cyriac K. Pullapilly (June 15, 1932 – December 17, 2017) was a Fellow of the Royal Society of Arts, a former priest of the Syro-Malabar Catholic Church and a professor of history at Saint Mary's College, Indiana.

== Biography ==
Cyriac Pullapilly was an only child, born in what is now Kerala, India, on June 15, 1932. Raised by his mother, Anna, he was educated at St. Thomas College and St. Joseph's Pontifical Seminary before becoming an ordained priest in the Eastern Rite Syro-Malabar Catholic Church on March 16, 1958. According to some source, the ordination was the culmination of his mother's ambitions for him, although others say that his parents were initially reluctant for him to enter the church. While attending the seminary, he wrote for a missionary publication called Home Field. He was also part of the anti-communist movement in his college and wrote various publications critical of the communist government, which controlled the legislature in his state.

Pullapilly was awarded his PhD from the University of Chicago and both he and his wife emigrated to the United States, raising their children in South Bend, Indiana. The filmmaker Gita Pullapilly is his daughter.

In 1983, he founded the Semester Around the World Program, where University of Notre Dame and Saint Mary's College, Indiana, students travelled the world and studied in India.

Pullapilly had a multi-disciplinary approach to his studies and published works on a broad range of subjects. His research was supported by the Fulbright Foundation and the National Endowment for the Humanities, and in 2006 – the year in which he was admitted to the Royal Society of Arts – he held a visiting academic post at the University of Cambridge. He also established his own publishing company and produced an "inclusive-language" edition of the New Testament.

Based upon his founding of the Semester Around the World program, Pullapilly received the Spes Unica Award from Saint Mary's College for his outstanding service to the College in 2007.

Pullapilly ended his academic career as an emeritus professor of history at Saint Mary's. He died on December 17, 2017.

== Works ==
=== Books ===
- Caesar Baronius, Counter-Reformation historian. University of Notre Dame Press. 1975. ISBN 9780268005016.
- Smith, Bardwell L., ed. (1976). "The Izhavas of Kerala and their Historic Struggle for Acceptance in the Hindu Society". Religion and Social Conflict in South Asia. BRILL. ISBN 9789004045101.
- Islam in the Contemporary World. Cross Cultural Publications/Crossroads. 1980. ISBN 9780940121003.
- East and West in the Renaissance: Essays in Cultural Interaction. Cross Cultural Publications. 2000. ISBN 9780940121461.
- Christianity and Native Cultures: Perspectives from Different Regions of the World. Cross Cultural Publications. 2004. ISBN 9780940121775.

=== Articles ===
- "The Izhavas of Kerala". Journal of Asian and African Studies. XI. 1976.
- Pullapilly, Cyriac K. (July 1992). "Agostino Valier and the Conceptual Basis of the Catholic Reformation". Harvard Theological Review. 85 (3): 307–333. doi:10.1017/S0017816000003333. S2CID 164118865.
