= Film Independent Spirit Awards =

Film awards dedicated to independent filmmakers

- Current: 41st Independent Spirit Awards
- Awarded for: Excellence in the independent film industry
- Country: United States
- Presented by: Film Independent
- First award: March 22, 1986; 40 years ago
- Website: filmindependent.org/spirit-awards

The Film Independent Spirit Awards (Fi Spirit Awards), also known as the Independent Spirit Awards or Spirit Awards, are awards presented annually to independent filmmakers by Film Independent since 1986. The awards show has been held in Santa Monica, California, historically on the Saturday before the Academy Awards, until 2023, when the ceremony was moved to the week before the Oscars, with the expectation that its winners could influence the final days of Oscar voting.

The 41st Independent Spirit Awards was held on February 15, 2026, at the Palladium in Hollywood.

== History ==
The organization was founded in 1979, by the New York-based organization Independent Feature Project, which was later renamed as The Gotham Film & Media Institute, known for organizing the Gotham Awards.

By 1981, Gregory Nava and Anna Thomas and a small semi-informal group of directors-filmmakers, writers and producers began to regularly meet, share knowledge and support each other's projects, and would be known as Independent Feature Project/West. Robert "Bob" Rosen, former Dean of the UCLA School of Theater, Film and Television, was one of the founding board members.

In 1984, the FINDIE Awards (Friends of Independents) were conceived by Independent Features Project/West board member Jeanne Lucas and Independent Features Project/West President Anne Kimmel and director/writer Sam O'Brien was an event producer. The awards were voted on by a nominating committee.

In 1985, Peter Coyote and Jamie Lee Curtis presented winners with a Plexiglas pyramid designed by Carol Bosselman, which contain a suspended shoestring, printed with sprocket holes, representing the shoestring budgets of independent films. The Reel Gold Award, also designed by Bosselman, was given to Steve Wachtel for allowing Independent Features Project/West continuing free use of his screening room. It was associated with Filmex. In 1986, Bosselman designed and sculpted the Independent Spirit Award statue that is currently presented, using a lost wax bronze casting method.

On March 22, 1986, Independent Feature Project/West inaugurated the Independent Spirit Awards at its annual awards luncheon. Whereas its Reel Gold Award and FINDIE Award were intended as general recognition for contributions to independent filmmaking, the Independent Spirit Award recognized specific achievements in independent films released during the year.

Dawn Hudson was director of Independent Features Project/West in 1995.

Barbara Boyle was Independent Features Project/West president from 1994 to 1999.

In 2001, IFP/West absorbed the Los Angeles Independent Film Festival.

In 2002, IFP restructured its regional chapters, with IFP/West becoming IFP/Los Angeles.

In May 2005, IFP/Los Angeles announced its split from the Independent Feature Project and relaunched as Film Independent (FIND).

Josh Welsh served as president of Film Independent from 2012 until his death on December 31, 2024, from colon cancer at age 62. At the 40th Independent Spirit Awards, acting president Brenda Robinson delivered a heartfelt tribute to Welsh, and honored the "visionary". Welsh was remembered for his immense contributions to the organization and the film community.

In 2020, new categories were announced for the 36th Independent Spirit Awards, which would honor the best in television productions and performances. These categories included Best New Scripted Series, Best New Non-Scripted or Documentary Series, Best Male Performance, Best Female Performance, and Best Ensemble Cast. In 2022, it was announced that gender neutral acting categories would be implemented and would replace the gendered film categories (Male Lead, Female Lead, Male Supporting and Female Supporting) in favor of a Best Lead Performance and a Best Supporting Performance categories, which would feature ten nominees each. Other new categories added included Best Breakthrough Performance and Best Lead and Supporting Performance for television.

== Description ==
The Film Independent Spirit Awards are film awards presented annually to independent filmmakers by Film Independent in a ceremony in Santa Monica. Film Independent is a not-for-profit arts organization that previously also produced the LA Film Festival.

=== Eligibility ===
As of 2024, films competing for Independent Spirit Awards must have budgets lower than $28 million, but there is no budget requirement for television shows.

=== Selection process ===
In 2015, the selection process was described thus: "In the late summer, we open up for submissions. Individual filmmakers and studios and distributors send their films to us. We assemble nominating committees in the fall. They’re composed of many different people within the industry."

== Categories ==
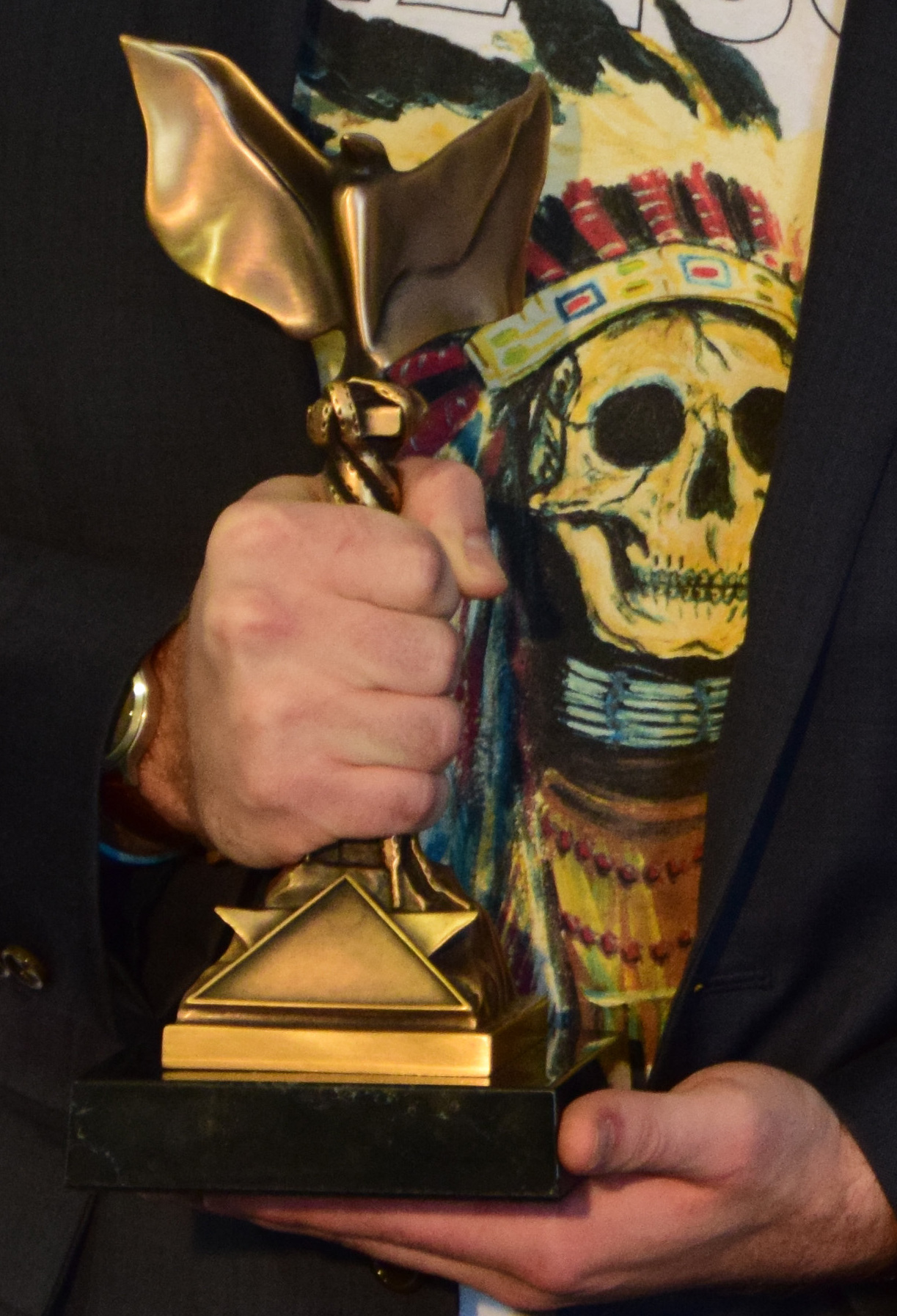
Independent Spirit Award

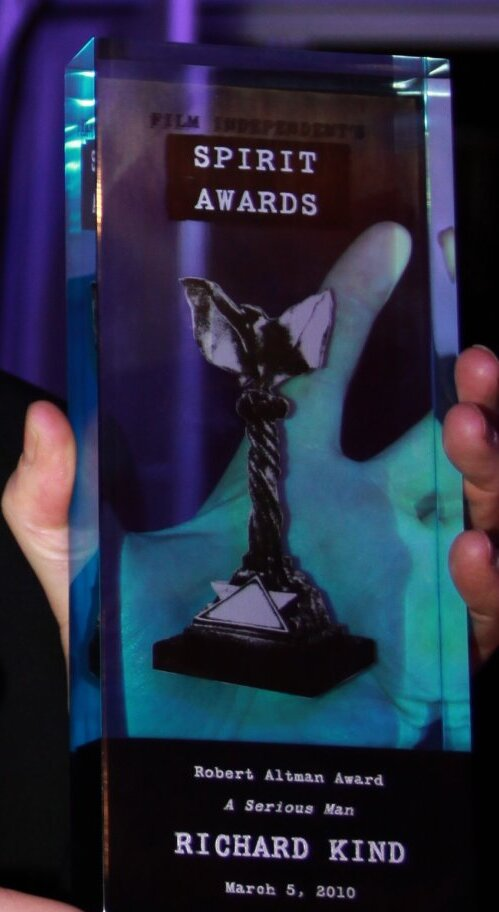
Robert Altman Award

Film categories

- Best Feature Film
- Best Director
- Best First Feature
- Best Lead Performance
- Best Supporting Performance
- Best Breakthrough Performance
- Best Screenplay
- Best First Screenplay
- Best International Feature Film
- Best International First Feature
- Best Documentary Feature Film
- Best Cinematography
- Best Editing
- John Cassavetes Award
- Robert Altman Award

Television categories

- Best New Scripted Series
- Best Lead Performance in a New Scripted Series
- Best Supporting Performance in a New Scripted Series
- Best Breakthrough Performance in a New Scripted Series
- Best New Non-Scripted or Documentary Series
- Best Ensemble Cast in a New Scripted Series

Emerging filmmakers awards

- Producers Award
- Someone to Watch Award
- Truer than Fiction Award

Digital Creator

- Digital Creator Award

Retired categories

- Best Female Lead
- Best Male Lead
- Best Supporting Female
- Best Supporting Male
- Best Female Performance in a New Scripted Series
- Best Male Performance in a New Scripted Series
- Bonnie Award

== Ceremonies ==
Formerly held at a restaurant, and a hotel, and a ballroom, it was held the day before the Academy Awards until 2020, as a luncheon event in a tented parking lot next to the ocean in Santa Monica, California.

In 2023, the ceremony was moved to the week before the Oscars, with the expectation that its winners could influence the final days of Oscar voting.

Winners were previously presented with acrylic glass pyramids containing suspended shoestrings representing the bare budgets of independent films.

=== Broadcast ===
The show was previously broadcast live on the IFC network in the US until 2023, when it was moved to YouTube, as well as Hollywood Suite in Canada and A&E Latin America.

== Past winners ==
#	Date	Year Honored	Best Film	Best First Feature	Host(s)
1st	March 22, 1986	1985	After Hours	—	Peter Coyote
2nd	March 28, 1987	1986	Platoon	She's Gotta Have It	Buck Henry
3rd	February 11, 1988	1987	River's Edge	Dirty Dancing	Buck Henry
4th	March 25, 1989	1988	Stand and Deliver	Mystic Pizza	Buck Henry
5th	March 24, 1990	1989	Sex, Lies, and Videotape	Heathers	Buck Henry
6th	March 23, 1991	1990	The Grifters	Metropolitan	Buck Henry
7th	March 28, 1992	1991	Rambling Rose	Straight Out of Brooklyn	Buck Henry
8th	March 27, 1993	1992	The Player	The Waterdance	Buck Henry
9th	March 19, 1994	1993	Short Cuts	El Mariachi	Robert Townsend
10th	March 25, 1995	1994	Pulp Fiction	Spanking the Monkey	Kevin Pollak
11th	March 23, 1996	1995	Leaving Las Vegas	The Brothers McMullen	Samuel L. Jackson
12th	March 22, 1997	1996	Fargo	Sling Blade	Samuel L. Jackson
13th	March 21, 1998	1997	The Apostle	Eve's Bayou	John Turturro
14th	March 20, 1999	1998	Gods and Monsters	The Opposite of Sex	Queen Latifah
15th	March 25, 2000	1999	Election	Being John Malkovich (Over $500,000); The Blair Witch Project (Under $500,000)	Jennifer Tilly
16th	March 24, 2001	2000	Crouching Tiger, Hidden Dragon	You Can Count on Me; Chuck & Buck (Under $500,000)	John Waters
17th	March 23, 2002	2001	Memento	In the Bedroom	John Waters
18th	March 22, 2003	2002	Far from Heaven	The Dangerous Lives of Altar Boys	John Waters
19th	February 28, 2004	2003	Lost in Translation	Monster	John Waters
20th	February 26, 2005	2004	Sideways	Garden State	Samuel L. Jackson
21st	March 4, 2006	2005	Brokeback Mountain	Crash	Sarah Silverman
22nd	February 24, 2007	2006	Little Miss Sunshine	Sweet Land	Sarah Silverman
23rd	February 23, 2008	2007	Juno	The Lookout	Rainn Wilson
24th	February 21, 2009	2008	The Wrestler	Synecdoche, New York	Steve Coogan
25th	March 5, 2010	2009	Precious	Crazy Heart	Eddie Izzard
26th	February 26, 2011	2010	Black Swan	Get Low	Joel McHale
27th	February 25, 2012	2011	The Artist	Margin Call	Seth Rogen
28th	February 23, 2013	2012	Silver Linings Playbook	The Perks of Being a Wallflower	Andy Samberg
29th	March 1, 2014	2013	12 Years a Slave	Fruitvale Station	Patton Oswalt
30th	February 21, 2015	2014	Birdman or (The Unexpected Virtue of Ignorance)	Nightcrawler	Fred Armisen, Kristen Bell
31st	February 27, 2016	2015	Spotlight	The Diary of a Teenage Girl	Kate McKinnon, Kumail Nanjiani
32nd	February 25, 2017	2016	Moonlight	The Witch	Nick Kroll, John Mulaney
33rd	March 3, 2018	2017	Get Out	Ingrid Goes West	Nick Kroll, John Mulaney
34th	February 23, 2019	2018	If Beale Street Could Talk	Sorry to Bother You	Aubrey Plaza
35th	February 8, 2020	2019	The Farewell	Booksmart	Aubrey Plaza
36th	April 22, 2021	2020	Nomadland	Sound of Metal	Melissa Villaseñor
37th	March 6, 2022	2021	The Lost Daughter	7 Days	Megan Mullally, Nick Offerman
38th	March 4, 2023	2022	Everything Everywhere All at Once	Aftersun	Hasan Minhaj
39th	February 25, 2024	2023	Past Lives	A Thousand and One	Aidy Bryant
40th	February 22, 2025	2024	Anora	Dìdi	Aidy Bryant
41st	February 15, 2026	2025	Train Dreams	Lurker	Ego Nwodim

== See also ==
- American Cinematheque
- Sundance Film Festival
- Indiewood
- Gotham Awards
