= Annie Silverstein =

American film director and screenwriter

- Education: Macalester College, University of Texas at Austin
- Occupations: Film Director, Screenwriter
- Years active: 2004 - present

Annie Silverstein is an American film director and screenwriter.

== Early life ==
Annie was born and raised in Oakland, California. She graduated from Macalester College. with a BA in American History, and in 2013 received an MFA in Film Production from the University of Texas at Austin.

== Career ==
Silverstein's short documentary Noc na Tanečku: Night at the Dance premiered at SXSW in 2011. She returned to SXSW the following year with her fiction short Spark.

In 2014 Silverstein's short film Skunk premiered at the Cannes Film Festival - Cinefondation and won the first place jury award, presided over by Abbas Kiarostami. She was named one of Filmmaker Magazine's 25 New Faces of Indie Film in 2014.

Silverstein's feature debut Bull was selected for the 2016 Sundance Screenwriter's Lab and directors Lab. Bull premiered at the 2019 Cannes Film Festival - Un Certain Regard, and went on to screen at the Deauville American Film Festival where it won the Grand Prize, Revelation Prize, and Critics’ Prize. Bull premiered in the US at Film Independent's ‘New Wave,’ and was selected to screen in the Festival Favorites section at SXSW 2020. Bull was acquired by Samuel Goldwyn Films (domestic) and Sony Pictures Worldwide (international).

Silverstein often cites the 10 years she spent as a youth worker prior to film school as her greatest influence. In 2004, Silverstein co-founded Longhouse Media, a non-profit indigenous media arts organization, based in Seattle, in partnership with the Swinomish Indian Tribal Community. Longhouse Media's “Native Lens” program teaches Native youth in rural and urban settings filmmaking as a form of inquiry, community development, and cultural pride and preservation. In 2007 Silverstein received a Fulbright scholarship to spend a year in Rio de Janeiro, teaching a weekly filmmaking and media literacy course at an orphanage for teenage boys. For her work with Longhouse Media, Silverstein received the National Association for Media Literacy Award for outstanding contributions made in the field of media education in 2009.

== Personal life ==
Annie is married to screenwriter and producer Johnny McAllister. They frequently collaborate on scripts together, and co-wrote Bull. They have two children. Annie is the sister of Jake Silverstein, editor of the New York Times Magazine.

== Filmography ==
Year	Title	Credited As	Notes
2008	March Point	Director, producer, cinematographer	PBS Independent Lens (2008), Presented at Smithsonian's National Museum of the American Indian, IFC Award for Best Documentary, imagineNATIVE
2011	Noc na Tanečku: Night at the Dance	Director, producer, cinematographer, editor	Hamptons International Film Festival Student Award
2012	Spark	Writer, director, editor	2012 SXSW Best Texas Short Jury Award
2014	Skunk	Writer, director	2014 Cannes Film Festival - Cinéfondation 1st Prize Jury Award; 2014 BAFTA/LA Student Film Award; 2014 Austin Film Festival Best Short Film & Special Jury Prize; 2015 Bermuda International Film Festival Best Narrative Short; 2015 Ashland Independent Film Festival Best International Short; 2015 American Short Film Awards, Best Drama Short Film
2019	Bull	Writer, director	2019 Cannes Film Festival, Nominee Un Certain Regard Award, Nominee Golden Camera: 2019 Deauville Film Festival, Winner of Grand Prize, Critics Award, & Revelations Prize; 2019 SXSW Louis Black “Lone Star” Award Special Jury Recognition for Acting - Rob Morgan
