= Little America (TV series) =

American anthology streaming television series

- Genre: Anthology
- Based on: Little America by Epic Magazine
- Developed by: Lee Eisenberg & Emily V. Gordon & Kumail Nanjiani
- Starring: Suraj Sharma; Jearnest Corchado; Rishi Danda; Conphidance; Mélanie Laurent; Kemiyondo Coutinho; Shaun Toub; Angela Lin
- Composer: Michael Brook
- Country of origin: United States
- Original language: English
- No. of seasons: 2
- No. of episodes: 16

Production
- Executive producers: Kumail Nanjiani; Alan Yang; Lee Eisenberg; Emily V. Gordon; Sian Heder; Joshuah Bearman; Joshua Davis
- Camera setup: Single-camera
- Running time: 30 minutes
- Production companies: Alan Yang Pictures; Quantity Entertainment (season 1); Piece of Work Productions (season 2); Epic Magazine; Universal Television

Original release
- Network: Apple TV+
- Release: January 17, 2020 – December 9, 2022

Little America is an American anthology television series produced for Apple TV+. It premiered on January 17, 2020. The series was renewed for a second season, which premiered on December 9, 2022.

== Premise ==
Little America looks to "go beyond the headlines to look at the funny, romantic, heartfelt, inspiring and unexpected lives of immigrants in America, at a time when their stories are more relevant than ever."

== Cast ==
=== The Manager ===
- Suraj Sharma as Kabir
  - Eshan Inamdar as young Kabir
    - Ishan Gandhi as preteen Kabir
- Sherilyn Fenn as Laura Bush
- Priyanka Bose as Kabir's Mother

=== The Jaguar ===
- Jearnest Corchado as Marisol
- Melinna Bobadilla as Gloria
- John Ortiz as Squash Coach
- Jamie Gore Pawlik as Charlotte Ansley
- Chelsea Patricia Ramirez as Shirley

=== The Cowboy ===
- Conphidance as Iwegbuna
- Tom McCarthy as Professor Robbins
- Chinaza Uche as Chioke
- Ebbe Bassey as Mma Udeh

=== The Silence ===
- Mélanie Laurent as Sylviane
- Zachary Quinto as Spiritual Leader
- Bill Heck as Jack
- Gavin Lee as Henry

=== The Baker ===
- Kemiyondo Coutinho as Beatrice
- Innocent Ekakitie as Brian
- Susan Basemera as Yuliana
- Philip Luswata as Beatrice's Father

=== The Grand Prize Expo Winners ===
- Angela Lin as Ai
- X. Lee as Bo
- Madeleine Chang as Cheng

=== The Rock ===
- Shaun Toub as Faraz
- Shila Vosough Ommi as Yasmin
- Justin Ahdoot as Behrad

=== The Son ===
- Haaz Sleiman as Rafiq
- Adam Ali as Zain
- Fahim Fazli as Taliban commander

=== The 9th Caller ===
- Isuri Wijesundara as Sachini

== Episodes ==
Series overview
Season	Episodes	Originally released
1	8	January 17, 2020
2	8	December 9, 2022

=== Season 1 (2020) ===
No. overall	No. in season	Title	Directed by	Teleplay by	Original release date
1	1	"The Manager"	Deepa Mehta	Rajiv Joseph	January 17, 2020
2	2	"The Jaguar"	Aurora Guerrero	Dan LeFranc	January 17, 2020
3	3	"The Cowboy"	Bharat Nalluri	Story by : Janicza Bravo & Brian Savelson; Teleplay by : Brian Savelson & Mfoniso Udofia	January 17, 2020
4	4	"The Silence"	Sian Heder	Sian Heder	January 17, 2020
5	5	"The Baker"	Chioke Nassor	Casallina Kisakye	January 17, 2020
6	6	"The Grand Prize Expo Winners"	Tze Chun	Tze Chun	January 17, 2020
7	7	"The Rock"	Nima Nourizadeh	Lee Eisenberg & Emily V. Gordon & Kumail Nanjiani	January 17, 2020
8	8	"The Son"	Stephen Dunn	Amrou Al-Kadhi & Stephen Dunn	January 17, 2020

=== Season 2 (2022) ===
No. overall	No. in season	Title	Directed by	Teleplay by	Original release date
9	1	"Mr. Song"	Deepa Mehta	Teleplay by : Sian Heder & Alan Yang; Story by : Jenny Zhang & Sian Heder	December 9, 2022
10	2	"The Bra Whisperer"	Tara Miele	Mfoniso Udofia	December 9, 2022
11	3	"The 9th Caller"	Tinge Krishnan	Emily V. Gordon & Kumail Nanjiani	December 9, 2022
12	4	"Camel on a Stick"	Sunu Gonera	Lee Eisenberg & Idil Ibrahim	December 9, 2022
13	5	"Space Door"	Darya Zhuk	Darya Zhuk & Erika Sheffer	December 9, 2022
14	6	"Columbus Starlings LLC"	Diane Paragas	Naomi Brodkin & Ali Liebegott	December 9, 2022
15	7	"Paper Piano"	Aron Gaudet & Gita Pullapilly	Brian Savelson	December 9, 2022
16	8	"The Indoor Arm"	Patricia Riggen	Joe Hortua	December 9, 2022

== Production ==
On February 8, 2018, it was announced that Apple was developing a television series based on the true stories collection "Little America" featured in Epic Magazine. The show was set to be written by Lee Eisenberg, Kumail Nanjiani, and Emily V. Gordon, all of whom also executive produced alongside Sian Heder, Alan Yang, Joshuah Bearman, and Joshua Davis. Arthur Spector acted as co-executive producer. The series was showrun by Lee Eisenberg and Sian Heder. Production companies involved with the series include Universal Television. On June 19, 2018, it was announced that Apple had given the production a series order. The show began filming in New Jersey at Kearny Point in early 2019; however, the eighth episode of the first season, "The Son" (which is about a gay asylum seeker from Syria), was shot in the Canadian province of Quebec because the American Executive Order 13780 prevented some of its actors from being able to enter the United States for filming.

The series was renewed for a second season in December 2019, prior to the series premiere. The second season premiered on December 9, 2022, with an eight episode season.

== Reception ==
=== Critical response ===
On Rotten Tomatoes, the first season has an approval rating of 95% based on 37 reviews, with an average rating of 8.92/10. The site's critics' consensus is, "Joyous, heartfelt, and very human, Little America's thoughtful collection of immigrant tales is as inspirational as it is relatable." The second season has an approval rating of 100% based on 10 reviews. On Metacritic, the series has a score of 85 out of 100 based on 26 reviews, indicating "universal acclaim".

The Atlantic's Hannah Giorgis wrote of the first season, "Its ambitions aren't flashy, but Little America leads with a clear investment in the kinds of people often relegated to the background of other shows. It's a smart, empathetic choice—one that benefits both Apple and viewers." Brian Lowry of CNN said, "The subjects vary, but almost without exception the stories are quirky yet resonant, emotional and relatable, with a sweet (or occasionally slightly bittersweet) payoff."

Reviewing the second season, Craig Matheson of The Sydney Morning Herald wrote, "Just over a half hour in length, these new episodes have a modest but enduring insight and empathy". RogerEbert.com's Clint Worthington wrote, "in its unassuming nature and casual confidence, not to mention the heartwarming humanism of its stories, it might be one of the streamer's greatest secret weapons."

=== Accolades ===
Year	Award	Category	Recipient(s)	Result	Ref.
2020	Imagen Foundation Awards	Best Primetime Program – Comedy	Little America	Nominated	
2020	Imagen Foundation Awards	Best Director – Television	Aurora Guerrero	Nominated	
2020	Imagen Foundation Awards	Best Actress – Television	Jearnest Corchado	Won	
2020	Imagen Foundation Awards	Best Supporting Actor – Television	John Ortiz	Won	
2020	Location Managers Guild Awards	Outstanding Locations in a Limited Anthology Television Series	Michael Hartel, Rocco Nisivoccia and Adrian Knight	Won	
2021	British Academy Television Awards	Best International Programme	Little America	Nominated	
2021	GLAAD Media Awards	Special Recognition	“The Son”	Won	
2021	Independent Spirit Awards	Best New Scripted Series	Little America	Nominated	
2021	Independent Spirit Awards	Best Male Performance in a New Scripted Series	Conphidance	Nominated	
2021	Independent Spirit Awards	Best Male Performance in a New Scripted Series	Adam Ali	Nominated	
2021	NAACP Image Awards	Outstanding Writing in a Comedy Series	Lee Eisenberg, Kumail Nanjiani and Emily V, Gordon (for "The Rock")	Nominated	
2021	NAACP Image Awards	Outstanding Writing in a Comedy Series	Rajiv Joseph (for "The Manager")	Nominated	
2021	NAACP Image Awards	Outstanding Directing in a Comedy Series	Aurora Guerrero (for "The Jaguar")	Nominated	
