= Gita Pullapilly =

American film director

- Born: South Bend, Indiana, U.S.
- Citizenship: American
- Education: B.B.A. (Finance); M.A. (Journalism)
- Alma mater: University of Notre Dame; Medill School of Journalism, Northwestern University
- Years active: 2007–present
- Notable work: The Way We Get By; Queenpins
- Father: Cyriac Pullapilly

Gita Pullapilly is an American director, writer, producer, and former television journalist.

== Early life and education ==
Pullapilly was born in South Bend, Indiana and has family in Kerala and Belgaum, India. During her childhood, she frequently traveled with her father, Cyriac Pullapilly, as part of an educational program, called Semester Around the World, which helped her to understand political and historical events, and learned to write stories as a journalist and filmmaker. Pullapilly studied off and on in India and in the United States.

Pullapilly studied finance at University of Notre Dame, receiving her B.B.A. and received her M.A. in journalism at the Medill School of Journalism, Northwestern University. She was awarded a Fulbright Scholarship in 2005. She was chosen as the first filmmaker to become a Fulbright Senior Scholar to Jordan. Pullapilly was a Presidential Leadership Scholar in the class of 2019.

== Career ==
In 2007, Pullapilly was selected as a WGBH Filmmaker-in-Residence where she edited the Emmy-nominated feature documentary, The Way We Get By for PBS' POV. The Way We Get By was nominated for a News and Documentary Emmy Awards in 2010. The film had its world premiere at the South by Southwest Film Festival. That year, she was selected as one of Independent Magazine's "Filmmakers to Watch." Pullapilly and her writing partner Aron Gaudet were invited to the White House in 2009 with the three subjects of the film, Joan Gaudet, Bill Knight, and Jerry Mundy.

Pullapilly and Gaudet wrote, produced and directed a film entitled Beneath The Harvest Sky (formerly called Blue Potato), which was also produced with her sister, Kavita Pullapilly. The film had its world premiere at the Toronto International Film Festival and was acquired by Tribeca Films.

Pullapilly was selected as one of Variety's "10 Directors To Watch" with Gaudet for 2014 and won the "Euphoria Calvin Klein Spotlight on Women Filmmakers Live the Dream Grant" at the Gotham Awards.

In 2015, Pullapilly and Gaudet were jointly appointed Guggenheim Fellows to support their project, titled Crook County; the script was included on the 2015 Black List, a survey of popular unproduced screenplays.

In January 2016, the University of Notre Dame Alumni Board awarded Pullapilly the Rev. Anthony J. Lauck Award, given to a graduate for outstanding accomplishments or achievements as a practicing artist.

In 2018, Pullapilly and her film partner, Aron Gaudet, were mentees in the Half Initiative, shadowing on the FX television series, American Horror Story. Ryan Murphy launched Half aiming to make Hollywood more inclusive by creating equal opportunities for women and minorities behind the camera.

In 2020, Pullapilly and Gaudet directed Queenpins, starring Kristen Bell, Kirby Howell Baptiste, Vince Vaughn, and Paul Walter Hauser.

In 2022, Pullapilly and Gaudet wrote their first book, "Inspiration To Get You Through a F*cked Up Year."

In 2023, Pullapilly and Gaudet directed an episode of Little America for Apple TV. In 2025, they directed two episodes of Season 4 of Tulsa King starring Sylvester Stallone for 101 Studios and Paramount+.

== Personal life ==
Pullapilly married her filmmaking partner Aron Gaudet in October 2009 in Stockton Springs, Maine.
