= Mynette Louie =

American film producer

- Born: New York City, New York, U.S.
- Other name: 雷敏妮 (Chinese name)
- Education: Harvard University (BA); Hunter College High School
- Occupations: Film producer Film professor
- Years active: 2004—present

Mynette Louie is an American film producer of Chinese descent. She was nominated for a Primetime Emmy and Critics Choice Award in 2018 for HBO's The Tale, won the 2015 Independent Spirit Awards John Cassavetes Award for Land Ho!, and won the 2013 Independent Spirit Awards Piaget Producers Award. She was also nominated twice for "Best First Feature" at the Independent Spirit Awards for I Carry You With Me and The Tale. She is a member of the Academy of Motion Picture Arts and Sciences.

== Background ==
Louie was born in Manhattan, New York to working-class immigrant parents from Hong Kong and China. She was raised in Brooklyn and Honolulu, and graduated from Hunter College High School and Harvard University.

== Career ==
After working in marketing and business development at Time Magazine, Jupiter Communications, and SportsIllustrated.com, Louie learned film producing by producing NYU Tisch graduate thesis films, though she did not attend the school.

Louie has premiered nine feature films at the Sundance Film Festival: Suzanne Andrew Correa's The Huntress, Heidi Ewing's I Carry You With Me, Jennifer Fox's The Tale starring Laura Dern, Isabelle Nélisse, Ellen Burstyn, Jason Ritter, Elizabeth Debicki, and Common; Christina Choe's Nancy starring Andrea Riseborough, J Smith Cameron, Steve Buscemi, Ann Dowd, and John Leguizamo, Hannah Fidell's "The Long Dumb Road" starring Tony Revolori and Jason Mantzoukas; So Yong Kim's Lovesong starring Riley Keough and Jenna Malone; Martha Stephens & Aaron Katz's Land Ho! starring Paul Eenhoorn (Sundance 2014, Sony Pictures Classics, Spirit Award nominee); Marshall Lewy's California Solo starring Robert Carlyle (Sundance 2012, Strand Releasing); and Tze Chun's Children of Invention starring Cindy Cheung (Sundance 2009).

Her films have also premiered or screened at the New York Film Festival, Toronto International Film Festival, Venice Critics Week, SXSW, Tribeca Film Festival, Locarno Film Festival, BFI London Film Festival, and Berlin Film Festival.

Her first feature was Andrew Bujalski's critically acclaimed Mutual Appreciation (SXSW 2005), which she co-produced. Louie also produced or executive produced Aaron Katz's Gemini starring Lola Kirke, Zoë Kravitz and John Cho (SXSW 2017, NEON), Sarah Adina Smith's Buster's Mal Heart starring Rami Malek (Toronto 2016), Natalia Garagiola's Temporada de Caza (Hunting Season) (Venice Critics Week 2017, Grand Prize), Lauren Wolkstein & Christopher Radcliff's The Strange Ones (SXSW 2017), Karyn Kusama's The Invitation (SXSW 2015), Jamie Babbit's Addicted to Fresno (SXSW 2015), Patricia Benoit's Stones in the Sun starring Edwidge Danticat (Tribeca 2012, Special Jury Prize, Best Narrative Director), Doug Karr's Art Machine (Woodstock 2012), Ishai Setton's The Kitchen (Gen Art 2012, Closing Night), Olivia Silver's Arcadia starring John Hawkes (Berlin 2012, Crystal Bear Winner), and Tze Chun's Cold Comes the Night starring Alice Eve, Logan Marshall-Green, and Bryan Cranston (Sony/Goldwyn 2014).

Louie previously served as the president of Gamechanger Films, a financing company that invested in women-directed narrative features.

Louie also worked in economic development at the Hawaii Film Office, where she authored the state's refundable production tax credit and oversaw the renovation of the state-owned film studio. She was named one of Business Insider's "12 Movie Producers to Watch in 2020 and Beyond," listed as one of Ted Hope's "21 Brave Thinkers of Truly Free Film" for the distribution strategy of Children of Invention, profiled in Indiewire's "Futures" column and in Crain's New York Business, and named one of Indiewire's "100 Filmmakers to Follow on Twitter." She serves on the Board of Directors of Film Independent and is a member of Producers United. She has served as an advisor to the Sundance Institute, SXSW, The Gotham, and A3 Asian American Artists Foundation. Her production company The Population previously had a first-look deal with Topic Studios.

Louie was invited to become a member of the Producers Branch of the Academy of Motion Picture Arts and Sciences in 2016, and has served on the Producers Branch Executive Committee since 2020. In 2022, she was appointed Assistant Professor of Professional Practice and Co-Head of Creative Producing in the graduate film program at Columbia University School of the Arts.

== Producing filmography ==
- Mutual Appreciation (2006) – Co-Producer
- Children of Invention (2009) – Producer
- Soundtrack for a Revolution (2009) – Line Producer
- California Solo (2012) – Producer
- Arcadia (2012) – Consulting Producer
- Stones in the Sun (2012) – Producer
- The Kitchen (2012) – Executive Producer
- Art Machine (2012) – Producer
- Cold Comes the Night (2014) – Producer, Second Unit Director
- Land Ho! (2014) – Producer
- Addicted to Fresno (2015) - Executive Producer
- The Invitation (2015) – Executive Producer
- Lovesong (2016) - Executive Producer
- Buster's Mal Heart (2016) - Executive Producer
- Gemini (2017) - Producer
- The Strange Ones (2017) - Executive Producer
- Hunting Season (2018) - Co-Producer
- The Tale (2018) - Producer
- Nancy (2018) - Executive Producer
- The Long Dumb Road (2018) - Executive Producer
- Swallow (2019) - Producer
- Black Box (2020) - Executive Producer
- I Carry You With Me (2021) - Producer
- Catch the Fair One (2022) - Executive Producer
- Somewhere Quiet (2023) - Executive Producer
- Rosemead (2025) - Producer
- The Huntress (2026) - Producer
