= Geralyn Dreyfous =

American film producer

Geralyn White Dreyfous
- Occupation: Film producer

Geralyn White Dreyfous is an American film producer. She has produced multiple documentary and narrative films focusing on social justice issues including The Invisible War (2012), The Square (2013), The Hunting Ground (2015), Won't You Be My Neighbor? (2018), The Great Hack (2019), and On the Record (2020). Dreyfous has been nominated for Primetime Emmy awards.

== Early life ==
Dreyfous Grew up in Groveland, Massachusetts. Early in her career, she worked at The Philanthropic Initiative in Boston. She taught Documentary and Narrative writing with Dr. Robert Coles at Harvard University.

== Career ==
Dreyfous is the chair and co-founder of the Utah Film Center, which provides funding to filmmakers. In 2007, Dreyfous co-founded Impact Partners, a documentary production company alongside Dan Cogan. In 2013, Dreyfous co-founded Gamechanger Films, a production company which only finances films directed by women.

Dreyfous has produced multiple films which have gone on to receive Academy Award and Emmy Award nominations. Including Born into Brothels (2005) directed by Zana Briski and Ross Kauffman, which won the Academy Award for Best Documentary Feature. The Invisible War (2012), directed by Kirby Dick, The Square (2013) directed by Jehane Noujaim, and The Hunting Ground (2015) directed by Kirby Dick.

Dreyfous has been nominated for two Primetime Emmy awards for producing Brave Miss World (2013), directed by Cecilia Peck, and The Great Hack (2019), directed by Jehane Noujaim and Karim Amer.

In 2013, Dreyfous was honored by the International Documentary Association with the Amicus Award. Additionally, Dreyfous was honored by Variety for the 2014 Women’s Impact Report.

In 2020, Dreyfous produced 76 Days directed by Hao Wu, Weixi Chen and Anonymous, revolving around the early days of the COVID-19 pandemic. The film won a Peabody Award and a Primetime Emmy Award for Exceptional Merit in Documentary Filmmaking. In 2021, Dreyfous was nominated for a Peabody Award as one of the executive producers of the docuseries Nuclear Family.

== Filmography ==
=== Film ===
Year	Title	Notes
2003	The Day My God Died	executive producer
2004	Born into Brothels	executive producer
2008	Kick Like a Girl	co-producer
2008	In a Dream	executive producer
2008	The Dhamma Brothers	executive producer
2008	Waiting for Hockney	executive producer
2008	Project Kashmir	executive producer
2008	Living in Emergency	executive producer
2008	Paints on a Ceiling	executive producer
2009	Sergio	co-executive producer
2010	Lead with Love	executive producer
2011	Miss Representation	executive producer
2011	Connected: An Autoblogography About Love, Death and Technology	executive producer
2011	Boys of Bonneville: Racing on a Ribbon of Salt	executive producer
2012	The Invisible War	executive producer
2012	Sugar Babies: Two Epidemics of Diabetes in Our Children	executive producer
2013	Open Heart	executive producer
2013	The Square	executive producer
2013	The Crash Reel	executive producer
2013	Anita: Speaking Truth to Power	executive producer
2013	Brave Miss World	executive producer
2013	China in Three Words	executive producer
2013	Wrenched	executive producer
2014	Alive Inside: A Story of Music and Memory	executive producer
2014	Land Ho!	executive producer
2014	Vessel	executive producer
2014	Meet the Patels	executive producer
2014	Compared To What: The Improbable Journey Of Barney Frank	executive producer
2014	Unbreakable	executive producer
2014	Crescendo! The Power of Music	executive producer
2015	In Football We Trust	executive producer
2015	The Hunting Ground	executive producer
2015	Hot Girls Wanted	executive producer
2015	Dreamcatcher	executive producer
2015	The Mask You Live In	executive producer
2015	Prophet's Prey	executive producer
2015	The Invitation	executive producer
2015	Addicted to Fresno	executive producer
2015	The Many Sad Fates of Mr. Toledano	executive producer
2015	Song of Lahore	executive producer
2015	All Eyes and Ears	executive producer
2015	Dogtown Redemption	executive producer
2015	The Millennials	executive producer
2016	Lovesong	executive producer
2016	Obit	executive producer
2016	Money Monster	associate producer
2016	Franca: Chaos and Creation	executive producer
2016	Defying the Nazis: The Sharps' War	executive producer
2016	The Journey is the Destination	executive producer
2016	Buster's Mal Heart	executive producer
2016	City of Joy	executive producer
2016	Swift Current	executive producer
2016	Dying in Vein: The Opiate Generation	executive producer
2017	Step	executive producer
2017	Bending the Arc	executive producer
2017	I Am Jane Doe	executive producer
2017	Embargo	executive producer
2017	The Strange Ones	executive producer
2017	The Last Animals	executive producer
2017	Eating Animals	executive producer
2017	Hunting Season	executive producer
2017	The Rape of Recy Taylor	executive producer
2017	The Judge	executive producer
2017	Open Shadow: The Story of Teal Swan	executive producer
2017	Of Fathers and Sons	executive producer
2017	Voyeur	executive producer
2017	The World is My Country	executive producer
2017	Undiagnosed	executive producer
2018	Generation Wealth	executive producer
2018	Our New President	executive producer
2018	Won't You Be My Neighbor?	executive producer
2018	The Tale	executive producer
2018	Nancy	co-executive producer
2018	Bisbee '17	executive producer
2018	The Long Dumb Road	executive producer
2018	The Feeling of Being Watched	executive producer
2018	The Way Madness Lies..	executive producer
2018	Be Natural: The Untold Story of Alice Guy-Blaché	Executive producer
2018	Divide and Conquer: The Story of Roger Ailes	executive producer
2018	Wrestling Ghosts	executive producer
2018	Still Plays with Trains	executive producer
2018	Cracked Up	executive producer
2018	Bleed Out	executive producer
2019	Where We Disappear	executive producer
2019	Always in Season	executive producer
2019	The Great Hack	executive producer
2019	Fantastic Fungi	executive producer
2019	16 Shots	executive producer
2019	Cooked: Survival by Zip Code	executive producer
2019	The Kingmaker	executive producer
2020	Persuasion Machine	executive producer
2020	Aggie	executive producer
2020	Us Kids	executive producer
2020	On the Record	executive producer
2020	Spaceship Earth	executive producer
2020	Assassins	executive producer
2020	Giving Voice	executive producer
2020	The Truffle Hunters	executive producer
2020	Jacinta	executive producer
2020	#Unfit: The Psychology of Donald Trump	co-executive producer
2020	Love & Stuff	executive producer
2020	Belly of the Beast	executive producer
2020	The Genetics of Hope	executive producer
2020	76 Days	executive producer
2020	Driving While Black: Race, Space, and Mobility in America	executive producer
2020	Francesco	executive producer
2020	The Life Ahead	executive producer
2020	A Crime on the Bayou	executive producer
2020	Television Event	executive producer
2021	What Would Sophia Loren Do?	executive producer
2021	Bring Your Own Brigade	executive producer
2021	Rebel Hearts	co-executive producer
2021	Try Harder!	executive producer
2021	Cusp	co-executive producer
2021	Ailey	executive producer
2021	Dear Mr. Brody	executive producer
2021	When Claude Got Shot	executive producer
2021	Pray Away	co-executive producer
2021	Paper & Glue	executive producer
2021	Citizen Ashe	executive producer
2021	Procession	executive producer
2021	You Resemble Me	executive producer
2021	Dionne Warwick: Don't Make Me Over	executive producer
2022	32 Sounds	executive producer
2022	Mija	executive producer
2022	Aftershock	executive producer
2022	To the End	executive producer
2022	Still Working 9 to 5	executive producer
2022	The Return of Tanya Tucker: Featuring Brandi Carlile	executive producer
2022	Into the Weeds	executive producer
2022	Make People Better	executive producer
2022	My Name is Andrea	executive producer
2022	Of Medicine and Miracles	executive producer
2022	Desperate Souls, Dark City and the Legend of Midnight Cowboy	executive producer
2022	Merkel	executive producer
2022	Freedom on Fire: Ukraine's Fight for Freedom	executive producer
2022	The Grab	executive producer
2022	What Comes Around	executive producer
2023	Beyond Utopia	co-executive producer
2023	Going Varsity in Mariachi	executive producer
2023	Food and Country	executive producer
2023	The Right to Read	executive producer
2023	Another Body	executive producer
2023	Of Night and Light: The Story of Iboga and Ibogaine	executive producer
2023	Hollywoodgate	co-executive producer
2023	Gonzo Girl	executive producer
2023	Defiant	executive producer
2023	Invisible Nation	executive producer
2024	Gaucho Gaucho	executive producer
2024	Sugarcane	executive producer
2024	Union	executive producer
2024	Admissions Granted	executive producer
2024	Billy Preston: That's The Way God Planned It	executive producer
2024	Songs from the Hole	executive producer
2024	A King Like Me	executive producer
2024	Fly	executive producer
2024	Love to the Max	executive producer
2024	The Bitter Pill	executive producer
2024	Antidote	executive producer
2024	Searching for Amani	executive producer
2024	The Pool	executive producer
2024	Paint Me a Road Out of Here	executive producer
2024	Satisfied	executive producer
2024	Mrs. Robinson	executive producer
2024	Mistress Dispeller	executive producer
2024	Viktor	executive producer
2024	A Man with Sole: The Impact of Kenneth Cole	executive producer
2024	The Inn Between	executive producer
2024	All God's Children	executive producer
2024	A Shot at History	executive producer
2024	Mothers of Chibok	executive producer
2025	Marlee Matlin: Not Alone Anymore	executive producer
2025	The Librarians	executive producer
2025	All That's Left of You	executive producer
2025	Move Ya Body: The Birth of House	executive producer
2025	How to Build a Library	executive producer
2025	Baby Doe	executive producer
2025	Facing War	executive producer
2025	Arrest the Midwife	executive producer
2025	We Are Pat	executive producer
2025	The Cycle of Lover	executive producer
2025	This Is Not A Drill	executive producer
2025	Ask E. Jean	executive producer
2025	The Bend in the River	executive producer
2025	All the Empty Rooms	executive producer
2025	The Voice of Hind Rajab	executive producer
2025	Remake	executive producer
2025	The Wilderness	executive producer
2026	The Lake	executive producer
2026	Soul Patrol	executive producer
2026	Cookie Queens	executive producer
2026	A Mosquito in the Ear	executive producer
2026	Just Look Up	executive producer
2026	My NDA	executive producer
2026	Daughters of the Forest	executive producer

=== Television ===
Year	Title	Notes
2004-2020	Independent Lens	8 episodes; executive producer
2020-2022	The Vow	executive producer
2021	Allen v. Farrow	executive producer
2021	Nuclear Family	executive producer
2022	Phoenix Rising	executive producer
2022	The Lincoln Project	executive producer
2024	Dante: Inferno to Paradise	executive producer
2026	The Man Will Burn	executive producer
2026	How to Change the World	executive producer
2026	New York: A Documentary Film	executive producer; 2 episodes

== See also ==
- List of Academy Award records
