= Treeless Mountain =

- Theatrical release poster
- Directed by: So Yong Kim
- Written by: So Yong Kim
- Produced by: Bradley Rust Gray; Jay Van Hoy; Lars Knudsen; Ben Howe; So Yong Kim
- Starring: Hee Yeon Kim; Song Hee Kim; Soo Ah Lee; Mi Hyang Kim; Boon Tak Park
- Cinematography: Anne Misawa
- Edited by: So Yong Kim; Bradley Rust Gray
- Music by: Eric Offin
- Distributed by: With Cinema
- Release dates: 5 September 2008 (TIFF); 27 August 2009 (South Korea)
- Running time: 89 minutes
- Country: South Korea
- Language: Korean
- Box office: $124,023

Treeless Mountain (Korean: 나무없는 산; RR: Namueomneun san) is a 2008 South Korean drama film written and directed by So Yong Kim. It stars Hee Yeon Kim, Song Hee Kim, Soo Ah Lee, Mi Hyang Kim, and Boon Tak Park. The film premiered on September 5, 2008, at the 2008 Toronto International Film Festival and was given a limited release in the United States on April 22, 2009.

== Plot ==
Jin is a bright young girl who lives with her mother and younger sister, Bin. She does well in school but is sometimes distracted from her family duties and occasionally wets the bed. One day she comes home to discover people removing the furniture from the family apartment. Her mother takes her and Bin to stay with "Big Aunt", their paternal aunt, who lives outside the city. The girls' mother leaves them a piggy bank and tells them that their aunt will give them change for their good behavior, and when it is full she will come back.

Jin is deeply hurt by the disappearance of her mother, crying frequently and often not eating, while younger sister Bin seems to be less affected by her absence. Bin befriends a neighborhood boy with Down syndrome whose kind mother gives them treats and seems somewhat concerned for them. It is quickly made apparent that Big Aunt is an alcoholic and doesn't really want the responsibility of the children. She often passes out or is too hung over to cook, forcing the girls to take care of themselves. When another neighborhood boy gives Bin roasted grasshoppers, the girls get the idea to cook their own as a means of making money to fill up their piggy bank. Although this is at first profitable, as summer wanes so do the grasshoppers. Bin gets the idea to make change from their greater-valued coins, which quickly fills up the bank. They try to call their mother on a young man's cell phone but discover the number is out of service. Nevertheless, they wait for their mother at the bus stop where they last saw her, but she never appears.

Big Aunt reveals that she received a letter from their mother, who reveals she has not had much luck with their father and that, in any case, she is unable to support the children. She suggests to Big Aunt that they go stay with at their maternal grandparents' farm. When they arrive, the girls' grandfather is very angry that Big Aunt is burdening them with the children. Their grandmother, on the other hand, immediately welcomes them and they become immersed in their aging grandparents' humble but busy lives. The girls ask their grandmother if she will buy them winter shoes, and then realize that her own shoes are falling apart. They decide to give her their piggy bank so that she can buy new shoes for herself. Although both girls lost faith in their mother after her non-appearance, Jin and Bin pinky swear that their mother will come back for them.

== Cast ==
- Hee Yeon Kim as Jin, a seven-year-old who is forced to take care of her younger sister when their mother leaves them.
- Song Hee Kim as Bin, the younger sister of Jin.
- Soo Ah Lee as Mom. While only briefly appearing on screen, her return is eagerly anticipated by the two main characters, Jin and Bin.
- Mi Hyang Kim as Big Aunt, who is left to take care of the two young girls. She is an alcoholic and has little interest in caring for them.
- Boon Tak Park as Grandma, who takes over the care of Jin and Bin after Big Aunt can't take care of them any longer. She teaches the girls about the importance of inner strength and family bonds.

== Production ==
So Yong Kim wrote the script for Treeless Mountain back in 2003, as a short story for a creative-writing class. Prior to filming, the director viewed and reviewed works about children by such creators as Jacques Doillon's Ponette, Hirokazu Kore-eda's Nobody Knows, and Yasujiro Ozu's I Was Born, But....

== Reception ==
Treeless Mountain has received generally positive reviews. It has an 85% "fresh" rating on Rotten Tomatoes based on 53 reviews. The site's critics consensus reads, "Intermittently wondrous and harsh, this sensitive drama about two abandoned sisters gives time and space to the intimate and beautiful moments of childhood."

Overseas reaction was positive, particularly in the UK. Ben Machell of The Times wrote the film is "A touching, gentle examination of the giddy rush and sickening sense of dislocation that comes with being left on your own when you're young". Sukhdev Sandhu The Daily Telegraph said that "Treeless Mountain is a work of diaphanous and fugitive beauty", while Peter Bradshaw of The Guardian wrote that the film is "[n]ot an easy watch, but worth sticking with".

The film received more mixed reviews in the United States. The Los Angeles Times criticized the film for "lack[ing] the freshness and surprise of In Between Days", while Ty Burr of The Boston Globe wrote "Treeless Mountain casts a sad, pellucid spell. It looks at life from three feet off the ground and meets the hardening gaze of its 6-year-old protagonist head on". According to Manohla Dargis of The New York Times, "Treeless Mountain has the tang of real life, though this is realism that has been filtered through 60 or so years of world art cinema".

In positive reviews, J. Hoberman of The Village Voice called the film "Skillfully unsentimental" while Nick Schager of Slant Magazine said it has "[a] tremendous poise and poignancy". G. Allen Johnson of the Houston Chronicle also praised the director, calling her film "another minimalist masterpiece". In contrast, The Austin Chronicle's Marjorie Baumgarten said, "The problem with this American indie filmed in Korea is that, despite the captivating faces and sad predicament of these little girls, nothing much happens". Jeff Vice of Deseret News similarly felt the film was "dull".

== Awards and nominations ==
Treeless Mountain won the Prize of the Ecumenical Jury at the 2009 Berlin International Film Festival in the Forum category. It also won Muhr Award at the 2008 Dubai International Film Festival for Best Film, as well as the Netpac Award at the 2008 Pusan International Film Festival. Treeless Mountain won the Gold Prize at the 2009 Damascus International Film Festival. At the 2008 Independent Spirit Awards, it was nominated for a Producers Award. At the 2009 Independent Spirit Awards, the film also received nominations for both Best Cinematography and the John Cassavetes Award.

== Bibliography ==
- Koehler, Robert (2008-09-04). "Treeless Mountain". Variety.
- Rainer, Peter (2009-05-08). "Review: 'Treeless Mountain'". The Christian Science Monitor.
- Murray, Noel (2009-04-23). "Treeless Mountain". The A.V. Club. The Onion.
- Kerr, Elizabeth; Associated Press (2008-10-05). "Treeless Mountain — Film Review". The Hollywood Reporter.
