= For Ellen =

- Directed by: So Yong Kim
- Written by: So Yong Kim
- Produced by: So Yong Kim; Paul Dano; Jen Gatien; Bradley Rust Gray
- Starring: Paul Dano; Jon Heder; Shaylena Mandigo
- Cinematography: Reed Morano
- Edited by: Bradley Rust Gray; So Yong Kim
- Music by: Jóhann Jóhannsson
- Distributed by: Tribeca Film
- Release dates: January 21, 2012 (Sundance Film Festival); September 5, 2012 (United States)
- Running time: 93 minutes
- Country: United States
- Language: English
- Box office: $20,746

For Ellen is a 2012 American drama film written, produced and directed by So Yong Kim. It stars Paul Dano, who also served as an executive producer. It is Kim's first English-language film.

== Plot ==
Joby Taylor is a struggling rock musician who is traveling to a small town to divorce his estranged wife. In the process, he grapples with the possibility of losing custody of his daughter Ellen, as well as the realities of his foundering music career and being a father.

== Cast ==
- Paul Dano as Joby Taylor
- Jon Heder as Fred Butler
- Shaylena Mandigo as Ellen Taylor
- Jena Malone as Susan
- Margarita Levieva as Claire Taylor
- Dakota Johnson as Cindy Taylor
- Alex Mauriello as Lisa

== Production ==
So Yong Kim called the film her "most personal" up to that date, saying “When I wrote the film, I was filled with doubts about my ability as a filmmaker, a loving partner and a decent mother to our daughter. I took all these emotions and tried to investigate what they meant to me. Making this film was something of a therapy, yet also a torture because it was inspired by a distant memory of my estranged father visiting me and my siblings for one day."

Kim, who wanted to do something different compared to her first two films, which center on young girls, initially wrote the script centered on an Asian man in his sixties. Paul Dano, a friend of Kim's, read the script and decided he wanted to play the lead character. Kim said not much was changed from the original script and the filmmakers worked with what they already had written.

The film was shot in 18 days in Massena, New York.

== Reception ==
=== Release ===
The film premiered at the Sundance Film Festival on January 21, 2012, before being shown at the Berlin International Film Festival on February 12, 2012. It was released in the United States for a limited theatrically run on September 5, 2012 and nationwide through VOD on September 19, 2012.

=== Critical reception ===
On review aggregator Rotten Tomatoes, the film holds an approval rating of 67% based on 36 reviews, with an average rating of 6.2/10. On Metacritic, the film has a weighted average score of 61 out of 100, based on 15 critics, indicating "generally favorable" reviews.

Acclaim was given to Paul Dano's performance in particular. Writing for The Guardian, Andrew Pulver called Dano's turn as a rocker "self-obsessed and heartbreakingly vulnerable all at the same time." He concluded, "Director So Yong Kim tells this story with flashes of sly humour, as well as a keen eye for the wintry landscapes; and her low-key, detached camera style makes for a beautifully unforced naturalism. Jon Heder, unrecognisable from Napoleon Dynamite, is good as Taylor's sensible lawyer – but this is Dano's film, and he gives it his all." Roger Ebert of the Chicago Sun-Times, who gave the film three and a half out of four stars, praised Dano's acting, and wrote, "This performance, unlike anything Paul Dano has ever done, must have required some courage".

Alison Willmore of The A.V. Club wrote while the film is "built around a strong turn by Dano", it is "sometimes at odds with the naturalism the film aims for with its grubby settings, loose camerawork, and tendency toward inquisitive close-ups." Ty Burr of The Boston Globe said the film "tries one's patience", citing the film's open-endedness and commenting there's "no weight to [Joby's] fury," but praised the father-daughter scenes and said, "What works, works for keeps."
