= Cold Comes the Night =

- Directed by: Tze Chun
- Written by: Tze Chun; Oz Perkins; Nick Simon
- Produced by: Mynette Louie; Trevor Sagan
- Starring: Alice Eve; Logan Marshall-Green; Bryan Cranston
- Cinematography: Noah Rosenthal
- Edited by: Paul Frank
- Music by: Jeff Grace
- Production companies: Syncopated Films; Sasquatch Films; Three Point Capital; Whitewater Films; Venture Forth
- Distributed by: Stage 6 Films; Samuel Goldwyn Films
- Release dates: September 20, 2013 (United Kingdom); January 10, 2014 (United States)
- Running time: 90 minutes
- Country: United States
- Language: English

Cold Comes the Night is a 2013 American crime thriller film directed by Tze Chun, who co-wrote the script with Oz Perkins and Nick Simon. It was released on September 20, 2013, in the UK and on January 10, 2014 in the United States. The film stars Alice Eve, Bryan Cranston and Logan Marshall-Green. The film was produced by Mynette Louie and Trevor Sagan.

== Plot ==
Chloe, a single mother living with her daughter Sophia, operates a motel. Topo is a blind man traveling cross country in a Jeep with his associate Quincy. They stop by Chloe's motel, when Quincy hires prostitute Gwen, and convinces Topo to stay the night. When Gwen is entertaining Quincy, an argument has Quincy fatally shooting Gwen, waking Chloe up. Chloe investigating finds Gwen and Quincy dead.

The police arriving, Chloe has a conversation with her police friend Billy who was Gwen's pimp. He tries to play down what has happened but Chloe tells him she will not allow his girls to use the rooms in her motel anymore, as a social worker was around earlier threatening to take Sophia away. The following day Topo takes Chloe and Sophia hostage looking for the Jeep. As Sophia watches TV Chloe agrees to retrieve the Jeep from the police. Topo forces Chloe and Sophia to stake out Billy's residence. Billy's wife Amber answers the door and Chloe and Billy fight. Billy refuses to give Chloe the Jeep. Topo forces Chloe to break into the police junkyard and retrieve a package hidden behind the radio. However, Chloe finds the space behind the radio empty.

Back at the motel, Chloe learns more about Topo and figures out that he is a courier who is supposed to deliver bundles of money. She proposes to Topo that they split the money if she helps him recover it and he reluctantly agrees due to his impairment. After Chloe falls asleep with Sophia, Topo looks around and finds Chloe's hidden stash of emergency money.

The next morning, Topo and Chloe stake out, learning that Quincy was Topo's nephew and Chloe's husband died in a hit and run. After finding Billy, Chloe follows him only to be found out and cornered in an alley. After Billy has Chloe pinned on the roof of the car, Topo sneaks up behind him and interrogates him and heads to Billy's house thinking the money is stashed there. After Chloe finds the money under the bed she is confronted by Amber, whom Topo shoots. They leave after tying Billy to the radiator. They go back to the motel where Topo leaves with all of the money with another associate, Donnie.

Chloe calls the police and tells them that she was a hostage. They tell her that Billy was not found at his house and decide to leave a squad-car there for her safety. Topo and Donnie meet Québécois mafia, Jacques and his associates in a car park. The mafia force Topo into the car and proceed to count the money to find that Topo is missing fifty grand, which Chloe has as her cut. When Jacques threatens to kill Topo, Topo kills them all.

Back at the motel, Chloe is packing her and Sophia's things when Topo shows to give her back her cut. However, Billy reappears out of nowhere and shoots Topo and Donnie. When Billy is strangling Chloe, she manages to push him off and he crashes through a glass door, fatally slicing his neck.

Chloe sets the scene to look like a deal gone bad, and takes Sophia into a taxi to parts unknown.

== Cast ==
- Alice Eve as Chloe
- Bryan Cranston as "Topo" Topolewski
- Logan Marshall-Green as Billy
- Ursula Parker as Sophia
- Leo Fitzpatrick as Donnie
- Erin Cummings as Amber
- Robin Lord Taylor as Quincy
- Sarah Sokolovic as Gwen
- Marceline Hugot as Denise
- Stephen Sheffer as Jacques
- Robert Prescott as Detective McKenney
- Ashlie Atkinson as Social Worker
- Dylan Chalfy as Police Officer

== Production ==
The film was shot over 22 days in October and November 2012 in Windham, Cairo, and East Durham in Greene County, upstate New York. Formerly known as Eye of Winter and Cold Quarter, the film is the second feature collaboration between director Tze Chun and producer Mynette Louie; their previous film, Children of Invention, premiered at Sundance in 2009. Voice actress and occasional editor Sarah Natochenny worked as an assistant editor on the film.

== Release ==
On July 25, 2013, it was announced that Sony Pictures Worldwide Acquisitions acquired worldwide rights to the film. The first trailer was released on July 24, 2013. The film had its theatrical premiere in the UK on September 20, 2013, followed by a US premiere on January 10, 2014.

== Reception ==
On Rotten Tomatoes, the film gathered a 43% approval rating based on 42 reviews, with an average rating of 4.9/10. The website's critics' consensus reads, "Despite strong performances from Bryan Cranston and Alice Eve, Cold Comes the Night is undone by a series of illogical plot twists." It has a score of 37 out of 100 on Metacritic based on 18 critics, indicating "generally unfavorable" reviews.
