= Patricia Benoit (director) =

Haitian-American filmmaker

- Born: Port-au-Prince, Haiti
- Occupation: Filmmaker
- Years active: 1997-present
- Known for: Stones in the Sun

Patricia Benoit is a Haiti-born American filmmaker. In 2012, she was critically acclaimed for her directorial venture on Stones in the Sun which was later screened at the 2012 Tribeca Film Festival where she won "Best New Narrative Director".

== Biography ==
Patricia Benoit was born in Haiti. Her family was forced into exile under the Duvalier dictatorship; they moved to France first before moving to the United States. Benoit grew up in Queens, New York.

== Career ==
In the 1990s, she became a filmmaker in New York. She worked with fellow Haitian-American Edwidge Danticat, as well as with Jonathan Demme, on projects on Haitian art and documentaries about Haïti.

Benoit directed a short film titled Fern's Heart of Darkness which appeared as one of the ten such short stories combined to produce a television film Subway Stories in 1997. Her documentary film titled Courage and Pain, about the victims of political torture in Haiti, was shown at the Walter Reade Theatre in Newcastle York in 1996. She also directed an award-winning documentary titled Tonbe/Leve which depicts the struggle for democracy in Haiti after the end of Duvalier's 30-year rule.

She rose to prominence as a film director where she was critically acclaimed for her directorial venture of Stones in the Sun, a film she also wrote, based on the lives of Haitian people. It was released in 2012, accumulating positive reviews.

The film Stones in the Sun received the best narrative feature film award at the Los Angeles Pan American Film Festival and also received the Africa Movie Academy Award for Best Diaspora Feature in 2013. At the Tribeca Film Festival, Patricia Benoit herself also received the special award for best debut narrative director.

Her short story "The Red Dress" was published in Edwidge Danticat's 2003 anthology The Butterfly's Way, subtitled Voices from the Haitian Dyaspora in the United States.
