= Subway Stories =

Film set on the New York subway

- Music by: Mecca Bodega
- Country of origin: United States
- Original language: English

Production
- Producers: Richard Guay; Valerie Thomas
- Running time: 80 minutes
- Production company: HBO NYC Productions

Original release
- Network: HBO
- Release: August 17, 1997

Subway Stories: Tales from the Underground is a film made in 1997 and produced by Home Box Office for television. It began as a contest among New Yorkers who submitted stories about their experiences within the New York City Subway. HBO picked ten of the stories and cast mostly well-known or accomplished actors (such as Denis Leary, Bonnie Hunt, Rosie Perez and Bill Irwin), and ten well-respected directors (such as Jonathan Demme, Ted Demme, Abel Ferrara, Craig McKay, Julie Dash, and Bob Balaban).

== Plot ==
Subway Stories is divided according to director into short films, each with their own title, but strung almost seamlessly together.

- "Subway Car From Hell"
  - Directed by Jonathan Demme, written by Adam Brooks
    - A man (Bill Irwin) tries to grab a bite to eat and get on a train during rush hour. He is unable to squeeze into packed cars. Spotting an empty car, he happily jumps in only to find that it's empty because of a bag left on a seat that is emitting a noxious vapor. He's trapped when the doors close before he can leave. Concluded in the final short.
- "The Red Shoes"
  - Directed by Craig McKay, written by John Guare
    - Starring Christine Lahti, Denis Leary, Kevin Corrigan, and N'Bushe Wright. An angry panhandler in a wheelchair enrages a woman by accidentally, then intentionally running over her red shoes while apathetic passengers watch. When she grabs his money and leaves, another woman turns passengers' opinions against him by claiming the two are working as a team to solicit sympathy and donations for him. Another bystander later confronts the second woman, who admits she was lying, but opinion turns against him as well.
- "The 5:24"
  - Directed by Bob Balaban, written by Lynn Grossman
    - Starring Steve Zahn and Jerry Stiller, this short follows the conversations between a wary young financial analyst and a seemingly brilliant, wise, older, and allegedly retired analyst who claims working in an office, though lucrative, would take the fun out his predictive abilities. When the older man proposes an investment that appears too good to be true, will the young analyst set aside his fears and gamble his savings on the older man's lucrative proposal?
- "Fern's Heart of Darkness"
  - Directed by Patricia Benoit, written by Angela Todd, and based on a story by Kathryn Drury
    - Fern (Bonnie Hunt) takes the subway to a friend's home on her first trip to the city, but her overconfidence, unfamiliarity with the system and fears and stereotypes about big city people leads her to become stuck in a locked turnstile in a station that's closed for the weekend. Non-speaking appearance by Mekhi Phifer.
- "The Listeners"
  - Directed by Seth Rosenfeld, written by Ken Kelsch
    - Starring Michael Rapaport and Lili Taylor, this short examines the age-old problem of communication in relationships when Belinda accuses her boyfriend of not listening to her. Her angry shift of location to another car, and brief conversation about politics with a suited older man, who seems at first to just be friendly, reveals that in the city, listening, hearing, and understanding are far more complicated, communal activities than one might have thought.
- "Underground"
  - Directed by Lucas Platt, written by Albert Innaurato
    - Starring Mercedes Ruehl as a sensual older woman with unusual appetites, this short asks and answers the question: what does a young man (Zachary Taylor) dumped by his girlfriend and beat up by her ex-boyfriend (Peter Sarsgaard) and his friends need to soothe his bruised face and ego?
- "Honey-Getter"
  - Directed by Alison Maclean, written by Danny Hoch
    - Nicole Ari Parker and Sarita Choudhury star in this short as Sharon and Humera, attractive law students heading home after a late night out. Tired and boarding the train alone, although it is far from empty, Humera is groped by an offensive young man (Ajay Naidu). His friend (Danny Hoch) chastises him after they run away but when she spots the pair on the platform, she exacts violent revenge on both, resulting in all three of them being arrested.
- "Sax Cantor Riff"
  - Written and directed by Julie Dash
    - Starring Taral Hicks, and with a brief appearance by Sam Rockwell, this short celebrates the unexpected musical gifts which the subway can give. In overlapping duets between a saxophone player (Kenny Garrett), accompanying first a gospel singer, and then a Jewish singer, one finds the subway to be an underground Carnegie Hall - whether the music is born of the grief wrought by experiencing the death of a parent in public, or produced by the heart-rending lament of a Hasidic man's (Dan Rous) unexpected emotional outpouring.
- "Love on the A Train"
  - Directed by Abel Ferrara, written by Marla Hanson
    - Starring Rosie Perez and Gretchen Mol, this humorous short follows a newly married man (Michael McGlone) who develops an utterly silent, distracting, sensual relationship with an attractive woman (Perez) on the subway. Although they never speak, they spend their morning commute lightly rubbing against each other, while appearing to only lean against a pole. He breaks his silence one day and she walks away in disgust. They eventually resume their wordless relationship.
- "Manhattan Miracle"
  - Directed by Ted Demme, written by Joe Viola
    - Gregory Hines as a man watching with growing concern and fear as a distressed pregnant woman (Anne Heche) across the tracks from him seems to consider jumping onto the tracks. Soundtrack of Vivaldi's Concerto for Cello in D Minor provides atmosphere.
- "Subway Car From Hell" (part 2)
  - The man from the first segment arrives at his destination, adjacent to the 42nd Street Shuttle. He removes a didgeridoo from a case and begins performing with his fellow buskers.

== Commercial releases ==
HBO initially released the movie on VHS and Laserdisc in the United States. It was later released on Region 4 DVD (Australasia, and Central and South America). A Region 1 DVD (North America) was released on October 16, 2007.

== See also ==
- Tube Tales - two years later, BSkyB made a London equivalent.
- Paris, I Love You - an assemblage of short films, each by different directors, all set in Paris, France.
- New York, I Love You - a collection of short films by different directors set in New York City.
