= Adriana Paz =

Mexican actress and dancer

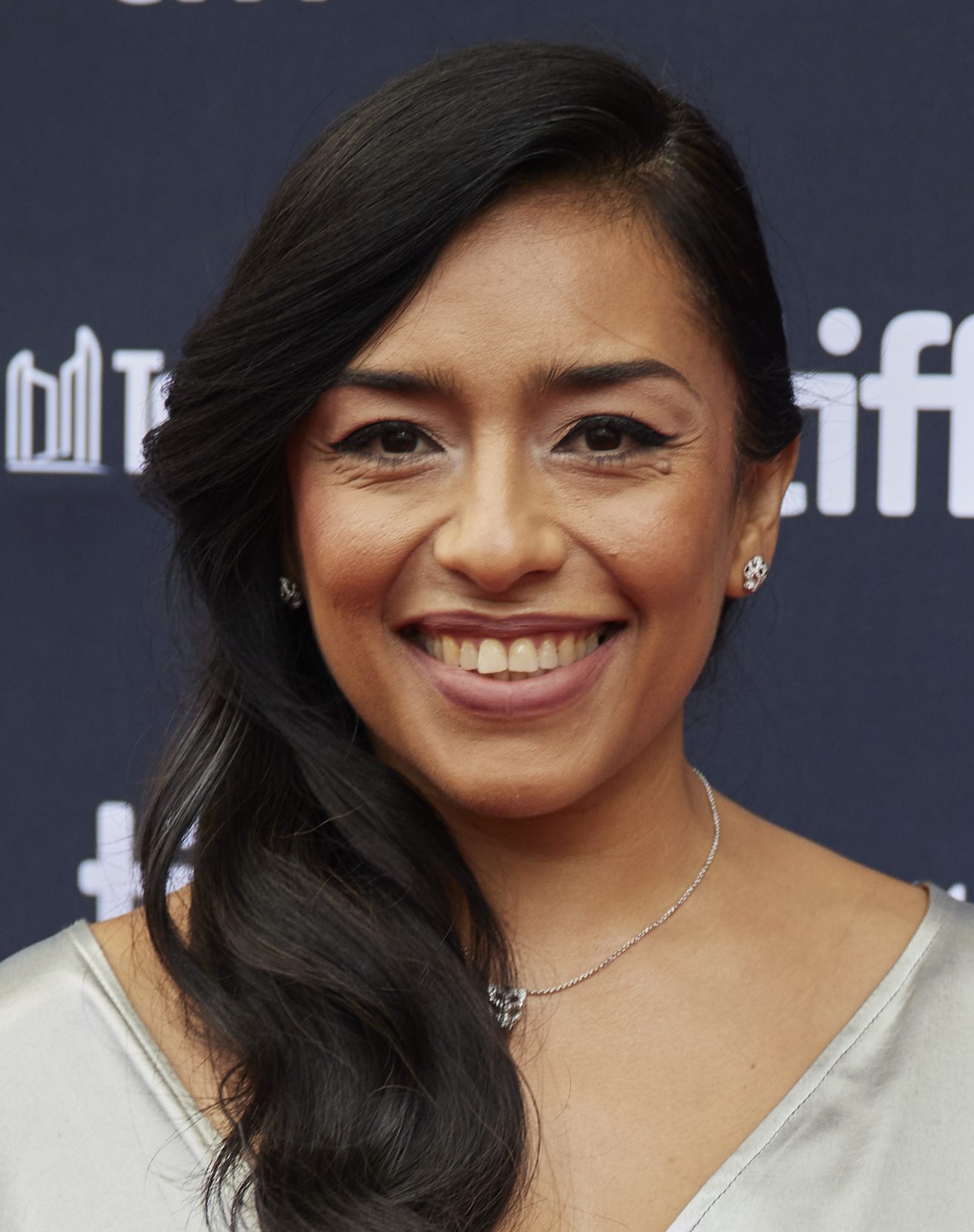
- Adriana Paz at the 2024 Toronto International Film Festival
- Born: January 13, 1980 (age 46); Mexico City, Mexico
- Education: National Autonomous University of Mexico
- Occupations: Actress; dancer
- Years active: 2003–present
- Children: 1

Adriana Paz (born January 13, 1980) is a Mexican actress and dancer. She began her artistic career in Spain, shooting commercials and acting in a play. She was recognized for her role as Toña in the Mexican film Rudo y Cursi (2009) with a nomination for the Ariel Award for Best Supporting Actress. She garnered critical praise starring as Miranda in Las Horas Muertas (2013), for which she was awarded Best Actress at the Morelia International Film Festival. She subsequently starred in the TV series Sucedió en Un Día (2010), Capadocia (2010), El Encanto del Aguila (2011), Dios, Inc. (2016), and Vis a vis (2018–2019).

Paz is also featured in other films, including Todos los Besos (2007), Backyard: El Traspatio (2009), Not Forgotten (2009), Un Mexicano Más (2009), El Mar Muerto (2010), 4 Maras (2012), Morelos (2012), Elysium (2013), Spectre, and Las Aparicio (2015). For her lead performance in the drama La Tirisia (2014), she received the Ariel Award for Best Actress and for the films Hilda (2015) and La Caridad (2016) she won two consecutive Ariel Awards for Best Supporting Actress. In 2017, her performance in El Autor earned her a nomination for the Goya Award for Best New Actress. For her role in the film Emilia Pérez, Paz was recognized with the Cannes Film Festival Award for Best Actress in 2024.

== Background ==
Adriana Paz was born in Mexico City in 1980. She wanted to study dramatic literature and theater, but was accepted at the School of Philosophy and Letters of the National Autonomous University of Mexico. Upon graduation, Paz relocated to Spain to join the Estudi Dansa Montserrat in Tarragona and the Estudis de Teatre in Barcelona. During her stay in Spain she had to support herself working in a flea market, a kindergarten, and as a tourist guide. Paz also shot two commercials, acted in a play, and toured as a dancer. She took dance classes, attended theater workshops, and learned to speak the Catalan language.

== Career ==
=== 2003–2009: Film debut in Todos los Besos and Rudo y Cursi ===
Paz joined the cast of the play Callejón de Lis, written by Joseph Danan and directed by Jean-Frédéric Chevallier, which ran in 2003 at the La Capilla Theater. Her television debut was in the series Historias de Leyenda, broadcast by Canal Once. Her first film role was in Todos los Besos, an independent film directed by César Aliosha in 2008. That same year, Paz shared her head shots with actor Manuel Teil, who then invited her to the casting for a film. Later she was invited to the casting sessions for Carlos Cuarón's first feature film. At a callback meeting, Paz met Cuarón and Diego Luna, and the following day Teil told her that she had won the role of Toña, the wife of Beto "Rudo", the character played by Luna. The film, Rudo y Cursi (2009), starring Luna and Gael García Bernal, is about two soccer players who are half-brothers and become rivals when a talent scout discovers them and asks them to try out for a professional team. Reviewing the film, Pete Hammond of Backstage magazine, was critical of the film's female roles, explaining that "[Dolores] Heredia and Paz don't have a lot to do but are also fine in a generally top-notch cast". Paz received her first Ariel Award nomination for Best Supporting Actress for Rudo y Cursi. The following year, she was featured in the film Backyard: El Traspatio, directed by Carlos Carrera.

=== 2009–2012: El Mar Muerto, Un Mexicano Más and first leading role in Las Horas Muertas ===
Paz played a supporting role in the film El Mar Muerto directed by Ignacio Ortíz in 2009, starring Aída López, Joaquín Cosio, Leticia Gutiérrez, and Mario Almada. The film used the historic center of Mexico City as its main location, and the plot was about a murder that happens during a blackout. She later appeared in Un Mexicano Más (2010), directed by René Cardona III, based on the book of the same title written by Juan Sánchez Andraka. Of her role in the film, a prostitute named La Chiquis, Paz told TV Notas: "she [La Chiquis] works with Don Leodegario (Ernesto Gómez Cruz) at his restaurant bar and seeks to find a husband who will take her out of the village, but until that happens she is having a lot of fun with him, the male teachers, and all the men who pass through the village".

In 2010, Paz starred with Kristyan Ferrer in the film Las Horas Muertas, directed by Aarón Fernández; this was the first lead role for the actress. In the film, Sebastián (Ferrer) runs a motel and starts a relationship with a regular client named Miranda (Paz). Jay Weissberg of Variety stated that it was a "truly breakthrough role" for Paz, since she "enlivens the screen with palpable charm". Weissberg also said that "without the warmth and ironic self-awareness that Paz brings to Miranda, the pic might have been a lesser vehicle, or at least a less absorbing one". Las Horas Muertas was screened during the 2013 Morelia International Film Festival, where Paz was named Best Actress. She was unable to attend the festival as she was about to give birth to her son. About the award, the actress stated to El Sol de México: "I do not like to think about awards, it is better to make things for the pleasure of doing them and, if they arrive [accolades] are appreciated and enjoyed". In 2011, Paz also had a small role in Elysium directed by Neill Blomkamp starring Matt Damon, and was also featured in the film Morelos by Antonio Serrano, about the last days of José María Morelos' military career.

=== 2014: La Tirisia ===
Paz played Cheba, the lead role in La Tirisia, a film written, produced, and directed by Jorge Pérez Solano (2014). The plot, inspired by a popular term tirisia (which means "a perpetual sadness defined as 'the death of the spirit'"), is set in the Mixteca region of Mexico, and centers on two women (Paz and Gabriela Cartol) who were impregnated by Sylvestre (Gustavo Sánchez Parra). When Cheba's estranged husband returns to town, he finds her sunk into a deep depression since she had to give away her newborn (Sylvestre's child). About the film, Paz said to Diario de Xalapa: "It is a very well-written story that required characters with depth; when I read it, it brought me great joy and made me say 'I want to watch this'. The first time I watched it I was shocked; it left a lump in my throat. It is beautiful". The film was not exhibited in commercial movie theaters in Mexico because distribution was too expensive. Instead, La Tirisia was screened at film festivals such as the Chicago International Film Festival, Thessaloniki International Film Festival, and the Toulouse Latinoamerican Film Festival, and later had a month-and-a-half stretch at the Mexican art house Cineteca Nacional. Paz commented about it: "It is not very fair. We do not have the same resources that the big production companies have, and we don't have the same possibilities for making films. It is very difficult to produce a project and know that there is not a fair distribution and exhibition of these films".

Paz' performance was praised by Boyd van Hoeij of The Hollywood Reporter, who said she was "exceptional as a passionate woman who has needs and desires of her own but who's boxed in by society's rigid expectations for her gender". Jaime López Blanco of Sputnik magazine referred to her acting as "fascinating on that introspection of a mother dead inside, suffering the absence of one of their children". At the 57th Ariel Awards, Paz received the Best Actress award for her role in the film. Upon winning, Paz said: "it definitely forces me to not lower the quality of my work... the other part is the joy it generates in me, the support that I am getting from the Academy, because it gives me the chance to be known as a good actress. This award speaks for myself and my duty is to continue along that line and go for characters that challenge me more".

=== 2015–2016: Spectre and Hilda ===
In 2015, Paz told El Financiero of her wish to do a musical project, since she "loves to sing" and wanted to return to the stage. She appeared in the opening scene of the film Spectre, along with Mexican actors Tenoch Huerta Mejía, Stephanie Sigman, and British actor Daniel Craig in 2015. In the same year, Paz joined the cast of Hilda, Andrés Clariond's first feature film, which is based on a play written by French author Marie NDiaye. The film is about a housewife (Verónica Langer) who hires a maid (Paz) and, in the days that follow, develops an obsession with her, preventing her from leaving the house. Clariond cast Paz since he did not want very well known faces and he liked her "personality and strength".

In his review of the film, Luis Fernando Galván of En Filme described Hilda's character as "complex and beyond any cliché imposed by the Golden Age of Mexican cinema, where the poor is seen as decent, honest and kind, for example, Nosotros Los Pobres (1947) or the telenovelas, where the humble and pretty maid is rescued by prince charming from the clutches of her evil patron". Paz said of this role: "If you are a brunette actress with long hair, this is the kind of role that [the producers] usually give you, but fortunately this was very deep. It is difficult because Hilda does not speak, everything surges out of her energy and presence. She is not very funny or mouthy or a thief. Hilda is nothing like that. She is a woman who is making a household with her husband and is a very worthy woman who does not stoop, does not steal, and is not one of those stereotypes". At the Ariel Awards of 2016, the film received five nominations, with Paz winning for Best Supporting Actress. Filmed in 2013, Las Aparicio (a film adaptation of the TV series of the same name) was released in 2016, with Paz in a small role. It was met with mixed reviews but Paz was praised by Jesús Chavarría of Cine Premiere for her "brief and effective" performance.

=== 2016–present: Dios, Inc., Casi Una Gran Estafa, La Caridad, and El Autor ===
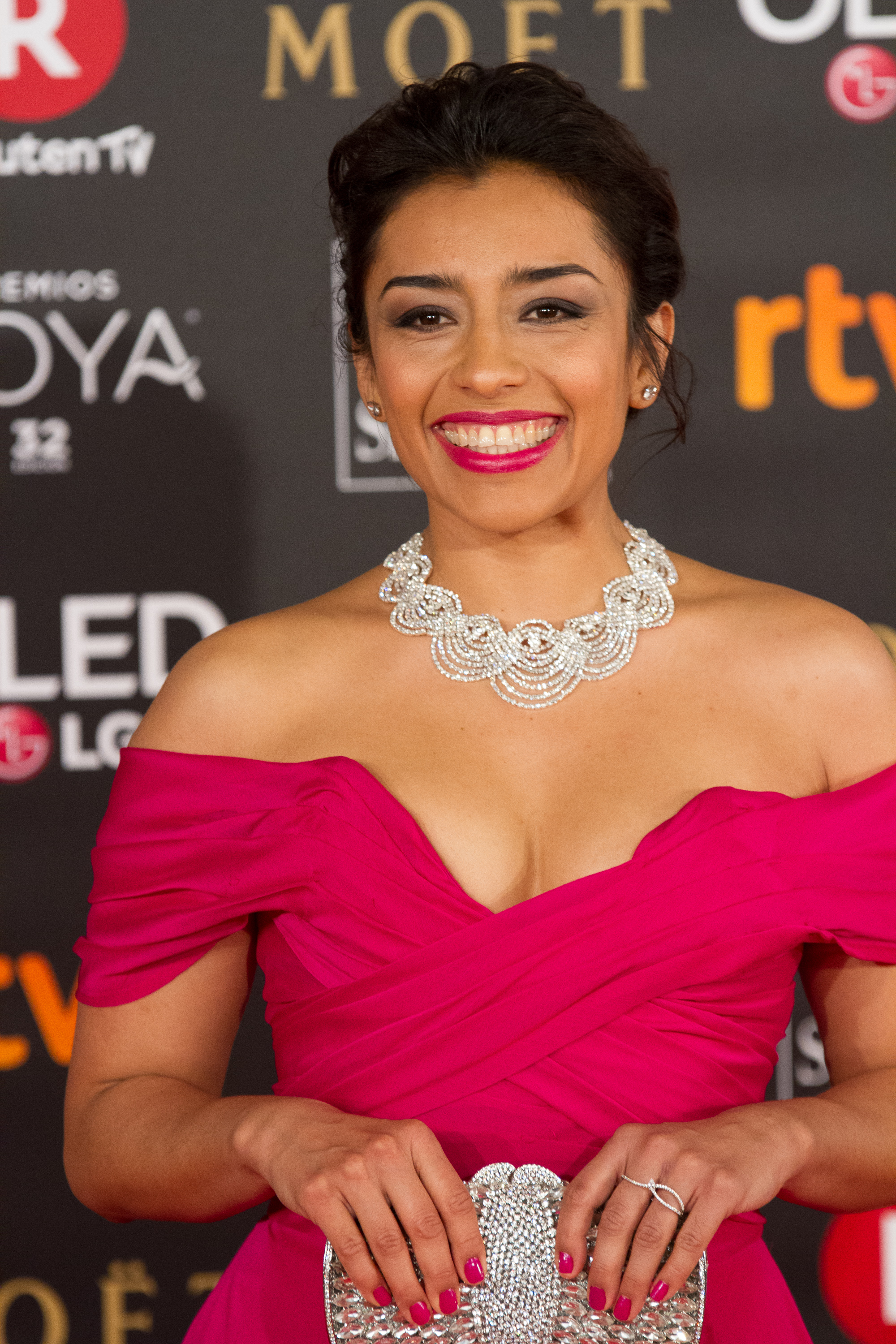
Paz in 2018

Paz had a guest starring role in the first season of the TV series Dios, Inc., created by Sergio Sánchez for HBO Latin America. The series featured performances by Rafael Sánchez Navarro, Luis Arrieta, Rocío Verdejo, Carlos Torres Torrija, Isabel Burr, Dagoberto Gama, Manuel Balbi, and Fernando Luján. Paz is featured in the 2016 comedy film Original y Copia, directed by Guillermo Barba, co-starring Christopher Uckermann, Zuria Vega, and Juan Pablo Medina. This is Paz' first comedy. Talking about this role she said: "It is a place where I had not stopped and that was far from easy, it was very complicated, because it is far from my comfort zone. It was complicated but fun, I would make another comedy again"; the film was released in Mexico in August 2017 as Casi Una Gran Estafa. Paz and Veronica Langer (her co-star in Hilda) re-united for the film La Caridad, directed by Marcelino Islas in 2016; Paz won the Best Supporting Actress award at the 59th Ariel Awards for the role of Eva in La Caridad. Paz and Tenoch Huerta filmed El Móvil (released as El Autor) in Spain, and they star as a couple being spied upon by a writer who uses them as inspiration for a novel. The film premiered in Mexico as part of the Morela International Film Festival in 2017 and for her performance, Paz received a nomination for a Goya Award for Best New Actress. The actress ended 2018 joining the third season of the Spanish TV drama series Vis a vis.

In 2018, Paz starred in Nadie Sabrá Nunca, the first feature film by Jesús Torres Torres. Set during the 70s, the drama is about a housewife dealing with machismo, "I think it is very interesting how Jesus [the film director] raises these issues. Women have suffered from machismo, but we are also those who perpetuate it. How it influences younger generations. At that time they had to go against all odds, they didn't even talk about that. I think it is important to identify the role that women have in it, because men also suffer from it, like Rigoberto [played by Jorge A. Jiménez], who has to fulfill that role," Paz said to Sector Cine magazine.

== Filmography ==
=== Film ===
Year	Title	Role	Notes	Ref.
2007	Todos los Besos	Carmen		
2008	Rudo y Cursi	Toña		
2009	Backyard: El Traspatio	Hilda		
2009	Not Forgotten	Pregnant maid		
2009	Un Mexicano Más	Chiquis		
2010	El Mar Muerto	Julia		
2012	4 Maras	La Guillo		
2012	Morelos	Simona		
2012	A World for Raúl	Raúl's mother	Student Academy Award winning short film.	
2013	Las Horas Muertas	Miranda		
2013	Elysium	—		
2014	La Tirisia	Cheba		
2014	Hilda	Hilda		
2015	Spectre	Mexican Woman in Lift		
2015	Las Aparicio	Adriana	Film adaptation of the TV series Las Aparicio	
2016	La Caridad	Eva		
2016	La Voz de Un Sueño	Susana		
2017	Casi Una Gran Estafa	Maripaz		
2017	Nadie Sabrá Nunca	Lucía		
2017	El Autor	Irene		
2018	La Boda de Valentina	Independent Candidate		
2019	Tijuana Bible	Ana		
2021	This Is Not a Comedy	Melissa		
2022	Chupa	Julia		
2023	Uno para morir	Teresa		
2024	Emilia Pérez	Epifanía		
2024	Arillo de hombre muerto	Dalia		
2026	The Huntress	Luz		
2026	A Mouthful of Ash	Isabel		
2026	Animals	Cecilia Trujillo		

=== Television ===
Year	Title	Role	Notes	Ref.
2010	Sucedio en Un Día	Teibolera	Segment — "La Historia del Hombre que Nunca fue Consalero"	
2010	Capadocia	Ramona	Season 2 Episode — "Bienaventurados los Inocentes"	
2011	El Encanto del Aguila	Natividad	Episode — "Los Martires de Puebla"	
2015	La rosa de Guadalupe	Mirna / Leonor	Season 8 Episode — "El Niño Chiquito"; Episode — "El Segundo Cielo"	
2016	Dios, Inc.	María Elena	4 episodes: "Crucifixión" "Las Catacumbas" "El Santo Grial" "La Grey"	
2018	Vis a vis	Altagracia		
2020	Perdida	Angelita		
2021	Coyote	Silvia Peña		
2022	La rebelión	Ivonne		
2023	El colapso	Soledad	Episode — "La Isla"	

=== Theatre ===
Year	Title	Role	Notes	Ref.
2003	Callejón de Lis	—	La Capilla	
2005	Los Tres Sueños de Rosaura	—	—	
2010	Zoot Suit	—	Las Vizcainas	

== Accolades ==
Year	Association	Category	Work	Result	Ref.
2009	Ariel Awards	Best Supporting Actress	Rudo y Cursi	Nominated	
2013	Morelia International Film Festival	Best Actress in a Feature Length Mexican Film	Las Horas Muertas	Won	
2015	Ariel Awards	Best Actress	La Tirisia	Won	
2016	Ariel Awards	Best Supporting Actress	Hilda	Won	
2016	Pantalla de Cristal Film Festival	Best Actress - Short Film	Luces Brillantes	Nominated	
2017	Ariel Awards	Best Supporting Actress	La Caridad	Won	
2017	CEC Awards	Best New Actress	El Autor	Nominated	
2017	Goya Awards	Best New Actress	El Autor	Nominated	
2024	Cannes Film Festival	Best Actress	Emilia Pérez	Won	
2024	Mill Valley Film Festival	Outstanding Ensemble Performance	Emilia Pérez	Won	
2025	Screen Actors Guild Awards	Outstanding Performance by a Cast in a Motion Picture	Emilia Pérez	Nominated	
2025	Ariel Awards	Best Actress	Arillo de hombre muerto	Nominated	
