= Robert Prescott (actor) =

American actor (born 1957)

Robert Prescott (born 1957) is an American actor who has appeared in film and on television. He is best known for his role as Kent in the 1985 hit comedy film Real Genius. He also starred in the 1984 comedy film Bachelor Party as Cole Whittier, and appeared in the 1987 Mel Brooks comedy Spaceballs in a cameo as the Sand Cruiser Driver.

He starred in the Father Dowling Mysteries TV movie Fatal Confession: A Father Dowling Mystery, and has made guest appearances on TV shows including Hill Street Blues, The Sopranos, Law & Order, Law & Order: Special Victims Unit and Quantum Leap

== Filmography ==
Year	Title	Role	Notes
1984	Bachelor Party	Cole Whittier	
1984	National Lampoon's Joy of Sex	Tom Pittman / Richard	
1985	Real Genius	Kent	
1986	Blue de Ville	Kevin	
1987	Spaceballs	Sand Cruiser Driver	
1987	Fatal Confessions: A Father Dowling Mystery	Lt. Phil Keegan	TV movie
1999	Earthly Possessions	Stu	TV movie
2000	A Man Is Mostly Water	Customer	
2006	The Good Shepherd	Bonesman MC 1961	
2007	Michael Clayton	Mr. Verne	
2008	Burn After Reading	Process Server	
2011	Gun Hill Road	Mr. Donovan	
2011	The Crisis of Being Dr. Adam Porter	Dr. Hanson	Short
2011	God Don't Make the Laws	Eddie Palmer	
2012	The Bourne Legacy	Air Force Officer	
2013	Cold Comes the Night	Detective	
2017	Roman J. Israel, Esq.	Hon. Adam W. Hilliard	
2018	Red Dead Redemption 2	Sheriff Hanley	Videogame
