= Lovesong (film) =

2016 film by So Yong Kim

- Theatrical release poster
- Directed by: So Yong Kim
- Written by: So Yong Kim; Bradley Rust Gray
- Produced by: Alex Lipschultz; Bradley Rust Gray; David Hanson; Johnny MacDonald
- Starring: Jena Malone; Riley Keough; Brooklyn Decker; Amy Seimetz; Marshall Chapman; Ryan Eggold; Rosanna Arquette
- Cinematography: Guy Godfree; Kat Westergaard
- Edited by: Bradley Rust Gray; So Yong Kim
- Music by: Jóhann Jóhannsson
- Production companies: Autumn Productions; Gamechanger Films; Monofonus Press
- Distributed by: Strand Releasing
- Release dates: January 24, 2016 (Sundance Film Festival); February 17, 2017 (United States)
- Running time: 84 minutes
- Country: United States
- Language: English
- Box office: $10,626

Lovesong is a 2016 American drama film directed by So Yong Kim, who co-wrote the film with Bradley Rust Gray. It stars Jena Malone, Riley Keough, Brooklyn Decker, Amy Seimetz, Marshall Chapman, Ryan Eggold, and Rosanna Arquette.

The film had its world premiere at the 2016 Sundance Film Festival on January 24, 2016. It was released on February 17, 2017, by Strand Releasing.

== Plot ==
Sarah is a stay-at-home mom whose husband frequently travels for work and is dismissive of Sarah's concerns about his absences. Overwhelmed by the isolation of taking care of her toddler daughter, Jessie, she calls her best friend Mindy, whom she has not seen in years, and the two depart on an impromptu roadtrip together with Jessie. The two women discuss their different lifestyles with Sarah believing that Mindy is free-spirited and promiscuous. After a night recalling their sexual experiences in college, the two end up kissing, which leads to them being physically intimate. The day after, Mindy is hurt after Sarah seems to treat the experience nonchalantly, thinking it happened due to the spark of the moment and Mindy's promiscuity. When they stop at a convenience store, Mindy purchases a ticket back to her home in New York City and abruptly leaves.

After three years of little contact, Mindy invites Sarah to her wedding. Sarah is now separated from her husband. Sarah at first feels left out and isolated as she is disconnected from Mindy and her life. However, after Mindy invites herself to Sarah's hotel room the two begin to reconnect. At Mindy's bachelorette party the two share a kiss.

The day of Mindy's wedding the two go for a walk and discuss their roadtrip, the night that they slept together, and the three years of absence. Mindy feels sorry for leaving, and they tell one another they love each other. Nevertheless, Mindy goes forward with her wedding.

== Cast ==
- Jena Malone as Mindy
- Riley Keough as Sarah
- Brooklyn Decker as Lilly
- Amy Seimetz as Chloe
- Marshall Chapman as Jessica
- Ryan Eggold as Leif
- Rosanna Arquette as Eleanor
- Cary Joji Fukunaga as Dean
- Sky Ok Gray as Jessie
  - Jessie Ok Gray as Jessie (age 3)

== Production ==
In December 2014, it was revealed that Jena Malone, Riley Keough, Brooklyn Decker, Amy Seimetz, Marshall Chapman, Ryan Eggold and Rosanna Arquette joined the cast of the film, with So Yong Kim directing from a screenplay she co-wrote with Bradley Rust Gray. Alex Lipschultz, David Hansen, and Johnny MacDonald will serve as producers on the film, while Mynette Louie, Laura Rister, Julie Parker Benello, Dan Cogan, Geralyn Dreyfous, and Wendy Ettinger would executive produce.

== Release ==
The film had its world premiere at the 2016 Sundance Film Festival on January 24, 2016. Shortly after, Strand Releasing acquired U.S. distribution rights. The film was released on February 17, 2017.

== Critical reception ==
Lovesong received positive reviews from film critics. It holds an 83% approval rating on review aggregator website Rotten Tomatoes, based on 30 reviews. The site's critics consensus reads, "Wise, well-acted, and emotionally resonant, Lovesong explores emotionally resonant themes through the ups and downs of the bond between two women." On Metacritic, the film has a weighted average score of 74 out of 100, based on 14 critics, indicating "generally favorable" reviews. According to the Guardian the movie received 3 stars out of 5.

== See also ==
- List of LGBT films directed by women
