= Stones in the Sun =

- Film poster
- Directed by: Patricia Benoit
- Written by: Patricia Benoit
- Produced by: Karin Chien; Ben Howe; Mynette Louie
- Starring: Edwidge Danticat; Michele Marcelin; Diana Masi; Thierry Saintine; Patricia Rhinvil; James Noel; Carlo Mitton
- Cinematography: Eric Lin
- Edited by: Dominique Petrot; John F. Lyons
- Music by: Enis Rotthoff
- Release date: April 22, 2012 (Tribeca Film Festival)
- Running time: 95 minutes
- Countries: United States; Haiti
- Languages: Haitian Creole, English, French

Stones in the Sun is a 2012 Haitian American film written and directed by Patricia Benoit and starring Edwidge Danticat, Michele Marcelin, Diana Masi, Thierry Saintine, Patricia Rhinvil, James Noel, and Carlo Mitton. It premiered at the 2012 Tribeca Film Festival, where it won the Special Jury Prize for Best Narrative Director.

== Plot ==
In the midst of increasing political violence, a young couple, two sisters, and a father and son are driven from Haiti to New York, where they must confront the truths of their interlocked past.

== Production ==
Principal photography took place over 21 days in New York City, 4 days in Jacmel, Haiti, and half a day at the Miami International Airport during the crew's layover between New York and Haiti.

== Awards ==
The film has won the following awards:

- Special Jury Prize for Best Narrative Director, 2012 Tribeca Film Festival
- Best Diaspora Feature, 9th Africa Movie Academy Awards
- Best Narrative Feature, 2013 Pan African Film Festival
- Jury Award for Best Feature, 2013 Teaneck International Film Festival

Previously, the script won the Sundance Time Warner Storytelling Award, the Sundance Annenberg Award, and a Jerome Foundation Grant.
