= So Yong Kim =

American independent filmmaker (born 1968)

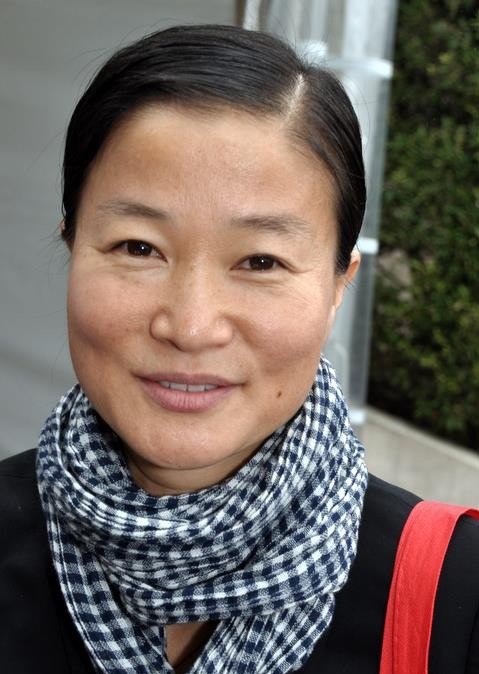
- So Yong Kim in 2012 at the Deauville American Film Festival.
- Born: So Yong Kim; 1968 (age 57–58); Busan, South Korea

Korean name
- Hangul: 김소영
- RR: Gim Soyeong
- MR: Kim Soyŏng

So Yong Kim (born 1968) is an American independent filmmaker. She has made four feature films: In Between Days, Treeless Mountain, For Ellen, and Lovesong. So Yong Kim is a recipient of the New York Foundation’s Video Artist Grant, Puffin Grant, MacDowell Colony Media Fellow for the National Endowment for the Arts and the Sleipnir Nordik Arts Travel Grant. She has exhibited her installations and films/videos in Austin, Chicago, New York, London, Marseilles, Reykjavik, Milwaukee, Gothenburg, Osnabruck, and Tokyo.

== Early life ==
She was born in Busan, South Korea, in 1968 and moved to Los Angeles, California to live with her mother at the age of 12. She studied painting, performance and video art at the Art Institute of Chicago, where she earned her MFA.

== Career ==
In 2003, Kim produced the award-winning Icelandic feature Salt, directed by her husband and creative partner Bradley Rust Gray.

In 2006, Kim was featured on the list of the «25 Filmmakers to Watch» in Filmmaker Magazine.

In 2007, Kim received the Special Jury Prize at the Sundance Film Festival for her debut feature In Between Days. Loosely inspired by her own youth, the film was shot in Toronto and mostly improvised by its teenage cast members, whose awkward, raw romance and alienation from their surroundings were expressed through intimate digital photography. The film was acclaimed by the critics and won the Special Jury Prize at the 2007 Sundance Festival, together with the FIPRESCI International Critics’ Prize in Berlin, the LA Critics’ Prize and Best Film and Best Actress Prizes in Buenos Aires.

Treeless Mountain in 2008 followed the same dramatic thread, and was based on a story of abandonment and two little girls’ capacity for recovery, in a film that Village Voice called «one of the best films about childhood ever made». The script was supported by the Atelier at Cannes, the Sundance Institute’s Writers and Directors Labs and the Pusan Promotion Plan. Treeless Mountain won the Adelaide Film Festival's Feature Fiction Award in 2009.

In 2009, So Yong Kim also took part in the omnibus film Chinatown Film Project.

Kim's film For Ellen, starring Paul Dano, premiered at the 2012 Sundance Film Festival.

In 2014, Kim released Spark and Light, a short film starring Riley Keough which was commissioned by fashion house Miu Miu as part of their ongoing series Women's Tales.

In 2016, Kim's film Lovesong premiered at the 2016 Sundance Film Festival. The film, about two best friends who fall in love, reunited her with Jena Malone (who appeared in For Ellen) and Riley Keough. Additionally, Kim's first foray into directing television began in 2016 with Queen Sugar, and she has since directed episodes of Transparent, American Crime, The Good Fight, Halt and Catch Fire, Vida, On Becoming a God in Central Florida, and Tales from the Loop. In 2016, Kim also directed the music video for Mitski's "A Burning Hill."

In 2021, she directed four episodes of the limited series, Dr. Death.

== Personal life ==
Kim is married to Bradley Rust Gray since 1999. The couple have two children.

== Filmography ==
| Year | Title | Director | Writer | Producer | Editor |
|---|---|---|---|---|---|
| 2006 | In Between Days | Yes | Yes | No | Yes |
| 2008 | Treeless Mountain | Yes | Yes | Yes | Yes |
| 2012 | For Ellen | Yes | Yes | Yes | Yes |
| 2016 | Lovesong | Yes | Yes | No | Yes |

Short film

| Year | Title | Director | Writer | Editor | Note |
|---|---|---|---|---|---|
| 2014 | Spark and Light | Yes | Yes | Yes | Segment of Women's Tales |
| 2019 | So Yong Kim | Yes | Yes | TBD | Segment of 30/30 Vision: 3 Decades of Strand Releasing |

Television

| Year | Title | Episode(s) |
|---|---|---|
| 2016 | Queen Sugar | "The Darker Sooner" |
| 2016 | Transparent | "Off the Grid" |
| 2017 | American Crime | "Season Three: Episode One" |
| 2017 | The Good Fight | "Not So Grand Jury" |
| 2017 | Halt and Catch Fire | "Nowhere Man" |
| 2017 | The Exorcist | "One for Sorrow" |
| 2017 | There's... Johnny! | "The Getaway" "The Anniversary Show" |
| 2017-2019 | Room 104 | "I Knew You Weren't Dead" "The Return" "Prank Call" |
| 2018 | Vida | "Episode 2" |
| 2018 | Get Shorty | "Banana Split" "Curtains" |
| 2018-2019 | Good Girls | "A View from the Top" "The Dubby" |
| 2019 | New Amsterdam | "A Seat at the Table" |
| 2019 | Divorce | "Bad Manners" |
| 2019 | On Becoming a God in Central Florida | "Birthday Party" |
| 2020 | Tales from the Loop | "Transpose" |
| 2020 | Grand Army | "Brooklyn, 2020" "See Me" |
| 2021 | Dr. Death | "The $?!& in the Bed" "Occam's Razor" "Feet of Clay" "Hardwood Floors" |
| 2022 | Roar | "The Woman Who Was Kept on a Shelf" "The Girl Who Loved Horses" |
| 2023 | Wilderness (Also executive producer) | "Happily Ever After" "The Other Woman" "Repent At Leisure" "Home Sweet Home" "Like Mother, Like Daughter" "Where White Knights Go To Die" |
| 2024 | Three Women | "Climax" "Her Name" |
| 2025 | You | "My Fair Maddie" |
| 2025 | We Were Liars | "Lying Together in a Silver Lining" "When Lies Gives You Lemons" |
| 2025 | Doc | "What I Did For Love" |

== See also ==
- List of female film and television directors
- List of LGBT-related films directed by women
