= Tze Chun =

American filmmaker and comic book publisher

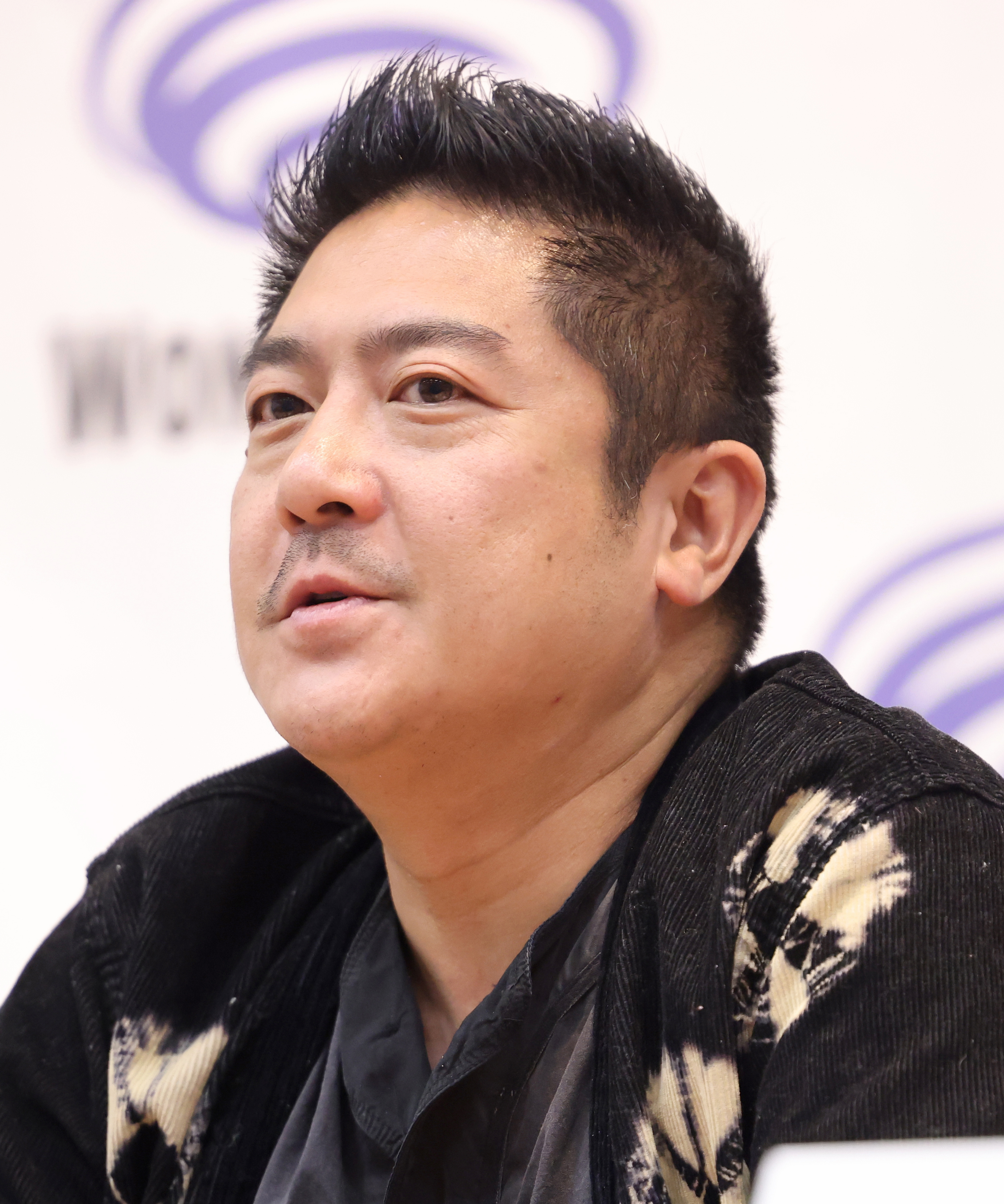
- Chun in 2025
- Born: Tze-ngo Chun; March 20, 1980 (age 46); Chicago, Illinois, U.S.
- Education: Columbia University (BA)
- Occupations: Film producer; film director; screenwriter; publisher
- Years active: 2005–present

Tze Chun
- Traditional Chinese: 陳子翱
- Simplified Chinese: 陈子翱
Transcriptions
Standard Mandarin
- Hanyu Pinyin: Chén Zǐáo
Yue: Cantonese
- Jyutping: can4 zi2 ngou4

Tze Chun (born Tze-ngo Chun Chinese: 陳子翱) is an American film and TV producer, director, writer, painter, and comic book publisher. He was born in Chicago and raised outside of Boston, and graduated from Milton Academy in 1998. He received his bachelor's degree in film studies at Columbia University.

== Films ==
=== Feature films ===
==== Children of Invention ====
His debut feature film, Children of Invention, premiered at the 2009 Sundance Film Festival, screened at over 50 film festivals, won 17 festival awards including eight Grand Jury or Best Narrative Feature prize including "Best Narrative Feature" at the Newport International Film Festival, the Independent Film Festival Boston, the Los Angeles Asian Pacific Film Festival (where the cast won a Special Jury Prize in New Talent to Watch in Acting), the San Diego Asian Film Festival, and the San Francisco Asian American Film Festival, as well as "Emerging Filmmaker Awards" from the Hawaii International Film Festival and the DC Asian Pacific American Film Festival. The film was also released theatrically in eight cities, on DVD, and on VOD in 2010.

The film was also praised by critics, with Manohla Dargis of The New York Times saying that the film was a "fine feature debut...while the politics are there, you might be too busy choking back tears to notice" and the Los Angeles Times also called it "wonderful...absorbing, deftly played", Variety called it "urgent, artful...austerely poetic" and USA Today's Claudia Puig said, "I loved this movie. I can't remember when I have loved a movie quite as much as this one."

==== Cold Comes the Night ====
In 2012, Chun wrapped principal photography on Cold Comes the Night (formerly "Eye of Winter"), which he co-wrote with Oz Perkins and Nick Simon. The film stars Bryan Cranston (Breaking Bad), Alice Eve (Star Trek Into Darkness), Logan Marshall-Green (Prometheus), Ursula Parker, and Leo Fitzpatrick. Frequent producer and collaborator Mynette Louie produced the film.

==== Sleeping Dogs ====
In October 2025, it was reported that Chun had completed a first draft of the screenplay for the live-action film adaptation of Sleeping Dogs.

=== Short films ===
Chun has also directed numerous short films, including Windowbreaker, a selection of the 2007 Sundance Film Festival. Other short films directed by Chun include the World War II set Back to the Front (2006), Document (2006), about a writer whose girlfriend goes into a coma, Cold Feet, Wet Dreams, and the Kitchen Sink (2007), and a sci-fi short entitled Silver Sling (2010), set in a polarized economy of the near future where corporations offer subsidies to their high-ranking female employees to pay for chemically accelerated surrogate births.

== Television work and writing ==
=== Cashmere Mafia ===
Chun was also one of the staff writers for the ABC television series Cashmere Mafia, starring Lucy Liu. Chun was hired for the show based on his and writing partner Mike Weiss' original pilot, Getting in Good, a tongue-in-cheek drama set in the highly competitive world of Manhattan private school admissions. Chun also recently sold a spec pilot to The CW that Dan Jinks is currently producing.

=== Once Upon a Time ===
Chun was a staff writer for the ABC television series Once Upon a Time. He wrote, alongside Scott Nimerfro, episodes 11 "Shattered Sight" and 17 "Heart of Gold" of the fourth season, and episodes 6 "The Bear and the Bow" (with Andrew Chambliss), 10 "Broken Heart" and 16 "Our Decay" (both with Diana Hogan) for season five.

=== Gotham ===
Chun was the executive story editor for season three of the Fox television series Gotham, and wrote episodes 8 "Blood Rush" and 18 "Light the Wick".

Chun was the co-producer/writer for season four of Gotham, and wrote episodes 5 "The Blade's Path", 13 "A Beautiful Darkness" and 21 "One Bad Day".

Chun was the supervising producer/writer for season five of Gotham, and wrote three episodes: "Penguin, Our Hero", "Ace Chemicals" and "They Did What?".

=== Little America ===
Chun was the director/writer for the sixth episode of season one, "The Grand Prize Expo Winners", of Apple TV+'s Little America, an American anthology television series.

=== Gremlins ===
Chun is an executive producer and writer for the animated prequel series adaption of Gremlins on Max.

=== I'm a Virgo ===
Chun is an executive producer and co-showrunner of Boots Riley’s Amazon series I'm a Virgo starring Moonlight's Jharrel Jerome. Riley wrote and directed the series. Chun serves as executive producer along with Michael Ellenberg and Jerome.

== Comic work ==
Chun is a co-founder and publisher for TKO Studios, which was launched Dec 2018. George Gustines of The New York Times wrote that TKO Studios is "A New Comics Publisher Aims to Shake Things Up." Graeme McMillan of The Hollywood Reporter reported that "TKO Studios Plans to Change How Readers Buy Comics."

== Accolades ==
In 2007, Chun was named one of the "25 New Faces of Independent Film" by Filmmaker.

In 2009, Chun received the Puma Emerging Filmmaker Award at the 2009 Hawaii International Film Festival and the George C. Lin Emerging Filmmaker Award at the DC Asian Pacific American Film Festival. He also received the "Visionary Award" from the Austin Asian American Film Festival.

In 2011, Chun was named as a United States Artists (USA) Fellow, specifically a USA Rockefeller fellow.

== Visual art ==
Chun is also a painter and visual artist. He has commissioned private portraits in cities such as New York and Los Angeles, is represented by CVZContemporary Gallery in SoHo, and also painted the original artwork for the poster of the Oscar nominated feature film starring Ryan Gosling, Half Nelson directed by Ryan Fleck, as well as the children's book drawings that are also used in the film.

During Comic-Con 2010 in San Diego, it was announced that Will Eisner's groundbreaking graphic novel A Contract With God will be adapted into a feature film, with Chun directing one of the story's four chapters.
