= California Solo =

American independent feature film by Marshall Lewy

- Directed by: Marshall Lewy
- Written by: Marshall Lewy
- Produced by: Mynette Louie
- Starring: Robert Carlyle; Alexia Rasmussen; Kathleen Wilhoite; A Martinez; Michael Des Barres; Danny Masterson; Savannah Lathem
- Cinematography: James Laxton
- Edited by: Alex Jablonski
- Music by: T. Griffin
- Distributed by: Strand Releasing
- Release dates: January 25, 2012 (Sundance); November 30, 2012 (United States)
- Running time: 94 minutes
- Country: United States
- Language: English

California Solo is an American independent feature film written and directed by Marshall Lewy and starring Robert Carlyle. It made its world premiere at the 2012 Sundance Film Festival, and its international premiere at the 2012 Edinburgh Film Festival. The film was acquired by Strand Releasing for the U.S., and was given a limited theatrical release on November 30, 2012.

== Plot ==
Robert Carlyle plays Lachlan MacAldonich, a former Britpop rocker-turned-agricultural worker, who gets caught driving drunk and faces deportation after living in Los Angeles for 12 years. His efforts to stay in the U.S. force him to confront his past and current demons. The film addresses immigration issues, alcoholism, and personal redemption.

== Cast ==
=== Main cast ===
- Robert Carlyle as Lachlan MacAldonich
- Danny Masterson as Paul
- A Martinez as Warren
- Kathleen Wilhoite as Catherine
- Alexia Rasmussen as Beau
- William Russ as Rusty
- Niko Nicotera as Nick
- Michael Des Barres as Wendell
- Patrick Gallagher as Ice Officer
- Ella Joyce as Carol
- Anna Khaja as Anna
- Robert Cicchini as Domenico
- Brad Greenquist as Piper
- Savannah Lathem as Arianwen

=== Supporting cast ===
- Hal Landon Jr. as Farmer
- Lina Carollo as Bar Patron
- Ping Wu as Judge
- Virginia Hankins as Farmer's Market Patron
- Wiley M. Pickett as Deputy
- Sean Scott McCracken as Clubber (Credited as Sean McCracken)
- Brian Chenoweth as Bartender
- Eli Vargas as Julian
- Paquita Hughes as Farmer's Market Patron
- Tre Ryan as Court Bailiff
- Albert Serrato as Worker
- Cat Forrest as Farmers Market patron
- Carla Short as Farmer's Market Shopper
- Stephen Jared as Patrolman
- Tatiana Monteiro as Paul's friend
- Daniela Flynn as Lawyer
- Tellier Killaby as Farmers Market Patron
- Lindsay Fishkin as Farmer's Market Customer
- Dean Bruni as Defendant
- Willie Dean Brown III as Waitress
- Adam Arian as Paul's Friend
- Jamal Kazak as I.C.E. officer
- Gandhi Fernando as Vendor
- Cruz Flores as Worker
- Amanda Marlon as Farmers Market Patron
- Robert Javinett as Bar Patron
- Christopher Cross as Record store owner
- Nick Wellin as Court Room Attendee
- LaRosa Howland as Pauls Friend
- Kyle Brunick as Defendant
- Trixx Ian Vitolo as Courthouse worker
- Andy Dale as Jack
- Kristin Gagliardi as Waitress
- Celestine as Extra
- Iris Bryant as Lawyer
- Darren K. Hutchinson as Deputy Sheriff
- Amy Kalp as Lawyer
- Taylor Matijevich as Club Patron
- Monica Davis as Clubber
- Tim Alba as Farmer's Market Patron
- Courtney Howard as Cafe Patron
- Anthony Rodrigo Castillo as Vendor
- Alin Gabriel Pop as Worker
- Jack Arsenault as Festival Goer
- Shannon Joy Madden as Waitress
- Karin Koller as Woman at the Atm
- Christina Sardinas as Farmer's Market Patron
- Beca Rehaut as Farmers Market Customer
- Tommy Shayne Manfredi as Farmers Market Patron
- Sarah Rose Yu as Waitress
- Lindsey Hopkins as Clubber
- Brittany Lillie as Farmers Market Patron
- Calen Moore as Farmers Market Patron
- Ion Baleanu as Pool Player
- Curt Sletten as Vendor
- Claude Bragg as Farmer's Market Patron
- Alexandria Tyson as Bar Regular
- Harold Pappy Tucker as Bar Regular
- Nathan Malone as Drunk Tank Guy
- Sarah J. Yu as Waitress
- Yolanda Scott as Vendor
- Anne Symmes as Club Patron
- Curt Darwin as Lawyer
- John E. Berkman as Farmers Market Shopper
- Joy A. Kennelly as Brunch Patron
- Jim Cox as Bar Regular

=== Cameo/uncredited cast ===
- Peter Christian as Background Lawyer
- Sean Keehan as Parolee
- George Steeves as Guitar Shop Patron
- Robert Stilwell as Brunch Patron
- Khai Thach as Market Vendor

== Production ==
Lewy wrote the part of Lachlan MacAldonich with Robert Carlyle in mind. Carlyle has remarked, "It was an easy sell to get me to do it" and he drew inspiration for the character from his friends, the Gallagher brothers of Oasis.

The film shot for 21 days in June 2011 in Leona Valley, Lancaster, Moorpark, and many neighborhoods of Los Angeles, including Silver Lake, Los Feliz, Atwater Village, Sun Valley, Downtown, Highland Park, Hollywood, and Culver City. Its title song was written specifically for the film by Adam Franklin.

== Reception and awards ==
"California Solo" is a New York Times Critics Pick. Critics have praised Robert Carlyle's performance, calling it "open and utterly human", "effortlessly engaging", "soulful and layered", and "stunning...perhaps his best since Trainspotting’s Begbie". The Huffington Post called the film a "touching drama" and The Hollywood Reporter called it a "fragile drama with emotional heft."

The film won the Best Narrative Feature and Best Editing awards at the 2012 Woodstock Film Festival. Robert Carlyle won the Outstanding Acting Award at the 2012 Tallgrass Film Festival. Additionally, producer Mynette Louie won the 2013 Independent Spirit Awards' Piaget Producers Award. In May 2013, Savannah Lathem won the Young Artist Award for Best Supporting Young Actress in a Feature Film.
