= The Huntress (2026 film) =

- Spanish: La Cazadora
- Directed by: Suzanne Andrews Correa
- Written by: Suzanne Andrews Correa
- Produced by: Gabriela Maire; Edher Campos; Mynette Louie
- Starring: Adriana Paz; Teresa Sánchez; Jennifer Trejo; Eme Malafe; Guillermo Alonso
- Cinematography: Maria Sarasvati Herrera
- Edited by: Gilberto González Penilla
- Music by: Tomás Barreiro
- Production companies: Zafiro Cinema; The Population
- Release date: January 22, 2026 (Sundance Film Festival)
- Running time: 91 minutes
- Countries: Mexico; United States
- Language: Spanish

The Huntress (Spanish: La Cazadora) is a 2026 drama thriller film written and directed by Suzanne Andrews Correa.

The film premiered at the Sundance Film Festival on January 22, 2026.

== Cast ==
- Adriana Paz as Luz
- Teresa Sánchez as Ximena
- Jennifer Trejo as Ale
- Eme Malafe as Jaime
- Guillermo Alonso as Rosales

== Production ==
In December 2024, it was reported that a drama thriller film written and directed by Suzanne Andrews Correa was in development, with Adriana Paz in the lead role as Luz, with Teresa Sánchez, Jennifer Trejo, Eme Malafe, and Guillermo Alonso rounding out the cast.

== Release ==
The Huntress premiered at the Sundance Film Festival on January 22, 2026. It will receive its European premiere at the Leiden International Film Festival on October 18, 2026. [4]
