= I Carry You with Me =

2020 American-Mexican drama film

I Carry You with Me (Te Llevo Conmigo)
- Theatrical release poster
- Directed by: Heidi Ewing
- Written by: Heidi Ewing; Alan Page Arriaga
- Produced by: Mynette Louie; Heidi Ewing; Gabriela Maire; Edher Campos
- Starring: Armando Espitia; Christian Vázquez; Michelle Rodríguez; Ángeles Cruz; Arcelia Ramírez; Michelle González
- Cinematography: Juan Pablo Ramírez
- Edited by: Enat Sidi
- Music by: Jay Wadley
- Production companies: Black Bear Pictures; Loki Films; The Population; Zafiro Cinema
- Distributed by: Sony Pictures Classics; Stage 6 Films
- Release dates: January 26, 2020 (Sundance); June 25, 2021 (United States); July 8, 2021 (Mexico)
- Running time: 111 minutes
- Countries: United States; Mexico
- Language: Spanish
- Box office: $192,824

I Carry You with Me (Spanish: Te Llevo Conmigo) is a 2020 romantic drama film directed by Heidi Ewing, from a screenplay by Ewing and Alan Page Arriaga. It stars Armando Espitia, Christian Vázquez, Michelle Rodríguez, Ángeles Cruz, Arcelia Ramírez and Michelle González.

It had its world premiere at the Sundance Film Festival on January 26, 2020, where it won both the NEXT Innovator and Audience Awards. It was released theatrically during the COVID-19 pandemic on June 25, 2021 by Sony Pictures Classics in the U.S., and on July 8, 2021 by Sony Pictures Mexico in Mexico. It was released on digital and Blu-ray on September 21, 2021.

== Premise ==
Based on true love, this decades spanning romance begins in Mexico between an aspiring chef (Armando Espitia) and a teacher (Christian Vázquez). Their lives restart in incredible ways as societal pressure propels them to embark on a treacherous journey to New York City with dreams, hopes, and memories in tow.

== Cast ==
- Armando Espitia as Iván
- Christian Vázquez as Gerardo
- Michelle Rodríguez as Sandra
- Ángeles Cruz as Rosa Maria
- Arcelia Ramírez as Madga
- Michelle González as Paola
- Raúl Briones as Marcos
- Pascacio López as César
- Luis Alberti as Cucusa

== Production ==
The film is a co-production between Mexico and the United States, and was shot in Mexico City, Puebla City, Jilotepec, Zapotitlán, Lerma, and New York City.

== Release ==
The film had its world premiere at the Sundance Film Festival on January 26, 2020. Shortly after, Sony Pictures Classics and Stage 6 Films acquired worldwide distribution rights to the film. The film was set to screen at the Tribeca Film Festival in April 2020, followed by a theatrical release on June 19, 2020, but both the festival and release were cancelled due to the COVID-19 pandemic.

The film screened at the New York Film Festival on October 2, 2020 and other festivals including AFI Fest, Hamptons, Morelia, Busan, Rome, Zurich, Athens, Bergen, and Golden Horse. After several postponed release dates were cancelled due to the COVID-19 pandemic, the film had an awards qualifying run starting December 4, 2020, and was scheduled to be released on January 8, 2021. However, it was pulled from the schedule and set for an undisclosed 2021 date. It was finally released in U.S. theaters on June 25, 2021 and Mexico theaters on July 8, 2021, where it debuted in the top 10 films at the box office.

== Critical reception ==
I Carry You with Me holds a 97% approval rating on review aggregator website Rotten Tomatoes, based on 89 reviews, with an average of 7.9/10. The website's critics' consensus reads: "A remarkable feature debut for director Heidi Ewing, I Carry You with Me finds universally resonant themes in a specific, richly detailed time and place." On Metacritic, the film holds a rating of 76 out of 100, based on 23 critics, indicating "generally favorable" reviews.

It was cited on several "Best Films of the Year" lists in both 2020 and 2021, including The Washington Post, The Salt Lake Tribune, Remezcla, The Film Stage, People en Español, Rolling Stone, The Hollywood Reporter, and TheWrap.

=== Accolades ===
Award	Date of ceremony	Category	Recipient(s)	Result	Ref.
Sundance Film Festival	February 1, 2020	NEXT Competition Innovator Award	I Carry You with Me	Won	
Sundance Film Festival	February 1, 2020	NEXT Competition Audience Award	I Carry You with Me	Won	
Imagen Awards	September 24, 2020	Best Feature Film	I Carry You with Me	Nominated	
Imagen Awards	September 24, 2020	Best Director - Feature Film	Heidi Ewing	Nominated	
Imagen Awards	September 24, 2020	Best Actor - Feature Film	Armando Espitia	Nominated	
Key West Film Festival	November 23, 2020	Critics' Award	I Carry You with Me	Won	
Hawaii Film Critics Society Awards	January 12, 2021	Best Foreign Language Film	I Carry You with Me	Nominated	
Kansas City Film Critics Circle	January 24, 2021	Best Foreign Film	I Carry You with Me	Nominated	
Latino Entertainment Film Awards	March 7, 2021	Best Picture	I Carry You with Me	Nominated	
Latino Entertainment Film Awards	March 7, 2021	Best Actor	Armando Espitia	Nominated	
Latino Entertainment Film Awards	March 7, 2021	Best International Film	I Carry You with Me	Nominated	
Cinema Eye Honors	March 9, 2021	Heterodox Award	I Carry You with Me	Nominated	
GLAAD Media Awards	April 8, 2021	Outstanding Film – Limited Release	I Carry You with Me	Nominated	
Dorian Awards	April 18, 2021	Best Foreign Language Film	I Carry You with Me	Nominated	
Dorian Awards	April 18, 2021	Best LGBTQ Film	I Carry You with Me	Nominated	
Independent Spirit Awards	April 22, 2021	Best First Feature	Heidi Ewing, Mynette Louie, Gabriela Maire, Edher Campos	Nominated	
Independent Spirit Awards	April 22, 2021	Best Editing	Enat Sidi	Nominated	
Ariel Awards	September 27, 2021	Best Actor	Armando Espitia	Nominated	
Ariel Awards	September 27, 2021	Best Supporting Actor	Christian Vázquez	Nominated	
Ariel Awards	September 27, 2021	Best Supporting Actress	Michelle Rodríguez	Nominated	
Ariel Awards	September 27, 2021	Best Production Design	Sandra Cabriada	Nominated	
Impulse LGBTIQ+ Awards	November 29, 2021	LGBTIQ+ Film of the Year	I Carry You with Me	Won	
Canacine Awards	December 9, 2021	Best Picture	I Carry You with Me	Nominated	
Canacine Awards	December 9, 2021	Best Actor	Armando Espitia	Nominated	
Queerties	March 1, 2022	Best Indie Movie	I Carry You with Me	Nominated	
