= DC Asian Pacific American Film Festival =

- Location: Washington, DC
- Founded: 2000
- Hosted by: Asian Pacific American Film, Inc.
- Website: http://www.apafilm.org/

The DC Asian Pacific American Film Festival is an annual film festival that screens feature films and short films. It is produced by Asian Pacific American Film, Inc., a nonprofit, tax-exempt charity under 501(c)(3) of the Internal Revenue Code in the capital of the United States, Washington, DC. It takes place during the beginning of October each year and includes venues in the downtown Washington, DC area that includes: Landmark's E Street Cinema, Goethe-Institut, and the Meyer Auditorium at the Smithsonian Institution, Freer Gallery of Art and Arthur M. Sackler Gallery.

== Awards Presented ==
=== George C. Lin Emerging Filmmaker Award ===
The George C. Lin Emerging Filmmaker Award was established in 2009 to recognize young and talented filmmakers that have shown an exemplary commitment to filmmaking within the Asian and Asian American film genre. This award is given on an annual basis by the George C. Lin Memorial Fund on behalf of The San Diego Foundation, Asian Pacific American Film, Inc. (of Washington, DC), and The San Diego Asian Film Foundation, and includes a cash prize. George C. Lin was the founding executive director of Asian Pacific American Film, Inc., and associate festival director of the San Diego Asian Film Foundation. Director Tze Chun received the inaugural award for his feature film debut Children of Invention.

=== Short Film Awards ===
Best Short Documentary Best Short Narrative

=== Feature Film Awards ===
Best Feature Documentary Best Feature Narrative

== Mission ==
The mission of the DC Asian Pacific American Film Festival is to bring attention to the creative output from Asian Pacific American (APA) communities and encourage the artistic development of APA films in the greater Washington, DC metropolitan area.

=== Goals ===
The mission of Asian Pacific American Film, Inc. embodies the following goals:

  1. To raise public awareness of APA media arts
  2. To encourage and promote the artistic development of APA media artists
  3. To provide arts education opportunities, with particular outreach to APA youth and adults
  4. To raise awareness and act as a catalyst for the discussion of issues affecting APA communities
  5. To bring diverse people together, to promote artistic and social interactions
  6. To sponsor a DC Asian Pacific American Film Festival annually

=== P.O.V. (Point-of-View) Youth Filmmaker Workshop ===
The P.O.V. Youth Filmmaker Workshop, a youth filmmaking training program designed to empower and provide a voice to local Asian Pacific American youth by teaching them the art of movie-making, has been a part of Asian Pacific American Film, Inc. since 2006. The program consists of a series of workshops taking place over the course of six consecutive weekends, during which participants will learn the necessary skills and steps to create a short film from conception to completion. The P.O.V. workshop also provides an opportunity to showcase students’ work to the general public by creating a final short film that premieres during the DC Asian Pacific American Film Festival.

== History ==
Asian Pacific American Film, Inc. (APA Film) was established in 2000. APA Film produces an annual film festival based in Washington, DC devoted to film and media arts made by and/or about Americans of Asian Pacific Islander descent and other Asian diasporic groups from around the world. As a nonprofit, tax-exempt charity under 501(c)(3) of the Internal Revenue Code, the value of goods, services, and benefits received in exchange for support is determined by APA Film. Any contribution above that amount is tax-deductible to the extent permitted by law.
