= Gamechanger Films =

American film company

- Industry: Film
- Founded: September 27, 2013 in New York City, New York, United States
- Founders: Julie Parker Benello; Dan Cogan; Geralyn Dreyfous; Wendy Ettinger
- Area served: Worldwide
- Services: Film financing
- Website: gamechanger-films.com

Gamechanger Films is an American company that finances independent films directed by women.

== History ==
Gamechanger Films was founded in 2013 by Julie Parker Benello, Dan Cogan, Geralyn Dreyfous, Wendy Ettinger. Mynette Louie was the President, Derek Nguyen was the Director of Operations & Creative Affairs, and Mary Jane Skalski is the senior adviser. Louie and Nguyen departed to start their own company, The Population, in 2019. Brenda Robinson is a new partner in Gamechanger Films 2.0, which is led by Effie T. Brown.

Films funded must be directed or co-directed by a woman, but they may be of any genre. Films do not need to be focused on females or female-centric topics. They support films of a budget of $2 million or less. Funding was raised by Chicken & Egg Pictures and Impact Partners and comes from equity investors. Gamechanger Films is for-profit. Louie said that their goal "is to finance films that are critically and commercially viable". As a result of this, they do not fund experimental non-narrative films. In 2014, they established a $2500 grant for female directors who screen their films at South by Southwest.

== Films financed ==
- Land Ho!
- The Invitation
- Addicted to Fresno
- Lovesong
- Buster's Mal Heart
- The Strange Ones
- Hunting Season (Temporada de Caza)
- The Long Dumb Road
- The Tale
- Nancy
- Passing
