= Children of Invention =

- Directed by: Tze Chun
- Written by: Tze Chun
- Produced by: Mynette Louie; Trevor Sagan
- Starring: Cindy Cheung; Michael Chen; Crystal Chiu
- Cinematography: Chris Teague
- Edited by: Anna Boden
- Music by: T. Griffin
- Distributed by: N/A
- Release dates: January 18, 2009 (Sundance); March 12, 2010 (United States)
- Running time: 86 minutes
- Country: United States
- Language: English

Children of Invention is an American independent feature film written and directed by Tze Chun. It premiered at the 2009 Sundance Film Festival, screened at more than 50 film festivals, and won 17 festival awards including 8 Grand Jury or Best Narrative Feature prizes. The film was released theatrically in eight U.S. cities beginning February 2010, on Video-on-Demand in June 2010, and on DVD in August 2010.

== Plot ==
The first half of the movie centers around Elaine Cheng (played by Cindy Cheung), a single mother and immigrant living in the Boston suburbs, and the life she provides for her two children (played by Michael Chen and Crystal Chiu). As a way to cope and entertain themselves, the kids invent things. The mother is drawn to pyramid schemes as a way to get ahead and repeatedly loses money. Eventually her two young children are left to fend for themselves when their mother is arrested by the police. The film is loosely based on Tze Chun's own childhood, as well as his Sundance 2007 short film, Windowbreaker.

== Production ==
Though set in Boston, the film shot 20 days in and around New York City and 4 days in Boston. The film premiered at Sundance just 10 months after the first draft of the script was completed.

== Critical reception ==
The film was very well received by critics, including The New York Times, Los Angeles Times, The Village Voice, New York Post, Variety, LA Weekly, USA Today, Chicago Reader, Film Threat, and The Boston Globe. It was named one of the Top 13 Films of 2009 by Hammer to Nail, and one of the best undistributed films of 2009 by several critics including IFC's Alison Willmore. In 2010, the year of its commercial release, it made several more "best films of the year" lists including the list by Turner Classic Movies' blog.

On the review aggregator website Rotten Tomatoes, 79% of 14 critics' reviews are positive. Metacritic, which uses a weighted average, assigned the film a score of 67 out of 100, based on 8 critics, indicating "generally favorable" reviews.

== Accolades ==
The film also won the following 17 festival awards:

- Grand Jury Prize, Best Narrative Feature - Independent Film Festival of Boston
- Grand Jury Prize, Best Narrative Feature - Newport International Film Festival
- Grand Jury Prize, Best Narrative Feature - Los Angeles Asian Pacific Film Festival
- Grand Jury Prize, Best Film - San Diego Asian Film Festival
- Best Narrative Feature - San Diego Asian Film Festival
- Best Narrative Feature - Ojai-Ventura International Film Festival
- Outstanding International Feature - ReelWorld Film Festival
- Best of Festival - Roxbury Film Festival
- Special Jury Prize, Best Narrative Feature - Sarasota Film Festival
- Special Jury Award - San Francisco International Asian American Film Festival
- Special Jury Prize, Acting Ensemble - Nashville Film Festival
- Special Jury Prize, New Talent to Watch in Acting - Los Angeles Asian Pacific Film Festival
- Special Jury Prize, Emotional Storytelling - Indie Memphis Film Festival
- Honorable Mention, Editing - Woodstock Film Festival
- George C. Lin Emerging Filmmaker Award - DC Asian Pacific American Film Festival
- Puma Emerging Filmmaker Award - Hawaii International Film Festival
- Visionary Award - Austin Asian American Film Festival

== Distribution ==
Tze Chun and the film's producer Mynette Louie were named in Ted Hope's list of "21 Great Free Thinkers of Indie Film" for their DIY festival/DVD distribution strategy. The film debuted theatrically in Boston on February 26, 2010, and in New York and Los Angeles on March 12, 2010, followed by additional theatrical engagements in other cities. It was released on Video-on-Demand beginning in June 2010, and on DVD on August 10, 2010.
