= The Tale =

2018 film by Jennifer Fox

- Film release poster
- Directed by: Jennifer Fox
- Written by: Jennifer Fox
- Produced by: Jennifer Fox; Oren Moverman; Laura Rister; Mynette Louie; Simone Pero; Lawrence Inglee; Sol Bondy; Regina K. Scully; Lynda Weinman; Reka Posta
- Starring: Laura Dern; Ellen Burstyn; Jason Ritter; Elizabeth Debicki; Isabelle Nélisse; Common; Frances Conroy; John Heard
- Cinematography: Denis Lenoir; Ivan Strasburg
- Edited by: Alex Hall; Gary Levy; Anne Fabini
- Music by: Ariel Marx
- Production companies: Gamechanger Films; Fork Films; One Two Films; WeatherVane Productions; Blackbird Films
- Distributed by: HBO Films
- Release dates: January 20, 2018 (Sundance); May 26, 2018 (United States)
- Running time: 114 minutes
- Country: United States
- Language: English

The Tale is a 2018 American drama film written and directed by Jennifer Fox and starring Laura Dern, Ellen Burstyn, Jason Ritter, Elizabeth Debicki, Isabelle Nélisse, Common, Frances Conroy, and John Heard. It tells the story of Fox's own child sexual abuse and her coming to terms with it in her later life. It premiered at the 2018 Sundance Film Festival and aired on HBO on May 26, 2018. Despite making the film in 2018, she waited five years – and two years after her abuser's death – to reveal in a 2023 interview that her abuser was Ted Nash, a two-time Olympic medalist in rowing and nine-time Olympic coach. During the same interview, she identified her former riding instructor, Susie Buchanan, as an accomplice to Nash.

== Plot ==
Jennifer Fox is an acclaimed documentary filmmaker and professor in her 40s when her mother, Nettie, calls her in alarm after discovering an essay she wrote when she was 13. The essay is about a "relationship" Jennifer had when she was 13 which she dismisses as something she hid from her mother at the time so as not to upset her because her boyfriend was "older".

After re-reading the essay Jennifer begins to research that period in her life. She imagines herself as being older and sophisticated but is surprised at how small and childlike she appears in photos from that time. Jennifer's relationship began one summer when she attended an intensive horse training camp with three other girls. She lived with the beautiful and enigmatic Mrs. G, who also had Jenny and the girls run with professional coach Bill Allens, who was in his 40s. After the summer ends Mrs. G and Bill reveal to Jenny they are lovers.

After the camp, Jenny kept her horse with Mrs. G and continued to see her and Bill on the weekends. Eventually, Jenny began spending time with Bill alone. He began sexually grooming her, until finally raping her, telling her that they were "making love".

When Jennifer's partner finds letters written to her by Bill, he says that she was raped, but she refuses to see it that way, proclaiming that she is not a victim. However, she slowly begins to question whether her recollections are accurate and eventually realizes despite her protests she had been exhibiting symptoms of being sexually abused for years. She goes to visit Mrs. G who refuses to acknowledge her role in Jenny's abuse and asks her to leave.

As Jennifer continues to investigate that summer, she realizes that Bill and Mrs. G were probably grooming other girls. She remembers a college student named Iris Rose who worked for Mrs. G. Jennifer tracks Iris Rose down who tells her that she, Mrs. G, and Bill had threesomes and that Mrs. G was actively involved in finding girls for Bill. This prompts Jennifer to remember that she was supposed to participate in group sex with Mrs. G, Bill, and Iris one weekend. Jenny, who threw up each time she was raped by Bill, had an anxiety attack and threw up the day before she was to go away for the weekend, causing her mother to keep her at home. Realizing she no longer wanted to be in a relationship with Bill, Jenny called him and broke up with him, even as he pleaded with her to stay. Unlike Bill, Mrs. G coldly accepted Jenny's decision to remove her horse that weekend. Jenny wrote about her time with Bill in an essay for school (calling it a work of fiction) in which she proclaimed herself a hero, not a victim; this is the essay her mother finds at the beginning of the film.

Jennifer attends an awards ceremony where Bill is being honored in order to confront him, calling him out as a child molester in front of his wife and the other attendees. Bill denies everything and leaves. Jennifer has a panic attack and goes to the bathroom, and imagines sitting with her 13-year-old self.

== Cast ==
- Laura Dern as Jennifer "Jenny" Fox
  - Isabelle Nélisse as Jenny Fox, Age 13
  - Jessica Sarah Flaum as Jenny Fox, Age 15
- Elizabeth Debicki as Jane "Mrs. G" Gramercy, Jennifer's riding instructor
  - Frances Conroy as Older Jane Gramercy
- Jason Ritter as William P. "Bill" Allens, Jennifer's running coach and Mrs. G's lover. In 2023, and two years after his death, Fox named Ted Nash as her abuser.
  - John Heard as Older Bill Allens
- Ellen Burstyn as Nadine "Nettie" Fox, Jennifer's mother
  - Laura Allen as Young Nettie Fox
- Common as Martin, Jennifer's boyfriend
- Jodi Long as Becky
  - Shay Lee Abeson as Young Becky
- Tina Parker as Franny
  - Isabella Amara as Young Franny

== Production ==
In May 2015, it was announced that Laura Dern, Ellen Burstyn, Elizabeth Debicki, and Sebastian Koch would star in The Tale, and Common, Jason Ritter, Frances Conroy, and John Heard were in the cast. It was also reported that the film was being shopped to foreign buyers at the Cannes Film Festival. At the time, it was expected that principal photography would begin that summer, however, it began in Louisiana on October 20, 2015, and wrapped two months later.

== Release ==
In January 2018, HBO Films acquired distribution rights to the film. It premiered on HBO on May 26, 2018.

== Reception ==
=== Critical response ===
The Tale was met with critical acclaim. On review aggregator website Rotten Tomatoes, the film holds an approval rating of 99% based on 81 reviews, with an average rating of 8.9/10. The website's critical consensus reads, "The Tale handles its extraordinarily challenging subject matter with sensitivity, grace, and the power of some standout performances led by a remarkable Laura Dern." On Metacritic, the film has a weighted average score of 90 out of 100, based on 26 critics, indicating "universal acclaim".

== Accolades ==
Year	Award	Category	Nominee(s)	Result	Ref.
2018	Primetime Emmy Awards	Outstanding Television Movie	Jennifer Fox, Oren Moverman, Laura Rister, Mynette Louie, Simone Pero, Lawrence Inglee, Sol Bondy, Reka Posta	Nominated	
2018	Primetime Emmy Awards	Outstanding Lead Actress in a Limited or Anthology Series or Movie	Laura Dern	Nominated	
2018	Gotham Awards	Bingham Ray Breakthrough Director Award	Jennifer Fox	Nominated	
2019	Golden Globe Awards	Best Actress – Miniseries or Television Film	Laura Dern	Nominated	
2019	Critics' Choice Awards	Best Movie/ Miniseries	Jennifer Fox, Oren Moverman, Laura Rister, Mynette Louie, Simone Pero, Lawrence Inglee, Sol Bondy, Reka Posta	Nominated	
2019	Critics' Choice Awards	Best Actress in a Movie/ Miniseries	Laura Dern	Nominated	
2019	Critics' Choice Awards	Best Supporting Actress in a Movie/Miniseries	Ellen Burstyn	Nominated	
2019	Independent Spirit Awards	Best First Feature	Jennifer Fox, Oren Moverman, Laura Rister, Mynette Louie, Simone Pero, Lawrence Inglee, Sol Bondy, Reka Posta	Nominated	
2019	Independent Spirit Awards	Best First Screenplay	Jennifer Fox	Nominated	
2019	Independent Spirit Awards	Best Editing	Anne Fabini, Alex Hall and Gary Levy	Nominated	
2019	Satellite Awards	Best Television Film	Jennifer Fox, Oren Moverman, Laura Rister, Mynette Louie, Lawrence Inglee, Sol Bondy, Simone Pero, Reka Posta	Won	
2019	Satellite Awards	Best Actress in a Miniseries or TV Film	Laura Dern	Nominated	
