= Cindy Cheung (actress) =

American actress of Chinese descent

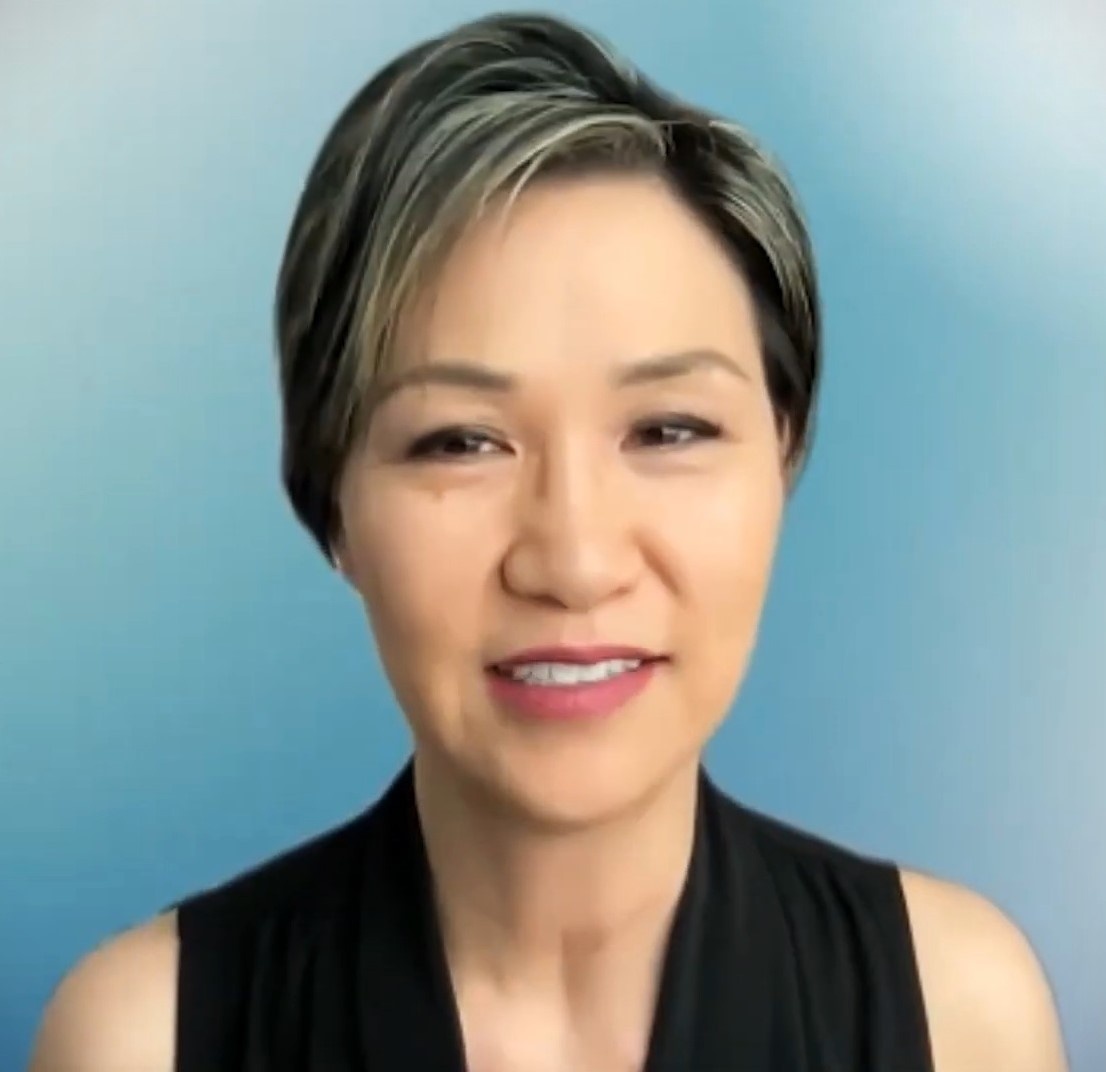
- Cheung in 2022
- Born: 1970 (age 55–56)
- Education: American Conservatory Theater (MFA)
- Occupation: Actress
- Years active: 1995–present

Cindy Cheung is a American actress, best known for playing the role of Young-Soon Choi in Lady in the Water and Elaine Cheng in Children of Invention. In 2021, she portrayed Stephanie Lam in season 4 of The Sinner.

== Early years ==
Born in 1970, Cheung is from La Palma, California. She majored in applied mathematics at UCLA.

== Career ==
Cheung's first acting role was in an episode of Seinfeld, although her scene was cut. In 1998, she moved to New York to pursue acting. Cheung is a founding member of Mr. Miyagi's Theatre Company and has a MFA in acting from the American Conservatory Theater in San Francisco. She debuted her solo show Speak Up Connie, directed by BD Wong, in January 2012.

In 2021, she portrayed Stephanie Lam in 7 episodes of The Sinner (season 4).

== Filmography ==
=== Film ===
| Year | Title | Role | Notes |
|---|---|---|---|
| 2000 | Speed for Thespians | Nurse | Short film |
| 2003 | Robot Stories | Grace | |
| 2004 | Spider-Man 2 | Chinese Daughter | Uncredited |
| 2005 | Red Doors | Grace | |
| 2006 | Falling for Grace | Kari Mills | |
| 2006 | Lady in the Water | Young-Soon Choi | Winner of Worst Supporting Actress, Most Annoying Fake Accent (Female) at 2007 Stinkers Bad Movie Awards |
| 2008 | Kung Fu Granny | Winnie Leung | Short film |
| 2009 | Children of Invention | Elaine Cheng | Special Jury Prize for Acting Ensemble at 2009 Nashville Film Festival, shared with cast |
| 2011 | Room #11 | Jing | Short film |
| 2011 | The Potential Wives of Norman Mao | Winnie Wong | |
| 2013 | The Problem of Gravity | Mother (voice) | Short film |
| 2014 | Obvious Child | Dr. Bernard | |
| 2015 | Mistress America | Karen | |
| 2016 | Wolves | Doc | |
| 2017 | Roxanne Roxanne | Nurse Mitchell | |
| 2017 | The Strange Ones | Sarah's Mother | |
| 2017 | The Light of the Moon | Joanna | |
| 2017 | The Meyerowitz Stories | Nurse #1 | |
| 2018 | A Kid Like Jake | Woman | |
| 2019 | The Sunlit Night | Critic #2 | |
| 2020 | Here After | Carol | |
| 2020 | Survival | Dr. Wong | |
| 2021 | Rushed | Barbara's Attorney | Uncredited |
| 2022 | My Love Affair with Marriage | Velta (voice) | |
| 2023 | Love in Taipei | Auntie Shu | |
| 2025 | The Dinner Plan | Emma | |
| 2026 | Higher Education | Mrs. Sanders | Short film |
| TBA | Karmic Knot | Poetry Moderator (voice) | |

=== Television ===
| Year | Title | Role | Notes |
|---|---|---|---|
| 1995 | Seinfeld | Woman #1 | Episode: "The Engagement" |
| 2004 | Sex and the City | Nurse | Episode: "Out of the Frying Pan" |
| 2005 | Jonny Zero | Nurse | 2 episodes |
| 2005, 2006 | Law & Order: Criminal Intent | Anna Slaughter / Layla | 2 episodes |
| 2006 | Julie Reno, Bounty Hunter | Li Ming | Episode: "Pilot" |
| 2008 | Fringe | Nurse #2 | Episode: "In Which We Meet Mr. Jones" |
| 2008, 2016 | Law & Order: Special Victims Unit | Hospital Doctor / IVF Tech | 2 episodes |
| 2009 | Law & Order | Liu Kang | Episode: "Take-Out" |
| 2009 | One Life to Live | Ellen Kwon | 4 episodes |
| 2010 | White Collar | Registered Nurse | Episode: "Vital Signs" |
| 2011 | Bored to Death | Beatrice | Episode: "Gumball!" |
| 2012 | Made in Jersey | Nurse | Episode: "Ancient History" |
| 2013 | Homeland | OB / GYN | Episode: "A Red Wheelbarrow" |
| 2013–2018 | Blue Bloods | Judge Andros | 4 episodes |
| 2014 | FutureStates | Samantha | Episode: "Happy Fun Room" |
| 2015 | Nurse Jackie | Susan | Episode: "Godfathering" |
| 2015 | The Affair | Woman at Ballet Class | Episode #2.1 |
| 2016 | Elementary | Cindy Park | Episode: "Murder Ex Machina" |
| 2016 | Madam Secretary | Dr. Cary | Episode: "Right of the Boom" |
| 2016, 2017 | House of Cards | Meredith Lee | 2 episodes |
| 2017–2022 | Bull | Wendy Anderson | 2 episodes |
| 2017–2019 | 13 Reasons Why | Karen Dempsey | 10 episodes |
| 2018 | High Maintenance | Therapist | Episode: "Scromple" |
| 2018 | The Good Fight | Lori Ackerman | Episode: "Day 422" |
| 2018 | Kevin Can Wait | Sally | Episode: "The Smoking Bun" |
| 2018 | Dietland | Monique | Episode: "Monster High" |
| 2018–2020 | New Amsterdam | Judge Hayashi | 4 episodes |
| 2019 | Untitled Jessica Gao/ABC Project | Kathy | TV movie |
| 2019–2020 | FBI | NYPD Rep Ann | 4 episodes |
| 2020 | Billions | Ali Kashkhokh | Episode: "The Chris Rock Test" |
| 2020 | Blindspot | Dr. Coleman | 2 episodes |
| 2020 | The Flight Attendant | Jean Miller | Episode: "Rabbits" |
| 2021 | Awkwafina Is Nora from Queens | Susan | Episode: "Edmund's Back" |
| 2021 | The Sinner | Stephanie Lam | 7 episodes |
| 2025 | Dying for Sex | Ann-Marie | Episode: "Feelings Can Become Amplified" |
| 2026 | American Classic | Councilwoman Davies | 3 episodes |
