= In Between Days (film) =

- US theatrical poster
- Hangul: 방황의 날들
- Hanja: 彷徨의 날들
- RR: Banghwangui naldeul
- MR: Panghwangŭi naldŭl
- Directed by: So Yong Kim
- Written by: Bradley Rust Gray; So Yong Kim
- Produced by: Bradley Rust Gray; Jennifer Weiss
- Starring: Taegu Andy Kang; Bokja Kim; Jiseon Kim; Mike Park
- Cinematography: Sarah Levy
- Edited by: So Yong Kim
- Music by: Asobi Seksu
- Distributed by: Kino International; With Cinema
- Release dates: January 23, 2006 (Sundance); June 27, 2007 (United States); September 6, 2007 (South Korea)
- Running time: 83 minutes
- Countries: United States; Canada; South Korea
- Languages: Korean; English
- Box office: $32,458

In Between Days (Korean: 방황의 날들; RR: Banghwangui naldeul) is a 2006 drama film directed by So Yong Kim about a young girl from Korea and her coming of age in her new surroundings. The film premiered at the 2006 Sundance Film Festival and was released into select theaters on June 27, 2007.

== Plot ==
Aimie is a teenage Korean immigrant newly transplanted to the snow-bound city of Toronto with her divorced mother. She experiences difficulty in adapting to her dreary new environment and misses her father back in Korea. One of her lone sources of comfort is her best friend Tran, who is also a Korean immigrant but is more assimilated than her. Aimie starts to harbor feelings for Tran but also isn't sure she wants to be his girlfriend, and the two are confronted with their ambivalent romantic feelings for one another. This manifests in mixed communication between the two teens, wherein one expects the other to read his or her mind, often followed by passive-aggressive tactics when such indirectness inevitably leads to disappointment. This becomes further agitated when Tran shows interest in more "Americanized", outgoing Korean girls. Subplots concern Aimie's strained relationship with her mother, the absence of her father, and her increasing loneliness and isolation as she drifts apart from Tran.

== Cast ==
- Jiseon Kim as Aimie
- Taegu Andy Kang as Tran
- Bokja Kim as Mom
- Kim Gina as Michelle
- Virginia Wu as Michelle's friend
- Mike Park as Steve

== Production ==
So Yong Kim partly based the story on her own experiences growing up in Los Angeles after emigrating from her native Busan, Korea when she was 12 years old. "My intention is to share an immigrant story that is personal and honest. With that in mind, I tried to create an intimate character study of a young girl who is coming of age while adapting to life in a new country," said Kim. The initial script for the film was set in Los Angeles and involved street gangs and stolen car chases, but the plot and characters were adjusted when Kim and her husband Bradley Rust Gray decided to film in Toronto and cast nonprofessionals as the leads. The filmmakers cast Jiseon Kim as Aimie after meeting her in a New Jersey bakery.

The film was shot with a handheld digital video camera with no musical score. The film's language is largely in Korean.

The overpass where Aimie and Tran always cross is next to the Oriole GO Station in Toronto, Ontario.

== Release ==
In Between Days had its world premiere at the 2006 Sundance Film Festival on January 23, 2006. It screened at Berlinale on February 12, 2006 and in Korea at the 2008 Busan International Film Festival. The film was given a limited release by Kino International on June 27, 2007.

== Reception ==
The film garnered praise for capturing not only the adolescent experience, but the immigrant experience as well. A.O. Scott of The New York Times wrote, "In Between Days, the sensitive, modest, thrillingly self-assured first feature by So Yong Kim, was one of the standouts of the 2006 Sundance Film Festival -- exactly the kind of thoughtful, independent work one hopes to find there and too rarely does. Its theatrical release today is an encouraging sign that there is still room, even in the midst of the summer glut, for a small, serious, unpretentious film." Scott commented "How [Aimie] deals with [her] disappointment, and her more general alienation, might have been turned into either a fable of self-esteem or a cautionary tale of youth at risk. Instead, Ms. Kim uses rough, naturalistic cinematography and sound design to bring us into a state of remarkably intimate sympathy with her confused, inarticulate heroine. This fidelity to the ordinary dimensions of experience, which might have become tedious, instead makes In Between Days an exquisite illumination of both Aimie's circumstances and her changing perception of them." Writing for Filmmaker, Jason Guerrasio said "The performances by Kim and Kang, who never acted before this film, are surprisingly well done as So Yong Kim successfully portrays how it is not only to be a teenager, but the isolation of being an immigrant as well."

Ed Gonzales of Slant called the film the most "intriguingly circumscribed romance of the year", commenting "The director's experiment in non-description can be frustrating (where are we? United States? Canada?), but it is also very poetic and humane (totally Dardennian), getting as it does to the core of the pain that comes with cultural assimilation." Gonzales gave the film 3 out of 4 stars and concludes the film evokes "the sense of remoteness felt by young people of color who are just trying to fit in with everyone else." Maitland McDonagh of TV Guide called the film "a small slice of a suspended life, intimate and filled with the mundane details most people forget when the waiting is over and their real lives begin." Lisa Schwarzbaum of Entertainment Weekly gave the film an A grade and described it as "a quiet specimen of personal storytelling at its most exciting", noting Kim "captures feminine melancholy with rare precision."

On review aggregator website Rotten Tomatoes, In Between Days has an approval rating of 86% based on 29 reviews. The site's critics consensus reads, "In Between Days is a moving, artistic slice-of-life indie film."

== Awards and nominations ==
- Berlin International Film Festival
  - FIPRESCI Prize - So Yong Kim, Winner 2006
- Gotham Award
  - Breakthrough Director Award - So Yong Kim, Nominee 2007
- Independent Spirit Awards
  - Someone to Watch Award - So Yong Kim, Nominee 2007
- Sundance Film Festival
  - Special Jury Prize for Independent Vision, Winner 2006
  - Grand Jury Prize, Nominee 2006
