= Nancy (film) =

2018 film by Christina Choe

- Theatrical release poster
- Directed by: Christina Choe
- Written by: Christina Choe
- Produced by: Amy Lo; Michelle Cameron; Andrea Riseborough
- Starring: Andrea Riseborough; J. Smith-Cameron; Ann Dowd; John Leguizamo; Steve Buscemi
- Cinematography: Zoë White
- Edited by: David Gutnik
- Music by: Peter Raeburn
- Production companies: Mental Pictures; Mothersucker Productions; Eon Productions; Gamechanger Films; XS Media
- Distributed by: Samuel Goldwyn Films
- Release dates: January 20, 2018 (Sundance); June 8, 2018 (United States)
- Running time: 87 minutes
- Country: United States
- Language: English
- Box office: $92,000

Nancy is a 2018 American psychological drama film written and directed by Christina Choe in her feature directorial debut. It stars Andrea Riseborough (who also co-produced) in the title role, with J. Smith-Cameron, Ann Dowd, John Leguizamo, and Steve Buscemi in supporting roles. It follows a serial imposter who, blurring lines between fact and fiction, becomes increasingly convinced she was kidnapped as a child.

The film had its world premiere at the Sundance Film Festival on January 20, 2018, where Choe won the Waldo Salt Screenwriting Award. It was theatrically released in the United States on June 8, 2018, by Samuel Goldwyn Films. It received positive reviews from critics, who mostly praised Choe's screenplay and the performances of Riseborough, Smith-Cameron, and Buscemi. At the 34th Independent Spirit Awards, it earned two nominations: Best Supporting Female (for Smith-Cameron) and Best First Screenplay (for Choe).

== Plot ==
Nancy Freeman is a lonely woman who lives with her ailing mother Betty. An aspiring short story writer whose submissions are routinely rejected, Nancy finds an outlet for her creativity and need for attention and affection by running a blog in which she claims to be the grieving mother of a dead child. Off the blog, she meets Jeb, a divorced father grieving the loss of his daughter. Posing as being pregnant, having purchased a prosthetic belly, they get coffee together and connect. However, upon a chance encounter at a grocery store, Jeb discovers that Nancy isn't pregnant after all and becomes upset and never sees her again.

Soon thereafter, Betty passes away from a stroke. Nancy sees a news report about a couple - Leo and Ellen - who have never given up the search for their daughter, who was kidnapped as a child thirty years prior. Noting a vague resemblance between herself and an age progression of the couple's daughter, Nancy contacts them, claiming she may have been kidnapped and that she is their child.

Ellen, a professor of comparative literature, is quick to believe that Nancy is her daughter after seeing a photo of her while Leo, a psychologist, remains more skeptical. When Nancy visits, he quickly sets up a DNA test for the next day. Nancy's cat is parked in the sun room as Leo is allergic.

After dinner, Ellen sleeps alongside Nancy, in her daughter's bedroom - which hasn't been changed or slept in since her disappearance. She sleeps deeply. Next day, Leo shows Nancy his photo gallery in the attic and takes her photo. A man arrives to take a saliva sample and ask Nancy a few questions. He says the DNA test will take three days. The three then go to an art gallery together and share meals and get to know each other. Nancy confides in Ellen her dream of being a writer and shares her work with the couple. Ellen enjoys it and offers to send it to an editor she knows, much to Nancy's delight.

Ellen receives the results of the DNA test results and it is confirmed that Nancy isn't her daughter. On a walk with Nancy, she reveals she blames herself for her daughter's disappearance as Brooke ran off to see a kitten in a pet shop. Nancy comforts her. A gunshot is heard and a young man runs out desperate for a phone. Ellen dials 911 and Nancy applies compression to a boy's bleeding while they wait for the ambulance.

Later that night, Ellen hugs Nancy and whispers 'I love you', suggesting she is happy to have her in the couple's life despite the DNA results. But Nancy panics and leaves in the night while the couple sleep.

== Cast ==
- Andrea Riseborough as Nancy Freeman
- Ann Dowd as Betty Freeman
- J. Smith-Cameron as Ellen Lynch
- Steve Buscemi as Leo Lynch
- John Leguizamo as Jeb
- T. Sahara Meer as Beth
- Virginia Kull as Deb
- Samrat Chakrabarti as Raj
- Olli Haaskivi as Dr. Waters
- Tibor Feldman as Funeral Director
- René Ifrah as Jake
- Owen Campbell as Jordan

== Production ==
Christina Choe first announced Nancy in May 2015. It was inspired by films such as Barbara Loden's Wanda (1970), with Choe recalling:

That was the first time I had seen a female anti-hero character who was morally ambiguous, and making bad choices, and I remember it making me feel uncomfortable. I judged the character in a way that I don't think I would have done if it was a male anti-hero because I don't think I was used to seeing women on screen like that. That film was really pivotal for me and becomes more and more of a masterpiece each time I see it. It really inspired me to create a character like Nancy.

In February 2017, it was reported that Andrea Riseborough was set to star alongside J. Smith-Cameron, Ann Dowd, John Leguizamo, and Steve Buscemi in Nancy, marking Choe's feature directorial debut. Principal photography began in upstate New York with a crew consisting of all-female department heads. The producers were Amy Lo of Mental Pictures, Michelle Cameron, and Riseborough, who produced Nancy as the first film under her banner Mothersucker. Eon Productions' Barbara Broccoli and Michael G. Wilson, Gamechanger Films' Mynette Louie, and XS Media's Rachel Xiaowen Song served as executive producers.

== Release ==
Nancy had its world premiere at the Sundance Film Festival on January 20, 2018, and was then screened at several film festivals. In February 2018, Samuel Goldwyn Films acquired North American distribution rights to the film. It was released in select theaters in the United States on June 8, 2018.

== Reception ==
=== Box office ===
Nancy grossed $80,115 in the United States and Canada, and $11,885 in other territories, for a worldwide total of $92,000.

=== Critical response ===
On the review aggregator website Rotten Tomatoes, 86% of 64 critics' reviews are positive, with an average rating of 7.0/10. The website's consensus reads: "Nancy is an uncomfortable watch, but worth the effort thanks to Andrea Riseborough's central performance — and writer-director Christina Choe's powerful empathy for her character's dangerously misguided choices." Metacritic, which uses a weighted average, assigned the film a score of 67 out of 100, based on 17 critics, indicating "generally favorable" reviews.

Justin Chang of the Los Angeles Times described the film as "a character study that itself possesses the narrative economy and lingering resonance of a short story." Chang also noted, "Riseborough, a gifted British chameleon, tamps down the natural radiance she has evinced in movies such as Battle of the Sexes" and "Choe elicits wonderfully expressive, lived-in performances from Cameron and Buscemi."

Jeannette Catsoulis of The New York Times stated, "Nancy is so closed off we can't get a handle on her. What's left is a strange, sour tale that's neither origin mystery nor journey of self-discovery, but a vexing gesture toward damage and delusion that never permits us to peek under its broken heroine's hood."

Ann Hornaday of The Washington Post remarked, "Choe keeps the audience unsure of whether we're seeing a redemptive drama of self-discovery or a troubling portrait of severe decompensation. […] As the depiction of a ghost haunting her own life, Nancy possesses an alert, tense sense of atmosphere, but it winds up being as glum and inert as the protagonist herself."

Jon Frosch of The Hollywood Reporter opined, "The filmmaker never pulls us into the twists and turns of her main character's mind, and she tiptoes around, rather than tackles, her ideas about class envy, the performative nature of identity and the tension between truth and happiness."

Amy Nicholson of Variety criticized the film for being "just too miserable to encourage the audience to offer up our empathy, when it doesn't have affection for anything in it either." Nicholson also commented, "Nancy's restraint keeps the film closed-off and grim, as muddy gray as the life she's aching to ditch."

Dana Schwartz of Entertainment Weekly wrote, "It is not a thriller nor even, really, a mystery. Instead, much like a play, it forces you to pay attention to the nuances of each of the actors' (very well-done) performances, to sit with the characters quietly as if in a sitting room too formal to do much else."

David Edelstein of Vulture stated, "Nancy is a grim piece of work, but Choe's empathy for her protagonist gives the film its distinctive texture", and lauded Riseborough's performance, calling her "a true chameleon actress who seems to change color from the inside."

Glenn Kenny of RogerEbert.com gave the film 3.5 out of 4 stars and noted, "What the film is finally about is not whether or not Nancy will inflict damage, but whether these lonely people can receive true grace. In this respect and several others, Nancy exhibits a seriousness of purpose that's rare in American movies today."

Peter Bradshaw of The Guardian gave the film 3 out of 5 stars and opined, "Riseborough, Cameron and Buscemi are all good in difficult roles. […] Choe felt that such inventions would take her feature into Hitchcock territory and away from the more downbeat and realistic mode she started with. An interesting and worthwhile drama nonetheless."
