= Buster's Mal Heart =

- Theatrical release poster
- Directed by: Sarah Adina Smith
- Written by: Sarah Adina Smith
- Produced by: Travis Stevens; Jonako Donley
- Starring: Rami Malek; DJ Qualls; Kate Lyn Sheil
- Cinematography: Shaheen Seth
- Edited by: Sarah Adina Smith
- Music by: Mister Squinter
- Production companies: Everything is Everything; Gamechanger Films; Snowfort Pictures
- Distributed by: Well Go USA Entertainment
- Release dates: September 11, 2016 (TIFF); April 28, 2017 (United States)
- Running time: 96 minutes
- Country: United States
- Languages: English; Spanish
- Box office: $62,382

Buster's Mal Heart is a 2016 surrealist mystery film written, directed, and edited by Sarah Adina Smith. It stars Rami Malek, DJ Qualls, Kate Lyn Sheil, Lin Shaye, Toby Huss, Sukha Belle Potter, Lily Gladstone, and Nicholas Pryor.

The film had its world premiere at the Toronto International Film Festival on September 11, 2016. It was released on April 28, 2017, by Well Go USA Entertainment.

== Plot ==
An eccentric mountain man is on the run from the authorities, surviving the winter by breaking into empty vacation homes in a remote community. Regularly calling into radio talk shows — where he has acquired the nickname "Buster" — to rant about the impending inversion at the turn of the millennium, he is haunted by visions of being lost at sea, and memories of his former life as a family man.

Buster was once Jonah, a husband and father whose job as the night-shift concierge at a hotel took its toll on his psyche and, consequently, his marriage to Marty — until a chance encounter with conspiracy-obsessed drifter Brown changed the course of their lives forever. As the solitary present-day Buster drifts from house to house, eluding the local sheriff and law enforcement, the film portrays the events that fractured his life and left him alone on top of a snowy mountain, or in a small rowboat in the middle of an ocean, or both.

== Cast ==
- Rami Malek as Jonás "Jonah" Cueyatl, a hotel concierge turned mountain man who acquires the nickname Buster
- DJ Qualls as Brown, a computer engineer who self-identifies as "the Last Free Man"
- Kate Lyn Sheil as Marty Cueyatl, Jonah's wife
- Sukha Belle Potter as Roxy Cueyatl, Jonah and Marty's daughter
- Lin Shaye as Pauline, Marty's mother
- Toby Huss as Deputy Winston
- Mark Kelly as Oscar Cueyatl, Jonah's father
- Teresa Yenque as Adelita Cueyatl, Jonah's mother
- Bruce Bundy as Ranger Meg
- Jared Larson as Dale
- Sandra Ellis as Mrs. Bowery
- Nicholas Pryor as Mr. Bowery
- Lily Gladstone as Kelly, the morning shift concierge at the hotel
- Sandra Seacat as a public access psychic
- Ross Partridge as the psychic caller

== Production ==
After producing her first feature film The Midnight Swim, Smith knew that she wanted to create a story about a man and a mountain. She wrote the script at the Screenwriters Colony in Nantucket, MA. It was a non-traditional script, that combined illustrations with scene descriptions so that it almost read like a short story.

While finding financing came surprisingly easily for such an unusual script, the biggest challenge was finding someone to cast as the lead. Originally planning to cast a Latino actor due to the bilingual nature of the main character Jonah, Smith widened the search to expedite the casting process, eventually deciding on Rami Malek who she had seen in Short Term 12 and The Pacific. A tarot-card reading confirmed her casting choice.

Buster's Mal Heart was filmed near Glacier National Park and in Kalispell, MT, as well as on the ocean in open water. Originally, Smith planned to film in her home state of Colorado but, in the end, decided to shoot in Montana for the available state grant as well as the unique and dramatic landscape. The film was shot in 18 days.

== Release ==
Buster's Mal Heart premiered at the Toronto International Film Festival on September 11, 2016. The film had been offered a slot at the 2017 Sundance Film Festival, but the filmmakers opted to premiere earlier due to Rami Malek's schedule. Shortly after the film's Toronto premiere, Well Go USA Entertainment and Netflix acquired distribution rights to the film. The film went onto screen at the AFI Fest on November 11, 2016. and screened at the Tribeca Film Festival on April 26, 2017.

It was released on April 28, 2017.

=== Critical reception ===
Buster's Mal Heart received positive reviews from film critics. It holds a 70% approval rating on review aggregator website Rotten Tomatoes, based on 50 reviews, with an average score of 6.2/10. On Metacritic, the film holds a weighted average score of 63 out of 100 based on 15 critics, indicating "generally favorable" reviews.

John DeFore of The Hollywood Reporter gave the film a positive review, writing: "Fans of Mr. Robot won't be disappointed in the least by this vehicle for Emmy-winning series star Rami Malek, which both fits in with Mr. Robot's delusion-prone paranoia and lets the charismatic actor stretch out in his first feature lead." Jeanette Catsoulis of The New York Times also gave the film a positive review, writing: "If the story is too tricky to realize its themes or welcome the impatient, it also contains enough empathy to humanize a character who's part man, part spiritual symbol." Geoff Berkshire of Variety also gave the film a positive review, writing: "Whether he's playfully interacting with his wife and daughter, or delivering a madman's rant to thin air, Malek has the range to be utterly charming, utterly creepy, or both at once."
