= Bradley Rust Gray =

American filmmaker

Bradley Rust Gray (born 1971) is an American independent filmmaker known for The Exploding Girl and Jack & Diane. He made the film Salt in 2003. He is married to filmmaker So Yong Kim, with whom he has frequently collaborated on projects, including being screenwriter for Lovesong and In Between Days. He has served as editor for many of his and his spouse's works.

The Exploding Girl premiered at the Berlin International Film Festival in 2009 and was released theatrically in the United States on March 12, 2010.

== Filmmaking efforts ==
Gray and Kim are close collaborators — they produce each other's work and often write and edit together — and in interviews tend to use the first-person plural in discussing their movies.

Gray began in experimental film and moved toward narrative filmmaking while studying at the British Film Institute in London.

Gray has told interviewers that the strongest part of their collaboration is in the editing. He says he was influenced by Argentine writer Julio Cortázar, especially his folk tales and magical realisms.

Gray and Kim have titled several of their movies about songs, and Gray notes that singer John Mellencamp put out a statement relating to the title of the film Jack & Diane. Gray says "I didn't mean to cause him any offense."

Gray directed a segment for the 2019 anthology film 30/30 Vision: 3 Decades of Strand Releasing.

== Early life ==
Gray was born in Kettering, Ohio, and educated at the University of Southern California.

== Personal life ==
Gray and Kim met at the Art Institute of Chicago. They have two children.
