= Independent Spirit John Cassavetes Award =

Award for low-budget film productions

John Cassavetes Award
- Awarded for: Best creative team of a film budgeted at less than $1 million
- Presented by: Independent Spirit Awards
- First award: The Blair Witch Project (1999)
- Currently held by: Girls Will Be Girls (2024)
- Website: spiritawards.com

The Independent Spirit John Cassavetes Award is presented to the creative team of a film budgeted at less than $1 million by the Film Independent, a non-profit organization dedicated to independent film and independent filmmakers. It is named after actor/screenwriter/director John Cassavetes, a pioneer of American independent film. The award is given to the directors, writers and producers of a film.

== History ==
Created for the 15th Independent Spirit Awards, it was originally called the Independent Spirit Award for Best First Feature (Under $500,000). After that, the rules changed so that any feature film budgeted under $500,000 could be eligible (regardless of how many films the director has made), hence the new name. The first recipient of the award was the horror film The Blair Witch Project. In 2023, the rules changed to include any feature film budgeted under $1 million. At the 40th Independent Spirit Awards, it was jokingly referred to as the Gena Rowlands Award (after Cassavetes's wife who has passed away), although it continues to be officially known as the John Cassavetes Award.

== Winners and nominees ==
=== 1990s ===
Year	Film	Director(s)	Writer(s)	Producer(s)
1999	The Blair Witch Project	Daniel Myrick, Eduardo Sanchez		Gregg Hale, Robin Cowie
1999	La Ciudad	David Riker		David Riker, Paul S. Mezey
1999	Compensation	Zeinabu irene Davis	Marc Arthur Chery	Marc Arthur Chery, Zeinabu Irene Davis
1999	Judy Berlin	Eric Mendelsohn		Rocco Caruso
1999	Treasure Island	Scott King		Adrienne Gruben

=== 2000s ===
Year	Film	Director(s)	Writer(s)	Producer(s)
2000	Chuck & Buck	Miguel Arteta	Mike White	Matthew Greenfield
2000	Bunny	Mia Trachinger		Rebecca Sonnenshine, Mia Trachinger
2000	Everything Put Together	Marc Forster	Marc Forster, Adam Forgash, Catherine Lloyd Burns	Sean Furst
2000	Groove	Greg Harrison		Danielle Renfrew
2000	Our Song	Jim McKay		Jim McKay, Paul S. Mezey, Diana E. Williams
2001	Jackpot	Michael Polish	Michael Polish, Mark Polish	
2001	Acts of Worship	Rosemary Rodriguez		Nadia Leonelli, Fredrick Sundwall, Rosemary Rodriguez
2001	Kaaterskill Falls	Josh Apter, Peter Olsen		
2001	Punks	Patrik-Ian Polk		Patrik-Ian Polk, Tracey E. Edmonds, Michael McQuarn
2001	Virgil Bliss	Joe Maggio		Joe Maggio, John Maggio
2002	Personal Velocity	Rebecca Miller		Lemore Syvan, Alexis Alexanian, Gary Winick
2002	Charlotte Sometimes	Eric Byler		Marc Ambrose, Eric Byler
2002	Dahmer	David Jacobson		Larry Rattner
2002	ivans xtc.	Bernard Rose	Lisa Enos, Bernard Rose	Lisa Enos
2002	The Slaughter Rule	Alex Smith, Andrew J. Smith		Gregory O'Connor, Michael Robinson
2003	The Station Agent	Tom McCarthy		Mary Jane Skalski, Robert May, Kathryn Tucker
2003	Anne B. Real	Lisa France	Lisa France, Antonio Macia	Luis Moro, Jeanine Rohn, Josselyne Herman Saccio
2003	Better Luck Tomorrow	Justin Lin	Ernesto M. Foronda, Justin Lin, Fabian Marquez	Julie Asato, Justin Lin, Ernesto M. Foronda
2003	Pieces of April	Peter Hedges		Alexis Alexanian, John S. Lyons, Gary Winick
2003	Virgin	Deborah Kampmeier		Sarah Schenck
2004	Mean Creek	Jacob Aaron Estes		Hagai Shaham, Rick Rosenthal, Susan Johnson
2004	Down to the Bone	Debra Granik	Debra Granik, Richard Lieske	Susan Leber, Anne Rosellini
2004	On the Outs	Lori Silverbush, Michael Skolnik	Lori Silverbush	Lori Silverbush, Michael Skolnik
2004	Robbing Peter	Mario F. de la Vega		T. Todd Flinchum, Lisa Y. Garibay, Mario F. de la Vega
2004	Unknown Soldier	Ferenc Toth		Sean Bachrodt, Seth Eisman, Chachi Senior, Ferenc Totho
2005	Conventioneers	Mora Stephens	Mora Stephens, Joel Viertel	Joel Viertel
2005	Brick	Rian Johnson		Ram Bergman, Mark G. Mathis
2005	Jellysmoke	Mark Banning		Mark Banning, Cliff Charles, Mad Matthewz
2005	The Puffy Chair	Jay Duplass	Jay Duplass, Mark Duplass	Mark Duplass
2005	Room	Kyle Henry		Allen Bain, Darren Goldberg, Jesse Scolaro
2006	Quinceañera	Richard Glatzer, Wash Westmoreland		Anne Clements
2006	12 and Holding	Michael Cuesta	Anthony Cipriano	Leslie Urdang, Michael Cuesta, Brian Bell, Jenny Schweitzer
2006	Chalk	Mike Akel	Chris Mass, Maike Akel	Mike Akel, Angela Alvarez, Graham Davidson, Chris Mass
2006	Four Eyed Monsters	Arin Crumley, Susan Buice		
2006	Old Joy	Kelly Reichardt	Jonathan Raymond, Kelly Reichardt	Lars Knudsen, Jay Van Hoy, Anish Savjani, Neil Kopp
2007	August Evening	Chris Eska		Connie Hill, Jason Wehling
2007	Owl and the Sparrow	Stephane Gauger		Nguyen Van Quan, Doan Nhat Nam, Stephane Gauger
2007	The Pool	Chris Smith	Chris Smith, Randy Russell	Kate Noble
2007	Quiet City	Aaron Katz	Aaron Katz, Erin Fisher, Cris Lankenau	Brendan McFadden, Ben Stambler
2007	Shotgun Stories	Jeff Nichols		David Gordon Green, Lisa Muskat, Jeff Nichols
2008	In Search of a Midnight Kiss	Alex Holdridge		Seth Caplan, Scoot McNairy
2008	Prince of Broadway	Sean Baker	Sean Baker, Darren Dean	Darren Dean
2008	The Signal	David Bruckner, Dan Bush, Jacob Gentry		Jacob Gentry, Alexander Motlagh
2008	Take Out	Sean Baker, Shih-Ching Tsou		
2008	Turn the River	Chris Eigeman		Ami Armstrong
2009	Humpday	Lynn Shelton		
2009	Big Fan	Robert D. Siegel		Jean Kouremetis, Elan Bogarin
2009	The New Year Parade	Tom Quinn		Steve Beal, Tom Quinn
2009	Treeless Mountain	So Yong Kim		Bradley Rust Gray, Ben Howe, Lars Knudsen, Jay Van Hoy, So Yong Kim
2009	Zero Bridge	Tariq Tapa		Hilal Ahmed Langoo, Josée Lajoie, Tariq Tapa

=== 2010s ===
Year	Film	Director(s)	Writer(s)	Producer(s)
2010	Daddy Longlegs	Ben Safdie and Joshua Safdie		Casey Neistat, Tom Scott
2010	The Exploding Girl	Bradley Rust Gray		Karin Chien, Ben Howe, So Yong Kim
2010	Lbs.	Matthew Bonifacio		Matthew Bonifacio, Carmine Famiglietti
2010	Lovers of Hate	Bryan Poyser		Megan Gilbride
2010	Obselidia	Diane Bell		Chris Byrne, Matthew Medlin
2011	Pariah	Dee Rees		Nekisa Cooper
2011	Bellflower	Evan Glodell		Vincent Grashaw, Evan Glodell
2011	Circumstance	Maryam Keshavarz		Karin Chien, Maryam Keshavarz, Melissa Lee
2011	The Dynamiter	Matthew Gordon	Brad Ingelsby	Kevin Abrams, Matthew Gordon, Merrilee Holt, Art Jones, Mike Jones, Nate Tuck, Amile Wilson
2011	Hello Lonesome	Adam Reid		
2012	Middle of Nowhere	Ava DuVernay		Paul Garnes, Howard Barish, Ava DuVernay
2012	Breakfast with Curtis	Laura Colella		
2012	Mosquita y Mari	Aurora Guerrero		Chad Burris
2012	The Color Wheel	Alex Ross Perry	Alex Ross Perry, Carlen Altman	Alex Ross Perry
2012	Starlet	Sean Baker	Chris Bergoch, Sean Baker	Blake Ashman-Kipervaser, Kevin Chinoy, Patrick Cunningham, Chris Maybach, Francesca Silvestri
2013	This Is Martin Bonner	Chad Hartigan		Cherie Saulter
2013	Computer Chess	Andrew Bujalski		Houston King, Alex Lipschultz
2013	Crystal Fairy & the Magical Cactus	Sebastián Silva		Juan de Dios Larraín, Pablo Larraín
2013	Museum Hours	Jem Cohen		Paolo Calamita, Gabriele Kranzelbinder
2013	Pit Stop	Yen Tan	Yen Tan, David Lowery	Jonathan Duffy, James M. Johnston, Eric Steele, Kelly Williams
2014	Land Ho!	Aaron Katz, Martha Stephens		Christina Jennings, Mynette Louie, Sara Murphy
2014	Blue Ruin	Jeremy Saulnier		Richard Peete, Vincent Savino, Anish Savjani
2014	It Felt Like Love	Eliza Hittman		Shrihari Sathe, Laura Wagner, Eliza Hittman
2014	Man from Reno	Dave Boyle	Dave Boyle, Joel Clark, Michael Lerman	Ko Mori
2014	Test	Chris Mason Johnson		Chris Martin
2015	Krisha	Trey Edward Shults		Trey Edward Shults, Justin R. Chan, Chase Joliet, and Wilson Smith
2015	Advantageous	Jennifer Phang	Jennifer Phang, Jacqueline Kim	Robert Chang, Ken Jeong, Moon Molson, Theresa Navarro, Jennifer Phang, Jacqueline Kim
2015	Christmas, Again	Charles Poekel		
2015	Heaven Knows What	Benny Safdie and Josh Safdie	Ronald Bronstein, Josh Safdie	Oscar Boyson, Sebastian Bear McClard
2015	Out of My Hand	Takeshi Fukunaga	Donari Braxton, Takeshi Fukunaga	Donari Braxton, Mike Fox
2016	Spa Night	Andrew Ahn		David Ariniello, Giulia Caruso, Ki Jin Kim, Kelly Thomas
2016	Free in Deed	Jake Mahaffy		Mike Bowes, Mike S. Ryan, Brent Stiefel
2016	Hunter Gatherer	Josh Locy		Michael Covino, April Lamb, Sara Murphy, Isaiah Smallman
2016	Lovesong	So Yong Kim	Bradley Rust Gray, So Yong Kim	David Hansen, Bradley Rust Gray, Alex Lipschultz, Johnny Mac
2016	Nakom	Kelly Daniela Norris, T. W. Pittman	Kelly Daniela Norris, Isaac Adakudugu	Giovanni Ximėnez, Kelly Daniela Norris, T. W. Pittman, Isaac Adakudugu
2017	Life and Nothing More	Antonio Méndez Esparza		Amadeo Hernández Bueno, Alvaro Portanet Hernández, Pedro Hernández Santos
2017	Dayveon	Amman Abbasi	Steven Reneau, Amman Abbasi	Lachion Buckingham, Alexander Uhlmann, Amman Abbasi
2017	A Ghost Story	David Lowery		Adam Donaghey, Toby Halbrooks, James M. Johnston
2017	Most Beautiful Island	Ana Asensio		Ana Asensio, Larry Fessenden, Noah Greenberg, Chadd Harbold, Jenn Wexler
2017	The Transfiguration	Michael O'Shea		Susan Leber
2018	En el séptimo día	Jim McKay		Alex Bach, Jim McKay, Lindsey Cordero, Caroline Kaplan, Michael Stipe
2018	A Bread Factory	Patrick Wang		Daryl Freimark, Patrick Wang, Matt Miller
2018	Never Goin' Back	Augustine Frizzell		Liz Cardenas, Toby Halbrooks, James M. Johnston
2018	Sócrates	Alexandre Moratto	Alexandre Moratto, Thayná Mantesso	Ramin Bahrani, Alexandre Moratto, Jefferson Paulino, Tammy Weiss
2018	Thunder Road	Jim Cummings		Natalie Metzger, Zack Parker, Benjamin Weissner
2019	Give Me Liberty	Kirill Mikhanovsky	Alice Austen, Kirill Mikhanovsky	Val Abel, Wally Hall, Kirill Mikhanovsky, Alice Austen, Michael Manasseri, George Rush, Sergey Shtern
2019	Burning Cane	Phillip Youmans		Phillip Youmans, Ojo Akinlana, Jakob Johnson, Karen Kaia Livers, Mose Mayer, Wendell Pierce, Isaac Webb, Cassandra Youmans
2019	Colewell	Tom Quinn		Tom Quinn, Joshua Blum, Alexandra Byer, Craig Shilowich, Matthew Thurm
2019	Premature	Rashaad Ernesto Green	Rashaad Ernesto Green, Zora Howard	Darren Dean, Joy Ganes, Rashaad Ernesto Green
2019	Wild Nights with Emily	Madeleine Olnek		Madeleine Olnek, Anna Margarita Albelo, Casper Andreas, Max Rifkind-Barron

=== 2020s ===
Year	Film	Director(s)	Writer(s)	Producer(s)
2020	Residue	Merawi Gerima		
2020	The Killing of Two Lovers	Robert Machoian		Robert Machoian, Scott Christopherson, Clayne Crawford
2020	La Leyenda Negra	Patricia Vidal Delgado		Alicia Herder, Marcel Perez
2020	Lingua Franca	Isabel Sandoval		Isabel Sandoval, Darlene Catly Malimas, Jhett Tolentino, Carlo Velayo, Dax Stringer
2020	Saint Frances	Alex Thompson	Kelly O'Sullivan	Alex Thompson, James Choi, Pierce Cravens, Ian Keiser, Eddie Linker, Raphael Nash, Roger Welp
2021	Shiva Baby	Emma Seligman		Emma Seligman, Kieran Altmann, Katie Schiller, Lizzie Shapiro
2021	Cryptozoo	Dash Shaw		Tyler Davidson, Kyle Martin, Jane Samborski, Bill Way
2021	Jockey	Clint Bentley	Clint Bentley, Greg Kwedar	Clint Bentley, Nancy Schafer, Greg Kwedar
2021	Sweet Thing	Alexandre Rockwell		Louis Anania, Haley Anderson, Kenan Baysal
2021	This Is Not a War Story	Talia Lugacy		Noah Lang, Julian West Margarita Albelo, Talia Lugacy, Casper Andreas, Max Rifkind-Barron
2022	The Cathedral	Ricky D'Ambrose		Graham Swon
2022	The African Desperate	Martine Syms	Martine Syms, Rocket Caleshu	Martine Syms, Rocket Caleshu, Vic Brooks
2022	Holy Emy	Araceli Lemos	Araceli Lemos, Giulia Caruso	Giulia Caruso, Mathieu Bompoint, Ki Jin Kim, Konstantinos Vassilaros
2022	A Love Song	Max Walker-Silverman		Max Walker-Silverman, Jesse Hope, Dan Janvey
2022	Something in the Dirt	Justin Benson, Aaron Moorhead	Justin Benson	Justin Benson, Aaron Moorhead, David Lawson Jr.
2023	Fremont	Babak Jalali	Babak Jalali, Carolina Cavalli	Rachael Fung, Chris Martin, Marjaneh Moghimi, George Rush, Sudnya Shroff, Laura Wagner
2023	The Artifice Girl	Franklin Ritch		Aaron B. Koontz, Ashleigh Snead
2023	Cadejo Blanco	Justin Lerner		Mauricio Escobar, Ryan Friedkin, Jack Patrick Hurley
2023	Rotting in the Sun	Sebastian Silva	Sebastian Silva, Pedro Peirano	Jacob Wasserman
2023	The Unknown Country	Morrisa Maltz	Morrisa Maltz, Lily Gladstone, Lainey Bearkiller Shangreaux, Vanara Taing	Lainey Bearkiller Shangreaux, Vanara Taing, Katherine Harper, Laura Heberton, Tommy Heitkamp
2024	Girls Will Be Girls	Shuchi Talati		Richa Chadha, Claire Chassagne, Shuchi Talati
2024	Big Boys	Corey Sherman		Corey Sherman, Allison Tate
2024	Ghostlight	Kelly O'Sullivan, Alex Thompson	Kelly O'Sullivan	Pierce Cravens, Ian Keiser, Chelsea Krant, Eddie Linker, Alex Thompson
2024	Jazzy	Morrisa Maltz	Morrisa Maltz, Lainey Bearkiller Shangreaux, Andrew Hajek, Vanara Taing	Miranda Bailey, Lainey Bearkiller Shangreaux, Tommy Heitkamp, Morrisa Maltz, John Way, Natalie Whalen, Elliott Whitton
2024	The People's Joker	Vera Drew	Bri LeRose, Vera Drew	Joey Lyons
2025	The Baltimorons	Jay Duplass	Jay Duplass, Michael Strassner	David Bonnett Jr., Jay Duplass, Drew Langer, Michael Strassner
2025	Boys Go to Jupiter	Julian Glander		
2025	Eephus	Carson Lund	Carson Lund, Michael Basta, Nate Fisher	Carson Lund, Michael Basta,David Entin, Tyler Taormina
2025	Esta Isla (This Island)	Cristian Carretero, Lorraine Jones Molina	Cristian Carretero, Lorraine Jones Molina, Kisha Tikina Burgos	Cristian Carretero, Lorraine Jones Molina
2025	Familiar Touch	Sarah Friedland		Sarah Friedland, Alexandra Byer, Matthew Thurm

== Multiple nominees ==
- Sean Baker - 3 (no wins)
- So Yong Kim - 3 (no wins)
- Bradley Rust Gray - 3 (no wins)
- George Rush - 2 (two wins)
- Laura Wagner - 2 (one win)
- Jim McKay - 2 (one win)
- Aaron Katz - 2 (one win)
- Gary Winick - 2 (one win)
- Giulia Caruso - 2 (one win)
- Ki Jin Kim - 2 (one win)
- Jay Duplass - 2 (no wins)
- Jay Van Hoy - 2 (no wins)
- Lars Knudsen - 2 (no wins)
- Karin Chien - 2 (no wins)
- Ben Howe - 2 (no wins)
- Darren Dean - 2 (no wins)
- Josh Safdie, Benny Safdie - 3 (one win)
