= Japan Cuts =

Annual film festival in New York City

JAPAN CUTS: Festival of New Japanese Film
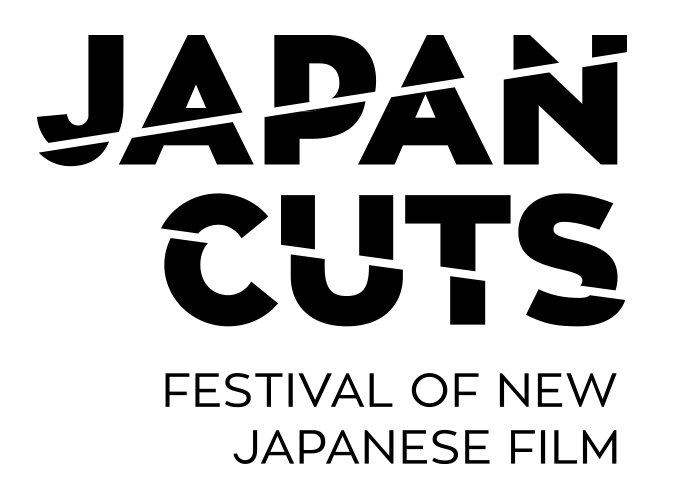
- Location: Japan Society, New York City, United States
- Founded: 2007
- Language: Japanese, English
- Website: http://www.japansociety.org/japancuts

JAPAN CUTS: Festival of New Japanese Film is an annual festival of modern Japanese cinema presented by New York City's Japan Society. The festival was first held in 2007, growing out of the Japan Society's popular bi-annual series, New Films from Japan. But where New Films from Japan was a series that showed, on average, ten films over the course of several months, the JAPAN CUTS festival has scheduled an average of 25-30 films, many of them premieres, over two weeks during the month of July. Screenings are held in Japan Society's 260-seat Lila Acheson Wallace Auditorium.

== History ==
The year 2007 marked not only the launch of JAPAN CUTS, but also the first time Japan Society's film department teamed with the New York Asian Film Festival (NYAFF). The first festival screened 15 films from July 5–15, 2007, with six co-presentation screenings with NYAFF. The 2007 JAPAN CUTS also featured a special night showcasing Japanese video art courtesy of Frankfurt, Germany's Nippon Connection, as well as a special night of short films and networking lounge for New York and Japan-based filmmakers. Directors Shusuke Kaneko, Miwa Nishikawa, Naoko Ogigami, and Sion Sono appeared at the festival for a discussion about their films.

The following year, JAPAN CUTS screened 18 films, nine of them co-presentations with NYAFF. The festival also continued its partnership with Nippon Connection and presented over sixty screenings of short films and video art by independent Japanese filmmakers. Filmmakers Naomi Kawase, Kōji Wakamatsu, Masayuki Kakegawa, and Takako Matsumoto appeared as special guests at the festival for audience Q&A sessions. This was also the first year after-screening parties, something that is now a common occurrence at Japan Society film screenings, were held.

The 2009 festival saw the slate of film screenings increase by ten films, with twelve screenings being co-presentation's with NYAFF. However, JAPAN CUTS jettisoned screenings of short films and art videos presented in conjunction with Nippon Connection. Special guests included Sion Sono, Eiji Okuda, Momoko Mieda, Gen Takahashi, and Kazuyoshi Kumakiri.

In 2010, JAPAN CUTS scaled back the number of films screened, but increased the number of screenings. Over twenty films screened in thirty screenings, 8 films were co-presented with New York Asian Film Festival. Coming at the end of the decade, the 2010 incarnation of JAPAN CUTS included a small, sub-series of films that had gone unreleased in the United States until their screenings at Japan Society. Special guests included Toshiaki Toyoda, Yoshihiro Nishimura, Noboru Iguchi, Toshiaki Toyoda, Isao Yukisada, Tatsuya Fujiwara, Tomorowo Taguchi, Daichi Watanabe, and Hitoshi Yazaki.

The 2011, JAPAN CUTS adopted a new name, JAPAN CUTS: The New York Festival of Contemporary Japanese Cinema. Thirty-two films screened over the course of thirty-three screenings, ten of which were co-presented with NYAFF. The series began on July 7 and finished on July 22. Screenings included the New York premiere of Haru's Journey, starring Tatsuya Nakadai, the world premiere of Takashi Miike's Ninja Kids!!!, and a special screening of Kinji Fukasaku's Battle Royale. Eight special guests attended the festival, including directors Masashi Yamamoto, Tak Sakaguchi, Yudai Yamaguchi and Yoshimasa Ishibashi and actress Sora Aoi.

In 2012, the festival increased in scope and scale, screening 39 films. 12 films were co-presented with NYAFF. The series began on July 12 and concluded on July 28. The opening film was the U.S. premiere of Hitoshi One's Love Strikes!, centerpiece presentation the New York premiere of Shuichi Okita's The Woodsman and the Rain, and closing film the North American premiere of Takashi Yamazaki’s Space Battleship Yamato. 8 special guests attended, including Toshi Fujiwara, Yu Irie, Kenji Kohashi, Hisako Matsui, Masami Nagasawa, Naoko Ogigami, Toshiaki Toyoda, Koji Yakusho (recipient of the CUT ABOVE Award for Excellence in Film).

The 2013 edition scaled back to 24 films, with independent productions and big budget epics. JAPAN CUTS again dovetailed with NYAFF, co-presenting 12 titles. The series began on July 11 and concluded July 21. The festival’s opening film was the U.S. premiere of Toshiaki Toyoda’s I’M FLASH!, with the closing film the U.S. Premiere of Shinji Higuchi and Isshin Inudo’s The Floating Castle. 5 special guests attended, including Junichi Inoue, Justin Leach, Regge Life, Yukihiro Toda, and Toyoda.

JAPAN CUTS 2014 increased the number of films in the lineup to 28, further diversifying genre and including more transnational productions, such as Dave Boyle’s Japanese-American Man from Reno and the Mo Brothers’ Indonesian-Japanese Killers. 13 films were co-presented with NYAFF. The series began on July 10 and concluded July 20. The festival's opening film was the U.S. premiere of Takashi Miike's The Mole Song: Undercover Agent Reiji, the centerpiece presentation the world premiere of Momoko Ando's 0.5mm, and the closing film the North American premiere of Tetsuichiro Tsuta's The Tale of Iya. 8 special guests attended, including Ando, Boyle, Kazuki Kitamura (recipient of the CUT ABOVE Award for Excellence in Film), Shiro Maeda, Fumi Nikaido, Ken Ochiai, Tsuta, and Chihiro Yamamoto.

The 2015 edition of JAPAN CUTS broadened its programming to encompass narrative features, documentaries, avant-garde, and restored and rediscovered works, establishing the Feature Slate, Documentary Focus, Experimental Spotlight, and Classics sections. The festival presented 28 features and dozens of shorts, beginning July 9 and concluding July 19. The festival's opening film was the North American premiere of Yu Irie's HIBI ROCK, the centerpiece presentation the North American premieres of Shingo Wakagi's Asleep and Masaharu Take's 100 Yen Love, and closing film the international premiere of Juichiro Yamasaki's Sanchu Uprising: Voices at Dawn. 17 special guests attended, including Sakura Ando (recipient of the CUT ABOVE Award for Outstanding Performance in Film), Haruhiko Arai, Bishop Blay, Donari Braxton, Steve Cossman, Takeshi Fukunaga, Irie, Youki Kudoh, Hirotaka Kuwahara, Akiko Maruyama, Hisako Matsui, Tomonari Nishikawa, Joel Schlemowitz, Yuki Tanada, Masashi Yamamoto, Yamasaki, and Ted Wiggin.

In 2016, JAPAN CUTS celebrated its tenth anniversary with its most diverse and expansive program to date across the Feature Slate, Documentary Focus, Experimental Spotlight, and Classics sections, in addition to a Microcinema installed at Japan Society featuring short films by up and coming directors. The festival presented 29 features and 41 shorts, beginning July 14 and concluding July 24. The festival's opening film was the North American Premiere of Shuichi Okita's Mohican Comes Home, the centerpiece presentation was the North American premiere of Yoshifumi Tsubota's The Shell Collector, and closing film the North American Premiere of Satoko Yokohama's The Actor. Over 20 special guests attended (the most in the festival's history), including Denden, Lily Franky (recipient of the CUT ABOVE Award for Outstanding Performance in Film), Takashi Itani, Atsuko Maeda, Mizuki Misumi, Tatsuya Mori, Mipo O, Okita, Hitoshi One, Onohana, Emmanuel Osei-Kuffour, Jr., Ryuichi Sakamoto, Tsubota, Adam Torel, Eiji Uchida, Kensaku Watanabe, and Yokohama. Masao Adachi, Emi Meyer, Sion Sono provided video introductions, and Keiko Araki, Kazuhiro Soda, and Alexander Zahlten participated in a special industry panel. Highlighting “the strength and diversity of the festival's programming” MUBI presented a selection of previous JAPAN CUTS favorites online.

JAPAN CUTS’ 2017 edition presented a dynamic program of titles across the Feature Slate, Documentary Focus, Experimental Spotlight, and Classics sections, in addition to a newly established Shorts Showcase with narrative works. This eleventh edition of the festival presented 28 features and 6 short films, beginning July 13 and concluding July 23. The festival's opening film was the U.S. Premiere of MUMON: The Land of Stealth, the centerpiece presentation the East Coast Premiere of Over the Fence, and closing film the East Coast Premiere of In This Corner of the World. Special guests included Konrad Aderer (Resistance at Tule Lake), Sora Hokimoto (Haruneko), Hanae Kan (Yamato (California), West North West), Taro Maki (In This Corner of the World), Shingo Matsumura (Love and Goodbye and Hawaii), Kyoko Miyake (Tokyo Idols), Daisuke Miyazaki (Yamato (California)), Yoshihiro Nakamura (MUMON: The Land of Stealth), Joe Odagiri (Over the Fence, FOUJITA, recipient of the CUT ABOVE Award for Outstanding Performance in Film), Sahel Rosa (West North West), and Megumi Sasaki (A Whale of a Tale).

The 2018 edition of JAPAN CUTS includes titles across the Feature Slate, Documentary Focus, Experimental Spotlight, and Classics sections, in addition to a variety of pre-feature short films. The twelfth edition of the festival presents 28 features and 9 short films, beginning July 19 and concluding July 29. The festival's opening film is the North American Premiere of Ramen Shop, the centerpiece presentation the North American Premiere of Mori, The Artist’s Habitat, and closing film the U.S. Premiere of Hanagatami. Special guests include Akio Fujimoto (Passage of Life), Kazuo Hara (Sennan Asbestos Disaster), Moët Hayami (KUSHINA, what will you be), Tomona Hirota (KUSHINA, what will you be, YEAH), Eric Khoo (Ramen Shop), Kirin Kiki (Mori, The Artist's Habitat, Still Walking, recipient of the CUT ABOVE Award for Outstanding Performance in Film), Kazuyuki Kitaki (Dream of Illumination), Sachiko Kobayashi (Sennan Asbestos Disaster), Shunsuke Kubozuka (Hanagatami), Kaori Oda (Toward a Common Tenderness), Takumi Saitoh (blank 13, Ramen Shop), Shinsuke Sato (BLEACH), Thunder Sawada (Dream of Illumination), Yohei Suzuki (YEAH), Yuya Takagawa (Dream of Illumination), Hikaru Toda (Of Love & Law), Yôko Yamanaka (Amiko), Elisa Yanagi (YEAH), Keisuke Yoshida (Thicker Than Water), and Nao Yoshigai (Across the Water, Breathing House, Stories floating on the wind).

== Staff ==
JAPAN CUTS was founded in 2007 by Japan Society's Artistic Director Yoko Shioya with Film Program Officer Ryo Nagasawa, and programmed by Nagasawa through 2009. From 2010 to 2013, it was programmed by Samuel Jamier, Senior Film Program Officer, organized with Fumiko Miyamoto, Program Officer, Policy Projects & Film Program. From 2013, Aiko Masubuchi serves as Senior Film Programmer, with Kazu Watanabe as Film Programmer, and Joel Neville Anderson as JAPAN CUTS Programmer.

== See also ==
- Asian cinema
- Cinema of Japan
