= The Very Thought of You (disambiguation) =

"The Very Thought of You" is a pop standard published in 1934, music and lyrics by Ray Noble.

The Very Thought of You may also refer to:

- The Very Thought of You (film), a 1944 film starring Dennis Morgan and Eleanor Parker
- The Very Thought of You (1998 film) or Martha, Meet Frank, Daniel and Laurence, a British romantic comedy
- The Very Thought of You (Emilie-Claire Barlow album), 2007
- The Very Thought of You (Nat King Cole album), 1958
- The Very Thought of You (Ricky Nelson album), 1964
- The Very Thought of You, an album by Della Griffin
- The Very Thought of You (novel), a 2009 novel by Rosie Alison
- The Very Thought of You, a novel by Lynn Kurland
- The Very Thought of You, 1999 album by Norma Waterson
