= Sam Adegoke =

Nigerian-American actor

- Born: Samuel Oluwaseyi Adegoke; Lagos, Nigeria
- Education: University of Minnesota
- Occupation: Actor
- Years active: 2014–present

Samuel Oluwaseyi Adegoke is a Nigerian-American actor known for playing Jeff Colby in the Dynasty reboot series.

== Personal life ==
Adegoke was born in Lagos, Nigeria, but raised in Minneapolis, Minnesota and St. Paul, Minnesota. His parents were missionary ministers and came to the United States when he was a young child. He is the youngest of seven children. Adegoke studied marketing and finance at the University of Minnesota, and was president of the Black Student Union, vice-president of his fraternity, and served in student government.

In 2015, after a two-week nationwide search that garnered more than 7,000 submissions, Adegoke was named the winner of the third annual ABC Discovers: Digital Talent Competition. Adegoke lives in Los Angeles.

== Career ==
On January 30, 2017, Adegoke was cast as a lead in the Lifetime biopic Michael Jackson: Searching for Neverland playing Michael Jackson's bodyguard Javon Beard. Adegoke also recurred on Murder in the First and had guest spots on Code Black and NCIS: Los Angeles.

In February 2017, he was cast as Jeff Colby in a Dynasty reboot for The CW, which premiered in October 2017. Adegoke pitched the idea to showrunner Sallie Patrick for his character to be Nigerian, who involved him in the casting of Hakeem Kae-Kazim as Cecil Colby, Jeff's father. This allowed for scenes to incorporate this lingual and cultural interaction, featuring both English and Yoruba language in the characters' dialogue.

In 2018, Adegoke was cast in 8000 Shots, an indie film written and directed by Talia Lugacy, and co-produced by Rosario Dawson. Adegoke was set to star as Will Larue, "a combat veteran who served in the Iraq war, who loses his friend and fellow vet to suicide, which resurrects his past and forces him to confront the fact that healing from war is not possible." The film was renamed This Is Not a War Story and was released in 2021.

In June 2023, Adegoke was cast in Dark Days & the Dawn, the latest film from This Is Not a War Story director Talia Lugacy. "I count This Is Not a War Story as one of the most impactful experiences of my life both as an actor and on a personal level," Adegoke said in a statement to Variety, "When Talia [Lugacy] told me she wanted to work hand-in-hand developing this film together, I didn't hesitate for even a second. Our mutual trust is unwavering and I believe this is just a second step in a long road of collaboration together."

In 2024, Adegoke was cast in a recurring role for the Peacock miniseries, Fight Night: The Million Dollar Heist.

== Filmography ==
=== Film ===
Year	Title	Role	Notes
2014	I'm Good	Bunie	Short film
2014	Find Your Instrument	Falu	Short film
2016	Melody	Slick	Short film
2019	The Drone	Detective Allen	
2021	This Is Not a War Story	Will LaRue	Co-executive producer
TBA	Dark Days & the Dawn		

=== Television ===
Year	Title	Role	Notes
2015	Wicked City	Graham Walker	Episode: "The Very Thought of You"
2016	Brooklyn Nine-Nine	Ship Photographer	Episode: "The Cruise"
2016	Criminal Minds: Beyond Borders	Hank Willis	Episode: "Denial"
2016	Murder in the First	Billy James	Recurring role; 5 episodes
2016	Code Black	Eric Hawkins	Episode: "Sleight of Hand"
2017	NCIS: LA	Junior Sancho	Episode: "Kulinda"
2017	Switched at Birth	Chris Walker	Recurring role; 6 episodes
2017	Michael Jackson: Searching for Neverland	Javon Beard	Television film
2017–22	Dynasty	Jeff Colby	Series regular
2024	Fight Night: The Million Dollar Heist	Emerson	Recurring role

=== Theatre ===
Year(s)	Title	Role	Location
2026	The Real Ivanov	Borkin	Lynn F. Angelson Theater
