= Val Abel =

American film producer (born 1969)

- Born: Russian: Валерий Анатольевич Абель; November 18, 1969 (age 56); Tashkent, USSR
- Occupation: film producer

Val Abel is a Russian–American film producer best known for the 2019 American comedy drama Give Me Liberty and an American drama War Pony, the 2022 winner of Caméra d'Or.

== Early life and education ==
Val Abel was born and raised in Tashkent, Uzbekistan (former USSR). He holds a bachelor's degree in philosophy and an MBA, both from the University of Wisconsin–Milwaukee.

== Career ==
Abel is a producer of Give Me Liberty, which received four Independent Spirit Award nominations, winning the John Cassavetes Award. He is a producer of War Pony, a 2022 American drama directed by Riley Keough and Gina Gammell. War Pony had its world premiere on May 21, 2022, at the 2022 Cannes Film Festival in the Un Certain Regard section, where it won the Caméra d'Or award for the best first feature.

Abel served as the Creative Director of the Bookberry chain of bookstores. He has been serving on the jury (from 2006) of the Big Book Award, Russia's largest literary award for best prose in Russian. Abel co-owns Veranda 32.05, a restaurant in Moscow Hermitage Garden. Abel's Tilda Food & Bar made the 2021 Michelin Guide Moscow List as one of the Bib Gourmand restaurants. Abel is a professional antiquarian, operating through his bookstore Abelbooks.

== Filmography ==
Producer

- Give Me Liberty (2019)
- War Pony (2022)

== Awards and nominations ==
Year	Association	Category	Nominated work	Result	Notes
2020	Independent Spirit Awards	John Cassavetes Award	Give Me Liberty	Won	
