= Alice Austin =

Alice Austin may refer to:

- Alice Constance Austin (1862–1955), American architect, city planner, radical feminist, socialist, designer and utopist
- Alice Austen (1866–1952), American photographer
- Alice Austen (writer), American playwright, screenwriter, producer, and novelist
