= Daisy Waterstone =

British actress (born 1994)

- Born: 13 June 1994 (age 32); Hammersmith, London, England
- Occupation: Actress
- Years active: 2014–present
- Known for: The Durrells
- Parents: Tim Waterstone (father); Rosie Alison (mother)

Daisy Waterstone (born 13 June 1994) is a British actress, best known for playing Margo Durrell in the ITV family drama The Durrells.

== Early life ==
Waterstone was born on 13 June 1994 in Hammersmith, London, one of eight children of Sir Tim Waterstone, founder of the Waterstones bookshop chain, and film director/ producer and novelist Rosie Alison. She attended Francis Holland School, Sloane Square.

Waterstone became a member of the National Youth Theatre when she was thirteen, and later took a one-year foundation course at the Cambridge School of Visual and Performing Arts before moving on to her acting career.

== Career ==
Waterstone started her professional career on stage at The Pleasance Theatre, Islington, as Lucy/Tootles in the original production of Peter Pan Goes Wrong, followed by playing Susanna Walcott at The Old Vic in Yaël Farber's production of The Crucible, and has also played Emma in Rules for Living at the Royal National Theatre.

In 2014 she appeared as Katie Bowman in two episodes of the TV series Silent Witness, as Beatrice in the TV miniseries And Then There Were None, and as Clare Leighton in Testament of Youth. In 2015 she had parts in Cyberbully, and Dark Was the Night.

From 2015 to 2019, Waterstone played the role of Margo Durrell, a main character in the family comedy drama series The Durrells, which ran for four series and twenty six episodes, finishing in May 2019. Following The Durrells her work includes Abigail in two episodes of The Capture in 2019, in a cast which included Holliday Grainger, Ron Perlman, Ben Miles, Nigel Lindsay, and Indira Varma. In 2022, she starred as Octavia Aldridge in four episodes of series 2, of Dalgliesh (2022), as Jacqueline Hill in The Long Shadow (2023), and as Fiona Carey in Prime Target (2025).

Also in 2025 she returned to the stage, co-starring as Loll in Dear Loll at Wilton's Music Hall, followed by tour. In March 2026 she once more plays Abigail in three episodes of Series 3 of BBCTV's The Capture.

== Filmography ==
=== Film ===
Year	Title	Role	Notes or ref
2014	Testament of Youth	Clare Leighton	
2015	Cyberbully	Tamara Mathis	
2015	Dark Was the Night	Vik	Short film
2018	La La Means I Love You	Lois	Short film
2018	The Time Tree	Kate	Short film
2018	The Eternal Moment	Elsa	Short film
2020	Indefinately	Tilly	Short film

=== Television ===
Year	Title	Role	Notes	Ref
2014	Silent Witness	Katie Bowman	Episode: "Fraternity" (2 parts)	
2015	And Then There Were None	Beatrice	1 episode	
2015–2019	The Durrells	Margo Durrell	26 episodes	
2019–2022	The Capture	Abigail	4 episodes	
2022	T.S. Eliot: Into 'The Waste Land'	The Hyacinth Girl	TV documentary	
2023	Dalgliesh	Octavia Aldridge	2 episodes	
2023	The Long Shadow	Jacqueline Hill	2 episodes	
2025	Prime Target	Fiona Carey	3 episodes	

=== Theatre ===
Year	Title	Role	Theatre	Ref
2013	Peter Pan Goes Wrong	Lucy/Tootles	The Pleasance Theatre	
2014	The Crucible	Susanna Walcott	The Old Vic	
2015	Rules for Living	Emma	The Royal National Theatre	
2016	Alligators	Genevieve	Hampstead Theatre	
