= En el séptimo día =

- Theatrical release poster
- Directed by: Jim McKay
- Written by: Jim McKay
- Produced by: Alex Bach; Lindsey Cordero; Caroline Kaplan; Jim McKay; Michael Stipe
- Starring: Fernando Cardona
- Cinematography: Charles Libin
- Edited by: Karim López
- Production company: C-Hundred Film
- Distributed by: The Cinema Guild
- Release dates: June 25, 2017 (BAMcinemaFest); June 8, 2018 (US)
- Running time: 92 minutes
- Country: United States
- Language: Spanish
- Box office: $79,887

En el séptimo día (English: On the Seventh Day) is a 2017 American Spanish-language independent drama film directed by Jim McKay. Set over the course of seven days, the film depicts a group of undocumented Mexican immigrants living in Sunset Park, Brooklyn, who form a soccer team.

The film premiered at BAMcinemaFest in Brooklyn in June 2017, and screened in the International Competition section at the Locarno Festival in August 2017. In February 2019, it won the John Cassavetes Award at the 34th Independent Spirit Awards.

== Plot ==
José, a bicycle delivery worker, leads a soccer team of undocumented immigrants from Puebla, Mexico. As the championship game approaches the coming Sunday, José's boss demands that he work that day for a private party.

== Cast ==
- Fernando Cardona as José
- Gilberto Jimenez as Elmer
- Abel Perez as Jesús
- Genoel Ramírez as Artemio
- Alfonso Velasquez as Felix
- Alejandro Huitzil as Nacho
- Gilberto Arenas as Alfonso
- Ricardo Gonzalez as Ricardo
- Eduardo Espinosa as Juan
- Ernesto Lucero as Baltasar
- Mathia Vargas as Lisa

== Production ==
McKay first conceived of the story in October 2001. The project was shelved for over a decade as McKay went on to direct Everyday People (2004), Angel Rodriguez (2005), and several television series until he resumed working on the film in 2015. The script was inspired in part by the book Mexican New York by Robert Smith, which studies a community of migrants from the state of Puebla, Mexico, to Sunset Park, Brooklyn. McKay said, "[I]nspired by this book, the idea that though we might live in the melting pot of New York City, we are often territorial, rarely venturing into or getting to know surrounding neighborhoods a stone's throw away, came into focus once again."

The main cast consisted entirely of non-professional actors who were Mexican immigrants, most of whom had come from Sunset Park. The casting process began in the summer of 2015 and lasted for seven months. Each actor was cast without determining which character in the script he would play, and the roles were finally assigned after a period of script reading and soccer practices. Filming took place over the course of 19 days in June and July 2016, in the neighborhoods of Sunset Park, Park Slope, and Gowanus.

== Reception ==
On the review aggregator website Rotten Tomatoes, 100% of 31 critics' reviews are positive. The website's consensus reads: "While realistically exploring the long and hard days of an immigrant community, On the Seventh Day still finds the spaces in between where joy and hope triumph." On Metacritic, the film has a score 87 out of 100, based on 14 critics, indicating "universal acclaim".
