= Nekisa Cooper =

American film producer

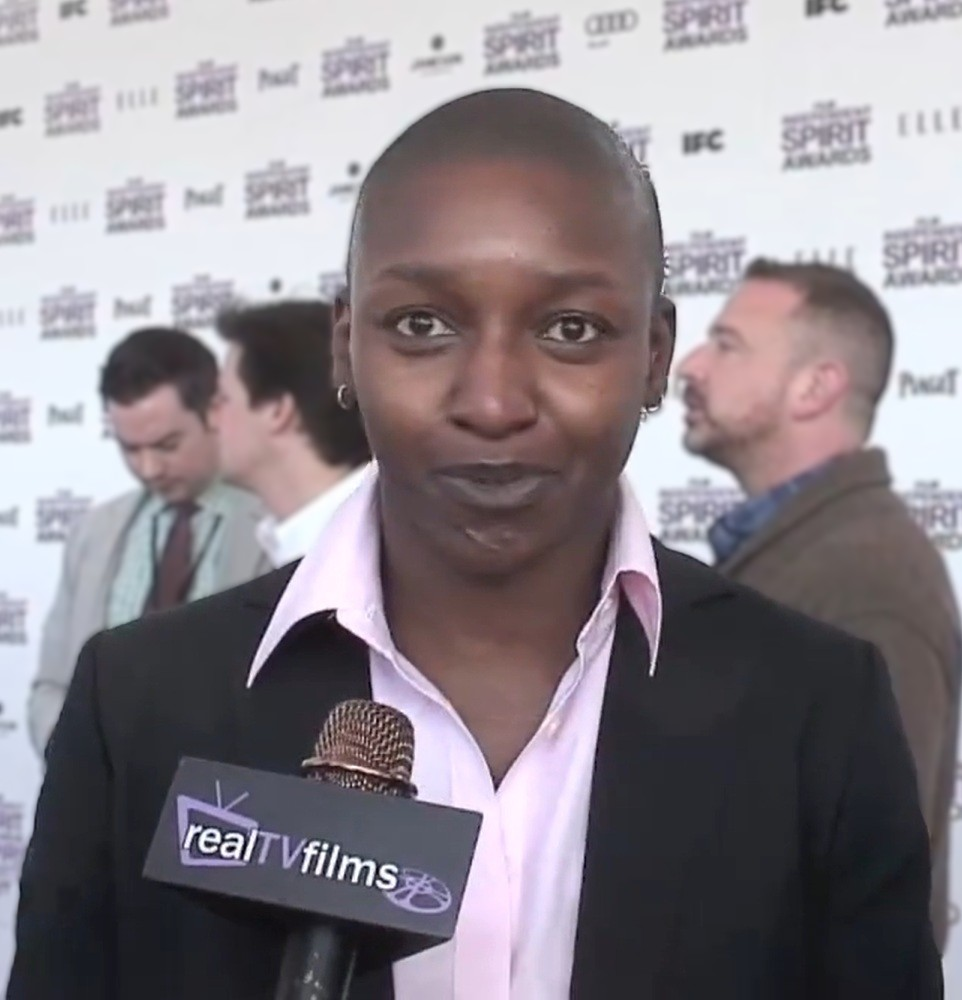
- Cooper in 2012
- Education: College of William & Mary (BA), Clark Atlanta University (MBA)
- Notable work: Pariah
- Title: film producer

Nekisa Cooper (born 1977 or 1978) is an American film producer. Cooper is best known for producing the 2011 film Pariah, directed by Dee Rees, and for her work as the vice president of Content at MasterClass.

== Education ==
Cooper received a BA from College of William & Mary and an MBA from Clark Atlanta University.

== Career ==
Following graduation, Cooper began her career as an assistant women's basketball coach at Christopher Newport University and the University of Richmond.

In 2005, Rees called Cooper to produce her thesis film, Pariah, a 27-minute drama depicting a girl in Brooklyn coming out as a lesbian. Cooper felt a deep connection to the story. In 2007, Cooper left the corporate sector and used her 401(k) savings to fund the film, which won the Audience Award at the Los Angeles Film Festival that same year.

In 2009, Cooper and Rees won the Iris Prize to produce a short film in Cardiff, Wales called Colonial Gods, which was critical to developing Pariah's visual aesthetic.

Nekisa supplemented her independent producing efforts by participating in multiple programs, such as Sundance Institute Creative Producing Lab, Film Independent’s Project Involve, The Rotterdam/Cinemart Producing Lab, The Gotham Film and Media Institutes (FKA IFP) IFP Market, The Transatlantic Producing Partners Program, and The Tribeca Film Institute’s All Access Program.

In 2011, Cooper produced Pariah, which centers on an African-American lesbian woman, and was marketed to a wider audience and branded as a coming-of-age tale with broad appeal. On December 1, 2011, the National Board of Review gave the film its Freedom of Expression Award. On June 29, 2021, Pariah became part of the Criterion Collection and earned a release of a special edition of the film on Blu-ray and includes behind the scenes on the making of the film. In 2022, the Library of Congress selected Pariah to the American National Film Registry, recognizing its cultural, historical, and aesthetic significance.

In 2014 Cooper joined MasterClass as lead freelance executive producer and in 2016, she became their first vice president of production then she served as the vice president of Content until 2023 where she oversaw the creation of the library with such instructors as Shonda Rhimes, Martin Scorsese, Sara Blakely, Neil Gaiman, Roxane Gay, Stephen Curry, Amy Tan, Walter Mosley, St. Vincent, Jon Kabat-Zinn, Malala Yousafzai, Tony Hawk and more.

In 2021, Cooper joined the Board of Directors of Chicken & Egg Pictures and served as vice president since January 2023. In December 2023, Cooper was appointed as the President of the Board of Directors for Chicken & Egg Pictures, a non-profit organization which provides funding and support to women and non-binary documentary filmmakers.

== Filmography ==
Year	Film	Notes
2005	Orange Bow	short - co-producer
2007	Pariah	short - producer
2008	Eventual Salvation	documentary - producer
2009	Ma cité, mon histoire	short - co-producer
2009	Colonial Gods	short - producer
2011	Pariah	producer
2014	Futurestates	TV series, 1 episode - producer
2016	The Ugly Doll (La muñeca fea)	documentary - producer

== Awards and recognitions ==
Year	Work	Award/Association	Category	Result	Refs
2007	Pariah (2007)	Chicago Gay and Lesbian International Film Festival	Best Narrative Short	Won	
2007	Pariah (2007)	Iris Prize Festival	Iris Prize	Won	
2007	Pariah (2007)	Los Angeles Film Festival	Audience Award – Best Short Film	Won	
2007	Pariah (2007)	Palm Springs International ShortFest	Future Filmmaker Award	Won	
2007	Pariah (2007)	Palm Springs International ShortFest	Best Live Action Over 15 Minutes	Won	
2007	Pariah (2007)	San Francisco International Lesbian & Gay Film Festival	Audience Award – Best Short	Won	
2007	Pariah (2007)	Urbanworld Film Festival	Best Narrative Short	Won	
2012	Pariah (2011)	Independent Spirit John Cassavetes Award	best feature made under $500,000	Won	
2012	Pariah (2011)	NAACP	Outstanding Motion Picture	Won	
2012	Pariah (2011)	GLAAD	Outstanding Feature Film	Won	
2012		Chicken & Egg Pictures Award	I BELIEVE IN YOU Creative Producing Award	Won	
2013		Fox Film Grant	Project Involve Fellowship	Won	
2015	Clyde's New York	New York Emmy Awards	Nostalgia Program	Won	
