= Kelly Daniela Norris =

American screenwriter

Kelly Daniela Norris is a Mexican-American film director, screenwriter, and producer. Her feature directorial debut Sombras de Azul was shot on-location in Cuba and premiered at the Austin Film Festival in 2013, winning the Texas Independents Audience Award. Her second feature, Nakom, was co-directed with her collaborator T.W. Pittman, and was shot in the Upper East Region of Ghana. Nakom had its world premiere at the 66th Berlin International Film Festival in the Panorama section 2016, was selected for the prestigious New Directors/New Films, was nominated for an Independent Spirit John Cassavetes Award for Best Picture made for under $500,000, and had a limited theatrical release in NYC in March 2017. In 2016, Kelly Daniela Norris and T.W. Pittman were selected for Filmmaker Magazine's “25 New Faces of Filmmaking."

== Early life and education ==
Kelly Daniela Norris's mother, Catalina Blackaller, was born in Chihuahua, Mexico and her father, Dr. Ronald Norris, a chiropractor, was born in Tennessee, and they met in Los Angeles. Norris cited her late brother and father as inspirations for her love of cinema, which was cultivated at a very young age. In the 1990s, her father acquired a local video shop's library from a friend in Vista, CA when the shop needed to switch its inventory over from Betamax to VHS. He afterward converted a section of the garage into a makeshift video library, bought a Betamax player, and taught his 5-year-old daughter how to use it.

Norris graduated magna cum laude from Columbia University with a double major in film studies and psychology, and departmental honors in film. Her honors thesis was entitled, "In Search of the Tea Philosopher within the Cinematic Essayist: Chris Marker's Sans Soleil" advised under Richard Peña which "deconstructed the essay-film genre using Phillip Lopate’s criteria alongside the writings of Kazou Okakura". In 2014, she entered a PhD program in the Film and Media Department at the University of California, Berkeley and taught courses on avant-garde cinema, film history, and digital film production before receiving an award for Outstanding Graduate Student Instructor in 2017-2018.

In 2019, Norris gave a talk at the Austin Film Society Cinema on her archival research on stuntwomen from the 1910s, focusing on Helen Holmes of The Hazards of Helen, discussing how the use of fantastical, death-defying female bodies in these early silent serials served to promote and reinforce a new vision of a woman, falling in line with the momentum of First Wave Feminism and the Suffragette Movement of the era.

== Filmography ==
| Year | Film | Role | Awards |
|---|---|---|---|
| 2016 | Nakom (feature) | Co-Director, Producer | Best First Feature Award (nominated) - Berlin International Film Festival; John Cassavetes Award (nominated) - Independent Spirit Awards; Audience Award - Durban International Film Festival; Golden Firebird Award (nominated) - Hong Kong International Film Festival; SIGNIS Award (nominated) - Hong Kong International Film Festival; FIPRESCI Prize (nominated) - Hong Kong International Film Festival; New Directors Competition (nominated) - Seattle International Film Festival; Best Feature - Indy Film Festival; New Directors/New Films; Opening Film - Black Star International Film Festival; 47th International Film Festival of India in Goa; Mumbai Film Festival; Pan African Film Festival; Tacoma Film Festival; San Diego Latino Film Festival; Citizen Jane Film Festival |
| 2013 | Sombras de Azul (feature) | Director, Writer, Co-Producer | Texas Independents Audience Award - Austin Film Festival; Spirit of Independents Award - Fort Lauderdale International Film Festival; Judge's Choice Award Best Drama - Route 66 Film Festival; Best Feature Writing Award - Indy Film Festival; Nueva Vision Award (nominated) - Santa Barbara International Film Festival; Best Screenplay, Best Director, Best Feature (nominated) - Arpa International Film Festival; San Diego Latino Film Festival; Citizen Jane Film Festival |
| 2009 | Sinnerman (short) | Co-Director, Producer | Black Expressions Award - Indianapolis International Film Festival; Audience Award - Route 66 Film Festival; LA Shorts Fest; San Antonio Film Festival |
