= Seduced and Abandoned (2013 film) =

- Film poster
- Directed by: James Toback
- Written by: James Toback
- Produced by: Michael Mailer; Alec Baldwin; James Toback; Morris S. Levy; Alan Helene; Neil Schneider; Larry Herbert
- Cinematography: Ruben Sluijter
- Edited by: Aaron Yanes
- Production company: HanWay Films
- Distributed by: HBO Documentary Films
- Release dates: May 20, 2013 (Cannes); October 28, 2013 (United States)
- Running time: 98 minutes
- Country: United States
- Language: English

Seduced and Abandoned is a 2013 American documentary film directed by James Toback. The film details the journey of Toback and actor Alec Baldwin, as they try to sell a film concept at the Cannes Film Festival in 2012. Taking part in several pitch sessions with producers as well as interviews with directors and actors, the duo explore the film production aspect of film financing. The film premiered at the festival a year later on May 20, 2013.

== Cast ==
- Ryan Gosling
- Jessica Chastain
- Diane Kruger
- Martin Scorsese
- Alec Baldwin
- James Caan
- Roman Polanski
- Francis Ford Coppola
- Bérénice Bejo
- Bernardo Bertolucci
- Jeremy Thomas
- Ben Schneider
- Thorsten Schumacher
- Taki Theodoracopulos

== Production ==
After discussing a film idea for quite some time, actor Alec Baldwin and writer/director James Toback decided to go to the 2012 Cannes Film Festival and document their search for investors. During their time at Cannes, Baldwin and Toback interviewed many high-profile figures in the film industry. "I knew all the directors I approached," said Toback. "I was pretty friendly with a few of them. Alec wanted those particular directors. Ryan Gosling was his idea. I've known Jessica Chastain for several years, and she was my idea. I hadn't thought about Diane Kruger before, but then we ran into her in the lobby of the Carlton Hotel [in Cannes, France]."

== Release and reception ==
Seduced and Abandoned premiered in the Special Screenings section of the 2013 Cannes Film Festival on May 20, 2013. A week prior to its premiere at the festival, the North American rights to the film were acquired by HBO Films. It later aired on HBO on October 28, 2013, and was given a cinematic release in the United Kingdom on November 8, 2013.

The film received positive feedback from critics. Review aggregation website Rotten Tomatoes gives the film a score of 86% based on reviews from 22 critics, with a rating average of seven out of 10. Metacritic, which assigns a weighted average score out of 100 to reviews from mainstream critics, reports the film with two different scores. When combined, the film has a score of 74 based on 19 reviews.

Stephen Holden of The New York Times gave the film a positive review, calling the film "the year’s most entertaining put-on." Holden described it as a film that "rambles entertainingly from topic to topic. [...] There is hardly a dull moment." Hank Stuever of The Washington Post called the film "a fun, larky travel essay and commentary on the film biz, an exquisite wallow in the most rarefied sort of first-world problems." Conversely, David Hinkley of New York Daily News gave the film a negative review, stating, "In a perfect world, Seduced and Abandoned might have told us why it's so hard for grownups to find anything they want to see at the movies these days. Alas, while it flirts with that question and answer, in the end it plays a little too much like a home movie for the film industry."
