= Pariah (2011 film) =

2011 American film by Dee Rees

- Theatrical release poster
- Directed by: Dee Rees
- Written by: Dee Rees
- Produced by: Nekisa Cooper
- Starring: Adepero Oduye; Kim Wayans; Aasha Davis
- Cinematography: Bradford Young
- Edited by: Mako Kamitsuna
- Distributed by: Focus Features
- Release dates: January 21, 2011 (Sundance); December 28, 2011 (United States)
- Running time: 86 minutes
- Country: United States
- Language: English
- Budget: $500,000
- Box office: $769,552 (US)

Pariah is a 2011 American drama film written and directed by Dee Rees. It tells the story of Alike (Adepero Oduye), a 17-year-old Black teenager embracing her identity as a lesbian. It premiered at the 2011 Sundance Film Festival and was awarded the Excellence in Cinematography Award.

Hollywood Reporter critics picked it as one of the 50 best films since 2000. In 2022, the film was selected for preservation in the United States National Film Registry by the Library of Congress as being "culturally, historically or aesthetically significant", making it the first narrative feature from the 2010s chosen for induction by the registry.

== Plot ==
Alike ("Lee") is a 17-year-old Black girl who hangs out at clubs with her openly lesbian friend Laura. Alike slowly and firmly comes to terms with her own identity as a butch lesbian, comfortable in baggy clothes and male underwear. Her Christian mother, Audrey, approves of neither Alike's clothes nor her friendship with Laura. Harboring growing suspicions about Alike's sexuality, Audrey forces her to wear feminine clothing and tries to stem any influence from Laura by pushing Alike to instead make friends with Bina, a girl from her church. Alike has a better relationship with her father Arthur, who is a police detective.

Alike begins to develop feelings for Bina and starts spending more time with her than with Laura, much to Laura's annoyance. Arthur comes back late a few times from work, which angers Audrey, and the two of them fight often. Arthur does not think much about the changes in Alike's life. Saying she is going through a phase, he is supportive of her, although he cautions her on steering clear of the area where there is a lesbian bar, saying it's not safe.

One night after going to see an alternative rock band, Alike and Bina are alone in Bina's room when Bina begins caressing and kissing Alike. Alike is at first hesitant, having had no prior experience with physical intimacy. However, she eventually responds, and the two spend the night together. In the morning, Alike talks to Bina about where they want their relationship to go, but Bina says there is no relationship, as she is not "really gay-gay" and only regarded their physical encounter as playful indulgence. Her only further interest in Alike seems to be her concern that Alike not tell anyone else about the two of them. Hurt and upset, Alike leaves and returns home and cries for hours.

During that time, Audrey and Arthur have an explosive fight about Alike. Despite her sister Sharonda's protests, Alike decides to intervene in the fight, and she comes out to her parents. Disgusted, Audrey viciously attacks Alike while Arthur tries to restrain her. Alike flees to Laura's house where the two friends reconcile. Audrey then tries to forget that anything happened, which annoys the rest of her family. Arthur comes to meet with Alike, apologizes for Audrey's actions, and requests that Alike come back home, offering half-hearted assurance that, if she does, "things will be different". Alike says that she will not return home, but instead plans to move to California to begin college early. She assures her father that, "I'm not running. I'm choosing."

Before leaving, Alike makes an attempt to reconcile with her mother as well. However, her mother refuses to accept her and offers only that she will be praying for Alike. Arthur, Sharonda, and Laura see Alike off on her journey west, and the film ends with Alike reading a poem she wrote. Its theme echoes her words to her father that she is not running but choosing.

== Cast ==
- Adepero Oduye as Alike
- Aasha Davis as Bina, Alike's love interest
- Charles Parnell as Arthur, Alike's father
- Kim Wayans as Audrey, Alike's mother
- Pernell Walker as Laura, Alike's best friend
- Sahra Mellesse as Sharonda, Alike's younger sister

== Production ==
The film is a feature-length expansion of writer/director Dee Rees’ award-winning 2007 short film Pariah. Spike Lee was one of the executive producers. Filming took place in and around New York City, predominantly in the Fort Greene neighborhood in Brooklyn.

== Reception and legacy ==
Pariah premiered at the 2011 Sundance Film Festival and was awarded the Excellence in Cinematography Award. The film was shown at the Toronto International Film Festival in September 2011.

On review aggregator Rotten Tomatoes, the film holds an approval rating of 95% based on 124 reviews, with an average rating of 7.9/10. The website's critics consensus reads: "Pulsing with authenticity and led by a stirring lead performance from Adepero Oduye, Pariah is a powerful coming out/coming-of-age film that signals the arrival of a fresh new talent in writer/director Dee Rees." On Metacritic, the film has a weighted average score of 79 out of 100, based on 34 critics, indicating "generally favorable reviews".

The New York Times film critic A. O. Scott wrote that to watch Adepero Oduye play Alike "is to experience the thrill of discovery." Scott continued by saying that "Pariah has a point to make, and a point of view to argue, but it also, above all, wants to illuminate an individual universe of meaning and emotion."

AutoStraddle placed the movie third on its list of the top 200 lesbian, queer and bisexual movies of all time.

The film held a special screening at the 2024 Sundance Film Festival on January 26, 2024 to commemorate the festival's 40th anniversary. On the announcement, Rees remarked "I'm moved and excited to be coming back to where it all began and celebrating this special anniversary with the Institute ... From the lab advisors, to the fellows, to the audiences, Sundance was that magically supportive and generous community that enabled Pariah to be born in the world and it’s always a joyous, heady feeling to return."

== Accolades ==
- African-American Film Critics Association
  - Best Picture (runner-up)
  - Best Independent Film (Winner)
  - Best Breakthrough Performance, (Adepero Oduye) (Winner)
- Black Reel Awards
  - Best Picture (Nominated)
  - Best Director: Dee Rees, (Nominated)
  - Best Actress: Adepero Oduye, (Nominated)
  - Best Screenplay: Dee Rees, (Nominated)
  - Best Supporting Actress:
    - Kim Wayans, (Nominated)
    - Pernell Walker, (Nominated)
  - Best Ensemble, (Nominated)
  - Best Breakthrough Performance:
    - Kim Wayans, (Nominated)
    - Adepero Oduye, (Winner)
- Black Film Critics Circle
  - Best Picture (runner-up)
  - Best Director: (Dee Rees), Winner
  - Best Original Screenplay: (Dee Rees), Winner
  - Best Independent Film, Winner
  - Best Breakthrough Performance: (Adepero Oduye), Winner
- Independent Spirit Awards
  - Best Female Lead, Adepero Oduye (Nominated)
  - John Cassavetes Award (Winner)
- 44th NAACP Image Awards
  - Outstanding Independent Motion Picture (Winner)
  - Outstanding Motion Picture (Nominated)
  - Outstanding Actress in a Motion Picture:
    - Adepero Oduye - "Pariah" (Nominated)
  - Outstanding Supporting Actor in a Motion Picture:
    - Charles Parnell - "Pariah" (Nominated)
  - Outstanding Supporting Actress in a Motion Picture:
    - Kim Wayans - "Pariah" (Nominated)

== See also ==
- Pariah (soundtrack)
- List of LGBT-related films directed by women
- List of black films of the 2010s
- List of LGBT-related films
