= War Pony =

2022 film by Riley Keough and Gina Gammell

- Release poster
- Directed by: Riley Keough; Gina Gammell
- Written by: Riley Keough; Gina Gammell; Franklin Sioux Bob; Bill Reddy
- Produced by: Riley Keough; Gina Gammell; Willi White; Bert Hamelinck; Sacha Ben Harroche; Ryan Zacarias; Salim El Arja; Bear Damen; Val Abel
- Starring: Jojo Bapteise Whiting; Ladainian Crazy Thunder
- Cinematography: David Gallego
- Edited by: Affonso Gonçalves; Eduardo Serrano
- Music by: Christopher Stracey; Mato Wayuhi
- Production companies: Felix Culpa; Caviar
- Distributed by: Momentum Pictures
- Release dates: May 21, 2022 (Cannes); July 28, 2023 (United States)
- Running time: 115 minutes
- Country: United States
- Language: English
- Box office: $101,408

War Pony is a 2022 American drama film directed and produced by Riley Keough and Gina Gammell—the first time either had directed a feature—from a screenplay by Keough, Gammell, Franklin Sioux Bob and Bill Reddy. It stars Jojo Bapteise Whiting and Ladainian Crazy Thunder.

It had its world premiere at the 2022 Cannes Film Festival in the Un Certain Regard section on May 21, 2022, and won the Caméra d'Or, which is awarded for the best first feature film. It was released in the United States on July 28, 2023, by Momentum Pictures.

== Plot ==
Follows the intertwined lives of two Lakota boys living on the Pine Ridge Indian Reservation in South Dakota. One is Bill, a 23-year-old father of two toddlers. The other is Matho, a 12-year-old drug dealer.

== Cast ==
- Jojo Bapteise Whiting as Bill
- LaDainian Crazy Thunder as Matho
- Ashley Shelton as Allison
- Sprague Hollander as Tim
- Jesse Schmockel as Echo
- Ta-Yamni Long Black Cat as Donny
- Wilma Colhof as Mama
- Iona Red Bear as Auntie
- Stanley Good Voice Elk as Dusty
- Steven Yellow Hawk as Steven
- Jen Mesteth as Jen
- Wasose Garcia as Mason
- Robert Stover as Colton
- Woodrow Lone Elk as Elias
- Jeremy Corbin Cottier as Baby Worm

== Production ==
In 2015, while on production of American Honey, Riley Keough befriended two extras, Franklin Sioux Bob and Bill Reddy, while filming in South Dakota and later introduced them to her best friend Gina Gammell. Over the course of several years, the project began to take shape, through writing workshops, improvisation sessions, and meeting hundreds of locals in the community, to make the story authentic. The group began discussing an idea for a film revolving around two indigenous locals growing up on the Pine Ridge Indian Reservation. They began writing the script based upon Bob and Reddy's life experiences and stories they had heard, ending up with too much material, and decided to split the story between two characters, and collaborated with local producer Willi White.

== Release ==
The film had its world premiere at the 2022 Cannes Film Festival on May 21, 2022, in the Un Certain Regard section. It won the Caméra d'Or for Best First Film, while the lead animal actor, Brit, won the Palm Dog award. Shortly after, Picturehouse Entertainment acquired U.K. and Irish distribution rights to the film. In March 2023, Momentum Pictures acquired U.S. distribution rights to the film. It was released in the United Kingdom on June 9, 2023. and in the United States on July 28, 2023.

== Reception ==
On the review aggregator website Rotten Tomatoes, 93% of 54 critics' reviews are positive, with an average rating of 7.2/10. The website's consensus reads: "With subtlety and authenticity, War Pony tracks the lives of two young Indigenous men and cements the two women behind the lens, Riley Keough and Gina Gammell, as talents to watch." Metacritic, which uses a weighted average, assigned the film a score of 70 out of 100, based on 18 critics, indicating "generally favorable" reviews.
