= The Road to Calvary (TV series) =

- Genre: War epic
- Written by: Elena Raiskaya
- Directed by: Konstantin Khudyakov
- Starring: Anna Chipovskaya; Yuliya Snigir; Leonid Bichevin
- No. of seasons: 1
- No. of episodes: 12

Production
- Executive producers: Irina Bark; Susanna Muasen
- Producers: Timur Vaynshteyn; Aleksey Zemskiy; Yuriy Sapronov
- Running time: 48 minutes
- Production company: Russian World Studios

Original release
- Network: NTV
- Release: 27 November – 5 December 2017

The Road to Calvary (Russian: Хождение по мукам, romanized: Khozhdeniye po mukam) is a Russian 12-episode television miniseries from 2017. It is based on the eponymous trilogy of novels of the Soviet writer Alexei Tolstoy and directed by Konstantin Khudyakov.

The first run began on November 27, 2017 at 21:40 on NTV in Russia. The series was available on Netflix with English subtitles but Netflix seems to have pulled it as of September 2020.

== Plot ==
The series covers the years 1914 to 1919. The action begins before the outbreak of World War I. Society is in anticipation of major change. In the center of the story are the Bulavina sisters: Katya and Dasha. The girls share a love for the decadent poet Alexei Bessonov, who changes their worldview and way of thinking, predicting the end of Russia.

The first world war brings new experiences to the serene existence of the Bulavin-Smokovnikov family. After the war and revolution, the ways of the sisters diverge. Katerina Bulavina falls in love with the white officer Vadim Roshchin.

== Cast ==
- Anna Chipovskaya as Darya Dmitrievna Bulavina
- Yuliya Snigir as Ekaterina Dmitrievna Smokovnikova
- Leonid Bichevin as Ivan Ilich Telegin
- Pavel Trubiner as Vadim Petrovich Roshchin
- Svetlana Khodchenkova as Liza Rastorgueva
- Andrey Merzlikin as Arkady Zhadov
- Anton Shagin as Alexey Alexeevich Bessonov (prototype as Alexander Blok)
- Alexey Kolgan as Nikolai Ivanovich Smokovnikov, lawyer, husband of Catherine
- Sergey Koltakov as Dmitry Bulavin, doctor, father of Daria and Catherine
- Evgeniy Tkachuk as Sergey Sapozhkov
- Aleksandr Yatsenko as Alexey Krasilnikov
- Lyubov Aksyonova as Ganna
- Roman Madyanov as Olovyannikov
- Dmitri Dyuzhev as Mamont Dalsky
- Yevgeny Stychkin as Nestor Makhno
- Sergei Puskepalis as General Romanovsky
- Andrei Chernyshov as Ivan Sorokin
- Roman Kurtsyn as Mishka Solomin
- Aleksandr Galibin as Boris Savinkov
- Vasily Shchipitsyn as Lenin
- Petr Rykov as Zhukov
- Maxim Stoyanov as Dmitro
