= Nakom =

2016 film

- Film poster
- Directed by: Kelly Daniela Norris; T. W. Pittman
- Written by: Isaac Adakudugu; T. W. Pittman
- Produced by: Isaac Adakudugu; Kelly Daniela Norris; T.W. Pittman; Giovanni Ximénez
- Starring: Jacob Ayanaba
- Cinematography: Bob Geile
- Edited by: Tomas Vengris
- Music by: Daby Balde
- Distributed by: Corinth Films
- Release date: 15 February 2016 (Berlin)
- Running time: 90 minutes
- Countries: Ghana; United States
- Language: Kussal

Nakom is a 2016 internationally co-produced drama film directed by Kelly Daniela Norris and T. W. Pittman. The film had its world premiere at the 66th Berlin International Film Festival in the Panorama section and was invited to have its North American premiere at the New Directors/New Films Festival in New York.

== Plot ==
An intimate narrative from Northern Ghana, Nakom follows Iddrisu, a talented medical student who must return to his home village after his father's sudden death and fight for his family's survival.

== Cast ==
- Jacob Ayanaba as Iddrisu Awinzor
- Grace Ayariga as Damata
- Justina Kulidu as Senior Mother
- Shetu Musah as Junior Mother
- Abdul Aziz as Kamal
- Esther Issaka as Fatima
- James Azure as Chief of Nakom

== Reception ==
Nakom won the Audience Choice Award at the 37th Durban International Film Festival. It was nominated for the Best First Feature Award at the 66th Berlin International Film Festival. At the Hong Kong International Film Festival, it was nominated for the FIPRESCI Prize, the Golden Firebird Award, and the SIGNIS Award. At the Seattle International Film Festival, it was nominated for the New Directors Competition. It has been nominated for the 2016 Independent Spirit John Cassavetes Award.

Dennis Harvey for Variety positively reviewed Nakom after its world premiere at the Berlinale. He wrote "for U.S.-based co-directors Kelly Daniela Norris and TW Pittman, [Nakom] doesn't have the outside-looking-in feel of similar international co-productions, but there's an air of authenticity as well as a pleasingly laid-back yet substantive narrative engagement to this polished effort."

John DeFore for The Hollywood Reporter wrote "a cast of non-actors acquits itself very nicely here, and the nature of the shoot — in which locals played key roles in the low-budget production — make the film's polish all the more impressive ... a strong performance from star Jacob Ayanaba should win fans at fests and play well to a niche audience on video."

In Manohla Dargis's "favorites" for the New Directors/New Films program, she wrote "NAKOM is made memorable through the graceful visuals, gentle pacing and deep feeling that the directors T. W. Pittman and Kelly Daniela Norris bring to this story.

"Kelly Daniela Norris and T.W. Pittman's Nakom immediately announces itself as a modest triumph of world-building," says Wes Greene at Slant. "Nakom depicts a culture rarely ever shown on screen, and yet Iddrisu's struggle to move forward without betraying his upbringing reflects feelings that are unmistakably universal."
