= Lbs. (film) =

- Directed by: Matthew Bonifacio
- Written by: Matthew Bonifacio; Carmine Famiglietti
- Produced by: Matthew Bonifacio; Carmine Famiglietti
- Starring: Carmine Famiglietti
- Cinematography: William M. Miller
- Edited by: Jim Rubino
- Music by: Carlo Giacco
- Production company: Brooklyn-Queen Experiment
- Distributed by: Truly Indie
- Release dates: January 2004 (Sundance); March 26, 2010
- Running time: 99 minutes
- Country: United States
- Language: English

Lbs. is a 2004 American comedy-drama film directed by Matthew Bonifacio and starring Carmine Famiglietti.

== Cast ==
- Carmine Famiglietti
- Michael Aronov
- Miriam Shor
- Sharon Angela
- Lou Martini Jr.
- Susan Varon
- Fil Formicola

== Reception ==
The film has an 82% rating on Rotten Tomatoes. Diego Semerene of Slant Magazine awarded the film one and a half stars out of four. Wesley Morris of The Boston Globe awarded the film two and a half stars out of four.

The Hollywood Reporter/Associated Press gave the film a positive review and wrote, "Lbs. addresses its all-too-relevant topic with subtlety, sensitivity and welcome doses of humor."

== Nomination ==
The film was nominated for the Independent Spirit John Cassavetes Award at the 26th Independent Spirit Awards.
