= The Quitter (2014 film) =

- Directed by: Matthew Bonifacio
- Written by: Bill Gullo
- Produced by: Matthew Bonifacio; Julianna Gelinas Bonifacio; Neil Jain
- Starring: Matthew Bonifacio
- Cinematography: Timonty Nuttall
- Edited by: Avi Edelman
- Music by: David Cieri
- Production companies: Goodface Films; Howling Wolf Productions
- Release date: September 12, 2014 (New York City)
- Running time: 85 minutes 86 minutes
- Country: United States
- Language: English

The Quitter is a 2014 American comedy-drama film directed by and starring Matthew Bonifacio.

== Cast ==
- Matthew Bonifacio
- Deirdre O'Connell
- Dan Grimaldi
- Jack O'Connell
- Natasha Lyonne
- Julianna Gelinas Bonifacio
- Destiny Money Cruz
- Neil Jain

== Release ==
The film had its theatrical premiere in New York City on September 12, 2014.
