= Amexicano =

- Directed by: Matthew Bonifacio
- Written by: Carmine Famiglietti
- Produced by: Matthew Bonifacio
- Release date: April 28, 2007 (Tribeca)
- Country: United States
- Language: English

Amexicano is a drama film directed by Matthew Bonifacio and written by Carmine Famiglietti. The film explores the relationship between a blue-collar Italian-American man and an illegal Mexican immigrant as they both try to make a living in Queens, New York. It world premiered at the 2007 Tribeca Film Festival and won the Jury Award for producer/director Matthew Bonifacio in the category of Narrative Film at the 2007 Sonoma Valley Film Festival. It was released theatrically in 2008.
