= 33 Place Brugmann =

2025 novel by Alice Austen

- First edition hard cover
- Author: Alice Austen
- Cover artist: Kelly Winton
- Language: English
- Genre: Historical fiction
- Publisher: Grove Atlantic
- Publication date: March 11, 2025
- Publication place: United States
- Pages: 360
- ISBN: 978-0-8021-6408-7

33 Place Brugmann is the debut novel of American author Alice Austen. It was published on March 11, 2025 by Grove Atlantic. The novels follows the residents of an apartment building in Brussels during the Nazi occupation of Belgium.

== Background ==
The novel was inspired by Austen's experience living in 33 Place Brugmann. She described living there as a "momentous time" for her, as her eldest son was born and her first play was produced during that time. She learned about the events of the German occupation of the building from two residents who had been living there since before World War II. Leo Raphaël's art collection was inspired by the private art collection of one of those two residents.

== Synopsis ==
In 1939 Ixelles, the Raphaël family leave their home in the Beaux-Arts apartment building 33 Place Brugmann, along with their painting collection. Shortly thereafter, the inhabitants of 33 Place Brugmann witness the Nazi invasion of Belgium.

== Characters ==
5th Floor Maid's Room

- Masha Balyaleva — a seamstress refugee from Russia who has an affair with a compatriot of Colonel Herman Warlemont.

Apartment 4L

- Francois G. Sauvin — an architect who is haunted by his memories of World War I. The father of Charlotte Sauvin.
- Charlotte E. Sauvin — a colorblind painter who studies at the Royal Academy of Fine Arts Antwerp. She finds herself caught between two potential lovers—Julian Raphaël, whom she has known since childhood, and Philippe, a fellow art student. The daughter of Francois Sauvin.

Apartment 4R

A Jewish family that flees to the United Kingdom shortly before the Nazi invasion.

- Leo Raphaël — a fine art dealer, the husband of Sophia Raphaël and the father of Esther and Julian Raphaël.
- Sophia Raphaël — a housewife, the wife of Leo Raphaël and the mother of Esther and Julian Raphaël.
- Esther Raphaël — the daughter of Leo and Sophia Raphaël and the sister of Julian Raphaël.
- Julian Raphaël — an aspiring filmmaker who studies mathematics at Cambridge University, Charlotte Sauvin's closest friend, the son of Leo and Sophia Raphaël and the brother of Esther Raphael.

Apartment 3L

- Colonel Herman Warlemont — a widowed member of the Belgian Armed Forces who lives with his dog Zipper.

Apartment 3R

- Agathe Hobert — an embittered former café owner.

Apartment 2R

- Martin DeBaerre — a lawyer, the husband of Katrin DeBaerre, and the father of Dirk DeBaerre.
- Katrin DeBaerre — a housewife, the wife of Martin DeBaerre, and the mother of Dirk DeBaerre.
- Dirk DeBaerre — a suspected collarator who studies at Katholieke Universiteit Leuven, the son of Martin and Katrin DeBaerre.

Ground Floor

- Jan Everard — a notary and the husband of Annick Everard
- Annick Everard — a housewife and the wife of Jan Everard.

== Reception ==
The novel was shortlisted for a National Jewish Book Award in Fiction and a New Harmony Book Award. It was selected as one of the ten adult debuts featured in the Winter/Spring 2025 Indies Introduce program. The audiobook edition was nominated for an Audie Award for Literary Fiction & Classics.

The novel was praised by Kirkus Reviews, Publishers Weekly, and The Washington Post for its ability to shift between a large number of viewpoints. Kirkus Reviews also praised the novel's banter and its "thrilling, moving plot". Sam Sacks of The Wall Street Journal called it a "nimble debut".
