= Master Maggie =

- Film poster
- Directed by: Matthew Bonifacio
- Story by: Julianna Gelinas Bonifacio; Matthew Bonifacio
- Produced by: Julianna Gelinas Bonifacio; Matthew Bonifacio
- Starring: Lorraine Bracco; Neil Jain
- Release date: April 29, 2019 (Tribeca)
- Country: United States
- Language: English

Master Maggie is a 2019 American short film directed by Matthew Bonifacio and starring Lorraine Bracco and Neil Jain.

== Cast ==
- Lorraine Bracco as Maggie
- Neil Jain as Graham
- Brian Dennehy
- Kenan Thompson
- Chris Henry Coffey

== Release ==
The film premiered at the Tribeca Film Festival on April 29, 2019.

== Reception ==
Alan Ng of Film Threat gave the film an 8 out of 10.
