= Rosie Alison =

British television documentary director, film producer and novelist

Rosie Alison, Lady Waterstone (born 1964) is a British television documentary director, film producer and novelist. Her debut novel, The Very Thought of You was nominated for the 2010 Baileys Women's Prize for Fiction.

== Biography ==
Rosie Alison, was born in 1964. She studied English at Keble College, Oxford. She then spent over ten years working in television, as a producer-director of arts documentaries.

Her documentary credits include The South Bank Show, Omnibus, Bookmark, and Grand Designs. In 2001 Alison moved away from documentaries and into drama, joining David Heyman's production company Heyday Films.

She was a co-producer of The Boy in The Striped Pyjamas (written and directed by Mark Herman), and Is Anybody There? (written by Peter Harness, directed by John Crowley), an executive producer of Paddington and Paddington 2 (written and directed by Paul King), and The Light Between Oceans (written and directed by Derek Cianfrance), and a producer of Testament of Youth (written by Juliette Towhidi, directed by James Kent), and the 2020 adaptation of The Secret Garden (written by Jack Thorne, directed by Marc Munden).

She has been a producer on several BBC TV dramas, including David Hare's intelligence thriller Page Eight, Christopher Hampton's ghost story The Thirteenth Tale (directed by James Kent), the Andrea Levy adaptation The Long Song (written by Sarah Williams, directed by Mahalia Belo), and the BBC1 surveillance thriller The Capture (written and directed by Ben Chanan).

She is married to Tim Waterstone, the founder of the Waterstones bookshop chain; their daughter is actress Daisy Waterstone.
