= Bishop Blay =

Liberian actor

- Born: 1980 (age 45–46)
- Occupation: Actor
- Notable work: Out of My Hand (2015)

Bishop Blay (born 1980) is a Liberian actor.

== Biography ==
Blay was born in Liberia in 1980. During the Liberian Civil War, Blay worked as a rubber tree tapper in one of the largest rubber plantations in the country. He escaped to Ghana and lived at a refugee camp. During his time at the camp, he began his acting training by performing in improvised "street dramas". After the war, he acted in Liberian film and theater productions. Blay also worked in a parking lot in Monrovia when not acting.

In 2015, Blay made his feature film debut in Takeshi Fukunaga's Out of My Hand. He played Cisco, a rubber tapper who is involved in a labor dispute, and eventually decides to immigrate to New York. When he arrives in America, Blay's character is forced to confront his dark past. Katie Walsh of the Los Angeles Times wrote that "Blay brings a naturalism and grounded soulfulness to his performance," noting that he "has an arresting face and an even more arresting screen presence." The film debuted at the Berlin International Film Festival and won the U.S. Fiction Award at the Los Angeles Film Festival. Fukunaga discovered Blay at an audition that he had in cooperation with the Liberian Movie Union, and was impressed with Blay's ability to convey emotion through facial expressions.

Like his character, Blay moved to New York to further his career.
