= This Is Not a War Story =

- Directed by: Talia Lugacy
- Written by: Talia Lugacy
- Produced by: Talia Lugacy; Noah Lang; Julian West
- Starring: Talia Lugacy
- Cinematography: Ryan De Franco
- Edited by: Talia Lugacy
- Production company: Acoustic Pictures
- Distributed by: HBO Max
- Release dates: February 4, 2021 (SF Indie Fest); November 3, 2021
- Running time: 112 minutes
- Country: United States
- Language: English

This Is Not a War Story is a 2021 American war drama film written by, directed by, edited by and starring Talia Lugacy.

== Summary ==
A group of ragtag New York veterans create art that dealt with the aftermath of war.

== Cast ==
- Talia Lugacy as Isabelle Casale
- Sam Adegoke as Will LaRue
- Danny Ramirez as Timothy Reyes
- Frances Fisher as Dora Casale
- Patrick Stoffer as Malloy
- Brian Delate as Ed

== Production ==
Rosario Dawson served as an executive producer of the film. WarnerMedia OneFifty and HBO Max acquired the distribution rights to the film in September 2021.

== Release and reception ==
The film premiered at the 2021 SF Indie Fest. It was eventually released on November 3, 2021.

The film currently has a 100% rating on the review aggregator Rotten Tomatoes based on 11 reviews. The website's consensus reads, "This Is Not a War Story takes a sobering yet uplifting look at life after combat -- and life-altering friendship in unexpected places."

Peter Sobczynski of RogerEbert.com awarded the film three stars, calling it "an ambitious and thoughtful attempt to deal with veterans coming to terms with what they have seen and done..."

Bobby LePire of Film Threat rated the film a 9.5 out of 10 and wrote, "This Is Not A Story boasts stunning acting, fantastic music, a heartfelt plot, and impeccable directing. It is a remarkable sophomore feature for writer-director-actor-producer Talia Lugacy, her first in 14 years."

== Accolades ==
The film was awarded prizes at the Urbanworld Film Festival, Tallgrass Film Festival, SF Independent Film Festival, Indie Street Film Festival, Atlanta Underground Film Festival, Portland Film Festival, and Workers Unite Film Festival.

In December 2021, the film was nominated for the John Cassavetes Award at the 2022 Film Independent Spirit Awards.
