= Matthew Bonifacio =

American filmmaker

Matthew Bonifacio (born c. 1973) is an American filmmaker. He was born and raised in Brooklyn. Bonifacio is married to Julianna Gelinas Bonifacio.

For their work in Lbs., Bonifacio and Carmine Famiglietti were nominated for the Independent Spirit John Cassavetes Award at the 26th Independent Spirit Awards.

== Select filmography ==
- Lbs. (2004)
- Amexicano (2007)
- The Quitter (2014)
- Master Maggie (2019)
