= Morris S. Levy =

American film and television producer

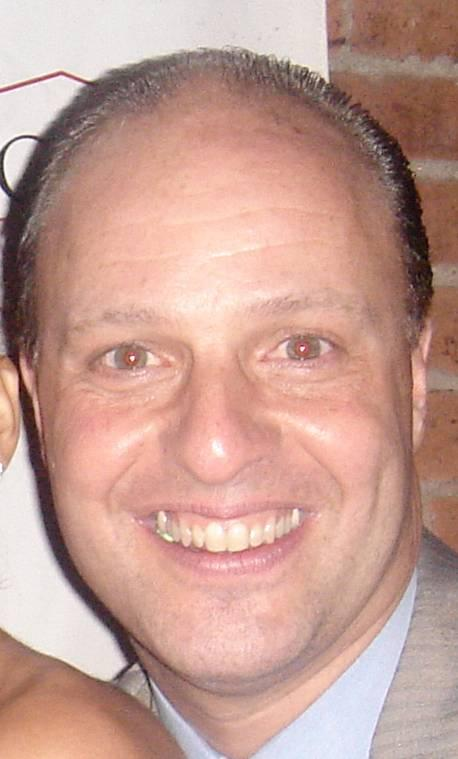
- Morris S. Levy
- Born: Brooklyn, NY, USA
- Occupations: Film, television, and theatrical producer
- Organization(s): M.E.G.A. Films (Morsly Entertainment Group and the Arts)
- Known for: Films such as "The Ten," "Seduced and Abandoned," "Affluenza," "Descent," "Angie: Lost Girls"
- Awards: Audience Award and Best Picture Award at the New York International Film Festival for "A Novel Romance"

Morris S. Levy is a film, television, and theatrical producer who was born in Brooklyn, NY and raised in Kings Point, New York. He is the founder and President of M.E.G.A. Films (Morsly Entertainment Group and the Arts), a New York-based production company. He often films in Great Neck as well as all over the New York City area. His films have appeared in the Sundance Film Festival (The Ten-starring Paul Rudd, Winona Ryder, Jessica Alba and Liev Schreiber), the Cannes Film Festival (Seduced and Abandoned-starring Alec Baldwin, Ryan Gosling and Jessica Chastain), and the Tribeca Film Festival (Descent-starring Rosario Dawson) amongst other festivals. His film A Novel Romance won the Audience Award and Best Picture Award at the New York International Film Festival. His TV series, Cop Show (starring Colin Quinn, Jerry Seinfeld, Amy Schumer, Chris Rock and Seth Meyers) won best comedy, among other awards at the 2015 New York City Webfest. His 2020 critically acclaimed film ″Angie: Lost Girls″ won Best Picture at the Moving Parts Film Festival and also won an Award of Excellence from the Accolade Global Film Competition. Mr. Levy is a producer of the Off-Broadway show My Life on a Diet starring Renee Taylor (Emmy Winner and Academy Award Nominee), which received rave reviews from the NY Times, NY Post, LA Times, and was nominated for a 2019 Lucille Lortel Award for Outstanding Solo Show. He is also a producer on the Off Broadway show Mornings at Seven (revival of the Tony Award winning play) starring Tony Roberts, Judith Ivey, and Don Lauria. Before entering the entertainment business, he was a principal in a ladies' clothing company and was also prominent in the New York nightlife business as a promoter/owner.

== Partial filmography ==
- Descent (2007 film)
- The Ten (2007))
- Seduced and Abandoned (2013)
- Affluenza (2014)
- Cop Show (2015-2016)
- Angie: Lost Girls (2020)
