= Tim Waterstone =

British bookseller and author (born 1939)

Sir Tim Waterstone
- Born: Timothy John Stuart Waterstone; 30 May 1939 (age 87); Glasgow, Scotland
- Education: Tonbridge School; St Catharine's College, Cambridge
- Occupations: Bookseller, Businessman, Author
- Spouse: Rosie Alison
- Children: 8, including Daisy

Sir Timothy Waterstone (born in Glasgow 30 May 1939) is a British bookseller, businessman and author. He is the founder of Waterstones, Europe's largest bookseller retailer.

== Early life ==
Tim Waterstone is the son of Malcolm Stuart Waterstone, MBE, and Sylvia Catherine Sawday. Waterstone described his childhood home in Crowborough, Sussex, as "rather cramped, 1930s detached house ... Ugly, unpretentious, nice big garden, fields at the end of it". He studied at Tonbridge School and read English at St Catharine's College, Cambridge.

== Career ==
Waterstone worked for a brokerage in Calcutta, India. Later he returned to England and worked as a marketing manager for Allied Breweries (1964–73) and W.H. Smith (1973–81). He used a £6,000 redundancy payment from W.H. Smith to found the first branch of Waterstone's in South Kensington, London in 1982. The business model was to hold unconventionally heavy stock per square foot in large bookshops, staffed by young, highly read, university graduates, many of whom destined subsequently to prominent careers in the arts world in general. Under this model, by 1992 Waterstone's grew to become Europe's largest bookseller. When HMV and Waterstone's merged in 1998 Waterstone served as chairman of HMV Media Group until 2001.

Waterstone chaired the DTI Working Group on Smaller Quoted Companies and Private Investors in 1999. He was a founding investor in Bookberry, a Moscow-based booksellers modelled on Waterstone's. He became the chairman of Read Petite, an e-book company, in 2013.

Waterstone has published four novels: Lilley & Chase, An Imperfect Marriage, A Passage of Lives and In For A Penny In For A Pound. His short story The Tiffany Glass Panel was published in The Mail on Sunday in 1994. He has published a semi-autobiographical business book, Swimming Against The Stream. His memoir, The Face Pressed Against A Window was published in 2019, the audiobook of which he personally narrated. It was selected as one of the Daily Mail's Memoirs of the Year. He featured on the BBC Radio 4 programme Desert Island Discs broadcast on 4 August 2019.

== Philanthropy and political activity ==
Waterstone was a chairman or board member of English International (1987–1992), the London Philharmonic Orchestra (1990–1997), Portman House Trust (1994–1996), the Academy of Ancient Music (1990–1995), Sinclair-Stevenson Publishers (1989–1994), Virago Press (1993–1995), Jazz FM (1991–1993), the London International Festival of Theatre (1990–1992), the Elgar Foundation (1992–1998), the British Library (1995–1997), King's College London Library (2000–2002), Yale University Press (1992–2013), Chelsea Stores (1996–2007), FutureStart (1992–2009), Virago Press (1995–1996), Hill Samuel UK Emerging Companies Investment Trust plc (1996–2000) and Downing Classic VCT (1998–2003).

He was on the Booker Prize Management Committee, and the Chairman of Judges for the Prince's Youth Business Trust Awards. He served as a member of the visiting committee of Cambridge University Library (2007–2013). He chaired Shelter's 25th Anniversary Appeal. He served as Chancellor of Edinburgh Napier University (2007–2015).

Waterstone supports the Labour Party and chose Clement Attlee as his 'hero' in the BBC Radio 4 series Great Lives. He demonstrated agained the Iraq War. Waterstone is a campaigner for the three parties of the Left to merge in order to increase the chance of their electoral success. He also campaigns for proportional representation for the House of Lords, based on the general election popular vote. He proposes a membership of 500 peers appointed from party lists, and a further 100 crossbenchers, selected by the Appointments Commission and chosen in the interests of special groupings, particularly regional ones.

== Personal life ==
Waterstone divorced twice. He is married to TV & film producer and novelist Rosie Alison. He has eight children, including actress Daisy Waterstone. He lives in Primrose Hill, London.

Waterstone is a member of the Garrick Club. He is an Honorary Fellow of St Catharine's College, Cambridge. He was knighted in 2018 for services to bookselling and to charity.

Academic offices
Preceded by George Younger, 4th Viscount Younger of Leckie	Chancellor of Edinburgh Napier University; 2007–present	Succeeded by Incumbent
