= Descent (2007 film) =

2007 film by Talia Lugacy

- Release poster
- Directed by: Talia Lugacy
- Written by: Talia Lugacy; Brian Priest
- Produced by: Rosario Dawson; Morris S. Levy; Talia Lugacy
- Starring: Rosario Dawson; Chad Faust; Marcus Patrick
- Cinematography: Christopher LaVasseur
- Edited by: Frank Reynolds
- Music by: Alex Moulton
- Distributed by: City Lights Pictures
- Release dates: April 26, 2007 (Tribeca); August 10, 2007 (United States)
- Running time: 105 minutes
- Country: United States
- Language: English
- Box office: $15,233

Descent is a 2007 American rape-and-revenge thriller film directed by Talia Lugacy and produced by and starring Rosario Dawson. The plot centers on Maya, a college student who is date raped by an acquaintance, Jared. After the incident, she struggles to rebuild her life and eventually seeks revenge against Jared.

== Plot ==
Maya is an upcoming artist and college student. In the winter of her senior year, Maya attends a fraternity party and meets a student named Jared, who is portrayed as a classic jock. Jared immediately starts courting her using all his eloquence behind which there is nothing but lies. Seduced by his lies, she accepts his invitation to dinner at a restaurant, then goes to his apartment, just to talk. They start to make out, but when Maya tells him to stop, Jared soon reveals his true self and rapes her while uttering dehumanizing, racial slurs in her ear.

Over the next year, Maya's personality changes. She becomes quiet and withdrawn, graduating from college and taking a job at a clothing store. She disconnects herself from society and other familiar surroundings while struggling to break free of the resulting depression and addiction. At night, she's someone else: a beauty at the nightclub scene, dancing, seductive, sniffing cocaine. Maya later meets and seeks out the help of a DJ she meets at a club, named Adrian, whom she confides in. Later on, Maya becomes a Teacher's Aide to a class Jared is in. One day, she catches him cheating on an exam and threatens to report it, but instead uses it as an opportunity to lure Jared to her apartment, telling him "I want to see you again". Jared willingly complies as he believes Maya indeed wants to see him again, unaware of her much darker intentions.

Maya and Jared return later that day to her apartment. She orders Jared to "strip", which he does, and blindfolds him while acting seductively. The immediate scene after shows Jared now handcuffed to her bed, and upon calling for her to ask where she is, she slaps him hard and leans into his ear, whispering that he will lose his tongue if he continues. She exclaims that it is now her time to talk and picks up a can of paint, with which she writes on Jared's chest one of the slurs he uttered to her during his assault. While painting, she starts what seems to be at first a normal conversation and talks to him about "words", referencing to the past. Everything seems relatively normal until Maya tells Jared that he appears in her dreams. She discusses a particularly common one, which Jared appears to recognise as a reference to their past. The topic then takes a darker turn as Maya brings up Jared's assault on and begins to cry.

Jared's attempts to calm and reassure Maya fail as she becomes enraged and gags him, telling him to shut up and that "nobody wants to listen" to him. She picks up a phallic object to use as a dildo, and anally rapes him for over two minutes. Maya utters many of the same things that Jared uttered during his assault. He screams loudly and writhes around vigorously in pain as she mercilessly continues her assault inside of him. She continues to speak to him seductively, taunting him further. Eventually, as a response to the ordeal, Jared becomes physically aroused and ejaculates.

Maya then allows Adrian to rape Jared for several minutes as she also briefly stimulates him. Adrian taunts Jared psychologically for becoming once again physically aroused as he is assaulted and for "making a mess" over himself. Adrian echoes the slurs Jared said to Maya as well as using his own taunts. As Jared gives up struggling against Adrian's assault, Adrian then asks Maya if "everything's alright now." She silently turns to Adrian and is seen to be crying, possibly indicating that this has not truly helped her get over what happened to her. This is further implied when Maya thinks to herself, "I need to get over it. I know it, and I will". The film then ends as the screen fades black.

== Cast ==
- Rosario Dawson as Maya
- Chad Faust as Jared
- Marcus Patrick as Adrian
- James A. Stephens as Professor Byron
- Vanessa Ferlito as Bodega Girl
- Tracie Thoms as Denise
- Alexie Gilmore as Seline
- Jonathan Tchaikovsky as Tyler
- Phoebe Strole as Innocent Girl
- Nicole Vicius as Melanie
- Scott Bailey as Upstairs Guy

== Release ==
Descent was released in two alternate cuts: a 105-minute uncut NC-17 rated version and a 95-minute R-rated version. The notable difference between the two is that the edited release omits about seven minutes of the second rape scene. The film was co-produced by Dawson and Morris S. Levy, a Jewish American film production company owner based in Great Neck, New York.

== Reception ==
On Rotten Tomatoes the film has an approval rating of 35% based on reviews from 34 critics, with an average rating of 4.88/10. The website's consensus states: "Descent has the potential to make a statement about sexual violence, but falls flat by focusing on revenge rather than Rosario Dawson's emotional state." On Metacritic, the film has a score of 45 out of 100 based on reviews from 10 critics, indicating "mixed or average" reviews.

Matt Zoller Seitz of The New York Times wrote: "Hard to watch but essential to see, Descent is at once realistic and rhetorical, and driven throughout by righteous anger that comes from an honest place."
