= Give Me Liberty (2019 film) =

2019 film

- US film poster
- Directed by: Kirill Mikhanovsky
- Written by: Alice Austen; Kirill Mikhanovsky
- Produced by: Val Abel; Alice Austen; Wally Hall
- Starring: Chris Galust; Lauren "Lolo" Spencer; Maxim Stoyanov; Darya Ekamasova; Zoya Makhlina; Sheryl Sims-Daniels; Anna Maltova; Arkady Basin; Steve Wolski; Michelle Casper; Ben Derfel
- Cinematography: Wyatt Garfield
- Edited by: Kirill Mikhanovsky
- Distributed by: Music Box Films; Wild Bunch SA
- Release dates: January 24, 2019 (Sundance); August 23, 2019 (US)
- Running time: 111 minutes
- Country: United States
- Languages: English; Russian
- Box office: $624,152

Give Me Liberty is a 2019 American comedy drama directed by Kirill Mikhanovsky. The film had its world premiere on the opening night of the Sundance Film Festival on January 24, 2019. The film was screened in the Directors' Fortnight section at the 2019 Cannes Film Festival.

The film stars Chris Galust, Lauren "Lolo" Spencer, and Maxim Stoyanov.

== Summary ==
Vic is an adrift twentysomething residing in Milwaukee, working as a medical transport driver and living with his senile grandfather. The film chronicles a single, extremely chaotic day in his life. Vic is constantly late in picking up and dropping off his motley crew of clientele, though it's sometimes due to his own shortcomings but often because he's tasked with enough work for an entire team of people, and each of his disabled clients require specific care. Vic has a strong rapport with each of his clients, and cares deeply for them.

Vic meets and develops a romantic connection with Tracy, a young woman around his age who has ALS, although their dynamic is initially adversarial. He also befriends conman Dima. When the planned transportation does not arrive to shuttle Vic's grandfather and his group of elderly Russian friends to a funeral, Vic reluctantly decides to shuttle them to the funeral, which enrages Tracy. She reports him to his employer, and afterwards the pair get into the first of many arguments. Vic shuttles everyone to and from the funeral as well as shuttling Tracy around town to her appointments and meetings.

Mayhem ensues throughout the day as circumstances constantly collapse and murphys law follows them to each destination. Dima inadvertently sends one of the elderly Russians into diabetic shock after stealing and eating her chocolate, which further delays the group.

Throughout the film Vic has many conversations with his clients and new companions about the meaning of life, hope, despair, and a laundry list of other philosophical topics, though the film is bookended with words of wisdom from a particularly fatherly client of Vics, who tells him despite life's shortcomings, it is beautiful and worth living.

Vic meets up with his mother and sister, who he has something of an estranged relationship with. His mother encourages him to find a sense of direction in his life. His boss also comes within an inch of terminating his employment, but decides to give Vic another chance. He also meets and shares a meal with some of Tracy's family.

Violent protests are taking place around Milwaukee and the films climax shows the group getting caught in the crossfires of one, though they all make it out alive. The film ends with Vic shuttling Tracy back home, with badinage and warmth now existing between the two.

== Cast ==
- Chris Galust as Vic
- Lauren "Lolo" Spencer as Tracy
- Maxim Stoyanov as Dima
- Darya Ekamasova as Sasha
- Zoya Makhlina as Vic's Mom
- Sheryl Sims-Daniels as Tracy's Mom
- Anna Maltova as Anna
- Arkady Basin as Vic's Grandpa
- Michael Earvin as the Cadillac Man

== Reception ==
=== Critical response ===
On Rotten Tomatoes, the film has a rating of 89% based on 37 reviews, with an average rating of 7.1/10. The site's critical consensus reads: "Give Me Liberty expertly juggles resonant themes and a madcap series of events to produce a chaotic comedy with heart."

Writing in The New York Times, Manohla Dargis described Give Me Liberty as “a jolt of a movie, an anarchic deadpan comedy that evolves into a romance just around the time the story explodes…It’s irresistible,” while Variety called it “a boisterous, free-wheeling joyride.”

Despite the films nomination for Best Editing at the Independent Spirit Awards, the editing was a frequent point of contention with critics. Matt Fagerholm of RogerEbert.com. wrote "It’s a pity that many of her [Lolo Spencer's] most affecting scenes are fragmented by Mikhanovsky’s tirelessly visceral editing, which is so restless that it causes some key sequences—particularly the climax—to verge on incoherence

=== Accolades ===
The film received four Independent Spirit Award nominations, including for Best Male Lead (Galust), Best Supporting Female Actress (Spencer), Best Editing (Mikhanovsky), and Best Feature Under $500,000 (John Cassavetes Award), winning in the last category.

It was the winner of Macau IFF 2019 (Best International Picture). It was named to the following "Best Of" lists: The Washington Post, The New York Times, the Los Angeles Times, the National Board of Review (Top Ten Independent Films), The Hollywood Reporter, and RogerEbert.com (Sundance Best Performances).

== See also ==
- Film industry in Wisconsin
