= Ainu Mosir =

Japanese Film

- Film poster
- Directed by: Takeshi Fukunaga
- Written by: Takeshi Fukunaga
- Produced by: Eric Nyari; Harue Miyake
- Starring: Kanto Shimokura; Debo Akibe; Emi Shimokura; Toko Miura; Lily Franky
- Cinematography: Sean Price Williams
- Edited by: Keiko Deguchi
- Music by: Clarice Jensen
- Release date: April 2020
- Running time: 84 minutes
- Countries: Japan; United States; China
- Language: Japanese

Ainu Mosir (Ainu: アイヌモシㇼ, lit. 'the land of the Ainu; Hokkaido') is a 2020 Japanese drama film directed by Takeshi Fukunaga. The film follows a young Ainu boy grappling with the tensions between his traditional heritage, modern Japan, and his personal beliefs. It premiered at the Tribeca Film Festival.

== Plot ==
Kanto is a fourteen-year-old Ainu boy living in a small town in Hokkaido. His mother runs an Ainu gift shop after his father’s death. Kanto is disgruntled with life in the town and wishes to move away from it to a big modern city, away from the Ainu people. The town itself is a traditional Ainu community, essentially carrying on the traditions and surviving through the tourism industry.

After his father’s death, Kanto is mentored by Ainu elder Debo (Debo Akibe), who teaches him Ainu traditions. The community is reviving Iomante, a controversial bear-sacrifice ritual, sparking debate among the residents. Kanto discovers and befriends a bear in the forest, forcing him to confront his feelings about the ritual. A Japanese journalist (Lily Franky) visits to document the community and the Iomante rite. Ultimately, Kanto decides he opposes the bear killing.

Kanto finds videotapes of the Iomante rites and watches them. He begins to discover more about Ainu culture, including some of the more mystical elements, and eventually comes to appreciate some of the rites.

== Cast ==
- Kanto – Kanto Shimokura
- Debo – Debo Akibe
- Emi – Emi Shimokura
- Japanese journalist – Lily Franky

== Production ==
The movie was filmed on location in Hokkaido, Japan in 2020. The film runs for 84 minutes.

== Awards and film festivals ==
Ainu Mosir received a number of nominations, and won two awards:

- Guanajuato International Film Festival 2020 – winner – best International Feature competition
- Hainan International Film Festival 2020 – nominee – Future New Talent Award
- Hong Kong Asian Film Festival 2020 – New Talent Award
- Image Awards (NAACP) 2021 – nominee – Outstanding International Motion Picture
- Nippon Connection Japanese Film Festival 2021 – nominee – Visions Jury award and Audience award
- Taipei Film Festival 2020 – nominee – New Talent award
- Tribeca Film Festival 2020 – Special Jury Mention
