= Alice Austen (writer) =

American playwright and screenwriter

- Born: Alice Lawton
- Occupations: playwright; screenwriter; producer; novelist

Alice Austen is an American playwright, screenwriter, producer, and novelist known for writing and producing the critically acclaimed 2019 film Give Me Liberty. She published her debut novel 33 Place Brugmann in 2025.

== Biography ==
Austen grew up in the Pacific Northwest. She attended the University of Oregon in Eugene, where she ran on the women’s track team.

While at Harvard Law School, Austen co-founded the Harvard Human Rights Journal. She represented the Ministry of Industry in Václav Havel’s nascent Czech government. Austen studied creative writing under Seamus Heaney.

Austen is a past resident at the Royal Court Theatre. Her playwrighting credits include Water, La Musica, and Ninth Man Out at Goodman Theater. Water was a 2006-07 season the Jeff Award Nominee. Her credits with Steppenwolf Theatre include Next Stop and George Orwell’s Animal Farm, which was noted for “its removal of Orwell's dystopian story from its overtly British agrarian setting: The famous anthem "Beasts of England" is now rendered as "Beasts of Earth"”, – wrote Chris Jones of The Chicago Tribune. “A remarkable script, solidifies why this novel and its impact reverberates throughout the world today“ (Newcity Stage).

Girls in the Boat, premiered in 2018 at The First Stage Children's Theater, is a “fast-paced script, which mimics the intensity of an actual sporting event. Audiences dare not blink or they might lose track of a gesture or a thread of a conversation” (Shepherd Express).

Austen won the John Cassavetes Award for Give Me Liberty at the 35th Independent Spirit Awards.

She is a co-founder with Kirill Mikhanovsky of Give Me Liberty, Mfg., a Milwaukee-based film and TV production company.

In 2025, she published her debut novel 33 Place Brugmann.

== Filmography ==
Year	Title	Credit	Notes
2019	Give Me Liberty	Screenplay, Producer	
2021	Brighton 4th	Producer	
2022	Happy Birthday Charlie	Producer	

== Awards and nominations ==
Year	Association	Category	Nominated work	Result	Ref
2007	Jeff Awards	New Work – Play	Water, Chicago Dramatists	Nominated	
2020	Independent Spirit Awards	John Cassavetes Award	Give Me Liberty	Won	
2026	National Jewish Book Award	Fiction	33 Place Brugmann	Shortlisted	
2026	Audie Awards	Literary Fiction & Classics	33 Place Brugmann	Nominated	
