= Maxim Stoyanov =

Russian actor

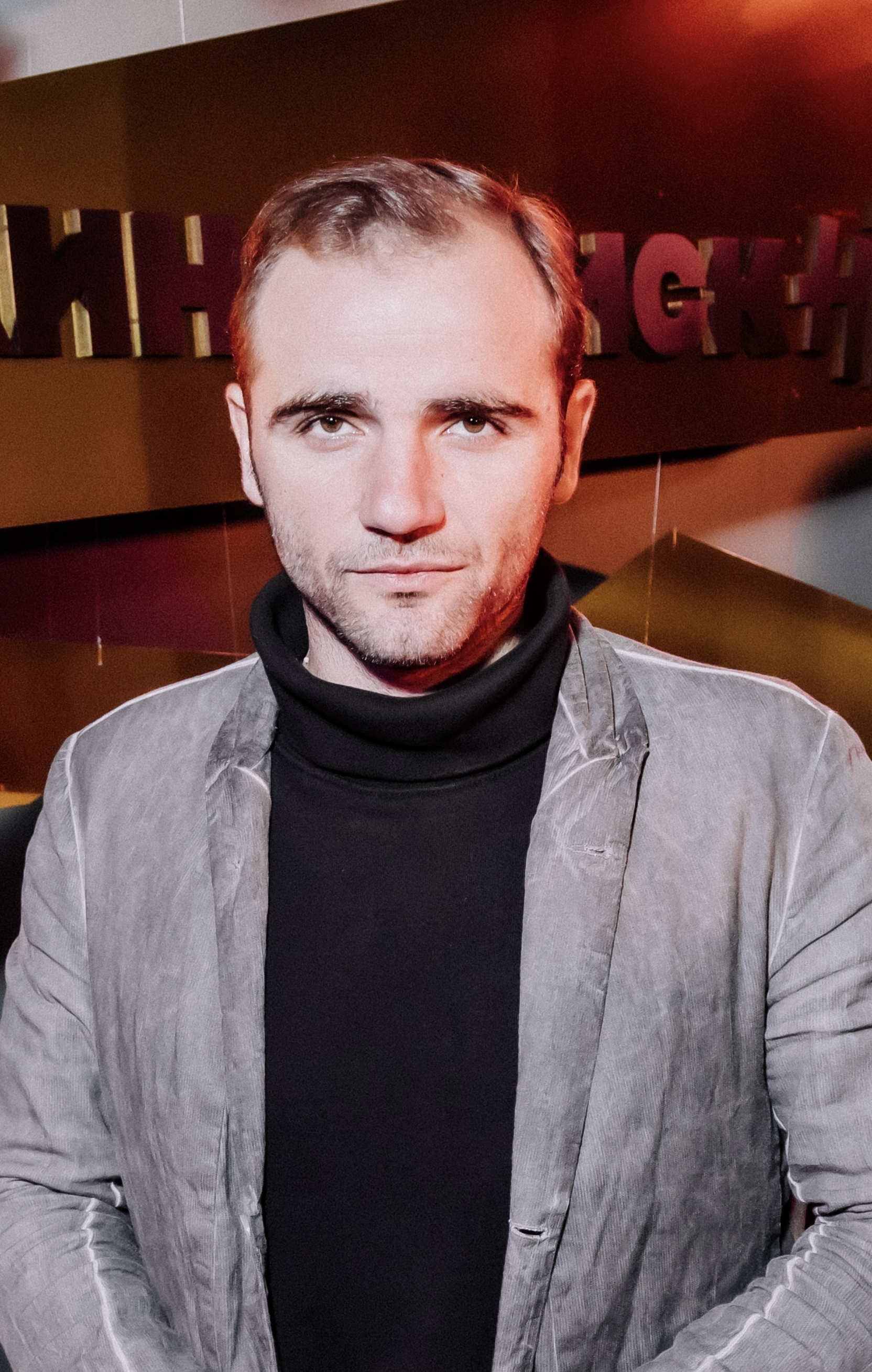
- Born: June 29, 1987 (age 39); Tighina (now Bender)
- Occupation: Actor

Maxim Stoyanov (Russian: Максим Владимирович Стоянов; born June 29, 1987) is a Russian stage and film actor, known for his work in the 2019 American comedy drama Give Me Liberty.

== Biography ==
Stoyanov was born in Tighina, in the Moldavian Soviet Socialist Republic, USSR (now Bender, under the control of Transnistria, which is internationally recognized as part of Moldova) into the family of a train machinist and a factory worker. He studied at the Moscow Art Theatre School under Konstantin Raikin, graduating in 2013.

His first film role was in The Hope Factory, which premiered at the Rotterdam IFF.

Stoyanov garnered critical acclaim for his portrayal of Dima in Give Me Liberty. Justin Chang of The Los Angeles Times likened Stoyanov's character to "a walking mascot for the movie’s big-heartedness; he may be the one character who, no matter how chaotic things get — and they get pretty chaotic — is delighted simply to be there." "The movie's most big-hearted character is a Russian boxer named Dima played by Maxim Stoyanov with a boisterous charm that lights up his every scene." Film Comment compared Stoyanov to a "muscle-bound young James Gandolfini", whose character "has the eagerness of a large Alsatian puppy, and exudes the sort of undiluted force-of-nature comic charisma that filmmakers pray will miraculously fall out of the sky and into their cast." Manohla Dargis of The New York Times placed "fantastic Max Stoyanov" in her 2020 list of Oscar-worthy performances.

In Russia, Stoyanov's work in Give Me Liberty also received critical and public acclaim.

Stoyanov has also appeared in the Russian TV series Shifr by Vera Storozheva and The Missing by Vadim Perelman.

== Selected filmography ==
Year	Title	Role	Notes
2013	Break Loose		
2014	The Hope Factory	Shkarupa	
2017	Loveless	apartment buyer	
2017	The Road to Calvary	Dmitro	
2018	Better than Us	Yuriy	
2019	Give Me Liberty	Dima	
2019–2020	Shifr	Vyacheslav Agarin	
2020	AK-47	Lieutenant	
2021	Captain Volkonogov Escaped	Lependin	
2021	Gerda	Andrej	
2021	The Missing	Yegor Malevich	

== Awards and nominations ==
- 2013: Golden Leaf Award (Zolotoy List) for Best Actor (as Stanley Kowalski in A Streetcar Named Desire) .
- 2023: Pilot TV Series Festival Award for Best Actor in a Series (for Black Sun, directed by Anna Nosatova) .
- 2024: Window to Europe Film Festival — Special Jury Prize for Best Acting Duet (shared with Alina Khodzhevanova for the film Philately) .
- 2024: Cairo International Film Festival — Best Actor Award (for Philately, directed by Natalya Nazarova) .
- 2024: Mayak Film Festival — Best Actor Award (for Jackpot, directed by Alexander Khant) .
