= Donari Braxton =

American filmmaker and writer

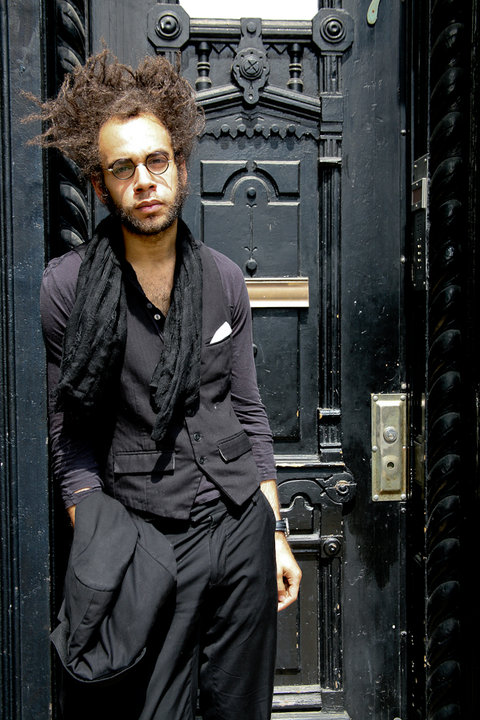

Background information
- Born: Donari Najaro Braxton; November 11, 1982 (age 43)
- Occupations: Writer / director
- Years active: 2000–present
- Website: www.donaribraxton.com

Donari Braxton (born November 11, 1982) is an American filmmaker and writer. His independent narrative films are generally considered experimental, though they have been featured diversely in both film festivals and art film reviews internationally. He is known for creating performance and video art for gallery exhibitions, and with the 2013 launch of the photo/video series "how-to-be-alone.com", began freely releasing and distributing such content online. His work has been supported by NPR, the San Francisco Film Society, the Independent Filmmaker Project, Sundance, Film Independent, and the Berlinale Talents.

In 2006, his first published work, I, a collection of short stories, was met with critical acclaim and became largely associated with the avant-garde or "New Chemical Generation" of contemporary fiction. In 2010, he co-founded with Takeshi Fukunaga the production company "FX-S," which later became "TELEVISION." The company has produced video content for companies such as HBO, Puma, and Marc Jacobs.

In 2015, their first narrative feature, Out of My Hand, premiered at the 2015 Berlin International Film Festival and was theatrically released by Ava DuVernay's ARRAY Pictures in November 2015. Braxton was later nominated for the John Cassavetes Film Independent Spirit Award for his work as writer/producer on the project. In 2016, the San Francisco Film Society announced Braxton's developing feature, Above, would be a science-fiction drama, granting it the 2016 KRF Screenwriting Grant & Fellowship.

Braxton's photography and editorials have been widely published in magazines including GQ, Details, Surface, and Playboy.

== Personal life ==
Braxton was born in New York City and is the son of experimental composer and multi-instrumentalist Anthony Braxton. Like his father, he is known for being an avid chess player and is said to be a chessmaster.

== Select filmography ==
- The Inevitable Me (2009)
- Oh, The Predictable Beasts (2011)
- hItec! (2010)
- Themes from a Rosary (2010)
- The Future of All Fragile Things (2015 ET)
- Out of My Hand (2015)

== Bibliography ==
- The Ballad of Chico Walfer, Announcing (2014)
- No One's Rose, Paul Celan Translations (2006)
- I, Slow Toe Publication (2005)
- On My Generation; Poetry and Politics, Slow Toe Publication (2004)
