= La Musica deuxième =

La Musica Deuxième (English: "The Lover") is a play written by Marguerite Duras, published in 1985 by Éditions Gallimard. It is an extension of the work La Musica.

== The plot ==
La Musica Deuxième tells the story of a man and woman who reunite three years after they have separated, to finalize their divorce. Though they have begun new lives, their history and a shared nostalgia lead them to each other. Through conversation they reconstruct their past, revealing misunderstandings and betrayals.
