= Caroline Kaplan =

American producer

Caroline Kaplan is an American film producer. Her credits include Sorry to Bother You, Me and You and Everyone We Know for Film4, Lonesome Jim, and Sorry, Haters.

Marcel the Shell with Shoes On is a 2021 film that was made by Dean Fleischer Camp, Elisabeth Holm, Andrew Goldman, Paul Mezey and Kaplan. It was nominated for an Oscar in 2023.

== Filmography ==
She was a producer in all films unless otherwise noted.

=== Film ===
Year	Film	Credit
1996	Gray's Anatomy	Executive producer
1999	Boys Don't Cry	Executive producer
1999	Spring Forward	Executive producer
2000	Our Song	Executive producer
2000	Girlfight	Executive producer
2000	Songcatcher	Executive producer
2000	Happy Accidents	Executive producer
2001	Ten Tiny Love Stories	Executive producer
2001	Waking Life	Executive producer
2001	Women in Film	Executive producer
2001	Tape	Executive producer
2001	Chelsea Walls	Executive producer
2001	Final	Executive producer
2001	Monsoon Wedding	Executive producer
2001	World Traveler	Executive producer
2002	Tadpole	Executive producer
2002	Personal Velocity: Three Portraits	Executive producer
2002	Coastlines	Executive producer
2002	Ash Wednesday	Executive producer
2002	Happy Here and Now	Executive producer
2003	Pieces of April	Executive producer
2003	Camp	Executive producer
2003	Kill the Poor	Executive producer
2003	Casa de los Babys	Executive producer
2004	November	Executive producer
2004	Land of Plenty	Executive producer
2005	Lonesome Jim	Executive producer
2005	The Ballad of Jack and Rose	Executive producer
2005	Me and You and Everyone We Know	Executive producer
2005	The Baxter	Executive producer
2005	Pizza	Executive producer
2005	Sorry, Haters	Executive producer
2005	American Gun	Executive producer
2006	The Night Listener	Executive producer
2007	Flakes	Executive producer
2010	Letters to Juliet	
2011	Another Happy Day	Executive producer
2012	Generation Um...	
2014	Boyhood	Associate producer
2014	X/Y	Executive producer
2014	Time Out of Mind	
2016	Norman	Executive producer
2016	Strange Weather	Executive producer
2017	En el séptimo día	
2018	Sorry to Bother You	Executive producer
2018	Diane	
2021	After Yang	
2021	Marcel the Shell with Shoes On	

Thanks

Year	Film	Role
1998	Pi	Thanks
1999	American Virgin	Thanks
1999	The Opportunists	Thanks
2003	The Station Agent	Special thanks
2013	B-Side	Special thanks
2017	Beatriz at Dinner	Special thanks

=== Television ===
Year	Title	Credit	Notes
1995	Inside the Actors Studio	Series producer	
1998	The Art of Influence	Executive producer	Documentary
2000	In Bad Taste	Executive producer	Documentary
2001	iFilm@ifc	Executive producer	
2001	Crossover	Executive producer	Television special
2001	With the Filmmaker: Portraits by Albert Maysles	Executive producer	Documentary
2001	Indie Sex: Taboos	Executive producer	Documentary
2001	First Person	Executive producer	Documentary
2002	BaadAsssss Cinema	Executive producer	Documentary
2002	Focus on Bill Murray	Executive producer	Documentary
2002	Focus on Jim Jarmusch	Executive producer	Documentary
2001−03	Dinner for Five	Executive producer	
2003	Running with the Bulls	Executive producer	Documentary
2011	Untitled Jersey City Project		

Miscellaneous crew

Year	Title	Role	Notes
1990	Real Sex	Production assistant	Documentary
