= Out of My Hand (film) =

2015 film

- Film poster
- Directed by: Takeshi Fukunaga
- Written by: Donari Braxton; Takeshi Fukunaga
- Starring: Bishop Blay
- Release dates: February 7, 2015 (Berlin); November 13, 2015 (US)
- Running time: 90 minutes
- Country: United States
- Language: English

Out of My Hand is a 2015 American drama film directed by Takeshi Fukunaga. It was screened in the Panorama section of the 65th Berlin International Film Festival.

== Cast ==
- Bishop Blay as Cisco
- Duke Murphy Dennis
- Zenobia Kpoto
- Rodney Rogers-Beckley
