= The Very Thought of You (novel) =

2009 novel by Rosie Alison

- Author: Rosie Alison
- Language: English
- Publisher: Alma Books
- Publication place: Great Britain
- English publication date: June 18, 2009
- Media type: Paperback
- Pages: 350
- ISBN: 1-84688-086-6

The Very Thought of You is a 2009 novel by film producer Rosie Alison. Set on the brink of World War II, the novel centres on eight-year-old Anna Sands, a child relocated to a Yorkshire estate. She is quickly drawn into the lives of the couple who have set up their estate as a school.

== Reception ==
The Guardian found The Very Thought of You "enjoyable enough" although "its presence on the (Orange) longlist is perplexing." The Telegraph called it "elegantly constructed" and "a pleasant, competent book"

It was nominated for the 2010 Orange Prize for Fiction.
