= Rules for Living (play) =

Dark comedy

Rules for Living is a dark comedy about family dysfunction and societal norms by Sam Holcroft. Holcroft explores coping with family dynamics and social constructs that limit behaviors through cognitive therapy. The play follows a family preparing for Christmas lunch and tensions begin to rise as they deal with family issues. Each movement, gesture, or voice is dictated over by the play's set of "rules" which the actors must follow to function correctly in Holcroft's world.

== Characters ==
- Matthew: Thirties, boyfriend of Carrie.
- Carrie: Thirties, girlfriend of Matthew.
- Sheena: Forties, married to Adam.
- Adam: Forties, married to Sheena.
- Edith: Sixties, married to Francis, mother of Adam and Matthew.
- Francis: Seventies, married to Edith, father of Adam and Matthew, almost mute and using a wheelchair.
- Emma: Fourteen, daughter of Adam and Sheena, has depression and anxiety.

== Plot ==
=== Act 1 ===
Scene One

Matthew and Carrie, a couple, are talking and unpacking food in the kitchen for Christmas dinner at Matthew's parents' house. Matthew can sense Carrie is upset with something. He pushes for her to say what is on her mind. Carrie says she thinks Sheena, Matthew's sister-in-law, faked laughing at her joke. Matthew explains that it was sincere. Carrie asks what she shouldn't say to make Matthews family upset. Matthew tells Carrie to be less vulgar. Carrie overacts and is angry at Matthew at the end of scene one.

Scene Two

The "rules for living" are introduced to the story.

Rule 1: Matthew must sit to tell a lie.

In the beginning of scene two, Matthew and Carrie make up. Carrie discloses to Matthew she is just nervous about being with his family for the Christmas holiday. Matthew consoles her, while sitting, by saying she'll fit in with his family. Shortly after, they are joined by Sheena, and she says there is still more to be done in preparation for dinner. Sheena and Matthew share jokes which makes Carrie uncomfortable for not being in on the jokes. Near the end of the scene, Sheena discloses she would rather be in this household for Christmas than her own home.

Scene Three

Rule 2: Carrie must stand to tell a joke.

Sheena and Matthew set the table for dinner and discuss Matthew's role as the Major General in the Pirates of Penzance. Sheena remembers seeing Carrie on a fictional period drama, only to have mistaken her for the wrong character. Carrie covers the awkwardness by telling a story of a bad audition. Adam enters having returned home from the market with the wrong milk for his daughter. Sheena is upset.

Scene Four

Rule 3: Sheena must drink to contradict.

Sheena and Adam move on from their small argument. Adam shares his father's beer with the family where it is announced that Sheena has laid off drinking and Adam has actually cut back on smoking. This comes as a surprise to Matthew. A conversation about Francis is cut short when Adam and Sheena begin arguing on whether or not they should stay the night at his parents’ house for Christmas. Edith enters having just returned home from church. She goes over what is left to do in preparations for dinner where she finds that her children and their partners have done things wrong. As the family moves their attention to the tasks at hand and the liquor, Carrie announces Matthew has been made partner at his firm.

Scene Five

Rule 4: Adam must affect an accent to mock.

After hearing the partnership news, Edith wonders how Matthew could become partner at such a young age while Adam still hasn't at his age. Adam, irritated, is forced to share news of his article and is reminded how good of a lawyer he would have made. Adam takes on an accent and says, "I'd have hated to be a famous cricketer- it would've been a real drag!" Matthew asks about the state of his father's health which Edith says is fine. Edith pushes the family to work faster and tells Sheena she hasn't put enough place settings out for lunch; Sheena has forgotten a place for her daughter, but Emma isn't joining them for the meal.

Scene Six

Rule 5: Edith must clean to keep calm.

Shocked her granddaughter isn't joining them, Edith begins to clean and guilt trip Sheena into getting Emma to have lunch with them. Sheena shares that Emma has been diagnosed with chronic fatigue syndrome and that they've been visiting a cognitive behavioral therapy to pinpoint the cause. Matthew tries to get the family to sit and talk about Emma's condition. This only turns into another way for Sheena to blame Adam for not taking their daughter's mental health seriously. Edith is angry and overwhelmed by this news and obsessively cleans the room as she recounts her hardships as a young woman. Alone, Matthew and Sheena talk about a phone call they had a while back where Sheena was upset about her and Adam's marriage.

Scene Seven

Rule 1: Matthew must sit and eat to tell a lie.

Matthew can tell that Sheena is upset with something. So he implores Sheena to tell him. She says that there is trouble with their marriage, and that she wishes someone would talk to Adam. Matthew hugs her, just as Carrie walks in, and Carrie is mad at the fact of Matthew hugging Sheena.

Scene Eight

Rule 2: Carrie must stand and dance around to tell a joke.

Carrie and Matthew are talking at the start of the scene. Then Carrie starts to dance around shouting that she wants to help Edith. Edith comes in because she hears her name. Carrie knocks over an antique thing that Edith's father left to her. Sheena and Adam come in and they say they are going to couple's therapy together.

Scene Nine

Rule 3: Sheena must drink and interrupt to contradict.

Adam and Sheena are discussing couple's therapy together and if they really need to go or not.

Scene Ten

Rule 4: Adam must affect an accent and name-call to mock.

Adam and Sheena are arguing, Edith walks in and they act like nothing is wrong. Edith and Matthew start talking about Carrie. Carrie comes in. Edith is surprised she didn't get a Christmas present. Sheena says they got her one, but they forgot it.

Scene Eleven

Rule 5: Edith must clean and self-medicate to keep calm.

Edith makes a big deal how mothers do not need presents. The family is saying what they got her. Adam and Matthew talk about Sheena. Carrie walks in on Matthew and Adam talking and hears something she should not hear. Sheena and Carrie both want to talk to Matthew alone, and Edith is stopping anyone from leaving. The doorbell then rings. Francis has arrived.

=== Act 2 ===
Scene One

Francis has health problems and only Edith really understands them. Everyone is telling Francis their good news. Edith says that Francis had a stroke. Matthew and Adam start bickering. There is a little bit of chaos at the end of the scene.

Scene Two

Rule 1: Matthew must sit and eat to tell a lie...until he gets a compliment.

Matthew tells the truth to Carrie about everything. Carrie thinks there is something going on between him and Sheena, he says there is not. Matthew tells Carrie he was going to propose to her.

Scene Three

Rule 2: Carrie must stand and dance around to tell a joke...until she gets a laugh.

Matthew wants to keep the proposal a secret for fear the news will shock his father. Carrie, bound to her rule, keeps making light of the situation and angering Matthew. Trying to avoid certain topics, Edith pushes the family to play the card game, Bedlam. The family criticize and demean one another as they attempt to play the game. Carrie flashes her engagement ring at Sheena in an attempt to anger her to avail. Matthew and Carrie's rules light up when their emotional needs are not met; the two attempt to restrain each other from completing their assigned rules. The scene climaxes in bitter remarks from Adam further suggesting he knows the interest Matthew has for his wife.

Scene Four

Rule 3: Sheena must drink and interrupt to contradict...until she has the last word.

Carrie seems surprised and forgives Matthew for everything. Adam and Edith talk about Francis playing a game. Everyone plays Bedlam. Adam is accused of cheating.

Scene Five

Rule 4: Adam must affect an accent and name-call to mock...until he has deflected blame.

They continue to play Bedlam, while continuing to think Adam is cheating. Matthew takes the blame bringing the game. Adam and Sheena start arguing. Everyone starts eating lunch. Adam and Sheena are arguing. Carrie wants Matthew to tell his family they are engaged. Everyone starts arguing. At the end of the scene Edith yells at everyone.

Scene six

Rule 5: Edith must clean and self-medicate to keep calm...until she gets reassurance.

Everyone starts to say sorry to everyone. Everyone starts arguing again. Matthew gives a long speech how he loves Sheena, Adam says he knew it. Carrie is angry and everyone is arguing even more. Everyone starts physically fighting. Edith flips the table and Adam and Matthew throw food at one another. Emma comes downstairs to see chaos. The adults immediately stop upon sight of Emma and realize what they look like.

Scene Seven

Thirty minutes after the food fight, the adults are gathering themselves. Rules 2, 3, and 4 disappear by the end of the show; leaving Matthew and Edith's rules still live on the board. Edith and Matthew talk. Carrie is calling for a taxi. Carrie says goodbye to Edith. Sheena is waiting for a taxi. Adam says he can change to Sheena, but she does not believe it. Edith cleans the mess.

== History of the play ==
Holcroft was commissioned to write the play for the National Theatre in 2011, however, it took her a year to come up with the concept. According to Holcroft, the idea of the play struck her while drinking coffee in the window of the National Theatre's espresso bar following a meeting with her literary agent.

It was... born out of learning about Cognitive Behavioral Therapy. I'd had lots of it, and I'd wanted to write about it for a long time. And.. and also a sort of love of... em... family comedies and... dinner-party farces. I'd seen lots of them, and I'd seen them in films, and I'd seen them on TV, and I'd seen them at the theatre before, and I... wondered whether or not there could be a marriage between what- the- the- the sort of well-told of the families in a party farce that we're all quite familiar with, and whether or not I could deconstruct that in any way, or... or explain that in any way through Cognitive Behavioral techniques... And I wondered whether there was- I- as an ambition for a play, could I bring together a family and assign each one of them a personality trait or rule, and an underlying core belief that they might be struggling with, and if they lived by that rule throughout the course of the drama very strictly, would they rub up against each other, would they set each other off, would we end up in the inevitable... em... climax of the family dinner party as we've come to expect it, and would I be able to marry the two?

The debut performance occurred at the National Theatre in London from March 24 to July 8, 2015. Red Stitch Actors Theater in Melbourne, Australia performed the play from March to mid April 2017.

== Cast ==
=== London Premiere ===
- Miles Jupp
- Claudie Blakley
- Deborah Findlay
- Maggie Service
- Daisy Waterstone
- Stephen Mangan

== Critical reviews ==
Many of the reviewers noticed that Holcraft's play dealt with comedy in a way to reveal a larger theme about family dysfunction and how people cope with living as well as the "Ayckbourn-esque" feeling as viewers. Similar to the connection to Ayckbourn's work, many reviewers also picked up on the Cognitive Behavioral Theory implemented in the play.

Matt Truman's Variety's review of the March 2015 production at the National Theatre in London believes that the music in the production (by Adrian Sutton) is executed well with the play. At times, however, some of the play's interactions are too deliberate on set. Trueman interpreted the play as a "seriously canny satire." Truman states, "Holcroft not only ridicules our perfectionist culture, but shows the neurosis beneath and lets us feel the stress of its feedback loop ourselves."

Michael Billington's review of the National Theatre production notes, "Like Ayckbourn’s Season’s Greetings, the play confirms that Christmas is often a cue for self-revelatory crisis.... this is an intelligent comedy that leaves us questioning at what point the rules for living we all adopt become a form of entrapment."

Bridget Galton thinks that the play could use a "rethinking." Galton saw that Holcraft seemed "ambivalent" towards Cognitive Behavioral Theory, but the execution could have been different. Galton states, "And while there are sharp jolts of comic recognition, there is also rampant overkill."

Cameron Woodword in The Age (Melbourne, Vic.) stated that the play is "wildly funny...domestic comedy in the mould of Alan Ayckbourn's Seasons Greetings."

Dominic Cavendish, reviewer from The Telegraph reviewed the Dorfman Theatre production. Cavendish pulls out the "Ayckbourn-esque drama" of the performance. Cavendish states, "Rules for Living at times borders on being the funniest and truest comedy I’ve seen in ages, but it’s also the strangest and most strained. It shouldn’t really work at all. That it does, just about, is a testament to the talented array of actors." Cavendish picks up on themes of Cognitive Behavioral Theory. Cavendish states, "A serious theme about Cognitive Behavioural Therapy, and the way we get stuck in and must break free from negative patterns of thought. The contrivance, observed by us, not commented on by the players, embodies a painful, dysfunctional reality.

Kate Herbert of Herald Sun reviews thought it had an Aychbourn-like feel and explored the Cognitive Behavioral Theory in Holcroft's play. While the complex characters were apparent on stage, Herbert states, "if the performances were reined in, the more complex issues of the dynamics of human behaviour might be clearer in Rules for Living, but the more reflective moments of the final scenes in this three-hour production come too late."

Cameron Woodhead from The Sydney Morning Herald wrote a positive review. Woodhead states, "Kim Farrant directs a strong ensemble with verve, allowing mayhem to develop from naturalism that's attractive and sharply grounded in familiar typologies. And the way she can puncture the hilarity with moments of poignancy... – really raises the theatrical stakes.

Natasha Tripney of The Stage notices the Cognitive Behavioral Theory as well. Tripney states, "But despite that late, delicious eruption of anarchy, there’s something rather laboured about the production as a whole – its tread is heavy."
