= Bookberry =

Bookberry (Russian: Букбери) was a chain of bookstores based in Moscow, Russia, and with stores in that city and in Yekaterinburg.

== History ==
The chain was launched by private investors in 2003 including Alexander Mamut (36%), Tim Waterstone, Roman Lola, Dmitry Kushaev and Maxim Scherbakov. Roman Lola was CEO until 2004 when Mamut bought out his shares, along with the shares of Kushaev and Scherbakov.

Most Bookberry stores were opened 24 hours a day.

In February 2008, a company controlled by Oleg Deripaska, Rainko, bought a controlling stake, buying out Lola, Kushaev and Scherbakov entirely. By late 2008, the chain comprised 13 stores (up from 10 in late 2005), located in large shopping malls and on a number of major streets. The CEO departed in January 2009, and by March 2009 five stores were closed, including the last-opened, on Tverskaya Street.

On 2 March 2009, the company applied for bankruptcy protection. Its financial failure was precipitated by the bankruptcy of Deripaska. The Tverskaya store in Moscow closed in 2009.
