= Talia Lugacy =

American film director, writer and producer)

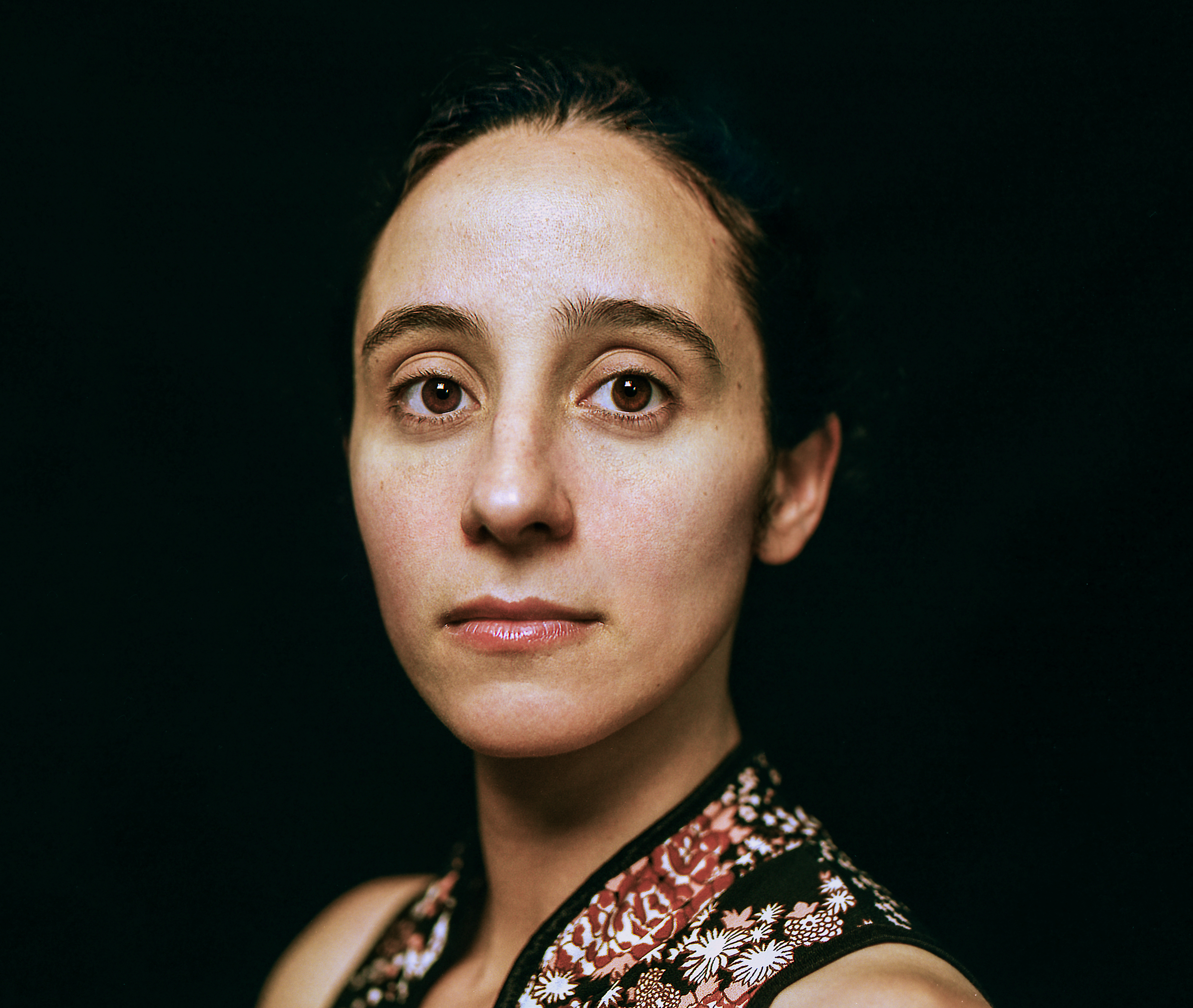
- Born: New York City, U.S.
- Occupations: Director, writer, producer, actress
- Years active: 2005–present
- Spouse: Tom Noonan (m. 2010–2015)

Talia Lugacy is an American film director, writer and producer. She is best known for her work on the films Descent and This Is Not a War Story. Her upcoming feature film is titled: Ruby Road.

== Life and career ==
Lugacy was born in Brooklyn, New York to Moroccan Jewish and Greek parents. She applied to New York University when she was 14.

She graduated from New York University Tisch School of the Arts. She is an assistant professor of Screen Studies at Eugene Lang College of Liberal Arts at The New School.

Lugacy's debut feature film, Descent, premiered at the Tribeca Film Festival in 2007 and it was a New York Times Critics' Pick. In 2021, her second feature film This Is Not a War Story, premiered at 2021 SF Indie Fest, where it won the Audience Award for Best Narrative Feature. She is also slated to direct the upcoming feature film Dark Days & the Dawn.

Lugacy's upcoming feature film, Ruby Road, was shot in 2025 and is expected for a 2026 premiere. The film stars Frances Fisher, Will Patton, and Lauren Holly. Lugacy and her forthcoming film were selected by U.S. in Progress at their 2025 event in Poland, receiving three awards for VFX and sound post-production. The feature was also a recipient of the 2025 SFFILM Rainin Grant in San Francisco.

In 2025, she was named one of the Film-Video recipients of the Guggenheim Fellowship.

== Filmography ==
Year	Film	Director	Writer	Producer	Note
2005	Little Black Dress	Yes	Yes	Yes	Short film
2007	Descent	Yes	Yes	Yes	Feature film
2021	This Is Not a War Story	Yes	Yes	Yes	Feature film
TBA	Ruby Road	Yes	Yes	Yes	Feature film
TBA	Dark Days & the Dawn	Yes	Yes	Yes	Feature film

=== As actress ===
- 2014: The Shape of Something Squashed
- 2021: This Is Not a War Story
- TBAL Ruby Road

== Awards and nominations ==
Year	Result	Award	Category	Work	Ref.
2021	Winner	Atlanta Underground Film Festival	Jury Prize Best Feature Narrative	This Is Not a War Story	
2021	Winner	Urbanworld Film Festival	Jury Prize Best Feature Narrative	This Is Not a War Story	
2021	Winner	Workers Unite Film Festival	Jury Prize Best Feature Narrative	This Is Not a War Story	
2021	Winner	Cinelounge Film Festival	Jury Prize Best Feature Narrative	This Is Not a War Story	
2021	Winner	San Francisco Indie Fest	Audience Award, Best Feature Narrative	This Is Not a War Story	
2021	Winner	Indie Street Film Festival	Audience Award, Best Feature Narrative	This Is Not a War Story	
2021	Winner	Woods Hole Film Festival	Audience Award, Best Feature Narrative	This Is Not a War Story	
2021	Winner	New York Women in Film & Television	Best Director	This Is Not a War Story	
2021	Winner	Urbanworld Film Festival	Best Director	This Is Not a War Story	
2021	Winner	Portland Film Festival	Best Director	This Is Not a War Story	
2021	Winner	Tallgrass Film Festival	Best Director	This Is Not a War Story	
2022	Winner	Blackbird Film Festival	Jury Prize Best Feature Narrative	This Is Not a War Story	
2022	Nominated	Independent Spirit Awards	John Cassavetes Award	This Is Not a War Story	
