= Takeshi Fukunaga =

Japanese filmmaker and director (born 1982)

- 福永 壮志
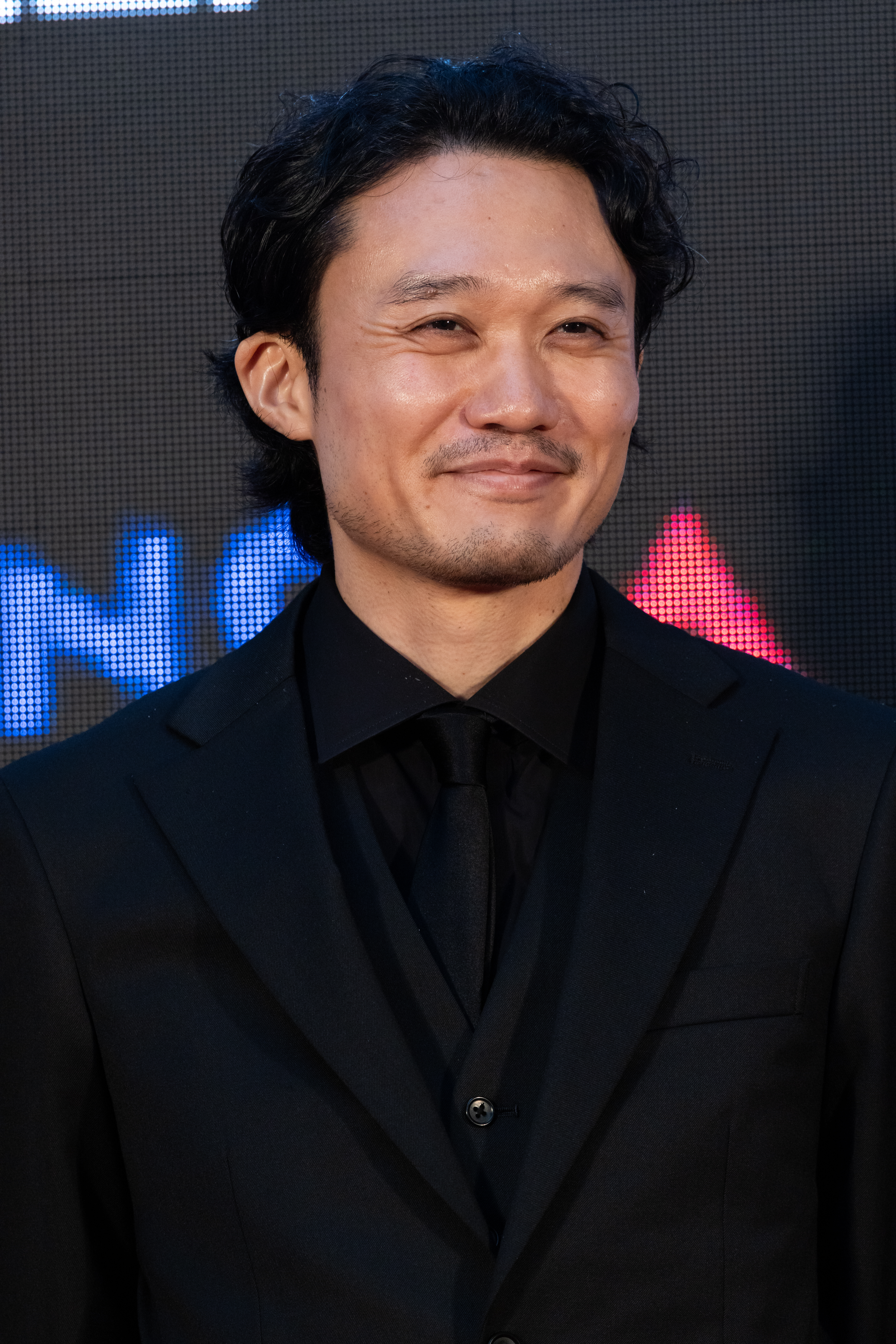
- Fukunaga in 2024
- Born: September 10, 1982 (age 43); Date, Hokkaido, Japan
- Occupations: Filmmaker; director
- Spouse: Masami Nagasawa (m. 2026)

Takeshi Fukunaga (福永 壮志, Fukunaga Takeshi; born September 10, 1982) is a Japanese filmmaker and director.

His first feature film, Out of My Hand (2015) premiered in the Panorama section at the 65th Berlin International Film Festival and won the US Fiction Award at the 2015 Los Angeles Film Festival. He won the George C. Lin Emerging Filmmaker Award at the 2015 San Diego Asian Film Festival.

The film was later released worldwide through Ava DuVernay’s distribution company, ARRAY. Takeshi was nominated for the John Cassavetes Award at the 2016 Independent Spirit Awards. In 2017, he was selected for The Residence by Cannes Film Festival's Cinéfondation to develop his second feature film.

His second feature film, Ainu Mosir (2020) won Special Jury Mention in International Narrative Competition at Tribeca Film Festival, and Best Film in International Feature Competition at Gunajuato International Film Festival.

== Personal life ==
On January 1, 2026, Fukunaga announced his marriage to actress Masami Nagasawa.

== Filmography ==
=== Film ===
- Out of My Hand (2015)
- Ainu Mosir (2020)
- Mountain Woman (2023)
- Ainu Puri (Documentary)(2024)

=== Television ===
- Tokyo Vice (2024), Episode 5, 6
- Shōgun (2024), Episode 7 "Chapter Seven: A Stick of Time"
