= Caldecot Chubb =

American film producer

- Born: March 3, 1950 (age 75); New York City, New York, United States
- Occupation: Film producer
- Children: 2

Caldecot "Cotty" Chubb (born March 3, 1950) is an American film producer who has produced films such as Eve's Bayou, Hoffa, Unthinkable, The Crow, Dark Blue and Pootie Tang. He won the Independent Spirit Award for Best First Feature in 1997 for Eve's Bayou and was a nominee for To Sleep with Anger in 1991. Both of those films have been admitted to the National Film Archive of the Library of Congress.

== Career ==
Since the early 1980s, Chubb has worked in Los Angeles as a producer and senior production executive supervising the development and production of several dozen films in addition to his own. From 1988 to 1992, he worked at Pressman Film Corp., from 1994 to 2003 at Alphaville, and at Michael London's Groundswell Productions from 2006 to 2007. Currently, Chubb is a producer on his own account through ChubbCo, working in a wide variety of financing and distribution environments.

Prior to his work in the film business, Chubb also built a small business in New York publishing fine art photography.

=== Films ===
Chubb has personally produced ten films. Beginning with Cherry 2000, in 1988 starring Melanie Griffith; Waiting for the Light, in 1990 with Shirley MacLaine and Teri Garr; To Sleep with Anger also released in 1990 from director Charles Burnett; Hoffa in 1992 starring Jack Nicholson and directed by and co-starring Danny DeVito; Eve's Bayou the 1997 debut picture by Kasi Lemmons starring Samuel L. Jackson; Pootie Tang released in 2001 by Paramount starring Chris Rock; Dark Blue in 2002 starring Kurt Russell and directed by Ron Shelton; Believe in Me, starring Jeffrey Donovan, Samantha Mathis, Bruce Dern and Heather Matarrazzo, released by IFC Films in 2007; Unthinkable in 2010 starring Samuel L. Jackson, Michael Sheen, and Carrie-Anne Moss, released by Sony Pictures Home Entertainment; and his tenth movie, The Dinner, written and directed by Oren Moverman, and starring Richard Gere, Laura Linney, Steve Coogan and Rebecca Hall. The film premiered in competition at Berlinale in 2017, and was released by The Orchard. It is an adaptation of Herman Koch's Dutch novel Het Diner, a worldwide best-selling psychological thriller.

Previously, he was executive producer on Ed Harris's Appaloosa, based on the Robert Parker novel, starring Ed Harris, Viggo Mortensen, Renée Zellweger and Jeremy Irons (WB/New Line, 2008); Michael Almereyda's "Tonight at Noon," starring Chiwetel Ejiofor, Lauren Ambrose, Connie Nielsen and Rutger Hauer; and Alex Proyas's The Crow, starring Brandon Lee, which Miramax released in 1994. He was associate producer on the Taviani brothers' Good Morning, Babylon.

Between 2012 and 2014, Chubb was executive producer of five films: I Nostri Ragazzi, an Italian adaptation of the Koch novel, directed by Ivano De Matteo, which premiered at the 2014 Venice Film Festival; Het Diner, a Dutch adaptation of the Koch novel written and directed by Menno Meyjes (2012); Flying Home, an English-language film from Belgian writer-director Dominique DeRudddere starring Jamie Dornan (2012); and Parts Per Billion, by writer-director Brian Horiuchi, starring Frank Langella, Gena Rowlands, Rosario Dawson, Josh Hartnett, and Penn Badgely (2012). In 2022 and 2024 he executive-produced two new adaptations of "The Dinner," from Brazil and South Korea.

=== Television ===
In television he was executive producer of five films: The National Tree for Hallmark in 2009, Banshee (Oxygen Network, 2006), Everyday People (HBO Films, 2004), Don't Look Back for HBO in 1996, and Avalanche for Fox in 1994; and was an executive producer of the four-hour mini-series Attila for Studios USA and the USA Network, which aired 2001.

=== Digital publishing ===
While continuing his movie and television work, in 2011 he partnered with Ron Martinez, founder and CEO of Invention Arts LLC, to create Aerbook, a digital publishing environment for authors and creators to make, publish and share media-rich, optionally interactive ebooks and apps designed for the fast-growing tablet marketplace. The company pivoted to enabling digital commerce in media-rich streams and was sold to Ingram Content Group in 2015.

=== Other work ===
From 1999 to 2010, Chubb was the executive director of the Eggleston Artistic Trust, managing the career and business of the distinguished American artist and photographer, William Eggleston. In 2008 he produced "William Eggleston’s ‘Stranded in Canton,’" a documentary created by Robert Gordon from Eggleston’s videotapes originally shot in 1973.

In addition, Chubb has taught producing as an adjunct professor at the University of North Carolina School of the Arts in 2015, at NYU Tisch School of the Arts in 2016 and since 2017 at the American Film Institute Conservatory.

== Personal life ==
Chubb is a member of the Academy of Motion Picture Arts and Sciences, in the Producer Branch. He is married with two daughters.
