= A Normal Family =

2023 South Korean drama film

- Theatrical release poster
- Hangul: 보통의 가족
- Hanja: 普通의 家族
- Lit.: An ordinary family
- RR: Botongui gajok
- MR: Pot'ongŭi kajok
- Directed by: Hur Jin-ho
- Written by: Park Eun-kyo; Park Joon-seok
- Based on: The Dinner by Herman Koch
- Produced by: Kim Won-kuk
- Starring: Sul Kyung-gu; Jang Dong-gun; Kim Hee-ae; Claudia Kim
- Cinematography: Go Rak-sun
- Edited by: Kim Hyung-joo
- Music by: Cho Sung-woo
- Production companies: Hive Media Corp.; Higround
- Distributed by: Hive Media Corp; Mindmark
- Release dates: September 14, 2023 (TIFF); October 9, 2024 (South Korea)
- Running time: 109 minutes
- Country: South Korea
- Language: Korean
- Box office: US$6.4 million

A Normal Family (Korean: 보통의 가족) is a 2023 South Korean psychological thriller film directed by Hur Jin-ho and written by Park Eun-kyo and Park Joon-seok, based on the 2009 novel The Dinner by Herman Koch. It is the fourth film adaptation of the novel, following the 2013 Dutch film Het Diner, the 2014 Italian film I nostri ragazzi, and the 2017 American film The Dinner. The film stars Sul Kyung-gu, Jang Dong-gun, Kim Hee-ae, and Claudia Kim. It centres on two wealthy families who meet for dinner to discuss and decide how to handle a violent crime committed by their children.

The film premiered at the 2023 Toronto International Film Festival on September 14, 2023, and was released in South Korea on October 9, 2024.

== Plot ==
A road rage incident leaves a man dead after a sports car driver runs him over while attempting to escape an attack with a baseball bat. The victim's daughter is critically injured and undergoes surgery performed by the principled doctor Jae-gyu, while his older brother, the successful defense lawyer Jae-wan, represents the driver in court. Although the case provokes widespread public outrage, Jae-wan argues that his client panicked and momentarily lost control of the vehicle, seeking a conviction for manslaughter rather than murder. The brothers' contrasting moral outlooks are also reflected in their personal lives. Jae-gyu lives modestly with his wife, Yeon-kyung, their teenage son Si-ho, and their mother, who has dementia, while Jae-wan enjoys a more affluent life with his younger second wife, Ji-soo, their infant child, and his academically gifted daughter Hye-yoon from his first marriage.

During a family dinner, long-standing tensions surface as the brothers disagree over placing their mother in a nursing home and over Jae-wan's request that Jae-gyu persuade the victim's family to reach a settlement with his client. While the adults dine, Hye-yoon and Si-ho attend a party. Feeling isolated, Si-ho becomes intoxicated, and on their way home the two teenagers viciously assault a homeless man, leaving him critically injured. The attack is captured on CCTV and broadcast on television. Yeon-kyung notices blood on Si-ho's clothes and realizes that the attackers shown in the footage are her son and Hye-yoon, quietly washing the evidence in panic. Around the same time, Hye-yoon indirectly confesses the incident to Jae-wan by claiming it happened to someone she knows, leading him to recognize that his daughter was involved.

Jae-wan shares his suspicions with Jae-gyu, who confronts Si-ho in a rage and nearly turns him over to the police before stopping himself. After speaking honestly with his son, Jae-gyu reluctantly decides to conceal the crime alongside Yeon-kyung. Meanwhile, Jae-wan, who had initially dismissed the homeless victim's life as insignificant, begins to experience growing guilt. After the victim dies from his injuries, he secretly attends the funeral and later leaves money at the victim's home. His unease deepens when Hye-yoon calls to celebrate her admission to a prestigious overseas university and reacts to the man's death with indifference, seeing it only as an inconvenience before asking about a reward for her achievement.

Before another family dinner, Si-ho visits Jae-wan's house, while Hye-yoon excitedly asks her father to buy her a car. Reviewing footage from a home security camera, Jae-wan overhears the teenagers privately discussing the assault. They rationalize their actions by claiming the homeless man would have died soon anyway and openly acknowledge that, as juveniles, they are unlikely to face serious consequences. Realizing that neither child feels genuine remorse and believing that shielding them will only ensure they continue down the same path, Jae-wan announces during dinner that he intends to take Hye-yoon to the police and plays the recording for the others. He argues that confessing now is their "golden time" to change before it is too late.

Jae-gyu desperately tries to dissuade his brother, even offering to persuade the family of Jae-wan's road rage client to accept a settlement if he remains silent. When Jae-wan refuses, Jae-gyu threatens to kill him if he reports the children and storms out with Yeon-kyung. As Jae-wan and Ji-soo wait outside the restaurant, Ji-soo briefly returns inside after forgetting her phone. Moments later, a black car accelerates into Jae-wan, fatally striking him. Ji-soo emerges in horror to discover that the driver is Jae-gyu, while Yeon-kyung sits in the vehicle in stunned silence. The film concludes with memories of the extended family posing happily together for a photograph, contrasting their former unity with the irreversible consequences of their choices.

== Cast ==
- Sul Kyung-gu as Yang Jae-wan
- Jang Dong-gun as Yang Jae-gyu
- Kim Hee-ae as Lee Yeon-kyung, Jae-gyu's wife
- Claudia Kim as Ji-soo, Jae-wan's second wife and Hye-yoon's stepmother
- Hong Ye-ji as Yang Hye-yoon, Jae-wan's daughter
- Kim Jung-chul as Yang Si-ho, Jae-gyu and Yeon-kyung's son
- Byun Joong-hee as Jae-wan and Jae-gyu's mother
- Choi Ri as Seon-ju
- Yoo Su-bin as Hyung-cheol
- Yoo In-sun as Na-rae's father
- Roh Jae-won as a doctor

== Release ==
The film was officially invited to the Gala Presentation section of the 48th Toronto International Film Festival, where it was screened on September 14, 2023 worldwide, and was invited to 19 overseas film festivals, including the 26th Udine Far East Film Festival, the 18th London Korean Film Festival, the 35th Palm Springs International Film Festival, and the 26th Taipei Film Festival. It won Best Screenplay Award at the Director's Fortnight at the 44th Fantasporto International Film Festival and the Screenplay Award at the 39th Mons International Film Festival. It had domestic premiere in the 'Korean Cinema Today - Special Premiere' at the 29th Busan International Film Festival in October 2024, before its release in theaters.

== Accolades ==
Award	Year	Category	Recipient(s)	Result	Ref.
Baeksang Arts Awards	2025	Best Supporting Actress	Claudia Kim	Won	
Blue Dragon Film Awards	2025	Best Actor	Sul Kyung-gu	Nominated	
Blue Dragon Film Awards	2025	Best New Actress	Hong Ye-ji	Nominated	
Buil Film Awards	2025	Best Supporting Actress	Claudia Kim	Nominated	
Buil Film Awards	2025	Best New Actress	Hong Ye-ji	Nominated	
Buil Film Awards	2025	Yu Hyun-mok Film Art Award	Jang Dong-gun	Won	
Director's Cut Awards	2025	Best Director (Film)	Hur Jin-ho	Nominated	
