= Lawrence Inglee =

American film producer (born 1973)

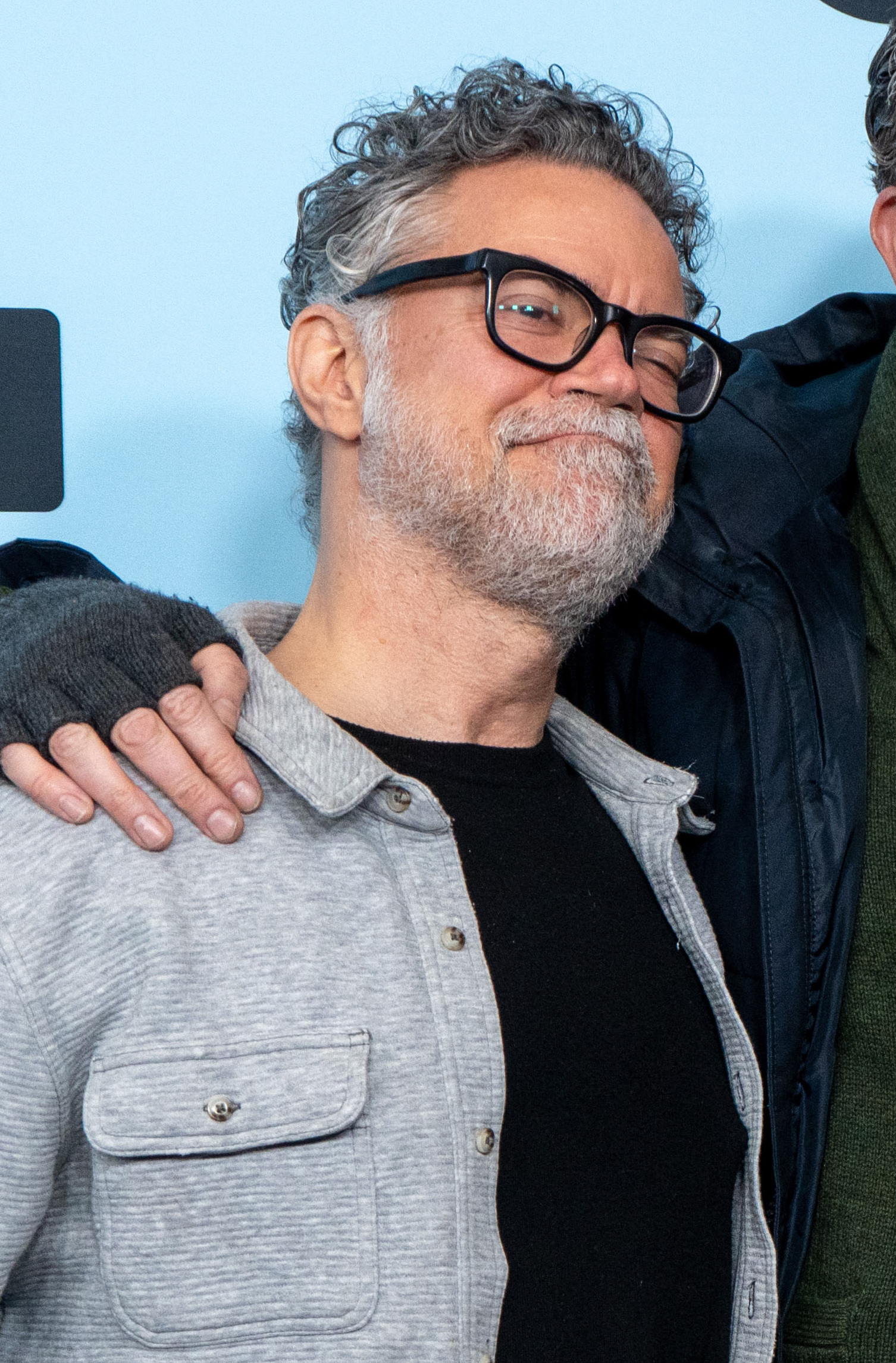
- Inglee in 2025
- Born: October 20, 1973 (age 52); Vermont
- Education: Newhouse School of Public Communications (BA)
- Occupation: Film producer

Lawrence Inglee (born October 20, 1973) is an American film producer. Inglee is the President of Production at Spectrevision and previously served as President of Production for Mosaic Film. He has worked as a producer on a number of films, including The Messenger by director Oren Moverman and The Day After Tomorrow by director Roland Emmerich.

== Life and career ==
Inglee was born in Vermont. He holds a Bachelor's Degree from the Newhouse School of Communication at Syracuse University and began his career in entertainment with a position at Imagine Entertainment before joining The Mark Gordon Company.

He spent eight years with The Mark Gordon Company, eventually becoming head of production. While there, he oversaw numerous projects, including The Day After Tomorrow, Winter Passing and the 2009 film The Messenger, directed by Oren Moverman and starring Woody Harrelson, Ben Foster and Samantha Morton, and "Source Code" (2011). Inglee then went on to become President of Production at Mosaic Film.

In September 2008, Inglee became President of production company Lightstream Pictures, to oversee all production and development efforts. In 2009 Lightstream announced two projects that will be produced by Inglee; Max Rose, starring Jerry Lewis and written and directed by Daniel Noah, and The Lost: A Search for Six of Six Million, an adaptation of the best-selling memoir of the same name by Daniel Mendelsohn, to be directed by famed French director Jean-Luc Godard.

In 2011, Inglee produced Rampart, Lightstream Pictures' first feature film, reuniting director Oren Moverman and stars Woody Harrelson and Ben Foster. The critically acclaimed film was co-written by James Ellroy and also stars Robin Wright, Brie Larson, Sigourney Weaver, Anne Heche, Cynthia Nixon, Ice Cube, Ned Beatty, and Steve Buscemi.

In 2011, Variety named Inglee as one of the "10 Producers To Watch".

Inglee served as producer of the Oren Moverman directed Time Out of Mind, starring Richard Gere.

== Filmography ==
Associate producer

- The Day After Tomorrow (2004)
- Winter Passing (2005)

Producer

- The Messenger (2009)
- Rampart (2011)
- Max Rose (2012)
- Time Out of Mind (2014)
- Norman (2016)
- Swiss Army Man (2016)
- Junction 48 (2016)
- The Ticket (2017)
- The Dinner (2017)
- The Tale (2018)
- Lost Girls & Love Hotels (2020)
- Adopting Audrey (2021)
- Julie Last Name (2024)
- Rabbit Trap (2025)
- The Land of Nod (post-production)

Executive producer

- 2.22 (2017)
- The Wanting Mare (2020)
- Welcome Space Brothers (2023)
- Dawning (2025)

== Recognition ==
=== Awards and nominations ===
- 2009, Won AFI Film Award for 'Film of the Year' for The Messenger
- 2010, nominated for Independent Spirit Award for 'Best First Feature' for The Messenger
