= Ekaterina Samsonov =

American model and actress (born 2003)

- Екатерина Самсонова
- Born: January 1, 2003 (age 22); New York City, U.S.
- Occupation(s): Model, actress
- Years active: 2005–present

Ekaterina Samsonov (Note: Russian: Екатерина Самсонова, romanized: Yekaterina Samsonova) (born January 1, 2003) is an American-Russian model and actress.

== Early life ==
Samsonov was born in New York City, the daughter of Ukrainian mother Galina and Russian father Alexander.

She holds both American and Russian citizenship.

== Career ==
As a model, Samsonov has worked with DKNY, H&M, Gap, J.Crew, Macy's, J. C. Penney, and Hewlett-Packard.

In 2017, she co-starred in Lynne Ramsay’s neo-noir crime psychological thriller You Were Never Really Here, portraying Nina Votto, the thirteen-year-old daughter of a New York State Senator who is kidnapped by a human-trafficking ring.

== Filmography ==
=== Films ===
| Year | Title | Role | Director(s) |
|---|---|---|---|
| 2015 | Anesthesia | Angie | Tim Blake Nelson |
| 2016 | The Ticket | Carla | Ido Fluk |
| 2017 | Wonderstruck | Hannah | Todd Haynes |
| 2017 | You Were Never Really Here | Nina Votto | Lynne Ramsay |
| 2019 | The Wait (short) | | Thibaut Buccellato |

=== Television ===
| Year | Title | Role | Notes |
|---|---|---|---|
| 2013 | Saturday Night Live | One Direction Fan | uncredited |
| 2014 | Mozart in the Jungle | Alice | Episode: "You Go to My Head" |
