= Wolverine (podcast) =

Scripted podcast from Marvel Comics

- Genre: Superhero
- Language: English

Creative team
- Written by: Benjamin Percy
- Directed by: Brendan Baker

Cast and voices
- Starring: Richard Armitage
- Voices: Richard Armitage

Production
- Production: Chloe Prasinos (sound design); Chloe Wilson; Daniel Fink; Jenny Radelet; (producers)
- Length: 30 minutes

Publication
- No. of seasons: 2
- No. of episodes: 20
- Original release: March 12, 2018 – September 1, 2019
- Provider: Stitcher Premium

Reception
- Cited for: Best Podcasts of 2018 by Apple; iHeartRadio Award for Best Scripted Podcast; 2019 Webby Award for Original Music/Sound Design

Related
- Website: www.wolverinepodcast.com

Marvel's Wolverine (subtitled The Long Night for Season 1 and The Lost Trail for Season 2) is an audio drama podcast series featuring the Marvel Comics character Wolverine. The show is Marvel's first scripted podcast produced by Marvel New Media and Stitcher. Marvel had previously retold comic book stories through audio in 1974 with a Fantastic Four radio series and a Spider-Man: Rock Reflections of a Superhero concept album. It was dubbed one of the Best Podcasts of 2018 by Apple while also winning the 2019 iHeartRadio Award for Best Scripted Podcast. A comic adaptation was published by Marvel due to the podcast's success.

In 2021, Marvel New Media and SiriusXM announced Marvel's Wastelanders, a series of podcasts set in a version of the Old Man Logan universe. Marvel's Wastelanders: Wolverine launched in June 2022, featuring Robert Patrick as the voice of Wolverine.

== Premise ==
=== The Long Night ===
Federal agents are led to the fictional town of Burns, Alaska working a serial murder case. Logan is the main suspect. The agents will uncover Logan's dual identity and the corruption in the small town. Logan is attempting to escape from society and over the course of the series recover some of his lost memories. He is, however, drawn to execute "frontier justice." Located nearby is the Aurora cult, who may or may not have power or be involved in the murders.

=== The Lost Trail ===
The second season, The Lost Trail, finds Wolverine in New Orleans, looking for an ex-lover when humans and mutants start disappearing. Assisted by a young boy, Logan investigates the disappearances, which brings them to encounter "biker gangs", "Cajun thieves", one of whom is Gambit and "a world of wonders that defies explanation". The duo find a refuge called Greenhaven led by a powerful mutant, Jason Wyngarde.

== Voice cast ==
=== The Long Night cast ===
- Richard Armitage as Logan / Wolverine
- Celia Keenan-Bolger as Agent Sally Pierce
- Ato Essandoh as Agent Tad Marshall
- Andrew Keenan-Bolger as Deputy Bobby Reid
- Scott Adsit as Sheriff Ridge
- Brian Stokes Mitchell as Nicholas Prophet
- Bob Balaban as Joseph Langrock
- Dante Pereira-Olson as Johnny Moses

=== The Lost Trail cast ===
- Richard Armitage as Logan / Wolverine
- Bill Irwin as Jason Wyngarde / Mastermind
- Bill Heck as Remy LeBeau / Gambit
- Rodney Henry as Marcus Baptiste
- Christina Bennett Lind as Agent Sally Pierce
- Blair Brown as Bonnie Roach
- Mugga as Ruby Baptiste
- Rachael Holmes as Maureen

== Episodes ==
=== Season 1: The Long Night ===
No.	Title	Directed by	Written by	Original air date
1	"Chapter 1: A Thousand Ways to Die in Alaska"	Brendan Baker	Benjamin Percy	September 12, 2018
2	"Chapter 2: Goodnight Nobody"	Brendan Baker	Benjamin Percy	September 12, 2018
3	"Chapter 3: Underground"	Brendan Baker	Benjamin Percy	September 19, 2018
4	"Chapter 4: Hunters"	Brendan Baker	Benjamin Percy	September 26, 2018
5	"Chapter 5: Into the Woods"	Brendan Baker	Benjamin Percy	October 3, 2018
6	"Chapter 6: Archaeology of the Night"	Brendan Baker	Benjamin Percy	October 10, 2018
7	"Chapter 7: You're Next"	Brendan Baker	Benjamin Percy	October 17, 2018
8	"Chapter 8: The Red Sunset"	Brendan Baker	Benjamin Percy	October 24, 2018
9	"Chapter 9: The Changing"	Brendan Baker	Benjamin Percy	October 31, 2018
10	"Chapter 10: No Escape"	Brendan Baker	Benjamin Percy	November 7, 2018

=== Season 2: The Lost Trail ===
No.	Title	Directed by	Written by	Original air date
1	"Chapter 1: Among the Missing"	Brendan Baker	Benjamin Percy	March 25, 2019
2	"Chapter 2: The Forgotten"	Brendan Baker	Benjamin Percy	July 7, 2019
3	"Chapter 3: The Cold Blooded"	Brendan Baker	Benjamin Percy	July 14, 2019
4	"Chapter 4: Into the Swamp"	Brendan Baker	Benjamin Percy	July 21, 2019
5	"Chapter 5: Riverboat Revival"	Brendan Baker	Benjamin Percy	July 28, 2019
6	"Chapter 6: Blood on the Bayou"	Brendan Baker	Benjamin Percy	August 4, 2019
7	"Chapter 7: Welcome to Greenhaven"	Brendan Baker	Benjamin Percy	August 11, 2019
8	"Chapter 8: The Proposition"	Brendan Baker	Benjamin Percy	August 18, 2019
9	"Chapter 9: Greenhaven is Everywhere"	Brendan Baker	Benjamin Percy	August 25, 2019
10	"Chapter 10: Deal With the Devil"	Brendan Baker	Benjamin Percy	September 1, 2019

== Production ==
Marvel New Media and Stitcher announced on December 5, 2017 Wolverine: The Long Night was in production for a spring 2018 launch on Stitcher Premium and a wider release in fall 2018. Sound design for the podcast was by Brendan Baker and Chloe Prasinos with some of the recording taking place outside in the appropriate terrain and with actors interacting and moving together. Producers are Chloe Wilson and Daniel Fink for Marvel and Jenny Radelet for Stitcher. The first season's first two episodes debuted on March 12, 2018, on Stitcher with two episode per week to follow; it ended its first season with ten episodes in early May. A teaser trailer for the podcast was also released to promote it.

On November 5, 2018, Marvel and Sticher announced that second season called Wolverine: The Lost Trail has started production with Gambit and Mastermind being added to the story for a first quarter 2019 debut. With the release of its trailer, Marvel indicated that the release date for the second season to be March 25, 2019 with Percy and Baker returning as writer for the season with associate director and sound designer Chloe Prasinos.

== Reception ==
After listening to three episodes, Beth Elderkin of Io9 found the podcast to be "... off on a promising (albeit imperfect) note." "It might not be perfect, and some of the characters and setups might verge on the ridiculous, but it's exciting to experience a comic book universe story in this format." In 2018, Apple named it as one of the "Best Podcasts of the Year" while being in their Top 25 Most Downloaded Podcasts of the Year and Top 25 Most Downloaded New Podcasts of the Year. During the 2019 iHeartRadio Podcast Awards, it won the Best Scripted Podcast.

The Long Night won Best Scripted Podcast at the inaugural iHeartRadio Podcast Awards in January 2019, as well as a 2019 Webby Award for Best Original Music/Sound Design in a Podcast. In addition, Apple included The Long Night on its Best of 2018 podcasts list.

== Adaptations ==
Due to the success of The Long Night, a comic adaptation was written by the podcast writer Benjamin Percy. Joining Percy on the adaptation was artist Marcio Takara and cover artist Rafael Albuquerque for issue 1 released in January 2019. The adaptation was a five issue mini-series in which two chapters were truncated to fill an issue.

A Spanish-language version of The Long Night podcast — La Larga Noche — was released in September 2021 as part of Marvel's podcasting partnership with SiriusXM. A Spanish-language translation of the comic book adaption was previously released by Panini Cómics Latinoamérica in Argentina in 2019. The Wolverine: La Larga Noche podcast is directed by Alejandra López with sound design by Brendan Baker and Chloe Prasinos and features the voices of Joaquín Cosío as Wolverine, Brigitte Kali Canales as Agent Sally Pierce, Guillermo García as Agent Tad Marshall, Bruno Bichir as Sheriff Ridge, and Ricardo Chávez as Nicholas Prophet. Although Percy's original The Long Night script was used as the basis for La Larga Noche, about half of the dialogue was reinterpreded to better fit the Spanish language. Although the voice actors speak a range of Spanish dialects, the series was voiced primarily in Mexican Spanish.

=== Wolverine: La Larga Noche ===
No.	Title	Directed by	Written by	Original air date
1	"Capítulo Uno: Mil Maneras de Morir en Alaska"	Alejandra López	Benjamin Percy	September 21, 2021
2	"Capítulo Dos: Goodnight Nobody"	Alejandra López	Benjamin Percy	September 21, 2021
3	"Capítulo Tres: Bajo Tierra"	Alejandra López	Benjamin Percy	September 27, 2021
4	"Capítulo Cuatro: Cazadores"	Alejandra López	Benjamin Percy	October 4, 2021
5	"Capítulo Cinco: Hacia el Bosque"	Alejandra López	Benjamin Percy	October 11, 2021
6	"Capítulo Seis: Arqueología de la Noche"	Alejandra López	Benjamin Percy	October 18, 2021
7	"Capítulo Siete: Tu Sigues"	Alejandra López	Benjamin Percy	October 25, 2021
8	"Capítulo Ocho: El Atardecer Rojo"	Alejandra López	Benjamin Percy	November 1, 2021
9	"Capítulo Nueve: El Cambio"	Alejandra López	Benjamin Percy	November 8, 2021
10	"Capítulo Diez: Sin Escape"	Alejandra López	Benjamin Percy	November 15, 2021

== Future ==
Benjamin Percy teased in a 2017 interview with Mashable that Wolverine: The Long Night could be the start of a whole new interconnected universe, which he called the Marvel Podcast Universe.

On August 14, 2019, Marvel and Stitcher announced that a 10-episode podcast adaptation of Kurt Busiek's Marvels would premiere in Fall 2019 with the first season focusing on the aftermath of the Fantastic Four's battle with Galactus and Phil Sheldon and his crew exploring the world of superheroes.
