= The Ticket (2016 film) =

- Film poster
- Directed by: Ido Fluk
- Screenplay by: Ido Fluk; Sharon Mashihi
- Produced by: Claude Dal Farra; Lawrence Inglee; Matthew J. Malek; Oren Moverman; William L. Walton
- Starring: Malin Åkerman; Dan Stevens; Kerry Bishé; Oliver Platt; Liza J. Bennett; Skylar Gaertner
- Cinematography: Zack Galler
- Edited by: Phillip Kimsey
- Music by: Danny Bensi; Saunder Jurriaans
- Production companies: BCDF Pictures; Blackbird; Cave Pictures; Initiate Productions; Liberty Liquid Films; Lightstream Entertainment; Rush River Entertainment
- Distributed by: Shout! Factory
- Release dates: April 16, 2016 (Tribeca Film Festival); April 7, 2017 (United States)
- Running time: 98 minutes
- Country: United States
- Language: English
- Budget: $1.2 million

The Ticket is a 2016 American drama film directed by Ido Fluk and written by Ido Fluk and Sharon Mashihi. The film stars Malin Åkerman, Dan Stevens, Kerry Bishé, Oliver Platt, Liza J. Bennett, and Skylar Gaertner.

The film had its world premiere at the Tribeca Film Festival on April 16, 2016, and was released on April 7, 2017, by Shout! Factory.

== Plot ==
James, who has been blind from youth, lives a contented life with his wife Sam and son Jonah. One day he regains his vision and discovers that an inoperable pituitary tumor that had been pressing on his optic nerves since he was a teenager has miraculously shrunk. Giddy with happiness, James and Sam make plans for their future. However, James finds himself becoming metaphorically blinded by his obsession for the superficial in his pursuit of success.

== Cast ==
- Malin Åkerman as Sam
- Dan Stevens as James
- Kerry Bishé as Jessica
- Oliver Platt as Bob
- Liza J. Bennett as Grace
- Skylar Gaertner as Jonah
- Peter Mark Kendall as Arnold Dixon
- Ekaterina Samsonov as Carla

== Production ==
In August 2014, Malin Åkerman and Dan Stevens joined the cast of the film, with Ido Fluk directing the film from a screenplay by him and Sharon Mashihi, Oren Moverman and Lawrence Inglee serving as producers, while Dale Brown, Nick Byasse, and Katie Heidy will serve as executive producers under their Cave Films, Initiate, and Liberty Liquid Films banners, respectively. That same month, Oliver Platt and Kerry Bishé joined the cast of the film.

== Release ==
The film premiered at the Tribeca Film Festival on April 16, 2016. Shortly after, Shout! Factory acquired U.S distribution rights to the film. The film was released in a limited release and through video on demand on April 7, 2017.

== Reception ==
The film received a mixed reception, with critics praising the acting and certain cinematic elements but lamenting the slow pace and predictability of the plot. Jon Frosch of The Hollywood Reporter noted that "Fluk's compositions are at once chilly and sensual, with a European art cinema buff's attention to bodies, and there are lovely moments throughout" and praised Stevens' portrayal of the lead character but commented that "once you see where the movie's going it's a bit of a slog". Nigel M. Smith of The Guardian gave the film three stars out of five: "Admirably cynical until it loses its way in the final stretch, The Ticket nevertheless maintains a provocative allure, bolstered by a fiercely committed performance from Dan Stevens."
