= Rampart (film) =

2011 drama film directed by Oren Moverman

- Theatrical release poster
- Directed by: Oren Moverman
- Written by: James Ellroy; Oren Moverman
- Produced by: Ben Foster; Lawrence Inglee; Ken Kao; Clark Peterson
- Starring: Woody Harrelson; Ned Beatty; Ben Foster; Anne Heche; Ice Cube; Cynthia Nixon; Sigourney Weaver; Robert Wisdom; Robin Wright; Steve Buscemi
- Cinematography: Bobby Bukowski
- Edited by: Jay Rabinowitz
- Music by: Dickon Hinchliffe
- Production companies: Amalgam Features; Waypoint Entertainment
- Distributed by: Millennium Entertainment
- Release dates: September 10, 2011 (TIFF); February 10, 2012 (United States)
- Running time: 108 minutes
- Country: United States
- Language: English
- Box office: $900,000

Rampart is a 2012 American crime drama film. Directed by Oren Moverman and co-written by Moverman and James Ellroy, the film stars Woody Harrelson, Ned Beatty, Ben Foster, Anne Heche, Brie Larson, Ice Cube, Cynthia Nixon, Sigourney Weaver, Robin Wright, and Steve Buscemi. It is set in the midst of the fallout from the Rampart scandal of the late 1990s, when corrupt Los Angeles Police Department Officer Dave Brown (Harrelson) is forced to face the consequences of his wayward career.

The film premiered at the Toronto International Film Festival on September 10, 2011. and was released in theaters in the U.S. on February 10, 2012. The film received positive reviews, but was a box-office bomb.

== Plot ==
Dave Brown, a 24-year veteran of the Los Angeles Police Department (LAPD), patrols the Rampart Division. While training a new officer, he roughs up a suspect to find the location of a meth lab. After work, he goes home to his two daughters and two ex-wives, who are also sisters. After dinner, he goes to a piano bar where he picks up a stranger and has a one night stand.

The next day, Brown is t-boned in his patrol car. When he gets out and approaches, the other driver hits him with the car door and attempts to flee, Brown brutally beats him and the assault is captured on video by a bystander. The video creates another controversy for the LAPD, which is already besieged by the recent Rampart scandal. The assistant district attorney pressures Brown to retire, but he refuses and outlines his defense. Over the course of the film, it is revealed that although Brown failed the bar exam, he remains extremely knowledgeable about case law.

Back at the piano bar, Brown picks up a lawyer named Linda after first determining that she is not surveilling him. Later he meets with ex-cop Hartshorn, who suggests that Brown was set up to distract from the Rampart scandal. As the LAPD exerts more pressure on Brown, he retains legal counsel. Soon after, his ex-wives ask him to leave their houses so that they can sell them. Brown meets Hartshorn again and mentions his need for cash. Hartshorn tips him off to a high stake card game happening later that night at the Crystal Market.

While Brown surveils the card game, it is knocked off by two armed men. Brown pursues the gunmen, killing one and letting the other go. He then stages the scene to make it look like he was shot at. Brown realizes that a homeless man nicknamed "General" witnessed the whole thing from his wheelchair. As another investigation into Brown heats up, he goes to a hotel and blackmails the concierge into giving him a room. Next, he blackmails a pharmacist into giving him an assortment of drugs.

When Brown next meets Hartshorn to give him a cut of the money from the card game, he asks for the source of Hartshorn's tip, suspecting he was set up again. Hartshorn refuses to name his source. Brown then meets with General in a parking lot to make sure that he will not testify about witnessing the shooting. The next day, an investigator with the district attorney, Kyle Timkins, surveils Brown, who confronts him. Brown insists that he is not a racist, merely a misanthrope.

Brown grows increasingly paranoid and reliant on drugs as the pressure on him mounts. He pulls a gun on Hartshorn and accuses him of setting him up. The elderly man scuffles with Brown until he has a heart attack. Instead of calling an ambulance, Brown leaves him to die. Back at the hotel, Brown's two daughters drop off some dry cleaning at his room, and he confesses to his younger daughter that everything she has heard about him is true.

Brown summons Timkins to a meeting and tapes a confession in front of him. He admits that he has been a dirty cop, and that in 1987 he killed a business acquaintance. He justified the murder because he knew the man was a serial rapist, which is why he got away with the extrajudicial killing. Timkins refuses the confession, insisting that he will arrest Brown for his most recent murder. The film ends with Brown revisiting his family and staring at his elder daughter on the front porch before disappearing into the night.

== Cast ==
- Woody Harrelson as David Douglas "Dave" Brown
- Ned Beatty as Hartshorn
- Ben Foster as "General" Terry
- Anne Heche as Catherine
- Ice Cube as Kyle Timkins
- Cynthia Nixon as Barbara
- Sigourney Weaver as Joan Confrey
- Robin Wright as Linda Fentress
- Steve Buscemi as Bill Blago
- Brie Larson as Helen
- Don Creech as Head Shark Lawyer
- Jon Bernthal as Dan Morone
- Jon Foster as Michael Whitaker
- Robert Wisdom as Captain
- Audra McDonald as Sarah

== Production ==
In an interview with The Playlist, Harrelson said he lost 30 pounds to prepare for the role of Dave Brown, stating "a part of it was that I felt like he would have this relationship to food which is very similar to his relationship with women." Harrelson also accompanied two LAPD officers as part of his research. Harrelson's take on the character was the following: "He can't really accept love, and if the food were representative of love. It's his inability to take that affection and nourishment." He added, "I would say if one emotion that is most at play with Dave Brown it would be paranoia. So that emotion was kind of with me quite a bit during the filming."

Harrelson commented, "I had a period where I saw an early cut of the movie and didn't go for it, mainly because it was so different from the script and what we shot."

=== Filming ===
Rampart was filmed over 35 days in the Los Angeles area, including communities actually served by the Rampart precinct. To draw emotional performances out of his actors, director Oren Moverman eschewed rehearsals, did fewer than five takes for most scenes, and encouraged improvisation.

== Release ==
Rampart premiered at the Toronto Film Festival on September 10, 2011. It was subsequently acquired by Millennium Entertainment, who released the film for one week in late November in New York City and LA in order to qualify for Academy Awards consideration. It was later given a limited theatrical release on February 10, 2012.

== Marketing ==
Marketing poster

The marketing team behind Rampart posted controversial posters in several major U.S. cities before the film was released. They showed Harrelson's character, Officer Dave Brown, beating a man with a baton. The posters stated "I Work For You" and were meant to look like street art posters. Moverman said one of the producers had been "searching for an image that would be thought-provoking and challenging, not an indictment of a cop but rather a communal approach to the idea of policing, the idea that maybe when cops do bad things it's more of a reflection of society and what it is willing to tolerate, rather than the fault of one bad apple or an institutional problem. If they work for us, could it be they are us?"

=== Reddit AMA ===
An attempt to market the film via the social news website Reddit went "horribly wrong", according to Forbes. Harrelson agreed to answer questions in an AMA (Ask Me Anything) session on Reddit's massively popular IAmA subreddit, where notable people engage in Q&A sessions with the Reddit community. Redditors were disappointed by his answers and his apparent misunderstanding of the format, most notably refusing to answer a question regarding Harrelson's alleged sexual encounter with an individual at a prom afterparty, with some vowing to "boycott the flick". CNET characterized one of Harrelson's responses as "sheer oozing, all-about-me-ism".

Josh Feldman of Mediaite shared the following perspective: "a proxy for the actor basically gave vague answers to half of the questions and in-no-way subtle plugs for his upcoming movie Rampart to the other half. It was a public relations nightmare, and while it certainly raised awareness about the movie, it definitely backfired." Feldman went on to say about the incident, "it came across as robotic and represented an inability to connect with people when it should have been insanely easy to do so." Feldman summarized the lesson learned by stating the following: "When you’re doing an AMA on Reddit, you drop the act and engage with real people. Some will be fans, some won’t, but if you’re just honest and it doesn’t seem like your answers have been planned out, people will respect you for it."

== Reception ==
=== Critical response ===
Rampart received generally positive reviews. On Rotten Tomatoes, it has an approval rating of 74% based on 145 reviews, with an average rating of 6.60/10. The site's consensus was that "Rampart sends viewers plummeting into a nihilistic hell of its protagonist's creation, yet Woody Harrelson's performance in the central role is too magnetic to dismiss". On Metacritic, the film has a score of 70 based on 35 reviews, indicating "generally favorable reviews".

Roger Ebert gave the film four out of four stars and praised Harrelson's performance, writing "Harrelson is an ideal actor for the role. Especially in tensely wound-up movies like this, he implies that he's looking at everything and then watching himself looking." Peter Travers of Rolling Stone praised Harrelson's performance: "it could have been a bucket of bleak. But the electric talent of Harrelson and Moverman is too exciting to be anything but exhilarating."

Justin Chang of Variety wrote: "While the film is drenched in atmosphere and packs a verbal and visceral punch, its relentless downward spiral makes for an overdetermined, not entirely satisfying character study." Kirk Honeycutt of The Hollywood Reporter wrote: "Harrelson goes full bore from the opening scene and there are no scenes he is not in. But the effect is wearying rather than exhilarating."

=== Box office ===
Rampart was a box-office bomb, opening at No. 47 and earning only $60,446 on its opening weekend across 5 theatres in North America. It ended up making just $972,512 domestically and $595,393 elsewhere across 106 theaters for a total of $1,567,905. In addition, total domestic video sales were equal to $2,150,130.

=== Awards ===
- Won – African American Film Critics Association Award for Best Actor (Woody Harrelson)
- Nominated – Independent Spirit Award for Best Male Lead (Harrelson)
- Nominated – Satellite Award for Best Actor in a Motion Picture (Harrelson)
