= Skylar Gaertner =

American actor

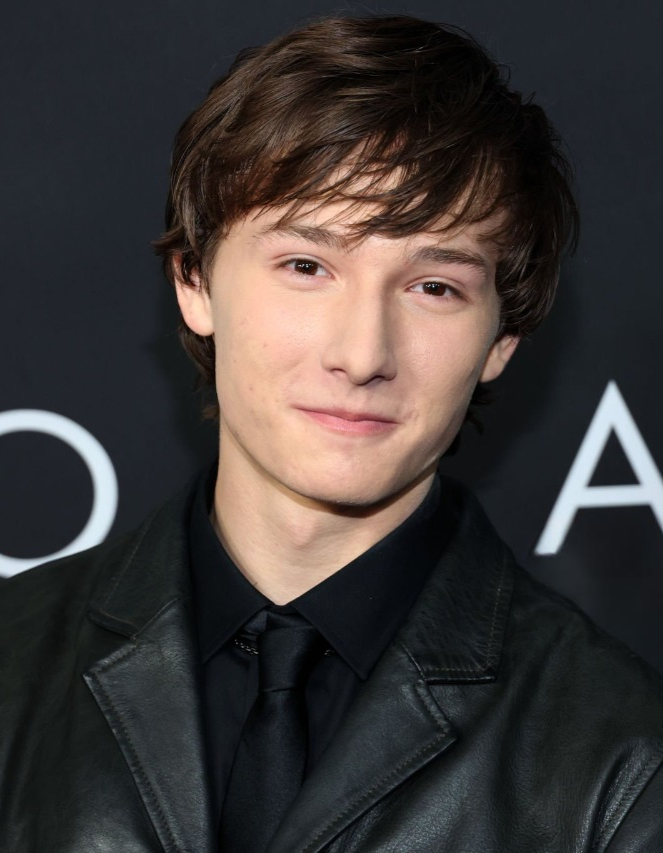
- Gaertner in 2022
- Born: May 13, 2004 (age 21); New York City, U.S.
- Occupation: Actor

Skylar Gaertner (born May 13, 2004) is an American actor, best known for playing Jonah Byrde in the Netflix TV series Ozark from 2017 to 2022, and young Matt Murdock in the 2015 TV series Daredevil. In 2011, aged seven, Gaertner was handpicked by Steven Spielberg to play Bode Locke in the TV pilot horror-thriller Locke & Key.

== Work ==
Gaertner started acting in TV commercials aged three. He landed the role of Jonah Byrde in Ozark aged 12.

=== TV ===
Year	Title	Role	Notes
2008–2009	Lipstick Jungle	Sam	
2009–2015	Nurse Jackie	Jake	
2011	Locke & Key (TV pilot)	Bode Locke	
2011	CSI: Crime Scene Investigation	Emmett Drake	
2012	Person of Interest	Danny Cahill	
2013–2018	The Americans	Doug Tanner	
2015–2018	Daredevil	Young Matt Murdock	
2017–2022	Ozark	Jonah Byrde	
2023	Accused	Wyatt	

=== Film ===
Year	Title	Role
2014	Alex of Venice	Dakota
2014	They Came Together	Tucker
2014	Every Secret Thing	Jimmy (uncredited)
2015	Sleeping with Other People	Oliver
2015	I Smile Back	Eli
2016	The Ticket	Jonah

== Nominations ==
For his role in Ozark, Gaertner was part of the ensemble nominated for a Screen Actors Guild Award for Outstanding Performance by an Ensemble in a Drama Series in 2019, 2021, and 2023.
