= Menno Meyjes =

Dutch screenwriter, producer, director

- Born: 1954 (age 71–72); Bloemendaal, North Holland, Netherlands
- Education: San Francisco Art Institute (1980, MFA)
- Occupations: Screenwriter, director, producer
- Website: mennomeyjes.com

Menno Meyjes (born 1954) is a Dutch screenwriter, film director, and producer. He is an Academy Award and a BAFTA Award nominee, and a Goya Award and Hugo Award winner.

== Biography ==
Meyjes was born in Bloemendaal, North Holland in 1954. He moved to the United States in 1972 and studied at San Francisco Art Institute, graduating with a master's degree in 1980. In 1984, he founded the graphic design magazine Emigre, with fellow Dutchmen Marc Susan and Rudy VanderLans.

Meyjes first gained attention for his spec script The Children's Crusade, which was later produced in 1987 by Francis Ford Coppola as Lionheart. His first produced screenplay was the 1985 film The Color Purple, directed by Steven Spielberg and based on Alice Walker's 1982 novel of the same name. He was nominated for an Academy Award and a BAFTA Award for Best Adapted Screenplay.

Meyjes worked with Steven Spielberg again, when he was a script doctor for Empire of the Sun (1987), and then co-wrote the story for Indiana Jones and the Last Crusade in 1989. The same year, he won a Goya Award for writing the Spanish film Twisted Obsession.

In 2002, Meyjes wrote and directed the film Max.

In 2012, Meyjes adapted the Dutch novel The Dinner into a film.

== Filmography ==
Year	Title	Director	Writer	Notes
1985	Amazing Stories	No	Yes	Television series (Episode: "The Mission")
1985	The Color Purple	No	Yes	
1987	Lionheart	No	Yes	
1989	Indiana Jones and the Last Crusade	No	Story	
1991	Ricochet	No	Story	
1994	Foreign Student	No	Yes	Also co-producer
1998	The Siege	No	Yes	
2002	Max	Yes	Yes	Directorial Debut
2007	Martian Child	Yes	No	
2008	Manolete	Yes	Yes	
2011	Black Gold	No	Yes	
2013	The Dinner	Yes	Yes	
2015	De Reünie	Yes	Yes	
2016	De Held	Yes	Yes	
TBA	Close Enough	No	Yes	

Uncredited written works:

- Empire of the Sun (1987)
- El Sueño del mono loco (1989)
