= Max Rose (film) =

2013 film by Daniel Noah

- Poster
- Directed by: Daniel Noah
- Written by: Daniel Noah
- Produced by: Lawrence Inglee; Garrett Kelleher; Bill Walton
- Starring: Jerry Lewis; Kerry Bishé; Illeana Douglas; Rance Howard; Kevin Pollak; Mort Sahl; Dean Stockwell; Lee Weaver; Fred Willard; Claire Bloom
- Cinematography: Christopher Blauvelt
- Edited by: Richard Halsey; Colleen Halsey
- Music by: Morgan Z. Whirledge
- Production companies: Lightstream Entertainment; Rush River Entertainment
- Distributed by: Paladin Films
- Release dates: May 23, 2013 (Cannes Film Festival); September 2, 2016
- Country: United States
- Language: English
- Box office: $66,680

Max Rose is a 2013 American drama film written and directed by Daniel Noah, and distributed by Paladin Films. The film stars Jerry Lewis, Kevin Pollak, Kerry Bishé, Claire Bloom and Dean Stockwell. Its story follows a jazz pianist who suspects that his wife of 65 years may have been unfaithful.

The film was among the last released for Jerry Lewis, Dean Stockwell and Mort Sahl, before their passings in 2017 and 2021 respectively, although Lewis and Stockwell filmed scenes for other films later that were released before Max Rose, including The Trust, Persecuted, and Entertainment.

The film was produced by Lightstream Entertainment and Rush River Entertainment. The film premiered at the 2013 Cannes Film Festival. It was released theatrically on September 2, 2016.

== Plot ==
Max Rose is an aging jazz pianist who learns that his wife of 65 years may have been unfaithful to him. Though his career was not everything he had hoped it would be, Max Rose always felt like a success because his beautiful, elegant wife, Eva, was by his side. While going through her things, however, Max discovers an object bearing an intimate inscription from another man, a shocking revelation that leads him to believe his entire marriage, indeed, his entire life, was built on a lie. Coping with anger, withdrawal and his own fragile health, Rose embarks on an exploration of his past, all the while searching for Eva's mystery suitor, hoping to find the answers he needs to be at peace.

== Cast ==
- Jerry Lewis as Max Rose
- Kerry Bishé as Annie Rose
- Illeana Douglas as Jenny Flowers
- Rance Howard as Walter Prewitt
- Kevin Pollak as Christopher Rose
- Mort Sahl as Jack Murphy
- Dean Stockwell as Ben Tracey
- Lee Weaver as Lee Miller
- Fred Willard as Jim Clark
- Claire Bloom as Eva Rose

== Production ==
It was Lewis's first starring film role since 1995's Funny Bones, as well as his final starring role. Oscar winners Michel Legrand with Alan and Marilyn Bergman created an original song for the feature. The film was produced by Lightstream Entertainment's Garrett Kelleher and Blackbird's Lawrence Inglee, along with Rush River's Bill Walton.

== Release ==
The film was shown Out of Competition at the 2013 Cannes Film Festival in 2013. Max Rose received a limited theatrical release through Paladin in September 2016, with nationwide expansion in October 2016.

== Reception ==
=== Box office ===
It grossed $4,000 in its opening weekend, and $66,680 worldwide.

=== Critical response ===
The film has a 37% rating on Rotten Tomatoes, based on 43 critic reviews, stating that "Max Rose marks Jerry Lewis' long-overdue return to the screen – and is unfortunately less than memorable in almost every other respect." In a negative review, Tim Grierson of Paste wrote the film "has an icky earnestness and general incompetence that make this potential comeback vehicle a rather exasperating viewing experience."
