= Norman (2016 film) =

Norman: The Moderate Rise and Tragic Fall of a New York Fixer
- Theatrical release poster
- Directed by: Joseph Cedar
- Written by: Joseph Cedar
- Produced by: Miranda Bailey; Lawrence Inglee; David Mandil; Oren Moverman; Eyal Rimmon; Gideon Tadmor
- Starring: Richard Gere; Lior Ashkenazi; Hank Azaria; Steve Buscemi; Charlotte Gainsbourg; Michael Sheen; Dan Stevens
- Cinematography: Yaron Scharf
- Edited by: Brian A. Kates
- Music by: Jun Miyake
- Production companies: Tadmor; Cold Iron Pictures; The Rabinovich Foundation; The Jerusalem Film Fund; Keshet International
- Distributed by: Sony Pictures Classics
- Release dates: 3 September 2016 (Telluride); 8 March 2017 (Israel); 14 April 2017 (United States)
- Running time: 118 minutes
- Countries: United States; Israel
- Language: English / Hebrew
- Box office: $5.2 million

Norman: The Moderate Rise and Tragic Fall of a New York Fixer (Hebrew: נורמן: עלייתו המתונה ונפילתו התלולה של מאכער אמריקאי) is a 2016 political drama film directed and written by Joseph Cedar. The film stars Richard Gere and Lior Ashkenazi. Filming began on February 8, 2015, in New York City. The film played at the 2016 Telluride Film Festival and the 2016 Toronto International Film Festival.

The film follows the career of a fictional fixer in New York City, who associates himself with politicians and power brokers. His life changes when he gains influence on the new Prime Minister of Israel. The Prime Minister is soon involved in a bribery scandal, and the fixer finds himself suspected by the authorities.

== Plot ==
Norman Oppenheimer is a small-time "fixer" in New York City who makes money by doing favors for and arranging access to politicos and other power brokers. He befriends Micha Eshel, an Israeli politician, buying him an expensive pair of shoes and using him to wrangle an invitation to the home of Arthur Taub, an important businessman. Taub quickly recognizes Norman as an opportunist and tells him to leave. On a train, Norman meets Alex Green, an Israeli criminal investigator, telling her all about his business and his relationship to Eshel, even diagramming his connections on a piece of paper. She pays close attention and keeps the paper.

Three years later, Eshel becomes Prime Minister of Israel and visits the United States to meet with the President, speak to the United Nations, and sign a peace treaty with Israel's neighbors. He greets Norman effusively at a large reception covered by the media and introduces him to a panoply of powerful people. Norman's life changes rapidly as he is approached by those who want to take advantage of his influence.

Norman is asked by his synagogue and its leader, Rabbi Blumenthal, to help them raise millions of dollars to save their building, so Norman arranges a quid pro quo with a powerful businessman, Jo Wilf, who wants to make a deal with Israel. Norman uses his nephew Philip, a lawyer who has an inside connection at Harvard University, to get Eshel's son accepted to the school—in exchange for persuading Blumenthal to conduct the marriage of Philip and his fiancée, a Korean woman who is not a Jew. However, Eshel and his wife have second thoughts about accepting favors from Norman as Eshel is caught up in an Israeli bribery scandal being investigated by Green.

Norman arranges to meet with Green at the Israeli consulate, but Philip implores him not to do so as he believes Eshel's political career is doomed and as he suspects Norman is also under investigation. Norman calls Eshel's aides and offers to give them any information he can get from Green, but they forbid the meeting, telling Norman that it is a severe crime, that he must stop using Eshel's name, and that Eshel is not Norman's friend. But they call him back, assuming he won't be able to keep his mouth shut, and tell him that whoever is supposed to have compromised Eshel is a criminal who is making up stories and who doesn't even know the Prime Minister. Norman immediately conveys these claims to a man, Srul Katz, who is following him and who turns out to be another would-be fixer.

At the consulate, Green tells Norman that he is the bribery suspect, but that if he will testify against Eshel, Norman will not face prosecution. He leaves and goes to the synagogue, where the furious rabbi, having realized that Norman made false promises, throws him into a pile of garbage. As Norman sits amid the garbage, Eshel calls him and tells him he is sorry he will have to denounce him in order to maintain his position and sign the peace treaty. Norman vows never to betray him.

Norman arranges a meeting with Jo Wilf. What he reveals allows Wilf to make billions on an Israel-Turkey natural gas pipeline. All of the fixes Norman has set in motion are successful: Philip gets married, Eshel's son gets into Harvard, the synagogue gets the money it needs, the peace treaty is signed, and Eshel is not impeached. Norman is never deposed in the bribery investigation as he buys a bag of peanuts, to which he has a deadly allergy, throws away his EpiPen, and prepares to eat the nuts.

== Cast ==
- Richard Gere as Norman Oppenheimer
- Lior Ashkenazi as Micha Eshel
- Michael Sheen as Philip Cohen
- Steve Buscemi as Rabbi Blumenthal
- Josh Charles as Arthur Taub
- Charlotte Gainsbourg as Alex Green
- Ann Dowd as Carol Raskin
- Dan Stevens as Bill Kavish
- Harris Yulin as Jo Wilf
- Hank Azaria as Srul Katz
- Dov Glickman as Ron Maor
- Isaach de Bankolé as The Shoe Salesman

== Production ==
On November 14, 2014, Richard Gere was set to star in the political thriller Oppenheimer Strategies, written by Joseph Cedar who would also direct the film. On January 14, 2015, Charlotte Gainsbourg was added to the cast to play the female lead. On February 6, Michael Sheen, Steve Buscemi and Josh Charles were added to the cast to star along with Dan Stevens, Isaach de Bankolé and Lior Ashkenazi.

Filming was originally set to begin on January 12, 2015, in New York City, but it began on February 8, 2015. On February 12, filming took place around 93rd Street and Amsterdam Ave in Manhattan.

== Release ==
The film played at the Telluride Film Festival in September 2016, and then had its international premiere at the Toronto International Film Festival. Prior to, Sony Pictures Classics acquired distribution rights in North America, Benelux, Scandinavia, Eastern Europe, and Asia (excluding Korea) to the film and it was then the previous title changed from Oppenheimer Strategies to Norman.

The US theatrical release was on April 14, 2017.

== Reception ==
At Metacritic, which assigns a weighted average score out of 100 to reviews from mainstream critics, the film received an average score of 75 based on 33 reviews. Richard Gere was praised by The Guardian for his "strong performance" and by Variety for portraying a "Court Jew". Indeed, Cedar's fictional character 'Norman Oppenheimer' was inspired in part by the real life court Jew Joseph Süß Oppenheimer, whose life in turn inspired the 1934 British film Jew Süss, as well as the 1940 Nazi propaganda film Jud Süß.
