= The Messenger (2009 film) =

2009 film directed by Oren Moverman

- Theatrical release poster
- Directed by: Oren Moverman
- Written by: Alessandro Camon; Oren Moverman
- Produced by: Mark Gordon; Lawrence Inglee; Zach Miller
- Starring: Ben Foster; Woody Harrelson; Samantha Morton; Jena Malone
- Cinematography: Bobby Bukowski
- Edited by: Alexander Hall
- Music by: Nathan Larson
- Distributed by: Oscilloscope Laboratories
- Release dates: January 19, 2009 (Sundance); November 13, 2009 (United States)
- Running time: 113 minutes
- Country: United States
- Language: English
- Budget: $6.5-10 million
- Box office: $1.5 million

The Messenger is a 2009 American independent war film starring Ben Foster, Woody Harrelson, Samantha Morton, Steve Buscemi, and Jena Malone. It is the directorial debut of Oren Moverman, who also wrote the screenplay with Alessandro Camon. The film follows a pair of United States Army casualty notification officers and the effects of their difficult work on their personal lives and each other.

The film premiered at the 2009 Sundance Film Festival and was in competition at the 59th Berlin International Film Festival where it won the Silver Bear for Best Screenplay and the Berlinale Peace Film Award '09. The film received first prize for the 2009 Deauville American Film Festival. The film has also received four Independent Spirit Award nominations (including one win), a Golden Globe nomination, and two Oscar nominations.

== Plot ==
U.S. Army Staff Sergeant Will Montgomery is on leave from the Iraq War. He has received commendation for his heroic actions during the war, but is dealing with PTSD and has a chronic condition in his left eye as a result of being wounded in combat. His only emotional connection is his childhood sweetheart Kelly, whom he was originally intent on marrying before he left for Iraq, but she could not wait for him and has since become engaged to another man.

Before Will is to be discharged, he is dispatched as a casualty notification officer along with Captain Tony Stone as his mentor. Stone, a Gulf War veteran who saw no combat, is the more soldierly of the two and relays to Will the protocol for notifying next of kin of a tragedy, which includes no speaking to anyone who is not the next of kin, using informal language, hugging, physical contact, or fraternizing with the grief-stricken. On the job, their first report is to a family that results in the deceased's mother and pregnant fiancée breaking down, with the mother slapping Stone. The next visits are to a man named Dale Martin who angrily throws items and spits at Will; a woman who secretly married an enlisted man; and a Mexican man who is told through an interpreter about the death of his daughter. One woman named Olivia is in considerably less visible pain after learning of her husband's death, which Stone suspects is due to her having an affair.

In a bar, Will and Stone open up about their lives to each other. Will talks about Kelly rejecting him and tells Stone about his father's death due to drunk driving, along with tales of his estranged mother. At the mall, Will sees Olivia with her son buying clothes for her husband's funeral. He breaks up an argument between her and two Army recruiters attempting to enlist young people, before offering her a ride home. He fixes her car and becomes friendly with both her and her young son Matt. After hearing a voicemail from Kelly talking about her upcoming wedding, he punches a hole through his wall in a fit of rage. He arrives at Olivia's house and the two express affection for each other, but his attempts at physical intimacy are met with hesitancy as she tells him about how her husband mistreated her and her son.

When Will comforts a family in a local store using physical contact after telling them of their son's fate, Stone berates him for breaking the "no physical contact with the next of kin" rule. Will stands up to his rank by using his first name "Tony" before walking home by himself. They later reconcile and spend the next few days together at a lakeside cabin where Stone brings along two women; Stone has sex with one of them and unsuccessfully tries to get Will to do the same. They end up at Kelly's wedding reception intoxicated and create a disturbance during the toasts. Later, they play-fight in a parking lot and wake up after having passed out. The pair return to Will's apartment, where Dale is standing outside. He apologizes to Will and Tony for physically targeting them during their notification. In his apartment, Will tells Tony about his experience with a friend who died while fighting in Iraq—an event that resulted in his injury to his left eye—and how he feels his bravery was meaningless as he could not do anything for him; he contemplated suicide soon after, but stopped himself when he saw the sunrise. Hearing this, Tony breaks down in tears.

The next day, Will meets Olivia as she's loading her belongings into a truck. She informs Will that she is moving with her son to Louisiana, and Will tells her he is considering staying in the U.S. Army. He asks Olivia to let him know their new address; she obliges and asks him to come with her into the house so he can write down his address in return.

== Cast ==
- Ben Foster as Staff Sergeant Will Montgomery
- Woody Harrelson as Captain Tony Stone
- Samantha Morton as Olivia Pitterson
- Jena Malone as Kelly
- Steve Buscemi as Dale Martin
- Yaya DaCosta as Monica Washington
- Eamonn Walker as Lieutenant Colonel Stuart Dorsett
- Peter Francis James as Dr. Grosso
- Merritt Wever as Lara
- Gaius Charles as Recruiter Brown
- Brendan Sexton III as Recruiter Olson
- Carl Anthony Payne II as Pitterson's Father
- Halley Feiffer as Marla Galindo née Cohen
- Peter Friedman as Mr. Cohen
- Jeremy Strong as Returning Soldier
- Fiona Dourif as Returning Soldier's Wife
- Michael Chernus as Alan

== Production ==
The Messenger marked the directorial debut of Israeli-American screenwriter and former journalist Oren Moverman. Moverman first began work on the film's script with screenwriter Alessandro Camon in 2006. Moverman said he wanted to write a film about the "unseen aspects of war", especially as President George W. Bush had upheld a ban on photos of soldiers' coffins in the media during his administration. Said Moverman, "We talked about how, despite the extensive coverage of the war as a political issue, there was a blind spot related to the human cost of it."

Directors that expressed interest in helming the project included Sydney Pollack, Roger Michell, and Ben Affleck. After talks with these directors fell through, the film's producers asked Moverman to direct the project himself, despite several Iraq War-related films having recently bombed at the box office. The filmmakers worked closely with the United States Army and the Walter Reed Medical Center to conduct research on military life, and were specifically advised by Lieutenant Colonel Paul Sinor, who had himself worked as a casualty notification officer.

The film was shot over 28 days in 2008 in the Fort Dix area in New Jersey.

The scene of Will and Olivia in the kitchen was filmed in a single take. Moverman said, "Something was in the air that day, and I told the cinematographer to put the camera outside the kitchen...I didn't even tell the performers we were shooting. It was a rehearsal. And I gave them only one set of instructions: 'Go in there but don't kiss. Do everything you can to avoid the kiss.'"

== Release ==
The Messenger premiered at the 2009 Sundance Film Festival on January 19, before receiving a limited release in North America in 4 theaters. It grossed $44,523 for an average of $11,131 per theater ranking 46th at the box office, and went on to earn $1.1 million domestically and $411,601 internationally for a total of $1.5 million, against its budget of $6.5 million.

== Reception ==
=== Critical response ===
On Rotten Tomatoes, the film has an approval rating of 90%, based on 162 reviews, with an average rating of 7.51/10. The site's critical consensus states, "A dark but timely subject is handled deftly by writer/director Oren Moverman and superbly acted by Woody Harrelson and Ben Foster." On Metacritic, the film has a score of 77 out of 100, based on 32 critics, indicating "generally favorable reviews".

Claudia Puig of USA Today wrote the film "a gentle portrait of grief, friendship and solace". Roger Ebert awarded the film 3 and ½ stars out of 4, writing:

'The Messenger' knows that even if it tells a tearjerking story, it doesn't have to be a tearjerker. In fact, when a sad story tries too hard, it can be fatal. You have to be the one coming to your own realization about the sadness. Moverman and his screenwriter, Alessandro Camon, born in Italy, have made a very particularly American story, alert to nuances of speech and behavior. All particular stories are universal, inviting us to look in instead of pandering to us. This one looks at the faces of war. Only a few, but they represent so many.

The performances of the cast were subject to considerable praise, with Harrelson earning Golden Globe and Oscar nominations for his work. David Edelstein of New York wrote the film is a breakthrough for Foster, and Ebert said, "Here in countless subtle ways, [Foster] suggests a human being with ordinary feelings who has been through painful experiences and is outwardly calm but not anywhere near healed." The Los Angeles Times' Betsy Sharkey wrote: "At his most fundamental, Will is a soldier in search of normalcy, for a way to move beyond the horrors of Iraq, to fit in again. Foster leaves you hoping that Will finds his way home." Of Morton, Edelstein said, "I'm not sure how [she] made sense of her character's ebbs and flows, but I never doubted her. She’s a mariner in uncharted seas of emotion."

=== Awards and nominations ===
Year	Ceremony	Category	Recipients	Result
2009	14th Satellite Awards	Best Drama Film		Nominated
2009	14th Satellite Awards	Best Supporting Actor	Woody Harrelson	Nominated
2009	15th Critics' Choice Awards	Best Supporting Actor	Woody Harrelson	Nominated
2009	15th Critics' Choice Awards	Best Supporting Actress	Samantha Morton	Nominated
2009	16th Screen Actors Guild Awards	Best Male Actor in a Supporting Role	Woody Harrelson	Nominated
2009	25th Independent Spirit Awards	Best First Feature		Nominated
2009	25th Independent Spirit Awards	Best Supporting Male	Woody Harrelson	Won
2009	25th Independent Spirit Awards	Best Supporting Female	Samantha Morton	Nominated
2009	25th Independent Spirit Awards	Best Screenplay	Alessandro Camon; Oren Moverman	Nominated
2009	36th Saturn Awards	Best Action / Adventure / Thriller Film		Nominated
2009	59th Berlin International Film Festival	Golden Bear - Best Film		Nominated
2009	59th Berlin International Film Festival	Silver Bear - Best Screenplay	Alessandro Camon; Oren Moverman	Won
2009	67th Golden Globe Awards	Best Supporting Actor	Woody Harrelson	Nominated
2009	82nd Academy Awards	Best Supporting Actor	Woody Harrelson	Nominated
2009	82nd Academy Awards	Best Original Screenplay	Alessandro Camon; Oren Moverman	Nominated
2009	2009 National Society of Film Critics Awards	Best Supporting Actress	Samantha Morton	Nominated
2009	Chicago Film Critics Association Awards 2009	Best Supporting Actor	Woody Harrelson	Nominated
2009	Dallas–Fort Worth Film Critics Association Awards 2009	Best Supporting Actor	Woody Harrelson	Nominated
2009	Deauville American Film Festival	Grand Prix		Won
2009	Denver Film Critics Society Awards 2009	Best Supporting Actor	Woody Harrelson	Nominated
2009	Detroit Film Critics Society Awards 2009	Best Supporting Actor	Woody Harrelson	Nominated
2009	Gotham Independent Film Awards 2009	Breakthrough Performer	Ben Foster	Nominated
2009	Houston Film Critics Society Awards 2009	Best Supporting Actor	Woody Harrelson	Nominated
2009	Houston Film Critics Society Awards 2009	Best Supporting Actress	Samantha Morton	Nominated
2009	National Board of Review Awards 2009	Best Supporting Actor	Woody Harrelson	Won
2009	National Board of Review Awards 2009	Best Directorial Debut	Oren Moverman	Won
2009	Online Film Critics Society Awards 2009	Best Supporting Actor	Woody Harrelson	Nominated
2009	San Diego Film Critics Society Awards 2009	Best Actor	Ben Foster	Nominated
2009	San Diego Film Critics Society Awards 2009	Best Supporting Actor	Woody Harrelson	Nominated
2009	San Diego Film Critics Society Awards 2009	Best Supporting Actress	Samantha Morton	Won
2009	San Diego Film Critics Society Awards 2009	Best Original Screenplay	Alessandro Camon; Oren Moverman	Nominated
2009	San Diego Film Critics Society Awards 2009	Best Ensemble Performance		Nominated
2009	Southeastern Film Critics Association Awards 2009	Best Supporting Actor	Woody Harrelson	Runner-up
2009	St. Louis Gateway Film Critics Association Awards 2009	Best Director	Oren Moverman	Nominated
2009	St. Louis Gateway Film Critics Association Awards 2009	Best Actor	Ben Foster	Nominated
2009	St. Louis Gateway Film Critics Association Awards 2009	Best Supporting Actor	Woody Harrelson	Nominated
2009	St. Louis Gateway Film Critics Association Awards 2009	Best Supporting Actress	Samantha Morton	Nominated
2009	Washington D.C. Area Film Critics Association Awards 2009	Best Supporting Actor	Woody Harrelson	Nominated
2009	Washington D.C. Area Film Critics Association Awards 2009	Best Supporting Actress	Samantha Morton	Nominated

=== Top ten lists ===
The Messenger appeared on several critics' top ten lists of the best films of 2009.

- 3rd: Robert Mondello, NPR
- 4th: Ty Burr, Boston Globe
- 4th: Stephen Holden, The New York Times
- 9th: Frank Scheck, The Hollywood Reporter
- 10th: Peter Travers, Rolling Stone
- Top 10: David Denby, The New Yorker
