= The Dinner (novel) =

Book by Herman Koch

- English language cover
- Author: Herman Koch
- Original title: Het Diner
- Translator: Sam Garrett
- Language: Dutch
- Genre: Novel
- Publisher: Anthos
- Publication date: 2009
- Publication place: Netherlands
- English publication date: 2012 United Kingdom, 2013 USA
- Media type: Print

The Dinner (Dutch: Het Diner) is a novel by the Dutch author Herman Koch. The book was first published by Ambo Anthos in 2009. It was translated into English by Sam Garrett, published in Great Britain in 2012, and the United States in 2013. The book became an international bestseller with many translations and has been adapted into five films.

== Plot ==
The story is narrated by Paul Lohman, a former history teacher. He and his wife Claire meet at a fancy restaurant in Amsterdam with his elder brother Serge, a prominent politician and contender for the position of Prime Minister of the Netherlands, and his wife Babette. The plan is to discuss over dinner how to handle a crime committed by their respective teenage sons, Michel and Rick. The violent act of the two boys had been filmed by a security camera and shown on TV, but, so far, they have not been identified. The parents have to decide on what to do. They debate over dinner causing tension throughout the evening.

== Composition ==
The book belongs to the genre of stories told by an unreliable narrator. The story is organized in sections that are headed by the sequential courses of the dinner, from aperitif to digestif, and frequently interrupted by some form of disruption during the meal as well as flashbacks. The novel starts with what appears to be a skeptical "attitude towards the fashionable, the fancy and the fussy" that may appeal to the reader only to turn—"slowly and fiendishly"—to make the reader think about the nature of their own indignations.

== Reception ==
By 2012 the book had already sold a million copies in Europe.

Arifa Akbar (The Independent) noted that the "sly" and "riveting" novel seems to head in one direction, then "is galloping down another, unexpected path" and finds that it "may thrill, chill or cheat", whereby its "spectacular style triumphs over substance". The book was twice reviewed by The New York Times. Janet Maslin found the morality of the story "really sickening", none of the four characters at the dinner is "really sane" and compared it negatively to Gillian Flynn’s Gone Girl where the characters are vicious but also sympathetic. Claire Messud noted a "bracing nastiness" in the book as more and more secrets are disclosed. She opines that The Dinner is, to some extent, "attuned to a distinctly European society, one simultaneously more ostentatious in its apparent "civilization" and more ashamed of its underlying savagery". Alex Preston (The Guardian) indicated that the book is about the nature of evil and found it to be a well-paced and entertaining novel that shows "brutal violent creatures" under "the thin facades of decency and manners." Lisa Zeidner (The Washington Post) recognized black humor in the novel as in the unlikely choice of a public restaurant for the delicate discussion. She opined that Koch illustrates the absurdities of our privileged daily lives and pokes fun at "Dutch mediocrity".

== Film adaptations ==
- Het Diner (2013), Dutch film directed by Menno Meyjes
- I nostri ragazzi (2014), Italian film directed by Ivano De Matteo
- The Dinner (2017), American film directed by Oren Moverman
- A Normal Family (2023), South Korean film directed by Hur Jin-ho
- Fuse^{(pt)} (2024), Brazilian film directed by Pedro Waddington and Rebeca Diniz
