= Anesthesia (2015 film) =

2015 American film by Tim Blake Nelson

- Theatrical release poster
- Directed by: Tim Blake Nelson
- Written by: Tim Blake Nelson
- Produced by: Julie Buck; Josh Hetzler; John Molli; Tim Blake Nelson; Christopher J. Scott
- Starring: Glenn Close; K. Todd Freeman; Jessica Hecht; Gretchen Mol; Tim Blake Nelson; Gloria Reuben; Kristen Stewart; Corey Stoll; Mickey Sumner; Yul Vazquez; Sam Waterston; Michael Kenneth Williams
- Cinematography: Christina Voros
- Edited by: Mako Kamitsuna
- Music by: Jeff Danna
- Production companies: Nicholson International Pictures; Hello Please; Grand Schema; Red Barn Films
- Distributed by: IFC Films
- Release dates: April 22, 2015 (Tribeca Film Festival); January 8, 2016 (United States)
- Running time: 90 minutes
- Country: United States
- Language: English
- Box office: $26,799

Anesthesia is a 2015 American indie drama film written, produced and directed by Tim Blake Nelson. Nelson stars in the film with Sam Waterston, Kristen Stewart, Glenn Close, Gretchen Mol, and Corey Stoll. The film premiered at the Tribeca Film Festival on April 22, 2015. The film was released in a limited release and through video on demand by IFC Films on January 8, 2016.

== Plot ==
Philosophy professor Walter Zarrow is wounded during a mugging. To escape, he rings buzzers indiscriminately, waking Sam, a middle-aged father of two having an affair in the city. Sam reluctantly answers Zarrow's pleas, and Zarrow loses consciousness in his arms. Through an exploration of why these men, along with the mugger, and an addict named Joe, come together, we explore New York City. The experience of Zarrow, Sam, Joe, and Zarrow's assailant ripple quickly out to include the connected lives of a housewife struggling with alcoholism, a stoner teen desperate to lose his virginity, a brilliant but failed writer fighting addiction, two parents confronting the prospect of terminal illness, and a brilliant grad student who harms herself to feel alive.

== Cast ==
- Sam Waterston as Professor Walter Zarrow
- Tim Blake Nelson as Adam Zarrow
- Kristen Stewart as Sophie
- Glenn Close as Marcia Zarrow
- Gretchen Mol as Sarah
- K. Todd Freeman as Joe
- Mickey Sumner as Nicole
- Julia Morrison as Shani
- Rob Morgan as Parnell
- Lee Wilkof as Ray Eisenberg
- Hannah Marks as Ella Zarrow
- Katie Chang as Amy
- Corey Stoll as Sam
- Michael K. Williams as Jeffrey
- Gloria Reuben as Meredith
- Scott Cohen as Dr. Laffer
- Yul Vazquez as Dr. Edward Barnes
- Natasha Gregson Wagner as Marta
- Jessica Hecht as Jill
- Richard Thomas as Mr. Werth
- Lucas Hedges as Greg
- Ekaterina Samsonov as Angie
- Patrick Kerr as Jerry
- Philip Ettinger as Roger

== Production ==
The filming took place in November 2013 in Manhattan.

== Release ==
The film had its world premiere at 2015 Tribeca Film Festival on April 22, 2015. Shortly after, IFC Films acquired U.S distribution rights. The film was released in a limited release and through video on demand on January 8, 2016.

== Reception ==
On Rotten Tomatoes, Anesthesia has a score of 27% with an average rating of 4.8/10, based on 45 reviews. The website's critics consensus reads: "Anesthesia's incredible cast is wasted on a sloppily-assembled drama whose grand ambitions are undermined by a flawed screenplay." Metacritic gives the film a score of 55 out of 100, sampled from 19 reviews, signifying "mixed or average" reviews.

Anesthesia premiered at the 2015 Tribeca Film Festival to generally positive reviews. Dan Callahan of TheWrap gave the film a positive review and praised the performances: "Writer-director Tim Blake Nelson avoids sentimentality in a contemporary drama suffused with anger and vitality" and "It is the anger that runs through 'Anesthesia' that gives it its flavor, its mood, and its ultimate gravity. This film demands to be taken very seriously, and it earns that right. The woebegone despair that is ever-present in Nelson’s face on screen also suffuses the best of his writing here as well as in his direction of Stewart, with whom he joins forces very dynamically."

John DeFore of The Hollywood Reporter wrote: "Any viewer entering the film without wanting to hug Waterston will have a crush by the picture's end, with the actor perfectly embodying a flavor of learned humanism that carries us through a couple of more abstractly angst discussions of society's decay."

David D'Arcy of Screen International praised the film as well: "This finely acted, tender, drama is one of the surprises of the Tribeca Film Festival" and "No surprise, acting is the film’s most obvious strength. Probably due to a low budget and the many schedules that Nelson had to juggle, the style is remarkably natural."
