= Willie Nelson & Family =

2023 television series

- Genre: Documentary
- Created by: Oren Moverman; Thom Zimny
- Starring: Willie Nelson; Wynton Marsalis; Dolly Parton; Norah Jones; Sheryl Crow; Kenny Chesney; Brenda Lee; Neil Reshen
- Country of origin: United States
- Original language: English
- No. of episodes: 4

Production
- Executive producers: Taylor Sheridan; Oren Moverman; Thom Zimny; Eddie Vaisman; Keith Wortman; Julia Lebedev; Mark Rothbaum
- Running time: 48-52 minutes
- Production companies: Blackbird Presents; Sight Unseen

Original release
- Network: Paramount+
- Release: December 21, 2023

Willie Nelson & Family is a 2023 American 4-part documentary by filmmakers Oren Moverman and Thom Zimny. Jointly produced by Blackbird Presents and Sight Unseen, the series premiered on Paramount+ on December 21, 2023.

In advance of the series premiere, the documentary received a preview screening at the 2023 Sundance Film Festival.

The series is an Outstanding Arts & Culture Documentary 2024 Emmy nominee.

== Premise ==
The first authorized work exploring the seven-decade career of musician, singer, and songwriter Willie Nelson.
