= Time Out of Mind (2014 film) =

2014 film

- Theatrical release poster
- Directed by: Oren Moverman
- Screenplay by: Oren Moverman
- Story by: Jeffrey Caine; Oren Moverman
- Produced by: Miranda Bailey; Richard Gere; Lawrence Inglee; Caroline Kaplan; Bill Pohlad; Edward Walson
- Starring: Richard Gere; Ben Vereen; Jena Malone; Kyra Sedgwick; Steve Buscemi
- Cinematography: Bobby Bukowski
- Edited by: Alex Hall
- Production companies: Blackbird; Cold Iron Pictures; Gere Productions; QED International; River Road Entertainment
- Distributed by: IFC Films
- Release dates: September 7, 2014 (TIFF); September 11, 2015 (United States)
- Running time: 121 minutes
- Country: United States
- Language: English
- Box office: $152,121

Time Out of Mind is a 2014 American drama film written and directed by Oren Moverman and starring Richard Gere, Jena Malone, Ben Vereen, Kyra Sedgwick, and Steve Buscemi. It was released on September 11, 2015, by IFC Films.

== Plot ==
Set in the urban cacophony of New York City, the story begins with the mild-mannered but confused George (Gere) being thrown out from an apartment by Art (Buscemi). Later viewers find out this apartment was not his, but rented to an evicted acquaintance, whom he calls "Sheila" (Sedgwick). From the start, George is indigent; he claims that someone has stolen his wallet. One can only guess he had been living on the edge for a while. Several attempted telephone calls yield no help, and George is forced to sleep on the streets.

At one point, seeking warmth, he sits at a public hospital emergency room where he is approached by staff nurse Maire (Hughes) who treats him with compassion. Up until shortly before the end of the film, he is denying to others and himself that he is homeless, George pawns his belongings to buy liquor, later only beer. He eventually gets a bed at a homeless shelter, where he befriends the mentally unstable but friendly Dixon (Vereen).

Dixon keeps George company as the latter goes through the trials of applying for public benefits. His eventual meeting with the advocate Laura (Datz) leads to more self-realizations about the help he needs. Seeking reconciliation with his estranged daughter Maggie (Malone), his vulnerability is palpable. He appears "guiltily obsessed with somehow reconnecting with her". Throughout the story, as George's character and background become more evident, he also becomes increasingly anhedonic; the only moments of joy seem to be when he enjoys an occasional six-pack. The story ends with George reaching out to Maggie in hopes for forgiveness and support.

== Cast ==
- Richard Gere as George
- Ben Vereen as Dixon
- Jena Malone as Maggie
- Kyra Sedgwick as Karen / Fake Sheila
- Steve Buscemi as Art
- Danielle Brooks as The Receptionist
- Jeremy Strong as Jack
- Thom Bishops as Ameer
- Yul Vazquez as Raoul
- Brian d'Arcy James as Mark
- Geraldine Hughes as Maire
- Lisa Datz as Laura
- Tonye Patano as Ms. Jackson
- Colman Domingo as Mr. Oyello

== Production ==
On January 29, 2014, the film was announced, with filming set to begin in March 2014.

== Release ==
The film premiered at the 2014 Toronto International Film Festival on September 7, 2014. On October 20, 2014, IFC Films acquired distribution rights to the film. The film was released on September 11, 2015, by IFC Films.

== Reception ==
Time Out of Mind received generally positive reviews from critics. On Rotten Tomatoes, the film has a rating of 80%, based on 88 reviews, with a rating of 6.91/10. The site's critical consensus reads, "Time Out of Mind demands patience, yet its noble intentions – and Richard Gere's committed performance – are difficult to deny." On Metacritic, the film has a score of 75 out of 100, based on 25 critics, indicating "generally favorable reviews".

Alan Scherstuhl of The Village Voice gave the film a positive review, saying "Time Out of Mind is an experiment in empathy, an examination of bureaucracy and streetlife mundanity, and a movie that many will find a tough sit." Joe Neumaier of the New York Daily News gave the film five out of five stars, saying "Never less than powerful. Without sentimentality or gloss, it illuminates a part of city life that far too often is lost in the shadows." Peter Travers of Rolling Stone gave the film three and a half stars out of four, saying "Gere, who has shockingly never been nominated for an Oscar, is intuitive and indelible. Maybe it's naive to think a movie like this can heighten our awareness, even change things. So what. Godspeed." Rex Reed of The New York Observer gave the film three out of four stars, saying "Time Out of Mind is not sentimental or overly plotted. It's just a sober, emotionally direct film of subtle observance on the road to Hell."

David Lewis of the San Francisco Chronicle gave the film two out of four stars, saying "It's memorable in the sense that it has an unsettling and disorienting and even educational effect, yet as a work of drama, it's often an exercise in drudgery." Ella Taylor of NPR gave the film a positive review, saying "Gere is extraordinary here, and it says something about his disciplined, inward-facing performance, and about the movie's subtle visual strategies, that he's in almost every frame of Time Out of Mind, but only rarely at the center of it." Devan Coggan of Entertainment Weekly gave the film a B, saying "Even though Time Out of Mind's two-hour run time can be tough to sit through, Gere gives a subtle, layered performance as a man barely existing on the edges of society." A. O. Scott of The New York Times gave the film a positive review, saying "This movie's best and truest quality may be its wandering, episodic rhythm, which is intriguing in its own right and reflects the experience of the main character."
