= Claudia Kim =

South Korean actress (born 1985)

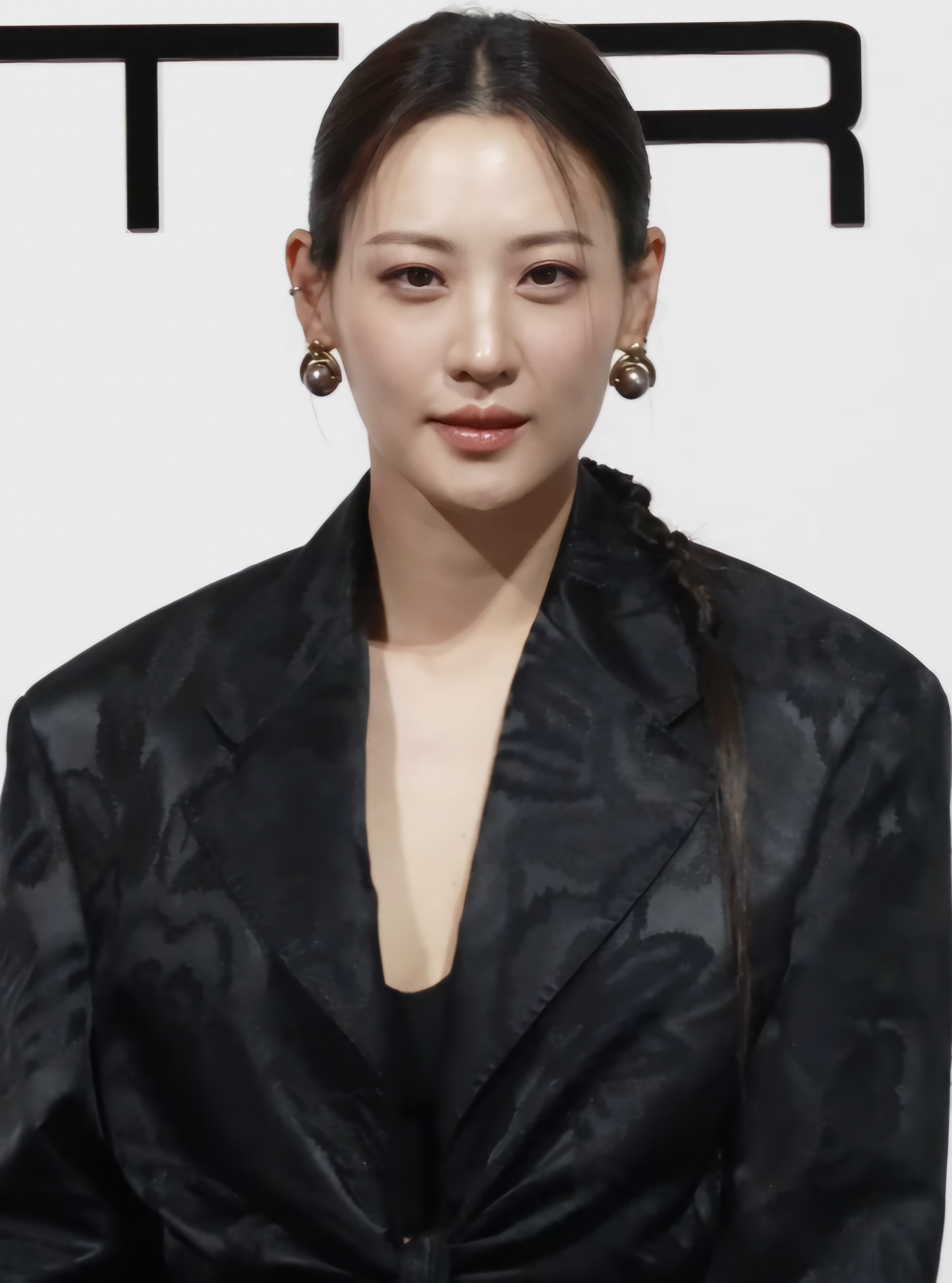
- Kim in August 2024
- Born: 25 January 1985 (age 41); Seoul, South Korea
- Education: Ewha Womans University (International Studies)
- Occupations: Actress; model
- Years active: 2004–present
- Agent(s): Saram Entertainment (Korea); United Talent Agency (United States)
- Spouse: Matthew Shampine (m. 2019; div. 2024)
- Children: 1

Korean name
- Hangul: 김수현
- RR: Gim Suhyeon
- MR: Kim Suhyŏn

Kim Soo-hyun (Korean: 김수현; born 25 January 1985), better known by the stage name Claudia Kim (클로디아 킴), is a South Korean actress and model. She has appeared in Western films such as Avengers: Age of Ultron (2015), The Dark Tower (2017), and Fantastic Beasts: The Crimes of Grindelwald (2018), as well as in Korean dramas such as Queen of the Game (2006–2007), Gyeongseong Creature (2023–2024), and The Atypical Family (2024).

== Early life ==
Kim was born as Kim Soo-hyun in South Korea, on 25 January 1985. She spent six years of her childhood in the United States before returning to South Korea. Her dream in middle school was to become an international lawyer, and in high school she hoped to become a TV anchor. She was inspired by watching CNN's headline news anchor Karuna Shinsho in Asia. She completed her studies abroad to continue her dream of becoming an anchor and entered Ewha Womans University as an International Studies (DIS) major. While enrolled, she worked as a reporter and announcer for three years in the school's English-language newspaper, Ewha Voice. She also worked as an intern reporter for The Korea Times and Arirang TV.

== Career ==
Kim's interests in music, film, and other entertainment led her to participate in a Korea-China modeling competition in 2005, which she won top prize in. Kim was the first winner of the award who had never worked as a model.

Producer Oh Se-kang saw Kim on a morning talk show, which led to her acting debut in the television series Queen of the Game (2006). Kim plays Park Joo-won, a friend of Lee Shin-jeon (Joo Jin-mo) and a law firm's international lawyer who loves him. For the drama, she won the New Star award at the 2006 SBS Awards for Acting.

Kim went on to appear in supporting roles in medical drama Brain (2011) and spy comedy 7th Grade Civil Servant (2013), as well as a leading role in the sitcom Standby (2012). Kim gained international attention for her roles in Marco Polo (2014) and Avengers: Age of Ultron (2015).

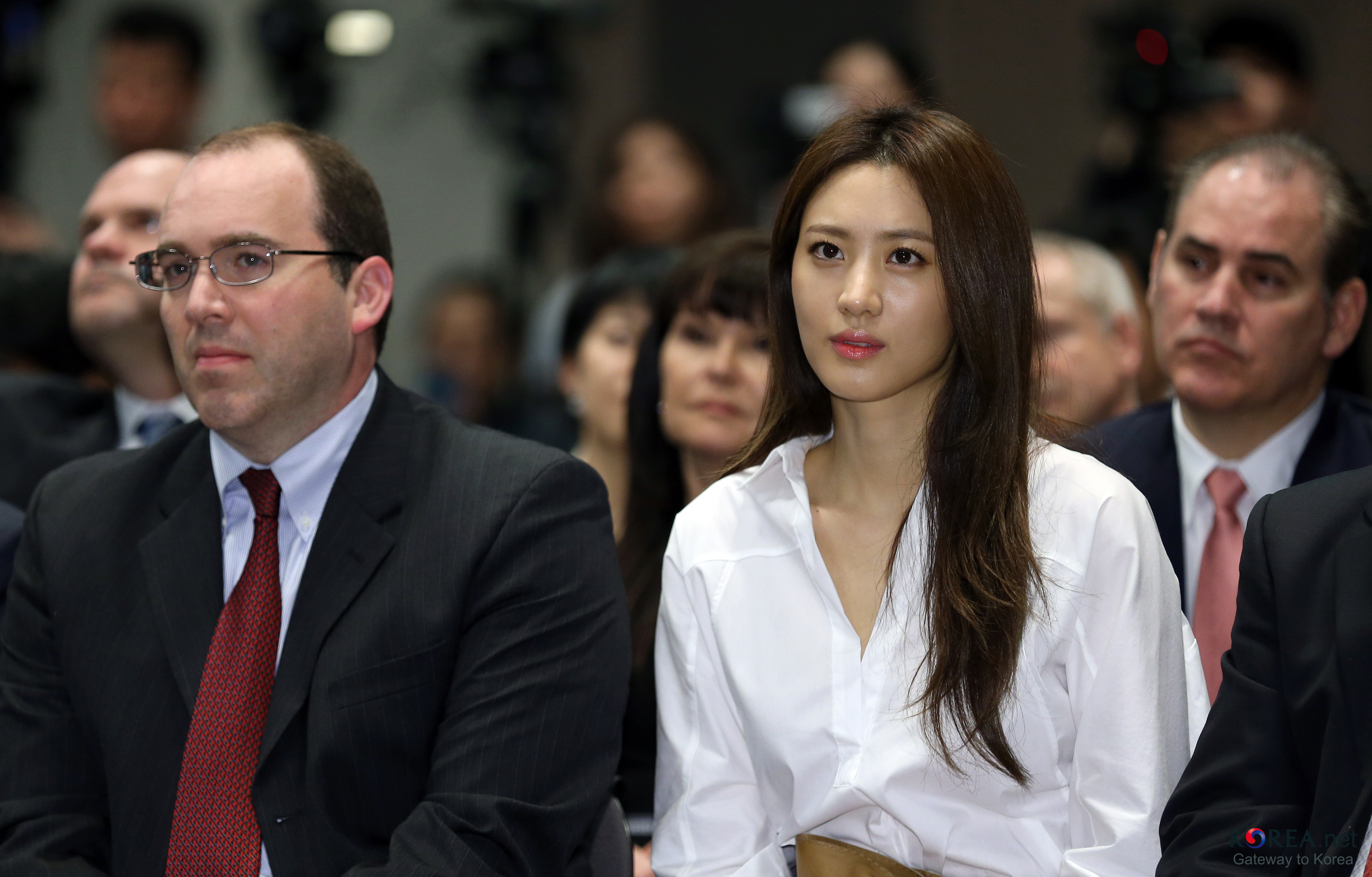
Kim during the memorandum of understanding signing ceremony between Korea Film Commission and Marvel Studios (2014)

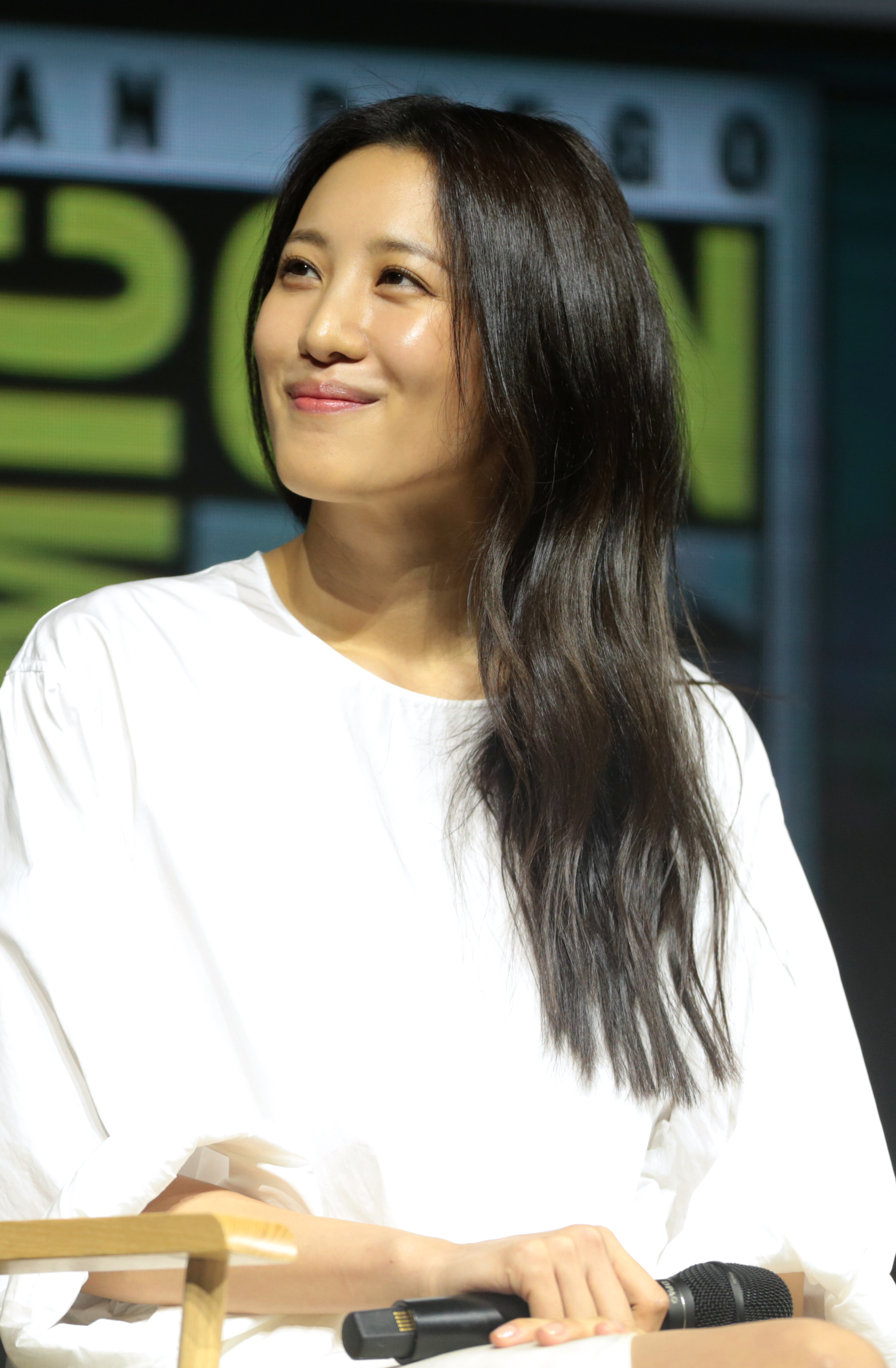
Kim at the 2018 San Diego Comic-Con

Kim portrays Nagini in the 2018 film Fantastic Beasts: The Crimes of Grindelwald.

In 2019, Italian fashion house Max Mara invited her to attend the annual "Women in Film Gala", which has advocated for women and gender equality in the entertainment industry since 1973. Hence, she became the first Korean actress to attend that event.

In March 2021, Kim signed with new agency YG Entertainment.

In 2023, Kim appeared in the 1945 historical drama Gyeongseong Creature, which aired on Netflix.

In May 2025, Kim signed with new agency Saram Entertainment. In September she hosted the closing ceremony of 30th Busan International Film Festival.

== Personal life ==
Kim is a pescetarian.

Kim married Korean-American businessman Matthew Shampine on 14 December 2019, at the Hotel Shilla in Seoul. They have a daughter, born on 1 October 2020. Kim announced her divorce after five years of marriage on 23 September 2024.

== Filmography ==
=== Film ===
Year	Title	Role	Notes	Ref.
2015	Avengers: Age of Ultron	Dr. Helen Cho		
2015	Equals	The Collective (voice)		
2017	The Dark Tower	Arra Champignon		
2018	Fantastic Beasts: The Crimes of Grindelwald	Nagini		
2023	A Normal Family	Jisoo		

=== Television ===
Year	Title	Role	Notes	Ref.
2006–2007	Queen of the Game	Park Joo-won		
2010	The Fugitive: Plan B	Sophie		
2011	Romance Town	Hwang Joo-won		
2011–2012	Brain	Jang Yoo-jin		
2012	Standby	Kim Soo-hyun		
2013	7th Grade Civil Servant	Kim Mi-rae		
2014–2016	Marco Polo	Khutulun		
2016	Monster	Yoo Sung-ae		
2021	Chimera	Yoo-jin		
2022	Behind Every Star	herself	Cameo	
2023–2024	Gyeongseong Creature	Yukiko Maeda	Season 1-2	
2024	The Atypical Family	Bok Dong-hee		

== Awards and nominations ==
Name of the award ceremony, year presented, category, nominee of the award, and the result of the nomination
Award ceremony	Year	Category	Nominee / Work	Result	Ref.
Baeksang Arts Awards	2025	Best Supporting Actress – Film	A Normal Family	Won	
Blue Dragon Series Awards	2025	Best Supporting Actress	Gyeongseong Creature 2	Nominated	
Buil Film Awards	2025	Best Supporting Actress	A Normal Family	Nominated	
MBC Entertainment Awards	2012	Excellence Award, Actress in a Comedy/Sitcom	Standby	Won	
SBS Drama Awards	2006	New Star Award	Queen of the Game	Won	
