= Junction 48 =

2016 film

- Film poster
- Directed by: Udi Aloni
- Written by: Oren Moverman; Tamer Nafar
- Produced by: Udi Aloni; Stefan Arndt; Lawrence Inglee; David Silber; Yasmin Zaher
- Starring: Tamer Nafar; Samar Qupty
- Cinematography: Amnon Zlayet
- Edited by: Jay Rabinowitz
- Music by: Tamer Nafar; Itamar Ziegler
- Release dates: 13 February 2016 (Berlin); 5 May 2016 (Israel)
- Running time: 97 minutes
- Country: Israel
- Languages: Arabic; Hebrew

Junction 48 is a 2016 Israeli drama film directed by Udi Aloni, co-written by Oren Moverman and the film's star Tamer Nafar. It was shown in the Panorama section at the 66th Berlin International Film Festival where it won the Audience Award. It received the Best International Narrative Feature award at the 2016 Tribeca Festival.

== Plot ==
Karim, a young Arab from Lod, works for the Execution Office's Customer Service, and lives among drug dealers in the Middle East drug capital, but dreams of being a musician. The plot takes place in Lod and the character of Karim is based on the Palestinian rapper Tamer Nafar (who also plays his role), and who wrote the screenplay with Oren Moverman, as well as composed the music for the film (along with Itamar Ziegler of the Balkan Beat Box).

== Cast ==
- Tamer Nafar as Kareem
- Samar Qupty as Manar
- Salwa Nakkara as Kareem's mother
- Saeed Dassuki as Talal
- Adeeb Safadi as Yousef
- Tarik Kopty as Abu Abdallah, Talal's father
- Sameh Zakout as Amir
- Ayed Fadel as Hussam
- Hisham Suliman as Shaikh
- Mariam Abu Khaled as Mariam
