= You Were Never Really Here =

2017 film by Lynne Ramsay

- Theatrical release poster
- Directed by: Lynne Ramsay
- Screenplay by: Lynne Ramsay
- Based on: You Were Never Really Here by Jonathan Ames
- Produced by: Rosa Attab; Pascal Caucheteux; James Wilson; Lynne Ramsay; Rebecca O'Brien
- Starring: Joaquin Phoenix; Judith Roberts; Ekaterina Samsonov; John Doman; Alex Manette; Dante Pereira-Olson; Alessandro Nivola
- Cinematography: Thomas Townend
- Edited by: Joe Bini
- Music by: Jonny Greenwood
- Production companies: Film4; BFI; Why Not Productions; Page 114
- Distributed by: StudioCanal (United Kingdom); SND Films (France)
- Release dates: 27 May 2017 (Cannes); 8 November 2017 (France); 9 March 2018 (United Kingdom); 6 April 2018 (United States)
- Running time: 90 minutes
- Countries: United Kingdom; France
- Language: English
- Box office: $9.4 million

You Were Never Really Here (released as A Beautiful Day in France and Germany) is a 2017 neo-noir crime psychological thriller film written and directed by Lynne Ramsay. Based on the 2013 novella of the same name by Jonathan Ames, it stars Joaquin Phoenix, Ekaterina Samsonov, Alex Manette, John Doman, and Judith Roberts. In the film, a traumatized mercenary named Joe (Phoenix) is hired by a politician to find and rescue his daughter who has been kidnapped by a human trafficking network in New York City, which Joe is instructed to destroy by any violent means. The film was co-produced between the United Kingdom and France.

An early cut premiered at the 2017 Cannes Film Festival in competition, where Ramsay won the award for Best Screenplay and Phoenix the award for Best Actor. The film was released by StudioCanal in the UK, on 9 March 2018, and by Amazon Studios in the U.S., where it began a limited release in Los Angeles and New York on 6 April 2018, and a wide release on 20 April. It received critical acclaim, with Ramsay's direction and Phoenix's performance garnering high praise.

== Plot ==
Joe is a traumatized hired gun who specializes in rescuing trafficked girls, using brutal methods against their captors. He cares for his elderly mother in his childhood home in New York City. Joe has flashbacks of the abuse he and his mother endured from his violent father, and of his brutal past in the military and FBI, and is troubled by suicidal thoughts.

As he comes home one night, Joe is seen by Moises, the son of Angel, who acts as middleman between Joe and his handler, John McCleary. Joe tells McCleary that Angel knows his address and may pose a security risk. McCleary assigns Joe a new job from Albert Votto, a New York State Senator. Votto has offered a large sum of money to discreetly rescue his abducted daughter, Nina. He gives Joe the address of a brothel for wealthy patrons sent via an anonymous text. Joe stakes out the brothel, kills several security guards and patrons, and rescues Nina. While Joe and Nina await Votto's arrival in a hotel room, the news reports that Votto has committed suicide. Police officers gain access to the room with the help of the desk clerk, kill the clerk, and take Nina. Joe escapes after killing an officer sent to kill him.

Joe finds that government agents killed McCleary, Angel, and Moises while searching for Joe's address. Arriving back at his home, Joe discovers that two agents have murdered his mother and have been waiting for him. He kills one agent and mortally wounds the other. As the agent is dying, he reveals that Votto and Governor Williams are pedophiles and child traffickers and that Nina is Williams's favorite. He explains that Williams is directing the authorities to cover up the trafficking. Joe drives to a lake in a forest to give his mother a water burial and fills his pockets with stones, with the intent of killing himself. As he sinks, he has a vision of Nina. Removing the stones from his pockets, he swims back to the surface.

Joe follows Williams to his country home and fights his way in, only to discover Williams with his throat slit. He searches the house and discovers Nina, who is seated at a dining room table, alongside a bloody straight razor. Although Joe has become increasingly upset, Nina reassures him that she is alright. The two go to a diner to discuss their future. Joe has a violent suicidal fantasy and passes out. Nina wakes him, saying, "It's a beautiful day." He agrees, and they leave together.

== Cast ==
- Joaquin Phoenix as Joe
  - Dante Pereira-Olson as Young Joe
- Ekaterina Samsonov as Nina Votto
- Alex Manette as Senator Albert Votto
- John Doman as John McCleary
- Judith Roberts as Joe's Mother
- Alessandro Nivola as Governor Williams
- Frank Pando as Angel
- Vinicius Damasceno as Moises

== Production ==
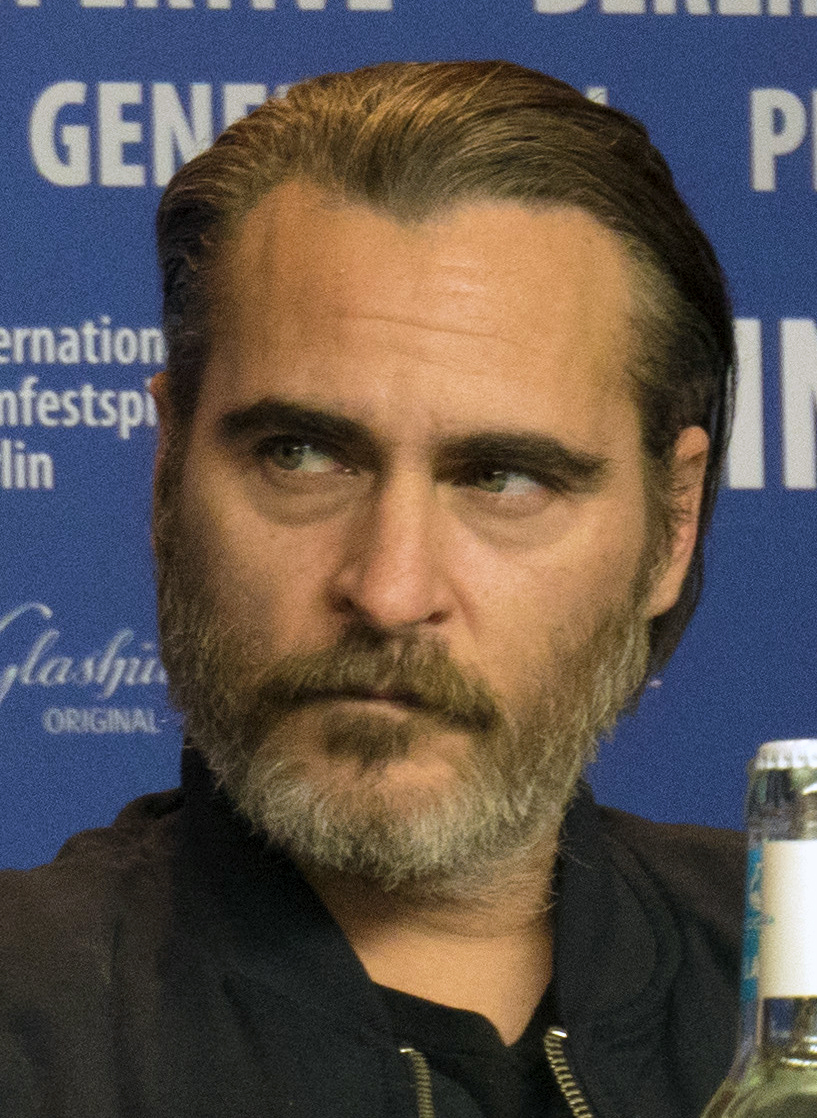
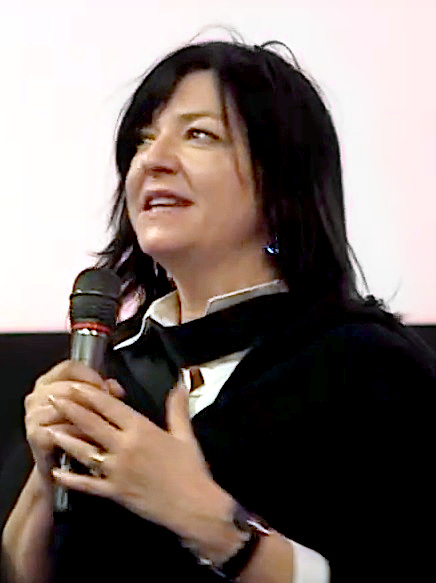
Joaquin Phoenix’s performance and Lynne Ramsay’s direction garnered praise from critics at Cannes, where they won Best Actor and Best Screenplay, respectively.

On 11 May 2016, it was reported that Lynne Ramsay would write and direct an adaptation of Jonathan Ames' novella You Were Never Really Here, starring Joaquin Phoenix. The project would be shopped to Cannes buyers. Although it was initially reported that A24 had acquired the project for $2 million, Amazon Studios bought U.S. rights to You Were Never Really Here for around $3.5 million on 13 May 2016. Principal photography took place during August 2016 in and around New York City. Some interior scenes were shot at Kaufman Astoria Studios. On 2 May 2017, it was confirmed that composer Jonny Greenwood would score the film. The film was still a work in progress when it premiered at the Cannes Film Festival on 27 May 2017.

== Reception ==
=== Critical response ===
On Rotten Tomatoes, the film holds an approval rating of 89% based on 285 reviews, with an average rating of 8.3/10. The website's critical consensus reads, "Bracingly elevated by a typically committed lead performance from Joaquin Phoenix, You Were Never Really Here confirms writer-director Lynne Ramsay as one of modern cinema's most unique—and uncompromising—voices." On Metacritic, the film has a weighted average score of 84 out of 100, based on 41 critics, indicating "universal acclaim".

Sheila O'Malley of RogerEbert.com gave the film 4 out of 4 stars, saying that the film "is a taut and almost unbearably intense 90-minutes, without an ounce of fat on it. Ramsay doesn't give you a second to breathe." Guy Lodge for Variety said Ramsay may be the world's "greatest working filmmaker," and called the film "astonishing... a stark, sinewy, slashed-to-the-bone hitman thriller far more concerned with the man than the hit."

Critics Leah Pickett and Abraham Raphael noted similarities between You Were Never Really Here and the 1976 film Taxi Driver with both films involving friendships between an adult male and a child victim of prostitution and exploring the seedy underworld of New York City.

=== Accolades ===
Award	Date of ceremony	Category	Recipients	Result	Ref.
British Academy Film Awards	10 February 2019	Outstanding British Film	Lynne Ramsay, Rosa Attab, Pascal Caucheteux, and James Wilson	Nominated	
British Independent Film Awards	2 December 2018	Best British Independent Film	Lynne Ramsay, Pascal Caucheteux, Rosa Attab, James Wilson and Rebecca O’Brien	Nominated	
British Independent Film Awards	2 December 2018	Best Director	Lynne Ramsay	Nominated	
British Independent Film Awards	2 December 2018	Best Actor	Joaquin Phoenix	Nominated	
British Independent Film Awards	2 December 2018	Best Screenplay	Lynne Ramsay	Nominated	
British Independent Film Awards	2 December 2018	Best Cinematography	Thomas Townend	Nominated	
British Independent Film Awards	2 December 2018	Best Editing	Joe Bini	Nominated	
British Independent Film Awards	2 December 2018	Best Music	Jonny Greenwood	Won	
British Independent Film Awards	2 December 2018	Best Sound	You Were Never Really Here	Won	
Cannes Film Festival	28 May 2017	Palme d'Or	You Were Never Really Here	Nominated	
Cannes Film Festival	28 May 2017	Best Actor	Joaquin Phoenix	Won	
Cannes Film Festival	28 May 2017	Best Screenplay	Lynne Ramsay	Won	
Independent Spirit Awards	23 February 2019	Best Feature	Rosa Attab, Pascal Caucheteux, Rebecca O’Brien, Lynne Ramsay and James Wilson	Nominated	
Independent Spirit Awards	23 February 2019	Best Director	Lynne Ramsay	Nominated	
Independent Spirit Awards	23 February 2019	Best Male Lead	Joaquin Phoenix	Nominated	
Independent Spirit Awards	23 February 2019	Best Editing	Joe Bini	Won	
Noir Film Festival	9 December 2017	Special Jury Award	Lynne Ramsay	Won	
Noir Film Festival	9 December 2017	Black Lion	You Were Never Really Here	Nominated	
