= Dante Pereira-Olson =

American actor (born 2008)

- Born: August 13, 2008 (age 17); Los Angeles, California; United States
- Occupation: Actor
- Years active: 2014–present
- Notable work: You Were Never Really Here; Joker

Dante Pereira-Olson (born August 13, 2008) is an American child actor best known for his work in You Were Never Really Here and Joker, both starring Joaquin Phoenix.

== Career ==
After appearing on episodes of several television shows, including Last Week Tonight with John Oliver, The Slap (miniseries), Jessica Jones, Happy!, and Mozart in the Jungle, Dante Pereira-Olson landed his first feature-film role in the 2017 film You Were Never Really Here as young Joe. In 2018, he voiced Johnny Moses on the Wolverine podcast. He later gained fame when he was cast as young Bruce Wayne in the 2019 film Joker. In 2020, he voiced Shanerreyus on episode 6 of the animated Netflix series The Midnight Gospel. In 2021, he portrayed Rolf in the drama film Adopting Audrey.

== Filmography ==
=== Film ===
Year	Title	Role	Notes/Ref(s)
2014	Bruno's	Kid Jeff	Short film
2017	You Were Never Really Here	Young Joe	
2019	Joker	Bruce Wayne	
2021	Adopting Audrey	Rolf	

=== Television ===
Year	Title	Role	Notes/Ref(s)
2015	Last Week Tonight with John Oliver	Jeff Campaign Supporter	Episode: "Tobacco"
2015	The Slap	Hero Kid	Episode: "Aisha"
2015	Jessica Jones	Boy	Episode: "AKA Crush Syndrome"
2015	Mozart in the Jungle	5-year-old Bradford	Episode: "Amusia"
2017–18	Happy!	Gerry Scaramucci	Episodes: "Saint Nick", "Year of the Horse", "The Scrapyard of Childish Things", "Destroyer of Worlds"
2020	The Midnight Gospel	Shanerreyus (voice)	Episode: "Vulture with Honor"

=== Podcast ===
Year	Title	Role	Notes/Ref(s)
2018	Wolverine	Johnny Moses	Episode: "Chapter 6: Archaeology of the Night"
