= The Dinner (2013 film) =

2013 film

- Theatrical release poster
- Directed by: Menno Meyjes
- Screenplay by: Menno Meyjes
- Based on: The Dinner by Herman Koch
- Produced by: Hans de Weers
- Starring: Thekla Reuten
- Cinematography: Sander Snoep
- Edited by: Michiel Reichwein
- Music by: Fons Merkins
- Production company: Eyeworks
- Distributed by: A-Film Benelux
- Release dates: 9 September 2013 (TIFF); 7 November 2013 (Netherlands)
- Running time: 88 minutes
- Country: Netherlands
- Language: Dutch
- Box office: $2 million

The Dinner (Dutch: Het Diner) is a 2013 Dutch drama film written for the screen and directed by Menno Meyjes, based on the 2009 novel of the same name by Herman Koch.

The film premiered in the Contemporary World Cinema section at the 2013 Toronto International Film Festival on 9 September 2013 and was released in the Netherlands on 7 November.

== Plot ==
Two sets of wealthy parents: the brothers Serge (Daan Schuurmans) and Paul Lohman (Jacob Derwig) with their wives Babette (Kim van Kooten) and Claire (Thekla Reuten) go out to eat at a fancy restaurant in Amsterdam. Over the course of a lavish meal they talk about everyday life, as if nothing is wrong. The atmosphere is uncomfortable, because their children committed a violent crime, which could destroy their future. They secretly plot to prevent justice from being served.

== Cast ==
- Thekla Reuten as Claire
- Kim van Kooten as Babette
- Daan Schuurmans as Serge
- Jacob Derwig as Paul
- Sabine Soetanto
- Reinout Bussemaker as Rector
- Gusta Geleynse as Dakloze
- Wil van der Meer as Tonio
- Jonas Smulders as Michel

== See also ==
- The Dinner (2014)
- The Dinner (2017)
