= The Dinner (2017 film) =

- Theatrical release poster
- Directed by: Oren Moverman
- Screenplay by: Oren Moverman
- Based on: The Dinner by Herman Koch
- Produced by: Caldecot Chubb; Lawrence Inglee; Julia Lebedev; Eddie Vaisman
- Starring: Richard Gere; Laura Linney; Steve Coogan; Rebecca Hall; Chloë Sevigny
- Cinematography: Bobby Bukowski
- Edited by: Alex Hall
- Music by: Elijah Brueggemann
- Production companies: ChubbCo Film; Code Red; Blackbird
- Distributed by: The Orchard
- Release dates: February 10, 2017 (Berlin); May 5, 2017 (United States)
- Running time: 120 minutes
- Country: United States
- Language: English
- Box office: $2.5 million

The Dinner is a 2017 American psychological thriller film written for the screen and directed by Oren Moverman, based on the 2009 novel of the same name by Herman Koch. It is the third film adaptation of the novel, following the 2013 Dutch film Het Diner and the 2014 Italian film I nostri ragazzi. The film stars Richard Gere, Laura Linney, Steve Coogan, Rebecca Hall, and Chloë Sevigny.

The Dinner premiered at the 67th Berlin International Film Festival on February 10, 2017, and was released in the United States on May 5 by The Orchard. The film received mixed reviews from critics.

== Plot ==
On a snowy evening in Dobbs Ferry, New York, history teacher Paul Lohman, his wife Claire, Paul's congressman brother Stan, and Stan's wife Katelyn meet for dinner at a luxury restaurant that Stan has booked for the four of them. Before dinner, Paul and Claire discuss their son Michael, who is closer to her than him. Meanwhile, Katelyn is clearly upset with Stan. Paul has a contentious relationship with his brother, who is the front runner for governor. Stan and Katelyn are accompanied to the dinner by his aides, who frequently interrupt the meal in regard to a mental health bill he is sponsoring. Paul makes his annoyance with Stan clear to everyone.

In a flashback, Michael and his cousins Rick and Beau (Stan’s children with ex-wife Barbara, Beau an adoptee) encounter a homeless woman trying to sleep in the ATM building that they need to use to get money for a cab ride home. Michael verbally and physically harasses the woman while Rick and Beau look on, but Beau soon leaves. Michael dumps trash on the woman while taunting her. After throwing near-empty cans of flammable material on her, Michael throws lit matches on her sleeping bag, which catches fire and kills her. Michael, who is laughing as he watches the woman burn, records the event on his cell phone.

Throughout the dinner, tensions build up among the group intercut with flashbacks that reveal the dysfunctional family's past, Claire's bout with cancer, and Stan's attempts to help Paul in his depression. They clash over the question of whether the boys should take the blame for their crime or simply cover it up.

Paul, who has taken Michael's phone, finds out that there is a video of the homeless woman's death online that Beau uploaded after he discovered it on Michael's computer. Michael refuses to delete the video from his phone. Paul is also shocked to find that not only does Claire know about the incident (which he thought he was keeping secret from her), she is colluding with Michael in a scheme to pay hush money to Beau.

In another flashback, after Stan and his first wife offer to look after Michael while Claire is in the hospital, Paul becomes angry and hits him on the head with a saucepan. At the dinner, Stan says he wants to immediately withdraw from the gubernatorial race, hold a press conference about the ATM incident, and accompany his son to the police. A bitter argument ensues between Stan on one side and Claire and Katelyn on the other, with Paul sitting quietly away from the table. Katelyn later persuades Stan to hold off on his plan by threatening to leave him if he follows through.

Michael calls his mother and tells her that Beau refused the money. Convinced that Beau will turn in both Michael and Rick, Claire tells Paul they have to take matters into their own hands. Paul admits that he has been off his medications for a few months; Claire admits she has known this but said nothing because she was very lonely and wanted his old self back. She tells Paul that he needs to take care of Beau. When he asks her what she means, she says that he needs to talk with Beau and persuade him not to turn in their son.

Paul leaves the restaurant for Stan's house, looking for Beau, believing that the only solution to the problem is to kill him. Paul finds Beau outside, grabs him by the neck, and prepares to hit him over the head with a rock to prevent him from turning in the other boys. When Stan arrives home along with Katelyn and Claire, he finds Beau missing and, in a rage, punches and kicks Paul, who claims he was just talking to Beau. While Katelyn is trying to phone Beau, Stan gets a call from his aide informing him that the votes needed for the mental health bill are secure. The film ends abruptly as Paul calls everyone "apes with phones" and groans in pain just as Katelyn reaches Beau by phone.

== Cast ==
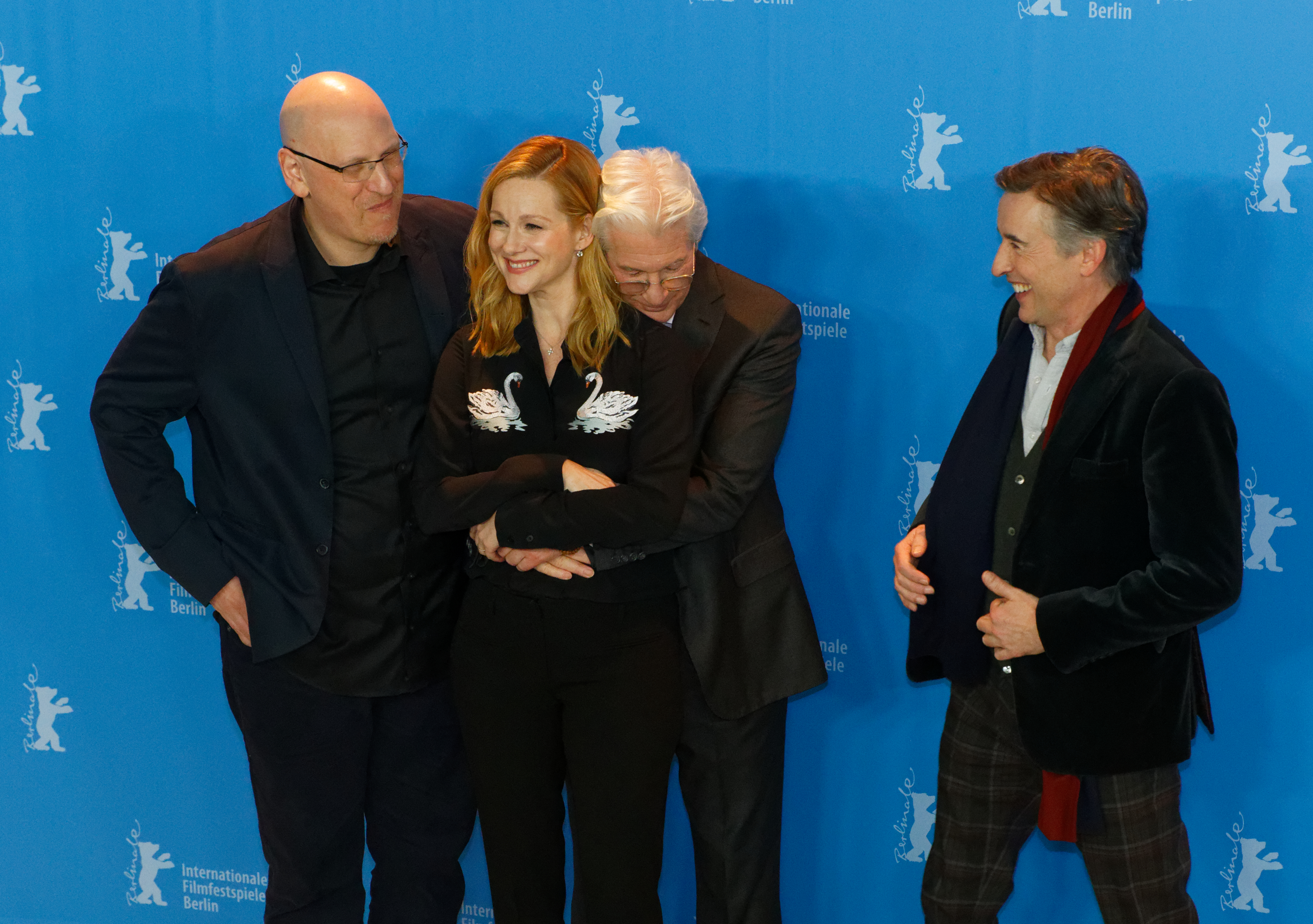
Oren Moverman (left) with the cast at Berlinale 2017

- Richard Gere as Stan Lohman, a congressman who is running for governor
- Steve Coogan as Paul Lohman, brother to Stan and a former high school history teacher
- Laura Linney as Claire Lohman, Paul's wife
- Rebecca Hall as Katelyn Lohman, Stan's wife
- Chloë Sevigny as Barbara Lohman, Stan's ex-wife
- Charlie Plummer as Michael Lohman, the only son of Claire and Paul
- Adepero Oduye as Nina, who works for Stan
- Michael Chernus as Dylan Heinz
- Taylor Rae Almonte as Kamryn Velez
- Joel Bissonnette as Antonio
- Seamus Davey-Fitzpatrick as Rick Lohman, Stan and Barbara's son
- Miles J. Harvey as Beau Lohman, Stan and Barbara's adopted son
- Laura Hajek as Anna, Michael's girlfriend

== Production ==
In September 2013, Cate Blanchett was attached to make her directorial debut with a film adaptation of the Dutch thriller novel The Dinner, by Herman Koch, scripted by Oren Moverman. Caldecot Chubb produced under his ChubbCo Film banner, and Lawrence Inglee, Eddie Vaisman and Julia Lebedev produced the film for Code Red, ChubbCo and Blackbird. Code Red fully financed the film and Protagonist Pictures handled international sales. Olga Segura and Eva Maria Daniels executive produced and helped with the development of the project.

Later, in January 2016, Moverman was hired to direct the film. That same month, Charlie Plummer and Adepero Oduye joined the cast of the film.

=== Filming ===
Principal photography on the film began on January 21, 2016, in Dobbs Ferry, New York. Filming later took place in Gettysburg, Pennsylvania, including at the Gettysburg National Military Park.

== Release ==
In May 2016, The Orchard acquired distribution rights to the film. In 2017, the film had its world premiere at the Berlin International Film Festival on February 10, and went on to screen at the Tribeca Film Festival on April 24. The film was theatrically released on May 5.

=== Critical reception ===
On the review aggregator website Rotten Tomatoes, 46% of 141 critics' reviews are positive. The website's consensus reads: "The Dinner's strong ensemble isn't enough to overcome a screenplay that merely skims the surface of its source material's wit and insight." Metacritic, which uses a weighted average, assigned the film a score of 57 out of 100, based on 30 critics, indicating "mixed or average" reviews.

Owen Gleiberman of Variety gave the film a positive review, writing: "Richard Gere, Laura Linney, Steve Coogan, and Rebecca Hall make a riveting quartet in Oren Moverman's adaptation of the Herman Koch novel about a dark-hearted dinner gathering." Eric Kohn of IndieWire also gave the film a positive review, writing: "The Dinner mostly works so long as it stays at the table, and the unresolvable source of anxiety in play suggests that on some level, the meal never ends." Boyd van Hoeij of The Hollywood Reporter gave the film a negative review, writing: "By trying to keep the prolonged sit-down affair from becoming excessively stagey, Moverman adds too many distracting flashbacks to maintain the original's hard-hitting and well-aimed gut punch."
