= The Dinner (2014 film) =

- Directed by: Ivano De Matteo
- Screenplay by: Valentina Ferlan; Ivano De Matteo
- Based on: The Dinner by Herman Koch
- Produced by: Marco Poccioni; Marco Valsania
- Starring: Alessandro Gassmann; Giovanna Mezzogiorno; Luigi Lo Cascio; Barbora Bobuľová; Rosabell Laurenti Sellers; Jacopo Olmo Antinori
- Cinematography: Vittorio Omodei Zorini
- Edited by: Consuelo Catucci
- Music by: Francesco Cerasi
- Production companies: Rodeo Drive; Rai Cinema
- Distributed by: 01 Distribution
- Release dates: September 4, 2014 (Venice); September 5, 2014 (Italy)
- Running time: 92 minutes
- Box office: $1 million

The Dinner (Italian: I nostri ragazzi) is a 2014 Italian drama film directed by Ivano De Matteo, who co-wrote the screenplay with Valentina Ferlan, loosely based on the 2009 novel of the same name by Herman Koch. It is the second film adaptation of the novel, following the 2013 Dutch film Het Diner.

The film premiered in the Venice Days section at the 71st Venice International Film Festival on September 4, 2014, in which it won the Europa Cinemas Label as Best European Film, and was released in Italy on September 5.

== Cast ==
- Luigi Lo Cascio as Paolo
- Giovanna Mezzogiorno as Chiara
- Alessandro Gassman as Massimo
- Barbora Bobulova as Sofia
- Rosabell Laurenti Sellers as Benedetta
- Jacopo Olmo Antinori as Michele
- Lidia Vitale as Giovanna
- Roberto Accornero as Professor Michele

== See also ==
- The Dinner (2013)
- The Dinner (2017)
