= Herman Koch =

Dutch writer and actor (born 1953)

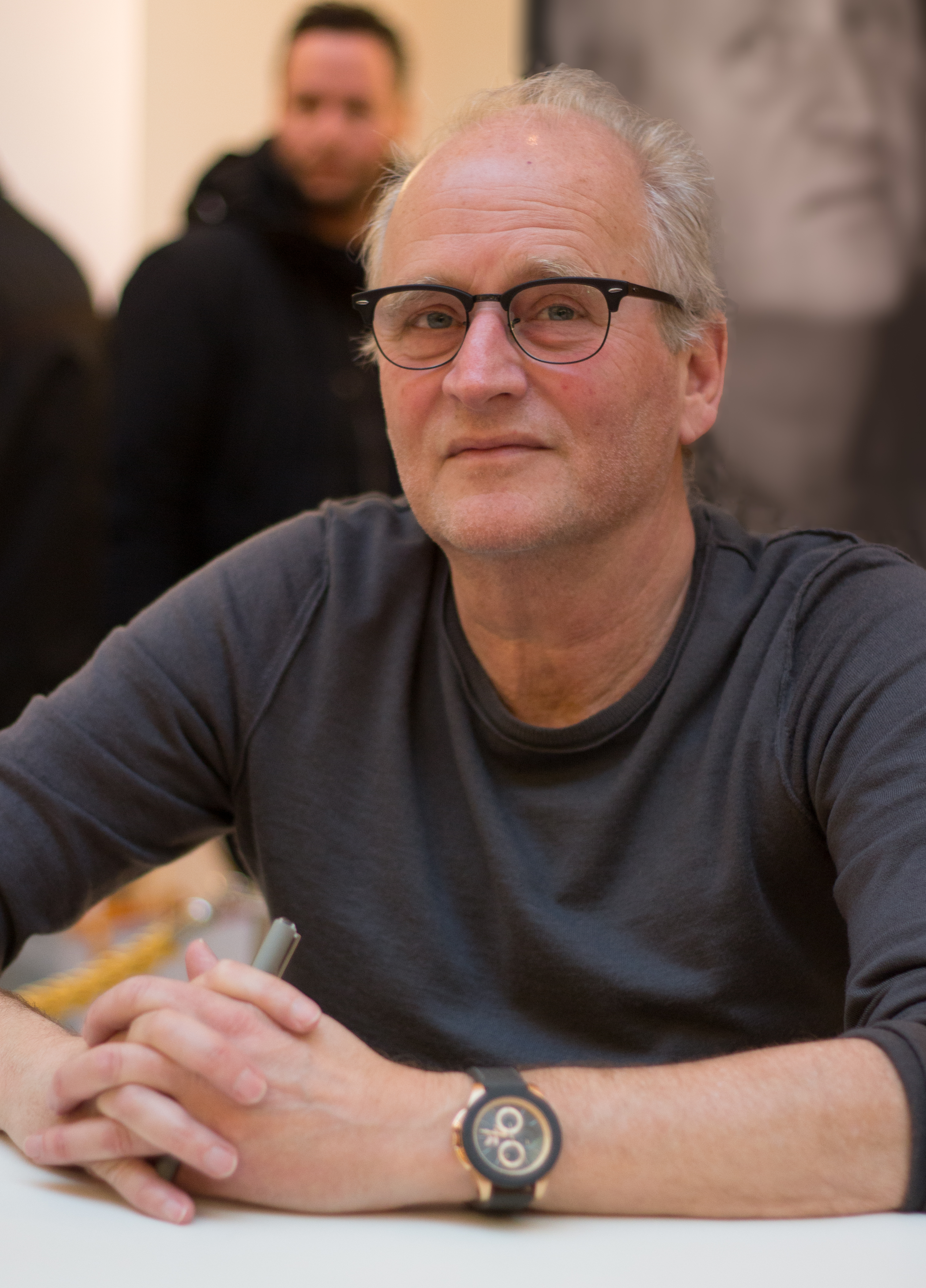
- Herman Koch in 2015
- Born: 5 September 1953 (age 73); Arnhem, Netherlands
- Occupations: Writer, actor
- Spouse: Amalia
- Children: 1
- Writing career
- Pen name: Menno Voorhof
- Period: 1984–present
- Notable work: The Dinner (2009)
- Website: www.hermankoch.com

Herman Koch (Dutch pronunciation: [ˈɦɛrmɑŋ ˈkɔx]; born 5 September 1953) is a Dutch writer and actor. He has written short stories, novels, and columns. His best-selling novel The Dinner (2009) has been translated into 21 languages. He has acted for radio, television, and film. He co-created the long-running TV series Jiskefet (1990–2005).

== Early life and education ==
Herman Koch was born on 5 September 1953 in Arnhem, Netherlands. His family moved to Amsterdam when he was two years old. He went to the Montessori Lyceum Amsterdam from which he was expelled.

== Acting ==
Koch is an actor for radio, television, and film. He contributed to the comedy show Borát (1984–1989) for radio. Together with Kees Prins and Michiel Romeyn, Koch created the long-running absurdist and satiric series Jiskefet (1990–2005; Trash Can) for television, in which he also acted. And he played minor roles in the movies The Flying Liftboy (1998) and Hè, Gezellig (2014; Hey, Cosy), and the TV series The Flying Liftboy (2000) and Voetbalvrouwen (2007; Footballers' Wives).

== Writing ==
Koch is the author of short stories, novels, and columns. His debut was De voorbijganger (1985; The Passerby) with short stories. His first novel was Red ons, Maria Montanelli (1989; Save Us, Maria Montanelli). In 2005, Koch wrote the text for the Grand Dictation of the Dutch Language.

His sixth novel was Het diner (2009; The Dinner), which was translated into 21 languages including English, had sold over one million copies throughout Europe, and won the 2009 NS Audience award (Dutch: NS Publieksprijs). A Dutch play of The Dinner was in theaters in 2012 and a Dutch movie of the book was released in 2013. An Italian movie adaptation, The Dinner (Italian: I Nostri Ragazzi), was released in 2014. An English-language film adaptation, The Dinner, was released in 2017.

Koch's characters are usually highly disagreeable, distrusting and violent, and they often defend questionable morals and extreme views. Underlying themes in their narratives include happiness, mediocrity, disgust, the right to live, cynicism, violence, beauty, and the ugly. Koch's writing style is easy to follow and straightforward.

== Personal life ==
Koch is married to Amalia, and they have a son. Koch is a half-brother of writer Els Pelgrom.

== Bibliography ==
Short stories

- (1985) De voorbijganger (The Passerby)
- (1991) Hansaplast voor een opstandige (Hansaplast for a Rebel), under the pseudonym Menno Voorhof
- (1998) Geen agenda (No Agenda)
- (2001) Schrijven & drinken (Writing & Drinking)
- (2001) Dingetje (Thingy)
- (2003) Alle verhalen (All Stories)
- (2012) Korte geschiedenis van het bedrog (Brief History of Deceit)

Novels

- (1989) Red ons, Maria Montanelli (Save Us, Maria Montanelli)
- (1996) Eindelijk oorlog (War at Last)
- (2000) Eten met Emma (Eating With Emma)
- (2003) Odessa Star (Odessa Star)
- (2005) Denken aan Bruce Kennedy (Thinking About Bruce Kennedy)
- (2009) Het diner; English translation: The Dinner (2012) ISBN 9780770437855
- (2011) Zomerhuis met zwembad; English translation: Summer House with Swimming Pool (2014) ISBN 9780804138819
- (2014) Geachte heer M. (Dear Mr. M.)
- (2016) De greppel (The Ditch)
- (2020) Finse dagen (Finnish Days)
- (2021) Een film met Sophia (A Film With Sophia)
- (2022) Het Koninklijk Huis (The Royal Family)
- (2024) Ga je erover schrijven? (Are You Going to Write About It?)
- (2025) Luchtplaats
- (2026) De overbodigen

Columns

- (1999) Het evangelie volgens Jodocus (The Gospel According To Judoc)
- (2010) De ideale schoonzoon (The Ideal Son-in-law)
