= Oren Moverman =

American film producer

- אורן מוברמן
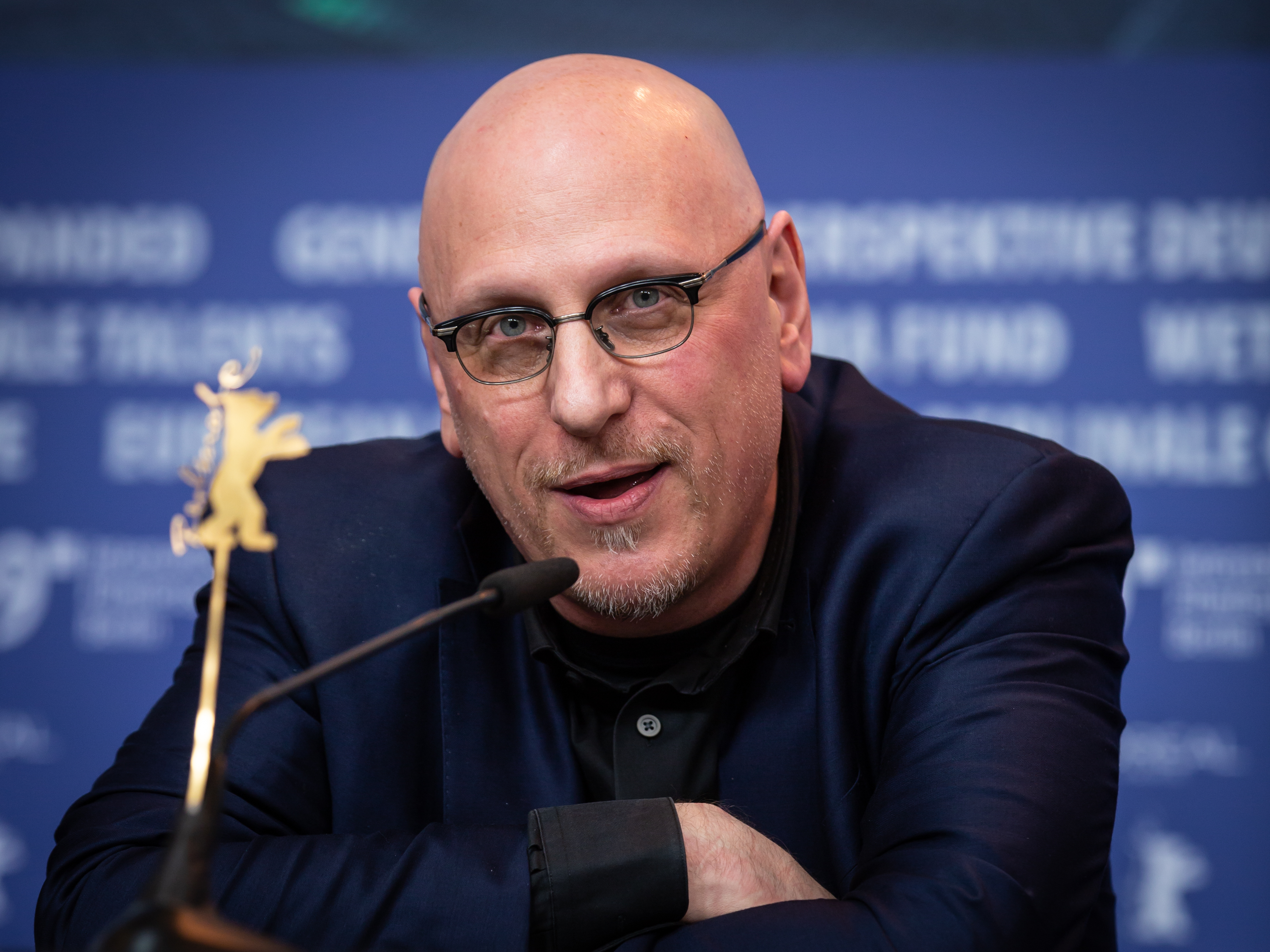
- Oren Moverman at the 69th Berlin International Film Festival in 2019
- Born: July 4, 1966 (age 60); Jaffa, Israel
- Occupations: Screenwriter; film director; film producer

Oren Moverman (Hebrew: אורן מוברמן; born July 4, 1966) is an Israeli-American Academy Award-nominated screenwriter, film director, and Emmy Award-winning film producer. He has directed the films The Messenger, Rampart, Time Out of Mind, and The Dinner. He also directed the Paramount+ documentary series Willie Nelson & Family with Thom Zimny.

== Biography ==
Oren Moverman was born on July 4, 1966 in Jaffa (Yafo), Israel. He is an Ashkenazi Jew of Polish origin. He grew up in Givatayim. From age 13 to 17, he first lived in the United States. After serving in the Israel Defense Forces, he moved to the United States. He graduated from Brooklyn College in 1992.

Moverman started his career as a screenwriter. He wrote screenplays for films such as Jesus' Son, Face, the experimental Bob Dylan biographical film I'm Not There, and Ira Sachs' Married Life, as well as the Brian Wilson biopic Love & Mercy and the Arabic-language hip-hop film Junction 48.

In 2009, Moverman made his directorial feature film debut with The Messenger, starring Ben Foster and Woody Harrelson. The film had its world premiere at the 2009 Sundance Film Festival.

Co-written with Alessandro Camon The Messenger won the Silver Bear for best screenplay and the Peace Film Award at the Berlin International Film Festival, as well as the Grand Prize and the International Critics Prize at the Deauville Film Festival. It was nominated in the Best Original Screenplay and Best Supporting Actor categories by the Academy of Motion Picture Arts and Sciences.

In 2011, Moverman collaborated with Harrelson again in his second directorial film Rampart. The film had its world premiere at the 2011 Toronto International Film Festival.

In 2014, he directed Time Out of Mind, starring Richard Gere. The film had its world premiere at the 2014 Toronto International Film Festival where it won the Fipresci Prize, an award given by the International Federation of Film Critics.

In 2017, he directed The Dinner, starring Gere, Steve Coogan, Laura Linney, and Rebecca Hall. The film had its world premiere at the 67th Berlin International Film Festival.

Moverman also directed the Willie Nelson documentary series Willie Nelson & Family. The five-part show premiered at the 2023 Sundance Film Festival. The four-part version, Executive Produced by Taylor Sheridan, premiered in December 2023 and was nominated for the 2024 Outstanding Arts & Culture Documentary Emmy.

== Filmography ==
=== Feature films ===
Year	Title	Director	Writer	Producer
1999	Jesus' Son	No	Yes	No
2002	Face	No	Yes	No
2007	I'm Not There	No	Yes	No
2007	Married Life	No	Yes	No
2009	The Messenger	Yes	Yes	No
2011	Rampart	Yes	Yes	No
2014	Time Out of Mind	Yes	Yes	No
2014	The Quiet Ones	No	Yes	No
2014	She's Lost Control	No	No	Yes
2014	Love & Mercy	No	Yes	Yes
2016	Junction 48	No	Yes	Yes
2016	Norman	No	No	Yes
2016	The Ticket	No	No	Yes
2017	Verónica	No	No	Yes
2017	The Dinner	Yes	Yes	No
2018	Monsters and Men	No	No	Yes
2018	Diane	No	No	Yes
2018	Puzzle	No	Yes	No
2018	Skin	No	No	Yes
2018	The Tale	No	No	Yes
2018	Wildlife	No	No	Yes
2019	Bad Education	No	No	Yes
2019	Human Capital	No	Yes	Yes
2020	Bad Hair	No	No	Yes
2021	Passing	No	No	Yes
2021	Why is We Americans?	No	No	Yes
2022	The Listener	No	No	Yes
2022	June Zero	No	No	Yes
2023	A Thousand and One	No	No	Yes
2023	Willie Nelson & Family	Yes	No	Yes
2024	The American Society of Magical Negroes	No	No	Yes
2024	Longing	No	No	Yes
2024	Wisdom of Happiness	No	No	Yes
2025	Köln 75	No	No	Yes
2025	Rental Family	No	No	Yes
2026	The Liberation	No	No	Yes
2026	Borges and Me	No	Yes	Yes

== See also ==
- List of Israeli Academy Award winners and nominees
- List of Jewish Academy Award winners and nominees
