= Eyes in the Dark =

- Promotional poster
- Directed by: Bjorn Anderson
- Written by: Bjorn Anderson
- Produced by: Bjorn Anderson
- Starring: Wayne Bastrup; Melissa Goad; Maureen Francisco; Paul Eenhoorn
- Cinematography: Joseph Cole
- Edited by: Robyn Scaringi
- Music by: S.Y.F.T.
- Production company: Emerald City Pictures
- Release date: April 25, 2010 (Alabama Film Festival)
- Running time: 78 minutes
- Country: United States
- Language: English

Eyes in the Dark is a 2010 American horror film written and directed by Bjorn Anderson. It is filmed in the "found footage" style.

== Plot ==
The movie follows seven college students as they take a weekend trip to a lodge in the Cascade Mountains. As they film themselves for their video blog, they record some strange occurrences. The students and the lodge's caretaker come across a mysterious cave with unusual markings. They soon become hunted by an unknown creature with glowing red eyes.

== Cast ==
- Wayne Bastrup as Josh Adams
- Melissa Goad as Lacy Meyers
- John Symonds as Dean McClaren
- Maureen Francisco as Heather Conroy
- Telisa Steen as Stephanie Miller
- Melinda Ausserer as Allison Stevens
- Jason Robison as John Smith
- Paul Eenhoorn as Anders
- Ernie Joseph as Dr. Steven Monteray
- Charlie Sims as Dr. Wesley Mason

== Production ==
Director Bjorn Anderson developed the idea for the film after having a nightmare. He cited Cloverfield and The Blair Witch Project as influences on his decision to shoot the film in a similar first-person, found-footage style.

In 2007, while completing Warrior's End, Anderson pitched Eyes in the Dark to producers Joseph Cole and Mike Ash. Principal photography took place during the summer of 2008, with additional scenes filmed later.

== Release ==
The film had its world premiere on April 25, 2010 at the Alabama International Film Festival. In 2010, it was also an official selection for Seattle's True Independent Film Festival, Fright Night Film Fest, Local Sightings, and Killer Film Fest. The movie was released on DVD through Amazon.com on March 21, 2011.

== Reception ==
Viewings of the trailer for Eyes in the Dark created curiosity for what the red eyes are. After attending an early, private screening, movie reviewer Jeff Walls said that he "enjoyed the film" and it "was edited together really well." Just before the DVD release, Reviewer Hal C. F. Astell describes the movie as "astounding" in comparison to big budget movies like Avatar. He goes on to say, "it's refreshing to see such a carefully crafted micro-budget film." Review by Adrian Halen "Shot hand-held in first-person POV style, Eyes in the Dark is an independent film that follows a group of college co-eds on a weekend cabin getaway in the Washington State Cascade foothills. Brought to you by the filmmaking team behind Warrior’s End, Eyes in the Dark combines the characters’ compulsive self-documentation and laid-back humor with the raw terror they uncover after crossing paths with an ancient evil. The filmmakers blended the improvisational talents of the actors with beautiful but brooding locations to create a vision that plays on the fear of the unknown. Set in a fictionalized area of the Cascade Range with a long history of legends and mysterious disappearances, the film quickly transports the audience to a place of excitement and terror."
