= Paul Eenhoorn =

Australian actor (1948–2022)

- Born: 16 November 1948; Australia
- Died: 1 August 2022 (aged 73); Tacoma, Washington, U.S.
- Occupation: Actor
- Years active: 1965–2022
- Spouse: Stephanie Eenhoorn

Paul Eenhoorn (16 November 1948 – 1 August 2022) was an Australian actor best known for his late-career work in American independent films.

== Early life ==
Eenhoorn was born in Australia on 16 November 1948. He had a brother named Makk and a sister named Heather. He attended Paul Blackburn South High School and Murdoch University in Perth, then studied acting at the Western Australian Academy of Performing Arts in the Mount Lawley suburb of Perth and at The Actors Center in Sydney.

== Career ==
While studying acting in Sydney, Eenhoorn met and began dating an American woman named Stephanie; they later married and moved to the U.S. together in 1999, when he was 51 years old. They settled in Seattle, Washington, where he grew to be a well-respected actor in the local film community. It is not known exactly when he made his acting debut, though he said in a 2013 interview, "I've been on television since I was about 17. I had opportunities, one major opportunity I blew in my 20s. Once I started down this pathway, it was a case of not letting anyone stop me. Not my wife, not my family. It was getting too late to give it a small percentage. I had to give it one hundred percent."

Eenhoorn played the villainous Mr. Daniels in the family comedy film Max Rules (2004), which was voted by audiences as the top American film at that year's Seattle International Film Festival (SIFF). He starred in the short film Elliot's Wake (2007), an official selection of that year's SIFF. He played a detective in re-enactment segments of the controversial documentary Zoo (2007), about the Enumclaw horse sex case, which played at the 2007 Sundance and Cannes festivals. He received critical acclaim for his leading role in the medieval epic film Warrior's End (2009), which was given the Mt. Rainier Award at that year's Seattle's True Independent Film Festival (STIFF). At the same festival, he was also seen in the short thriller film Chemistry, which won Best On Screen Chemistry. Outside of films, he provided the face model for Arne Magnusson in the video game Half-Life 2: Episode Two (2007). In what is perhaps his most widely known role, he starred in the drama film This Is Martin Bonner (2013).

== Personal life ==
Eenhoorn and his wife Stephanie had a daughter named Natasha, through whom they had a granddaughter named Miranda.

== Death ==
On 1 August 2022, at the age of 73, Eenhoorn died of a heart attack whilst asleep at his home in Tacoma, Washington. His death was confirmed by his wife.

Filmmaker Chad Hartigan, who directed Eenhoorn in This Is Martin Bonner (2013), tweeted that he was "devastated" to hear about Eenhoorn's death and further wrote, "He put his heart and soul into his role in This Is Martin Bonner and it leapt out of the screen and is the only reason I have a career now. That his break came so late in life is a huge loss for all the work we never got to see him do."
