= Gerri Russell =

American romantic fiction author

- Born: Geraldine Garding; Ogden, Utah
- Occupation: Author, novelist
- Education: Bachelor of Arts in journalism
- Alma mater: Seattle University, Seattle, Washington
- Genre: historical romantic fiction
- Notable awards: Romance Writers of America Golden Heart Awards(2); Romantic Times BOOK Reviews and Dorchester Publishing’s American Title II Contest Winner

Website
- gerrirussell.net

Gerri Russell is an American romantic fiction author, currently residing in the Pacific Northwest with her family.

== Writing career and awards ==
Before publishing her first novel, Russell's career started in a variety of writing fields, beginning as a newspaper columnist in college. Upon graduation, she worked as a broadcast journalist, newspaper reporter, magazine columnist, technical writer and editor and instructional designer.

Russell's first award was the Romance Writers of America Golden Heart in 1998 for her paranormal romance, Remember Me. She won another Golden Heart in 2002 in the short historical category with The Warrior Trainer. The same book won the American Title II contest, sponsored by Romantic Times Bookreviews magazine and Dorchester Publishing in 2006. Russell began writing when her daughter was three years old. Prior to selling The Warrior Trainer to Dorchester Publishing, Russell wrote seven novels, several partials and sought publication for thirteen years.

For the November 2009 issue of RT Book Reviews Magazine (issue #309), Russell interviewed Diana Gabaldon about her seventh book in the Outlander series, An Echo in the Bone.

== Personal life and interests ==
A history buff from a young age, Russell's novels are based on real-life historic people from the early 14th century. Her goal is to not leave footprints on history while writing. Russell's fascination with history extended to her spare time where she often worked for one weekend each summer as a living history re-enactor at the Shrewsbury Reinaissance Faire in Kings Valley, Oregon.

== The Warrior Trainer ==
Scotia, the heroine in Russell's first novel, The Warrior Trainer, is based on a real-life female from Scotland's history. Russell first learned of Scotia while at a demonstration by the Seattle Knights. Her research involved finding a first source reference that linked Scotia to Scotland's past. Russell discovered evidence of Scotia's existence in a book detailing the lineage of Scottish kings.

The Warrior Trainer was initially rejected by several publishers for having a main female character who was considered too strong.

== Bibliography ==
=== Scottish Stones of Destiny Series ===
- The Warrior Trainer, 2007, re-released 2015
- Warrior's Bride, 2007, re-released 2015
- Warrior's Lady, 2008, re-released 2015

=== Brotherhood of the Scottish Templars Series ===
- To Tempt a Knight, 2009, re-released 2014
- Seducing the Knight, 2010, re-released 2014
- A Knight to Desire, 2012
- Border Lord's Bride, 2014

=== Highland Bachelor Series ===
- A Laird for Christmas, 2013
- This Laird of Mine, 2013

=== Contemporary Titles ===
- Flirting with Felicity, 2015
- Married at Midnight, 2016
