= Robert Burke =

Robert Burke may refer to:

- Robert Burke (director) (born 1984), American film director
- Robert John Burke (born 1960), American actor who starred in Robocop 3
- Robert C. Burke (1949–1968), Medal of Honor recipient and United States Marine, killed in action in Vietnam
- Robert Malachy Burke (1907–1998), Irish Christian socialist and philanthropist
- Robert E. Burke (1847–1901), U.S. Representative from Texas
- Robert O'Hara Burke (1821–1861), Australian explorer
- Robert Burke, in list of characters in Jurassic Park
- Robert Burke, Columbia University student expelled in 1936 for anti-Nazi protest
- Robert H. Burke (1922–2003), American politician in California
- Robert P. Burke (born 1962), United States Navy admiral
- Robert Easton (actor) (Robert Burke, 1930–2011), American actor

== See also ==
- Robert Bourke, 1st Baron Connemara (1827–1902), British Conservative politician and colonial administrator
