= Joseph Cole (cinematographer) =

American cinematographer and producer

- Born: United States
- Occupations: Cinematographer, film producer
- Years active: 2000–present
- Website: compactreality.com

Joseph Cole is an American cinematographer and film producer. He was raised on Mercer Island, where he met his lifelong friend and collaborator, Bjorn Anderson. Soon after Joseph had graduated from the New York Film Academy, Bjorn had pitched the idea for their first feature film together, Warrior's End which was named 40th on Looper.com's "80 Best Medieval Movies of All Time Ranked". They worked together again on the horror movie, Eyes in the Dark.
