= Melissa Goad =

American actress

- Born: July 10, 1982 (age 43); Seattle, Washington, United States
- Occupation: actress
- Years active: 2006–present
- Website: http://www.melissagoad.com/

Melissa Goad (born July 10, 1982) is an actress and model, mostly known for independent dramas and horror movies.

== Early life ==
Melissa-Rae Annette Goad was born July 10, 1982, in Seattle, Washington and grew up in nearby Kent. She was entered in a beauty pageant by her mother at the age of 5, which inspired her to become an actor. She participated in her school's drama programs as she grew up. She continued her studies at the American Academy of Dramatic Arts in Hollywood and graduated in 2005.

== Career ==
Goad was on the reality show, Live Like a Star on Fox. She also had a starring role in the movie Real Witches: An Intimate Portrait on Lifetime. When Goad auditioned for the lead for the internet series, The Bicyclist, the creator wrote a part specifically for Goad to be on the series. Goad starred in, produced and edited the drama Shaniko, which was an award-winning selection for the Washougal International Film Festival. Goad by herself opens the dark and disturbing slasher flick, The Taken. The film was an official selection for Seattle's True Independent Film Festival and awarded Best Slasher Effects. Goad is one of the founding members of The World Bikini Football League. She starred in Eyes in the Dark with fellow TWBFL founder, Maureen Francisco. Goad is now living in Southern California hoping to start a new team for Bikini Football.
