= Bernward Koch =

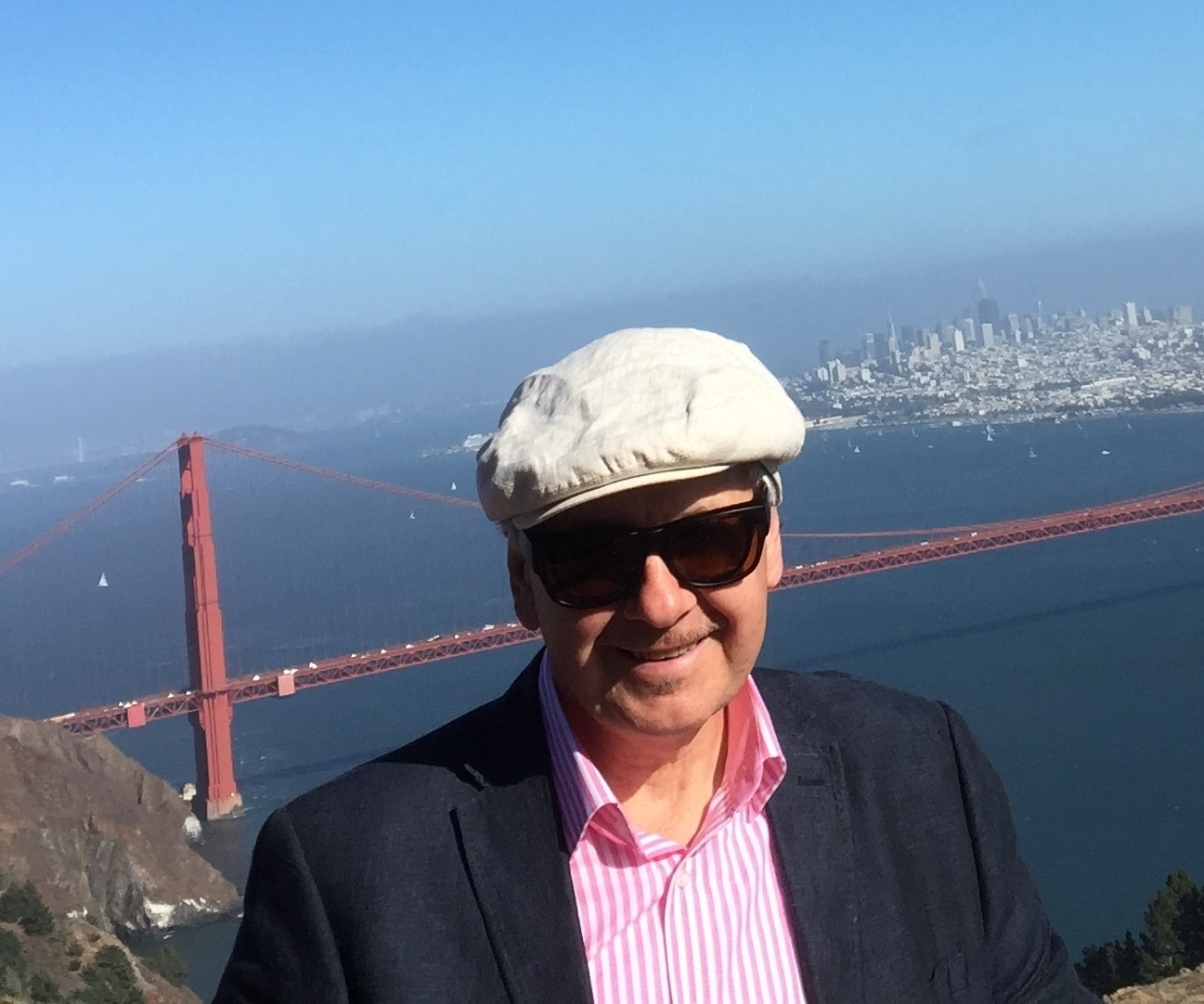
- Bernward Koch (2017)

Background information
- Born: January 23, 1957 (age 69)
- Origin: Germany
- Instruments: Piano, Keyboards, Percussion, Guitar, Bass, Drums

Bernward Koch (born January 23, 1957, in Siegen) is a German composer, pianist and keyboardist. Additionally, he plays percussion, bass, and guitar. His music mainly evokes a soothing and calming style, with a clearly recognizable melody from the piano, enriched with keyboards, flute, guitar and percussion. His first release, 1989's Flowing, was successful especially in the United States, hit song: "Ever Returning".

The second album Laguna de la Vera achieved top positions on the Billboard New Age Chart. Kochs tracks contributed to several US-Aids-benefit compilations among others together with Sting, Bonnie Raitt, Al Jarreau, Ottmar Liebert, Dave Grusin, Dave Stewart. The song "Touched by Love" from the Walking through Clouds album appears on a compilation in Belgium/Luxembourg Universal Music Group together with Ennio Morricone, Tony Bennett and Lang Lang.

The Weber State University in Ogden, Utah recommends his music as anti stress. Many airlines around the world apply his "music against fear of flying". The track "Childhood Hour", a piece from his record Walking through Clouds, was used in the award-winning movie “Shaniko” with Melissa Goad in 2008. All of his US releases were released by the Californian label Real Music (based in Sausalito near San Francisco). Since 2019 the label, including all previous albums and album Becoming, has been taken over by the new label myndstream (Beverly Hills / LA).

The album Montagnola was recorded as a piano solo improvisation and is dedicated to the German Swiss writer Hermann Hesse. Koch has earned such awards as Piano Heaven Award in England and Audiophiles Highlight Award from STEREO in Germany. In 2012 he won the cultural prize from his hometown Wenden. Koch has published fourteen albums so far, the current release is called Becoming (myndstream, Real Music, USA). Since 2016 Koch is an official member of The Recording Academy (National Academy of Recording Arts and Sciences, NARAS) and thereby a Grammy Award voting member.

== Discography ==
=== Studio albums ===
- 1989 - FLOWING
- 1992 - LAGUNA DE LA VERA
- 1995 - STILL MAGIC
- 1997 - PICANTE (featuring Pablo/Brothers)
- 1997 - FLOWING (new US-release by Real Music)
- 1999 - JOURNEY TO THE HEART
- 2005 - WALKING THROUGH CLOUDS
- 2008 - MONTAGNOLA (Dedicated to Hermann Hesse)
- 2009 - GENTLE SPIRIT
- 2011 - SILENT STAR
- 2013 - DAY OF LIFE
- 2015 - REMEMBERING
- 2016 - TOUCHED BY LOVE - A COLLECTION
- 2017 - FILLED WITH LIGHT
- 2020 - BECOMING (myndstream, USA)
- 2022 - TREE TALES (Tree Tales Records/A-Train, USA)
- 2024 - CALMING COLORS (Tree Tales Records/A-Train, USA)
- 2026 - BEHIND THE HILLS (Tree Tales Records/A-Train, USA)

=== Singles ===
- 2021 - FLOWING COLORS (May 7, 2021)
- 2021 - LONELY DREAM (June 18, 2021)
- 2021 - LONELY DREAM - SOLO PIANO (July 2, 2021)
- 2021 - THE WINDING PATH (July 30, 2021)
- 2021 - SILENT LEAVES (August 31, 2021)
- 2021 - AN OLD FAIRY TALE (November 19, 2021)

=== Other album appearances ===
- 1990 - THE WAVE 94.7 KTWV - WAVE AID 4
- 1990 - KKSF 103.7 FM - SAMPLER FOR AIDS RELIEF 3
- 1997 - ETERNITY: A ROMANTIC COLLECTION I + II
- 1997 - TRANQUILITY
- 1997 - PIANO DREAMERS
- 2002 - SACRED SPA MUSIC SERIES
- 2005 - REAL PIANO
- 2006 - INSPARATION
- 2009 - SACRED SPA MUSIC SERIES 2
- 2014 - NAMASTE - HEALING
- 2015 - ANGELS OF HOPE
- 2016 - FOREST BATHING

== Sheet Music ==
- Walking through Clouds (track)
- Wonderful Glider

== Music in Movie ==
- Shaniko (2008) including Childhood Hour (track)
