= Wayne Bastrup =

American actor and musician

- Born: January 20, 1976 (age 50); Port Townsend, Washington
- Occupations: Actor, musician
- Years active: 2003–present
- Website: waynebastrup.com

Wayne Bastrup (born January 20, 1976) is an American actor and musician. He is known for portraying the younger version of Oscar winner J. K. Simmons' character Detective O'Brien in the fifth installment of the Terminator film franchise, Terminator Genisys. Bastrup also appears in the critically acclaimed 2014 American biographical film Love and Mercy, directed by Bill Pohlad, about musician and songwriter Brian Wilson of The Beach Boys. He has performed as a guest-star on numerous television shows, including The Mentalist, CSI: NY, Leverage, Awake, Whitney, Angie Tribeca, L.A.'s Finest and Truth Be Told.

In October 2015, it was announced that Bastrup was joining the cast of Sully, an upcoming American biographical drama film directed by Clint Eastwood, based on the autobiography Highest Duty by Chesley "Sully" Sullenberger.

Bastrup is also the drummer for the Seattle-based band Gunbunny. His drumming style has been described as "driving" and "textured," with a live performance review noting his capabilities as "stellar." He was born January 20, 1976, in Port Townsend, Washington, USA. He earned a master's degree in Architecture from the University of Washington in 2002.

== Filmography ==
Year	Title	Role	Notes
2006	June and July	Rusty	
2008	Special	Chris	
2009	World's Greatest Dad	TV Crew Member	Uncredited
2009	Warrior's End	Captain Krais	
2010	Eyes in the Dark	Josh Adams	
2011	Minds, Adolescents	Scott	
2011	L.A.G.P.	Sam	
2011	Cowboys & Indians	Conway	
2014	Love & Mercy	Process Server	
2015	Terminator Genisys	Young O'Brien	
2015	Radio America	Donny	
2016	Sully	Brian Kelly	
