= This Is Martin Bonner =

2013 film by Chad Hartigan

- Film poster
- Directed by: Chad Hartigan
- Written by: Chad Hartigan
- Produced by: Cherie Saulter
- Starring: Paul Eenhoorn; Richmond Arquette; Sam Buchanan; Robert Longstreet; Demetrius Grosse
- Cinematography: Sean McElwee
- Edited by: Julio C. Perez IV
- Music by: Keegan DeWitt
- Production companies: 600 West Productions; Stay Glorious
- Distributed by: Monterey Media
- Release dates: January 20, 2013 (Sundance); August 14, 2013 (United States)
- Running time: 83 minutes
- Country: United States
- Language: English
- Budget: $42,000
- Box office: $13,888

This Is Martin Bonner is a 2013 American drama film written and directed by Chad Hartigan. It stars Paul Eenhoorn in the title role, with Richmond Arquette, Sam Buchanan, Robert Longstreet, and Demetrius Grosse in supporting roles. It revolves around a middle-aged divorced man who leaves his old life behind and relocates to Reno, Nevada, where he strikes up an unlikely friendship with a recently released ex-convict.

The film had its world premiere at the Sundance Film Festival on January 20, 2013, where it won the Best of NEXT Audience Award. It was given a limited theatrical release in the United States on August 14, 2013, by Monterey Media. It received positive reviews from critics, and won the John Cassavetes Award at the 29th Independent Spirit Awards.

== Plot ==
Martin Bonner has just moved to Nevada from Maryland, leaving behind his two adult children and a life he spent more than two decades building. He is there working at a new job as the volunteer coordinator for a non-profit organization that helps prisoners make the transition from incarceration to freedom. This is Martin’s first job in two years and he has recently declared bankruptcy.

At the same time, Travis Holloway, a prisoner in the program, is being released after serving twelve years. Sent back into the world with nothing, Travis also finds life in Reno difficult to adjust to, despite the help from his program sponsor, Steve Helms.

The stories of Martin and Travis slowly converge, as these two meet and find that they have much in common, not the least of which is an unspoken need for encouragement and support. Their unlikely friendship blossoms but is put to the test when Travis betrays Martin's trust in order to reunite with his estranged daughter.

== Cast ==
- Paul Eenhoorn as Martin Bonner
- Richmond Arquette as Travis Holloway
- Sam Buchanan as Diana Holloway
- Demetrius Grosse as Locy
- Kristin Slaysman as April
- Robert Longstreet as Steve Helms
- Jan Haley as Angela Helms

== Production ==
This Is Martin Bonner was loosely inspired by the experiences of Chad Hartigan's father, who had to move to a new state for a job. The film was produced by Cherie Saulter for 600 West Productions in association with Stay Glorious, while Nick Cucinella served as an executive producer. It was shot on location in the Nevada cities of Reno and Sparks, the latter being the hometown of Hartigan's mother. The Red One camera was used for the shoot, which took 16 days in November 2011.

== Release ==
This Is Martin Bonner premiered at the 2013 Sundance Film Festival, where it won the Audience Award for Best of NEXT. Throughout the year, it screened at the Oxford Film Festival, the Florida Film Festival, the Nashville Film Festival, the Maryland Film Festival, the Wisconsin Film Festival, and the River Run Film Festival. At the Sarasota Film Festival, it won the On Golden Pond Award for Artistic Accomplishment.

In February 2013, Monterey Media acquired U.S. distribution rights to the film. It was theatrically released in New York City on August 14, 2013, and in Los Angeles on August 16, followed by a VOD release on August 20.

== Reception ==
=== Critical response ===
On the review aggregator website Rotten Tomatoes, 97% of 29 critics' reviews are positive, with an average rating of 8.0/10. The website's consensus reads: "Solemn but heartfelt, This Is Martin Bonner is a slow-burning drama with an outstanding performance by Paul Eenhoorn as the title character." Metacritic, which uses a weighted average, assigned the film a score of 71 out of 100, based on 10 critics, indicating "generally favorable" reviews.

John Anderson of Variety stated, "This Is Martin Bonner isn't long on narrative, but the performances by Eerhoorn, Arquette and Buchanan are wonderfully internalized, and the tone is of the piece is both consistent and convincing." David Rooney of The Hollywood Reporter called the film "a somber, slow-moving drama built out of small but acutely observed moments of naturalistic human behavior." Nicolas Rapold of The New York Times remarked, "It's gratifying to see the care taken with his characters, though it would be no betrayal of them for Mr. Hartigan to flesh out their world and their lives further." Robert Abele of the Los Angeles Times opined, "This Is Martin Bonner, wonderfully acted and something of a minimalist masterpiece, is a striking, moving ode to lives lived day to day, even hour to hour, in which the smallest gesture has the power to make one hopeful for the next, like a small fire gently stoked." Amy R. Handler of Film Threat commented, "What's interesting, and key about Hartigan's film, is that its extreme strength lies in its minimalism and fine details." Jordan Cronk of Slant Magazine gave the film 3 out of 4 stars and wrote, "Austere but not cold, serene yet never dull, moving without resorting to dramatic histrionics, This Is Martin Bonner is instead something altogether different."

=== Accolades ===
The film was given the Audience Award: Best of NEXT at the 2013 Sundance Film Festival. It also won the John Cassavetes Award (for best feature made under $500,000) at the 29th Independent Spirit Awards.
