= Morris from America =

2016 film by Chad Hartigan

- Theatrical release poster
- Directed by: Chad Hartigan
- Written by: Chad Hartigan
- Produced by: Martin Heisler; Sara Murphy; Adele Romanski; Gabriele Simon
- Starring: Craig Robinson; Markees Christmas; Carla Juri; Lina Keller; Jakub Gierszał
- Cinematography: Sean McElwee
- Edited by: Anne Fabini
- Music by: Keegan DeWitt
- Production companies: Lichtblick Media; Beachside Films; Indi Film; SWR
- Distributed by: A24; DirecTV Cinema
- Release dates: January 22, 2016 (Sundance); August 19, 2016 (United States)
- Running time: 91 minutes
- Countries: United States; Germany
- Languages: English; German
- Box office: $91,181

Morris from America is a 2016 coming-of-age comedy-drama film written and directed by Chad Hartigan, produced by Martin Heisler, Sara Murphy, Adele Romanski, and Gabriele Simon, and starring Craig Robinson, Markees Christmas, Carla Juri, Lina Keller, and Jakub Gierszał. The film follows a 13-year-old American boy who dreams of becoming a rapper in an EDM-dominated Germany.

It was shown in the U.S. Dramatic Competition section at the 2016 Sundance Film Festival, where Hartigan won the Waldo Salt Screenwriting Award. The film was released on July 7, 2016, through DirecTV Cinema prior to opening in a limited release on August 19, 2016, by A24.

== Plot ==
A coming-of-age adventure story of a 13-year-old American boy Morris who is currently living in Germany with his father Curtis, a soccer coach. Mo faces rejection from his peer group, finds himself impinged on boundaries of trust with his language tutor, romantic infatuation and drug use, finds niche in his rapping skills, learns to accept unexpected and odd experiences without taxing himself. His father also struggles to fit in with German culture and tries to be a stand up man for his son while grieving for his recently dead wife. He does what can be done best at the given time for making a better environment for Mo to grow up.

== Cast ==
- Craig Robinson as Curtis Gentry
- Markees Christmas as Morris "Mo" Gentry
- Carla Juri as Inka
- Lina Keller as Katrin
- Jakub Gierszał as Per
- Levin Henning as Bastian
- Leon Badenhop as Rainer
- Marie Loschhorn as Birgit
- Patrick Güldenberg as Sven
- Josephine Becker as Nadine
- Eva Löbau as Katrin's Mother

== Production ==
In July 2015, it was announced that Chad Hartigan would be directing a film from a screenplay he wrote. It was also announced that Craig Robinson, Carla Juri, and Markees Christmas, Lina Keller, Jakub Gierszal, Eva Löbau and Levin Henning had all been cast in the film, with Christmas portraying the role of an American boy moving to Germany, with Robinson portraying his father, and Juri portraying the role of his tutor. It was also announced that Lichtblick Media GMBH and Beachside Films would be co-producing the film, which is being produced by Sara Murphy, Adele Romanski, Martin Heisler and Gabriele Simon, executive producing are Michael B. Clark and Alex Turtletaub.

== Release ==
The film had its world premiere at the 2016 Sundance Film Festival on January 22, 2016. Shortly after, A24 acquired U.S distribution rights to the film. The film was released on DirecTV Cinema on July 7, 2016, prior to opening in a limited release on August 19, 2016.

== Reception ==
=== Critical response ===
Morris From America received positive reviews from film critics. It holds an 87% rating on review aggregator website Rotten Tomatoes, based on 87 reviews, with an average rating of 7.1/10. The site's consensus reads, "Morris from America adds some novel narrative twists to its father-son story -- and gains added resonance thanks to a powerful performance from Craig Robinson." On Metacritic the film has a score of 75 out of 100 score, based on 29 critics, indicating "generally favorable reviews".

Justin Chang of Variety gave the film a positive review writing "Set to the pulsing hip-hop music that fuels Morris' dreams and offers him refuge in a place that can seem friendly and threatening by turns, this coming-of-age dramedy explores how the challenges of being young, black and misunderstood can be compounded in a foreign environment, but goes about it in a grounded, character-driven way that never smacks of manipulation or special pleading." Eric Kohn of Indiewire gave the film a B+ writing : "Morris From America excels at conveying the inherent power of companionship in a largely indifferent world. When Curtis asserts that he and his son are 'the only two brothers in Heidelberg,' it's the movie's coziest moment."

=== Accolades ===
| Award | Category | Recipient(s) | Result | Ref(s) |
|---|---|---|---|---|
| Black Reel Awards | Outstanding Breakthrough Performance, Male | Markees Christmas | Nominated | |
| Black Reel Awards | Outstanding Independent Film | Morris from America | Nominated | |
| Cleveland International Film Festival | Best American Independent Feature Film | Chad Hartigan | Nominated | |
| Gotham Awards | Best Actor | Craig Robinson | Nominated | |
| Independent Spirit Awards | Best Supporting Male | Craig Robinson | Nominated | |
| Seattle International Film Festival | Futurewave Youth Jury Award | Chad Hartigan | Nominated | |
| Sundance Film Festival | Special Jury Prize | Craig Robinson | Won | |
| Sundance Film Festival | Waldo Salt Screenwriting Award | Chad Hartigan | Won | |
| Sundance Film Festival | Grand Jury Prize | Chad Hartigan | Nominated | |
