= Demetrius Grosse =

American actor

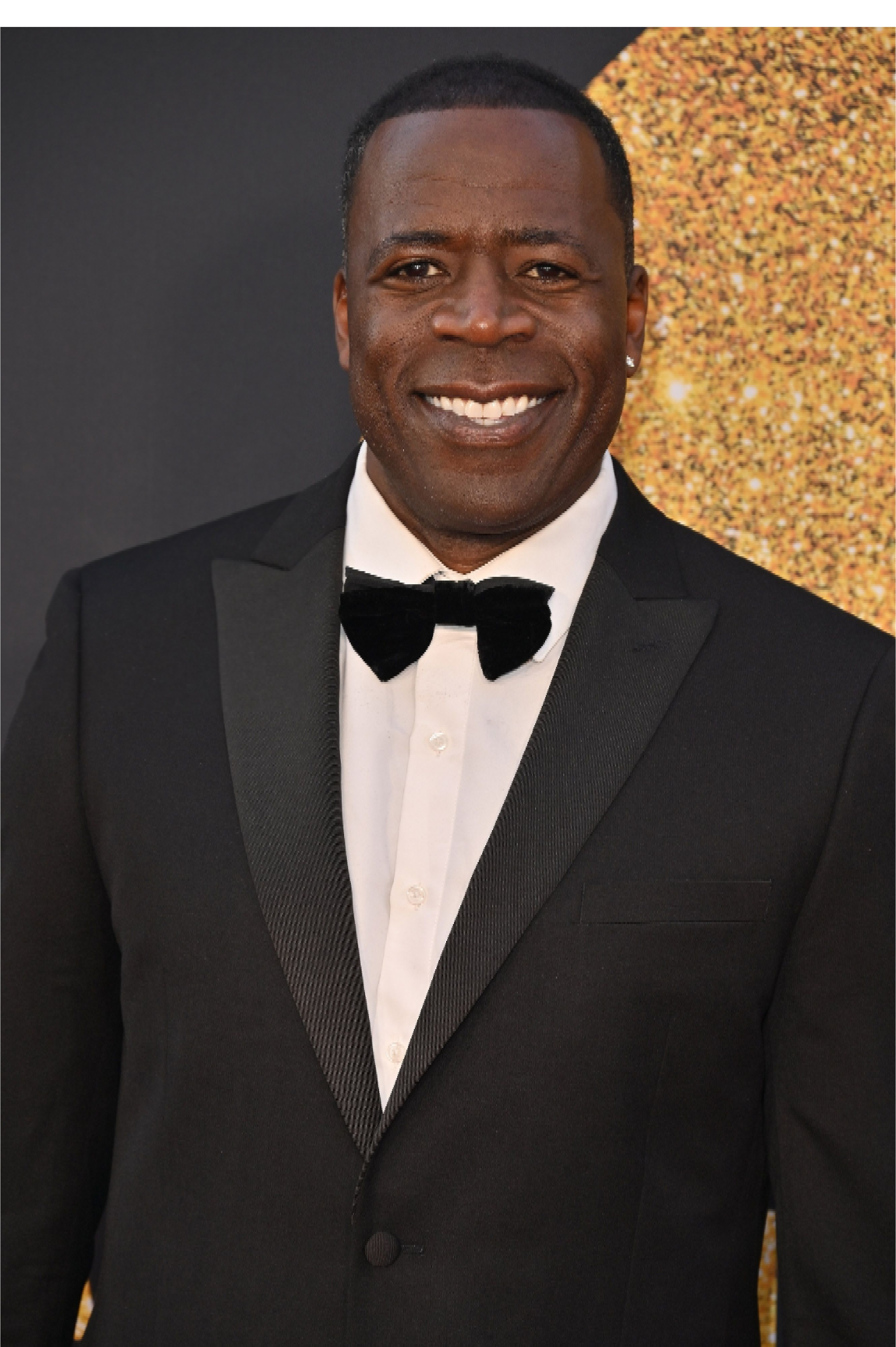
- Born: February 26, 1981 (age 45); Washington, D.C., U.S.
- Education: Carnegie Mellon University (BFA)
- Occupation: Actor
- Years active: 2005–present

Demetrius Grosse (born February 26, 1981) is an American actor. He is best known for his roles as Rock in the film Straight Outta Compton, Emmett Yawners in the Cinemax television series Banshee, Errol in the FX television series Justified, and Baron Samedi in NBC's Heroes.

He joined the Marvel Cinematic Universe as Eric Williams in the Disney+ series Wonder Man.

== Early life ==
Born in Washington, D.C., Grosse began performing in stage productions as a child at the Summer Musical Theater Workshop, developing a repertoire as an actor, singer, and dancer. Early in his career, Grosse cut hair at Legends, a well-known Los Angeles barber shop. After graduating from Washington's Gonzaga College High School, Grosse attended the Carnegie Mellon University School of Drama, where he received the prestigious Andrew Carnegie Undergraduate Grant for artistic merit. In 2002, Grosse completed a visiting student program in which he completed two semesters of intensive study at the Howard University College of Fine Arts in his home city of Washington DC.

== Career ==
Grosse appeared in the HBO series Westworld based on the 1973 film of the same name. He also appeared in Michael Bay's feature film 13 Hours: The Secret Soldiers of Benghazi (2016). Grosse is known for taking on many characters from various backgrounds and from all different genres. He made his acting debut in Numbers (2005) and is well known for his roles in Straight Outta Compton (2015), Saving Mr. Banks (2013), This Is Martin Bonner (2013), and Banshee (2013). His other television credits include Justified, Criminal Minds, ER, NCIS, Heroes, Bones, Dexter, CSI: Miami, and Frontier. Grosse also made appearances in The Inheritance (2011) and Hollywood (2011). Grosse has credits for producing Last Cry for Katrina (2013), Moonshiners, and A Quiet Fire (2009).

=== Banshee ===
On Banshee, Grosse portrayed series regular character Deputy Emmett Yawners for the first two seasons.

=== Justified ===
On Justified, Grosse portrayed recurring character Errol Butler who is Ellstin Limehouse's right-hand man in Noble's Holler.

=== Heroes ===
On Heroes, Grosse portrayed recurring character Baron Samedi.

=== The Rookie ===
On The Rookie, Grosse portrayed Detective Kevin Wolfe, a recurring guest character.

=== Allegations and investigation ===
In 2019, The Rookie became the subject of public controversy when actress Afton Williamson, a series regular during its first season, alleged that she had experienced racial discrimination and sexual harassment while working on the show. Among her claims, Williamson accused guest star Demetrius Grosse of harassment and another crew member of sexual assault during a wrap party.

Williamson claimed that she had gone to the showrunners multiple times with these allegations, but was ignored.

All involved in the allegations denied them. An investigation was commissioned through the law firm Mitchell Silberberg & Knupp along with a third-party firm, EXTTI, which conducted nearly 400 hours of interviews and examined video and other evidence. The results of the investigation were published on September 17, 2019, which found that the allegations made by Williamson had no merit, and could not be proven. Williamson stood by her claims, calling the results of the investigation "heartbreaking" and postulated that the producers had lied to cover up the truth of what happened.

Grosse has not appeared on The Rookie since.

== Filmography ==
=== Film ===
Year	Title	Role	Notes
2006	Sofia For Now	Postal Clerk	
2007	Studio	Mr. Banks	
2009	A Quiet Fire	The Stranger/David	Winner of the Sirrocco Award at the AOF Film Festival. AOF nomination for Best Supporting Actor in a Short Film
2010	Cartel War	Eric Carter	
2011	The Inheritance	Ancestor Henry	
2011	Slice	Detective Love	
2011	Hollywoo	Gangsta	
2013	This Is Martin Bonner	Locy	
2013	Battle of the Year	Scott	
2013	Saving Mr. Banks	Bartender	
2014	Never a Neverland	Narrator	
2014	Counter	Bayard Rustin	
2015	Samaria	Bug	2015 Student Academy Award Nomination (Short Film)
2015	Straight Outta Compton	Rock	
2016	13 Hours: The Secret Soldiers of Benghazi	DS Agent Dave Ubben	
2018	Rampage	Colonel Blake	
2018	Love Jacked	Mtumbie	
2020	Body Cam	Gary	
2022	Strong Enough	Shane	Short film
2024	Sound of Hope: The Story of Possum Trot	Reverend W.C. Martin	

=== Television ===
Year	Title	Role	Notes
2005	Numb3rs	US Marshal	2 episodes
2005	Close to Home	Public Defender	Episode: "The Rapist Next Door"
2006	The Unit	Guard #1	Episode: "Force Majeure"
2006	Dexter	Alex Timmons	2 episodes
2007	Dirt	Kenny the Assistant	2 episodes
2007	CSI: Miami	Chuck Greene	Episode: "A Grizzle Murder"
2007	NCIS	Atif Nukunda	Episode: "Designated Target"
2008	Bones	Tucker Payne	Episode: "The Finger in the Nest”
2008	Heroes	Baron Samedi	Recurring role (season 3); 3 episodes
2008–2009	ER	Officer Newkirk	Recurring role (seasons 14–15); 5 episodes
2010	House M.D.	Hacinte	Episode: "A Pox on Our House"
2011	The Cape	Marty's Guard	Episode: "Endgame"
2011	Criminal Minds: Suspect Behavior	Barry Vernon / Lieutenant Beasley	2 episodes
2011	How to Be a Gentleman	Officer Sims	Episode: "How to Have a One-Night Stand 2"
2011	Shameless	Eddie Murphy	Episode: "Uncle Carl"
2012, 2015	Justified	Errol	Recurring role (season 3); Guest role (season 6); 13 episodes
2013–2014	Banshee	Deputy Emmett Yawners	Main cast (season 1–2); 16 episodes
2015	Complications	Dan Brennan	Episode: "Pilot"
2016	Westworld	Deputy Foss	Recurring role (season 1); 4 episodes
2016	Game of Silence	Terry Bausch	Main cast 10 episodes
2017–2018	Frontier	Charleston	Main cast (seasons 2–3); 8 episodes
2017–2018	The Brave	CPO Ezekiel "Preach" Carter	Main cast 13 episodes
2018–2019	The Rookie	Det. Kevin Wolfe	Recurring role (season 1); 5 episodes
2020	Lovecraft Country	Marvin Baptiste	Episode: "Sundown"
2020–2022	Fear the Walking Dead	Emile LaRoux	Guest role (season 6, Episode: "The End Is the Beginning")
2020–2022	Fear the Walking Dead	Josiah LaRoux	Recurring role (season 7, 3 episodes)
2020	NCIS: Los Angeles	Raymond Lewis	Episode: "If the Fates Allow"
2021–2023	Swagger	Grant Carson	4 episodes
2022	Guillermo del Toro's Cabinet of Curiosities	Eddie	Episode: "Lot 36"
2023	Spring Breakthrough	Clark Randall	Television film (Hallmark)
2025	Law & Order	Darryl Moore	Episode: "A Price to Pay"
2026	Wonder Man	Eric Williams	Disney+ series; 2 episodes

=== Video games ===
Year	Title	Role
2011	L.A. Noire	Jermaine Jones
2016	NBA 2K17	Washington Falls
2019	Call of Duty: Modern Warfare	Sergeant Marcus Griggs (multiplayer only)

== Awards and nominations ==
Year	Title	Award	Nomination
2009	A Quiet Fire	Winner of the Sirrocco Award at the AOF Film Festival. AOF nomination for Best Supporting Actor in a Short Film.	Nominated for the Sirrocco Award at the AOF Film Festival. AOF nomination for Best Supporting Actor in a Short Film. (WIN)
2013	This Is Martin Bonner	2013 Sundance Awards: Audience Award Winner for Best of NEXT for This Is Martin Bonner.	2013 Sundance Awards: The Audience Award: Best of NEXT. (WIN)
2014	Counter	Idyllwild IIFC 2015	Awards for Acting - Best Actor In A Short Film (WIN) & Cinematography -Best Cinematography – Short. (WIN)
2014	The Road Weeps, The Well Runs Dry	24TH Annual NAACP Theatre Awards: “The Road Weeps, The Well Runs Dry.”	Best Lead Male
2015	Samaria	2015 Student Academy Awards Samaria (Short Film)	Best Narrative
2024	The Sound of Hope	Septimius Awards	Winner, Best American Actor
2024	The Sound of Hope	Red Letter Awards	Best Actor
2025	The Sound of Hope	Golden Crowd Award	Winner, Best Actor in a Leading Role

== Producing ==
Year	Title	Notes
2009	A Quiet Fire	Short Film, Producer
2010	Moonshiner	Short Film, Associate Producer
2013	Last Cry For Katrina	Documentary, Executive Producer
2015	Godfrey	Just Announced, Executive Producer, Director
