= Solitary (TV series) =

- Created by: Lincoln D. Hiatt; Andrew J. Golder
- Starring: Keri Tombazian
- Country of origin: United States
- No. of seasons: 4
- No. of episodes: 36

Production
- Executive producers: Andrew J. Golder; Lincoln D. Hiatt
- Running time: 45 minutes

Original release
- Network: Fox Reality Channel
- Release: May 29, 2006 – March 20, 2010

Solitary is a reality show on the Fox Reality Channel whose contestants were kept in round-the-clock solitary confinement for a number of weeks with the goal of being the last contestant remaining in solitary, for a $50,000 prize. It was the channel's first original series commission with its debut on May 29, 2006. The last season, Solitary 4.0, ended on March 20, 2010.

A German version is broadcast on German TV channel ProSieben, and a Brazilian version was broadcast on SBT between 2010 and 2011. Solitary 3.0 also broadcast in Singapore.

== Premise ==
The show calls itself a "social experiment" in determining the physical and mental endurance of the competitors.

The show's theme is based on solitary confinement; accordingly, the contestants are placed in isolated pods, with only an artificial intelligence named Val to communicate with. In reality, Val's voice is a computer-modified human voice. In the first season, Val was voiced by the show creator who was male and whose voice was altered; for all remaining seasons, Val was voiced by actress Keri Tombazian. In season 2, Val's voice has only minor computer modification. However, some "corruption" can be heard in the voice pattern where Val speaks a word or two in a similar voice to season 1. In the subsequent rebroadcast of the season 1 episodes, the producers replaced the computer-sounding voice with the more feminine voice that was used in season 2. In the season 3 episode "Rest In Pieces," Val's "eye" turns red and its voice takes a deep, sonorous, distorted tone, similar to that of Jigsaw in Saw, while giving instructions for the episode's test. Val is possibly a reference to HAL, the demented computer who takes over the spaceship in 2001: A Space Odyssey. The AI and main antagonist GLaDOS from the video game Portal bears a slight resemblance in tone and voice to Val. Val also often makes references to the fact that she is a computer (e.g. by saying "If I had feelings, they would be hurt right now").

No contact with the outside world – or other competitors – is permitted, with the following exceptions:

- At the very beginning, a final two-minute phone call is permitted.
- The guests had a chance to send a letter to their loved one. (In season 2, at one point, Val gave them pen and paper.)
- In season 1, on two occasions, the guests were allowed to speak to each other, but only through Val.
- In season 2, another phone call was auctioned off in the fourth episode, and the last two contestants in the final were allowed to taunt each other via Val.
- In season 3, contestants were randomly paired in pods for the first challenge in the first episode, and the last two contestants were again allowed to taunt each other via Val in the final.
- In season 4, guests were given the opportunity to send a message via Val to number 6, as he was considering sharing his reward of beer and peanuts.

Beyond the social isolation, there is also isolation from time, with no clocks, watches, or other timepieces available to contestants. There are no environmental time cues (sunlight or moonlight).

The environment is completely controlled, from temperature, light, access to a restroom, food, etc. In addition, the room is roughly octagonal, adding another disorienting aspect.

Players are only referred to by their number, not their name. This is an additional separation from the world, as their identity is reduced to a number. (This is similar to The Prisoner.) Out of respect, Val did call two contestants by name at the termination of their experiences: season 3's "RobRob" and season 2 and 4's Tyler.

A season 1 episode stated that alcohol was not permitted. However, one guest received a plate of cheese and a glass of wine as a prize in season 3 and another won beer and peanuts in season 4.

== Format ==
Each season starts with the players finding themselves in their "pods", small octagonal cells approximately 10 feet (3.0 m) across, and identified by Val by the number of their pod. The pods include a "meal slot" where food and other items may be given to the players as part of the "treatment"; several cameras, microphones, and one-way mirrors; and a lockable door to an "ante-pod" chamber where players may use the bathroom, be sequestered while challenges are set up in the pods, or for further interviews. Most importantly, the pods each contain a flat-screen television representing Val and red and green push buttons below it.

The environment of the pods is under control of Val, including the lighting, the temperature, and other features such as a retractable bed that may be offered at times. While players are given sufficient water, their meals are rationed, typically consisting of either a tasteless "nutrition bar" or a very small portion of a food item, e.g. a single grape or almond. However, as either a reward or part of a challenge, players are sometimes given larger amounts of more nourishing food items. Furthermore, while each pod is equipped with a proper bed, Val will often limit the amount of sleep the players get by making sure they stay awake, though the players are granted short sleep periods at times. Players only communicate with Val during the game, with Val being their proxy should they be allowed to "communicate" to another player.

Once in the game, players are required to perform actions as instructed by Val. Players must press the green button to request permission to use the bathroom or make other similar requests. Outside of the "Treatment" phase, the player may hit the red button at any time to indicate they wish to quit the game.

The game then cycles between "Tests" and "Treatments", along with other less strenuous activities that may be conducted by Val. During a "Test", players will compete against each other (though unaware of how the other players are performing) in completing a task set by Val. These tasks are generally physically and mentally grueling, taking several hours to complete. For example, players may have to use a piece of exercise equipment a certain number of times to gain a portion of a brain teaser to be solved. There are often additional distractions that will occur during the Test, such as Val interjecting random facts to throw off counting. Val will inform players when they are correct but will wait until either all the players have finished or after a certain amount of time before announcing the winner. The Test winner has immunity from the upcoming Treatment, and in some cases has the ability to handicap another player in the upcoming Treatment, such as by making them perform an extra round before the other players start. Sometimes, an extra reward is given to the Test winner to make their Immunity more enjoyable, such as a decent amount of sleep on their bed or a decent sized portion of real food items (usually in the form of a well rounded meal consisting of the Test winner's favorite foods).

The "Treatment" phase is generally a more painful endurance exercise, such as sleeping on a bed of small rods, spinning quickly around in a chair, or "jumping" a heavy rope. Some Treatments are simply endurance tests with no set bounds, while other Treatments are broken into a number of rounds with increasingly more difficult goals to achieve. In the latter case, if a player cannot finish a round, they are sometimes given the opportunity to do a penalty round to catch up, though further exhausting that player. Some treatments would have each round be competitive. In this case, the player who did the best in each round was allowed to skip the next round, while the player who did the worst had to do the penalty round, which increased in difficulty with each penalty round endured. At any time during the Treatment, a player may hit the red button to quit the Treatment, at which point they no longer have to participate; they also may be forced to press the red button should they break any of the rules of the Treatment (in particular, if a contestant vomits during a Treatment where food items are being consumed, Val declares that "your body will have quit for you"). However, the first player to hit the red button during the treatment will be required to leave the show. (There was one instance in season two when Val decided prior to one particular Treatment that no one would be excluded, although no mention was made of this until after the Treatment was over.) The other players are not told when a player has left the Treatment, and generally the Treatment continues from the end of one show into the start of the next with the remaining players attempting to outlast the others. After a given amount of time or a number of rounds, Val will inform the remaining players the Treatment is over, allowing them to continue in the game. Shortly thereafter, Val will notify the remaining contestants as to which guest has been eliminated.

When the game is down to two players, a final Test may reward the winning player with a brief advantage during the final Treatment. As with other Treatments, the Treatment continues until either both players press the red button or until a set amount of time passes after one player has pressed the button. The player that outlasts the other in the final Treatment is awarded $50,000, although in the way the show is broadcast, Val keeps the winner inside their chamber forever, as in 2.0, 3.0 and 4.0, or the winner is seen being killed by the final treatment, as in 1.0 (although, of course, this is simply part of the story, and in reality, the winner is permitted to leave immediately following their victory).

== Season 1 ==
=== Players ===
Pod	Contestant	Age	Occupation	Synopsis	Ranking
1	Pamela Crawford	21	Travel agent	College student	Eliminated 6th
2	Michelle R.	31	Personal trainer	Mother of two daughters	Eliminated 2nd
3	Taralee D.	29	Fashion designer	The show turned her shyness into an outgoing personality	Eliminated 7th
4	Florin N.	30	Writer	Was born in Romania	Eliminated 5th
5	Mark Crumpton	36	Martial arts instructor	A Divorced Buddhist	Eliminated 8th, Runner-up
6	Cliff Heick	25	Stuntman	Obsessed with hair gel and Chapstick	Eliminated 4th, Outside of a treatment
7	Steven Gee	35	High School English teacher	Break dancer	Winner
8	Danielle Flanagan	29	Beautician	Once a member of a fight club	Eliminated 3rd
9	David Drachman	28	Member of Mensa	Working for a non-profit organization	Eliminated 1st

=== Episodes ===
==== Episode 0: The Road to Solitary ====
Original airdate: May 29, 2006

"The Road to Solitary" episode shows behind the scene footage of cast auditions, setting up for the season, the crew, and other such things. It is revealed that Florin wasn't originally going to be on the show; he was a backup cast member in case one backed out. He made it onto the program after Chris decided that he didn't like how the crew handled getting him to the set; at which point Florin was picked over Ariel, the other backup cast member. When Ariel learned she hadn't been picked, she was allowed to walk around backstage and see what the show was like. The episode also shows several challenges that didn't make it into the program because they were too much of a health risk, such as sitting in a tub of ice water as long as possible, as well as how the octagonal rooms were conceived.

==== Episode 1: The Experiment Begins ====
Original airdate: June 5, 2006

Upon arriving, the guests were given their new identity in which the number they see in their pod as their new name while their real names mean nothing in Solitary. The guests get two minutes to make their final phone calls, though Val cuts the calls short. The first Test gives each player a list of the three personal items brought by each player and allows them to determine which they could deny the other player, though in reality, no personal items would be withheld. While some guests took away no items, number 7 (Steve) ended up taking away every single personal item yet unaware to all guests that Val will not take away any personal items regardless to what choices the guests made. The guests were also given a meal consisting of fruit and a tasteless food bar. The first Treatment allows the players to sleep, but at given intervals, are awoken by sirens. The sirens can only be silenced by entering the correct code in a limited amount of time on a keypad; each successive code becomes longer or a variation on the previous code. If a code is not inputted or an incorrect code is given, the alarms will remain active until either a guest decides to push the red button or until the treatment is over.

==== Episode 2: Bed of Nails ====
Original airdate: June 12, 2006

In the test, the contestants must solve a mind-bending math puzzle embedded in a horror film which goes for twenty minutes in which the answer is "168". They were also given popcorn and soda to enjoy while watching the film (unaware the popcorn is actually helpful in counting). If the guests fail to provide the correct answer, they are forced to re-watch the whole film again and again until someone comes up with the right answer and is freed from the next treatment. For the treatment, the guests must endure the pain of lying on a bed of nails. The bed is covered in wooden pegs in all different sizes. They start out with five pillows, but slowly one by one they have to remove the pillows until it is just them lying on the bed.

==== Episode 3: To Eat or Not to Eat ====
Original airdate: June 19, 2006

The Test requires players to estimate when three hours elapsed, using a variety of items including a deck of cards, an hourglass timed for 12 seconds (dinner as a reward but also immune from taking part in the next treatment. Since the players have already gone through a long amount of time of lack of food, for the treatment the guests have to eat and consume large quantities of food in two minutes. If the player fails a round, they would be given a penalty round which consists of eating a second portion plus any food that was not eaten during the round. If a guest vomits, the player is forced to quit the treatment.

==== Episode 4: Brainwashing ====
Original airdate: June 26, 2006

As the treatment continues on, Number 6 (Cliff) vomited in which ended up becoming an argument with Val as he stated that he didn't quit. Val stated that vomiting is a survival mechanism as the body ended up rejecting the treatment. Cliff refused to hit the red button which ended up breaking the rules of Solitary. Later throughout the episode, Cliff was given an evaluation form which he ended up stating about not having his chap stick. Because Cliff broke the rules again, he was not allowed to partake in the next test and be forced to do the next treatment. Cliff was also given a mandatory time out as he was given a video camera and a few hours of sleep hoping it would help him.

The Test involves Val brainwashing the players and showing them a series of images and facts with purposely incorrect names or details (such as showing a flower but calling it a hand grenade). After the display of pictures, the players are quizzed on 25 these new "facts". If no guest is able to provide a perfect score, they would be quizzed again until someone gets all 25 answers. In case of a tie, the guests are given 20 questions and whoever gets the highest score is freed from the next treatment.

While players prepared for a Treatment in this episode by applying facepaint as warriors, Number 6 (Cliff), who had refused to cooperate with the rules, he stepped outside his pod triggering the alarms and ended up eliminating himself from Solitary. Val convinced Cliff of what he had to go through in Solitary and eventually convinced him to hit the red button. Meanwhile, the Treatment did not begin until the next episode.

==== Episode 5: Head Spin/Tailspin ====
Original airdate: July 3, 2006

For the treatment the guests are subjected to a barrage of loud noises which is to assault their sanity such as the sounds of flies buzzing, babies crying, dentists drill, even an air raid alarm. Further into the treatment the guests are not allowed to have their ears covered. Nobody ended up quitting the treatment, unlike most other editions of Solitary.

The Test requires players to count hundreds of bouncy balls dropping through their food slot into the pod, without the aid of light and while Val rattles off random numbers to attempt to disrupt their counting. Players have only one chance to guess the number, and the Test continues with different number of bouncy balls until one player guesses it correctly. The Treatment, divided into rounds, has each player spin in a chair a certain number of rotations in a fixed amount of time; failure to do so would require the player to perform a penalty round to make up for the lost spins. If a player should vomit, they would be forced to quit the Treatment.

==== Episode 6: Val Turns Up the Heat ====
Original airdate: July 10, 2006

Prior to the Test, the lights in each pod are turned off, allowing each player to express their deepest fears. The Test involves players finding a secret message among an array of letters on a board (Obey the Machine). The board is only lit for 40 seconds after the player completes 40 steps on a stair exercise machine. Val will also help out by telling the guests to omit certain letters off the board. As a result, two guests ended up in a very close tie but only one was able to earn freedom from the upcoming treatment.

Then, the players are given a pillow and some paint, allowing them to express their current feelings. The Treatment requires that each player drink a vial of liquid and hold it in their mouth for one minute. Each vial contains additives to simulate the heat of a jalapeño pepper, with each vial getting progressively hotter with progressing rounds. Between rounds, the players may use one of several "soothers", including bread, rice, yogurt, olive oil, and water, but may use each soother only once.

==== Episode 7: Everyone Goes Mad ====
Original airdate: July 17, 2006

The Test requires players to memorize and recite a long speech. The players would only be able to see the speech for ten seconds after dunking their head in a tank of water for ten seconds, though players would not have any indication of how long they were under water. The Treatment, broken into rounds, has each player complete a number of "circuits" in their pod (consisting of hitting two white buttons and the green button in order). Subsequent rounds requires the players to add weight in the backpacks they carried and decreased the amount of time to complete 50 circuits. If a player fails a round, they would be required to do another 50 circuits in a given time.

==== Episode 8: The Final Experiment ====
Original airdate: July 24, 2006

The final Treatment requires each player to enter a small black box containing rounded pegs similar to the bed of nails from an earlier Treatment, along with a video monitor and red and green buttons. Players would not be able to leave the box upon entering unless they opted to quit. Over time, the walls would move in on the player.

==== Episode 9: Solitary Reunion Special ====
Original airdate: July 31, 2006

The nine former pod people, including the grand-prize winner look back on their time inside their octagon-shaped cells and reveal the inside scoop on what it was like dealing with their solitude and the infamous Val.

After an interview with some of the members (filled with regrets, such as Number 9 regretting being the first to quit), the big question is asked: What will Steve do with US$50,000? He and his wife decided to give some of the money to Autism Speaks to help Number 2, Michelle, whose daughter is autistic (this was her plan if she won). It is not revealed what the rest would be spent on. The show ends with Steve break-dancing for everyone.

=== Guest Progress History ===
Episode	1	2	3	4	5	6	7	8
Test	Cruelty or Kindness	Horrific Equation	Time Will Tell	Brainwash	Ball Flood	Foot Step Message	Speech Dunk	None
Treatment	Alarming Nap	Bed of Nails	Solitary Barffet	Sonic Assault	Head Spin	Jalapeño Bar	Weight Circuit	Little Black Box
Test Winner	N/A	1: Pamela	7: Steven	4: Florin	3: Taralee	3: Taralee	7: Steven	N/A
Didn't Quit	1,3,4,5,6,7	3,6,7	1,4,5	1,3,5,7	1,7	7: Steven	5: Mark	7: Steven
Quit (in order)	2: Michelle	5: Mark	6: Cliff	6: Cliff	5: Mark	5: Mark	3: Taralee	5: Mark
	8: Danielle	4: Florin	3: Taralee		4: Florin	1: Pamela		
	9: David	8: Danielle	8: Danielle					
		2: Michelle						

Winner of the test, and is exempt from the treatment.
First person to quit the treatment, therefore eliminated from Solitary.
Voluntarily quit outside a treatment, therefore eliminated from Solitary.
Winner of Solitary

== Solitary v2.0 ==
Production of a second season began in March 2007. The season began with a behind-the-scenes look into the casting process as well as the development of the test and treatments with "The Road to Solitary v2.0", which aired on August 4, 2007. The season premiered on August 11, 2007. The tagline this season was "Welcome Back to Isolation."

=== Players ===
Pod	Contestant	Age	Synopsis	Ranking
1	Stephen Sutton	25	Hurricane Katrina survivor & devout Baptist	Eliminated 2nd
2	Deena Holland	27	Accountant who's "obsessed with showering"	Eliminated 4th
3	Nikki Epel	33	Radio personality "Nikki Knight" & self-proclaimed masochist	Eliminated 7th
4	Kimberly Shields	27	Recovering alcoholic	Eliminated 1st (outside of a treatment)
5	Leroy Patterson	24	Backyard wrestler, stuntman, & video game geek	Eliminated 3rd
6	Michelle Sims	30	Marathon runner & mother of two	Eliminated 5th
7	Tyler Tongate	27	Environmentalist, & former Navy sailor	Eliminated 8th (Runner-up)
8	Phu Pham	22	Photographer, lives with parents	Winner
9	John "J.P." Palyok	33	High school football star and former Survivor: Vanuatu contestant	Eliminated 6th

=== Episodes ===
==== Episode 0: The Road to Solitary 2.0 ====
Original airdate: August 4, 2007

VAL recaps Solitary's previous season, and briefly profiles the contestants "volunteering" for Solitary v2.0 and gives a peek behind the scenes, with a sneak preview of season two.

==== Episode 1: Welcome to Solitary...Now Go Home ====
Original airdate: August 11, 2007

The Test requires players to stay within a small black box for three hours, though players would not be given any timepieces to track the time, instead relying on objects given to them, such as stones and chalk to help them track it. The player that remained in the box closest to the three hours would win. After the Test, the players are given their last phone calls with loved ones. Before the Treatment, Number 4 (Kimberly) decides to quit the game, worried that she would revert to alcoholism as a result of the game. The Treatment required players to stand on a bed of nails without any shoes for as long as possible.

==== Episode 2: Say Hello to Your Little Friend ====
Original airdate: August 18, 2007

Prior to the Test, the players are allowed to draw on walls, and are given a pet mouse to help connect to their loneliness. The Test requires players memorize a long message; they would only be able to see the message by moving one hundred bricks from one platform to another in their pod; however, the message would be displayed at very different speeds. Later, the test would no longer require the players move bricks to see the message. The Treatment requires each player to "dance" with a mannequin that was weighted with 30% of the player's body weight around the perimeter of the pod a fixed number of times in each round. No player is eliminated from quitting the Treatment. Starting with this episode, there appeared to be a growing rivalry between #7 (Tyler) and #9 (JP)

==== Episode 3: From Dusk 'til Dominoes ====
Original airdate: August 25, 2007

The Test requires players to set up a domino chain using 400 dominoes across two tables and two bridges and then knock them all down by only touching one. The Treatment consists of multiple rounds where each player would be required to drink a smoothie, created using subsequent additions of the players' favorite foods to the existing list of ingredients. If a player vomits at any time, they are forced to quit the treatment.

==== Episode 4: Don't Let This Happen To You ====
Original Airdate: September 1, 2007

Prior to the Test, players are told to grate ten onions in order to earn fifty thousand "Val-lers" — the unit of currency within Solitary as claimed by Val. The Test requires players to watch a movie consisting of a number of horrific images, and then to organize photos in the order shown within the movie, first ten photos, then thirty, then sixty. After the Test, the players participate in an auction using the Val-lers from before, which include deodorant, food items, the ability to have another player stay in the box from the first episode or experience sirens, and calls from home; the player with the most money at the end of the auction would have the ability to take away an item from a player. The Treatment requires players to jump rope using a heavy rope mounted on two blocks in their pod, completing a number of jumps in a given amount of time per round.

==== Episode 5: Open Wide and Say "Ouch" ====
Original Airdate: September 8, 2007

Prior to the Test, players are given a ball and told to bounce it, keeping track of their bounces; Val would reward the player that reported the most bounces (even if it was a lie) with a bowl of popcorn. The Test requires players to build a tunnel for their pet mice to navigate to the exit, using each of the 51 tunnel pieces that the player rewards after running 40 cycles on a treadmill. The Treatment requires each player to wear a ball gag for as long as possible while sitting on a large wooden chair.

==== Episode 6: Handcuffs Across America ====
Original air date: September 9, 2007 (intended to air September 15, 2007)

The players are forced to wear handcuffs, and then are given a bowl of gruel, which players may believe to contain the handcuff key but does not. The test has players attempting to find five balls out of several of various size and color; the balls are assigned false weights by Val that do not relate to their actual size, and the solution requires the total false weight to add up to a certain amount. The players are not initially given any means to track the math, relying on data presented by Val's screen, but are later given paint to make calculations on their pod walls. After the test, the players are given a large box filled with packing peanuts, one which contains the handcuff keys. The players are then later given the handcuff keys placed in their nutrition bar. The Treatment has the players spin around in a chair a certain number of times in a given time period, and then place an increasing larger and complex sequence of colored blocks from one mat to another.

==== Episode 7: All Locked Up and Nowhere to Go ====
Original Airdate: September 22, 2007

The players are given ten decks of cards to deal out on their pod floors, and then told to complete two decks in a specific order and then place them in the food slot. Val selects a winner at random to win a food bar, while the submitted decks of the other players will be altered even if they are correct. Next, Val repeats the ball bouncing activity from an earlier episode, telling players to report their scores, with the winner receiving a pancake meal. The Test requires players to remove 50 padlocks from a jacket using a keyring filled with numerous keys. Prior to the Treatment, the players are given a number of false facts to remember, and then subsequently quizzed on them, with the winning player getting an hour of sleep prior to the treatment, the losers getting an hour of sirens in their pod. For the Treatment, players have to assemble a four-piece cube puzzle on one side of the pod to drop a marble into a chute that would land on the other side of the pod; they would then disassemble and reassemble the puzzle to repeat the process. Each round of the treatment required the players to complete a number of drops in a limited amount of time, with penalties rounds consisting of step-ups onto the puzzle cube itself.

==== Episode 8: Hell Night - Morning - Afternoon ====
Original Airdate: September 29, 2007

The remaining players are exposed to three of the previous Tests, each for a reward of one hour of sleep and a penalty of one hour of sirens. The three Tests include spinning around in a chair, sorting pictures from a montage film of horrific clips, and setting up one hundred dominoes. The final Test requires players to assemble a plain white puzzle with blacklighted numbers; once the puzzle is completed, the players will be given a black light to identify the code and reveal a secret message. As it is the last Test before the final Treatment, the winner will receive an advantage during the Treatment. The Treatment itself is to have the players support themselves face-up on a "bed" made out of three parallel chains without touching the ground. The winner of the Test received a pillow to use during the first round. The second round requires the players to remove their shirts. The third round removed the middle chain, and required the players to support themselves without gripping the chains.

==== Episode 9: The Union 2.0 ====
Original Airdate: October 6, 2007

In this Reunion, the guests are introduced one-by-one in the order they quit. Upon seeing Number 9 (J. P.), Number 7 (Tyler) jumps on top of him in an embrace, rather than out of anger. Number 8 (Phu) is the last to come out, but not from backstage, from his pod door, suggesting that the pods were moved to the stage area before the taping of the special. The host then asks general questions about the show. Number 5 (Leroy) was given the pizza he wanted.

At one point, the host, Todd Newton, brought out the bed of nails from the first episode and has Phu stand on it barefoot. He was able not only to talk but also to jump up and down on the nails. Next, family members and friends got a chance to ask questions.

Differing from the reunion special of the first season, the contestants were given the opportunity to ask questions of Val. When Number 4 (Kimberly, the first to quit) asked who Val thought would win, she started by saying she thought Number 4 would win, but then went on to say all the other numbers except Number 9. When J. P. asked why, Val responded that she knew he was not going to win because she knew about his history of losing reality television shows. After other questions were asked, the show ends with Number 8 being given the $50,000 check, Number 8 saying that he would use the winnings to help his family (such as finishing off car payments), and the group hugging.

=== Guest Progress History ===
Episode	1	2	3	4	5	6	7	8
Test	Time Tracking	Mystery Message	Domino Chain	Solitary Cinema	Rat Race	Ball Addition	Lock and Key	Past Tests/Treatments
Treatment	Footbed of Nails	Dead Man Dancing	Vile Smoothie	Grump Rope	Gag Order	Revolutions/Chain of Blocks	Puzzle Box/Ball Drop	Hammock from Hell
Test Winner	8: Phu	7: Tyler	2: Deena	3: Nikki	9: J.P.	8: Phu	8: Phu	8: Phu
Didn't Quit	N/A	3,9	9: J.P.	6,7,9	3,7	3,7	7: Tyler	8: Phu
Quit (In order)	2: Deena	8: Phu	7: Tyler	8: Phu	8: Phu	9: J.P.	3: Nikki	7: Tyler
	3: Nikki	6: Michelle	6: Michelle	2: Deena	6: Michelle			
	9: J.P.	2: Deena	3: Nikki					
	6: Michelle	5: Leroy	8: Phu					
	5: Leroy		5: Leroy					
	7: Tyler							
	1: Stephen							
	4: Kimberly							

Winner of the test, and is exempt from the treatment
Winner of the final test, and earned an advantage in the final treatment
First person to quit the treatment, therefore eliminated from Solitary
Voluntarily quit outside of a treatment, therefore eliminated from Solitary
First person to quit the treatment, but was not eliminated from Solitary
Winner of Solitary 2.0

== Solitary v3.0 ==
Production of the third season began in August 2008. The season premiered on January 17, 2009, at 9p/8c. The tagline for this season is "You only have yourself to blame."

This show is also being used to launch the new Fox Reality Channel on-air pixel campaign.

=== Players ===
Pod	Contestant	Age	Occupation	Ranking
1	Jennifer Korbin	36	Pin-up model	Eliminated 3rd
2	Ceon Murray	23	Senior citizen's home director	Eliminated 4th
3	Katie Kaufman	19	Aspiring actress	Eliminated 8th
4	Robert "RobRob" Hakel	38	Software Developer	Eliminated 9th
5	Maureen Francisco	31	Former TV reporter	Eliminated 5th
6	Dirrick "Trizz" Fretz	27	Cashier	Eliminated 2nd
7	Andrew Sabat	20	College student	Winner
8	Karrie McNeal	29	Childcare provider	Eliminated 7th
9	Jason "J" Scott	30	Bouncer	Eliminated 6th
*No pod	Jen Otenti	38	Web designer	Eliminated 1st before individual pods were assigned

At the beginning of the game, the ten players were divided into pairs and placed into five pods to act as teams for the first task. These pairs were as such:

Karrie and Trizz: Green Pod Maureen and Ceon: Orange Pod RobRob and Andrew: Pink Pod Jason and Jen: Yellow Pod Jennifer and Katie: Tan Pod

=== Episodes ===
==== Episode 1: Battle of the Pods ====
Original Airdate: January 17, 2009

Instead of nine players in separate pods, this series begins with ten players, paired in five pods. The first Test has the players walk around in a circle on rocks, eventually walking in bare feet. The two members of the team with the worst performance are then put to a one-on-one faceoff, where they are given one combination at a time to several locks on chains hanging from the ceiling; the player that finds the right lock places the attached five-pound length of chain on the other player; play continues until one player quits. Subsequently, the players are sequestered in their own pods. The Treatment has each player sitting on a series of "stool samples", ranging from a stool seat, a bicycle seat, a bowling ball, and eventually a small octagon. Players could not use either the floor or the footrest to help support their feet, or they would have to quit.

==== Episode 2: Pinch Me — I Must Be Nightmaring ====
Original Airdate: January 24, 2009

The remaining players are randomly paired to switch clothes. In the Test, in which they have to wear their assigned clothes, they must arrange a series of weights with each of the players' weights on them in order. Initially, Val would not tell the players how many were correct, but later indicated this number; regardless, players would need to replace the weights to their starting positions before guessing again. For the challenge, the guests are given a huge wok containing thousands of grains of rice and only one orange grain. Using only their chopsticks and without using their hands or pouring out the rice, the first one to find the orange grain earns an orange chicken meal. The Treatment involved the players attaching forty flesh pin at a time to their body (an additional eight pins were revealed in the next episode to be placed on the players' faces); the winner of the Test is able to select another player to wear two additional flesh pins.

==== Episode 3: Rats ====
Original Airdate: January 30, 2009

The remaining players are given seventeen glasses of root beer and ping pong balls; players would need to throw a ball into a glass to be able to drink that glass of root beer. Once the first sixteen glasses were consumed, they had to land a ball in the final glass. The order of finishing in this task sets the order for the next activity, a secret "gift" exchange from Val, in which a player may either select one of the unknown mystery gifts, or select any of the other gifts already selected, forcing that player to select a new mystery gift; the winning player of the root beer challenge would select last. Gifts included both rewards such as food or an extra hour of sleep, penalties such as losing an hour of sleep, and, unknown to the players, an advantage on the Test. The Test required players to set up mousetraps in blocks of ten without setting off any previously set traps to earn the opportunity to search several blocks of cheese using only their mouth to find letter titles; the final tile, after all 70 traps were set up, was hidden in a bowl of nacho cheese. Once a player had all their letters, they would figure out the correct word ("ANGERED") though before they could reveal their answer to Val, they were to set off all their mousetraps. If their answer is incorrect, they would have to reset all 70 traps again before answering. The advantage won from the previous activity is to have five mousetraps permanently placed on the table.

The Treatment has players experiencing ten different odors from concentrates for several minutes. These rounds included the concentrates such as (but not all of them) horseradish, spoiled fish, rancid cat food, rotten oysters and road kill. Subsequently, players are required to drink a shotglass worth of two of the concentrates. (Horseradish and cow intestines). Unlike most previous episodes, the episode ended before the first player to be eliminated from a treatment was determined; one player had quit out but another was about to start a penalty round and would be forced to quit and leave the game if they could not finish; otherwise the other player would need to leave.

==== Episode 4: I Am a Complete Idiot ====
Original Airdate: February 7, 2009

In the conclusion from the previous episode, Number 5 (Maureen) completed her penalty rounds, and Number 2 (Ceon) was eliminated.

The Test requires players to stay in a wheelchair while reading a long passage printed in very small letters along the edge of the room, and then to recite the passage verbatim to Val. The start of the passage is not indicated (unaware the guests were facing the start of the message while Val was explaining the test), and before players could guess, they would need to spin in their wheelchair three times. Before the Treatment, players use 16 slips of paper, each representing thirty minutes of sleep, to bid on various items, including food and penalties for the other players; prior to the treatment, the players would be able to sleep for how many hours they had not used in bidding. One guest was given a treatment handicap in which involves eating a marshmallow treat in 30 seconds. The Treatment, broken into rounds, requires each player to eat as many sweet food items (such as doughnut holes or malted milk balls) in a fixed time; the player with the most would not need to participate in the next round, while the player with the fewest would have to take a penalty round, drinking an increasing quantity of milk by 4oz. for each penalty round they underwent. If the player vomits, they are out of the game.

==== Episode 5: Sweeney Pod ====
Original Airdate: February 14, 2009

For this round's test, the contestants are faced with a hanging goat carcass in the middle of each of their pods. The objective is to tear as close to nine pounds of meat off the carcass as possible, with the guests using their own method of weighing. Once the contestant feels that they have torn off nine pounds of meat, they signal Val by pressing the green button. The two players closest to nine pounds of meat will win the test. In the treatment, the contestants must crawl over and under obstacles on the floor of their pod on their hands and knees. Contestants must complete a set number of laps under a set amount of time. If a contestant fails to do so, a penalty round will be given consisting of additional laps plus any that were not done during the round. If a contestant fails the penalty round, the number of laps keep increasing as a harder penalty round is given until the contestant is almost forced to quit the game.

==== Episode 6: Hello, My Name is Chubby ====
Original Airdate: February 21, 2009

Before the Test, the players participate in a rock, paper, scissors contest, the winner receiving a four-course meal of their choice. For the Test, players would race to put on 48 T-shirts, with shirt sizes starting from the player's size and larger, though the shirts are presented haphazardly on their pod floors. The Treatment begins with each player memorizing the "Valphabet", where each letter is associated with a word related to "Solitary". During the Treatment, each player would write the associated word for the letter given by Val backwards on a pane of plexiglass so it would appear to Val as correct as it could be. Each player is allowed to miss once, but after missing a second time or after completing the entire alphabet, the player would be required to keep their face touching a specific part of the plexiglass while bending over from a standing position. If the player's face or their tongue loses contact with the glass at any time, they would have been forced to quit. After some time, the players would then be forced to do this without using their hands for support, and then would be required to keep their tongue against the glass, followed by having to stand on one foot (In addition, setting their selected foot down also counts as a quit).

==== Episode 7: Rest in Pieces ====
Original Airdate: February 28, 2009

The Treatment from the previous episode concluded with the remaining guests in the treatment being required to stand on one foot before finally being told it was over. A challenge was presented to the final 3 guests in a game of Jenga with massive blocks, with the winner receiving a large sandwich and the guests who knocked their tower over receiving an hour of sirens. The Test in this episode required the guests to construct a coffin within 20 minutes, after which they would have to lie in it for as close to 1 hour as possible, while Val distracted them by reciting numbers and math equations. After a certain amount of time, a relative would give each guest a eulogy, referring to them by their pod number instead of their name. After the test was completed, each guest was asked to write their own life story, filling up both sides of a paper that Val then shredded. The first guest to piece their life story together and read it aloud to Val won a reward of a milkshake, while the guests that did not finish piecing their lives together had a set of alarm clocks placed around them to disturb their sleep. This episode's treatment made the two remaining guests lie on a web of twelve tightly wound ropes of varying sizes and knot patterns. After each round, the guests would have to detach one of their ropes, chosen by their opponent. In later rounds, they received the option of lying face-up or face-down, a choice previously made by Val. At any time if a guest falls off the ropes completely, they would have been forced to quit the treatment.

==== Episode 8: The W of S 3.0 Equals ====
Original Airdate: March 7, 2009

The Treatment from the previous episode is completed. The remaining players are given a Test where they wear a specially designed maze over their head and on their shoulders, which they use to roll gumballs from a marked start to the finish, where their mouth is located. The players race to guide five gumballs through the maze, and then must roll a sixth gumball through the maze while blindfolded. The loser is handicapped in the final Treatment. The Treatment requires players to hold two conducting rods at arms' length against designated sections two electrified posts. The losing player's handicap is to wear chains on their wrists while performing one round prior to the Treatment. In the first several rounds of the treatment, the players are given a puzzle to solve (e.g. "8 S. to an O." would be "Eight Sides to an Octagon"), the first to solve it would have to hold the rods for a shorter time than the other player. After the puzzle rounds are over, neither player is given a time advantage. The 21st round has no time limit and goes until one player quits the Treatment. In the end, instead of leaving his pod, Val told the winner to put their wands back on the electrical beams. Then she said, " ... to further continue with my experiment, put your wands up to the highest level...forever. Welcome to Solitary 4.0." The winner did so, then the lights went out.

=== Guest Progress History ===
Episode	1	2	3	4	5	6	7	8
Test	Rocky Road	Guess My Weight	Cheese Trap	Wheely Long Message	Meat Shop	Heavy Torso	Time To Die	Gumball Maze
Treatment	Stool Sample	In a Real Pinch	Aroma Therapy	Just Desserts	Crawling Like a Baby	Kiss My Glass	Tied In a Knot	Arms Race
Test Winner	4,7	2: Ceon	4: RobRob	9: Jason	3,8	3: Katie	7: Andrew	7: Andrew
Didn't Quit	2,8	4,7,8,9	3,7,8,9	4,7,8	7: Andrew	7: Andrew	N/A	7: Andrew
Quit (In order)	5: Maureen	5: Maureen	5: Maureen	3: Katie	4: RobRob	4: RobRob	4: RobRob	4: RobRob
	1: Jennifer	3: Katie	2: Ceon	5: Maureen	9: Jason	8: Karrie	3: Katie	
	9: Jason	1: Jennifer						
	3: Katie							
	6: Trizz							
	Jen							

Winner of the test; exempt from the treatment.
Winner of the final test; got to handicap the other player.
First person to quit the treatment, therefore eliminated from Solitary.
Eliminated before individual pods were assigned.
Winner of Solitary 3.0

== Solitary v4.0 ==
The casting call ended on June 24 and filming began mid-July. Solitary 4.0 aired on Friday, January 29, 2010. The official air date was Saturday, January 30.
The tagline for this season is "Scream all you want."

=== Players ===
Pod	Contestant	Age	Synopsis	Ranking
1	Nic Leland	25	Camp counselor, Survived testicular cancer	Eliminated 2nd
2	Rommel Gargoles	30	Martial arts instructor	Eliminated 9th, Runner-up
3	Kelsey Thorn	20	Student, High school football player, Bridge Jumper	Winner
4	Courtney Hill	21	Dance instructor, Mormon, Fluent in Japanese	Eliminated 3rd
5	Todd Ranck	31	Veteran game show contestant, Bartender	Eliminated 5th
Original #6	Rhonda Lucero	40	Entrepreneur, Mother of three	Eliminated 1st (replaced by Tyler Tongate)
6	Tyler Tongate	29	Solitary 2.0 Runner-up, Environmentalist, U.S. Navy veteran	Replaced original #6, Eliminated 8th
7	Bea Henington	35	Missionary, Ghost hunter, English teacher	Eliminated 7th
8	Eriq Shaw	21	Rapper	Eliminated 4th
9	Liberty Freeman	33	Children's party entertainer, Died three times	Eliminated 6th

=== Episodes ===
==== Episode 1: Unchained Malady ====
Original Airdate: January 29, 2010

Upon arriving, the guests are already locked in chains and must figure out the lock combination to free themselves. The combo is just four of the same number, the number of the pod they are in. The order they unlock themselves in, is the order they get to choose an exercise item for the next event. In the event, they must collect vials of their own sweat in half hour rounds. After four rounds, whoever collects the least amount of sweat is forced to push the red button and go home. Once a pod was eliminated, they were then replaced by Tyler Tongate, the runner-up from Solitary 2.0. Next the guests are sent into their first treatment where they mix together two various liquid foods ( as the treatment gets further in, they would have to mix together three ingredients and were given five new ingredients to mix in) to make a Solitary cocktail in which they must first drink, and then it is sent to the rest of the podmates to drink. The order of which the guests get to make cocktails is based on a random number generator. If the player does not want to drink or vomits, they would have been forced to quit the treatment. One guest cannot handle the taste of a cocktail and is sent home. Pod #6 was eliminated and replaced with 2.0 contestant.

==== Episode 2: Fight Club ====
Original Airdate: February 6, 2010

The barftending treatment finishes up with five players who did not quit. The guests then get sleep; an hour and eleven minutes of it. They were then asked how long they thought they were sleeping. Based on how close their guesses were to the actual amount of time they slept decided how many guns they received in the first test of this season. The test had them choosing another guest who would then use one of their guns and shoot themselves. Everyone had one gun filled with fake blood, and the rest were filled with water. If they were chosen by a player, then they had to randomly choose a gun and shoot themselves. If the guest shoots itself with fake blood, he/she is eliminated from the test and the guest who made the selection gets to choose again. Last two guests had to choose between five new guns and the last person standing wins the test. Val then released a fact about every guest, and asked each player based on that fact, if the guest should be rewarded or punished. If they got more votes for a reward, then they got a slice of pizza. If they got more votes for punish, then they got sirens. Lastly the guests went into their next treatment. They had an assortment of items that they had to slap themselves with such as a toy hand, cookie sheet, baseball bat, & a spatula to make a sound meter go into the red zone. Guests were also given baby oil to reduce the pain from the slaps but also lowers sound friction. If they didn't complete a round, they had to smack themselves in the butt with a hard wooden paddle within a time limit. Pod #1 was eliminated

==== Episode 3: A Pain In The Neck ====
Original Airdate: February 13, 2010

Val finishes up the slap unhappy treatment without anyone else quitting. In the test, the guests must type up six quotes from various past guests on a keyboard. The keys on the keyboard are completely scrambled and none of them are actually the letters labeled. Afterward, to keep spirits up, Val then allows them to video record a message, see a picture of loved ones, and then paint their bodies. In the treatment Val has them wear a laser pointer on their head. With specific body parts they must touch numbered octagons on the floor that add up to a specified number, and aim the laser in an octagon on the wall for a certain amount of time. No other part of their body may touch the floor except the ones used for the octagons. If they cannot do a round, then they must do a penalty round where they lie on the floor on their backs and lift their head to aim the laser at the octagon for a certain amount of time. Pod #4 was eliminated

==== Episode 4: Going Ape ====
Original Airdate: February 20, 2010

The pain in the neck treatment finishes up with just two others quitting. Val then gives each of them a steak and a grill and tells them whoever finishes their entire steak first will win. The winner gets to sleep in their normal bed while the others sleep in their bed filled with hay. The guests are then given paints and told to paint their pods however they would like. Next, Val gives them each 250 stamps and tells them to lick and stick all of them anywhere on their bodies. For the next test the podmates had to open jars of beach balls with objects over their hands such as traffic cones or horse brushes. They then had to stack the beach balls so that they would stand freely to a rope hanging across their pod. Once the test is over Val treats everyone to an auction. The amount of Vallors (one currency used in Solitary 4.0) the guests received for the auction was based on how fast they stuck all two hundred stamps on themselves. During the auction, a single contestant purchases both of the "letter from home" items; that contestant receives two copies of the same letter. In the treatment, the guests had to put on a gorilla suit and continue to do rounds of gorilla actions. These involved running laps around their pod, ground slaps, and cymbal crashes (unaware during the treatment, guests must also consume a banana in a round) within a time limit. If a guest fails to complete a round, they would have to do a penalty round which consists of eating a banana in one minute. If a guest vomits at any time, they would be forced to quit the treatment. Pod #8 was eliminated

==== Episode 5: Escape From Valcatraz ====
Original Airdate: February 27, 2010

The going ape treatment finishes with two other guests quitting. When the guests reenter their pods, there is a cell wall cutting them off from the majority of their pod. They must stay in this little area for twenty four hours. While in the jail cell they are told to write a letter home. In the test, there are keys scattered all over the floor of their pods. There are also keys hanging on hooks on the opposite end of their pod out of their reach. There is also a key hidden in a pant pocket hanging on the wall opposite them. They must obtain five keys to unlock five chains on their door, and one other key that unlocks the door. After the test, the guests are told to sit at one end of their pod, make paper airplanes, and throw them into a little hole in their meal slots. The winner gets peanuts and two beers. The winner comments that he might want to share the beers, and Val gives the other players an opportunity to pass along a message through her to convince him to give them one of his beers or some peanuts. Val "accidentally" relays one of the players' messages as asking for his "penis" instead of "peanuts"; the winner declines. Afterward, Val gives each of the guests a giant roll of paper and craft supplies. She tells them to create an outfit with it and walk like they are on a runway. She gives each of them a meal for participating. For the next treatment, the guests must play minigolf in their pods. They must get the ball into the hole in their door in a certain number of strokes. If they go over par, they must do a penalty round by spinning in a chair. Eventually Val has them only spin for rounds, and later they must spin and golf in the same round. If a player vomits at any time, they would be forced to quit the treatment. Pod #5 was eliminated

==== Episode 6: The Head of Nails ====
Original Airdate: March 6, 2010

The golf treatment finishes up with two other guests quitting. Val places a standing speed bag in each pod and has the guests get all of their aggression out, and explain what it is they are visualizing in place of the bag. They are then told to hit the bag as many times as possible in a certain amount of time. Whoever reports the highest amount will get the biggest chicken dinner, the second highest gets the second biggest meal, and so on. One guest decides that it is better to lie instead of being honest with Val, however Val punishes them by giving the a meal bar instead. In the test, the guests are navigating a maze of rooms on their TV screens. There is only one correct path to the finish room where they will see a virtual green button meaning they need to hit the real green button. Along the maze in certain rooms are number codes, where they must use four number blocks to figure out the random code, and grump rope rooms where they must do a certain amount of under overs. They are given a compass and jelly beans to help with the test. They are then given one of their personal items to use. Val then assigns each guest an instrument to play in the Solitary 4.0 air band. In the treatment, they must sit in a tall wooden chair with arms, seat, and back covered in metal pegs. They must also put on a metal crown attached to the top of the chair that puts more pressure on them pushing them into the pegs more. Each round, they must attach a metal chain (4 lbs) to a spike on the top of the crown thus adding even more weight and pressure onto them. Pod #6 was eliminated

==== Episode 7: Dunk if You're Ornery ====
Original Airdate: March 13, 2010

The past treatment finishes with one other guest quitting. Val decides to turn the heat up in their pods, and give them a T-shirt frozen into a cylinder shape. The first person to unfreeze the T-shirt and put it on would get two slices of pizza, the second would get one piece, and third place would get a piece of crust. For the test, the guests had to dunk their heads into bowls of colored pudding in a colored sequence they had to memorize. The sequence would keep getting longer up until thirty colors. If all the guests messed up any of the sequence, then the entire test would start over with a different sequence until someone correctly got all the way to thirty. The winner of the test did not win exemption from the treatment, but a penalty to give someone in the treatment as well as a penalty pass which allows a one-time skip of a penalty round. For the treatment, the guests had to balance a ball on a beam that they had to support on their neck and shoulders. They had to cross their pods in octagons on the floor, or on a balance beam. There were also chains hanging from the ceiling as obstacles. The guests had to race to hit the green button, and the last person to hit it, eventually both the last two, had to do a penalty round. The penalty round consisted of putting the beam on their shoulders, and squatting against the wall for a certain time, increasing with each penalty. Eventually, the rounds were only squats and nothing else. The time of their squats was a buildup of the time from their last penalty. The episode ends before anyone quit. Pod #7 was eliminated

==== Episode 8: Wheel of Misfortune ====
Original Airdate: March 20, 2010

The past treatment finishes sending the latest guest home. Val places several parts of past treatments in the pods. The guests are given two bananas, two wasabi shots, a monkey suit, and the crown of nails chair. The solitarians are then asked for each "round" what they want to do without any penalty or reward. They can either pass all of it to their opponent, pass half and do half, or do all of it. For instance, they can eat both bananas, eat one and pass one, or pass both. For the test, the guests had to cut wires to defuse a bomb. They had to cut colored cords depending on the answer to a question they were asked. On their screens were the words of colors, different colored fonts, a colored background, and Val would say a color for each screen that flashed by. Val would ask questions such as what is the color of the background of the thirteenth screen. If a guest cut the wrong color wire, then they would be out of the test. If both players cut the wrong cord, then no one would win the test and advantage for the final treatment. The winner of the test would be given an advantage in the final treatment which granted them two penalty passes. For the last treatment, the finalists had to run on a human hamster wheel. The guests had to run three revolutions to earn a guess. They would then guess a letter they thought would be in a word puzzle on their screen. When they finally knew the word, and it was right, then the other guest would have to do penalty laps. The guests continue to run until one can go no longer, and the other is crowned the winner of Solitary 4.0. Pod #3 Wins Solitary 4.0

=== Guest Progress History ===
Episode	1	2	3	4	5	6	7	8
Test	None	Russian Roulette	Quirky Keyboard	Beach Ball Tower	Jailbreak	Virtual Maze	Color Blind	Bomb Defusing
Treatment	Human Sprinkler Barftending	Slap Unhappy	Twisted Twister	Going Ape	Solitary InValtational	Head of Nails	Ball Balance	Wheel of Misfortune
Test Winner	N/A	7: Bea	5: Todd	6: Tyler	6: Tyler	6: Tyler	6: Tyler	3: Kelsey
Didn't Quit	2,4,6,7,9	2,3,5,6,8,9	2,6,9	2,7	2: Rommel	2: Rommel	2,3	3: Kelsey
Quit (In order)	8: Eriq	4: Courtney	3: Kelsey	9: Liberty	3: Kelsey	3: Kelsey	6: Tyler	2: Rommel
	3: Kelsey		7: Bea	3: Kelsey	7: Bea	7: Bea		
	5: Todd		8: Eriq	5: Todd	9: Liberty			
	1: Nic							
	6: Rhonda							

Winner of the test; exempt from the treatment.
Winner of the test but did not win exemption; got to handicap another player and earned an advantage in the next treatment.
Winner of the final test, and earned an advantage in the final treatment
First person to quit the treatment, therefore eliminated from Solitary.
Collected the least amount of sweat, therefore eliminated.
Winner of Solitary 4.0
