= Bjorn Anderson (filmmaker) =

American film director

- Born: Seattle, Washington, United States
- Occupations: film director, producer, screenwriter
- Years active: 2005–present
- Website: http://www.emeraldcitypictures.com/

Bjorn Anderson is known for producing and directing independent features, and is the owner of the production company, Emerald City Pictures. His films typically feature the picturesque landscapes of Washington state.

== Early life ==
Anderson was raised on Mercer Island, Washington. There he met Joseph Cole and Marco Scaringi who would later collaborate with Anderson on his films. Anderson went on to Pacific Lutheran University where he met another collaborator, Mike Ash. He graduated in 2002 with his Bachelor of Arts Degree in Psychology. Anderson later went to Seattle Pacific University where he graduated in 2007 with his master's degree in Industrial and Organizational Psychology.

== Career ==
Rather than going to film school, Anderson used his savings to make his first film. He quit his job on his 26th birthday to begin working on Warrior's End. This medieval epic premiered at Seattle's True Independent Film Festival 2009 where it won the Mt. Rainier award.

Anderson began his production company, Emerald City Pictures, to continue making films, but to also to make private and commercial videos. Anderson's next feature film was the horror movie, Eyes in the Dark, which began production in 2008. It premiered in April 2010 at the Alabama International Film Festival. Anderson came up with the idea for the movie from a reoccurring nightmare where he was chased by an unknown monster. Anderson is currently working on a script to follow Eyes in the Dark.
