= Warrior's End =

- Directed by: Bjorn Anderson
- Written by: Bjorn Anderson
- Produced by: Bjorn Anderson
- Starring: Zach Maurer; John Symonds; Paul Eenhoorn
- Cinematography: Joseph Cole
- Edited by: Aaron Henderson
- Music by: Rebecca Wolf-Nail
- Production company: Emerald City Pictures
- Release date: June 7, 2009 (STIFF)
- Running time: 105 minutes
- Country: United States
- Language: English

Warrior's End is a 2009 medieval epic film written and directed by Bjorn Anderson and starring Zach Maurer, John Symonds, and Paul Eenhoorn.

== Premise ==
While on tour of the northwestern border, the prince of Midea and his companions discover invading armies from neighboring Kilea. Unable to summon reinforcements in time, the young prince must make a stand to protect his people.

== Cast ==
- Mindy Byram as Maria
- Ricco DiStefano as General Tarkis
- Paul Eenhoorn as Kael
- Kevin Haggerty as Kole
- John Locke as King Harold
- Zach Maurer as Andreas
- Renee Pinzon as Julia
- John Symonds as Johan
- Phillip Wheeler as Will

== Production ==
Director Bjorn Anderson decided on his 26th birthday to quit his job and pursue his dream of filmmaking. Instead of paying to go to film school, he began work on his first film, Warrior's End. The production utilized the help of the Seattle Knights for many of the expansive sword battle scenes. The cast and crew worked on a volunteer basis which allowed the film to achieve its epic look on a limited budget.

== Release ==
The film had its premiere June 7, 2009 at Seattle's True Independent Film Festival, where it was given the Mt. Rainier Award.
