= Chad Hartigan =

Irish-American filmmaker

- Born: August 31, 1982 (age 44); Nicosia, Cyprus
- Occupation: Filmmaker
- Years active: 2006–present

Chad Alexander Hartigan (born August 31, 1982) is an Irish-American filmmaker.

== Early life ==
Chad Alexander Hartigan was born in Nicosia, Cyprus on August 31, 1982, the son of an Irish father from Limerick and an American mother from Sparks, Nevada. His parents met as Christian missionaries at a Youth with a Mission camp in England, where they were married before relocating to Nicosia. The family moved in 1995 to Virginia Beach, Virginia, where Hartigan attended Tallwood High School and became heavily involved in theater and video production. He graduated and was accepted to the North Carolina School of the Arts, the only college he applied to. He attended the filmmaking program at the college, where he was roommates with fellow filmmaker Aaron Katz, and graduated in 2004 with a BFA in directing.

== Career ==
Hartigan's first feature as director, Luke and Brie Are on a First Date, was made for $5,000 and premiered at the Hamptons International Film Festival in 2008 before going on to spawn an Argentine remake in 2013 called Luna en Leo, which was nominated for Best Adapted Screenplay by the Argentine Academy of Cinematography Arts and Sciences Awards. His second film, This Is Martin Bonner, premiered at the 2013 Sundance Film Festival and won the Best of NEXT Audience Award. It was also screened at the Karlovy Vary International Film Festival, Stockholm International Film Festival, and Torino Film Festival, among others. In 2014, it was awarded the John Cassavetes Award at the Film Independent Spirit Awards.

In 2014, Hartigan returned to the Karlovy Vary International Film Festival to serve on the Independent Camera jury. His third feature, Morris from America, premiered at the 2016 Sundance Film Festival in the U.S. Dramatic Competition where Hartigan was awarded the Waldo Salt Screenwriting Award. The film was released by A24. It was nominated for a Gotham Award and an Independent Spirit Award, and was named one of the top 10 independent films of the year by the National Board of Review.

In 2017, Hartigan directed an episode of the HBO series Room 104. His fourth film, and the first that he directed without being a writer or co-writer, was Little Fish. It was scheduled for release in 2020 before being delayed by the COVID-19 pandemic. It was released by IFC Films in February 2021 to critical acclaim and as of October 2026 is listed in Letterboxd's top 500 films of all time.

In 2025, his film The Threesome premiered at the SXSW Film Festival and was released theatrically by Vertical later that year.

== Filmography ==
Year	Title	Director	Writer	Executive Producer
2008	Luke and Brie Are on a First Date	Yes	Yes	No
2013	This is Martin Bonner	Yes	Yes	No
2016	Morris From America	Yes	Yes	No
2020	Little Fish	Yes	No	No
2025	The Threesome	Yes	No	Yes
