= Robert Burke (director) =

American film director

- Born: 1984 (age 41–42); United States
- Occupations: Screenwriter, film director, producer
- Years active: 1998–present

Robert Burke (born 1984) is an American screenwriter, producer and director. He founded the independent film production company Jumpshot Films in 1996. Burke is a graduate of the University of Washington, and a former actor.

== Production filmography ==
- Stewart Stern Unwritten (feature documentary) (in production) – director, producer
- The Scheme of Things (2027) (feature film) (post-production) – writer, director, producer
- Max Rules (2005) (feature film) – writer, director, producer
- Smigs (2001) (short film) – writer, director, producer
- Children of Afghanistan (2001) (short documentary) – producer
- Smigs (2001) (short film) – writer, director, producer
- Photo Finish (2000) (short film) – writer, director, executive producer
- Naughty Pooch (1998) (short film) – writer, director, producer
