= Max Rules =

- Directed by: Robert Burke
- Written by: Robert Burke
- Produced by: Robert Burke; Jerry Mahan
- Starring: William B. Davis; Andrew C. Maier; Jennifer Lancheros; Spencer Esau
- Cinematography: John Jeffcoat
- Music by: Matthew Bennett
- Production company: Jumpshot Films
- Distributed by: Peace Arch Entertainment
- Release date: 2004
- Running time: 80 minutes
- Country: United States
- Language: English

Max Rules is a 2004 kids' action-adventure feature film written and directed by Robert Burke.

== Synopsis ==
Max (Andrew C. Maier) and his friends Jessica (Jennifer Lancheros) and Scott (Spencer Esau) find thrills in spying on their families, sneaking into each other's houses, and organizing elaborate pranks at school. They have unique access to some of the most sophisticated equipment in the world, thanks to Max's Uncle, Rick Brinkley (William B. Davis), developer of top-secret equipment for the government. When Max discovers information about the whereabouts of a stolen FBI microchip, he and his friends use their skills and cutting edge technology to embark on the most dangerous mission of their lives.

== Production ==
Filming took place in Seattle and Bellevue, Washington.

== Festivals ==
- Tribeca Film Festival
- Seattle International Film Festival
- Salento International Film Festival - Salento, Italy
- HBO New York International Latino Film Festival
- Children's Film Festival - Cologne, Germany
- Seoul International Youth Film Festival
- Schlingel International Film Festival for Children
- Hannover Children's Film Festival
- Fort Lauderdale International Film Festival
- Staten Island Film Festival
