= Seattle Knights =

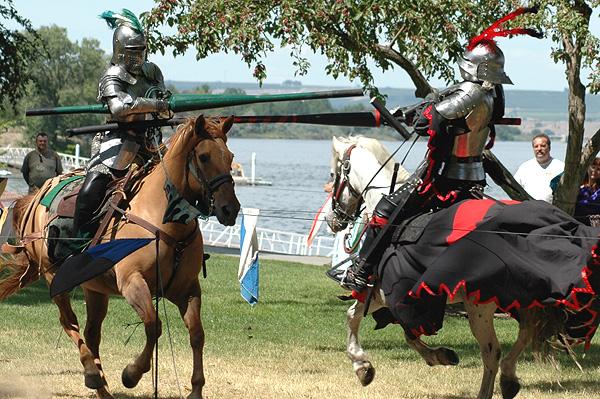
Seattle Knights Joust at Greenwood

The Seattle Knights is a stage-fighting and jousting acting troupe, specializing in Medieval Fantasy. The troupe was founded in 1992 by current Director Dameon Willich.

The troupe consists of performers from the Puget Sound area. Many of the Seattle Knights are professional actors who perform in local theaters around the Northwest, while others perform as a hobby or secondary to another career. Members are trained in a combat system that emphasizes safety and authenticity, as well as entertainment value. They have the best safety record in the industry.

== Television and film performances ==
The Seattle Knights and their members have worked in motion pictures, television, commercials, and radio. Members provided medieval combat stuntwork on the History Channel's 2001 series, "Modern Marvels: Battle Gear". Members of Seattle Knights performed equestrian stuntwork in the 1997 film The Postman, and the independent film Warrior's End.

== Live Shows ==
The Seattle Knights are actor-combatants, who perform choreographed, medieval-style combat using real armor and weapons. They regularly perform in renaissance fairs in across the United States, and in annual benefit shows at Bridle Trails State Park. The troupe also participates in parades, state and county fairs, and other local events.

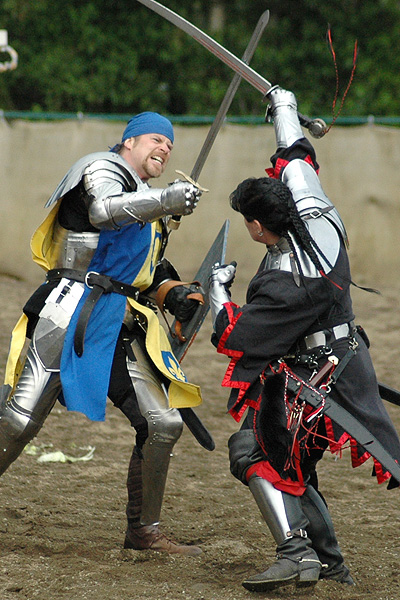
Male and Female Seattle Knights cross swords

Combat is performed by both men and women, utilizing a variety of weapons, including: spears, war hammers, axes, daggers, and swords of almost every variety. Combatants include knights, mercenaries, rogues, damsels in distress, magic wielders, elves, and a variety of monsters, depending on the needs of the story.

In the shows, equestrian wargames test the speed, courage, and horsemanship of the mounted Knights. Jousters contest in armor drawn from many different cultures and periods on a variety of breeds of horses. Warriors awaiting their turn join the audience in heckling, making wagers, and cheering on their favorites.

The more typical shows feature story lines created by Dameon Willich and Darragh Metzger, centering on the fictional land of Tír na nÓg. As the story goes, this land is entered by crossing the enchanted mists into a world existing parallel to this one. Faerie folk and humans share this world, however, not always peacefully. The ruling body in this land is referred to as the Greater Fey, who wield powers that help keep their citizens lawful. Conflicts are abated quickly by the Greater Fey and their human Triads.

A Triad is created by the Greater Fey which choose humans who have proven themselves to be strong, brave and clever. They consist of Cavaliers, the warrior-knights, Rangers, light fighters, and Mystics, wielders of magic. Each Triad is connected to a Faction, designated by a color. This storyline culminates in a tournament, where each Faction may prove its skill through combat, light horse runs, and the joust.

== Other performances ==
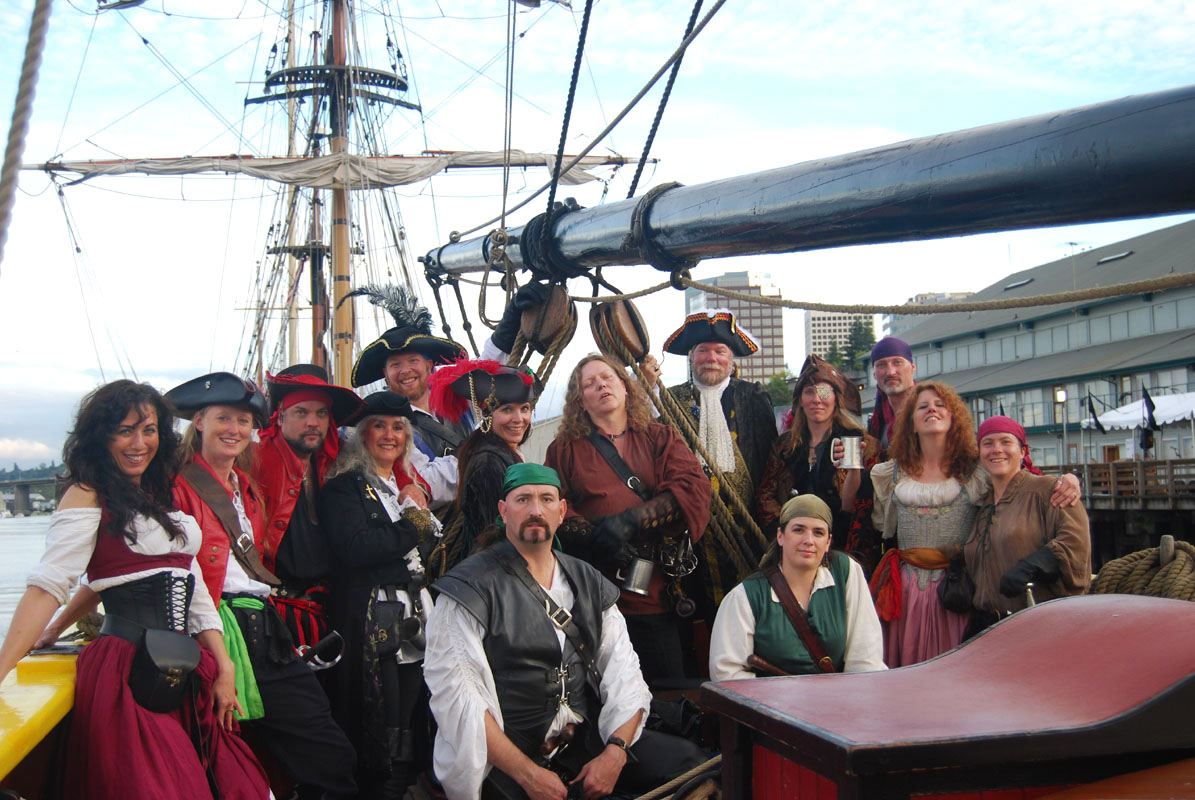
Seattle Knights as Pirates of the Puget Sound

Members of the Seattle Knights perform in two additional shows separate from their traditional medieval performances. They perform in a pirate themed show as the "Pirates of Puget Sound". The troupe also performs as the "Seattle Swashbucklers" in shows featuring a 1600-1650s theme. The fantasy-oriented folk music of "A Little Knight Music" has garnered favorable reviews across the northwest.

== Training ==
Members of the troupe meet weekly to practice and engage in mock battles. When not performing in shows, the Knights gather on weekends at private ranches in Marysville, Renton, and Hobart to practice their equestrian skills and foot combat on outdoor terrain. Members of the troupe also lead classes, available to the public, for the training of student combatants.
