= Maureen Francisco =

Filipino actress

- Born: near Manila, Philippines
- Occupations: Producer and author
- Years active: 2000–present
- Website: http://www.maureenfrancisco.com

Maureen Francisco is the executive producer of NW Productions, a media company that produces live shows and red carpet events. She is known for her role on the reality show Solitary 3.0.

== Personal life ==
Maureen Francisco came from humble beginnings. She was born in Manila, Philippines. She moved to the United States with her family at the age of 5. She attended Pacific Lutheran University and received a bachelor's degree in Journalism in 1999.

== Career ==
After she graduated, she went on to be a TV reporter around the US. In 2007, she was the first contestant on CBS's Power of 10, hosted by Drew Carey. Then in 2009, Maureen was contestant #5 on Fox Reality Channel's Solitary 3.0, where she finished in sixth place.

Today, Maureen is the executive producer of NW Productions and published author of It Takes Moxie: Off the Boat, Out of School, To Making It Your Way in America. She is also the co-founder of Beauty | Brand | Believe Expo, a confidence building workshop and The Global Beauty Awards Show that celebrates the pageant community (all systems) at the international level.
