= Seattle's True Independent Film Festival =

Film festival in Washington, United States

Seattle True Independent Film Festival (STIFF, 2005–2019) was started in 2005 by a group of filmmakers whose feature film Swamper was rejected by the Seattle International Film Festival. STIFF was modeled after the Slamdance Film Festival in Park City, Utah,as a way to champion local and true independent films that they felt were being left out of the local film program. The Stranger film critic Andrew Wright described it as “like a belch in church (in the best possible way)”. All films that screen at STIFF receive a one-of a kind award called a “STIFFY”. Past STIFFY categories run the gamut from “Best Buddy Movie”, to “Hottest Zombie”. On average, STIFF receives over 600 submissions per year and screens over 125 films as part of the nine-day event.

In 2013, STIFF announced they would go forward as The Seattle Transmedia and Independent Film Festival and, in addition to showing independent film, would include categories for new media, video games, video art, digital comics, music videos, and storytelling with emerging technologies. STIFF is Seattle's first festival devoted to exploring the new frontiers of immersive storytelling, i.e. virtual reality (VR), augmented reality (AR), and 360 degree films.

In 2015, STIFF ran a successful Kickstarter campaign to provide a Transmedia Gallery free to the public during the 2015 Festival. The gallery re-opened as the Pop-Up Shop at 5000 University Way NE, Seattle WA 98104.

STIFF was the second-largest film festival in Seattle when it operated. The festival's web site no longer functions. On Film Freeway, multiple filmmakers noted that all communication about plans for the 2020 festival ended abruptly. https://filmfreeway.com/STIFF

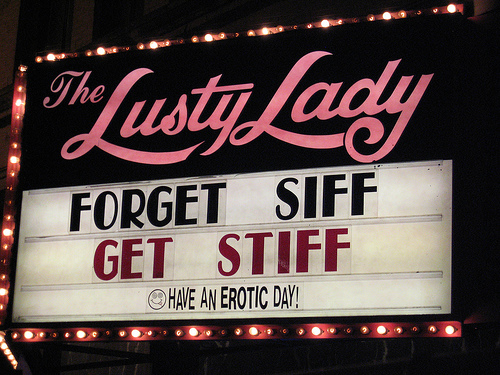

== Venues ==
STIFF took place at multiple venues throughout Seattle and strived to screen movies at unique theaters that serve food, beer, wine and alcohol during the screening. In 2012 STIFF moved to the University District screening films at the Grand Illusion, Jet City Improve Theater and Lucid Lounge. Past venues have included the Seattle Art Museum, Northwest Film Forum, The Jewel Box at The Rendezvous’, Central Cinema, The Showbox and Nuemos.

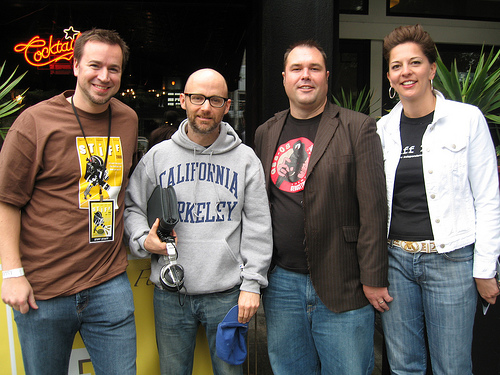
(L to R): Brian Shelley, Moby, Clint Berquist, Jessica Foss

== Music and comedy ==
The festival grew over the years to include music and comedy with performances by such notable musicians as SassyBlack (Cat, of THEESatisfaction), Metal Chocolates, DJ OCnotes, Moby and comics Emmett Montgomery, Derek Sheen & Daniel Desrosiers.

== Leadership ==
History. STIFF was the brainchild of Clint Berquist, who retired from the festival in 2010. Kevin Gilbert served as the first STIFF program director and retired after the 2007 festival concluded to focus on his acting career and Mixed Martial Arts. Program Director duties were taken over at that time by Brian Shelley who also retired in 2010. Executive Director Timothy Vernor retired from the festival in 2018.

== STIFF Nights ==
From September 2006 - 2009, STIFF began hosting a monthly screening series at Central Cinema called STIFF Nights. The goal was to feature an up-and-coming True Independent film. STIFF Nights was curated by Spencer Fornaciari screened award-winning films such as Beach Party at the Threshold of Hell, Murder Party, Blood Car, SNUFF, High Score, and Nerdcore For Life.

== HUMP! censorship flap ==
STIFF got into a censorship flap with a printer (Wright Business Graphics) when they refused to print their program on moral grounds that it had an advertisement for The Stranger's HUMP! contest. Renowned indie director, and STIFF alum Lynn Shelton has since directed a film about that contest called Humpday which was accepted into the Sundance film festival and many other festivals.
