= Lists of awards and nominations received by American actors =

Below are stand-alone lists of Film awards and nominations received by American actors.

Many actor biographies have an awards section but these are not linked here.

== A ==
- Barkhad Abdi
- F. Murray Abraham
- Amy Adams
- Ben Affleck
- Casey Affleck
- Mahershala Ali
- Woody Allen
- Gillian Anderson
- Richard Dean Anderson
- Jennifer Aniston
- Alan Arkin
- Fred Armisen
- Ed Asner
- Awkwafina

== B ==
- Lauren Bacall
- Alec Baldwin
- Christine Baranski
- Drew Barrymore
- Kim Basinger
- Angela Bassett
- Kathy Bates
- Kristen Bell
- Annette Bening
- Candice Bergen
- Halle Berry
- Beyoncé
- Karen Black
- Alexis Bledel
- Mary J. Blige
- Matt Bomer
- Chadwick Boseman
- Sônia Braga
- Marlon Brando
- Jeff Bridges
- Adrien Brody
- Josh Brolin
- Mel Brooks
- Sterling K. Brown
- Sandra Bullock
- Carol Burnett
- Ellen Burstyn
- Steve Buscemi

== C ==
- Louis C.K.
- Nicolas Cage
- Steve Carell
- Jim Carrey
- Timothée Chalamet
- Stockard Channing
- Dave Chappelle
- Jessica Chastain
- Don Cheadle
- Cher
- Patricia Clarkson
- George Clooney
- Glenn Close
- Stephen Colbert
- Frances Conroy
- Bradley Cooper
- Bill Cosby
- Miranda Cosgrove
- Kevin Costner
- Bryan Cranston
- James Cromwell
- Marcia Cross
- Tom Cruise
- Billy Crystal
- Jamie Lee Curtis
- Joan Cusack
- Miley Cyrus

== D ==
- Willem Dafoe
- Matt Damon
- Jeff Daniels
- Paul Dano
- Viola Davis
- Rosario Dawson
- Andra Day
- Doris Day
- Robert De Niro
- Ariana DeBose
- Ellen DeGeneres
- Cara Delevingne
- Danny DeVito
- Benicio del Toro
- Johnny Depp
- Laura Dern
- Cameron Diaz
- Leonardo DiCaprio
- Peter Dinklage
- Stanley Donen
- Michael Douglas
- Robert Downey Jr.
- Adam Driver
- Hilary Duff
- Faye Dunaway
- Kirsten Dunst
- Robert Duvall

== E ==
- Clint Eastwood
- Jesse Eisenberg
- Sam Elliott
- Aunjanue Ellis

== F ==
- Edie Falco
- Dakota Fanning
- Elle Fanning
- Vera Farmiga
- Mia Farrow
- Will Ferrell
- Tina Fey
- Laurence Fishburne
- Jane Fonda
- Jodie Foster
- Sutton Foster
- Megan Fox
- Jamie Foxx
- James Franco
- Dennis Franz
- Morgan Freeman

== G ==
- James Gandolfini
- Andrew Garfield
- Judy Garland
- Jennifer Garner
- Greta Gerwig
- Paul Giamatti
- Mel Gibson
- Lily Gladstone
- Danny Glover
- Donald Glover
- Whoopi Goldberg
- Selena Gomez
- John Goodman
- Joseph Gordon-Levitt
- Topher Grace
- Kelsey Grammer
- Jake Gyllenhaal
- Maggie Gyllenhaal

== H ==
- Gene Hackman
- Tiffany Haddish
- Bill Hader
- Jon Hamm
- Tom Hanks
- Marcia Gay Harden
- Woody Harrelson
- Neil Patrick Harris
- Anne Hathaway
- Ethan Hawke
- Salma Hayek
- Lucas Hedges
- Christina Hendricks
- Taraji P. Henson
- Katharine Hepburn
- Barbara Hershey
- Jonah Hill
- Dustin Hoffman
- Philip Seymour Hoffman
- Bob Hope
- Ron Howard
- Jennifer Hudson
- Kate Hudson
- Helen Hunt
- Holly Hunter
- Anjelica Huston
- David Hyde Pierce

== I ==
- Oscar Isaac

== J ==
- Samuel L. Jackson
- Thomas Jane
- Allison Janney
- Scarlett Johansson
- Dakota Johnson
- Angelina Jolie
- Cherry Jones
- James Earl Jones
- Michael B. Jordan

== K ==
- Diane Keaton
- Michael Keaton
- Catherine Keener
- Anna Kendrick
- Tom Kenny
- Regina King
- Greg Kinnear
- John Krasinski
- Lisa Kudrow
- Mila Kunis
- Ashton Kutcher

== L ==
- Shia LaBeouf
- Nathan Lane
- Jessica Lange
- Frank Langella
- Angela Lansbury
- Brie Larson
- Cyndi Lauper
- Jennifer Lawrence
- Cloris Leachman
- Matt LeBlanc
- Jack Lemmon
- Jared Leto
- Juliette Lewis
- Laura Linney
- James Lipton
- John Lithgow
- Lindsay Lohan
- Julia Louis-Dreyfus
- Courtney Love
- Patti LuPone
- Jane Lynch

== M ==
- Seth MacFarlane
- Anthony Mackie
- Shirley MacLaine
- William H. Macy
- Madonna
- Bill Maher
- Rami Malek
- Jena Malone
- Rooney Mara
- Julianna Margulies
- Steve Martin
- Marlee Matlin
- Melissa McCarthy
- Matthew McConaughey
- Audra McDonald
- Frances McDormand
- Idina Menzel
- Laurie Metcalf
- Lea Michele
- Bette Midler
- Liza Minnelli
- Janelle Monáe
- Mo'Nique
- Marilyn Monroe
- Demi Moore
- Julianne Moore
- Mandy Moore
- Mary Tyler Moore
- Rita Moreno
- Chloë Grace Moretz
- Viggo Mortensen
- Elisabeth Moss
- John Mulaney
- Megan Mullally
- Eddie Murphy
- Bill Murray

== N ==
- Paul Newman
- Jack Nicholson
- Alessandro Nivola
- Edward Norton

== O ==
- Conan O'Brien
- Bob Odenkirk
- Sandra Oh
- Denis O'Hare
- Jerry Orbach
- Jenna Ortega

== P ==
- Al Pacino
- Elliot Page
- Geraldine Page
- Keke Palmer
- Gwyneth Paltrow
- Sarah Jessica Parker
- Trey Parker
- Jim Parsons
- Sarah Paulson
- Gregory Peck
- Jordan Peele
- Rosie Perez
- Tyler Perry
- Joe Pesci
- Michelle Pfeiffer
- Joaquin Phoenix
- Chris Pine
- Brad Pitt
- Amy Poehler
- Sidney Poitier
- Natalie Portman
- Chris Pratt
- Richard Pryor

== Q ==
- Queen Latifah

== R ==
- Sara Ramirez
- Raven-Symoné
- Robert Redford
- John C. Reilly
- Carl Reiner
- Jeremy Renner
- Ryan Reynolds
- Tim Robbins
- Emma Roberts
- Julia Roberts
- Chris Rock
- Sam Rockwell
- Olivia Rodrigo
- Seth Rogen
- Saoirse Ronan
- Paul Rudd
- Mark Ruffalo
- RuPaul
- Winona Ryder

== S ==
- Safdie brothers
- Adam Sandler
- Susan Sarandon
- Amy Schumer
- Arnold Schwarzenegger
- David Schwimmer
- George C. Scott
- Chloë Sevigny
- Amanda Seyfried
- Tony Shalhoub
- Michael Shannon
- Charlie Sheen
- Martin Sheen
- Blake Shelton
- Sam Shepard
- J. K. Simmons
- Gary Sinise
- Jean Smart
- Will Smith
- Jimmy Smits
- Mira Sorvino
- Sissy Spacek
- Kevin Spacey
- James Spader
- Octavia Spencer
- Sylvester Stallone
- Sebastian Stan
- Rod Steiger
- Hailee Steinfeld
- James Stewart
- Jon Stewart
- Kristen Stewart
- Ben Stiller
- Dean Stockwell
- Emma Stone
- Matt Stone
- Sharon Stone
- Meryl Streep
- Elaine Stritch
- Jeremy Strong
- Michael Stuhlbarg

== T ==
- Channing Tatum
- Elizabeth Taylor
- Anya Taylor-Joy
- Charlize Theron
- Tessa Thompson
- Billy Bob Thornton
- Justin Timberlake
- Marisa Tomei
- Lily Tomlin
- Spencer Tracy
- John Travolta
- Stanley Tucci
- Lana Turner
- Cicely Tyson

== U ==
- Tracey Ullman
- Carrie Underwood
- Gabrielle Union

== V ==
- Dick Van Dyke

== W ==
- Mark Wahlberg
- Christopher Walken
- Sela Ward
- Denzel Washington
- Kerry Washington
- Sam Waterston
- Sigourney Weaver
- Forest Whitaker
- Betty White
- Bradley Whitford
- Dianne Wiest
- Kristen Wiig
- Michael K. Williams
- Michelle Williams
- Robin Williams
- Vanessa Williams
- Bruce Willis
- Owen Wilson
- Oprah Winfrey
- Henry Winkler
- Mare Winningham
- Reese Witherspoon
- Elijah Wood
- Evan Rachel Wood
- Alfre Woodard
- Shailene Woodley
- James Woods
- Joanne Woodward
- Robin Wright

== Z ==
- Renée Zellweger
- Zendaya
