= List of awards and nominations received by Gabrielle Union =

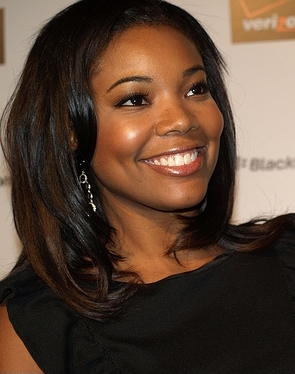
Union at the San Francisco Blackberry Storm Party in 2009.

This is the list of awards and nominations received by American actress Gabrielle Union.

== Awards and nominations ==
=== Academy of Science Fiction, Fantasy & Horror Films ===
Year	Category	Work	Result
2004	Cinescape Genre Face of the Future Award Female	Cradle 2 the Grave and Bad Boys II	Nominated

=== American Black Film Festival ===
Year	Category	Work	Result
2003	Rising Star Award	Herself	Won

=== Behind the Voice Actors Awards ===
Year	Category	Work	Result
2016	BTVA Special/DVD Voice Acting Award Best Vocal Ensemble in a TV Special/Direct-to-DVD Title or Theatrical Short	The Lion Guard: Return of the Roar (Shared with: Max Charles Joshua Rush Atticus Shaffer Diamond White Dusan Brown Rob Lowe Khary Payton Andrew Kishino Eden Riegel)	Nominated

=== BET Awards ===
Year	Category	Work	Result
2017	Best Actress	The Birth of a Nation	Nominated
2016	Best Actress	Being Mary Jane	Nominated
2015	Best Actress	Top Five, With This Ring, Being Mary Jane and Think Like a Man Too	Nominated
2014	Best Actress	Being Mary Jane	Nominated
2013	Best Actress	In Our Nature and Think Like a Man	Nominated
2005	Best Actress	Breakin' All the Rules and Something the Lord Made	Nominated
2004	Best Actress	Bad Boys II	Nominated
2003	Best Actress	Cradle 2 the Grave and Deliver Us from Eva	Nominated

=== BET Comedy Awards ===
Year	Category	Work	Result
2005	Outstanding Lead Actress in a Theatrical Film	The Honeymooners	Nominated
2004	Outstanding Lead Actress in a Box Office Movie	Deliver Us from Eva	Won
2004	Outstanding Lead Actress in a Box Office Movie	Breakin' All the Rules	Nominated

=== Black Reel Awards ===
Year	Category	Work	Result
2014	Outstanding Actress, TV Movie or Mini-Series	Being Mary Jane	Nominated
2005	Best Actress, Musical or Comedy	Breakin' All the Rules	Nominated
2005	Best Supporting Actress, Network/Cable Television	Something the Lord Made	Nominated
2004	Best Actress	Deliver Us from Eva	Nominated
2002	Theatrical - Best Supporting Actress	The Brothers	Nominated
2001	Theatrical - Best Supporting Actress	Bring It On	Won

=== SILVER Derby Awards ===
Year	Category	Work	Result
2004	TV Movie/Mini Supporting Actress	Something the Lord Made	Nominated

=== Independent Spirit Awards ===
Year	Category	Work	Result
2023	Best Supporting Performance	The Inspection	Nominated

=== NAACP Image Awards ===
Year	Category	Work	Result
2016	Outstanding Actress in a Drama Series	Being Mary Jane	Nominated
2015	Outstanding Actress in a Drama Series	Being Mary Jane	Nominated
2014	Outstanding Actress in a Television Movie, Mini-Series or Dramatic Special	Being Mary Jane	Won
2010	Outstanding Supporting Actress in a Drama Series	FlashForward	Nominated
2005	Outstanding Actress in a Television Movie, Mini-Series or Dramatic Special	Something the Lord Made	Nominated
2005	Outstanding Actress in a Motion Picture	Breakin' All the Rules	Nominated
2004	Outstanding Actress in a Motion Picture	Deliver Us from Eva	Nominated
2004	Outstanding Supporting Actress in a Motion Picture	Bad Boys II	Nominated
2023	President's Award	Gabrielle Union & Dwyane Wade	Won

=== NAMIC Vision Awards ===
Year	Category	Work	Result
2017	Best Performance - Drama	Being Mary Jane	Nominated

=== Nickelodeon Kids' Choice Awards ===
Year	Category	Work	Result
2026	Favorite Female Animated Voice from a Movie	Goat	Pending

=== Palm Beach International Film Festival ===
Year	Category	Work	Result
2006	Best Actress	Neo Ned	Won

=== Teen Choice Awards ===
Year	Category	Work	Result
2019	Choice Action TV Actress	L.A.'s Finest	Won

=== Young Hollywood Awards ===
Year	Category	Work	Result
2001	One to Watch Female	Herself	Won
