= List of awards and nominations received by Greg Kinnear =

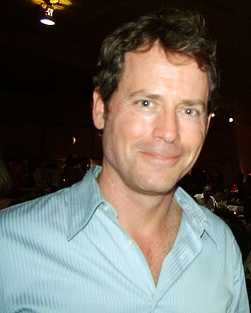
Kinnear in 2006

Greg Kinnear is an American actor, producer and television personality. He was nominated for an Academy Award, Golden Globe Award, and Screen Actors Guild Award for his role in As Good as It Gets (1997). He also received two Primetime Emmy Award nominations.

Kinnear has appeared in many popular films, including Sabrina (1995), You've Got Mail (1998), Nurse Betty (2000), Someone like You (2001), We Were Soldiers, Auto Focus (both 2002), Stuck on You (2003), Robots (2005), Little Miss Sunshine, Invincible (both 2006), Green Zone, The Last Song (both 2010), Heaven Is for Real (2014), Misbehaviour (2020) and television roles, such as Friends, Talk Soup, Modern Family, House of Cards, Rake, and the miniseries The Stand (2020). Kinnear has portrayed John F. Kennedy in The Kennedys (2011), and Joe Biden in Confirmation (2016).

== Major associations ==
=== Academy Awards ===
Year	Category	Nominated work	Result	Ref.
1997	Best Supporting Actor	As Good as it Gets	Nominated	

=== Primetime Emmy Awards ===
Year	Category	Nominated work	Result	Ref.
2011	Outstanding Lead Actor in a Limited Series	The Kennedys	Nominated	
2012	Outstanding Guest Actor in a Comedy Series	Modern Family	Nominated	

=== Daytime Emmy Awards ===
Year	Category	Nominated work	Result	Ref.
1995	Outstanding Special Programming	Talk Soup	Won	
1996	Outstanding Special Programming	Talk Soup	Nominated	

=== Golden Globe Awards ===
Year	Category	Nominated work	Result	Ref.
1997	Best Supporting Actor - Motion Picture	As Good as it Gets	Nominated	

=== Screen Actors Guild Awards ===
Year	Category	Nominated work	Result	Ref.
1997	Outstanding Ensemble Cast in a Motion Picture	As Good as it Gets	Nominated	
2006	Outstanding Ensemble Cast in a Motion Picture	Little Miss Sunshine	Won	
2011	Outstanding Actor in a Miniseries or Movie	The Kennedys	Nominated	

== Miscellaneous awards ==
Year	Association	Category	Nominated work	Results	Ref.
1994	CableACE Awards	Recreation and Leisure Special or Series	Talk Soup on Vacation	Nominated	
1994	CableACE Awards	Talk Soup: Weekend Edition	Magazine Show Special or Series	Nominated	
1995	CableACE Awards	Entertainment Host	Talk Soup	Nominated	
1996	Chicago Film Critics Association Awards	Most Promising Actor	Sabrina	Won	
1996	Golden Apple Awards	Male Discovery of the Year	N/A	Won	
1996	ShoWest Convention Awards	Male Star of Tomorrow	N/A	Won	
1997	National Board of Review Awards	Best Supporting Actor	As Good as It Gets	Won	
1997	Chicago Film Critics Association Awards	Best Supporting Actor	As Good as It Gets	Nominated	
1997	OFTA Film Awards	Best Supporting Actor	As Good as It Gets	Nominated	
1997	Satellite Awards	Best Supporting Actor in a Motion Picture, Comedy or Musical	As Good as It Gets	Nominated	
1997	Southeastern Film Critics Association	Best Supporting Actor	As Good as It Gets	Won	
1999	Blockbuster Entertainment Awards	Favorite Supporting Actor – Comedy / Romance	You've Got Mail	Won	
2002	New York Film Critics Circle Awards	Best Actor	Auto Focus	Nominated	
2005	St. Louis Film Critics Association	Best Supporting Actor	The Matador	Nominated	
2006	Gotham Independent Film Awards	Best Ensemble Performance	Little Miss Sunshine	Nominated	
2006	Phoenix Film Critics Society Awards	Best Ensemble Cast	Little Miss Sunshine	Won	
2006	Central Ohio Film Critics Association	Best Ensemble	Little Miss Sunshine	Nominated	
2008	Boston Film Festival	Best Actor	Flash of Genius	Won	
2014	MTV Movie + TV Awards	Best Fight	Anchorman 2: The Legend Continues	Nominated	
2017	Leo Awards	Best Motion Picture	Phil	Nominated	
