= List of awards and nominations received by Chris Pine =

Chris Pine awards and nominations
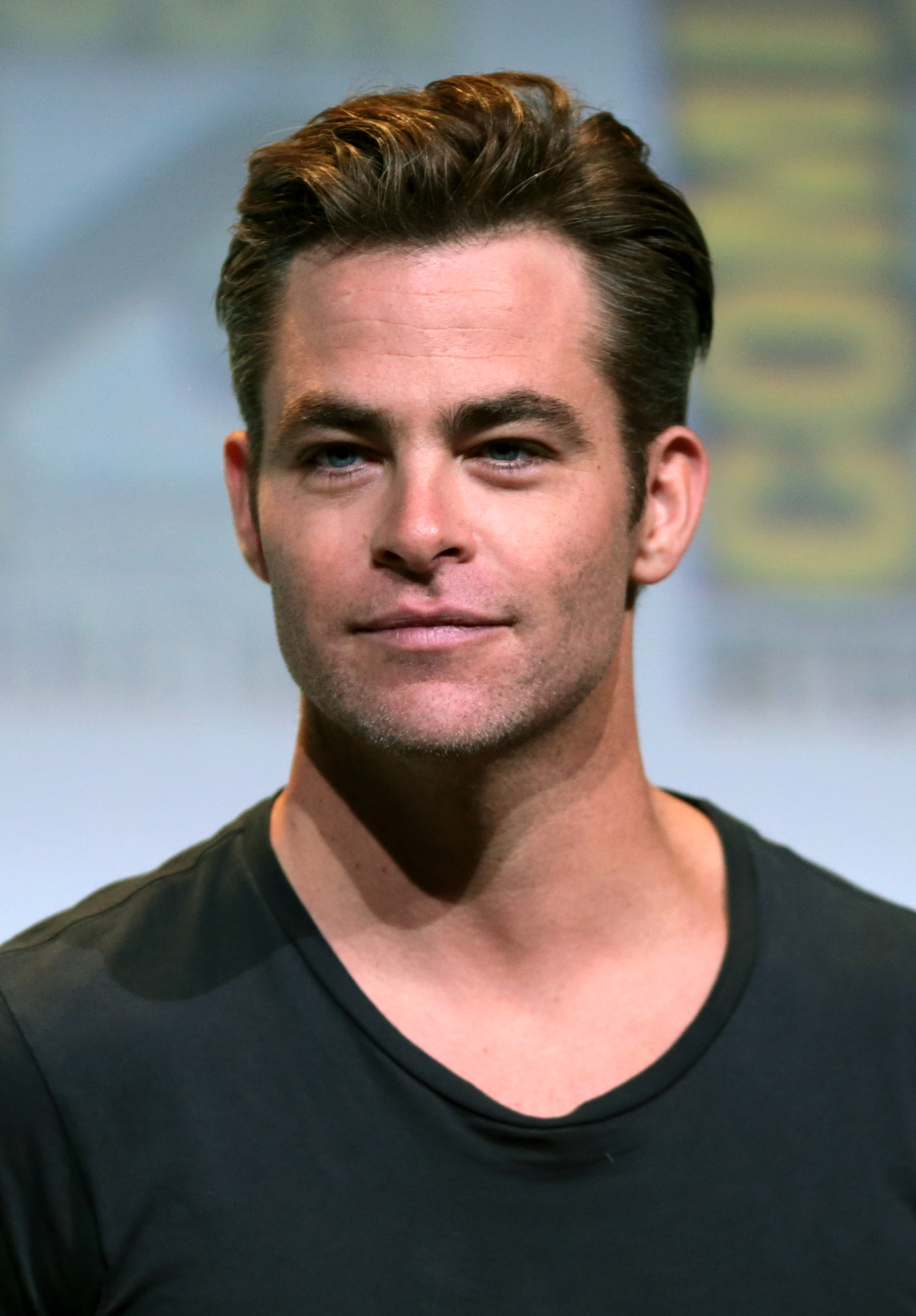
- Pine at the 2016 San Diego Comic-Con
Awards and nominations
Award	Wins	Nominations
Critics' Choice Movie Awards	0	1
Primetime Emmy Awards	0	1
People's Choice Awards	0	3
Satellite Awards	1	2

Totals (Note: Certain award groups do not simply award one winner. They acknowledge several different recipients, have runners-up, and have third place. Since this is a specific recognition and is different from losing an award, runner-up mentions are considered wins in this award tally. For simplification and to avoid errors, each award in this list has been presumed to have had a prior nomination.)
- Wins: 9
- Nominations: 35

The following is a list of awards and nominations received by American actor Chris Pine throughout his career.

== Awards and nominations ==
Year	Award	Category	Work	Result	Ref.
2009	Ovation Award	Lead Actor in a Play	Farragut North	Nominated	
2009	ShoWest Award	Male Star of Tomorrow	—N/a	Won	
2009	Boston Society of Film Critics Awards	Best Ensemble Cast	Star Trek	Won (Note: Tied with Precious.)	
2009	Washington D.C. Area Film Critics Association Award	Best Ensemble (with cast)	Star Trek	Nominated	
2009	Teen Choice Awards	Choice Movie Fresh Face Male	Star Trek	Nominated	
2009	Teen Choice Awards	Choice Movie Rumble (with Zachary Quinto)	Star Trek	Nominated	
2009	Scream Award	Best Actor in a Science Fiction Movie or TV Show	Star Trek	Won	
2009	Detroit Film Critics Society Award	Breakthrough Performance	Star Trek	Nominated	
2009	Detroit Film Critics Society Award	Best Ensemble (with cast)	Star Trek	Nominated	
2010	Critics' Choice Movie Awards	Best Acting Ensemble	Star Trek	Nominated	
2010	Broadcast Film Critics Association Award	Best Acting Ensemble (with cast)	Star Trek	Nominated	
2010	People's Choice Awards	Favorite Breakout Movie Actor	Star Trek	Nominated	
2010	MTV Movie Award	Best Breakout Star	Star Trek	Nominated	
2010	MTV Movie Award	Biggest Badass Star	Star Trek	Nominated	
2010	Los Angeles Drama Critics Circle Award	Lead Performance	The Lieutenant of Inishmore	Won	
2012	Teen Choice Award	Choice Movie Actor: Romance	This Means War	Nominated	
2013	Teen Choice Award	Choice Summer Movie Star: Male	Star Trek Into Darkness	Nominated	
2013	CinemaCon Award	Male Star of the Year	—N/a	Won	
2014	Satellite Award	Best Ensemble – Motion Picture (with cast)	Into the Woods	Won	
2014	Detroit Film Critics Society Award	Best Ensemble (with cast)	Into the Woods	Nominated	
2014	People's Choice Award	Favorite Movie Duo (with Zachary Quinto)	Star Trek Into Darkness	Nominated	
2016	Primetime Emmy Awards	Outstanding Character Voice-Over Performance	SuperMansion	Nominated	
2016	Broadcast Film Critics Association Award	Best Acting Ensemble (with cast)	Hell or High Water	Nominated	
2016	Detroit Film Critics Society Award	Best Ensemble (with cast)	Hell or High Water	Nominated	
2016	San Diego Film Critics Society	Best Actor	Hell or High Water	Nominated	
2016	San Diego Film Critics Society	Best Ensemble(with cast)	Hell or High Water	Won	
2016	Washington D.C. Area Film Critics Association Award	Best Ensemble (with cast)	Hell or High Water	Won	
2016	Teen Choice Awards	Choice Movie Actor: AnTEENcipated	Star Trek Beyond	Nominated	
2017	People's Choice Awards	Favorite Dramatic Movie Actor	The Finest Hours / Hell or High Water	Nominated	
2017	Jupiter Award	Best International Actor	Star Trek Beyond	Nominated	
2017	Saturn Award	Best Actor	Star Trek Beyond	Nominated	
2017	Teen Choice Awards	Choice Action Movie Actor	Wonder Woman	Won	
2018	Saturn Awards	Best Supporting Actor	Wonder Woman	Nominated	
2019	Satellite Awards	Best Actor in a Miniseries & Limited Series or a Motion Picture Made for Television	I Am the Night	Nominated	
2021	Nickelodeon Kids' Choice Awards	Favorite Movie Actor	Wonder Woman 1984	Nominated	
