= List of awards and nominations received by Thomas Jane =

List of Thomas Jane awards
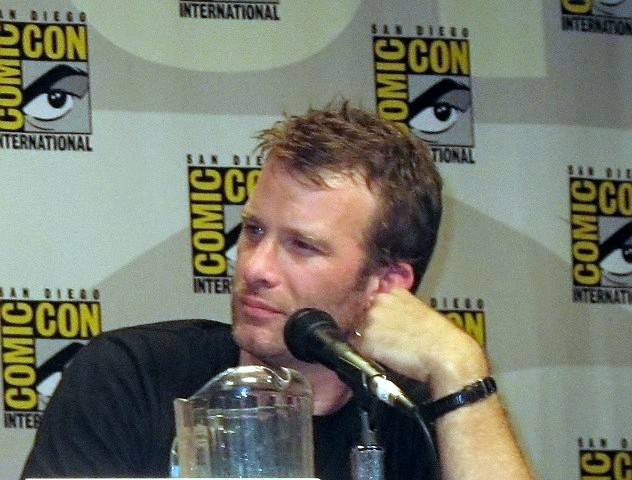
- Jane at the 2007 Comic-Con
Award	Wins	Nominations
Golden Globe Awards	0	3
Florida Film Critics Circle Awards	1	1
Screen Actors Guild Awards	0	1
Shorty Awards	0	1
Overall	1	6

The following is a list of awards and nominations received by Thomas Jane throughout his acting career.

== Nominations and wins ==
=== Florida Film Critics Circle Awards ===
Year	Category	Film	Result
1998	Florida Film Critics Circle Awards for Best Ensemble Cast	Boogie Nights	Won (Note: Shared with Don Cheadle, Heather Graham, Luis Guzmán, Philip Baker Hall, Philip Seymour Hoffman, Ricky Jay, William H. Macy, Alfred Molina, Julianne Moore, Nicole Ari Parker, John C. Reilly, Burt Reynolds, Robert Ridgely, Mark Wahlberg, and Melora Walters)

=== Golden Globe Awards ===
Year	Category	Film/TV Series	Result
2010	Golden Globe Award for Best Actor in a Television Series – Musical or Comedy	Hung	Nominated
2011	Golden Globe Award for Best Actor in a Television Series – Musical or Comedy	Hung	Nominated
2012	Golden Globe Award for Best Actor in a Television Series – Musical or Comedy	Hung	Nominated

=== SAG Awards ===
Year	Category	Film/TV Series	Result
1998	Screen Actors Guild Award for Outstanding Performance by a Cast in a Motion Picture	Boogie Nights	Nominated

=== Satellite Awards ===
Year	Category	Film/TV Series	Result
2010	Best Actor in a Series, Comedy or Musical	Hung	Nominated

=== Shorty Awards ===
Year	Category	Film	Result
2012	Actor	—N/a	Nominated
