= List of awards and nominations received by Jerry Orbach =

List of Jerry Orbach awards
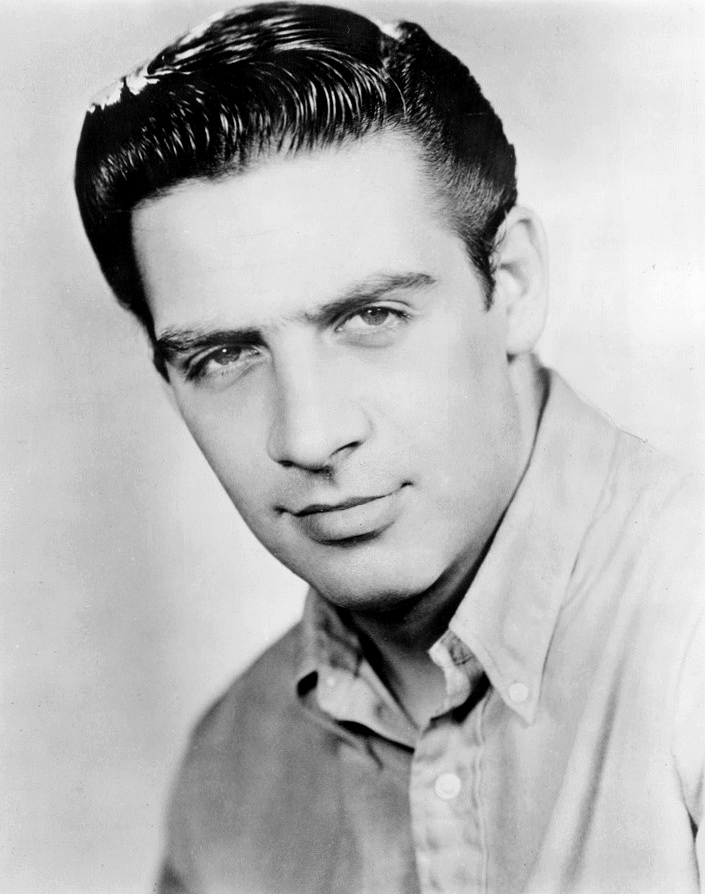
- Orbach in 1965
Award	Wins	Nominations
Emmy Awards	0	3
Tony Awards	1	3
Grammy Awards	0	1
Screen Actors Guild Awards	1	10

Jerry Orbach was an American actor of the stage and screen.

For his stage work he received three Tony Award nominations. His first nomination was for Best Featured Actor in a Musical for Guys and Dolls in 1965. He won the Tony Award for Best Actor in a Musical for his performance in Promises, Promises in 1969. He received his third nomination for Best Actor in a Musical for his role in Chicago in 1975. He received a Grammy Award for Album of the Year for Beauty and the Beast (1991).

He received three Primetime Emmy Award nominations for his work on The Golden Girls in 1990, Broadway Bound in 1992 and Law & Order in 2000. He also received nine Screen Actors Guild Award nominations for Outstanding Performance by an Ensemble in a Drama Series for Law and Order. He won for Screen Actors Guild Award for Outstanding Performance by a Male Actor in a Drama Series in 2004.

For his film performances he received critical attention and nominations for his role in Sidney Lumet's Prince of the City (1981). This includes nominations from the National Society of Film Critics, and the New York Film Critics Circle.

== Major associations ==
=== Primetime Emmy Awards ===
Year	Category	Nominated work	Result	Ref.
1990	Outstanding Guest Actor in a Comedy Series	The Golden Girls	Nominated	
1992	Outstanding Supporting Actor in a Miniseries or a Special	Broadway Bound	Nominated	
2000	Outstanding Lead Actor in a Drama Series	Law & Order	Nominated	

=== Tony Awards ===
Year	Category	Nominated work	Result	Ref.
1965	Best Supporting or Featured Actor in a Musical	Guys and Dolls	Nominated	
1969	Best Leading Actor in a Musical	Promises, Promises	Won	
1976	Best Leading Actor in a Musical	Chicago	Nominated	

=== Grammy Awards ===
Year	Category	Nominated work	Result	Ref.
1993	Album of the Year	Beauty and the Beast	Nominated	

=== Screen Actors Guild Awards ===
Year	Category	Nominated work	Result	Ref.
1994	Outstanding Ensemble in a Drama Series	Law & Order	Nominated	
1995	Outstanding Ensemble in a Drama Series	Law & Order	Nominated	
1996	Outstanding Ensemble in a Drama Series	Law & Order	Nominated	
1997	Outstanding Ensemble in a Drama Series	Law & Order	Nominated	
1998	Outstanding Ensemble in a Drama Series	Law & Order	Nominated	
1999	Outstanding Ensemble in a Drama Series	Law & Order	Nominated	
2000	Outstanding Ensemble in a Drama Series	Law & Order	Nominated	
2001	Outstanding Ensemble in a Drama Series	Law & Order	Nominated	
2003	Outstanding Ensemble in a Drama Series	Law & Order	Nominated	
2004	Outstanding Male Actor in a Drama Series	Law & Order	Won	

== Miscellaneous awards ==
Year	Category	Nominated work	Result	Ref.
1981	National Society of Film Critics Award	Best Supporting Actor	Prince of the City	Nominated
1981	New York Film Critics Circle Award	Best Supporting Actor	Prince of the City	Nominated
1997	Online Film & Television Association	Best Supporting Actor in a Drama Series	Law and Order	Nominated
2005	TV Land Awards	Favorite Casual Friday Cop	Law and Order	Nominated
2006	TV Land Awards	Coolest Crime Fighting Team	Law and Order	Nominated
1998	Viewers for Quality Television Awards	Best Supporting Actor in a Drama Series	Law and Order	Nominated
1999	Viewers for Quality Television Awards	Best Supporting Actor in a Drama Series	Law and Order	Nominated
2000	Viewers for Quality Television Awards	Best Supporting Actor in a Drama Series	Law and Order	Nominated
