= List of awards and nominations received by Megan Mullally =

Megan Mullally awards and nominations
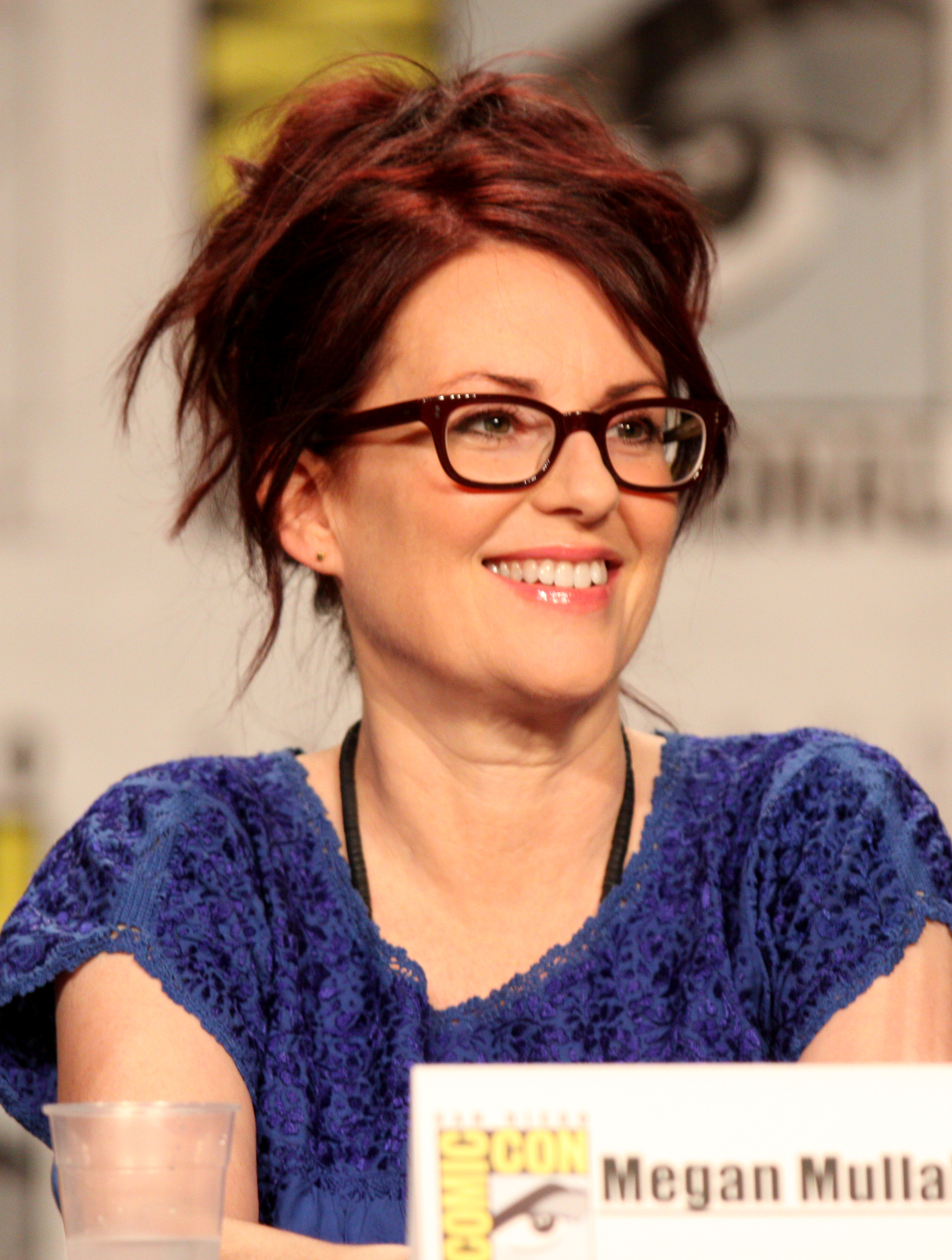
- Mullally at San Diego Comic-Con in July 2011
Awards and nominations
Award	Wins	Nominations
Golden Globe	0	4
Emmy Awards	2	9
Screen Actors Guild Awards	4	12

Totals (Note: Certain award groups do not simply award one winner. They acknowledge several different recipients, have runners-up, and have third place. Since this is a specific recognition and is different from losing an award, runner-up mentions are considered wins in this award tally. For simplification and to avoid errors, each award in this list has been presumed to have had a prior nomination.)
- Wins: 7
- Nominations: 30

The following is a list of awards and nominations received by actress Megan Mullally.

== Awards and nominations ==
=== Daytime Emmy Awards ===
Year	Category	Nominated work	Result
2015	Outstanding Performer in an Animated Program	Sofia the First (episode: "The Enchanted Feast")	Nominated

=== Golden Globe Awards ===
Year	Category	Nominated work	Result
2001	Best Supporting Actress – Series, Miniseries or Motion Picture Made for Television	Will & Grace	Nominated
2002	Best Supporting Actress – Series, Miniseries or Motion Picture Made for Television	Will & Grace	Nominated
2003	Best Supporting Actress – Series, Miniseries or Motion Picture Made for Television	Will & Grace	Nominated
2004	Best Supporting Actress – Series, Miniseries or Motion Picture Made for Television	Will & Grace	Nominated

=== Primetime Emmy Awards ===
Year	Category	Nominated work	Result
2000	Outstanding Supporting Actress in a Comedy Series	Will & Grace	Won
2001	Outstanding Supporting Actress in a Comedy Series	Will & Grace	Nominated
2002	Outstanding Supporting Actress in a Comedy Series	Will & Grace	Nominated
2003	Outstanding Supporting Actress in a Comedy Series	Will & Grace	Nominated
2004	Outstanding Supporting Actress in a Comedy Series	Will & Grace	Nominated
2005	Outstanding Supporting Actress in a Comedy Series	Will & Grace	Nominated
2006	Outstanding Supporting Actress in a Comedy Series	Will & Grace	Won
2018	Outstanding Supporting Actress in a Comedy Series	Will & Grace	Nominated

=== Screen Actors Guild Awards ===
Year	Category	Nominated work	Result
2001	Outstanding Ensemble in a Comedy Series	Will & Grace	Won
2001	Outstanding Female Actor in a Comedy Series	Will & Grace	Nominated
2002	Outstanding Female Actor in a Comedy Series	Will & Grace	Won
2002	Outstanding Ensemble in a Comedy Series	Will & Grace	Nominated
2003	Outstanding Ensemble in a Comedy Series	Will & Grace	Nominated
2003	Outstanding Female Actor in a Comedy Series	Will & Grace	Won
2004	Outstanding Female Actor in a Comedy Series	Will & Grace	Won
2004	Outstanding Ensemble in a Comedy Series	Will & Grace	Nominated
2005	Outstanding Ensemble in a Comedy Series	Will & Grace	Nominated
2005	Outstanding Female Actor in a Comedy Series	Will & Grace	Nominated
2006	Outstanding Female Actor in a Comedy Series	Will & Grace	Nominated
2007	Outstanding Female Actor in a Comedy Series	Will & Grace	Nominated

=== Miscelleanous awards ===
Year	Award	Category	Nominated work	Result
1987	Young Artist Awards	Best Young Actress in a New Television Comedy or Drama Series	The Ellen Burstyn Show	Nominated
2002	Teen Choice Awards	Choice TV Comedy Actress	Will & Grace	Nominated
2005	People’s Choice Awards	Favorite Female TV Performer	Will & Grace	Nominated
2008	Broadway.com Audience Awards	Favorite Featured Actress in a Broadway Musical	Young Frankenstein	Won
2018	Gold Derby Awards	Best Comedy Supporting Actress	Will & Grace	Nominated
