= List of awards and nominations received by Barbara Hershey =

List of Barbara Hershey's awards
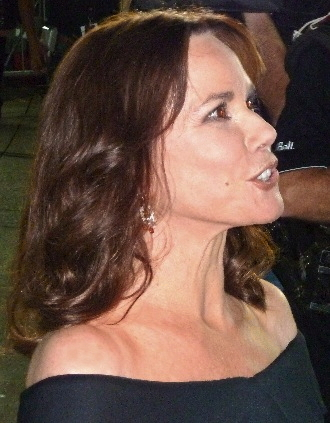
- Hershey at the Toronto International Film Festival, September 13, 2010
Award	Wins	Nominations
Academy Awards	0	1
BAFTA Awards	0	2
Golden Globe Awards	1	3
Primetime Emmy Awards	1	2
Screen Actors Guild Awards	0	1

The following is a list of awards and nominations received by Barbara Hershey.

Throughout Hershey's acting career, she has been nominated for an Academy Award for Best Supporting Actress for the 1996 film The Portrait of a Lady, received three Golden Globe nominations and two Primetime Emmy Award nominations. She won a Golden Globe for Best Actress in a Miniseries or TV Film and a Primetime Emmy Award for Outstanding Lead Actress in a Miniseries or Movie for the 1990 TV film A Killing in a Small Town. At the Cannes Film Festival, Hershey became the first actress to receive back-to-back Best Actress awards, winning for Shy People in 1987 and A World Apart in 1988.

In 2010, a resurgence in her career took place when she co-starred as The Queen in Black Swan. Hershey was nominated for her second BAFTA Award for Best Actress in a Supporting Role; and along with the cast of the film, was nominated for her first Screen Actors Guild Award for Outstanding Performance by a Cast in a Motion Picture.

== Major associations ==
=== Academy Awards ===
Year	Nominated work	Category	Result
1997	The Portrait of a Lady	Best Supporting Actress	Nominated

=== BAFTA Awards ===
Year	Nominated work	Category	Result
1987	Hannah and Her Sisters	Best Actress in a Supporting Role	Nominated
2011	Black Swan	Best Actress in a Supporting Role	Nominated

=== Golden Globe Awards ===
Year	Nominated work	Category	Result
1989	The Last Temptation of Christ	Best Supporting Actress – Motion Picture	Nominated
1991	A Killing in a Small Town	Best Actress – Miniseries or Television Film	Won
1997	The Portrait of a Lady	Best Supporting Actress – Motion Picture	Nominated

=== Primetime Emmy Awards ===
Year	Nominated work	Category	Result
1990	A Killing in a Small Town	Outstanding Lead Actress in a Limited or Anthology Series or Movie	Won
1991	Paris Trout	Outstanding Lead Actress in a Limited or Anthology Series or Movie	Nominated

=== Screen Actors Guild Awards ===
Year	Nominated work	Category	Result
2011	Black Swan	Outstanding Performance by a Cast in a Motion Picture	Nominated

== Industry awards ==
=== Fangoria Chainsaw Awards ===
Year	Nominated work	Category	Result
2011	Black Swan	Best Supporting Actress	Won

=== Satellite Awards ===
Year	Nominated work	Category	Result
1999	The Staircase	Best Actress – Miniseries or Television Film	Nominated

== Major festival awards ==
=== Cannes Film Festival ===
Year	Nominated work	Category	Result
1987	Shy People	Best Actress	Won
1988	A World Apart	Best Actress	Won

== Critics awards ==
=== Chicago Film Critics Association Awards ===
Year	Nominated work	Category	Result
1989	Shy People	Best Actress	Won
1997	The Portrait of a Lady	Best Supporting Actress	Nominated

=== Los Angeles Film Critics Association Awards ===
Year	Nominated work	Category	Result
1996	The Portrait of a Lady	Best Supporting Actress	Won

=== National Society of Film Critics Awards ===
Year	Nominated work	Category	Result
1987	Hannah and Her Sisters	Best Supporting Actress	Nominated
1989	A World Apart	Best Actress	Nominated
1997	The Portrait of a Lady	Best Supporting Actress	Won

=== New York Film Critics Circle Awards ===
Year	Nominated work	Category	Result
1996	The Portrait of a Lady	Best Supporting Actress	Nominated
