= List of awards and nominations received by Danny DeVito =

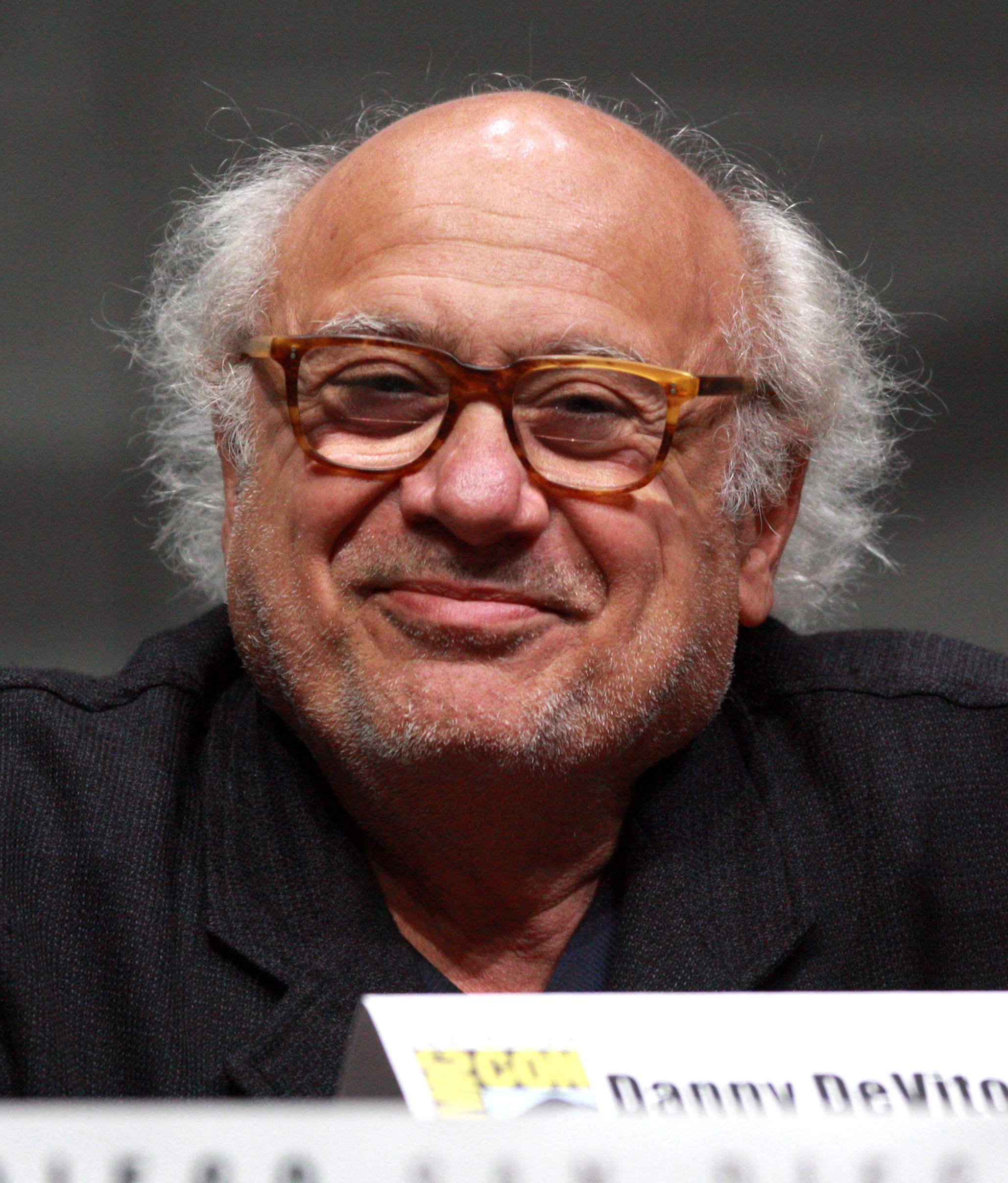
DeVito at San Diego Comic-Con in 2013

Danny DeVito has a large and varied body of work as an actor, producer and director in stage, television and film.

He has received a Primetime Emmy Award and a Golden Globe Award as well as nominations for an Academy Award, a Producers Guild Awards, two Screen Actors Guild Awards and Tony Award. In 2011 he was honored with a star on the Hollywood Walk of Fame, at 6909 Hollywood Blvd., for his contributions to television.

== Major associations ==
=== Academy Awards ===
Year	Category	Nominated work	Result	Ref.
2001	Best Picture	Erin Brockovich	Nominated	

=== BAFTA Awards ===
Year	Category	Nominated work	Result	Ref.
2001	Best Film	Erin Brockovich	Nominated	

=== Emmy Awards ===
Year	Category	Nominated work	Result	Ref.
1979	Outstanding Supporting Actor in a Comedy Series	Taxi	Nominated	
1981	Outstanding Supporting Actor in a Comedy Series	Taxi	Won	
1982	Outstanding Supporting Actor in a Comedy Series	Taxi	Nominated	
1983	Outstanding Supporting Actor in a Comedy Series	Taxi	Nominated	
2004	Outstanding Guest Actor in a Comedy Series	Friends	Nominated	

=== Golden Globe Awards ===
Year	Category	Nominated work	Result	Ref.
1979	Best Supporting Actor - Television	Taxi	Nominated	
1980	Best Supporting Actor - Television	Taxi	Won	
1981	Best Supporting Actor - Television	Taxi	Nominated	
1987	Best Actor - Motion Picture Musical or Comedy	Ruthless People	Nominated	
1988	Best Actor - Motion Picture Musical or Comedy	Throw Momma from the Train	Nominated	

=== Screen Actors Guild Award ===
Year	Category	Nominated work	Result	Ref.
1996	Outstanding Cast in a Motion Picture	Get Shorty	Nominated	
1998	Outstanding Cast in a Motion Picture	L.A. Confidential	Nominated	

=== Tony Awards ===
Year	Category	Nominated work	Result	Ref.
2017	Best Featured Actor	The Price	Nominated	

== Miscellaneous awards ==
=== American Comedy Award ===
- 1987 - Funniest Lead Actor in a Motion Picture - Ruthless People - nominee
- 1988 - Funniest Lead Actor in a Motion Picture - Throw Momma from the Train - nominee

=== Broadway.com Audience Award ===
- 2024 - Favorite Leading Actor in a Play - I Need That - nominee
- 2024 - Favorite Funny Performance - I Need That - nominee

=== Golden Berlin Award ===
- 1990 - Golden Berlin Bear - The War of the Roses - nominee

=== Golden Raspberry Award ===
- 1982 - Golden Raspberry Award for Worst Supporting Actor - Going Ape! - nominee
- 1991 - Golden Raspberry Award for Worst Director - Hoffa - nominee
- 1992 - Golden Raspberry Award for Worst Supporting Actor - Batman Returns - nominee
- 2007 - Golden Raspberry Award for Worst Supporting Actor - Deck the Halls - nominee

=== MTV Movie Award ===
- 1992 - MTV Movie Award for Best Villain - Batman Returns - nominee

=== Online Film & Television Award ===
- 1997 - Best Sci-Fi/Fantasy/Horror Picture - Gattaca - nominee
- 1997 - Best Comedy/Musical Picture - Wag the Dog - nominee
- 1997 - Best Voice-Over Performance - Hercules - nominee
- 2000 - Best Picture - Erin Brokovich - nominee

=== Producers Guild of America Award ===
- 2000 - Best Theatrical Motion Picture - Erin Brokovich - nominee

=== Satellite Award ===
- 1996 - Best Supporting Actor in a Motion Picture - Musical or Comedy - Matilda - nominee
- 1997 - Satellite Award for Best Supporting Actor in a Motion Picture - Drama - The Rainmaker - nominee
- 2008 - Best Actor in a Television Series - Musical or Comedy - It's Always Sunny in Philadelphia - nominee

=== Saturn Award ===
- 1992 - Saturn Award for Best Supporting Actor - Batman Returns - nominee

=== Tribeca Film Festival ===
- 2016 - Tribeca Film Festival Award for Best Narrative Short - Curmudgeons - nominee

=== TV Land Award ===
- 2004 - TV Land Award for Bossiest Boss - Taxi - winner
- 2004 - TV Land Medallion Award - Taxi - winner

== Other awards ==
Year	Title	Accolade	Results
1985	CableACE Award for Actor in a Movie or Miniseries	The Ratings Game	Nominated
1989	ShoWest Convention Award for Male Star of the Year	Throw Momma from the Train	Won
1996	Cinekid Audience Award	Matilda	Won
1996	Sitges - Catalonian International Film Festival Award for Best Film	Matilda	Nominated
1997	Oulu International Children's Film Festival Starboy Award	Matilda	Won
1998	Blockbuster Entertainment Award for Favorite Supporting Actor - Drama	The Rainmaker	Nominated
1999	Chlotrudis Award for Best Actor	Living Out Loud	Nominated

== Honorary awards ==
Year	Accolade	Results
2007	Karlovy Vary International Film Festival Special Prize for Outstanding Contribution to World Cinema	Won
2010	Golden Camera Award for Lifetime Achievement - International	Won
2011	Critics Choice Television Icon Award	Won
2017	Frameline San Francisco International LGBTQ Film Festival Award for Best Short Film	Won
2018	San Sebastián International Film Festival Lifetime Achievement Award	Won
