= List of awards and nominations received by Tiffany Haddish =

Tiffany Haddish awards and nominations
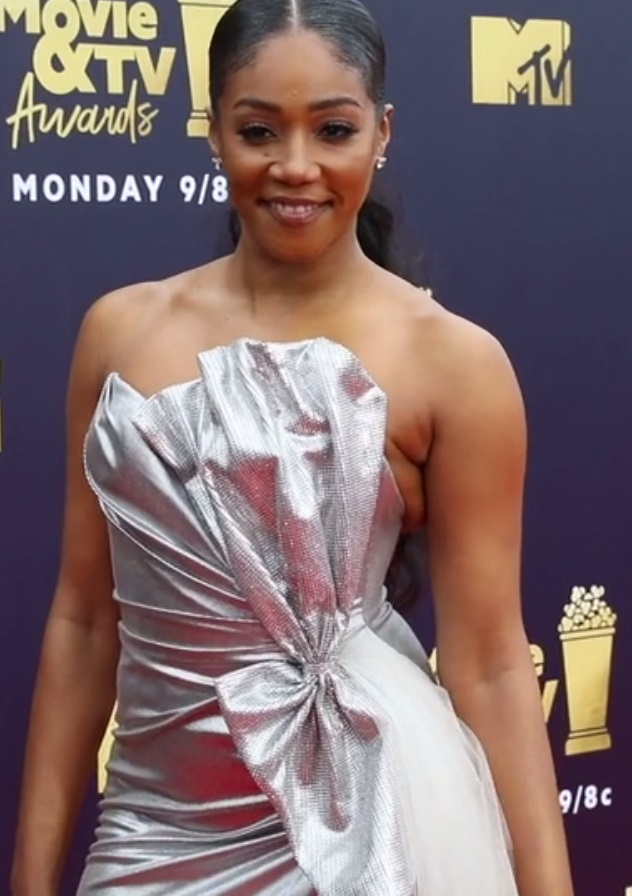
- Haddish at MTV Movie Awards in 2018
Award	Wins	Nominations
Primetime Emmy Awards	1	2
Grammy Awards	1	2

Tiffany Haddish is an American stand-up comedian and actress known for her appearances in film and television. She garnered critical acclaim for her performance in the comedy film Girls Trip (2017) and received various critics awards nominations. She also won a Primetime Emmy Award for Outstanding Guest Actress in a Comedy Series for her hosting gig on Saturday Night Live in 2018. She also received her first Grammy Award nomination in 2019 for Best Spoken Word Album for The Last Black Unicorn before winning Best Comedy Album for Black Mitzvah in 2021. She is the second African-American to win the category after Whoopi Goldberg in 1986.

== Major associations ==
=== Grammy Awards ===
A Grammy Award is an award presented by the Recording Academy to recognize achievements in the music industry.

Year	Nominated work	Category	Result	Ref.
2019	The Last Black Unicorn	Best Spoken Word Album	Nominated	
2021	Black Mitzvah	Best Comedy Album	Won	

=== Primetime Emmy Awards ===
A Primetime Emmy Award is an American award bestowed by the Academy of Television Arts & Sciences in recognition of excellence in American primetime television programming.

Year	Nominated work	Category	Result	Ref.
2018	Saturday Night Live	Outstanding Guest Actress in a Comedy Series	Won	
2020	Tiffany Haddish: Black Mitzvah	Outstanding Variety Special (Pre-Recorded)	Nominated	

== Critics Awards ==
=== African-American Film Critics Association ===
Year	Nominated work	Category	Result	Ref.
2018	Girls Trip	Best Supporting Actress	Won	

=== Alliance of Women Film Journalists ===
Year	Nominated work	Category	Result	Ref.
2018	Girls Trip	Best Breakthrough Performance	Nominated	
2020	Like a Boss	Like a Boss	Nominated	

=== American Black Film Festival ===
Year	Nominated work	Category	Result	Ref.
2017	Girls Trip	Rising Icon Award	Won	

=== Critics' Choice Movie Awards ===
Year	Nominated work	Category	Result	Ref.
2018	Girls Trip	Best Actress in a Comedy	Nominated	
2018	Girls Trip	Best Supporting Actress	Nominated	

=== Detroit Film Critics Society ===
Year	Nominated work	Category	Result	Ref.
2017	Girls Trip	Best Supporting Actress	Nominated	

=== Empire Awards ===
Year	Nominated work	Category	Result	Ref.
2018	Girls Trip	Best Actress	Nominated	

=== Essence Black Women in Hollywood Awards ===
Year	Nominated work	Category	Result	Ref.
2018	Herself	Honoree Award	Won	

=== New York Film Critics Circle ===
Year	Nominated work	Category	Result	Ref.
2018	Girls Trip	Best Supporting Actress	Won	

=== Online Film Critics Society ===
Year	Nominated work	Category	Result	Ref.
2017	Girls Trip	Best Supporting Actress	Nominated	

=== Washington D.C. Area Film Critics ===
Year	Nominated work	Category	Result	Ref.
2017	Girls Trip	Best Supporting Actress	Nominated	

== Miscellaneous Awards ==
=== BET Awards ===
The BET Awards were established in 2001 by the Black Entertainment Television network to celebrate African-Americans and other minorities in music, acting, sports, and other fields of entertainment over the past year.

Year	Nominated work	Category	Result	Ref.
2018	Girls Trip	Best Actress	Won	
2019	The Last O.G.	Best Actress	Nominated	

=== Black Reel Awards ===
The Black Reel Awards is an annual American awards ceremony hosted by the Foundation for the Augmentation of African-Americans in Film (FAAAF) to recognize excellence in African-American, as well as those of African diaspora's cinematic achievements in the around the world film industry as assessed by the Academy's voting membership.

Year	Nominated work	Category	Result	Ref.
2018	Girls Trip	Best Supporting Actress	Won	
2018	Girls Trip	Outstanding Breakthrough Performance, Female	Won	
2018	Saturday Night Live	Outstanding Guest Actress, Comedy Series	Won	
2018	The Last O.G.	Outstanding Actress, Comedy Series	Nominated	
2019	The Last O.G.	Outstanding Actress, Comedy Series	Nominated	

=== MTV Movie and TV Awards ===
Year	Nominated work	Category	Result	Ref.
2018	Girls Trip	Best Comedic Performance	Won	
2018	Girls Trip	Scene Stealer	Won	
2021	Kids Say the Darndest Things	Best Host	Nominated	

=== NAACP Image Awards ===
Year	Nominated work	Category	Result	Ref.
2018	Girls Trip	Outstanding Supporting Actress in a Motion Picture	Won	
2022	Herself	Entertainer of the Year	Nominated	

=== Nickelodeon Kids' Choice Awards ===
Year	Nominated work	Category	Result	Ref.
2020	The Secret Life of Pets 2 and The Lego Movie 2: The Second Part	Favorite Female Voice from an Animated Movie	Nominated	
