= List of roles and awards of Sara Ramirez =

Sara Ramirez is a Mexican-American actor. They are known for acting in films, television shows, stage productions as well as voicing roles in video games.

== Filmography ==
=== Film, video games, and television ===
| Year | Title | Role | Notes |
|---|---|---|---|
| 1998 | You've Got Mail | Rose | |
| 1999 | Um Jammer Lammy | Lammy (voice) | Video game |
| 2000 | Star Patrol | Lieutenant Vena | TV movie |
| 2000 | Spin City | Carol Quinn | Episode: "About Last Night" |
| 2000 | Third Watch | Gwen Girard | Episode: "The Tys That Bind" |
| 2000 | Welcome to New York | Linda | Episode: "The Crier" |
| 2000, 2002 | Law & Order: Special Victims Unit | Mrs. Barrera | Episode: "Baby Killer" |
| 2000, 2002 | Law & Order: Special Victims Unit | Lisa Perez | Episode: "Chameleon" |
| 2001 | PaRappa the Rapper 2 | Lammy (voice) | Video game |
| 2002 | Spider-Man | Police officer at carjacking | |
| 2002 | Washington Heights | Belkis | |
| 2002 | Baseball Wives | Gabriella Martinez | TV movie |
| 2002 | Chicago | Female ensemble (Vocals) | |
| 2003 | Naked Hotel | Unknown | TV movie |
| 2003 | As the World Turns | Hannah Bulut | 4 episodes |
| 2003 | When Ocean Meets Sky | Peggy Fears (voice) | |
| 2004 | NYPD Blue | Irma Pacheco | Episode: "Who's Your Daddy?" |
| 2006–2016 | Grey's Anatomy | Calliope Torres | 241 episodes; recurring (Season 2); main cast (Seasons 3–12) |
| 2012–2018 | Sofia the First | Queen Miranda (voice) | 54 episodes; main cast (Seasons 1–4) |
| 2014 | Dora the Explorer | Queen of Hearts (voice) | Episode: "Dora in Wonderland" |
| 2016 | Elena and the Secret of Avalor | Queen Miranda (voice) | TV movie |
| 2017–2019 | Madam Secretary | Kat Sandoval | 36 episodes; main cast (Seasons 4–5) |
| 2019 | Vampirina | Mama Calaca (voice) | Episode: "Dia de los Muertos/As You Wish" |
| 2021–2023 | And Just Like That... | Che Diaz | 21 episodes; main cast Season 1–2 |
| 2024 | Velma | Amber (voice) | Season 2 |
| 2026 | Sofia the First: Royal Magic | Queen Miranda (voice) | Recurring role |
| 2026 | The Legend of Vox Machina | Yudala fon (voice) | Episode: "De Rolo's Eleven" |

=== Stage productions ===
| Year | Title | Role | Theatre |
|---|---|---|---|
| 1998 | The Capeman | Wahzinak | Marquis Theatre; January 29 – March 28, 1998 |
| 1999 | The Gershwins' Fascinating Rhythm | Performer | Longacre Theatre; April 25 – May 9, 1999 |
| 2001 | A Class Act | Felicia | Ambassador Theatre; March 11 – June 10, 2001 |
| 2001 | Dreamgirls | Ensemble | Ford Center for the Performing Arts; September 24, 2001 |
| 2002 | A Little Night Music | Petra | Ravinia Festival; August 22 – 24, 2002 |
| 2002 | The Vagina Monologues | Performer | Westside Theatre; November 12 – December 1, 2002 |
| 2003 | The Game | Marquise de Merteuil | Barrington Stage; August 7 - 23, 2003 |
| 2004 | Spamalot | The Lady of the Lake | Shubert Theatre, Chicago; December 21, 2004 – January 23, 2005 |
| 2005 | Spamalot | The Lady of the Lake | Shubert Theatre, Broadway; February 14 – December 18, 2005 |

== Awards and nominations ==
| Year | Award | Category | Nominated work | Result | Ref. |
|---|---|---|---|---|---|
| 1999 | Outer Critics Circle Award | Outstanding Leading Actress in a Musical | The Gershwins' Fascinating Rhythm | Nominated | |
| 2005 | Tony Award | Best Performance by a Featured Actress in a Musical | Monty Python's Spamalot | Won | |
| 2005 | Outer Critics Circle Award | Outstanding Featured Actress in a Musical | Monty Python's Spamalot | Won | |
| 2005 | Drama League Award | Distinguished Performance | Monty Python's Spamalot | Nominated | |
| 2006 | Grammy Award | Best Musical Show Album | Monty Python's Spamalot | Won | |
| 2006 | Satellite Awards | Best Cast – Television Series | Grey's Anatomy | Won | |
| 2007 | Screen Actors Guild Award | Outstanding Performance by an Ensemble in a Drama Series | Grey's Anatomy | Won | |
| 2007 | Imagen Awards | Best Supporting Actress - Television | Grey's Anatomy | Nominated | |
| 2007 | ALMA Award | Outstanding Actress - Television Series, Mini-Series, or TV Movie | Grey's Anatomy | Nominated | |
| 2008 | Screen Actors Guild Award | Outstanding Performance by an Ensemble in a Drama Series | Grey's Anatomy | Nominated | |
| 2008 | ALMA Award | Outstanding Actress in a Drama Television Series | Grey's Anatomy | Nominated | |
| 2009 | ALMA Award | Outstanding Actress in a Drama Series | Grey's Anatomy | Nominated | |
| 2011 | NAACP Image Award | Outstanding Supporting Actress in a Drama Series | Grey's Anatomy | Nominated | |
| 2011 | ALMA Award | Outstanding Actress in a Drama Television Series | Grey's Anatomy | Nominated | |
| 2012 | ALMA Award | Favorite TV Actress - Supporting Role | Grey's Anatomy | Nominated | |
| 2016 | People's Choice Awards | Favorite Dramatic TV Actress | Grey's Anatomy | Nominated | |
