= List of awards and honors received by Gregory Peck =

List of Gregory Peck's awards
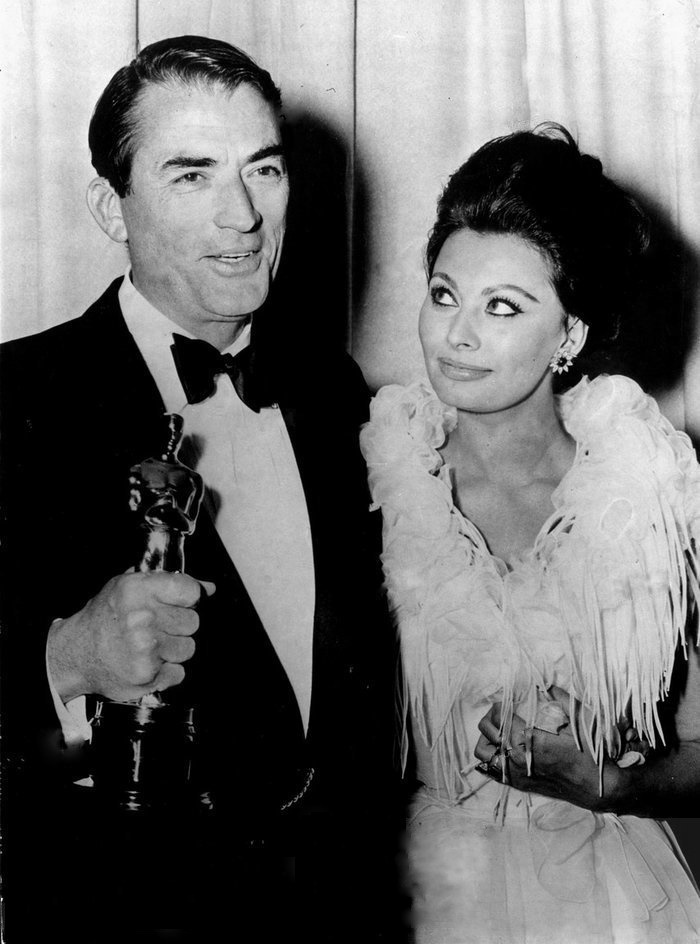
- Peck with Sophia Loren at the 35th Academy Awards where he won Best Actor
Award	Wins	Nominations
Academy Awards	2	6
BAFTA Awards	0	2
Primetime Emmy Awards	0	1
Golden Globe Awards	6	9
Grammy Awards	0	2
Screen Actors Guild Awards	1	1

Gregory Peck was the recipient of many awards and accolades throughout his lifetime for his work in film productions, television programmes, and humanitarian endeavors. He received five Academy Award nominations for Best Actor, winning once for his performance in To Kill a Mockingbird (1963), and was honored with their Jean Hersholt Humanitarian Award in 1967 for his political and charitable contributions. Peck also won five of his eight competitive Golden Globe Awards nominations, receiving the Golden Globe Award for Best Actor – Motion Picture Drama twice and the Golden Globe Award for Best Supporting Actor – Motion Picture once, and was given their honorary Cecil B. DeMille Award in 1969. Peck received his only Emmy Award nomination for Outstanding Supporting Actor in a Miniseries or a Movie as a result of his performance in the miniseries Moby Dick (1998).

Peck was also honored with multiple lifetime achievement awards, among them the Screen Actors Guild Life Achievement Award and the Donostia Lifetime Achievement Award. He has previously been recognized by the American Film Institute, having been honored with the AFI Life Achievement Award and being listed as the twelfth-greatest screen legend in classic Hollywood cinema. Peck also received a star on the Hollywood Walk of Fame for his contributions to the film industry. Peck was the recipient of two civil awards from the United States government: the Presidential Medal of Freedom for his humanitarian and political work, and the National Medal of Arts for his accomplishments in entertainment.

== List ==
=== Academy Awards ===
The Academy Awards, popularly known as the Oscars, are an annual presentation of awards organized by the Academy of Motion Picture Arts and Sciences for excellence in filmmaking. Peck received five total nominations, winning once for his portrayal as Atticus Finch in To Kill a Mockingbird (1963). He was honored with the Jean Hersholt Humanitarian Award in 1967 for his humanitarian and charitable achievements.

Year	Nominated work	Category	Result	Ref.
1945	The Keys of the Kingdom	Best Actor	Nominated	
1946	The Yearling	Best Actor	Nominated	
1947	Gentleman's Agreement	Best Actor	Nominated	
1949	Twelve O'Clock High	Best Actor	Nominated	
1963	To Kill a Mockingbird	Best Actor	Won	
1967	—N/a	Jean Hersholt Humanitarian Award	Honoured	

=== British Academy Film Awards ===
The British Academy Film Awards, or the BAFTAS, are an annual awards show presented by the British Academy of Film and Television Arts, honoring professionals in film, television, video games, and animation. Peck garnered two competitive nominations for Best Foreign Actor.

Year	Category	Nominated work	Result	Ref.
1954	Roman Holiday	Best Foreign Actor	Nominated	
1964	To Kill a Mockingbird	Best Foreign Actor	Nominated	

=== Golden Globe Awards ===
The Golden Globe Awards are presented each year by the 93 members of the Hollywood Foreign Press Association recognizing achievements in the film and television industry, both domestic and foreign. Peck received eight total competitive nominations, winning five times, and also received an honorary award for which he was nominated; in all he garnered awards for Best Actor twice and World Film Favorite twice, and won the award for Best Supporting Actor in a Series, Miniseries or TV Film once. Peck was honored with the Cecil B. DeMille Award for "outstanding contributions to the world of entertainment".

Year	Nominated work	Category	Result	Ref.
1946	The Yearling	Best Actor – Motion Picture Drama	Won	
1951	—N/a	World Film Favorite - Male	Won	
1955	—N/a	World Film Favorite - Male	Won	
1962	To Kill a Mockingbird	Best Actor – Motion Picture Drama	Won	
1963	Captain Newman, M.D.	Best Actor – Motion Picture Drama	Nominated	
1969	—N/a	Cecil B. DeMille Award	Honoured	
1977	MacArthur	Best Actor – Motion Picture Drama	Nominated	
1978	The Boys from Brazil	Best Actor – Motion Picture Drama	Nominated	
1998	Moby Dick	Best Supporting Actor – Series, Miniseries or Television Film	Won	

=== Emmy Awards ===
The Primetime Emmy Awards are an annual awards ceremony organized by the Academy of Television Arts & Sciences, honoring outstanding achievements in primetime television programming. Peck received one nomination for his performance in the 1998 mini-series Moby Dick.

Year	Nominated work	Category	Result	Ref.
1998	Moby Dick	Outstanding Supporting Actor in a Miniseries or a Movie	Nominated	

=== Grammy Awards ===
The Grammy Awards are a presentation of awards bestowed annually by the Academy of Recording Arts and Sciences for excellence in the music industry. Peck received two total competitive nominations.

Year	Nominated work	Category	Result	Ref.
1995	The Bible (The New Testament)	Best Spoken Word Album	Nominated	
1997	Harry S Truman: A Journey to Independence	Best Spoken Word Album	Nominated	

=== Screen Actors Guild Awards ===
The Screen Actors Guild Awards is an annual ceremony recognizing excellence in the fields of film and primetime television by its members, the Screen Actors Guild. Peck was honored with the Life Achievement Award for "outstanding achievement in fostering the finest ideals of the acting profession."

Year	Nominated work	Category	Result	Ref.
1970	—N/a	Life Achievement Award	Honoured	

=== Civil awards ===
The United States government bestows civil awards and decorations bestowed onto citizens for acts of accomplishment benefiting the nation as a whole. In his lifetime, Peck was a recipient of the Presidential Medal of Freedom by President Lyndon B. Johnson for his humanitarian efforts and the National Medal of Arts by President Bill Clinton for his contributions to acting.

Year	Nominated work	Category	Result	Ref.
1969	—N/a	Presidential Medal of Freedom	Honoured	
1998	—N/a	National Medal of Arts	Honoured	

=== Further honours ===
Peck's acting and humanitarianism have been recognized by numerous institutional honors, including the AFI Life Achievement Award, the Donostia Lifetime Achievement Award, and the Honorary Golden Bear. Peck was also given the George Eastman Award by the George Eastman House in 1987, the Career Achievement Award by the National Board of Review in 1989, and the Marian Anderson Award by Marian Anderson's estate in 1999. Peck was a recipient at the Kennedy Center Honors in 1991.

For his contribution to the motion picture industry, Gregory Peck has a star on the Hollywood Walk of Fame at 6100 Hollywood Boulevard. In November 2005, the star was stolen, and has since been replaced. On April 28, 2011, a ceremony was held in Beverly Hills, California, celebrating the first day of issue of a U.S. postage stamp commemorating Peck. The stamp is the 17th commemorative stamp in the "Legends of Hollywood" series.

The Gregory Peck Award was inaugurated at the Dingle International Film Festival, the ancestral home of the Peck family, in 2008. Since 2014, the award has been presented for lifetime cinematic achievement and excellence at the San Diego International Film Festival. Past honorees include Gabriel Byrne, Laura Dern, Patrick Stewart and Laurence Fishburne.
