= List of awards and nominations received by Rod Steiger =

Rod Steiger awards and nominations
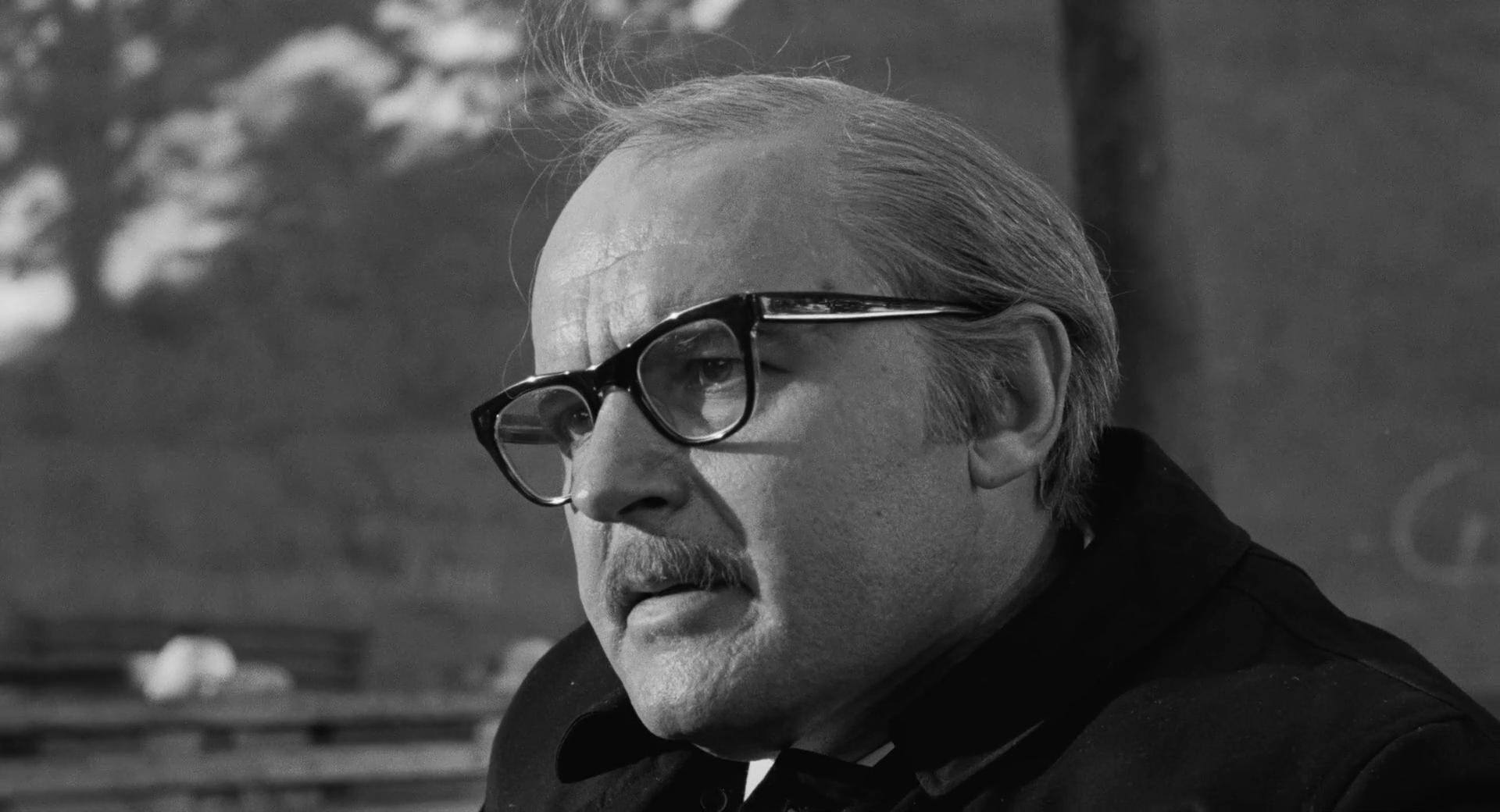
Awards and nominations
Award	Wins	Nominations
Golden Globe	1	2
Academy Awards	1	3
BAFTA Awards	2	2
Emmy Awards	1	3

Totals (Note: Certain award groups do not simply award one winner. They acknowledge several different recipients, have runners-up, and have third place. Since this is a specific recognition and is different from losing an award, runner-up mentions are considered wins in this award tally. For simplification and to avoid errors, each award in this list has been presumed to have had a prior nomination.)
- Wins: 23
- Nominations: 41

Rod Steiger (April 14, 1925 – July 9, 2002) was an American actor, noted for his portrayal of offbeat, often volatile, and crazed characters. Over his distinguished career he received three Academy Award nominations for his performances as Marlon Brando's mobster brother Charley in On the Waterfront (1954), the title character Sol Nazerman in The Pawnbroker (1964), and as police chief Bill Gillespie opposite Sidney Poitier in the film In the Heat of the Night (1967), which won him the Academy Award for Best Actor. He received two Primetime Emmy Awards nominations for Playhouse 90 and Bob Hope Presents The Chrysler Theatre. He also received two British Academy Film Awards nominations, and two Golden Globe Awards nominations with one win for In the Heat of the Night.

== Major awards ==
=== Academy Awards ===
Year	Category	Nominated work	Result	Ref.
Academy Awards
1954	Best Supporting Actor	On the Waterfront	Nominated	
1965	Best Actor	The Pawnbroker	Nominated	
1967	Best Actor	In the Heat of the Night	Won	

=== Golden Globe Awards ===
Year	Category	Nominated work	Result	Ref.
Golden Globe Awards
1965	Best Actor — Motion Picture Drama	The Pawnbroker	Nominated	
1967	Best Actor — Motion Picture Drama	In the Heat of the Night	Won	

=== Emmy Awards ===
Year	Category	Nominated work	Result	Ref.
Primetime Emmy Awards
1959	Best Single Performance by an Actor	Playhouse 90	Nominated	
1964	Best Single Performance by an Actor	Bob Hope Presents The Chrysler Theatre	Nominated	
New York Emmy Awards
1967	Individuals	Sunday Showcase	Won	

=== BAFTA Awards ===
Year	Category	Nominated work	Result	Ref.
British Academy Film Awards
1967	Best Foreign Actor	The Pawnbroker	Won	
1968	Best Foreign Actor	In the Heat of the Night	Won	

== Other Awards ==
=== Berlin International Film Festival ===
Year	Category	Nominated work	Result	Ref.
1964	Silver Bear	The Pawnbroker	Won	

=== New York Film Critics Circle ===
Year	Category	Nominated work	Result	Ref.
1967	Best Actor	In the Heat of the Night	Nominated	
1965	Best Actor	The Pawnbroker	Won	

=== National Board of Review ===
Year	Category	Nominated work	Result	Ref.
1968	Best Actor	In the Heat of the Night	Won	

=== Hollywood Walk of Fame ===
Year	Category	Result	Ref.
1997	Star on the Hollywood Walk of Fame	Received	
