= List of awards and nominations received by Elaine Stritch =

List of Elaine Stritch awards
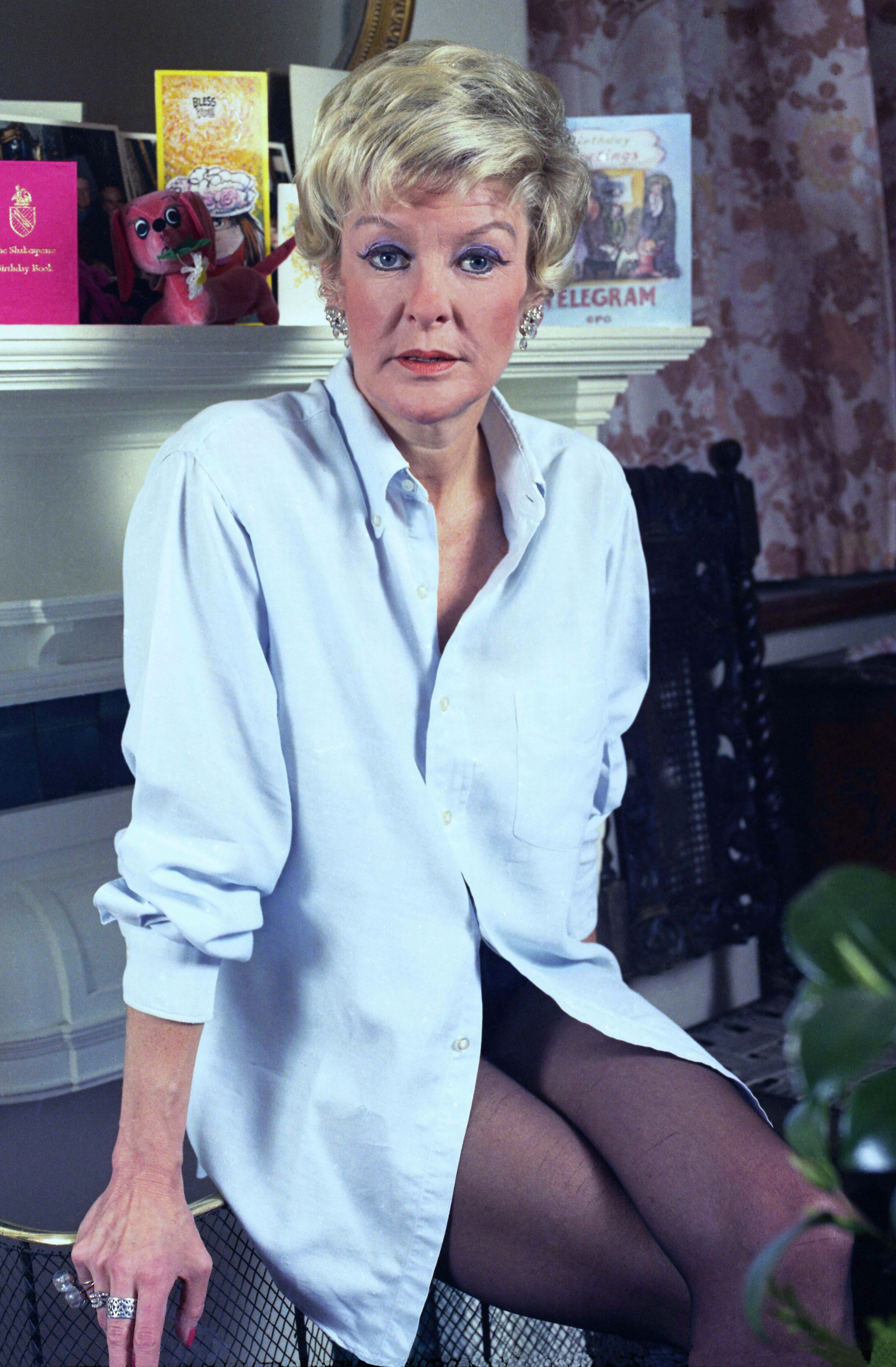
Award	Wins	Nominations
Tony Awards	1	5
Emmy Awards	4	9
Grammy Awards	0	1

Elaine Stritch was an American actress of the stage and screen.

Over her 70-year career on stage and screen she received various awards and nominations for her performances including a Tony Award, four Primetime Emmy Awards, three Drama Desk Awards, and two Obie Awards. In 1995 she was inducted into the American Theatre Hall of Fame. She also received a Grammy Award, BAFTA Award, and two Laurence Olivier Award nominations.

She received five Tony Award nominations for her performances in the William Inge play Bus Stop (1956), the Noël Coward musical Sail Away (1962), the Stephen Sondheim musical Company (1971), and for the revival of the Edward Albee play A Delicate Balance (1996). Her one-woman show Elaine Stritch at Liberty won the 2002 Tony Award for Best Special Theatrical Event. The show was filmed for HBO and received two Primetime Emmy Awards for Outstanding Variety Special and Outstanding Individual Performance in a Variety or Music Program.

On television, she played Colleen Donaghy, the cold and overbearing mother of Jack Donaghy (Alec Baldwin) in the NBC comedy series 30 Rock from 2007 to 2012. The role earned her the Primetime Emmy Award for Outstanding Guest Actress in a Comedy Series.

== Major associations ==
=== Tony Awards ===
Year	Category	Nominated work	Result	Ref.
1956	Best Supporting or Featured Actress in a Play	Bus Stop	Nominated	
1962	Best Leading Actress in a Musical	Sail Away	Nominated	
1971	Best Leading Actress in a Musical	Company	Nominated	
1996	Best Leading Actress in a Play	A Delicate Balance	Nominated	
2002	Special Theatrical Event	Elaine Stritch at Liberty	Won	

=== Emmy Awards ===
Year	Category	Nominated work	Result	Ref.
1991	Outstanding Supporting Actress in a Miniseries or Special	An Inconvenient Woman	Nominated	
1993	Outstanding Guest Actress in a Drama Series	Law & Order (episode: "Point of View")	Won	
2004	Outstanding Variety, Music, or Comedy Special	Elaine Stritch at Liberty	Won	
2004	Individual Performance in a Variety or Music Program	Elaine Stritch at Liberty	Won	
2007	Outstanding Guest Actress in a Comedy Series	30 Rock (episode: "Hiatus")	Won	
2008	Outstanding Guest Actress in a Comedy Series	30 Rock (episode: "Ludachristmas")	Nominated	
2009	Outstanding Guest Actress in a Comedy Series	30 Rock (episode: "Christmas Special")	Nominated	
2010	Outstanding Guest Actress in a Comedy Series	30 Rock (episode: "The Moms")	Nominated	
2013	Outstanding Guest Actress in a Comedy Series	30 Rock (episode: "My Whole Life Is Thunder")	Nominated	

=== Grammy Awards ===
Year	Category	Nominated work	Result	Ref.
2005	Best Spoken Word Album for Children	The Best Halloween Ever	Nominated	

== Industry awards ==
=== British Academy Television Award ===
Year	Category	Nominated work	Result	Ref.
1979	Light Entertainment Performance	Two's Company	Nominated	

=== Drama Desk Award ===
Year	Category	Nominated work	Result	Ref.
1995	Outstanding Actress in a Musical	Show Boat	Nominated	
1996	Outstanding Featured Actress in a Play	A Delicate Balance	Won	
2002	Outstanding Solo Performance	Elaine Stritch at Liberty	Won	
2002	Outstanding Book of a Musical	Elaine Stritch at Liberty	Won	

=== Drama League Award ===
Year	Category	Nominated work	Result	Ref.
2002	Distinguished Achievement in Musical Theatre	Elaine Stritch at Liberty	Won	

=== Lucille Lortel Award ===
Year	Category	Nominated work	Result	Ref.
2002	Outstanding Lead Actress	Elaine Stritch at Liberty	Nominated	

=== New York Drama Critics' Circle Award ===
Year	Category	Nominated work	Result	Ref.
2002	Special Citation	Elaine Stritch at Liberty	Honoree	

=== Obie Award ===
Year	Category	Nominated work	Result	Ref.
2002	Performance	Elaine Stritch at Liberty	Won	
2002	Special Citation	Elaine Stritch at Liberty	Honoree	

=== Outer Critics Circle Award ===
Year	Category	Nominated work	Result	Ref.
2002	Outstanding Solo Performance	Elaine Stritch at Liberty	Won	

=== Laurence Olivier Award ===
Year	Category	Nominated work	Result	Ref.
2003	Best Entertainment	Elaine Stritch at Liberty	Nominated	
2003	Best Actress in a Musical or Entertainment	Elaine Stritch at Liberty	Nominated	
