= List of awards and nominations received by Fred Armisen =

Fred Armisen awards and nominations
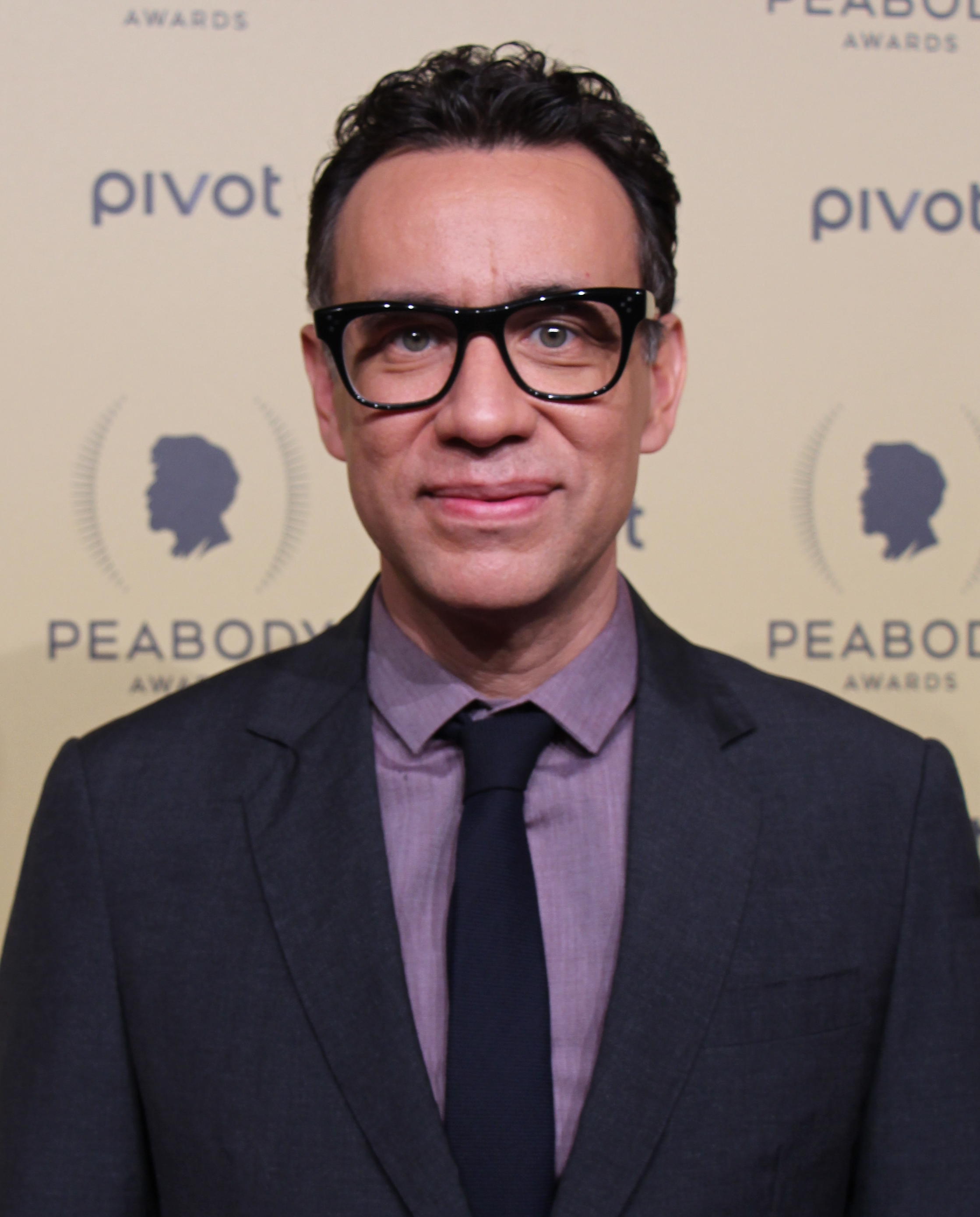
- Armisen in 2015
Award	Wins	Nominations
Primetime Emmy Awards	0	15
Grammy Award	0	1
Writers Guild of America Awards	2	7
Peabody Award	2	3

Fred Armisen is a comedian, actor, writer, producer, and musician.

He is the recipient of numerous awards and nominations, including multiple Primetime Emmy Awards and a Grammy Award. He is known for his appearances in film, and television. Armisen has been nominated for fourteen Primetime Emmy Awards for his work in television for writing for Saturday Night Live, Portlandia, and Documentary Now!. He was also nominated for the Grammy Award for Best Comedy Album for Standup for Drummers (2015). In 2012, he won the Peabody Award for Portlandia. He has received seven Writers Guild of America Award nominations winning twice for Portlandia (2013), and Saturday Night Live (2017).

== Major associations ==
=== Primetime Emmy Awards ===
Year	Category	Nominated work	Result	Ref.
2012	Outstanding Writing for a Variety Series	Portlandia	Nominated	
2013	Outstanding Writing for a Variety Series	Portlandia	Nominated	
2014	Outstanding Writing for a Variety Series	Portlandia	Nominated	
2014	Outstanding Supporting Actor in a Comedy Series	Portlandia	Nominated	
2015	Outstanding Variety Sketch Series	Portlandia	Nominated	
2015	Outstanding Writing for a Variety Special	Saturday Night Live 40th Anniversary Special	Nominated	
2016	Outstanding Variety Sketch Series	Documentary Now!	Nominated	
2016	Outstanding Variety Sketch Series	Portlandia	Nominated	
2016	Outstanding Writing for a Variety Series	Portlandia	Nominated	
2016	Outstanding Writing for a Variety Series	Saturday Night Live	Nominated	
2017	Outstanding Variety Sketch Series	Documentary Now!	Nominated	
2017	Outstanding Variety Sketch Series	Portlandia	Nominated	
2018	Outstanding Variety Sketch Series	Portlandia	Nominated	
2019	Outstanding Variety Sketch Series	Documentary Now!	Nominated	
2024	Outstanding Music Direction	Late Night with Seth Meyers	Nominated	

=== Grammy Awards ===
Year	Category	Nominated work	Result	Ref.
2019	Best Comedy Album	Standup for Drummers	Nominated	

== Industry awards ==
=== Peabody Awards ===
Year	Category	Nominated work	Result	Ref.
2012	Peabody Award	Portlandia	Won	
2022	Entertainment	Los Espookys	Won	
2022	Entertainment	Documentary Now!	Nominated	

=== Writers Guild Award ===
Year	Category	Nominated work	Result	Ref.
2013	Comedy-Variety Talk Series	Portlandia	Won	
2014	Comedy-Variety Talk Series	Portlandia	Nominated	
2016	Comedy/Variety (Music, Awards, Tributes) – Specials	Portlandia	Nominated	
2017	Comedy-Variety Talk Series	Documentary Now!	Nominated	
2017	Comedy-Variety Talk Series	Saturday Night Live	Won	
2018	Comedy-Variety Talk Series	Portlandia	Nominated	
2019	Comedy-Variety Talk Series	Portlandia	Nominated	
