= List of awards and nominations received by Sela Ward =

Sela Ward awards and nominations
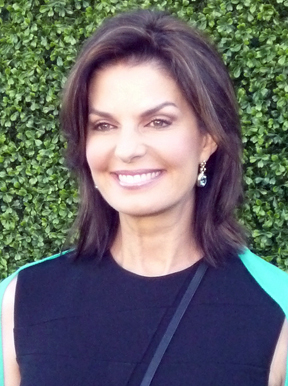
- Ward in 2010
Awards and nominations
Award	Wins	Nominations

Totals (Note: Certain award groups do not simply award one winner. They acknowledge several different recipients, have runners-up, and have third place. Since this is a specific recognition and is different from losing an award, runner-up mentions are considered wins in this award tally. For simplification and to avoid errors, each award in this list has been presumed to have had a prior nomination.)
- Wins: 8
- Nominations: 26

This is a list of awards and nominations received by American actress, author, and producer Sela Ward.

== Major associations ==
=== Golden Globe Awards ===
Year	Nominated work	Category	Result	Ref.
1994	Sisters	Best Performance by an Actress in a Television Series – Drama	Nominated	
2000	Once and Again	Best Performance by an Actress in a Television Series – Drama	Nominated	
2001	Once and Again	Best Performance by an Actress in a Television Series – Drama	Won	
2002	Once and Again	Best Performance by an Actress in a Television Series – Drama	Nominated	

=== Primetime Emmy Awards ===
Year	Nominated work	Category	Result	Ref.
1994	Sisters	Outstanding Lead Actress in a Drama Series	Won	
1996	Almost Golden: The Jessica Savitch Story	Outstanding Lead Actress in a Miniseries or Movie	Nominated	
2000	Once and Again	Outstanding Lead Actress in a Drama Series	Won	
2001	Once and Again	Outstanding Lead Actress in a Drama Series	Nominated	

=== Screen Actors Guild Awards ===
Year	Nominated work	Category	Result	Ref.
1996	Sisters	Outstanding Performance by a Female Actor in a Drama Series	Nominated	
1996	Almost Golden: The Jessica Savitch Story	Outstanding Performance by a Female Actor in a TV Movie or Miniseries	Nominated	
2001	Once and Again	Outstanding Performance by a Female Actor in a Drama Series	Nominated	

== Other awards and nominations ==
=== CableACE Awards ===
Year	Nominated work	Category	Result	Ref.
1996	Almost Golden: The Jessica Savitch Story	Actress in a Movie or Miniseries	Won	

=== CinemaCon Awards ===
Year	Nominated work	Category	Result	Ref.
2016	Independence Day: Resurgence	Ensemble of the Universe	Won	

=== Gold Derby Awards ===
Year	Nominated work	Category	Result	Ref.
2005	House	Drama Guest Actress	Nominated	
2015	Gone Girl	Ensemble Cast	Nominated	

=== Golden Raspberry Awards ===
Year	Nominated work	Category	Result	Ref.
2017	Independence Day: Resurgence	Worst Supporting Actress	Nominated	

=== Online Film & Television Association Awards ===
Year	Nominated work	Category	Result	Ref.
2000	Once and Again	Best Actress in a New Drama Series	Won	
2000	Once and Again	Best Actress in a Drama Series	Nominated	
2001	Once and Again	Best Actress in a Drama Series	Won	
2002	Once and Again	Best Actress in a Drama Series	Nominated	

=== Satellite Awards ===
Year	Nominated work	Category	Result	Ref.
2001	Once and Again	Best Performance by an Actress in a Series – Drama	Nominated	
2002	Once and Again	Best Performance by an Actress in a Series – Drama	Nominated	

=== TCA Awards ===
Year	Nominated work	Category	Result	Ref.
2000	Once and Again	Individual Achievement in Drama	Nominated	

=== TV Guide Awards ===
Year	Nominated work	Category	Result	Ref.
2000	Once and Again	Favorite Actress in a New Series	Nominated	
2001	Once and Again	Actress of the Year in a Drama Series	Nominated	

=== Viewers for Quality Television Awards ===
Year	Nominated work	Category	Result	Ref.
2000	Once and Again	Best Actress in a Quality Drama Series	Won	
