= List of awards and nominations received by Stanley Donen =

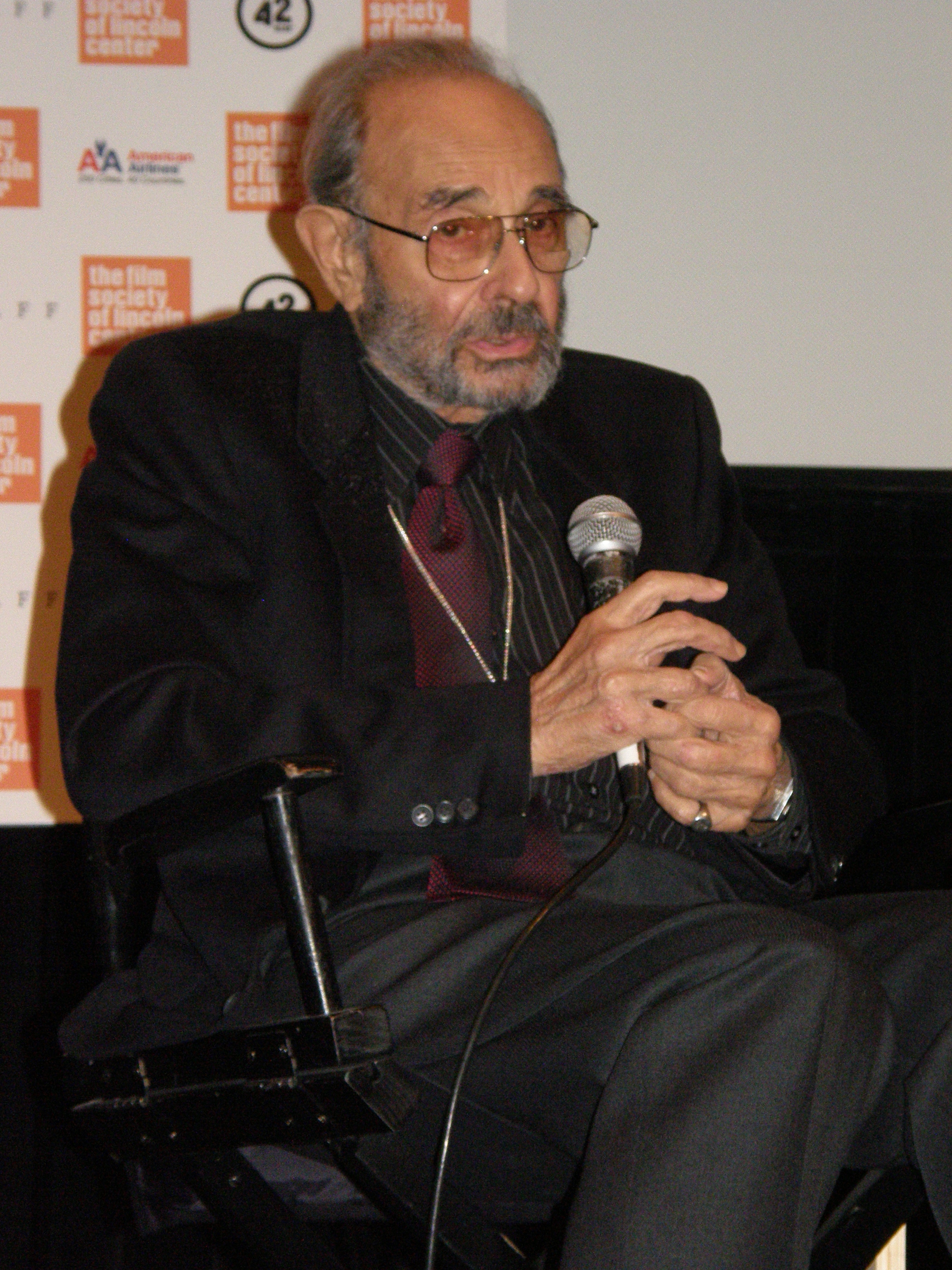
Donen at the Film Society of Lincoln Center in 2010

Stanley Donen was an American film director and choreographer. He is known for his innovative musicals of the golden age of Hollywood which include Singin' in the Rain (1952), On the Town (1949), Funny Face (1957), It's Always Fair Weather (1955), as well as the romance films Charade (1963), Indiscreet (1958), and Two for the Road (1967).

== Major associations ==
=== Academy Awards ===
Year	Category	Nominated work	Result	Ref.
1998	Honorary Academy Award	—N/a	Won	

=== Drama Desk Awards ===
Year	Category	Nominated work	Result	Ref.
1986	Best Choreography	Singin' in the Rain	Nominated	

=== Directors Guild Award ===
Year	Category	Nominated work	Result	Ref.
1952	Best Director - Feature Film	Singin' in the Rain (with Gene Kelly)	Nominated	
1954	Best Director - Feature Film	Seven Brides for Seven Brothers	Nominated	
1957	Best Director - Feature Film	Funny Face	Nominated	
1958	Best Director - Feature Film	Damn Yankees! (with George Abbott)	Nominated	
1967	Best Director - Feature Film	Two for the Road	Nominated	

== Film festivals ==
=== Cannes Film Festival ===
Year	Category	Nominated work	Result	Ref.
1957	Palme d'Or	Funny Face	Nominated	

=== Berlin International Film Festival ===
Year	Category	Nominated work	Result	Ref.
1979	Silver Bear	Movie Movie	Nominated	

=== Edinburgh International Festival ===
Year	Category	Nominated work	Result	Ref.
1995		Retrospective	Event	

=== Palm Springs Film Festival ===
Year	Category	Nominated work	Result	Ref.
1996	Director's Achievement Award		Won	
1999	Lifetime Achievement Award		Won	

=== San Francisco Film Festival ===
Year	Category	Nominated work	Result	Ref.
1995	Akira Kurosawa Award		Won	

=== San Sebastián Film Festival ===
Year	Category	Nominated work	Result	Ref.
1967	Golden Seashell Award	Two for the Road	Won	

=== Venice Film Festival ===
Year	Category	Nominated work	Result	Ref.
2004	Golden Lion	—N/a	Won	

== Critics awards ==
=== Los Angeles Film Critics Association ===
Year	Category	Nominated work	Result	Ref.
1989	Career Achievement Award	—N/a	Won	

=== National Board of Review ===
Year	Category	Nominated work	Result	Ref.
1995	Billy Wilder Award	—N/a	Won	

== Miscellaneous awards ==
Awards
Year	Organization	Award	Result	Ref.
1989	University of South Carolina	Honorary Doctorate in Fine Arts	Won	
1999	Joseph Plateau Awards	Life Achievement Award	Won	
1999	American Cinema Editors Awards	Golden Eddie Filmmaker of the Year Award	Won	
2000	ASCAP Film and Television Music Awards	Opus Award	Won	
2001	Savannah Film Festival	Johnny Mercer Award	Won	
2001	American Society of Cinematographers Awards	Board of the Governors Award	Won	
2009	Boston Pops Orchestra	Tribute Performance	Event	
2009	The Astaire Awards	Douglas Watt 2009 Lifetime Achievement Award	Won	
2010	Film Society of Lincoln Center	Week-long tribute and retrospective	Event	
2011	Israel Film Festival	Lifetime Achievement Award	Won	
2014	Nickelodeon Theatre	Month-long tribute and retrospective	Event	
2015	Marbella International Film Festival	Tribute at la Semana Internacional de Cine	Event	
2017	South Carolina Hall of Fame	Inductee	Won	
