= List of awards and nominations received by Michael K. Williams =

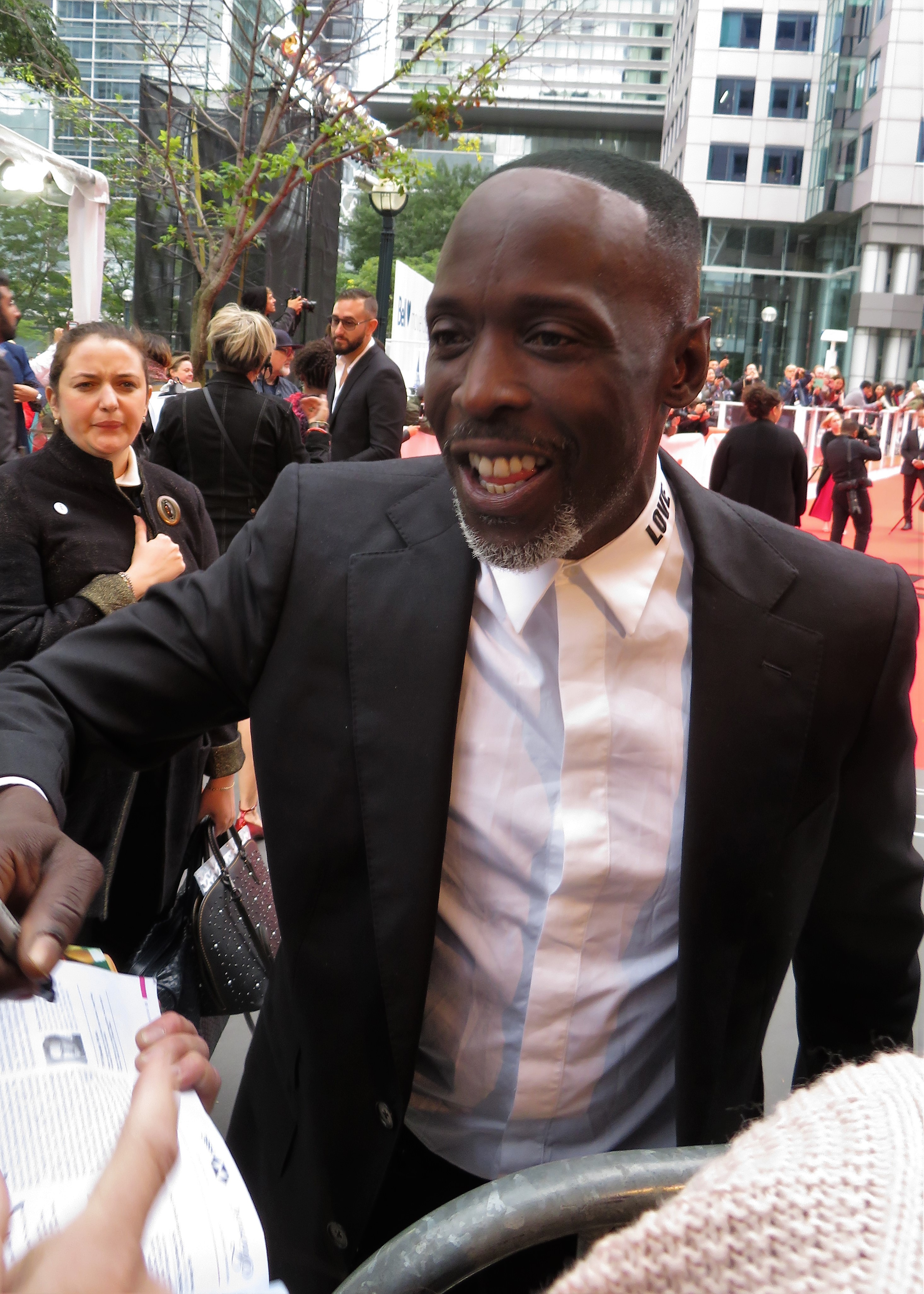
- Williams at the Toronto Film Festival in 2018
Award	Wins	Nominations
Emmy Awards	0	5
Screen Actors Guild Awards	1	4
Critics Choice Awards	1	1
Independent Spirit Awards	1	1

Michael Kenneth Williams was an American actor known for his roles in film and television and theatre.

He is most known for his performances as Omar Little on the HBO drama series The Wire from 2002 to 2008 and Albert "Chalky" White on the HBO series Boardwalk Empire from 2010 to 2014. He earned Primetime Emmy Award nominations for his performances in the HBO television biopic Bessie (2015), the Netflix drama series When They See Us (2019), and the HBO projects The Night Of (2016) and Lovecraft Country (2020). He has a recurring role in the sitcom Community from 2011 to 2012. He is also known for his supporting roles in a number of films including Ben Affleck's Gone Baby Gone (2006), John Hillcoat's The Road (2009), Steve McQueen's period drama 12 Years a Slave (2013), Paul Thomas Anderson's drama Inherent Vice (2014), and Edward Norton's Motherless Brooklyn (2019).

Williams received four Screen Actors Guild Award nominations for 12 Years a Slave (2013), Boardwalk Empire (2014, 2015), and Lovecraft Country (2021). He also received a Critics' Choice Television Award for Best Supporting Actor in a Drama Series for his performance Lovecraft Country. He also received the Independent Spirit Robert Altman Award along with the ensemble cast of Inherent Vice (2014).

== Major associations ==
=== Emmy Awards ===
Year	Category	Nominated work	Result	Ref.
Primetime Emmy Awards
2015	Outstanding Supporting Actor in a Limited Series or Movie	Bessie	Nominated	
2017	Outstanding Supporting Actor in a Limited Series or Movie	The Night Of	Nominated	
2018	Outstanding Informational Series or Special	Vice	Nominated	
2019	Outstanding Supporting Actor in a Limited Series or Movie	When They See Us	Nominated	
2021	Outstanding Supporting Actor in a Drama Series	Lovecraft Country	Nominated	

=== Screen Actors Guild Awards ===
Year	Category	Nominated work	Result	Ref.
2011	Outstanding Ensemble in a Drama Series	Boardwalk Empire	Won	
2013	Outstanding Ensemble in a Drama Series	Boardwalk Empire	Nominated	
2013	Outstanding Cast in a Motion Picture	12 Years a Slave	Nominated	
2021	Outstanding Ensemble in a Drama Series	Lovecraft Country	Nominated	

=== Critics Choice Awards ===
Year	Category	Nominated work	Result	Ref.
2021	Best Supporting Actor in a Drama Series	Lovecraft Country	Won	

=== Gotham Awards ===
Year	Category	Nominated work	Result	Ref.
2009	Best Ensemble Cast	Life During Wartime	Nominated	

=== Independent Spirit Awards ===
Year	Category	Nominated work	Result	Ref.
2015	Robert Altman Award	Inherent Vice	Won	

== Miscellaneous awards ==
=== Black Reel Awards ===
Year	Category	Nominated work	Result	Ref.
2014	Outstanding Supporting Actor in a Motion Picture	The Gambler	Nominated	
2015	Outstanding Actor in a Limited Series or Movie	The Spoils Before Dying	Nominated	
2015	Outstanding Supporting Actor, TV Movie or Limited Series	Bessie	Nominated	
2017	Outstanding Supporting Actor, TV Movie or Limited Series	The Night Of	Nominated	
2019	Outstanding Supporting Actor, TV Movie or Limited Series	When They See Us	Nominated	
2020	Outstanding Supporting Actor, Drama Series	Lovecraft Country	Won	

=== NAACP Image Award ===
Year	Category	Nominated work	Result	Ref.
2007	Outstanding Actor in a Drama Series	The Wire	Nominated	
2009	Outstanding Supporting Actor in a Drama Series	The Wire	Nominated	
2014	Outstanding Actor in a Drama Series	Boardwalk Empire	Nominated	
2016	Outstanding Supporting Actor in a Drama Series	Bessie	Nominated	
2021	Outstanding Supporting Actor in a Drama Series	Lovecraft Country	Nominated	

=== Satellite Award ===
Year	Category	Nominated work	Result	Ref.
2015	Best Supporting Actor – Series, Miniseries or TV Film	Bessie	Nominated	
