= List of awards and nominations received by Bradley Whitford =

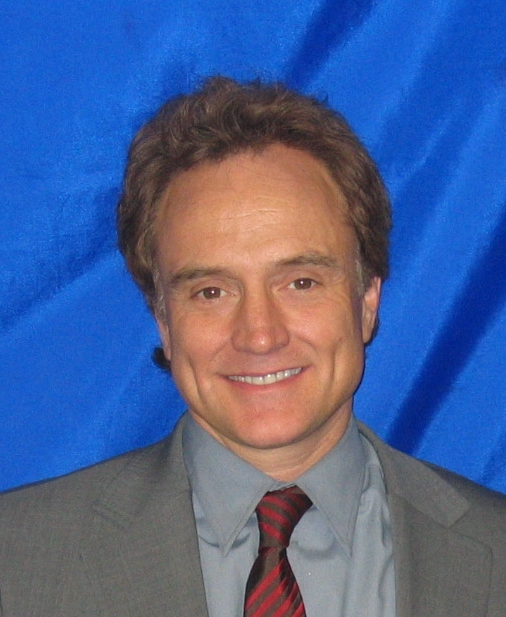
Bradley Whitford

Bradley Whitford is an American actor and producer. He is known for his portrayal of White House Deputy Chief of Staff Josh Lyman in the NBC television political drama The West Wing (1999–2006), Danny Tripp in Studio 60 on the Sunset Strip (2006-2007), Marcy in Transparent (2014-2019), and The Handmaid's Tale (2018–2025).

For his role in The West Wing he was nominated for three consecutive Primetime Emmy Awards from 2001 to 2003, winning in 2001. This role also earned him three consecutive Golden Globe Award nominations. In 2015, he won a second Primetime Emmy Award for his role as Marcy in Transparent and later garnered a fifth Primetime Emmy Award nomination for portraying Magnus Hirschfeld in the same series. Since 2018, Whitford has portrayed Commander Joseph Lawrence in Hulu’s dystopian drama The Handmaid's Tale, for which he won his third Primetime Emmy Award in 2019.

== Major associations ==
=== Actor Awards ===
Year	Category	Nominated work	Result	Ref.
2001	Outstanding Ensemble Cast in a Drama Series	The West Wing	Won	
2002	Outstanding Ensemble Cast in a Drama Series	The West Wing	Won	
2003	Outstanding Ensemble Cast in a Drama Series	The West Wing	Nominated	
2004	Outstanding Ensemble Cast in a Drama Series	The West Wing	Nominated	
2005	Outstanding Ensemble Cast in a Drama Series	The West Wing	Nominated	
2006	Outstanding Ensemble Cast in a Drama Series	The West Wing	Nominated	
2018	Outstanding Ensemble Cast in a Motion Picture	Get Out	Nominated	
2020	Outstanding Ensemble Cast in a Drama Series	The Handmaid's Tale	Nominated	
2022	Outstanding Ensemble Cast in a Drama Series	The Handmaid's Tale	Nominated	

=== Emmy Awards ===
Year	Category	Nominated work	Result	Ref.
Primetime Emmy Awards
2001	Outstanding Supporting Actor in a Drama Series	The West Wing	Won	
2002	Outstanding Supporting Actor in a Drama Series	The West Wing	Nominated	
2003	Outstanding Supporting Actor in a Drama Series	The West Wing	Nominated	
2015	Outstanding Guest Actor in a Comedy Series	Transparent	Won	
2016	Outstanding Guest Actor in a Comedy Series	Transparent	Nominated	
2019	Outstanding Guest Actor in a Drama Series	The Handmaid's Tale	Won	
2020	Outstanding Supporting Actor in a Drama Series	The Handmaid's Tale	Nominated	
2021	Outstanding Supporting Actor in a Drama Series	The Handmaid's Tale	Nominated	
2026	Outstanding Guest Actor in a Drama Series	The Diplomat	Nominated	

=== Golden Globe Awards ===
Year	Category	Nominated work	Result	Ref.
2001	Best Supporting Actor – Television	The West Wing	Nominated	
2002	Best Supporting Actor – Television	The West Wing	Nominated	
2003	Best Supporting Actor – Television	The West Wing	Nominated	

== Miscellaneous awards ==
Year	Association	Category	Nominated work	Result	Ref
2000	Viewers for Quality Television Award	Best Supporting Actor in a Quality Drama Series	The West Wing	Nominated	
2007	Satellite Awards	Best Actor in a Television Series – Drama	Studio 60 on the Sunset Strip	Nominated	
2008	Gemini Awards	Best Actor in a Dramatic Special or Miniseries	Burn Up	Nominated	
2013	Phoenix Film Critics Society Award	Best Cast	Saving Mr. Banks	Nominated	
2017	Seattle Film Critics Society Award	Best Ensemble	Get Out	Won	
2017	National Board of Review Award	Best Cast	Get Out	Won	
2017	San Diego Film Critics Society Award	Best Performance by an Ensemble	Get Out	Nominated	
