= List of awards and nominations received by Dennis Franz =

List of Dennis Franz's awards
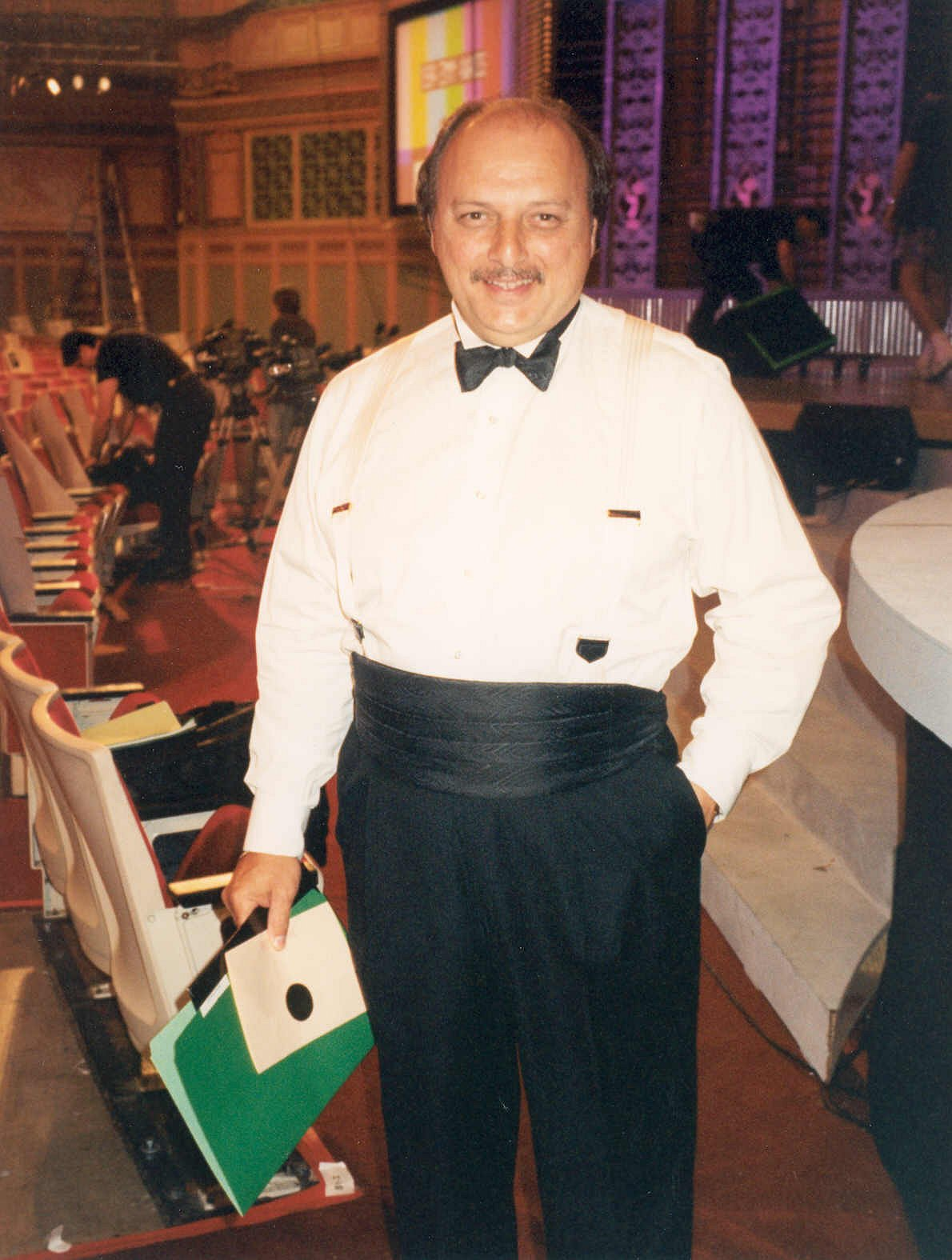
- Franz at the 1994 Primetime Emmy Awards rehearsal.
Award	Wins	Nominations
Golden Globe Awards	1	2
Primetime Emmy Awards	4	8
Screen Actors Guild Awards	3	14

The following is a list of awards and nominations received by Dennis Franz.

Franz is an American film and television actor. His most notable role is portraying Detective Andy Sipowicz on the television show NYPD Blue, a role that earned Franz a record-holding four Primetime Emmy Awards for Outstanding Lead Actor in a Drama Series awards. Along with the four Primetime Emmy Award wins, he also won one Golden Globe Award and three Screen Actors Guild Awards.

Along with his television awards for NYPD Blue, his final film role (to date), and City of Angels, Franz received his first Saturn Award nomination for Best Supporting Actor.

In 1999, Franz received a star on the Hollywood Walk of Fame.

== Motion Picture awards ==
=== Blockbuster Entertainment Awards ===
Year	Nominated work	Category	Result
1999	City of Angels	Favorite Supporting Actor - Drama/Romance	Nominated

=== Saturn Awards ===
Year	Nominated work	Category	Result
1999	City of Angels	Best Supporting Actor	Nominated

== Television awards ==
=== Daytime Emmy Awards ===
Year	Nominated work	Category	Result
1997	Mighty Ducks	Outstanding Performer in an Animated Program	Nominated

=== Golden Globe Awards ===
Year	Nominated work	Category	Result
1994	NYPD Blue	Best Supporting Actor – Series, Miniseries or Television Film	Nominated
1995	NYPD Blue	Best Actor – Television Series Drama	Won

=== Primetime Emmy Awards ===
Year	Nominated work	Category	Result
1994	NYPD Blue	Outstanding Lead Actor in a Drama Series	Won
1995	NYPD Blue	Outstanding Lead Actor in a Drama Series	Nominated
1996	NYPD Blue	Outstanding Lead Actor in a Drama Series	Won
1997	NYPD Blue	Outstanding Lead Actor in a Drama Series	Won
1998	NYPD Blue	Outstanding Lead Actor in a Drama Series	Nominated
1999	NYPD Blue	Outstanding Lead Actor in a Drama Series	Won
2000	NYPD Blue	Outstanding Lead Actor in a Drama Series	Nominated
2001	NYPD Blue	Outstanding Lead Actor in a Drama Series	Nominated

=== Prism Awards ===
Year	Nominated work	Category	Result
2004	NYPD Blue	Performance in a Drama Series	Won

=== Satellite Awards ===
Year	Nominated work	Category	Result
1997	NYPD Blue	Best Actor – Television Series Drama	Nominated
1998	NYPD Blue	Best Actor – Television Series Drama	Nominated

=== Screen Actors Guild Awards ===
Year	Nominated work	Category	Result
1995	NYPD Blue	Outstanding Performance by a Male Actor in a Drama Series	Won
1995	NYPD Blue	Outstanding Performance by an Ensemble in a Drama Series	Won
1996	NYPD Blue	Outstanding Performance by a Male Actor in a Drama Series	Nominated
1996	NYPD Blue	Outstanding Performance by an Ensemble in a Drama Series	Nominated
1997	NYPD Blue	Outstanding Performance by a Male Actor in a Drama Series	Won
1997	NYPD Blue	Outstanding Performance by an Ensemble in a Drama Series	Nominated
1998	NYPD Blue	Outstanding Performance by a Male Actor in a Drama Series	Nominated
1998	NYPD Blue	Outstanding Performance by an Ensemble in a Drama Series	Nominated
1999	NYPD Blue	Outstanding Performance by a Male Actor in a Drama Series	Nominated
1999	NYPD Blue	Outstanding Performance by an Ensemble in a Drama Series	Nominated
2000	NYPD Blue	Outstanding Performance by a Male Actor in a Drama Series	Nominated
2000	NYPD Blue	Outstanding Performance by an Ensemble in a Drama Series	Nominated
2001	NYPD Blue	Outstanding Performance by a Male Actor in a Drama Series	Nominated
2002	NYPD Blue	Outstanding Performance by a Male Actor in a Drama Series	Nominated

=== Television Critics Association Awards ===
Year	Nominated work	Category	Result
1997	NYPD Blue	Individual Achievement in Drama	Nominated
1998	NYPD Blue	Individual Achievement in Drama	Nominated
1999	NYPD Blue	Individual Achievement in Drama	Nominated

=== Viewers for Quality Television Awards ===
Year	Nominated work	Category	Result
1994	NYPD Blue	Best Actor in a Quality Drama Series	Won
1995	NYPD Blue	Best Actor in a Quality Drama Series	Nominated
1996	NYPD Blue	Best Actor in a Quality Drama Series	Won
1997	NYPD Blue	Best Actor in a Quality Drama Series	Won
1998	NYPD Blue	Best Actor in a Quality Drama Series	Won
1999	NYPD Blue	Best Actor in a Quality Drama Series	Won
2000	NYPD Blue	Best Actor in a Quality Drama Series	Nominated
