= List of awards and nominations received by Sônia Braga =

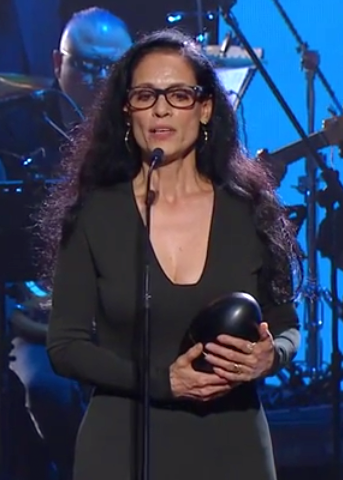
Braga at the Premios Fénix (2016)

This is a list of awards and nominations for Sonia Braga. Braga has been recognized with multiple awards and nominations for her work in film and television.

== Awards and nominations ==
Award	Year (Note: Indicates the year of ceremony. Each year is linked to the article about the awards held that year, wherever possible.)	Recipient or nominee	Category	Result	Ref.
BAFTA Awards	1981	Dona Flor and Her Two Husbands	Most Promising Newcomer to Leading Film Roles	Nominated	
Biarritz Film Festival	2016	Aquarius	Best Actress	Won	
Chlotrudis Society for Independent Film	2016	Aquarius	Best Actress	Nominated	
Grande Prêmio do Cinema Brasileiro	2017	Aquarius	Best Actress	Nominated	
Grande Prêmio do Cinema Brasileiro	2020	Bacurau	Best Supporting Actress	Nominated	
CinEuphoria Awards	2020		Career - Honorary Award	Won	
Dublin Film Critics' Circle	2017	Aquarius	Best Actress	Nominated	
Días de Cine Awards	2018	Aquarius	Best Actress	Nominated	
Gramado Film Festival	1981	I Love You	Best Actress	Won	
Gramado Film Festival	2001	Memórias Póstumas	Best Supporting Actress	Won	
Imagen Foundation Awards	2004	American Family	Best Supporting Actress in a Television Drama	Nominated	
Imagen Foundation Awards	2013	Meddling Mom	Best Actress/Television	Nominated	

== Film and television awards ==
=== BAFTA ===
Year	Category	Nominated work	Result	Ref.
1981	Most Promising Newcomer to Leading Film Roles	Dona Flor and Her Two Husbands	Nominated	

=== Golden Globe Award ===
Year	Category	Nominated work	Result	Ref.
1986	Best Supporting Actress – Motion Picture	Kiss of the Spider Woman	Nominated	
1989	Best Supporting Actress – Motion Picture	Moon Over Parador	Nominated	
1995	Best Supporting Actress – Series, Miniseries or Television Film	The Burning Season	Nominated	

=== Gramado Film Festival ===
Year	Category	Nominated work	Result	Ref.
1981	Best Actress	I Love You	Won	
2001	Best Supporting Actress	Posthumous Memories	Won	
2016	Oscarito Trophy	Honorary award	Won	

=== Cinema Brazil Grand Prize ===
Year	Category	Nominated work	Result	Ref.
2020	Best Supporting Actress	Bacurau	Nominated	

=== Fenix Awards ===
Year	Category	Nominated work	Result	Ref.
2016	Best Actress	Aquarius	Won	

=== Havana Film Festival ===
Year	Category	Nominated work	Result	Ref.
2016	Best Actress	Aquarius	Won	

=== Mar del Plata International Film Festival ===
Year	Category	Nominated work	Result	Ref.
2016	Silver Astor - Best Actress	Aquarius	Won	

=== Lima Film Festival ===
Year	Category	Nominated work	Result	Ref.
2016	Best Actress	Aquarius	Won	

=== Platino Awards ===
Year	Category	Nominated work	Result	Ref.
2014	Honorary Platino Award	Honorary recognition	Won	
2017	Best Actress	Aquarius	Won	

=== Primetime Emmy Awards ===
Year	Category	Nominated work	Result	Ref.
1995	Outstanding Supporting Actress in a Limited Series or Movie	The Burning Season	Nominated	

=== San Diego Film Critics Society Awards ===
Year	Category	Nominated work	Result	Ref.
2016	Best Actress	Aquarius	Won	

== Other prizes and nominations ==
Year	Award	Category	Work	Result
1996	Lone Star Film & Television Awards	Best TV Supporting Actress	Streets of Laredo	Won
1996	Bravo Award	Outstanding Individual Performance in Made for TV Movie or Mini-Series	Streets of Laredo	Nominated
2004	Imagen Awards	Best Supporting Actress in a Television Drama	American Family	Nominated
2013	Gen Art Film Festival	Cast Collaboration Award	Emoticon	Won
2013	Imagen Awards	Best Actress/Television	Meddling Mom	Nominated
