= List of awards and nominations received by James Spader =

James Spader awards and nominations
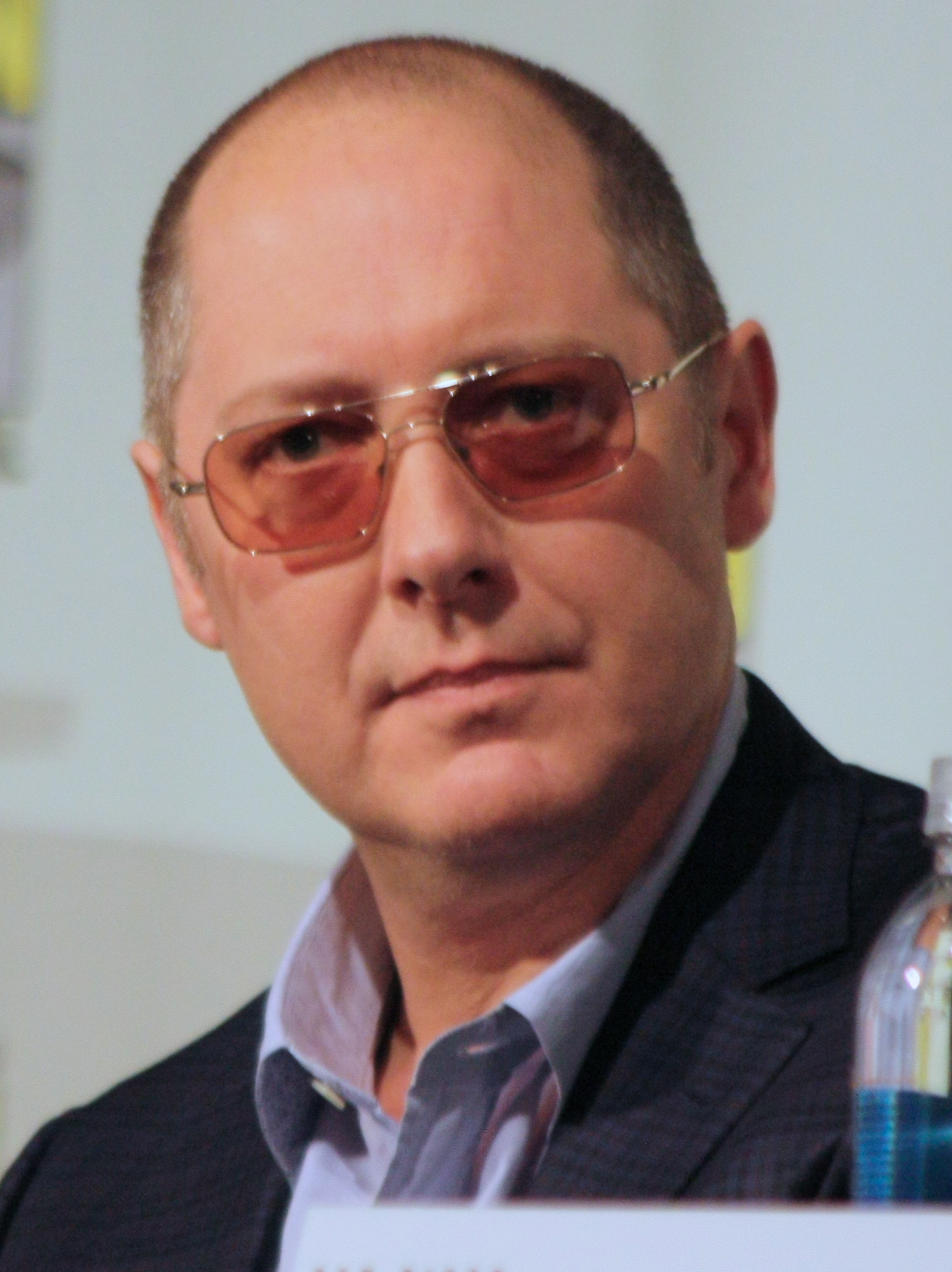
- Spader in 2013
Awards and nominations
Award	Wins	Nominations
Emmy Awards	3	4
Golden Globe Awards	0	3
SAG Awards	0	10

Totals (Note: Certain award groups do not simply award one winner. They acknowledge several different recipients, have runners-up, and have third place. Since this is a specific recognition and is different from losing an award, runner-up mentions are considered wins in this award tally. For simplification and to avoid errors, each award in this list has been presumed to have had a prior nomination.)
- Wins: 3
- Nominations: 20

The following is a list of awards and nominations received by James Spader

James Spader is an American actor known for his roles in film and television. He has received various accolades including three Primetime Emmy Awards as well as nominations for three Golden Globe Awards and ten Screen Actors Guild Awards.

Spader started his career as a teen actor before transitioning into mature roles with his performance in the Steven Soderbergh erotic drama Sex, Lies and Videotape (1989) for which he won the Cannes Film Festival Prize for Best Actor as well as a nomination for the Independent Spirit Award for Best Male Lead and the Chicago Film Critics Association Award for Best Actor.

Spader portrayed attorney Alan Shore on the ABC legal drama series The Practice (2003–2004) for which he won the Primetime Emmy Award for Outstanding Lead Actor in a Drama Series. He reprised the role in the ABC legal comedy-drama series Boston Legal (2004–2008) for which he won another two Primetime Emmy Awards for Outstanding Lead Actor in a Drama Series, as well as nominations for a Golden Globe Award for Best Actor – Television Series Drama and four Screen Actor Guild Awards for Outstanding Actor (once in a Comedy Series and three times in a Drama Series).

He returned to television playing criminal mastermind Raymond Reddington in the NBC crime thriller series The Blacklist (2013–2023). The role earned him nominations for two Golden Globe Awards for Best Actor – Television Series Drama. He also played Robert California in the NBC comedy series The Office (2010–2011) for which he was nominated for the Screen Actors Guild Award for Outstanding Ensemble in a Comedy Series.

== Major associations ==
=== Emmy Awards ===
Year	Category	Nominated work	Result	Ref.
Primetime Emmy Awards
2004	Outstanding Lead Actor in a Drama Series	The Practice (episode: "Mr. Shore Goes to Town")	Won	
2005	Outstanding Lead Actor in a Drama Series	Boston Legal (episode: "Death Be Not Proud")	Won	
2007	Outstanding Lead Actor in a Drama Series	Boston Legal (episode: "Angel of Death")	Won	
2008	Outstanding Lead Actor in a Drama Series	Boston Legal (episode: "The Court Supreme")	Nominated	

=== Golden Globe Awards ===
Year	Category	Nominated work	Result	Ref.
2004	Best Actor – Television Series Drama	Boston Legal	Nominated	
2013	Best Actor – Television Series Drama	The Blacklist	Nominated	
2014	Best Actor – Television Series Drama	The Blacklist	Nominated	

=== Screen Actors Guild Awards ===
Year	Category	Nominated work	Result	Ref.
2005	Outstanding Male Actor in a Comedy Series	Boston Legal (season one)	Nominated	
2005	Outstanding Ensemble in a Comedy Series	Boston Legal (season one)	Nominated	
2006	Outstanding Male Actor in a Drama Series	Boston Legal (season two)	Nominated	
2006	Outstanding Ensemble in a Drama Series	Boston Legal (season two)	Nominated	
2007	Outstanding Male Actor in a Drama Series	Boston Legal (season three)	Nominated	
2007	Outstanding Ensemble in a Drama Series	Boston Legal (season three)	Nominated	
2008	Outstanding Male Actor in a Drama Series	Boston Legal (season four)	Nominated	
2008	Outstanding Ensemble in a Drama Series	Boston Legal (season four)	Nominated	
2011	Outstanding Ensemble in a Comedy Series	The Office (season eight)	Nominated	
2012	Outstanding Cast in a Motion Picture	Lincoln	Nominated	

== Miscellaneous awards ==
Organizations	Year	Category	Work	Result	Ref.
Cannes Film Festival	1989	Best Actor	Sex, Lies, and Videotape	Won	
Chicago Film Critics Association	1990	Best Actor	Sex, Lies, and Videotape	Nominated	
Independent Spirit Awards	1990	Best Male Lead	Sex, Lies, and Videotape	Nominated	
Monte-Carlo Television Festival	2009	Outstanding Actor – Drama Series	Boston Legal	Nominated	
People's Choice Awards	2005	Favorite Male Television Star	Boston Legal	Nominated	
Satellite Awards	2005	Best Actor – Television Series Drama	Boston Legal	Nominated	
Satellite Awards	2005	Best Actor – Television Series Musical or Comedy	Boston Legal	Nominated	
Satellite Awards	2006	Best Actor – Television Series Musical or Comedy	Boston Legal	Won	
Saturn Awards	1988	Best Actor	Jack's Back	Nominated	
Saturn Awards	1994	Best Supporting Actor	Wolf	Nominated	
Saturn Awards	2013	Best Actor on Television	The Blacklist	Nominated	
Southeastern Film Critics Association	2012	Best Cast	Lincoln	Won	
