= List of awards and nominations received by Jimmy Smits =

List of Jimmy Smits's awards
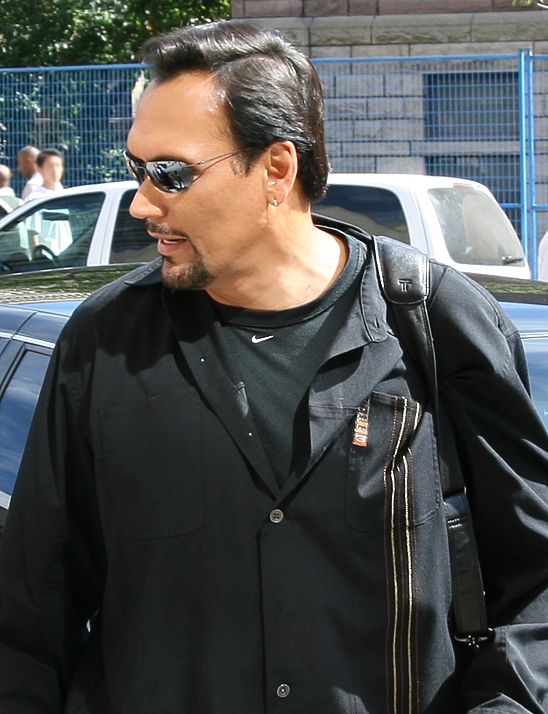
- Smits at the 2007 Toronto International Film Festival.
Award	Wins	Nominations
Golden Globe Awards	1	4
Primetime Emmy Awards	1	12
Satellite Awards	1	4
Screen Actors Guild Awards	1	11

The following is a list of awards and nominations received by Jimmy Smits.

Smits is the recipient of one Golden Globe Award for his role on NYPD Blue as well as one Primetime Emmy Award (from a total twelve nominations) for L.A. Law. Throughout his career on television, he has garnered eleven Screen Actors Guild Awards nominations, winning once in the Outstanding Performance by an Ensemble in a Drama Series in 1995 for NYPD Blue.

The 2000s saw a resurgence in popularity on television for Smits. He starred on The West Wing from 2004 to 2006 and won an ALMA Award for his role. And in 2008, guest starred on Dexter, for which he received critical acclaim, being nominated for his twelfth Primetime Emmy Award and winning a Saturn Award for Best Guest Starring Role on Television.

From 2012 to 2014, Smits starred in Sons of Anarchy.

== Motion picture awards ==
=== Independent Spirit Awards ===
Year	Nominated work	Category	Result
1996	My Family	Best Male Lead	Nominated

== Television awards ==
=== ALMA Awards ===
Year	Nominated work	Category	Result
2006	The West Wing	Outstanding Actor in a Drama Series	Won
2009	Dexter	Outstanding Actor in a Drama Series	Nominated

=== Critics' Choice Television Awards ===
Year	Nominated work	Category	Result
2013	Sons of Anarchy	Best Guest Performer in a Drama Series	Nominated

=== Golden Globe Awards ===
Year	Nominated work	Category	Result
1991	L.A. Law	Best Supporting Actor – Series, Miniseries or Television Film	Nominated
1996	NYPD Blue	Best Actor – Television Series Drama	Won
1997	NYPD Blue	Best Actor – Television Series Drama	Nominated
1999	NYPD Blue	Best Actor – Television Series Drama	Nominated

=== NAACP Image Awards ===
Year	Nominated work	Category	Result
2008	Cane	Outstanding Actor in a Drama Series	Nominated

=== Primetime Emmy Awards ===
Year	Nominated work	Category	Result
1987	L.A. Law	Outstanding Supporting Actor in a Drama Series	Nominated
1988	L.A. Law	Outstanding Supporting Actor in a Drama Series	Nominated
1989	L.A. Law	Outstanding Supporting Actor in a Drama Series	Nominated
1990	L.A. Law	Outstanding Supporting Actor in a Drama Series	Won
1991	L.A. Law	Outstanding Supporting Actor in a Drama Series	Nominated
1992	L.A. Law	Outstanding Supporting Actor in a Drama Series	Nominated
1995	NYPD Blue	Outstanding Lead Actor in a Drama Series	Nominated
1996	NYPD Blue	Outstanding Lead Actor in a Drama Series	Nominated
1997	NYPD Blue	Outstanding Lead Actor in a Drama Series	Nominated
1998	NYPD Blue	Outstanding Lead Actor in a Drama Series	Nominated
1999	NYPD Blue	Outstanding Lead Actor in a Drama Series	Nominated
2009	Dexter	Outstanding Guest Actor in a Drama Series	Nominated

=== Satellite Awards ===
Year	Nominated work	Category	Result
1998	NYPD Blue	Best Actor – Television Series Drama	Won
1999	NYPD Blue	Best Actor – Television Series Drama	Nominated
2008	Dexter	Best Supporting Actor – Series, Miniseries or Television Film	Nominated
2013	Sons of Anarchy	Best Supporting Actor – Series, Miniseries or Television Film	Nominated
2014	Sons of Anarchy	Best Supporting Actor – Series, Miniseries or Television Film	Nominated

=== Saturn Awards ===
Year	Nominated work	Category	Result
2009	Dexter	Best Guest Starring Role on Television	Won

=== Screen Actors Guild Awards ===
Year	Nominated work	Category	Result
1995	NYPD Blue	Outstanding Ensemble in a Drama Series	Won
1996	NYPD Blue	Outstanding Ensemble in a Drama Series	Nominated
1996	NYPD Blue	Outstanding Male Actor in a Drama Series	Nominated
1997	NYPD Blue	Outstanding Male Actor in a Drama Series	Nominated
1997	NYPD Blue	Outstanding Ensemble in a Drama Series	Nominated
1998	NYPD Blue	Outstanding Male Actor in a Drama Series	Nominated
1998	NYPD Blue	Outstanding Ensemble in a Drama Series	Nominated
1999	NYPD Blue	Outstanding Male Actor in a Drama Series	Nominated
1999	NYPD Blue	Outstanding Ensemble in a Drama Series	Nominated
2006	The West Wing	Outstanding Ensemble in a Drama Series	Nominated
2009	Dexter	Outstanding Ensemble in a Drama Series	Nominated

=== Viewers for Quality Television Awards ===
Year	Nominated work	Category	Result
1990	L.A. Law	Best Supporting Actor in a Quality Drama Series	Won
1991	L.A. Law	Best Supporting Actor in a Quality Drama Series	Nominated
1997	NYPD Blue	Best Actor in a Quality Drama Series	Nominated
