= 2013 Deauville American Film Festival =

- Festival poster
- Opening film: Behind the Candelabra
- Closing film: Snowpiercer
- Location: Deauville, France
- Hosted by: Deauville American Film Festival Group
- No. of films: 76 feature films
- Festival date: August 30, 2013–September 8, 2013
- Language: International
- Website: www.festival-deauville.com

The 39th Deauville American Film Festival took place at Deauville, France from August 30 to September 8, 2013. Steven Soderbergh's drama film Behind the Candelabra served as the opening night film. Snowpiercer by Bong Joon-ho was the closing night film of the festival. The Grand Prix was awarded to Night Moves by Kelly Reichardt.

Complete lineup for the festival was announced on July 19, 2013, including episodes from Television shows for the Television section at the festival. Electronic music duo Justice was given Carte blanche section to show nine of their favourite American films to the festival audience. The festival paid tribute to Cate Blanchett, Nicolas Cage, Larry Clark, Gale Anne Hurd and John Travolta and hosted retrospective of their films. The festival honoured American actor, singer, dancer, and comedian Danny Kaye with Deauville Legend award.

== Juries ==
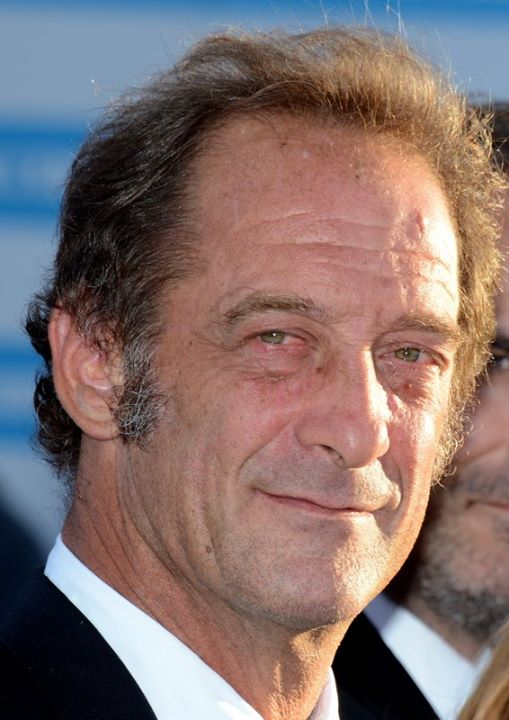
Vincent Lindon, Main Jury President

=== Main Competition ===
- Vincent Lindon: French actor and film director (President of Jury)
- Lou Doillon: French model, singer, and actress
- Jean Echenoz: French writer
- Hélène Fillières: French actress, film director and screenwriter
- Xavier Giannoli: French film director, screenwriter and producer
- Famke Janssen: Dutch actress, director, screenwriter and former fashion model
- Pierre Lescure: French journalist and television executive
- Bruno Nuytten: French cinematographer and director
- Rebecca Zlotowski: French film director and screenwriter

=== Cartier revelation jury ===
- Valérie Donzelli: French actress, director and screenwriter (President of Jury)
- Laurence Arné: French actress
- Vincent Lacoste: French actor
- Géraldine Maillet: French novelist, screenwriter and director
- Yoann Lemoine: French music video director, graphic designer and singer-songwriter

== Programme ==
=== Competition ===
- A Single Shot by David M. Rosenthal
- Ain't Them Bodies Saints by David Lowery
- All Is Lost by J. C. Chandor
- Blue Caprice by Alexandre Moors
- Blue Ruin by Jeremy Saulnier
- Breathe In by Drake Doremus
- Fruitvale Station by Ryan Coogler
- Lily by Matt Creed
- Night Moves by Kelly Reichardt
- Short Term 12 by Destin Daniel Cretton
- Stand Clear of the Closing Doors by Sam Fleischner
- Sweetwater by Logan Miller
- The Retrieval by Chris Eska
- We Are What We Are by Jim Mickle

=== Les Premières (Premieres) ===
- Behind the Candelabra by Steven Soderbergh
- Blue Jasmine by Woody Allen
- Joe by David Gordon Green
- Killing Season by Mark Steven Johnson
- The Butler by Lee Daniels
- Lovelace by Rob Epstein and Jeffrey Friedman
- Marfa Girl by Larry Clark
- Pain & Gain by Michael Bay
- Parkland by Peter Landesman
- Planes by Klay Hall
- Snowpiercer by Bong Joon-ho
- Sunlight Jr. by Laurie Collyer
- The Frozen Ground by Scott Walker
- Charlie Countryman by Fredrik Bond
- The Wait by M. Blash
- Upstream Color by Shane Carruth
- Very Good Girls by Naomi Foner Gyllenhaal
- White House Down by Roland Emmerich
- Wrong Cops by Quentin Dupieux

=== Les Docs De L'Oncle Sam (Uncle Sam's Doc) ===
- Dancing in Jaffa by Hilla Medalia
- Inequality for All by Jacob Kornbluth
- Our Nixon by Penny Lane
- Seduced and Abandoned by James Toback
- 20 Feet from Stardom by Morgan Neville

=== La Nuit américaine (American cinema overview) ===
- Adaptation by Spike Jonze
- Another Day in Paradise by Larry Clark
- Armageddon by Michael Bay
- Babel by Alejandro González Iñárritu
- Bad Lieutenant: Port of Call New Orleans by Werner Herzog
- Blow Out by Brian De Palma
- Bringing Out the Dead by Martin Scorsese
- Bully by Larry Clark
- Elizabeth by Shekhar Kapur
- Get Shorty by Barry Sonnenfeld
- Hairspray by Adam Shankman
- Indiana Jones and the Kingdom of the Crystal Skull by Steven Spielberg
- I'm Not There by Todd Haynes
- Ken Park by Larry Clark and Edward Lachman
- Kids by Larry Clark
- Leaving Las Vegas by Mike Figgis
- Lord of War by Andrew Niccol
- Primary Colors by Mike Nichols
- Pulp Fiction by Quentin Tarantino
- The Aviator by Martin Scorsese
- The Curious Case of Benjamin Button by David Fincher
- The Terminator by James Cameron
- Veronica Guerin by Joel Schumacher
- Wassup Rockers by Larry Clark
- Wild at Heart by David Lynch

=== Carte blanche ===
- Blade Runner by Ridley Scott
- Die Hard by John McTiernan
- Dog Day Afternoon by Sidney Lumet
- Escape from Alcatraz by Don Siegel
- Eyes Wide Shut by Stanley Kubrick
- Ferris Bueller's Day Off by John Hughes
- Happiness by Todd Solondz
- The Fugitive by Andrew Davis
- Youth in Revolt by Miguel Arteta

=== Hommage Deauville Legend (Tribute Deauville Legend) ===
- The Secret Life of Walter Mitty by Norman Z. McLeod
- On the Riviera by Walter Lang
- White Christmas by Michael Curtiz

=== Television ===
- Bates Motel by Carlton Cuse, Kerry Ehrin and Anthony Cipriano
- The Curse Of Edgar by Marc Dugain
- Once Upon a Time by Edward Kitsis and Adam Horowitz
- The Following by Kevin Williamson

== Awards ==
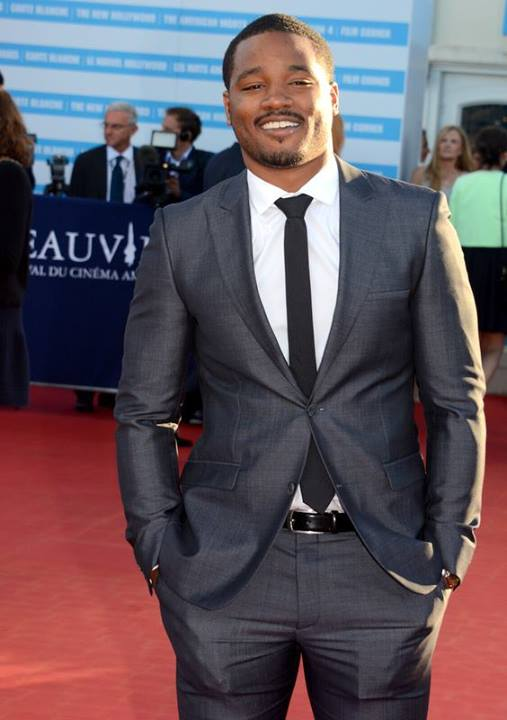
Ryan Coogler, won Cartier Revelation Prize and Audience Award at the festival.

The festival awarded the following awards:

- Grand Prix (Grand Special Prize): Night Moves by Kelly Reichardt
- Prix du Jury (Jury Special Prize): All Is Lost by J. C. Chandor and Stand Clear of the Closing Doors by Sam Fleischner
- Prix du Public (Audience Award): Fruitvale Station by Ryan Coogler
- Prix de la Critique Internationale (International Critics' prize): The Retrieval by Chris Eska
- Prix Michel d'Ornano (Michel d'Ornano Award for debut French film): Me, Myself and Mum by Guillaume Gallienne
- Prix de la Révélation Cartier (Cartier Revelation Prize): Fruitvale Station by Ryan Coogler
- Lucien Barrière Prize for Literature:
  - Canada by Richard Ford
- Tributes:
  - Cate Blanchett
  - Nicolas Cage
  - Larry Clark
  - Gale Anne Hurd
  - John Travolta
- Deauville Legend:
  - Danny Kaye
