= The Wait (2013 film) =

- Directed by: M. Blash
- Written by: M. Blash
- Produced by: Ryan Crisman; Neil Kopp; Riel Roch Decter
- Starring: Jena Malone; Chloë Sevigny; Luke Grimes
- Cinematography: Kasper Tuxen
- Edited by: Jessica Brunetto
- Production company: Olympus Pictures
- Distributed by: Monterey Media
- Release dates: March 10, 2013 (SXSW); January 10, 2014 (U.S.)
- Running time: 96 minutes
- Country: United States
- Language: English
- Box office: $2,480

The Wait is a 2013 American independent drama film written and directed by M. Blash, and starring Jena Malone, Chloë Sevigny, Luke Grimes, Devon Gearhart, Michael O'Keefe, and Josh Hamilton. It follows two young women who are instructed by a phone call from a psychic to keep their recently deceased mother in their home so that she can be resurrected. The film was shot in several locations in the state of Oregon.

== Plot ==
As a wildfire encroaches on a rural community in central Oregon, adult sisters Angela and Emma mourn their mother, who has just died in her house after a protracted illness. Moments after her death, Emma receives a bizarre phone call from a woman who tells her that their mother will be resurrected so long as they keep her body in the home. Angela swiftly dismisses the idea, but relents with Emma's persistence that they wait before calling authorities to remove the body.

Emma covers their mother's body in a sheet and closes the windows in the house in an effort to prevent her mother's soul from escaping. Ian, the girls' teenaged brother, flees the home on his skateboard. He visits his friend Sam, Ian smokes marijuana, and he and Sam briefly talk. Ian apologizes for rebuffing a sexual encounter they had several days prior; Sam refuses to acknowledge the incident, and Ian leaves angrily. Later, Emma's daughter Karen questions her about why her grandmother's body has not been taken from the home. Emma, believing the psychic's claim, explains that her mother's resurrection will make them famous.

Later that night, Emma finds Angela going through their mother's will. The two get into a fight when Emma realizes Angela has covertly called the coroner to remove the body in the middle of the night. When the coroner arrives, Emma lies and tells them that Angela, struggling emotionally with their mother's ailing health, erroneously made the call, and that their mother is not dead. The next day, Angela meets Ben, a young man staying with his father nearby, at the grocery store. She later asks him to stargaze with her that night. Emma becomes increasingly engrossed in superstitions that she believes will bring her mother back to life, including planting marigolds in a cave and performing dances. She decorates the home with balloons and streamers to welcome her mother when she reanimates.

Ian returns to Sam's house to retrieve his skateboard, but is met by Sam's father, who tells him he has left with the rest of the family to Portland. Meanwhile, Angela and Ben go to stargaze, hoping to glimpse Mars, but are unable to due to the smoke and ash from the fire. Instead, they return to Angela's home and talk over beers. The next morning, Emma and Karen go into town, where both get haircuts, and Emma a manicure, in preparation for a party they plan to hold when their mother/grandmother is resurrected. Emma sees a listing for puppies in town, and buys the runt of the litter as a gift for her mother.

Angela and Ben have a picnic together, followed by another date that evening which culminates in a sexual encounter. They both become intoxicated, and run through the woods together. The next morning, Emma's husband Henry arrives, and the two go boating on the lake. Emma conceals from him that her mother has died. The next morning, Emma finds Ian playing a viral video that features the audio of the woman who called her several days before, and realizes the call was a prank. Simultaneously, Angela witnesses an apparition of their mother in the window outside their home. She becomes ill and vomits. Later, while Ian watches the smoke from the fire inside a cave, Emma is visited by her mother, who knocks at the front door.

== Cast ==
- Jena Malone as Angela
- Chloë Sevigny as Emma
- Luke Grimes as Ben
- Devon Gearhart as Ian
- Michael O'Keefe as Ben's Dad
- Josh Hamilton as Sam's Dad
- Lana Green as Karen
- Henry Gummer as Henry
- Patricia Arquette as Psychic (voice)

== Production ==
The Wait was written and directed by M. Blash. He described the film as being

about the altered states brought on by grief... at the time I was writing the film, my mother was revisiting the small town in Hawaii where she grew up. I felt like I was watching my mother transform into a teenage girl again. I was no longer her son, but suddenly just a friend. This sudden transformation in our relationship inspired many of the elaborate fantasies depicted in the film. Some people have delayed reactions to trauma. I wanted to explore that "pause" in life, that in-between space, where people act out of the most extreme emotions."

Principal photography took place in central Oregon in the cities of Bend, Black Butte Ranch, and Sisters.

== Release ==
=== Festivals ===
The film premiered at South by Southwest in Austin, Texas in the spring of 2013, and went on to play at the following festivals:

- 2013 Buenos Aires International Festival of Independent Cinema
- 2013 American Film Festival in Wrocław, Poland
- 2013 Sitges International Film Festival in Catalonia
- 2013 Lake Placid Center for the Arts Film Festival
- 2013 Possible Worlds Festival of American & Canadian Cinema Film Festival
- 2013 Deauville American Film Festival
- 2013 Ars Independent Katowice Film Festival
- 2013 Stony Brook Film Festival
- 2013 Randevu İstanbul Film Festivali

=== Box office ===
In September 2013, Monterey Media bought the United States distribution rights to release the film in the United States and Canada. The film had a limited release on January 10, 2014, initially screening in one theater, before expanding to a total of three. The film closed its theatrical run February 2, 2014, grossing a total of $2,480, averaging $626 per theater.

== Soundtrack ==
The film features a rarely heard song by The Cure, "Sugar Girl", a b-side to the UK 12" single for "Just Like Heaven".
