= Night Moves (2013 film) =

- Theatrical release poster
- Directed by: Kelly Reichardt
- Written by: Jonathan Raymond; Kelly Reichardt
- Produced by: Saemi Kim; Neil Kopp; Chris Maybach; Anish Savjani; Rodrigo Teixeira
- Starring: Jesse Eisenberg; Dakota Fanning; Peter Sarsgaard; Alia Shawkat; Logan Miller; Kai Lennox; Katherine Waterston; James LeGros
- Cinematography: Christopher Blauvelt
- Edited by: Kelly Reichardt
- Music by: Jeff Grace
- Production companies: Maybach Film Productions; Filmscience; Tipping Point Productions; RT Features
- Distributed by: Cinedigm
- Release dates: August 31, 2013 (Venice); May 30, 2014 (United States)
- Running time: 113 minutes
- Country: United States
- Language: English
- Box office: $858,513

Night Moves is a 2013 American drama thriller film directed by Kelly Reichardt and written by Reichardt and Jonathan Raymond, starring Jesse Eisenberg, Dakota Fanning, Peter Sarsgaard, Alia Shawkat, and James LeGros. The film follows three radical environmentalists who plot to blow up a dam. It was shown in the main competition section of the 70th Venice International Film Festival, at the 2013 Toronto International Film Festival and at 2013 Deauville American Film Festival, where it won Grand Prix of the festival.

== Plot ==
Radical environmentalists Josh and Dena buy a boat and tow it long-distance to meet Harmon, who served in the military. The three buy fertilizer, assemble a bomb and load it onto the boat, planning to bomb a dam they believe is harming the environment. At night, they take the boat to the dam, arm the bomb, and escape. After the explosion, Harmon says goodbye and drives away. Josh and Dena are stopped by the police, but evade suspicion. The three agree not to contact each other again.

Josh returns to the organic farm where he lives and works. The other people living on the farm discuss the explosion; the media reports that a man who was camping near the dam is missing. Harmon calls Josh and tells him that Dena is worried. Concerned that she will go to the police, Josh agrees to talk to her. Dena admits her feelings of guilt and, when pressed by Josh, does not rule out talking to the police. Harmon tells Josh that Dena needs to be silenced.

The other people living on the farm suspect Josh of involvement with the bombing and ask him to leave. He learns that the missing man drowned in the flood caused by the explosion. Fearing that Dena will talk to the police, he surprises her at the spa where she works; he tries to warn her not to talk, but she attacks him and runs. He finds her hiding in one of the saunas, where he strangles her to death.

Josh drives overnight and in the morning calls Harmon in tears to tell him that Dena is dead. Harmon tells Josh to disappear and never contact him again. Josh destroys his phone and begins to apply for a job at a camp supply store, but stops after seeing all the personal details required by the application.

== Cast ==
- Jesse Eisenberg as Josh
- Dakota Fanning as Dena
- Peter Sarsgaard as Harmon
- Alia Shawkat as Surprise
- Logan Miller as Dylan
- Kai Lennox as Sean
- Suyash Pachauri as OTT
- Katherine Waterston as Anne
- Barry Del Sherman as Corser
- James LeGros as Feed Factory Clerk
- Jackie Apodaca as Woman at Spa
- Griffin Newman as Middle Manager

== Production ==
Night Moves was shot on location in southern Oregon in the fall of 2012 over thirty days, using locations including the Chief Miwaleta Park in Azalea. The dam in the film is the Galesville Reservoir in the Klamath Mountains. The film was dedicated in memory of production designer David Doernberg.

== Controversy ==
Edward R. Pressman Film filed a lawsuit in September 2012, demanding that filming cease because of too many similarities to Edward Abbey's novel The Monkey Wrench Gang, planned to be adapted into an authorized film by Henry Joost and Ariel Schulman. The lawsuit charged:

By way of example only, both works feature the targeting of a dam for destruction by means of ammonium fertilizer-laden boats. In the Novel, the principal bomb-maker is a beer-guzzling veteran who served overseas as a Green Beret, where he acquired his knowledge of explosives. The bomb-maker in Night Moves is a beer-guzzling veteran who served overseas as a U.S. Marine, where he acquired his knowledge of explosives. Both the Novel and Night Moves also feature a 20-something woman who starts out as a companion of another member of the group but develops a sexual relationship with the bomb-making veteran, despite his initial objections to her participation in the group's illegal activities.

The case was resolved through "negotiations behind the scenes", according to The Hollywood Reporter, and the action was dismissed on February 1, 2013.

== Reception ==
Night Moves received positive reviews, currently holding an 86% rating on review aggregator website Rotten Tomatoes based on 151 reviews, with an average rating of 7.2/10; the consensus states: "A uniquely character-driven thriller with a finely composed cast and some outstanding direction from Kelly Reichardt, Night Moves bolsters its thought-provoking themes with compelling drama." On Metacritic, based on 36 critics, the film has a 75/100 rating.

Peter Bradshaw of The Guardian awarded the film four out of five, praising the "three very closed and opaque performances: the direction does not offer up the film's meaning easily. Eisenberg is never a very demonstrative actor, but here he really is very withdrawn, giving an impression of a guy who has learned to tamp down his emotions. Fanning's Dena, too, is under control, again because she is aware of what is at stake and because she wishes to be taken seriously." Justin Chang of Variety commented on the film's pacing as uneven, noting: "Night Moves might have been close to perfect had it clocked in at a tight 80 minutes or so, rather than pushing on for another half-hour. While the fallout is impressively handled in its own way, the suspense and momentum inevitably dissipate as the story slowly moves toward a credulity-straining climax. Still, a feeling of deflation is entirely in keeping with the note Reichardt means to end on, and she finds just the right closing shot with which to convey exactly what her characters have and haven’t accomplished."
