= Roundabout Theatre Company =

American non-profit theater company

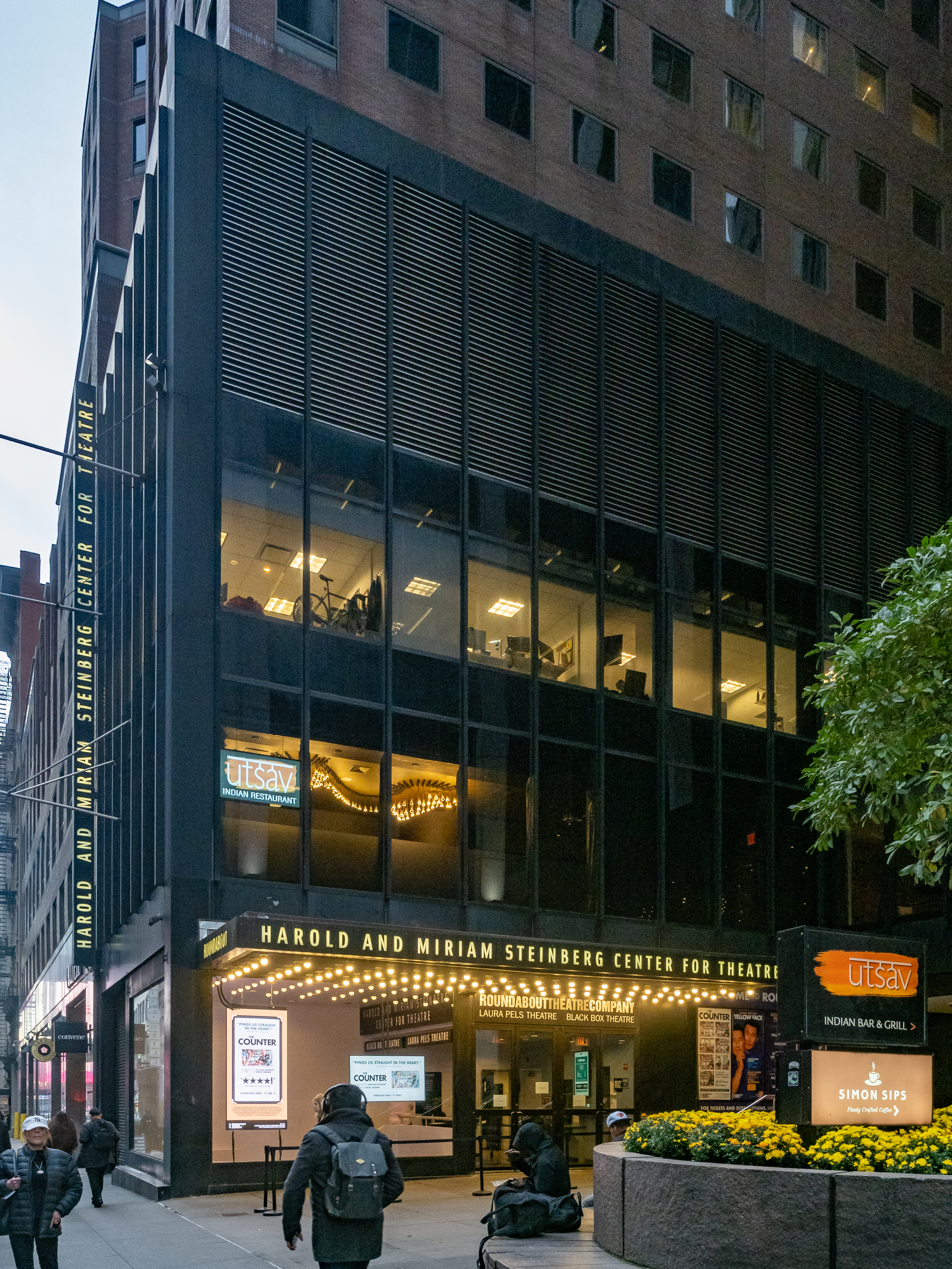
- Harold and Miriam Steinberg Center, October 17, 2024.
- Formation: 1965
- Type: Theatre group
- Location: Midtown Manhattan, New York City, US
- Artistic director: Christopher Ashley
- Website: roundabouttheatre.org

The Roundabout Theatre Company is a non-profit theatre company based in Midtown Manhattan, New York City, affiliated with the League of Resident Theatres.

== History ==
The company was founded in 1965 by Gene Feist, Michael Fried and Elizabeth Owens. Originally housed at a Chelsea, Manhattan, grocery store, on 26th Street, it moved to the nearby 23rd Street Theatre in 1972, performing there until their lease expired in 1984. Following that, Roundabout leased the theatre space at 44 Union Square until that lease expired in 1990. The company then moved into the Criterion Center in Times Square, a two-auditorium complex. Roundabout used the larger Stage Right space as a small Tony Award-eligible theater while the smaller second theater became the first version of the Laura Pels Theatre. Notable productions during Roundabout's tenure at the Criterion include the 1993 revival of Eugene O'Neill's Anna Christie (featuring Liam Neeson and Natasha Richardson in their Broadway debuts), the 1995 revival of Stephen Sondheim's Company, and the 1997 revival of 1776. The company left the space in 1999 when their lease was canceled in favor of a new flagship Toys "R" Us store. The company staged off-Broadway productions in the Gramercy Theatre from 1999 to 2002.

The company now operates three Broadway theatres – the Todd Haimes Theatre, Studio 54, and the Stephen Sondheim Theatre – and two off-Broadway spaces: the Laura Pels Theatre for new works by established playwrights, and the Roundabout Underground Black Box Theatre for new work of emerging writers and directors. The latter two theatres are located in the Harold and Miriam Steinberg Center for Theatre (the former American Place Theatre). Following the 2023 death of Todd Haimes, Roundabout's longtime artistic director, Christopher Ashley was hired as Roundabout's artistic director in September 2024. From January 2026, Rebecca Habel serves as the managing director.

== Production history ==
=== Criterion Center Stage Right ===
1991–1999:

- 1991: The Homecoming
- 1992: The Visit, Hamlet, The Price, The Fifteen Minute Hamlet and The Real Inspector Hound, The Show Off
- 1993: Anna Christie, Candida, She Loves Me, The White Liars and Black Comedy, Rodgers and Hammerstein's A Grand Night for Singing
- 1994: No Man's Land, Picnic, Hedda Gabler, Philadelphia, Here I Come!, The Glass Menagerie
- 1995: The Molerie Comedies—The School for Husbands and The Imaginary Cuckold, A Month in the Country, The Play's the Thing, Company
- 1996: The Father, The Night of the Iguana, A Thousand Clowns, Summer and Smoke, The Rehearsal
- 1997: Three Sisters, London Assurance, 1776, A View from the Bridge
- 1998: The Deep Blue Sea, Side Man
- 1999: Little Me, The Lion in Winter

=== Todd Haimes Theatre ===
Notable productions at the theater
Opening year	Name	Refs.
2000	The Man Who Came to Dinner	
2000	Betrayal	
2001	Design for Living	
2001	Major Barbara	
2001	The Women	
2002	An Almost Holy Picture	
2002	The Man Who Had All the Luck	
2002	An Evening with Mario Cantone	
2002	The Boys from Syracuse	
2003	Tartuffe	
2003	A Day in the Death of Joe Egg	
2003	As Long As We Both Shall Laugh	
2003	Big River	
2003	The Caretaker	
2004	Twentieth Century	
2004	After the Fall	
2004	Twelve Angry Men	
2005	The Constant Wife	
2005	A Naked Girl on the Appian Way	
2006	The Pajama Game	
2006	Heartbreak House	
2007	Prelude to a Kiss	
2007	Old Acquaintance	
2007	Pygmalion	
2008	The 39 Steps	
2008	Les Liaisons Dangereuses	
2008	A Man for All Seasons	
2009	Hedda Gabler	
2009	The Philanthropist	
2009	After Miss Julie	
2010	Present Laughter	
2010	Everyday Rapture	
2010	Mrs. Warren's Profession	
2011	The Importance of Being Earnest	
2011	Man and Boy	
2012	The Road to Mecca	
2012	Don't Dress for Dinner	
2012	Cyrano de Bergerac	
2013	Picnic	
2013	The Big Knife	
2013	The Winslow Boy	
2014	Machinal	
2014	Violet	
2014	The Real Thing	
2015	On the Twentieth Century	
2015	Old Times	
2016	Noises Off	
2016	Long Day's Journey into Night	
2016	The Cherry Orchard	
2017	The Price	
2017	Marvin's Room	
2017	Time and the Conways	
2018	John Lithgow: Stories by Heart	
2018	Travesties	
2018	Bernhardt/Hamlet	
2019	True West	
2019	All My Sons	
2019	The Rose Tattoo	
2020	A Soldier's Play	
2021	Trouble in Mind	
2022	Birthday Candles	
2022	1776	
2023	Fat Ham	
2023	I Need That	
2024	Doubt	
2024	Home	
2024	Yellow Face	
2025	English	
2025	Pirates! The Penzance Musical	
2026	Fallen Angels	

Source: IBDB

=== Studio 54 ===
Notable productions at the theater
Opening year	Name	Refs.
1998	Cabaret	
2004	Assassins	
2004	Pacific Overtures	
2005	A Streetcar Named Desire	
2005	A Touch of the Poet	
2006	The Threepenny Opera	
2006	The Apple Tree	
2007	110 in the Shade	
2007	The Ritz	
2008	Sunday in the Park with George	
2008	Pal Joey	
2009	Waiting for Godot	
2009	Wishful Drinking	
2010	Sondheim on Sondheim	
2010	Brief Encounter	
2011	The People in the Picture	
2012	Harvey	
2012	The Mystery of Edwin Drood	
2014	Cabaret	
2015	An Act of God	
2015	Thérèse Raquin	
2016	She Loves Me	
2016	Holiday Inn	
2017	Sweat	
2017	Latin History for Morons	
2018	Children of a Lesser God	
2018	The Lifespan of a Fact	
2019	Kiss Me, Kate	
2019	The Sound Inside	
2021	Caroline, or Change	
2022	The Minutes	
2023	Pictures from Home	
2024	Days of Wine and Roses	
2024	A Wonderful World	
2025	Call Me Izzy	
2025	Oedipus	
2026	The Rocky Horror Show	

Source: IBDB

=== Laura Pels Theatre ===
- 2004: The Foreigner, Intimate Apparel
- 2005: Mr. Marmalade, Entertaining Mr Sloane, Pig Farm, The Paris Letter
- 2006: Suddenly Last Summer, Howard Katz, The Home Place
- 2007: The Overwhelming, Crimes of the Heart
- 2008: Streamers, Distracted, Tin Pan Ally Rag
- 2009: The Understudy
- 2010: The Language Archive
- 2011: The Milk Train Doesn't Stop Here Anymore, Death Takes a Holiday
- 2012: If There Is I Haven't Found It Yet, Look Back in Anger
- 2013: Bad Jews, Talley's Folly
- 2014: Dinner with Friends, Just Jim Dale, Indian Ink
- 2015: Into the Woods, Significant Other, The Humans
- 2016: The Robber Bridegroom; Love, Love, Love
- 2017: Napoli, Brooklyn; If I Forget; The Last Match
- 2018: Amy and the Orphans; Skintight, Apologia
- 2019: Merrily We Roll Along, Toni Stone, Scotland, PA
- 2020: 72 Miles to Go...
- 2022: ...what the end will be, You Will Get Sick
- 2023: The Wanderers, Primary Trust, The Refuge Plays
- 2024: Jonah, The Counter
- 2025: Liberation, Joy, Archduke
- 2026: Chinese Republicans

=== Gramercy Theatre ===
- 1999: Ashes to Ashes, Hurrah at Last
- 2000: Hotel Suite

=== Stephen Sondheim Theatre ===
Notable productions at the theater
Opening year	Name	Refs.
2010	The Pee-wee Herman Show	
2011	Anything Goes	
2013	The Trip to Bountiful	
2014	Beautiful: The Carole King Musical	
2019	Slava's Snowshow	
2021	Mrs. Doubtfire	
2022	& Juliet	
2027	The Odd Couple	

== Awards ==
=== Drama Desk Awards ===
- 1993: Revival of a Play – Anna Christie
- 1994: Musical Revival – She Loves Me
- 1998: Revival of a Musical – Cabaret
- 1998: Revival of a Play – A View from the Bridge
- 2003: Revival of a Musical – Nine
- 2004: Revival of a Musical – Assassins
- 2005: Revival of a Play – Twelve Angry Men
- 2008: Unique Theatrical Experience – The 39 Steps
- 2011: Revival of a Musical – Anything Goes
- 2016: Revival of a Musical – She Loves Me
- 2016: Outstanding Play – The Humans

=== Laurence Olivier Awards ===
- 1995; Best Musical Revival – She Loves Me

=== Lucille Lortel Awards ===
Roundabout productions have received nine Lucille Lortel Awards. Derek McLane and Catherine Zuber won Outstanding Set and Costume Design Awards for 2004's Intimate Apparel. Reg Rogers won an Outstanding Actor award for 2002's The Dazzle. Kenneth Posner won an Outstanding Lighting Design Award for 2000's Give Me Your Answer, Do!. Robert Brill with Scott Pask, Jess Goldstein, and Kevin Adams won Awards for Outstanding Set, Costume, and Lighting Design for 1999's The Mineola Twins. 1998's All My Sons won an award for Outstanding Revival. 1996's Molly Sweeney won an award for Outstanding Play of the Season.

=== Theatre World Awards ===
Twenty-nine performers in Roundabout productions have won Theatre World Awards, which honors achievement in "breakout" performances. Winners are Christopher Goutman in 1979's The Promise, Boyd Gaines in 1981's A Month in the Country, Lisa Banes in 1981's Look Back in Anger, Anthony Heald in 1982's Misalliance, Kate Burton in 1983's Winners, Mark Capri in 1985's On Approval, Lindsay Crouse in 1992's The Homecoming, Natasha Richardson and Liam Neeson in 1993's Anna Christie, Calista Flockhart and Kevin Kilner in 1995's The Glass Menagerie, Helen Mirren in 1995's A Month in the Country, Alfred Molina in 1996's Molly Sweeney, Helen Carey in 1997's London Assurance, Alan Cumming in 1998's Cabaret, Henry Czerny in 2000's Arms and the Man, Juliette Binoche in 2001's Betrayal, David Warner in 2002's Major Barbara, Victoria Hamilton in 2003's A Day in the Death of Joe Egg, Antonio Banderas and Mary Stuart Masterson for 2003's Nine, Alexander Gemignani in 2004's Assassins, Carla Gugino in 2005's After the Fall, Mamie Gummer in 2006's Mr. Marmalade, Nellie McKay in 2006's The Threepenny Opera, Harry Connick Jr. in 2006's The Pajama Game, Ben Daniels in 2008's Les Liaisons dangereuses, and Jenna Russell in 2008's Sunday in the Park with George.

=== Tony Awards ===
- 1993: Revival – Anna Christie
- 1998: Revival of a Musical – Cabaret
- 1998: Revival of a Play – A View from the Bridge
- 1999: New Play – Side Man
- 2003: Revival of a Musical – Nine
- 2004: Revival of a Musical – Assassins
- 2005: Revival of a Play – Glengarry Glen Ross
- 2006: Revival of a Musical – The Pajama Game
- 2011: Revival of a Musical – Anything Goes
- 2016: New Play – The Humans
- 2026: New Play - Liberation

=== Obie Awards ===
They have won eight Obie Awards. 2004's Intimate Apparel, 2003's All Over, 2002's The Dazzle, 1999's The Mineola Twins, and 1981's The Chalk Garden won Performance Awards for Viola Davis, Rosemary Harris, Peter Frechette and Reg Rogers, Swoosie Kurtz, and Irene Worth respectively. Emily Mann also won a Direction Obie Award for 2003's All Over. Most recently, Amy Ryan won in 2017 for her performance in Love, Love, Love.

=== Other awards ===
Roundabout has received 41 Outer Critics Circle Awards.
