= Galesville Reservoir =

Water storage reservoir in Galesville, Oregon

- Location within Oregon Location within the United States
- Interactive map of Galesville Reservoir
- Location: Klamath Mountains; Douglas County, Oregon, U.S.
- Coordinates: 42.846°N 123.162°W
- Type: Reservoir
- Part of: Upper Cow Creek Watershed
- River sources: Cow Creek
- Catchment area: 64.7 square miles (168 km^{2})
- Basin countries: United States
- Managing agency: US Forest Service
- Built: 1986
- Surface area: 640 acres (260 ha)
- Surface elevation: 1,900 feet (580 m)
- Settlements: Azalea, Oregon

Galesville Reservoir is a water storage reservoir in the Klamath Mountains of Douglas County, Oregon, United States. The dam was completed in October 1986.

This reservoir is the outlet of the Upper Cow Creek Watershed, which contains 47,482.5 acres (19,215.5 ha) of land. The dam was proposed in a 1966 research document as a water storage dam, with a targeted completion date of 1975. The dam does not include a fish ladder, so it acts as a complete fish passage barrier.

67% of the watershed is owned by the US Forest Service and Bureau of Land Management, with 7% owned by the state and county. The remainder is privately owned. Nearly all of the land (98.7%) is used for forestry. The reservoir has a higher-than-allowed level of mercury as described by the Clean Water Act. Several historic mining claims above the reservoir exist, such as the Red Cloud Mine, which was established to extract mercury from veins of cinnabar.

Chief Miwaleta RV Park and Campground, a county park, is located on the shores of the reservoir. The upper portion of the reservoir is a wildlife area.

The name "Galesville" comes from a small town in the Cow Creek Valley. The location was a post office established in 1854 with George F. Hall as the first postmaster. It was closed in 1916. Legend has it that the initial two settlers were Gale and Goshen, who named it Galesville.

The dam was used in the 2013 film Night Moves.
