= Mamie Gummer =

American actress (born 1983)

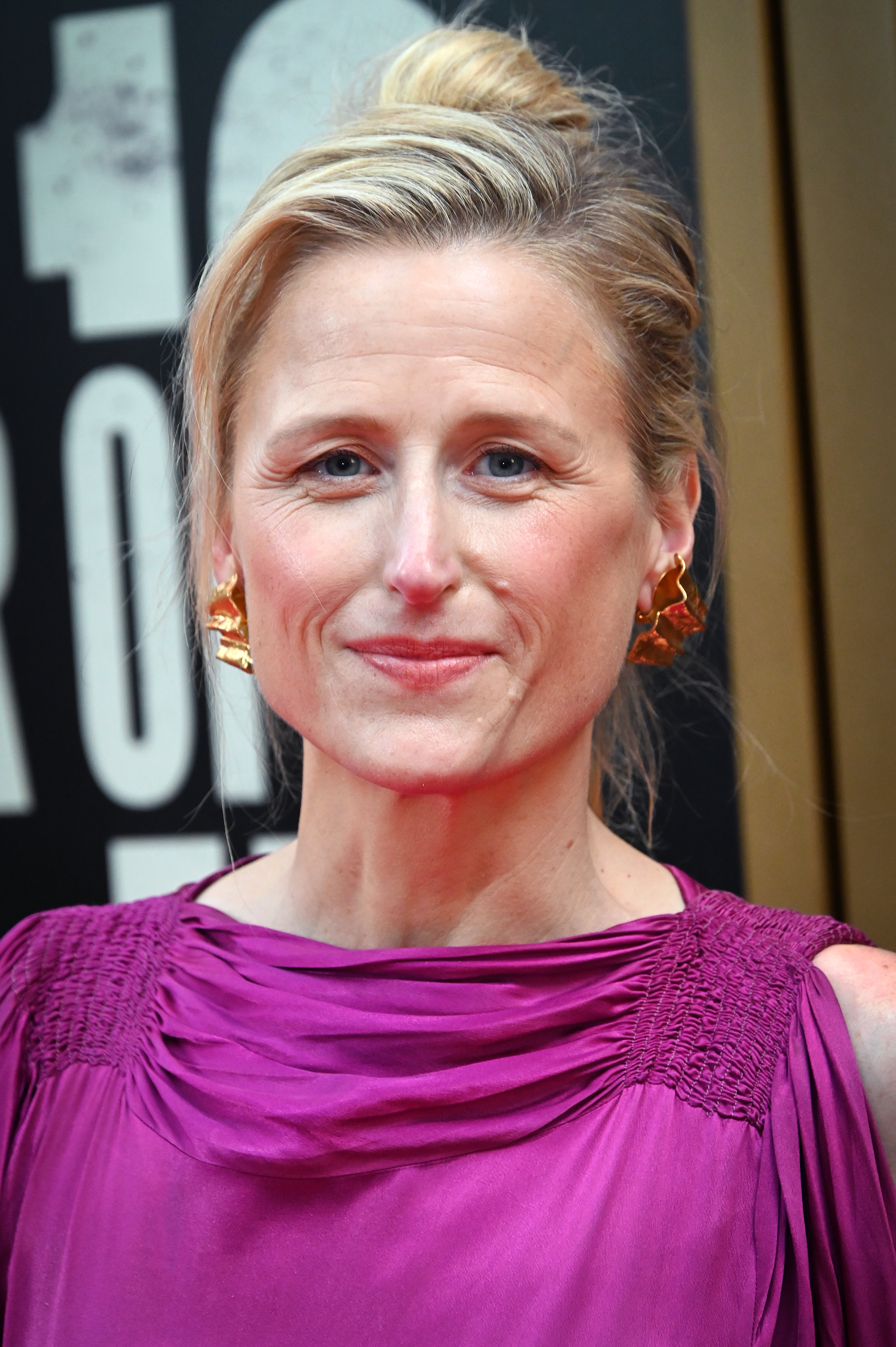
- Gummer in 2026
- Born: Mary Willa Gummer; August 3, 1983 (age 43); New York City, U.S.
- Education: Northwestern University (BA)
- Occupation: Actress
- Years active: 1986–present
- Spouses: Benjamin Walker (m. 2011; div. 2013); Mehar Sethi (m. 2019; div. 2025)
- Children: 2
- Parents: Don Gummer (father); Meryl Streep (mother)
- Relatives: Henry Wolfe Gummer (brother); Grace Gummer (sister); Louisa Jacobson (sister); Mark Ronson (brother-in-law); Mary Wilkinson Streep (grandmother)

Mary Willa "Mamie" Gummer (born August 3, 1983) is an American actress. She starred in the title role of The CW series Emily Owens, M.D. (2012–2013), and played the recurring role of Nancy Crozier on The Good Wife (2010–2015) and its spin-off, The Good Fight (2018). She has also appeared in the films Evening (2007), Side Effects (2013), Cake (2014), and Ricki and the Flash (2015). Gummer was nominated for the 2016 Drama Desk Award for Outstanding Actress in a Play for the original production of Ugly Lies the Bone. She is a daughter of Don Gummer and Meryl Streep.

== Early life and education ==
Gummer was born in New York City and is the eldest daughter of actress Meryl Streep and sculptor Don Gummer. She grew up in Salisbury, Connecticut, and also spent five years in Los Angeles with her older brother, Henry Wolfe Gummer, and younger sisters, actresses Grace Gummer and Louisa Jacobson.

Gummer attended Miss Porter's School, and graduated from the Kent School in Kent, Connecticut, before continuing her studies in theater and communications at Northwestern University, graduating in 2005.

== Career ==
As a toddler, she appeared with her mother in Heartburn (credited under the name Natalie Stern to avoid press scrutiny). Twenty months old at the time of filming, she received a positive review in The New York Times. After graduating from college in 2005, she made her off-Broadway debut alongside Michael C. Hall in the premiere of Noah Haidle's Mr. Marmalade, for which she won a Theatre World Award. In 2007, she received a Lucille Lortel Award nomination for her performance in Theresa Rebeck's The Water's Edge.

Gummer made her motion-picture debut as an adult with a minor role in Lasse Hallström's The Hoax (2006), starring Richard Gere. In 2007, she starred with her mother in Michael Cunningham's film adaptation of Susan Minot's novel Evening, playing her mother as a young woman. The film, directed by Lajos Koltai, featured Vanessa Redgrave, Glenn Close, and Claire Danes. She portrayed Sally Adams in the 2008 HBO mini series John Adams, which details the life of the second President of the United States. She made her Broadway debut in the Tony Award–nominated revival of Les liaisons dangereuses in 2008, for which she received critical praise. She also guest-starred on the CBS legal drama The Good Wife in the season 1 episode "Bad" portraying Nancy Crozier. Her character returned in season 2 episodes "Cleaning House" and "Getting Off".

In 2010, she starred in The Lightkeepers with Richard Dreyfuss, Tom Wisdom, Blythe Danner and Bruce Dern.

Starting in 2011, she starred in the ABC medical show Off the Map with Zach Gilford and Valerie Cruz.

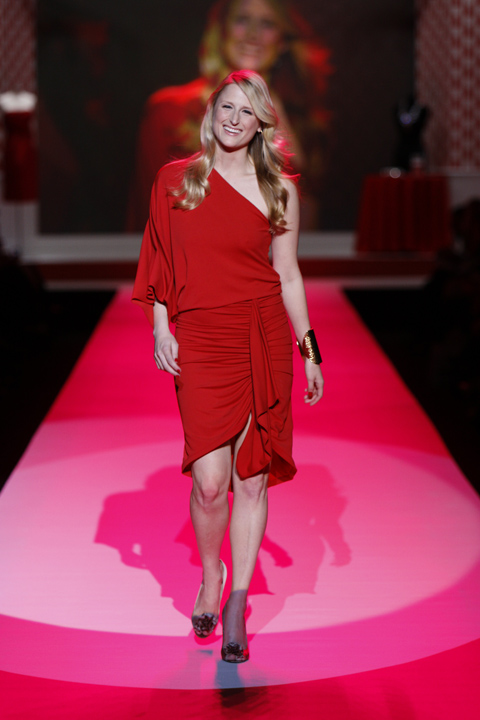
Gummer at the 2010 Heart Truth fashion show

In April 2011, she starred with Hamish Linklater and Alison Fraser in the Off-Broadway production of The School For Lies written by David Ives, directed by Walter Bobbie, and produced by Classic Stage Company.

In 2012, she starred in The CW's Emily Owens, M.D. The series was canceled early during its first season, but the network continued to air the rest of its 13-episode order.

Starting in 2015, she began a featured role in the WGN America series Manhattan.

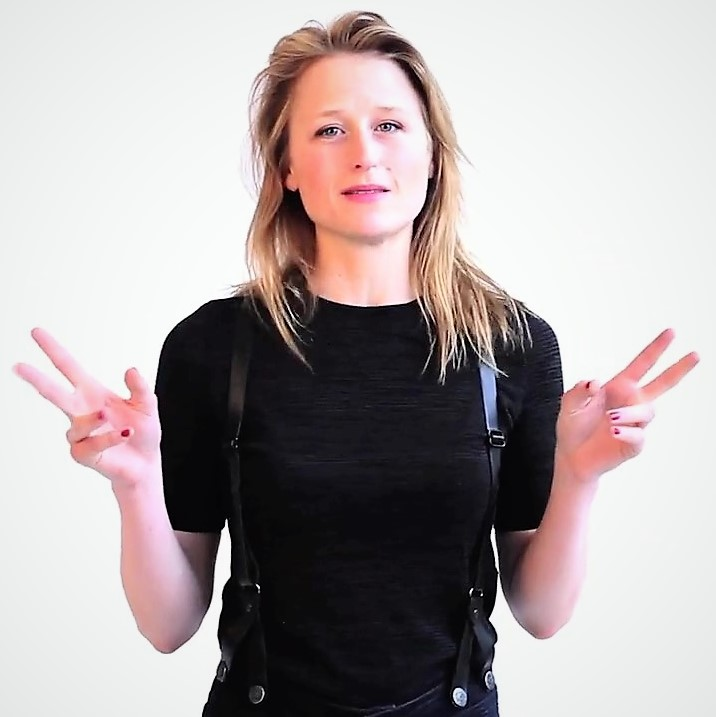
Gummer in the "Make It Fair" video, 2015

From October to December 2015, she starred in the original production of the play Ugly Lies the Bone for the Roundabout Theater Company, and received a 2016 Drama Desk Award nomination for Outstanding Actress in a Play for her performance.

On February 1, 2016, it was announced that Gummer had joined the cast of the Amazon series The Collection as a series regular in the role of Helen Sabine.

Gummer played Lucy Purcell, a mother of two children who finds herself involved in a crime, in the third season of HBO's anthology drama True Detective.

== Personal life ==
After a year and a half of dating, Gummer became engaged to actor Benjamin Walker in October 2009. They married in July 2011 at her parents' home in Connecticut, and resided in Park Slope, Brooklyn, New York City. In March 2013, it was announced that Gummer and Walker had amicably separated.

She became engaged to writer Mehar Sethi (born Meharban Singh Sethi) in August 2018 and was revealed to be pregnant with her first child in December 2018. They were married in February 2019. The same month, Gummer gave birth to a son. A daughter was born in 2021. On February 6, 2025, Gummer and her second husband Sethi filed for divorce after they were separated in 2023.

Gummer has been involved with charities such as Women's Refugee Commission and the Nomi Network.

== Filmography ==
=== Film ===
Year	Title	Role	Notes
1986	Heartburn	Annie Forman	Credited as Natalie Stern
2003	Reservations	Hostess	Short film
2006	The Hoax	Dana	
2006	The Devil Wears Prada	Starbucks employee	Deleted scene
2007	Evening	Lila Wittenborn	
2007	All Saints Day	Lily	Short film
2008	Stop-Loss	Jeanie	
2008	The Loss of a Teardrop Diamond	Julie Corleone	
2009	Taking Woodstock	Tisha	
2009	The Lightkeepers	Ruth	
2010	Coach	Stella	
2010	Twelve Thirty	Maura	
2010	The Ward	Emily	
2013	The Lifeguard	Mel	
2013	Side Effects	Kayla Millbank	
2014	Cake	Bonnie	
2014	Echo Park	Sophie	
2015	The End of the Tour	Julie	
2015	Ricki and the Flash	Julie Brummel	
2018	An Actor Prepares	Annabelle	
2018	Out of Blue	Jennifer Rockwell	
2021	Separation	Maggie Vahn	

=== Television ===
Year	Title	Role	Notes
2008	John Adams	Sally Smith Adams	3 episodes
2010–2015	The Good Wife	Nancy Crozier	8 episodes
2011	Off the Map	Dr. Mina Minard	13 episodes
2011	A Gifted Man	Gemma	Episode: "In Case of Exposure"
2012	The Big C	Maxine Cooper	3 episodes
2012–2013	Emily Owens, M.D.	Emily Owens	13 episodes
2014	Elementary	Margaret Bray	Episode: "Terra Pericolosa"
2015	Manhattan	Nora	6 episodes
2016	The Collection	Helen Sabine	8 episodes
2018–2021	The Good Fight	Nancy Crozier	2 episodes
2018	Robot Chicken	Carly (voice)	Episode: "No Wait, He Has a Cane"
2018	Castle Rock	Matthew Deaver's Mother	Episode: "Henry Deaver"
2019	True Detective	Lucy Purcell	4 episodes
2020–2025	Blood of Zeus	Electra (voice)	9 episodes
2020	The Right Stuff	Jerrie Cobb	
2022	DMZ	Rose	Miniseries
2025	We Were Liars	Carrie Sinclair	

== Theater ==
Year	Title	Role	Notes
2003	The Laramie Project		Northwestern University Theater
2004	12 Volt Heart		Northwestern University Theater
2004	The House of Blue Leaves	Bananas Shaughnessy	Northwestern University Theater
2005–2006	Mr. Marmalade	Lucy	Laura Pels Theatre, NYC
2006	The Water's Edge	Erica	Second Stage Theatre, NYC
2007	The Autumn Garden	Sophie Tuckerman	Williamstown Theatre Festival
2007	Desdemona: A Play about a Handkerchief		Playwrights Horizons Mainstage Theatre
2008	Les Liaisons Dangereuses	Cécile Volanges	American Airlines Theatre
2008	Hunting and Gathering	Bess	Primary Stages, NYC
2009	Uncle Vanya	Sonya Serebryakova	Classic Stage Company, NYC
2011	The School for Lies	Celimene	Classic Stage Company, NYC
2015	Ugly Lies the Bone	Jess	Roundabout Theatre, NYC
2017	The Siegel	Alice	South Coast Repertory, LA
2018	Our Very Own Carlin McCullough	Cyn	Geffen Playhouse Theater, LA

== Awards and nominations ==
Year	Work	Association	Award	Result
2006	Mr. Marmalade	Theatre World Award	Best Supporting Actress	Won
2007	The Water's Edge	Lucille Lortel Award	Outstanding Featured Actress	Nominated
2009	Uncle Vanya	Lucille Lortel Award	Outstanding Featured Actress	Nominated
2016	Ugly Lies the Bone	Drama Desk Award	Outstanding Actress in a Play	Nominated
