= Mary Wilkinson Streep =

American fine-artist (1915–2001)

- Streep with her children Harry Wiliam III and Mary Louise, c. 1952
- Born: Mary Wolf Wilkinson; July 30, 1915; Brooklyn, New York, U.S.
- Died: September 29, 2001 (aged 86); New York, New York, U.S.
- Spouse: Harry Wilbur Streep Jr.
- Children: 3, including Meryl Streep
- Relatives: Henry Wolfe (grandson); Mamie Gummer (granddaughter); Grace Gummer (granddaughter); Louisa Jacobson (granddaughter)

Mary Wolf Streep (née Wilkinson; July 30, 1915 – September 29, 2001) was an American fine artist and art editor. She was the mother of actress Meryl Streep.

== Life and career ==
Mary Wolf Wilkinson was born in Brooklyn, New York, as the second daughter and fourth of six children of Mary Agnes (née Wolf) and Harry Rockefellow Wilkinson.

She grew up in Madison, New Jersey, graduating from Madison High School, she then studied fine art at the Art Students League in New York.

Streep trained as a fine artist and became the art-editor for Home Furnishings Magazine and also did commercial artwork on a freelance basis. Mary had an art studio in the back of her home. She married pharmaceutical company executive Harry Wilbur Streep Jr. and had a daughter, Meryl, and two sons, Dana Streep and Harry Wilbur Streep III (husband of actress Maeve Kinkead). She is also the grandmother of Streep's children, musician Henry Wolfe, actresses Mamie Gummer and Grace Gummer, and model Louisa Gummer. Her son-in-law, Don Gummer, is also an artist, a sculptor.

Meryl Streep has often stated in interviews that her mother has been the inspiration for some of her characters she has played on the screen. Mary enrolled her daughter in voice lessons at the age of twelve after noticing her daughter's need to perform.

== Death ==
Streep died at Cornell Medical Center from complications of heart disease after a short illness.
