= Off the Map (TV series) =

- Genre: Medical drama
- Created by: Jenna Bans
- Starring: Martin Henderson; Valerie Cruz; Caroline Dhavernas; Jason Winston George; Zach Gilford; Mamie Gummer; Rachelle Lefevre; Jonathan Castellanos
- Theme music composer: Ben Decter
- Country of origin: United States
- Original language: English
- No. of seasons: 1
- No. of episodes: 13

Production
- Executive producers: Shonda Rhimes; Jenna Bans; Betsy Beers; Gretchen J. Berg; Aaron Harberts; Randall Zisk
- Producers: Mark Fish; Sara Fischer
- Running time: 60 minutes
- Production companies: Minnesota Logging Company; Shondaland; ABC Studios

Original release
- Network: ABC
- Release: January 12 – April 6, 2011

Off the Map is an American medical drama television series created by Jenna Bans, who also served as an executive producer together with Shonda Rhimes and Betsy Beers. The series ran on ABC from January 12, 2011 to April 6, 2011. The series was filmed in Puerto Rico and on Oahu, Hawaii, using many of the production facilities remaining from the ABC series Lost (2004–10).

On May 13, 2011, ABC cancelled the series after one season.

== Premise ==
Set in a remote South American village, young doctors try to save lives in their understaffed, jungle medical clinic.

== Cast and characters ==
=== Main ===
- Martin Henderson as Dr. Benjamin "Ben" Keeton: Keeton is "one of the world's greatest humanitarians", according to Mina and Lily. He was married to Abby and they had a daughter together, but they died during an accident. However, in episode 4 it is revealed that Abby is on life support in the San Miguel Hospital and Ben is keeping her on life support because her trust fund bankrolls the clinic. When EEG scans show no change, Ben must make the decision whether to keep his wife on life support. He became involved with Dr. Ryan Clark some time after the accident, and they have mostly been on and off. When asked by Brenner how long they've been dating, his words were, "About a year. On and off. We fight, then we make up". Ben starts to realize he must move on with his life and allows himself to commit to Ryan on a deeper level. When she has to go to New York for a full investigation regarding her heart disease, he decides to temporarily leave the clinic behind and leave with her. In episode 12 Hold on tight he fires Mina for lying to him about being Clark's doctor.
- Jason Winston George as Dr. Otis Cole: It is said about Cole that his bark is "just as bad as his bite". Although he is strict while working, off the job he can be extremely silly. He is good friends with Zee, and although they started out as friends with benefits, he realizes he is falling in love with her after she breaks up with him. Cole was once addicted to morphine and heroin and consumes candy to stay clean. When Cole and Minard must retrieve heroin to use as painkillers, he contemplates relapsing, carrying around a stash of heroin for a whole day, before coming clean to Ben, who then takes his heroin and gives him some more candy.
- Valerie Cruz as Zitajalehrena "Zee" Toledo Alvarez: Zee is the mother hen of the doctors. She shows disapproval towards workplace romances but has developed a casual relationship with Cole. When she finds out it is more a friends with benefits thing for Cole, she ends things between them, but finds herself drawn back in when he is injured during a rescue mission. They are currently contemplating getting back together and try a real relationship.
- Caroline Dhavernas as Dr. Lily Brenner: Brenner's fiancé was killed in a cycling accident after she asked him to go out and get her some cereal. She has an attraction to Ben Keeton, although this was set back by her disapproval at his handling of a patient in "A Doctor Time Out", and is completely ended once she discovers Keeton has gotten back together with Clark. She meets a local farmer named Mateo at the local bar and forms a relationship with him, until she discovers that he and his family grow coca on their land, which is used to make cocaine. Brenner is an extreme control freak and finds it difficult at first to adapt to the unexpected situations in the jungle that regularly break her routine.
- Zach Gilford as Dr. Tommy Fuller: Tommy is shown to be a promiscuous and light-hearted character who incurred Cole's wrath quite early on, earning the nickname "Plastics". He is shown to have "barely made his way through medical school" according to Cole. Tommy had a brief crush on Ryan, until he found out she was dating Keeton. He had a relationship with a local girl named Alma, but due to lack of knowledge of each other's language, he finds it difficult to be around her. He eventually gets drunk and sleeps with Minard, after which things become awkward for them. In the episode 11 "Everything As It Should Be" Tommy gets jealous when a patient, Pher becomes involved with Mina. He tells Brenner this and she says go for it, when he does he finds Mina in the shower with Pher. Tommy is shown to be upset when he sees Mina and Pher together. He is upset when he realizes that Mina's relationship is more than sex and eggs. In the season finale he finally tells Mina that he has fallen in love with her.
- Mamie Gummer as Dr. Mina Minard: Mina is a doctor who "only works solo" and loses confidence easily due to a misdiagnosis earlier in her career that led to the death of a patient, a little boy named Eric. She is highly competitive at work. She owns a chicken named Dinner that was given to her by a grateful patient. In episode 4 Mina says that her father is the head of a major Boston hospital, and when she misdiagnosed Eric he wiped her resume clean of the incident. She appears to have some kind of attraction to Cole after they share some close moments. In episode 8, Mina sleeps with Tommy while she is drunk after a party for her new god-daughter. In episode 12 Hold on tight Mina becomes Ryan's doctor without Keeton knowing. At the end of the episode Keeton fires Mina for lying to him and will never let her be Ryan's doctor.
- Rachelle Lefevre as Dr. Ryan Clark: Ryan's parents were missionaries, and she grew up all over the world. She was bitten by an assassin bug when she was eight years old which went untreated causing her to develop Chagas disease. Twenty years later, the disease has caused irreversible heart damage and leads her to going into heart failure. She is in an on and off again relationship with Ben Keeton, although he eventually fully commits to her once he realizes it is time for him to move on from his past. When he discovers the truth about Ryan's condition, he is worried sick, which leads to both of them declaring their love for each other. When Ryan has to go to New York for her heart to get her on a transplant list, she is joined by Ben at the airport, who decides to come with her.
- Jonathan Castellanos as Charlie: When Charlie was 9, his parents abandoned him. He now works at the clinic, and "supposedly" lives in a hostel. It is shown that he actually house-sits condos for 6 months a year, and has a bed under a lab in the clinic as well. He is good friends with both Tommy and Cole. Charlie has a crush on Brenner and was worried that she did not know his name. Charlie has given voice to the titles of episode 3 and 4.

=== Recurring ===
- Nicholas Gonzalez as Mateo
- Aimee Garcia as Alma
- Elizabeth Peña as Inez

== Episodes ==
| No. | Title | Directed by | Written by | Original release date | Viewers (millions) |
|---|---|---|---|---|---|
| 1 | "Saved by the Great White Hope" | Randy Zisk | Jenna Bans | January 12, 2011 | 7.57 |
Lily Brenner, Tommy Fuller and Mina Minard are all running away from their lives when they find themselves practicing medicine in paradise. Paradise simply happens to be the most challenging place to practice medicine in the world. Ben Keeton, the youngest ever Chief of Surgery at UCLA and founder of the clinic, acts as their guide and mentor in a world of dangers alongside his trusted colleagues; Otis Cole, Zitajalehrena Toledo Alvarez or "Zee" for short and the mysterious Ryan Clark. They also meet Charlie, a 14-year-old boy who works at the clinic as a translator and other things who has an instant connection with Tommy. Lily challenges herself to save a man from death on a zip line. Tommy's willingness to concede finds him at odds with Cole and almost costs him his place at the clinic. Mina almost loses a patient because she fails to recognise the simplest diagnosis. It is a rough beginning but they've made it through.
| 2 | "Smile. Don't Kill Anyone." | Mark Tinker | Gretchen J. Berg & Aaron Harberts | January 19, 2011 | 5.79 |
A duo of wildlife photographers find themselves in trouble when one of them is caught by a green anaconda. Tommy finds himself learning a cultural lesson from the local populace while finally managing to forge a small connection with Otis. Mina finds herself challenged when she is forced to work with Ryan, she begins to question her abilities as a doctor. Lily learns that she needs to let go of her procedural way of thinking now that she's left the ER. Ben has to face some very real feelings when faced with them by Ryan. Otis and Zee heat up despite her initial reluctance.
| 3 | "A Doctor Time Out" | Rob Corn | Luke Schelhaas | January 26, 2011 | 5.06 |
While Ben, Zee and Lily try to deliver a baby from the woman they rescued from the forest, Tommy and Ryan are fighting for the life of the father and her husband in the jungle. Meanwhile Mina and Cole treat a patient who has been electrocuted after stepping in a puddle, which resulted in a power outage all over the village, complicating the caesarean surgery Ben and Brenner are trying to perform to deliver the baby. Lily discovers that Ben's wife and child died a few years ago, and that her current patients have stirred up old wounds for him. The man Tommy and Ryan were treating dies, but Tommy and Ryan keep his heart beating so his wife and child can get much needed blood transfusions from him.
| 4 | "On the Mean Streets of San Miguel" | Eric Stoltz | Christine Boylan | February 2, 2011 | 5.37 |
Ryan's complicated relationship with Ben has her taking out her frustrations with a machete in the jungle. Lily, Ben and Charlie go to San Miguel to get medications needed to treat a patient with a serious staph infection. Lily discovers that Ben's wife is still alive in a hospital in San Miguel. Back in the village, she meets a guy named Mateo who pays her tab at a bar. He has just returned to the village after attending University. Tommy treats a man with a "private" problem, and in the process falls for the man's beautiful girlfriend Alma. Cole is horrified to find out that Zee signed him up to have his impacted tooth removed. The doctors are surprised to learn that one of the kindest patients they are treating is a former Nazi who hid away for 60 years. Zee uses Ryan's machete when she learns that Otis thinks of them only as "friends with benefits". Cole breaks down at the last minute and has the traveling dentist remove his painful tooth but refuses any drugs, even after warned it will be a painful oral surgery. Mina holds Cole's hand as he "white knuckle's it" through the procedure.
| 5 | "I'm Here" | Randy Zisk | Mark Fish | February 9, 2011 | 5.61 |
After getting clobbered in a beach soccer game by some local kids, the jungle docs have to hit the high seas on a rescue mission. A man and his 17-year-old daughter were caught in an underwater rockslide. The father makes it up but his daughter is trapped underwater. Ben and Ryan get into scuba gear and dive down to treat their patient. Lily gets a surprise visit from Mateo, the handsome man who bought her drinks in San Miguel and learns more about him. An ex-flame of Zee's returns to the clinic not only for treatment, but for her heart as well, and she begins to question her relationship with Cole. Ryan has had shortness of breath all day. Tommy gets closer with Alma, who just broke up with her boyfriend. He puts a letter in the mailbox to finally let his parents know that he's fine and somewhere in South America. After having a few moments, Mina decides to open up to Cole.
| 6 | "It's Good" | Donna Deitch | Joe Sachs | February 16, 2011 | 4.33 |
The clinic is left without any medication after a robbery, and the doctors are finding it hard to treat the patients. Ben, Zee and Lily try to treat a patient with a ruptured appendix, but the robbery left them without enough anesthetics to perform the surgery. Cole must face his old demons as he and Mina go to see his old dealer on getting some drugs to use as pain relief, much to the dismay of the other doctors. As Ben preps for surgery, Cole and Mina paddle down the river to the secret drug lab. A little girl with a complicated bug bite brings up old memories for Ryan as she tries to treat her. Tommy meets a few vacationing college kids who are members of his old frat and treats one of them whose hangover turns out to be a serious brain disease.
| 7 | "Es Un Milagro" | Randy Zisk | Jeannine Renshaw | February 23, 2011 | 4.84 |
A rescue chopper has crashed somewhere deep in the jungle. The clinic team heads out to help, but Lily is nowhere to be found. In the aftermath of the helicopter crash, Ryan looks for the missing girl with the bug bite, the patient with the ruptured appendix's wife suffers some injuries and Mina races to save her life when they become complicated and Ben, Tommy and Cole try to treat the pilot who is seriously wounded. Cole's old past continues to haunt him and start to hinder his work at the clinic, and he contemplates ruining his sobriety. Tommy's a little tired of Charlie hanging around him 24/7. Lily discovers a secret about Mateo and his family.
| 8 | "It's a Leaf" | Ed Ornelas | Gabriel Llanas | March 2, 2011 | 4.96 |
Lily and Otis are off to help three brothers who get trapped in a mine after digging for gold. During the rescue, Otis is seriously injured. Zee has Mina oversee an ancient birth ritual, and during the ritual, she unwittingly becomes the child's godmother. Then at the party she and Tommy have a drunken night together. After the accident Otis confesses his true feelings for Zee while she checks up on him.
| 9 | "There's Nothing to Fix" | Michael Katleman | Mark Fish | March 9, 2011 | 4.31 |
After a water taxi accident, Ben, Tommy and Lily go to treat the survivors. After finding out that one passenger is still missing, Lily goes to find him, which leads her to make a gutwrenching decision. Meanwhile Tommy and Ben tend to a seriously injured passenger and disagree over diagnosis. Cole and Zee try to help newly adoptive parents with a very sick baby. Ryan and Mina must treat a very rude and obnoxious patient. Things between Tommy and Mina get awkward after their drunken one night stand.
| 10 | "I'm Home" | Randy Zisk | Joe Sachs & Luke Schelhaas | March 16, 2011 | 4.21 |
Ryan and Ben come back from New York and leaves with Mina, Tommy and Otis to treat a breakout of Hepatitis in the local prison while Zee and Lily stay back at the clinic. Otis tries to help a prisoner who is also an old friend and finds out that the Hepatitis outbreak has spread over to the women's prison. Meanwhile, Lily treats a woman whom she finds out is Mateo's mother. Ben worries if Ryan is returning to work too soon. Tommy tries to fix things between him and Mina after the awkwardness between them continues.
| 11 | "Everything's as It Should Be" | Karen Gaviola | Christine Boylan & Jeannine Renshaw | March 23, 2011 | 4.46 |
An old friend of Ben's visits the clinic and brings two patients to do a transplant. But Lily finds out that there is something suspicious about the patients and the procedure might put the clinic in jeopardy. Zee and Otis treat a patient whose daughter is his caretaker and wonder if she is abusing him. Also Zee wonders if she should give Otis another chance. Tommy becomes jealous after a patient expresses interest in Mina and realizes he has feelings for her. Mateo's mother plays matchmaker and tries to get Lily and Mateo back together.
| 12 | "Hold on Tight" | Jeff Bleckner | Gretchen J. Berg & Aaron Harberts | March 30, 2011 | 4.23 |
Ryan's health worsens and she asks Mina to treat her while most of the team is out helping two injured parachutists. She then appoints Mina as her primary care physician, much to the dismay of Ben. Tommy meets Charlie's mother and tries to diagnoses exactly what is wrong with her after she shows strange symptoms and characteristics. Lily tries to get to know Mateo's family but is still uncomfortable with the coca. Tommy becomes jealous of Mina's new relationship.
| 13 | "There's A Lot to Miss About the Jungle" | Randy Zisk | Jenna Bans | April 6, 2011 | 3.80 |
The country's Holy Week festivities take a chaotic turn when a truck float crashes, and Ben makes a difficult call as Ryan's health deteriorates. Meanwhile, Lily forces her own issues aside when tragedy strikes Mateo's family farm.

== Release ==
=== International broadcasts ===
In Canada, Off the Map was aired on Global HD. Although never screened on British television, it became available on-demand through the ABC Studios channel on Sky in 2015.

=== Home releases ===
On June 3, 2011, it was announced that ABC Studios would release the complete series on DVD in Region 1. The set, including all 13 episodes, as well as bonus features, was made available on August 23, 2011.

| Region | Title | Language(s) | Subtitles | Bonus Features | Disc Count | Release date |
|---|---|---|---|---|---|---|
| 1 | The Complete Series | English | French, Spanish | Deleted Scenes, Gag Reel, "Jungle Medicine" Featurette, "On The Set at 'Off The Map'" Featurette | 3 | August 20, 2011 |

== Reception ==
=== Critical reception ===
On the review aggregator website Rotten Tomatoes, 18% of 22 critics' reviews are positive, with an average rating of 5.90/10. The website's consensus reads, "Off the Map is dreadfully painful in its efforts to be dramatic and earnest." Metacritic, which uses a weighted average, assigned the television series a score of 49 out of 100, based on 21 critics, indicating "mixed or average reviews".

=== Ratings ===
Off the Map premiered with 7.57 million viewers. It became ABC's highest viewed telecast in the timeslot since the premiere of Eastwick on September 23, 2009, and its second episode on September 30, 2009.

| Season | Timeslot (EDT) | Season Premiere | Season Finale | TV Season | Rank (viewers) | Viewers (in millions) |
|---|---|---|---|---|---|---|
| 1 | Wednesday 10:00 P.M. | January 12, 2011 | April 6, 2011 | 2011 | #78 | 6.41 |

=== Accolades ===
The series received a nomination for Best Primetime Television Program, with Jonathan Castellanos being nominated as well for Best Supporting Actor - Television, at the 2011 Imagen Foundation Awards.
