= Stand Clear of the Closing Doors =

2013 American film

- Film poster
- Directed by: Sam Fleischner
- Written by: Rose Lichter-Marck
- Screenplay by: Micah Bloomberg; Rose Lichter-Marck
- Starring: Jesus Sanchez-Velez; Andrea Suarez Paz; Azul Zorrilla
- Cinematography: Adam Jandrup; Ethan Palmer
- Edited by: Talia Barrett
- Music by: Sarah Lipstate
- Distributed by: Oscilloscope Pictures
- Release date: October 10, 2013 (UK)
- Running time: 102 minutes
- Country: United States
- Languages: English; Spanish

Stand Clear of the Closing Doors is a 2013 American drama film directed by Sam Fleischner. The story is about an autistic young person named Ricky who, after a particularly difficult day at school, escapes into the New York City Subway. It shows the city through a documentary-like lens as the autistic teen looses himself in the sprawling subway system. It was shown in the main competition section of the 2013 Deauville American Film Festival, where it won Prix du Jury (Jury Special Prize) of the festival.

In the movie, Ricky the main character played by Jesus Sanchez-Velez, an actor with Asperger's syndrome who powerfully conveys Rickey's frustrations at being unable to communicate with the outside world. This provides a level of autism representation unusual for the period.

== Reception ==
On the review aggregator website Rotten Tomatoes, 88% of 34 critics' reviews are positive, with an average rating of 7.9/10. The website's consensus reads: "Unassuming yet irrevocably absorbing, Stand Clear of the Closing Doors uses a refreshing perspective to explore universal themes." Metacritic, which uses a weighted average, assigned the film a score of 86 out of 100, based on 10 critics, indicating "universal acclaim".

Stand Clear of the Closing Doors was shown at London's BFI cinema relaxed screening evening, 21 August 2021 in collaboration with Citizen Autistic.
