= Louisa Jacobson =

American actress and model (born 1991)

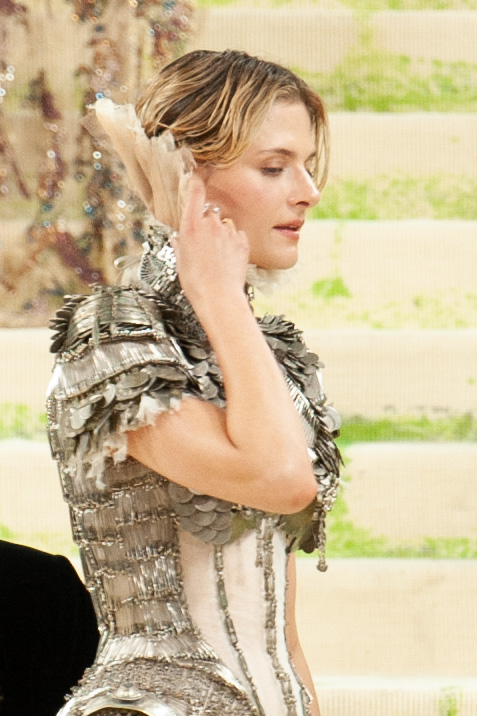
- Jacobson at the 2026 Met Gala
- Born: Louisa Jacobson Gummer; June 12, 1991 (age 35); Los Angeles, California, U.S.
- Education: Vassar College (AB); Yale University (MFA)
- Occupation: Actress
- Years active: 2017–present
- Parents: Don Gummer (father); Meryl Streep (mother)
- Relatives: Henry Wolfe Gummer (brother); Mamie Gummer (sister); Grace Gummer (sister); Mark Ronson (brother-in-law); Mary Wilkinson Streep (grandmother)

Louisa Jacobson Gummer (born June 12, 1991) is an American actress. The youngest child of actress Meryl Streep, she graduated from the Yale School of Drama with an MFA in acting. She is known for starring in the HBO period drama series The Gilded Age (2022–present).

== Early life ==
Louisa Jacobson Gummer was born on June 12, 1991, in Los Angeles, California, to actress Meryl Streep and sculptor Don Gummer. She is the younger sister of musician Henry Gummer and actresses Mamie Gummer and Grace Gummer. She attended Poly Prep Country Day School and graduated from Vassar College in 2013 majoring in psychology. She also attended British American Drama Academy three-week summer programme in Oxford and is a graduate of the Yale School of Drama with a master of fine arts in acting.

== Career ==
Jacobson uses her middle name as her surname professionally, as there already is an actress named Louisa Gummer, and the Screen Actors Guild (SAG) requires that 'no member use a professional name which is the same as, or resembles so closely as to tend to be confused with the name of any other member'.

On stage, Jacobson made her professional acting debut as Mary Dalton in Yale Repertory Theatre's production of Nambi E. Kelley's Native Son, directed by Seret Scott in 2017. The following year she starred in Williamstown Theatre Festival's production of Carson McCullers' play Member of the Wedding (2018), opposite Tavi Gevinson and directed by Gaye Taylor Upchurch. In 2019, she starred as Juliet in The Old Globe's production of Romeo and Juliet. The Times of San Diego praised her performance writing, "Jacobson has the pulsating impetuosity of a teenager...Her profligate joy in love and unchecked anguish in bereavement are palpable, visceral".

In 2022, Jacobson acted in the Lindsay Joelle play Trayf at the Geffen Playhouse. Though only in one scene, critics praised her for stealing the show. Maureen Lee Lenker of Entertainment Weekly wrote, "Jacobson makes a meal of her featured role" and that "She's heartbreaking in her single scene, confronting Shmuel about the constraints of their religion." Also in 2022, she made her television debut starring in Julian Fellowes' HBO period drama series The Gilded Age acting opposite Carrie Coon, Christine Baranski, Cynthia Nixon and Denée Benton. In 2023, she was nominated alongside the cast for the Screen Actors Guild Award for Outstanding Performance by an Ensemble in a Drama Series.

In 2024, Jacobson served as the assistant director to Michael Breslin for the Off-Broadway play Invasive Species. That same year she was cast in a supporting role in Celine Song's A24 romantic comedy Materialists which was filmed in New York City.

== Personal life ==
In 2024, Jacobson openly identified as queer. She made her relationship public amid Pride Month with her former partner Anna Blundell.

== Filmography ==
=== Film ===
| Year | Title | Role | Notes |
|---|---|---|---|
| 2025 | Materialists | Charlotte | Feature film |

=== Television ===
| Year | Title | Role | Notes |
|---|---|---|---|
| 2019 | Gone Hollywood | Trish Sparks | Unaired TV pilot |
| 2022–present | The Gilded Age | Marian Brook | 25 episodes |

== Theatre ==
| Year | Title | Role | Playwright | Theatre |
|---|---|---|---|---|
| 2017 | Native Son | Mary Dalton | Richard Wright | Yale Repertory Theatre |
| 2018 | The Member of the Wedding | Janice | Carson McCullers | Williamstown Theatre Festival |
| 2019 | Romeo and Juliet | Juliet Capulet | William Shakespeare | Old Globe Theatre, San Diego |
| 2022 | Trayf | Leah | Lindsay Joelle | Geffen Playhouse, Los Angeles |
| 2023 | Lunch Bunch | Tuttle | Adrian Einspanier | 122CC Second Floor Theatre, New York |
| 2025 | Trophy Boys | Jared | Emmanuelle Mattana | MCC Theater, New York |

== Awards and nominations ==
| Year | Association | Category | Project | Result | Ref. |
|---|---|---|---|---|---|
| 2023 | Screen Actors Guild Awards | Outstanding Ensemble in a Drama Series | The Gilded Age | Nominated | |
