= The Collection (TV series) =

- Genre: Period drama
- Created by: Oliver Goldstick
- Directed by: Dearbhla Walsh; Dan Zeff
- Starring: Richard Coyle; Tom Riley; Mamie Gummer; Frances de la Tour
- Composer: Dominik Scherrer
- Countries of origin: United Kingdom; France
- Original language: English

Production
- Executive producers: Anne Thomopoulos; Kate Croft; Pascal Breton; Simon Vaughan; Médéric Albouy for France Télévisions; Tomas de Matteis for MFP
- Producer: Selwyn Roberts
- Running time: 52-60 minutes
- Production companies: Lookout Point; Artis Pictures Production; Federation Entertainment; Amazon Studios; France Télévisions; MFP

Original release
- Network: Amazon Prime Video
- Release: September 2 – October 21, 2016

The Collection is a television period drama miniseries, focusing on the Paris fashion scene after World War II. It is a co-production Amazon Studios, BBC Worldwide's Lookout Point, Federation Entertainment and France Télévisions, It premiered on 2 September 2016.

== Plot ==
The series focuses on brothers Paul and Claude Sabine at their family's Paris fashion house. Around them, the city is emerging from the Occupation of World War II. The charming and outgoing Paul has the business savvy of the two brothers. Claude is the artistic talent, but also introverted, misanthropic and homosexual.

Paul seeks to stake a claim in the top tiers of the Paris fashion scene as the city poises itself to reclaim the title of fashion capital of the world. He encounters obstacles in the forms of his past, his conniving mother's actions and the competitive environment of the industry.

Paul's American wife, Helen, comes from a wealthy family whose money helped the Sabine fashion house survive during austere times. Throughout the first season, she and Paul face marital problems due to his many secrets.

Claude, meanwhile, grapples with the emotional trauma of a vicious attack and robbery by a lover who then suddenly disappeared. He also longs for more recognition of his artistic contributions to the Sabine house, but his efforts are often thwarted by his dominating family and his own anti-social behavior.

The series also follows Billy Novak, a young American photographer who is hired by the Sabine family. He is inspired by and falls in love with a seamstress-turned-model named Nina. She, however, is more concerned with finding the illegitimate son she was recently forced to give up for adoption.

The series includes the lives and relationships of other employees in the fashion house. It also addresses the atmosphere of uneasiness and paranoia that arose in the Cold War era, as well as the hunt for former Nazi collaborators.

== Cast ==
- Richard Coyle as Paul Sabine
- Tom Riley as Claude Sabine
- Mamie Gummer as Helen Sabine
- Frances de la Tour as Yvette
- Jenna Thiam as Nina
- Max Deacon as Billy Novak
- Alix Poisson as Charlotte
- Alexandre Brasseur as Victor
- Irène Jacob as Marianne
- Poppy Corby-Tuech as Dominique
- Bethan Mary James as Juliette
- Sarah Parish as Marjorie Stutter
- James Cosmo as Jules Trouvier
- Michael Kitchen as Lemaire
- Allan Corduner as Bompard
- Stanley Townsend as Stanley Rossi
- Michelle Gomez as Eliette
- Jacob Fortune-Lloyd as Cesar

== Production ==
The eight-part series was filmed in Wales, France and Pinewood Studios in the first half of 2016 and marked the first time a continental-European public national broadcaster has collaborated with a major subscription video on demand platform, a global distributor and a British production company, on an English-language drama.

The creator, Oliver Goldstick, was previously an executive producer of the fashion drama series Ugly Betty.

== Episodes ==
No.	Title	Directed by	Written by	Original release date
1	"The Deal"	Dearbhla Walsh	Oliver Goldstick	TBA
2	"The Dress"	Dearbhla Walsh	TBA	TBA
3	"The Scent"	Dearbhla Walsh	Maya Goldsmith	TBA
4	"The Launch"	Dearbhla Walsh	TBA	TBA
5	"The Afterglow"	Dan Zeff	TBA	TBA
6	"The Weekend"	Dan Zeff	TBA	TBA
7	"The Betrayal"	Dan Zeff	TBA	TBA
8	"The Offer"	Dan Zeff	TBA	TBA

== Broadcast ==
In Australia, the series premiered on BBC First on 14 March 2017. In South Korea, KBS 1TV started to air it on 30 June 2017. In Russia, the series premiered on Channel One Russia on 17 July 2017. In the United States, it began airing under the PBS Masterpiece umbrella on 8 October 2017.
