= Saved by the Great White Hope =

- Off the Map episode
- Episode no.: Season 1 Episode 1
- Directed by: Daniel Minahan
- Story by: Jenna Bans
- Original air date: January 12, 2011

Guest appearance
- Michael McKean as Ed

Episode chronology
← Previous —	Next → "Smile. Don't Kill Anyone."

"Saved by the Great White Hope" is the first episode of the ABC series Off the Map. The episode was originally broadcast on January 12, 2011, and a special encore was broadcast on January 13, 2011, replacing the Private Practice episode "Heaven Can Wait," which was rescheduled for February 3, 2011.

== Plot ==
The fictional, Clinica Cruz del Sur, is set in a remote, but beautiful, location in a lush tropical forest 'somewhere in South America.' Three new doctors arrive to join those already staffing the clinic. These new doctors are Lily Brenner, who specialises in emergency medicine; Mina Maynard, who specialises in infectious disease medicine; and Tommy Fuller, who specialises in plastic surgery.

Each of the young doctors works on their own specific case throughout the episode.

=== Lily Brenner ===
Lily's patient, Ed, has been involved in a collision with a tree while he was using a zipline. He is suspended from the zipline high above the valley floor by his arm which has caught in the mechanism. Lily and clinic founder, Ben, are required to go out on their own ziplines in order to free the man. Lily is forced to cut Ed's arm free of the mechanism using a scalpel.

Ed reveals that he had been reliving his honeymoon, which had led him return to the zipline. Claiming that he should never have been up there. Lily manages to free Ed and get him to the ground. Ben later reveals that he knows that Lily took a long leave of absence from her residency, and she "wasn't bad for your first day back". Lily also reveals that she lost somebody, which is why she took the time out of her residency.

Lily continues to monitor Ed throughout the night. Ed tells Lily of the 'Lago De Luz', a lake where the algae are luminescent, looking "like fireflies caught just beneath the surface". It was Ed's wife's favourite place in the world, and the place that he wants to scatter her ashes. The next morning, Ed's vitals drop dramatically. It becomes clear that he has major internal injuries. Zee, Otis and Ben perform surgery on Ed, noting that a number of his internal organs have been damaged during the collision with the tree (including his spleen and liver). When Ed starts to bleed out it becomes clear that the clinic does not have enough blood to perform a transfusion.

Ben and Lily use the milk from green coconuts as a substitute for blood. The milk has the same electrolyte balance as blood. Ben claims that he has done a coconut transfusion more times than anyone else 'down there.' Which he then qualifies meaning he has done it once before. The transfusion is successful and Ed survives.

Before he is airlifted out, Lily demands that Ed is taken to the Lago de Luz so that he can complete his trip: "Today we saved his life, now lets give him the chance to move on with it." Lily explains that she lost her fiancé, which is why she left her medical residency.

=== Mina Maynard ===
Mina is seen to be a very thorough doctor, treating a man who presents with joint pain as though he has haemorrhagic fever. When Dr. Otis Cole challenges her, she retorts that they are in a hotspot for infectious disease, to which Cole responds that sometimes it is just tennis elbow, from playing tennis. Mina then diagnoses an elderly woman with the common cold, telling her that there is nothing that she can do.

The old woman continues to linger at the clinic, much to Mina's annoyance. When the old woman collapses, Mina is forced to inject her with epinephrine in order to get her to breathe again. It is then that she diagnoses the old woman's illness as asthma.

Lily finds Mina as she is looking through the supplies to find a steroid. Mina laments that she nearly lost a patient to asthma, but she was looking for other infectious diseases. Lily says, "They say when you hear hoofbeats you should think of horses, not zebras." Mina explains that the reason she applied for the clinic was that she misdiagnosed a young boy with the flu, when 20 children a day were presenting with the flu. It turned out he had bacterial meningitis, and he died. "Sometimes it is zebras."

Mina – who has asthma – gives the old woman one of her own inhalers so that she can breathe again. In thanks for helping her to breathe, the old woman returns. This time she has brought Mina a chicken, to thank her.

=== Tommy Fuller ===
Tommy is on a housecall. He is treating a family with TB. Otis Cole had previously been treating the wife, who had been improving. However the husband stopped giving her the drugs Cole had prescribed, and so ultimately she died. It falls to Tommy to try and convince the man to let him treat his ailing children.

At first, Tommy is unsuccessful; the man doesn't want his family to be treated. So, Tommy has him sign a bit of paper absolving himself of any responsibility for their deaths. This does not go over very well with Otis Cole who reprimands Tommy, telling him to drag himself back up there and be a doctor - or don't come back.

Tommy returns the next day; he too explains his reasons for coming to the clinic. He was too proud to apologise to his parents for disappointing them, and when they told him how disappointed they were, he told them to get out of his life. A year has passed since he last saw his parents. The man agrees to let Tommy treat his family.

At the end of the episode our three young doctors are seen standing at the edge of a cliff, staring out at paradise. Lily says: "If there was anywhere to start over, this is it..."

== Reception ==
=== Ratings and viewership ===
The episode was watched by 7.57 million American viewers and received an 18-49 rating/share of 2.3/6. This is also the highest rated premiere for young adults in 15 months for ABC in that timeslot. On the night of the encore special, the show was watched by 5.87 million viewers and scored a 2.0/6 rating/share with adults 18-49, which is considered good for a repeat. In Canada, the episode was watched by 1.42 million viewers.

=== Critical reception ===
The episode received mixed reviews. Metacritic gave the episode a rating of 48 out of 100 based on 20 critical reviews. Ken Tucker of Entertainment Weekly gave the episode a C+, saying how "the episode is marred by a dreary earnestness and a smothering flood of character backstories." David Hinckley of the New York Daily News gave the episode 3 stars out of 5, saying "we get something that fans of doctor shows like Grey's Anatomy will quickly recognize: a large crowd of good-looking young folks whose deep-down dedication to doctoring is matched by their deep-down personal and romantic neuroses. ." Robert Bianco of USA Today gave the episode a poor review, saying how the show is too similar to Grey's. He says "What Map proves, as much as anything, is that Grey's is harder to mimic than it looks, even by people who work there. Grey's can be too silly and playful, but it seldom lets you forget that its main characters are competent, competitive doctors with strong opinions they're willing and able to defend. They have weight, and that's what gives the romance its appeal and the drama its gravity."
