= Grace Gummer =

American actress (born 1986)

- Gummer at the 2026 Met Gala
- Born: Grace Jane Gummer; May 9, 1986 (age 40); New York City, U.S.
- Education: Vassar College (BA)
- Occupation: Actress
- Years active: 2008–present
- Spouses: Tay Strathairn (m. 2019; div. 2020); Mark Ronson (m. 2021)
- Children: 2
- Parents: Don Gummer (father); Meryl Streep (mother)
- Relatives: Henry Wolfe Gummer (brother); Mamie Gummer (sister); Louisa Jacobson (sister); Mary Wilkinson Streep (grandmother)

Grace Jane Ronson (née Gummer, born May 9, 1986) is an American actress. She received a Theatre World Award for her Broadway debut in the 2011 revival of Arcadia. Her television work includes recurring roles in The Newsroom and American Horror Story: Freak Show, and as cast regular in Extant and Mr. Robot.

== Early life ==
Grace Gummer was born in New York City to actress Meryl Streep and sculptor Don Gummer. She grew up in Los Angeles and Connecticut alongside her older siblings: musician Henry Wolfe Gummer and actress Mamie Gummer, as well as her younger sister, actress and model Louisa Jacobson. Grace attended Poly Prep for high school.

After high school, she enrolled at Vassar College, her mother's alma mater, where she studied art history and Italian, earning her degree in 2008. During her time at Vassar, she participated in the collaborative theater group Woodshed Theater Ensemble and spent a year studying abroad in Bologna, Italy. While in Italy, Gummer worked as a docent at Dia Beacon and gained experience with costume designer Ann Roth and the Tirelli Costumi costume shop in Rome. She later interned in the design department of fashion designer Zac Posen.

== Career ==
=== 2008–2012 ===
Gummer made her screen acting debut (billed as Jane Grey) in the 1993 film The House of the Spirits, as the younger version of her mother's character, Clara del Valle. She had her next professional acting job after graduating college; in 2008, she starred Off-Off-Broadway in Lukas Bärfuss's The Sexual Neuroses of Our Parents. She originally was asked to help with the play's costume design but ended up auditioning and getting cast in its lead role.

From 2010 until 2011, she starred as Anna Moore on the TeenNick show Gigantic, which premiered on October 8, 2010. She said that she used the show "as a platform to be able to launch [herself] forward." Gummer appeared in the 2010 film Meskada, in which she played the role of Nat Collins, before playing Abby in 2010's Bashert with Paulo Costanzo. In December 2010, Gummer played the role of Hero in a Los Angeles production of Much Ado About Nothing, opposite Helen Hunt. She also had a small role as a student in Julia Roberts' class in the 2010 film Larry Crowne, which was directed by Tom Hanks; she shared many scenes in Larry Crowne with future Mr. Robot castmate Rami Malek.

In the spring of 2011, Gummer made her Broadway debut, performing the role of Chloë Coverly in the revival of Arcadia by Tom Stoppard at the Ethel Barrymore Theatre in New York. The following year, she acted in her second Broadway production, The Columnist, opposite John Lithgow.

Gummer appeared as Katie Rand on the NBC television series Smash on March 26, 2012, in the episode entitled "The Coup"; her character is a humanitarian attempting to bring peace to her divorcing parents, including her mother, played by Anjelica Huston.

=== 2013–present ===
Beginning in 2013, Gummer began having more, and higher profile, roles on television, having been cast in a series of recurring and main parts. Gummer had a recurring role as FBI agent Paige Willis on the television series Zero Hour, which aired in the early Spring of 2013. During this time, she also joined the cast of the HBO series The Newsroom. Gummer appeared in ten episodes as journalist Hallie Shea, beginning with the second episode of Season 2 on July 21, 2013. Concurrently, she starred in the online miniseries Paloma for WIGS. She also had a supporting role in the 2013 Tommy Lee Jones film The Homesman. In November 2013, she made her first appearance in the American Horror Story franchise; the following year, she appeared in seven episodes as Penny in American Horror Story: Freak Show.

In 2014 and 2015, Gummer starred alongside Halle Berry on both seasons of the Steven Spielberg CBS show Extant. She was part of the main cast for both seasons of the show. She had a supporting role in 2014's Learning to Drive and the 2015 romantic comedy Jenny's Wedding. Following the cancellation of Extant, she had a small role in the 2016 HBO film Confirmation, which was concerned with the Anita Hill controversy, and had a recurring role portraying Nora Ephron in the Amazon series Good Girls Revolt; the show would premiere a year later in November 2016.

On January 29, 2016, it was announced that Gummer had joined the cast of the USA Network series Mr. Robot as a series regular in the role of FBI field agent Dominique "Dom" DiPierro. She appeared in the final three seasons of the show, which premiered in July 2016, October 2017, and October 2019, respectively.

Between filming seasons of Mr. Robot, Gummer acted in the comedy The Long Dumb Road and the action-thriller Beast of Burden in which she co-starred opposite Daniel Radcliffe; both films premiered in 2018. She also had a small role in the Billy Crystal film Standing Up, Falling Down, which premiered in Spring 2019.

Gummer also returned to theater during this time. She had a supporting role in the off-Broadway play Mary Page Marlowe, which began previews in June 2018. In Fall 2018, she filmed The Hot Zone for National Geographic, in which she appears in four of the six episodes; the show aired in Spring 2019. After filming the final season of Mr. Robot during the first half of 2019, Gummer joined the cast of The Public Theater's production of A Bright Room Called Day, which opened in November 2019.

== Personal life ==
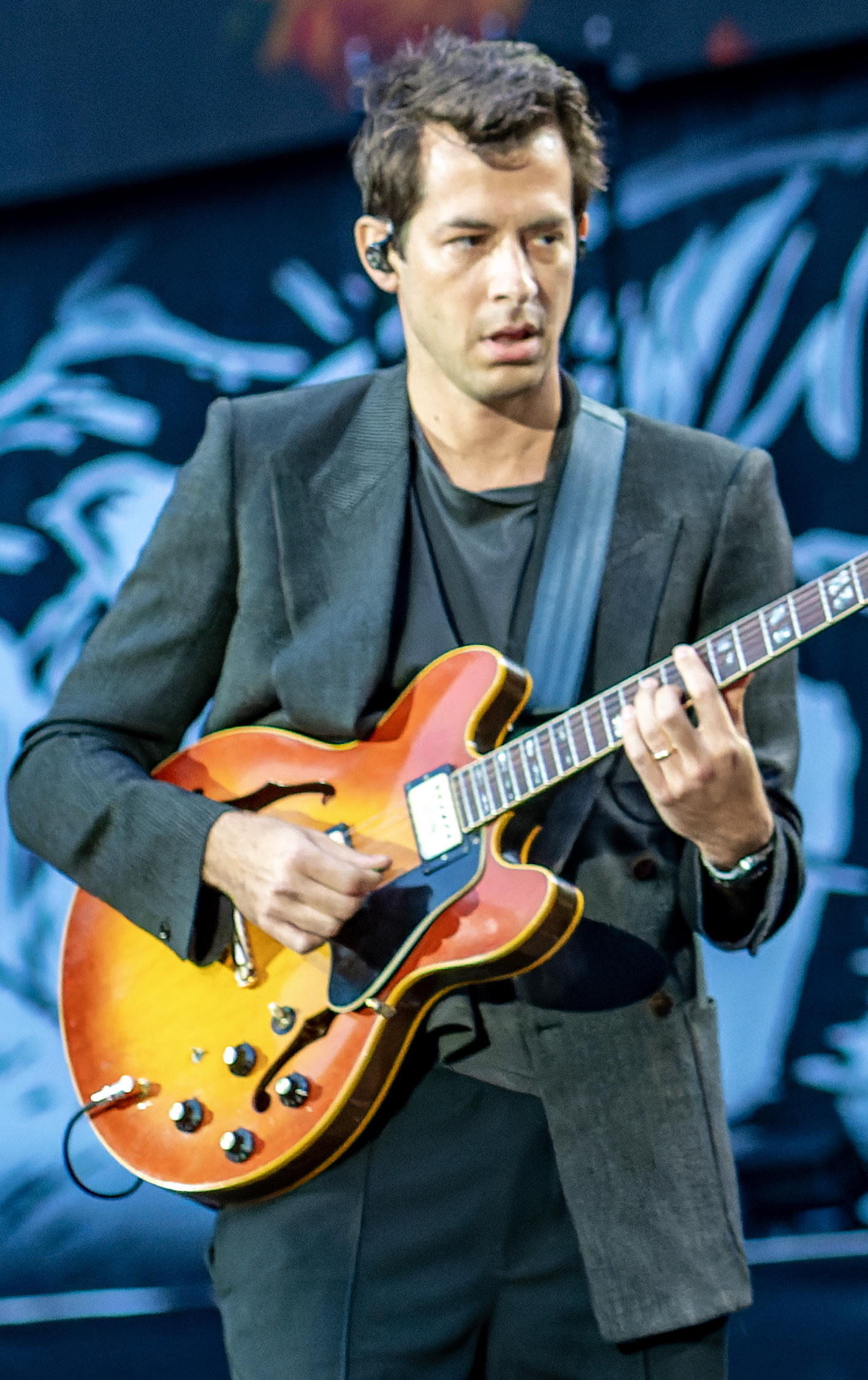
Gummer has been married to musician Mark Ronson since 2021.

Gummer speaks Italian. She lives in Los Angeles.

On July 10, 2019, Gummer married musician Tay Strathairn, the son of actor David Strathairn. The couple separated on August 21, 2019, after 42 days of marriage. Gummer filed for divorce on March 23, 2020, in Los Angeles, and the divorce was finalized in August 2020.

On September 4, 2021, it was announced that Gummer had married British-American musician and record producer Mark Ronson after one year of dating. Their first child, a daughter, was born in December 2022. On December 20, 2024, it was announced that Gummer and Ronson were expecting their second child together. On February 21, 2025, Gummer and Ronson welcomed their second daughter.

== Filmography ==
=== Film ===
Year	Title	Role	Notes
1993	The House of the Spirits	Young Clara del Valle	
2010	Meskada	Nat Collins	
2010	Bashert	Abby	Short film
2011	Larry Crowne	Natalie Calimeris	
2012	Frances Ha	Rachel	
2013	The Homesman	Arabella Sours	
2014	Learning to Drive	Tasha Shields	
2015	Jenny's Wedding	Anne Farrell	
2018	The Long Dumb Road	Nina	
2018	Beast of Burden	Jen	
2019	Standing Up, Falling Down	Megan	
2025	Springsteen: Deliver Me from Nowhere	Barbara Landau	

=== Television ===
Year	Title	Role	Notes
2010–2011	Gigantic	Anna Moore	18 episodes
2012–2013	Smash	Katie Rand	2 episodes
2013	Zero Hour	FBI Agent Paige Willis	6 episodes
2013	American Horror Story: Coven	Millie	Episode: "The Axeman Cometh"
2013–2014	Paloma	Paloma	5 episodes
2013–2014	The Newsroom	Hallie Shea	10 episodes
2014–2015	Extant	Julie Gelineau	Main cast; 21 episodes
2014–2015	American Horror Story: Freak Show	Penny	7 episodes
2016	Confirmation	Ricki Seidman	Television film
2016	Good Girls Revolt	Nora Ephron	6 episodes
2016–2019	Mr. Robot	Dominique DiPierro	Main cast; 31 episodes
2018	That's Harassment	Herself	Short
2019	The Hot Zone	Melinda Danport	Miniseries; 4 episodes
2020	A Teacher	Chloe	Episode: "Episode 9"
2021	Dr. Death	Kim Morgan	6 episodes
2022	Let the Right One In	Claire Logan	Main cast
2024	American Horror Story: Delicate	Margaret Alcott	Recurring role; 2 episodes
2025	All's Fair	Grace Henry	Episode: "Pilot"
2026	Love Story: John F. Kennedy Jr. & Carolyn Bessette	Caroline Kennedy	Main cast; 9 episodes

== Theater ==
Year	Title	Role	Venue
2008	The Sexual Neuroses of Our Parents	Dora	Wild Project
2010	Much Ado About Nothing	Hero	Kirk Douglas Theatre
2011	Arcadia	Chloë Coverly	Ethel Barrymore Theatre
2012	The Columnist	Abigail	Samuel J. Friedman Theatre
2018	Mary Page Marlowe	Roberta Marlowe	Second Stage Theatre
2019	A Bright Room Called Day	Paulinka Erdnuss	The Public Theater
