= Lying (film) =

- Promotional poster
- Directed by: M. Blash
- Written by: M. Blash
- Produced by: Molly Hassell; David Guy Levy; Jade Healy; Tricia van Klaveren; M. Blash
- Starring: Chloë Sevigny; Jena Malone; Leelee Sobieski; Halley Wegryn Gross; Maya Goldsmith; Henry Gummer; P.J. Verhoest
- Edited by: Beatrice Sišul
- Music by: Christopher Doulgeris
- Release dates: May 28, 2006 (Cannes); May 12, 2009 (DVD); September 11, 2009 (re-release)
- Running time: 94 minutes
- Country: United States
- Language: English
- Budget: <$1 million

Lying is a 2006 American psychological drama film by writer and first-time director M. Blash. It stars Chloë Sevigny, Jena Malone, Leelee Sobieski, and Henry Gummer. and premiered at the Directors Fortnight sidebar at the 2006 Cannes Film Festival. The film had a limited US release in 2008, followed by a DVD release in May 2009 and a small theatrical re-release in September 2009.

While the film follows a fairly loose, ambiguous narrative, it focuses on a group of acquaintances who spend the weekend together at a remote country house; the situation becomes complex throughout the days, though, as one of the women turns out to be a pathological liar.

== Plot ==
Megan, an heiress, invites a woman from her yoga class, Linda, and two interns from her museum job, Grace and Hella, to spend a weekend with her at her large country home in upstate New York. The women arrive together, and Megan prepares a meal which they eat outside at a picnic table. She comments that the phone lines are down, so they will not be able to contact anyone for the weekend. Grace poses prying questions toward Megan during the dinner, specifically regarding Megan's deceased parents from whom she inherited the home. Hella chastises Grace for being confrontational. Megan brings each of them crystal gardens she has prepared in jars. The four women go for a walk in the woods at night, and are frightened by Henry, Megan's brother, who arrives unannounced. Grace remarks that Megan never mentioned having a brother. Megan asks Henry to leave that night, claiming that Hella's fiancé left her and they need a girls only weekend.

The next morning, Megan encounters a young boy in the woods who claims to be lost. He explains that he was camping with his family, and talks to her about he wants to be in the army. Meanwhile, Sarah, a neighbor whose house borders Megan's property, observes the women from her kitchen. She goes outside and waves flags in the air to capture their attention to no avail. The women play croquet together, and Megan comments that Henry is working on a novel. Linda is confused, as she recalled Megan telling her Henry was in a band. Later, Megan finds Hella attempting to use the phone.

That night, all four women get drunk on wine, and collectively hear the sound of a woman singing coming from various places inside the house. They make a game out of it, chasing the voice, attempting to locate its source. When Megan traces it to the fireplace, the voice disappears. The following morning, the women stage a video art project outside. Sarah arrives and observes the scene, but is ushered away by Megan. She asks Megan if her parents are coming to visit, to which Megan responds no, and explains that they will be leaving in the morning. Megan asks Sarah about her deceased parents, and the nature of a pending settlement. Megan invites Sarah for breakfast the next morning.

Meanwhile, Grace snoops around the house and finds Megan's passport. During dinner, the women discuss Sarah, and Megan comments that she purchased the plot of land next to Sarah's and had the house built. Grace questions this, as the house appears old. Grace challenges Megan again when she claims that locusts migrate to the arctic each year. Grace later tells Hella that Megan has lied about her age. In the morning, Grace confronts Hella and Linda with a cache of bills and paperwork she discovered in a drawer, indicating that Megan has been lying about the house being hers. The three women leave.

Sarah arrives for breakfast, and finds Megan alone. Megan says the three women had to get back to the city. Sarah tells Megan that a young boy was just found after having gone missing while camping nearby with his family; she explains that the boy alleged to have seen a woman who refused to help him, and that the authorities have chalked it up to him having a hallucination. Megan does not admit to her encounter with him. The two enter the house to prepare breakfast.

== Cast ==
- Chloë Sevigny as Megan
- Jena Malone as Grace
- Maya Goldsmith as Linda
- Halley Wegryn Gross as Hella
- Leelee Sobieski as Sarah
- Henry Gummer as Henry
- P.J. Verhoest as Boy

== Production ==
M. Blash wrote a minimal script for the film, and shared it with eventual producer Molly Hassell (PCH Film/Catfish Prods.) in 2005. In June of that year, the project was given the go-ahead and actresses Chloe Sevigny and Jena Malone were attached to star in it. It was filmed in November 2005 in the New York town of Millerton.
