= Sam Fleischner =

American filmmaker

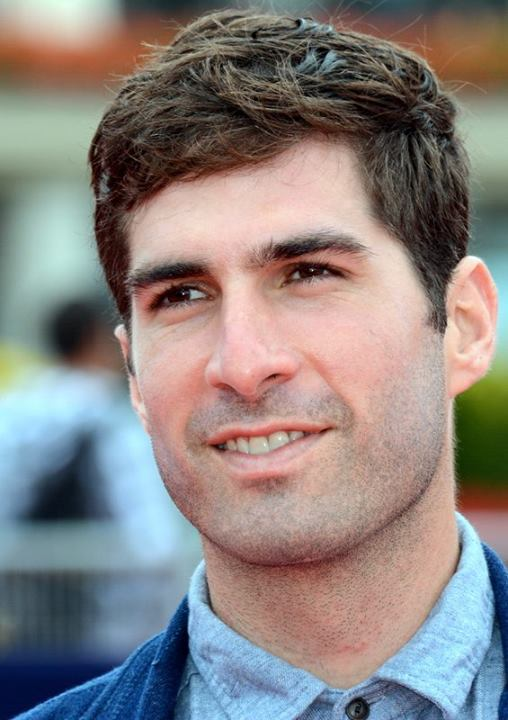
Fleischner in 2013 at the Deauville American Film Festival.

Sam Fleischner is an American filmmaker based in New York. Fleischner is the son of the artist Richard Fleischner.

== Career ==
Fleischner graduated from Wesleyan University in 2006 with a degree in film studies. Starting with short films in 2005, he co-produced the 2009 film The Distance Between the Apple and the Tree.

His first narrative feature, Wah Do Dem, which he wrote and directed with childhood friend Ben Chace, won the jury prize for best film at the 2009 Los Angeles Film Festival.

He was cinematographer on the 2011 film Loosies. His next feature as director, Stand Clear of the Closing Doors, was funded by Kickstarter, reaching its US$35,000 target in August 2012, and won the Special Jury Prize in the Narrative Feature Section at the 2013 Tribeca Film Festival. In August 2013 the North American rights to the film were acquired by Oscilloscope Laboratories.

Fleischner was a producer and cinematographer on the 2016 comedy, Donald Cried. His 2025 documentary, Jetty features an original soundtrack by Animal Collective and received praise from Richard Brody in a New Yorker review.

He has directed music videos for MGMT, Panda Bear, and Santigold, among others.

Fleischner co-founded Rockaway Film Festival in 2018.
