= Cow Creek (South Umpqua River tributary) =

River in Oregon, United States

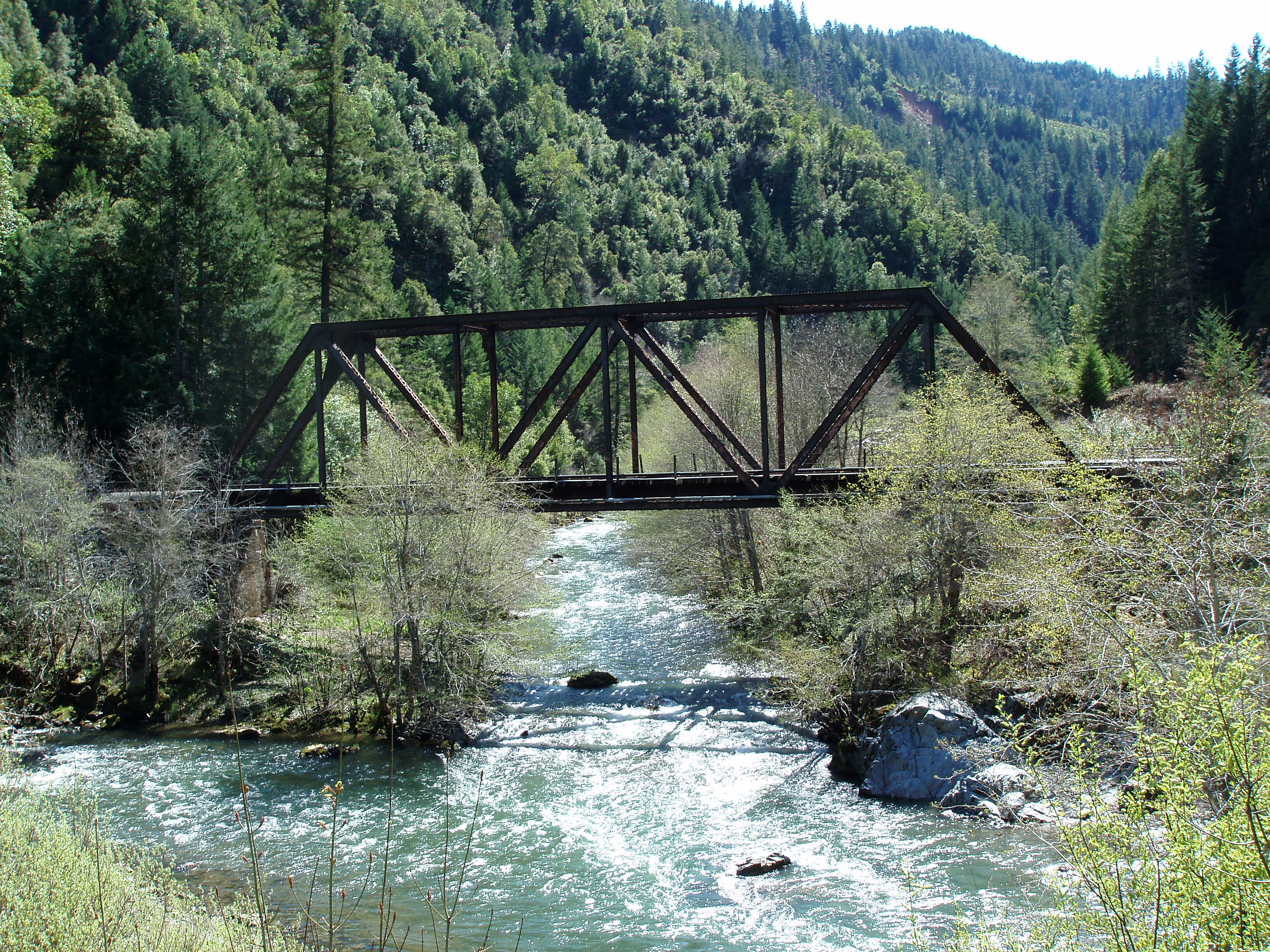
- West Fork Bridge over Cow Creek

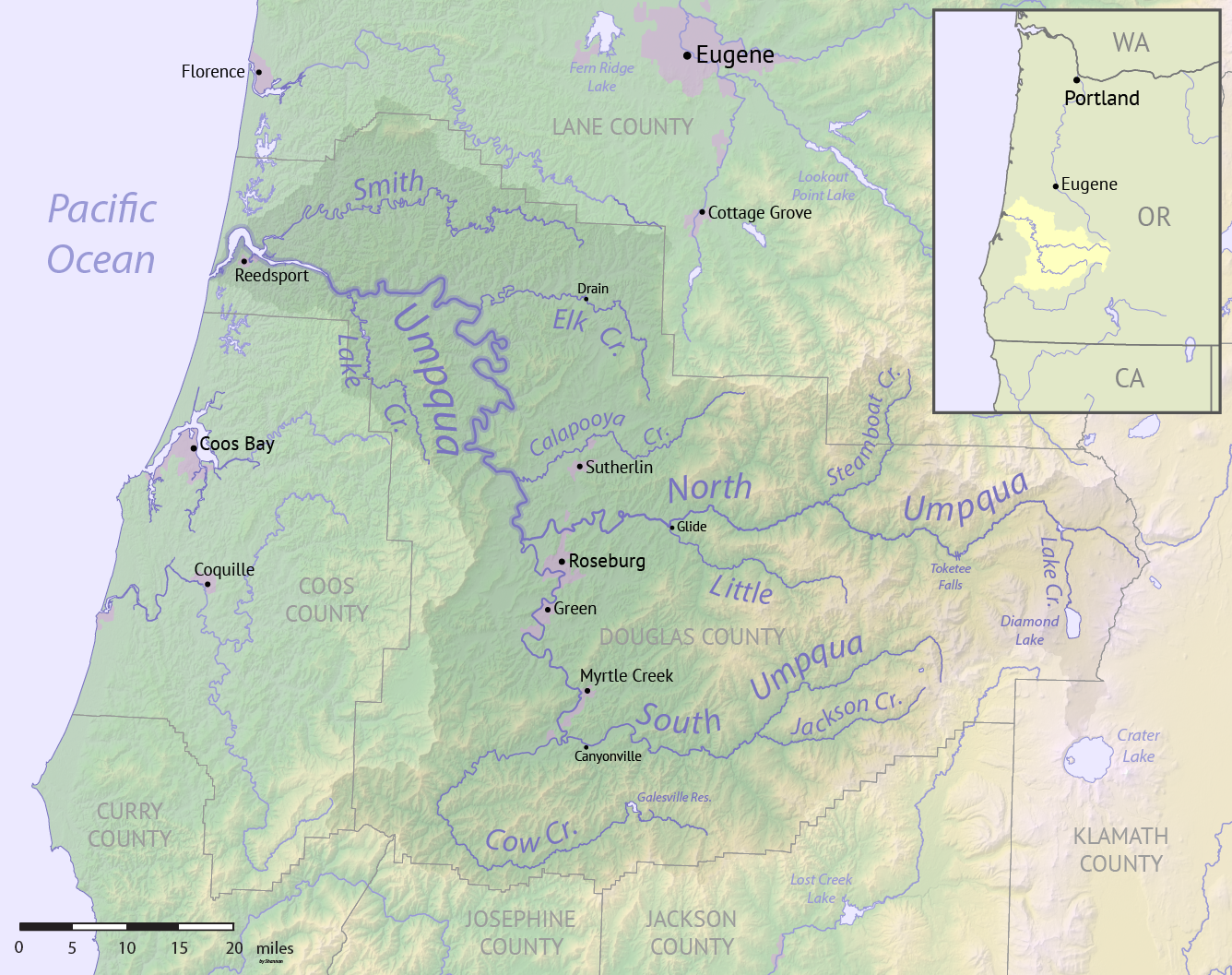
- Map of the Umpqua River watershed including Cow Creek (the C-shaped watercourse near the bottom)

Location
- Country: United States
- State: Oregon

Physical characteristics
- Source: South Fork Cow Creek
  - location: A mile north of Round Top, Jackson County, Umpqua National Forest
  - coordinates: 42°43′34″N 122°59′44″W
  - elevation: 4,000 ft (1,200 m)
- 2nd source: East Fork Cow Creek
  - location: Richter Mountain, Umpqua National Forest
  - coordinates: 42°46′02″N 122°55′53″W
  - elevation: 4,500 ft (1,400 m)
- Source confluence: About 3 miles (4.8 km) east-southeast of Devils Flat
  - location: Umpqua National Forest, Douglas County
  - coordinates: 42°48′06″N 122°59′26″W
  - elevation: 2,402 ft (732 m)
- Mouth: South Umpqua River
  - location: Canyonville, Douglas County
  - coordinates: 42°56′49″N 123°20′16″W
  - elevation: 636 ft (194 m)
- Length: 44 mi (71 km), East-west
- Basin size: 456 sq mi (1,180 km^{2})
- Discharge
  - average: 856 cu ft/s (24.2 m^{3}/s)
  - minimum: 7.4 cu ft/s (0.21 m^{3}/s)
  - maximum: 38,400 cu ft/s (1,090 m^{3}/s)

Basin features
- River system: South Umpqua River

Cow Creek is a medium-sized river in southwestern Oregon, a tributary of the South Umpqua River. It drains an area of over 400 square miles (1,000 km^{2}) on the western foothills of the Cascade Range and within the Oregon Coast Range. Although the vast majority of the basin is within Douglas County, a tiny portion in the southeast extends into northern Jackson County.

== Course ==
The stream rises in the Umpqua National Forest at the confluence of South Fork Cow Creek and East Fork Cow Creek. The south fork, which is much larger, is sometimes considered the main stem. In its first few miles the creek flows west through an agricultural valley and through Galesville Reservoir. Cow Creek runs alongside Interstate 5 for several miles and receives Windy Creek from the right at Glendale, Oregon. The stream then bends northwest into a canyon, receiving West Fork Cow Creek on the left and Middle Creek from the right. It then continues northwards, bending steadily eastwards and doubling back on its former course. The river emerges from the mountains near Riddle, and bends sharply south around a ridge, joining the South Umpqua about 2 miles (3 km) west of Canyonville.

== See also ==
- List of longest streams of Oregon
- Cow Creek Band of Umpqua Tribe of Indians
