= Dancing in Jaffa =

- Hebrew: רוקדים ביפו
- Directed by: Hilla Medalia
- Starring: Pierre Dulaine
- Distributed by: IFC Films
- Release date: 2013
- Running time: 86 minutes
- Country: Israel

Dancing in Jaffa is a 2013 Israeli documentary film.

The film follows Palestinian dance instructor Pierre Dulaine teaching 150 Jewish and Arab Israeli children to dance.

== Production ==
Diane Nabatoff introduced Pierre Dulaine to director Hilla Medalia.

== Reception ==
English film critic Mark Kermode praised the film's uplifting tone, suggesting that only the "very hard‑hearted" would fail to be moved by it.
