= Henry Wolfe =

American singer-songwriter and actor

- Born: Henry Wolfe Gummer; November 13, 1979 (age 47); New York City, U.S.
- Education: Dartmouth College (BA)
- Occupations: Songwriter; musician; singer; actor
- Spouse: Tamryn Storm Hawker (m. 2019)
- Children: 2
- Parents: Don Gummer (father); Meryl Streep (mother)
- Relatives: Mamie Gummer (sister); Grace Gummer (sister); Louisa Jacobson (sister); Mark Ronson (brother-in-law); Mary Wilkinson Streep (grandmother)

Henry Wolfe Gummer (born November 13, 1979) is an American singer-songwriter and actor.

== Early life ==
Wolfe is the son of actress Meryl Streep and sculptor Don Gummer. He grew up in Los Angeles and Connecticut, with his younger sisters, actresses Grace Gummer, Mamie Gummer, and Louisa Jacobson.

Wolfe attended the Hotchkiss School and graduated from Dartmouth College in 2002.

== Music ==
Wolfe first made his mark as a musician as co-founder of the New York indie pop band Bravo Silva. Bravo Silva released an EP entitled 'July' in 2004 and an eponymous full-length album in 2005.

Following Bravo Silva's dissolution, Wolfe moved to Los Angeles and began to perform as a solo act under his current moniker. In 2009, Wolfe released two EPs: The Blue House, composed of original material, and Wolfe Sings Field, made up of songs penned by Portland-based writer Peter Field. Wolfe's full-length debut, entitled 'Linda Vista' was released in 2011 on Wolfe's own Undermountain Music label. Produced by Aaron Older and Nico Aglietti of Edward Sharpe and the Magnetic Zeroes and featuring members of Edward Sharpe and the Magnetic Zeroes, Dawes and Ariel Pink's Haunted Graffiti, Linda Vista was received positively by music critics such as Rolling Stone Magazine and led to Wolfe being named as an "artist to watch" by the Los Angeles Times.

On March 2, 2011, Wolfe made his network television debut as a musical guest on Jimmy Kimmel Live!, performing "Someone Else" and "Stop the Train" from his Linda Vista album. He also gave an in-studio performance for WNYC Soundcheck with John Schaefer in May 2011.

Wolfe's songs have been licensed in major motion pictures with "Someone Else" being featured in the film Terri directed by Azazel Jacobs and starring John C. Reilly, and an early version of "Stop the Train" appearing in Julie & Julia. Azazel Jacobs directed the music video for "Someone Else" which starred Brit Marling.

== Acting career ==
Wolfe has appeared in numerous films, including the 2006 film Lying and the 2011 film The Wait, both directed by M Blash. Wolfe had a small role in The Good Shepherd and appeared in a film titled Wolfe with an E, directed by David Louis Zuckerman.

== Personal life ==
Wolfe has been married to Tamryn Storm Hawker since June 2019. They had their first child, a daughter, in July 2020. Their son was born in May 2022.

== Discography ==
- July EP (2004) – as a member of Bravo Silva
- Bravo Silva (2005) – as a member of Bravo Silva
- The Blue House (2009)
- Wolf Sings Field (2009)
- Linda Vista (2011)
- Encino (2014)
- Asilomar (2015)
