= M. Blash =

American film director

- Born: 1978 (age 46–47); California, U.S.
- Occupations: Film director; screenwriter; actor

M. Blash (born 1978) is an American film director, screenwriter, actor, and visual artist. He has written and directed several independent films, including the improvisational drama Lying (2006), and the dramatic thriller The Wait (2013).

== Biography ==
Blash was born in 1978 in southern California, and raised in Portland, Oregon. He attended New York University and the School of Visual Arts, as well as Charles University in Prague.

His directorial debut, Lying (2006), was completed for a budget of $150,000 in upstate New York, and starred Jena Malone, Chloë Sevigny, and Leelee Sobieski. The film premiered at the Directors' Fortnight at the 2006 Cannes Film Festival. In 2007, he had a minor role in Gus van Sant's Paranoid Park. Blash directed the music video for "Money" by The Drums.

Blash is also a visual artist, and has exhibited his drawings at the Bullseye Gallery in Portland. In 2008, a series of his drawings were published in The New York Times. His second film, the supernatural drama The Wait (2013), also starred Sevigny and Malone, as well as Luke Grimes and Josh Hamilton.

== Filmography ==
Year	Title	Role	Notes	Ref.
2006	Lying	—	Director and writer	
2007	Paranoid Park	Math Teacher		
2008	Wendy and Lucy	Dan		
2009	Sibling Topics (Section A)	Porn Foreign Peopled		
2013	The Wait	—	Director and writer	
2016	Kitty	Cop	Short film	
