= Azalea, Oregon =

Unincorporated community in Oregon, US

Coordinates: 42.79556°N 123.25917°W

Azalea (formerly Starveout, Starve Out, and Booth) is an unincorporated community in Douglas County, Oregon, United States. It is located approximately 10 miles (16 km) northeast of Glendale on Interstate 5. It is at an elevation of 1,657 feet (505 m).

Azalea was named for the abundance of azaleas in the area, including the Azalea occidentalis and the Azaleastrum albiflorum. The name Azalea was used for two different post offices in the upper Cow Creek Valley in Douglas County. A post office named "Starveout" was established in 1888. The name was changed to "Booth" in 1907 and to "Azalea" in 1914. There was a different Azalea post office in the area that ran from 1899 to 1909. Its USPS assigned ZIP Code is 97410.

Azalea is the hometown of decathlete and Olympian Tom Pappas.

== See also ==
- Disappearance of Thomas Gibson
