= Mr. Marmalade =

2004 play by Noah Haidle

Mr. Marmalade is a black comedy play written by Noah Haidle. It follows Lucy, a four-year-old girl in New Jersey, and how she views adult life. It premiered in Costa Mesa, California, on April 25, 2004, by South Coast Repertory and starred Eliza Pryor Nagel as Lucy, Glen Fleshier as Mr. Marmalade, Guilford Adams as Larry and Marc Vietor as Bradley.

== Plot ==
The play is set in the living room in New Jersey

One
Of the strained relationship of Lucy and her imaginary friend Mr. Marmalade

The play begins with Lucy, a four-year-old girl, sitting by herself in the living room, playing with a Ken and Barbie. Mr. Marmalade appears, and the two begin to play tea. Mr. Marmalade asks Lucy if she's angry with him, who says she just wishes he wasn't too busy. Sookie, Lucy's mother, interrupts the tea party and asks Lucy which dress she should wear. Mr. Marmalade, who Sookie cannot see, suggests the red one. Sookie leaves and Mr. M and Lucy return to their conversation. Mr. M tells Lucy he will take her to Mexico, to Cabo San Lucas. Their happiness is put at an end when Mr. Marmalade is sent back to the office, leaving Lucy alone again. Sookie then re-enters and tells Lucy that the babysitter, Emily, will be there in half an hour. Sookie then leaves, leaving Lucy alone once more.

Two
Of the conversation between Lucy and Emily the Babysitter, during which they talk about Mr. Marmalade and his delinquent behavior and how men are like that in general unless you keep them in line

The scene opens with Emily watching TV while Lucy is “on the phone” with Mr. Marmalade. Emily also pretends to call Mr. Marmalade, angering Lucy. Lucy then demands that she wants to have a tea party. Emily reluctantly agrees, and they have a tea party together, but Emily cuts it short to smoke a cigarette. She leaves and Bradley, Mr. Marmalade's assistant, enters, much to Lucy's excitement, and enthusiastically joins the tea party. Lucy asks why he is wearing sunglasses indoors at night, but Bradley evades the question. She also asks if there has been any more word about Mexico, but Bradley hasn't heard anything, citing that Mr. Marmalade is busy. Before Bradley can leave, Lucy pulls off his glasses to reveal a black eye. He initially claims that it was an accident, but then admits that he received it for forgetting Mr. Marmalade's dry cleaning.

He leaves and Emily returns. Emily's boyfriend, George, arrives despite Lucy's claim that he is not allowed. George brings his step-brother, Larry, with him, and goes upstairs with Emily, apparently to have sex. Lucy and Larry talk to each other about their lives. Larry reveals that he has to repeat preschool, claiming that he didn't have enough friends. He quickly admits that the real reason was due to petty theft and a suicide attempt. Lucy offers to play doctor and asks him to take his shirt off. She pretends to replace his heart, but then asks him to take his pants off. Larry eventually agrees, and after she inspects him, they switch roles. Lucy ends the scene pretending to be in pain, saying, “you'll have to inspect me from head to toe.”
