= Jena Malone on screen and stage =

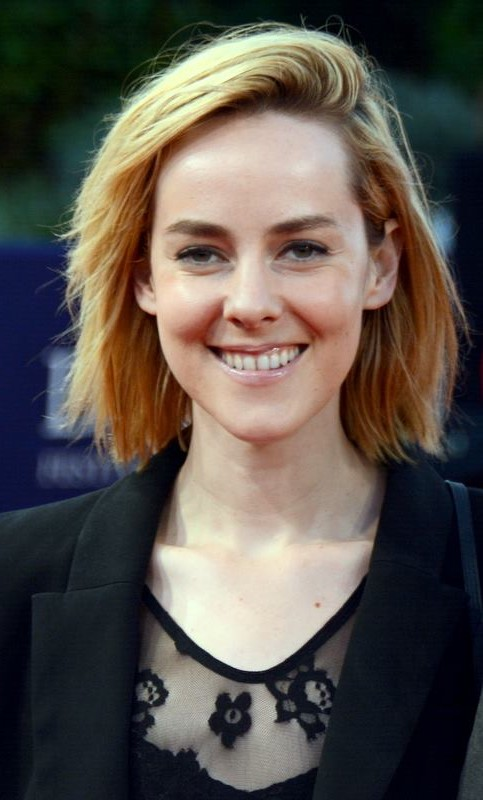
Malone in 2013

Jena Malone is an American actress who has appeared in over 40 feature films since beginning her career as a child actor in 1996. She gained critical acclaim for her film debut in Anjelica Huston's Bastard Out of Carolina (1996), followed by supporting parts in major studio films such as Contact (1997) with Jodie Foster and Stepmom with Julia Roberts (1998). She subsequently had roles in the cult film Donnie Darko, and the drama Life as a House (both 2001), before having starring roles in the independent American Girl (2002), the dark comedy Saved! (2004), and the drama The Ballad of Jack and Rose (2005).

She co-starred as Lydia Bennet in the 2005 adaptation of Pride & Prejudice before making her Broadway theater debut as Sister James in Doubt, in 2006. Subsequent film roles include supporting parts in the arthouse drama Lying, the biographical drama Into the Wild (2007), and the supernatural horror film The Ruins (2008). In 2011, she appeared in the action film Sucker Punch before being cast as Johanna Mason in three films of The Hunger Games film series from 2013 to 2015. She also had roles in Nicolas Winding Refn's controversial horror film The Neon Demon, and Tom Ford's thriller Nocturnal Animals (both 2016). In 2021, she starred in Adopting Audrey.

== Film ==
Key
†	Denotes films that have not yet been released

Year	Title	Role	Notes	Ref.
1996	Bastard Out of Carolina	Ruth Anne "Bone" Boatwright		
1997	Contact	young Ellie Arroway		
1998	Stepmom	Anna Harrison		
1999	The Book of Stars	Mary McGuire		
1999	For Love of the Game	Heather Aubrey		
2000	Cheaters	Jolie Fitch		
2001	Donnie Darko	Gretchen Ross		
2001	Life as a House	Alyssa Beck		
2002	The Dangerous Lives of Altar Boys	Margie Flynn		
2002	The Badge	Ashley Hardwick		
2002	American Girl	Rena Grubb	Also co-producer	
2003	The United States of Leland	Becky Pollard		
2003	Cold Mountain	Ferry Girl		
2004	Saved!	Mary Cummings		
2004	Corn	Emily Rasmussen		
2004	Howl's Moving Castle	Lettie (voice)	English dub	
2005	The Ballad of Jack and Rose	Red Berry		
2005	Pride & Prejudice	Lydia Bennet		
2006	Container	The Woman / Speaker (voices)		
2006	Lying	Grace		
2007	Four Last Songs	Frankie		
2007	The Go-Getter	Joely		
2007	Into the Wild	Carine McCandless / Additional Narrator		
2008	The Ruins	Amy		
2009	The Messenger	Kelly		
2009	The Soloist	Cheery Lab Tech		
2010	Five Star Day	Sarah Reynolds		
2011	Sucker Punch	Rocket		
2012	For Ellen	Susan		
2012	In Our Nature	Andie		
2013	Center Jenny	Nark Vision1	Short film	
2013	The Painted Lady	The Painted Lady	Short film	
2013	Teenage	American Girl (voice)	Documentary	
2013	The Wait	Angela		
2013	The Hunger Games: Catching Fire	Johanna Mason		
2014	10 Cent Pistol	Danneel		
2014	Time Out of Mind	Maggie Hammond		
2014	Inherent Vice	Hope Harlingen		
2014	The Hunger Games: Mockingjay – Part 1	Johanna Mason	Cameo	
2015	Angelica	Constance		
2015	The Hunger Games: Mockingjay – Part 2	Johanna Mason		
2016	Lovesong	Mindy		
2016	Batman v Superman: Dawn of Justice	Jenet Klyburn	Ultimate Edition only	
2016	The Neon Demon	Ruby		
2016	Nocturnal Animals	Sage Ross		
2017	Bottom of the World	Scarlett		
2018	The Public	Myra		
2020	Lorelei	Dolores	Also executive producer	
2020	Antebellum	Elizabeth Denton		
2020	Stardust	Angie Bowie		
2021	Adopting Audrey	Audrey		
2022	Swallowed	Alice		
2023	Consecration	Dr. Grace Fario		
2023	Rebel Moon: Part One – A Child of Fire	Harmada		
2024	Junk	Jessica		
2024	Love Lies Bleeding	Bethany "Beth" Langston		
2024	Horizon: An American Saga – Chapter 1	Ellen Harvey/Lucy		
2024	Horizon: An American Saga – Chapter 2	Ellen Harvey/Lucy		
2025	One Battle After Another	Greeting Code (voice)	Cameo	
2027	Pendulum		Completed	
TBA	The Movers		Post-production	

== Television ==
Year	Title	Role	Notes	Ref.
1996	Hidden in America	Willa Januson	Television film	
1996	Chicago Hope	Stacy Morissey	Episode: "Sweet Surrender"	
1996	Roseanne	Little Girl	Episode: "Home for the Holidays"	
1997	Hope	Lilly Kate Burns	Television film	
1997	Ellen Foster	Ellen Foster	Television film	
1998	Homicide: Life on the Street	Debbie Straub	2 episodes	
1999	Touched by an Angel	Casey	Episode: "Hearts"	
2000	Cheaters	Jolie Fitch	Television film	
2001	The Ballad of Lucy Whipple	California Morning "Lucy" Whipple	Television film	
2003	Hitler: The Rise of Evil	Geli Raubal	2 episodes	
2008	Law & Order	Michelle Landon	Episode: "Lost Boys"	
2011	Robot Chicken	Boy George / Singer (voices)	Episode: "Beastmaster and Commander"	
2012	Hatfields & McCoys	Nancy McCoy	3 episodes	
2012	Dakota	Dakota	3 episodes	
2019	Too Old to Die Young	Diana	6 episodes	
2021	Goliath	Samantha Margolis	8 episodes	
2026	The Boroughs	Claire Cooper	8 episodes	

== Music videos ==
Year	Title	Artist	Director	Role
1995	"Childhood"	Michael Jackson	Nick Brandt	actress
2010	"Berkeley Girl"	Harper Simon	Benjamin Kutsko	actress
2011	"I Think Bad Thoughts"	Danko Jones	Diamond Brothers	actress
2011	"Electric Love"	Dirty Vegas	James Gooding	actress
2011	"Time"	Sky White Tiger	Frank G. DeMarco	actress
2012	"True Vulture"	Death Grips	Galen Pehrson	voices, additional sound design
2013	"I Don't Recall"	Lavender Diamond	Jena Malone	director
2014	"Harlem River"	Kevin Morby	Adarsha Benjamin	actress
2014	"Dead Rabbit Hopes"	The Shoe	Alia Penner	singer, actress
2014	"Broken Hearted Love Song"	The Shoe	Benjamin Kutsko	singer, actress
2014	"His Gorgeousness"	The Shoe	Aliya Naumoff	singer, actress
2014	"Encino"	Henry Wolfe	Benjamin Kutsko	actress

== Stage ==
Year	Title	Role	Notes
2006	Doubt	Sister James	Broadway
2009	Mourning Becomes Electra	Lavinia Mannon	Off-Broadway
