= List of awards and nominations received by Jena Malone =

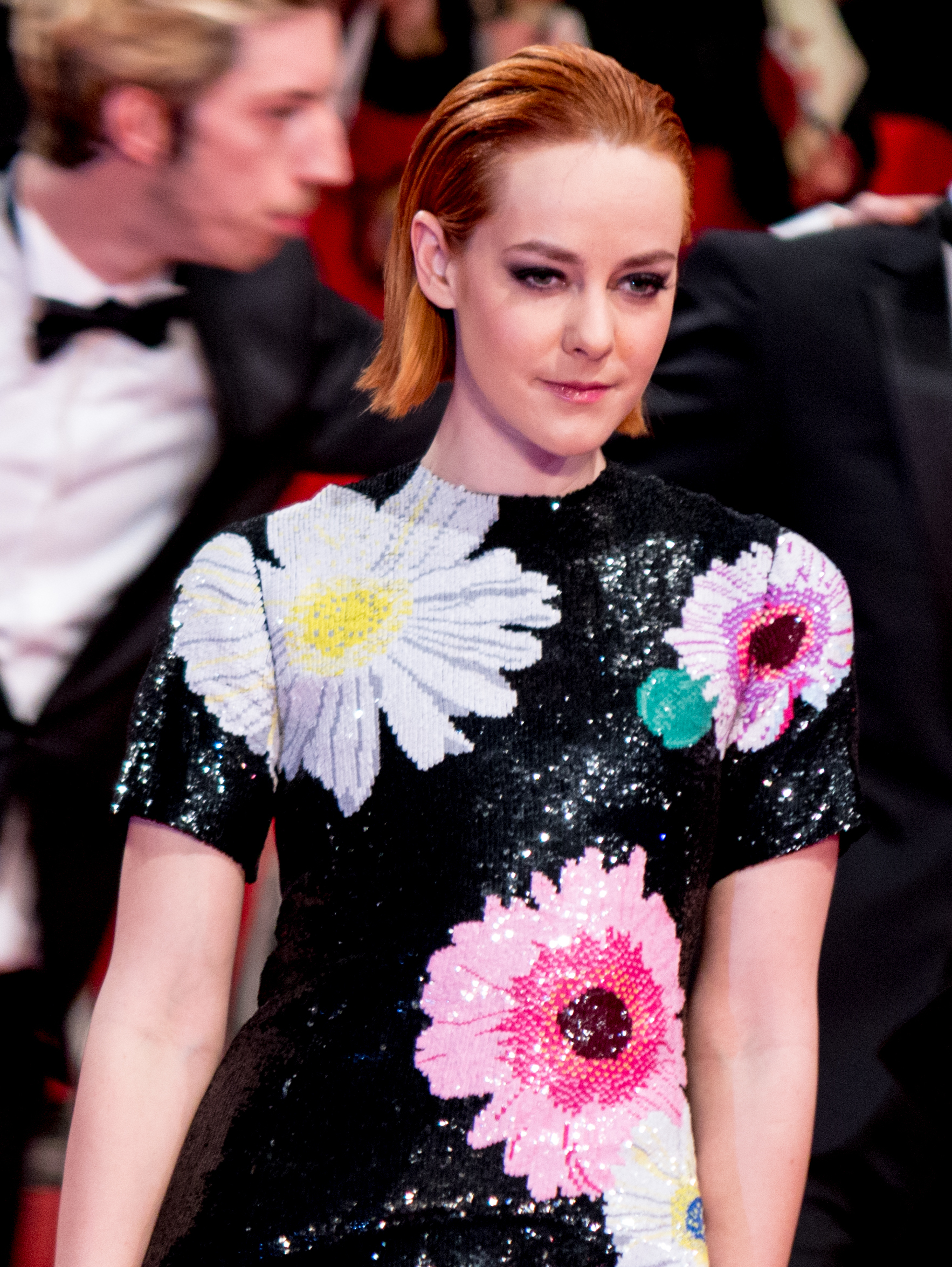
Malone at the 65th Berlin International Film Festival

Jena Malone is an American actress who first gained critical recognition for her screen debut in Bastard out of Carolina (1996), for which she was nominated for an Independent Spirit Award, a Screen Actors Guild Award, and a Satellite Award. She gained further recognition for her role in the television film Hope, for which she was nominated for a Golden Globe Award for Best Actress in a Miniseries or Television Film. In 1998, Malone won a Saturn Award for Best Performance by a Younger Actor for her role in Contact (1997).

== CableACE Awards ==
Year	Nominated work	Category	Result	Ref.
1997	Bastard out of Carolina	Best Actress in a Movie or Miniseries	Nominated	

== Fangoria Chainsaw Awards ==
Year	Nominated work	Category	Result	Ref.
2017	The Neon Demon	Best Supporting Actress	Won	

== Gold Derby Awards ==
Year	Nominated work	Category	Result	Ref.
2008	Into the Wild	Best Ensemble Cast	Nominated	

== Golden Globe Awards ==
The Golden Globe Award is an accolade bestowed by the 93 members of the Hollywood Foreign Press Association (HFPA) recognizing excellence in film and television, both domestic and foreign.

Year	Nominated work	Category	Result	Ref.
1998	Hope	Best Actress in a Miniseries or Television Film	Nominated	

== Independent Spirit Awards ==
The Independent Spirit Awards are presented annually by Film Independent, to award best in the independent filmmaking.

Year	Nominated work	Category	Result	Ref.
1997	Bastard out of Carolina	Best Debut Performance	Nominated	
2015	Inherent Vice	Robert Altman Award	Won	

== Satellite Awards ==
The Satellite Awards are presented annually by the International Press Academy.

Year	Nominated work	Category	Result	Ref.
1997	Bastard out of Carolina	Best Actress – Miniseries or Television Film	Nominated	
2005	Saved!	Best Actress – Motion Picture Musical or Comedy	Nominated	

== Saturn Awards ==
The Saturn Awards are presented annually by the Academy of Science Fiction, Fantasy and Horror Films to honor science fiction, fantasy, and horror films, television, and home video.

Year	Nominated work	Category	Result	Ref.
1998	Contact	Best Performance by a Younger Actor	Won	
2013	The Hunger Games: Catching Fire	Best Supporting Actress	Nominated	

== Screen Actors Guild Awards ==
Established in 1995, the Screen Actors Guild Awards are presented annually by the Screen Actors Guild‐American Federation of Television and Radio Artists, and aim to recognize excellent achievements in film and television.

Year	Nominated work	Category	Result	Ref.
1997	Bastard out of Carolina	Outstanding Performance by a Female Actor in a Miniseries or Television Movie	Nominated	
2008	Into the Wild	Outstanding Performance by a Cast in a Motion Picture	Nominated	

== Teen Choice Awards ==
Year	Nominated work	Category	Result	Ref.
2016	The Hunger Games: Mockingjay - Part 2	Choice Movie Scene Stealer	Won	

== Young Artist Awards ==
Year	Nominated work	Category	Result	Ref.
1997	Bastard out of Carolina	Best Performance in a TV Movie, Pilot or Miniseries – Leading Young Actress	Won	
1998	Ellen Foster	Best Performance in a TV Movie, Pilot or Miniseries – Leading Young Actress	Won	
1999	Stepmom	Best Leading Young Actress in a Feature Film	Won	
2000	For Love of the Game	Best Performance in a Feature Film – Supporting Young Actress	Nominated	

== YoungStar Awards ==
Year	Nominated work	Category	Result	Ref.
1997	Bastard out of Carolina	Best Performance by a Young Actress in a Miniseries/Made-for-TV Movie	Nominated	
1998	Hope	Best Performance by a Young Actress in a Miniseries/Made-for-TV Movie	Nominated	
1999	Stepmom	Best Young Actress in a Drama Film	Won	
2000	For Love of the Game	Best Young Actress in a Drama Film	Nominated	
