= Art Nouveau Magazine =

American quarterly magazine

Art Nouveau Magazine is an American quarterly visual art and design and culture magazine. The online version, an-mag.com, launched in 2007. The magazine went defunct in 2011.

== Issues ==
Art Nouveau Magazine's first issue, which launched in January 2008, included interviews with musicians KT Tunstall, J Davey, PPT, Danny! and Farewell, visual artists Kris Lewis, Dave White, Brand Nu, actors Denzel Washington, Gabrielle Union and Morris Chestnut.

Art Nouveau's first print issue launched on June 1, 2010, with artwork by Ron English.

For their third anniversary, Art Nouveau Magazine hosted a party that included rapper Theophilus London.

Art Nouveau's second issue entitled "Bold" showed Bilal and Coco & Breezy on the cover.
