= Brian Savelson =

American screenwriter

Brian Savelson is an American writer, director, and producer who works in film, theater, and television.

Savelson has written for numerous TV series including Amazon's The New Yorker Presents, Fox's Next, and Apple's Little America for which he was nominated for The Humanitas Prize.

Savelson wrote and directed the feature film In Our Nature starring John Slattery, Jena Malone, Zach Gilford, and Gabrielle Union.

Savelson was a producer of the first-ever Broadway revival of A Raisin in the Sun, which won two Tony Awards and was noted for the especially diverse audience it brought to Broadway.

Savelson's short film Counting Water screened at over 20 film festivals, was awarded the Special Jury Prize at the Atlanta Film Festival, was aired on PBS, and exhibited at LACMA.

Savelson won an MVPA Award for his direction of the Band Of Horses music video "Is There A Ghost." Savelson directed the music video for Joss Stone's cover of The High Road which featured the singer riding an elephant through a world of melting clocks. Savelson has also directed music videos for Ra Ra Riot and The Republic Tigers.

In August 2020, it was announced Savelson would be collaborating on a new TV series with Janicza Bravo and Jake Gyllenhaal based on Ian Parker's New Yorker article, "A Suspense Novelist's Trail of Deceptions."
