= In Our Nature =

In Our Nature may refer to:

- In Our Nature (José González album), 2007
- In Our Nature (Blue Rodeo album), 2013
- In Our Nature (film), a 2012 drama film
