= 10 Cent Pistol =

- Directed by: Michael C. Martin
- Written by: Michael C. Martin
- Produced by: JT Alexander; Damon Alexander
- Starring: Jena Malone
- Cinematography: Michael Fimognari
- Edited by: Aram Nigoghossian
- Music by: Jim Dooley
- Production company: Route 17 Entertainment
- Distributed by: Phase 4 Films
- Release date: April 25, 2014 (Newport Beach Film Festival)
- Running time: 91 minutes
- Country: United States
- Language: English

10 Cent Pistol is a 2014 American crime thriller film directed by Michael C. Martin and starring Jena Malone.

== Plot ==
When a high-stakes scheme goes horribly wrong, two brothers must take on the craziest job of their criminal careers, and pray they get out alive.

== Cast ==
- Jena Malone as Danneel
- JT Alexander as Jake
- Damon Alexander as Easton
- Joe Mantegna as Punchy
- Adam Arkin as Nir Zir
- Brendan Sexton III as Donny
- Thomas Ian Nicholas as H-Wood
- Jessica Szohr as Chelsea
- Emilio Rivera as Melville
- Amir Talai as Amir

== Distribution ==
The film's producers' ran a Kickstarter campaign to facilitate distribution. The campaign was successful, beating their $10,000 target by $1,161. However, they faced criticism from the project's backers when they failed to deliver the rewards that were promised.

== Reception ==
The film has a 43% rating on Rotten Tomatoes based on seven critic reviews, with an average rating of 5/10. Clayton Dillard of Slant Magazine gave the film two stars out of four.
