= Jena Malone =

American actress (born 1984)

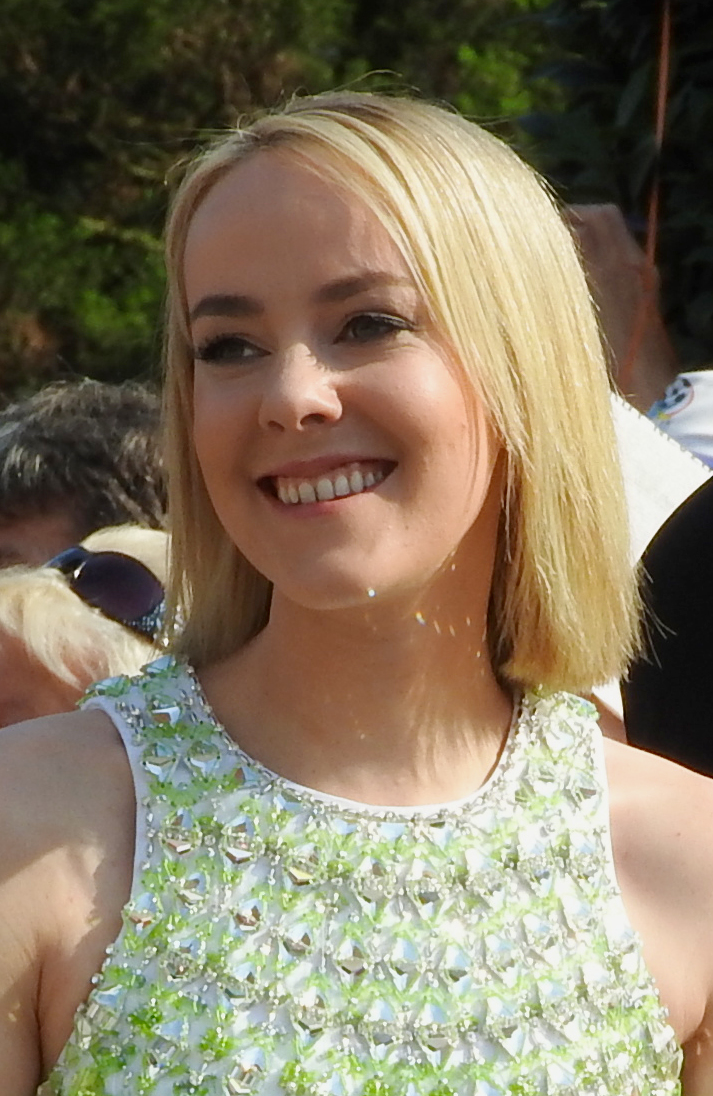
- Malone in 2015
- Born: November 21, 1984 (age 41)
- Occupations: Actress, musician
- Years active: 1995–present
- Works: Full list
- Children: 1
- Awards: Full list

Jena Malone (/ˈdʒɛnə məˈloʊn/; born November 21, 1984) is an American actress and musician. Known for her performances spanning screen and stage, her accolades include an Independent Spirit Award and a Saturn Award, in addition to nominations for a Golden Globe and two Actor Awards.

Raised in Sparks and Las Vegas, Nevada, Malone was inspired by her mother to become an actress, eventually convincing her to relocate to Los Angeles. After a series of auditions, Malone was cast in the television film Bastard Out of Carolina (1996), for which she received a nomination for the Actor Award for Outstanding Performance by a Female Actor in a Miniseries or Television Movie. Her career progressed with the television film Hope (1997), for which she was nominated for the Golden Globe Award for Best Actress, and the feature films Contact (1997) and Stepmom (1998).

Malone began the 2000s with the independent psychological thriller Donnie Darko (2001), which became a cult film. She next appeared in the drama film Life as a House and the miniseries Hitler: The Rise of Evil (both 2003), and the dark comedy film Saved! (2004), and established herself as an adult with the historical drama film Pride & Prejudice (2005). She furthered this success with the drama films The Ballad of Jack and Rose (2005) and Into the Wild (2007), and the horror film The Ruins (2008). She made her foray into action films with Zack Snyder's Sucker Punch (2011), and earned her highest-grossing releases with the role of Johanna Mason in The Hunger Games film series (2013–2015).

Malone has since appeared in the horror films The Neon Demon (2016), Antebellum (2020), Swallowed (2022) and Consecration (2023), the thriller films Nocturnal Animals (2016) and Love Lies Bleeding (2024), the drama films The Public (2018) and Lorelei (2020) which she executive produced, and the Western film Horizon: An American Saga – Chapter 1 (2024). Her continued television credits include the crime dramas Too Old to Die Young (2019) and Goliath (2021).

== Early life ==
Malone was born on November 21, 1984. Her father is of partly Norwegian descent; she also has Irish ancestry. According to Malone, her mother became pregnant with her after a one-night stand with her father, who was married to another woman at the time. Malone was raised by her mother and her mother's girlfriend. "They were lovers", Malone has said. "I had two moms, and it was awesome." She remained estranged from her father for much of her early life but reconciled with him in adulthood.

Malone grew up impoverished; her family relocated frequently and at times was homeless. "We were just so poor," Malone has said. "We'd hop out of apartments, lose jobs, find a cheaper place, get kicked out, live in cars, and live in hotels." By the time she was nine years old, she had lived in 27 locations. Despite the frequent moves, Malone said, "I don't think it was a tough childhood... It prepared me for this strange, gypsy lifestyle of an actor. It's a beautiful thing to give children diversity of where to live and how to live; it makes you believe that security is built within instead of four concrete walls that you call a home".

As a child, Malone first began taking an interest in acting while watching her mother perform in community theater in the Lake Tahoe area. In 1995, she moved to Las Vegas, where she resided with her family for nine months, and began taking acting classes while her mother worked in a call center. She subsequently persuaded her mother to move to Los Angeles so she could pursue an acting career. Malone has said that she and her mother struggled financially in Los Angeles. She was home-schooled from sixth to eighth grade and attended the Professional Children's School in New York City for ninth grade. She has one younger maternal half-sibling, Madison Mae Malone (born 1997) and three paternal half-brothers. After dropping out of high school in 1999, Malone obtained a General Educational Development certificate in 2001.

== Career ==
=== 1990s ===
Malone progressed to professional acting with the film Bastard Out of Carolina (1996). She was nominated at the 1996 Independent Spirit Awards for Best Debut Performance and at the third Screen Actors Guild Awards for Outstanding Performance by a Female Actor in a Television Movie or Miniseries for her role in the film. From there her roles grew to include several Hollywood features. In 1997, she was nominated for a Golden Globe Award in the category Best Actress in a Miniseries or Television Film for her role in the television film Hope (1997), portraying a young girl growing up in a small town in the 1960s.

After completing Hope, Malone was cast in Robert Zemeckis's science fiction film Contact (1997), playing the child counterpart of Jodie Foster's lead character. For her portrayal she won a Saturn Award for Best Performance by a Younger Actor. In 1998, she played the role of an unwed mother who is suspected of murdering her newborn baby in an episode of Homicide: Life on the Street. The following year Malone was cast opposite Susan Sarandon, Julia Roberts and Ed Harris in the drama Stepmom (1998), playing an adolescent girl whose father has remarried and whose mother is dying of terminal cancer. The film was a box office success, grossing over $150 million against a $50 million budget. Malone played Heather Aubrey, the teenage daughter of Kelly Preston in the 1999 movie, For Love of the Game, starring Kevin Costner.

=== 2000s ===
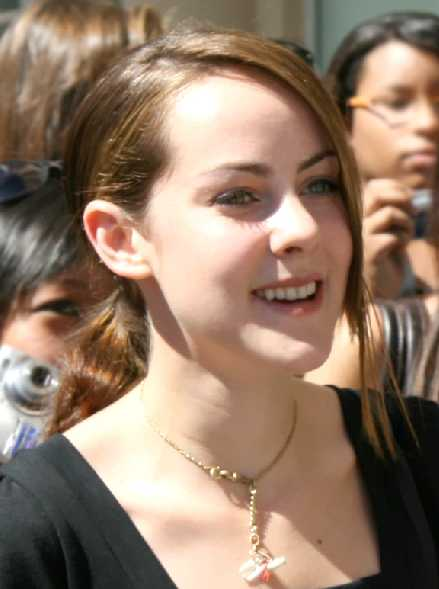
Malone at the Toronto International Film Festival in 2007

In 2000, Malone played the leading role in Cheaters, a television film which chronicles the true story of a Chicago high school team that cheated in the United States Academic Decathlon. Malone had her first cinematic leading role in the psychological science fiction thriller film Donnie Darko (2001), playing Gretchen Ross, the new girl in town who becomes the girlfriend of Jake Gyllenhaal's title character. Though the film was not a box-office hit, it later gained notoriety as a cult film. The same year she had a supporting part in the drama Life as a House (2001), portraying the girlfriend of a young man (Hayden Christensen) whose ailing father (Kevin Kline) is building a home. Malone co-produced the independent comedy-drama American Girl (2002), the first feature in which she had top billing, co-starring with Brad Renfro and Alicia Witt as a suicidal young woman whose father is in prison. In 2002 Malone played the part of a Catholic schoolgirl with a painful secret opposite Emile Hirsch in The Dangerous Lives of Altar Boys, also featuring Vincent D'Onofrio and Jodie Foster. In 2003, Jena appeared as "ferry girl" in Cold Mountain, and played Becky Pollard in the thriller The United States of Leland.

Malone had top billing in the dark comedy Saved! (2004), in which she portrayed a Christian high school student who discovers her boyfriend is gay. The same year she starred in the ecological-themed independent thriller film Corn, about a young woman who returns to her family's farm to find that their sheep are being driven mad by corn modified to be immune to pesticides. Ronnie Scheib of Variety praised her performance, writing: "With Corn Jena Malone proves conclusively that she can carry a movie."

Malone was subsequently cast as Lydia Bennet in Joe Wright's adaptation of Jane Austen's Pride and Prejudice (2005). Stephen Holden of The New York Times wrote, "Malone, as the saucy, boy-crazy youngest daughter, Lydia, offers an amusing caricature of teenage idiocy and entitlement." The same year she had a supporting role in Rebecca Miller's drama The Ballad of Jack and Rose.

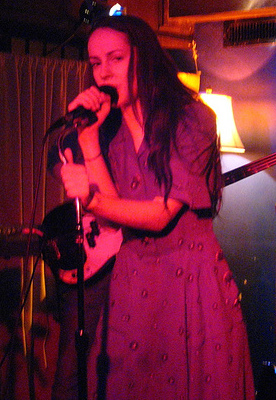
Malone performing with the Blood Stains at Union Hall in 2008

In 2006, Malone made her Broadway stage debut as Sister James in a production of the Tony Award-winning play Doubt. Ben Brantley of The New York Times wrote that Malone "slides effortlessly and appealingly into the part of the dewy, impressionable Sister James." She also appeared in films, co-starring with Chloë Sevigny in filmmaker M. Blash's improvised feature Lying (2006), playing one of several women attending a precarious weekend gathering. Malone followed this with supporting roles in the independent comedy The Go-Getter (2007), playing a young woman reunited with her middle school crush, and the biographical drama Into the Wild (2007), in which she portrayed the sister of Chris McCandless.

In 2007, it was announced that Malone was releasing her first single on The Social Registry, a New York City experimental music label, as Jena Malone and the Bloodstains. A number of tracks were subsequently posted to her MySpace page. Pitchfork Media has described Malone's music as "pretty out-there—bedroom electronics, spaced-out keyboards, and Malone's spare vocals." In 2008, she formed the musical project The Shoe, which features Malone performing with a series of electronic instruments contained within a steamer trunk. She began performing impromptu live shows on street corners in 2008.

Malone appeared in the supernatural horror film The Ruins (2008) opposite Shawn Ashmore and Jonathan Tucker, playing one of several backpackers in Mexico who become trapped on a Mayan temple teeming with vines that can animate and attack those who come into contact with them. The following year, she returned to theater, portraying Lavinia in an off-Broadway revival of Eugene O'Neill's play Mourning Becomes Electra, opposite Lili Taylor.

=== 2010s ===
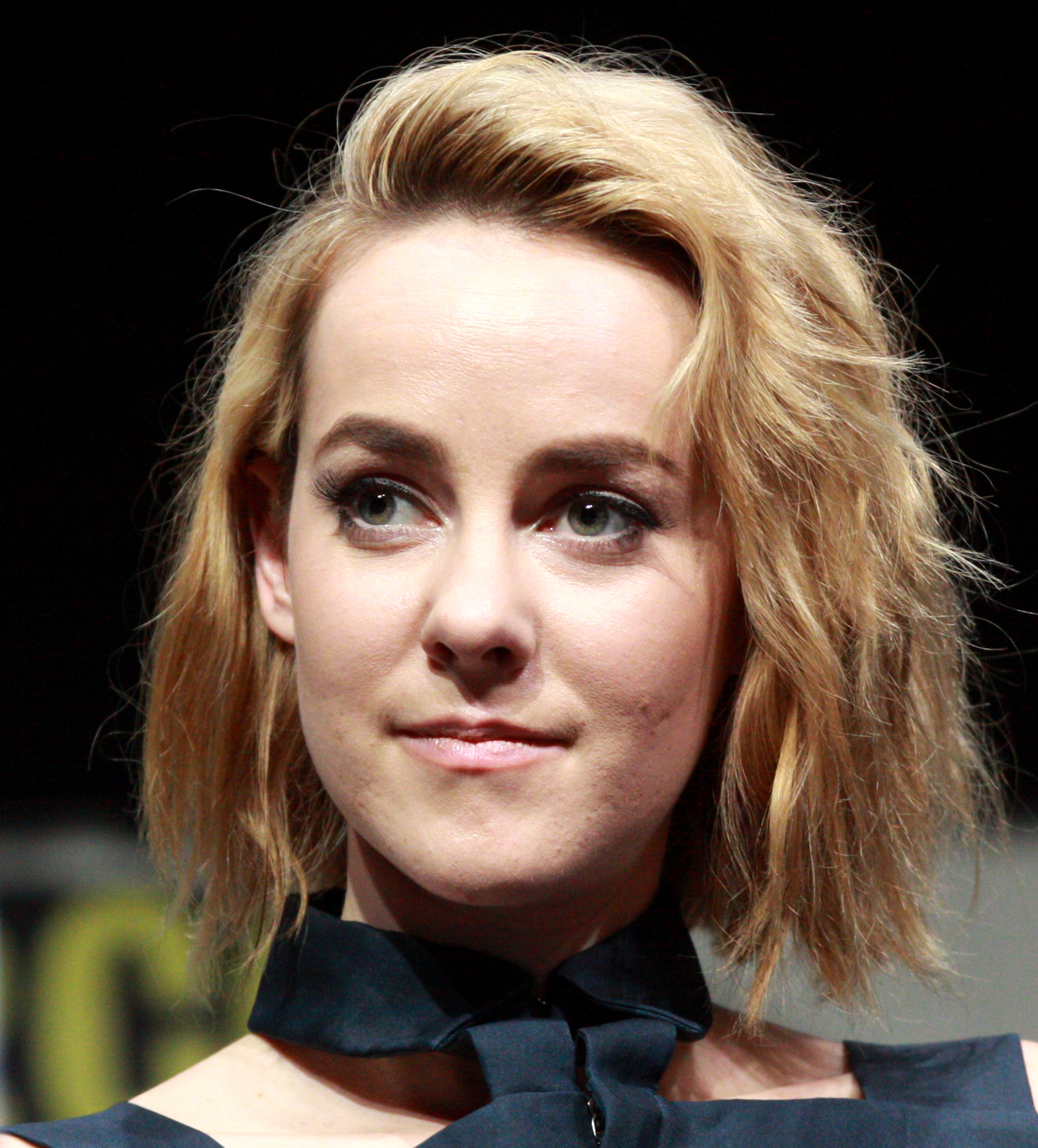
Malone at the 2013 San Diego Comic Con

In 2011, Malone played the role of Rocket in Zack Snyder's action film Sucker Punch. The film's commercial failure caused Malone to reevaluate her career and consider focusing on photography and music. After the success of her next role, in The History Channel's miniseries Hatfields and McCoys, Malone's passion for acting returned.

In 2012, Malone starred in Dakota, a series on the YouTube channel Wigs, portraying the title character. She was attached to play Carson McCullers in the film Lonely Hunter, directed by Deborah Kampmeir, and had a supporting role in Brian Savelson's independent drama In Our Nature (2012) opposite Zach Gilford, Gabrielle Union, and John Slattery, playing one of several young people on a couples' getaway.

In 2013 Malone reunited with M. Blash and co-star Chloë Sevigny in the independent drama The Wait, portraying the sister of a woman who believes their dead mother will be resurrected. The same year she was cast as Johanna Mason in The Hunger Games: Catching Fire.

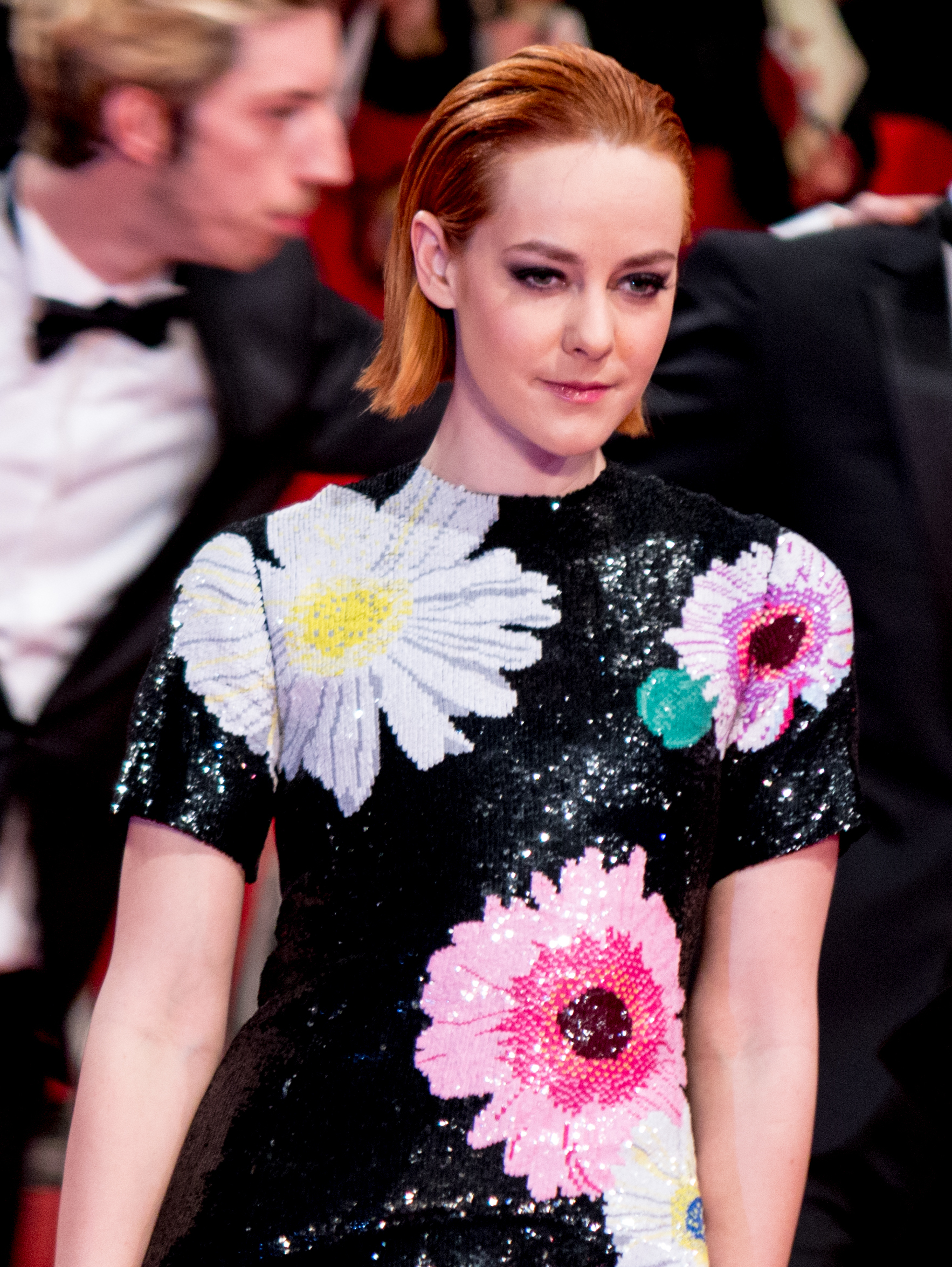
Malone in 2015

In 2014, Malone exhibited 39 photographs she had taken in Myanmar that summer. The exhibition, which ran from November 21 to 28, was called "The Holy Other." It took place at MAMA, an art gallery owned by Malone's friend Adarsha Benjamin in Downtown Los Angeles. Proceeds were donated to Girl Determined, a nonprofit organization that benefits girls' education in Myanmar. Also in 2014, Malone had a supporting role in Paul Thomas Anderson's neo-noir film Inherent Vice (2014), portraying an ex-heroin addict who hires a detective (Joaquin Phoenix) to find her husband. Malone also reprised the role of Johanna Mason in two Hunger Games sequels, Mockingjay – Part 1 (2014) and Mockingjay – Part 2 (2015).

Malone was cast as Jenet Klyburn in Batman v Superman: Dawn of Justice. Many sources reported that she was going to portray Carrie Kelley, but her scenes were left out of the theatrical release. Later, Snyder revealed that Carrie Kelley was in a deleted scene of the film, but she was not portrayed by Malone. In February 2015, Malone was cast alongside Elle Fanning in Nicolas Winding Refn's horror film The Neon Demon, which focuses on an aspiring model in Los Angeles. The film garnered criticism for a scene in which Malone engages in necrophilia. The Telegraph's Tim Robey deemed it the "most offensive film of the year" but conceded it was not "any fault of Malone's, who commits herself utterly to making it an anguished, desperate, if inevitably revolting minute or so of screen time. It's a question of context, and how this scene... slots into the film's overall thesis."

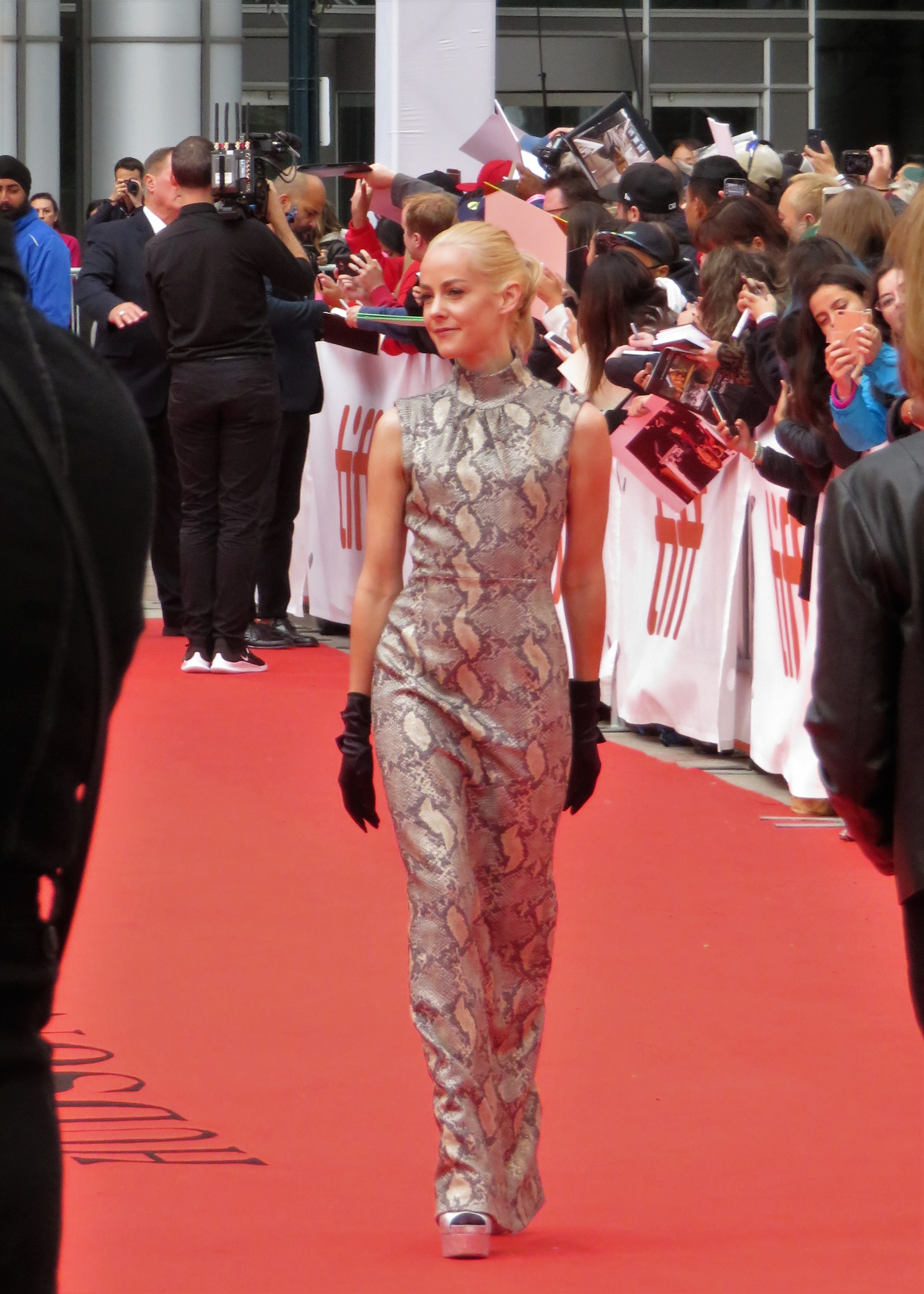
Malone at the premiere of The Public in 2018

Malone co-starred with Riley Keough in So Yong Kim's drama film Lovesong (2016), playing a young woman who falls in love with her female best friend. Kate Erbland of IndieWire wrote that "Malone is at her most effervescent and appealing" but that "the overall effect is one of a disjointed love story that can never quite find the tune, no matter how skilled its players."

Malone is credited as co-writer and featured vocalist on the Foster the People track "Static Space Lover" from the band's third album, Sacred Hearts Club, released on July 21, 2017. She appeared in the movies Stardust and The Tuna Goddess. In 2018, she appeared in the film The Public.

=== 2020s ===
In 2026, Malone appeared in the audiobook Speak Now by Ash Perez. Currently she is playing Claire, Sam's daughter, in the Netflix series The Boroughs (2026).

== Personal life ==
In 1999, at age 15, Malone filed for legal emancipation from her mother in a Los Angeles County Court, and subsequently alleged that her mother had mismanaged her earnings, spending $280,000 of her trust account. She was granted legal emancipation in January 2000.

In 2003, at age 19, Malone purchased a home in Lake Tahoe, Nevada, where she resided as of 2012.

From 2014 to 2019, Malone was in a relationship with photographer Ethan DeLorenzo, to whom she was engaged from 2016 until their separation. Their son was born in May 2016. Malone dealt with postpartum depression following the birth.

In 2019, she and musician Alex Ebert began a relationship, which was reported to have apparently ended by 2023. In 2026, Malone became engaged to actor Jack Buckley.

Malone endorsed Senator Bernie Sanders in the 2016 United States presidential election.

In 2022, Malone helped rescue a dog that was being abused by its owner, and donated to a GoFundMe campaign to cover the costs of the dog’s surgery.

In August 2022, Malone publicly came out as pansexual and polyamorous.

In March 2023, Malone disclosed having been sexually assaulted while working on The Hunger Games franchise; Malone shared a photo to Instagram that she took after filming wrapped on the series' fourth and final film, The Hunger Games: Mockingjay – Part 2. In the comments section, Malone explained she had chosen not to name her alleged assailant because of concern about "cancel-like culture".
