= Zach Gilford =

American actor

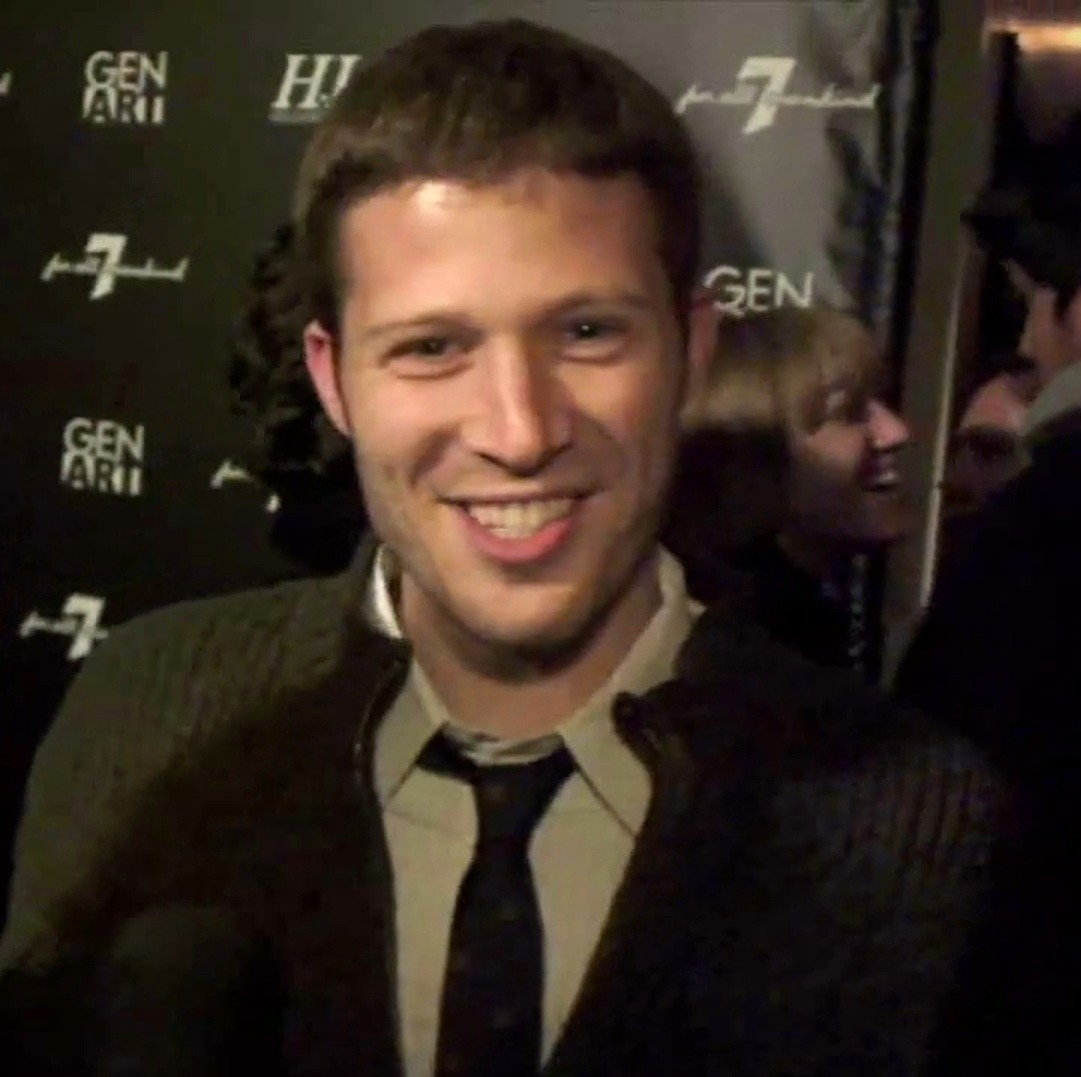
- Gilford in 2009
- Born: Zachary Michael Gilford; January 14, 1982 (age 44)
- Education: Northwestern University (BA)
- Occupation: Actor
- Years active: 2003–present
- Spouse: Kiele Sanchez (m. 2012; sep. 2025)
- Children: Two

Zachary Michael Gilford (born January 14, 1982) is an American actor best known for his role as Matt Saracen on the NBC sports drama series Friday Night Lights. In 2021, he starred in the Netflix horror limited series Midnight Mass. In 2022, he appeared in the horror mystery-thriller series The Midnight Club, and in 2023, he had a main role in the horror drama miniseries The Fall of the House of Usher.

== Early life and education ==
Gilford is the son of Anne and Steve Gilford. His mother is Lutheran, and his father is Jewish. A native of Evanston, Illinois, he graduated from Evanston Township High School and Northwestern University. He worked as a trip leader for Adventures Cross-Country and has led wilderness and adventure trips for teenagers to Alaska, British Columbia, California, Hawaii, and the South Pacific. Gilford also worked as a staff member for YMCA Camp Echo in Fremont, Michigan.

== Career ==
In 2005, he appeared in an episode of Law & Order: Special Victims Unit. In 2006, Gilford landed a regular role in Friday Night Lights: the part of Matt Saracen in the main cast, from Season 1 through Season 3. In 2009, Gilford was switched to the recurring cast in Seasons 4 and 5. That year, he also made his feature film debut, co-starring in The Last Winter (2006). He had a cameo in the film Rise: Blood Hunter and guest starred in an episode of Grey's Anatomy.

In 2009, he co-starred as Adam Davies in the romantic comedy Post Grad opposite Alexis Bledel. He also starred as Johnny Drake in the romantic drama Dare opposite Emmy Rossum. In 2010, he starred as Gus in the indie drama film The River Why alongside Amber Heard. He had a cameo in the movie Super.

In 2010, he joined the cast of ABC's medical drama Off The Map which premiered in January 2011 but was cancelled after 13 episodes. In 2011, he appeared as Taylor Swift's love interest in her music video Ours". He played the role of Evan in the drama film Answers to Nothing. In 2012, he starred as Seth in the indie drama film In Our Nature alongside Jena Malone.

In 2012, he was cast in another medical drama, The Mob Doctor, on Fox, opposite Jordana Spiro; this was also cancelled after 13 episodes. In January 2013, he appeared with Arnold Schwarzenegger in The Last Stand. He played the role of Matthew Iris in the film Crazy Kind of Love.

He co-starred alongside Allison Miller in the horror film Devil's Due (2014), set in New Orleans and the Dominican Republic, released on January 17, 2014. He also co-starred in the film sequel The Purge: Anarchy, released on July 18, 2014. He guest starred in shows such as Drunk History, Tim and Eric's Bedtime Stories and Kingdom. In 2016, he starred as Danny Warren in the ABC drama series The Family. In 2017, Gilford starred as Conner Hooks in the YouTube Red futuristic web series Lifeline.

In 2018, Gilford was cast in the recurring role of Gregg in the NBC series Good Girls. In 2019, he was cast as Ben Walker in the Bad Boys spinoff drama L.A.'s Finest. Zach also held a leading role in Midnight Mass released in 2021. In 2022, Gilford was cast in the recurring role of Elias Voit, a series unsub in Criminal Minds: Evolution. His then real life spouse Kiele Sanchez joined the series as his wife Sydney Voit.

By January 2026, he was cast in the horror film Evil Dead Wrath from director Francis Galluppi.

== Personal life ==
In the spring of 2010, Gilford began dating actress Kiele Sanchez, whom he met on the set of the television pilot for the TV movie Matadors. The couple became engaged in November 2011, and married on December 29, 2012. The couple also co-starred in The Purge: Anarchy and Criminal Minds. In August 2015, Sanchez announced that she and Gilford were expecting a son in November. In October 2015, they announced that Sanchez had suffered a late-term miscarriage. The couple have one daughter, born in November 2017 through surrogacy, and a son born in June 2021. Gilford filed for divorce from his wife on April 19, 2025.

== Filmography ==
=== Film ===
Year	Title	Role	Notes
2003	Handbook to Casual Stalking	Jimmy	Short film
2006	The Last Winter	Maxwell McKinder	Nominated – Gotham Independent Film Award for Best Ensemble Cast
2007	Rise: Blood Hunter	Sailor	
2009	Dare	Johnny Drake	
2009	Post Grad	Adam Davies	
2010	The River Why	Gus Orviston	
2010	Super	Jerry	
2011	Answers to Nothing	Evan	
2012	In Our Nature	Seth	
2013	The Last Stand	Deputy Jerry Bailey	
2013	Crazy Kind of Love	Matthew	
2014	Devil's Due	Zach McCall	
2014	The Purge: Anarchy	Shane	Nominated – MTV Movie Award for Best Scared-As-Shit Performance
2019	Boy Genius	Gordon	
2023	There's Something Wrong with the Children	Ben	
2028	Evil Dead Wrath	TBA	Post-production
TBA	A.I. Heart U	Hayden	

=== Television ===
Year	Title	Role	Notes
2005	Law & Order: Special Victims Unit	Kevin Wilcox	Episode: "Contagious"
2006–2011	Friday Night Lights	Matt Saracen	Main role; 62 episodes
2009	Grey's Anatomy	Charlie Lowell	Episode: "Here's to Future Days"
2011	Off the Map	Dr. Tommy Fuller	Main role; 13 episodes
2012–2013	The Mob Doctor	Dr. Brett Robinson	Main role; 13 episodes
2014–2019	Drunk History	Jim Abbott / Roger Sharpe / Ed Pulaski	3 episodes
2015	Tim & Eric's Bedtime Stories	Matt Peters	Episode: "Tornado"
2016	The Family	Daniel "Danny" Warren	Main role; 12 episodes
2017	Kingdom	Tim	Recurring role, 2 episodes
2017	Lifeline	Conner Hooks	Main role; 8 episodes
2018–2019	This Close	Danny	Recurring role, 8 episodes
2018–2021	Good Girls	Gregg	Recurring role, 11 episodes
2019–2020	L.A.'s Finest	Ben Walker	Main role; 26 episodes
2019	Law & Order: Special Victims Unit	James Miller	Episode: "The Burden of Our Choices"
2021	Midnight Mass	Riley Flynn	Main role; 7 episodes
2022	The Midnight Club	Mark	Main role; 10 episodes
2022–present	Criminal Minds: Evolution	Elias Voit	Recurring role (season 16), Main role (season 17, season 18, season 19)
2023	The Fall of the House of Usher	Young Roderick Usher	Main role; 8 episodes

=== Music videos ===
Year	Artist	Song	Notes
2011	Taylor Swift	"Ours"	Taylor Swift's love interest
