= American Girl (2002 film) =

- DVD cover
- Directed by: Jordan Brady
- Written by: Scott Sandoe
- Produced by: Jena Malone; Stavros Merjos; Yoram Pelman; Adam Rosenfelt; Chad Snopek; Sheila Wurmser
- Starring: Jena Malone; Brad Renfro; Chris Mulkey; Michelle Forbes; Alicia Witt; Clifton Collins, Jr.
- Cinematography: David Hennings
- Edited by: Shawna Callahan
- Music by: Amotz Plessner
- Distributed by: Metro-Goldwyn-Mayer
- Release date: October 16, 2002
- Running time: 88 minutes
- Country: United States
- Language: English

American Girl is a 2002 American comedy-drama film directed by Jordan Brady and starring Jena Malone, who also serves as a co-producer. Co-starring are Brad Renfro, Chris Mulkey, Michelle Forbes, Alicia Witt, and Clifton Collins, Jr. The film follows a pregnant, naive teenager who convinces her family to visit their father in prison at its annual family picnic, only for him to not be what she had idealized.

The film premiered on October 14, 2002, at the Austin Film Festival. It was later released to DVD on January 11, 2005, under the title Confessions of an American Girl.

== Plot ==
Rena is a suicidal and naive teenage girl whose father John is serving a long prison sentence. She has an idealistic view of her father. Her boyfriend, the popular Kenton, only uses her for sex, and other teenage girls tease her relentlessly. She eventually becomes pregnant with Kenton's baby, which she is excited to keep.

Rena and her family - mother Madge, half-sister Barbie, and brother Jay - travel to John's prison for the annual family picnic at Rena's insistence despite her family's discomfort. Things seem to be going just fine, but he eventually becomes abusive and angry. Rena tells her dad that she's pregnant, news which John does not handle well. Jay, who is secretly gay, wanders off to tour the prison with another inmate named Buddy. Barbie, who has been secretly visiting the prison regularly and has been having an affair with her stepfather, sneaks off to the conjugal visit trailers to have sex with John. After she is caught by Buddy and Jay, the other inmates watch as Buddy makes Barbie squeal like a pig in exchange for not reporting her to her mother. Rena bonds with Faye, an institutionalized woman who is also overcoming her anxiety and suicidal tendencies. Jay and Buddy bond, and when the tour is over Buddy gives Jay a haircut.

Madge later discovers from the family's overseeing officer, Deputy Richard, that her husband is having an affair. As Madge attacks John, Jay and Buddy secretly kiss passionately before Buddy returns to his cell. When the guards apprehend John, he stumbles backwards and falls on Rena. Rena rushes to the bathroom, finding that she's bled, and lost the baby. She breaks a picture frame and uses the glass shards to slit her wrists, but Jay saves her just in time.

Madge and the children realize that John will not change his abusive ways and that continuing to support him has been holding the family back. Madge announces that she is moving the family to Florida in Disney World, and Rena finally stands up to her father. John is relieved that she is no longer pregnant, leading Rena to pounce on him in anger. After being snapped into reality by her siblings, Rena realizes that her "fond" memories of her relationship with her father were self-delusions.

Rena tells Kenton about the miscarriage of their baby and when he expresses indifference, she breaks up with him and causes his prized car to drive into a swimming pool. Rena cuts ties with her father, Barbie finds a job as a manicurist, while Jay is accepted to culinary school in California. As Rena, Madge, and Jay leave home for Florida, Rena remarks that the only thing she remembers about the picnic is leaving.

== Cast ==
- Jena Malone as Rena Grubb
- Brad Renfro as Jay Grubb
- Chris Mulkey as John Grubb
- Michelle Forbes as Madge Grubb
- Alicia Witt as Barbie
- Clifton Collins Jr. as Buddy
- Kevin Gage as Deputy Richard
- Micole Mercurio as Faye
- Erik von Detten as Kenton

== Critical reception ==
American Girl received mixed to negative reviews from critics. Jeff Paramchuk from DVD Talk website gave it three out of five stars and wrote that "there really is nothing wrong with this movie, but I can see how that it would not appeal to a very large group especially given its plot", he also says that "Confessions is a decent alternative from a lot of the teen movies that we see out in recent times, but not quite on par with films that get general release". David Nusair from Reel Film Reviews gave it one and a half out of four stars and wrote that the screenplay "emphasizing tired jokes over character development" and as a result "the film feels more like an extended sitcom pilot than anything else" and conclude that "unless your idea of a good time is watching an episode of Cops, it's highly unlikely you'll find much here to embrace."
