= Kris Lewis =

American artist (born 1978)

Kris Lewis (born 1978) is an American contemporary realist artist from Jackson Township, New Jersey. His primary medium is oil paints. In September of 2026, Lewis was named the Grand Prize Winner of the international Beautiful Bizarre Art Prize for his oil painting, Sprung.[1].

== Early life ==
Lewis grew up along the Jersey Shore. He studied illustration at University of the Arts (Philadelphia), Pennsylvania. Many of his paintings show deep understanding of traditional portraiture painting. Mark Tocchet, Paul King, Tim O’Brien, and Brian Biggs were some of his instructors.

== Work ==
Although Lewis is a contemporary portrait painter. Lewis is a twin. He often refers to his close family ties and Latvian heritage as an inspirations to his works. His work often depicts strong women. He is influenced by Hans Holbein, Albrecht Dürer, Hieronymus Bosch and Gustav Klimt.

Kris Lewis work has been published in Juxtapoz and Modern Painters. He has been featured in Art Nouveau Magazine, several covers of American Art Collector magaine , Symposium Magazine, Books: Two Faced: The Changing Face of Portraiture, and Suggetivism. His painting was featured on the cover of the May 2011 issue of American Art Collector. He was featured in an interview and showcase in the July 2011 issue of Hi-Fructose Magazine. His work has been shown in galleries, including Jonathan LeVine Gallery, David B. Smith Gallery, Corey Helford Gallery and others. His work has been shown all over the world, including across United States: Los Angeles, San Francisco, Seattle, New York City, Denver, Miami, London, Rome, as well as in Hong Kong, Rome, Tokyo, Seoul, London, Berlin.

Lucky Brand Jeans selected him for their "Lucky Few" campaign which exposed young and upcoming talents in various fields. He was featured in a print campaign that featured ads in several major magazines, such as Details, Vogue and GQ, and on billboards across the America.

Kris Lewis has co-curated Grammy art exhibitions such as "Worlds on Fire" on February 2, 2009, with singer/producer will.i.am, held at the Grammy Museum in Los Angeles. He has created album cover art for will.i.am.

His work is sometimes also associated with the pop surrealism movement.

== Awards ==
2026: Grand Prize Winner, International Beautiful Bizarre Art Prize, for the painting Sprung.[1]

== Selected exhibitions ==
- 2017 Sensory Overload, Corey Helford Gallery, US, Los Angeles
- 2015 The Lost Mitten Society, Jonathan LeVine Gallery, US, Jersey City
- 2012 – Solo exhibition – Kris Lewis, David B. Smith Gallery, US, Denver
- 2012 Resolve, Joshua Liner Gallery, US, New York
- 2011 – Solo exhibition – Kris Lewis, David B. Smith Gallery, US, Denver
- 2010 Group Exhibition, Part 2, David B. Smith Gallery, US, Denver
- 2010 – Solo exhibition – Kris Lewis: New Portraits, Arden Gallery, US, Newbury Street
- 2009 Look for us at the Grammys, The Shooting Gallery, US, San Francisco

== Bibliography ==
- Suggestivism: A Comprehensive Survey of Contemporary Artists (Hardcover, Gingko Press; First edition; June 5, 2011) ISBN 1584234474
- Two Faced: The Changing Face of Portraiture (Systems Design Ltd; April 1, 2007) ISBN 9889899256

== Citations ==
"Grand Prize Winner, Beautiful Bizarre Art Prize 2026". Beautiful Bizarre Art Prize. September 22, 2026. Retrieved September 29, 2026.
