= Corn (film) =

- DVD cover
- Directed by: Dave Silver
- Starring: Jena Malone
- Release date: October 2004 (Hamptons International Film Festival)
- Running time: 97 minutes
- Country: United States
- Language: English

Corn is a 2004 drama-thriller starring Jena Malone about the dangers of genetically modified food.

== Plot ==
Emily Rasmussen (Malone) drops out of college upon realizing that she is pregnant, and reluctantly returns to her stepfather's (Don Harvey) sheep ranch to get her life together. She plans on keeping the baby, even though the father of the child, a politician, refuses to help her for fear of a scandal. Emily's mother died when she was young, and she has a very awkward relationship with her father.

Upon her arrival, Emily notices that her father's sheep are acting rather strangely; they appear to be viciously fighting over a weed that is the byproduct of their neighbor's corn. That neighbor began growing corn when provided with a newly generated seed that was meant to be immune to all pesticides. The corn was altered genetically so it could grow with very little water so it could be used in otherwise barren places, such as parts of Africa, to feed starving people.

After witnessing a lamb being born with only two legs, Emily decides to investigate this corn and its weed byproduct, and learns that it is an experiment in genetic engineering. After hearing about the death of the newborn baby of a friend who regularly ate lamb, Emily realizes she has to do something to put a stop to this. Her efforts will entail standing up to the big corporation that is testing the corn, her employers, and ultimately, her father.
