= Gabrielle Union =

American actress (born 1972)

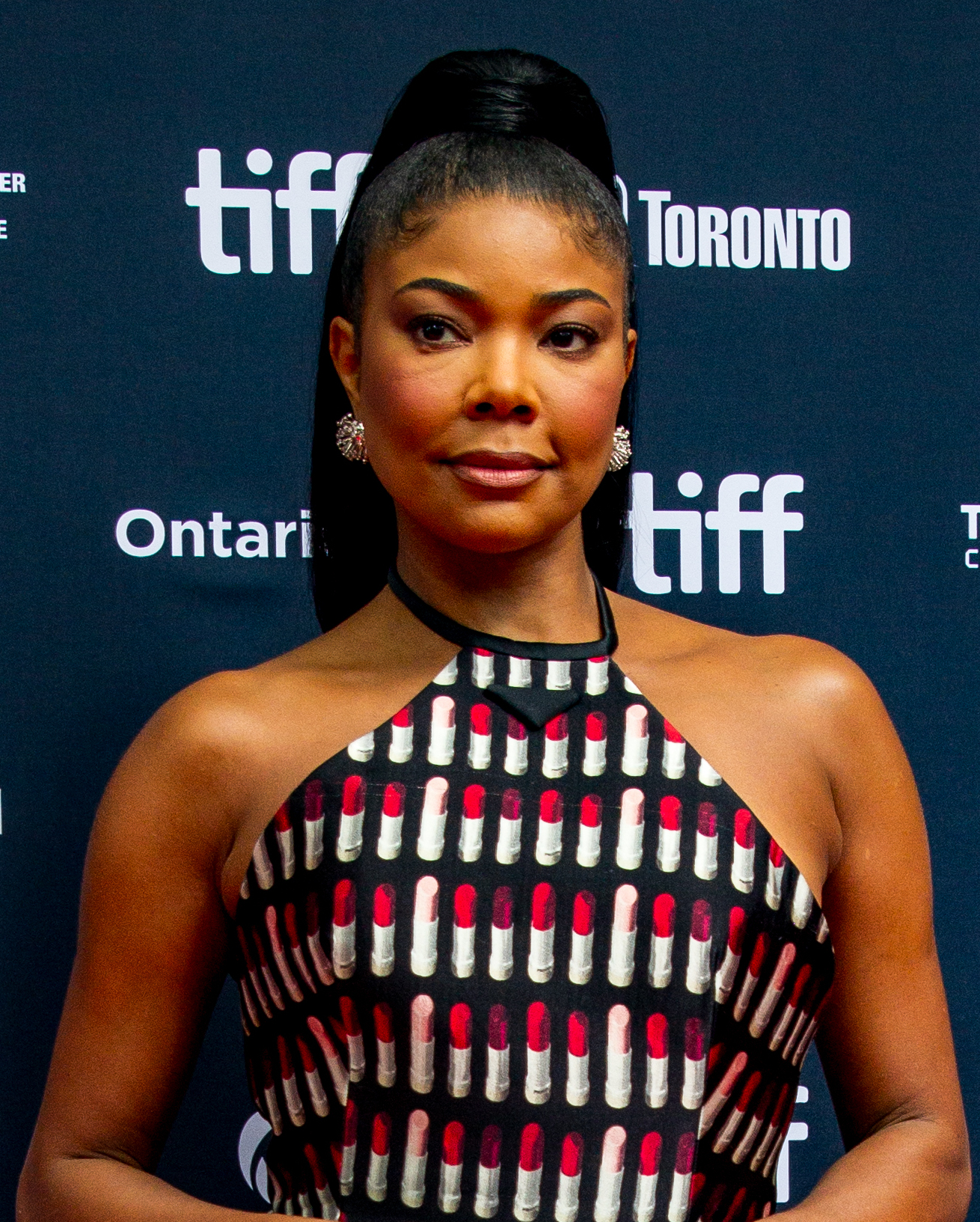
- Union in 2024
- Born: Gabrielle Monique Union; October 29, 1972 (age 54); Omaha, Nebraska, U.S.
- Education: University of California, Los Angeles (BS)
- Occupations: Actress; author
- Years active: 1992–present
- Height: 5 ft 7 1/2 in (1.71 m)
- Spouses: Chris Howard (m. 2001; div. 2006) Dwyane Wade (m. 2014)
- Children: 1
- Relatives: Saweetie (cousin once removed); Zaire Wade (Stepson); Zaya Wade (Stepdaughter)

Gabrielle Monique Union-Wade (née Union; born October 29, 1972) is an American actress, model and author. Her career began in the 1990s, when she made dozens of appearances on television sitcoms before landing supporting roles in 1999 teen films She's All That and 10 Things I Hate About You. Her breakthrough role arrived the following year in the teen film Bring It On.

Union is known for her performances in the romantic comedy films The Brothers (2001), Deliver Us from Eva (2003), Daddy's Little Girls (2007), Think Like a Man (2012) and Think Like a Man Too (2014). She also had starring roles in the CBS medical drama series City of Angels (2000) and in the films Bad Boys II (2003), Cradle 2 the Grave (2003), Neo Ned (2005), Cadillac Records (2008), Top Five (2014), Breaking In (2018), and The Perfect Find (2023). She has also co-starred in the films The Birth of a Nation (2016), Almost Christmas (2016) and Sleepless (2017).

Union starred as the lead characters in BET drama series Being Mary Jane (2013–2019), for which she has received an NAACP Image Award, and in the crime series L.A.'s Finest (2019–2020). Outside of acting, Union has written four books: two memoirs, titled We're Going to Need More Wine (2017) and You Got Anything Stronger? (2021), and two children's books, titled Welcome to the Party (2020) and Shady Baby (2021).

At the age of 19, Union was attacked and raped at gunpoint. She has been an outspoken advocate for issues involving women's health, LGBTQ+ equality, and violence against women, and was awarded the President's Award from the NAACP Image Awards, alongside her husband Dwyane Wade for their humanitarian efforts. Union was included on Time's list of the 100 most influential people in the world in 2020.

== Early life ==
Union was born on October 29, 1972, in Omaha, Nebraska, the daughter of Theresa (née Glass), a phone company manager and social worker, and Sylvester E. Union, a military sergeant. She was raised Catholic. During her childhood, she was taught to be "an independent woman, standing on my own two feet, and that's the road I opted to take." According to Union, her mother taught her to have a "world perspective" and took her to a gay pride parade at the age of eight after the family moved to Pleasanton, California. She attended Foothill High School where she was a year-round student athlete, competing in varsity soccer, track, and basketball. In her junior year, Union dated Jason Kidd, who was attending St. Joseph Notre Dame High School in nearby Alameda.

Union's parents divorced after 30 years of marriage. She said, "They handled their divorce and our subsequent transition into a blended family with grace, dignity and respect. They always put us first and didn't involve us. I'm lucky that I can just mirror what my parents did and always put the kids first. They're pretty awesome. I'm lucky."

Union grew up with self-esteem issues relating to racism, as one of the few African-American children in her environment. When Union was younger, she believed that "blonde was the ideal of beauty, and if I looked nothing like that, then I must be ugly." On her college football memories, Union reflected, "In my family if you couldn't talk Cornhusker football—that means knowing the Blackshirt defense, knowing the I-back formation—then you don't get to have an opinion. When I first toured the Nebraska campus and I saw Turner Gill walk, I freaked out. That was like the biggest star-struck moment I've probably ever had in my life. But it's because I grew up in a household that always talked specifically Cornhusker football and Big 8 sports at the time."

During the summer before starting her sophomore year of college at UCLA, at the age of 19, Union was attacked and raped at gunpoint at her part-time job at a Payless shoe store by a robber. Union has said she would not have survived the attack had it not been for self-defense lessons from Oprah Winfrey's talk show. She successfully sued Payless for negligence, alleging that the store failed to warn employees about the assailant, who had previously been identified robbing another Payless location.

Union has a bachelor's degree in sociology from UCLA.

== Career ==
=== Early roles ===
Union started her acting career with minor roles. Her first audition was for Saved by the Bell. In 1997, Union appeared in the sixth-season episode of Star Trek: Deep Space Nine—"Sons and Daughters" as the Klingon N'Garen. She also appeared in Moesha as Ashli, Sister, Sister as Vanessa, in Smart Guy as Denise, and in five episodes of 7th Heaven as Keesha Hamilton. She also appeared on an episode of Friends, "The One with the Cheap Wedding Dress", as Kristen, a love interest to both Ross and Joey. Other earlier roles included teen movies such as She's All That and 10 Things I Hate About You.

=== 2000–2009 ===
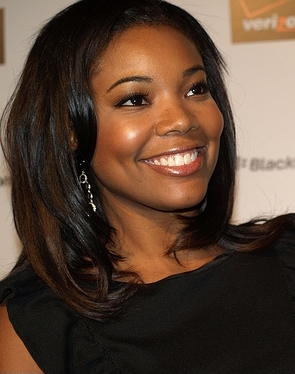
Union in February 2009

Union appeared in the 2000 film Love & Basketball. She then played the role of Isis in the cheerleading movie Bring It On, which helped push Union into the mainstream. Bring It On led to Union being cast in the CBS television drama City of Angels as Dr. Courtney Ellis. In 2001, Union was featured in The Brothers and was seen as having a "beguiling sincerity, even when she's fudging the truth." Union was cast in her first leading role in the 2003 film Deliver Us from Eva. When casting Eva, director Gary Hardwick was looking for an actress capable of instantly changing "from funny to caustic and dramatic." Hardwick had previously worked with Union in The Brothers and believed she was perfect for the role of Eva. Union's role in the film was met with praise, with Dustin Putman of All-Reviews.com writing that she was "the star attraction, and the number-one reason to even consider seeing the film." Union drew influence from her father for the "stern" look she had in the film, admitting that she had stolen it from him.

In 2003, Union landed the role of the main character Mike Lowrey's girlfriend, Syd, in the film Bad Boys II, a box-office success grossing more than $273 million worldwide. Union felt that she had been "blessed" with her role in the film, feeling it elevated her career. That same year, she lent her voice to the animated television series The Proud Family. The following year, she appeared in Something the Lord Made. Union also starred in the 2004 film Breakin' All the Rules, which was unpopular with critics. She appeared in the 2005 film Neo Ned, portraying an African-American woman with delusions that she is Adolf Hitler. She and co-star Jeremy Renner were noted by Mark Olsen of the Los Angeles Times as having "a strange, offbeat chemistry that drives the film". She won an award for Best Actress in Neo Ned at the Palm Beach International Film Festival, and the film received awards at several festivals.

She starred in the 2005 remake of The Honeymooners. That year, Union also starred in the short-lived ABC series Night Stalker. She called the series a "reworking" rather than a remake. Union admitted that at the time of getting the script she was turned off, but she became interested after reading the script at her agent's insistence. She then met with series creator Frank Spotnitz and executive producer Daniel Sackheim, who told her they thought of her anytime they thought of the character. In 2006, she starred in the music video for Busta Rhymes' "I Love My Bitch".

Union starred in the 2007 film Daddy's Little Girls by Tyler Perry. The role of Julia Rossmore, a romantically challenged attorney, was written with her in mind. Before working with Perry, she went to see his stage show to both understand him and his audience. She filmed Daddy's Little Girls in mid-2006 in Atlanta, Georgia. Union was praised for her character's portrayal and for having a "great sense of comedic timing". Union's character also drew comparisons to Eva, her role in Deliver Us from Eva. According to Union, Perry had specifically approached her over not turning the role into the same character. Union starred with Morris Chestnut in the 2007 Christmas film The Perfect Holiday. Since she had no children of her own, Union drew on her familiarity with her mother and sister to portray the divorced single mother of three in the film. Union initially turned down the role, as she did not want to get typecast for playing a mother until she was told of other actresses that had played similar roles and still found success in their careers.

In an interview with Art Nouveau Magazine, Union complained about the lack of roles for Black actresses and actors in Hollywood: "There used to be [roles] specifically written black, if you knew Denzel was doing a movie you knew his wife, girl or love interest was going to be black [but] that's not necessarily the case anymore. You're in that room with every amazingly talented actress of every hue, and it's a dogfight, it's hard."

In 2008, Union appeared on Ugly Betty for three episodes as Renee, Wilhelmina Slater's sister and Daniel Meade's love interest. She also made a cameo appearance in the music video for Ne-Yo's "Miss Independent". Union appeared in the 2008 film Cadillac Records. She portrayed Geneva Wade, who later married Muddy Waters. Union, who was reported to have signed on to the film in March 2008, was seen as a "pleasant surprise" in the film, and her performance was said to have shown she had larger acting range than her previous roles. Union later called taking the role of Geneva Wade in the film the best business decision she had ever made. Union appeared in the 2008 film Meet Dave, playing the love interest of the title character. Union said the film was a gift. That same year, she wrote the foreword for Hill Harper's Letters to a Young Sister: DeFINE your Destiny. Union joined the cast of the American television series Life on NBC and appeared in four episodes prior to its cancellation in May 2009. She appeared in the ABC series FlashForward, a role for which she was nominated for an NAACP Image Award for Outstanding Supporting Actress in a Drama Series in 2010.

=== 2010s ===
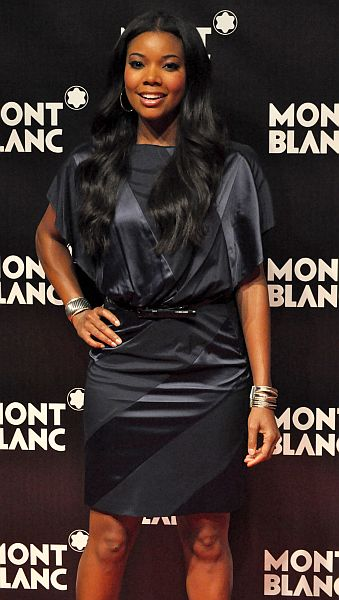
Union in September 2010

After she was reported to be joining the cast in June 2010, Union appeared in episodes of Army Wives and NTSF:SD:SUV:: in 2010 and 2011. Union was reported in May 2011 to have landed roles in Think Like a Man, a romantic comedy based on Steve Harvey's book Act Like a Lady, Think Like a Man, and an indie film, Family Tree. In June 2011, Union defended the music video for the Rihanna single "Man Down" after it sparked controversy for its depiction of a rape victim shooting and killing her attacker. Union related that every rape victim was "unique", which extended to how they believed justice should be carried out.

In January 2012, Union was announced to be a participant in Bounce TV's documentary Our History. In 2012, she played Natalie in the romantic comedy Good Deeds, playing the fiancée of the Wesley Deeds character. Union said that after she read the script, she became interested in working with Tyler Perry again and enjoyed working with the cast. She then appeared in Steve Harvey's film Think Like a Man. Union related to her character for having married and divorced young. She and Meagan Good were seen as having taken advantage of their "straightforward characters to add spots of comic zest as well." Her next appearance was In Our Nature. The film was the directorial debut of Brian Savelson. Savelson had offered Union the role two years prior to the film's release in 2010. Union saw In Our Nature as a personal victory for her career.

In 2013, she began starring in the BET network show Being Mary Jane. Union learned of the series while auditioning for Scandal for the role of Olivia Pope, which ultimately went to Kerry Washington. Union has said that she is content with having lost the role in Scandal to Washington: "I didn't get Scandal, but I got something better, which is my own show." Union was impressed with the show's quality and professionalism. Also in 2013, Union starred in Ava DuVernay's short film The Door as part of Miu Miu's Women's Tales campaign.

Union reprised her role as Kristen in Think Like a Man Too in 2014, but it received mostly negative reviews. She believed the film would do well and faced comparisons to her character, who was a newlywed while Union was engaged at the time, a similarity she dispelled by insisting she kept her relationship "enjoyable, fresh and exciting". Union was announced in July 2014 as a producer in the Lifetime film With This Ring. She was featured in Chris Rock's Top Five, playing the fiancée of Rock's character. Union viewed her Top Five character as being similar to members of the Kardashian family or the Braxton sisters. In November 2015, Union began voicing Nala in the Disney movie and series The Lion Guard. In October 2016, Union was featured in The Birth of a Nation as Esther, a slave in the Antebellum South who is raped by a white man. Union stated in an op-ed for the Los Angeles Times that she took the role due to her relating to it as a rape victim herself. Later that year, Union had a prominent role as Rachel Meyers in the comedy film Almost Christmas, released in November. Ariel Scotti of The New York Times panned Union's performance: "Each overused phrase that falls out of her character, Rachel's, vindictive, childish mouth takes viewers further out of the movie experience."

In 2017, Union launched Flawless by Gabrielle Union, a line of hair-care products that catered to people with textured hair. In September 2017, Union announced a collaborative partnership with Invicta Watch Group that included a line of watches she designed. In 2018, she starred in the action thriller film Breaking In.

In 2019, Union began starring as Syd Burnett in the Bad Boys spin-off L.A.'s Finest, a Charter Spectrum original series that premiered May 13 and was later renewed for a second season. Union was also a judge for the fourteenth season of America's Got Talent. In November 2019, the show failed to renew her contract for another season, allegedly because she spoke out against racism. Union's fellow America's Got Talent judge Julianne Hough's contract was also not renewed. In May 2020, Union filed a discrimination suit against the producers of America's Got Talent, citing racism and prejudice.

=== 2020s ===
On Disney Investor Day, December 11, 2020, it was announced that Union would be starring with Zach Braff in a remake of Cheaper by the Dozen, which was released under the same title in March 2022. In December 2021, she played Tootie Ramsey in The Facts of Life segment of the third edition of Live in Front of a Studio Audience, recreating the episode "Kids Can Be Cruel".

In March 2022, she was cast as the lead for the third season of Truth Be Told on Apple TV+.

She returned to The Proud Family on its sequel series The Proud Family: Louder and Prouder in a second-season episode airing in early 2023.

=== Books ===
In April 2017, Union announced her first book, a memoir titled We're Going to Need More Wine. The book "feature[s] personal stories and reflections on a range of topics that continue to define the contemporary landscape: sexuality, womanhood, friendship, race, marriage, and beauty." Union described the book as "the good, the bad, and the WTF." Released on October 17, 2017, the book was published by Dey Street Books, an imprint of HarperCollins. In December 2017, it was named a "Best Book of the Year by a Black Author" by The Root magazine.

In May 2020, Union released her first children's book, Welcome to the Party, an ode to newborns and non-traditional families that was inspired by her daughter. She collaborated with her husband Dwyane Wade on a second children's book, Shady Baby, published on May 18, 2021. She released a second memoir, You Got Anything Stronger?: Stories on September 14, 2021.

== Other commercial projects ==
Union became a spokeswoman for Neutrogena in 2004. In 2010, she launched Love & Blessings, a clothing line for plus-sized women, which was inspired by her full-figured sister. In March 2014, Union released her first wine, Vanilla Puddin'. That November, she became the first celebrity ambassador and creative advisor for the nail polish company SensatioNail.

In 2020, Union relaunched her haircare brand, Flawless, for women with textured hair. The collection is affordably priced and “empowers consumers to customize a regimen specific to their texture and style preference.” That same year, she joined Bitsy's as a cofounder with “the goal of making allergen-friendly, school-safe snacks that are accessible and affordable for all families regardless of their socioeconomic or geographic status.”

Union and her daughter Kaavia are a part of the ownership group of Angel City FC of the National Women's Soccer League.

== Activism ==
Union is an advocate for survivors of assault and has voiced her support for Jada, a Texas teenager who was sexually assaulted while passed out during a party. The assault, which was filmed and posted online, was mocked by others on social networking websites.

Union has also spoken about the importance of therapy, and how she herself was able to quickly find therapy with the help of family members and co-workers.

Union addressed the killing of Trayvon Martin, stating that "when you have influence, I think it's the responsible thing to do, to speak out on an issue when you see injustice. I'm still fighting for Trayvon [...] we all should." In the months following Martin's death, Union supported a petition that called for Florida District Attorney Norman Wolfinger to bring charges against George Zimmerman. After Zimmerman was acquitted of charges in Martin's death in July 2013, Union remarked, "Apparently walking while black is a crime punishable by death."

Union rebuked Todd Akin's position on abortion, which he defended saying that a woman would not be able to get pregnant in the case of "legitimate rape."

When Tanganyika Williams, the aunt of NBA player Matt Barnes, was murdered on July 8, 2014, Union posted calls on both Instagram and Twitter for anyone with information on Tanganyika's killer to report it to authorities.

Oprah Winfrey said she was inspired by Union's "Fierce and Fearless Award" acceptance speech, in which Union admitted she once reveled "in gossip and rumors," because Winfrey "never heard anyone be that honest in public or private about the competition and fierce drive to be seen and succeed in Hollywood."

In February 2012, Union was identified as a suspicious person by airport security and subjected to a "hair patdown." She tweeted a joke about the experience: "Hopefully my weave doesn't cause turbulence. It's clearly very powerful."

Union ran in the Global Race for the Cure in Washington, D.C., on Saturday, June 2, 2012, in honor of her friend Kristen Martinez, who died from breast cancer. Union was present at the Newseum in Washington, D.C., on August 23, 2013, and unveiled a limited-edition 1963 March on Washington stamp to celebrate the fiftieth anniversary of the march.

Union is an Ambassador in Susan G. Komen for the Cure's Circle of Promise. Union became a spokesperson for Planned Parenthood's breast health initiative and launched the Women Are Watching campaign with other actresses in 2012. In October 2014, it was announced that Union would be designing T-shirts to bring attention to the Women Are Watching campaign.

In 2020, Union collaborated with JusticeLA to create a public service announcement #SuingToSaveLives about the health of people in L.A. County jails amid the COVID-19 pandemic.

=== Politics ===
In 2008, Union supported Barack Obama in his presidential campaign. After working on the unsuccessful pilot for Army Wives, Union was appointed by President Obama to work with the National Advisory Committee for Violence Against Women. Obama contacted her specifically after learning that the pilot had fallen through. Union participated in the Obama campaign's "Greater Together" initiative as part of his re-election campaign in 2012. In August 2012, Union called on Republican presidential candidate Mitt Romney to release his tax returns and birth certificate, noting his father, George W. Romney, had released his own tax returns when he was a presidential candidate.

In November 2014, the office of Atlanta Mayor Kasim Reed announced a campaign titled "Take a Stand" and its commission of a short film featuring Union and Tika Sumpter. Union was named in the 2020 Time 100 list of most influential people. In the lead up to the 2020 presidential election, the actress encouraged Facebook users to make sure they had everything they needed to make their vote count by seeking out VoteRiders.

== Personal life ==
Union met NFL player Chris Howard at a party in 1999. They married on May 5, 2001, and separated in October 2005. The divorce was finalized in 2006. In a 2014 interview, Union said that she may have rushed into the relationship for the wrong reasons, stating that, "In my 20s, I was all about getting the ring". Union had earlier reflected that she spent much of the marriage "upset", and from the relationship she realized that the men in her life were "just human".

In 2008, Union began dating NBA player Dwyane Wade. They married on August 30, 2014, in Miami, Florida, and she became a stepmother to his three children. Union said in an interview before to the wedding that she and Wade would sign a prenuptial agreement to protect their individual assets. On November 7, 2018, they welcomed a daughter through surrogacy.

In an April 2023 interview, Union and Wade said that they moved their family from Florida to California partially due to Florida's anti-LGBTQ environment.

== Filmography ==
=== Film ===
Year	Title	Role	Notes
1999	She's All That	Katarina "Katie" Darlingson	
1999	10 Things I Hate About You	Chastity Church	
2000	Love & Basketball	Shawnee	
2000	Bring It On	Isis	
2001	The Brothers	Denise Johnson	
2001	Two Can Play That Game	Conny Spalding	
2002	Abandon	Amanda Luttrell	
2002	Welcome to Collinwood	Michelle	
2003	Deliver Us from Eva	Evangeline "Eva" Dandrige	
2003	Cradle 2 the Grave	Daria	
2003	Bad Boys II	Special Agent Sydney "Syd" Burnett	
2003	Ride or Die	Masked Woman	Video
2004	Breakin' All the Rules	Nicky Callas	
2005	Neo Ned	Rachael	
2005	The Honeymooners	Alice Kramden	
2005	Say Uncle	Elise Carter	
2006	Running with Scissors	Dorothy Ambrose	
2007	Constellation	Carmel Boxer	
2007	Daddy's Little Girls	Julia Rossmore	
2007	The Box	Det. Cris Romano	
2007	The Perfect Holiday	Nancy Taylor	
2008	Meet Dave	No. 3 - Cultural Officer	
2008	Cadillac Records	Geneva Wade	
2012	Think Like a Man	Kristen	
2012	Good Deeds	Natalie	
2012	In Our Nature	Vicki	
2013	Miss Dial	Long Story Caller	
2013	The Door	She	Short
2014	Think Like a Man Too	Kristen	
2014	Top Five	Erica Long	
2016	The Birth of a Nation	Esther	
2016	Almost Christmas	Rachel Meyers	
2017	Sleepless	Dena Smith	
2018	The Public	Rebecca Parks	
2018	Breaking In	Shaun Russell	
2020	Fearless	General Jayne Nadia Blazerhatch (voice)	
2022	Cheaper by the Dozen	Zoey Baker	
2022	The Inspection	Inez French	
2022	Strange World	Meridian Clade (voice)	
2023	The Perfect Find	Jenna Jones	
2024	Space Cadet	Pam	
2024	Riff Raff	Sandy	
2024	The Idea of You	—N/a	Producer
2026	Goat	Jett Fillmore (voice)	
2026	Forbidden Fruits	Sharon Sullivan	
TBA	Casket Girls †	Detective Shay Williams	Post-production; also executive producer

=== Television ===
Year	Title	Role	Notes
1993	Family Matters	Mall Girl	Episode: "Scenes from a Mall"
1995	Saved by the Bell: The New Class	Hilary	Episode: "The Christmas Gift"
1996	Moesha	Ashli	Episode: "Friends"
1996	Malibu Shores	Shannon Everette	Episode: "The Competitive Edge"
1996	Saved by the Bell: The New Class	Jennifer	Episode: "The Tall and the Short of It"
1996	Goode Behavior	Tracy Monaghan	Recurring cast
1996–1997	Jungle Cubs	Sydney (voice)	Guest cast (season 1–2)
1996–1999	7th Heaven	Keesha Hamilton	Recurring cast (season 1), guest (season 2–3)
1997	Smart Guy	Lydia	Episode: "Don't Do That Thing You Do"
1997	Dave's World	Carly	Episode: "Oh Dad, Poor Dad"
1997	Hitz	Soul	Episode: "The Godfather: Not the Movie"
1997	City Guys	Katisha Grant	Episode: "The Date"
1997	Star Trek: Deep Space Nine	N'Garen	Episode: "Sons and Daughters"
1997	Sister, Sister	Vanessa/Shawn	Guest (season 4), Recurring cast (season 5)
1998	The Steve Harvey Show	Naomi Parson	Episode: "The He-Man, Player-Hater's Club"
1999	Clueless	Lydia	Episode: "Prom Misses, Prom Misses"
1999	Grown Ups	Felicia	Episode: "Pilot"
1999	The Wonderful World of Disney	Gabrielle	Episode: "H-E Double Hockey Sticks"
2000	ER	Tamara Davis	Episode: "Family Matters"
2000	The Others	Lindsay	Episode: "Theta"
2000	Zoe, Duncan, Jack and Jane	Lana	Episode: "Too Much Pressure"
2000	City of Angels	Dr. Courtney Ellis	Main cast (season 2)
2001	Friends	Kristen Leigh	Episode: "The One With The Cheap Wedding Dress"
2003	Pepsi Smash	Herself/Host	Episode #1.4
2003	The Proud Family	Sunny Stevens/Iesha (voice)	Episode: "Hooray for Iesha"
2004	The West Wing	Meeshel Anders	Episode: "The Benign Prerogative"
2004	Something the Lord Made	Clara Thomas	TV movie
2005	TV Land's Top Ten	Herself	Episode: "Sexiest Men"
2005	Family Guy	Shauna Parks (voice)	Episode: "Peter's Got Woods"
2005–2006	Night Stalker	Perri Reed	Main cast
2007	Football Wives	Chardonnay Lane	TV movie
2008	Ugly Betty	Renee Slater	Recurring cast (season 2)
2009	Life	Detective Jane Seever	Recurring cast (season 2)
2009	Body Politic	Jessica Sharp	TV movie
2009–2010	FlashForward	Zoey Andata	Recurring cast
2009–2013	The BET Honors	Herself/Host	Main host
2010	Army Wives	Gina Holt	Episode: "Murder in Charleston"
2011	NTSF:SD:SUV::	Sandy Canyons	Episode: "Tijuana, We've Got a Problem"
2013–2019	Being Mary Jane	Mary Jane Paul	Main cast
2015	With This Ring	Kitty	TV movie
2015	The Lion Guard: Return of the Roar	Nala (voice)	TV movie
2016	Unsung Hollywood	Herself	Episode: "Meagan Good"
2016	Family Feud	Herself/Contestant	Episode #18.51
2016–2019	The Lion Guard	Nala (voice)	Recurring cast
2019	America's Got Talent	Herself/Judge	Main judge (season 14)
2019	Gay of Thrones	Herself	Episode: "The Dong Night"
2019–2020	L.A.'s Finest	Special Agent Sydney "Syd" Burnett	Main cast
2021	A Black Lady Sketch Show	Herself	Episode: "Sister, May I Call You Oshun?"
2021	Live in Front of a Studio Audience	Tootie Riley	Episode: "Diff'rent Strokes & The Facts of Life"
2023	The Cube	Herself	Episode: "America, Do You Have What It Takes?"
2023	Gabrielle Union: My Journey to 50	Herself	Main guest
2023	See It Loud: The History of Black Television	Herself	Recurring guest
2023	The Proud Family: Louder and Prouder	Talia (voice)	Episode: "Puff Daddy"
2023	Truth Be Told	Eva Pierre	Main cast (season 3)
2023	StoryBots: Answer Time	Firefighter	Episode: "Taxes"
2025	Reading Rainbow	Reader	Episode: "More Than Peach by Bellen Woodard"

=== Music videos ===
Year	Title	Artist	Ref.
1998	"Baby You Are"	Uncle Sam	
1999	"Fifteen Minutes"	Marc Nelson	
2003	"Paradise"	LL Cool J featuring Amerie	
2006	"I Love My Bitch"	Busta Rhymes featuring will.i.am and Kelis	
2008	"Miss Independent"	Ne-Yo	

=== Documentary ===
Year	Title
2012	Half the Sky
