= The Public (film) =

2018 film directed by Emilio Estevez

- Theatrical release poster
- Directed by: Emilio Estevez
- Written by: Emilio Estevez
- Produced by: Lisa Niedenthal; Emilio Estevez; Alex Lebovici; Steve Ponce
- Starring: Alec Baldwin; Emilio Estevez; Jena Malone; Taylor Schilling; Christian Slater; Che "Rhymefest" Smith; Gabrielle Union; Jacob Vargas; Michael K. Williams; Jeffrey Wright
- Cinematography: Juan Miguel Azpiroz
- Edited by: Richard Chew; Yang-Hua Hu
- Music by: Tyler Bates; Joanne Higginbottom
- Production companies: Hammerstone Studios; Living the Dream Films; E2 Films
- Distributed by: Greenwich Entertainment
- Release dates: September 8, 2018 (TIFF); April 5, 2019 (United States)
- Running time: 122 minutes
- Country: United States
- Language: English
- Box office: $694,750

The Public is a 2018 American drama film directed and written by Emilio Estevez, who also stars in the film alongside an ensemble cast including Alec Baldwin, Jena Malone, Christian Slater, Gabrielle Union, Taylor Schilling, Jacob Vargas, Michael Kenneth Williams, and Jeffrey Wright. The film had its world premiere on September 9, 2018, at the Toronto International Film Festival. It was theatrically released in the United States on April 5, 2019, by Greenwich Entertainment.

== Plot ==
After learning that emergency shelters are at full capacity when a brutal Midwestern cold front makes its way to Cincinnati, a large group of homeless library patrons led by Jackson (Michael Kenneth Williams) refuse to leave the downtown public library at closing time. What begins as a nonviolent Occupy-style sit-in and ragtag act of civil disobedience quickly escalates into a standoff with local riot police, led by a no-nonsense crisis negotiator (Alec Baldwin) and a savvy district attorney (Christian Slater) with lofty political ambitions, all as two librarians (Emilio Estevez and Jena Malone) are caught in the middle.

== Cast ==
- Emilio Estevez as Stuart Goodson, a librarian at the Cincinnati Public Library
- Alec Baldwin as Detective Bill Ramstead, a crisis negotiator for the Cincinnati Police Department
- Christian Slater as Josh Davis, the local district attorney for the City of Cincinnati
- Jena Malone as Myra, a librarian at the Cincinnati Public Library
- Taylor Schilling as Angela, Stuart's neighbor and love interest
- Michael K. Williams as Jackson, the homeless man who leads the Occupy sit-in at the library
- Jeffrey Wright as Mr. Anderson, the head librarian of the Cincinnati Public Library
- Gabrielle Union as Rebecca Parks, a local reporter
- Jacob Vargas as Ernesto, head of security for the library
- Richard T. Jones as Chief Edwards
- Bryant Bentley as Cactus Ray, the homeless man who helps Jackson in the sit-in at the library
- Ki Hong Lee as Chip
- Susanna Thompson as Marcy Ramstead, the wife of Detective Bill Ramstead
- Michael Douglas Hall as Smutts, homeless friend of Jackson's that sparks the idea of the sit-in
- Che "Rhymefest" Smith as Big George
- Pastor Bradley, competitor of Josh Davis who organizes bringing food and supplies for the homeless to the library.

== Production ==
In December 2016, it was announced that Alec Baldwin, Jena Malone, Taylor Schilling and Rhymefest would be joining Emilio Estevez in the film. A few days later, it was announced that Gabrielle Union had been cast in the film. In January 2017, it was announced that Christian Slater, Jeffrey Wright and Michael Kenneth Williams had also joined the cast of the film.

Filming began in January 2017 in Cincinnati, Ohio. Composers Tyler Bates and Joanne Higginbottom wrote the score for the film.

== Release ==
The Public held its first screening as the opening night selection at the Santa Barbara International Film Festival on January 31, 2018. It was screened multiple times at the June 2018 meeting of the American Library Association, followed by a Q&A with Emilio Estevez. Its official world premiere was later held on September 9, 2018, at the Toronto International Film Festival.

In January 2019, Universal Pictures Home Entertainment Content Group acquired American distribution rights to The Public, with Greenwich Entertainment being assigned by Universal for the film's theatrical release. The film was released in the United States on April 5, 2019.

== Reception ==
On Rotten Tomatoes, the film has a 66% approval rating from critics, based on 98 reviews, with an average score of 6.3/10. The website's consensus reads, "Its intentions are sometimes easier to appreciate than its execution, but The Public remains an earnest and reasonably engaging social advocacy drama." On Metacritic, the film has a score of 46 out of 100, based on 18 critics. Noah Gittell of the Washington City Paper wrote, "Educating viewers about the utility of civil disobedience is absolutely vital, but the message was fated to be lost the minute Estevez decided to put his spotlight on the messenger instead of the message."
