= Hope (1997 film) =

1997 television film directed by Goldie Hawn

- Film poster
- Written by: Kerry Kennedy
- Directed by: Goldie Hawn
- Starring: Christine Lahti; Jena Malone; Catherine O'Hara; Jeffrey D. Sams; J. T. Walsh
- Theme music composer: Dave Grusin
- Composer: Steve Porcaro
- Country of origin: United States
- Original language: English

Production
- Executive producers: Goldie Hawn; Teri Schwartz; Anthea Sylbert; Bill Finnegan; Patricia Finnegan; Sheldon Pinchuk
- Producer: Amanda DiGiulio
- Cinematography: Ric Waite
- Editor: Michael D. Ornstein
- Running time: 100 minutes
- Production companies: Cherry Alley Productions; Camino Palmero Productions; Finnegan/Pinchuk Productions

Original release
- Network: TNT
- Release: October 19, 1997

Hope is a 1997 American historical drama television film directed by Goldie Hawn. The film stars Christine Lahti, Jena Malone, Catherine O'Hara, Jeffrey D. Sams, and J. T. Walsh (in his last télévision film during his lifetime). It is set amid the early 1960s paranoia manufactured by the Cuban Missile Crisis and the growing restlessness of the Civil Rights Movement.

The film received positive reviews from critics, with Malone and Walsh being nominated for a Golden Globe Award and a Primetime Emmy Award, respectively, for their performances.

== Plot ==
Kate is a young intelligent girl, living in dreary small town in the early 1960s. She lives an ordinary life with her mother, a stroke victim, and her Uncle Ray, who owns a theater. Everything changes when an 8 year old black boy dies in a fire in Uncle Ray's theater.

== Cast ==
- Rodger Boyce as Judge Patterson
- Haylie Duff as Martha Jean Pruitt
- Christine Lahti as Emma Percy
- Jena Malone as Lilly Kate Burns
- Lee Norris as Billy October
- Catherine O'Hara as Muriel MacSwain
- Jeffrey D. Sams as Jediah Walker
- Mary Ellen Trainor as Maize Burns
- J. T. Walsh as Ray Percy
- Bill Wise as Deputy Sheriff

== Filming ==
Principal photography on the film began in June 1997. The story is set in a fictional Mississippi town, but was filmed in three towns in Texas.

== Release ==
The film premiered on TNT on October 19, 1997. It was released on VHS by Warner Home Video.

== Reception ==
=== Critical response ===
The film received generally positive reviews from critics, who praised Goldie Hawn's direction and the performances of the cast. Ray Richmond of Variety wrote that Hawn "embodies a surprising maturity and assurance directing this tearjerker" and "also benefits in Hope from some terrific acting support via principals Jena Malone, Christine Lahti, Jeffrey D. Sams, J. T. Walsh and Catherine O'Hara; all are at the top of their game, and it's a tribute to Hawn that they are." He concluded his review with, "Hawn displays an impressive knack for imagery, and for allowing her cast the freedom to shine." Steven Linan of the Los Angeles Times noted that Hawn "has the distinct advantage of working with a very good cast." Scott D. Pierce of Deseret News stated that "Hope is very nicely mounted, with plenty of money thrown into the production." Chris Kaltenbach of The Baltimore Sun called the film "a quiet, thoughtful, well-acted piece of work filled with what its title suggests."

=== Awards and nominations ===
Year	Award	Category	Receipt	Result
1998	American Cinema Editors Eddie Awards	Best Edited Two-Hour Movie for Commercial Television	Michael D. Ornstein	Nominated
1998	Golden Globe Awards	Best Actress in a Miniseries or Television Film	Jena Malone	Nominated
1998	Lone Star Film & Television Awards	Best TV Director	Goldie Hawn	Won
1998	Lone Star Film & Television Awards	Best TV Supporting Actress	Christine Lahti	Won
1998	Primetime Emmy Awards	Outstanding Supporting Actor in a Miniseries or Movie	J. T. Walsh	Nominated
1998	YoungStar Awards	Best Young Actress in a Mini-Series/Made for TV Film	Jena Malone	Nominated
