= In Our Nature (film) =

- Theatrical release poster
- Directed by: Brian Savelson
- Written by: Brian Savelson
- Produced by: Vincent Savino; Anish Savjani
- Starring: Zach Gilford; John Slattery; Jena Malone; Gabrielle Union
- Cinematography: Jeremy Saulnier
- Edited by: Kate Abernathy; Annette Davey
- Music by: Jeff Grace
- Production company: Film Science
- Distributed by: Cinedigm Entertainment Group
- Release date: March 10, 2012 (SXSW)
- Running time: 103 minutes
- Country: United States
- Language: English

In Our Nature is a 2012 film starring John Slattery, Gabrielle Union, Jena Malone, and Zach Gilford, and directed by Brian Savelson. It premiered at the SXSW Film Festival and was released in theaters by Cinedigm. Seth and Andie had the perfect weekend getaway planned, until an unexpected visit puts Seth's estranged father and his girlfriend in the same cabin.
