= Saved! =

2004 American satirical film

- Theatrical release poster
- Directed by: Brian Dannelly
- Written by: Brian Dannelly; Michael Urban
- Produced by: Michael Ohoven; Sandy Stern; Michael Stipe; William Vince
- Starring: Jena Malone; Mandy Moore; Macaulay Culkin; Patrick Fugit; Heather Matarazzo; Eva Amurri; Martin Donovan; Mary-Louise Parker
- Cinematography: Bobby Bukowski
- Edited by: Pamela Martin
- Music by: Christophe Beck
- Production companies: Single Cell Pictures; Infinity Media
- Distributed by: United Artists
- Release dates: January 21, 2004 (Sundance); May 28, 2004 (United States)
- Running time: 92 minutes
- Country: United States
- Budget: $5 million
- Box office: $10.3 million

Saved! is a 2004 American satirical black comedy film directed by Brian Dannelly and starring Jena Malone, Mandy Moore, Macaulay Culkin, Patrick Fugit, Heather Matarazzo, Eva Amurri, Martin Donovan, and Mary-Louise Parker. Its plot follows a teenage girl (Malone) at a Christian high school who has sex with her boyfriend in an attempt to "cure" him of his homosexuality. She becomes pregnant as a result and is ostracized by her schoolmates. It was filmed in British Columbia.

Saved! was released in the United States on May 28, 2004, by Metro-Goldwyn-Mayer, and received generally positive reviews from critics. It grossed $10 million on a $5 million budget.

== Plot ==
Devout evangelical Christian Mary Cummings is entering her senior year at American Eagle Christian High School near Baltimore. She and her friends Hilary Faye Stockard and Veronica have formed a girl group called the Christian Jewels. One afternoon, while swimming in his pool, Mary's boyfriend Dean Withers confesses to her that he suspects he is gay. In shock, Mary hits her head, and has a vision in which Jesus tells her to help Dean. Believing Jesus will forgive her, Mary loses her virginity to Dean in an attempt to restore his heterosexuality.

Dean is sent to Christian treatment center Mercy House after his parents find gay pornography in his bedroom. The news shocks and disgusts Mary's friends, aside from Hilary's sardonic, paraplegic brother Roland. Mary later discovers she is pregnant with Dean's child. Because her due date is after graduation, she opts to hide the pregnancy from her classmates and her mother, Lillian, who is covertly dating the school's principal, Pastor Skip. Feeling forsaken by Jesus and saddened by her peers' reaction to Dean's sexuality, Mary begins to question her faith. An enraged Hilary ousts Mary from the Jewels and replaces her with unpopular student Tia. Hilary, Veronica, and Tia later accost Mary in the street and attempt to perform an exorcism on her. Mary fights back, and Hilary strikes her with a Bible.

By Christmas time, rebellious Jewish student Cassandra is the only one of Mary's peers who has discovered her pregnancy. Mary befriends Cassandra and Roland, who are now dating, while ostracized by the rest of their peers. Meanwhile, Skip's son, Patrick, attempts to pursue Mary, much to Hilary's chagrin. Cassandra and Roland retaliate against Hilary's constant harassment of them by uploading photos of a young, overweight Hilary to the school's computer system. The next day, the school is vandalized with obscene, blasphemous graffiti. Suspecting Mary, Cassandra, and Roland, Skip searches their lockers, where he discovers empty spray-paint cans planted by Hilary, along with a sonogram of Mary's baby, exposing her pregnancy.

Cassandra is expelled and Mary and Roland are banned from the impending prom. Skip threatens to end his relationship with Lillian if she does not send Mary to Mercy House. Meanwhile, Roland discovers the purchase of spray paint on Hilary's credit card statement. Armed with this evidence, Mary, Roland, and Cassandra crash the prom along with Patrick, who takes Mary as his date. Hilary tries to have them ejected, but Roland confronts her with the evidence. Tia, tired of Hilary's lies and hypocrisy, also attests her guilt to Skip, having discovered a receipt with Hilary's signature.

A humiliated Hilary storms outside while Dean arrives with his boyfriend, Mitch, and other Mercy House residents. They are met by Mary and Patrick in the school foyer, where she reveals her pregnancy to Dean. Skip attempts to banish the Mercy House residents, but they refuse to leave. Patrick and Mary argue with Skip, but they are interrupted by Hilary driving recklessly through the parking lot and crashing into the school's effigy of Jesus. She then tearfully expresses remorse for her behavior and is comforted by Cassandra as Mary abruptly goes into labor and is taken to the hospital.

At the hospital, Mary gives birth to a daughter. Skip arrives with flowers and contemplates going inside. As a nurse takes a photo of the group, Mary explains in a voice-over that she has concluded that life is too beautiful to be random and meaningless, and continues to believe in a higher power of some kind.

== Cast ==
- Jena Malone as Mary Cummings, a quiet girl who attempts to help her gay ex-boyfriend, Dean, by giving him her virginity, unintentionally becoming pregnant.
- Mandy Moore as Hilary Faye Stockard, the leader of the Christian Jewels and initially Mary's best friend. She is an extremely devout conservative Christian, though very self-righteous and overbearing, much to the annoyance of others. She reluctantly cares for her disabled brother, Roland, keeping him on a tight leash.
- Macaulay Culkin as Roland Stockard, Hilary Faye's sardonic brother. He fell out of a tree as a child, leaving him a paraplegic. Unlike his sister, he does not identify as Christian.
- Eva Amurri as Cassandra Edelstein, the only Jewish girl to ever attend American Eagle. She is naturally rebellious and devious on the outside, but when she becomes friends with Mary, her true colors show in that she is actually very loyal and open.
- Patrick Fugit as Patrick Wheeler, the son of Pastor Skip, the school's principal, and Mary's love interest.
- Elizabeth Thai as Veronica; adopted from Vietnam by a pair of missionaries, she is the third Christian Jewel.
- Chad Faust as Dean Withers, Mary's boyfriend at the beginning of the film. He comes out to Mary as gay.
- Martin Donovan as Pastor Skip Wheeler, the principal of American Eagle. A superficially pious and devout minister who is permanently separated from his wife, Pastor Skip tries to remain "young and cool".
- Heather Matarazzo as Tia; somewhat of an outsider in the beginning, Tia takes Mary's place in the Jewels when Mary is kicked out.
- Mary-Louise Parker as Lillian Cummings, Mary's mother, a widow from an early age.
- Kett Turton as Mitch, a fellow gay resident of Mercy House who becomes Dean's boyfriend.
- Dave Rosin, guitarist of the Canadian pop-rock band Hedley, appears as the guitarist for the band playing in the prom scene.

== Production ==
Director and co-writer Brian Dannelly based much of the film on things he experienced and witnessed while attending a Baptist Christian high school. "I would even go so far as to say that everything in the film is something I experienced or researched", Dannelly said. "I didn't try to make up stuff." Though set in Maryland, Saved! was filmed in Vancouver, British Columbia, Canada.

== Release ==
After premiering at the Sundance Film Festival in January 2004, Saved! had a platform limited release in the U.S. on 20 screens, beginning May 28, 2004.

A DVD version is available from Metro-Goldwyn-Mayer with commentary by Dannelly, Urban, Malone, Moore, and co-producer Sandy Stern; the theatrical trailer; deleted scenes; and some bloopers. Olive Films reissued a Blu-ray edition of the film in 2016.

== Reception ==
=== Box office ===
It grossed $345,136 during its opening weekend, and an additional 11 screens were added the next weekend. After grossing an additional $340,343 during its second weekend, it expanded to 589 screens on June 11 and reached number 9 at the U.S. box office. By the end of its theatrical run in August 2004, the film grossed approximately $9 million domestically and was considered a sleeper hit. It grossed an additional $1.2 million in foreign markets, totaling $10.1 million worldwide.

=== Critical response ===
Saved! received mostly favorable reviews from critics. At critics aggregator site Rotten Tomatoes, the film holds a 61% rating from 145 reviews, with an average rating of 6.12/10. The website's critical consensus reads: "A satirical teen comedy that, unfortunately, pulls its punches." Metacritic, which uses a weighted average, assigned the film a score of 62 out of 100, based on 38 critics, indicating "generally favorable" reviews.

Roger Ebert of the Chicago Sun-Times gave the film 3 and a half out of 4 stars and praised the film despite saying it follows formulaic tropes of other teen films, adding that it has a "political message":

Jesus counseled more acceptance and tolerance than some of his followers think. By the end of the movie, mainstream Christian values have not been overthrown, but demonstrated and embraced. Those who think Christianity is just a matter of enforcing their rulebook have been, well, enlightened. And that all of this takes place in a sassy and smart teenage comedy is, well, a miracle.

Ken Fox of TV Guide gave the film three of five stars:

The first 45 minutes of this wickedly clever comedy features the smartest, tartest high-school satire since Alexander Payne's Election. Giddily unmasking the intolerance that often comes cloaked in religious piety, the film exhausts itself long before it's over. But in the spirit of the true Christian charity it ultimately extols, the film's shortcomings are forgivable.

The Christian Science Monitor's David Sterritt gave the film a favorable review, writing:

Not surprisingly, Saved! has sparked debate in religious circles. Some defend it on grounds linked to fundamentalist ideas - pointing out, for instance, that abortion isn't mentioned as an option until it's too late for Mary to have one anyway. Others find the movie's overall tone too sassy and irreverent for comfort. What the harsher critics miss is that American teenagers tend to face similar sorts of problems in all sorts of social and domestic settings. The most important thing is how they deal with their challenges, and in Saved! their search for solutions usually has a faith-based inflection, even if it's not always as straight and narrow as believers might wish.

Sean Axmaker of the Seattle Post-Intelligencer wrote of the film:

The skewering of spiritualism, dogma and passive-aggressive prayer groups has an exaggerated absurdity that borders on cartoonish (public shows of devotion is the currency of popularity and social power in this world) and Dannelly's satire is more clever than cutting. Yet he has a deft comic touch and his observation of teenage social dynamics are dead on. It's like Mean Girls with a holier-than-thou twist and a genuine (if contrived) message of acceptance.

Other critics criticized the film for alleged anti-Christian views. Slant Magazine was overwhelmingly negative on this issue, giving the film only half a star out of five and calling it the worst movie of the year.

== Stage musical ==
Playwrights Horizons produced a musical version of the film in 2008. Music and lyrics are by Michael Friedman with the book and lyrics by two-time Olivier Award nominee John Dempsey and Rinne Groff. The musical opened on June 3, 2008, at Playwrights Horizons and closed on June 22, 2008. The cast included Aaron Tveit, Celia Keenan-Bolger, John Dossett, Julia Murney, Devyn Rush, Curtis Holbrook, and Mary Faber.
