= Chloë Sevigny filmography =

Actress filmography

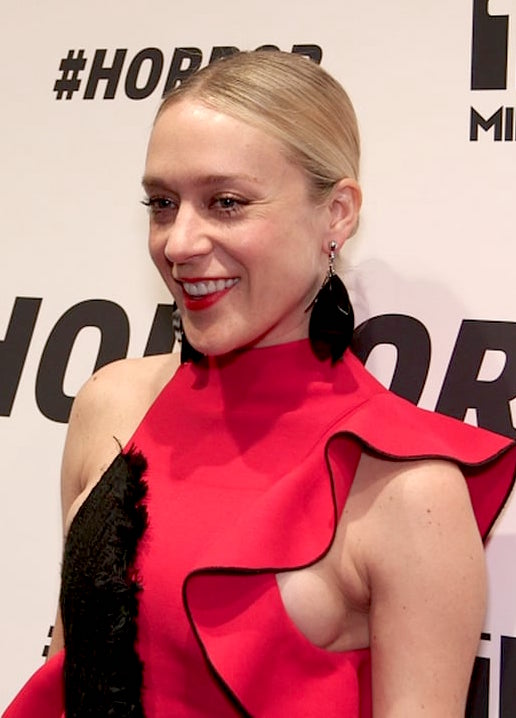
Sevigny in 2015

Chloë Sevigny is an American actress and director who made her film debut in the controversial 1995 drama Kids, portraying a teenage girl in inner-city New York who discovers she is HIV-positive. She went on to appear in several independent features, including two directed by her then-boyfriend, Harmony Korine (writer of Kids): Gummo (1997) and Julien Donkey-Boy (1998), before obtaining a lead role as Lana Tisdel in Boys Don't Cry (1999), a fact-based drama about the murder of trans man Brandon Teena. The film earned her numerous accolades, including an Academy Award nomination for Best Supporting Actress.

She went on to have numerous supporting roles in the early 2000s in such films as American Psycho (2000); Party Monster and Dogville (both 2003); and a lead role in the controversial independent film The Brown Bunny (also 2003), for which she received significant press coverage and criticism for performing on-screen unsimulated oral sex on the film's male lead and writer-director, Vincent Gallo. In 2006, Sevigny was cast in the HBO series Big Love, portraying Nicolette Grant, a fundamentalist Mormon who practices polygamy in 21st-century Utah. The series spanned a total of five seasons, for the third of which she earned a Golden Globe Award for Best Supporting Actress.

After the conclusion of Big Love in 2011, Sevigny appeared again in television, guest-starring on Portlandia (2013) as well as appearing in central roles on two seasons of American Horror Story: Asylum (2012) and Hotel (2015). In 2017, she had a supporting role in the drama Lean on Pete, followed by a lead role portraying Lizzie Borden in the drama Lizzie (2018). Sevigny made her directorial debut with the short film Kitty, which premiered at the 2016 Cannes Film Festival, followed by the short film Carmen, which she directed for a 2017 Miu Miu campaign. In 2019, she appeared in a lead role in Jim Jarmusch's zombie comedy The Dead Don't Die, and in the drama The True Adventures of Wolfboy.

== Film ==
Key
†	Denotes film or TV productions that have not yet been released

Year	Title	Role	Notes	Ref.
1995	Kids	Jennie		
1996	Trees Lounge	Debbie		
1997	Gummo	Dot	Also costume designer	
1998	Palmetto	Odette		
1998	The Last Days of Disco	Alice Kinnon		
1999	Boys Don't Cry	Lana Tisdel		
1999	Julien Donkey-Boy	Pearl		
1999	A Map of the World	Carole Mackessy		
2000	American Psycho	Jean		
2002	Ten Minutes Older		Segment 4: "Int. Trailer. Night."	
2002	Demonlover	Elise Lipsky		
2003	Party Monster	Gitsie		
2003	Death of a Dynasty	Sexy Woman		
2003	Dogville	Liz Henson		
2003	The Brown Bunny	Daisy		
2003	Shattered Glass	Caitlin Avey		
2004	Melinda and Melinda	Laurel		
2004	Jiminy Glick in Lalawood	Herself	Cameo	
2005	Manderlay	Philomena		
2005	Broken Flowers	Carmen's Assistant		
2005	3 Needles	Clara		
2006	Lying	Megan		
2006	Sisters	Grace Collier		
2007	Zodiac	Melanie		
2009	The Killing Room	Emily Reilly		
2009	My Son, My Son, What Have Ye Done?	Ingrid		
2009	Beloved	Kim	Short film	
2010	All Flowers in Time	Holly	Short film	
2010	Beautiful Darling	Candy Darling	Voice only; documentary film	
2010	Barry Munday	Jennifer Farley		
2010	Mr. Nice	Judy Marks		
2013	Lovelace	Rebecca		
2013	The Wait	Emma		
2014	Little Accidents	Kendra Briggs		
2014	Electric Slide	Charlotte		
2014	The Beckoning		Short film	
2015	Black Dog, Red Dog	Ali		
2015	#Horror	Alex Cox		
2016	Love & Friendship	Alicia Johnson		
2016	Antibirth	Sadie		
2016	Kitty	—N/a	Short film; writer and director	
2017	Golden Exits	Alyssa		
2017	Beatriz at Dinner	Shannon		
2017	The Dinner	Barbara Lohman		
2017	Lean on Pete	Bonnie		
2017	The Snowman	Sylvia Ottersen / Ane Pedersen		
2017	Carmen	—N/a	Short film; co-writer and director	
2018	Lizzie	Lizzie Borden	Also producer	
2019	Love Is Blind	Carolyn		
2019	The Dead Don't Die	Minerva Morrison		
2019	White Echo	—N/a	Short film; director	
2019	The True Adventures of Wolfboy	Jen Harker		
2019	Queen & Slim	Mrs. Shepherd		
2020	Slow Machine	Chloë		
2022	Bones and All	Janelle Yearly		
2024	Bonjour Tristesse	Anne		
2025	Atropia	Pina		
2025	John Lilly and the Earth Coincidence Control Office	Narrator	Documentary film	
2025	Magic Farm	Edna		
2025	After the Hunt	Dr. Kim Sayers		
TBA	The Lonely Woman †			

== Television ==
Year	Title	Role	Notes	Ref.
2000	If These Walls Could Talk 2	Amy	Television film	
2004	Will & Grace	Monet	Episode: "East Side Story"	
2005	Mrs. Harris	Lynne Tryforos	Television film	
2006–2011	Big Love	Nicolette Grant	53 episodes	
2011	RuPaul's Drag Race	Herself	2 episodes	
2012	Law & Order: Special Victims Unit	Christine Hartwell	Episode: "Valentine's Day"	
2012	Hit & Miss	Mia	Miniseries; 6 episodes	
2012	Louie	Jeanie	Episode: "Looking for Liz/Lilly Changes"	
2012	American Horror Story: Asylum	Shelley	6 episodes	
2013	Portlandia	Alexandra	9 episodes	
2013	The Mindy Project	Christina	6 episodes	
2014	Doll & Em	Herself	2 episodes	
2014	Those Who Kill	Catherine Jensen	10 episodes	
2014	The Cosmopolitans	Vicky Frasier	Pilot	
2015–2017	Bloodline	Chelsea O'Bannon	24 episodes	
2015–2016	American Horror Story: Hotel	Dr. Alex Lowe	12 episodes	
2016	Dr. Del	Brandy Sommers	Pilot	
2017	Comrade Detective	Sonya Baciu (voice)	5 episodes	
2019–2022	Russian Doll	Lenora Vulvokov	8 episodes	
2019	The Act	Mel	6 episodes	
2020	We Are Who We Are	Sarah Wilson	8 episodes	
2022	The Girl from Plainville	Lynn Roy	8 episodes	
2023	Poker Face	Ruby Ruin	Episode: "Rest in Metal"	
2024	Feud: Capote vs. The Swans	C. Z. Guest	8 episodes	
2024	Monsters: The Lyle and Erik Menendez Story	Mary Louise "Kitty" Menendez	8 episodes	
2026	The Five-Star Weekend	Tatum McKenzie	Main cast	
2026	The Real Housewives of New York City	Herself	Episode: "Gloves Off at the Gala"	

== Music videos ==
Year	Title	Role	Artist	Ref.
1992	"Sugar Kane"	Girl	Sonic Youth	
1994	"Big Gay Heart"	Girl at Club	The Lemonheads	
1995	"Old Jerusalem"	Girl	Palace Music	
2005	"I Feel Like the Mother of the World"	Maid	Smog	
2008	"Gamma Ray (Version 1)"	Dancer	Beck	
2009	"Any Fun"	Skateboarder	Coconut Records	
2009	"Lazy Slam"		The Slits	
2009	"It's Only You, Isn't It?"	Car Owner	Lissy Trullie	
2011	"Make Some Noise/Fight For Your Right (Revisited)"	Girl	Beastie Boys	
2024	"360"	Herself	Charli XCX	
