= List of awards and nominations received by Chloë Sevigny =

Chloë Sevigny awards and nominations
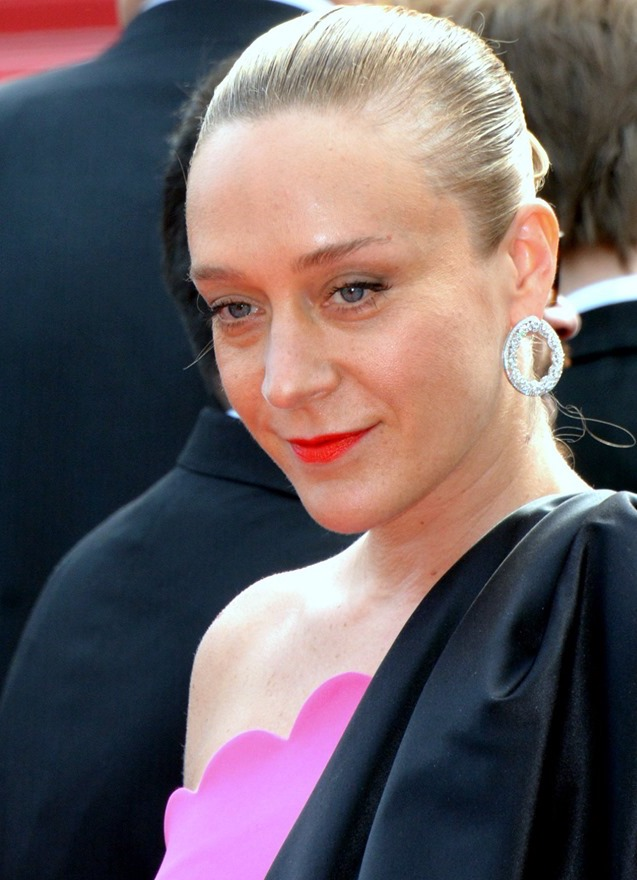
- Sevigny at the 2019 Cannes Film Festival
| Award | Wins | Nominations |
Totals
| Academy Awards | 0 | 1 |
| AFI Awards | 0 | 1 |
| Cannes Film Festival | 0 | 1 |
| Golden Globe Awards | 1 | 2 |
| Independent Spirit Awards | 1 | 1 |
| MTV Movie Awards | 0 | 1 |
| Primetime Emmy Awards | 0 | 1 |
| Satellite Awards | 1 | 2 |
| Screen Actors Guild Awards | 0 | 1 |
| Critics associations | 5 | 3 |
| Wins | 8 |
| Nominations | 13 |

The accolades of American actress and director Chloë Sevigny include two Golden Globe Award nominations (including one win), two Independent Spirit Award nominations (including one win), a Primetime Emmy Award nomination, and an Academy Award nomination for Best Supporting Actress.

Sevigny made her feature film debut in Kids (1995), for which she was nominated for an Independent Spirit Award for Best Supporting Actress. She would subsequently appear in several independent films before portraying Lana Tisdel, a woman who unknowingly falls in love with a trans man, in the biographical drama Boys Don't Cry (1999). For her portrayal, Sevigny earned an Academy Award nomination for Best Supporting Actress, as well as Golden Globe Award and Screen Actors Guild Award nominations in the same category; she was the recipient of a Satellite Award for Best Supporting Actress.

After appearing in numerous feature films throughout the 2000s, Sevigny would earn further critical acclaim for her portrayal of Nicolette Grant, a Mormon fundamentalist, on the HBO series Big Love, earning a Satellite Award nomination for Best Supporting Actress in a Series, Miniseries, or Television Film in 2009. The following year, Sevigny won a Golden Globe Award for Best Supporting Actress in a Series, Miniseries, or Television Film for her portrayal of Grant in the series' third season. Sevigny received further critical recognition for her appearance on the British miniseries Hit & Miss (2012), earning a third Satellite Award nomination. For her performance as Kitty Menendez in Monsters: The Lyle and Erik Menendez Story, Sevigny received her first Primetime Emmy Award nomination for Outstanding Supporting Actress in a Limited or Anthology Series or Movie.

== Major associations ==
=== Academy Awards ===
| Year | Category | Nominated work | Result | Ref. |
|---|---|---|---|---|
| 2000 | Best Supporting Actress | Boys Don't Cry | Nominated | |

=== Critics' Choice Awards ===
| Year | Category | Nominated work | Result | Ref. |
Critics' Choice Television Awards
| 2011 | Best Supporting Actress in a Drama Series | Big Love | Nominated | |

=== Emmy Awards ===
| Year | Category | Nominated work | Result | Ref. |
Primetime Emmy Awards
| 2025 | Outstanding Supporting Actress in a Limited Series or Movie | Monsters: The Lyle and Erik Menendez Story | Nominated | |

=== Golden Globe Awards ===
| Year | Category | Nominated work | Result | Ref. |
|---|---|---|---|---|
| 2000 | Best Supporting Actress – Motion Picture | Boys Don't Cry | Nominated | |
| 2010 | Best Supporting Actress – Series, Miniseries or Television Film | Big Love | Won | |

=== Screen Actors Guild Awards ===
| Year | Category | Nominated work | Result | Ref. |
|---|---|---|---|---|
| 2000 | Outstanding Actress in a Supporting Role | Boys Don't Cry | Nominated | |

== Miscellaneous awards ==
| Organizations | Year | Category | Work | Result | Ref. |
|---|---|---|---|---|---|
| AFI Fest | 2016 | Grand Jury Prize for Best Live Action Short Film | Kitty | Nominated | |
| Cannes Film Festival | 2016 | Palme d'Or for Best Short Film | White Echo | Nominated | |
| Independent Spirit Awards | 1996 | Best Supporting Female | Kids | Nominated | |
| Independent Spirit Awards | 2000 | Best Supporting Female | Boys Don't Cry | Won | |
| MTV Movie Awards | 2000 | Best Kiss (with Hilary Swank) | Boys Don't Cry | Nominated | |
| Satellite Awards | 2000 | Best Supporting Actress – Motion Picture | Boys Don't Cry | Won | |
| Satellite Awards | 2009 | Best Supporting Actress – Series, Miniseries or Television Film | Big Love | Nominated | |
| Satellite Awards | 2012 | Best Actress – Television Series Drama | Hit & Miss | Nominated | |

== Critics associations ==
| Organizations | Year | Category | Work | Result | Ref. |
|---|---|---|---|---|---|
| Boston Society of Film Critics | 1999 | Best Supporting Actress | Boys Don't Cry | Won | |
| Chicago Film Critics Association | 1999 | Best Supporting Actress | Boys Don't Cry | Won | |
| Los Angeles Film Critics Association | 1999 | Best Supporting Actress | Boys Don't Cry | Won | |
| Las Vegas Film Critics Society | 2000 | Best Supporting Actress | Boys Don't Cry | Won | |
| National Society of Film Critics | 2000 | Best Supporting Actress | Boys Don't Cry | Won | |
| Online Film Critics Society | 2000 | Best Supporting Actress | Boys Don't Cry | Nominated | |
| Southeastern Film Critics Association | 2000 | Best Supporting Actress | Boys Don't Cry | Nominated | |
