= Family Portraits: A Trilogy of America =

- Promotional poster
- Directed by: Douglas Buck
- Written by: Douglas Buck
- Produced by: Douglas Buck; Rita Romagnino
- Cinematography: Nicola Saraval
- Edited by: Douglas Buck
- Music by: Edward Dzubak; David Kristian
- Release dates: September 5, 2003 (Oldenburg Film Festival); August 20, 2004 (Montreal); October 15, 2004 (New York City)
- Running time: 103 minutes
- Country: United States
- Language: English

Family Portraits: A Trilogy of America is a 2003 American anthology horror film written and directed by Douglas Buck. It comprises three short films, the first being Buck's student film Cutting Moments, along with two subsequent shorts, Home and Prologue. Buck referred to the film as a "Suburban Holocaust" trilogy.

The segments of Family Portraits: A Trilogy of America were shot over the course of several years: Cutting Room was completed in 1996, Home was completed in 1997, and Prologue was completed in 2002. The three short films were compiled by Buck in 2003, with the anthology premiering at the Oldenburg International Film Festival in September of that year. The film received a limited theatrical release, screening at independent theaters in Montreal and New York City in late 2004 before being released on DVD in February 2006. Severin Films issued a Blu-ray edition in January 2021.

== Plot ==
=== I: Cutting Moments ===
Married couple Patrick and Sarah live in a suburban subdivision along with their young son, Joey. The couple have an emotionally distant marriage devoid of intimacy. Meanwhile, Patrick sexually abuses Joey on a regular basis, which Sarah is aware of.

Authorities suspect Patrick's abuse of Joey. Sarah tells Patrick that she has spoken to a lawyer, who suggests he will soon be taken from them by child protective services. Desperate for Patrick's affection, Sarah dons a red dress and applies lipstick, hoping for Patrick to notice her. The attempt fails, as she goes unnoticed by Patrick, who continues to watch a sports game and ignore her. Using a scouring pad, Sarah scrubs her lips until they are raw and bleeding before cutting them off with a pair of scissors.

A mutilated Sarah approaches Patrick, who responds to her self-mutilation. The two engage in violent mutilation and sex, in which a tearful Patrick cuts off Sarah's breasts with garden shears before cutting off his own penis. The couple bleed to death lying on top of one another.

=== II: Home ===
Gary, a troubled young man, reflects on his upbringing under his domineering, abusive father who tormented him and his mother. Gary dealt with his childhood trauma through self-harm, flagellating himself with a belt. As an adult, Gary becomes a devout Christian. He meets Helen at a party, and the two eventually marry and have a daughter, Cassandra.

A mentally-unstable Gary eventually murders Helen and Cassandra. Covered in blood, he sits on his front porch, reflecting how he feels his father's presence, sobbing.

=== Prologue ===
In a rural farming community, a young woman named Billy returns home after recovering from a violent attack in which her hands were dismembered. Billy, who was a missing person during her brutalization, has no memory of the incident or her attacker. Billy is fitted with prosthetic hook arms.

Meanwhile, middle-aged couple Benjamin and Joan reside in the same community on their farm. Their daughter, Angela, has been absent for an extended period. Joan runs into an acquaintance, Jimmy, on the street, and tells him Angela has been living in London. Later at home, Joan confesses to Benjamin that she lied to Jimmy about Angela's whereabouts.

While visiting the local post office with her father, Billy fixates on the United States Postal Service emblem on the uniform of a school classmate, Jeff; well as a photograph on the wall of Benjamin, a retired employee—the experience triggers a repressed memory in which Billy realizes Benjamin was her attacker. Later that day, Billy arrives at Benjamin and Joan's farmhouse. She silently confronts Benjamin on the front steps and begins to pull back her hook arm to strike him, but stops when he recoils and begins crying. After Billy leaves, Joan remarks that Benjamin told her Angela's death was an accident. He does not respond. Outside, Joan approaches Benjamin with a rifle. He confesses to murdering Angela, disfiguring Billy, and committing other serial murders. She tells him she knows, before walking away with Angela's teddy bear.

Later, outside the post office, Joan approaches Billy on the street, where she offers her Angela's teddy bear before walking away. Billy witnesses a young girl playing in the street, and offers her the teddy bear, which she takes. Back at Benjamin and Joan's farmhouse, Joan sobs after vandalizing the home. Outside in the fields, Benjamin quietly digs a grave.

== Cast ==
- Jared Barsky as Joey (Segment I) / Gary (Segment II)
- Gary Betsworth as Patrick (Segment I)
- Nica Ray as Sarah (Segment I)
- Christine Caleo as Helen (Segment II)
- Jayne Deely as Cassandra (Segment II)
- Ray Bland as Father (Segment II)
- Deborah Floray as Mother (Segment II)
- Sally Conway as Billy (Prologue)
- Larry Fessenden as Jimmy Doyle (Prologue)
- Beth Glover as Joan (Prologue)
- William Mahoney as Benjamin (Prologue)

== Production ==
Cutting Moments was completed in 1996 while Buck was studying filmmaking at The New School. The short's special effects were supervised by Tom Savini. The second segment, Home, was shot the following year in 1997, while Prologue was completed in 2002. The story for Prologue was loosely based on the case of Mary Vincent, a teenager who survived a brutal attack in which her arms were dismembered by killer Lawrence Singleton in California in 1978.

Commenting on the film, Buck said:

The kernel for the idea of [Cutting Room], from the initial gestation to the final go-through was a year. But it was a quick process, and that was in ’96. So the whole venture was more like a four-month or five-month kind of thing. I shot it, edited it, and was done with it. Very quick and easy, even the writing of it. All three of the short films, Cutting Moments, Home, and Prologue, were all actually quite quick and easy processes. I wrote them, I storyboarded them, I shot them, and I put them together the way I had envisioned them right from the beginning. I have to say that those three films, far more than Sisters, which is a different animal altogether the way it was created and everything, but those three short films came very fast out of me.

== Release ==
Family Portraits: A Trilogy of America was released theatrically in Montreal on August 20, 2004. It later screened at the Two Boots Pioneer Theater in New York City's East Village beginning October 15, 2004. The film screened at Cinefest at Georgia State University in Atlanta on March 30, 2005.

=== Home media ===
Home Vision Entertainment released the film on DVD on February 21, 2006. Severin Films released the film on Blu-ray on January 21, 2021.

== Reception ==
Reviewing the film for DVD Talk, Ian Jane likened the films to those of Todd Solondz and Ingmar Bergman, summarizing: "Before you instantly dismiss that as shot on video garbage, let it stand that not only are the three movies in this set shot on film but they're some of the most mind-bending and intense examples of what a horror movie can be to come down the pipe in a long while. In short, they're the cinematic equivalent to a swift punch to the balls, but in the best possible way. They hurt you, they make you feel something sharp and fast, and they leave you wanting to curl up in the fetal position and cry." John Anderson of Newsday praised the film with a three and a half out of four-star rating, writing: "Douglas Buck's triptych of domestic terror is the truest of horror films, a work that in its insistent obliqueness creates an American Gothic of gore and the unknown."

In A Companion to American Gothic (2013), scholar Bernice M. Murphy notes that the film "presents one of the bleakest and most scathing portraits of suburban family dysfunction in an American setting to date."

Natalia Keogan of Filmmaker praised the film in a 2022 retrospective, writing "the film cuts far deeper than a few fleshy pounds of adipose tissue. It gives the “torture porn” subgenre of post-9/11 American horror films a run for their money, all while carefully surmising the cruelty at the heart of this country’s culture."

== Sources ==
- Murphy, Bernice M. (2013). ""Identical Boxes Spreading Like Gangrene": Identifying the Suburban Gothic". In Crow, Charles L. (ed.). A Companion to American Gothic. Oxford, England: John Wiley & Sons. pp. 315–327. ISBN 978-1-118-60842-5.
