= Haley Wollens =

American fashion stylist

- Born: 1986 or 1987 (age 38–39); New York City, U.S.
- Education: Savannah College of Art and Design; School of Visual Arts
- Occupation: Fashion stylist
- Years active: 2004–present
- Website: haleywollens.world

Haley Wollens is an American fashion stylist. She is known for her work with musicians including Blood Orange, Miley Cyrus, Drake, and M.I.A. She styles actor Chloë Sevigny, with Vogue writing that "[Sevigny] and stylist Haley Wollens simply never miss."

== Early life and education ==
Wollens grew up in the East Village of New York City. Her mother worked in the fashion industry. She has a brother. During high school, she interned at The Good The Bad and The Ugly, a clothing store in the neighborhood. She studied motion media design at Savannah College of Art and Design (SCAD), before transferring to the School of Visual Arts for graphic design.

== Career ==
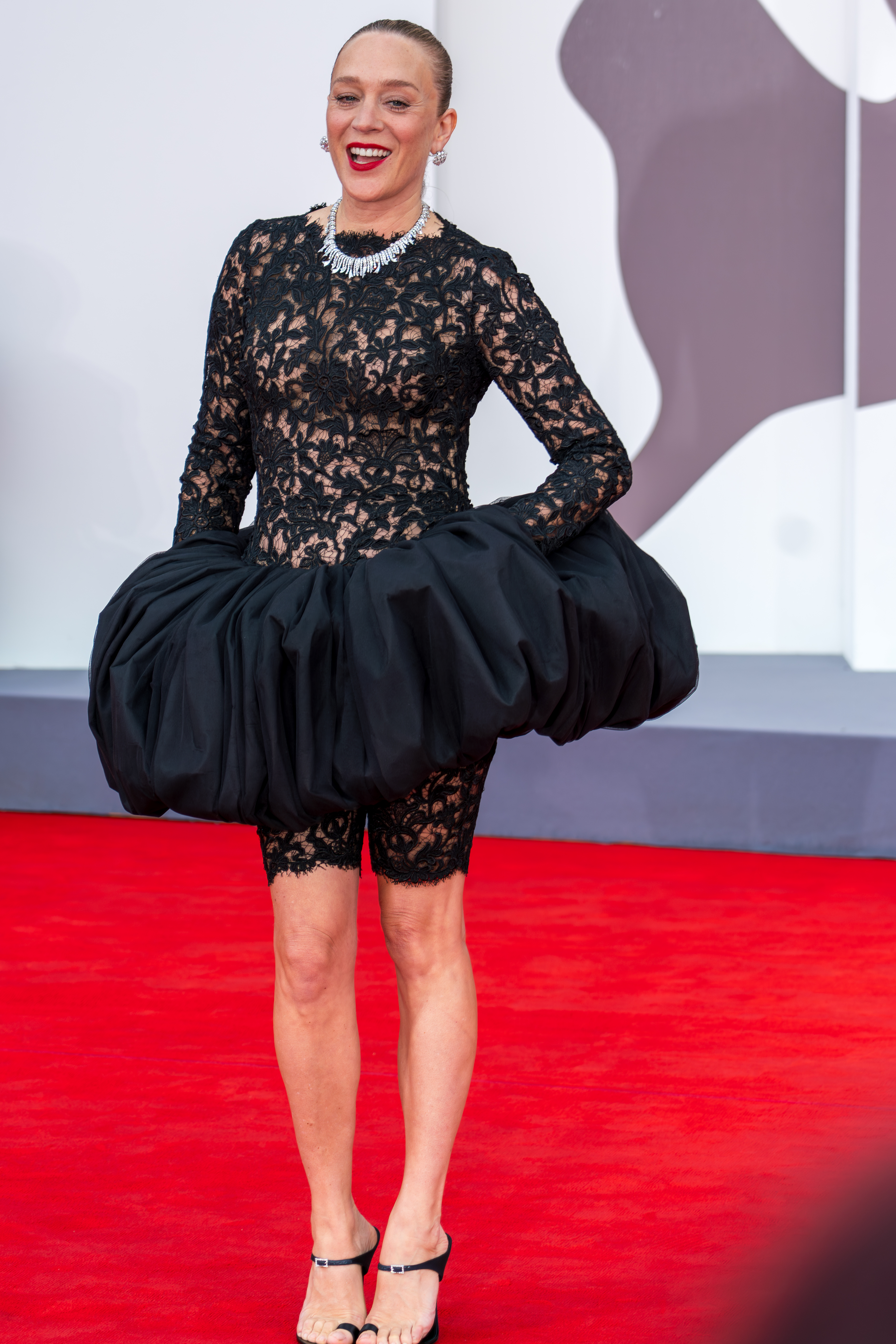
Chloë Sevigny at the 2025 Venice Film Festival in custom Saint Laurent lace dress with bubble skirt and Tiffany & Co. jewelry, styled by Wollens

In 2004, while attending SCAD, The Fader magazine's fashion editor connected Wollens with singer M.I.A., who hired Wollens for her tour. She then worked for stylist Mel Ottenberg.

Her music industry clients have included Arca, Blood Orange, Miley Cyrus, Drake, and Inc. In 2012, she expanded into music video direction, styling and directing Blood Orange's "Champagne Coast" and directing the animation for BenZel & Jessie Ware's "If You Love Me." The following year, she styled Cyrus's "23" music video.

Her commercial work has included campaigns, lookbooks, and styling for Alexander Wang x Adidas Originals, Dsquared2, Hood By Air, Mugler and Wolford, Nike+ FuelBand, and Opening Ceremony.

Wollens styles actor Chloë Sevigny for events, covers, and campaigns, including styling Sevigny in three ensembles for her 2022 wedding.

In 2024, Wollens launched Myth Magazine, a digital fashion publication, as editor in chief. The first issue included contributors Mariacarla Boscono, Chloë Sevigny, and Telfar Clemens.

== Personal life ==
Wollens is based in New York City.
