= Chloë Sevigny =

American actress and director (born 1974)

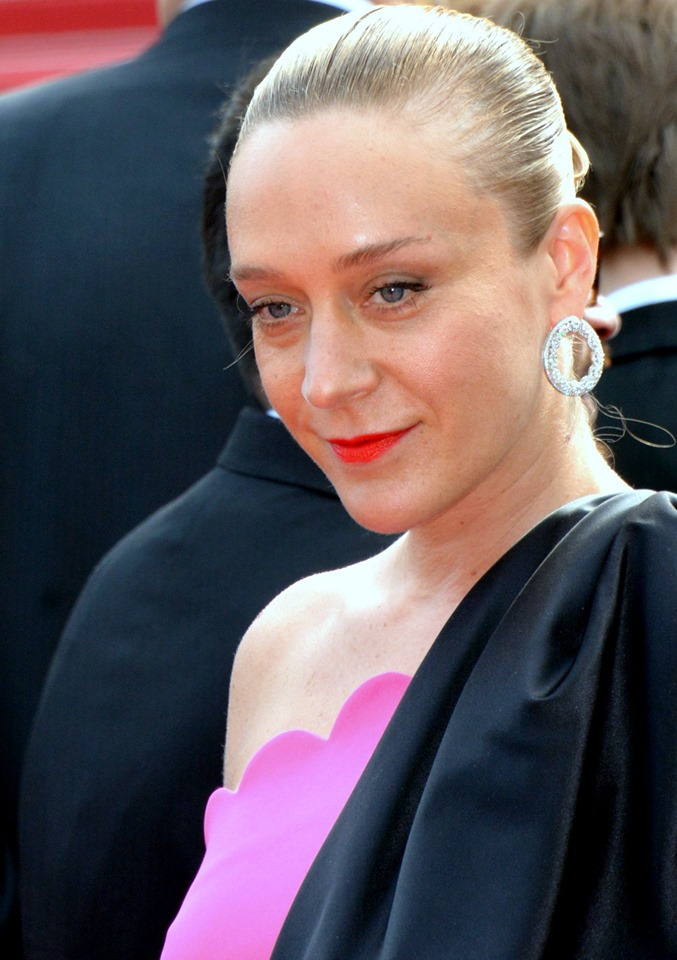
- Sevigny at the 72nd Cannes Film Festival in 2019
- Born: Chloe Stevens Sevigny; November 18, 1974 (age 51); Springfield, Massachusetts, U.S.
- Occupations: Actress; director
- Years active: 1992–present
- Works: Filmography
- Spouse: Siniša Mačković (m. 2020)
- Children: 1
- Awards: Full list
- Website: www.chloesevigny.com

Chloë Stevens Sevigny (/ˈsɛvəni/ SEV-ən-ee; born November 18, 1974) is an American actress and director. Known for her work in independent films with controversial or experimental themes, her accolades include a Golden Globe Award, in addition to nominations for an Academy Award and a Primetime Emmy Award.

After graduating from high school, Sevigny found work as a model, and appeared in music videos for Sonic Youth and The Lemonheads, which helped acquire her "it girl" status. In 1995, she made her film debut in Kids, and became a prominent performer in the independent film scene throughout the late 1990s, with roles in such films as 1996's Trees Lounge. Sevigny rose to prominence with her portrayal of Lana Tisdel in the drama film Boys Don't Cry (1999), for which she received a nomination for the Academy Award For Best Supporting Actress.

Throughout the 2000s, Sevigny appeared in supporting parts in numerous independent films, including American Psycho (2000), Demonlover (2002); Party Monster and Dogville (both 2003); and The Brown Bunny (2004). Her participation in The Brown Bunny caused considerable controversy due to a scene in which she performed unsimulated fellatio. From 2006 to 2011, Sevigny portrayed Nicolette Grant on the HBO series Big Love, for which she won a Golden Globe Award for Best Supporting Actress in 2010. She also appeared in mainstream films such as David Fincher's Zodiac (2007), and starred in numerous television projects, including the British series Hit & Miss (2012), and having supporting roles in Portlandia (2013), two seasons of American Horror Story; and in the Netflix series Bloodline (2015–2017). For her performance in Monsters: The Lyle and Erik Menendez Story (2024), she earned her first Primetime Emmy Award nomination for Outstanding Supporting Actress in a Limited or Anthology Series or Movie.

Sevigny made her directorial debut in 2016 with the short film Kitty. Her third film as a director, a short titled White Echo, competed for the Short Film Palme d'Or at the 2019 Cannes Film Festival. She also has a career in fashion design concurrent with her acting work. Over the years, her alternative fashion sense has earned her a reputation as a style icon.

== Early life ==
Chloe Stevens Sevigny was born in Springfield, Massachusetts, on November 18, 1974, the second child of Janine (née Malinowski) and Harold David Sevigny (1940–1996). Shortly before her birth, Sevigny's parents had resided in Marin County, California, before returning to the East Coast. She has one older brother, Paul, who is a member of the band A.R.E. Weapons. According to Sevigny, she added the diaeresis to her first name later in life, and it was not on her birth certificate. Her mother is Polish-American, and her father was of French-Canadian heritage.

Sevigny and her brother were raised in a strict Catholic household in affluent Darien, Connecticut, where her father worked first as an accountant, and then as an art teacher. Despite Darien's wealth, the Sevignys had a "frugal" household, and were considered "the poor bohemians in [an] extremely prosperous neighborhood". Sevigny has stated that her father "worked very hard to bring us up in that town ... He wanted us to grow up in a really safe environment."

As a child, Sevigny was diagnosed with scoliosis, but never received any surgical treatment for it. She often spent summers attending theater camp, with leading roles in plays run by the YMCA. She attended Darien High School, where she was a member of the Alternative Learning Program. While in high school, she often babysat actor Topher Grace and his younger sister. As a young teenager, she worked sweeping the tennis courts of a country club her family could not afford to join.

Sevigny described herself as a "loner" and a "depressed teenager" whose only extracurricular activities were occasionally skateboarding with her older brother and sewing her own clothes. In high school, she grew rebellious and began experimenting with drugs, particularly hallucinogens. She has said that her father was aware of her experimentation, and even told her that it was okay, but that she had "to stop if she had bad trips". Despite her father's leniency, her mother forced her to attend Alcoholics Anonymous meetings.

Sevigny later stated about her teenage drug use that "I had a great family life—I would never want it to look as if it reflected on them. I think I was very bored ... I often feel it's because I experimented when I was younger that I have no interest as an adult. I know a lot of adults who didn't, and it's much more dangerous when you start experimenting with drugs as an adult."

Sevigny's father died of cancer in 1996, when she was 22 years old.

== Career ==
=== 1992–1998: Modeling and early acting roles ===
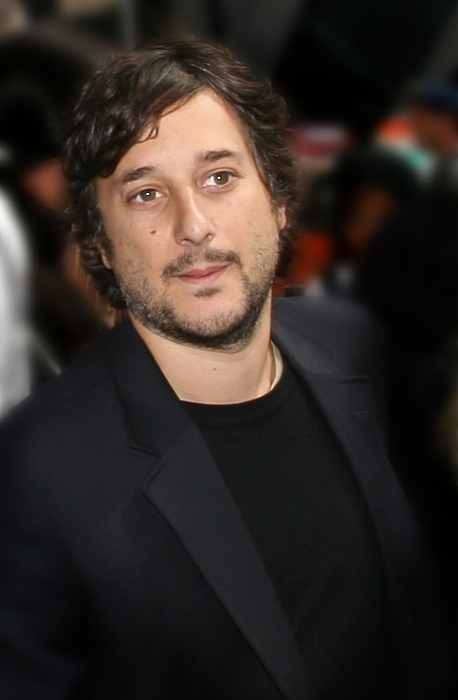
Sevigny is close friends with Harmony Korine and made her acting debut in his film Kids (1995)

As a teenager, Sevigny would occasionally ditch school in Darien and take the train into Manhattan. In 1992, at age 17, she was spotted on an East Village street by Andrea Linett, a fashion editor of Sassy magazine, who was so impressed by her style that she asked her to model for the magazine; she was later made an intern. When recounting the event, Sevigny recalled that Linett "just liked the hat I was wearing." She later modeled in the magazine as well as for X-Girl, the subsidiary fashion label of the Beastie Boys' "X-Large", designed by Kim Gordon of Sonic Youth, which she followed with an appearance in the music video for Sonic Youth's "Sugar Kane". In 1993, at age 19, Sevigny relocated from her Connecticut hometown to an apartment in Brooklyn, and worked as a seamstress. During that time, author Jay McInerney spotted her around New York City and wrote a seven-page article about her for The New Yorker in which he dubbed her the new "it girl" and referred to her as one of the "coolest girls in the world." She subsequently appeared on the album cover of Gigolo Aunts' 1994 recording Flippin' Out and the EP Full-On Bloom, as well as in a Lemonheads music video, which further increased her reputation on New York's early 1990s underground scene.

Sevigny met screenwriter and aspiring director Harmony Korine in Washington Square Park during her senior year of high school in 1993. The two became close friends, which resulted in her being cast in the low-budget independent film Kids (1995), which was written by Korine and directed by Larry Clark. Sevigny played a New York teenager who discovers she is HIV positive. According to Sevigny, she was originally cast in a much smaller role, but ended up replacing Canadian actress Mia Kirshner. Just two days before production began, the leading role went to Sevigny, who was 19 at the time and had no professional acting experience. Kids was highly controversial. The film was given an NC-17 rating by the Motion Picture Association of America for its graphic depiction of sexuality and drug use involving teenagers. Despite this, the film was taken note of critically. Janet Maslin of The New York Times considered it a "wake-up call to the modern world" about the nature of the American youth in contemporary urban settings. Sevigny's performance was praised, with critics noting that she brought a tenderness to the chaotic, immoral nature of the film: "Sevigny provided the warm, reflective centre in this feral film." She received nomination for the Independent Spirit Award for Best Supporting Female.

In 1996, Sevigny starred in actor/director Steve Buscemi's independent film Trees Lounge, in a relatively small role as Buscemi's object of affection. During this time, director Mary Harron, after having seen Kids, offered Sevigny a minor part in her film I Shot Andy Warhol (1996). Harron tracked Sevigny down to the SoHo clothing store Liquid Sky, where she was working at the time. Sevigny then gave her first audition ever, but ultimately decided to turn down the part. She later worked with Harron on American Psycho (2000). Instead of taking the part in I Shot Andy Warhol, Sevigny starred in and worked as a fashion designer on Gummo (1997), directed and written by Harmony Korine, who was romantically involved with Sevigny during and after filming. Gummo was as controversial as Sevigny's debut; set in Xenia, Ohio, the film depicts an array of nihilistic characters in a poverty-stricken community, and presents themes of drug and sexual abuse as well as anti-social alienated youth. Recalling the film, Sevigny cited it as one of her favorite projects: "Young people love that movie. It's been stolen from every Blockbuster in America. It's become a cult film". The film was dedicated to Sevigny's father, who died prior to the film's release. (Note: The credits of Gummo read: "This film is dedicated to David Sevigny, a beautiful sailor.")

In 1998, Sevigny starred in the neo-noir thriller Palmetto, playing a young Florida kidnapee alongside Woody Harrelson. Stephen Hunter of The Washington Post lambasted the film for having "bad writing," ultimately deeming it "somewhat dull and sluggish." She then had a leading role as a Hampshire College graduate in the sardonic period piece The Last Days of Disco (1998), alongside Kate Beckinsale. The film was written and directed by cult director Whit Stillman and details the rise and fall of the Manhattan club scene in the early 1980s. Stillman said of Sevigny: "Chloë is a natural phenomenon. You're not directing, she's not performing—it's just real." Janet Maslin of The New York Times wrote that Sevigny "is seductively demure" in her performance as Alice. The film was generally well received, but was not a box-office success in the United States, only grossing $3 million—it has since become somewhat of a success as a cult film.

Aside from film work, Sevigny starred in a 1998 Off-Broadway production of Hazelwood Jr. High, which tells the true story of the 1992 murder of Shanda Sharer. Sevigny played 17-year-old Laurie Tackett, one of four girls responsible for torturing and murdering 12-year-old Sharer. Sevigny stated she was so emotionally disturbed after playing the role that she began attending Mass again.

=== 1999–2006: Boys Don't Cry and The Brown Bunny ===
In 1999, Sevigny was cast in the independent drama Boys Don't Cry after director Kimberly Peirce saw her performance in The Last Days of Disco. Sevigny's role in Boys Don't Cry—a biographical film of trans man Brandon Teena, who was raped and murdered in Humboldt, Nebraska in 1993—was responsible for her rise to prominence and her mainstream success. Sevigny played Lana Tisdel, a young woman who fell in love with Teena, initially unaware of the fact that he was a transgender man and continued the relationship after learning about his gender identity. Boys Don't Cry received high praise from critics, and was a moderate box-office success. The film was widely credited as featuring some of the best acting of the year, with Sevigny's performance widely praised. The Los Angeles Times stated that she "plays the role with haunting immediacy", Roger Ebert of the Chicago Sun Times stated that "it is Sevigny who provides our entrance into the story" and Rolling Stone wrote that she gives a "performance that burns into the memory". The role earned Sevigny supporting actress nominations for both an Academy Award and a Golden Globe Award. She won an Independent Spirit Award, a Satellite Award, and a Sierra Award for her performance.

In 1999, Sevigny appeared in the experimental film Julien Donkey-Boy, which reunited her with writer-director Harmony Korine. In the film, she played the pregnant sister of a man with schizophrenia. Though it never saw a major theatrical release, the film garnered some critical praise; Roger Ebert gave the film his signature thumbs up, referring to it as "Freaks shot by the Blair Witch crew", and continuing to say, "The odds are good that most people will dislike this film and be offended by it. For others, it will provoke sympathy rather than scorn". Sevigny also had a small part in the drama film A Map of the World (1999), which starred Sigourney Weaver. In 2000, Sevigny played a supporting role in Mary Harron's American Psycho, based on the 1991 novel by Bret Easton Ellis. She portrayed the office assistant of the main character Patrick Bateman (Christian Bale), a 1980s Manhattan yuppie-turned-serial killer. Similarly to the novel on which it was based, the film was controversial because of its depiction of graphic violence and sexuality in an upper-class Manhattan society. Sevigny also appeared as a lesbian in the Emmy Award-winning television film If These Walls Could Talk 2 (2000), the sequel to the HBO television drama-film If These Walls Could Talk (1996). Sevigny credited it as the only film she ever made for financial benefit, to help her mother with whom she lived in Connecticut in 1998–2000.

Following her appearance in If These Walls Could Talk 2, Sevigny was approached for a supporting role in the comedy Legally Blonde alongside Reese Witherspoon and offered $500,000; she declined and the role was given to Selma Blair. Instead, she starred in Olivier Assayas' French techno thriller Demonlover (2002) alongside Connie Nielsen, for which she was required to learn her lines in French. Sevigny described shooting the film as "strange", in the sense that Assayas hardly spoke to her during the filming, which she said was difficult because of the lack of "input". After spending nearly three months in France to complete Demonlover, Sevigny returned to New York to film the Club Kids biopic Party Monster (2003). She knew several of the people depicted in the film, including Michael Alig and James St. James, whom she had met during her frequent trips to New York City's club scene as a teenager.

In film, Sevigny had a role in Lars von Trier's parable Dogville (2003), playing one of the various residents of a small mountain town, alongside Nicole Kidman, Lauren Bacall, and Paul Bettany. The film received mixed reactions, and was criticized by Roger Ebert and Richard Roeper as being "anti-American". In 2003, she re-united with former Boys Don't Cry star Peter Sarsgaard for the biographical film Shattered Glass, also alongside Hayden Christensen, about the career of Stephen Glass, a journalist whose reputation is destroyed when his widespread journalistic fraud is exposed. Sevigny played Caitlin Avey, one of Glass' co-editors.

I've done it in everyday life. Everybody's done it, or had it done to them. It was tough, the toughest thing I've ever done, but Vincent was very sensitized to my needs, very gentle. It was one take. It was funny and awkward—we both laughed quite a bit. And we'd been intimate in the past, so it wasn't so weird. If you're not challenging yourself and taking risks, then what's the point of being an artist?

— Sevigny discusses the sex scene in The Brown Bunny

Sevigny played the lead female role in the art house film The Brown Bunny (2003), which details a lonely traveling motorcycle racer reminiscing about his former lover. The film included a scene that involves Sevigny performing unsimulated fellatio - complete with swallowing - on star and director Vincent Gallo, who had been her boyfriend in real life. The film premiered at the Cannes Film Festival and opened to significant controversy and criticism from audiences and critics. Additionally, a promotional billboard erected over Sunset Boulevard, which depicted a censored still from the film's final scene, garnered further attention and criticism. Sevigny defended the film saying, "It's a shame people write so many things when they haven't seen it. When you see the film, it makes more sense. It's an art film. It should be playing in museums. It's like an Andy Warhol movie." In an interview with The Telegraph in 2003, when asked if she regretted the film, she responded stating, "No, I was always committed to the project on the strength of Vincent alone. I have faith in his aesthetic ... I try to forgive and forget, otherwise I'd just become a bitter old lady." Despite the backlash toward the film, some critics praised Sevigny's performance, including Manohla Dargis of The New York Times who wrote, "Actresses have been asked and even bullied into performing similar acts for filmmakers since the movies began, usually behind closed doors. Ms. Sevigny isn't hiding behind anyone's desk. She says her lines with feeling and puts her iconoclasm right out there where everyone can see it; she may be nuts, but she's also unforgettable." Roger Ebert, although critical of The Brown Bunny, nevertheless said that Sevigny brought "a truth and vulnerability" to the film.

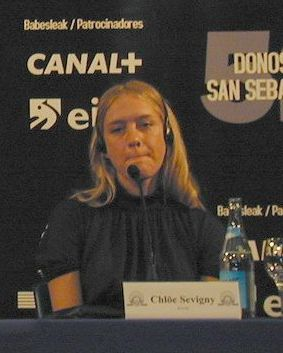
Sevigny at a press conference for Melinda and Melinda (2004).

Sevigny had a major supporting role in Woody Allen's two-sided tragicomedy Melinda and Melinda (2004). Critic Peter Bradshaw described the film as "strange... a half-hearted experiment populated by undernourished lab rats." She guest-starred on the popular television show Will & Grace, and played small roles in Lars von Trier's Manderlay (2005) (a sequel to Dogville (2003)) and in Jim Jarmusch's Broken Flowers (2005). She played one of the several lovers of New York doctor Herman Tarnower in the HBO television film Mrs. Harris (2005) alongside Annette Bening and Ben Kingsley. In 3 Needles (2005), an anthology film about AIDS in various parts of the world, Sevigny had a major role as a Catholic nun visiting Africa. Her performance received good reviews; Dennis Harvey of Variety called her "convincing", while Kevin Thomas of the Los Angeles Times referred to her as "ever-daring and shrewd." In 2006, Sevigny played the lead character in the experimental indie-film Lying (2006) with Jena Malone and Leelee Sobieski, portraying a pathological liar who gathers three female acquaintances for a weekend at her upstate New York country house; the film premiered at the Cannes Film Festival in 2006. She had a starring role in Douglas Buck's 2006 remake of the Brian De Palma horror film Sisters (1973), playing a journalist who witnesses a murder.

=== 2007–2011: Fashion endeavors; Big Love ===
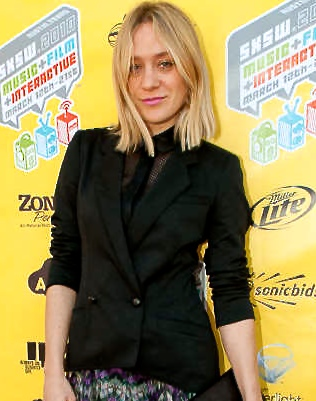
Sevigny at the premiere of Barry Munday (2010) in Austin, Texas

In 2006, Sevigny began a five-season run in the HBO television series Big Love, about a family of fundamentalist Mormon polygamists. She played Nicolette Grant, the conniving, shopaholic daughter of a cult leader and second wife to a polygamist husband, played by Bill Paxton. Sevigny also appeared in her first big-budget production, playing Robert Graysmith's wife Melanie in David Fincher's Zodiac (2007), based on the Zodiac Killer criminal case.

Sevigny returned to films in 2009, starring in the independent psychological thriller The Killing Room, and Werner Herzog's My Son, My Son, What Have Ye Done, a crime horror film based on murderer Mark Yavorsky, produced by David Lynch.

In January 2010, Sevigny won a Golden Globe award for Best Supporting Actress – Series, Miniseries or Television Film for her performance in the third season of Big Love. During a press conference following the award win, Sevigny addressed the repressed women living in the fundamentalist Mormon compounds: "These women are kept extremely repressed. They should be helped. They don't even know who the president of the United States is."

In a later interview with The A.V. Club, Sevigny was asked if she felt that the show's message was that polygamy was "wrong". In response, Sevigny stated: "No, absolutely not. I think there are more parallels to gay rights and alternative lifestyles within Big Love—more so than 'Polygamy is wrong'. I think they actually condone people who decide to live this lifestyle outside of fundamentalist sects." During the same interview, Sevigny stated her disappointment with the series' fourth season, calling it "awful" and "very telenovela"—though she stated that she loves her character and the writing, she felt the show "got away from itself."

Sevigny later regretted making the statements, saying she was very "exhausted" and "wasn't thinking about what [she] was saying"; she also apologized to the show's producers. "[I didn't want them to think] that I was biting the hand that feeds me, because I obviously love the show and have always been nothing but positive about it. And I didn't want anybody to misunderstand me or think that I wasn't, you know, appreciative."

While starring in the fourth season of Big Love in 2010, Sevigny also appeared major roles in two independent comedy films: Barry Munday and Mr. Nice. In Munday, she played the sister of a homely woman who is expecting a child by a recently castrated womanizer (opposite Patrick Wilson and Judy Greer). Her role in Mr. Nice, as the wife of British marijuana-trafficker Howard Marks, had Sevigny starring alongside Rhys Ifans; the film was based on Marks' autobiography of the same name. Sevigny also had a voice part in the documentary film Beautiful Darling (2010), narrating the life of Warhol superstar Candy Darling through Darling's diaries and personal letters. The fifth and final season of Big Love premiered in January 2011.

=== 2012–2015: Television projects ===
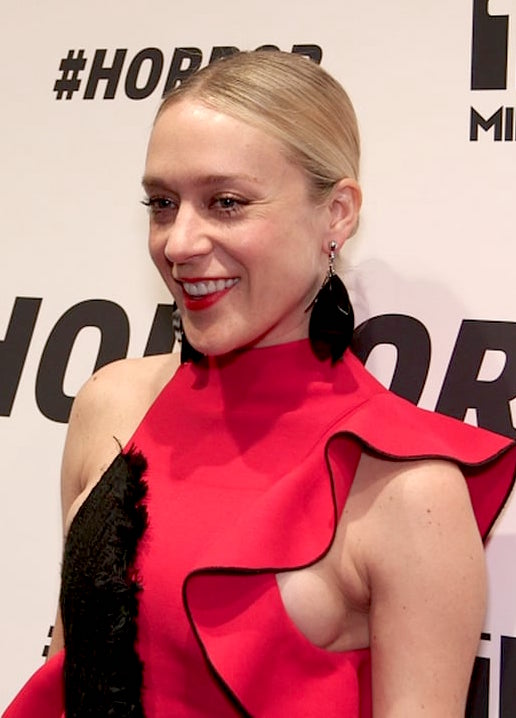
Sevigny in 2015 at the premiere of #Horror

In 2012, Sevigny starred in the British miniseries Hit & Miss, playing a transgender contract killer. Mike Hale of The New York Times wrote of her performance: "Her naturally deep voice is a plus, and her characteristic mix of loucheness and gravity makes sense here, though it's less interesting in this role than it was in the bitterly voracious wife she played in Big Love." The same year, Sevigny guest-starred in an episode of Law & Order: Special Victims Unit, and also appeared in the second and fifth seasons of American Horror Story, which premiered in October 2012 and the latter in October 2015.

Sevigny appeared in a supporting role as a journalist in Lovelace (2013), a biographical film about pornographic film actress Linda Lovelace. The year also saw the release of The Wait (2013), Sevigny's second collaboration with director M. Blash, in which she starred alongside Jena Malone and Luke Grimes. It was a psychological thriller about two sisters who decide to keep their recently deceased mother in their house after receiving a phone call that she will be resurrected. Sevigny also had roles in television, appearing as a satellite character in the third season of the television sketch comedy show Portlandia, and having a 5-episode guest role on the comedy series The Mindy Project, in which she portrayed the ex-wife of the titular Mindy's love interest (played by Chris Messina). Kristi Turnquist of The Oregonian praised Sevigny in Portlandia, stating that she "instantly adds dimension and interest" to the series.

In 2014, Sevigny starred as Catherine Jensen in the crime drama Those Who Kill, which aired on the A&E Network. After being pulled from A&E after two episodes due to low ratings, it was then re-launched on A&E's sister network, Lifetime Movie Network. The series was subsequently cancelled after its 10 episode first season run.

In 2015, Sevigny returned to American Horror Story for its fifth season, Hotel, as a main cast member. Sevigny portrayed a doctor whose son has been kidnapped. That same year, she starred in the Netflix original series Bloodline, and published a picture book chronicling her life, containing photos of her as a high school student, on film sets, personal scripts, and other ephemera. She also appeared in Tara Subkoff's directorial debut #Horror, playing the opulent mother of a teenage girl whose get-together with friends is interrupted by a murderer.

=== 2016–present: Directing and other projects ===
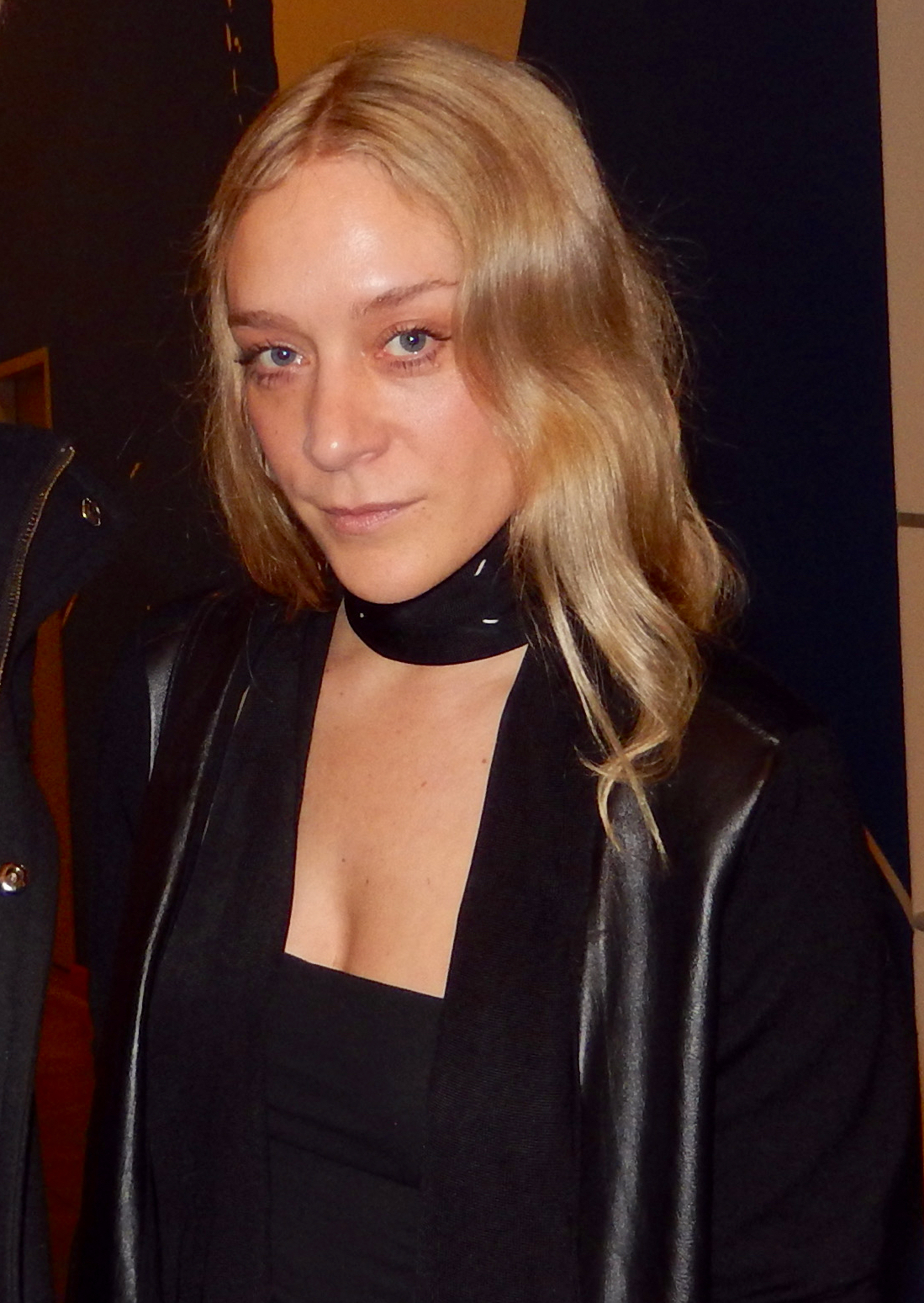
Sevigny in 2017

In early 2016, Sevigny appeared in the Canadian horror film Antibirth opposite Natasha Lyonne, which follows a small-town woman who becomes pregnant through unknown circumstances. Sevigny reunited with The Last Days of Disco director Whit Stillman and fellow actress Kate Beckinsale on Love & Friendship, an adaptation of the Jane Austen novel Lady Susan. Both films premiered at the Sundance Film Festival in January 2016. In 2016 and 2017, respectively, Sevigny also reprised her role in Bloodline, becoming a main cast member in the third and final season.

Sevigny made her directorial debut in 2016 with the short film Kitty, which she adapted from Paul Bowles' 1980 short story. The film was selected to close the 2016 Cannes Film Festival, and was subsequently acquired by The Criterion Collection, which made it available for streaming on their user subscription channel. In late 2016, Sevigny directed her second short film, Carmen, which was shot on location in Portland, Oregon. The film, released as part of a Miu Miu campaign, focuses on comedian Carmen Lynch.

Sevigny played supporting parts in multiple films in 2017. She co-starred as a horse jockey in the drama Lean on Pete, based on the novel by Willy Vlautin; in the ensemble drama Golden Exits; the comedy-drama Beatriz at Dinner, about a Latina massage therapist who is invited to a dinner held by her wealthy employers; the drama The Dinner, concerning a dinner between two couples recounting their children's involvement in a murder; and The Snowman (2017), where she played the twin sisters, one of whom was killed by a serial killer.

Sevigny starred as Lizzie Borden in Lizzie (2018), which premiered at the 2018 Sundance Film Festival, co-starring with Kristen Stewart. Sevigny had first expressed interest in developing and starring in a miniseries based on Borden in 2011. Michael O'Sullivan of The Washington Post wrote that Sevigny "is something of a closed book, delivering a stolid performance that can be read as either strong-willed or stonyhearted." Sevigny also appeared in a supporting role in The True Adventures of Wolfboy, and starred as a small-town police officer facing a zombie apocalypse in Jim Jarmusch's comedy horror film The Dead Don't Die (2019). The latter film premiered as the opening feature at the 2019 Cannes Film Festival, where Sevigny's third short film, White Echo, also competed for the Palme d'Or for Best Short Film.

In 2019 (and 2022), Sevigny appeared in the Netflix show Russian Doll, portraying the mother of the lead character. In 2023, she was a guest star in the Peacock show Poker Face, working again with Natasha Lyonne, star of both series. In 2020, Sevigny starred in We Are Who We Are, a limited series directed by Luca Guadagnino, which premiered in September 2020 on HBO.

In 2024, Sevigny appeared in a Charli XCX music video called "360". In the same year she starred as socialite C. Z. Guest in the Ryan Murphy anthology Feud: Capote vs. The Swans which premiered on FX in January, and in Murphy's Netflix biographical crime drama Monsters: The Lyle and Erik Menendez Story as Kitty Menendez, mother of Lyle and Erik Menendez. Her performance in the lattermost earned her a Primetime Emmy Award nomination for Outstanding Supporting Actress in a Limited or Anthology Series or Movie.

== Other activities ==
=== Fashion design ===
Around 2002, Sevigny began collaborating with friend Tara Subkoff for the Imitation of Christ fashion label and conceptual art project, with their first collection being released in 2003. She served as the creative director for the line, which was referred to as being "more about performance art and cultural theory than clothes".

Sevigny released a clothing collection for Opening Ceremony in the fall of 2009. It included men's, women's, and unisex pieces, and received mixed reactions from critics.

During the 29th International Festival of Fashion and Photography in Hyères in April 2014, Sevigny served as a judge of the fashion jury, chaired by Humberto Leon and Carol Lim.

I think because in real life I'm quite conservative, and I'm not radical in my day-to-day life and how I act, I think I use my art to do that.

— Sevigny in 2014

In 2018 and again in 2022, Sevigny collaborated with eyewear brand Warby Parker on two collections of frames. In 2019, she designed a handbag for Swiss jeweler Chopard.

=== Advertising ===
Throughout her career, Sevigny has modelled for several high-profile designers, including Jimmy Choo (2016, 2025), Loewe (2022), Calvin Klein (2022), Marc Jacobs (2021), Miu Miu (1996, 2012, 2020), JW Anderson (2016), Proenza Schouler (2015, 2023), Louis Vuitton (2004), and Vivienne Westwood (2018). In 2007, she was one of the spokesmodels for French fashion house Chloé's new fragrance. She has also appeared in advertisement campaigns for Japanese fashion retailer Uniqlo (2008), Swedish spirits producer Absolut Vodka (2013), the Apple Watch (2015), Swedish fast fashion brand H&M (2016, 2022), Japanese outerwear label Tatras (2018), German e-commerce company Zalando (2023), American hotel chain W Hotels (2024), Danish shoe manufacturer ECCO (2025), and 7 for All Mankind (2026).

== Legacy and influence ==
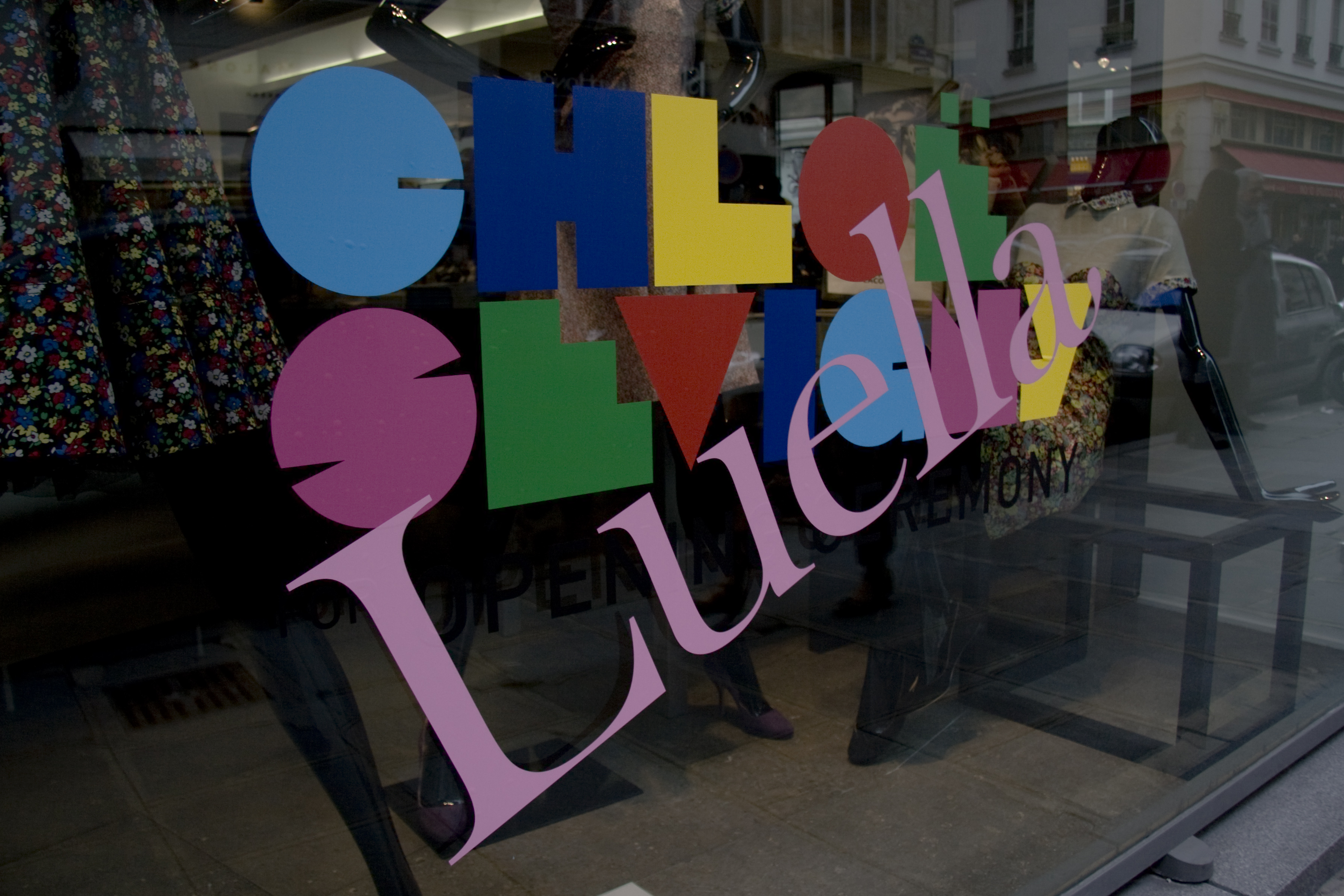
A Colette storefront in Paris, advertising Sevigny's Opening Ceremony collection

Sevigny has long been considered a fashion icon and regularly appears alternately on both best- and worst-dressed lists. (Note: Harper's Bazaar and Style.com among others have favorably ranked Sevigny's clothing choices, while she has alternately been named the "worst-dressed" by other publications.) Commenting on criticisms of her fashion choices, she said in 2015: "I called my great aunt who lives in Florida over Christmas. I hadn't seen her in a while and she said, 'Oh, I never get to see you [in person] but I always see you in the back of US Weekly. They're always making fun of you,' and I was like, 'You know me, I dress crazy.' It makes me feel bad."

Sevigny has worked regularly with stylist Haley Wollens for red carpet appearances and editorial projects, with Vogue writing that "[Sevigny] and stylist Haley Wollens simply never miss." Before her career as an actress, she had achieved fame for her unique style. While her sense of style in the early 1990s reflected only small downtown scenes and trends, it still made a significant impression on high-class fashion chains, which began to emulate Sevigny's look. Her interest in fashion and clothing, as well as her career as a fashion model in her late teenage years and early twenties, led to a career as a prominent and well-respected fashion designer.

She has expressed interest in fashion design throughout the entirety of her career, even dating back to her childhood: "Little House on the Prairie was my favorite show. I would only wear calico print dresses, and I actually slept in one of those little nightcaps!", she told People in 2007. Her unorthodox style, which garnered her initial notoriety in the early '90s, has often been referred to as eclectic. Sevigny has since released several clothing lines designed by herself, both solo and in collaboration, and has earned a title as a modern fashion icon.

In 2023, she held a clothing sale in New York, selling "over 90 percent" of the clothes she had been storing. The proceeds reportedly went to storage and charity. Vogue noted that the success of the sale marked the continuation of Sevigny's "it girl" reputation, though Sevigny had indicated recently that she no longer identified with the label.

Chloë's not afraid to look different and in looking different, she looks very charismatic. No one in LA gets it. Her attitude is foreign to this city. She is so not Fred Segal.

— Fashion historian Cameron Silver describing Sevigny's personal style

Both designers and fashion stylists have extensively written about her fashion and style, which has generally proved favorable. American designer Marc Jacobs wrote of Sevigny in 2001: "The fashion world is fascinated by her. Because not only is she talented, young and attractive, she stands out in a sea of often clichéd looking actresses." In terms of her own personal style, Sevigny cited the Australian film Picnic at Hanging Rock (1975), which features schoolgirls dressed in elaborate Victorian clothing, as a major inspiration; she has also cited it as one of her favorite films.

She has been outspoken in her favoritism of vintage clothing over designer pieces: "I still prefer to buy vintage over spending it all on one designer", she told The Times. "I'll go to Resurrection or Decades and be like, 'Oh, I'm going to buy everything,' but a lot of it is extremely expensive, so I'll go to Wasteland and satisfy that urge and it's not too hard on the pocketbook. Then there's this place called Studio Wardrobe Department where everything is like three dollars".

Actor Drew Droege has, since 2011, performed in a web series titled Chloë, featuring Droege's drag impersonation of Sevigny.

== Personal life ==
In the late 1990s, Sevigny dated British singer Jarvis Cocker. She later said witnessing his experience as a pop star influenced her view of celebrity and career goals:

I remember driving around these remote towns in Wales and kids running after us in the street. I was like, 'This is horrible!' And I saw the effect it had on him, and that's when I decided I never wanted to be a celebrity at that level, and I think that's why I've chosen to do the work that I do and just kind of work with directors that I love and try and do work that means something to me.

Around 2000, Sevigny began a relationship with musician Matt McAuley of the band A.R.E. Weapons. They were a couple for eight years before separating in early 2008. Sevigny began dating Croatian art gallery director Siniša Mačković in 2018. They married on March 9, 2020, and on May 2, 2020, she gave birth to a son.

Sevigny endorsed Senator Bernie Sanders for President in the 2016 US presidential election and again in the 2020 election.

In 2019, Sevigny and Natasha Lyonne helped organize a crowdfund to restore the 1980 film Out of the Blue from its original elements. Both actresses have cited the film as an influence.

She is a practicing Catholic and attends mass.

== See also ==
- List of American film actresses
- List of American television actresses
- List of actors with Academy Award nominations
- List of Golden Globe winners

== Sources ==
- Egan, Kate; Thomas, Sarah (2012). Cult Film Stardom: Offbeat Attractions and Processes of Cultification. Palgrave MacMillan. ISBN 978-0-230-29369-4. Archived from the original on January 27, 2022.
- Frey, Mattias (2016). Extreme Cinema: The Transgressive Rhetoric of Today's Art Film Culture. Rutgers University Press. ISBN 978-0-8135-7649-7.
- Craddock, Jim, ed. (2000). Video Hound's Golden Movie Retriever: The Complete Guide to Movies on Videocassette, DVD, and Laserdisc. Detroit: Gale. ISBN 978-1-57859-120-6.
- Kennedy, Alicia; Stoehrer, Emily Banis; Calderin, Jay (2013). Fashion Design, Referenced: A Visual Guide to the History, Language, and Practice of Fashion. Rockport Publishers. ISBN 978-1-59253-677-1. Alt URL
- Monush, Barry; Willis, John (2006). Screen World Film Annual. Vol. 57. Applause Theatre & Cinema Books. ISBN 978-1-55783-706-6.
