= Douglas Buck =

American film director

Douglas Buck is an American film director.

Buck grew up on Long Island, in New York State. He later moved to New York City, where he began making films while working as an airport electrical engineer.

Buck started by making short films, including Cutting Moments (1997), Home (1998), and Prologue (2003), all three of which were collected together in the Family Portraits anthology. Rue Morgue magazine selected Cutting Moments as one of its "100 Alternative Horror Films". In 2004 he began making a new version of Brian De Palma's 1973 film Sisters starring Lou Doillon, Stephen Rea and Chloë Sevigny, which was released in 2007, and described by Variety as "a worthy partner to his predecessor's famously violent slasher thriller". In 2008 Buck was reported to be working on an eco-horror film titled The Broken Imago, which he stated was influenced by the 1976 Spanish film Quién puede matar a un niño. While a short proof-of-concept piece was produced, the feature film was not.

Buck also co-wrote the 1999 film Terror Firmer.

== Filmography ==
Feature films

- Family Portraits: A Trilogy of America (2003) [anthology]
- Sisters (2006)

Short films

- After All (1994)
- Cutting Moments (1997) [included in Family Portraits: A Trilogy of America]
- Home (1998) [included in Family Portraits: A Trilogy of America]
- Prologue (2003) [featurette; included in Family Portraits: A Trilogy of America]
- The Broken Imago (2008) [proof-of-concept]
- The Aristofrogs (2010) [contributing director]
- The Accident (2011) [segment from The Theatre Bizarre]
