= X-Large (clothing brand) =

American clothing brand

X-Large is an American streetwear brand and clothing store based in Los Angeles, California. It was founded by Eli Bonerz and Adam Silverman in 1991, based on an idea from Mike D. Since then, the company has expanded the business in New York City, Tokyo, Seattle, and Toronto, among others.

The sister brand X-Girl was founded by Kim Gordon and Daisy von Furth. Sofia Coppola and Spike Jonze produced X-Girl's first fashion show, which was held out on the streets of SoHo, Manhattan in 1994. Chloë Sevigny, who walked for X-Girl's first fashion show, became the face of the brand. In 1998, X-Girl was sold to the Japanese company B's International.
