= Cutting Moments =

- Cutting Moments VHS cover
- Directed by: Douglas Buck
- Written by: Douglas Buck
- Produced by: Douglas Buck
- Starring: Nica Ray; Gary Betsworth; Jared Barsky
- Cinematography: Nicola Saraval
- Music by: William DiMartino
- Release date: November 8, 1997
- Running time: 29 minutes
- Country: United States
- Language: English

Cutting Moments is a 1997 short film written, produced, and directed by Douglas Buck, in cooperation with The New School. The film was first released on a VHS compilation also called "Cutting Moments" before being re-released in August 2004 as part of Buck's suburban holocaust collection Family Portraits: A Trilogy of America.

== Plot ==
In the center of a uniform, monotonous subdivision, married couple Sarah and Patrick have been living with their emotions kept isolated between themselves and their son, Joey. Patrick seems to be cold and harsh by ignoring Sarah's existence, and the affection Patrick once had for her has all but disappeared. It comes to the point that his sexual urges are manifested in his actions toward Joey. In one scene, Joey is playing outside and places two Power Rangers toys in a suggestive position on the ground. Sarah is left in bewilderment when she hears the discussion between her husband and son later that evening.

At the dinner table, Sarah tells Patrick that she had a conversation with a lawyer over the phone, and it is likely that Joey will soon be taken away. Patrick responds by saying, "It will all work out." The next morning, in an attempt to get Patrick to notice her, Sarah applies make-up and dons a seductive red dress. When Patrick shows disinterest and disdain towards his wife (by ignoring her and continuing to watch TV), Sarah goes to the bathroom and removes her lipstick. Thinking that something is still on her lips, she begins to repeatedly scrub them with a scouring pad until they are scratched and bloody. She then cuts off her lips with a pair of scissors, which leads to Patrick showing renewed interest in their relationship. The two then have tearful, bloody sex, which culminates with Patrick using hedge trimmers to sever his wife's breast and his own penis, with both promptly dying of blood loss. The following morning, police arrive and find their bodies, though Joey is uninjured and taken to safety by a CPS social worker.

== Cast ==
- Nica Ray as Sarah
- Gary Betsworth as Patrick
- Jared Barsky as Joey

== Recognition ==
Anita Gates of The New York Times wrote of the film "scenes are almost unwatchable but have a curious, grotesque power", and of Buck's work, "There is a sober intelligence behind his low-budget gore, but its shrill excess drowns out the ring of truth". Brian Bertoldo of Film Threat wrote that the film "brings the viewer into a nightmare of insanity and mutilation as a married couple come apart at the seams", and noting that while real suburbia horror is almost too common to be a horror theme, "What does work is the gory execution, that's not something you'll see on the 11 o'clock news."

=== Awards and nominations ===
- 1997, 3rd place in Best Short Film, Fant-Asia Film Festival
- 1998, Nomination for an International Horror Guild Award
