= Demonlover =

2002 film by Olivier Assayas

- Original promotional poster
- Directed by: Olivier Assayas
- Written by: Olivier Assayas
- Produced by: Xavier Giannoli
- Starring: Connie Nielsen; Charles Berling; Chloë Sevigny; Gina Gershon
- Cinematography: Denis Lenoir
- Edited by: Luc Barnier
- Music by: Sonic Youth
- Production company: Elizabeth Films
- Distributed by: SND Films
- Release dates: 19 May 2002 (Cannes); 6 November 2002 (France)
- Running time: 115 minutes
- Country: France
- Languages: French; English; Japanese
- Budget: $8 million
- Box office: $462,976

Demonlover is a 2002 French neo-noir thriller film written and directed by Olivier Assayas, and starring Connie Nielsen, Charles Berling, Chloë Sevigny, and Gina Gershon. The plot focuses on the entanglement between various corporations vying for the financial control of an interactive 3-D hentai company, resulting in a power struggle that culminates in violence and espionage.

It features a musical score by American rock band Sonic Youth. It premiered at the 2002 Cannes Film Festival, although it was more widely released several months later.

The film contains various themes, including desensitization to violence and the problematic nature of globalization. The film was distributed in the United States by Palm Pictures, who released it theatrically in its original unrated version. Palm Pictures released it on DVD in 2004 in both R-rated and unrated director's cut versions.

The film is primarily in French, with some scenes in English and Japanese. It is considered an example of New French Extremity by some journalists. In recent years the film has gained a cult following.

== Plot ==
Diane de Monx is an executive trying to negotiate a deal to acquire the rights to the productions of a Japanese anime studio, which will soon include three-dimensional hentai, for the French-based Volf Corporation. To facilitate the acquisition, she debilitates her superior, Karen, and assumes control of her portfolio, her business partner Hervé, and her assistant Elise. Elise, however, despises Diane and works to frustrate her negotiations at every opportunity. Diane and Hervé travel to Tokyo to close the deal, and they enjoy a sexual flirtation.

Having acquired the rights, the Volf Corporation attempts to enter into a deal for distribution with an American Internet company called Demonlover, represented by Elaine Si Gibril. Diane, however, has actually been a spy all along for Demonlover's main competition, Mangatronics, meeting with a mysterious handler on occasion to pass along information on the Demonlover deal. Meanwhile, Diane discovers that Elaine's company is a front for a website called the Hellfire Club, an interactive torture site on the dark web that broadcasts extreme sadomasochism in real-time. When confronted with these charges, Demonlover praises Hellfire Club but claims no ties to it whatsoever.

In order to seal the deal for Mangatronics, Diane is sent by her handler to steal data from the computer in Elaine's hotel room. Before Diane can download the information, Elaine enters the hotel room and notices Diane's presence. A violent struggle ensues, and Diane slashes Elaine's throat with a piece of broken glass before suffocating her with a pillow in a supply closet outside the room. Elaine briefly regains consciousness and bludgeons Diane, before dying due to blood loss. When Diane awakens, she is in Elaine's hotel room, and everything is completely cleaned up. There is no evidence of a murder, burglary, or struggle.

Diane subsequently meets with Elise, whom she drives home during a rainstorm. In conversation, Elise implies that Diane should be scared for her life before demanding to be dropped off on the side of the street. Returning to the Volf offices alone, Diane manages to log onto the Hellfire Club website, which displays disturbing footage and images of women being sexually tortured. Karen arrives at the office, and also gives Diane an ominous warning, confirming that Demonlover does indeed own and operate the Hellfire Club website. Karen leaves behind a camcorder tape for Diane to view, which shows Elise and several men cleaning up the crime scene from Elaine's murder, as well as carrying an unconscious Diane back to her room. Diane gleans that Elise is in fact an agent for Demonlover, working under Hervé, who is also a covert associate.

Demonlover uses Diane's murder of Elaine as blackmail against her, forcing Diane to acquiesce and become part of the Hellfire Club. Elise escorts Diane to a mansion in the country, where she drugs her. Through flashbacks, it is revealed that Diane also murdered Hervé as he was sexually assaulting her for a second time. Some time later, Diane and Elise are flown by helicopter to a desert locale, where Diane again loses consciousness. When she awakens, she finds herself in a dungeonlike room, on a mattress, dressed in a vinyl suit and with a wig. Beside the mattress there are pictures of Diana Rigg as Mrs. Peel in The Avengers. Diane attempts to escape, and is almost successful. However, upon driving her getaway car she is involved in a car accident. The escape fails.

Some time later, in the United States, a teenage boy logs onto the Hellfire Club with his father's credit card. He then fills out a detailed fantasy of what he would like done to the woman on the screen, who turns out to be Diane, bound and wearing a bondage suit. The boy allows his fantasy to play in the background as he completes his science homework, while Diane stares helplessly at the camera from her chamber.

== Cast ==
- Connie Nielsen as Diane de Monx
- Charles Berling as Hervé Le Millinec
- Chloë Sevigny as Elise Lipsky
- Dominique Reymond as Karen
- Jean-Baptiste Malartre as Henri-Pierre Volf
- Gina Gershon as Elaine Si Gibril
- Edwin Gerard as Edward Gomez
- Thomas M. Pollard as Avocat américain
- Abi Sakamoto as Kaori—la traductrice
- Naoko Yamazaki as Eiko
- Nao Omori as Shoji (as Nao Ohmori)
- Jean-Pierre Gos as Verkamp—Contact Diane
- Julie Brochen as Gina—Amie de Diane
- Randall Holden as Ray
- Alexandre Lachaux as Erwan—Broker #1

== Analysis ==
One of the themes of the film is the desensitization to violent or disturbing imagery, both real and simulated, in the modern viewer. Writer Rosanna Maule describes the film as one preoccupied with the over-saturation of digital media culture and globalization, and the roles they play in the "formation of the economic, ideological, and social." Upon its premiere at the Cannes Film Festival, Demonlover was noted for the disintegrated nature of its final act, which has been described by critic Jonathan Romney as "fall[ing] into an apparent lapse of incoherence." Romney characterizes the film as one made in "the catastrophic mode," exploring a post-capitalist 'société de spectacle' (lit. "society of spectacle"), "grown out of a generalised contamination and formatting of reality that leaves no apparent means of escape." Critic Thierry Jousse similarly wrote that this quality of the film exhibits "the vertigo of sameness... a no man's land of time changes, of diffused projections, of mental images, of tricky perspectives, of disconnected spaces of ghostly gaps."

== Production ==
=== Development ===
Writer-director Olivier Assayas was inspired to make the film based on the writings and experimental films of Guy Debord, which denounced the damaging effects of media on social and interpersonal relations.

=== Casting ===
Connie Nielsen accepted the lead role of Diane after reading the screenplay, commenting: "I felt something about Diane from the moment I read the script. She's removed and very lonely. I think she mirrors the general loneliness that people feel in a cutthroat environment." At the time, Nielsen had recently completed the big-budget historical drama Gladiator (2000), but was impressed enough by the screenplay that she agreed to star: "I've always done big and small movies. As long as I feel something in my heart when I read it, it really doesn't matter to me."

Chloë Sevigny agreed to star in the film as she was an admirer of Assayas's film Irma Vep: "I just wanted to work with a filmmaker who I found fascinating, who was making intriguing work. I met with him in Paris and read the script and signed on." Sevigny had previously been offered the role of Vivian Kensington (a role that eventually went to Selma Blair) in the comedy film Legally Blonde (2001), but opted to star in Demonlover instead. Sevigny was required to learn to speak French for her role of Elise, an American who speaks both French and English, and learned the phonetics and enunciations despite not understanding the language.

Assayas stated he initially did not intend to cast any American or English-speaking actresses in the film, though both Sevigny and Gershon—both Americans—were ultimately cast in major roles. "I've always been a fan of Hollywood cinema," Assayas commented, "including mainstream films that many people disdain. The characters are sometimes simplistic, but there are often strong dramatic elements that I admire. What amused me in writing Demonlover was trying to include some of those aspects of American cinema."

=== Filming ===
Principal photography of Demonlover took place in the fall of 2001, primarily in Paris and Tokyo, on a budget of approximately US$8 million. Additional filming took place in Mexico.

=== Soundtrack ===
The film's soundtrack album features eight tracks by the band Sonic Youth, as well as songs by Goldfrapp, Death in Vegas, Dub Squad, and Soulfly. It was released in 2002.

| No. | Title | Artist | Length |
|---|---|---|---|
| 1. | "Move Away" | Sonic Youth | 4:38 |
| 2. | "Control Freak" | Sonic Youth | 3:32 |
| 3. | "Safe In Hell" | Sonic Youth | 4:07 |
| 4. | "Electric Noisefield" | Sonic Youth | 4:15 |
| 5. | "Slambient Desire" | Sonic Youth | 1:50 |
| 6. | "Melodikim" | Sonic Youth | 3:01 |
| 7. | "Teknikal Illprovisation" | Sonic Youth | 7:49 |
| 8. | "Superdead" | Sonic Youth | 8:34 |
| 9. | "Lovely Head" | Goldfrapp | 3:47 |
| 10. | "Dirge" | Death in Vegas | 5:43 |
| 11. | "Hedgehoppers" | Dub Squad | 2:29 |
| 12. | "Back to the Primitive" | Soulfly | 4:21 |

== Release ==
Demonlover premiered at the 2002 Cannes Film Festival. It was subsequently released theatrically in France on 6 November 2002, and in the United States on 19 September 2003 by Palm Pictures, premiering in Los Angeles in its original unrated cut. It opened in Boston the following week, 26 September 2003. The film grossed $462,976 internationally.

=== Critical response ===
Reviews were mixed. Rotten Tomatoes reports a 52% approval rating based on 84 reviews, with a weighted average of 5.6/10. The site's consensus describes the film as "A stylish but convoluted mess without any sympathetic characters". Metacritic gives the film a score of 67 out of 100 based on 28 critics, indicating "Generally favorable reviews".

Roger Ebert of the Chicago Sun-Times gave a rated the film two stars out of four, summarizing: "There's an ironic twist, but the movie hadn't paid for it and didn't deserve it... No one seems to question the fact that they all play to make money by torturing people. It's all just business. As a metaphor for certain tendencies in modern commerce, this may be intended, but somehow I don't think so. I think Demonlover is so in love with its visuals and cockeyed plot that it forgets to think about the implications." Owen Gleiberman of Entertainment Weekly wrote of the film: "For an hour or so, Demonlover is an entrancingly devious soap opera of executive decadence. When Gina Gershon shows up, playing an American entrepreneur who may or may not be linked to a website that features forbidden sexual torture, her hostile lubriciousness only thickens the atmosphere of cutthroat desire... The movie morphs into a 'dream,' all right, but I confess that all I wanted to do was wake up from it and return to the slithery intrigue of corporate depravity."

Writing for the Los Angeles Times, Manohla Dargis praised the film as "gorgeous, exasperating [and] irresistible," praising the film's "intricately plotted screenplay," which she described as a mixture of Restoration drama, pulp and speculative fiction at a "break-neck speed." The Chicago Tribune's Michael Wilmington gave the film a favorable review and praised its themes, noting: "The film is best enjoyed from a detached perspective, one which allows you to pick out political and cinematic ironies among the stylized thriller conventions. Unlike almost every other sexy modern thriller—especially most recent studio blockbusters—this one gives you a lot to think about."

In a 2021 retrospective review, J. Hoberman of The New York Times wrote: "The movie struck many as annoyingly trendy when it premiered at Cannes in 2002. Nearly two decades later, its Everything-is-Now pyrotechnics have aged well, although it is hard to ignore the flip-top phones."

=== Home media ===
Palm Pictures released the film on DVD in North America on 16 March 2004, first in a 115-minute truncated R-rated version of the film, which eliminates some of the explicit sexuality, as well as pixellating some of the hentai footage shown in the film. Palm Pictures subsequently issued a two-disc unrated director's cut DVD on 14 September 2004, which runs 117 minutes. This unrated version was released on Region 4 DVD with an R18+ rating and later aired on Australian television with the equivalent AV15+ rating. As a bonus feature on the two-disc edition, a secret code (found in the text printed on the DVD itself) can be entered to gain access to the unedited Hellfire Club footage.

Arrow Films released a 2K-restored special edition Blu-ray of the film in 2019 through their Arrow Academy line, available in the United Kingdom. In December 2020, Janus Films announced they would be screening a newly restored print of the film in February 2021, pending a DVD and Blu-ray release through the Criterion Collection. This newly-restored print was made available for streaming via the Film at Lincoln Center in February 2021.

== Sources ==
- Beugnet, Martine (2007). Cinema and Sensation: French Film and the Art of Transgression. Carbondale, Illinois: SIU Press. ISBN 978-0-809-32856-7.
- Maule, Rosanna (2008). Beyond Auteurism: New Directions in Authorial Film Practices in France, Italy and Spain Since the 1980s. Chicago, Illinois: Intellect Books. ISBN 978-1-841-50204-5.
