= Kitty (2016 film) =

- Film poster
- Directed by: Chloë Sevigny
- Written by: Chloë Sevigny
- Based on: "Kitty" by Paul Bowles
- Produced by: Lizzie Nastro; Christina Piovesan
- Starring: Edie Yvonne; Ione Skye; Lee Meriwether
- Cinematography: Seamus McGarvey
- Edited by: Sophie Corra
- Production company: First Generation Films
- Distributed by: Refinery29
- Release date: May 20, 2016 (Cannes)
- Running time: 15 minutes
- Country: United States
- Language: English

Kitty is a 2016 American short fantasy-drama film directed and written by Chloë Sevigny, based on the short story of same name by Paul Bowles. The film stars Ione Skye, Lee Meriwether, and Edie Yvonne. It was screened in the Critics' Week section at the 2016 Cannes Film Festival.

== Plot ==
Kitty, a little girl, asks her mother why she is named Kitty. Her mother informs her her name is actually Catherine and that Kitty is a nickname.

One day, looking in the mirror, Kitty notices she has grown whiskers. She points them out to her mother, but her mother ignores her. Kitty grows pointed ears and grey fur but none of the adults in her life seem to notice. Waking up one morning with talons Kitty goes downstairs and is mesmerized by some birds she sees. Fully transforming into a grey tabby, she chases the birds and then goes to visit her neighbour who feeds her milk. Returning home, she is locked out and sees her parents clutching her discarded nightgown, believing she has been kidnapped.

Kitty as a cat continues to visit her parents every day hoping they recognize her, but is always locked out. One day she finds her mother in the garden and rubs against her legs and then jumps into her lap. Her mother calls her a pretty pussycat and carries Kitty as a cat into the family home.

== Cast ==
- Ione Skye as Mother
- Lee Meriwether as Mrs. Tinsley
- Edie Yvonne as Kitty

== Production ==
Principal photography on the film began on January 8, 2016, in Los Angeles in the suburb of Van Nuys. and concluded on January 12, 2016. Chloë Sevigny would be making her directorial debut, which would be produced by Lizzie Nastro and Christina Piovesan through First Generation Films. The crew included cinematographer Seamus McGarvey, costume designer Jennifer Johnson, production designer Chilly Nathan, and casting director Laray Mayfield.

== Release ==
In January 2016, Refinery29 acquired distribution rights to the film as part of its ShatterBox Anthology, a short-film series dedicated to emerging female filmmakers. The film had its world premiere at the 2016 Cannes Film Festival in the Critics' Week section.
