= Hit & Miss =

British television series

- Genre: Drama
- Created by: Paul Abbott
- Written by: Sean Conway
- Directed by: Hettie MacDonald; Sheree Folkson
- Starring: Chloë Sevigny; Peter Wight; Jonas Armstrong; Vincent Regan; Ben Crompton; Karla Crome; Reece Noi; Jorden Bennie; Roma Christensen
- Composer: Dickon Hinchliffe
- Country of origin: United Kingdom
- Original language: English
- No. of series: 1
- No. of episodes: 6 (list of episodes)

Production
- Executive producers: Huw Kennair-Jones; Paul Abbott; Nicola Shindler
- Producer: Juliet Charlesworth
- Cinematography: David Luther
- Editors: Celia Haining; Joe Randall-Cutler
- Running time: 43–45 minutes
- Production companies: AbbottVision; Red Production Company

Original release
- Network: Sky Atlantic
- Release: 22 May – 26 June 2012

Hit & Miss is a British television series, created by Paul Abbott, broadcast on Sky Atlantic. It stars Chloë Sevigny as a transgender contract killer who discovers she has a child with her former lover. She struggles between caring for her newfound family and maintaining her job as an assassin.

The show was conceived by Abbott as a combination of two ideas for separate TV series. All six episodes were scripted by Sean Conway. The series is Sky Atlantic's first original drama commission. It premiered on 22 May 2012, in the United Kingdom. In the United States, it premiered on DirecTV's Audience Network on 11 July 2012.

On 4 September 2012, the website TVWise published a rumour that Sky Atlantic had cancelled Hit & Miss. Sky Atlantic later contacted TVWise and stated that Hit & Miss was commissioned as a self-contained drama, implying that renewal was never an option.

== Overview ==
Mia, a pre-operative transgender woman, works as a contract killer. She discovers that she has fathered a son, Ryan, with her ex-girlfriend Wendy, who recently has died from cancer. Mia is named by the mother as guardian of the boy and his three half-siblings, who live in a rural farmhouse in Yorkshire. While continuing to work as an assassin, Mia learns to cope with being a parent.

== Cast and characters ==
- Chloë Sevigny as Mia – a transgender woman and contract killer: After the death of her former girlfriend Wendy, she learns that they have a son.
- Peter Wight as Eddie – Mia's boss, a professional criminal in Manchester: He regards Mia as a top employee.
- Jonas Armstrong as Ben – a romantic interest of Mia's
- Vincent Regan as John – owner of the smallholding where the family lives
- Ben Crompton as Liam – brother of Wendy
- Karla Crome as Riley – Wendy's daughter, Mia's s adopted daughter
- Reece Noi as Levi – Wendy's son, Mia's adopted son
- Jorden Bennie as Ryan – Wendy and Mia's son
- Roma Christensen as Leonie – Wendy's daughter, Mia's adopted daughter

== Production ==
Hit & Miss was commissioned as one of Sky Atlantic's first original series when the channel was launched in February 2011. Series creator Paul Abbott said the show combined separate ideas for "two series that shouldn't automatically fit together". He said there were two projects on his desk: one about a transsexual mother of five, which he had previously tackled in Mrs In-Betweeny, the other about a hitman. He was having difficulty developing the first one because "the penis became an obstructive prop – it seemed that was all there was to talk about." Instead, he decided to combine both. Abbott passed on the idea to writer Sean Conway, whose research for the series involved "strange Google lists detailing sex changes and hand guns". Abbott expected Sky Atlantic to resist commissioning the series, but was surprised at the channel's open-mindedness.

Sevigny's agents sent her the script for her to consider in 2011 and she took up the offer right away. While she was impressed by the script, she was also worried about the reaction from the transgender community. Executive producer Nicola Shindler said a transgender actor was considered for the role, but "in the end we wanted the best actor."

To prepare for her role, Sevigny read medical notes about surgical procedures and hormone treatments, and read autobiographies of people who had transitioned, while also perfecting an Irish accent (Sevigny is American). She had to wear a prosthetic penis, something which made her uncomfortable: "I cried every time they put it on me. I’ve always been very comfortable being a girl, so it was hard to wrap my head around the fact that someone could feel so uncomfortable in their own skin."

The series was filmed in Manchester. Sevigny compared the experience to "making a small, low-budget, independent film for five months, which can be trying." Some scenes contain full-frontal nudity by Sevigny (with prosthetic male genitalia) that were regarded as non-gratuitous and integral to the storyline.

According to Conway prior to the premiere of the first series, Sky Atlantic "seemed keen" on commissioning a second series of the show. As of 5 July 2012, no decision has been made on the future of the show. Sevigny mentioned in an interview "The other actors were all optioned for another season. I was the only one who wasn't, oddly. I guess they knew they wouldn't be able to get me if I had to sign on for several seasons... I'd want to see what they would do with the story [in season two], where the characters would go. I really enjoyed playing the character."

On September 4, 2012, it was reported that Sky Atlantic had cancelled Hit & Miss, with Sky Atlantic claiming that, contrary to other reports which cite Sevigny and Conway talking about a possible second season, Hit & Miss was always conceived of as a "self contained drama."

== Episodes ==
No.	Title	Directed by	Written by	Original release date	UK viewers (millions)
1	"Episode One"	Hettie Macdonald	Sean Conway	22 May 2012	0.374
Mia is informed that she fathered an 11-year-old son with her former lover Wendy who dies of cancer. She is named guardian to the boy and Wendy's other children. She meets them at their smallholding and tries to take on a parental role but is greeted with hostility. She also doesn't get on well with the landlord John and assaults him when he arrives to collect rent.
2	"Episode Two"	Hettie Macdonald	Sean Conway	29 May 2012	0.360
John gives the family a month's notice to move out of his land and refuses Mia's offer to buy it. Mia's boss Eddie offers to take the house under his name (allowing her to stay under the radar). Mia grows closer to Ben.
3	"Episode Three"	Hettie Macdonald	Sean Conway	5 June 2012	0.317
Mia forces John to sell the property at gunpoint. During a kill assignment, Mia is seriously injured when a car knocks her down. She wakes in a hospital and is barely able to drive home. She reveals to Ben that she is transgender and he reacts negatively. Riley, who has been having a sexual relationship with John, reveals she is pregnant. John insists she get an abortion. Ben apologizes and reconciles with Mia.
4	"Episode Four"	Sheree Folkson	Sean Conway	12 June 2012	0.333
Ben is confused about his relationship with Mia. Leonie is momentarily abducted by Wendy's brother Liam, but the family begins to accept him as their own. John confronts Riley about the baby and nearly strangles her to death before she uses Mia's gun to kill him.
5	"Episode Five"	Sheree Folkson	Sean Conway	19 June 2012	0.335
Mia and Eddie chop up John's body and dispose of the pieces. Riley is disturbed by the ordeal. Eddie hands Mia an important job. Mia and Ben finally have sex but she is heartbroken to find that he was sleeping with someone else. A part of John's body is discovered by some children by the lake.
6	"Episode Six"	Sheree Folkson	Sean Conway	26 June 2012	0.393
Mia meets her mother at a fair but is attacked by her brother. She disappears but is later traced by Ben and Ryan with help from Eddie. She convinces her mother to accept her as a woman and invites her to live with the family. Liam takes the fall for John's murder. On a kill assignment, Mia misses the target. This puts Eddie in trouble, and he is forced to kill Mia or be killed. Meanwhile, Ben confesses his love to Mia. Eddie arrives at the farmhouse but before he can shoot Mia, Ryan points a gun at him.

== Broadcast ==
Hit & Miss premiered in the United Kingdom on 22 May 2012 on Sky Atlantic. The first series averaged 120,000 live viewers (0.68% share). In the United States, it premiered on DirecTV's Audience Network on 11 July 2012. The series is being broadcast on ABC2 in Australia as of 5 November 2012.

== Reception ==
The series has received good reviews, with most praise directed at Sevigny's performance.

The show holds a Metacritic score of 72/100, based on 16 reviews.

Tom Sutcliffe of The Independent gave a favourable review of the premiere episode, calling it "wonderfully unexpected and unpredictable and a debut commission in original drama that Sky Atlantic has every reason to be proud of." The Observer's Phil Hogan said the episode has "one or two cliches of the genre but it was well shot, scripted and acted, and didn't take all day skating around the point." Metro's Keith Watson's review was mixed, saying the central story has an "oddball allure" but the show "needed a subtler hand on the surreal humour rudder to pull it off." Chris Harvey of the Telegraph was critical of the episode's improbable premise but gave it a 3/5 rating.

Robert Lloyd of the Los Angeles Times gave a positive review, saying that "every performance here is good — the young actors are remarkable — and though the script sometimes goes just where you would expect it to, the characters seem authentically unpredictable." The Seattle Post-Intelligencer's Matt Roush was equally favourable saying "the fun is just beginning, and I can't wait to see where this twisted but strangely affecting story goes next." In contrast, The New York Times faulted the show saying "The problem with Mr. Abbott’s new show ... isn’t the premise but the solemnity with which it’s approached... “Hit & Miss” is so slow and earnest and teachy — several scenes involve Mia's young son exploring his own sexual and gender identity by donning a dress and headband — that much of the show seems to be performed on tiptoe, and a giggle seems like the appropriate response."

== Awards and nominations ==
Year	Association	Category	Nominee(s)	Result
2012	Satellite Awards	Best Actress – Television Series Drama	Chloe Sevigny	Nominated
2013	BAFTA TV Awards	Best Director – Fiction	Hettie Macdonald	Nominated
2013	GLAAD Media Awards	Outstanding Television Movie or Miniseries	Hit & Miss	Nominated

== Home releases ==
Series	Episodes	DVD/Blu-ray release date		
Series	Episodes	Region 1	Region 2	Region 4
1	6	5 March 2013	2 July 2012	12 December 2012
