= Sisters (2006 film) =

- Official theatrical poster
- Directed by: Douglas Buck
- Written by: Douglas Buck; John Freitas
- Produced by: Edward R. Pressman
- Starring: Stephen Rea; Lou Doillon; Chloë Sevigny; Dallas Roberts; JR Bourne
- Cinematography: John J. Campbell
- Edited by: Omar Daher
- Music by: Edward Dzubak; David Kristian
- Production companies: Edward R. Pressman Film; No Remorse Pictures
- Distributed by: Image Entertainment
- Release dates: October 13, 2006 (Sitges Film Festival); March 11, 2008 (U.S.)
- Running time: 92 minutes
- Country: United States
- Language: English
- Budget: $5 million

Sisters is a 2006 American psychological horror film directed by Douglas Buck and starring Stephen Rea, Lou Doillon, and Chloë Sevigny, with Dallas Roberts and JR Bourne playing supporting characters. A remake of the 1972 Brian De Palma film of the same name, it follows a journalist who becomes embroiled in a criminal investigation after witnessing a woman's disturbed twin sister commit a violent murder.

Principal photography of Sisters took place largely in Vancouver in the spring of 2006. The film premiered at the Sitges Film Festival on October 13, 2006, with subsequent screenings at several film festivals in late 2006 and 2007, including South by Southwest. In the United States, the film was released directly to DVD by Image Entertainment.

== Plot ==
Developmental psychologist Dr. Philip Lacan performs as a magician at a children's party at the Zurvan Institute, a clinical psychology hospital outside Vancouver. Angelique, a Frenchwoman who is one of his former patients and ex-wife, performs as Philip's assistant. Grace Collier, an undercover journalist investigating claims of malpractice against Philip, is exposed at the party and thrown out, an event witnessed by physician Dylan Wallace, who has volunteered at the event.

Dylan gives Angelique a ride back to her apartment in the city, where she resides with her twin sister, Annabel, who remains unseen in a closed bedroom. Angelique reveals that the following day is her and her sister's birthday. After Dylan and Angelique have a one-night stand, Dylan goes to purchase a birthday cake in the morning. Meanwhile, a suspicious Grace, who spent the night parked outside Philip's apartment across the street, breaks in and begins investigating his office. From Philip's computer, Grace witnesses a disheveled Annabel brutally stab Dylan with knitting needles when he returns via live security footage from inside the twins' apartment. After calling police, Grace evades Philip, who briefly returns to retrieve his cell phone, before glimpsing a bloodied Dylan reaching out of Angelique's apartment window across the street.

Philip enters Angelique's apartment, where she claims she fell asleep, during which Annabel murdered Dylan. Grace leads police to Angelique's apartment but they find no evidence of a crime, as Philip has hidden Dylan's corpse behind a television set. A self-assured Grace later meets with her friend, Larry, who agrees to break into Angelique's apartment to search for evidence. Meanwhile, Grace encounters Angelique in the park, where she notices track marks on her arm, and suspects Philip is experimenting on Angelique with a novel psychotropic drug.

Larry finds Dylan's corpse inside Angelique's apartment, which he reports to Grace. He also gives Grace a cassette tape he discovered inside a dresser drawer. Grace listens to the tape in her car, finding it to be a recorded therapy session between Philip and Angelique and Annabel's mother, Sofia. It is subsequently revealed that Grace's own mother was committed to a psychiatric hospital, sparking a personal vendetta against the institute and its practices.

Grace tracks one of Philip's former assistants, Dr. Mercedes Kent, and questions her about her time at Zurvan. Mercedes reveals that Sofia, an exchange student who came to Zurvan and birthed Angelique and Annabel, conjoined twins. Sofia fled the institute with her daughters back to France, where the twins performed in circus freak shows before being recaptured and recommitted to Zurvan. Philip observed a disturbed dynamic between Angelique and Annabel, with Angelique exhibiting complacency while Annabel exhibited violent impulses. Mercedes reveals to Grace that Annabel died of lung failure after Philip surgically separated them, and that Angelique has since lived alone under Philip's supervision.

Grace informs Larry before driving to Zurvan, where she is confronted by Philip, who incapacitates her with a sedative. In a series of hallucinations, Grace bears witness to Annabel's psychotic state of mind, Philip's sexual affair with Angelique, and his declaration of Annabel as a psychologically "parasitic" entity. In order to pursue his affair with Angelique, Philip performed the surgical separation of the twins which killed Annabel; Angelique has since lived in a state of guilt, causing her to adopt elements of her dead sister's psyche. As Philip attempts to rationalize his actions, Angelique realizes that Philip manipulated her and also killed her mother. Grace, in a dissociated state, stabs Philip to death with a large syringe. Shortly after, Larry, who arrived at Zurvan to help Grace, is stabbed by Angelique. When Larry calls her by name, Grace corrects him, saying her name is Annabel. Angelique proceeds to cut Grace along her ribcage with a scalpel, creating a matching surgical scar the two can share. The following morning, Angelique and Grace depart Zurvan, their arms wrapped around each other.

== Cast ==
- Stephen Rea as Dr. Philip Lacan
- Lou Doillon as Angelique Turner / Annabel Tristiana Turner
- Chloë Sevigny as Grace Collier
- Dallas Roberts as Dylan Wallace
- JR Bourne as Larry Franklin
- William B. Davis as Dr. Bryant
- Gabrielle Rose as Dr. Mercedes Kent
- Talia Williams as Lily
- Rachel Williams as Eve
- Erica Van Briel as Sofia Tristiana

== Production ==
=== Development ===
During a screening of New Rose Hotel at the 1998 Venice Film Festival, producer Edward R. Pressman announced his intention to remake Sisters. Pressman said of the project:

There’s obviously been a post-Scream reaction in Hollywood to the horror film. Scream regenerated the form commercially, and whenever a film does that well it tends to create a gold rush. That’s why we’re seeing all these Alfred Hitchcock remakes at the moment like A Perfect Murder, Rear Window and Psycho. So why not remake a Hitchcock knock-off. which was what SISTERS was always being called.

After Douglas Buck became attached as a co-writer and director, he commented on his approach to the material: "In the original film, which I love, De Palma chose style over substance. I'm interested in exploring all the other stuff that's there—the perversity, the tragedy, the sadness. All those character traits make it, to me, more interesting. I want to make the characters more alive." De Palma was reportedly given a draft of the script, and was "enthusiastic" about the adaptation.

=== Filming ===
Principal photography took place over 23 days in the spring of 2006 in North Carolina as well as Vancouver, British Columbia on an estimated budget of $5,000,000. Shooting in Vancouver was reported to begin on March 13, 2006. Filming completed in Vancouver by May 1, 2006.

== Release ==
Sisters premiered at the Sitges Film Festival on October 13, 2006. It had its United States premiere at South by Southwest in Austin, Texas in March 2007, and film subsequently screened at the Whistler Film Festival in Canada on November 30, 2006.

Image Entertainment released Sisters on DVD on March 11, 2008, followed by a Blu-ray on October 5, 2010. Severin Films released a 4K UHD Blu-ray edition on July 29, 2025.

== Reception ==
John Anderson of Variety praised the film, summarizing: "Siring a remake of a film that's as genetically linked to identity, duality and voyeurism as Brian De Palma's Sisters is its own twisted-bloody sibling rivalry, anyone? Yet Douglas Buck has not only made a worthy partner to his predecessor's famously violent slasher thriller; he's outdone him in many ways." Fangoria writer Michael Gingold praised the film's performances, cinematography, and use of color summarizing: "Sisters is a mostly engrossing and occasionally quite frightening film that adopts a somewhat lower-key tone than De Palma’s showier original." Peter Brunette of Screen Daily wrote, "the film is unlikely to gain significant commercial distribution in the US. Nevertheless, enough nearly laugh-inducing gore drenches the film to give it what will surely be a robust life on DVD for dedicated horror fans, and the inclusion of known quantities like Rea and Sevigny may result in middling foreign sales as well... it is also true that the scenes in the last third of the film are so grotesque and blood-saturated as to achieve a kind of kitschy, yet purposeful transcendence. A dream sequence, especially, produces particularly powerful images that suggest Buck is a filmmaker with visual talent that will ultimately manifest itself more tellingly in a subsequent film. Still, carried a smidgeon too far, these resonant moments sometimes all too easily induce laughter, and not of the uneasy variety."

Diana Welch of The Austin Chronicle gave the film an unfavorable review, writing that it "veers from the Hitchcockian style of his predecessor and goes for a more Cronenberg-esque freak show, where much is made of his characters' emotional and physical scarring... Though the conceit of the remake is basically the same as the original, the film has been updated with cell phones, computer cams, and a completely rewritten ending that mixes gore, homoeroticism, and drugs and sets them in a creepy asylum where sad, masked children play games – well, really just hit one another with sticks – among the trees at night." Writing for the French publication Abus de Ciné, Thomas Bourgeois panned the film, noting: "This cinematic quagmire, poorly put together and boring, turns grotesque during a finale worthy of a bad giallo, where sobriety turns into Z-grade horror. This Sisters is therefore a complete failure. Not everyone can be De Palma."

Cindy White of IGN was critical of the performances, though she wrote favorably of Sevigny's: "The only standout performance is given by the always reliable Sevigny. She often seems much smarter than her roles—and that's certainly the case here—but there's also something damaged and vulnerable about her. Rea is wasted in a role that doesn't give him much to do but look worried most of the time. The opposite is true of Doillon, who is given a meaty dual role to sink into but isn't able to transform her beautiful femme fatale persona into an emotionally complex character."

Kaori Shoji of The Japan Times commented on the film's tone and screenplay, writing: "Oddly, despite the modern trappings, the ambience remains mustily analogue, enhanced by frequent cuts to monochrome footage supposedly taken in the 1980s but resembling something out of a 1930s vampire movie, complete with blurred visuals and staticky sound. This quirky discrepancy aside, there are plot inconsistencies that pile up faster than the body count. By the final reel, you've given up caring and Buck seems to have given up on coherency."
