= List of LGBTQ-related films of 2026 =

This is a list of lesbian, gay, bisexual, transgender or queer-related films released in 2026. It contains theatrically released films that deal with important gay, lesbian, bisexual, transgender or queer characters or issues and may have same-sex romance or relationships as a plot device.

== Films ==
Title	Director	Country	Genre	Cast	Notes	Ref
9 Moons (9 lunas)	Patricia Ortega	Spain, Belgium	Comedy	Zack Gómez-Rolls, Jorge Sanz, María León, Sara Sálamo, Fernando Guallar, Kiti Mánver		
Accused	Anubhuti Kashyap	India	Psychological thriller	Konkona Sen Sharma, Pratibha Ranta		
Adam's Apple	Amy K. Jenkins	United States	Documentary	Adam Sieswerda, Amy K. Jenkins		
Agentes Muito Especiais	Pedro Antônio	Brazil	Comedy, Action	Marcus Majella, Pedroca Monteiro, Dira Paes		
Ancestors	David Turpin	Ireland, United Kingdom	Drama	Éanna Hardwicke, Jack Wolfe, Jessica Reynolds, Rupert Everett, Christina Hendricks		
Another League (Pioneras: Solo querían jugar)	Marta Díaz de Lope Díaz	Spain, Portugal	Comedy-drama	Sofía de Iznájar, Bruna Lucadamo, Aixa Villagrán, Daniel Ibáñez, José Troncoso, Leire Aguiar, Nora Otxoteko, Elena Irureta		
Animol	Ashley Walters	United Kingdom	Romantic drama	Tut Nyuot, Vladyslav Baliuk, Sekou Diaby, Stephen Graham, Sharon Duncan-Brewster		
Another Day (Garance)	Jeanne Herry	France	Drama	Adèle Exarchopoulos, Sara Giraudeau, Rudgy Pajany		
Antidiva: The Carole Pope Confessions	Michelle Mama	Canada	Documentary	Carole Pope		
Baby Jackfruit Baby Guava (Em bé đồng bóng, em bé ngạo nghễ và em bé đau lòng)	Nông Nhật Quang	Vietnam, South Korea, Switzerland	Documentary			
The Ballad of Judas Priest	Sam Dunn, Tom Morello	United States	Documentary	Rob Halford, K.K. Downing, Glenn Tipton, Ian Hill, Scott Travis		
Bang My Box: The Robin Byrd Story	Jyllian Gunther, Stephanie Schwam	United States	Documentary	Robin Byrd		
Barbara Forever	Brydie O'Connor	United States	Documentary	Barbara Hammer		
Big Girls Don't Cry	Paloma Schneideman	New Zealand	Drama	Ani Palmer, Rain Spencer, Noah Taylor		
Bitter Christmas (Amarga Navidad)	Pedro Almodóvar	Spain	Tragicomedy	Bárbara Lennie, Leonardo Sbaraglia, Aitana Sánchez-Gijón, Victoria Luengo, Patrick Criado		
Black Church Bay	Rhys Marc Jones	United Kingdom	Mystery thriller	Tom Cullen, Joe Locke, Marli Siu		
La bola negra	Javier Calvo, Javier Ambrossi	Spain, France	Drama	Guitarricadelafuente, Miguel Bernardeau, Carlos González, Milo Quifes, Lola Dueñas, Penélope Cruz, Glenn Close		
Bowels of Hell (Privadas de Suas Vidas)	Gustavo Vinagre, Gurcius Gewdner	Brazil	Horror comedy	Martha Nowill, Otávio Muller, Chandelly Braz		
The Brittney Griner Story	Alexandria Stapleton	United States	Documentary	Brittney Griner		
Chica Checa	Šimon Holý	Czechia, Slovakia, France	Comedy-drama	Pavla Tomicová, Jan Cina, Alexandra Borbély, Erwan Kepoa Falé		
Club Kid	Jordan Firstman	United States	Drama	Jordan Firstman, Cara Delevingne, Diego Calva, Reggie Absolom		
Coward	Lukas Dhont	Belgium, France, Netherlands	War, Drama	Valentin Campagne, Emmanuel Macchia, Jonas Wertz		
Cyclone	Philip Yung	Hong Kong	Drama	Yuqiao Liu, Edwynn Li, Jenny Suen		
A Distant Call	Andrea Suwito	Indonesia, United Kingdom, France	Documentary			
Don't Come Out (No Salgas)	Victoria Linares Villegas	Dominican Republic	Horror, Drama	Cecile van Welie, Gabriela Cortés, Camila Issa		
The Education of Jane Cumming	Sophie Heldman	Germany, Switzerland, United Kingdom	Drama	Flora Nicholson, Clare Dunne, Mia Tharia, Fiona Shaw		
Elephants in the Fog	Abinash Bikram Shah	Nepal, France, Germany, Brazil, Norway	Thriller	Pushpa Thing Lama, Deepika Yadav, Jasmine Bishwokarma, Aliz Ghimire		
Elsinore	Simon Stone	United Kingdom, United States, Italy	Biographical drama	Andrew Scott, Olivia Colman, Billie Piper, Johnny Flynn, Luke Thompson		
Ephemera (浮浮游游)	Shan Jiang	United States, Singapore	Drama, Romance	Yvonne Shuyu Zhang, Shu-Yi		
Flesh and Fuel (Du Fioul dans les artères)	Pierre Le Gall	France, Poland	Drama	Alexis Manenti, Julian Świeżewski, Armindo Alves de Sa		
François.e	Jean-François Asselin	Canada	Comedy	Louis Morissette, Pascale Drevillon, Geneviève Schmidt		
Fruit Gathering	Aung Phyoe	Myanmar, France, Czechia	Romantic drama	Nandar Myat Aung, Nandar Myint Lwin, Thida Soe Khant, Tin Tin Ei, Min Nyo		
Girls Like Girls	Hayley Kiyoko	United States	Romance	Maya da Costa, Myra Molloy		
Give Me the Ball!	Liz Garbus, Elizabeth Wolff	United States	Documentary	Billie Jean King		
Gugu's World (Feito Pipa)	Allan Deberton	Brazil	Drama	Yuri Gomes, Teca Pereira, Lázaro Ramos, Carlos Francisco, Georgina Castro		
Heals	Pailin Wedel	Thailand	Documentary	Pangina Heals		
Heartstopper Forever	Wash Westmoreland	United Kingdom	Romantic comedy	Kit Connor, Joe Locke		
The Hidden Face of the Earth (La Face cachée de la Terre)	Arnaud Alain	France	Documentary			
Hunky Jesus	Jennifer M. Kroot	United States	Documentary	George Takei, Sister Roma, Honey Mahogany, Sister Vish-Knew, Sister Bella, Donna Summer		
I Am Going to Miss You (Eu Vou Ter Saudades de Você)	Daniel Ribeiro	Brazil	Romantic drama	Alice Marcone, Gabriel Lodi, Luca Scarpelli		
I Am Mario (Soy Mario)	Sharon Kleinberg	Mexico	Drama	Oustin León, Héctor Kotsifakis, Mayra Batalla		
I Come Home	Glen Wood	Canada	Drama	Hannah Cheesman, Carlos Gonzalez-Vio, Ryan Ali, Jordan Hayes		
I Want Your Sex	Gregg Araki	United States	Erotic thriller	Olivia Wilde, Cooper Hoffman, Charli XCX, Daveed Diggs, Mason Gooding, Chase Sui Wonders, Johnny Knoxville, Margaret Cho, Roxane Mesquida		
ìfé: (The Sequel)	Pamela Adie	Nigeria	Romantic drama	Uzoamaka Power, Gbubemi Ejeye, Ozzy Agu		
In a Whisper (À voix basse)	Leyla Bouzid	France, Tunisia	Drama	Eya Bouteraa, Hiam Abbass, Marion Barbeau, Feriel Chamari		
An Island Away From You (A una isla de ti)	Alexis Morante	Spain	Romantic comedy	Freddie Dennis, Jaime Zatarain, Julia Martínez, Toni Acosta, Carlos González		
Iván & Hadoum	Ian de la Rosa	Spain, Germany, Belgium	Romantic drama	Silver Chicón, Herminia Loh	Teddy Award for Best Queer Feature winner	
Jaripeo	Efraín Mojica, Rebecca Zweig	Mexico, United States, France	Documentary			
Jim Queen	Nicolas Athane, Marco Nguyen	France, Belgium	Animation, comedy	Alex Ramirès, Jérémy Gillet		
Joy Boy: A Tribute to Julius Eastman	Mawena Yehouessi, Fallon Mayanja, Rob Jacobs, Victoire Karera Kampire, Paul Shemisi, Anne Reijniers	Belgium, France, Democratic Republic of the Congo		Julius Eastman		
Julián	Louise Bagnall, Guillaume Lorin, Mark Mullery	Ireland, Canada, Denmark, Luxembourg, United Kingdom	Animation, Family	Knyght Darius Jack, Milcania Diaz-Rojas	Based on Julián is a Mermaid	
Labrador: Autopsy of Silence	Rodrigue Jean	Canada	Drama	Christopher Angatookalook, Alexandre Landry, Gabrielle Poulin B., Jassinth Thiagarajah		
Lady Champagne	D'Arcy Drollinger	United States	Adventure, Action comedy	D'Arcy Drollinger, Matthew Martin, Seton Brown		
La Gradiva	Marine Atlan	France, Italy	Coming-of-age drama	Antonia Buresi, Colas Quignard, Suzanne Gerin, Mitia Capellier		
Last Routine (Šampión)	Jakub Cervenka	Slovakia, Czech Republic	Biographical period drama	Adam Kubala, Jana Nagyová		
Leviticus	Adrian Chiarella	Australia, United States	Horror	Joe Bird, Stacy Clausen, Mia Wasikowska		
The Liar's Circle (El círculo de los mentirosos)	Nancy Cruz Orozco	Mexico	Drama	Dayane Romo, Michelle Betancourt, Argeniz Aldrete, Jaime Bernache, Gerardo Trejoluna		
Loafers	Zach Schnitzer	United States	Coming-of-age, Dramedy	Zach Schnitzer, Dan Haller, Melissa Marie, Beck Nolan, Cole Steeves, Chloe Rodriques, Olemich Tugas, Ruby Sevcik		
London	Victor Di Marco and Marcio Picoli	Brazil	Queer drama	Victor Di Marco, Carla Cassapo, Jessica Teixeira		
Lone Star Bull	David Stoddart	United States, United Kingdom	Drama	Luke Macfarlane, Shangela		
Love on a Tightrope	Arima León	Spain	Drama	Adriana Ugarte, Tania Santana		
Lunar Sway	Nick Butler	Canada	Comedy	Noah Parker, Douglas Smith, Liza Weil		
Madfabulous	Celyn Jones	United Kingdom	Historical comedy-drama	Callum Scott Howells, Ruby Stokes, Rupert Everett	Portrait of Henry, 5th Marquess of Anglesey	
The Man I Love	Ira Sachs	United States, France	Musical	Rami Malek, Tom Sturridge, Luther Ford, Rebecca Hall, Ebon Moss-Bachrach		
Masc	Bertil Nilsson	United Kingdom	Drama			
Mickey	Dano García	Mexico	Documentary	Dano García		
Mickey & Richard	Ryan A. White, A.P. Pickle	United States	Documentary	Richard Bernstein		
Mineshaft: The Cruising Murders	Jeffrey Schwarz	United States	Documentary		Around William Friedkin's 1980 film Cruising	
Mouse	Kelly O'Sullivan, Alex Thompson	United States	Drama	Sophie Okonedo, Katherine Mallen Kupferer, Chloe Coleman, Tara Mallen, Iman Vellani		
My Brother's Killer	Rachel Mason	United States	Documentary	Billy London		
My Dearest Señorita (Mi querida señorita)	Fernando González Molina	Spain	Drama	Elizabeth Martínez, Anna Castillo, Paco León, Nagore Aranburu, Manu Ríos, Eneko Sagardoy, Lola Rodríguez, María Galiana, Delphina Bianco	Remake of the 1972 film of the same name	
Nagi Notes (ナギダイアリー)	Koji Fukada	Japan	Drama	Takako Matsu, Kenichi Matsuyama, Shizuka Ishibashi		
Narciso	Marcelo Martinessi	Paraguay, Germany, Uruguay	Thriller	Diro Romero, Manuel Cuenca, Mona Martinez		
Neverman	Rodrigo Barriuso	Canada	Drama	Justin Vivian Bond, Marie-Josée Croze, Zaiba Baig, Elias Koteas		
No Rest for the Wicked	Kasper Kalle	Denmark	Horror	Pilou Asbæk, Egor Venned		
The Passion According to G.H.B. (A paixão segundo G.H.B.)	Gustavo Vinagre, Vinicius Couto	Brazil	Drama	Vinicius Couto, Igor Mo, Christiane Tricerri, Luciano Falcão, Rodrigo Campos	Magical realist gay retelling of The Passion According to G.H.	
Perfect	Millicent Hailes	United States	Drama, Romance	Julia Fox, Ashley Moore, Lío Mehiel, Micaela Wittman		
Public Access	David Shadrack Smith	United States	Documentary			
Puppygirl	Henry Hanson	United States	Documentary	Milo Talwani, Henry Hanson, Jessi Gaston		
River Dreams (Сны реки)	Kristina Mikhailova	Kazakhstan, Switzerland, United Kingdom	Documentary			
Roma Elastica	Bertrand Mandico	France, Italy	Comedy, Drama	Marion Cotillard, Noémie Merlant, Isabella Ferrari		
A Safe Distance	Gloria Mercer	Canada	Thriller	Bethany Brown, Cody Kearsley, Tandia Mercedes, Chris McNally		
Scary Movie	Michael Tiddes	United States	Comedy, Horror	Marlon Wayans, Shawn Wayans, Anna Faris, Regina Hall	Ray Wilkins struggles with his homosexual tendencies, despite claiming to be ex-gay. Greg Phillipe has a transgender son, Jess. A character who comes out as non-binary gets murdered by several people.	
A Secret Heart (Coeur secret)	Tom Fontenille	France	Documentary			
Seventeen	Justin Ducharme	Canada	Drama	Aalayna Primrose, Nizhonniya Austin, Taio Gelinas, Kaniehtiio Horn		
Six Months in a Pink and Blue Building (Seis meses en el edificio rosa con azul)	Bruno Santamaría Razo	Mexico, Denmark, Brazil	Drama	Jade Reyes, Sofía Espinosa, Lázaro Gabino, Eduardo Ayala, Valeria Vanegas		
Shelter (Cobijo)	Adrián Silvestre	Spain	Documentary			
Something You Should Know About Me	Andy Rose Fidoten	United States	Romantic comedy	Andy Rose Fidoten, Morgan Sullivan, Sydney Diaz		
A Song Without Home (სიმღერა სახლის გარეშე)	Rati Tsiteladze	Georgia, United States	Documentary	Adelina		
Stop! That! Train!	Adam Shankman	United States	Comedy, Action	Ginger Minj, Jujubee, RuPaul, Brooke Lynn Hytes		
A Street Named Cuba (Calle Cuba)	Vanessa Batista	Cuba, Chile, Mexico	Documentary			
Summer Drift (Virages)	Aline Suter, Céline Carridroit	France, Switzerland	Documentary			
Teenage Sex and Death at Camp Miasma	Jane Schoenbrun	United States	Horror	Hannah Einbinder, Gillian Anderson		
Tell Me Everything (עצמאות)	Moshe Rosenthal	Israel, France, United Kingdom	Drama	Yair Mazor, Ido Tako, Assi Cohen, Keren Tzur		
This Is I (ディスイズアイ)	Yusaku Matsumoto	Japan	Drama	Haruki Mochizuki, Saitō Takumi	Based on Haruna Ai's autobiography	
To Dance is to Resist	Julian Lautenbacher	Ukraine, Germany	Documentary	Jay, Vol'demar Kabus		
Trial of Hein (Der Heimatlose)	Kai Stänicke	Germany	Drama	Paul Boche, Emilia Schüle, Philip Froissant, Jeanette Hain		
Tu Reina	Andrés Salgado	Colombia	Drama, Thriller	Mara Cifuentes, Lucho Velasco, Juan Palau		
Two Dads, And Me (Yo tengo dos papás)	Edgar Reyes	Mexico	Documentary			
Two Mountains Weighing Down My Chest	Viv Li	Germany, Netherlands	Documentary			
Uchronia	Fil Ieropoulos	Greece, Netherlands	Documentary	Kristof, Flomaria Papadaki, Marlo Mortimer, Amani Cosmo, Robert Carithers	Based on Arthur Rimbaud's "Une Saison En Enfer"	
Uncle Roy	Keri Pickett	United States	Documentary	Roy Blakey		
A Very Good Boy (Un jeune homme de bonne famille)	Sébastien Lifshitz	France	Documentary	Claude Loir		
What Will I Become?	Lexie Bean, Logan Rozos	United States	Documentary	Lexie Bean, Logan Rozos, Blake Brockington, Kyler Prescott		
A Woman's Life (La vie d'une femme)	Charline Bourgeois-Tacquet	France, Belgium	Drama	Léa Drucker, Mélanie Thierry		
