= 40th Independent Spirit Awards =

US film awards ceremony in 2025

40th Film Independent Spirit Awards
- Awarded for: Best in independent film and independent television
- Date: February 22, 2025
- Site: Santa Monica Pier; Santa Monica, California, U.S.
- Hosted by: Aidy Bryant

Highlights
- Best Feature: Anora
- Most awards: Film: Anora (3); TV: Baby Reindeer (3)
- Most nominations: Film: Anora / I Saw the TV Glow (5); TV: Shōgun (5)

Television coverage
- Network: YouTube (through @filmindependent + @imdb)

The 40th Film Independent Spirit Awards, honoring the best independent films and television series of 2024, were presented by Film Independent on February 22, 2025. The ceremony was held at the Santa Monica Pier in Santa Monica, California, and was hosted by American actress and comedian Aidy Bryant for the second consecutive year; Bryant's hosting duties the previous year was widely praised and made headlines. For the third consecutive year, the ceremony was streamed live on the YouTube channels of both IMDb and Film Independent, and across Film Independent's social media platforms.

The nominations were announced live via YouTube on December 4, 2024. Anora and I Saw the TV Glow led the film nominations with five each, followed by Dìdi with four. Shōgun received the most television nominations with five, followed by Baby Reindeer and English Teacher with four each.

During the ceremony, longtime Film Independent president Josh Welsh was remembered by acting president Brenda Robinson, who delivered a speech about the "visionary" who died on December 31, 2024, after a five-year battle with colon cancer at age 62. Later in the show, during his acceptance speech for Best Feature, Anora filmmaker Sean Baker also paid tribute to Welsh and his contributions to independent cinema, calling him "a true champion of independent voices and a wonderful, kind human being".

The grant recipients of the Emerging Filmmakers Awards were announced on January 4, 2025.

== Winners and nominees ==
=== Film ===
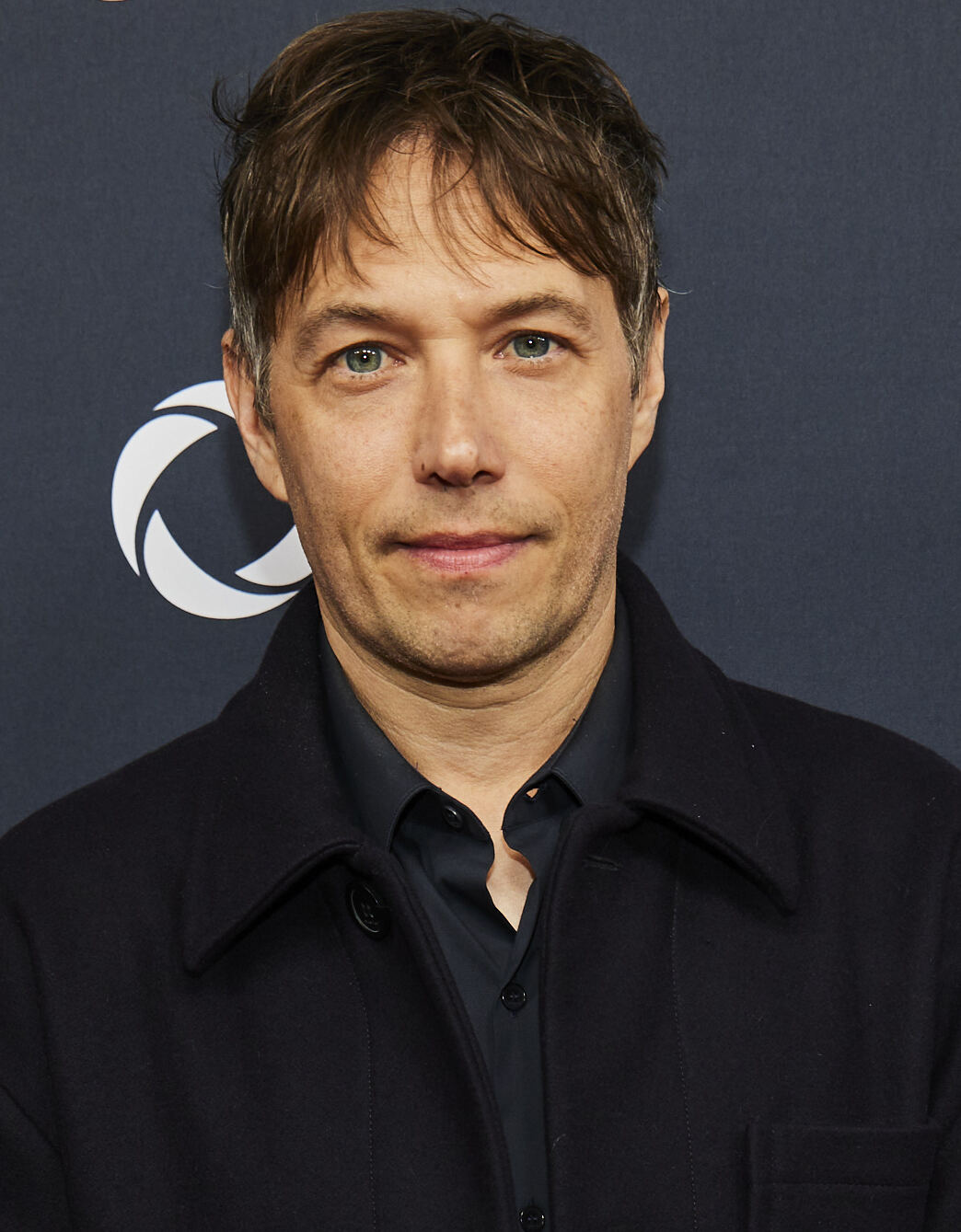
Sean Baker, Best Feature co-winner and Best Director winner

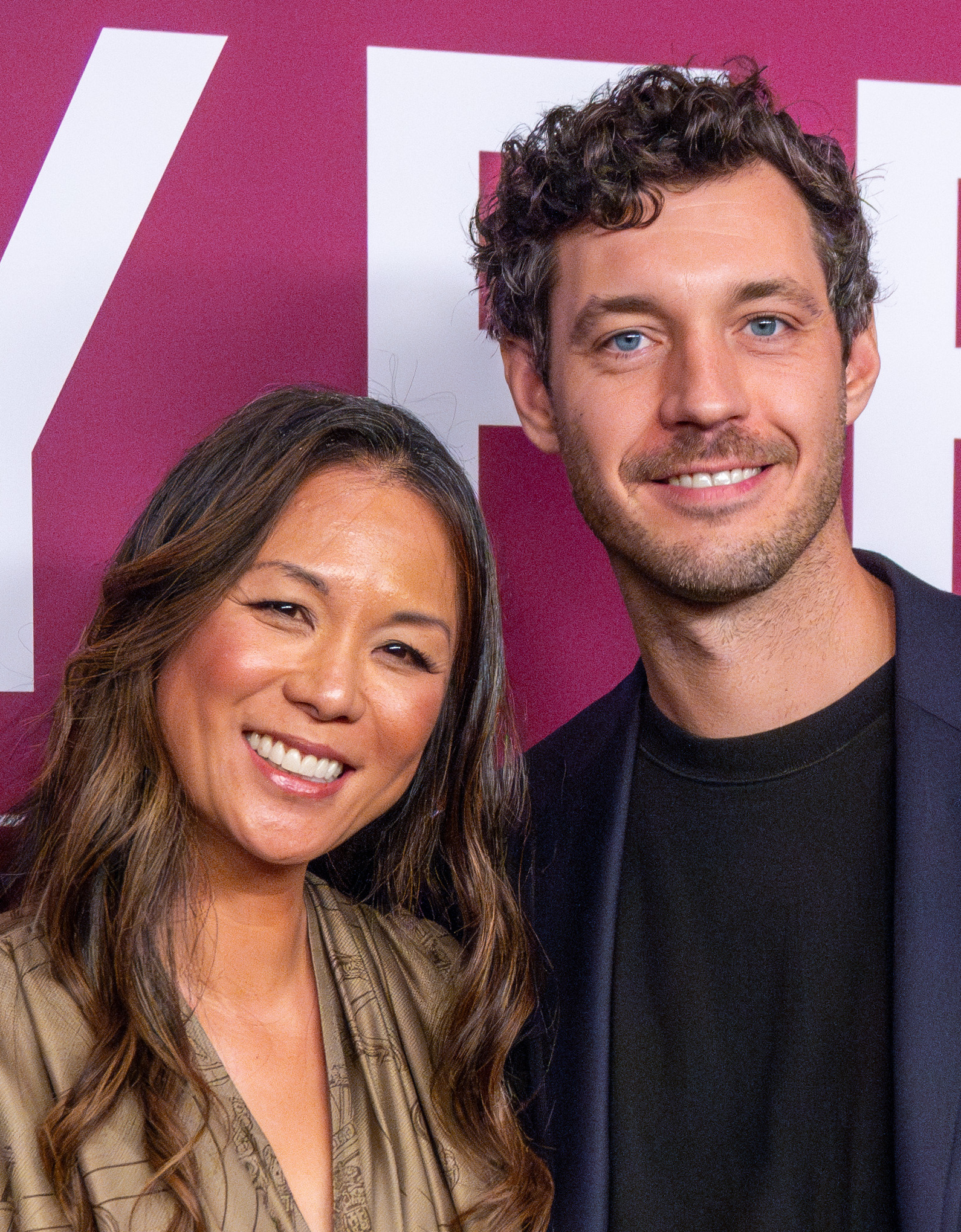
Samantha Quan (left) and Alex Coco (right), Best Feature co-winners

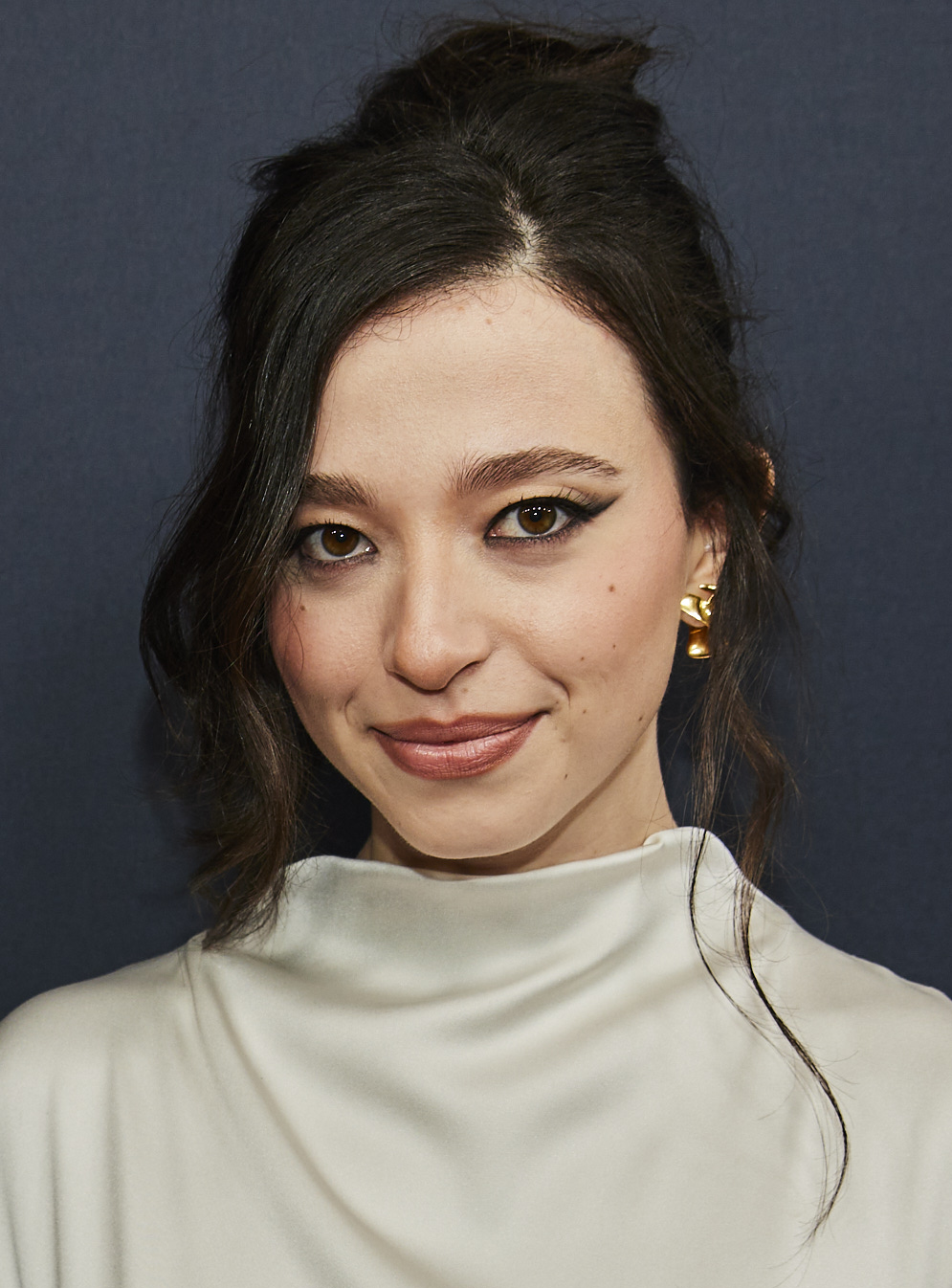
Mikey Madison, Best Lead Performance winner

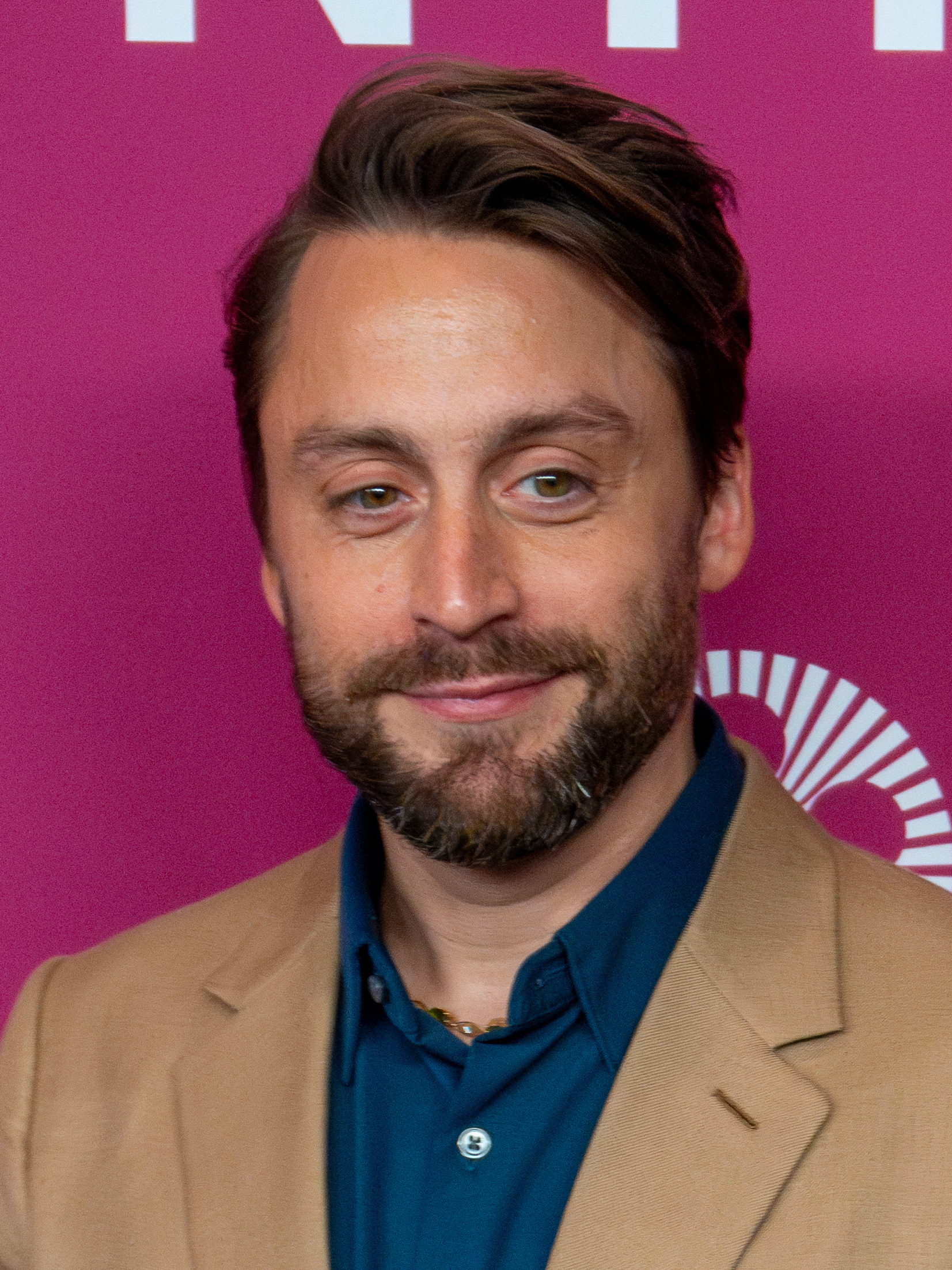
Kieran Culkin, Best Supporting Performance winner

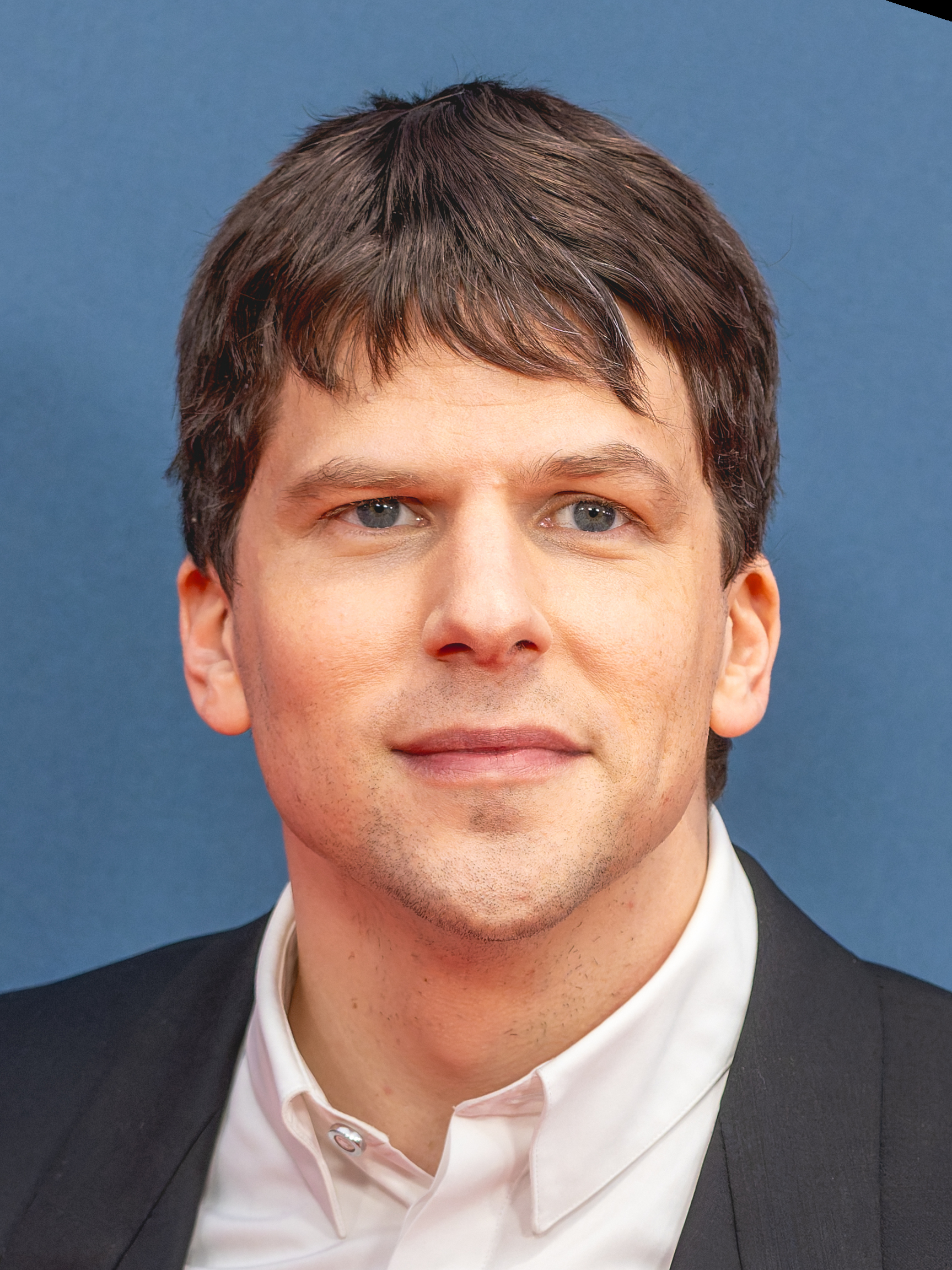
Jesse Eisenberg, Best Screenplay winner

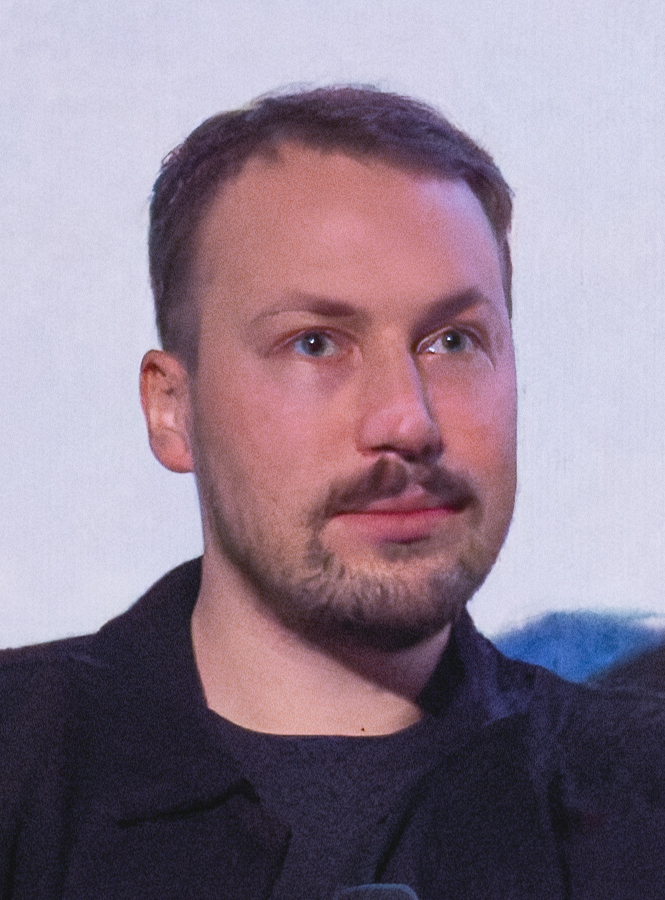
Gints Zilbalodis, Best International Film winner

Best Feature	Best Director
Anora – Sean Baker, Alex Coco, and Samantha Quan; I Saw the TV Glow – Ali Herting, Sam Intili, Dave McCary, Emma Stone, and Sarah Winshall; Nickel Boys – Joslyn Barnes, Dede Gardner, Jeremy Kleiner, and David Levine; Sing Sing – Clint Bentley, Greg Kwedar, and Monique Walton; The Substance – Tim Bevan, Coralie Fargeat, and Eric Fellner	Sean Baker – Anora; Ali Abbasi – The Apprentice; Brady Corbet – The Brutalist; Alonso Ruizpalacios – La cocina; Jane Schoenbrun – I Saw the TV Glow
Best Lead Performance	Best Supporting Performance
Mikey Madison – Anora as Anora "Ani" Mikheeva; Amy Adams – Nightbitch as Mother; Ryan Destiny – The Fire Inside as Claressa "T-Rex" Shields; Colman Domingo – Sing Sing as John "Divine G" Whitfield; Keith Kupferer – Ghostlight as Dan Mueller; Demi Moore – The Substance as Elisabeth Sparkle; Hunter Schafer – Cuckoo as Gretchen Vanderkurt; Justice Smith – I Saw the TV Glow as Owen; June Squibb – Thelma as Thelma Post; Sebastian Stan – The Apprentice as Donald Trump	Kieran Culkin – A Real Pain as Benji Kaplan; Yura Borisov – Anora as Igor; Joan Chen – Dìdi as Chungsing Wang; Danielle Deadwyler – The Piano Lesson as Berniece Charles; Jack Haven – I Saw the TV Glow as Maddy; Carol Kane – Between the Temples as Carla Kessler; Karren Karagulian – Anora as Toros; Kani Kusruti – Girls Will Be Girls as Anila; Clarence Maclin – Sing Sing as Clarence "Divine Eye" Maclin; Adam Pearson – A Different Man as Oswald
Best Breakthrough Performance	Best Screenplay
Maisy Stella – My Old Ass as Elliott; Isaac Krasner – Big Boys as Jamie; Katy O'Brian – Love Lies Bleeding as Jacqueline "Jackie" Cleaver; Mason Alexander Park – National Anthem as Carrie; René Pérez Joglar – In the Summers as Vicente	A Real Pain – Jesse Eisenberg; Heretic – Scott Beck and Bryan Woods; My Old Ass – Megan Park; A Different Man – Aaron Schimberg; I Saw the TV Glow – Jane Schoenbrun
Best First Feature	Best First Screenplay
Dìdi – Sean Wang (director/producer); Valerie Bush, Carlos López Estrada, and Josh Peters (producers); In the Summers – Alessandra Lacorazza Samudio (director); Janek Ambros, Lynette Coll, Alexander Dinelaris, Cynthia Fernandez De La Cruz, Cristóbal Güell, Sergio Alberto Lira, Rob Quadrino, Jan Suter, Daniel Tantalean, Nando Vila, Slava Vladimirov, and Stephanie Yankwitt (producers); Janet Planet – Annie Baker (director/producer); Andrew Goldman, Dan Janvey, and Derrick Tseng (producers); The Piano Lesson – Malcolm Washington (director); Todd Black and Denzel Washington (producers); Problemista – Julio Torres (director/producer); Ali Herting, Dave McCary, and Emma Stone (producers)	Dìdi – Sean Wang; The Feeling That the Time for Doing Something Has Passed – Joanna Arnow; Janet Planet – Annie Baker; Good One – India Donaldson; Problemista – Julio Torres
Best Documentary Feature	Best International Film
No Other Land – Yuval Abraham, Basel Adra, Hamdan Ballal, and Rachel Szor (directors/producers); Fabien Greenberg and Bård Kjøge Rønning (producers); Gaucho Gaucho – Michael Dweck and Gregory Kershaw (directors/producers); Christos V. Konstantakopoulos, Cameron O'Reilly, and Matthew Perniciaro (producers); Hummingbirds – Silvia Del Carmen Castaños and Estefanía "Beba" Contreras (directors); Miguel Drake-McLaughlin, Diane Ng, Ana Rodriguez-Falco, and Jillian Schlesinger (directors/producers); Leslie Benavides and Rivkah Beth Medow (producers); Patrice: The Movie – Ted Passon (director); Kyla Harris, Innbo Shim, and Emily Spivack (producers); Soundtrack to a Coup d'Etat – Johan Grimonprez (director); Rémi Grellety and Daan Milius (producers)	Flow (Latvia, France, and Belgium) – Gints Zilbalodis (director); All We Imagine as Light – (France, India, Netherlands, and Luxembourg) – Payal Kapadia (director); Black Dog (China) – Guan Hu (director); Green Border (Poland, France, Czech Republic, and Belgium) – Agnieszka Holland (director); Hard Truths (United Kingdom) – Mike Leigh (director)
Best Cinematography	Best Editing
Jomo Fray – Nickel Boys; Đinh Duy Hưng – Inside the Yellow Cocoon Shell; Maria von Hausswolff – Janet Planet; Juan Pablo Ramírez – La cocina; Rina Yang – The Fire Inside	Hansjörg Weißbrich – September 5; Laura Colwell and Vanara Taing – Jazzy; Olivier Bugge Coutté and Olivia Neergaard-Holm – The Apprentice; Anne McCabe – Nightbitch; Arielle Zakowski – Dìdi

==== Films with multiple nominations and awards ====
Films that received multiple nominations
Nominations	Film
5	Anora
5	I Saw the TV Glow
4	Dìdi
3	The Apprentice
3	Janet Planet
3	Sing Sing
2	Big Boys
2	A Different Man
2	The Fire Inside
2	Girls Will Be Girls
2	Ghostlight
2	In the Summers
2	Jazzy
2	La cocina
2	My Old Ass
2	Nickel Boys
2	Nightbitch
2	The Piano Lesson
2	Problemista
2	A Real Pain
2	The Substance

Films that won multiple awards
Awards	Film
3	Anora
2	Dìdi
2	A Real Pain

=== Television ===
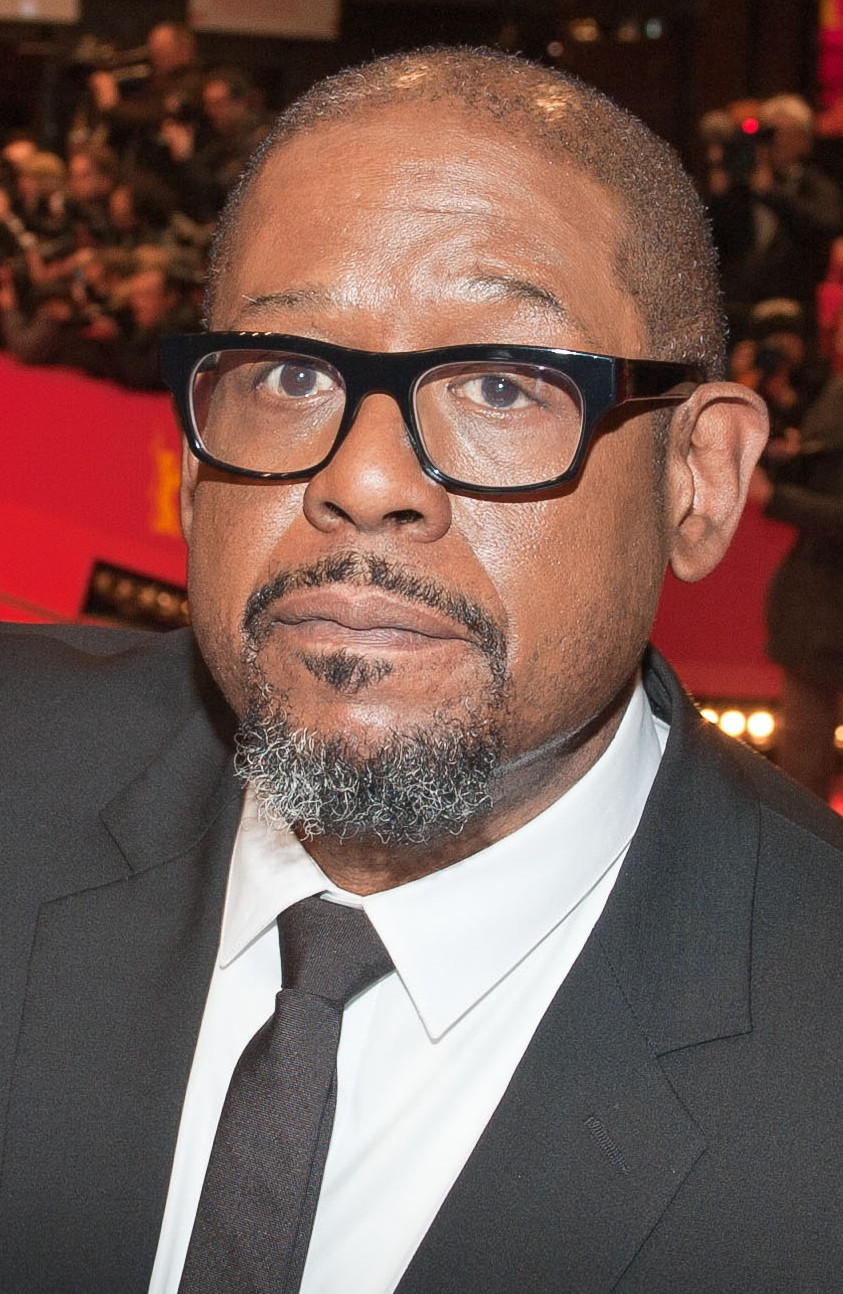
Forest Whitaker, Best New Non-Scripted or Documentary Series co-winner

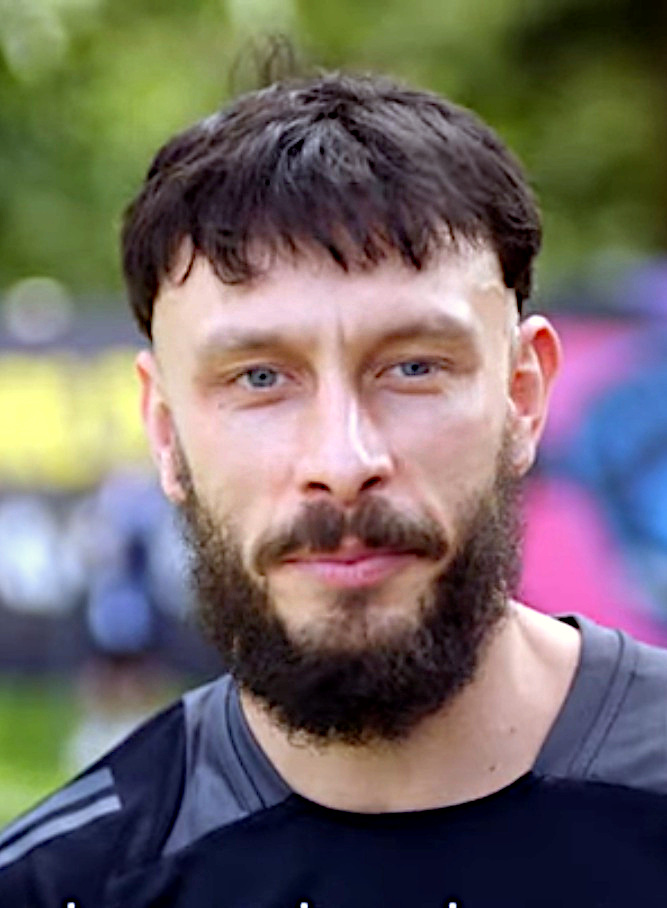
Richard Gadd, Best Lead Performance in a New Scripted Series winner

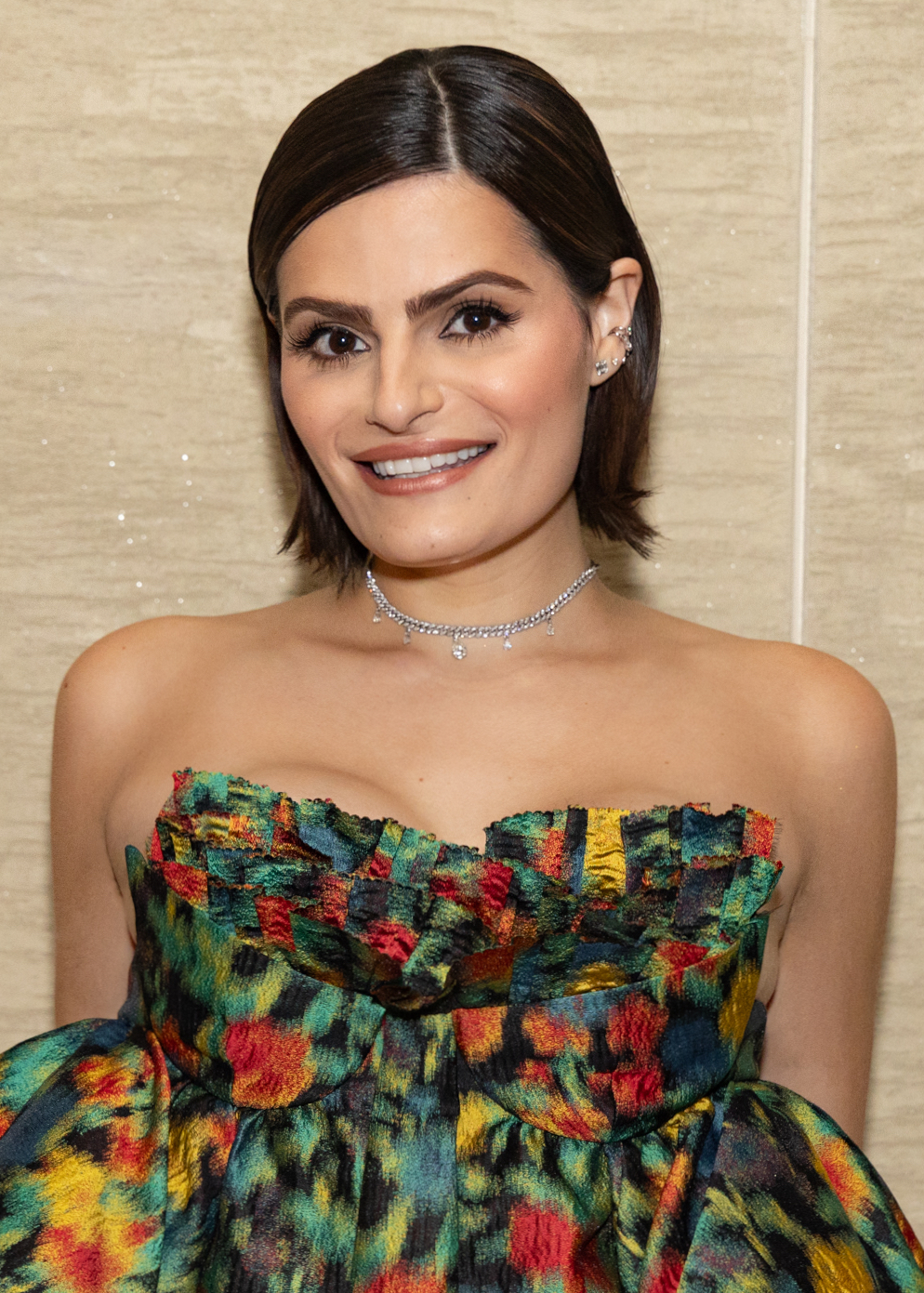
Nava Mau, Best Supporting Performance in a New Scripted Series winner

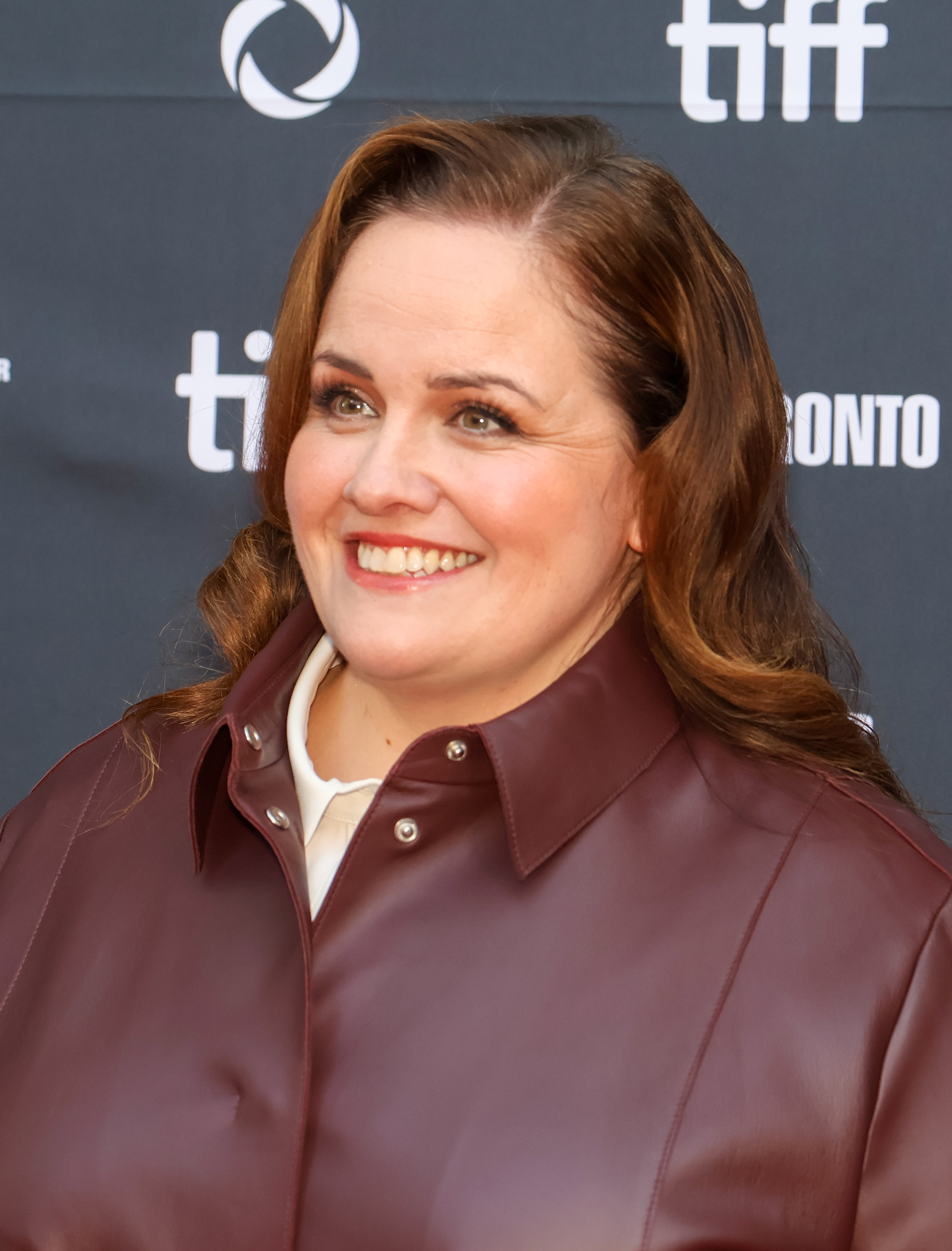
Jessica Gunning, Best Breakthrough Performance in a New Scripted Series winner

Best New Scripted Series	Best New Non-Scripted or Documentary Series
Shōgun – Rachel Kondo and Justin Marks (creators/executive producers); Edward L. McDonnell, Michael De Luca, and Michaela Clavell (executive producers); Shannon Goss, Andrew Macdonald, Allon Reich, and Jamie Vega Wheeler (co-executive producers) (FX); Baby Reindeer – Richard Gadd (creator/executive producer); Wim De Greef, Petra Fried, Matt Jarvis, and Ed Macdonald (executive producers) (Netflix); Diarra from Detroit – Diarra Kilpatrick (creator/executive producer); Kenya Barris, Miles Orion Feldsott, and Darren Goldberg (executive producers); Ester Lou and Mark Ganek (co-executive producers) (BET+); English Teacher – Brian Jordan Alvarez (creator/executive producer); Paul Simms, Jonathan Krisel, and Dave King (executive producers); Kathryn Dean, Jake Bender, and Zach Dunn (co-executive producers) (FX); Fantasmas – Julio Torres (creator/executive producer); Emma Stone, Dave McCary, Olivia Gerke, Alex Bach, and Daniel Powell (executive producers); Ali Herting (co-executive producer) (HBO)	Hollywood Black – Shayla Harris, Dave Sirulnick, Stacey Reiss, Jon Kamen, Justin Simien, Kyle Laursen, Forest Whitaker, Nina Yang Bongiovi, Jeffrey Schwarz, Amy Goodman Kass, Michael Wright, and Jill Burkhart (executive producers); David C. Brown and Laurens Grant (co-executive producers) (MGM+); Erased: WW2's Heroes of Color – Idris Elba, Johanna Woolford Gibbon, Jamilla Dumbuya, Jos Cushing, Khaled Gad, Matt Robins, Chris Muckle, Sean David Johnson, and Simon Raikes (executive producers); Annabel Hobley (co-executive producer) (National Geographic); Photographer – Elizabeth Chai Vasarhelyi, Jimmy Chin, Pagan Harleman, and Betsy Forhan (executive producers); Anna Barnes and Brent Kunkle (co-executive producers) (National Geographic); Ren Faire – Ronald Bronstein, Benny Safdie, Josh Safdie, Eli Bush, Dani Bernfeld, Lance Oppenheim, David Gauvey Herbert, Nancy Abraham, Lisa Heller, and Sara Rodriguez (executive producers); Abigail Rowe, Christian Vasquez, and Max Allman (co-executive producers) (HBO); Social Studies – Lauren Greenfield (creator/executive producer); Wallis Annenberg, Regina K. Scully, Andrea van Beuren, Frank Evers, and Caryn Capotosto (executive producers) (FX)
Best Lead Performance in a New Scripted Series	Best Supporting Performance in a New Scripted Series
Richard Gadd – Baby Reindeer as Donny Dunn (Netflix); Brian Jordan Alvarez – English Teacher as Evan Marquez (FX); Lily Gladstone – Under the Bridge as Cam Bentland (Hulu); Kathryn Hahn – Agatha All Along as Agatha Harkness (Disney+); Cristin Milioti – The Penguin as Sofia Falcone (HBO); Julianne Moore – Mary & George as Mary Villiers (Starz); Hiroyuki Sanada – Shōgun as Lord Yoshii Toranaga (FX); Anna Sawai – Shōgun as Toda Mariko (FX); Andrew Scott – Ripley as Tom Ripley (Netflix); Julio Torres – Fantasmas as himself (HBO)	Nava Mau – Baby Reindeer as Teri (Netflix); Tadanobu Asano – Shōgun as Kashigi Yabushige (FX); Enrico Colantoni – English Teacher as Grant Moretti (FX); Betty Gilpin – Three Women as Lina (Starz); Chloe Guidry – Under the Bridge as Josephine Bell (Hulu); Moeka Hoshi – Shōgun as Usami Fuji (FX); Stephanie Koenig – English Teacher as Gwen Sanders (FX); Patti LuPone – Agatha All Along as Lilia Calderu (Disney+); Ruth Negga – Presumed Innocent as Barbara Sabich (Apple TV+); Brian Tee – Expats as Clarke Woo (Prime Video)
Best Breakthrough Performance in a New Scripted Series	Best Ensemble Cast in a New Scripted Series
Jessica Gunning – Baby Reindeer as Martha Scott (Netflix); Diarra Kilpatrick – Diarra from Detroit as Diarra Brickland (BET+); Joe Locke – Agatha All Along as Billy Maximoff and Tommy Maximoff (Disney+); Megan Stott – Penelope as Penelope (Netflix); Hoa Xuande – The Sympathizer as The Captain (HBO)	How to Die Alone – Melissa DuPrey, Jaylee Hamidi, KeiLyn Durrel Jones, Arkie Kandola, Elle Lorraine, Michelle McLeod, Chris "CP" Powell, Conrad Ricamora, Natasha Rothwell, and Jocko Sims

==== Series with multiple nominations and awards ====
Series that received multiple nominations
Nominations	Series
5	Shōgun
4	Baby Reindeer
4	English Teacher
3	Agatha All Along
2	Diarra from Detroit
2	Fantasmas
2	Under the Bridge

Series that won multiple awards
Awards	Series
3	Baby Reindeer

== Special awards ==
=== John Cassavetes Award ===
- Girls Will Be Girls – Shuchi Talati (director/producer/writer); Richa Chadha and Claire Chassagne (producers)
  - Big Boys – Corey Sherman (director/producer/writer); Allison Tate (producer)
  - Ghostlight – Kelly O'Sullivan (director/writer); Alex Thompson (director/producer); Pierce Cravens, Ian Keiser, Chelsea Krant, Eddie Linker, and Alex Wilson (producers)
  - Jazzy – Morrisa Maltz (director/producer/writer); Lainey Shangreaux (writer/producer); Andrew Hajek and Vanara Taing (writers); Miranda Bailey, Tommy Heitkamp, John Way, Natalie Whalen, and Elliott Whitton (producers)
  - The People's Joker – Vera Drew (director/writer); Bri LeRose (writer); Joey Lyons (producer)

=== Robert Altman Award ===
(The award is given to the film's director, casting director, and ensemble cast)

- His Three Daughters – Director: Azazel Jacobs; Casting Director: Nicole Arbusto; Ensemble Cast: Jovan Adepo, Jasmine Bracey, Carrie Coon, Jose Febus, Rudy Galvan, Natasha Lyonne, Elizabeth Olsen, Randy Ramos Jr., and Jay O. Sanders

== Emerging Filmmakers Awards ==
=== Producers Award ===
The award honors emerging producers who, despite highly limited resources, demonstrate the creativity, tenacity and vision required to produce quality, independent films.

- Sarah Winshall
  - Alex Coco
  - Zoë Worth

=== Someone to Watch Award ===
The award recognizes a talented filmmaker of singular vision who has not yet received appropriate recognition.

- Sarah Friedland – Familiar Touch
  - Nicholas Colia – Griffin in Summer
  - Phạm Thiên Ân – Inside the Yellow Cocoon Shell

=== Truer than Fiction Award ===
The award is presented to an emerging director of non-fiction features who has not yet received significant recognition.

- Rachel Elizabeth Seed – A Photographic Memory
  - Julian Brave NoiseCat and Emily Kassie – Sugarcane
  - Carla Gutiérrez – Frida

== Milestones ==
The Best International Film winner Flow became the first animated feature to win a Film Independent Spirit Award for any category.

== See also ==
- 97th Academy Awards
- 82nd Golden Globe Awards
- 78th British Academy Film Awards
- 45th Golden Raspberry Awards
- 31st Screen Actors Guild Awards
- 30th Critics' Choice Awards
