= Keith Kupferer =

American actor

- Born: March 16, 1965 (age 61); West Orange, New Jersey, U.S.
- Occupation: Actor
- Years active: 1994–present
- Spouse: Tara Mallen (m. 1992)
- Children: Katherine Mallen Kupferer (daughter)

Keith Kupferer (born March 16, 1965) is an American actor. He is known for his work in Chicago theatre and for his supporting roles in film and television.

== Career ==
Keith film credits include Ghostlight (2024), in which he played the lead role of Dan Mueller, Widows (2018), The Dark Knight (2008), Stranger Than Fiction (2006), and Road to Perdition (2002).

Keith has worked in Chicago theatre since the mid-1990s. He is a founding member of Rivendell Theatre Ensemble. His theatre credits include productions at Steppenwolf Theatre Company such as The Great Leap, The Qualms, Good People, Middletown, and South of Settling. He has also performed at Goodman Theatre, Chicago Shakespeare Theater, Lookingglass Theatre Company, Northlight Theatre, Atlantic Theater Company, and more.

In 2024, The Chicago Tribune named Keith Chicagoan of the Year in Film.

== Personal life ==
Keith is married to actress Tara Mallen, and their daughter, Katherine Mallen Kupferer, is also an actress.

== Filmography ==
=== Film ===
Key
†	Denotes films that have not yet been released

Year	Title	Role	Notes
2002	Road to Perdition	Nitti's Henchman	
2006	Stranger Than Fiction	Demolition Foreman	
2006	Dirty Work	Victor	
2007	Fred Claus	Salvation Army Santa	
2008	The Merry Gentleman	Cop	
2008	Meet the Browns	Supervisor	
2008	The Dark Knight	Heckler	
2008	The Express	Small Fry Coach	
2009	Public Enemies	Agent Sopsic	
2009	October Surprise	Fake Yelburton	Short film
2011	The Dilemma	Bank Customer	
2014	The Secret Santa	Detective Mahoney	
2015	The Art Police	Detective Schister	
2015	Open Tables	Sam Meadows	
2016	Resurrecting McGinn(s)	Liam McGinn	
2017	Surprise Me!	Gregg	
2017	Written Off	Bill Dunlap	Short film
2017	Princess Cyd	Cyd's Dad	
2018	Not a Stranger	Will	
2018	When Jeff Tried to Save the World	Aaron	
2018	Widows	Leadman	
2020	Monuments	Grant Martin	
2021	Our Father	Keith	
2024	Ghostlight	Dan Mueller	
2024	American Schemers	Reed	
2025	They Rescue Horses, Don't They?	Ian	Short film
2026	Night Nurse	Detective Murphy	
2026	BRB	TBA	
2026	Via Negativa	Bruno	
2026	Crooks	The Fixer	

== Awards and nominations ==
Year	Result	Award	Category	Work	Ref.
2017	Nominated	Jeff Award	Supporting Actor In A Play	The Mystery of Love & Sex	
2018	Won	Jeff Award	Performer In A Supporting Role — Play	Cal in Camo	
2024	Won	Seattle International Film Festival	Best Performance	Ghostlight	
2024	Nominated	Chicago Film Critics Association Awards	Best Actor	Ghostlight	
2024	Nominated	Gotham Awards	Outstanding Lead Performance	Ghostlight	
2024	Nominated	Seattle Film Critics Society	Best Lead Actor	Ghostlight	
2024	Nominated	Georgia Film Critics Association	Best Actor	Ghostlight	
2025	Won	Satellite Awards	Best Actor in a Motion Picture	Ghostlight	
2025	Nominated	Film Independent Spirit Awards	Best Lead Performance	Ghostlight	
2025	Nominated	International Cinephile Society	Best Actor	Ghostlight	
