= Chicago Film Critics Association Award for Best Actor =

American acting award

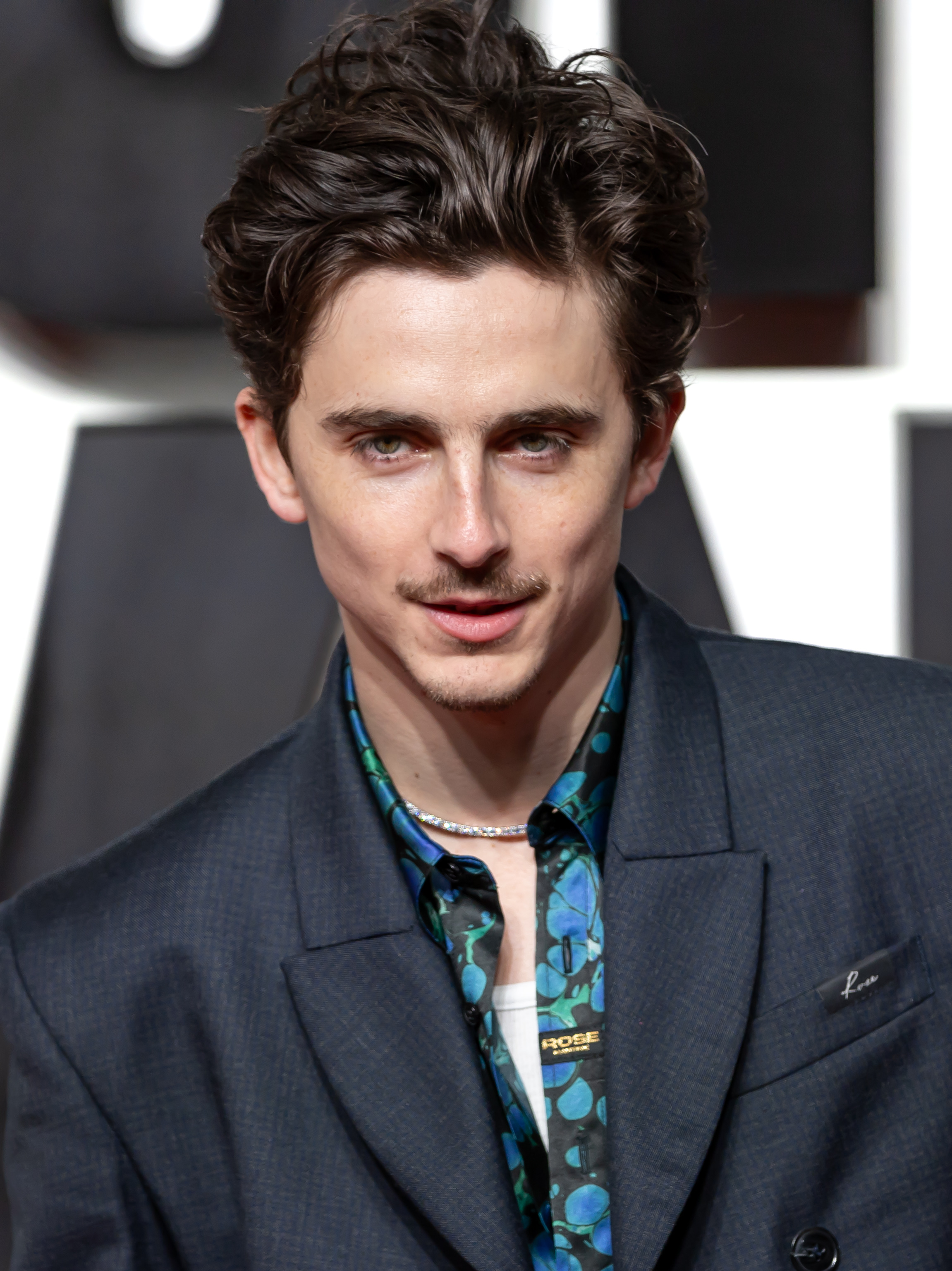
- The 2025 recipient: Timothée Chalamet
- Awarded for: Best Performance by an Actor in a Leading Role
- Country: United States
- Presented by: Chicago Film Critics Association
- First award: Jeremy Irons; Dead Ringers (1988)
- Currently held by: Timothée Chalamet; Marty Supreme (2025)
- Website: www.chicagofilmcritics.org

The Chicago Film Critics Association Award for Best Actor is an annual award given by the Chicago Film Critics Association.

== Winners ==
=== 1980s ===
Year	Winner and nominees	Film	Role
1988	Jeremy Irons	Dead Ringers	Beverly Mantle / Elliot Mantle
1989	Tom Cruise	Born on the Fourth of July	Ron Kovic
1989	Kenneth Branagh	Henry V	Henry V
1989	Daniel Day-Lewis	My Left Foot	Christy Brown
1989	Martin Landau	Crimes and Misdemeanors	Judah Rosenthal
1989	James Spader	Sex, Lies, and Videotape	Graham Dalton

=== 1990s ===
Year	Winner and nominees	Film	Role
1990	Jeremy Irons	Reversal of Fortune	Claus von Bülow
1991	Anthony Hopkins	The Silence of the Lambs	Hannibal Lecter
1991	Warren Beatty	Bugsy	Bugsy Siegel
1991	William Hurt	The Doctor	Dr. Jack MacKee
1991	Val Kilmer	The Doors	Jim Morrison
1991	Joe Mantegna	Homicide	Bobby Gold
1991	Nick Nolte	The Prince of Tides	Tom Wingo
1991	John Turturro	Barton Fink	Barton Fink
1992	Denzel Washington	Malcolm X	Malcolm X
1992	Robert Downey Jr.	Chaplin	Charlie Chaplin
1992	Clint Eastwood	Unforgiven	William 'Will' Munny
1992	Al Pacino	Scent of a Woman	Frank Slade
1992	Tim Robbins	The Player	Griffin Mill
1993	Liam Neeson	Schindler's List	Oskar Schindler
1993	Jeff Bridges	Fearless	Max Klein
1993	Daniel Day-Lewis	The Age of Innocence	Newland Archer
1993	Laurence Fishburne	What's Love Got to Do with It	Ike Turner
1993	Tom Hanks	Philadelphia	Andrew Beckett
1993	Anthony Hopkins	The Remains of the Day	James Stevens
1994	Tom Hanks	Forrest Gump	Forrest Gump
1994	Johnny Depp	Ed Wood	Ed Wood
1994	Samuel L. Jackson	Pulp Fiction	Jules Winnfield
1994	Tommy Lee Jones	Cobb	Ty Cobb
1994	John Travolta	Pulp Fiction	Vincent Vega
1995	Nicolas Cage	Leaving Las Vegas	Ben Sanderson
1995	Morgan Freeman	Seven	Detective Lt. William Somerset
1995	Anthony Hopkins	Nixon	Richard Nixon
1995	Sean Penn	Dead Man Walking	Matthew Poncelet
1995	Denzel Washington	Devil in a Blue Dress	Easy Rawlins
1996	Billy Bob Thornton	Sling Blade	Karl Childers
1996	Kenneth Branagh	Hamlet	Hamlet
1996	William H. Macy	Fargo	Jerry Lundegaard
1996	Liam Neeson	Michael Collins	Michael Collins
1996	Geoffrey Rush	Shine	David Helfgott
1996	Denzel Washington	Courage Under Fire	Lt. Colonel Nathaniel Serling
1997	Robert Duvall	The Apostle	Euliss Dewey/The Apostle
1997	Peter Fonda	Ulee's Gold	Ulysses 'Ulee' Jackson
1997	Ian Holm	The Sweet Hereafter	Mitchell Stephens
1997	Jack Nicholson	As Good as It Gets	Melvin Udall
1997	Al Pacino	Donnie Brasco	Benjamin 'Lefty' Ruggiero
1998	Ian McKellen	Gods and Monsters	James Whale
1998	Roberto Benigni	Life Is Beautiful	Guido Orefice
1998	Jim Carrey	The Truman Show	Truman Burbank
1998	Tom Hanks	Saving Private Ryan	Captain John H. Miller
1998	Edward Norton	American History X	Derek Vinyard
1999	Kevin Spacey	American Beauty	Lester Burnham
1999	Jim Broadbent	Topsy-Turvy	W. S. Gilbert
1999	Russell Crowe	The Insider	Jeffrey Wigand
1999	Richard Farnsworth	The Straight Story	Alvin Straight
1999	Denzel Washington	The Hurricane	Rubin "The Hurricane" Carter

=== 2000s ===
Year	Winner and nominees	Film	Role
2000	Tom Hanks	Cast Away	Chuck Noland
2000	Javier Bardem	Before Night Falls	Reinaldo Arenas
2000	Michael Douglas	Wonder Boys	Prof. Grady Tripp
2000	Mark Ruffalo	You Can Count on Me	Terry Prescott
2000	Geoffrey Rush	Quills	Marquis de Sade
2001	Gene Hackman	The Royal Tenenbaums	Royal Tenenbaum
2001	Russell Crowe	A Beautiful Mind	John Nash
2001	John Cameron Mitchell	Hedwig and the Angry Inch	Hansel Schmidt/Hedwig Robinson
2001	Guy Pearce	Memento	Leonard Shelby
2001	Denzel Washington	Training Day	Alonzo Harris
2001	Tom Wilkinson	In the Bedroom	Matt Fowler
2002	Daniel Day-Lewis	Gangs of New York	William "Bill the Butcher" Cutting
2002	Adrien Brody	The Pianist	Władysław Szpilman
2002	Nicolas Cage	Adaptation	Charlie and Donald Kaufman
2002	Hugh Grant	About a Boy	Will Freeman
2002	Jack Nicholson	About Schmidt	Warren R. Schmidt
2003	Bill Murray	Lost in Translation	Bob Harris
2003	Johnny Depp	Pirates of the Caribbean: The Curse of the Black Pearl	Captain Jack Sparrow
2003	Paul Giamatti	American Splendor	Harvey Pekar
2003	Ben Kingsley	House of Sand and Fog	Colonel Massoud Amir Behrani
2003	Sean Penn	Mystic River	Jimmy Markum
2004	Paul Giamatti	Sideways	Miles Raymond
2005	Philip Seymour Hoffman	Capote	Truman Capote
2005	Terrence Howard	Hustle & Flow	DJay
2005	Heath Ledger	Brokeback Mountain	Ennis Del Mar
2005	Joaquin Phoenix	Walk the Line	Johnny Cash
2005	David Strathairn	Good Night, and Good Luck	Edward R. Murrow
2006	Forest Whitaker	The Last King of Scotland	Idi Amin
2006	Leonardo DiCaprio	The Departed	Billy Costigan
2006	Ryan Gosling	Half Nelson	Dan Dunne
2006	Peter O'Toole	Venus	Maurice
2006	Will Smith	The Pursuit of Happyness	Chris Gardner
2007	Daniel Day-Lewis	There Will Be Blood	Daniel Plainview
2007	George Clooney	Michael Clayton	Michael Clayton
2007	Ryan Gosling	Lars and the Real Girl	Lars Lindstrom
2007	Frank Langella	Starting Out in the Evening	Leonard Schiller
2007	Viggo Mortensen	Eastern Promises	Nikolai Luzhin
2008	Mickey Rourke	The Wrestler	Randy Robinson
2008	Clint Eastwood	Gran Torino	Walt Kowalski
2008	Richard Jenkins	The Visitor	Walter Vale
2008	Frank Langella	Frost/Nixon	Richard Nixon
2008	Sean Penn	Milk	Harvey Milk
2009	Jeremy Renner	The Hurt Locker	SFC. William James
2009	Jeff Bridges	Crazy Heart	Bad Blake
2009	George Clooney	Up in the Air	Ryan Bingham
2009	Matt Damon	The Informant!	Mark Whitacre
2009	Michael Stuhlbarg	A Serious Man	Larry Gopnik

=== 2010s ===
Year	Winner and nominees	Film	Role
2010	Colin Firth	The King's Speech	King George VI
2010	Jeff Bridges	True Grit	Rooster Cogburn
2010	Jesse Eisenberg	The Social Network	Mark Zuckerberg
2010	James Franco	127 Hours	Aron Ralston
2010	Ryan Gosling	Blue Valentine	Dean
2011	Michael Shannon	Take Shelter	Curtis LaForche
2011	George Clooney	The Descendants	Matt King
2011	Jean Dujardin	The Artist	George Valentin
2011	Michael Fassbender	Shame	Brandon Sullivan
2011	Gary Oldman	Tinker Tailor Soldier Spy	George Smiley
2012	Daniel Day-Lewis	Lincoln	Abraham Lincoln
2012	John Hawkes	The Sessions	Mark O'Brien
2012	Denis Lavant	Holy Motors	Mr. Oscar
2012	Joaquin Phoenix	The Master	Freddie Quell
2012	Denzel Washington	Flight	Whip Whitaker
2013	Chiwetel Ejiofor	12 Years a Slave	Solomon Northup
2013	Bruce Dern	Nebraska	Woody Grant
2013	Oscar Isaac	Inside Llewyn Davis	Llewyn Davis
2013	Matthew McConaughey	Dallas Buyers Club	Ron Woodroof
2013	Robert Redford	All Is Lost	Our Man
2014	Michael Keaton	Birdman	Riggan Thomson / Birdman
2014	Benedict Cumberbatch	The Imitation Game	Alan Turing
2014	Jake Gyllenhaal	Nightcrawler	Lou Bloom
2014	David Oyelowo	Selma	Martin Luther King Jr.
2014	Eddie Redmayne	The Theory of Everything	Stephen Hawking
2015	Leonardo DiCaprio	The Revenant	Hugh Glass
2015	Christopher Abbott	James White	James White
2015	Michael Fassbender	Steve Jobs	Steve Jobs
2015	Eddie Redmayne	The Danish Girl	Lili Elbe / Einar Wegener
2015	Jason Segel	The End of the Tour	David Foster Wallace
2016	Casey Affleck	Manchester by the Sea	Lee Chandler
2016	Adam Driver	Paterson	Paterson
2016	Joel Edgerton	Loving	Richard Loving
2016	Colin Farrell	The Lobster	David
2016	Denzel Washington	Fences	Troy Maxson
2017	Timothée Chalamet	Call Me by Your Name	Elio Perlman
2017	Daniel Day-Lewis	Phantom Thread	Reynolds Woodcock
2017	James Franco	The Disaster Artist	Tommy Wiseau
2017	Gary Oldman	Darkest Hour	Winston Churchill
2017	Harry Dean Stanton	Lucky	Lucky
2018	Ethan Hawke	First Reformed	Ernst Toller
2018	Christian Bale	Vice	Dick Cheney
2018	Bradley Cooper	A Star Is Born	Jackson Maine
2018	Rami Malek	Bohemian Rhapsody	Freddie Mercury
2018	Joaquin Phoenix	You Were Never Really Here	Joe
2019	Adam Driver	Marriage Story	Charlie Barber
2019	Antonio Banderas	Pain and Glory	Salvador Mallo
2019	Robert De Niro	The Irishman	Frank Sheeran
2019	Joaquin Phoenix	Joker	Arthur Fleck / Joker
2019	Adam Sandler	Uncut Gems	Howard Ratner

=== 2020s ===
Year	Winner and nominees	Film	Role
2020	Chadwick Boseman	Ma Rainey's Black Bottom	Levee Green
2020	Riz Ahmed	Sound of Metal	Ruben Stone
2020	Anthony Hopkins	The Father	Anthony
2020	Delroy Lindo	Da 5 Bloods	Paul
2020	Steven Yeun	Minari	Jacob Yi
2021	Benedict Cumberbatch	The Power of the Dog	Phil Burbank
2021	Nicolas Cage	Pig	Robin "Rob" Feld
2021	Andrew Garfield	tick, tick... BOOM!	Jonathan Larson
2021	Hidetoshi Nishijima	Drive My Car	Yūsuke Kafuku
2021	Simon Rex	Red Rocket	Mikey Saber
2022	Colin Farrell	The Banshees of Inisherin	Pádraic Súilleabháin
2022	Austin Butler	Elvis	Elvis Presley
2022	Brendan Fraser	The Whale	Charlie
2022	Paul Mescal	Aftersun	Calum
2022	Bill Nighy	Living	Mr. Williams
2023	Paul Giamatti	The Holdovers	Paul Hunham
2023	Leonardo DiCaprio	Killers of the Flower Moon	Ernest Burkhart
2023	Cillian Murphy	Oppenheimer	J. Robert Oppenheimer
2023	Andrew Scott	All of Us Strangers	Adam
2023	Teo Yoo	Past Lives	Hae Sung
2024	Adrien Brody	The Brutalist	László Tóth
2024	Timothée Chalamet	A Complete Unknown	Bob Dylan
2024	Colman Domingo	Sing Sing	John "Divine G" Whitfield
2024	Ralph Fiennes	Conclave	Thomas Cardinal Lawrence
2024	Keith Kupferer	Ghostlight	Dan Mueller
2025	Timothée Chalamet	Marty Supreme	Marty Mauser
2025	Leonardo DiCaprio	One Battle After Another	Bob Ferguson
2025	Joel Edgerton	Train Dreams	Robert Grainier
2025	Ethan Hawke	Blue Moon	Lorenz Hart
2025	Michael B. Jordan	Sinners	Elijah "Smoke" Moore / Elias "Stack" Moore
2025	Wagner Moura	The Secret Agent	Marcelo Alves / Armando / Fernando (adult)
