= The Steel Harp =

- Directed by: Alex Thompson; Kelly O'Sullivan
- Written by: Kelly O'Sullivan
- Produced by: Chelsea Krant; Pierce Cravens; Alex Thompson; Tim Headington; Adam Kersh; Theresa Steele Page
- Starring: Kelly O'Sullivan; Lois Smith; Cherry Jones; Reed Birney
- Cinematography: Denis Lenoir
- Edited by: Mike S. Smith
- Music by: Gary Gunn
- Production companies: Ley Line Entertainment; Fusion Entertainment
- Country: United States
- Language: English

The Steel Harp is an upcoming American independent comedy film directed by Alex Thompson and Kelly O'Sullivan, and written by O'Sullivan. It stars O'Sullivan, Lois Smith, Cherry Jones, and Reed Birney.

== Premise ==
A 90-year-old woman who guards the Golden Gate Bridge meets Amy, a troubled young woman, on what should be her final patrol. Their winter encounter leads to a healing friendship.

== Cast ==
- Kelly O'Sullivan as Amy
- Lois Smith as Hanna
- Cherry Jones
- Reed Birney

== Production ==
In January 2024, it was announced Alex Thompson and Kelly O'Sullivan would develop their next film, alongside Mouse, titled The Steel Harp.

In August 2025, principal photography had wrapped, with Lois Smith, Cherry Jones, and Reed Birney revealed to have joined the cast. Denis Lenoir served as the cinematographer. Keri Shewmaker served as the production designer. Mike S. Smith edited the film.
