= Katherine Mallen Kupferer =

American actress

- Born: November 23, 2007 (age 18); Chicago, Illinois, U.S.
- Occupation: Actress
- Years active: 2014–present
- Parents: Keith Kupferer (father); Tara Mallen (mother)

Katherine Mallen Kupferer (born November 23, 2007) is an American actress.

== Early life and career ==
Katherine Mallen Kupferer was born in Chicago, Illinois, to Keith Kupferer, an American actor, and Tara Mallen, an American actress.

She began acting at the age of five, during a Chicago Shakespeare Theater's production of Gypsy. In 2018, Kupferer was seen in Widows, directed by Steve McQueen.

In 2023, she appeared in Are You There God? It's Me, Margaret., and she was cast in Ghostlight, alongside her parents.

In April 2025, it was revealed that she re-teamed with Alex Thompson and Kelly O'Sullivan on the coming-of-age drama film Mouse, which premiered at the 76th Berlin International Film Festival in February 2026.

== Filmography ==
=== Film ===
Key
†	Denotes films that have not yet been released

Year	Title	Role	Notes
2016	Fools	Vera's daughter	
2018	Widows	Gun Daughter	
2023	Are You There God? It's Me, Margaret.	Gretchen Potter	
2024	Ghostlight	Daisy Mueller	
2025	They Rescue Horses, Don't They?	Aubrey	Short film
2026	Mouse	Minnie Dunn	

=== Theater ===
Key
†	Denotes films that have not yet been released

Year	Title	Role
2014	Gypsy	Balloon Girl
2019	The Killing Game	Unknown
2026	Do Something Pretty	Phoebe
