= Another Day (2026 film) =

2026 film by Jeanne Herry

- French: Garance
- Directed by: Jeanne Herry
- Screenplay by: Jeanne Herry
- Produced by: Alain Attal; Nicolas Dumont; Hugo Sélignac
- Starring: Adèle Exarchopoulos; Sara Giraudeau; Rudgy Pajany
- Cinematography: Antoine Cormier
- Edited by: Laurence Briaud
- Music by: Pascal Sangla
- Production companies: Chi-Fou-Mi Productions; Trésor Films
- Distributed by: StudioCanal
- Release dates: 17 May 2026 (Cannes); 23 September 2026 (France)
- Running time: 120 minutes
- Country: France
- Language: French

Another Day (French: Garance) is a 2026 French drama film written and directed by Jeanne Herry. Starring Adèle Exarchopoulos, Sara Giraudeau, and Rudgy Pajany, it follows Garance (Exarchopoulos) as she struggles with alcoholism.

The film had its world premiere in the main competition of the 79th Cannes Film Festival on 17 May 2026, where it competed for the Palme d'Or and Queer Palm. It received mixed reviews from critics, but with special praise towards Exarchopoulos's performance. It was theatrically released in France by StudioCanal on 23 September 2026.

== Premise ==
Garance, a struggling actress with an alcohol addiction, embarks on an eight-year journey of self-transformation.

== Cast ==
- Adèle Exarchopoulos as Garance
- Sara Giraudeau as Pauline
- Rudgy Pajany as Ethan
- Raya Martigny
- Mathilde Roehrich
- Sara-Jeanne Drillaud

== Production ==
The film was merged from two subjects that writer-director Jeanne Herry had sought to make films about: alcohol addiction and struggling actors. To better understand the subject of alcohol addiction, she read books, listened to podcasts, and spoke to a woman about her experience with alcoholism. As a former actress herself, Herry was also able to draw on her own experiences, as well as the experiences of her actor friends, to write the film.

For the role of Garance, Herry reached out to actress Adèle Exarchopoulos, whom she had worked with on her 2023 film, All Your Faces. As the role was very demanding, Herry stated, "I needed a very strong actress, and Adèle is at the top of her game right now." To prepare for the role, Exarchopoulos studied Gena Rowlands's performances in John Cassavetes's films A Woman Under the Influence (1974) and Opening Night (1977). She also met with a support group of female former addicts at a hospital in Villejuif.

Principal photography began on 2 September 2025. Filming took place in and around Paris, as well as in Soulac-sur-Mer, Gironde. Filming was completed in early December 2025.

== Release ==
StudioCanal owns the international sales rights to the film. It had its world premiere in the main competition of the 79th Cannes Film Festival on 17 May 2026, where it will compete for the Palme d'Or. It received a theatrical release in France by StudioCanal on 23 September 2026.

It was screened in the Summer Screen Programme section of the 32nd Sarajevo Film Festival in August 2026.

== Reception ==
=== Critical response ===
On the review aggregator website Rotten Tomatoes, 50% of 18 critics' reviews are positive, with an average rating of 5.4/10. Metacritic, which uses a weighted average, assigned the film a score of 56 out of 100, based on 10 critics, indicating "mixed or average" reviews.

In his two-star review, Peter Bradshaw of The Guardian deemed the film "ripe but flimsy" and "a fundamentally implausible depiction of how to grapple with alcoholism". Several critics also noted that the film felt didactic and formulaic at times, with Ryan Lattanzio of IndieWire calling it "basically a slightly scuzzed-up cautionary movie of the week" and Tomris Laffly of Variety comparing it to "an after-school special". Zachary Lee of TheWrap assessed that, despite being "competently made and well-acted", the film lacks "enough of a visual or thematic identity to differentiate it from stories of a similar kind".

Critics commended Adèle Exarchopoulos's performance as Garance, including Jonathan Romney of Screen Daily, who called her "the beating heart" of the film and declaring her performance "remarkable for being so undemonstratively naturalistic", and Damon Wise of Deadline writing that her performance "steals [the] show".

=== Accolades ===
Award	Date of ceremony	Category	Recipient(s)	Result	Ref.
Cannes Film Festival	23 May 2026	Palme d'Or	Jeanne Herry	Nominated	
