= Saint Frances (film) =

2019 film directed by Alex Thompson

- Theatrical release poster
- Directed by: Alex Thompson
- Written by: Kelly O'Sullivan
- Produced by: James Choi; Pierce Cravens; Ian Keiser; Eddie Linker; Raphael Nash; Alex Thompson; Roger Welp
- Starring: Kelly O'Sullivan; Ramona Edith Williams
- Cinematography: Nate Hurtsellers
- Edited by: Alex Thompson
- Music by: Quinn Tsan; Alexander Babbitt
- Production companies: Easy Open Productions; Metropolitan Entertainment; Runaway Train; Visit Films
- Distributed by: Oscilloscope
- Release dates: March 11, 2019 (SXSW); February 28, 2020 (United States)
- Running time: 106 minutes
- Country: United States
- Language: English
- Budget: <$150,000
- Box office: $59,257

Saint Frances is a 2019 American comedy-drama film, directed by Alex Thompson, written by Kelly O'Sullivan and starring O'Sullivan, Ramona Edith Williams, Charin Alvarez, Lily Mojekwu and Max Lipchitz. The film received critical acclaim and was nominated for the Independent Spirit John Cassavetes Award in 2020.

== Premise ==
Bridget, an aimless 34-year-old, gets a summer job babysitting the rambunctious six-year-old Frances. Frances' mothers, Maya and Annie, have just had a baby boy, and Frances feels somewhat displaced by her new baby brother. Though Maya and Annie appear to be accomplished and responsible, there are fissures in their marriage, as Annie's lawyer job has her working long hours, and Maya is in a state of increasing postpartum depression. Meanwhile, Bridget has a fling with Jace, resulting in an unplanned pregnancy.

== Cast ==
- Kelly O'Sullivan as Bridget
- Ramona Edith Williams as Frances
- Charin Alvarez as Maya
- Lily Mojekwu as Annie
- Max Lipchitz as Jace
- Jim True-Frost as Isaac
- Mary Beth Fisher as Carol
- Francis Guinan as Dennis
- Rebecca Spence as Joan
- Bradley Grant Smith as Corey

== Release ==
The film was released in the United States on February 28, 2020.

=== Critical response ===
On the review aggregator website Rotten Tomatoes, the film holds an approval rating of 99% based on 102 reviews, with an average rating of 8.1/10. The website's critical consensus reads, "Saint Frances approaches an array of weighty issues with empathy, humor, and grace -- and marks star and writer Kelly O'Sullivan as a tremendous talent to watch." Metacritic, which uses a weighted average, assigned the film a score of 83 out of 100, based on 20 critics, indicating "Universal Acclaim".

Hau Chu of The Washington Post wrote "it's the push-and-pull between Bridget and Frances that is the poignant heart of the film...By the end, the authenticity of their bond feels so well-earned that you might not mind watching another movie about them growing up with each other." Chu also praised Ramona Edith Williams' performance and noted that "Thompson and O'Sullivan bring sensitivity and an observant touch to the weighty proceedings" of unplanned pregnancy and abortion. Sheila O'Malley of RogerEbert.com gave the film 3 and ½ out of 4 stars and commented, "It's truly refreshing to watch a film where nobody has anything figured out, where life proceeds messily and imperfectly. 'Saint Frances' is unpredictable in a very human way." She also praised the realistic inclusion of women's bodies and its depiction of periods and breastfeeding, saying "this is all so much a regular part of a woman's life it's almost banal (in real life, anyway), and yet it's rarely dealt with in film, and certainly not as forthrightly as it is here".

Writing for Variety, Peter Debruge said, "Saint Frances takes a stand in letting the character figure things out for herself, while illuminating those things — like pregnancy and her period — that she shouldn’t have to". David Rooney of The Hollywood Reporter wrote, "Thompson's direction and O'Sullivan's screenplay are more often characterized by their light touch than their missteps in a likeable film elevated by its crisp, summery look and warm score".

== Awards and nominations ==
Year	Award	Category	Result	Ref(s).
2020	Independent Spirit Awards	John Cassavetes Award	Nominated	
2019	SXSW Film Festival	Audience Award	Won	
2019	SXSW Film Festival	Special Jury Award	Won	
2019	SXSW Film Festival	SXSW Grand Jury Award	Nominated	
