= Crooks (film) =

- Promotional poster
- Directed by: Mickey Keating
- Written by: Mickey Keating
- Produced by: Veronica Barbosa; Eddie Linker; Gregory Thomas
- Starring: Angela Trimbur; Chase Williamson; Melora Walters; Keith Kupferer
- Cinematography: Mac Fisken; Edgar T. Gomez
- Edited by: Valerie Krulfeifer
- Music by: James Swanberg
- Production company: Missing Link Productions
- Release date: June 7, 2026 (Tribeca Festival)
- Running time: 76 minutes
- Country: United States
- Language: English

Crooks is a 2026 American drama thriller film written and directed by Mickey Keating. Filmed in October 2024, in Chicago, the film stars Angela Trimbur, Chase Williamson, Melora Walters, and Keith Kupferer.

The film premiered at the Tribeca Festival on June 7, 2026.

== Cast ==
- Angela Trimbur as Faye
- Chase Williamson as Johnny
- Melora Walters as Blanche
- Keith Kupferer as The Fixer

== Production ==
In May 2018, it was reported that Mickey Keating would be writing and directing a drama thriller film titled Crooks, with Juno Temple, Lena Headey, and Mark Kassen cast. It was then to be co-financed by Celluloid Dreams, Like Minded Entertainment and Monte Rosso Productions. Principal photography had wrapped in October 2024, in Chicago, with a new cast announced, after Temple, Heady, and Kassen exited the project, with Angela Trimbur, Chase Williamson, Melora Walters, and Keith Kupferer joining the cast.

== Release ==
Crooks premiered at the Tribeca Festival on June 7, 2026.
