= Rosalind Productions =

American production company

Rosalind Productions Inc. is an American production company focused on new and classic work on Broadway, Off-Broadway, and in film founded by Abigail Rose Solomon in 2005. The company produces projects with female characters who drive the main storyline as well as women-authored and women-directed works. Former television executive Jennifer Kranz serves as a long-time team member of the company as Executive Vice President of Creative Development and Production.

In 2023, Off-Broadway, the company provided production support to Keen Company for their revival of Pulitzer Prize winner Lynn Nottage's earliest works Crumbs from the Table of Joy, about a family living through the great migration. The company's most recent Broadway co-production is the revival of Funny Girl which originally starring Beanie Feldstein as Fanny Brice, Jane Lynch as Mrs. Brice, Tony-nominated Jared Grimes as Eddie Ryan and Ramin Karimloo as Nicky Arnstein. Lea Michele and Tovah Feldshuh assumed the roles of Fanny Brice and Mrs Brice respectively on September 6, 2022.

Rosalind co-produced Tony-nominated The Prom, featuring direction and choreography by Tony Award winner Casey Nicholaw, a book by Tony Award winner Bob Martin and Tony Award nominee Chad Beguelin, music by Tony Award nominee Matthew Sklar and lyrics by Chad Beguelin. The Prom was the first musical of the 2018-2019 Broadway season to be named a New York Times Critics' Pick and also received Best Musical nominations from The Drama League and Outer Critics' Circle. In 2019, Rosalind Productions also co-produced the gender-blind Broadway revival of King Lear, starring Tony Award winner Glenda Jackson, Tony Award winner Jayne Houdyshell and Ruth Wilson, who was nominated for a Tony Award for Best Featured Actress.

Rosalind Productions also co-produced the Tony-nominated revival of Edward Albee's Three Tall Women on Broadway starring Glenda Jackson, Laurie Metcalf, and Alison Pill. The show was nominated for six Tony Awards including Best Revival along with Drama Desk, Drama League and Outer Critics' Circle awards for Outstanding Revival. Jackson earned a Tony Award for Best Actress in a Play and Metcalf for Best Featured Actress in a Play.

In 2017, the company was Producing Associate for the Broadway musical War Paint, starring two-time Tony Award winners Patti LuPone as Helena Rubinstein and Christine Ebersole as Elizabeth Arden. The company also Associate Produced The Miracle Worker on Broadway in 2010.

Rosalind Productions regularly teams with not-for-profit theatre companies, partnering in 2017, 2018, and 2019 with Rattlestick Playwrights Theater to produce Diana Oh's My Lingerie Play as well as the New Songs Now unplugged concert series, Actors Who Write, TheaterJam and the F*ck!ng Good Plays Festival. My Lingerie Play was a Village Voice Must See for fall 2017, a New York Times Critics’ Pick, and part of BuzzFeed's "Best of 2017". Rosalind was also an In Association partner with Ars Nova on the original downtown production of Heather Christian's Oratorio for Living Things at the Greenwich House Theater. The musical was the winner of multiple awards and a New York Times Critics' Pick.

Off-Broadway: the New York Premiere of The Last Seder, the New York Premiere of A Splintered Soul and John Patrick Shanley's Savage in Limbo with The Platform Group'. In Los Angeles, Rosalind Productions lead-produced Misalliance, Proof and the World Premiere of Stages as well as As You Like It with Los Angeles Women's Shakespeare Company.

In film, the company is Associate Producer on Lilly, a story about fair pay activist Lilly Ledbetter.

The company is currently developing new projects for Broadway and Off-Broadway with not-for-profit theater companies as well as films.

== Filmography ==
Year	Title
2024	Cleo from 8:20 to 2:35
2024	Lilly
2026	Mouse
