= Ghostlight (2024 film) =

2024 film by Kelly O'Sullivan and Alex Thompson

- Theatrical release poster
- Directed by: Kelly O'Sullivan; Alex Thompson
- Written by: Kelly O'Sullivan
- Produced by: Ian Keiser; Alex Wilson; Pierce Cravens; Edwin Linker; Chelsea Krant; Alex Thompson
- Starring: Keith Kupferer; Dolly de Leon; Katherine Mallen Kupferer; Tara Mallen; Hanna Dworkin; Tommy Rivera-Vega; Alma Washington; H.B. Ward; Dexter Zollicoffer; Deanna Dunagan; Francis Guinan
- Cinematography: Luke Dyra
- Edited by: Mike S. Smith
- Music by: Quinn Tsan
- Production companies: Little Engine; Runaway Train
- Distributed by: IFC Films; Sapan Studio
- Release dates: January 18, 2024 (Sundance); June 14, 2024 (United States)
- Running time: 115 minutes
- Country: United States
- Language: English
- Box office: $767,934

Ghostlight is a 2024 American drama film directed by Kelly O'Sullivan and Alex Thompson from a screenplay by O'Sullivan. It stars Keith Kupferer as a middle-aged construction worker who unexpectedly joins a local theater's production of Romeo and Juliet. It also stars Dolly de Leon, Katherine Mallen Kupferer, Tara Mallen, Hanna Dworkin, Tommy Rivera-Vega, Alma Washington, H.B. Ward, Dexter Zollicoffer, Deanna Dunagan, and Francis Guinan.

The film had its world premiere at the Sundance Film Festival on January 18, 2024, and was theatrically released in the United States on June 14, 2024, by IFC Films and Sapan Studio. It received positive reviews from critics, with particular praise towards Kupferer's performance, and was named one of the top 10 independent films of 2024 by the National Board of Review. At the 40th Independent Spirit Awards, it was nominated for Best Lead Performance (for Kupferer) and the John Cassavetes Award.

== Plot ==
Construction worker Dan Mueller struggles with the disciplinary problems of his teenage daughter Daisy and the wrongful death lawsuit he is filing against Christine Hawthorne, the ex-girlfriend of his son Brian, who died by suicide. The stress causes him to assault a rude motorist on the job, which is witnessed by Rita, an actor at a community theater across the street. She invites him in to read for Lord Capulet in their upcoming production of Romeo and Juliet.

He begins soliciting advice from Daisy, a former actor who has lost her interest in theater, but things grow tense when his wife Sharon, a teacher and theater director at the local school, tries to build a garden over the site of Brian's suicide in their yard and he erupts at Daisy for walking over it. He returns to the theater, where he witnesses Rita, playing Juliet, strike the actor playing Romeo when he claims she is too old for the part. After witnessing Romeo and Juliet's suicide being acted out, he tells the cast about Brian's death, and Daisy and Sharon witness Rita embracing him outside the theater.

While Dan commits more time to the production and is cast as Romeo, he is put on mandatory leave at his job and lies to his family about his whereabouts. Daisy follows him to the theater, discovers the truth, and quickly bonds with the cast. When they arrive home, Sharon, having learned from Dan's coworker that he is on leave, accuses him of infidelity, forcing him to admit the truth. Moved by his talent, Sharon allows the cast to perform in the school's gym, and they decide to make the play a one night event with Daisy cast as Mercutio.

As the performance approaches, Dan struggles to perform Romeo's suicide and is encouraged by Daisy to think about Brian's feelings. At the deposition with the Hawthornes, Dan's testimony reveals that, on the night of Daisy's last play, Brian and Christine attempted suicide together because of her family moving and him not being allowed to go with her. Dan realizes that he blames himself instead of Christine and admits that she is not at fault, tanking the lawsuit and leaving Sharon furious that he wasted their money and prevented her and Daisy from properly grieving.

At the show, Dan and Rita move Sharon to tears with the ending, and while Romeo dies, Dan sees Brian in the shadows offstage. The Muellers embrace after the performance, attend the cast party together, and return home.

== Cast ==
- Keith Kupferer as Dan Mueller
- Dolly de Leon as Rita
- Katherine Mallen Kupferer as Daisy Mueller
- Tara Mallen as Sharon Mueller
- Hanna Dworkin as Lanora
- Tommy Rivera-Vega as Lucian
- Alma Washington as Moira
- H.B. Ward as Jonah
- Dexter Zollicoffer as Greg
- Lia Cubilete as Christine Hawthorne
- Bradley Grant Smith as Jim
- Deanna Dunagan as herself
- Francis Guinan as Janitor Fran
- Charin Alvarez as Principal Santos

== Production ==
Kelly O'Sullivan wrote the part of Dan for Keith Kupferer, whom she had previously worked with in a 2014 production of The Humans in Chicago, Illinois. Kupferer suggested his daughter Katherine Mallen Kupferer for the role of Daisy, who auditioned and landed the part, and his wife Tara Mallen was cast as Sharon shortly thereafter.

Co-directed by O'Sullivan and Alex Thompson, Ghostlight was shot and edited simultaneously in October 2023. It was produced by Thompson, Ian Keiser, Alex Wilson, Pierce Cravens, Edwin Linker, and Chelsea Krant.

== Release ==
The film had its world premiere at the Sundance Film Festival on January 18, 2024. A week later, IFC Films and Sapan Studio acquired North American rights to the film. It also screened at South by Southwest on March 10, 2024. It was released in the United States on June 14, 2024.

== Reception ==
On the review aggregator website Rotten Tomatoes, 99% of 102 critics' reviews are positive, with an average rating of 8.2/10. The website's consensus reads: "A small film that elicits a huge emotional response, Ghostlight is a deeply moving and superbly acted meditation on grief." Metacritic, which uses a weighted average, assigned the film a score of 83 out of 100, based on 21 critics, indicating "universal acclaim".

Richard Roeper of the Chicago Sun-Times called it "a quietly compelling film that shows how power of theater brings teens and parents together." Matt Zoller Seitz of RogerEbert.com wrote that the film "tests your patience early but becomes powerful as it goes along... Some of the elements that might initially seem odd become the source of great strength for the movie as drama."

Matthew Escosia of Film Geek Guy highlighted the film's nuanced storytelling in his review: "There’s beauty in the film’s gentle approach to telling the story of a family in mourning, particularly of a father restraining himself of vulnerability."

At the Seattle International Film Festival, the film won first runner-up for the Golden Space Needle Award, co-directors O'Sullivan and Thompson won the audience award for Best Directors, and Keith Kupferer won Best Performance.

== Accolades ==
| Award | Ceremony Date | Category | Recipients | Result | Ref. |
|---|---|---|---|---|---|
| Chicago Film Critics Association Awards | December 11, 2024 | Best Actor | Keith Kupferer | Nominated | |
| Gotham Awards | December 2, 2024 | Outstanding Lead Performance | Keith Kupferer | Nominated | |
| Independent Spirit Awards | February 22, 2025 | Best Lead Performance | Keith Kupferer | Nominated | |
| Independent Spirit Awards | February 22, 2025 | John Cassavetes Award | Kelly O'Sullivan (director/writer); Alex Thompson (director/producer); Pierce Cravens, Ian Keiser, Chelsea Krant, Eddie Linker, and Alex Wilson (producers) | Nominated | |
| Satellite Awards | January 26, 2025 | Best Motion Picture – Comedy or Musical | Kelly O'Sullivan and Alex Thompson | Nominated | |
| Satellite Awards | January 26, 2025 | Best Actor in a Motion Picture – Comedy or Musical | Keith Kupferer | Won | |
| National Board of Review Awards | January 7, 2025 | Top 10 Best Independent Films | | Won | |
| Seattle International Film Festival | May 19, 2024 | Golden Space Needle Award - Best Film | Kelly O’Sullivan, Alex Thompson | Runner-up | |
| Seattle International Film Festival | May 19, 2024 | Golden Space Needle Award - Best Director | Kelly O’Sullivan, Alex Thompson | Won | |
| Seattle International Film Festival | May 19, 2024 | Golden Space Needle Award - Best Performance | Keith Kupferer | Won | |
| Seattle International Film Festival | May 19, 2024 | Golden Space Needle Award - Best Performance | Katherine Mallen Kupferer | Runner-up | |
| San Diego Film Critics Society Awards | December 9, 2024 | Best Youth Performance (For a performer under the age of 18) | Katherine Mallen Kupferer | Nominated | |
| Georgia Film Critics Association | January 7, 2025 | Best Actor | Keith Kupferer | Nominated | |
| Greater Western New York Film Critics Association Awards | January 4, 2025 | Best Actor | Keith Kupferer | Nominated | |
| Seattle Film Critics Society | December 16, 2024 | Best Actor | Keith Kupferer | Nominated | |
| Seattle Film Critics Society | December 16, 2024 | Best Youth Performance | Katherine Mallen Kupferer | Nominated | |
