= Independent Spirit Award for Best Lead Performance =

Annual film award

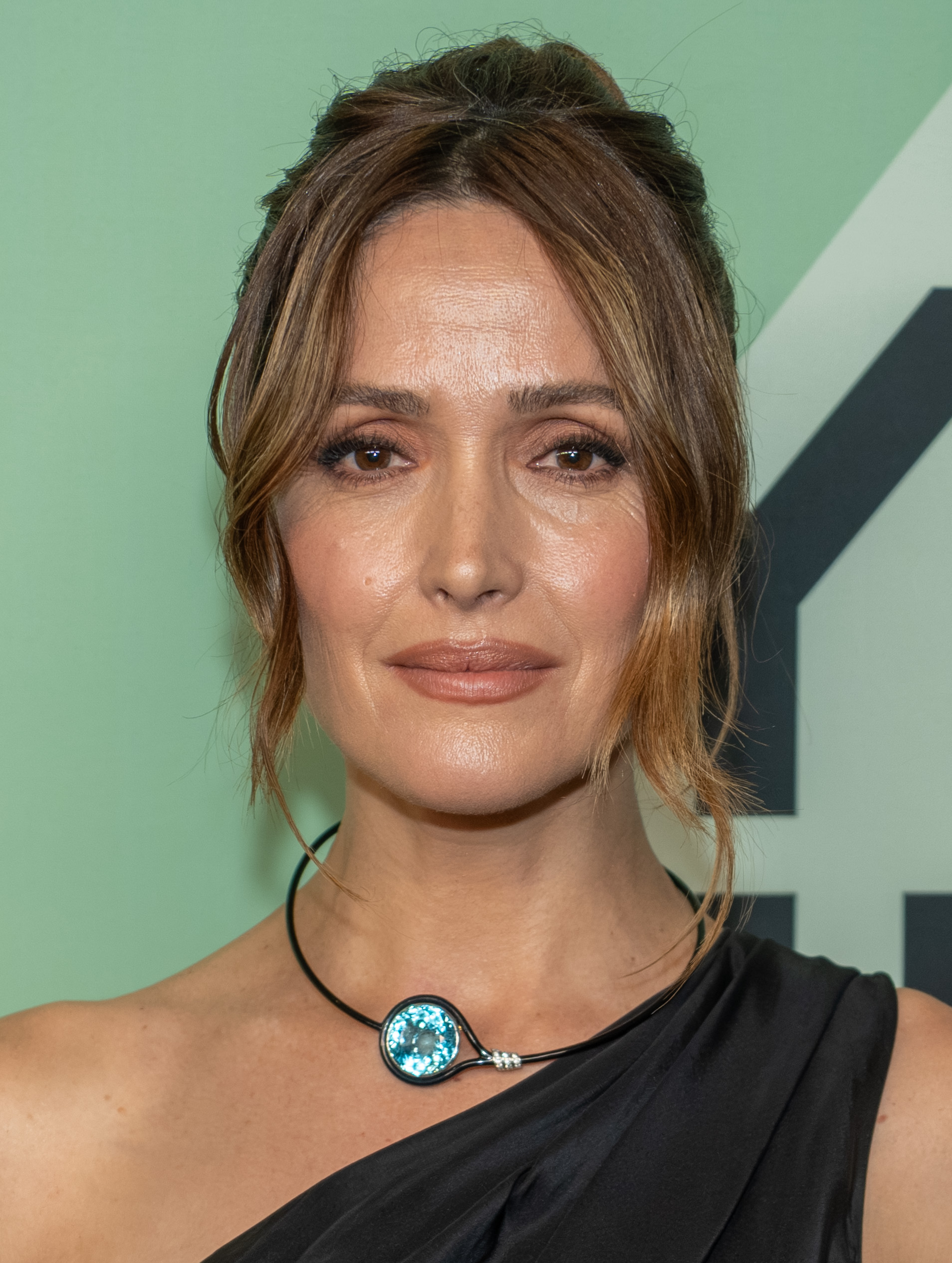
- The 2025 recipient: Rose Byrne
- Country: United States
- Presented by: Film Independent
- First award: 2022
- Currently held by: Rose Byrne for If I Had Legs I'd Kick You (2025)
- Website: filmindependent.org

The Independent Spirit Award for Best Lead Performance is one of the annual awards given out by Film Independent, a non-profit organization dedicated to independent film and independent filmmakers.

In 2022, the Independent Spirit Awards announced that the four acting categories would be retired and replaced with two gender neutral categories, with both Best Male Lead and Best Female Lead merging into the Best Lead Performance category.

== Winners and nominees ==
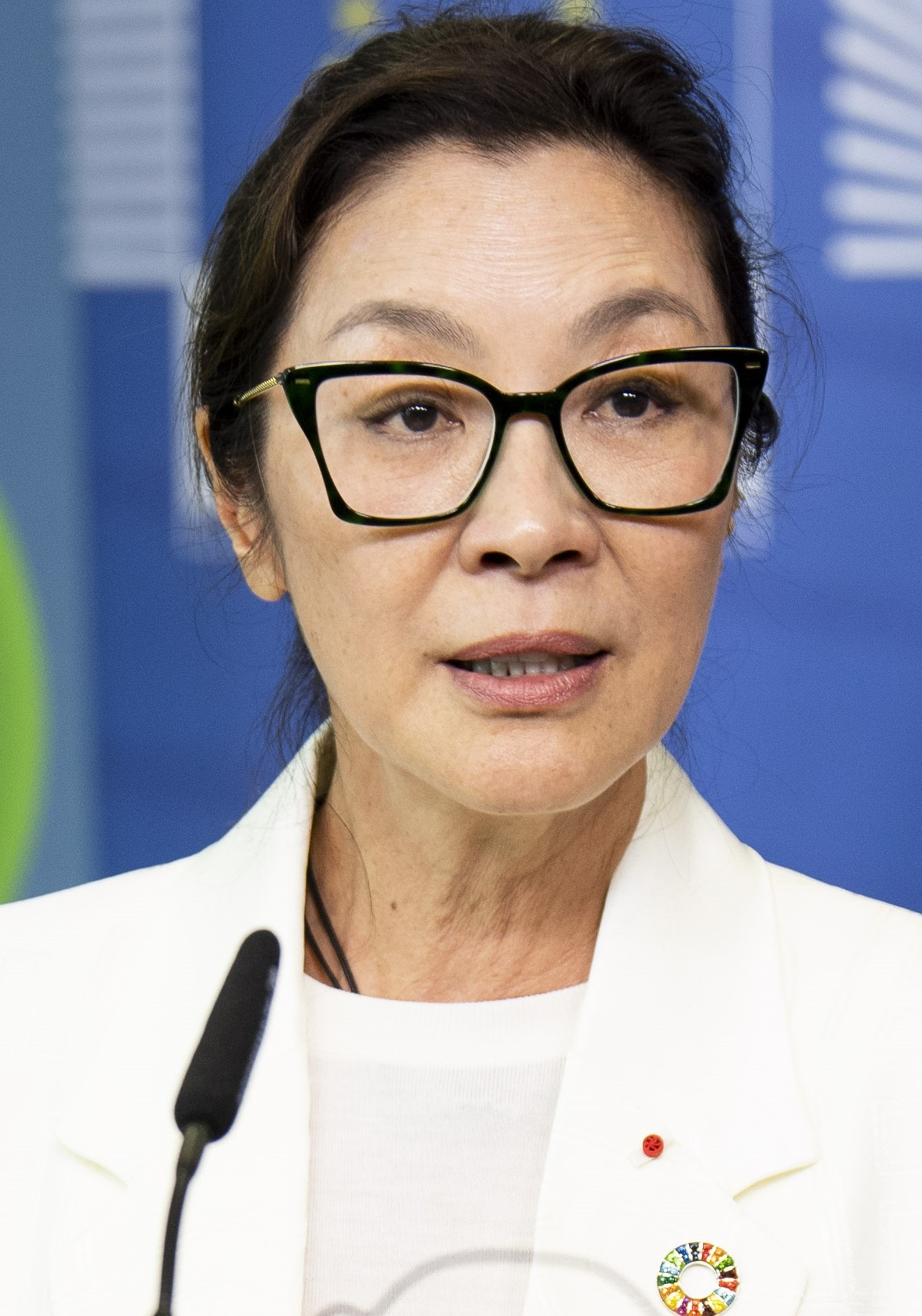
Michelle Yeoh was the first winner in this category for Everything Everywhere All at Once (2022).

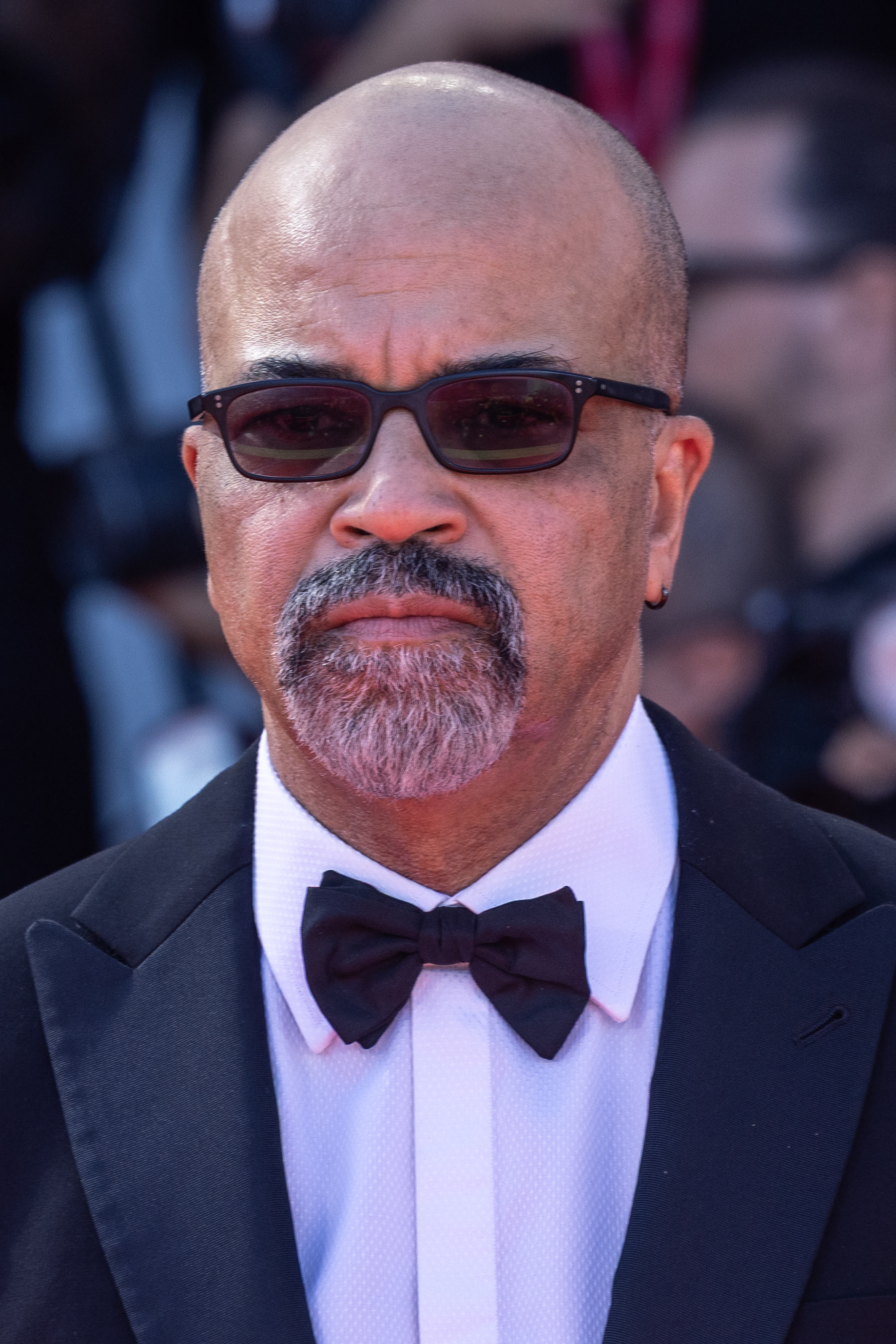
Jeffrey Wright won for American Fiction (2023).

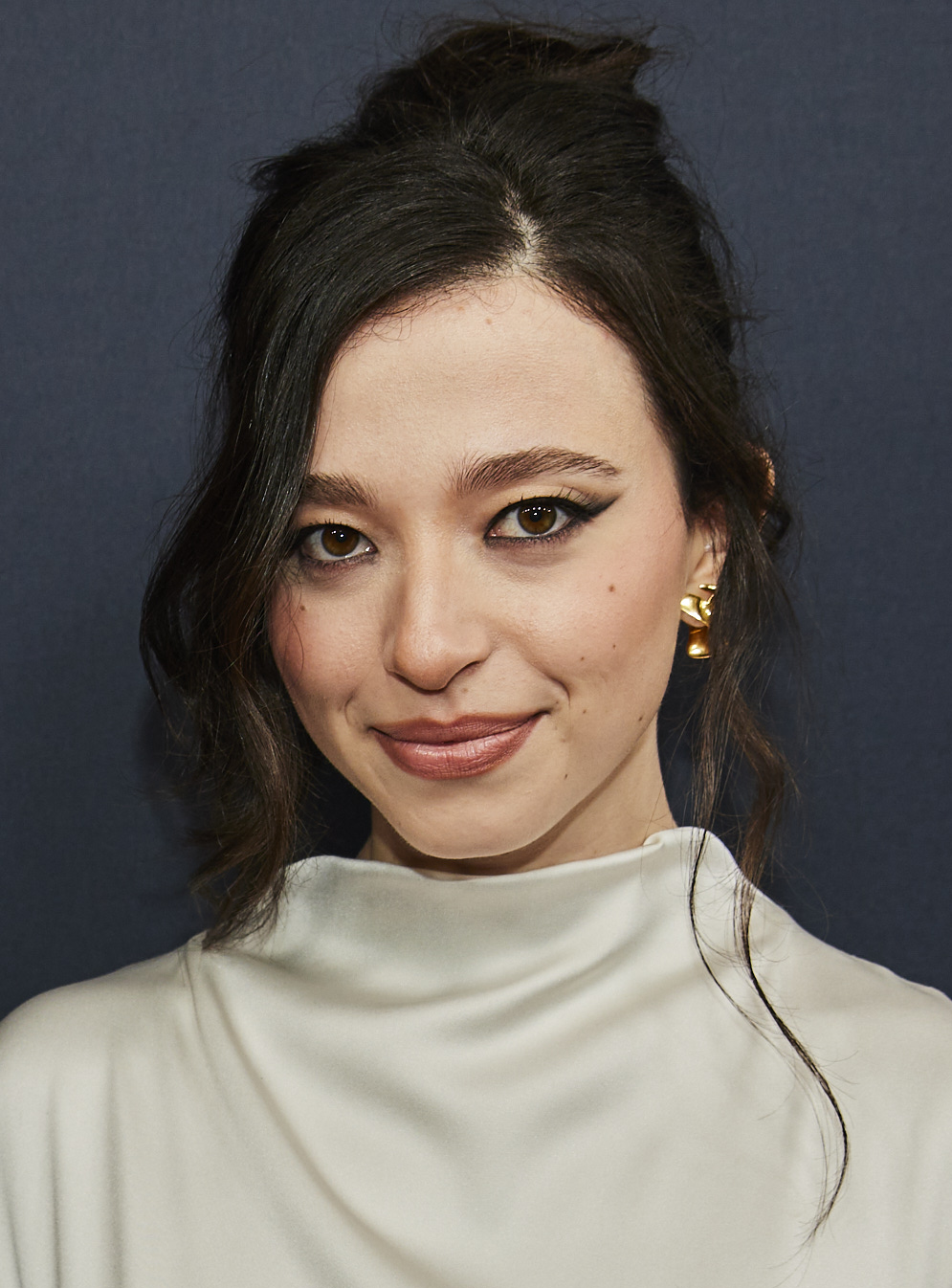
Mikey Madison won for Anora (2024).

=== 2020s ===
| Year | Actor | Film | Role |
|---|---|---|---|
| 2022 | Michelle Yeoh | Everything Everywhere All at Once | Evelyn Quan Wang |
| 2022 | Cate Blanchett | Tár | Lydia Tár |
| 2022 | Dale Dickey | A Love Song | Faye |
| 2022 | Mia Goth | Pearl | Pearl |
| 2022 | Regina Hall | Honk for Jesus. Save Your Soul. | Trinitie Childs |
| 2022 | Paul Mescal | Aftersun | Calum Paterson |
| 2022 | Aubrey Plaza | Emily the Criminal | Emily Benetto |
| 2022 | Jeremy Pope | The Inspection | Ellis French |
| 2022 | Andrea Riseborough | To Leslie | Leslie |
| 2022 | Taylor Russell | Bones and All | Maren Yearly |
| 2023 | Jeffrey Wright | American Fiction | Thelonious "Monk" Ellison |
| 2023 | Jessica Chastain | Memory | Sylvia |
| 2023 | Greta Lee | Past Lives | Nora Moon |
| 2023 | Trace Lysette | Monica | Monica |
| 2023 | Natalie Portman | May December | Elizabeth |
| 2023 | Judy Reyes | Birth/Rebirth | Celie |
| 2023 | Franz Rogowski | Passages | Tomas |
| 2023 | Andrew Scott | All of Us Strangers | Adam |
| 2023 | Teyana Taylor | A Thousand and One | Inez de la Paz |
| 2023 | Teo Yoo | Past Lives | Hae Sung |
| 2024 | Mikey Madison | Anora | Anora "Ani" Mikheeva |
| 2024 | Amy Adams | Nightbitch | Mother |
| 2024 | Ryan Destiny | The Fire Inside | Claressa "T-Rex" Shields |
| 2024 | Colman Domingo | Sing Sing | John "Divine G" Whitfield |
| 2024 | Keith Kupfefer | Ghostlight | Dan Mueller |
| 2024 | Demi Moore | The Substance | Elisabeth Sparkle |
| 2024 | Hunter Schafer | Cuckoo | Gretchen |
| 2024 | Justice Smith | I Saw the TV Glow | Owen |
| 2024 | June Squibb | Thelma | Thelma Post |
| 2024 | Sebastian Stan | The Apprentice | Donald Trump |
| 2025 | Rose Byrne | If I Had Legs I'd Kick You | Linda |
| 2025 | Everett Blunck | The Plague | Ben |
| 2025 | Kathleen Chalfant | Familiar Touch | Ruth |
| 2025 | Chang Chen | Lucky Lu | Lu Jia Cheng |
| 2025 | Joel Edgerton | Train Dreams | Robert Grainier |
| 2025 | Dylan O'Brien | Twinless | Roman / Rocky |
| 2025 | Keke Palmer | One of Them Days | Dreux |
| 2025 | Théodore Pellerin | Lurker | Matthew Morning |
| 2025 | Tessa Thompson | Hedda | Hedda Gabler |
| 2025 | Ben Whishaw | Peter Hujar's Day | Peter Hujar |
