= Tara Mallen =

American actress, director, and producer

Tara Mallen is an American actress, director, and producer based in Chicago. She is a founding member and Producing Artistic Director of the Rivendell Theatre Ensemble and has appeared extensively in Chicago theater as well as in film and television.

== Career ==
=== Theater ===
Mallen is a founding member and Producing Artistic Director of the Rivendell Theatre Ensemble, a Chicago-based theater company focused on new work and women driven storytelling. She has both produced and performed in numerous Rivendell productions, including Wrens, My Simple City, Holy Days, The Clink, and Faulkner's Bicycle.

She has also appeared in productions associated with the Steppenwolf Theatre Company, including the Jeff nominated world premiere productions of The Walls and Self Defense, or, The Death of Some Salesmen, which were presented as part of Steppenwolf's Visiting Theater Initiative.

Mallen received a Joseph Jefferson Award for Best Supporting Actress for her performance in Wrens and was later nominated for Best Actress in a Principal Role for My Simple City.

In film and television, Mallen has appeared in Steven Soderbergh's film Contagion (2011), the Starz series Boss, and the NBC series Chicago Fire and Chicago P.D..

In 2024, she starred in the independent feature Ghostlight (2024) along with her real life husband and daughter, which premiered at the 2024 Sundance Film Festival.

== Filmography ==
=== Film ===
Year	Title	Role	Notes
2011	Contagion	Minnesota Health #4	
2016	Fools	Vera	
2020	The Last Shift	Angry Customer	
2024	Ghostlight	Sharon Mueller	
2026	Mouse	Barbara Dunn	
2026	Via Negativa	Secretary	Completed
TBA	Winter Hymns	Bonnie	Post-production

=== Television ===
Year	Title	Role	Notes
2011	Boss	Hospital Administrator	1 episode
2014	Chicago P.D.	Renee Evans	1 episode
2015	Sense8	Day Nurse	1 episode
2018	Empire	Dr. Stein	1 episode
2024	Dark Matter	Alesia Cheney	1 episode
2024	The Emperor of Ocean Park	Yvonne	1 episode

== Education ==
Mallen graduated magna cum laude with a Bachelor of Fine Arts degree from Brooklyn College.

== Personal life ==
Mallen is married to actor Keith Kupferer. The couple has two children, Katherine Mallen Kupferer and Harper Douglas.
