= Mouse (2026 film) =

Film by Kelly O'Sullivan and Alex Thompson

- Theatrical release poster
- Directed by: Kelly O'Sullivan; Alex Thompson
- Written by: Kelly O'Sullivan
- Produced by: Chelsea Krant; Pierce Cravens; Alex Thompson; Bonnie Comley; Steven A. Jones; Ian Keiser; Stewart F. Lane; Abigail Rose Solomon; Alex Wilson
- Starring: Sophie Okonedo; Katherine Mallen Kupferer; Chloe Coleman; Tara Mallen; Beck Nolan; Iman Vellani; David Hyde Pierce
- Cinematography: Nate Hurtsellers; Luke Dyra
- Edited by: Mike S. Smith
- Music by: Hamilton Leithauser
- Production companies: Little Engine; Metropolitan Entertainment; Rosalind Productions; Runaway Train
- Distributed by: Independent Film Company; Sapan Studio
- Release dates: February 13, 2026 (Berlinale); November 6, 2026 (United States)
- Running time: 120 minutes
- Country: United States
- Language: English
- Budget: $3 million
- Box office: $150,810

Mouse is a 2026 American coming-of-age drama film directed by Kelly O'Sullivan and Alex Thompson, and written by O'Sullivan. It stars Sophie Okonedo, Katherine Mallen Kupferer, Chloe Coleman, Tara Mallen, Beck Nolan, Iman Vellani, and David Hyde Pierce.

The film premiered in the Panorama section of the 76th Berlin International Film Festival on February 13, 2026, and was released in the United States on November 6, 2026.

== Plot ==
In 2002, Minnie and Callie are high school juniors and best friends living in North Little Rock, Arkansas. Minnie is shy and from a blue-collar background, while Callie is outgoing and dreams of becoming a Broadway star. Callie, who comes from a wealthy family, often drives Minnie to school in her car. One morning, after a sleepover at Callie's house, Minnie walks to work; when she returns, she finds that Callie has died in a car accident. At the funeral, Minnie chooses not to speak.

Three months later, Minnie's senior year is soon to begin. At the video store, she realizes that she left a VHS of Titanic at Callie's house, and goes to retrieve it. She encounters Callie's mother Helen, a pianist who often played backup for Callie, and they talk. As school begins, another friend of Callie's, Cara, suggests dedicating their senior cabaret to Callie's memory, and while Minnie finds the idea distasteful at first, she resolves to sing a Broadway song. Helen agrees to coach and train her in singing.

Minnie and Helen discuss their grief over Callie's death; their relationship is turbulent but affectionate. At one point, Helen invites Minnie to dinner along with Cara and Callie's ex-boyfriend, and plays them a recording of a session she had with a medium in which Helen tried to contact Callie. Helen lets Minnie use Callie's car, stating that she should not walk alone after dark. Minnie begins dating a girl she meets at the video store, Kat, and has her first kiss. Minnie's mother, Barbara, a hard-working veterinary assistant, overhears one of their phone calls, but says nothing to Minnie. Helen helps Minnie prepare for the senior homecoming dance and gives her one of Callie's dresses to wear. After the dance, Minnie goes to a party at Cara's house with Callie's ex-boyfriend and gets drunk. Driving home, she swerves all over the road before braking suddenly in front of the light pole where Callie died, exiting the car and crying. Helen retrieves her and she spends the night at Callie's house in Callie's old room, but the incident leads to tension between Minnie and Helen, as well as between Minnie and Barbara.

Before the show, Minnie finds herself unable to sing at the dress rehearsal, but has a discussion on her anger and grief with the acting teacher, Mr. Murdaugh. At the cabaret, she sings enthusiastically but with little skill. Helen, in attendance, is overwhelmed and goes to leave, but is intercepted by Barbara. The two women argue before hugging and reconciling. After the show, Minnie introduces Kat to her mother before going to Callie's house to talk with Helen. They discuss what made Callie special and what Minnie sees as special about herself. Minnie leaves Callie's car keys behind and walks home, where, through the front window, she sees her mother talking to Kat warmly. She goes inside and hugs her mother.

== Cast ==
- Sophie Okonedo as Helen Bell
- Katherine Mallen Kupferer as Minnie Dunn
- Chloe Coleman as Callie Bell
- Tara Mallen as Barbara Dunn
- Beck Nolan as Brad Hugg
- Iman Vellani as Kat
- David Hyde Pierce as Mr. Murdaugh
- Addisyn Cain as Brandi Combs
- Audrey Grace Marshall as Cara
- Christopher R. Ellis as Mark Bell

== Production ==
In January 2024, it was reported that Alex Thompson and Kelly O'Sullivan were working on their next film titled Mouse. Principal photography began in Little Rock, Arkansas on September 16, 2024, and concluded in October 2024, with Sophie Okonedo, Katherine Mallen Kupferer, Chloe Coleman, Iman Vellani, David Hyde Pierce, Tara Mallen, Beck Nolan, Addisyn Cain, Audrey Grace Marshall, and Christopher R. Ellis. In January 2026, Visit Films had acquired the international sales rights to the film.

== Release ==
Mouse premiered at the Panorama section of the 76th Berlin International Film Festival on February 13, 2026. It screened at the Off Camera International Festival of Independent Cinema in Kraków, Poland, on April 27, 2026; at the Pink Apple and Jeonju International Film Festival on May 2 and 3, 2026, respectively; the 73rd Sydney Film Festival on June 8, 2026; and at the New Zealand International Film Festival on August 1, 2026. In May 2026, Independent Film Company and Sapan Studio acquired the distribution rights to the film. The film was released in limited theaters on November 6, 2026, before receiving a wide release in the United States on November 13.

== Reception ==
=== Critical response ===
On the review aggregator website Rotten Tomatoes, 100% of 82 critics' reviews are positive, with an average rating of 8.5/10. Metacritic, which uses a weighted average, assigned the film a score of 88 out of 100, based on 20 critics, indicating "universal acclaim".

Pete Hammond of Deadline Hollywood wrote that the film "has so much authenticity, the feel and smell of a suburban Southern town, the start of summer, a coming-of-age near the turn of a century, the search for your own identity lost in the shadow of a bigger personality, the meaning of being a true friend and finding a way forward when you discover that you are alone". Bilge Ebiri of Vulture noted the realistic portrayal of loss and grief, and the focus on the inevitable human messiness that follows. Cortlyn Kelly, writing for RogerEbert.com, gave the film four out of four stars and called the screenplay "outstanding".

=== Accolades ===
Award	Date of ceremony	Category	Recipient(s)	Result	Ref.
Berlin International Film Festival	February 20, 2026	Teddy Award	Kelly O'Sullivan and Alex Thompson	Nominated	
Berlin International Film Festival	February 20, 2026	Panorama Audience Award for Best Feature Film	Kelly O'Sullivan and Alex Thompson	Nominated	
Celebration of Cinema and Television	November 16, 2026	Supporting Actress Award – Film	Sophie Okonedo	Honored	
Gotham Independent Film Awards	November 30, 2026	Best Feature	Kelly O'Sullivan, Alex Thompson, Bonnie Comley, Pierce Cravens, Steven A. Jones, Ian Keiser, Chelsea Krant, Stewart F. Lane, Abigail Rose Solomon, Alex Thompson, Alex Wilson	Pending	
