= Rudgy Pajany =

French singer (born 1990)

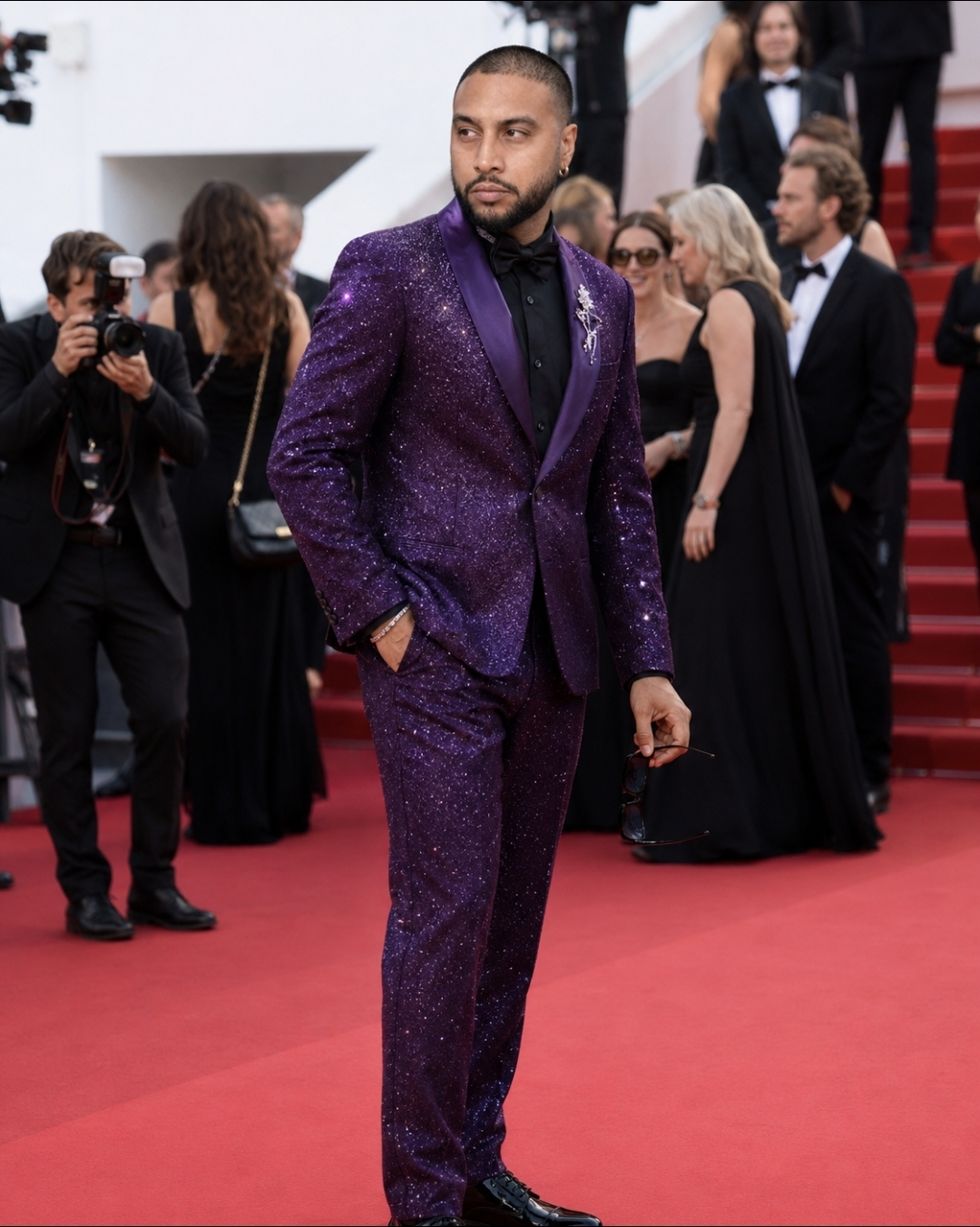
- Première festival de Cannes 2026

Background information
- Born: July 6, 1990 (age 36)
- Origin: Dakar, Sénégal
- Genres: Pop, French Variété, soul
- Occupation: Vocalist Actor
- Years active: 2013–present
- Label: Universal Music France

Rudgy Pajany (born Jérôme Pajany, on July 6, 1990 in Dakar) is a French singer and actor specialised in covers of 1960's, 1970's and 1980's songs. He is more particularly known for his titles Mistral Gagnant (out in 2013) and En Silence (out in 2015) On screen, he played the role of Naël in the Netflix series Brandi

== Biography ==
Rudgy Pajany has gained some international notoriety owing to diffusion through medias of the whole world (Italy, United States, France) of his Mistral Gagnant and En Silence covers.

In 2016 the album Pluie D'été was out, the first single of which was En Silence. This album also includes a song written by Hervé Vilard for Rudgy Pajany, J'ne serai jamais.

Alongside his music career, he has also pursued acting. He appeared in the film ''Bollywood Hero'' in 2009, followed by the short film ''L'Indien Boutique'' in 2017. His acting career gained further recognition in 2026 when he played the role of Naël in the Netflix series ''Bandi''. That same year, he was cast in two feature films selected for the Cannes Film Festival: ''Si tu penses bien'' directed by Géraldine Nakache, presented in the Cannes Première section, and a drama directed by Jeanne Herry, which was selected for the Official Competition.

== Discography ==
=== Albums ===
- Mes Jours (2014)
- Pluie d'été (2015)
- Pluie D'été édition spéciale (2018)

Next album (2018)

During his last interview at the radio station Chérie80’s, the artist announced his next album would be out in 2018.

=== Singles ===
- MIstral Gagnant (2013)
- La Bohème (2014)
- En Silence (2015)
- Objectif Terre (2015)
- Mon Amant de St Jean (2016)
- Maman (2017)

== Filmography ==
=== Film ===
==== Feature films ====
===== 2000s =====
- 2009: Bollywood Hero as Ranveer

===== 2010s =====
- 2017: L'Indien Boutique (Direct-to-video)
- 2018: Revenger: L'île de la mort as Azthor

===== 2020s =====
- 2024: Une vie rêvée as Daniel (voice)
- 2024: The Mehta Boys as Malek
- 2026: Si tu penses bien as Hudo Maunier
- 2026: Minotaure as Adrien
- 2026: Garance as Ethan
- 2026: Banquise as Vincent leons
- 2027: On Était des Loups as Maître pho
- 2027: Quasimodo as Noeh

==== Short films ====
- 2002: Courts mais Gay: Tome 3 as Parvi
- 2006: Courts mais GAY: Tome 12 as Parvi
- 2007: Courts mais GAY
