= Alex Thompson (filmmaker) =

American filmmaker

Alex Thompson is an American film director, producer, and screenwriter. He directed and produced Saint Frances (2019), which won the Audience Award and the Special Jury Award at 2019 SXSW Film Festival. He also produced and co-directed Ghostlight, which opened the 2024 Sundance Film Festival, along with his partner Kelly O'Sullivan, who wrote both screenplays. He was nominated for the Bingham Ray breakthrough director prize at the Gotham Awards in 2020.

Thompson was nominated for Best Feature at the 2026 Gotham Film Awards as one of the producers of Mouse.

== Personal life ==
Thompson grew up in Lexington, Kentucky and lives in Chicago with his partner Kelly O'Sullivan, with whom he shares a child.

== Filmography ==
| Year | Title | Director | Producer | Writer |
|---|---|---|---|---|
| 2019 | Saint Frances | Yes | Yes | No |
| 2021 | Our Father | No | Yes | No |
| 2022 | Rounding | Yes | Yes | Yes |
| 2024 | Ghostlight | Yes | Yes | No |
| 2026 | Mouse | Yes | Yes | No |
| TBA | The Steel Harp | Yes | Yes | No |
| TBA | Body of Work | Yes | TBA | TBA |
