= Kelly O'Sullivan =

American actress, screenwriter, and producer

- Born: 1983 or 1984 (age 42–43); Arkansas, U.S.
- Occupations: Actress, producer, screenwriter, director
- Writing career
- Years active: 2011–present
- Notable works: Saint Frances (2019); Ghostlight (2024); Mouse (2026)

Kelly O'Sullivan (born 1983/1984) is an American actress, screenwriter, director, and producer. She wrote and starred in Saint Frances (2019), which won the Audience Award and the Special Jury Award at 2019 SXSW Film Festival. She also wrote and co-directed Ghostlight, which premiered at the 2024 Sundance Film Festival.

== Biography ==
O'Sullivan was born and raised in Little Rock, Arkansas to an accountant mother and a father who worked in health insurance. She was raised Irish Catholic and attended Immaculate Conception school until eighth grade.

O'Sullivan always wanted to be an actor and, supported by her cinephile parents, she performed in local children's theatre plays from age five. She studied theatre at Northwestern University and is also an alumna of the Steppenwolf Theatre Company's School at Steppenwolf in Chicago.

Inspired by Greta Gerwig, who directed Lady Bird, O'Sullivan wrote Saint Frances based on the experiences she had while working as a nanny to support her struggling acting career in her twenties and an abortion she had in her early thirties. She started work on the script in January 2018, already intending the film to be directed by partner Alex Thompson. She wrote the parts for the lesbian parents in the film for actors Lily Mojekwu and Charin Alvarez.

In 2024, O'Sullivan co-directed, with Thompson, Ghostlight which had its world premiere at the 2024 Sundance Film Festival and was scheduled in June 2024 by IFC Films and Sapan Studio.

== Personal life ==
O'Sullivan is married to director Alex Thompson, with whom she has a son. She is an agnostic and a feminist. She has stated that her favourite film is Abbott and Costello Meet Frankenstein (1948).

== Filmography ==
=== Films ===
Year	Title	Role	Notes
2011	In Memoriam	Kelly	
2015	Henry Gamble's Birthday Party	Candice Noble	
2015	Sleep With Me	Rachel	
2016	Jessica	Pam	
2017	Ladies' Night	Kelly	Short, writer, executive producer, co-director
2018	Olympia	Becca	
2018	Not Welcome	Penelope	
2019	Saint Frances	Bridget	Writer, executive producer
2022	Cha Cha Real Smooth	Bella	
2022	Rounding	Dr. Kayla Matthews	
2022	My Summer Vacation	—N/a	Short film; director and writer
2023	The Graduates	Vicki	
2024	Ghostlight	—N/a	Director and writer
2026	Mouse	—N/a	Director, writer, and executive producer
TBA	The Steel Harp	Amy	Also director and writer
TBA	Body of Work	—N/a	Director and writer

=== Television ===
Year	Title	Role	Notes
2012	Battleground	Sarah	4 episodes
2012	The Mob Doctor	Annabelle Hanson	1 episode
2014–2015	Sirens	Valentina 'Voodoo' Dunacci	Recurring role (22 episodes)
2015	The History of Us	Katie	TV movie

=== Video games ===
Year	Title	Role	Notes
2014	Watch Dogs	Additional voices	Voice role
