= Toland =

Toland is a surname. Notable people with the surname include:

- Brook Toland (born 1992), American actress
- Christopher Toland (born 1985), American figure skater
- George Washington Toland (1796–1869), American politician
- Gregg Toland (1904–1948), American cinematographer
- Hugh Toland (1806–1880), American surgeon and academic
- John Toland (1670–1722), Irish-born rationalist philosopher and freethinker
- John Toland (born 1949), Irish mathematician
- John Toland (1912–2004), American author and historian
- Lee Toland Krieger (born 1983), American film director
- M. B. M. Toland (1925-1895), American poet and social leader; wife of Hugh Toland
- Mark Toland (born 1986), American magician
- Tank Toland (born 1973), American wrestler
- Tyler Toland (born 2001), Irish football player
