= Up in the Air =

Up in the Air may refer to:

== Literature ==
- Up in the Air (novel), a 2001 novel by Walter Kirn

== Film and television ==
- Up in the Air (1940 film), an American film directed by Howard Bretherton
- "Up in the Air", a 1992 episode of ChuckleVision
- Up in the Air (2009 film), an adaptation of the Walter Kirn novel, starring George Clooney
- "Up in the Air" (Eureka), a 2011 episode of Eureka

== Music ==
- "Up in the Air", a 1960 song by Johnny Preston
- "Up in the Air", a song by Hüsker Dü from their 1987 album, Warehouse: Songs and Stories
- Up in the Air, a 1995 album by the Silly Pillows
- Up in the Air (soundtrack), a soundtrack album from the 2009 film
- "Up in the Air" (song), a 2013 song by Thirty Seconds to Mars

== See also ==
- "Up in the Air, Junior Birdmen", a song for new aviators
