= Ted Levine =

American actor (born 1957)

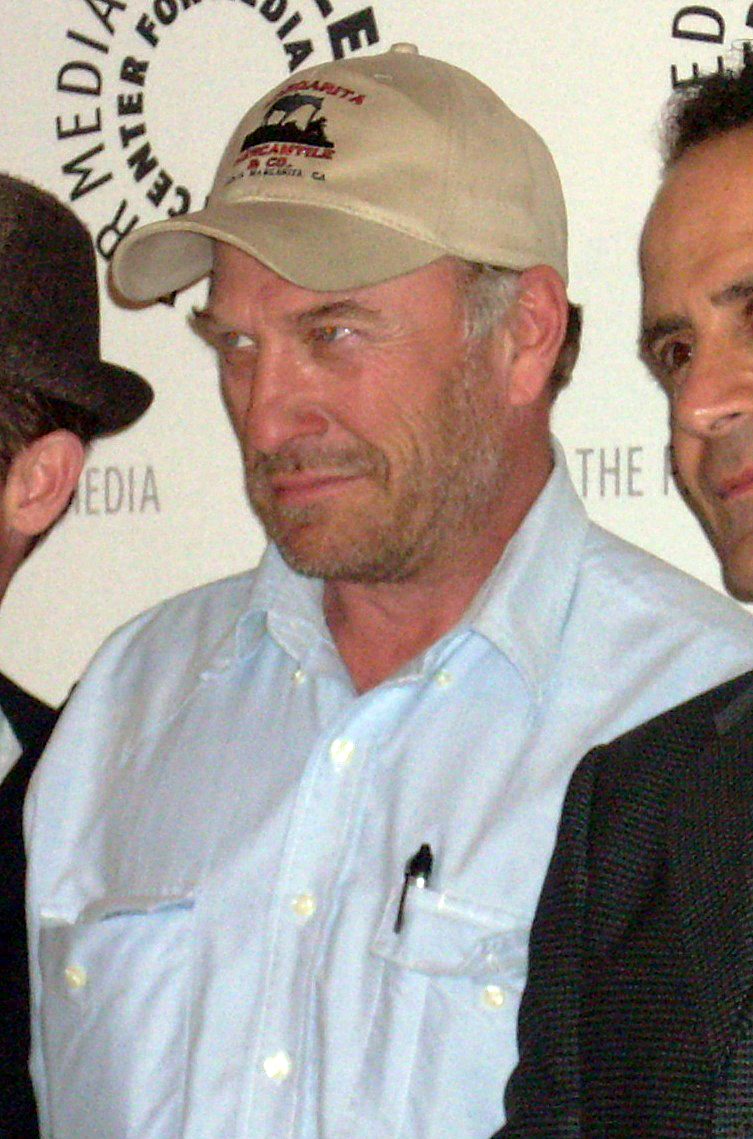
- Levine in 2008
- Born: Frank Theodore Levine; May 29, 1957 (age 69); Bellaire, Ohio, U.S.
- Education: Marlboro College
- Occupation: Actor
- Years active: 1978–present
- Partner: Kim Phillips (former)
- Children: 2

Frank Theodore Levine (born May 29, 1957) is an American actor. He is best known for his role as Jame Gumb, the serial killer "Buffalo Bill" in the film The Silence of the Lambs (1991). He was in the main cast of the television series Monk (2002–2009) as Leland Stottlemeyer.

Levine's other notable roles are in the films Nowhere to Run (1993), Heat (1995), Bullet (1996), The Fast and the Furious (2001), The Manchurian Candidate (2004), Memoirs of a Geisha (2005), American Gangster (2007), Shutter Island (2010), Jurassic World: Fallen Kingdom (2018), and The Report (2019).

== Early life ==
Levine was born in Bellaire, Ohio, the son of Charlotte Virginia (Clark) and Milton Dmitri Levine, who were both doctors and members of Physicians for Social Responsibility. Levine's father was of Russian-Jewish descent and his mother had Welsh and Native American ancestry. He describes himself as a "hillbilly Jew". He grew up in Oak Park, Illinois. In 1975, he enrolled at Marlboro College.

== Career ==
He became a fixture in the Chicago theatre scene and joined the Remains Theatre which was co-founded by Gary Cole and William Petersen. After his stage experience, Levine began to devote most of his energy during the 1980s toward finding roles in film and television. One of his most prominent roles in the 1980s was that of mob enforcer Frank Holman in the NBC drama Crime Story (1986–88).

After his breakout role in The Silence of the Lambs as primary antagonist Jame Gumb, there was a period where he was typecast in villainous roles. He was gradually able to branch out into other types of roles, such as a member of Al Pacino's police unit in Heat, and astronaut Alan Shepard in the HBO mini-series From the Earth to the Moon. In the drama Georgia, he played Mare Winningham's husband, one of his most sympathetic roles.

In 2001, Levine performed as Paul Walker's police superior Sergeant Tanner in The Fast and the Furious. He also had an uncredited role as the voice of sociopathic trucker "Rusty Nail" in Joy Ride, also starring Walker.

He played Detective Sam Nico in the 2003 film Wonderland, based on the gruesome murders in the Hollywood Hills. He also appeared as a psychiatrist at a mental institution in Wonderland, an unrelated 2000 TV series of the same name that aired briefly on ABC.

From 2002 to 2009, he co-starred as Captain Leland Stottlemeyer on USA Network's detective series Monk, starring Tony Shalhoub.

Levine provided the voice of the supervillain Sinestro in Superman: The Animated Series, Static Shock, Justice League, and Justice League Unlimited, all part of the DC Animated Universe.

Levine also appeared as a patriarch whose family takes a turn for the worse in the remake of The Hills Have Eyes (2006).

In 2007, he portrayed Sheriff James Timberlake in The Assassination of Jesse James by the Coward Robert Ford and appeared in Ridley Scott's American Gangster, alongside Denzel Washington and Russell Crowe.

In 2010, he appeared as the warden of the island prison in Shutter Island, starring Leonardo DiCaprio.

In 2012, he appeared as Sheriff Bloom Towne in Deep Dark Canyon, alongside Spencer Treat Clark and Nick Eversman, who portrayed Sheriff Towne's sons, Nate and Skylar, respectively.

In 2013, he had a major supporting role in the FX murder mystery series The Bridge as Lieutenant Hank Wade, commander of a police homicide unit in a Texas border city.

In 2014, he portrayed General Underwood in the British-Finnish action film Big Game.

In 2018, Levine co-starred in the sequel Jurassic World: Fallen Kingdom, as hunter Ken Wheatley.

From 2018 to 2020, he played Thomas F. Byrnes on the TNT series The Alienist.

In 2021, he joined the cast of the ABC drama Big Sky, playing the role of Horst Kleinsasser.

== Personal life ==
Levine has two children with girlfriend Kim Phillips; a son and a daughter.

== Filmography ==
=== Film ===
Year	Title	Role	Notes
1986	One More Saturday Night	Cop in Station	
1987	Ironweed	Pocono Pete	
1988	Betrayed	Wes	
1989	Next of Kin	Willy	
1990	Love at Large	Frederick King / James McGraw	
1991	The Silence of the Lambs	Jame 'Buffalo Bill' Gumb	
1992	The Paint Job	Kenny the D.J.	
1993	Nowhere to Run	Mr. Dunston	
1994	Todo cambia	Vince	
1995	The Mangler	Officer John Hunton	
1995	Georgia	Jake	
1995	Heat	Detective Mike Bosko	
1996	Bullet	Louis Stein	
1997	Mad City	Lemke	
1997	Switchback	Deputy Nate Booker	
1997	Flubber	Wesson	
1998	You Can Thank Me Later	Eli Cooperberg	
1999	Wild Wild West	General 'Bloodbath' McGrath	
2001	Evolution	General Russell Woodman	
2001	The Fast and the Furious	Sergeant Tanner	
2001	Joy Ride	'Rusty Nail'	Voice
2001	Ali	Joe Smiley	
2002	The Truth About Charlie	Emil Zadapec	
2003	Wonderland	Detective Sam Nico	
2004	The Manchurian Candidate	Colonel Howard	
2004	Birth	Mr. Conte	
2005	The L.A. Riot Spectacular	Tom Saltine	
2005	Memoirs of a Geisha	Colonel Derricks	
2006	The Hills Have Eyes	Bob 'Big Bob' Carter	
2007	The Assassination of Jesse James by the Coward Robert Ford	Sheriff James Timberlake	
2007	American Gangster	Captain Lou Toback	
2010	Shutter Island	Warden	
2012	Deep Dark Canyon	Bloom Towne	
2013	Jimmy	James Lee Mitchell	
2013	A Single Shot	Cecile	
2013	Banshee Chapter	Thomas Blackburn	
2014	Big Game	General Underwood	
2014	Dig Two Graves	Sheriff Waterhouse	
2014	Gutshot Straight	Lewis	
2015	Little Boy	Sam	
2016	Bleed for This	Lou Duva	
2017	Bottom of the World	The Preacher	
2017	Swing State	Rouge Holmes	
2017	A Midsummer Night's Dream	Theseus	
2018	Jurassic World: Fallen Kingdom	Ken Wheatley	
2019	The Report	John Brennan	
2019	A Violent Separation	Ed Quinn	
2026	Starbright	Bud	
TBA	Lear Rex	Earl of Kent	Post-production

=== Television ===
Year	Title	Role	Notes
1983	Through Naked Eyes	Patrolman	Television film
1984	The Killing Floor	Commander	American Playhouse television film
1985	Two Fathers' Justice	Bennett	Television film
1986–1988	Crime Story	Frank Holman	Recurring role
1989	The Fulfillment of Mary Gray	Jonathan	Television film
1990	Midnight Caller	Frank Brewer	Episode: "With Malice Towards One"
1991	Murder in High Places	Carson Russell	Television film
1991	Dead and Alive: The Race for Gus Farace	Charles Rose	Television film
1993	Death Train	Alex Tierney	Television film
1993	The Last Outlaw	Potts	Television film
1993	Broken Promises: Taking Emily Back	Gary Ward	Television film
1995	Nowhere Man	Dave 'Eddie' Powers	Episode: "Absolute Zero"
1996	Wiseguy	Paul Callendar	Television film
1997, 1999	Superman: The Animated Series	Karkull, Sinestro	Voice, 2 episodes
1997	Ellen Foster	Bill Hammond	Television film
1998	From the Earth to the Moon	Alan Shepard	2 episodes; miniseries
1998	Moby Dick	Starbuck	Main cast; miniseries
2000	Harlan County War	Silas Kincaid	Television film
2000	Wonderland	Dr. Robert Banger	Main cast
2002	Third Watch	Brian O’Malley	Episode: "Falling"
2002–2003	Justice League	Bulldozer, Sinestro	Voice, 4 episodes
2002–2009	Monk	Captain Leland Stottlemeyer	Main cast
2004	Static Shock	Sinestro	Voice, episode: "Fallen Hero"
2006	Justice League Unlimited	Sinestro	Voice, episode: "The Great Brain Robbery"
2011	Hell on Wheels	Captain Daniel Johnson	Episode: "Pilot"
2012	Luck	Isadore Cohen	Recurring role
2013–2014	The Bridge	Lt. Hank Wade	Main cast
2014	Child of Grace	Chief Edwards	Television film
2015	The Spoils Before Dying	Gerhart Moll	Episode: "The Trip Trap"; miniseries
2016	Dr. Del	Tanner	Television film
2016	Mad Dogs	Conrad Tull	2 episodes
2016	Ray Donovan	Bill Primm	4 episodes
2016	Lethal Weapon	Ned Brower	Episode: "Best Buds"
2018–2020	The Alienist	Thomas F. Byrnes	Recurring role
2018	Here and Now	Ike Bayer	2 episodes
2019	On Becoming a God in Central Florida	Obie Garbeau II	Main cast
2020	Peacock Presents: The At-Home Variety Show Featuring Seth MacFarlane	Captain Leland Stottlemeyer	Episode: "Monk In Quarantine"
2021	Big Sky	Horst Kleinsasser	Main cast (season 1)
2023	Mr. Monk's Last Case: A Monk Movie	Captain Leland Stottlemeyer	TV movie
2025	Mayfair Witches	Julien Mayfair	Recurring guest star (season 2); 4 episodes
2026	Something Very Bad Is Going to Happen	Boris	8 episodes
2026	Cape Fear	Brandon Devereaux	1 episode

== Awards and nominations ==
Year	Award/Event	Category	Nominated work	Result	Ref
1991	Awards Circuit Community Awards	Best Actor in a Supporting Role	The Silence of the Lambs	Nominated	
2008	Screen Actors Guild Award	Outstanding Performance by a Cast in a Motion Picture	American Gangster	Nominated	
2012	20/20 Awards	Best Supporting Actor	The Silence of the Lambs	Nominated	
2015	Beaufort International Film Festival	Best Actor	Dig Two Graves	Won	
