= Sad Brad Smith =

American musician & filmmaker

Bradley Grant Smith, also known professionally as Sad Brad Smith, is an American singer-songwriter, actor, and filmmaker. He gained recognition in 2009 for his song, "Help Yourself", which featured in the Oscar-nominated film Up in the Air, starring George Clooney and Anna Kendrick. He wrote, directed, and scored the 2021 film Our Father, which was nominated for the Grand Jury Award for Narrative Feature at the 2021 SXSW Film Festival.

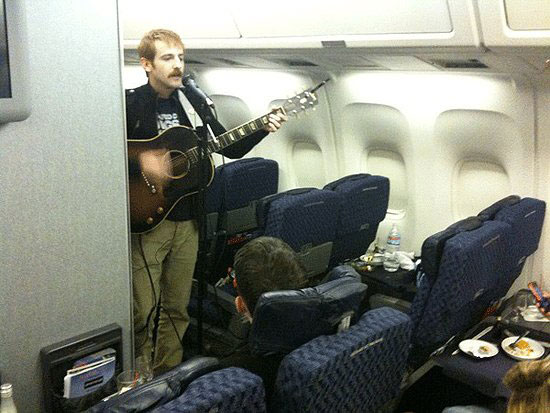
Sad Brad Smith performing on an airplane in 2009

== Career ==
While attending the wedding of friends Philip Sternberg and Catherine Reitman, Smith left a CD of home recordings in a mutual friend's car. After hearing them, Sternberg passed the recordings on to director Jason Reitman, thinking they might be right for his new film in pre-production, Up in the Air. A year later, Smith's song "Help Yourself" was placed in a pivotal scene at the emotional climax of the film.

Chicago Reader called it "the best thing about Up in the Air. . . it will probably break your heart." Oscar buzz for the song was strong, but "Help Yourself" was pulled from consideration by Paramount Pictures due to technicalities required by the Academy Awards, which some deemed arbitrary. Smith had been undiscovered up until that point and had not released any music prior to the film.

To coincide with the rapidly shifting timetable of the film's release, his debut album Love is Not What You Need appeared quickly, made up of 12 songs culled from the same home-sessions as "Help Yourself". A party and concert were held at Schubas, in Chicago, on January 23, 2011, to celebrate the physical release of Love is Not What You Need on vinyl, and Smith performed the album live, backed by a new band. In a review of the show, Consequence of Sound called the group "tight, talented, and entertaining," and observed that "Smith has a charming, low-key stage manner that quickly invites you in, and you can’t help but stay with him."

In 2014, he released the single "On the Beach," which was described by PopMatters as containing "a touch of ringing melody to sweeten his twangy folk sound," along with an official music video directed by Alex Thompson and starring legendary character actor Austin Pendleton. According to the Chicago Sun-Times, the 2014 album Magic expanded the song's sound to contain "early Beatles harmonies, traditional folk instruments, country guitar, and melting studio atmospherics [which] collectively create living cinema for your mind."

A frequent collaborator of Chicago filmmakers Alex Thompson and Kelly O'Sullivan, he most recently appeared on screen for them in their 2024 film Ghostlight, for which he also composed the children's song, "That's Enough."

== Discography ==
=== Sad Brad Smith ===
- 2009 - "Help Yourself" - Up in the Air (soundtrack)
- 2009 - Love is Not What You Need
- 2014 - Magic
- 2019 - Sweet Dream
- 2024 - From a Barn on an Island (Live at the Almanack Arts Colony)

== Filmography ==
=== As Director ===
Year	Title	Writer	Producer	Distributor
2021	Our Father	Yes	No	CINEDIGM

=== Select Acting Roles ===
Year	Title	Role	Director
2005	The Ice Harvest	Ronny	Harold Ramis
2006	Let's Go to Prison	Randy	Bob Odenkirk
2006	Stranger than Fiction	Student	Marc Forster
2013	Baby Crazy	Mike	Haroula Rose
2014	Bad Johnson	Former Best Friend	Huck Botko
2014	Dig Two Graves	Deputy Byron	Hunter Adams
2019	Working Man	Pastor Mark	Robert Jury
2019	Saint Frances	Corey	Alex Thompson
2019	Once Upon a River	Officer	Haroula Rose
2020	The Last Shift	Donte	Andrew Cohn
2022	Rounding	Dr. Mac MacLauren	Alex Thompson
2024	Ghostlight	Jim	Kelly O'Sullivan, Alex Thompson
