= Binny and the Ghost =

German youth-oriented TV series

- Also known as: Billie and the Ghost (UK)
- German: Binny und der Geist
- Genre: Crime; Mystery; Fantasy; Comedy
- Created by: Steffi Ackermann; Vivien Hoppe
- Music by: Jan Weigel
- Country of origin: Germany
- Original language: German
- No. of seasons: 2
- No. of episodes: 23

Production
- Producers: Steffi Ackermann; Nicole Springstubbe
- Production locations: Berlin; Potsdam
- Cinematography: Felix Novo de Oliveira; Felix Poplawsky; Benjamin Dernbecher; Moritz Anton; Raphael Beinder
- Editors: Ronny Mattas; Carsten Eder; Ann-Sophie Schweizer; Melanie Margalith
- Running time: 23–26 minutes
- Production company: UFA Fiction

Original release
- Network: Disney Channel Germany
- Release: 23 March 2013 – 15 May 2016

Binny and the Ghost (German: Binny und der Geist) is a German crime-mystery television series for children and teenagers, which was produced by UFA Fiction for the Walt Disney Company (Germany). The series was created by producer Steffi Ackermann and author Vivien Hoppe. The first episode of the series premiered in Germany on 23 March 2013 on Disney Channel. The series finale aired on Disney Channel in Germany on 15 May 2016. The plot of the series was concluded in the last episode.

== Plot ==
13-year-old Binny moves with her parents from Hamburg to Berlin into an ancient villa. There she discovers that her room is already inhabited by a 14-year-old ghost named Melchior. However, he doesn't know why he has been a ghost for over a hundred years. Melchior does not know the 21st century, and Binny does not understand Melchior, who was born in 1900. Finally, in order to get rid of the ghost that is completely upsetting her life, Binny decides to help Melchior uncover the secret about his past. Only in this way can Melchior be freed from his ghostly life. In the process, the two teenagers often get involved in dangerous situations and have to solve crimes together. Binny and Melchior help people as well as ghosts whose bodies are trapped in the human world as long as their last task is not fulfilled. And the Watch Hunters in particular want to prevent Binny and Melchior from discovering the truth about the magical watches and the spirit world.

== Production ==
=== Development ===
In 2012, the German Disney Channel convinced the US parent company Disney that they be allowed to produce their own series of programs. They searched for new ideas from independent production companies and were attracted by the pitch from teamWorx under the working title Binny und der Geist. The idea for the series came from the producer Steffi Ackermann and the author Vivien Hoppe, while casting was carried out by Daniela Tolkien. On 8 November 2012, the production of a pilot episode of Binny and the Ghost was confirmed. teamWorx became UFA Fiction in August 2013.

=== Filming ===
Shooting the pilot episode began on 9 November 2012 in Berlin and the surrounding area, followed by the first season of Binny and the Ghost. Filming of the first season continued until autumn 2014. The long timescale was due, among other reasons, to the availability of the main actors which was restricted to the school holidays. Filming of the second season began on 13 March 2015 and continued until the end of 2015. One episode of the second season was filmed in the zoo on the Reilsberg in Halle.

== Cast and characters ==
=== Main ===
- Merle Juschka as Binny Baumann, a teen girl who tries to help Melchior with different problems.
- Johannes Hallervorden as Melchior von und zu Panke, a friendly and funny teen ghost.
- Katharina Kaali as Wanda Baumann, Binny's mother.
- Steffen Groth as Ronald Baumann, Binny's father.
- Elisabeth Theun as Luca Schuster, Binny's friend and classmate.
- Stefan Weinert as Hubertus van Horas, the main antagonist of the first season.
- Stefan Becker as Bodo, Hubertus and Rhett's second-in-command.
- Robert Köhler as Rhett Thorn, the main antagonist of the second season.

=== Recurring ===
- Inga Busch as Steffi Schubert
- Anselm Bresgott as Mark
- Patrick von Blume as Principal Rötig
- Paul Maximilian Schüller as Martin
- Hoang Dang-Vu as Jan
- Lucas Reiber as Niklas Neudecker

== Episodes ==
=== Series overview ===
Series	Episodes	Originally released	
Series	Episodes	First released	Last released
1	13	23 March 2013	18 January 2015
2	10	10 April 2016	15 May 2016

=== Season 1 (2013–2015) ===
No. overall	No. in season	Title	Directed by	Written by	Original release date
1	1	"The Secret Roommate" "Der heimliche Mitbewohner"	Sven Bohse	Vivien Hoppe	23 March 2013
When 13 year old Binny and her family move into a creepy old mansion in Berlin, she finds out she shares her room with the ghost of a 14 year old boy who died a hundred years ago. His name is Melchior, and there’s only one way to get rid of this unwanted roomie: She has to help him solve crimes and right wrongs until he’s liberated from limbo. Suddenly mysterious things happen in the house and Binny and Melchior decide to find out what is going on...
2	2	"Poof Went the Weasel" "Und es hat Puff gemacht"	Nico Zingelmann	Vivien Hoppe	2 November 2014
Binny’s first day of school is approaching, and Melchior isn’t making things easier by being a nuisance. Despite him being there, Binny attempts to focus on her chemistry course. But then, she accidentally causes an explosion and the school has to be evacuated. While this is happening, someone steals the donations box out of the foyer. Binny and Melchior have to find out who the real thief is! Binny and Melchior also visit Melchiors family’s crypt at the cemetery, where they hope to find additional clues about Melchior’s mysterious past...
3	3	"Madame Boo" "Madame Buh"	Nico Zingelmann	Vivien Hoppe	9 November 2014
Binny and Melchior find a living relative of his: his cousin Albert who lives in a senior citizen’s home. Binny realizes that Melchior isn’t the only ghost she can see! Margarita, the deceased wife of Melchior’s cousin, explains to Binny that the pocket watch has opened up the door to the spirit world for Binny. At the same time a mysterious lady shows up at the senior citizen home pretending that she is able to get in contact with the ghostworld...
4	4	"A Dog and his Boy" "Auf den Hund gekommen"	Nico Zingelmann	Vivien Hoppe	16 November 2014
In the attic, Binny and Melchior find a watch case, in the base of which is hidden a key. Could the key lead them to a secret safety deposit box of Melchior’s parents, where they will learn more about Melchior’s past? Then they meet Oskar, a small ghost boy who is searching for his dog Caspar. Caspar seems to have disappeared, and it quickly becomes apparent that Caspar isn’t the only missing dog...
5	5	"Teamspirit" "Team-Geist"	Nico Zingelmann	Vivien Hoppe	23 November 2014
Binny and her friend Luca go to a school soccer match, and Luca’s cousin Jonas is one of the players on the team. But Binny can’t believe her eyes as she suddenly sees another soccer player slip into Jonas’ body! Jonas’ playing style becomes very aggressive and, going it alone, he misses a crucial goal. Binny and Melchior figure out that the ghost is soccer star Mats Müller, who is Jonas’ biggest idol. But Mats was involved in a betting scandal, which destroyed his good reputation. Binny and Melchior decide to take the case...
6	6	"Crash and Cash" "Bei Crash Cash"	Nico Zingelmann	Vivien Hoppe	30 November 2014
As Binny arrives at school, she sees her friend Mark, who is overjoyed that he just passed the test for his scooter license. Shortly after, Mark has an accident, but fortunately, Mark is not hurt although the scooter is a wreck and the car that Mark drove into has a huge dent. When it later turns out that the repairs will end up being much more expensive than initially thought, Binny becomes suspicious. She and Melchior head over to the body shop and make an interesting discovery...
7	7	"The Art Thief" "Der Kunstraub"	Nico Zingelmann	Vivien Hoppe	7 December 2014
Binny’s school class takes a field trip to the museum. It is also Wanda, Binnys mother’s, first day at work as a restorer for the museum. Suddenly, a security alarm sounds: the incredibly valuable Czar jewels, the highlight of the current exhibit, have disappeared along with three paintings – and Wanda was the last person in the room. Wanda is immediately suspended by the museum director until the case is solved. Binny and Melchior start investigating and find out more than one intriguing thing... at the same time the suspicious Hubertus is on their trail...
8	8	"Horse Play" "Aufs Pferd gekommen"	Nico Zingelmann	Vivien Hoppe	14 December 2014
Melchior and Binny are at the horse racing track to begin looking for Melchiors parents’ clue. Unfortunately the premises are huge and Melchior is a bit overwhelmed by the search. Binny gets hired as a stable girl where meets Niklas, a hunky boy who also works there and who wants to become a veterinarian. Binny and Niklas are getting along pretty well when one of the most successful and most expensive horses that Niklas looks after suddenly becomes very ill. The veterinarian finds that the horse has been poisoned, and Niklas is the main suspect since he is responsible for feeding the horses...
9	9	"The Pesky Posts" "Die Posting Pest"	Nico Zingelmann	Vivien Hoppe	21 December 2014
As Binny arrives at school, she notices that all of the students, including Luca, are staring into their cell phones, apparently watching a funny video. A mysterious "Big X" has sent the video to all the students: it shows Matze, another student there, making a fool of himself. Nobody knows who’s behind Big X. A short time later, Luca also receives a distressing photo of herself from Big X,. Big X demands money from her, otherwise he threatens to send the photo to the rest of the school. Binny and Melchior decide to take the case and find out who is behind this malicious campaign.
10	10	"In the Woods" "Im Wald"	Andy Fetscher	Vivien Hoppe	28 December 2014
Binny and Melchior are on the way to the von und zu Panke's old summer residence, where Melchior hopes to find the next clue that will lead him to the hidden keeperless watch. Suddenly Binny discovers in a ditch old barrels of industrial waste. It's an environmental scandal. The lady from the environmental protection office doesn't know what to do about it as there’s nothing she can do unless they catch the culprits red-handed. So Binny and Melchior decide to try and start to track down the criminals...
11	11	"The Prom" "Der Schulball"	Andy Fetscher	Vivien Hoppe	4 January 2015
Binny and Melchior head to the Rose Castle, where they hope to find the next clue of Melchiors parents. Meanwhile, Luca is very busy preparing the annual prom. Binny also runs into Niklas, the young stablehand she met while working at the race track. Luca sets Niklas up as Binny's date for the prom, which Melchior isn't happy about at all. Then the sprinkler goes off in the gym by accident, submerging the place. Binny decides to find the culprit. Finally, she and Melchior find the last clue and at night during the prom they hope to find the keeperless watch... but they are not alone....
12	12	"Lady Diamond" "Lady Diamond"	Andy Fetscher	Vivien Hoppe	11 January 2015
Luca saw Binny, Hubertus and Bodo in the Rose Castle garden and wants Binny to tell her what happened during the prom. Binny and Melchior finally have to decide whether they confide in Luca, revealing their big secret to her... Shortly after, Binny and Melchior discover an unsolved jewelry theft and decide to track down the initial culprits... meanwhile also Hubertus and Bodo pursue a new malicious plan...
13	13	"Ice, Ice, Binny" "Ice, ice, Binny"	Andy Fetscher	Vivien Hoppe	18 January 2015
It's Binny's birthday. Her parents tell her to go to the movies with Luca so they can prepare a surprise for that afternoon. Just then, Binny receives a strange text from Luca. But where is Luca? Next, Binny receives a video call from her, but before Luca can finish telling them she's alright, Hubertus interrupts her. He tells Binny and Melchior he'll free Luca in exchange for the two watches. Binny and Melchior have no choice and agree to hand over the watches.

=== Season 2 (2016) ===
No. overall	No. in season	Title	Directed by	Written by	Original release date
14	1	"Sunshine Manor" "Villa Sonnenschein"	Benedict Hoermann	Vivien Hoppe	10 April 2016
The lovely old house that was home to the Sunshine Mansion Kindergarten is being foreclosed on. Yet there was a will that specifically stated that the kindergarten was to inherit the house. At least that’s what the ghost who Binny and Melchior meet in the garden says. Can the two detectives find the will in time before the house is put on the auction block and demolished?
15	2	"School Break-In" "Einbruch in der Schule"	Bettina Blümer	Vivien Hoppe	17 April 2016
Binny can hardly wait to go to school: Monday marks the start of "Digital Week", when students will be testing tablet computers during classes! Even Melchior, who is less than enthusiastic about school, is envious. But when Principal Rötig is ready to hand out the tablets, he discovers the safe that held them is surprisingly empty. He’s also the only person with the combination to the safe. Is Principal Rötig the culprit? Can Binny and Melchior find the real thief and the stolen tablets?
16	3	"Creature From the Black Lagoon" "Das schwarze Froschmonster"	Benedict Hoermann	Vivien Hoppe	17 April 2016
A peregrinating penguin, a black frogman who climbs over zoo walls and a series of mysterious break-ins – something is foul in the Berlin Zoo. Can Binny and Melchior figure out who’s been hanging around the zoo at night? And why on earth are they doing so? And what does a mixed-up mackerel delivery have to do with all of this?
17	4	"Ready For My Close-Up" "Filmreif"	Benedict Hoermann	Vivien Hoppe	24 April 2016
Binny and Luca are shooting a film for school and Melchior is energetically assisting. But their film equipment suddenly gets stolen. Is a competing film team responsible for the sabotage? Or have the three friends made a very different enemy without even noticing?
18	5	"The Fake Fifty" "Nachts beim Minigolf"	Bettina Blümer	Vivien Hoppe	1 May 2016
All Binny and Luca wanted was to have a fun and relaxing day playing miniature golf with their friends Niklas and Mark – but without warning, they’re embroiled in a counterfeit money scam! Binny and Melchior head off in search of the frightful forgers.
19	6	"The Wrong Package" "Das falsche Paket"	Bettina Blümer	Vivien Hoppe	1 May 2016
Mark has fallen victim to a fraudulent sales site on the internet: instead of receiving a new smartphone, he ended up investing all of his savings in a bar of soap. Binny and Melchior’s attempt to find the thieves by tracing back the package at the post office proves a dead end. But then Binny has a simple but ingenious idea…
20	7	"The Treasure in the Castle" "Der Schatz in der Burg"	Andy Fetscher	Vivien Hoppe	8 May 2016
Searching for Watch Keeper coats-of-arms, Binny and Melchior meet the eccentric Elvira von Hammerfels at her family’s castle. She believes she saw the ghost of one of her ancestors, and said ghost even gave her a clue about a "golden treasure" hidden somewhere within the castle’s walls. But is there really a ghost in the castle, or is something else behind the supernatural appearances?
21	8	"Night in the Department House" "Nachts im Kaufhaus"	Andy Fetscher	Vivien Hoppe	8 May 2016
Luca’s mother Steffi, a policewoman, is caught leaving the department store, apparently having shoplifted a necklace. Binny, Melchior and Luca believe she’s being framed, so they sneak into the department store after closing hours so they can catch the real culprits.
22	9	"Leonina" "Leonina"	Andy Fetscher	Vivien Hoppe	15 May 2016
Searching for the Fire Watch, Binny and Melchior find a 300-year-old ghost girl who was imprisoned within the Fire Watch’s case. She has no idea how exactly she ended up in there, or even who she really is – she cannot remember anything. Can Binny and Melchior help her and uncover this secret, 300 years in the making?
23	10	"Rock Around the Clock" "Rock around the Clock"	Benedict Hoermann	Vivien Hoppe	15 May 2016
Binny and Melchior have finally figured out Rhett Thorn’s true identity. To defeat him, they now have to team up with a former adversary. It all comes down to just one question in the end: who is going to end up Lord of Time, the Watch Keepers, or the Watch Hunters?

== Release ==
Germany, Austria and Switzerland

The pilot episode of the series aired on 23 March 2013 on Disney Channel, which at the time was only available on pay TV. Season 1 first aired regularly from 26 October 2014 to 18 January 2015 on Disney Channel, which is now on free TV. The second and final season first aired on Disney Channel from 10 April 2016 to 15 May 2016. Seasons 1 and 2 were added to Disney+ on 23 October 2020.

Africa, Middle East and Balkans

The first season premiered on Disney Channel on 13 December 2014. Season 2 premiered on Disney Channel on 7 July 2016. In South Africa, seasons 1 and 2 were added to Disney+ on 18 May 2022.

UK and Ireland

The first season premiered on 27 July 2015 on Disney Channel under the title "Billie and the Ghost" and with a British-English dub. Season 2 premiered on Disney+ on 18 May 2022 and was released along with the first season under the title "Binny and the Ghost" and with English dubbing from the US.

United States and Canada

To date, the series has not been released in the United States or Canada.

== Awards and nominations ==
Year	Award	Category	Nominee	Result	Ref.
2013	Goldener Spatz	TV series or movies	Sven Bohse	Nominated	
2015	Goldener Spatz	TV series or movies (Episode: Horse Play)	Nico Zingelmann	Won	
2015	Weißer Elefant - Filmfest München	TV series or movies	Nico Zingelmann	Nominated	
2015	Weißer Elefant - Filmfest München	TV series or movies	Steffi Ackermann	Nominated	
2015	Weißer Elefant - Filmfest München	TV series or movies	Andy Fetscher	Nominated	
2015	Kinder-Medien-Preis - Der weiße Elefant	Best Newcomer Actor	Johannes Hallervorden	Won	
2015	Kinder-Medien-Preis - Der weiße Elefant	Best Newcomer Actress	Merle Juschka	Won	

== Trivia ==
- In the United Kingdom and Ireland, the first season of the series was broadcast on the Disney Channel under the title Billie and the Ghost. In the British-English dub of the first season, created specifically for these two territories, Binny was renamed Billie and Melchior was renamed Malcolm.
- In the eighth episode of the first season, one horse is named Maximus, which is a reference to the horse Maximus from Disney's animated film Tangled. Both horses have the same fearless and brave personality, but differ in coat color.
- The third episode of the second season was filmed at the Bergzoo in Halle (Saale). Famous backdrops were the Humboldt penguin enclosure, the predator house as well as the seal enclosure and the skull monkey tunnel near the zoo entrance.
