= Our Father (2021 film) =

- Directed by: Bradley Grant Smith
- Written by: Bradley Grant Smith
- Produced by: Ian Keiser; Alex Thompson; Steven Callas; Zoe Lubeck
- Starring: Baize Buzan; Allison Torem; Keith Kupferer; Austin Pendleton
- Cinematography: Nate Hurtsellers
- Edited by: Adrien Joyce
- Music by: Bradley Grant Smith
- Production companies: Easy Open Productions; Runaway Train
- Distributed by: Cinedigm
- Release dates: March 21, 2021 (South by Southwest Film Festival); October 5, 2021 (United States)
- Country: United States
- Language: English

Our Father is a 2021 American dark comedy film, written and directed by Bradley Grant Smith, and produced by Alex Thompson. It stars Baize Buzan, Allison Torem, Tim Hopper, Austin Pendleton, and Keith Kupferer.

The film had its world premiere at the SXSW Film Festival on March 21, 2021, and was released that same year in the US by CINEDIGM, as the first Fandor original, on October 5, 2021.

== Cast ==
- Baize Buzan as Beta Fohrman
- Allison Torem as Zelda Fohrman
- Tim Hopper as Henry
- Austin Pendleton as Jerry Fohrman
- Keith Kupferer as Keith Fohrman
- Corey Hendrix as Gerry
- Lance Baker as Adam Fohrman
- Guy Massey as Guy Fohrman
- Marilyn Dodds Frank as Pippa
- Joanna Maclay as Olive

== Awards and nominations ==
Year	Award	Category	Result	Ref(s)
2021	SXSW Film Festival	SXSW Grand Jury Award	Nominated	
2021	Lake County Film Festival	Jury Award Best Feature Narrative	Won	
