= Deep Dark Canyon =

- Theatrical release poster
- Directed by: Silver Tree; Abe Levy
- Written by: Silver Tree; Abe Levy
- Produced by: Brandon Barrera; Scott Tree; Silver Tree; Kathy Weiss
- Starring: Ted Levine; Spencer Treat Clark; Nick Eversman
- Cinematography: Dan Stoloff
- Edited by: Abe Levy
- Music by: James Weston
- Production company: Secret Identity Productions
- Distributed by: Colorfast Pictures
- Release date: October 19, 2012 (Theatrical)
- Running time: 89 minutes
- Country: United States
- Language: English

Deep Dark Canyon is a 2012 American independent dramatic thriller film by husband and wife writer/director team Abe Levy and Silver Tree. The film stars Ted Levine, Nick Eversman, and Spencer Treat Clark. The film was originally called Lawless and was shot on location in the rural town of Guerneville, California.

== Synopsis ==
Nate and Skylar, sons of sheriff Bloom Towne, are involved in the accidental death of Mayor Cavanaugh's son Dick in a hunting accident. Older brother Nate fired the deadly shot, but to protect him, younger Skylar, still a minor, takes the blame. Owning most of the town's businesses, the Cavanaugh family itself is wealthy and influential. In retaliation, the family uses their influence to have Skylar set to be tried as an adult, rather than as a minor. Desperate and filled with guilt, Nate breaks Skylar out of the county lock-up and, handcuffed together, the two escape into the local woods. Two deputies are killed in the escape and the Cavanaugh clan, deciding that the sheriff will be unable to act impartially, organize themselves into a search team with orders to shoot on sight. Sheriff Towne joins the search efforts in order to reach his sons before they are shot by others. He is forced to measure the major political debt he owes to the Mayor and the Cavanaugh family, against his oath to uphold the law and the love he has for his two sons.

== Cast ==
- Ted Levine as Sheriff Bloom Towne
- Spencer Treat Clark as Nate Towne
- Nick Eversman as Skylar Towne
- Martin Starr as Lloyd Cavanaugh
- Michael Bowen as Mayor Randy Cavanaugh
- Matthew Lillard as Jack Cavanaugh
- Justine Bateman as Cheryl Cavanaugh
- Greg Cipes as Guthrie Cavanaugh
- Abraham Benrubi as Michael Spencer
- Nicolas Christenson as Tony Cavanaugh
- Brandon Barrera as Eric Cavanaugh
- Micha Borodaev as Larry Cavanaugh
- Amaryllis Borrego as Roberta
- Greg Cipes
- Valentina de Angelis
- Nate Mooney
- Peter Coventry Smith
- Stacey Travis
- Blayne Weaver

== Production ==
Originally titled Lawless, the project was lensed by Daniel Stoloff, in Sonoma County, California, primarily at locations in Guerneville and along the Russian River. The film was renamed to avoid confusions with other films of the same title and to better reflect " the atmospheric, rural setting in which it takes place, namely Guerneville". The soundtrack includes songs written by Jacob Bercovici and performed by Wyoming. Silver Tree is from Guerneville and Abe Levy is from Petaluma.

== Release ==
By 8 November 2012, Deep Dark Canyon had been playing "scattered dates in individual U.S. markets".

== Reception ==
Film Threat gave an overall positive review for the film, stating that all of the actors "turn in solid performances that keep the movie grounded in reality". The Village Voice gave a mixed review, criticizing that the film "depletes itself with inter-location crosscutting" but that "Levine commands every scene he's in with great support from a subtle and soulful Martin Starr as his conflicted deputy".
