= Innocent (2009 film) =

- Directed by: Aram Rappaport
- Written by: Aram Rappaport
- Produced by: Aaron Becker; Alex Becker; M. Burkhardt; Alexander Mendoza; Kristi Motyka; Godrick Scott
- Starring: Alexa Vega; Austin O'Brien; Carlo Lorenzo Garcia; Nick Eversman; Circus-Szalewski; Brook Toland; Lathan Toland
- Release date: July 13, 2009
- Running time: 90 minutes
- Country: United States
- Language: English

Innocent, also known as Helix, is a 2009 American action drama film directed by Aram Rappaport, filmed in downtown Chicago, Illinois in one continuous take. There are no cuts in the filming. Innocent is one of the first ever feature-length films to be shot in one take, and it is a kidnapping thriller that circumnavigates downtown Chicago on foot and by car.

== Premise ==
In Chicago, five peoples' lives intersect in a real-time story.

== Cast ==
- Alexa Vega - Ashley
- Austin O'Brien - Jae
- Carlo Lorenzo Garcia - Johnny
- Nick Eversman - Shane
- Circus-Szalewski - Bum
- Brook Toland - Punky
- Lathan Toland - Teen
- David Hernandez - Ray Martinez
- Samantha Long - Kristi

== Production ==
Shooting took place in downtown Chicago around Lake Michigan.
