= Dig Two Graves =

- Film poster
- Directed by: Hunter Adams
- Written by: Hunter Adams; Jeremy Phillips
- Produced by: P.J. Fishwick; Claire Connelly
- Starring: Ted Levine; Samantha Isler; Danny Goldring; Troy Ruptash; Bradley Grant Smith
- Cinematography: Eric Maddison
- Edited by: Scott D. Hanson
- Music by: Brian Deming; Ryan Kattner; Joe Plummer
- Distributed by: Area 23a
- Release dates: October 17, 2014 (New Orleans Film Festival); March 24, 2017 (United States)
- Running time: 85 minutes
- Country: United States
- Language: English

Dig Two Graves is a 2014 independent gothic thriller written by Hunter Adams and Jeremy Phillips, and is Adams' first full-length feature as director. The film was executive produced by actor and director Larry Fessenden. Members of its crew were selected by the Independent Filmmaker Project, by working with the Southern Illinois University film department, and by involving the community of the film's Southern Illinois location. The film's cast includes Ted Levine, Samantha Isler, Danny Goldring, and Troy Ruptash.

The film, distributed by Area 23, released in select theaters and on demand March 24, 2017.

== Plot ==
In the 1940s, Deputy Waterhouse and Sheriff Proctor drive to a nearby quarry with two bodies stowed in their truck. Waterhouse takes a necklace off one of the bodies and they dump the two corpses into the water. Waterhouse then holds Proctor at gunpoint and demands he get rid of his badge, telling Proctor that he's no longer fit to be sheriff. Proctor throws his badge over the cliff.

In the 1970s, Jacqueline Mathers, called Jake, and her brother Sean head to the quarry. Sean insists she gets over her fear of jumping into the water below and offers to jump with her. Sean jumps but Jake becomes scared and lets go of Sean's hand at the last second. Jake watches as her brother plunges into the water below but doesn't resurface. In a panic, she runs for help, tripping along the way and gashing her forehead, which leaves a large scar. Deputy Freeman informs Waterhouse, now the sheriff, that his grandson has drowned in the quarry.

Jake suffers from survivor's remorse and falls into depression. A boy at school named Willie Proctor, the grandson of the old sheriff, has a crush on her and draws her pictures, much to the disapproval of his grandfather. Some months later, Jake's parents tell her they're going to have a baby which upsets Jake. The next day, Jake runs into three gypsy brothers led by Wyeth. Wyeth tells her he has the power to bring her brother back but someone will have to die in his place. The brothers take her back to their cabin on Proctor's property and make a blood oath with Jake - they'll bring her brother back if she pushes Willie Proctor over the quarry edge. She agrees. When she returns home after dark, her parents question her about where she's been. She tells them three men took her to their cabin. Waterhouse takes Jake to the cabin and asks Jake to identify the three brothers but, remembering her oath, Jake says she's never seen them before.

Jake convinces Willie to follow her to the quarry. She's about to push him over but is filled with guilt and decides not to. Jake's mother attempts to make Jake feel better by taking her to dinner where Jake is confronted by Wyeth. Jake says "she won't kill someone". Wyeth tells Jake that her grandfather has something of his and he wants it back. Jake finds her mother crying, having seen a boy who reminded her of Sean. Jake goes to her grandfather's house and steals the necklace he's been hiding.

The next day, Wyeth and his brothers confront Jake's mother at her home. She becomes frightened and blood begins to pour from between her legs. Later, Waterhouse is told by the doctor that his daughter will live but the baby can't be saved. Filled with remorse, Jake brings the necklace to Wyeth who tells her she can only bring Sean back if she sacrifices Willie. He puts the necklace around her neck. Waterhouse arrests the three gypsy brothers and takes them to jail. A desperate Jake convinces Willie to follow her to the quarry one more time. Meanwhile, haunted by memories, a drunken Proctor begins to douse the gypsy's cabin with alcohol. Waterhouse goes to the jail to find Deputy Freeman with his throat cut and the brothers escaped. An enraged Waterhouse drives to the cabin only to be shot by Proctor. Waterhouse shoots back and they both lie dying as the brothers return home. Wyeth tells Waterhouse that he's about to have his revenge.

In a series of flashbacks we see the events that led to the opening scene. A younger Sheriff Proctor witnesses the gypsy family, living on his property, engaging in strange rituals. He threatens the mother with arrest unless she pays him. When she says they have no money, he sexually assaults her. Deputy Waterhouse sees Wyeth and his frightened brothers, then only children, outside. Waterhouse finds Proctor raping the boys' mother. Proctor returns to the cabin with food only to be confronted by the husband who beats him and runs him off. Proctor returns with Waterhouse and kills the father. As Waterhouse protests, the mother shoots at the two policemen. Waterhouse shoots back and fatally wounds her. Proctor shoots the father in the head and aims at Wyeth before Waterhouse stops him. Wyeth kneels over his mother, who whispers something to him before dying. Waterhouse and Proctor then take the two bodies to the quarry.

Back in the 1970s, Wyeth tells Waterhouse that he knows Jake is about to push Willie into the quarry, setting herself up for a lifetime of pain and regret. Waterhouse says he knows she won't do it. Waterhouse asks if he knows the old saying about revenge - "Before you embark on a journey of revenge, dig two graves." Waterhouse then throws his lit cigar onto the alcohol-soaked floor which sets the cabin aflame, killing the brothers, Proctor, and himself in the process. As they die, Waterhouse and Wyeth embrace each other as they once did when Proctor raped the mother, apparently forgiving each other in the process.

Jake struggles to push Willie. When she realizes that Wyeth only said "someone" had to die, Jake jumps herself and lands in the water. She sees the figure of her brother below her. Sean swims up to her and pulls the necklace from around her neck before disappearing into the depths. Jake hears Willie calling to her from above as she swims back to the surface.

== Cast ==
- Ted Levine as Sheriff Waterhouse
- Samantha Isler as Jake Mather
- Danny Goldring as Proctor
- Troy Ruptash as Wyeth
- Rachael Drummond as Mrs. Waterhouse
- Bradley Grant Smith as Deputy Byron Freeman
- Dean Evans as Jon
- Gabriel Cain as Willie Proctor

== Production ==
=== Development ===
The film began as a short called Jake's Choice, filmed in northeast Wisconsin. The intention was for it to provide a fundraising tool, but as director Hunter Adams admitted to I Am Entertainment Magazine, it chiefly "helped [him] clarify the visual and aural design of the film".

=== Independent Filmmaker Project ===
In 2013, the Independent Filmmaker Project (IFP) selected the Dig Two Graves script as one of 20 in its Emerging Narrative Program. The IFP focuses exclusively on low-budget films (under $1 million) and provides first-time feature film directors with a free year-long mentorship that assists them and their crew with post-production, marketing, and distribution of their films. During filming the IFP chose Dig Two Graves to participate in its annual Independent Filmmaker Labs. Hunter Adams' team included producers P.J. Fishwick and Claire Connelly and film editor Scott Hanson.

=== Filming ===
Production took place over a total of five weeks: four weeks in January and one week in the summer. During filming, the cast endured one of Southern Illinois' worst winters in recorded history. However, producer P.J. Fishwick and associate producer Jon Parker, along with Adams, agreed that the area gave the film the visual look needed to maintain authenticity under a low-budget. Northern Illinois was the crew's first location choice, but location pictures provided by the Illinois Film Office convinced them that Southern Illinois and the area of "Little Egypt" provided the film's grim supernatural element.

== Release ==
The film has a 71% approval rating on Rotten Tomatoes based on 28 critic reviews. It has a score of 67 on Metacritic indicating, "generally favorable" reviews.

Doc Rotten for Horror News - "Dig Two Graves is exquisite and captivating, a haunting and darkly beautiful tale of grief, sorrow and regret [...] Adams paints a dark thriller that splendidly unfolds with each discovery and tragic turn. Ushering the film along is Ted Levine as the patriarch of the family and the leader of the quiet small town, his performance is nuanced and layered leaving the audience hanging on each gruff syllable. Dig Two Graves is bitter sweet, haunting and richly rewarding, a must see."

Ian Sedensky for Culture Crypt - "Coldly captivating, but burning beautifully with an authentic Midwestern feel, cinematography is cleverly plotted without being unnecessarily creative, 'Dig Two Graves' is thought through as a cinematic story, where the medium subtly enhances the telling in virtually every sequence...'Dig Two Graves' is a rare genre drama that strays from sentimentality to deliver a suspenseful story executed with powered precision."

Florita A. for Hell Horror - "The movie is captivating with its dark, eerie fantasy storyline of grief."

Joseph Perry for Gruesome Magazine - "Eric Maddison's cinematography is engaging and sometimes deceptively simple. He makes the quarry and surrounding woods feel almost like a character unto themselves, and he shows off striking underwater shots, as well. Scott D. Hanson certainly deserves mention for his skillful editing. The score by Brian Deming, Ryan Kattner, and Joseph Plummer subtly heightens the tension and perfectly sets different moods throughout."

=== Accolades ===
After premiering at the Midwest Independent Film Festival on March 3, 2015, Dig Two Graves has gone on to win "Best Feature" at the Beaufort International Film Festival (2015), the "Independent Spirit Award" at the Sedona International Film Festival (2015), and "Best Wisconsin Film" at the Beloit International Film Festival (2015).
