= Urban Explorer =

- Directed by: Andy Fetscher
- Written by: Martin Thau
- Produced by: Oliver Thau
- Starring: Nathalie Kelley; Nick Eversman; Klaus Stiglmeier; Max Riemelt; Brenda Koo; Catherine De Léan
- Cinematography: Andy Fetscher
- Edited by: Andy Fetscher
- Production companies: Papermoon Films; Rialto Film; The Little Film Company
- Distributed by: Universum (Germany)
- Release dates: 8 April 2011 (Belgium); 20 October 2011 (Germany)
- Running time: 88 minutes
- Country: Germany
- Language: English
- Budget: $3,000,000

Urban Explorer (also known as The Depraved) is a 2011 German horror film directed by Andy Fetscher and starring Nathalie Kelley, Nick Eversman, Klaus Stiglmeier, Max Riemelt, Brenda Koo and Catherine De Léan. The film is about urban exploration in subterranean Berlin.

== Plot ==
Four young urban explorers from the United States, South America, Asia, and Europe meet up in Berlin via the internet to explore the subterranean relics of Nazi Germany. The destination for the illegal tour, through a labyrinth of tunnels, sewers, and catacombs, is a special bunker, the Fahrerbunker (Hitler's subterranean garage) which is the center of many legends, where they expect to find the debris of forbidden Nazi wall murals. But when tragedy strikes the group's leader, they soon realize not all things go according to plan. Two Nazi men with their pet bulldog who harass them until they leave from the youth group.

Marie accidentally takes a picture of their local tour leader causing Kris (Riemelt) to fall off the wooden bridge, fall onto the ruined floor and break his leg. Marie feels guilty for what she has done to him. Marie (De Léan) and Juna (Koo) go for help and find their way back to the club. Lucia (Kelley) is a nurse so she and Denis (Eversman) stay to help Kris. Marie and Juna attempt to remember which way they came from. They both go into a dark hall without knowing what's happening to them both under Berlin. Sometimes later, Denis and Lucia are still waiting for Marie and Juna to come back, but a German-only speaking Armin shows up who Denis tries to understand with his limited German skills. Lucia writes the note for Marie and Juna. The three carry Kris to Armin's lair. He gives Kris an injection and uses a telephone to "call" for help. Lucia realizes that Armin has so many medical. Denis devours the soup for dinner. Both Denis and Lucia do not trust the unshaven dirty underground dwelling Armin. Denis goes to the hall where he talks to him, but he quickly turns around and injects Denis.

Denis wakes up from his own injection tied to a metal bed. He breaks free and uses the telephone to call for help, but he realizes the wire is cutting off. He finds it out that Armin who pretends to call for help. Denis hears her screaming when he goes to find Lucia trapped in a chair being tortured by Armin, and Denis watches, too cowardly to act. Denis discovers that Armin has been collecting all of his previous victims' stuffs on the locker room from the past throughout his history. Eventually, he manages to free Lucia but Armin knows the underground and keeps the horror coming. Lucia falls down a hole, and Denis must return to get the ropes. Before he leaves, they exchange "I love yous". Return to the locker room, he hears a sound come from the strange room where he goes into it and finds one of two earrings that come from Juna who wore it. Denis shocks to find it out a horrible Juna's severed head in the refrigerator. He freaked out when he spills the bucket of mysterious meat. Then, Denis finds it out with his horror sight of a Marie's naked corpse hooked up in an upside down where she has a knife in her right breast. Dennis discovers that Marie and Juna have been killed and butchered by Armin before they both went into the dark hall. He realizes that Armin tricked him for eating the meat as a soup which came from Juna's body. Denis vomits in a sickening manner. Armin shoots Denis in his right shoe causing him to become weak. He puts him on the table and takes his shirt off. Armin puts the crowd onto Denis' head when he takes his knife out of his pocket to gut him alive. Weakly, Denis falls off the table and onto the floor until Armin throws a salt onto him when he screams in pain.

Lucia digs through the dirty wall when she runs through the hallway. She walks on the rail while her eyes almost become blur because of the injection. Kris wakes up from his injection when he freaks it out at the innerds where he's in a trash room. She finds an elder man who offers her help but Armin kills him. She gets on the subway car but so does Armin who poses as a subway ticket checker. Her protests of help and accusations of murder go unheeded. Armin removes her from the car and then kills her by snapping her neck. Armin drags her corpse into a dark room next to the elder man's corpse. Kris crawls through the hallway to find Denis' gruesome corpse. Armin cleans up the bloody mess to keep it secret from anyone investigating. Kris crawls into the sewer where he escapes in the water. The next day, three children are playing the ball and finding Kris' body is possible dead or unconscious in an open sewer. In a dark underground of Berlin where Armin is toothbrushing his creepy teeth. It's implied that he's hiding of his private cannibalism personal. Armin will might having his next new victims.

== Cast ==
- Nathalie Kelley as Lucia
- Nick Eversman as Denis
- Klaus Stiglmeier as Armin
- Max Riemelt as Kris / Dante
- Brenda Koo as Juna
- Catherine De Léan as Marie
- Adolfo Assor as The Man At The Subway Station
- Johannes Klaußner as The Man In The Subway
- Andreas Wisniewski as The Neo-Nazi

== Release ==
Urban Explorer was first released on 24 July 2011 at the Fantasia Film Festival in Montreal.

== Reception ==
Urban Explorer received mixed to negative reviews from critics upon its release.

Justin Lowe of The Hollywood Reporter gave the film a negative review, writing, "Starting off with an intriguing concept and the unique underground Berlin setting, screenwriter Martin Thau and director Andy Fetscher rapidly squander their advantage with a prosaic visual style, weak characterizations and predictable plotting. Once mayhem ensues, there’s little remaining investment in the characters' survival." Melissa Voelker of HorrorNews.net stated in her review of the film that, while the film was well shot/edited, and featured an effectively creepy location, but concluded by stating, "it wasn’t enough to make Urban Explorers more than a slightly better than average torture p*rn flick. A few cringe worthy scenes doesn’t make up for a threadbare plot, a lack of likable or relatable characters, or some good old fashioned realism."

Robert Koehler of Variety gave the film a more positive review, praising Fetscher's work on the film, writing, "his one-man-band combination of direction, lensing and editing proves crucial, displaying a balance of craft and patience in building layers of suspense under a horrific setting that goes beyond any urban explorer’s worst nightmare." Gareth Jones of Dread Central awarded the film a score of 3/5, writing, "Ultimately effective, and indisputably horrific, it’s a shame that it just takes far too long to get where it’s going – meaning that for some the horrors to be explored here may just remain buried in the undiscovered reaches of the later runtime."
