= Tim Hopper =

American actor

- Occupation: Actor
- Years active: 1987–present

Tim Hopper is an American actor known for his appearances in movies, like Tenderness, To Die For, and School of Rock.

He has been an ensemble member of the Steppenwolf Theater Company in Chicago since 1988 and acted in various stage productions, including Arthur Miller's The Crucible.

He was nominated for the 2003 Joseph Jefferson Award in the category "Actor in a Supporting Role in a Play" for The Violet Hour and received an Obie Award for his performance in More Stately Mansions at the New York Theatre Workshop.

In 2012, Hopper appeared as Henry in the off-Broadway production of Him with Primary Stages.

== Filmography ==
=== Film ===
| Year | Title | Role |
|---|---|---|
| 1991 | Frankie & Johnny | Lester |
| 1991 | Class Action | Howie |
| 1991 | Das Gesetz der Macht | Howie |
| 1992 | The Last of the Mohicans | Ian |
| 1994 | Squanto: A Warrior's Tale | William Bradford |
| 1995 | To Die For | Mike Warden |
| 2001 | Vanilla Sky | Man in Blue Coat |
| 2002 | Pipe Dream | Mitch Farkas |
| 2002 | Personal Velocity: Three Portraits | Mr. Brown |
| 2003 | School of Rock | Zack's Father |
| 2007 | Gardener of Eden | Bill Huxley |
| 2007 | First Born | Officer White |
| 2009 | Tenderness | Dan Komenko |
| 2019 | Knives and Skin | Dan Kitzmiller |
| 2021 | Our Father | Henry |
| 2023 | Perpetrator | Gene Baptiste |

=== Television ===
| Year | Title | Role | Notes |
|---|---|---|---|
| 2020 | Utopia | Dale Warwick | 3 episodes |
| 2017–Present | Chicago Fire | Tom Van Meter | 36 episodes |
| 2013–2014 | The Americans | Sanford Prince | 4 episodes |
| 2011 | Inside | Narrator | 1 episode |
| 2011 | The American Experience | Voice of Adolphus Greely | 1 episode |
| 2009 | White Collar | Uncle Gary | 1 episode |
| 2007 | Grey's Anatomy | Dustin Klein | 1 episode |
| 2007 | Medium | Michael Levitt | 1 episode |
| 2006–2014 | Most Evil | Narrator | 38 episodes |
| 2006 | As the World Turns | Judge Steve Colby | 2 episodes |
| 2006 | The Mikes | Mike Stanley | TV movie |
| 2005 | Law & Order: Trial by Jury | M.E. George Gibson | 2 episodes |
| 2000–2006 | Law & Order: Special Victims Unit | Beau Miller / Gregory Hensal | 2 episodes |
| 2000 | Third Watch | Frank Matthews | 1 episode |
| 2000 | Perfect Murder, Perfect Town: JonBenét and the City of Boulder | Unknown | TV movie |
| 2000 | Future Man | Dr. Francis | 1 episode |
| 1997–1999 | Oz | Reporter Rick Donn | 10 episodes |
| 1996 | Almost Perfect | Tony Madden | 1 episode |
| 1995 | New York Undercover | Unknown | 1 episode |
| 1995 | Law & Order | Mr. Wiley | Episode: "Pride" |
| 1989 | Howard Beach: Making a Case for Murder | Unknown | TV movie |

=== Videogames ===
| Year | Title | Role |
|---|---|---|
| 2008 | Need for Speed: Undercover | Primary #2 |
| 2010 | Need for Speed: World | |
