= Andy Fetscher =

- Born: 1980 (age 45–46); Munich, Bavaria, West Germany
- Occupations: Film director, cinematographer, screenplay writer
- Years active: 2002 – present

Andy Fetscher (German pronunciation: [ˈfɛt͡ʃɐ]) is a German-Romanian film director, cinematographer and screenwriter.

== Life and work ==
Andy Fetscher was born in Munich, West Germany. He shot his first films as PR stunts for a satirical magazine, which he published with friends. After his graduation at the age of 19, he worked as a freelance photographer and journalist for a stock photo agency in Germany. From 2001 to 2007 he studied both Cinematography and Directing at the German Film Academy Baden-Württemberg in Ludwigsburg. Andy Fetscher graduated film school with his feature film Bukarest Fleisch, which was premiered at the Brussels International Fantastic Film Festival in 2007. His second film Urban Explorer, also a horror movie, was released in 2011. In most of his works, in addition to directing, he takes on multiple production roles including camerawork, editing, and sound design.

== Filmography ==
- 2007: Bukarest Fleisch (TV film)
- 2011: Urban Explorer
- 2014–2016: Binny and the Ghost (TV series, 7 episodes)
- 2015–2017: Leipzig Homicide (TV series, 4 episodes)
- 2017: Tatort: Fürchte dich (TV series episode)
- 2022: Old People

== Awards and nominations (selection) ==
- 2011: Won four Festival Trophies in the categories Best Picture, Best Actor, Best Editing and Best Make-up for Urban Explorer at the Los Angeles Screamfest Horror Film Festival
- 2011: Nomination for the award Silver Raven in the category Best director for Urban Explorer at the Brussels International Fantastic Film Festival
