= Mark Toland (entertainer) =

American magician

- Born: October 1, 1986 (age 39); Iola, Kansas, U.S.
- Occupation: magician/Entertainer/Mind Reader/Actor/ Illusionist
- Years active: 2009–present
- Spouse: Stephanie Toland (2011–present)
- Website: www.marktoland.com

Mark Charles Toland (October 1, 1986) is a professional magician and mentalist from Iola, Kansas who specializes in mind reading. His shows involve high audience participation, as he guesses birthdays, iPhone passwords, first crushes, and more.

== Background ==
Toland first began learning magic at age 3 when his mother gave him a book of magic tricks. Growing up, his primary influences were David Copperfield, Harry Houdini, and The Rat Pack. Toland attended University of Southern California from 2005 to 2006, and transferred to Wichita State University, graduating in 2009 with a Bachelor of Fine Arts in Music Theater. He is a member of The Magic Castle Junior Program, and International Brotherhood of Magicians.

While at USC, Mark performed a card trick in which he accurately guessed the card someone picked from the deck (the 6 of Hearts), and then he revealed said card by showing it on the ceiling of the USC Bookstore overhang which is approximately 30 feet high. The card is still there, albeit weathered, til this day.

On November 5, 2015, Toland gave a TEDx Talk at Parker School, where he talked about honest lies.

In July 2015, Toland unlocked reporter Ana Belaval's iPhone on WGN-TV.
