= M. B. M. Toland =

American writer, poet and leader in San Francisco society

Mary B. Toland
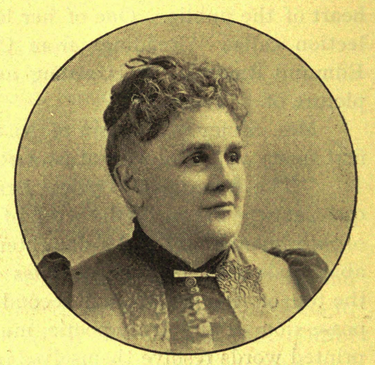
- Toland in an 1893 publication.
- Born: Mary Bertha McKenzie (or Morrison); 1825; West Dresden, Maine, U.S.
- Died: November 14, 1895 (aged 69–70); San Francisco, California, U.S.
- Resting place: Laurel Hill Cemetery
- Occupations: writer; philanthropist
- Spouses: Mr. Gridley; Hugh Toland (m. 1860; died 1880)
- Children: 2
- Writing career
- Pen name: M. B. M. Toland
- Genre: poetry
- Notable work: Legend Laymone

M. B. M. Toland (née McKenzie or Morrison; after first marriage, Gridley; after second marriage, Toland; 1825-1895) was an American writer and poet, as well as a leader in San Francisco society. A woman of considerable wealth, she was the mainstay of numerous charitable institutions. After the death of her husband, Hugh Toland, who founded Toland Medical College, she devoted considerable time to literary pursuits, becoming best known by her poem. She published many volumes of poetry, which were usually issued as holiday editions.

== Early life ==
Mary Bertha McKenzie (or Morrison) (Note: Some sources record her maiden name as McKenzie while others record Morrison.) was born in West Dresden, Maine, in 1825, but removed to California at an early age.

On her father's side, she was of Scottish Highlands ancestry, while on her mother's, of English descent. The home where Mary Bertha was born was formerly the residence of Colonel Richard Taylor of the American Revolutionary War era.

== Career ==
Toland was the author of several poems, most of them of a romantic and legendary character. The first one, entitled Stella, was published soon after her marriage, which took place at the residence of her cousin, J. W. White, the manager of the Ophir mine, in the company of whose wife she was visiting California. Though written as a rhythmic story for the amusement of her son, it passed through several editions.

While Toland was preparing to visit the Centennial Exhibition (Philadelphia, Pennsylvania, 1876), two young women visitors to her home noticed the first canto of an unfinished poem, and for their amusement, Toland promised to complete it. The result was Sir Rae, a highland story narrated with a delicate touch. Though published anonymously in 1876, the work was afterward acknowledged by its writer. Her signature since then, at her husband's request, was "M. B. M. Toland".

After being widowed a second time, Toland devoted herself to writing and to study. In Iris: The Romance of an Opal Ring, a portion of it was written on the banks of the Kennebec River, the scene is her early New England home. Onti Ora (the Native American phrase for the Catskill Mountains), was dedicated in 1881 to the memory of her husband who died the year before. The Inca Princess was inscribed to Bishop Kip, an intimate friend. Aegle and the Elf, which Toland termed a fantasy, was written in four hours in an original metre and published in 1887. In 1888 appeared Eudora, A Tale of Love, in five cantos with figure drawings by Siddons Mowbray, and landscapes by Hamilton Gibson. But perhaps of all her poems, and certainly of all her minor poems, the one which attracted the most attention was the Legend of Laymone, published at the beginning of 1890 and the scene of which was in Lower California. The metre is identical with that of Aegle and the Elf, and it was well adapted to the legendary character of the tale; among those whom it describes is Father Junípero Serra. A number of other books of verse, mostly in the form of metrical narrative, followed, including Tisáyac of the Yosemite, and Atlini. Toland invented some new metres, especially that used in Laymone.

Toland's poems did not lend themselves to quotation. She evaded moralizing, as her object was to entertain. All these poems were illustrated, the drawings in the Legend of Laymone being the productions of ten artists of the day. The works were published by the Lippincotts, some of them passing through several editions. The entire revenue derived from their sale was devoted to the relief of authors and artists facing economic hardship.

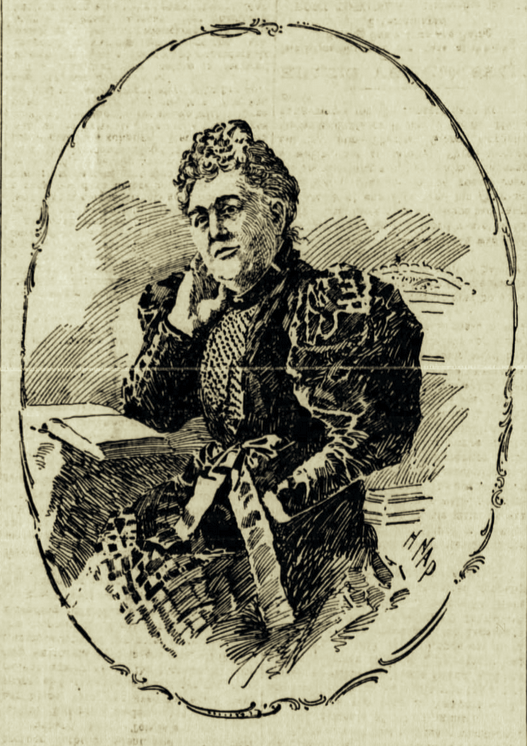
1895 drawing from a photo.

As an artist, Toland produced paintings and pen-pictures, having studied under masters, including Toby Edward Rosenthal, whose lessons she valued on account of his German style.

== Personal life ==
In Dresden, Maine, on January 14, 1847, she married Charles H. Gridley of Boston. They had a son, Charles Gridley (d. 1891). She was widowed at an early age. On October 6, 1860, she married Hugh Toland. They had a son, Hugo. Hugh Toland also adopted Charles. Between 1881 and 1885, she made a world tour in company with her son Hugo.

Toland lived for many years in the Occidental Hotel, in San Francisco, where she died on November 14 1895. Interment was at Laurel Hill Cemetery.

== Selected works ==
- Aegle and the elf, a fantasy
- Atlina, queen of the floating isle
- Eudora: a tale of love
- The Inca princess: an historical romance
- Iris the romance of an opal ring
- Legend Laymone, a poem
- Onti Ora. A metrical romance.
- Sir Rae. A poem
- Stella
- Tisáyac of the Yosemite

== Gallery ==
Aegle and the elf, a fantasy

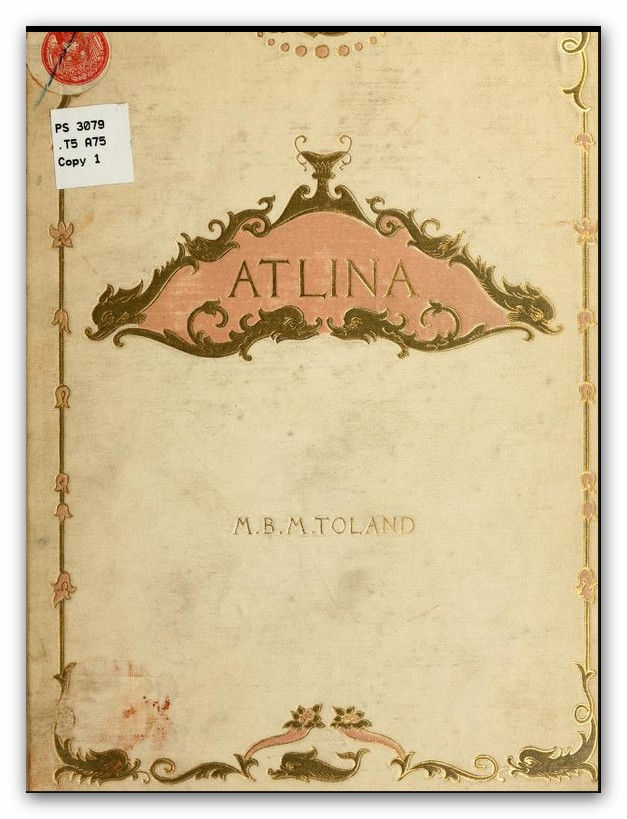
Atlina

Eudora, a tale of love

Legend Laymone, a poem

Sir Rae. A poem

Stella

Tisáyac of the Yosemite
