= Brook Toland =

American actress

- Born: Brook Catherine Toland; December 1, 1992 (age 33); Evanston, Illinois, U.S.
- Occupation: Actress
- Years active: 2009–present

Brook Toland is an American actress best known for her role on ABC Family's Becoming Us television show, which was produced by Ryan Seacrest. Prior to this, Toland co-starred in an independent film called Innocent in 2009 with Alexa Vega.

== Filmography ==
=== Film and television ===
Year	Title	Role	Notes
2009	Innocent	Punky	
2015	Becoming Us	Brook	Recurring role; 10 episodes
