= Hugh Toland =

American surgeon

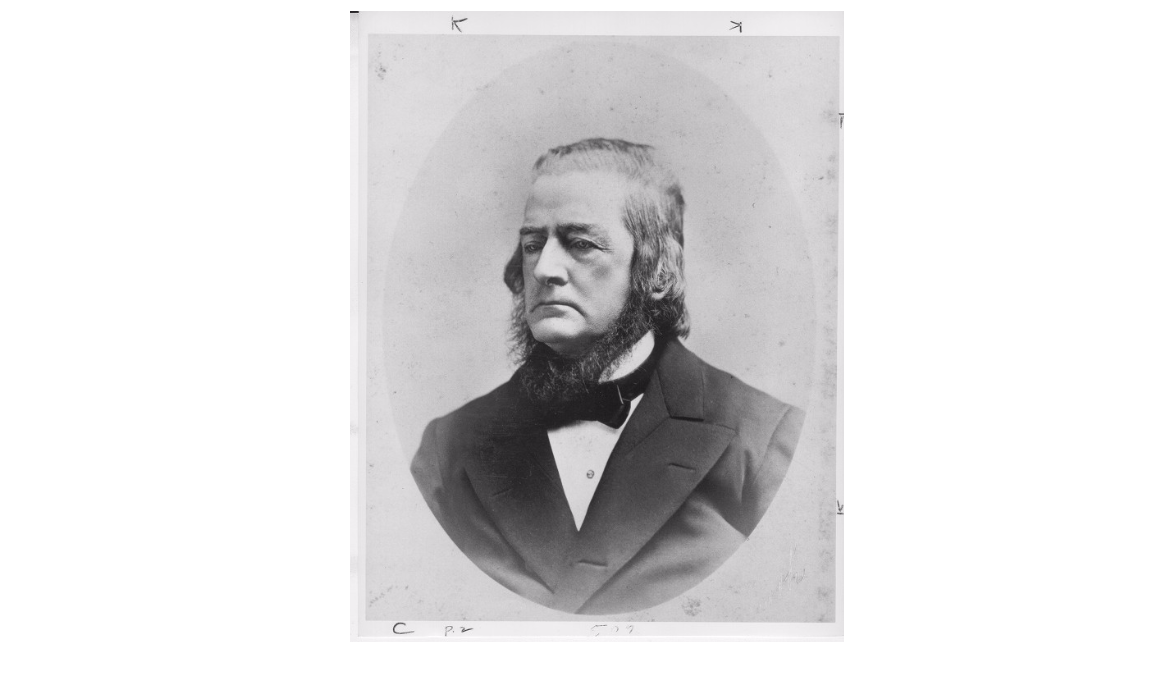
- Born: Hugh Huger Toland; April 16, 1806; Guilder's Creek, Newberry County, South Carolina, U.S.
- Died: February 27, 1880 (aged 73); San Francisco, California, U.S.
- Burial place: Cypress Lawn Memorial Park
- Education: Transylvania Medical College
- Occupations: Surgeon, academic
- Years active: 1832–1880
- Known for: Founder of the University of California, San Francisco
- Spouses: Mary Goodwin; Mary America Avery; Mary Bertha Morrison

Hugh Huger Toland (April 16, 1806 – February 27, 1880) was an American surgeon who founded the Toland Medical College, which later became the University of California, San Francisco (UCSF). He was one of the most successful surgeons in California. He was from South Carolina, and was active in San Francisco.

== Biography ==
Hugh Huger Toland was born on April 16, 1806, in Guilder's Creek, Newberry County, South Carolina. He was the fourth of ten children, his father was planter John Toland (1776–1849), and his mother was Mary Boyd (née Spence) Toland (1778–1858).

Toland received his medical degree in 1828 from Transylvania Medical College, in Lexington, Kentucky. After practicing medicine in Columbia, South Carolina, he arrived in San Francisco with his wife in 1851.

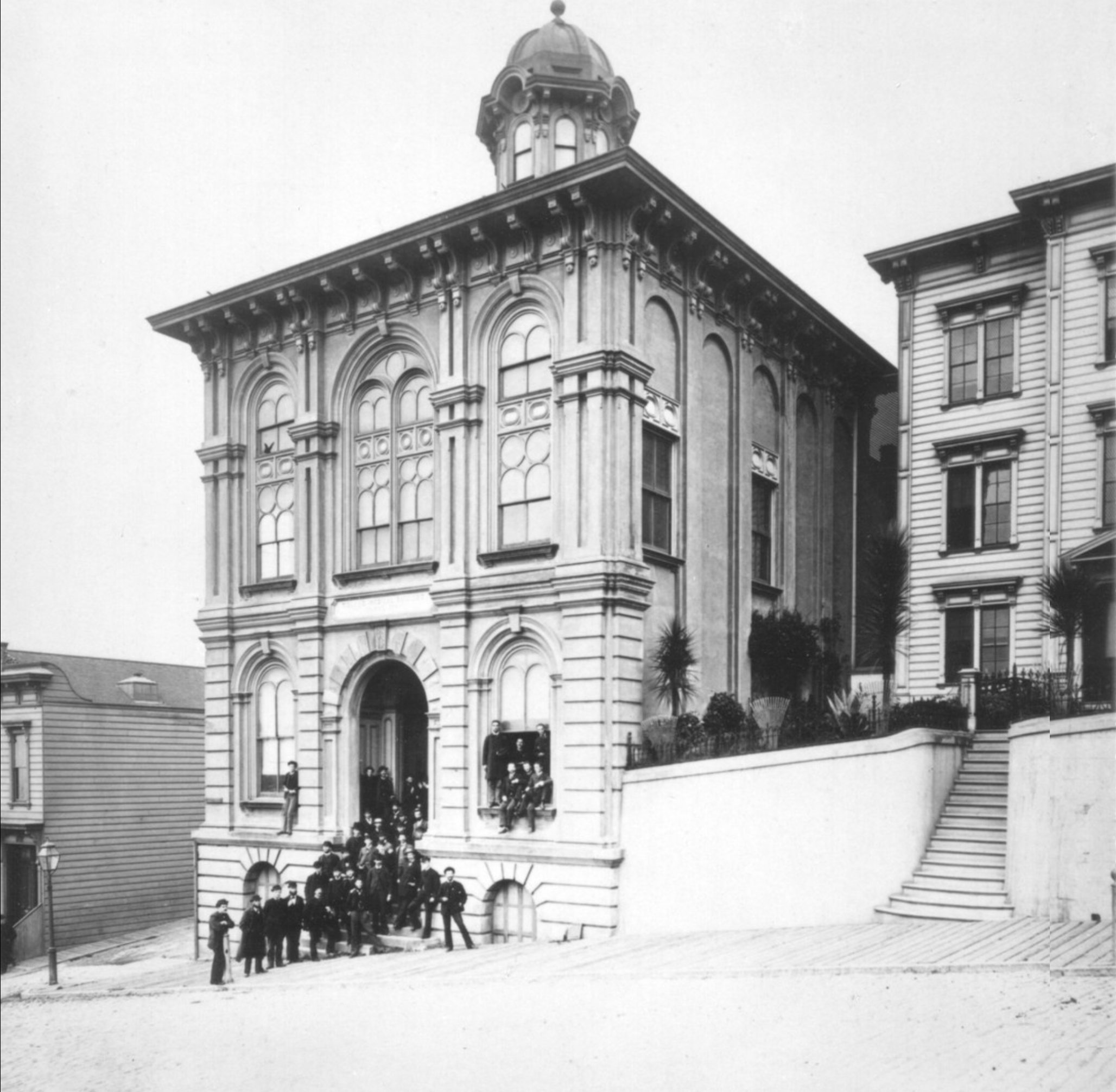
Toland Hall building (San Francisco, ca. 1873)

In 1864 he established Toland Medical College, building a headquarters at the corner of Stockton and Francisco, across from the San Francisco City and County Hospital. Most of the faculty and students transferred from the earlier Cooper Medical College, which had closed after the death of its founder, Elias Samuel Cooper. The first class graduated in 1865. By 1870, the school had a class of thirty students and forty-five alumni.

That year, Toland sought to affiliate the school to the recently created University of California. In March 1873, the school became the Medical Department of the University of California. Initially, he fought to keep his name in the institution, but he eventually gave in, feeling that a public institution should not bear the name of a private person.

== Death and legacy ==
He died of a stroke at age 74, in San Francisco. He was buried at Laurel Hill Cemetery, however his remains were moved to Cypress Lawn Memorial Park, Colma, California, by 1941.

The main lecture hall at UCSF bears his name. The same lecture hall features many murals, some depicting Hugh Toland himself. Brown and Toland Physicians, a Bay Area medical group, is named after Toland and Charlotte Blake Brown.
