= Nick Eversman =

American actor (born 1986)

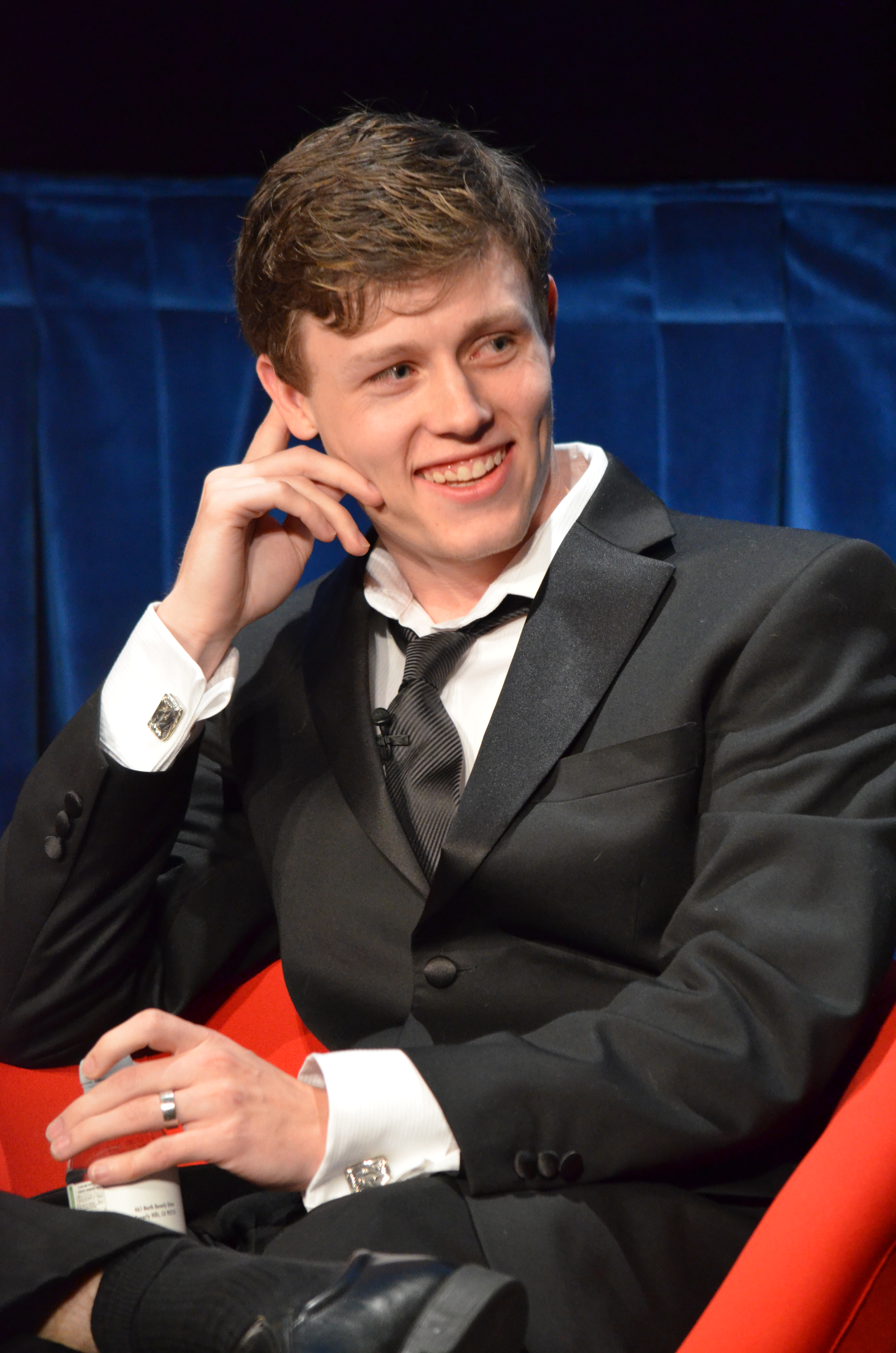
- Eversman in 2012.
- Born: February 15, 1986 (age 40); Madison, Wisconsin, U.S.
- Occupation: Actor
- Years active: 2009–present
- Spouse: Emily Nuguid (after 2008)
- Children: 2

Nicholas Eversman (born February 15, 1986) is an American actor, best known for his roles as Michael Winstone on the ABC mystery drama Missing and Liam Jones II on the ABC fantasy adventure drama Once Upon a Time.

== Filmography ==
=== Film ===
Year	Title	Role	Notes
2009	The Kari Files	Silverstein	
2009	Innocent	Shane	
2010	The Runaways	Ricky	
2010	Vampires Suck	Jeremiah	
2011	Hellraiser: Revelations	Steven Craven	
2011	Urban Explorer	Denis	
2012	Beverly Hills Chihuahua 3: Viva la Fiesta!	Phil	Voice
2012	Deep Dark Canyon	Skylar Towne	
2014	Get On Up	Mick Jagger	
2014	At the Devil's Door	Calvin	
2014	Pretty Boy	Sean Collins	
2014	Wild	Richie	
2015	The DUFF	Toby Tucker	
2015	Victor	Razor	
2016	Mother, May I Sleep with Danger?	Bob	
2017	Billy Boy	Greg Basualdo	
2018	Juveniles	Elliot	
2025	Dear Luke, Love, Me	Luke	

=== Television ===
Year	Title	Role	Notes
2009	A Marriage	Jake Gabriel	Television film
2010	Ghost Whisperer	Mike Walker	"Blessings in Disguise" (Season 5, episode 12)
2010	CSI: Miami	Todd Bradstone	"In the Wind" (Season 8, episode 14)
2010	House	Nick	"Black Hole" (Season 6, episode 15)
2011	NCIS	Judd Stern	"Defiance" (Season 8, episode 15)
2011	Cinema Verite	Grant Loud	Television film
2012	Missing	Michael Winstone	Main cast
2013–2014	The Tomorrow People	Kurt Rundle	Recurring role
2015	Agents of S.H.I.E.L.D.	Shane Larson	"Devils You Know" (Season 3, episode 4)
2016–2017	Once Upon a Time	Liam	"Dark Waters" (Season 6, episode 6), "A Wondrous Place" (Season 6, episode 15)
2017	Electric Dreams	Avishai	1 Episode (Autofac)
2017	When We Rise	Scott Rempel	Main role
2020	The Good Lord Bird	John Brown Jr.	Main Role (7 episodes)
