= Up in the Air (soundtrack) =

Up in the Air: Music from the Motion Picture

Soundtrack album by Various artists
- Released: November 9, 2009
- Label: Warner Music
- Producer: Rolfe Kent

Up in the Air: Music from the Motion Picture is the official soundtrack to the 2009 comedy drama Up in the Air. The album was released on November 9, 2009. The CD version consists of fourteen tracks, while a blue translucent vinyl version was released consisting of 12 tracks. The vinyl version does not contain the tracks "Bust a Move" or "Milwaukee: To the Wedding with a Plus 1". The score to Up in the Air was composed by Rolfe Kent, who recorded his score with a 55-piece ensemble of the Hollywood Studio Symphony at the Sony Scoring Stage. Tony Blondal orchestrated.

== Background ==
Jason Reitman, director of Up in the Air said in an interview that he views a film's soundtrack like a character in the film, saying "I start thinking about the music very early on. While I'm writing the script, I'm putting together a matching iTunes library. The result is a collection of songs that speaks to the nature of travel and warmth of human connection."

Both "Help Yourself" and "Up in the Air" were not eligible for consideration for the Academy Award for Best Original Song. Portions of Smith's song existed as part of previous songs he wrote and Renick wrote the song before he met Reitman.

== CD track listing ==
Up in the Air: Music from the Motion Picture
No.	Title	Length
1.	"This Land Is Your Land" (Sharon Jones & The Dap-Kings)	4:27
2.	"Security Ballet" (Rolfe Kent)	1:31
3.	"Goin' Home" (Dan Auerbach)	4:53
4.	"Taken at All" (Crosby, Stills, Nash & Young)	2:58
5.	"Angel in the Snow" (Elliott Smith)	2:35
6.	"Help Yourself" (Sad Brad Smith)	3:23
7.	"Genova" (Charles Atlas)	7:37
8.	"Lost in Detroit" (Rolfe Kent)	1:36
9.	"Thank You Lord" (Roy Buchanan)	2:24
10.	"Be Yourself" (Graham Nash)	2:59
11.	"The Snow Before Us" (Charles Atlas)	3:12
12.	"Up in the Air" (Kevin Renick)	5:29
13.	"Bust a Move" (Young MC)	4:23
14.	"Milwaukee: To the Wedding with a Plus 1" (Rolfe Kent)	1:54
Total length:		57:48

== Amazon exclusive track listing ==
Up in the Air: Music from the Motion Picture
No.	Title	Length
1.	"This Land Is Your Land" ([(Woody Guthrie Song)[Sharon Jones & The Dap-Kings]])	4:27
2.	"Security Ballet" (Rolfe Kent)	1:31
3.	"Goin' Home" (Dan Auerbach)	4:53
4.	"Taken at All" (Crosby, Stills, Nash & Young)	2:58
5.	"Angel in the Snow" (Elliott Smith)	2:35
6.	"Help Yourself" (Sad Brad Smith)	3:23
7.	"Genova" (Charles Atlas)	7:37
8.	"Lost in Detroit" (Rolfe Kent)	1:36
9.	"Thank You Lord" (Roy Buchanan)	2:24
10.	"Be Yourself (1971 demo)" (Graham Nash)	2:59
11.	"The Snow Before Us" (Charles Atlas)	3:12
12.	"Up in the Air" (Kevin Renick)	5:29
13.	"Time After Time" (Anna Kendrick)	3:42
Total length:		55:13

== Vinyl track listing ==
Side A

1. "This Land Is Your Land", Sharon Jones & The Dap-Kings, 4:27
2. "Security Ballet", Rolfe Kent, 1:31
3. "Goin' Home", Dan Auerbach, 4:53
4. "Taken at All", Crosby, Stills & Nash, 2:58
5. "Angel in the Snow", Elliott Smith, 2:35
6. "Help Yourself", Sad Brad Smith, 3:23

Side B

1. "Genova", Charles Atlas, 7:37
2. "Lost in Detroit", Rolfe Kent, 1:36
3. "Thank You Lord", Roy Buchanan, 2:24
4. "Be Yourself", Graham Nash, 2:59
5. "The Snow Before Us", Charles Atlas, 3:12
6. "Up in the Air", Kevin Renick, 5:29

== Musicians ==
Yukon Jake, a band from St. Louis, Missouri, where much of the filming of Up in the Air took place, was briefly featured in the film's wedding scene.

Reitman asked Chicago-based musician Sad Brad Smith to compose a song for the film after hearing him play in a Chicago coffee shop. Smith's song "Help Yourself" is featured during a pivotal wedding scene in the film. There was strong Oscar buzz for the song, but it was pulled from consideration by Paramount Pictures due to technicalities required by the Academy, which some deemed arbitrary. Smith was undiscovered up until that point and had not released any music prior to the film.

Kevin Renick wrote the song "Up in the Air" two years prior to knowing that Reitman was working on a film adaptation to the book. He was recently laid off at the time, and is an unrecorded, unemployed St. Louis musician. When Renick researched the film he discovered that the theme of the film was much the same as the song he had written. "The song is about uncertainty, disconnection and loneliness, while alluding to career transition," Renick explained. "It's a melancholy song, and a narrative about finding out where your life's going to go." He handed a cassette to Reitman after the director did a Q&A at Webster University. Renick included a spoken-word introduction about the song on the cassette so that Reitman would know why he was giving the song to him. Reitman found a tape deck, listened, liked the song and placed the original introduction and song from the cassette midway through the credits. Reitman stated that the song has a do-it-yourself authenticity.
