= Independent Spirit Award for Best Cinematography =

Film award given for achievement by independent film cinematographers

- Awarded for: Best Cinematography
- Country: United States
- Presented by: Film Independent
- First award: 1985
- Currently held by: Adolpho Veloso for Train Dreams (2025)
- Website: www.filmindependent.org

The Independent Spirit Award for Best Cinematography is one of the annual awards given out by Film Independent, a non-profit organization dedicated to independent film and independent filmmakers. It was first given in 1985, with Japanese cinematographer Toyomichi Kurita being the first recipient of the award for his work in Trouble in Mind.

== Winners and nominees ==
=== 1980s ===
Year	Film	Recipient(s)
1985	Trouble in Mind	Toyomichi Kurita
1985	After Hours	Michael Ballhaus
1985	Blood Simple	Barry Sonnenfeld
1985	Dim Sum: A Little Bit of Heart	Michael Chin
1986	Platoon	Robert Richardson
1986	Blue Velvet	Frederick Elmes
1986	Down by Law	Robby Müller
1986	Salvador	Robert Richardson
1986	True Stories	Edward Lachman
1987	Matewan	Haskell Wexler
1987	Barfly	Robby Müller
1987	The Dead	Fred Murphy
1987	Slam Dance	Amir Mokri
1987	Tough Guys Don't Dance	John Bailey
1988	The Unbearable Lightness of Being	Sven Nykvist
1988	The Moderns	Toyomichi Kurita
1988	Patti Rocks	Gregory M. Cummins
1988	Stand and Deliver	Tom Richmond
1988	Talk Radio	Robert Richardson
1989	Drugstore Cowboy	Robert Yeoman
1989	Earth Girls Are Easy	Oliver Stapleton
1989	Mystery Train	Robby Müller
1989	Powwow Highway	Toyomichi Kurita
1989	Talking to Strangers	Rob Tregenza

=== 1990s ===
Year	Film	Recipient(s)
1990	Wild at Heart	Frederick Elmes
1990	House Party	Peter Deming
1990	King of New York	Bojan Bazelli
1990	Life Is Cheap... But Toilet Paper Is Expensive	Amir Mokri
1990	The Plot Against Harry	Robert M. Young
1991	Kafka	Walt Lloyd
1991	Homicide	Roger Deakins
1991	My Own Private Idaho	Eric Alan Edwards and John J. Campbell
1991	Pastime	Tom Richmond
1991	Rambling Rose	Johnny E. Jensen
1992	Night on Earth	Frederick Elmes
1992	All the Vermeers in New York	Jon Jost
1992	Laws of Gravity	Jean de Segonzac
1992	Light Sleeper	Edward Lachman
1992	Swoon	Ellen Kuras
1993	Menace II Society	Lisa Rinzler
1993	American Heart	James R. Bagdonas
1993	Chain of Desire	Nancy Schreiber
1993	Equinox	Elliot Davis
1993	Ruby in Paradise	Alex Vlacos
1994	Barcelona	John Thomas
1994	The Beans of Egypt, Maine	Stevan Larner
1994	Eat Drink Man Woman	Jong Lin
1994	I Like It Like That	Alexander Gruszynski
1994	Suture	Greg Gardiner
1995	Leaving Las Vegas	Declan Quinn
1995	Little Odessa	Tom Richmond
1995	Nadja	Jim Denault
1995	The Underneath	Elliot Davis
1995	The Usual Suspects	Newton Thomas Sigel
1996	Fargo	Roger Deakins
1996	Bound	Bill Pope
1996	Color of a Brisk and Leaping Day	Rob Sweeney
1996	Dead Man	Robby Müller
1996	The Funeral	Ken Kelsch
1997	Kama Sutra: A Tale of Love	Declan Quinn
1997	The Bible and Gun Club	Alex Vendler
1997	Habit	Frank G. DeMarco
1997	Hard Eight	Robert Elswit
1997	Sunday	Michael Barrow and John Foster
1998	Velvet Goldmine	Maryse Alberti
1998	Affliction	Paul Sarossy
1998	Belly	Malik Hassan Sayeed
1998	High Art	Tami Reiker
1998	Pi	Matthew Libatique
1999	Three Seasons	Lisa Rinzler
1999	The City	Harlan Bosmajian
1999	Judy Berlin	Jeffrey Seckendorf
1999	Julien Donkey-Boy	Anthony Dod Mantle
1999	Twin Falls Idaho	M. David Mullen

=== 2000s ===
Year	Film	Recipient(s)
2000	Requiem for a Dream	Matthew Libatique
2000	Before Night Falls	Xavier Pérez Grobet and Guillermo Rosas
2000	George Washington	Tim Orr
2000	Hamlet	John de Borman
2000	Shadow of the Vampire	Lou Bogue
2001	Mulholland Drive	Peter Deming
2001	The American Astronaut	W. Mott Hupfel III
2001	The Deep End	Giles Nuttgens
2001	Hedwig and the Angry Inch	Frank G. DeMarco
2001	Memento	Wally Pfister
2002	Far from Heaven	Edward Lachman
2002	Gerry	Harris Savides
2002	Interview with the Assassin	Richard Rutkowski
2002	Narc	Alex Nepomniaschy
2002	Personal Velocity: Three Portraits	Ellen Kuras
2003	In America	Declan Quinn
2003	Elephant	Harris Savides
2003	Northfork	M. David Mullen
2003	Shattered Glass	Mandy Walker
2003	Streets of Legend	Derek Cianfrance
2004	The Motorcycle Diaries	Éric Gautier
2004	Dandelion	Tim Orr
2004	Redemption: The Stan Tookie Williams Story	David Greene
2004	Saints and Soldiers	Ryan Little
2004	We Don't Live Here Anymore	Maryse Alberti
2005	Good Night, and Good Luck	Robert Elswit
2005	Capote	Adam Kimmel
2005	Keane	John Foster
2005	Last Days	Harris Savides
2005	The Three Burials of Melquiades Estrada	Chris Menges
2006	Pan's Labyrinth	Guillermo Navarro
2006	Brothers of the Head	Anthony Dod Mantle
2006	Four Eyed Monsters	Arin Crumley
2006	Man Push Cart	Michael Simmonds
2006	Wild Tigers I Have Known	Aaron Platt
2007	The Diving Bell and the Butterfly	Janusz Kamiński
2007	Lust, Caution	Rodrigo Prieto
2007	The Savages	W. Mott Hupfel III
2007	Vanaja	Milton Kam
2007	Youth Without Youth	Mihai Mălaimare Jr.
2008	The Wrestler	Maryse Alberti
2008	Ballast	Lol Crawley
2008	Chop Shop	Michael Simmonds
2008	Medicine for Melancholy	James Laxton
2008	Milk	Harris Savides
2009	A Serious Man	Roger Deakins
2009	Bad Lieutenant: Port of Call New Orleans	Peter Zeitlinger
2009	Cold Souls	Andrij Parekh
2009	Sin nombre	Adriano Goldman
2009	Treeless Mountain	Anne Misawa

=== 2010s ===
Year	Film	Recipient(s)
2010	Black Swan	Matthew Libatique
2010	Never Let Me Go	Adam Kimmel
2010	Tiny Furniture	Jody Lee Lipes
2010	Winter's Bone	Michael McDonough
2010	Greenberg	Harris Savides
2011	The Artist	Guillaume Schiffman
2011	Bellflower	Joel Hodge
2011	The Off Hours	Benjamin Kasulke
2011	Midnight in Paris	Darius Khondji
2011	The Dynamiter	Jeffrey Waldron
2012	Beasts of the Southern Wild	Ben Richardson
2012	Valley of Saints	Yoni Brook
2012	Here	Lol Crawley
2012	End of Watch	Roman Vasyanov
2012	Moonrise Kingdom	Robert Yeoman
2013	12 Years a Slave	Sean Bobbitt
2013	Spring Breakers	Benoît Debie
2013	Inside Llewyn Davis	Bruno Delbonnel
2013	All Is Lost	Frank G. DeMarco
2013	Computer Chess	Matthias Grunsky
2014	Birdman or (The Unexpected Virtue of Ignorance)	Emmanuel Lubezki
2014	The Immigrant	Darius Khondji
2014	It Felt Like Love	Sean Porter
2014	A Girl Walks Home Alone at Night	Lyle Vincent
2014	Selma	Bradford Young
2015	Carol	Edward Lachman
2015	Beasts of No Nation	Cary Joji Fukunaga
2015	It Follows	Mike Gioulakis
2015	Meadowland	Reed Morano
2015	Songs My Brothers Taught Me	Joshua James Richards
2016	Moonlight	James Laxton
2016	Free in Deed	Ava Berkofsky
2016	The Childhood of a Leader	Lol Crawley
2016	The Eyes of My Mother	Zach Kuperstein
2016	American Honey	Robbie Ryan
2017	Call Me by Your Name	Sayombhu Mukdeeprom
2017	The Killing of a Sacred Deer	Thimios Bakatakis
2017	Columbus	Elisha Christian
2017	Beach Rats	Hélène Louvart
2017	The Rider	Joshua James Richards
2018	Suspiria	Sayombhu Mukdeeprom
2018	Madeline's Madeline	Ashley Connor
2018	Mandy	Benjamin Loeb
2018	We the Animals	Zak Mulligan
2018	Wildlife	Diego Garcia
2019	The Lighthouse	Jarin Blaschke
2019	Hustlers	Todd Banhazl
2019	Honey Boy	Natasha Braier
2019	The Third Wife	Chananun Chotrungroj
2019	Midsommar	Pawel Pogorzelski

=== 2020s ===
Year	Film	Recipient(s)
2020	Nomadland	Joshua James Richards
2020	She Dies Tomorrow	Jay Keitel
2020	Bull	Shabier Kirchner
2020	The Assistant	Michael Latham
2020	Never Rarely Sometimes Always	Hélène Louvart
2021	Passing	Eduard Grau
2021	Blue Bayou	Ante Cheng and Matthew Chuang
2021	The Humans	Lol Crawley
2021	A Chiara	Tim Curtin
2021	Zola	Ari Wegner
2022	Tár	Florian Hoffmeister
2022	Murina	Hélène Louvart
2022	Aftersun	Gregory Oke
2022	Pearl	Eliot Rockett
2022	Neptune Frost	Anisia Uzeyman
2023	The Holdovers	Eigil Bryld
2023	All Dirt Roads Taste of Salt	Jomo Fray
2023	Chronicles of a Wandering Saint	Pablo Lozano
2023	Monica	Katelin Arizmendi
2023	We Grown Now	Pat Scola
2024	Nickel Boys	Jomo Fray
2024	The Fire Inside	Rina Yang
2024	Inside the Yellow Cocoon Shell	Ðinh Duy Hưng
2024	Janet Planet	Maria von Hausswolff
2024	La cocina	Juan Pablo Ramírez
2025	Train Dreams	Adolpho Veloso
2025	Blue Sun Palace	Norm Li
2025	Dust Bunny	Nicole Hirsch Whitaker
2025	Peter Hujar's Day	Alex Ashe
2025	Warfare	David J. Thompson

== See also ==
- BAFTA Award for Best Cinematography
- Academy Award for Best Cinematography
- Critics' Choice Movie Award for Best Cinematography
- American Society of Cinematographers Award for Outstanding Achievement in Cinematography in Theatrical Releases
