= Elliot Davis (cinematographer) =

American cinematographer and architect

- Born: May 23, 1948 (age 78); USA
- Occupation: Cinematographer
- Years active: 1976–present

Elliot Davis (born May 23, 1948) is an American cinematographer.

Davis graduated from Virginia Tech with a Bachelor of Arts in Architecture and a Master of Fine Arts in Film from UCLA. Davis feels his tenure as an architect carries over into his shooting style.

Davis began his career in the mid 1970s, acting as cinematographer on the drama Harvest: 3,000 Years. He also would act as the camera operator for various films, including Francis Ford Coppola's The Outsiders and Joel Schumacher's St. Elmo's Fire. Davis would collaborate frequently with several directors, including Steven Soderbergh (King of the Hill, The Underneath, Gray's Anatomy, Out of Sight), Catherine Hardwicke (Thirteen, Lords of Dogtown, The Nativity Story, Twilight), and Jessie Nelson (I Am Sam, Love the Coopers).

Davis was the director of photography for Nate Parker's controversial directorial debut The Birth of a Nation. Davis was not familiar with Parker prior to receiving the script, but soon forged a creative connection with him, using films such as The Assassination of Jesse James by the Coward Robert Ford as influence for the look of Nation.

Additional works include The Cutting Edge, Father of the Bride Part II, Equinox, Larger than Life, Forces of Nature, 40 Days and 40 Nights, White Oleander, Legally Blonde 2: Red, White & Blonde, A Love Song for Bobby Long, The Iron Lady, Man of Tai Chi and Above Suspicion.

For his work on Equinox and The Underneath, Davis received two nominations for the Independent Spirit Award for Best Cinematography.

== Filmography ==
Film

Year	Title	Director	Notes
1976	Harvest: 3,000 Years	Haile Gerima	
1976	Independence Day	Bobby Roth	
1979	The Onion Field	Harold Becker	Camera operator
1980	Used Cars	Robert Zemeckis	Camera operator (uncredited)
1981	Broken English	Michie Gleason	
1982	Death Valley	Dick Richards	Camera operator
1983	The Outsiders	Francis Ford Coppola	Camera operator
1983	Something Wicked This Way Comes	Jack Clayton	Camera operator
1983	Return Engagement	Alan Rudolph	Documentary, Camera operator
1984	Racing with the Moon	Richard Benjamin	Camera operator: additional phot. (uncredited)
1985	Tuff Turf	Fritz Kiersch	Camera operator
1985	St. Elmo's Fire	Joel Schumacher	Camera operator
1985	Trouble in Mind	Alan Rudolph	Camera operator
1986	8 Million Ways to Die	Hal Ashby	Camera operator
1986	Blue City	Michelle Manning	Camera operator: second unit
1986	Vamp	Richard Wenk	
1987	Summer Heat	Michie Gleason	
1988	Miles from Home	Gary Sinise	
1988	1969	Ernest Thompson	Co-additional photography
1989	Signs of Life	John David Coles	
1989	Bloodhounds of Broadway	Howard Brookner	
1990	Bright Angel	Michael Fields	
1990	Love at Large	Alan Rudolph	
1991	Shakes the Clown	Bobcat Goldthwait	
1991	Mortal Thoughts	Alan Rudolph	
1992	The Cutting Edge	Paul Michael Glaser	
1992	Equinox	Alan Rudolph	Nominated - Independent Spirit Award for Best Cinematography
1993	King of the Hill	Steven Soderbergh	
1993	Mother's Boys	Yves Simoneau	
1994	Mr. Write	Charlie Loventhal	
1994	The Glass Shield	Charles Burnett	
1995	Things to Do in Denver When You're Dead	Gary Fleder	
1995	Father of the Bride Part II	Charles Shyer	With William A. Fraker
1995	The Underneath	Steven Soderbergh	Nominated - Independent Spirit Award for Best Cinematography
1996	Gray's Anatomy	Steven Soderbergh	
1996	Get on the Bus	Spike Lee	
1996	Larger than Life	Howard Franklin	
1997	Lawn Dogs	John Duigan	
1998	Out of Sight	Steven Soderbergh	
1998	Finding Graceland	David Winkler	
1999	Forces of Nature	Bronwen Hughes	
1999	Light It Up	Craig Bolotin	
1999	Breakfast of Champions	Alan Rudolph	
2000	The Next Best Thing	John Schlesinger	
2001	I Am Sam	Jessie Nelson	
2001	Happy Campers	Daniel Waters	
2002	40 Days and 40 Nights	Michael Lehmann	
2002	White Oleander	Peter Kosminsky	
2003	Thirteen	Catherine Hardwicke	
2003	Legally Blonde 2: Red, White & Blonde	Charles Herman-Wurmfeld	
2004	A Love Song for Bobby Long	Shainee Gabel	
2005	Lords of Dogtown	Catherine Hardwicke	
2006	The Nativity Story	Catherine Hardwicke	
2008	Surfer, Dude	S.R. Bindler	
2008	Twilight	Catherine Hardwicke	
2008	Personal Effects	David Hollander	
2011	The Iron Lady	Phyllida Lloyd	
2011	A Year in Mooring	Chris Eyre	SXSW Film Festival - Best Cinematography - Narrative Competition
2013	Man of Tai Chi	Keanu Reeves	
2013	Louder Than Words	Anthony Fabian	
2015	The Runner	Austin Stark	
2015	Love the Coopers	Jessie Nelson	
2015	Miss You Already	Catherine Hardwicke	
2016	The Birth of a Nation	Nate Parker	
2018	A Love of Money	Elliot Davis	
2018	Dumplin'	Anne Fletcher	
2018	Surfing in Afghanistan	R.T. Herwig	
2019	Above Suspicion	Phillip Noyce	
2020	Uncorked	Prentice Penny	
2022	Gigi & Nate	Nick Hamm	
2022	Hocus Pocus 2	Anne Fletcher	
2026	Street Smart	Catherine Hardwicke	

TV movies

Year	Title	Director
1979	The Tenth Month	Joan Tewkesbury
1997	Mayflower Madam	Lou Antonio
1992	Memphis	Yves Simoneau
1996	Nightjohn	Charles Burnett
