= List of Island Pictures films =

Island Pictures was a Los Angeles-based film company founded by producer Chris Blackwell. It was acquired by PolyGram Filmed Entertainment in July 1989 for $270 million. By 1994, it had produced 120 films, including the Oscar-winning Kiss of the Spider Woman (1985) and Spike Lee's She's Gotta Have It. PolyGram closed Island Pictures in 1997 following Blackwell's resignation.

This is a list of films produced, co-produced, or distributed by Island Pictures.

== 1980s ==
Release date	Title	Notes	Ref.
November 6, 1985	Subway	US distribution only; produced by Gaumont and TF1; owned by Sony Pictures Classics	
January 24, 1986	The Trip to Bountiful	US distribution only; owned by Shout! Studios via Westchester Films	
June 13, 1986	Mona Lisa	US distribution only; produced by HandMade Films	
August 8, 1986	She's Gotta Have It	distribution only; produced by 40 Acres and a Mule Filmworks; owned by Netflix; Inducted into the National Film Registry in 2019	
September 20, 1986	Down by Law	US distribution only; owned by Black Snake, Inc., with distribution rights licensed to Janus Films and the Criterion Collection	
November 7, 1986	Nobody's Fool		
February 20, 1987	Square Dance	produced in association with NBC Productions and Pacific Arts Corporation	
April 17, 1987	Heaven	US distribution only; owned by Lightyear Entertainment	
May 8, 1987	River's Edge	US theatrical distribution only; produced by Hemdale Film Corporation	
June 26, 1987	Straight to Hell	US distribution only; owned by Kino Lorber	
October 2, 1987	Slam Dance	distribution only	
November 6, 1987	Dark Eyes	US distribution only	
December 23, 1987	The Lonely Passion of Judith Hearne	US distribution only; produced by HandMade Films	
February 26, 1988	A Night in the Life of Jimmy Reardon	distributed by 20th Century Fox; owned by Universal Pictures	
April 1, 1988	Bellman and True	US distribution only; produced by HandMade Films and Thames Television	
April 22, 1988	Bagdad Cafe	US distribution only; owned by Leora Films Inc., with distribution rights currently licensed to Shout! Studios	
July 12, 1988	Track 29	US distribution only; produced by HandMade Films	
March 31, 1989	Crusoe		
October 13, 1989	From Hollywood to Deadwood		
November 3, 1989	Sidewalk Stories	owned by Carlotta Films	
November 3, 1989	Sweet Lies	distributed by CBS/Fox Video	

== 1990s ==
Release date	Title	Notes	Ref.
February 7, 1992	The Lunatic	distributed by Triton Pictures	
May 28, 1992	Time Will Tell	distributed by IRS Media	
April 21, 1995	The Basketball Diaries	distributed by New Line Cinema; co-owned by Palm Pictures and MGM	
January 12, 1996	Don't Be a Menace to South Central While Drinking Your Juice in the Hood	distributed by Miramax Films	
March 26, 1996	The Little Death	distributed by PolyGram Video	
May 31, 1996	Eddie	produced in association with Hollywood Pictures	
March 21, 1997	Mandela	co-owned by MGM and Palm Pictures	
March 28, 1997	B.A.P.S.	distributed by New Line Cinema	
August 6, 1997	Def Jam's How to Be a Player	distributed by Gramercy Pictures	
January 23, 1998	The Gingerbread Man	distributed by PolyGram Films	
April 28, 1998	Body Count	distributed by PolyGram Video	

== Island Alive Films ==
Release date	Title	Notes	Ref.
March 1982	Forty Deuce		
July 1982	Countryman	co-owned by Palm Pictures and MGM	
June 14, 1983	Koyaanisqatsi	US co-distribution with New Cinema only; produced by Zoetrope Studios	
November 23, 1983	Return Engagement	US co-distribution with New Cinema only	
January 27, 1984	El Norte	co-distribution with Cinecom only; owned by Independent Productions, with distribution rights licensed to Lionsgate, Janus Films and the Criterion Collection; Inducted into the National Film Registry in 1995	
February 10, 1984	Android	US co-distribution with New Cinema only	
August 29, 1984	Choose Me		
October 18, 1984	Stop Making Sense	US co-distribution with Cinecom only; owned by A24	
November 30, 1984	Ski Country	produced by Warren Miller Entertainment	
January 11, 1985	The Inheritors	US distribution only; owned by Mondo Macabro	
March 1, 1985	A Private Function	US distribution only; produced by HandMade Films	
March 8, 1985	The Hit	US distribution only; produced by Zenith Productions; owned by HanWay Films, with distribution rights licensed to Janus Films and the Criterion Collection	
March 29, 1985	The Lift	US distribution only; produced by Sigma Film Productions; owned by Blue Underground	
July 26, 1985	Kiss of the Spider Woman	US distribution only; owned by the film's producers	
August 2, 1985	Insignificance	US distribution only; produced by Zenith Productions; owned by HanWay Films, with distribution rights licensed to Janus Films and the Criterion Collection	
August 28, 1985	Bullshot	US distribution only; produced by HandMade Films	
October 18, 1985	A Sense of Freedom	US distribution only; produced by HandMade Films and Scottish Television	
December 11, 1985	Trouble in Mind	studio credit only; distributed by Alive Films; owned by Shout! Studios	

== See also ==
- Island Records
