= Roadie (1980 film) =

American musical comedy film

- Original movie poster
- Directed by: Alan Rudolph
- Screenplay by: Big Boy Medlin; Michael Ventura
- Story by: Big Boy Medlin; Michael Ventura; Zalman King; Alan Rudolph
- Produced by: Carolyn Pfeiffer; Zalman King (executive producer); John E. Pommer (associate producer)
- Starring: Meat Loaf; Kaki Hunter; Art Carney; Alice Cooper; Blondie; Roy Orbison; Hank Williams Jr.
- Cinematography: David Myers
- Edited by: Tom Walls
- Production companies: Alive Enterprises; Vivant Productions
- Distributed by: United Artists
- Release date: June 13, 1980
- Running time: 105 minutes
- Country: United States
- Language: English
- Budget: $4.7 million or $5 million
- Box office: $4,226,370

Roadie is a 1980 American musical comedy film directed by Alan Rudolph about a truck driver who becomes a roadie for a traveling rock and roll show. The film stars Meat Loaf and marks his first starring role in a film. There are also cameo appearances by musicians such as Roy Orbison and Hank Williams Jr. and supporting roles played by Alice Cooper and the members of Blondie.

== Plot ==
Travis W. Redfish is a beer-drinking, bar-brawling, fun-loving Texan who works as a distributor of Shiner beer. He also helps his father, Corpus C. Redfish, with the family salvage company, whose motto is "Everything will work if you let it!" B.B. Muldoon is his best friend and business partner and the romantic interest of Travis' younger sister Alice Poo.

While B.B. and Travis are making deliveries in their Shiner beer truck, they notice an RV broken down on the side of the road. At first, they laugh at the thought of helping the stranded motorists, but then Travis sees wannabee groupie Lola Bouillabaisse smile at him through the rear window of the RV. Travis slams on the brakes and decides to help, hoping to get a closer look at Lola. Lola is a huge fan of Alice Cooper, and Travis has never heard of "her". Road manager Ace wants Travis to drive them to Austin for a show played by Hank Williams Jr., produced by music mogul Mohammed Johnson. After repairing the RV, Travis lets Lola talk him into driving to Austin, where his ability to set up equipment in record time impresses Johnson, who demands that he work additional shows.

Despite his loathing for Travis, Ace forces Lola to persuade the unwilling Travis to continue working as their roadie so that Ace can get the credit for his work. Lola takes advantage of Travis' dazed state after a bar fight to get him to drive the group to the airport (eluding a police pursuit on the way) for a flight to Hollywood. Travis is angry and homesick when he wakes up and finds himself in Hollywood, but relents when Lola cries. He saves one show by physically threatening the band into playing and, when a Blondie concert is nearly canceled due to authorities' refusal to provide power, builds a DIY electrical generator that runs on cow dung, gaining him national publicity as the "greatest roadie that ever lived" due to his unusual techniques for fixing equipment. Along the way, he clumsily tries to seduce Lola, with whom he has fallen in love. Still, she rejects his overtures, explaining that she is only 16 and a virgin and is saving her "first time" for Alice Cooper, although she continues to flirt with other musicians whenever she has a chance. But Lola reveals her true feelings for Travis by getting jealous when he spends an evening with Debbie Harry.

Lola and Travis argue, causing him to take her immediately to Alice Cooper's show in New York City, where he plans to leave her so she can fulfill her groupie dreams while Travis goes home to Texas. However, Alice has heard of Travis' reputation and convinces him to stay long enough to fix the problems with Alice's sound system. In return for Travis' services, Alice buys him a bus to drive himself back to Texas and gives Lola VIP treatment, with a front-row seat, backstage access, and the promise of a romantic evening. Travis finds out that B.B. and Alice Poo are getting married and is determined to return to Texas for their wedding. Despite Lola's pleading that he stay, Travis leaves her in New York, telling her to pursue her dream as she probably won't get another chance with Alice Cooper.

Travis gets home just in time to see his best friend and sister exchange vows. He then gets a phone call from Lola, who has given up being a groupie, traveled to Texas to be with him, and is waiting at a nearby bus stop. Lola now plans to be a psychic instead. As Travis and Lola start to consummate their relationship in the parked bus, they are interrupted by a UFO suddenly landing in front of them. Lola uses her psychic power to sense that the aliens' spacecraft is broken, and they want Travis to fix it.

== Cast ==
The film featured numerous cameos by the musicians in real bands (Asleep at the Wheel, Blondie, and Utopia) as members of Alice Cooper's 'band', politicians (such as then Mayor of Austin Carole McClellan), non-acting show business personalities (such as television composer Jesse Frederick, music producer Joe Gannon and film editor Eric Gardner) and others, some playing a role and others playing themselves.

- Meat Loaf – Travis W. Redfish
- Kaki Hunter – Lola Bouilliabase
- Art Carney – Corpus C. Redfish
- Gailard Sartain – B.B. Muldoon
- Don Cornelius – Mohammed Johnson
- Rhonda Bates – Alice Poo
- Joe Spano – Ace
- Richard Marion – George
- Sonny Carl Davis – Bird (as Sonny Davis)
- Ginger Varney – Weather Girl
- Al Mays – Mohammed's Bodyguard
- Cindy Wills – Prom Queen
- Allan Graf – Tiny
- Merle Kilgore – Himself
- Jack Elliott – Himself (as Ramblin' Jack Elliott)
- Roy Orbison – Himself
- Hank Williams Jr. and The Bama Band
  - Hank Williams Jr.
  - Kerry Craig
  - Joe Hamilton
  - Warren Keith
  - Charles Smith
  - Dale Stratton
- Alice Cooper and the Alice Cooper Band
  - Alice Cooper
  - Sheryl Cooper
  - Fred Mandel
  - Davey Johnstone
  - Roger Powell
  - Kasim Sulton
  - John Wilcox
- Alvin Crow and The Pleasant Valley Boys
  - Alvin Crow
  - D.K. Little
  - Pete Finney
  - Tiny McFarland
  - Roger Crabtree
- Rick Crow and Asleep at the Wheel
  - Rick Crow
  - Chris O'Connell
  - Bobby Black
  - Pat Ryan
  - Daniel Levin
  - John Nicholas
  - Francis Christina
  - Dean DeMerritt
- Blondie
  - Deborah Harry
  - Chris Stein
  - Clem Burke
  - Jimmy Destri
  - Nigel Harrison
  - Frank Infante
- Larry Lindsey – Jerry
- Marcy Hanson – Groupie
- Carole McClellan – Sheriff
- Ray Benson – Himself
- Joe Gannon – Spittle Manager
- Jesse Frederick – Alice Cooper Roadie
- Eric Gardner – Concert Promoter

== Production ==
In the 1970s Texan author James "Big Boy" Medlin regularly wrote pieces in LA Weekly about a mechanic called Travis Redfish who was Medlin's fictional alter ago. Medlin and fellow writer Michael Ventura were hired by producer Zalman King to write a script based on the last day of John Wesley Hardin. It was never made but Medlin then suggested a film based on Travis Redish and King was enthusiastic. This became Roadie.

The film was produced by Carolyn Pfeiffer who was a partner in a music management company with Shep Gordon. The company wanted to move into films and to make a movie of Roadie. Alan Rudolph, who had written a television special for the company, was hired as director. Finance was raised from United Artists.

Meatloaf was suggested for the lead role of Travis by Shep Gordon. Rudolph recalled, "Meat was fine, a high-energy sense of humour but where the energy came from I never asked. I didn’t know his music at all and I still don’t. He was the character of Travis to me, albeit less Zen."

Michael Ventura later wrote "The thing about the Roadie script that Alan Rudolph never understood was simply this: Cartoonish as it was, it was about us and people we loved."

== Reception ==
Roger Ebert gave the film one and a half stars out of four, writing, "The tour is an invaluable plot device, since it explains a cross-country odyssey during which our heroes meet all sorts of famous singing stars, including Hank Williams Jr., Roy Orbison, Alice Cooper, Asleep at the Wheel, and Deborah Harry with Blondie. If the movie had given us more of their songs, this could have qualified as a concert movie. If it had given us more of Meat Loaf, it might have developed into a character study. But Roadie never makes up its mind. The movie's so genial, disorganized and episodic that we never really care about the characters, and yet whenever someone starts to sing the performance is interrupted for more meaningless plot development."

Giving the film 1 out of 5, TV Guide wrote, "Director Alan Rudolph attempts to paint a portrait of the backstage world of rock 'n' roll but is considerably less successful here than in his other inventive efforts". People wrote, "As portrayed by rock heavy Meat Loaf, Redfish is pure delight, innocent and irresistible; in his first starring role he doesn’t sing a note and still steals the movie. Not that there’s much to steal. Coyly billed as 'the story of a boy and his equipment,' the movie has plenty of paraphernalia, but no notion of how to use it. Director Alan (Welcome to L.A.) Rudolph has signed on Hank Williams Jr., Alice Cooper and Blondie to lend musical authenticity, yet there is no semblance of a story line, apart from an unlikely love affair between Loaf and a tiresome groupie, Kaki Hunter."

The Radio Times wrote, "Alan Rudolph punctuates this straightforward tale with tiresome bar room brawls and noisy knockabout comic moments made bearable only by the occasional celebrity cameo". The Austin Chronicle wrote, "Upon actual viewing of Roadie, I admit to being something less than rollicked, but damned if Roadie didn't try with all its cornball might."

Nathan Rabin reviewed the film favorably for its DVD release, writing, "Rudolph's predilection for the lush glamour of classic films might make him an odd director for a Meat Loaf vehicle, but 1980's Roadie (just released on a no-frills DVD) is a marriage made in heaven rather than the shotgun wedding it initially appears to be".

The review aggregate Rotten Tomatoes gave the film a score of 14% based on 7 reviews.

Cowriter Michael Ventura later wrote he disliked what Alan Rudolph did to the script:

Alan’s trouble was he didn’t know anything about fun, knew less about funnin’, and didn’t know (and didn’t want to know) people like us. He shot our script as though it was a cross between TV’s Hee Haw and The Dukes of Hazzard. He didn’t respect the people we wrote about and loved. He filmed them as though they were freaks – or slobs too ditzy to wipe barbecue sauce from their mouths. (That’s not a metaphor; it’s in the picture.) He moved and jiggled his camera as actors spoke their lines... And Alan was flat mean to women who looked like maybe they didn’t go to college. His camera laughed at them.... Alan took himself oh so seriously, far too seriously to identify with our characters. He made a movie to laugh at derisively, not a movie to laugh with in solidarity.

Rudolph later made Endangered Species for the same producer.

== Soundtrack ==
The film's soundtrack album was released in 1980, earning a four out of five rating from AllMusic.

Side 1

- "Everything Works If You Let It" – Cheap Trick
- "You Better Run" – Pat Benatar
- "Brainlock" – The Joe Ely Band
- "Road Rats" (new version) – Alice Cooper with Utopia

Side 2

- "Can't We Try" – Teddy Pendergrass
- "Drivin' My Life Away" – Eddie Rabbitt
- " Your Precious Love" – Stephen Bishop & Yvonne Elliman
- "A Man Needs a Woman" – Jay Ferguson

Side 3

- "Crystal Ball" (live) – Styx
- "Double Yellow Line" – Sue Saad and the Next
- "Ring of Fire" (live) – Blondie
- "Pain" (new version) – Alice Cooper with Utopia

Side 4

- "That Lovin' You Feelin' Again" – Roy Orbison & Emmylou Harris
- "(Hot Damn) I'm a One Woman Man" – Jerry Lee Lewis
- "The American Way" – Hank Williams, Jr.
- "Texas, Me and You" – Asleep at the Wheel

=== Charts ===
Chart (1980)	Position
Australia (Kent Music Report)	82

== DVD Release ==
On August 20, 2013, Shout! Factory released Roadie on Blu-ray.
