= Carolyn Pfeiffer =

American film producer

- Born: Washington, D.C., U.S.
- Education: Guilford College
- Occupation: Film producer
- Spouse: Jon Bradshaw

Carolyn Pfeiffer is an American film producer.

== Early life and career ==
Carolyn Pfeiffer was born in Washington, D.C., and grew up in Madison, North Carolina. After attending Guilford College she moved to Europe and began a career in motion pictures. She first worked in Rome as Claudia Cardinale's assistant on films including Federico Fellini's 8 ½, Luchino Visconti's The Leopard and Blake Edwards’ The Pink Panther. She then moved to Paris and worked as an associate producer for Alain Delon's production company. Within a year she joined Omar Sharif as his executive assistant and worked on many of his films including Doctor Zhivago. Four years later Pfeiffer moved to London and started her own public relations company.

== Island Alive...Alive Films ==
>

Moving to Los Angeles, Pfeiffer formed Alive Films with Shep Gordon. They produced Roadie starring Meat Loaf and Return Engagement, a feature documentary on the Timothy Leary/G. Gordon Liddy debates (both directed by Alan Rudolph) before joining Chris Blackwell to form Island Alive, a groundbreaking independent production/distribution company. Films produced and/or released during Pfeiffer's presidency include Choose Me, El Norte, Koyaanisqatsi, Stop Making Sense, Insignificance, The Hit, A Private Function and Kiss of the Spider Woman.

Back as Co-Chair of Alive Films and continuing her long partnership with Gordon, Pfeiffer produced a series of films for the company: Alan Rudolph's Trouble in Mind and The Moderns, Gregory Nava's A Time of Destiny, Lindsay Anderson's The Whales of August, Mary Lambert's Grand Isle and Sam Shepard's Far North and Silent Tongue.

They also released a number of films including the French sensation, Betty Blue, an Academy Award nominee and Maximilian Schell's record-breaking Marlene, also an Academy Award nominee. In 1987, the company through its relations with Nelson Entertainment, which had a home video division Embassy Home Entertainment, had two additional 1987 film starts through parent company Alive Enterprises. It had agreements with director John Carpenter and Andre Blay, with partner Larry Franco, and as well as with director Wes Craven. It also partnered with Columbia Pictures on the film Destiny.

During this time Pfeiffer married journalist/writer Jon Bradshaw. In 1983 they adopted a daughter Shannon Bradshaw.

== Jamaica ==
Between 1993 and 1999, following the death of Jon Bradshaw, Pfeiffer and her daughter Shannon moved to Jamaica where, with her brother Bill, she owned the master franchise for TCBY for the island. They built four stores and an airport outlet and were awarded TCBY's Award For Excellence in 1997. She also produced three Jamaican feature films. Two of them were vanguard movies shot digitally for Chris Blackwell's Palm Pictures: Dancehall Queen and Third World Cop. To date they are the highest-grossing films released in the Caribbean.

== Burnt Orange Productions ==
Pfeiffer returned to Los Angeles to become the founding President of The Los Angeles Film School and then Vice Chair and Master Filmmaker-in-Residence at the American Film Institute Conservatory.

She was later invited to become founding President and CEO of Burnt Orange Productions part of the Film Initiative of the University of Texas at Austin. The mission of Burnt Orange was to produce films where students worked as apprentices and interns alongside professional filmmakers. In three years Burnt Orange produced The Quiet, acquired by Screen Gems and released by Sony Classics, Adam Rifkin's Homo Erectus, distributed by National Lampoon in 2008, The Cassidy Kids, distributed by B-Side and broadcast on IFC in 2008 and Elvis and Annabelle distributed by The Weinstein Company in 2009.

Pfeiffer resides in Marfa, Texas, where she continues her work as a producer. In 2013 she executive produced Cory Van Dyke's Far Marfa, in 2015 Hector Galan's award-winning PBS documentary Children of Giant, and in 2018/2019 Keith Maitland's Dear Mr. Brody, which was theatrically released and broadcast on Discovery in 2022. In 2019 she produced a one-woman play, Ilsa by William Benton, starring Kate O'Toole and directed by Richard Maxwell of New York City Players. In 2022 she executive produced Robert Irwin: A Desert of Pure Feeling, a documentary on the famed light and space artist directed by Jennifer Lane released theatrically and on a number of streaming platforms.

During 2020 Pfeiffer collaborated on a book of Jon Bradshaw's writings titled The Ocean Is Closed which was published by Ze Books in 2021. Her own memoir, Chasing the Panther: Adventures & Misadventures of a Cinematic Life (co-written with Gregory Collins) was published by Harper Horizon in June 2023.

Pfeiffer is a member of the Academy of Motion Picture Arts and Sciences and GreenLight Women, and the former President of IFP West (now Film Independent).

== Works ==
- Chasing the Panther: Adventures & Misadventures of a Cinematic Life. Harper Horizon. 2023. ISBN 978-0-7852-5518-5.
