= Endangered Species (1982 film) =

1982 science fiction film directed by Alan Rudolph

- Directed by: Alan Rudolph
- Written by: Alan Rudolph; John Binder; Judson Klinger; Richard Clayton Woods
- Produced by: Carolyn Pfeiffer
- Starring: Robert Urich; JoBeth Williams; Paul Dooley; Hoyt Axton; Peter Coyote; Marin Kanter
- Cinematography: Paul Lohmann
- Edited by: Tom Walls
- Music by: Gary Wright
- Production company: Metro-Goldwyn-Mayer
- Distributed by: MGM/UA Distribution Co.
- Release dates: September 9, 1982 (Buffalo, Wyoming); September 10, 1982 (U.S.)
- Running time: 97 minutes
- Country: United States
- Language: English
- Budget: $7 million or $10 million
- Box office: $1.48 million

Endangered Species is a 1982 American science fiction horror film directed and co-written by Alan Rudolph, and starring Robert Urich, JoBeth Williams, Peter Coyote, and Hoyt Axton. It follows a former New York City police officer (Urich) who relocates to a rural Colorado town, where a newly appointed sheriff (Williams) is investigating a series of bizarre cattle mutilations.

== Plot ==
Ruben Castle, a brutish and alcoholic New York City police officer, quits his job and becomes sober, allowing him to reunite with his estranged teenage daughter, Mackenzie. Ruben decides to bring Mackenzie with him to Colorado, where he plans to start a new life. En route, the pair become stranded near the rural small town of Buffalo after their trailer suffers a tire blowout. Mackenzie rushes in her father's car to find a tow truck, and crashes into the vehicle of the newly appointed town sheriff, Harriet Perdue. Ruben and Mackenzie park their trailer in a campground, and become acquainted with the townspeople. Ruben encounters Harriet several times, and learns she is investigating a series of mysterious cattle mutilations, which have spurred conspiracy theories among locals ranging from UFOs to a Satanic cult in the area.

Ruben and Harriet strike a friendship over their shared careers as police officers. One night, Harriet gives Ruben a ride, and is called to the scene of a burning barn, where Harriet unsuccessfully attempts to save a bull. Meanwhile, Mackenzie, who is on a date with Wayne, a local deputy, witnesses a car speeding from the barn and decides to follow it into a wrecking yard. A crash ensues between the two vehicles, and two men are apprehended for the arson, which they staged to inspire fear in the townspeople.

Local newspaper publisher Joe Hiatt provides Ruben background on the cattle mutilations, which have been plaguing Colorado and Wyoming, and recounts sightings of strange black helicopters flying over the region. Meanwhile, Joe publishes editorials about the events, alienating him from the town mayor, as well as local cattle baron Ben Morgan. Ruben reluctantly grows fascinated with the events. After relapsing and getting drunk one night, Ruben visits Harriet and makes sexual advances toward her, but she rebuffs him. Ruben leaves and encounters a large grain mill truck driving erratically, leading him to follow the vehicle to a rural fenced industrial compound.

The next morning, ranchers bring a mutilated cow found on their property to the doorstep of the police station, creating a cause célèbre. Ruben inquires to Joe about the grain truck he saw the night before, and Joe informs him the fenced complex is an abandoned military outpost. Ruben begins drinking heavily again. Shortly after, Joe is found dead in his office, attributed to a heart attack.

Harriet sends samples of the cattle organs to a pathologist in New York, who informs her that the tissue is riddled with the bacteria clostridium botulinum, which appears to have been modified via gene splicing. The pathologist indicates that his knowledge of the only surfacing of such bacteria was in government experiments conducted in 1969 researching germ warfare. Meanwhile, Ruben covertly visits Ben's ranch. He witnesses a black helicopter land, and a mercenary named Steele confront Ben, who has been coerced by his nephew, a Washington, D.C. politician, to allow them to use his cattle for medical experiments. Steele threatens Ben and reprimands him for not silencing Joe. Later that night, Ruben departs to Ben's ranch, where he begins shooting down equipment used to procure the cattle. He is chased by a black helicopter, but hides in a cattle corral.

The following morning, Ruben leaves Mackenzie at the airport to take a flight back to New York, but she is abducted by mercenaries before boarding the plane. Meanwhile, Ruben confronts Ben at his office, finding him mysteriously ill and vomiting blood. Ruben forces Ben to drive him to the ranch at gunpoint, but Ben crashes the car and stumbles onto the road before his abdomen inexplicably bursts, eviscerating him. Harriet is forced to arrest Ruben for kidnapping, though she insists to her superiors that both Joe and Ben were murdered due to their knowledge of the cattle experimentation. Ruben is visited in his jail cell by an operative who threatens him, insisting that if he remain quiet for 24 hours, Mackenzie will be spared.

Ruben and Harriet flee to the military outpost and manage to sneak inside. Shortly after, a fleet of police officers and vigilantes descend on the complex. Ruben holds Steele at gunpoint, while Harriet locates Mackenzie. In the rafters of the warehouse, Steele stabs Ruben, who responds by shooting him, causing Steele to fall to his death. Peck and several other operatives open fire, before the three flee on foot as the trucks depart. Outside, police and vigilantes open fire on one of the helicopters, shooting down a dead cow it is lifting. The large group of townspeople, along with Ruben, Harriet, and Mackenzie, watch as the helicopters flee into the distance.

== Cast ==
- Robert Urich as Ruben Castle
- JoBeth Williams as Harriet Perdue
- Hoyt Axton as Ben Morgan
- Peter Coyote as Steele
- Dan Hedaya as Peck
- Paul Dooley as Joe Hiatt
- Marin Kanter as Mackenzie Castle
- Gailard Sartain as The Mayor
- Harry Carey Jr. as Dr. Emmer
- John Considine as Burnside
- Patrick Houser as Chester
- Alvin Crow as Deputy Wayne
- Ned Dowd as Deputy Bobby
- Kent Rizley as Deputy Ray
- Heather Menzies as Susan

== Production ==
=== Development ===
The film was based on a story by producer Zalman King, which in turn was inspired by cattle mutilations that had been reported in America since 1967. Journalists Judson Klinger and Richard Clayton Woods spent two years of researching cattle mutilations by interviewing ranchers, law enforcement officials, scientists, and other individuals who had knowledge or experience with the phenomenon across ten states, while also gathering photographs and data. Klinger and Woods employed their research in writing the film's original screenplay, which touched upon explanations ranging from Satanic cults to extraterrestrial culpability to secret bio-warfare experiments.

Director Alan Rudolph made the film as part of a two picture deal he had with producers Zalman King and Carolyn Pfeiffer, the first having been Roadie (1980). Rudolph found the idea ofEndangered Species interesting and asked to have "a crack at the screenplay." He and co-writer John Binder revised the screenplay, ultimately crafting an explanation commenting on abuse of power inspired by the Watergate scandal.

Finance came from MGM then under the stewardship of David Begelman. Rudolph wanted to cast Robert Mitchum or Lee Marvin in the lead, particularly Mitchum, but MGM refused and gave the director a list of actors it had under contract "completely different from what I'd imagined."

=== Filming ===
Principal photography of Endangered Species took place in Buffalo, Wyoming in the fall of 1981.

According to Rudolph, filming was delayed a year due to the Writers' Guild strike and the movie was affected by executive interference:

MGM was in deep shit. Their theatrical releases during the strike mostly bombed. The top executive [Begelman] became harsh and abusive. The second week of filming he shut us down altogether, hating my naturalistic look and they fired the cameraman and lighting crew. I tried to quit but my contract forbade it. The experience lost its essential spirit and never recovered. I tried my professional best, mainly for the actors but it became an out-of-body event, I was already out of my mind.

The mutilated Cattle carcasses were recreated using cattle scheduled to be sent to the slaughterhouse with the carcasses dressed in a recreation of the photographs and placed in cold storage until they were needed in the scene. Rudolph said "While filming in Wyoming, we came across carcasses that appeared overnight in a snowy field, organs removed with surgical precision but here was no blood or tracks, NASA thought it was aliens."

Rudolph claimed "The original tampering studio boss was fired just before we finished our edit and the new tampering boss demanded more cuts, eliminating my final scene, which had put a twist into everything. The new tampering boss was eventually fired and the movie remains what it is forever."

He reflected, "It was like somebody had ripped my guts out... It was insanity, the worst experience."

== Release ==
Endangered Species had its world premiere in Buffalo, Wyoming on September 9, 1982, before opening wide nationally the following day, September 10.

=== Critical response ===
Vincent Canby of The New York Times found the idea of the film ripped from then current headlines of cattle mutilations, and praised the efforts of the cast and editor to make the material of the film realistic, but that the film overall was "dumb." Kevin Thomas of the Los Angeles Times declared the film a "taut political thriller... as chilling as it is persuasive."

TV Guide awarded the film three out of five stars, praising the cast and blaming the film's commercial failure on poor distribution by Metro-Goldwyn Mayer. They especially recommended the film for fans of director Alan Rudolph, and praised the effects of the low-flying helicopters snatching cows from their pastures at night. John Stanley of Creature Feature also liked the film, giving it 3.5 out of 5 stars. finding it thrilling and enthralling.

Filmink argued "Urich was miscast in the lead, a role that should have been played by Robert Mitchum – but he wasn’t as badly miscast as Rudolph was behind the camera."

=== Home media ===
The Warner Archive Collection released Endangered Species on DVD on August 2, 2010. In May 2023, Scream Factory released the film for the first time on Blu-ray.

== Sources ==
- Brereton, Pat (2005). Hollywood Utopia: Ecology in Contemporary American Cinema. New York City, New York: Intellect Books. ISBN 978-1-841-50117-8.
- Stanley, John (2000). Creature Features: The Science Fiction, Fantasy, and Horror Movie Guide (Third ed.). New York City, New York: Berkeley Boulevard Books. ISBN 978-0-425-17517-0.
