= Hooked (book) =

Book by Pauline Kael

First edition (publ. E. P. Dutton)

Hooked: Film Writings, 1985–88 (1989) is the ninth collection of movie reviews by the critic Pauline Kael, covering the period from July 1985 to June 1988. All articles in the book originally appeared in The New Yorker.

She reviews more than 170 films giving rich praise to the work of directors and performers she admires - in this collection for example, Robert Altman; Alan Rudolph - for his film Songwriter; Nick Nolte; Susan Sarandon; Melanie Griffith; Lesley Ann Warren; Steve Martin in Roxanne. And she attacks what she regards as second rate, for example, George Lucas, -"George Lucas should believe less in himself - he keeps trying to come up with an original idea, and he can't"; and the film Heartbreak Ridge - "It would take a board of inquiry made up of gods to determine whether this picture is more offensive aesthetically, psychologically, morally, or politically."

The films she recommends include:

- The Best of Times
- Dreamchild
- Sweet Dreams
- Down and Out in Beverly Hills
- Compromising Positions
- My Beautiful Laundrette
- Mona Lisa
- Salvador
- Club Paradise
- Mike's Murder
- Blue Velvet
- She's Gotta Have It
- Re-Animator
- Something Wild
- Hour of the Star
- The Stepfather
- Law of Desire
- Raising Arizona
- Brazil
- Roxanne
- Tampopo
- Eat the Peach
- The Witches of Eastwick
- Wish You Were Here
- Hamburger Hill
- Hope and Glory
- Weeds
- The Dead
- The Lonely Passion of Judith Hearne
- Moonstruck
- The Unbearable Lightness of Being
- High Tide
- High Season
- Pass the Ammo
- Hairspray
- Matador
- Beetlejuice
- Masquerade
- A World Apart
- Bull Durham

The title refers to her film 'addiction'. "I got hooked on movies at an early age, (around 4 or 5, when I saw them while sitting on my parents' laps), and I am still a child before a moving image. Movies seem to me the most mysteriously great of all art forms."

The book is out-of-print in the United States, but is still published by Marion Boyars Publishers in the United Kingdom.
