= Choose Me =

1984 film by Alan Rudolph

- Theatrical release poster
- Directed by: Alan Rudolph
- Written by: Alan Rudolph
- Produced by: Carolyn Pfeiffer; David Blocker
- Starring: Geneviève Bujold; Keith Carradine; Lesley Ann Warren; Rae Dawn Chong; Patrick Bauchau
- Cinematography: Jan Kiesser
- Edited by: Mia Goldman
- Music by: Phil Woods; Luther Vandross; Teddy Pendergrass (title song)
- Production company: Island Alive
- Distributed by: Island Alive
- Release dates: May 1984 (Cannes); August 29, 1984 (United States)
- Running time: 106 minutes
- Country: United States
- Language: English
- Budget: $835,000 or $985,000
- Box office: $7 million US)

Choose Me is a 1984 American romantic comedy-drama film written and directed by Alan Rudolph, starring Geneviève Bujold, Keith Carradine, and Lesley Ann Warren. Set in 1980s Los Angeles, the film follows the romantic lives of several characters in and around a dive bar, including its owner, Eve; Mickey, a drifter recently released from a psychiatric hospital; and Nancy, a French radio host of a romance advice show who has recently become Eve's roommate.

Rudolph later said the film "in a vague way, is about lies, truth, persona, and isolation. I always felt LA was really about those things."

== Plot ==
A man named Mickey is released from a mental hospital where his stories are perceived as lies. Looking for someone named Eve, he returns to Los Angeles. Mickey eventually arrives at a bar called Eve's Lounge. Its new owner is a former call girl also named Eve. According to her, she bought the bar after the old owner killed herself, "over some guy". Eve refuses to commit to any one man, thinking that she ruined too many marriages to have one of her own. That night, Eve rebuffs Mickey's advances and has sex with a bartender, while avoiding Zack, the wealthy married man she is having an affair with.

That night, French radio talk show host Dr. Nancy Love dispenses relationship advice, despite the fact that she herself has been unable to maintain a successful relationship. She answers Eve's ad for a roommate to share her house and soon moves in. Concealing her identity, Nancy counsels Eve through her radio show. Meanwhile, Zack's wife Pearl secretly begins to haunt the bar hoping to catch him in flagrante.

Mickey returns to the bar the next night when he cannot pay for a bus ticket home to Las Vegas. Pearl talks to Mickey, who reveals that he taught poetry, was a photographer and was a former soldier. Pearl offers to get him into a hot card game where he can obtain the money for a ticket home. Mickey eventually kisses Pearl and asks her to marry him. She calls Mickey crazy, invites him to drop by her place, and gives him Eve's address and phone number. At the game, Mickey wins big, earning the ire of Zack. Zack warns Mickey not to return, before going to meet Eve. She in turn sends Zack away, announcing that their affair is over.

Mickey goes to Pearl's apartment to crash, and eventually begins taking pictures as she sleeps. Zack walks in and attacks Mickey, pulling a gun and taking back the money he lost. He slaps Pearl after Mickey runs out, assuming that they had sex.

Mickey calls Eve's house, and Nancy who answers the phone, invites him to come over and crash. When he arrives, Nancy tells him that Eve is not home. She allows him into the house, where he bathes and eats. She eventually snoops in his suitcase, finding memorabilia showing the truth of his stories and travels. The two later have sex. He then asks her to marry him and accompany him to Las Vegas. Nancy tells him to leave before she goes to work.

Eve calls into Nancy's show, torn between her attraction for Mickey and her fear of making another mistake. Nancy's post-coital euphoria overcomes her normal intellectual approach, and she encourages Eve to give in to her feelings. When Mickey comes looking for Eve at the bar that night, she is almost ready to let him into her life, when Zack appears and assaults Mickey again. Eve takes off while they are fighting, and at her home she is confronted by Nancy, who tells her everything. Nancy then proposes that they should "share" Mickey's affection. Devastated, Eve says that Nancy can have him, before rushing out.

Mickey returns to Eve's house to recover his suitcase. Zack finds him there and assaults him again. Mickey prevails, recovering the money and the suitcase. He tries to catch a ride to the bus station, but spies Eve on the roof of the bar, and races up to see her. She pulls a gun and threatens to kill herself until he does the same; Mickey pulls a gun and promises to shoot himself the moment Eve tells him to. Eve then breaks down and they embrace. While crying, Eve reveals that her gun is not loaded, and Mickey adds that his isn’t either.

Mickey and Eve later take a bus as a couple to Las Vegas. A fellow passenger eventually asks if they are gambling; Eve reveals that they are about to get married.

== Cast ==
- Geneviève Bujold as Nancy
- Keith Carradine as Mickey
- Lesley Ann Warren as Eve
- Patrick Bauchau as Zack Antoine
- Rae Dawn Chong as Pearl Antoine
- John Larroquette as Billy Ace
- Edward Ruscha as Ralph Chomsky
- Gailard Sartain as Mueller
- John Considine as Dr. Ernest Greene (voice)

== Production ==
=== Development ===
Director Alan Rudolph had previously made the documentary Return Engagement (1983) for Island Alive, a newly-formed film company by Shep Gordon and Carolyn Pfeiffer.

Gordon offered around $500,000 to commission Rudolph to direct a music video for "You're My Choice Tonight (Choose Me)" by Teddy Pendergrass, who was paralyzed in a 1982 car crash. Rudolph suggested making a feature film, for a few hundred thousand dollars more instead. Rudolph wrote a figure down on a napkin which he said was $639,000.

Rudolph called the movie "a limited production. Like those films, it took advantage of its limitations and limitations tend to disappear that way."

Rudolph started planning the film without a completed script as "I wanted the screenplay to come bursting out once I was fully programmed" He said producer David Blocker "kept asking what the scenes were about and I said people in inexpensive places talking." Rudolph listened to the Pendergrass song repeatedly for inspiration, summarizing it as "romantic roulette". Rudolph wrote the film's screenplay over the course of one week. His premise was "a pathological liar who only told the truth and the women who love him." While writing he overheard Dr Toni Grant giving advice on the radio, which led to the character of Dr. Nancy Love.

=== Filming ===
Rudolph later said "I purged myself of the past and everybody involved in that film on our side of the camera was doing it for the first time. I got a first-time producer, a first-time cameraman, everybody. Moved everybody up. Did it in three weeks."

The film's production design budget was limited to around $10,000, with the major set being a smoke-filled bar. Rudolph found a deserted street on the edge of downtown Los Angeles and created a neon-lit set for the film's fictional location, Eve's Lounge. Both Choose Me and Night of the Comet (1984) used the 300 block of Boyd Street as a filming location.

Costume designer Tracy Peacock Tynan (Kenneth Peacock Tynan's daughter) recalls that budget was so small ($640,000) that she couldn’t budget second costumes for actors if outfits were damaged or needed dry cleaning.

Principal photography was completed in three weeks. According to Rudolph, "virtually everyone on the production was working at short money." He said that during filming "we were doing something I knew was working and I didn't care what anyone thought about it."

The original script ended with Pearl opening her apartment door to Nancy, who was answering a roommate-wanted ad. However that scene was scheduled on the final day of Pearl's location, and they were unable to shoot the final scene. So the movie ended with Mickey and Eve on their honeymoon. "It probably would have anyway," said Rudolph.

=== Post-production ===
Rudolph recalled that, "during editing, [he] wanted to use some old Teddy songs that unfortunately weren’t under Shep Gordon’s control. This would cost money we didn’t have so to pay for it, I agreed to take a directing job (Songwriter 1984) that everyone was turning down."

== Release ==
Choose Me was screened out of competition at the 1984 Cannes Film Festival, as well as other festivals, including the Toronto International Film Festival, and the Independent Spirit Awards. It opened theatrically in the United States on August 29, 1984.

=== Home media ===
Metro-Goldwyn-Mayer released Choose Me on DVD in 2001. The Criterion Collection released the film on 4K and Blu-ray on March 25, 2025, with a restoration supervised by director Alan Rudolph and producer David Blocker.

== Reception ==
=== Box office ===
Choose Me earned $2,490,233 at the United States box office.

=== Critical response ===
On the review aggregator website Rotten Tomatoes, 95% of 20 critics' reviews are positive. Metacritic, which uses a weighted average, assigned the film a score of 76 out of 100, based on 8 critics, indicating "generally favorable" reviews.

The film is reviewed favorably in Pauline Kael's eighth collection of film reviews State of the Art: "The love roundelay. Choose Me, written and directed by Alan Rudolph, on a budget of $835,000, is pleasantly bananas. The songs are performed by Teddy Pendergrass and he's just right. The entire movie has a lilting, loose, choreographic flow to it...it's giddy in a magical, pseudo-sultry way, it seems to be set in a poet's dream of a red-light district... this low-budget comedy-fantasy has some of the most entertaining (and best-sustained) performances I've seen all year." Gene Siskel and Roger Ebert both praised the film on their television show, At the Movies. Sheila Benson of the Los Angeles Times praised the film as "many-layered and funny... an L.A. flower, a neon orchid–hip, outrageous, and beautiful... If at times it teeters toward self-parody, it fortunately contains its own gyroscope, which keeps spinning in blissful romantic arcs."

Janet Maslin, reviewing the film in The New York Times, wrote: "Fortunately, Mr. Rudolph has paid perhaps even more attention to the film's minor touches than he has to its central action. Abundant, well-chosen paintings and posters comment on the characters, and the supporting cast includes the painter Ed Ruscha in a small but conspicuous role." Vincent Canby, reviewing the film, three months later, in The New York Times, wrote: "The cast...couldn't be better...There's a wonderful feeling of ensemble playing... plus Teddy Pendergrass, who is never seen but whose blues songs on the soundtrack underscore the screen action as if they were ironic subtitles, which are never to be taken too seriously, but simply enjoyed for the sly, knowing fun of them...Rudolph's favorite movie set is Los Angeles... as much a fairy-tale town as the Emerald City. It's this quality that makes Choose Me an adult fable of such expressive charm.

Ted Mahar of The Oregonian described the film as a "paradoxical, complex comedy," praising the nuanced characters and Rudolph's screenplay. Alan G. Artner of the Chicago Tribune also commended the film's portrayal of its characters, writing: "Rudolph puts his characters under a microscope where they keep wriggling until all of them have bumped. How each and every combination occurs is, at times, quite ingenious."

In Cinefile.info, Ben Sachs writes that Choose Me shows the influence of Robert Altman, in juggling multiple characters, with the film evoking "an intoxicating, amorous mood, the bold neon colors and balletic camera movements evoking a world where love is always in the air. Alternately funny, seductive, and unnerving, Choose Me channels the chaotic rush of emotions that comes with falling in love as few other movies do."

== See also ==
- round dance
- La Ronde (play), written by Arthur Schnitzler in 1897
- List of American films of 1984

== Sources ==
- Falsetto, Mario (1999). Personal visions : conversations with independent film-makers. London: Constable.
- Flinn, Caryl (2023). Alan Rudolph's Trouble in Mind: Tampering with Myths. Ann Arbor, Michigan: University of Michigan Press. ISBN 978-0-472-90378-8.
- Kael, Pauline (1985). State of the Art. New York City, New York: Dutton. ISBN 978-0-525-24369-4.
