= Dirk Blocker =

American actor (born 1957)

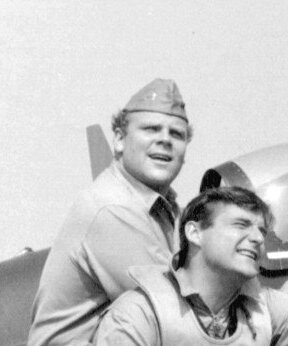
- Blocker in 1976
- Born: Dennis Dirk Blocker; July 31, 1957 (age 69); Los Angeles, California, U.S.
- Occupation: Actor
- Years active: 1974–2023
- Television: Jerry Bragg on Baa Baa Black Sheep (1976–1978); Detective Hitchcock on Brooklyn Nine-Nine (2013–2021)
- Spouse: Danielle Aubuchon (m. 1990)
- Children: 2
- Parent(s): Dan Blocker (father); Dolphia Parker (mother)
- Relatives: David Blocker (brother)

Dennis Dirk Blocker (born July 31, 1957) is a retired American actor. He earned his first regular TV role on Baa Baa Black Sheep (1976–1978), playing pilot Jerry Bragg. From 2013 until 2021, he starred as Detective Michael Hitchcock on the Fox/NBC comedy series Brooklyn Nine-Nine. Born in Los Angeles, California, he is the son of actor Dan Blocker and Dolphia Lee Blocker (née Parker). His brother is producer David Blocker.

== Career ==
Blocker appeared onscreen for the first time with his father in a 1964 car commercial. He began appearing on American television in 1974, acting in an episode of Marcus Welby, M.D. at the age of 16. He has had guest roles in ER; Little House on the Prairie; The X-Files; Beverly Hills, 90210; Walker, Texas Ranger; Night Court; Murder, She Wrote; M*A*S*H; Doogie Howser, M.D.; Matlock; Quantum Leap and CHiPs. At age 19, he was cast in the role of 1st Lt. Jerry Bragg on the military drama Baa Baa Black Sheep (1976–1978). He did not have another regular TV series role until being cast in Brooklyn Nine-Nine (2013–2021).

He played a supporting role in Bonanza: The Return as a reporter named Walter Fenster, and again in the 1995 film Bonanza: Under Attack.

An article published by NBC states that (at an unspecified date) "Blocker went back to school to earn his bachelor of arts degree so he could teach K-12" and in 2017, published a book that he had written, Master and the Little Monk, about "a lonely young boy who is befriended by a unique ally and mentor".

His film credits include Midnight Madness (1980), Raise the Titanic (1980), The Border (1982), Poltergeist (1982), Starman (1984), Trouble in Mind (1985), Made in Heaven (1987), Prince of Darkness (1987), Pink Cadillac (1989), Cutting Class (1989), Equinox (1992), Short Cuts (1993), Night of the Scarecrow (1995), and Mad City (1997).

== Filmography ==
Year	Title	Role	Notes
1974	Marcus Welby, M.D.	Benji	1 Episode
1974	Little House on the Prairie	Abel Makay	Episode "School Mom"
1974	Lucas Tanner	Jordan Adair	1 Episode
1975	The Family Holvak	Pete	1 Episode
1976	Phyllis	Jack	1 Episode
1976	Bridger	Joe Meek	TV Movie
1976–78	Baa Baa Black Sheep	1st Lt. Jerome "Jerry" Bragg	Main Role
1978	CHiPs	Turk	1 Episode
1979	B. J. and the Bear	Jimmy Lee	1 Episode
1980	Midnight Madness	Blaylak – Green Team	
1980	Raise the Titanic	Merker	
1981	M*A*S*H	James Mathes	Episode: Identity Crisis
1982	The Border	Beef	
1982	Poltergeist	Jeff Shaw	
1982	Two of a Kind	Barry	TV Movie
1984	Starman	Cop #1	
1985	Trouble in Mind	Rambo	
1987	Hunter	Randall	Episode: The Jade Woman
1987	Made in Heaven	Shorty	
1987	Prince of Darkness	Mullins	
1988	MacGyver	Chuck	Episode: Blood Brothers
1988	Born to Race	Bud	
1988	Newhart	Little Duke Mulberry	Episode: I Came, I Saw, I Sat
1989	Cutting Class	Coach Harris	TV movie
1989	Pink Cadillac	Policeman #1	
1989	21 Jump Street	Officer Ross	Episode: Things We Said Today
1990	Love at Large	Hiram Culver, Used-Car Salesman	
1992	Equinox	Red	
1993	Short Cuts	Diner Customer	
1993	River of Rage	Sheriff Mapes	TV Movie
1993	Bonanza: The Return	Walter Fenster	TV Movie
1994	Murder, She Wrote	Sheriff Jim Monday	Episode: Roadkill
1994	The John Larroquette Show	Tom Tuttle	Episode: Another Average Night
1995	Bonanza: Under Attack	Fenster	TV movie
1995	Walker, Texas Ranger	Buford Pike	Episodes: Trust No One
1995	Night of the Scarecrow	George	
1996	The Siege at Ruby Ridge	Undercover agent	uncredited
1996	Larger Than Life	Airport Security Man	
1997	Beverly Hills, 90210	Dan the Bartender	Episodes: "Friends, Lovers, and Children" & "Deadline"
1997	Gun	Clifford Sutton	Episode: All the President's Women
1997	Mad City	Bowler #2	
1999	Inherit the Wind	Sheriff Sam Gibson	TV Movie
1999	The X-Files	Mayor Gilmore	Episode: The Rain King
2000	ER	Mr. Groder	Episode: Abby Road
2004	Deadwood	Jay Johnson	Episode: The Trial of Jack McCall
2005	McBride: The Chameleon Murder	Det. Jake Fitzsimmons	TV Movie
2005	Over There	Lon	Episode: Weapons of Mass Destruction
2009	Criminal Minds	Trent	Episode: Pleasure Is My Business
2013–2021	Brooklyn Nine-Nine	Hitchcock	Main Cast; 147 episodes
2016	Advance & Retreat	Dan	TV Movie
2017	There's... Johnny!	Lyle	Episode: The Getaway
2023	Doogie Kameāloha, M.D.	Gordon	Episode: Black Cloud, White Cloud
