= Toyomichi Kurita =

Japanese cinematographer

- 栗田 豊道
- Born: Toyomichi Kurita; 1950 (age 75–76); Mito, Ibaraki, Japan
- Education: AFI Conservatory
- Years active: 1974–2021

Japanese name
- Kanji: 栗田 豊道
- Hiragana: くりた とよみち
- Katakana: クリタ トヨミチ
Transcriptions
- Romanization: Kurita Toyomichi

Toyomichi Kurita (栗田 豊道 Kurita Toyomichi; born 1950) is a Japanese cinematographer, known for productions both from Japan and the United States.

== Filmography ==
Film

Year	Title	Director
1985	Trouble in Mind	Alan Rudolph
1988	The Moderns	Alan Rudolph
1989	Powwow Highway	Jonathan Wacks
1989	Blood Red	Peter Masterson
1989	Shadow of China	Mitsuo Yanagimachi
1991	A Rage in Harlem	Bill Duke
1991	Grand Isle	Mary Lambert
1991	Convicts	Peter Masterson
1993	Moving	Shinji Sōmai
1995	Waiting to Exhale	Forest Whitaker
1996	Infinity	Matthew Broderick
1997	Afterglow	Alan Rudolph
1999	Cookie's Fortune	Robert Altman
1999	Taboo	Nagisa Oshima
2004	First Daughter	Forest Whitaker
2006	Madea's Family Reunion	Tyler Perry
2007	Daddy's Little Girls	Tyler Perry
2007	Sukiyaki Western Django	Takashi Miike
2007	Why Did I Get Married?	Tyler Perry
2008	The Family That Preys	Tyler Perry
2009	Toad's Oil	Koji Yakusho
2010	Why Did I Get Married Too?	Tyler Perry
2011	Madea's Big Happy Family	Tyler Perry
2013	The Brain Man	Tomoyuki Takimoto
2021	Cube *	Yasuhiko Shimizu

* Shared credit with Tomoyuki Kawakami

TV movies

Year	Title	Director	Notes
1994	Lakota Woman: Siege at Wounded Knee	Frank Pierson	With Christopher Tufty
1994	Music for the Movies: Tôru Takemitsu	Charlotte Zwerin	Documentary film
1996	Woman Undone	Evelyn Purcell	
1996	Homecoming	Mark Jean	
1996	Crime of the Century	Mark Rydell	

TV series

Year	Title	Director	Episode
2006	Masters of Horror	Takashi Miike	"Imprint"

== Awards and nominations ==
Year	Award	Category	Title	Result
1985	Independent Spirit Awards	Best Cinematography	Trouble in Mind	Won
1988	Independent Spirit Awards	Best Cinematography	The Moderns	Nominated
1989	Independent Spirit Awards	Best Cinematography	Powwow Highway	Nominated
1999	Japan Academy Film Prize	Outstanding Achievement in Cinematography	Taboo	Nominated
2007	Sitges Film Festival	Best Cinematography	Sukiyaki Western Django	Won
