= John Considine (actor) =

American actor

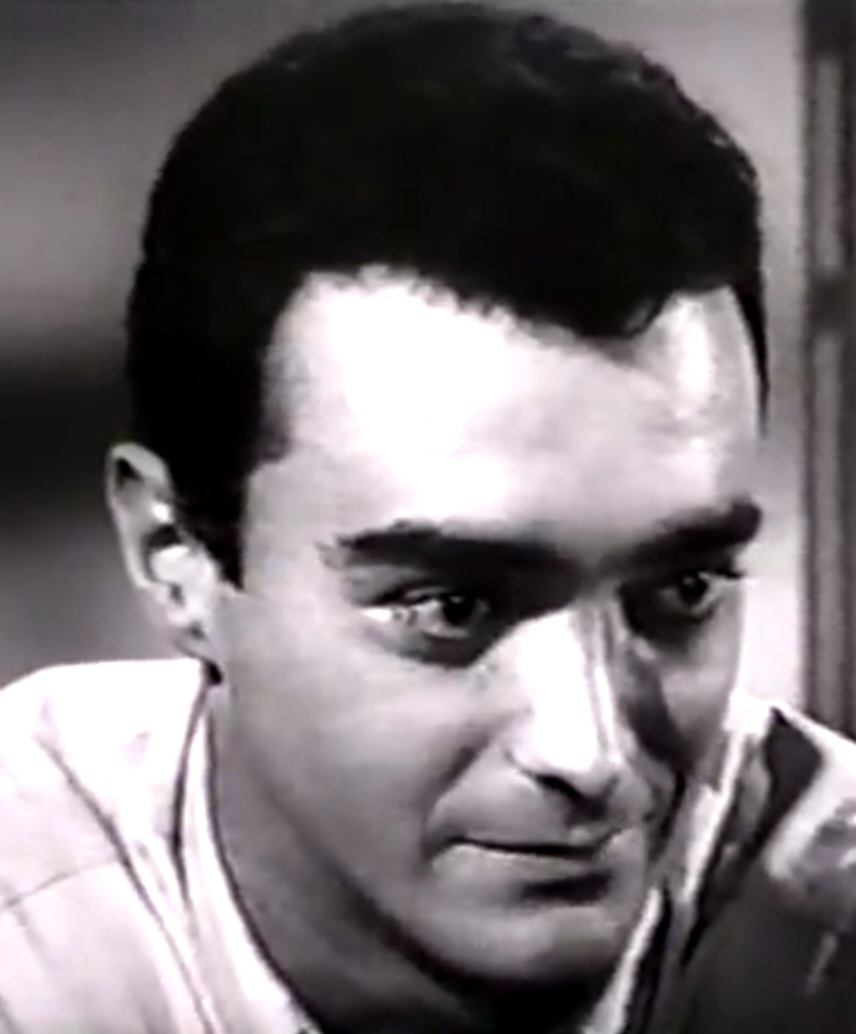
- John Considine in an episode of Lock-Up (1961)
- Born: John William Considine III; January 2, 1935 (age 91); Los Angeles, California, U.S.
- Occupations: Actor; Writer
- Years active: 1960–2007
- Spouses: Toby Considine (m. 1957–1976) Jette Maguire (m. 1980–1984) Astrid Lee Peterson (m. 1984)
- Family: Tim Considine (brother); John Considine (paternal grandfather); Alexander Pantages (maternal grandfather); Bob Considine (paternal uncle)

John William Considine III (born January 2, 1935) is an American retired writer and actor who wrote for and made numerous appearances in film and television from 1960 until 2007.

== Biography ==
=== Early life ===
John William Considine III was born on January 2, 1935 in Los Angeles to producer John Considine Jr. His grandfathers were two pioneering vaudeville impresarios: Alexander Pantages and namesake John Considine Sr. He's the older brother of actor, writer and photographer Tim Considine and the paternal nephew of the late political reporter and newspaper columnist Bob Considine.

=== Career ===
Among the many television series on which Considine has appeared as a guest star are Adventures in Paradise, Surfside Six, The Aquanauts, Lock-Up, Sea Hunt, Ripcord, Combat!, Straightaway, My Favorite Martian, The Twilight Zone, The Outer Limits, Perry Mason, The Fugitive, The F.B.I., Gomer Pyle - U.S.M.C., Marcus Welby, M.D., The Rockford Files and excels cast as psychopathic doctor Lee Yost in the episode, "A Different Drummer", The Devlin Connection, The Eddie Capra Mysteries, Lou Grant, Mannix, Cannon, Taxi, Dynasty, Family, Eight is Enough, Hart to Hart, Remington Steele, Highway to Heaven, The Jeffersons, Hotel, MacGyver, Hardcastle and McCormick, The Colbys, Emerald Point N.A.S., Crazy Like a Fox, Knight Rider, The A-Team, Simon & Simon, Murder, She Wrote, L.A. Law and Boston Legal.

His film career includes roles in The Greatest Story Ever Told (1965), Doctor Death: Seeker of Souls (1973), The Thirsty Dead (1974), Buffalo Bill and the Indians, or Sitting Bull's History Lesson (1976), Welcome to L.A. (1976), The Late Show (1977), When Time Ran Out (1980), Circle of Power (1981), Endangered Species (1982), Choose Me (1984), Trouble in Mind (1985), Fat Man and Little Boy (1989), Coupe de Ville (1990), Free Willy 2: The Adventure Home (1995) and The Book of Stars (1999).

He wrote the original screenplay for – and appeared in – the Robert Altman film A Wedding (1978), and he has had acting roles on several daytime soap operas, including Bright Promise (as Dr. Brian Walsh, 1971–72); The Young and the Restless (as Phillip Chancellor II, 1973–74); and two stints as different characters on Another World (as Vic Hastings, 1974–1976, and as Reginald Love, 1986–1988).

== Filmography ==
=== Film ===
| Year | Title | Role | Notes |
|---|---|---|---|
| 1942 | A Yank at Eton | Boy | Uncredited |
| 1942 | Reunion in France | Little Boy | Uncredited |
| 1946 | The Green Years | Schoolboy | Uncredited |
| 1965 | The Greatest Story Ever Told | John | |
| 1973 | Doctor Death: Seeker of Souls | Dr. Death | |
| 1974 | California Split | Man at Bar | |
| 1974 | The Thirsty Dead | Baru | |
| 1976 | Welcome to LA | Jack Goode | |
| 1976 | Buffalo Bill and the Indians, or Sitting Bull's History Lesson | The Sure Shot's Manager (Frank Butler) (VF : Pierre Fromont) | |
| 1977 | The Late Show | Jeff Lamar | |
| 1978 | A Wedding | Jeff Kuykendall (VF : Jacques Thebault) | |
| 1980 | When Time Ran Out | Webster (VF : Dominique D'ys) | |
| 1981 | Circle of Power | Jordon Carelli | |
| 1982 | Endangered Species | Burnside | |
| 1984 | Choose Me | Dr. Ernest Greene (voice) | |
| 1985 | Trouble in Mind | Nate Nathanson | |
| 1986 | Opposing Force | General McDonald | |
| 1987 | Made in Heaven | Angel | |
| 1989 | Fat Man and Little Boy | Robert Tuckson | |
| 1990 | Coupe de Ville | Professor Kloppner, Eastbrook Academy | |
| 1992 | Exiled in America | Dr. Tom Robinson | |
| 1995 | Free Willy 2: The Adventure Home | Commander Blake | |
| 1997 | Tinseltown | Wolfie | |
| 1999 | The Book of Stars | Lost John | |

=== Television ===
| Year | Title | Role | Notes |
|---|---|---|---|
| 1962 | Combat! | Wayne Temple | Season 1, Episode 10: "I Swear by Apollo" |
| 1963 | The Twilight Zone | McClure | Episode: "The Thirty-Fathom Grave" |
| 1963 | The Outer Limits | Lt. Bertram Cabot | Episode: "The Man Who Was Never Born" |
| 1964 | Perry Mason | Chris Thompson | Episode: "The Case of the Frustrated Folk Singer" |
| 1964 | The Fugitive | Johnny Bodin | Episode: ''Bloodline'' |
| 1967 | The Beverly Hillbillies | Chief Little Fox | Episode: "The Indians Are Coming" |
| 1973 | Cannon | Joe Gorman | Season 3 Episode: "Dead Lady's Tears" |
| 1978 | The Eddie Capra Mysteries | Alex Nukem | Pilot: "Nightmare at Pendragon Castle |
| 1979 | The Rockford Files | Dr. Lee Yost | Episode: "A Different Drummer" |
| 1980 | Eight is Enough | Mr. Andretti | Episode: "Jeremy" |
| 1981 | Hart to Hart | Eliot Knox | Episode: "Harts and Flowers" |
| 1984 | Knight Rider | Boyd LaSalle | Season 3 Episode: "Knight in Disgrace" |
| 1985 | Knight Rider | Phillip Nordstrom | Season 4 Episode: "Knight of the Juggernaut" |
| 1989 | Highway to Heaven | Alex Caulfield | Season 5 Episode: "Summer Camp" |
| 1989 | Murder, She Wrote | Horton Thayer | Season 6 Episode: "Town Father" |
| 1990 | Murder, She Wrote | Porter Finley III | Season 7 Episode: "The Family Jewels" |
| 1991 | Murder, She Wrote | Harry Freelander | Season 8 Episode: "Bite the Big Apple" |
| 1990-1991 | MacGyver | Foxworth, Aaron Sandler, Andrew Lawton | Episodes: "Log Jam", "There but for the Grace", "Off the Wall" |
| 1992 | Batman: The Animated Series | Hackle | Voice, episode: "P.O.V." |

== Bibliography ==
- Improvising: My Life and Show Business (S&L Enterprises, 2012).
- A War: A Boy's Struggle To Survive World War II in Beverly Hills (CreateSpace, 2013).
