= Tim Monsion =

American television and film actor

Tim Monsion is an American television, film and theater actor.

He has had roles in several TV shows such as Desperate Housewives, Frasier, Numb3rs, 7th Heaven, The King of Queens and Mad About You. He has also appeared in films such as Men of Honor, Blink and Every Day Miracles. He originated the role of Dr. Wally in the play Marvin's Room by Scotty McPherson which originated at The Goodman Theater in Chicago. He also played in Marvin's Room at Playwright"s Horizon and Minneta Lane in New York and at the Tiffany Theater in Hollywood with Mary Steenburgen and Jean Smart.
