= Breakfast of Champions (film) =

1999 film

- US DVD cover
- Directed by: Alan Rudolph
- Screenplay by: Alan Rudolph
- Based on: Breakfast of Champions by Kurt Vonnegut Jr.
- Produced by: David Blocker; David Willis
- Starring: Bruce Willis; Albert Finney; Nick Nolte; Barbara Hershey; Glenne Headly; Lukas Haas; Omar Epps; Vicki Lewis; Buck Henry; Ken Campbell; Jake Johannsen
- Cinematography: Elliot Davis
- Edited by: Suzy Elmiger
- Music by: Mark Isham
- Production companies: Hollywood Pictures; Summit Entertainment
- Distributed by: Buena Vista Pictures Distribution
- Release date: September 17, 1999
- Running time: 110 minutes
- Country: United States
- Language: English
- Budget: $12 million
- Box office: $178,278

Breakfast of Champions is a 1999 American satirical black comedy film adapted and directed by Alan Rudolph, from Kurt Vonnegut Jr.'s 1973 novel. The cast included Bruce Willis, Albert Finney, Nick Nolte, Barbara Hershey, Glenne Headly, Lukas Haas and Omar Epps. Though the producers entered it into the 49th Berlin International Film Festival, the film was negatively received by critics and was a box-office bomb that was withdrawn from theatres before going into wide release. While it was released on VHS and DVD in 2000, it was not given a digital release until February 4, 2025.

Filmmaker Ron Mann, under his company Films We Like, subsequently acquired rights to the film from Willis, partnering with Shout! Studios in the United States to theatrically release a 4K restoration on November 1, 2024.

== Plot ==
Dwayne Hoover, a car salesman who is the most respected businessman in Midland City, Indiana, is on the verge of a nervous breakdown, even attempting suicide daily. His wife, Celia, is addicted to pills, and his sales manager and best friend, Harry Le Sabre, is preoccupied with his own secret fondness for wearing lingerie, worried he will be discovered.

Meanwhile, a little-known science fiction author, Kilgore Trout, is hitchhiking across the United States to speak at Midland City's arts festival. In search of answers for his identity quest, Hoover decides to attend the festival.

== Cast ==
- Bruce Willis as Dwayne Hoover
- Albert Finney as Kilgore Trout
- Nick Nolte as Harry LeSabre
- Barbara Hershey as Celia Hoover
- Glenne Headly as Francine Pefko
- Lukas Haas as George "Bunny" Hoover
- Omar Epps as Wayne Hoobler
- Vicki Lewis as Grace LeSabre
- Buck Henry as Fred T. Barry
- Ken Campbell as Eliot Rosewater / Gilbert
- Jake Johanssen as Bill Bailey
- Will Patton as Moe the truck driver
- Chip Zien as Andy Wojeckowzski
- Owen Wilson as Monte Rapid
- Alison Eastwood as Maria Maritimo
- Shawnee Smith as Bonnie McMahon
- Michael Jai White as Howell
- Michael Clarke Duncan as Eli
- Kurt Vonnegut, Jr. as Commercial director
- Doug Maughan (voice) as TV/radio announcer (uncredited)

== Production ==
Lukas Haas makes a cameo as Bunny, Dwayne's son, who, in the novel, plays piano in the lounge at the Holiday Inn. For legal reasons, in the film Bunny instead plays at the Best Western Inn.

The film's soundtrack predominantly features the exotica recordings of Martin Denny to tie in with Hoover's Hawaiian-based sales promotion.

Much of the film was shot in and around Twin Falls, Idaho. Vonnegut makes a one-line cameo as a TV commercial director.

== Reception ==
=== Box office ===
The film made $178,278 against a budget of $12 million.

=== Critical response ===
Breakfast of Champions was not well received, scoring a rating of 28% on Rotten Tomatoes based on 50 reviews, with an average score of 4.6/10. The consensus states: "The movie is overwhelmed by its chaotic visual effects and disjointed storyline." Metacritic, which uses a weighted average, assigned the film a score of 42 out of 100, based on 17 critics, indicating "mixed or average" reviews.

In his review for The New York Times, Stephen Holden wrote "In many ways, Breakfast of Champions is an incoherent mess. But it never compromises its zany vision of the country as a demented junkyard wonderland in which we are all strangers groping for a hand to guide us through the looking glass into an unsullied tropical paradise of eternal bliss." Entertainment Weekly gave the film an "F" rating and Owen Gleiberman wrote, "Rudolph, in an act of insane folly, seems to think that what matters is the story. The result could almost be his version of a Robert Altman disaster — a movie so unhinged it practically dares you not to hate it."

In his review for the San Francisco Chronicle, Peter Stack wrote "Rudolph botches the material big time. Relying on lame visual gimmicks that fall flat, and insisting on pushing almost every scene as frantic comedy weighted by social commentary, he forces his actors to become hams rather than believable characters." Sight and Sound magazine's Edward Lawrenson wrote "Willis' performance, all madness, no method, soon feels embarrassingly indulgent." In his review for the Los Angeles Times, Kevin Thomas wrote "As it is, Breakfast of Champions is too in-your-face, too heavily satirical in its look, and its ideas not as fresh as they should be. For the film to have grabbed us from the start, Rudolph needed to make a sharper differentiation between the everyday world his people live in and the vivid world of their tormented imaginations."

In her review for The Village Voice, Amy Taubin wrote "Another middle-aged male-crisis opus, it begins on a note of total migraine-inducing hysteria, which continues unabated throughout." The French filmmaker and critic Luc Moullet, on the other hand, regarded it as one of the great films of the 1990s.

== Vonnegut's reaction ==
At the close of the Harper audiobook edition of Breakfast of Champions, there is a brief conversation between Vonnegut and his long-time friend and attorney Donald C. Farber, in which the two, among making jokes, disparage this loose film adaptation of the book as "painful to watch."

== See also ==
- Cross-dressing in film and television
