= Mandela (1996 film) =

1996 film

- DVD cover
- Directed by: Angus Gibson; Jo Menell
- Written by: Bo Widerberg Researcher Michele Rowe
- Produced by: Jonathan Demme; Jo Menell; Edward Saxon
- Cinematography: Dewald Aukema; Peter Tischhauser
- Edited by: Andy Keir
- Music by: Hugh Masekela; Cédric Gradus Samson
- Production companies: Clinica Estetico; Island Pictures
- Distributed by: Island Pictures
- Release date: October 11, 1996
- Running time: 118 minutes
- Countries: South Africa; United States
- Language: English

Mandela (also called Mandela: Son of Africa, Father of a Nation) is a 1996 documentary film directed by Angus Gibson and Jo Menell. It was nominated for an Academy Award for Best Documentary Feature.

== Synopsis ==
The documentary is the official film biography of Nelson Mandela, the first democratically elected president of the ethnically united South Africa. The film touches on Nelson Mandela's childhood, family, education, and his long struggle to gain freedom for all the various ethnic groups in South Africa, including his experiences on the Robben Island prison.

== Interviews ==
- F.W. de Klerk
- Nelson Mandela
- Winnie Mandela
- Eugene Terre'Blanche, (Afrikaner Weerstandsbeweging Party)

== Reception ==
Film critic Roger Ebert, writing for the Chicago Sun-Times, liked the film but felt more information should have been included, especially the motivations of F.W. de Klerk. He wrote, "The actual story of the events leading to the election is more complicated and interesting. Yes, South Africa suffered from economic sanctions. But it could have survived for many years before caving in; it forged clandestine trading arrangements with countries ranging from China to Israel, and its diamonds still found their way onto the fingers of brides all over the world. Civil unrest was widespread, but South Africa had a fearsome array of police and military forces to counter it. If white South Africa had been adamant, apartheid would still be law...None of those events are told in Mandela, which simplifies the transfer of power into a fable of black against white; it all but implies that de Klerk was unwilling to see power change hands."

Critics Frederic and Mary Ann Brussat liked the film and wrote, "Directors Jo Menell and Angus Gibson give us an up-close and personal portrait of this black hero...This inspiring and edifying screen biography celebrates Mandela as a freedom fighter and a liberator — the father of a nation."

== Awards ==
Wins

- International Documentary Association: Pare Lorentz Award, Jonathan Demme, Jo Menell and Edward Saxon; 1997.
- San Francisco International Film Festival: Silver Spire, Film & Video - Biography, Jo Menell and Angus Gibson; 1997.

Nominations

- Academy Awards: Oscar; Best Documentary: Best Documentary, Features, Jo Menell and Angus Gibson; 1997.
