= Love at Large =

1990 film by Alan Rudolph

- Theatrical release poster
- Directed by: Alan Rudolph
- Written by: Alan Rudolph
- Produced by: Stuart M. Besser; David Blocker; Dana Mayer
- Starring: Tom Berenger; Elizabeth Perkins; Anne Archer; Kate Capshaw; Annette O'Toole; Ted Levine; Ann Magnuson
- Cinematography: Elliot Davis
- Edited by: Lisa Zeno Churgin
- Music by: Mark Isham
- Distributed by: Orion Pictures
- Release date: March 9, 1990
- Running time: 97 minutes
- Country: United States
- Language: English
- Box office: $1.4 million

Love at Large is a 1990 American romance and mystery crime film directed by Alan Rudolph and starring Tom Berenger, Elizabeth Perkins and Anne Archer.

== Plot ==
Set in a present that feels more like the past, awkward Harry Dobbs is an inept private detective surrounded by mysterious and dangerous dames. Among them is his angry girlfriend, Doris, and the suspicious women he encounters on his latest case.

In a nightclub, the sultry Miss Dolan hires the private eye to follow her lover, Rick, who might be trying to kill her. The trail takes Harry to women like Mrs. King and Mrs. McGraw, who apparently are wed to the same man.

A female investigator named Stella Wynkowski turns up. Harry teams up with her, never entirely certain whether she is friend or foe. But the trouble really starts when Harry realizes that he is following the wrong guy and then finds out that he is being followed himself.

== Cast ==
- Tom Berenger as Harry Dobbs
- Elizabeth Perkins as Stella Wynkowski
- Anne Archer as Miss Dolan
- Kate Capshaw as Mrs. Ellen McGraw
- Annette O'Toole as Mrs. King
- Ted Levine as Frederick King / James McGraw
- Ann Magnuson as Doris
- Kevin J. O'Connor as Art the Farmhand
- Ruby Dee as Corrine Dart
- Barry Miller as Marty
- Neil Young as Rick
- Meegan Lee Ochs as Bellhop
- Gailard Sartain as Taxi Driver
- Robert Gould as Tavern Bartender
- Dirk Blocker as Hiram Culver, Used-Car Salesman

== Production ==
Rudolph said the story came from two inspirations - a film about a female private eye he had written but could not get financed, and a story he had heard about a man with two families.

Rudolph called it "my attempt to make a film for a popular audience. It was made for the only good studio—Orion—and it was put together in like a week. The only comment one of the studio people made was, “Can you put a murder in?” And I said, “No, this is a murder mystery without a murder.” That didn’t ring a bell for them, but that’s what it was intended to be. There’s no hiding that it was influenced by several noir comedies. It’s more like The Thin Man…"

Rudolph later said the film was only made because it had Tom Berenger in it. Tom Berenger called his character "a combination of Inspector Clouseau, Charlie Chan, Humphrey Bogart and John Garfield (with a deep, deep voice)." Rudolph said "a lot of that film's edges were rounded off, not because they [Orion] imposed things on me but because I was trying to be a good guy about it."

Filming took place in Bend and Portland, Oregon.

== Reception ==
Rudolph said the film "barely got released and nobody cared about the movie... I knew it didn't have the edge to cut through anything and that people really wouldn't see it as the romantic piece that it was, because they dont care about movies like that. I was still pleased with it."
