= Benjamin Pennypacker House =

Historic house in Pennsylvania, United States

- U.S. National Register of Historic Places
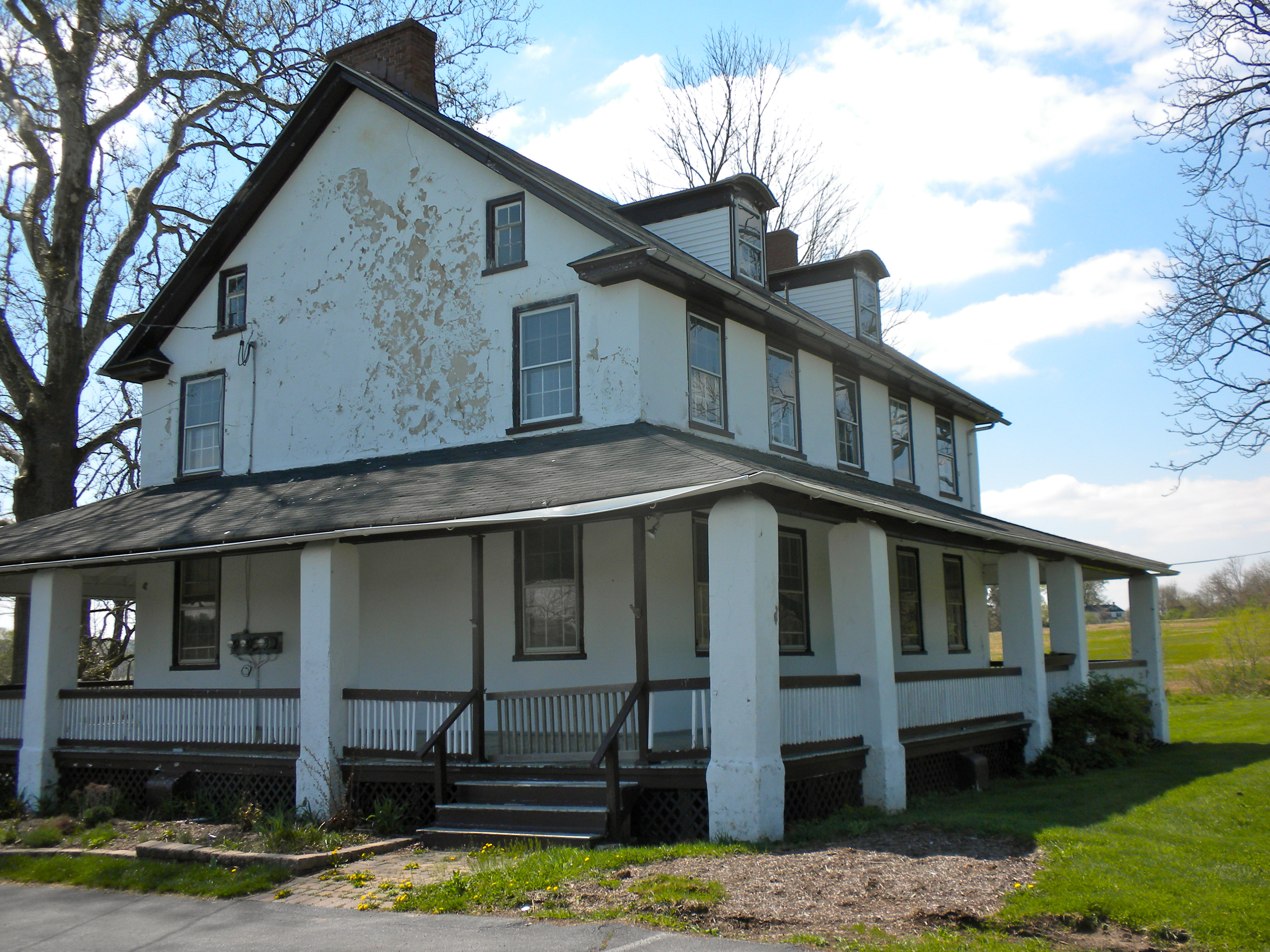
- Benjamin Pennypacker House, April 2010

- Location within Pennsylvania Location within the United States
- Location: 800 E. Swedesford Rd., West Whiteland Township, Pennsylvania
- Coordinates: 40°2′27″N 75°36′14″W
- Area: 1.7 acres (0.69 ha)
- Architectural style: Federal
- MPS: West Whiteland Township MRA
- NRHP reference No.: 84003298
- Added to NRHP: August 2, 1984

Benjamin Pennypacker House is a historic home located in West Whiteland Township, Chester County, Pennsylvania. It was built in the 1840s and is a 2 1/2-story, stuccoed stone dwelling with a gable roof in the rural Federal style. It features a one-story, three-sided porch. Also on the property is a contributing corn crib and site of a spring house. The property was acquired by the Church Farm School about 1918, and served as the residence for the farm manager.

It was listed on the National Register of Historic Places in 1984.
