= Church Farm School =

School in Exton, Pennsylvania, US

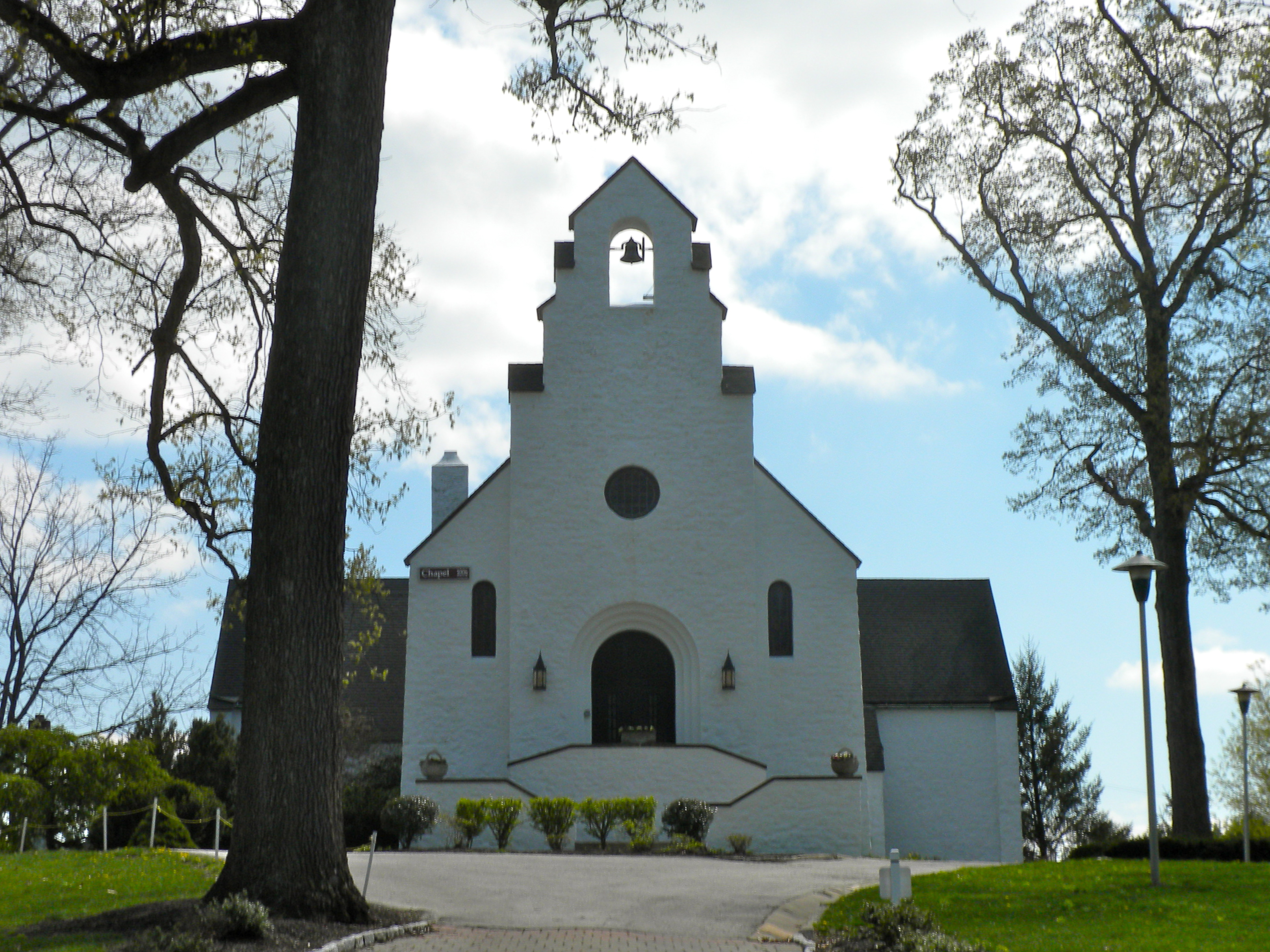

Location
- 1001 East Lincoln Highway; Exton, PA 19341-2818; United States

Information
- School type: Independent boarding & day high school
- Religious affiliation: Christianity
- Denomination: Episcopal
- Established: 1918
- Founder: Charles Shreiner
- NCES School ID: A1903685
- Headmaster: Dr. Troy M. Baker
- Faculty: 26.3 (on an FTE basis)
- Grades: 9–12
- Gender: All-male
- Enrollment: 171 (2019-2020)
  - Grade 9: 39
  - Grade 10: 44
  - Grade 11: 43
  - Grade 12: 45
- Average class size: 12
- Student to teacher ratio: 1:6.5
- Hours in school day: 7
- Campus size: 250 acres (100 ha)
- Campus type: Suburban
- Colors: Maroon and Grey
- Athletics conference: PIAA District 1, Bicentennial Athletic League
- Nickname: Griffins
- Accreditations: NAES, NAIS, TABS
- Newspaper: Greystock News
- Yearbook: CFS Griffin
- Endowment: $120-150 Million
- Annual tuition: $48,000
- Website: www.gocfs.net

The Church Farm School (CFS) is a private secondary Christian school in Exton, Pennsylvania, United States. In 1985, the campus was listed as a historic district by the National Register of Historic Places.

== History ==
The school was founded in 1918 by Charles Shreiner. Shreiner, an Episcopal clergyman, established the school in Glen Loch (now Exton) Pennsylvania, on Route 30 (Lincoln Highway), as a boarding school for boys from single-parent homes, primarily those without fathers. The sons of the clergy, members of the armed services, and police officers were a second focus of the school in its early days. Shreiner, because of his strict belief in the importance of discipline and a strong work ethic, was known to the boys as the "Colonel."

Shortly after its founding, the school acquired the Benjamin Pennypacker House property. The school integrated in 1963. After Shreiner died in 1964, the Board of Directors placed the school under the direction of his son, Charles Shreiner, Jr., a World War II veteran who served until retirement in 1987. The school's third headmaster, Charles "Terry" Shreiner III, the founder's grandson, led the school from 1987 until his retirement in 2009. Interim headmaster, Thomas Rodd, Jr., led the school before Edmund K. Sherrill II, an Episcopal clergyman, became headmaster in July 2009.

Over the first half of its history, the school's campus grew to 1700 acres, on which it operated a large farm with student labor. Each boy was required to work half of each school day and full-time for half of each summer. This enterprise included a large dairy farm and hog raising operation and produced many crops. The school gradually phased out agricultural activities, beginning in the mid-1970s, selling off most of the remaining farmland to developers by the late 1990s. The dairy barns and silos remain as a memorial of the agricultural era of the school's history.

== Notable alumni ==
- Jon Bradshaw, journalist
- Micheal Eric, Nigerian basketball player
- Jón Axel Guðmundsson, Icelandic basketball player
