= Premonition (1972 film) =

- Theatrical release poster
- Directed by: Alan Rudolph
- Written by: Alan Rudolph
- Produced by: Oscar Rudolph
- Starring: Carl Crow; Tim Ray; Winfrey Hester Hill
- Cinematography: John Bailey
- Edited by: Richard Patterson
- Music by: Tom Akers; Alex Del Zoppo; Tim Ray
- Production company: Joyce Productions
- Distributed by: Transvue Pictures Corp.
- Release date: November 1972
- Running time: 83 minutes
- Country: United States
- Language: English
- Budget: $25,000 or $32,000

Premonition (also known as Head or The Impure) is a 1972 horror film written and directed by Alan Rudolph. The film was Rudolph's first after being an assistant director of 11 episodes of the 1960s sitcom The Brady Bunch, as well as the films The Big Bounce (1969) and Riot (1969). Originally titled Head, the distributors first changed the title to Premonition and later for a time to Impure.

== Plot ==
Neil, a musician, recalls events that happened three years earlier. He was acting as a guide in the desert for anthropologist Professor Kilkenny, who finds an old skeleton. This prompts a vision which the Professor dismisses as drug related because Neil smoked a red poppy.

Neil and two other musicians, Baker and Andy, form a group and go live in a cabin. They see the red poppy nearby. Andy and Neil start having nightmares.

Andy goes into the forest at night accompanied by Neil. Andy has a premonition of death and dies. Neil goes insane.

== Cast ==
- Carl Crow as Neil
- Tim Ray as Andy
- Winfrey Hester Hill as Baker
- Victor Izay as Kilrenny
- Cheryl Adams as Susan
- Tom Akers as RGM
- Lee Alpert as Brother
- Barry Brown as Mike

== Production ==
Rudolph based the film on a local rock group Sweetwater. He raised $25,000 from various people and made a film over ten days. "The challenge of translating this small amount into a finished movie overwhelmed my interests in the story," he recalled. Cast member Tim Ray was son of director Nicholas Ray. Part of the film was shot in the studios of Robert Aldrich who was a friend of Rudolph's father.

== Reception ==
Rudolph later recalled, "My guess is that it wasn’t ambiguous enough. I believe the last time I saw Premonition was after it was done and I drove the only print to Arizona where it was second-billed at a drive-in for one weekend only. I remember watching it from my car being intrigued by the ending and cringing at everything else. I was hooked and humbled by the whole experience; encouraged that I knew enough to make a film and depressed I didn’t know what to put in it."

Shock Cinema wrote "Like so many young filmmakers of his era, his [Rudolph's] first feature as writer-director was an overwrought mess packed with tacky hallucinations, amateur performances and tripped-out. self-important melodrama... I'm usually a pretty easy mark for dippy, counterculture claptrap, but this crude, self-important, 79-minute bummer bored the bejesus out of me. The acting reeks, the production values are threadbare, it’s loaded with irritating sound effects, and (with the exception of low-key Baker) you’ll want to mow down all of these annoying characters with a speeding Buick, It’s hard to believe that anyone involved in this cinematic sludge went onto an actual career in film."

== See also ==
- List of American films of 1972
