= Trixie (film) =

- Official DVD Cover
- Directed by: Alan Rudolph
- Written by: John Binder; Alan Rudolph
- Produced by: Robert Altman
- Starring: Emily Watson; Dermot Mulroney; Nick Nolte; Nathan Lane; Brittany Murphy; Lesley Ann Warren; Will Patton
- Cinematography: Jan Kiesser
- Edited by: John Helde; Michael Ruscio
- Music by: Mark Isham; Roger Neill
- Production companies: Pandora Cinema; Sandcastle 5 Productions
- Distributed by: Sony Pictures Classics
- Release date: June 28, 2000
- Running time: 116 minutes
- Country: United States
- Language: English
- Budget: $10 million
- Box office: $295,683

Trixie is a 2000 American mystery-crime-comedy film directed by Alan Rudolph and starring Emily Watson, Nick Nolte, Will Patton and Brittany Murphy.

== Plot ==
Trixie Zurbo is an eccentric woman who longs to quit her job as a security guard in a department store and become a private detective. She finally gets her wish when she takes a job in security at a casino. She accidentally becomes involved in a murderous plot and Trixie takes her first case; however, her unschooled command of the English language (malapropism) and comedy intervenes and the mess begins.

== Cast ==
- Emily Watson as Trixie Zurbo
- Dermot Mulroney as Dex Lang
- Nick Nolte as Senator Drummond Avery
- Nathan Lane as Kirk Stans
- Brittany Murphy as Ruby Pearli
- Lesley Ann Warren as Dawn Sloane
- Will Patton as W. 'Red' Rafferty
- Stephen Lang as Jacob Slotnick
- Mark Acheson as Vince Deflore
- Vincent Gale as Sid Deflore
- Jason Schombing as Ramon
- Robert Moloney as Alvin
- Troy Yorke as Cleavon Arris
- Wendy Noel as Coffee Shop Waitress
- David Kopp as Bell Boy
- Ken Kirzinger as Avery's Bodyguard
- Jonathon Young as Gas Attendant
- Terry Chen as Waiter
- Gary Jones as Lobbyist
- Zak Santiago Alam as Gang Member
- Tyler Labine as Gang Member
- Alvin Sanders as Capitol Building Custodian
- Peter Bryant as Cop #1
- Kate Robbins as Tourist Wife
- Michael Puttonen as Tourist
- Brendan Fletcher as CD Thief
- Terence Kelly as Mr. Lang
- Maria Herrera as security guard

== Production ==
The film was originally meant to star Anne Heche.

Filming took place over the summer of 1999.

The script uses a style of dialog using word play (malapropism) similar to the Marx Brothers, Gracie Allen, and the film Airplane!.

== Release ==
The film premiered on June 28, 2000 in New York City and Los Angeles, California. The film was distributed by Sony Pictures Classics and received a limited theatrical release in the United States.

=== Box office ===
Despite an ensemble cast that included Nick Nolte, Will Patton, and Brittany Murphy, the film garnered negative reviews from critics and modest box office returns, earning approximately $295,683 domestically.

Following its theatrical run, Trixie was released on DVD on December 5, 2000, providing wider access to audiences and contributing to a minor cult following, particularly among fans of unconventional detective narratives.

=== Critical ===
Filmink praised the "Strong cast, with Murphy, Nolte and Nathan Lane stealing the show."

== Reception ==
On Rotten Tomatoes, the film holds an approval rating of 27%, based on 48 reviews. The website's critical consensus states "Boring and predictable script; not funny." On Metacritic, the film has a weighted average score of 26 out of 100, based on 28 critics, indicating "generally unfavorable reviews".

Roger Ebert wrote "Trixie has all the trappings and suits of woe of a comedy, but then it changes horses of a different color and turns into a thriller in the middle of the stream. That razes our expectations. It’s not a success, but it’s a closed mist, and kind of fun in its own ways and means. I should warn you, however, that if you are not amused by cheerfully mangled language, you may think too much Trixie is not a treat."

Jonathan Rosenbaum wrote "Watson holds the screen, and she and Rudolph’s mise en scène supply most of what makes this movie watchable."

Variety called it "a minor, rather trivial film that reflects the director's whimsical wish to revisit the popular genres of noir and screwball, but which lacks distinctive humor or a fresh contempo take. "

"The movie follows the fortunes of a doltish security guard, named Trixie (a disastrously miscast Emily Watson)" - New York Post

"…the screenplay...makes the mistake of basing much of its humor on Trixie's continual verbal stumbling, and the joke is quickly beaten to death" - The New York Times

"…that estimable actress Emily Watson probably breaks the all-time records for malapropisms and mixed metaphors…" - Chicago Tribune

"the eponymous Trixie (Emily Watson) who has, in fact, only one trick: the malapropism (or rather, verbal confusions that are supposed to be malapropisms)." - James Bowman

"When Trixie takes a job as house dick at a cheapo casino in a rundown Great Lakes resort town, we’ve moved decisively into Rudolph’s home territory and we know what’s coming: a cast of lovable oddballs!" - salon.com
