= The Moderns =

1988 film by Alan Rudolph

- Theatrical release poster by Keith Carradine
- Directed by: Alan Rudolph
- Written by: Jon Bradshaw; Alan Rudolph
- Produced by: David Blocker; Shep Gordon; Carolyn Pfeiffer
- Starring: Keith Carradine; Linda Fiorentino; Geneviève Bujold; Geraldine Chaplin; Wallace Shawn; Kevin J. O'Connor; John Lone
- Cinematography: Toyomichi Kurita
- Music by: Mark Isham; Charlélie Couture
- Production company: Nelson Entertainment
- Distributed by: Alive Films
- Release date: April 15, 1988
- Running time: 126 minutes
- Country: United States
- Language: English
- Budget: $3.5 million
- Box office: $2,011,497

The Moderns is a 1988 film by Alan Rudolph, which takes place in 1926 Paris during the period of the Lost Generation and at the height of modernist literature. The film stars Keith Carradine, Linda Fiorentino, John Lone, and Geneviève Bujold among others.

== Plot ==
Nick Hart (Keith Carradine) is an expatriate American artist living in Paris among some of the noted artists and writers of the time, including Ernest Hemingway (Kevin J. O'Connor), Gertrude Stein (Elsa Raven), and Alice B. Toklas (Ali Giron). Nick is torn between his ex-wife Rachel (Linda Fiorentino) and Nathalie de Ville (Geraldine Chaplin), who hires him to forge her paintings. He must also contend with Rachel's current husband, Bertram Stone (John Lone), who does not know that his wife is still married to another man.

== Cast ==
- Keith Carradine as Nick Hart
- Linda Fiorentino as Rachel Stone
- John Lone as Bertram Stone
- Wallace Shawn as Oiseau
- Geneviève Bujold as Libby Valentin
- Geraldine Chaplin as Nathalie de Ville
- Kevin J. O'Connor as Ernest Hemingway
- Charlélie Couture as L'Evidence (credited as Charlelie Couture)
- Elsa Raven as Gertrude Stein
- Ali Giron as Alice B. Tokias
- Gailard Sartain as New York Critic
- Robert Gould as "Blackie"
- Antonia Dauphin as Babette
- Véronique Bellegarde as Laurette (credited as Veronique Bellegarde)
- Isabel Serra as Armand
- Brooke Smith as Abigail
- Marthe Turgeon as Rose Selavy
- Timothy Webber as Stone's Business Associate
- Mance Edmond as "Coco"
- Normand Brathwaite as Butler Laloux
- Michael Rudder as Buffy, Group Montparno
- Paul Buissonneau as Alexandre, Group Montparno
- Lenie Scoffié as Femme de Lettres, Group Montparno (credited as Lenie Scofie)
- Reynald Bouchard as Chapelle, Group Montparno
- Flora Balzano as Pia Delarue, Group Montparno
- Beverly Murray as Eve, Group Montparno
- Renée Lee as Chanteuse, Group Montparno (credited as Renee Lee)
- Stephanie Biddle as Fille de Nuit

== Production ==
Meg Tilly was set to play the part of Rachel Stone, but withdrew due to scheduling conflicts. Linda Fiorentino eventually signed on to replace her. Mick Jagger and Sam Shepard were considered to play Bertram Stone, before John Lone was cast. Isabella Rossellini screen-tested for the role of Nathalie de Ville, but lost to Geraldine Chaplin.

The film was originally planned to be shot in 1977, and it was set to be produced by Alive Enterprises, but the film was stuck in development hell, and it was not properly filmed until 1987.

== Reception ==
The film received fairly positive reviews from critics, and it holds an 81% rating on Rotten Tomatoes based on 21 reviews. It was nominated for three Independent Spirit Awards, including Best Supporting Male for John Lone, Best Screenplay, and Best Cinematography.

American film critic Roger Ebert stated in his review of The Moderns:

"sort of a source study for the Paris of Ernest Hemingway in the 1920s; it's a movie about the raw material he shaped into The Sun Also Rises and A Moveable Feast, and it also includes raw material for books by Gertrude Stein, Malcolm Cowley and Clifford Irving."
