= Jon Bradshaw =

American writer (1938–1986)

- Born: 1938; New York City, New York, U.S.
- Died: 25 November 1986 (aged 47–48); Los Angeles, California, U.S.
- Education: Columbia University
- Alma mater: Church Farm School
- Occupation: journalist
- Spouse: Carolyn Pfeiffer

Jon Bradshaw (1938 – November 25, 1986) was a journalist, author, and contributing editor to Esquire.

== Biography ==
Jon Wayne Bradshaw was born in New York City and graduated from Church Farm School. He also attended Columbia University.

He wrote for the New York Herald Tribune early in his career. In 1963, he moved to England and wrote for Queen, British Vogue, and The Sunday Times. In 1974, he published Backgammon: The Cruelest Game (Random House).

In 1975, he moved back to the United States to join the staff of New York magazine, having been recruited by the magazine's founder, Clay Felker. Also in 1975, Bradshaw published his book Fast Company: How Six Master Gamblers Constantly Defy the Odds and Always Come Out Winners for HarperCollins. Fast Company was republished in 1987 (Vintage Books) and again in 2003 (High Stakes).

In 1985, he published the biography Dreams that Money Can Buy: The Tragic Life of Libby Holman about the famous 1920s Broadway actress and recording star who was present for the notorious and officially unsolved death of her husband, Zachary Smith Reynolds.

Bradshaw died of a heart attack at the University of California at Los Angeles Medical Center on November 25, 1986, at age 48.

Bradshaw was famous for his lifestyle and journalism, and many of his works were compiled in a 2021 anthology The Ocean Is Closed: Journalistic Adventures and Investigations and published by Ze Books. He was also in a relationship with Anna Wintour before marrying producer Carolyn Pfeiffer. He has two children. A daughter Shannon Bradshaw and a son photographer Rick Guest. Bradshaw was called the "Indiana Jones of magazine journalism" by Esquire editor Alex Belth.

== Works ==
- Bradshaw, Jon; Cooke, Barclay (1974). Backgammon: The Cruelest Game. Random House. ISBN 0394488121.
- Fast Company: How Six Master Gamblers Defy the Odds - and Always Win. High Stakes. 2003. ISBN 978-1-84344-013-0. (first published 1975)
- Dreams that Money Can Buy: The Tragic Life of Libby Holman. W. Morrow. 1985. ISBN 978-0-688-01158-1.
- The Ocean Is Closed: Journalistic Adventures and Investigations. ZE Books. 2021. ISBN 978-1-7335401-4-8.
