= David Blocker =

American film producer (born 1955)

David Blocker (born May 4, 1955) is an American film producer. He is the son of actor Dan Blocker, and the older brother of actor Dirk Blocker. In 1998, he won an Emmy for producing Don King: Only in America.

== Filmography ==
He was a producer in all films unless otherwise noted.

=== Film ===
Year	Film	Credit
1984	Choose Me	
1985	Trouble in Mind	
1987	Made in Heaven	
1988	The Moderns	
1990	Love at Large	
1992	Equinox	
1993	Blink	
1997	Traveller	
1999	Breakfast of Champions	
2001	15 Minutes	
2001	Frailty	
2002	Dark Blue	
2005	The Greatest Game Ever Played	
2007	Into the Wild	Executive producer
2009	Hannah Montana: The Movie	Executive producer

Music department

Year	Film	Role
1985	Trouble in Mind	Soundtrack executive producer
1988	The Moderns	Soundtrack executive producer
1992	Equinox	Soundtrack producer
1993	Blink	Producer of tracks performed by the Drovers for the film and its soundtrack release
1999	Breakfast of Champions	Music producer: Bunny Hoover sessions

Production manager

Year	Film	Role
1990	Love at Large	Unit production manager
2001	Frailty	Unit production manager
2002	Dark Blue	Unit production manager
2005	The Greatest Game Ever Played	Unit production manager
2009	Hannah Montana: The Movie	Unit production manager

As an actor

Year	Film	Role
2017	Ray Meets Helen	Atmosphere

Second unit director or assistant director

Year	Film	Role
1980	Delusion	First assistant director
1993	Blink	Second unit director

Sound department

Year	Film	Role	Notes
1978	The Greatest Battle	Boom operator: US unit	Uncredited

Thanks

Year	Film	Role
1988	Miracle Mile	Thanks

=== Television ===
Year	Title	Credit	Notes
1995	Tyson		Television film
1997	Don King: Only in America		Television film
2016−17	The Shannara Chronicles	Co-executive producer Executive producer	
2020	The Wilds	Co-executive producer	

As an actor

Year	Title	Role
1993	Kung Fu: The Legend Continues	Callahan
