= Songwriter (film) =

1984 film by Alan Rudolph

- Theatrical release poster
- Directed by: Alan Rudolph
- Written by: Bud Shrake
- Produced by: Sydney Pollack
- Starring: Willie Nelson; Kris Kristofferson; Lesley Ann Warren; Rip Torn; Melinda Dillon
- Cinematography: Matthew Leonetti
- Edited by: Stuart Pappé
- Music by: Larry Cansler; Willie Nelson (songs); Kris Kristofferson (songs)
- Distributed by: Tri-Star Pictures
- Release date: October 12, 1984
- Running time: 94 minutes
- Country: United States
- Language: English
- Budget: $8.6 million
- Box office: $865,915

Songwriter is a 1984 American satirical comedy-drama film directed by Alan Rudolph. At the 57th Academy Awards, it received an Oscar nomination for Best Original Song Score and Its Adaptation or Adaptation Score for Kris Kristofferson.

The film's plot involves an artist seeking his freedom. The material is loosely based on Willie Nelson's own life and legend and finances. His song "Night Life", for example, which he sold in 1961 for $150, went on to be recorded by over 70 artists and sold more than 30 million copies.

== Plot ==
Doc Jenkins is a country and western composer, who employs devious tricks to extricate himself from his legal entanglement with a Nashville gangster entrepreneur who takes all the profits from his songs.

Fed up with life touring and making no money from recordings of his music, Doc has turned to managing the career of his old singing partner Blackie Buck. Doc takes a further client - a woman singer, Gilda. He wants to get back with his ex-wife Honey, and to get solid ground beneath his feet again.

== Cast ==
- Willie Nelson as "Doc" Jenkins
- Kris Kristofferson as "Blackie" Buck
- Lesley Ann Warren as Gilda
- Rip Torn as Dino McLeish
- Melinda Dillon as "Honey" Carder
- Mickey Raphael as Arly
- Richard C. Sarafian as Rocky "Rodeo Rocky"
- Shannon Wilcox as Anita
- Jeff MacKay as Hogan
- Gailard Sartain as Mulreaux
- Kristin Renfro as Daughter #2

== Production ==
The film came out of conversations the writer Bud Shrake had with Willie Nelson. A script was written which Shrake said "it’s been described as a surreal version of the Willie’s life story, which it sorta is, but it’s sorta like my life story too, and everybody else’s who’s tried to make a living in show business.” It was originally envisioned the film would star Nelson and Waylon Jennings.

The project was set up at Warner Bros but then Nelson decided to make Honeysuckle Rose (1980) which was a box office disappointment. This delayed filming. The project was reactivated when Kris Kristofferson agreed to co-star, and Sydney Pollack came on board as producer. Pollack had directed Nelson in The Electric Horseman and produced Honeysuckle Rose; it was Kristofferson's first movie appearance since the twin flops of Heaven's Gate and Rollover.

The film was originally directed by Steve Rash, best known for The Buddy Holly Story. Filming started on 18 October 1983 in Austin Texas. Two weeks into the shoot Rash was fired after conflicts with Pollack.

The movie was offered to Alan Rudolph who called it "a directing job that everyone was turning down, the kind of situation Kristofferson might say was ‘enough to kill a normal man.’" However he did it in order to pay for the rights to use some songs he wanted for Choose Me. Filming resumed four days later, with the delay causing a reported $1.5 million to be added to the budget.

== Reception ==
=== Critical ===
The film is reviewed, favorably, by the critic Pauline Kael in her collection of movie reviews, Hooked. "Playing a vain, laid-back sensualist, the silver bearded Kristofferson has a smiling glow; he has never been more at ease; Rip Torn is the picture's insurance against gentility. Everything he says sounds mean and dirty, and even when you can't understand his snarled out words he makes you laugh. Rhonda Dotson has something of Teri Garr's manic alertness and dippiness, too, but in a softer form. She's a romantic comedienne with awesome poise. Richard C. Sarafian has a whomping comic menace. Lesley Ann Warren's Gilda is spectacular. When we first see Gilda, she's a singer with no belief in herself and no class; she's an incredibly beautiful girl in a red dress [but] when Doc grooms her to go out as the opening act for Blackie, she begins to learn something about taste and musicianship, and her voice flowers. Besides being one of the great beauties of the screen, Warren can sing." Roger Ebert gave the film 3 1/2 out of a possible 4 stars, and says ""Songwriter" is one of those movies that grows on you. It doesn't have a big point to prove, and it isn't all locked into the requirements of its plot. It's about spending some time with some country musicians who are not much crazier than most country musicians, and are probably nicer than some. It also has a lot of good music."

Filmink called it "a ramshackle, enjoyable vehicle with some great acting (especially Lesley Ann Warren) and a fun ending."

On the review aggregator website Rotten Tomatoes, 89% of 9 critics' reviews are positive, with an average rating of 7/10.

Shrake later said "I’m happy with the way Songwriter came out. When I first saw the beginning of it, I thought it was too choppy, but the second time I liked the beginning. I’ve seen it now probably 10 times, and I like it better every time."

=== Box office ===
The film was a box office disappointment. However it developed a cult reputation.
