= Return Engagement (1983 film) =

- Theatrical release poster
- Directed by: Alan Rudolph
- Produced by: David Blocker; Barbara Leary; Carolyn Pfeiffer
- Starring: Timothy Leary; G. Gordon Liddy
- Cinematography: Jan Kiesser
- Edited by: Tom Walls
- Music by: Adrian Belew
- Production company: Island Pictures
- Distributed by: Island Alive
- Release date: November 23, 1983 (United States)
- Running time: 90 minutes
- Country: United States
- Language: English

Return Engagement is a 1983 American documentary film about the debate tour between Timothy Leary and G. Gordon Liddy. It was directed by Alan Rudolph.

== Cast ==
Actor	Role
Carole Hemingway	Moderator
Timothy Leary	Himself
G. Gordon Liddy	Himself
Clara Sturak	Herself (uncredited)
