= Welcome to L.A. =

1976 film by Alan Rudolph

- Poster
- Directed by: Alan Rudolph
- Written by: Alan Rudolph
- Produced by: Robert Altman; Scott Bushnell; Robert Eggenweiler
- Starring: Keith Carradine; Geraldine Chaplin; Sally Kellerman; Harvey Keitel; Lauren Hutton; Viveca Lindfors; Sissy Spacek; Denver Pyle; John Considine; Richard Baskin
- Cinematography: David Myers
- Edited by: William A. Sawyer; Tom Walls
- Music by: Richard Baskin
- Production company: Lion's Gate Films
- Distributed by: United Artists
- Release dates: November 12, 1976 (Seattle); March 10, 1977 (New York City)
- Running time: 103 minutes
- Country: United States
- Language: English
- Budget: $1.1 million or $900,000
- Box office: $4-to-$5 million

Welcome to L.A. is a 1976 American drama musical romance film directed by Alan Rudolph and starring Keith Carradine and an ensemble cast. The film focuses on themes of romantic despair and shallowness in the decadent upper class during the 1970s, illustrated through a La Ronde-like circle of sexual adventures and failed affairs revolving around a womanizing songwriter, his businessman father, and their associates. It was produced by Robert Altman.

Rudolph called it "a street opera... with songs as stories. Personally, the film celebrates Altman’s great influence on me. I was proud of that influence and I wanted it known, I wasn’t hiding it. Being in the shadow of a great director was a privilege, not insecurity. My voice and fingerprints were my own, perhaps too much for many people while some strongly approved of the film, some strongly didn’t."

He also declared Welcome to LA was "one of the first true American independent films of the current era. It defined today’s movement, what the so-called independent label implies...Here was an American dramatic film with known actors playing in art houses and competing for national space with studio pictures. That wasn’t done then, not out of Hollywood."

== Plot ==
Celebrity musician Eric Wood plans to record an album of songs written by Carroll Barber, who has been living in England. Carroll's aging manager Susan Moore brings Carroll to Los Angeles for the recording sessions, and rents him a house from real estate agent Ann Goode. Ann is unhappily married to furniture store owner Jack Goode, who is pursuing their young housemaid, Linda Murray. Linda in turn wants a relationship with her friend Kenneth "Ken" Hood, a married young executive.

Susan expects Carroll to resume a past affair they had, but he rejects her and instead has sex with Ann when she shows him his house. Ann tries unsuccessfully to continue the affair by dropping in on Carroll at home and bringing Linda over to clean. However, Carroll shows himself to be a womanizer, seemingly incapable of connecting with anyone. He visits his wealthy father Carl, whom he has not seen in three years. Carl, with the help of Ken Hood, has built the small Barber family dairy into a major business. Carroll ends up having affairs with receptionist Jeannette and his father's photographer mistress Nona.

Ken works long hours at the Barber business and neglects his wife, Karen, a housewife and mother who is obsessed with taxi rides and the Greta Garbo film Camille. While Carroll is drinking and driving through the city, he randomly meets Karen and is drawn to her. He takes her to his home but when he tries to romance her, she reveals she is married (though not to whom) and departs. She later leaves him her telephone number, but refuses to take his repeated calls. Linda, who has moved into Carroll's spare room, invites Ken to visit her there, where he meets Ann.

Just before Christmas, Ken is thrilled to learn that Carl has made him partner in the business, but Karen is not happy that he will be spending even more time at work. On Christmas Eve, Ken gets drunk and calls Ann, but their date ends badly as Ken cannot stop thinking of his wife. Meanwhile, Jack and Linda spend the evening together, which also ends badly when Linda asks Jack for money. Jack and Ann, both disappointed, return home and have sex with each other.

An angry Susan reveals to Carroll that Eric does not like his songs, and that she and Carroll's father bribed Eric to record the album in order to get Carroll to come to Los Angeles. Susan and Carl each hoped to build their separate relationships with Carroll, only to be thwarted by his lack of response. Karen, the only person who seems to have truly piqued Carroll's interest, finally appears at his home, but just as they are about to have sex, Ken telephones, upset and looking for his wife. Upon realizing that Karen is Ken's wife and seems primarily interested in her husband, Carroll leaves while Karen and Ken are reconciling on the phone, just as Linda arrives home. Linda, eavesdropping, hears the voice of Ken, her own crush, on the phone, saying the same things to Karen about relationships that he earlier said to Linda. Linda furtively disconnects the phone, then tries to bond with Karen, who imitates Garbo in Camille. Carroll goes to the recording studio and discovers that Eric Wood has decided not to finish the album.

== Cast ==
- Keith Carradine as Carroll Barber
- Sally Kellerman as Ann Goode
- Geraldine Chaplin as Karen Hood
- Harvey Keitel as Ken Hood
- Lauren Hutton as Nona Bruce
- Sissy Spacek as Linda Murray
- Viveca Lindfors as Susan Moore
- Denver Pyle as Carl Barber
- John Considine as Jack Goode
- Richard Baskin as Eric Wood
- Allan F. Nicholls as Dana Howard
- Cedric Scott as Faye
- Mike E. Kaplan as Russell Linden
- Diahnne Abbott as Jeannette Ross

== Production ==
Rudolph had worked with Robert Altman on several films as an assistant director and writer. During the making of Nashville Rudolph met composer Richard Baskin. Baskin had written a suite of nine songs under the title "City of the One Night Stands" and Rudolph thought he could make a film based on them. He wrote what became Welcome to LA. Rudolph called it "a story about solitude in a city that fosters solitude." In another interview he called the film "emotional science fiction. It's about people who got what they wanted and now have to figure out what to do with it."

Robert Altman liked the script and arranged finance from United Artists who were backing Buffalo Bill, which Altman had written with Rudolph. Rudolph recalled, "we promised the financers to deliver a name cast for a budget below a million dollars."

Rudolph said "Actors swirled around Altman’s world on a daily basis and filling roles was more through osmosis than formal casting. The process for me became one of deciding on a first choice and going after that person exclusively." Many of the actors had worked with Rudolph before.

Filming started December 1975 and took thirty days.

== Release ==
United Artists did not want to distribute the film so Altman did it himself. "They were very nice about it," said Rudolph. "They really said 'We don't think we can handle this film'." Mike Kaplan handed the release.

Rudolph recalled "The first day it opened in Los Angeles, people were picketing the movie. First public screening of my life. "This movie is vile, vile, vile..." with the "viles" getting smaller and smaller."

== Reception ==
=== Box office ===
According to Rudolph, the film returned its costs.

=== Critical ===
Welcome to L.A was widely panned as an empty, vacuous, pretentious film with the music by Richard Baskin deemed especially grating. The New York Times critic Richard Eder wrote: "The songs are a particular torment. The music whines, the lyrics complain, and Mr. Carradine sings them with a kind of hushed writhing, like a worm dying at the bottom of a barrel."

John Simon called Welcome to L.A. a dumb and corrupt film. TimeOut said the film was interesting in retrospect but that "it lacks both the inspirational spontaneity of his producer and mentor Altman's best work, and the warmth of his own later films".

One of the few critics to support the film at the time was Jack Kroll of Newsweek who described the film as an "extraordinary debut" for Rudolph, continuing that the director "does a remarkable job of weaving this gallery of neurotics into a vivid pattern of sharp, distilled performances." Kroll also considered Rudolph's work with Robert Altman, "he's gone beyond even Altman's example in shaping a film from a total design concept." Furthermore, he praised Rudolph for creating a "Los Angeles that's shimmering Xanadu of psychic uncertainty. Mirrors reassemble people into soulless human collages. The swoosh of Hutton's ever-present Nikon sounds like a little guillotine beheading reality. The quavering cadences of Baskin's music evoke both the sweetness and self-indulgence of Carroll Barber. Cinematographer Dave Myers works like the new realist painters, capturing a metropolis of burnished surfaces that seems to dissolve the will in an amber nullity of light."

The Turner Classic Movies (TCM) capsule review warns, "The music score by Richard Baskin may affect your viewing pleasure."

Geraldine Chaplin was nominated for a British Academy Film Award for Best Supporting Actress.

It has also been cited as an example of hyperlink cinema.

The film was not a large box office success but was highly regarded and led to Ridley Scott hiring Harvey Keitel and Keith Carradine in The Duellists.

== Home media ==
It was first released on DVD October 26, 2011.

Kino Lorber released the film on Blu-ray December 1, 2015.

== See also ==
- New Hollywood
- 1976 in film

== Notes ==
- Falsetto, Mario (1999). Personal visions : conversations with independent film-makers. London: Constable.
