= Equinox (1992 film) =

Film directed by Alan Rudolph

- Movie Poster
- Directed by: Alan Rudolph
- Written by: Alan Rudolph
- Produced by: David Blocker
- Starring: Matthew Modine; Lara Flynn Boyle; Tyra Ferrell; Marisa Tomei; Tate Donovan; Kevin J. O'Connor; Lori Singer; Gailard Sartain; M. Emmet Walsh; Fred Ward
- Cinematography: Elliot Davis
- Edited by: Michael Ruscio
- Music by: Terje Rypdal
- Production company: RainCity Productions
- Distributed by: I.R.S. Media
- Release dates: September 1992 (Cinéfest); September 18, 1992 (TIFF); October 1992 (Chicago); June 11, 1993 (U.S.)
- Running time: 110 minutes
- Country: United States
- Language: English
- Box office: $279,627

Equinox is a 1992 film written and directed by Alan Rudolph. It stars Matthew Modine in dual roles, along with Lara Flynn Boyle, Marisa Tomei and Fred Ward. The film was shot in Minnesota and Utah and is set in the fictional city of Empire. It was nominated for four Independent Spirit Awards.

== Plot ==
Henry Petosa and Freddy Ace are identical twins living in the fictional city of Empire with no knowledge of each other, separated at birth and placed for adoption.

Henry is a very funny and strong garage mechanic. He lives in a slum and loves Beverly Franks, his best friend's sister. He also baby-sits for his neighbor Rosie, a prostitute.

Freddy is a driver for Mr. Paris, a gangster. He is slick and self-confident, married to a materialistic woman named Sharon.

One day, a young woman named Sonya Kirk who works in a morgue accidentally comes across a letter indicating that the twins are actually the offspring of European nobility and owed a large sum of inheritance money. Sonya decides to play amateur detective and track them down.

It all leads to a confrontation between the surprised twins in a restaurant, a shootout and a final scene high above the Grand Canyon.

== Principal cast ==
Actor	Role
Matthew Modine	Henry Petosa / Freddy Ace
Lara Flynn Boyle	Beverly Franks
Fred Ward	Mr. Paris
Tyra Ferrell	Sonya Kirk
Marisa Tomei	Rosie Rivers
Kevin J. O'Connor	Russell Franks
Tate Donovan	Richie Nunn
Lori Singer	Sharon Ace
Gailard Sartain	Dandridge
M. Emmet Walsh	Pete Petosa

Twin child actors Jasen and Jereme Kane play the young version of Modine's characters, as well as appearing as the twin children in the restaurant at the end of the film.

== Production ==
Parts of the film were shot in Crescent Junction and Moab, Utah as well as St. Paul and Minneapolis, Minnesota.

== Critical reception ==
The New York Times movie reviewer Stephen Holden had praise for the actors, saying Modine "does a fine job of differentiating between the two without resorting to caricature. He is especially good at showing how the repressed qualities of each twin peek through their surfaces. As Henry's sweetheart, Ms. Boyle exudes the right mixture of warm-blooded ardor and strait-laced defensiveness."
