= Alan Rudolph =

American film director and screenwriter

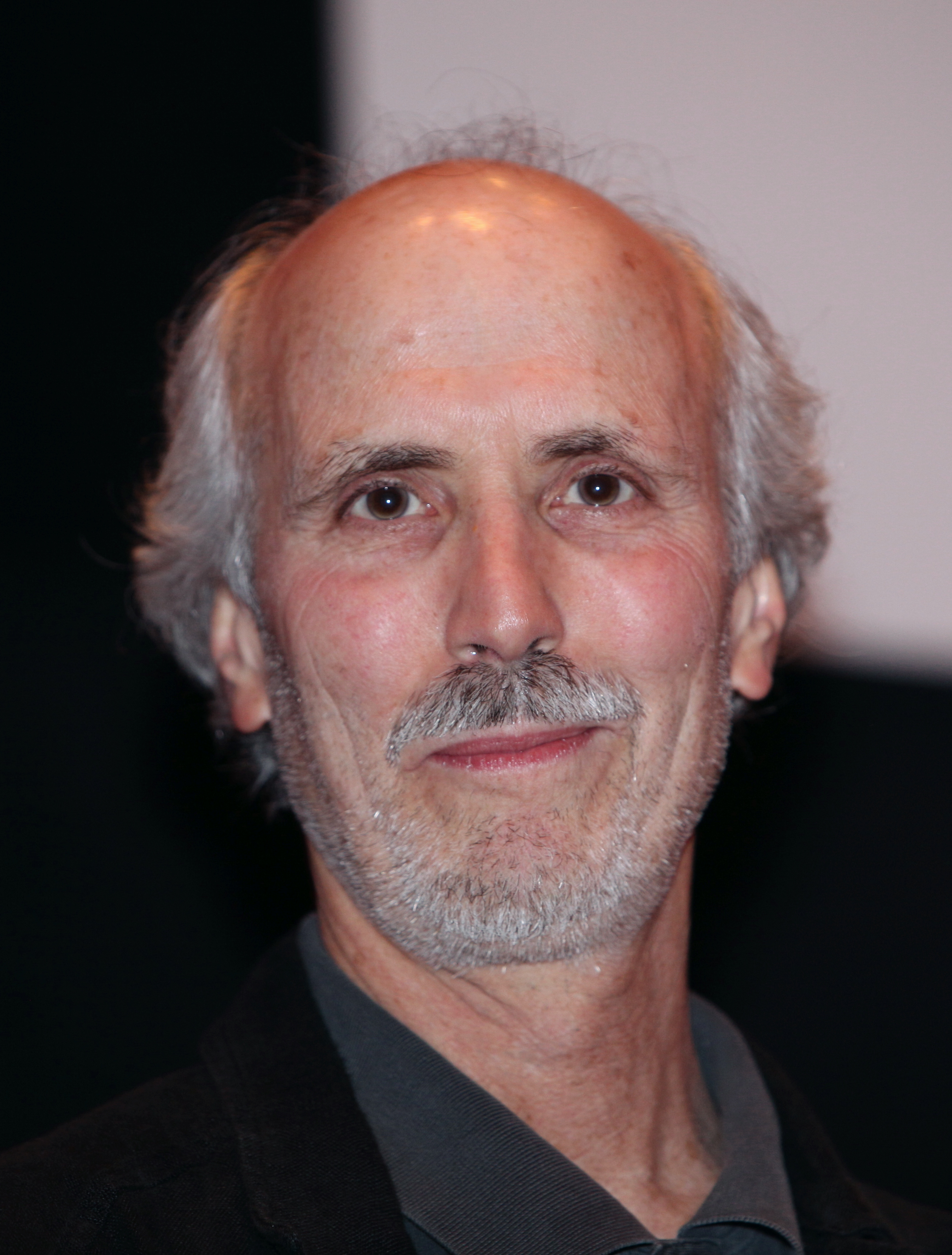
- Rudolph in 2009
- Born: December 18, 1943 (age 82); Los Angeles, California, U.S.
- Occupations: Film director, screenwriter
- Years active: 1972–present
- Style: Comedy-drama; Satire; Erotic thriller; Erotic comedy-drama; Noir; Thriller

Alan Steven Rudolph (born December 18, 1943) is an American film director and screenwriter. He began his career as an assistant director and became a protégé of filmmaker Robert Altman. Rudolph later established himself as an independent director, making films that frequently explore romantic relationships, emotional isolation and unconventional characters. His best-known works include Choose Me (1984), Trouble in Mind (1985), The Moderns (1988), Mrs. Parker and the Vicious Circle (1994), and Afterglow (1997).

== Early life ==
Rudolph was born in Los Angeles, California, the son of Oscar Rudolph (1911–1991), a television director and actor, and his wife. His father had worked as an actor and assistant director before developing a career in television, directing episodes of series including The Brady Bunch.

Rudolph grew up with considerable exposure to the film industry. In an interview with The Guardian, he recalled visiting Hollywood soundstages with his father and becoming fascinated by the artificial environments created for film and television. He also experimented with filmmaking using a small camera during his youth.

Before becoming a director, Rudolph worked in several production positions. His early credits included assistant directing work on The Big Bounce (1969), The Traveling Executioner (1970) and Star Spangled Girl (1971).

== Career ==
=== Early films and collaboration with Robert Altman ===
He became interested in film and was a protégé of director Robert Altman. Rudolph worked as an assistant director on Altman's film adaptation of Raymond Chandler's The Long Goodbye (1973), as well as California Split (1974) and Nashville (1975).

Altman's approach to filmmaking had a lasting influence on Rudolph. He was particularly interested in the use of ensemble casts, overlapping dialogue and stories in which relationships between characters were given as much importance as conventional plot developments.

Rudolph also worked with Altman as a screenwriter, collaborating on Buffalo Bill and the Indians, or Sitting Bull's History Lesson (1976), a satirical Western starring Paul Newman.

Before joining Altman's production team, Rudolph had directed two low-budget horror films, Premonition (1972) and Terror Circus (1973). The latter was also released under the titles Barn of the Naked Dead and Nightmare Circus. His early work included elements of the unconventional visual style that would become more prominent in his later films.

In 1976, Rudolph directed Welcome to L.A., produced by Altman and starring Keith Carradine. The film follows a group of interconnected characters in Los Angeles, using their romantic and professional relationships to develop an ensemble narrative.

The production brought together several collaborators Rudolph had met during his work on Nashville, including Carradine and musician Richard Baskin. The film established several of Rudolph's recurring interests, particularly romantic longing, emotional isolation and the use of music to link different characters.

Rudolph continued with Remember My Name (1978), starring Geraldine Chaplin as a woman who returns to the life of her former husband after being released from prison. The film drew upon conventions of film noir while exploring obsession and the relationship between memory and identity.

=== Independent films and critical recognition ===
Rudolph's films focus upon isolated and eccentric characters and their relationships, and frequently are ensemble pieces featuring prominent romanticism and fantasy. He has written most of his films. In addition, he has repeatedly worked with actors Keith Carradine and Geneviève Bujold, and composer Mark Isham (see list of film director and composer collaborations).

Following Remember My Name, Rudolph directed the musical comedy Roadie (1980), starring Meat Loaf, and the science-fiction thriller Endangered Species (1982). He also made Return Engagement (1983), a documentary featuring Timothy Leary and G. Gordon Liddy.

Director Rudolph came to prominence with Choose Me (1984), the story of the sexual relationships among a handful of lonely, but charming, people – an ex-prostitute bar owner (Lesley Ann Warren), an emotionally repressed radio talk show hostess (Bujold), and a disarmingly honest man played by Carradine.

The film combines romantic comedy with an unconventional narrative structure and places particular emphasis on the characters' emotional uncertainties. Writing in Senses of Cinema, film scholar Steven Rybin examined the role of artistic expression and romantic identity in the film, themes that he identified throughout Rudolph's work.

In the same year, Rudolph directed Songwriter, starring Willie Nelson and Kris Kristofferson, a musical drama about two country musicians negotiating the demands of the recording industry.

Trouble in Mind (1985) featured Kris Kristofferson as well as Bujold, Carradine and Divine, in a rare performance outside female drag.

The film combines romantic drama with elements of film noir and takes place in a fictional city called Rain City. The stylised setting and unusual combination of characters reinforced Rudolph's reputation for developing unconventional interpretations of familiar genres.

The film was entered into the 36th Berlin International Film Festival.

=== Made in Heaven and The Moderns ===
In 1987, Rudolph directed Made in Heaven, a romantic fantasy starring Timothy Hutton and Kelly McGillis. The screenplay was written by Bruce A. Evans and Raynold Gideon.

The film tells the story of a young man who dies and falls in love in heaven with a woman who has yet to be born. He is subsequently allowed to return to Earth in an attempt to find her. The film combines romantic comedy with themes of fate, memory and personal identity.

The Moderns (1988) is a fictional love story set in 1926 Paris among well-known American expatriates such as Ernest Hemingway and F. Scott Fitzgerald, whom the film's characters briefly encounter.

An expatriate American artist played by Carradine re-ignites his love for his former wife, played by Linda Fiorentino, despite her marriage to a sinister art collector played by John Lone.

The film also explores the relationship between artistic originality and commercial value. According to Rybin's analysis in Senses of Cinema, its use of art forgery reflects a recurring concern in Rudolph's films with the distinction between appearances and reality.

=== Films of the 1990s ===
In 1990, Rudolph wrote and directed the private-eye love story Love at Large, filmed in Portland, Oregon.

After the thriller Mortal Thoughts (1991), starring Demi Moore, he directed Equinox (1992), with Matthew Modine playing a pair of twins separated at birth. The film is also listed under 1993 in some filmographies, including the American Film Institute's catalog.

His Mrs. Parker and the Vicious Circle (1994) was a biographical film about Dorothy Parker, with Jennifer Jason Leigh in the title role.

The film portrays the writers, critics and performers associated with New York's Algonquin Round Table. Through Parker's life and relationships, it explores the connections between artistic ambition, professional recognition and personal disappointment.

In 1997, Rudolph directed Afterglow, starring Julie Christie, Nick Nolte, Lara Flynn Boyle and Jonny Lee Miller. The film follows two married couples whose relationships become increasingly complicated through chance encounters and affairs.

Christie's performance earned her a nomination for the Academy Award for Best Actress at the 70th Academy Awards in 1998.

Breakfast of Champions (1999) was an adaptation of Kurt Vonnegut's metafictional novel, with Albert Finney as the prolific but underappreciated writer Kilgore Trout. The film also starred Bruce Willis and Nick Nolte.

The film was entered into the 49th Berlin International Film Festival.

The film received largely negative reviews upon its original release. Rudolph later discussed its development in interviews surrounding a restoration and rerelease of the film in 2024. He explained that he had first adapted the novel for Robert Altman during the 1970s, long before directing the project himself.

=== Later career ===
Rudolph continued directing with Trixie (2000), a crime comedy starring Emily Watson, and Investigating Sex (2001), also released under the title Intimate Affairs.

He subsequently directed The Secret Lives of Dentists, adapted from Jane Smiley's novella The Age of Grief. The film stars Campbell Scott and Hope Davis as married dentists whose relationship comes under strain. It is associated with festival screenings in 2002 and a theatrical release in 2003.

Rudolph has also turned to painting, and in April 2008 he presented a solo exhibition of his paintings at Gallery Fraga, Bainbridge Island, Washington. In an interview with The Guardian, he described painting as a means of continuing his artistic work during a period when he was unable to secure financing for new films.

In 2017, he directed Ray Meets Helen, a love story between two unusual outsiders, portrayed by longtime collaborator Keith Carradine and Sondra Locke, in her final film role. The film received a limited theatrical release in May 2018.

Rudolph described the production as an opportunity to return to independent filmmaking on a modest budget. In interviews, he explained that his approach was to create a fable-like narrative rather than a realistic account of everyday life.

== Style and themes ==
Rudolph's filmmaking is often characterised by an interest in emotionally isolated characters, unconventional romances and narratives in which several characters' lives intersect. His films regularly draw upon familiar genres, including romantic comedy, drama, fantasy and film noir, while departing from their conventional structures.

His work has frequently been compared with that of Robert Altman, particularly for its use of ensemble casts and its emphasis on atmosphere and relationships. Rudolph has nevertheless developed a distinctive approach to romantic storytelling, focusing on uncertainty, longing and the ways in which people construct identities for themselves.

Music plays an important role throughout his films. Rudolph has repeatedly worked with composer Mark Isham, and in an interview with Film Comment discussed the influence of jazz on his filmmaking. He described music as an integral part of the emotional experience of a film, rather than simply an accompaniment to the action.

Visual art is another recurring subject. In The Moderns, questions of authenticity and forgery are central to the story, while films such as Choose Me and Trouble in Mind use paintings, sculptures and other artistic objects to reflect aspects of their characters' personal lives.

Rudolph has also maintained long-term working relationships with performers including Keith Carradine and Geneviève Bujold. In 2018, Rudolph and Carradine reflected on their collaboration in a filmed conversation published by Notebook, the film publication of MUBI.

== Filmography ==
Year	Title	Director	Writer	Producer
1972	Premonition	Yes	Yes	Yes
1973	Terror Circus (Note: Credited as "Gerald Cormier".)	Yes	Story	Yes
1975	Welcome to My Nightmare	No	Yes	No
1976	Buffalo Bill and the Indians, or Sitting Bull's History Lesson	No	Yes	No
1976	Welcome to L.A.	Yes	Yes	No
1978	Remember My Name	Yes	Yes	No
1980	Roadie	Yes	Story	No
1982	Endangered Species	Yes	Yes	No
1983	Return Engagement	Yes	No	No
1984	Choose Me	Yes	Yes	No
1984	Songwriter	Yes	No	No
1985	Trouble in Mind	Yes	Yes	No
1987	Made in Heaven	Yes	No	No
1988	The Moderns	Yes	Yes	No
1990	Love at Large	Yes	Yes	No
1991	Mortal Thoughts	Yes	No	No
1992	Equinox	Yes	Yes	No
1994	Mrs. Parker and the Vicious Circle	Yes	Yes	No
1997	Afterglow	Yes	Yes	No
1999	Breakfast of Champions	Yes	Yes	No
2000	Trixie	Yes	Yes	No
2001	Investigating Sex	Yes	Yes	Yes
2002	The Secret Lives of Dentists	Yes	No	No
2017	Ray Meets Helen	Yes	Yes	No

== Personal life ==
He married Joyce, a photographer and artist.

A couple of years after 1985's Trouble in Mind, Rudolph bought a house on Bainbridge Island.
