= Trouble in Mind (film) =

1985 film by Alan Rudolph

- Theatrical release poster
- Directed by: Alan Rudolph
- Written by: Alan Rudolph
- Produced by: David Blocker
- Starring: Kris Kristofferson; Keith Carradine; Lori Singer; Geneviève Bujold; Joe Morton; George Kirby; Divine
- Cinematography: Toyomichi Kurita
- Edited by: Tom Walls
- Music by: Mark Isham
- Distributed by: Alive Films
- Release date: December 11, 1985
- Running time: 111 minutes
- Country: United States
- Language: English
- Budget: $3 million
- Box office: $19,632

Trouble in Mind is a 1985 American neo-noir film written and directed by Alan Rudolph and starring Kris Kristofferson, Keith Carradine, Geneviève Bujold, and Lori Singer, with an out-of-drag appearance by Divine. The story follows an ex-cop just released from jail after serving time for a murder sentence as he returns to the mean streets of the fictional "Rain City", inspired by and filmed in Seattle.

== Plot ==
In the mysterious metropolis of Rain City, a former policeman, Hawk, is out of prison after serving eight years on a murder rap. He returns to his former hangout, Wanda's Cafe, run by his former love, Wanda.

New arrivals in town are the down on his luck Coop, his naive wife Georgia and their baby boy, Spike. In desperate need of money, Coop goes to work for a gangster, Solo, but he isn't very good at his job.

Hawk, meanwhile, begins to develop a protective and even romantic attachment to Georgia, who is hired by Wanda to be a waitress. Coop runs afoul of the mob boss in town, Hilly Blue, leading to a wild shootout at Hilly's unique mansion.

== Cast ==
- Kris Kristofferson as John "Hawks" Hawkins
- Keith Carradine as "Coop" Cooper
- Lori Singer as Georgia
- Geneviève Bujold as Wanda
- Joe Morton as "Solo"
- Divine as Hilly Blue
- George Kirby as Lieutenant Gunther
- John Considine as Nate Nathanson
- Dirk Blocker as "Rambo"
- Albert Hall as Leo
- Gailard Sartain as Adolph "Fat Adolph"
- Robert Gould as Mardy Stoog

== Production ==
"Rain City" was filmed at Seattle locations, largely older areas on the edges of downtown, giving an impression of a less modern city.

The music, performed by Marianne Faithfull, was arranged and accompanied by Mark Isham. The film begins with the 1920s blues standard "Trouble in Mind" and ends with a song of love and reassurance, both performed by Faithfull.

Peter R. Tromp (now Peter Trump, author of Milk the Children and Poems and Portions) provided music as Divine's strolling violinist. In the Chinatown restaurant scene, Tromp performed Pachelbel's Canon in D and J.S. Bach's Brandenburg Concerto No. 3. During scenes filmed at the Seattle Art Museum, Tromp performed Telemann's Fantasia No. 6, "Autumn" from Vivaldi's Four Seasons, Mozart's Eine kleine Nachtmusik, Biber's Passacaglia, and Reveille. Tromp's appearance and music in Trouble in Mind were uncredited.

== Release ==
Trouble in Mind was entered into the 36th Berlin International Film Festival.

Shout! Factory released a 25th anniversary DVD of the film on December 14, 2010.

== Reception ==
The film has received generally positive reviews, and holds an 81% "fresh" rating on Rotten Tomatoes, based on 16 reviews.

Film critic Roger Ebert gave the film four stars in his review, noting Rudolph's combination of style and emotional sincerity that is aware of being funny. He describes it as a "movie that takes place within our memories of the movies." Ebert later named it #7 on his list of the best movies of 1986. Walter Goodman of The New York Times was less enthusiastic; he wrote that Rudolph "seems to be striving to say something but isn’t able to break through the fog of the script."

In his book Rainer on Film, critic Peter Rainer included Trouble in Mind in a section on underseen films.
