= 32nd Independent Spirit Awards =

US film awards ceremony in 2017

- Awarded for: Best in independent film
- Date: February 25, 2017
- Site: Santa Monica Pier; Santa Monica, California, U.S.
- Hosted by: Nick Kroll; John Mulaney

Highlights
- Best Feature: Moonlight
- Most awards: Moonlight (6) (5 plus Robert Altman Award)
- Most nominations: American Honey (6)

Television coverage
- Channel: IFC

The 32nd Film Independent Spirit Awards, honoring the best independent films of 2016, were presented by Film Independent on February 25, 2017. The nominations were announced on November 22, 2016. The ceremony was hosted by Nick Kroll and John Mulaney, and broadcast live on IFC. Online streaming service Sundance Now live-streamed the ceremony concurrently with the telecast with an on-demand version available on Sundance Now.

== Winners and nominees ==
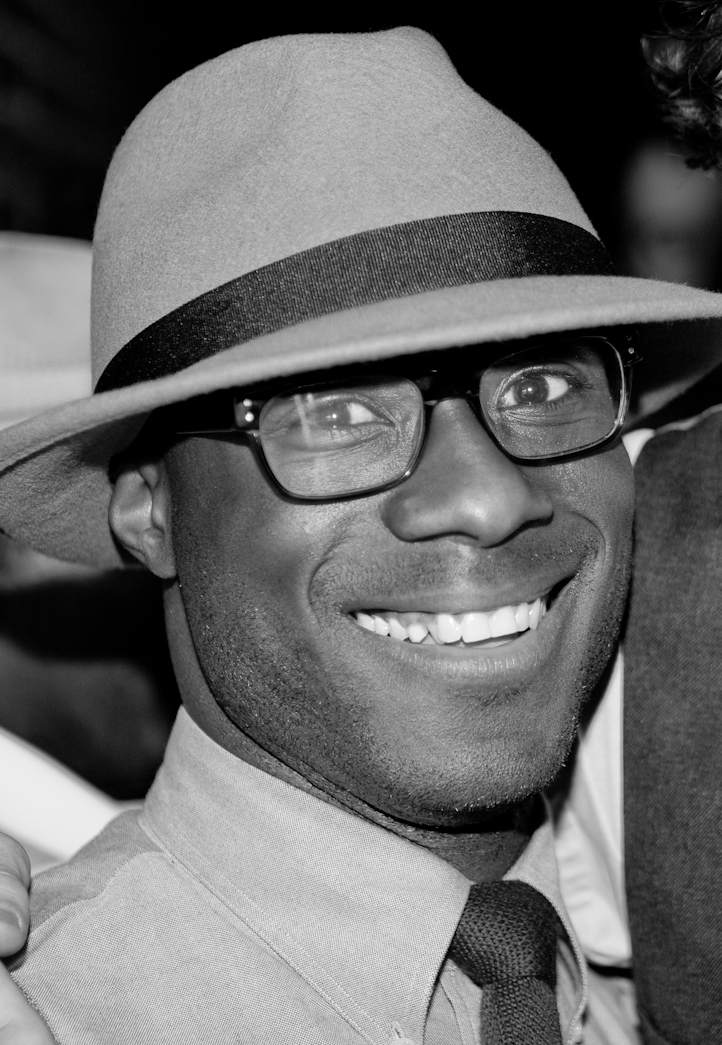
Barry Jenkins, Best Director winner and Best Screenplay co-winner

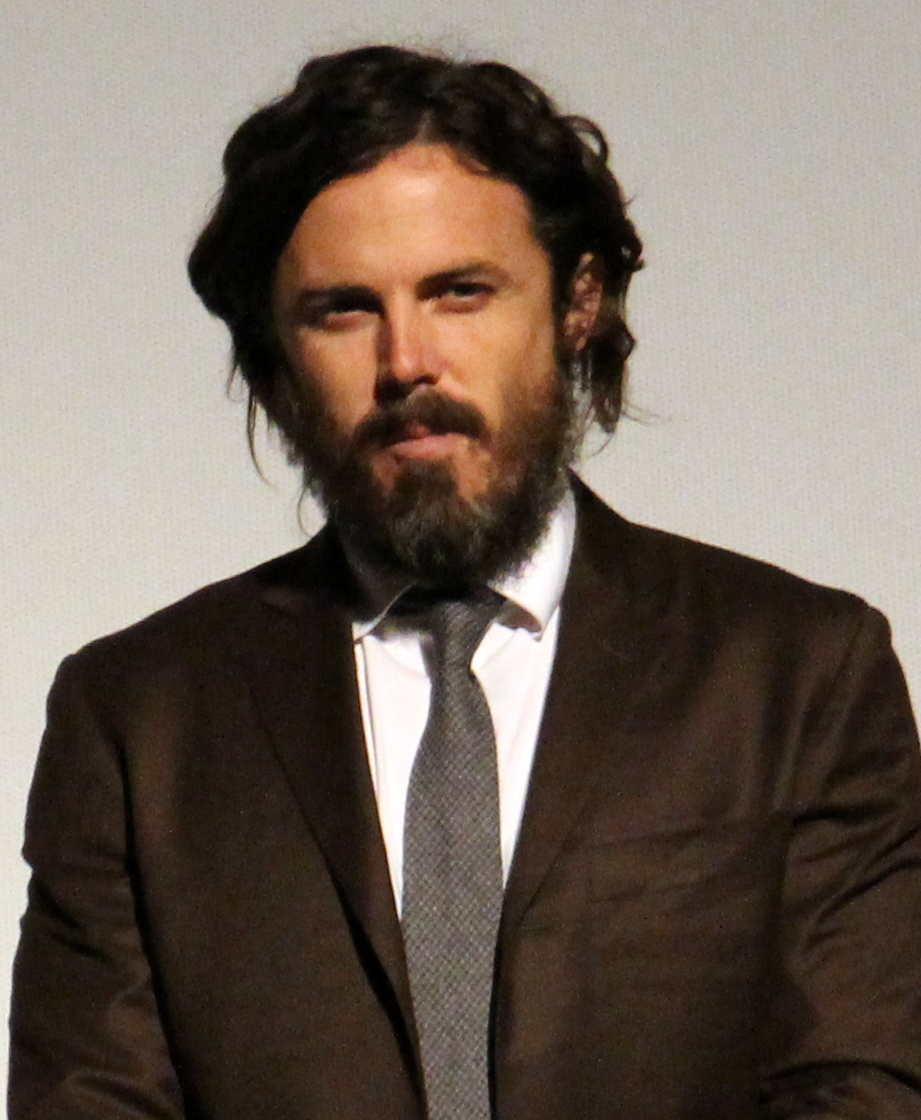
Casey Affleck, Best Male Lead winner

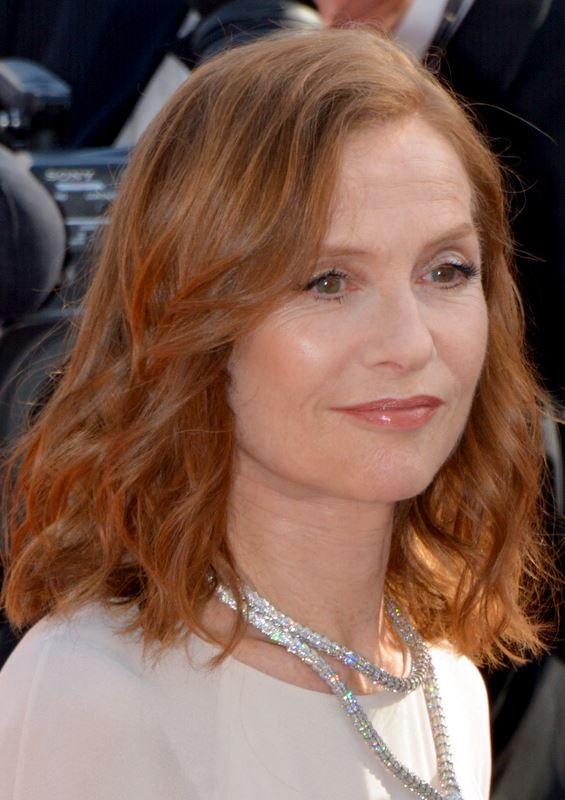
Isabelle Huppert, Best Female Lead winner

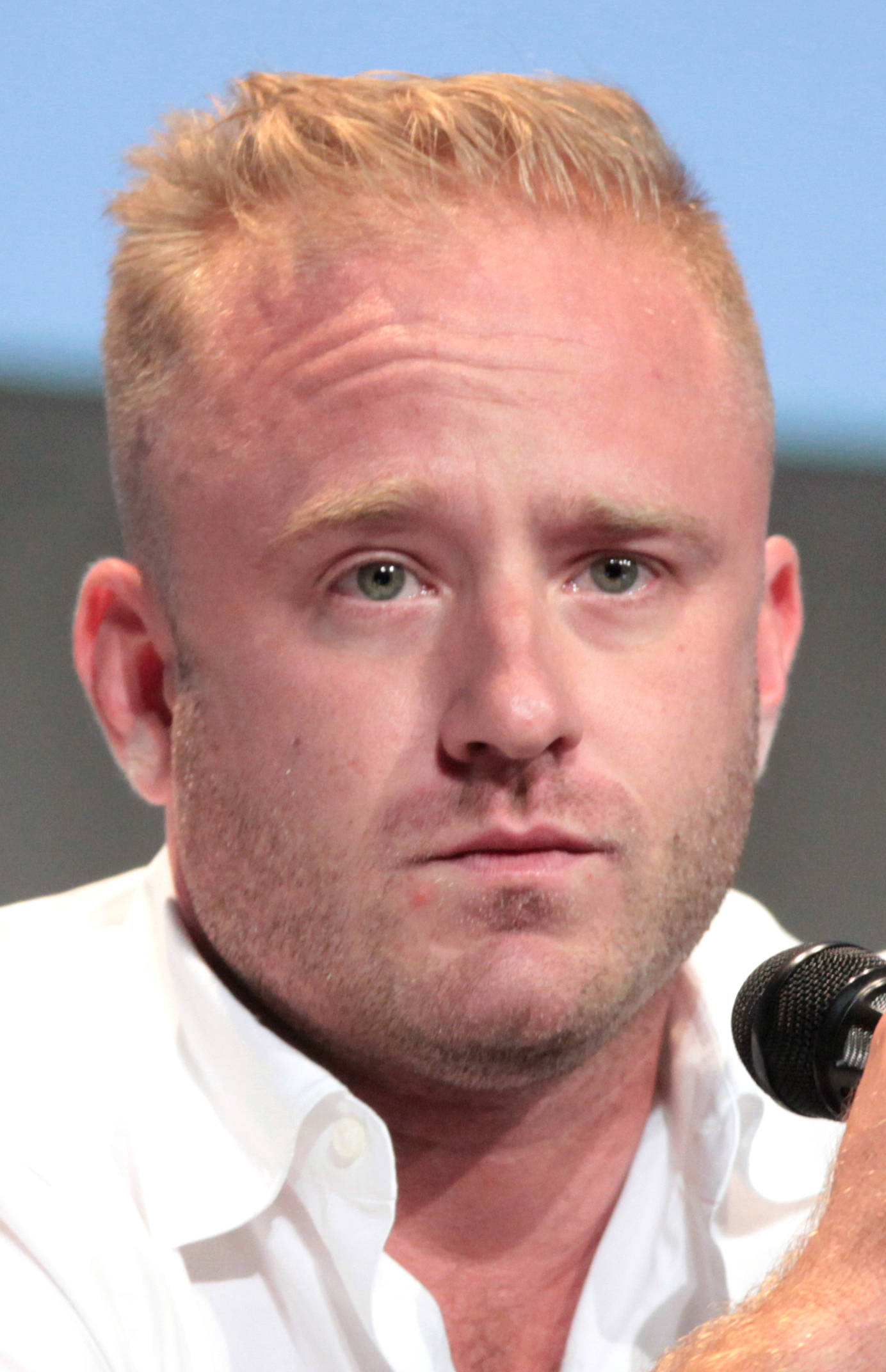
Ben Foster, Best Supporting Male winner

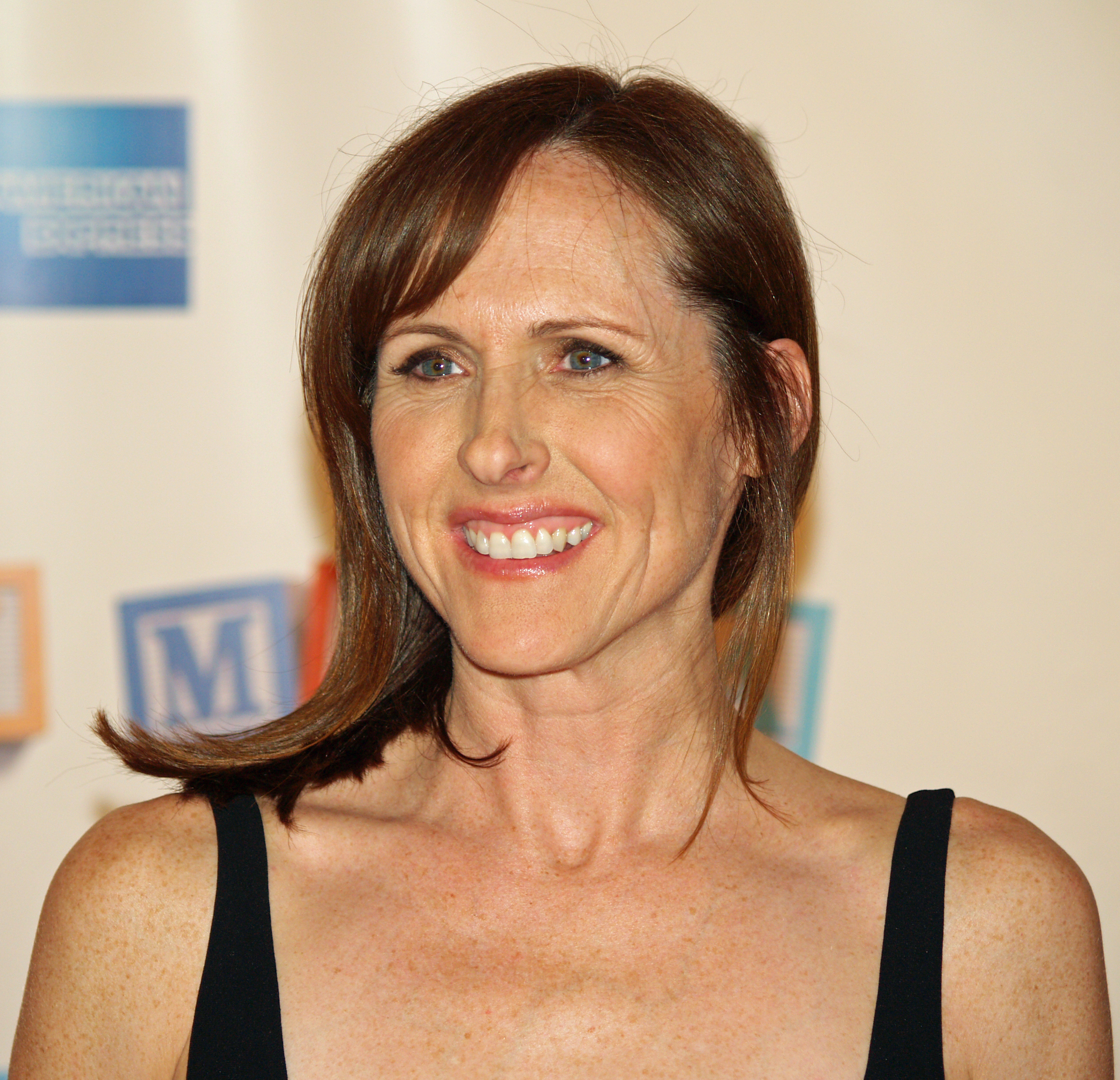
Molly Shannon, Best Supporting Female winner

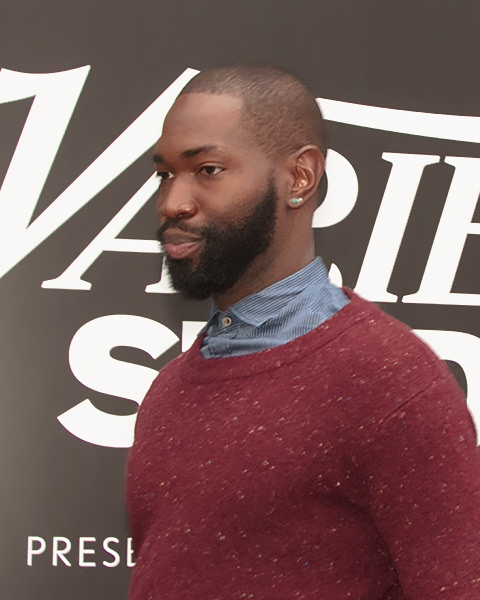
Tarell Alvin McCraney, Best Screenplay co-winner

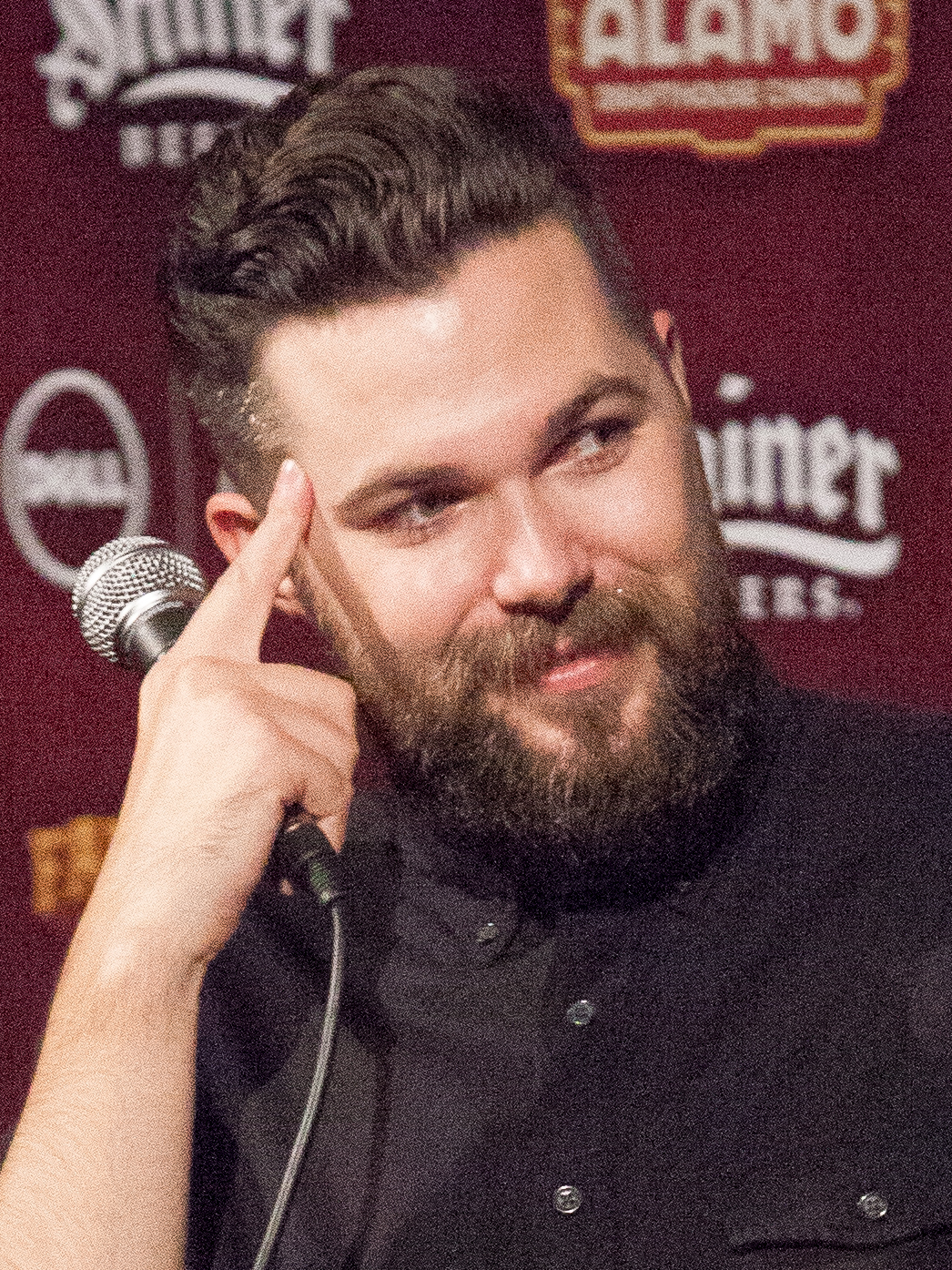
Robert Eggers, Best First Screenplay winner

| Best Feature | Best Director |
|---|---|
| Moonlight: American Honey; Chronic; Jackie; Manchester by the Sea | Barry Jenkins – Moonlight: Andrea Arnold – American Honey; Pablo Larraín – Jackie; Jeff Nichols – Loving; Kelly Reichardt – Certain Women |
| Best Male Lead | Best Female Lead |
| Casey Affleck – Manchester by the Sea as Lee Chandler: David Harewood – Free in Deed as Abe Wilkins; Viggo Mortensen – Captain Fantastic as Ben Cash; Jesse Plemons – Other People as David Mulcahey; Tim Roth – Chronic as David Wilson | Isabelle Huppert – Elle as Michèle Leblanc: Annette Bening – 20th Century Women as Dorothea Fields; Sasha Lane – American Honey as Star; Ruth Negga – Loving as Mildred Loving; Natalie Portman – Jackie as Jackie Kennedy |
| Best Supporting Male | Best Supporting Female |
| Ben Foster – Hell or High Water as Tanner Howard: Ralph Fiennes – A Bigger Splash as Harry Hawkes; Lucas Hedges – Manchester by the Sea as Patrick Chandler; Shia LaBeouf – American Honey as Jake; Craig Robinson – Morris from America as Curtis Gentry | Molly Shannon – Other People as Joanne Mulcahey: Edwina Findley – Free in Deed as Melva Neddy; Paulina García – Little Men as Leonor Calvelli; Lily Gladstone – Certain Women as Jamie; Riley Keough – American Honey as Krystal |
| Best Screenplay | Best First Screenplay |
| Barry Jenkins and Tarell Alvin McCraney – Moonlight: Kenneth Lonergan – Manchester by the Sea; Mike Mills – 20th Century Women; Ira Sachs and Mauricio Zacharias – Little Men; Taylor Sheridan – Hell or High Water | Robert Eggers – The Witch: Chris Kelly – Other People; Adam Mansbach – Barry; Stella Meghie – Jean of the Joneses; Craig Shilowich – Christine |
| Best First Feature | Best Documentary Feature |
| The Witch - Robert Eggers: The Childhood of a Leader; The Fits; Other People; Swiss Army Man - Daniels | O.J.: Made in America: 13th; Cameraperson; I Am Not Your Negro; Sonita; Under the Sun |
| Best Cinematography | Best Editing |
| James Laxton – Moonlight: Ava Berkofsky – Free in Deed; Lol Crawley – The Childhood of a Leader; Zach Kuperstein – The Eyes of My Mother; Robbie Ryan – American Honey | Joi McMillon and Nat Sanders – Moonlight: Matthew Hannam – Swiss Army Man; Jennifer Lame – Manchester by the Sea; Jake Roberts – Hell or High Water; Sebastián Sepúlveda – Jackie |
Best International Film
Toni Erdmann (Germany / Romania): Aquarius (Brazil); Chevalier (Greece); My Golden Days (Trois souvenirs de ma jeunesse) (France); Under the Shadow (Zeer-e sāye) (Iran / UK)

=== Films with multiple nominations and awards ===
Films that received multiple nominations
| Nominations | Film |
|---|---|
| 6 | American Honey |
| 5 | Manchester by the Sea |
| 5 | Moonlight |
| 4 | Jackie |
| 4 | Other People |
| 3 | Free in Deed |
| 3 | The Fits |
| 3 | Hell or High Water |
| 2 | 20th Century Women |
| 2 | Certain Women |
| 2 | The Childhood of a Leader |
| 2 | Christine |
| 2 | Chronic |
| 2 | Little Men |
| 2 | Loving |
| 2 | Swiss Army Man |
| 2 | The Witch |

Films that won multiple awards
| Awards | Film |
|---|---|
| 6 | Moonlight |
| 2 | The Witch |

== Special awards ==
=== John Cassavetes Award ===
- Spa Night
  - Free in Deed
  - Hunter Gatherer
  - Lovesong
  - Nakom

=== Robert Altman Award ===
(The award is given to its film director, casting director, and ensemble cast)

- Moonlight – Barry Jenkins, Yesi Ramirez, Mahershala Ali, Patrick Decile, Naomie Harris, Alex Hibbert, André Holland, Jharrel Jerome, Janelle Monáe, Jaden Piner, Trevante Rhodes and Ashton Sanders

=== Kiehl's Someone to Watch Award ===
Recognizes a talented filmmaker of singular vision who has not yet received appropriate recognition. The award includes a $25,000 unrestricted grant funded by Kiehl's since 1851.

- Anna Rose Holmer – The Fits
  - Andrew Ahn – Spa Night
  - Claire Carré – Embers
  - Ingrid Jungermann – Women Who Kill

=== Piaget Producers Award ===
Honors emerging producers who, despite highly limited resources, demonstrate the creativity, tenacity and vision required to produce quality, independent films. The award includes a $25,000 unrestricted grant funded by Piaget.

- Jordana Mollick – Hello, My Name Is Doris
  - Lisa Kjerulff – The Fits
  - Melody C. Roscher and Craig Shilowich – Christine

=== Truer than Fiction Award ===
Presented to an emerging director of non-fiction features who has not yet received significant recognition. The award includes a $25,000 unrestricted grant.

- Nanfu Wang – Hooligan Sparrow
  - Kristi Jacobson – Solitary
  - Sara Jordenö – Kiki
