= Jawal Nga =

American film producer

- Occupations: Film producer and writer
- Years active: 2003–present

Jawal Nga is a film producer and writer based in New York City.

== Professional career ==
In 2004, Nga produced director Ira Sachs' "Forty Shades of Blue", starring Rip Torn. An official entry in six international film festivals, Forty Shades of Blue won the Grand Jury Prize at the 2005 Sundance Film Festival. The film was also nominated for a special prize at the Deauville Film Festival, and was nominated for an Independent Spirit Award for actress Dina Korzun. In 2006, Nga and Sachs again worked together on the period drama, "Married Life", which starred Pierce Brosnan, Rachel McAdams, Patricia Clarkson and Chris Cooper. It was released in September 2007. Nga produced the film along with Sidney Kimmel, Steven Golin and Ira Sachs who also directed the film for Sidney Kimmel Entertainment.

He is the executive producer of the Allen Ginsberg documentary "Howl" for directors Rob Epstein and Jeffrey Friedman.

Nga served as an executive producer of writer/director Joel Hopkins's "Last Chance Harvey." Starring Emma Thompson and Dustin Hoffman, the film was shot in London in late 2007.

=== Producer credits ===
- Howl (2010) (executive producer)
- Last Chance Harvey (2008) (executive producer)
- Married Life (2007) (producer)
- Forty Shades of Blue (2005) (producer)
- Chasing Daylight (2004) (producer)
- The Clearing (2004) (associate producer)... aka Anatomie einer Entführung (Germany)
- Underdog (2003) (producer)

=== Miscellaneous crew ===
- Wo hu cang long (2000) (assistant: Mr. Schamus)... aka Crouching Tiger, Hidden Dragon (International: English title) (UK) (US)
