= Rogue Agent =

Rogue Agent may refer to:

- Rogue Agent (film), a 2022 British film
- GoldenEye: Rogue Agent, a 2004 first-person shooter game
