= Free in Deed =

2015 film by Jake Mahaffy

- Film poster
- Directed by: Jake Mahaffy
- Written by: Jake Mahaffy
- Produced by: Mike S. Ryan; Michael Bowes; Brent Stiefel
- Starring: David Harewood; Edwina Findley; RaJay Chandler
- Cinematography: Ava Berkofsky
- Edited by: Jake Mahaffy; Michael Taylor; Simon Price
- Music by: Tim Oxton
- Production companies: Greyshack Films; Votiv Films
- Distributed by: Gravitas Ventures (United States)
- Release dates: September 11, 2015 (Venice); September 8, 2017 (United States)
- Running time: 98 minutes
- Countries: United States; New Zealand
- Language: English
- Budget: $230,000

Free in Deed is a 2015 drama film written, directed, and co-edited by Jake Mahaffy. An international co-production between the United States and New Zealand, it stars David Harewood, Edwina Findley, and RaJay Chandler. It is based on true events, and tells the story of a lonely Pentecostal minister who attempts to perform a miracle when a young woman asks him to heal her son from a seemingly incurable illness.

The film had its world premiere at the 72nd Venice International Film Festival on September 11, 2015, where it won the Orizzonti Award for Best Film. It was given a limited theatrical release in the United States on September 8, 2017, by Gravitas Ventures. It received positive reviews from critics, and was nominated for Best Male Lead (for Harewood), Best Supporting Female (for Findley), Best Cinematography (for Berkofsky), and the John Cassavetes Award at the 32nd Independent Spirit Awards.

== Synopsis ==
In the world of storefront churches, Pentecostal minister Abe Wilkins tries to perform a miracle. When Melva Neddy, a single mother on the brink of desperation, brings her tormented young son to church for healing, Wilkins is not only forced to confront the seemingly incurable illness of the child, but his own demons as well. And the more he prays, the more things seem to spiral out of his control.

== Cast ==
- David Harewood as Abe Wilkins
- Edwina Findley as Melva Neddy
- RaJay Chandler as Benny
- Preston Shannon as Bishop
- Prophetess Libra as Mother
- Helen Bowman as Isabelle
- Zoe Lewis as Etta
- Kathy Smith as Pearlie
- Billie Worley as Senior Detective
- Darius Wallace as Health Inspector
- Jon W. Sparks as Doctor
- Alex Coker as Officer Buff

== Production ==
Free in Deed is based on the real-life story of Milwaukee minister Ray Hemphill, who was convicted of child abuse for his attempt to perform an exorcism on an eight-year-old boy in 2003. Jake Mahaffy said about adapting the story into the film:

I had been raised religious and then deconverted, so I felt I have both the familiarity and objectivity to represent this situation. The point is not to make a reenactment or docudrama but to take the emotional truth of the circumstance and recreate that for audiences. People who have never been to church or never been poor or never been to America should feel what it would be like rather than only know the facts and details of the news story.

Free in Deed was produced by Greyshack Films and Votiv Films, in association with the New Zealand Film Commission. Principal photography took place in Memphis, Tennessee in February 2014.

== Reception ==
=== Critical response ===
On the review aggregator website Rotten Tomatoes, 100% of 9 critics' reviews are positive, with an average rating of 8.0/10. Metacritic, which uses a weighted average, assigned the film a score of 81 out of 100, based on 5 critics, indicating "universal acclaim".

Manohla Dargis of The New York Times stated, "The movie's realism owes much to the lived-in locations and its two excellent leads, who fill in the gaps with nuanced emotional texture; the script doesn't tell you much about who these people are, but the actors do."

Michael Rechtshaffen of the Los Angeles Times called the film "bleakly spare, powerful" and noted, "The fact-based story, which is allowed to quietly unfold in a series of extended takes, has been stripped of all artifice, especially in regard to the pared-back performances of Harewood and Findley."

Jessica Kiang of IndieWire gave the film a grade of "B+/A-" and remarked, "This small, slow-paced film, deeply upsetting and narrow in scope, is a hard watch. […] But Mahaffy's uncompromising approach, and the quality of its performances, make it a rare and valuable testament."

Guy Lodge of Variety described the film as a "searing, skeptical but roundly compassionate ecclesiastical drama" and commented, "Superb, skin-prickling performances by the three principals contribute invaluably to the pic's stern believability."

The Hollywood Reporter's critic wrote, "Mahaffy's film paints a portrait of institutional failure on multiple fronts, leaving society's castoffs in free fall. He shows authorities becoming involved only in times of crisis, or to stifle good deeds with red tape."

=== Accolades ===
Free in Deed won the Orizzonti Award for Best Film at the 72nd Venice International Film Festival, beating out 34 other films. At the 32nd Independent Spirit Awards, it garnered four nominations: Best Male Lead (for Harewood), Best Supporting Female (for Findley), Best Cinematography, and the John Cassavetes Award.
