= Independent Spirit Award for Best Supporting Female =

Film award

- Presented by: Film Independent
- First award: Anjelica Huston; The Dead (1987)
- Final award: Ruth Negga; Passing (2021)
- Website: filmindependent.org

The Independent Spirit Award for Best Supporting Female was an award presented annually by Film Independent. It is given in honor of an actress who has delivered an absolutely outstanding performance in a supporting role while working in an independent film. It was first presented in 1985 with Anjelica Huston being the first recipient of the award for her role as Gretta Conroy in The Dead. It was last presented in 2022 with Ruth Negga being the final recipient of the award for her role in Passing.

In 2022, it was announced that the four acting categories would be retired and replaced with two gender neutral categories, with both Best Supporting Male and Best Supporting Female merging into the Best Supporting Performance category.

Since its inception, the award has been given to 33 actresses. With 3 nominations, Allison Janney is the most nominated female in this category (finally winning one for her performance in I, Tonya).

== Winners and nominees ==
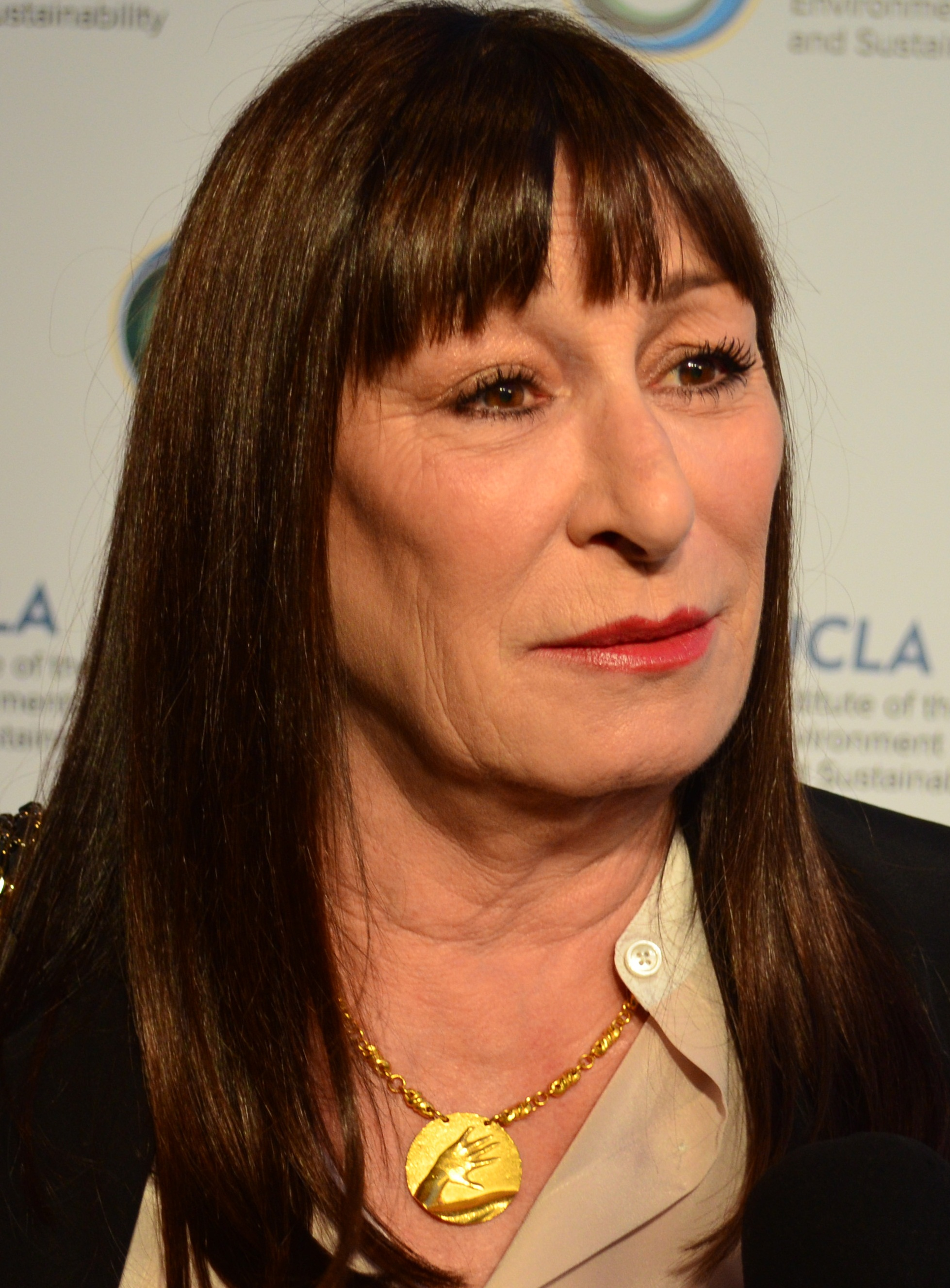
Angelica Huston won for The Dead (1987).

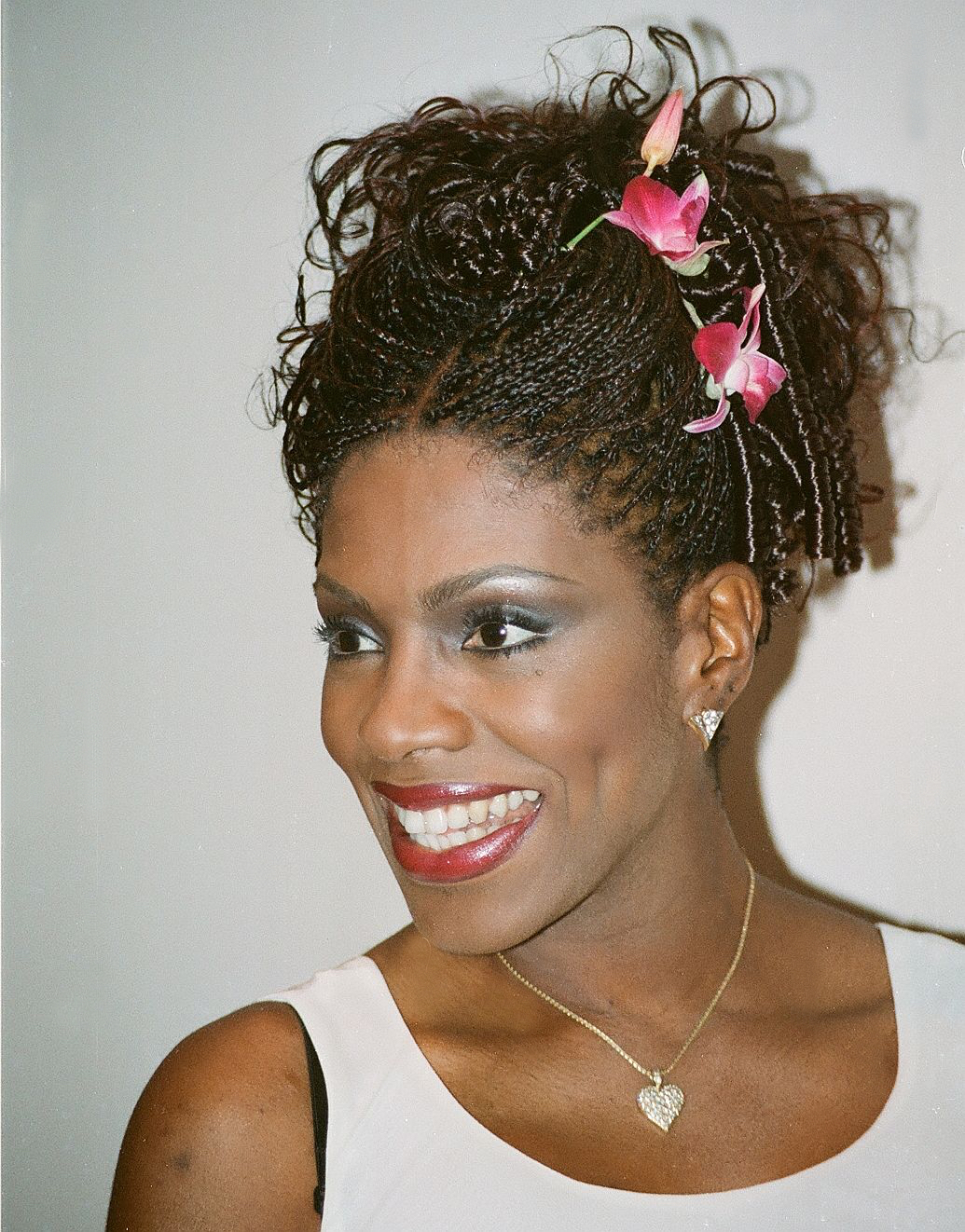
Sheryl Lee Ralph won for To Sleep with Anger (1990).

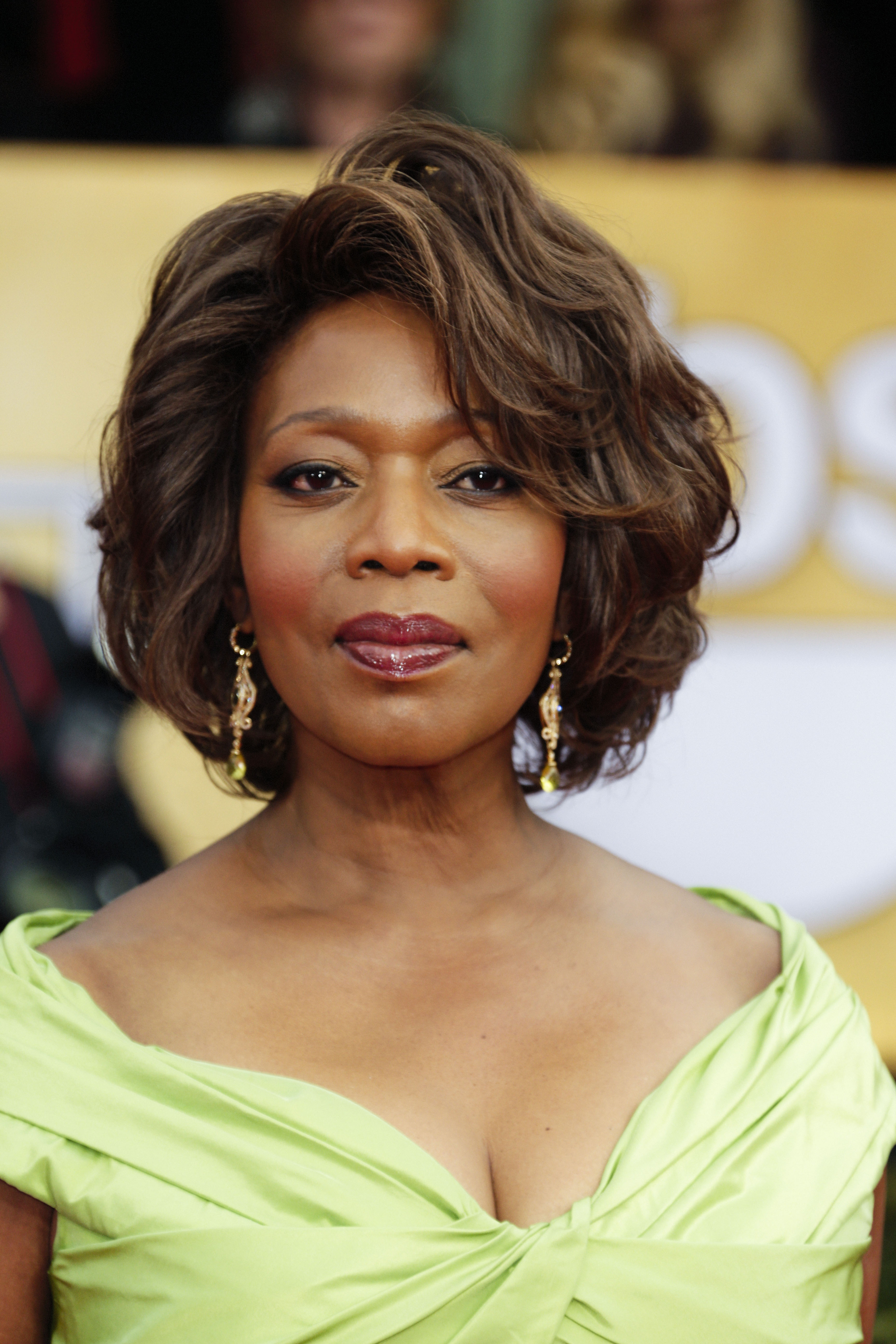
Alfre Woodard won for Passion Fish (1992).

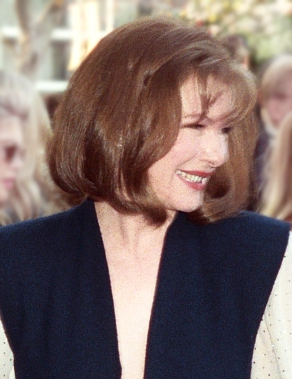
Dianne Wiest won for Bullets over Broadway (1994).

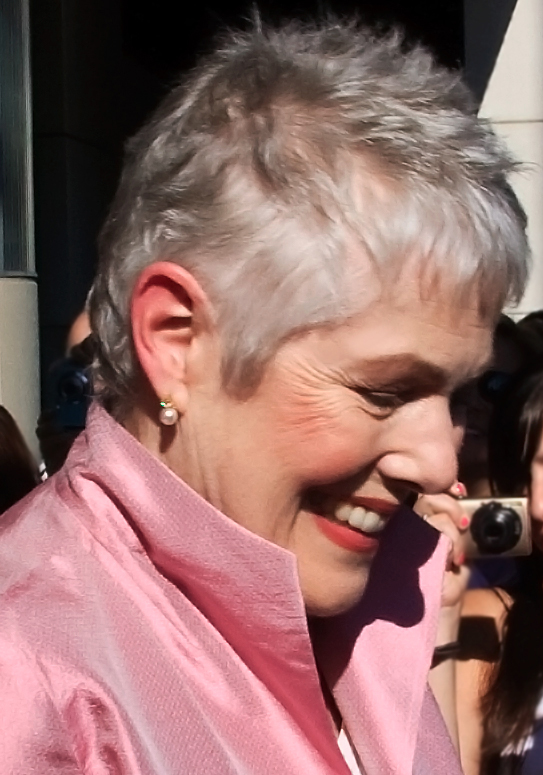
Lynn Redgrave won for Gods and Monsters (1998).

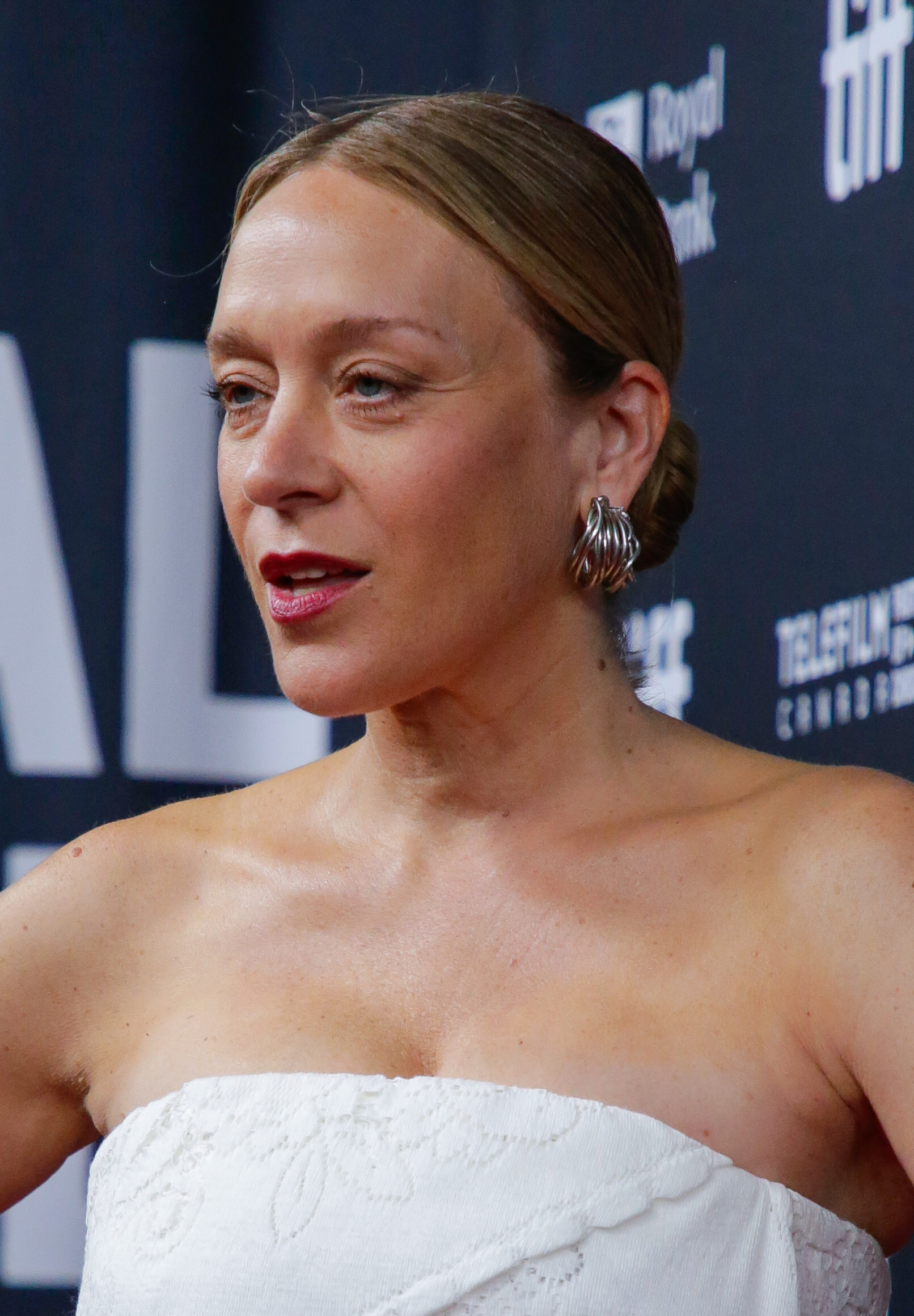
Chloë Sevigny won for Boys Don't Cry (1999).

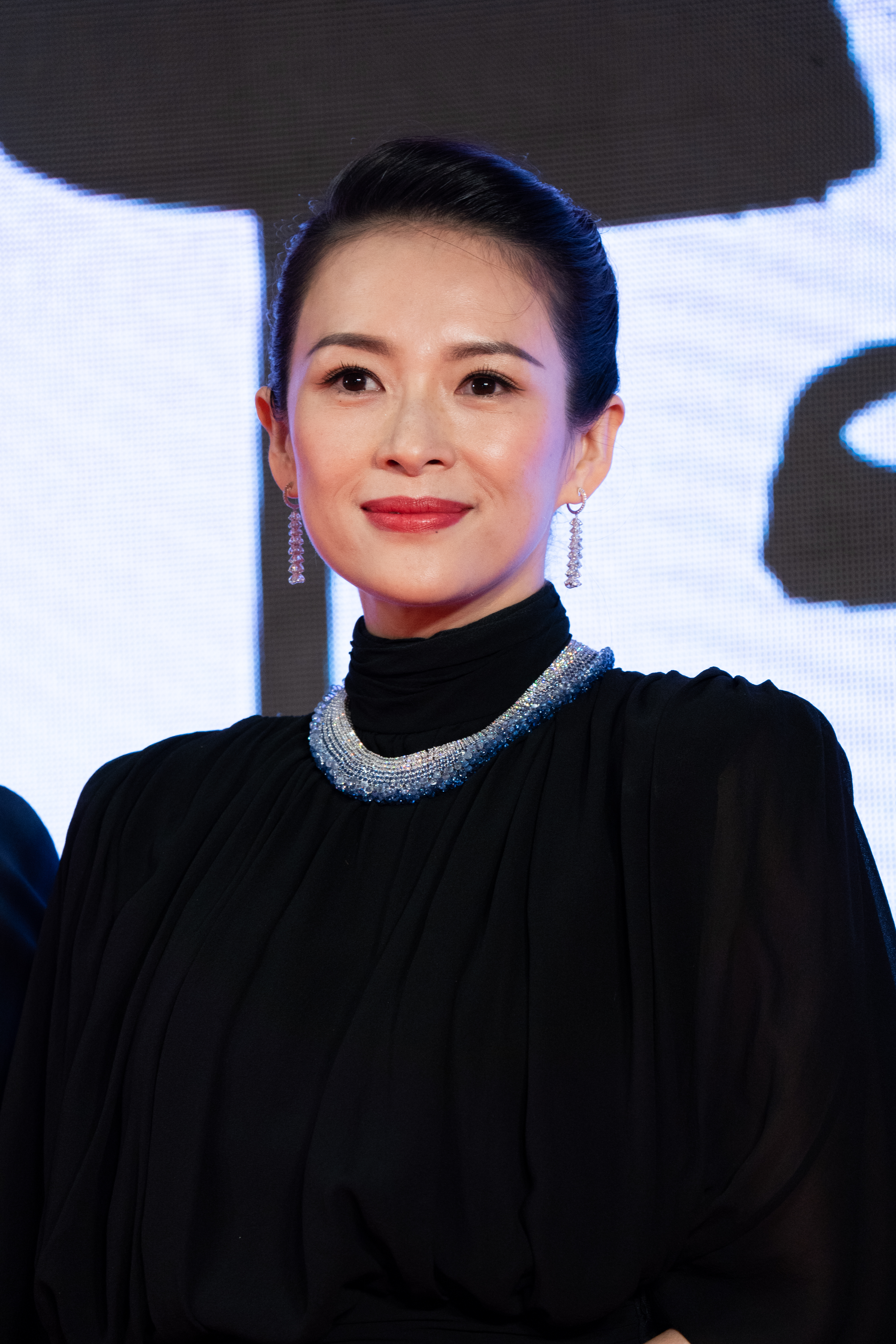
Zhang Ziyi won for Crouching Tiger, Hidden Dragon (2000).

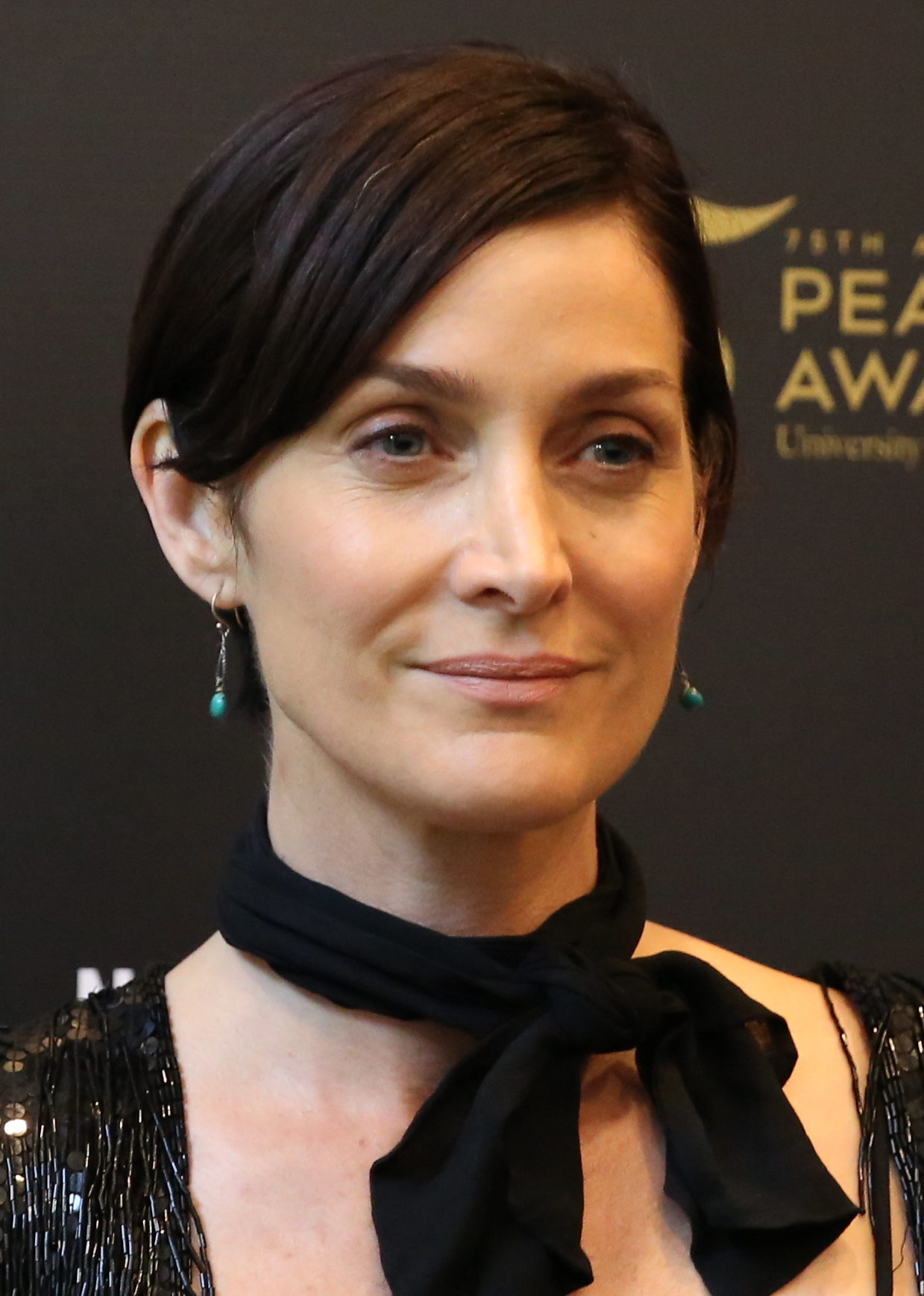
Carrie-Anne Moss won for Memento (2001).

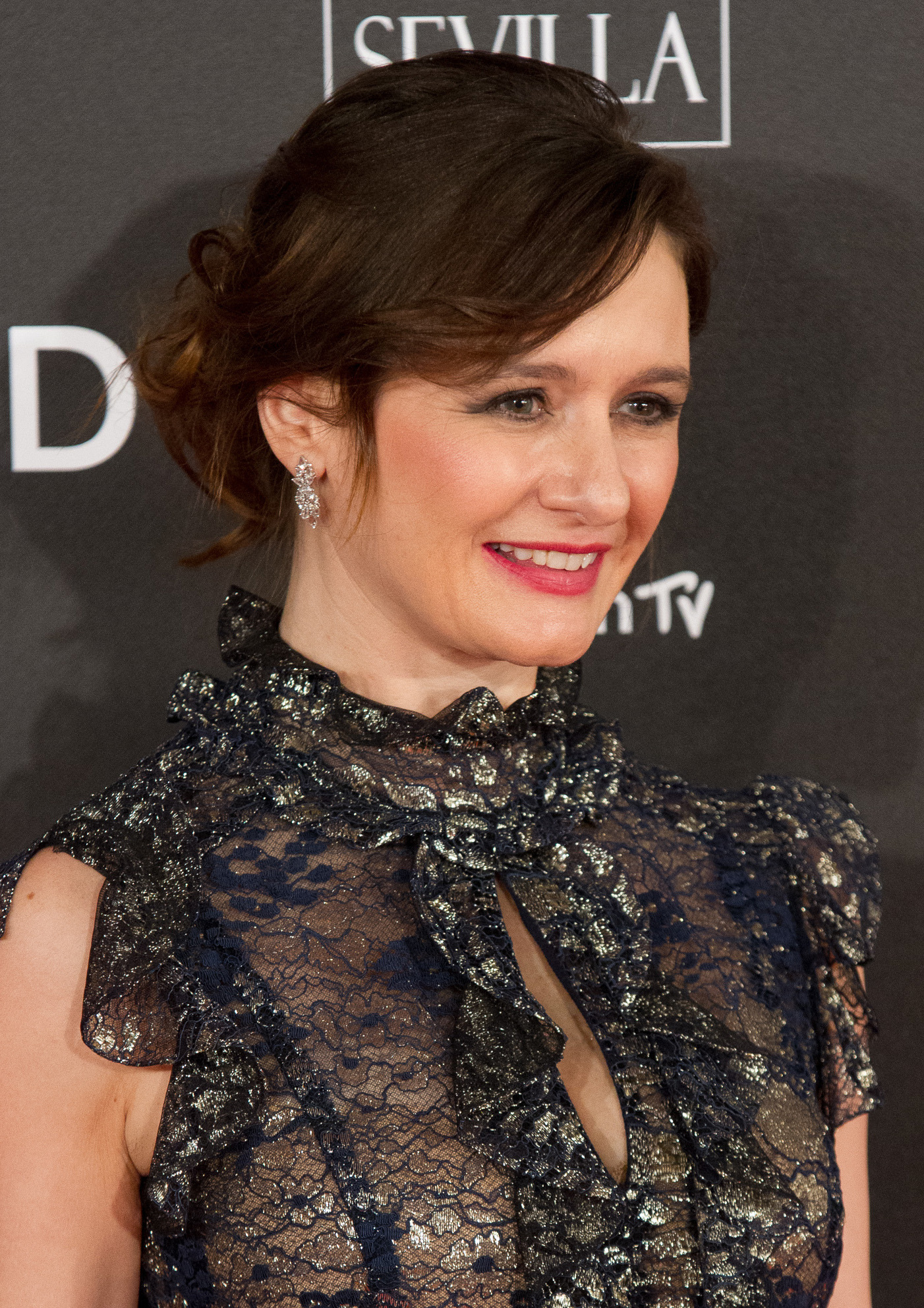
Emily Mortimer won for Lovely & Amazing (2001).

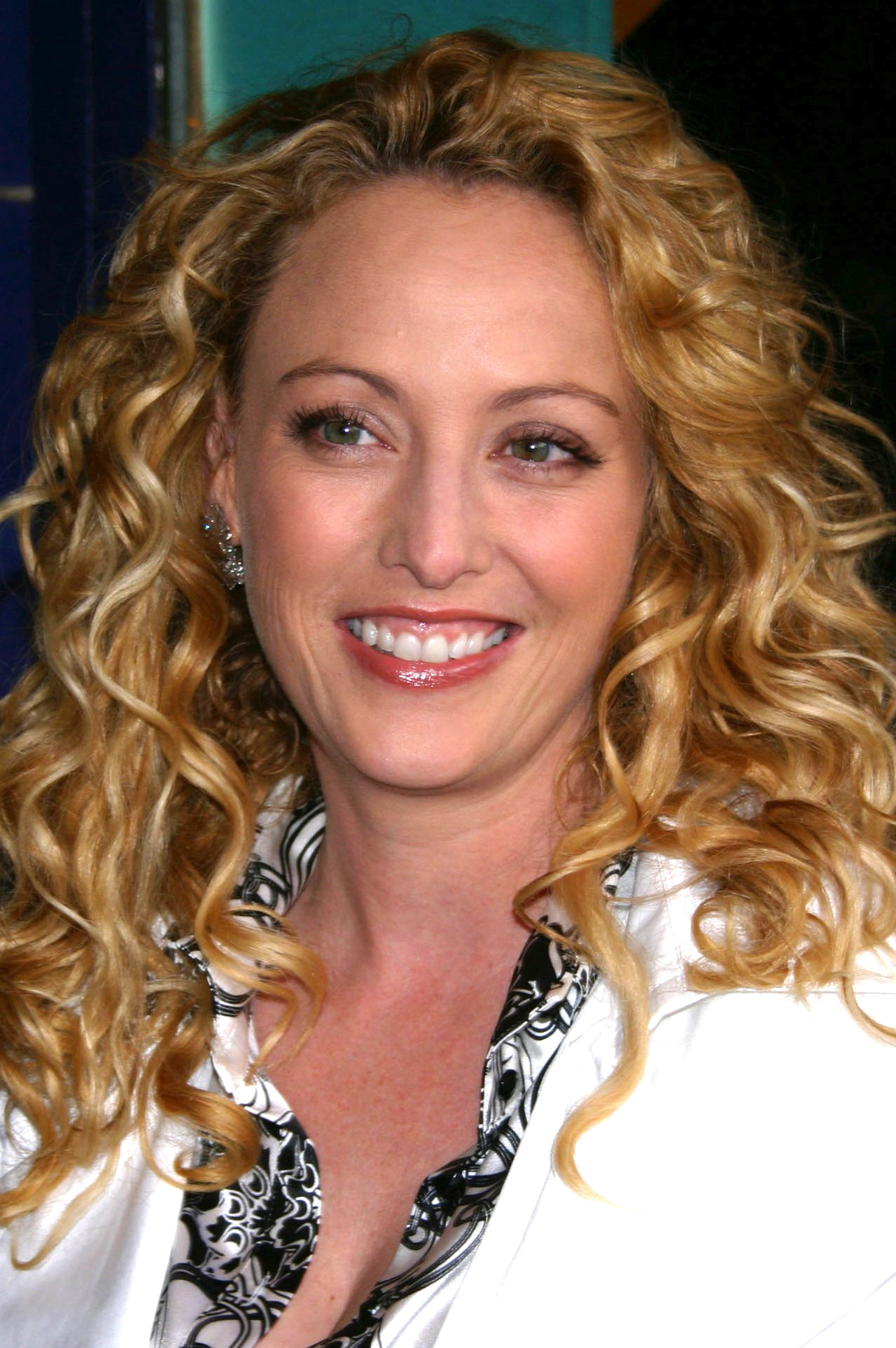
Virginia Madsen won for Sideways (2004).

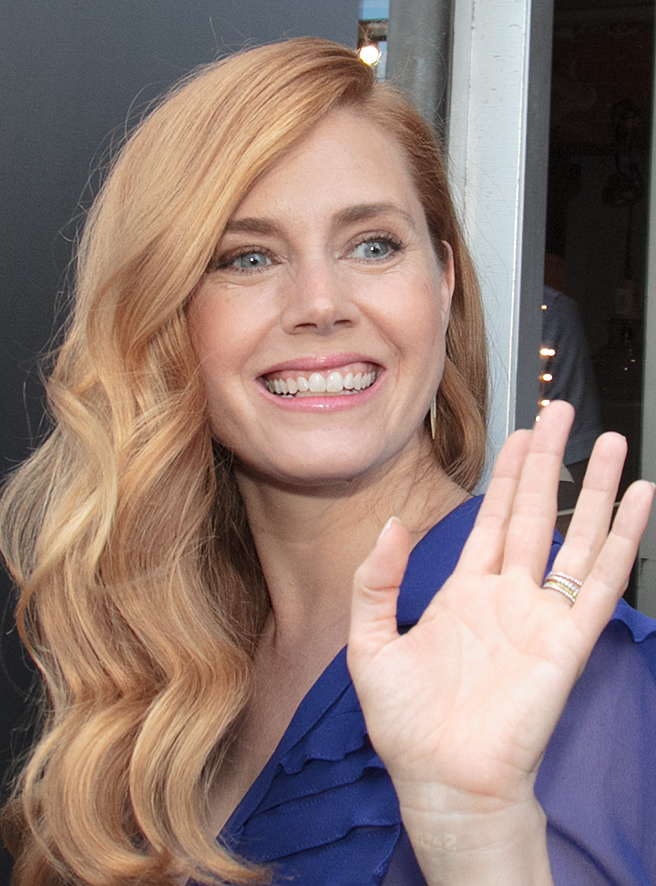
Amy Adams won for Junebug (2005).

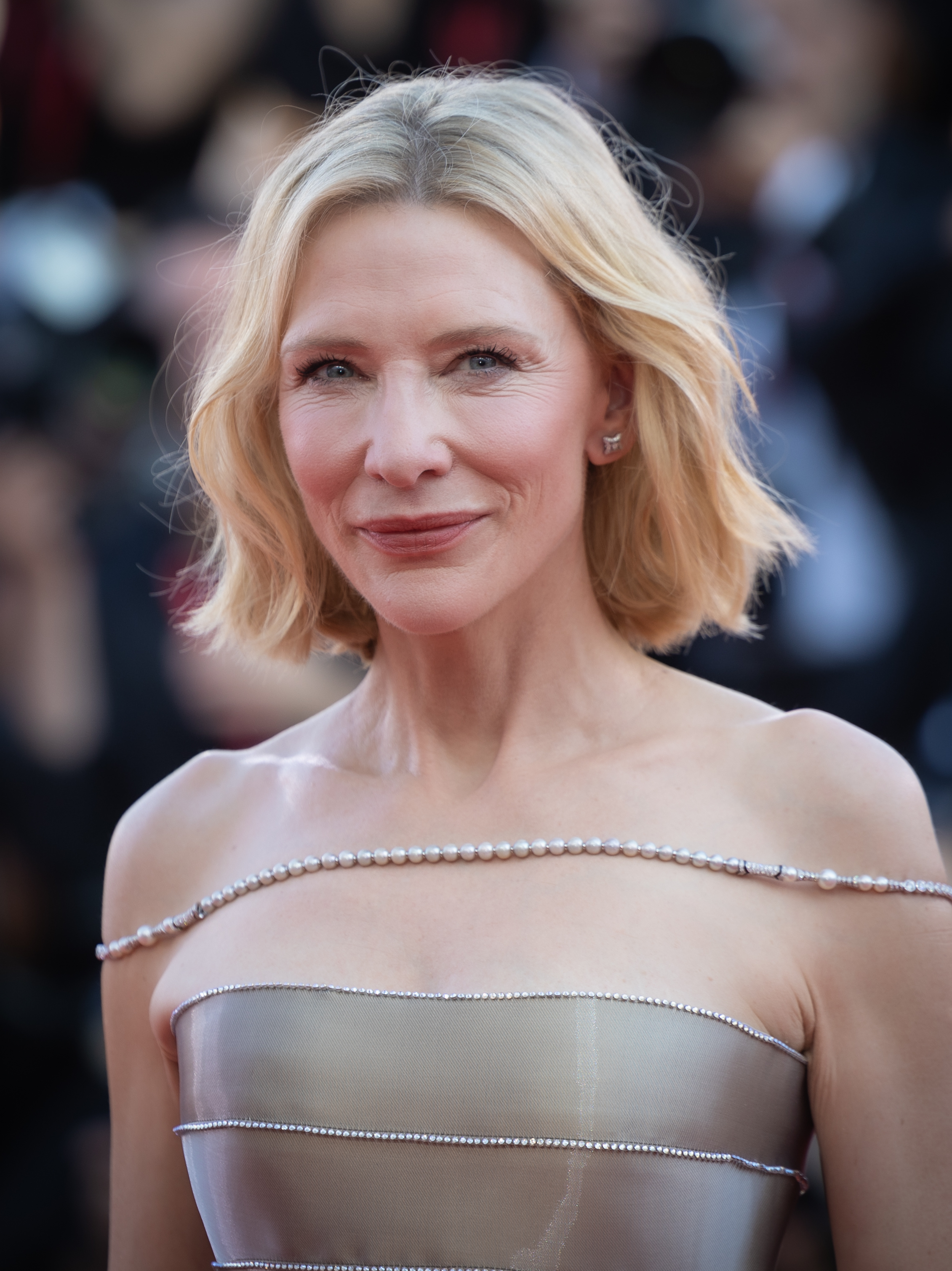
Cate Blanchett won for I'm Not There (2007).

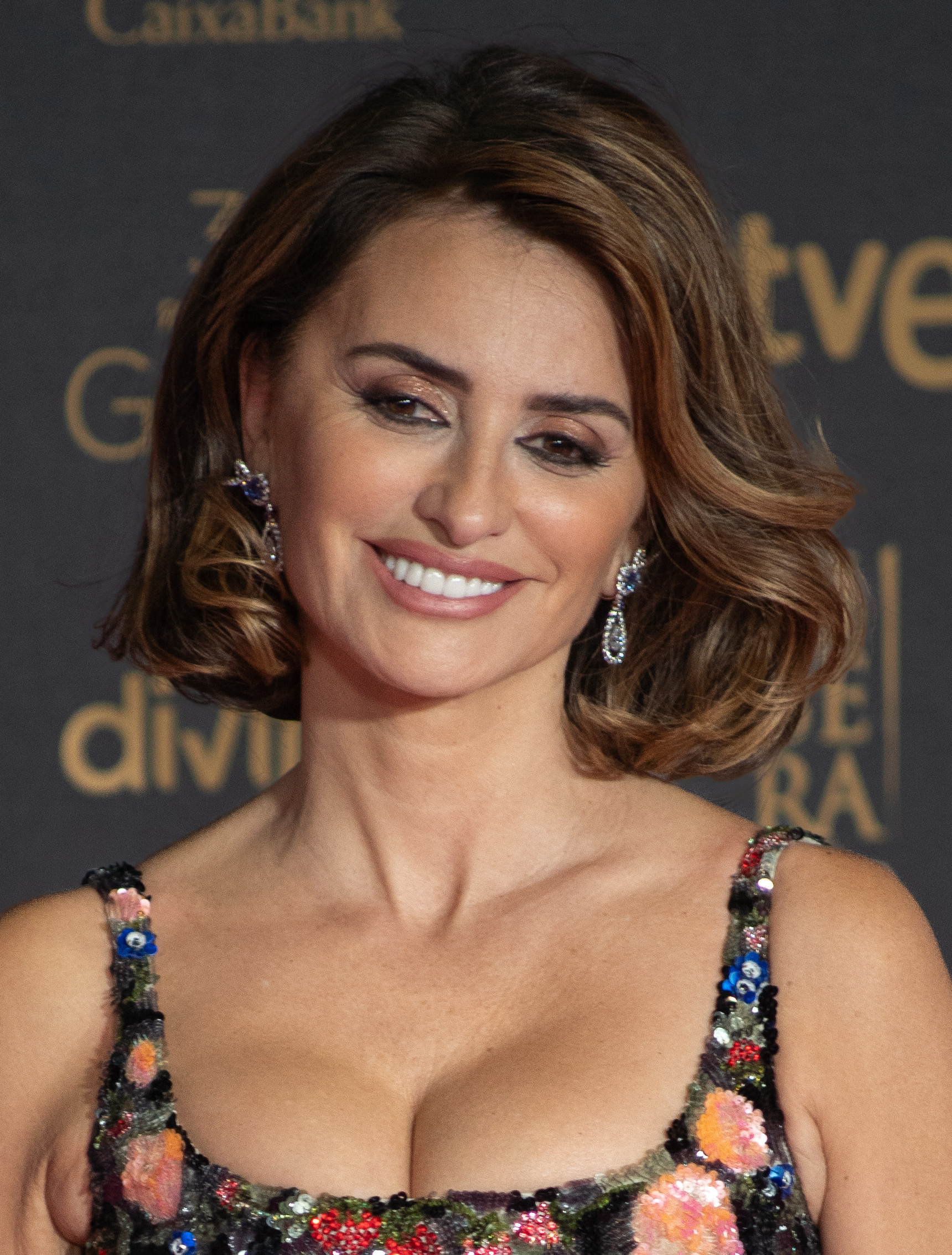
Penelope Cruz won for Vicky Cristina Barcelona (2008).

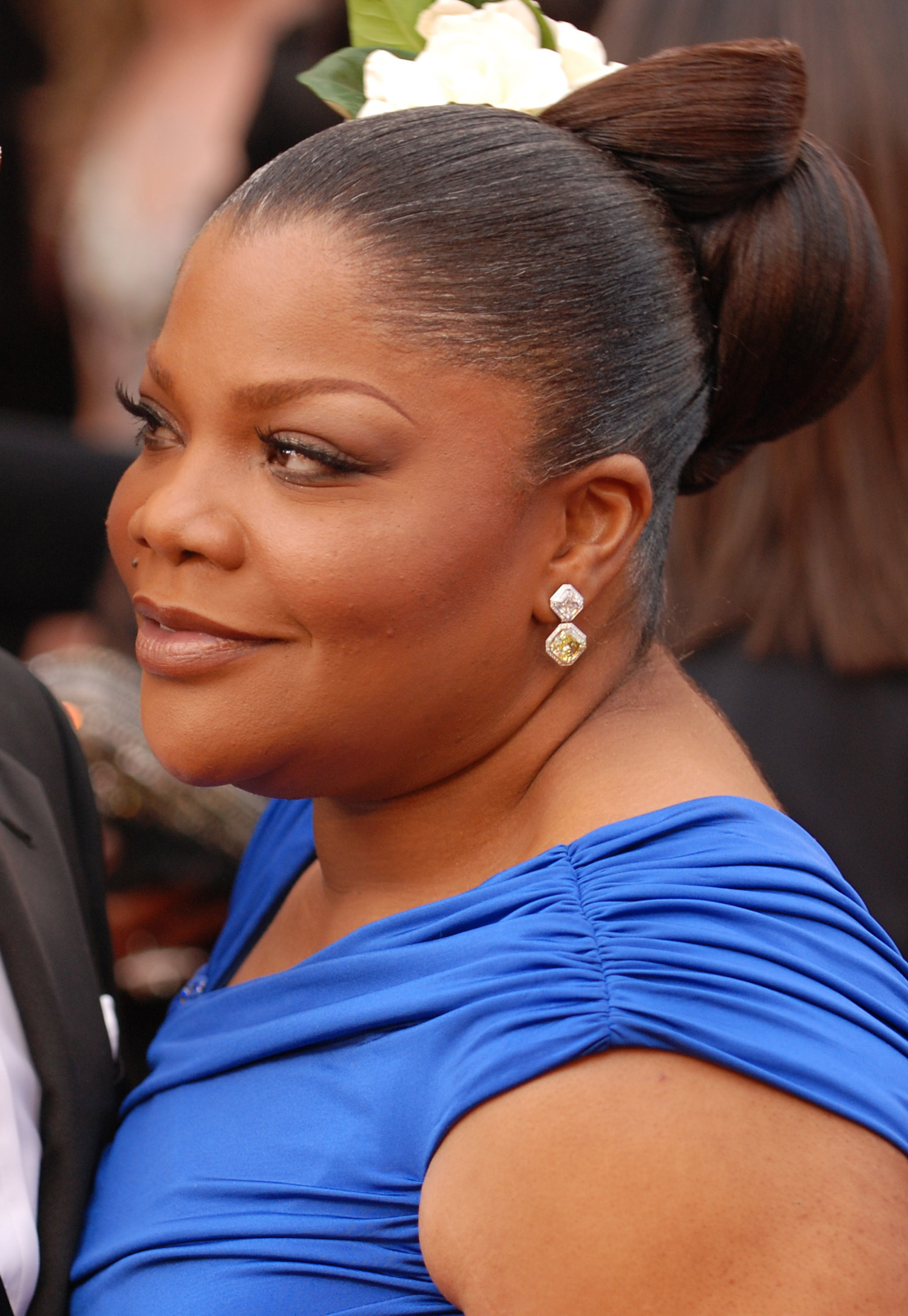
Mo'Nique won for Precious (2009).

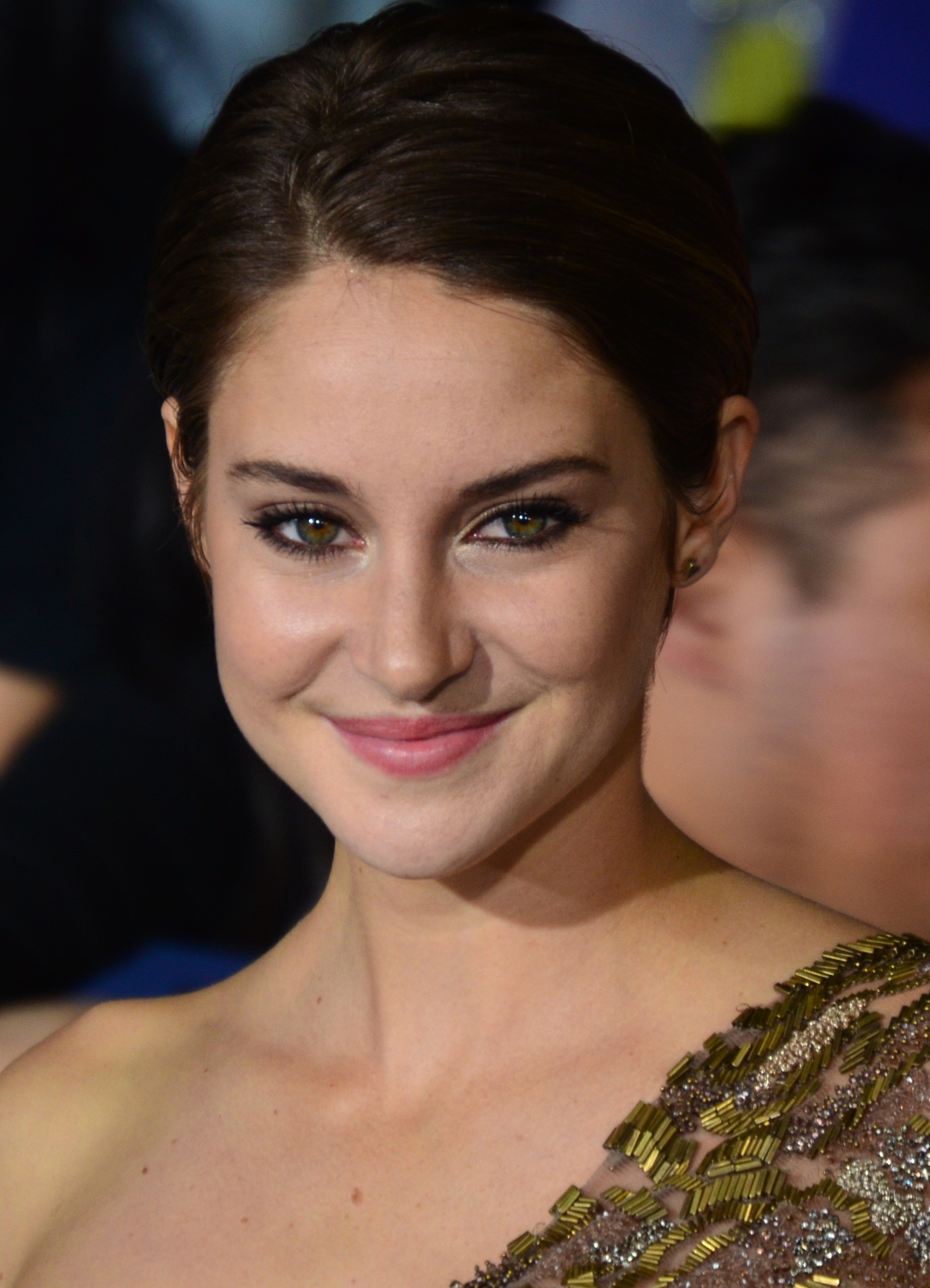
Shailene Woodley won for The Descendants (2011).

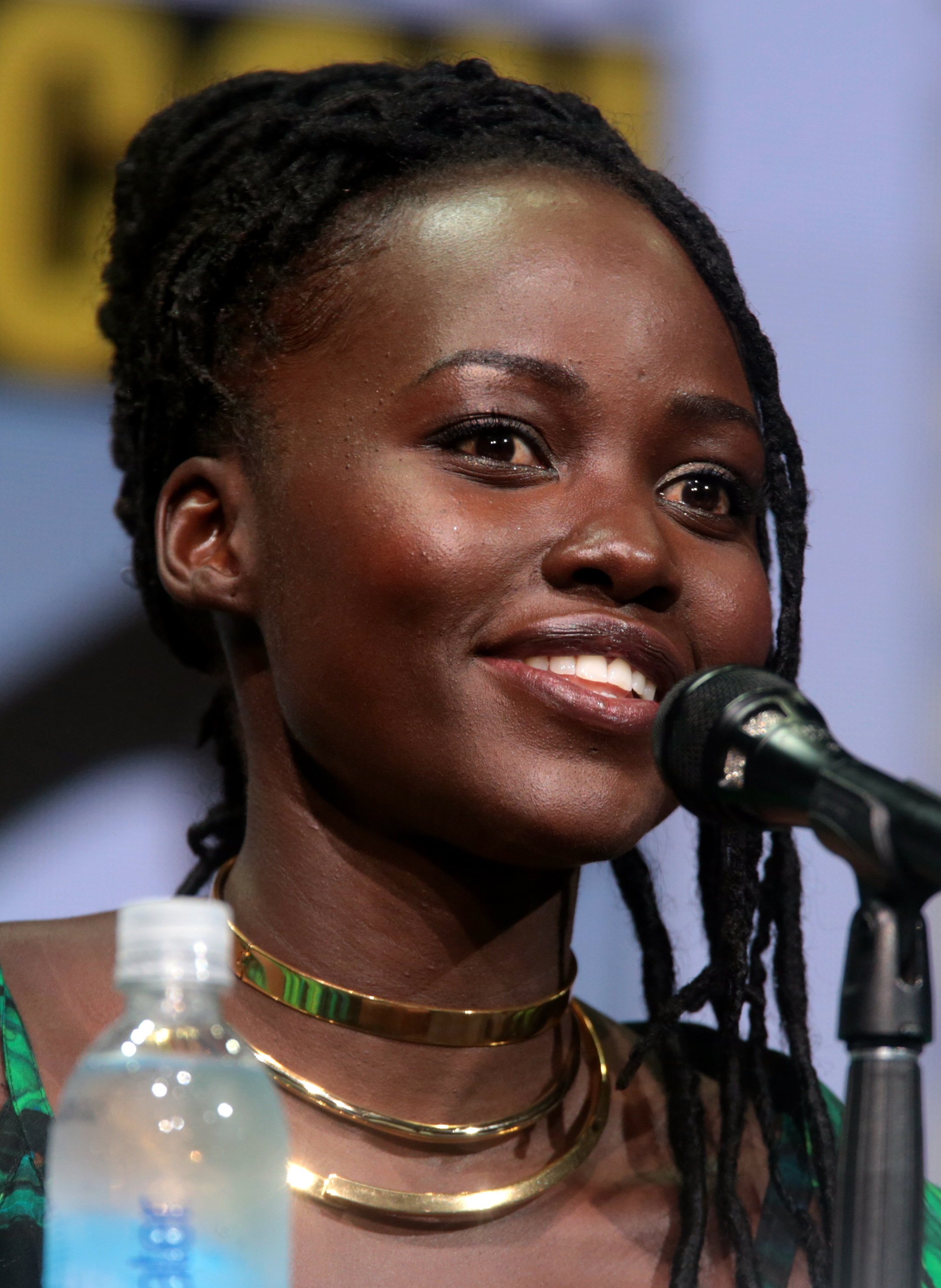
Lupita Nyong'o won for 12 Years a Slave (2013).

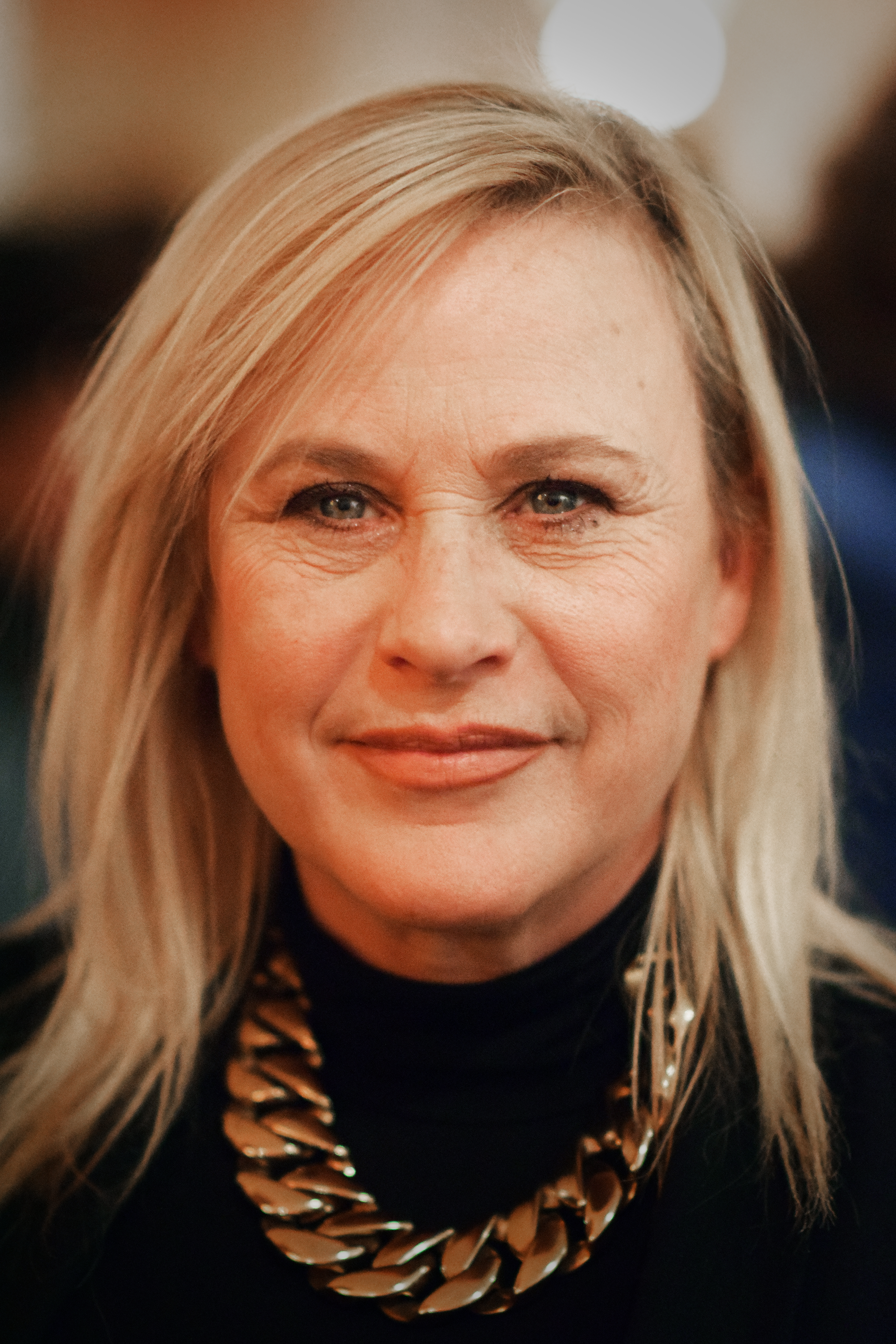
Patricia Arquette won for Boyhood (2014).

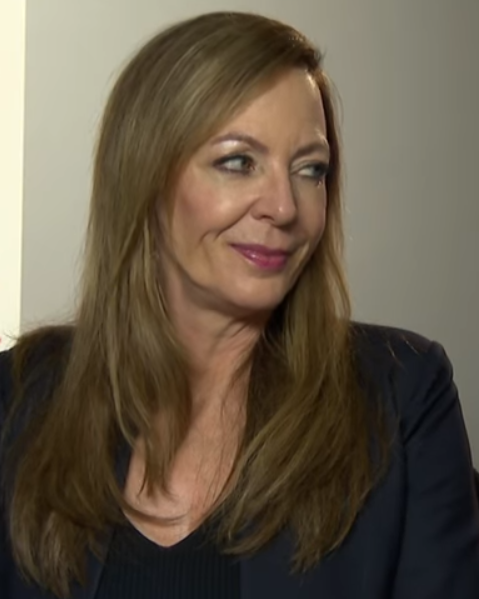
Allison Janney won for I, Tonya (2017).

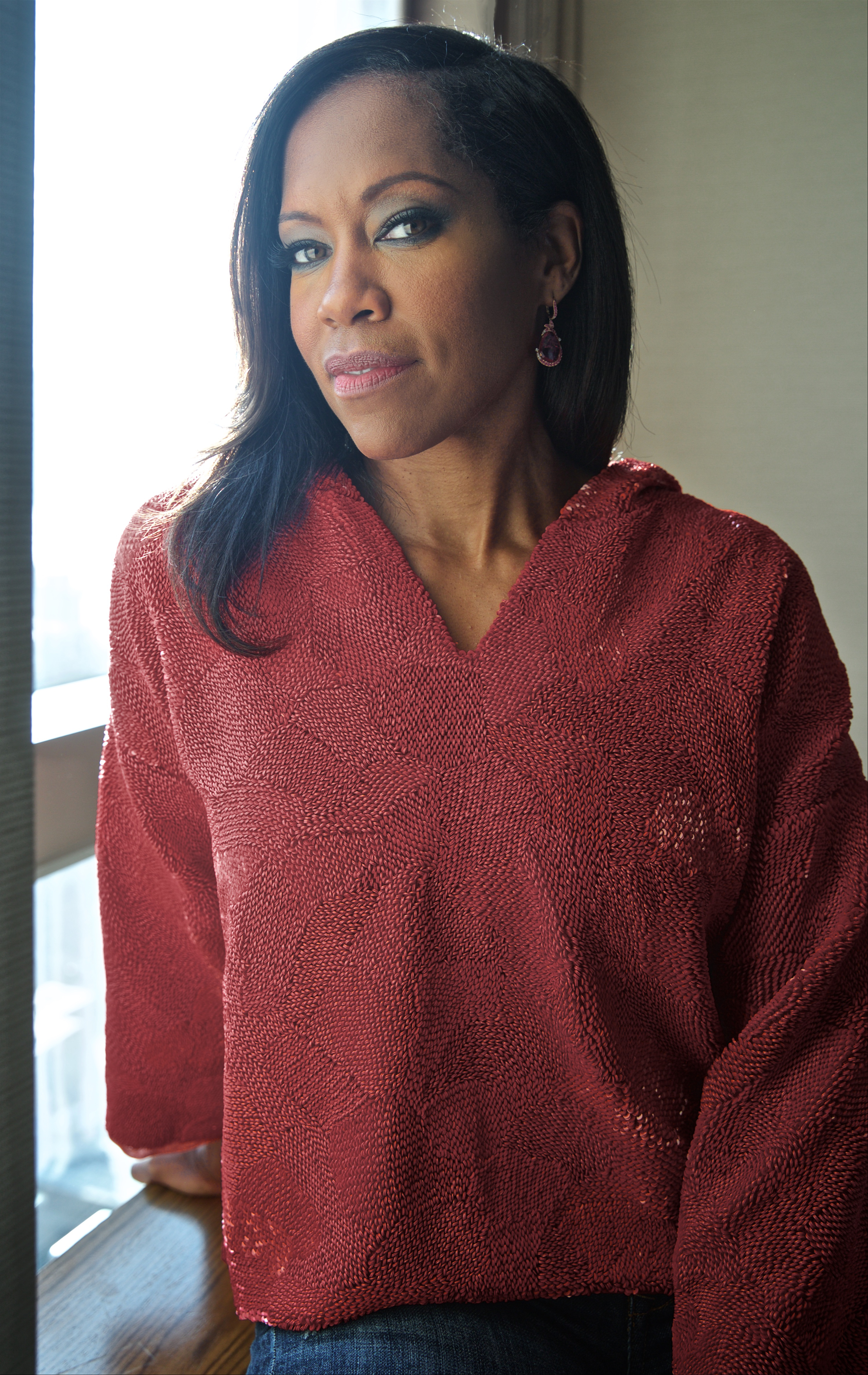
Regina King won for If Beale Street Could Talk (2018).

=== 1980s ===
Year	Actress	Film	Role
1987	Anjelica Huston	The Dead	Gretta Conroy
1987	Karen Allen	The Glass Menagerie	Laura Wingfield
1987	Kathy Baker	Street Smart	Punchy
1987	Martha Plimpton	Shy People	Grace
1987	Ann Sothern	The Whales of August	Tisha Doughty
1988	Rosanna DeSoto	Stand and Deliver	Fabiola Escalante
1988	Bonnie Bedelia	The Prince of Pennsylvania	Pam Marshetta
1988	Debbie Harry	Hairspray	Velma Von Tussle
1988	Amy Madigan	The Prince of Pennsylvania	Carla Headlee
1988	Patti Yasutake	The Wash	Marsha
1989	Laura San Giacomo	Sex, Lies, and Videotape	Cynthia Patrice Bishop
1989	Bridget Fonda	Shag	Melaina Buller
1989	Heather Graham	Drugstore Cowboy	Nadine
1989	Mare Winningham	Miracle Mile	Julie Peters
1989	Mary Woronov	Scenes from the Class Struggle in Beverly Hills	Lisabeth Hepburn-Saravian

=== 1990s ===
Year	Actress	Film	Role
1990	Sheryl Lee Ralph	To Sleep with Anger	Linda
1990	Tracy Arnold	Henry: Portrait of a Serial Killer	Becky
1990	Ethel Ayler	To Sleep with Anger	Hattie
1990	Tisha Campbell-Martin	House Party	Sidney
1990	Adrienne-Joi Johnson	House Party	Sharane
1991	Diane Ladd	Rambling Rose	Mother
1991	Sheila McCarthy	Bright Angel	Nina
1991	Deirdre O'Connell	Pastime	Inez Brice
1991	Emma Thompson	Impromptu	Duchess D'Antan
1991	Mary B. Ward	Hangin' with the Homeboys	Luna
1992	Alfre Woodard	Passion Fish	Chantelle
1992	Brooke Adams	Gas Food Lodging	Nora
1992	Sara Gilbert	Poison Ivy	Sylvie Cooper
1992	Karen Sillas	Simple Men	Kate
1992	Danitra Vance	Jumpin' at the Boneyard	Jeanette
1993	Lili Taylor	Household Saints	Teresa Carmela Santangelo
1993	Lara Flynn Boyle	Equinox	Beverly Franks
1993	Gua Ah-leh	The Wedding Banquet	Mrs. Gao
1993	Lucinda Jenney	American Heart	Charlotte
1993	Julianne Moore	Short Cuts	Marian Wyman
1994	Dianne Wiest	Bullets over Broadway	Helen Sinclair
1994	V.S. Brodie	Go Fish	Ely
1994	Carla Gallo	Spanking the Monkey	Toni Peck
1994	Kelly Lynch	The Beans of Egypt, Maine	Roberta Bean
1994	Brooke Smith	Vanya on 42nd Street	Sonya
1995	Mare Winningham	Georgia	Georgia Flood
1995	Jennifer Lopez	My Family	Young Maria
1995	Vanessa Redgrave	Little Odessa	Irina Shapira
1995	Chloë Sevigny	Kids	Jennie
1995	Celia Weston	Dead Man Walking	Mary Beth Percy
1996	Elizabeth Peña	Lone Star	Pilar Cruz
1996	Mary Kay Place	Manny & Lo	Elaine
1996	Queen Latifah	Set It Off	Cleopatra 'Cleo' Sims
1996	Lili Taylor	Girls Town	Patti Lucci
1996	Lily Tomlin	Flirting with Disaster	Mary Schlichting
1997	Debbi Morgan	Eve's Bayou	Mozelle Batiste Delacroix
1997	Farrah Fawcett	The Apostle	Jessie Dewey
1997	Amy Madigan	Loved	Brett Amerson
1997	Miranda Richardson	The Apostle	Toosie
1997	Patricia Richardson	Ulee's Gold	Connie Hope
1998	Lynn Redgrave	Gods and Monsters	Hanna
1998	Stockard Channing	The Baby Dance	Rachel Luckman
1998	Patricia Clarkson	High Art	Greta
1998	Lisa Kudrow	The Opposite of Sex	Lucia DeLury
1998	Joely Richardson	Under Heaven	Eleanor Dunston
1999	Chloë Sevigny	Boys Don't Cry	Lana Tisdel
1999	Barbara Barrie	Judy Berlin	Sue Berlin
1999	Vanessa Martinez	Limbo	Noelle De Angelo
1999	Sarah Polley	Go	Ronna Martin
1999	Jean Smart	Guinevere	Deborah Sloane

=== 2000s ===
Year	Actress	Film	Role
2000	Zhang Ziyi	Crouching Tiger, Hidden Dragon	Jen Yu
2000	Pat Carroll	Songcatcher	Viney Butler
2000	Jennifer Connelly	Requiem for a Dream	Marion Silver
2000	Marcia Gay Harden	Pollock	Lee Krasner
2000	Lupe Ontiveros	Chuck & Buck	Beverly Franco
2001	Carrie-Anne Moss	Memento	Natalie
2001	Davenia McFadden	Stranger Inside	Brownie
2001	Summer Phoenix	The Believer	Carla Moebius
2001	Uma Thurman	Tape	Amy Randall
2001	Tamara Tunie	The Caveman's Valentine	Sheila Ledbetter
2002	Emily Mortimer	Lovely & Amazing	Elizabeth Marks
2002	Viola Davis	Antwone Fisher	Eva May
2002	Jacqueline Kim	Charlotte Sometimes	Darcy / Charlotte
2002	Juliette Lewis	Hysterical Blindness	Beth Tocyznski
2002	Julianne Nicholson	Tully	Ella Smalley
2003	Shohreh Aghdashloo	House of Sand and Fog	Nadi Behrani
2003	Sarah Bolger	In America	Christy Sullivan
2003	Patricia Clarkson	Pieces of April	Joy Burns
2003	Hope Davis	The Secret Lives of Dentists	Dana Hurst
2003	Frances McDormand	Laurel Canyon	Jane
2004	Virginia Madsen	Sideways	Maya Randall
2004	Cate Blanchett	Coffee and Cigarettes	Cate / Shelly
2004	Loretta Devine	Woman Thou Art Loosed	Cassey Jordan
2004	Robin Simmons	Robbing Peter	Shawna
2004	Yenny Paola Vega	Maria Full of Grace	Blanca
2005	Amy Adams	Junebug	Ashley Johnsten
2005	Maggie Gyllenhaal	Happy Endings	Jude
2005	Allison Janney	Our Very Own	Joan Whitfield
2005	Michelle Williams	Brokeback Mountain	Alma Beers Del Mar
2005	Robin Wright	Nine Lives	Diana
2006	Frances McDormand	Friends with Money	Jane
2006	Melonie Diaz	A Guide to Recognizing Your Saints	Young Laurie
2006	Marcia Gay Harden	American Gun	Janet Huttenson
2006	Mary Beth Hurt	The Dead Girl	Ruth
2006	Amber Tamblyn	Stephanie Daley	Stephanie Daley
2007	Cate Blanchett	I'm Not There	Jude Quinn
2007	Anna Kendrick	Rocket Science	Ginny Ryerson
2007	Jennifer Jason Leigh	Margot at the Wedding	Pauline
2007	Tamara Podemski	Four Sheets to the Wind	Miri Smallhill
2007	Marisa Tomei	Before the Devil Knows You're Dead	Gina Hanson
2008	Penélope Cruz	Vicky Cristina Barcelona	María Elena
2008	Rosemarie DeWitt	Rachel Getting Married	Rachel Buchman
2008	Rosie Perez	The Take	Marina De La Pena
2008	Misty Upham	Frozen River	Lila Littlewolf
2008	Debra Winger	Rachel Getting Married	Abby Buchman
2009	Mo'Nique	Precious	Mary Lee Johnston
2009	Dina Korzun	Cold Souls	Nina
2009	Samantha Morton	The Messenger	Olivia Pitterson
2009	Natalie Press	Fifty Dead Men Walking	Lara
2009	Mia Wasikowska	That Evening Sun	Pamela Choat

=== 2010s ===
Year	Actress	Film	Role
2010	Dale Dickey	Winter's Bone	Merab
2010	Ashley Bell	The Last Exorcism	Nell Sweetzer
2010	Allison Janney	Life During Wartime	Trish
2010	Daphne Rubin-Vega	Jack Goes Boating	Lucy
2010	Naomi Watts	Mother and Child	Elizabeth
2011	Shailene Woodley	The Descendants	Alexandra "Alex" King
2011	Jessica Chastain	Take Shelter	Samantha LaForche
2011	Anjelica Huston	50/50	Diane Lerner
2011	Janet McTeer	Albert Nobbs	Hubert Page
2011	Harmony Santana	Gun Hill Road	Michael
2012	Helen Hunt	The Sessions	Cheryl Cohen-Greene
2012	Rosemarie DeWitt	Your Sister's Sister	Hannah
2012	Ann Dowd	Compliance	Sandra
2012	Brit Marling	Sound of My Voice	Maggie
2012	Lorraine Toussaint	Middle of Nowhere	Ruth
2013	Lupita Nyong'o	12 Years a Slave	Patsey
2013	Melonie Diaz	Fruitvale Station	Sophina
2013	Sally Hawkins	Blue Jasmine	Ginger
2013	Yolonda Ross	Go for Sisters	Fontayne
2013	June Squibb	Nebraska	Kate Grant
2014	Patricia Arquette	Boyhood	Olivia Evans
2014	Jessica Chastain	A Most Violent Year	Anna Morales
2014	Carmen Ejogo	Selma	Coretta Scott King
2014	Emma Stone	Birdman	Sam Thomson
2014	Andrea Suarez Paz	Stand Clear of the Closing Doors	Mariana
2015	Mya Taylor	Tangerine	Alexandra
2015	Robin Bartlett	H.	Helen
2015	Marin Ireland	Glass Chin	Ellen Doyle
2015	Jennifer Jason Leigh	Anomalisa	Lisa Hesselman
2015	Cynthia Nixon	James White	Gail White
2016	Molly Shannon	Other People	Joanne Mulcahey
2016	Edwina Findley	Free in Deed	Melva Neddy
2016	Paulina García	Little Men	Leonor Calvelli
2016	Lily Gladstone	Certain Women	Jamie
2016	Riley Keough	American Honey	Krystal
2017	Allison Janney	I, Tonya	LaVona Golden
2017	Holly Hunter	The Big Sick	Beth Gardner
2017	Laurie Metcalf	Lady Bird	Marion McPherson
2017	Lois Smith	Marjorie Prime	Marjorie Lancaster
2017	Taliah Lennice Webster	Good Time	Crystal
2018	Regina King	If Beale Street Could Talk	Sharon Rivers
2018	Kayli Carter	Private Life	Sadie Barrett
2018	Tyne Daly	A Bread Factory	Dorothea
2018	Thomasin McKenzie	Leave No Trace	Tom
2018	J. Smith-Cameron	Nancy	Ellen Lynch
2019	Zhao Shuzhen	The Farewell	Nai Nai
2019	Jennifer Lopez	Hustlers	Ramona Vega
2019	Taylor Russell	Waves	Emily Williams
2019	Lauren “Lolo” Spencer	Give Me Liberty	Tracy
2019	Octavia Spencer	Luce	Harriet Wilson

=== 2020s ===
Year	Actress	Film	Role
2020	Youn Yuh-jung	Minari	Soon-ja
2020	Alexis Chikaeze	Miss Juneteenth	Kai Jones
2020	Han Ye-ri	Minari	Monica Yi
2020	Valerie Mahaffey	French Exit	Mme. Reynard
2020	Talia Ryder	Never Rarely Sometimes Always	Skylar
2021	Ruth Negga	Passing	Clare Kendry
2021	Jessie Buckley	The Lost Daughter	Young Leda Caruso
2021	Amy Forsyth	The Novice	Jamie Brill
2021	Revika Anne Reustle	Pleasure	Joy
2021	Suzanna Son	Red Rocket	Strawberry

== Multiple nominees ==
3 nominations

- Allison Janney

2 nominations

- Cate Blanchett
- Jessica Chastain
- Patricia Clarkson
- Rosemarie DeWitt
- Melonie Diaz
- Marcia Gay Harden
- Anjelica Huston
- Jennifer Jason Leigh
- Jennifer Lopez
- Amy Madigan
- Frances McDormand
- Chloë Sevigny
- Lili Taylor
- Mare Winningham

== See also ==
- Academy Award for Best Supporting Actress
- BAFTA Award for Best Actress in a Supporting Role
- Critics' Choice Movie Award for Best Supporting Actress
- Golden Globe Award for Best Supporting Actress – Motion Picture
- Screen Actors Guild Award for Outstanding Performance by a Female Actor in a Supporting Role
