= Forty Shades of Blue =

2005 American romantic drama film

- Directed by: Ira Sachs
- Written by: Ira Sachs; Michael Rohatyn
- Produced by: Mary Bing; Margot Bridger; Jawal Nga; Ira Sachs
- Starring: Rip Torn; Dina Korzun; Darren E. Burrows
- Distributed by: First Look Studios
- Release dates: January 21, 2005 (Sundance); September 28, 2005 (US); June 30, 2006 (UK)
- Running time: 108 minutes
- Language: English
- Box office: $172,569

Forty Shades of Blue is a 2005 independent drama film directed by Ira Sachs. Starring Rip Torn, Dina Korzun, and Darren R. Burrows, the film follows a young Russian woman living in Memphis with an aging music producer who comes to question her life when his adult son comes to visit.

Sachs, who co-wrote the script with musician Michael Rohatyn, was inspired by the works of Ken Loach, including Kes, Family Life, and Looks and Smiles, as well as Satyajit Ray's Charulata. A native of Memphis, Sachs based the character of Alan on his father. The film was workshopped at the Sundance Institute's Writers and Filmmakers Lab and premiered at the 2005 Sundance Film Festival, where it won the Grand Jury Prize. It received a limited theatrical release on September 28, 2005.

== Plot ==
Laura, a young Russian woman, lives with the much older Alan James, a renowned rock 'n' roll producer in Memphis, Tennessee. Laura met Alan while working as a translator at a Moscow music conference. The couple share a young son, Sam. Alan is arrogant, a drunk and a womanizer, while Laura is seen as little more than a trophy wife. At an industry event, Laura is left waiting on him as he carouses with other women.

After drinking at a bar, Laura reluctantly accepts a car ride home from a guy who shows interest in her. When she gets home, the man invites himself in and comes onto her. Laura rejects him with a slap, causing the man to get rough with her. After knocking over a lamp, he regains his composure and apologizes, but Laura kicks him out of the house. The situation is watched from behind a door by Michael, Alan's adult son from a previous marriage who is visiting from Los Angeles.

The following day, Laura and Michael are set to have lunch with Alan, but he is running late. The two, who have never met before, engage in conversation as they wait on Alan. Michael reveals he saw Laura come home last night with another guy and implies she is unfaithful, insulting her. Later, Michael apologizes for his behavior and admits he took out his anger on her, which he says is the result of marital troubles with his pregnant wife. Laura tells Michael that he should confide in his dad about the news of the pregnancy, but he has an estranged relationship with Alan.

Over the next few days, Laura and Michael's initially awkward encounter is eased as they get to know one another. Laura, who dabbles in songwriting and is working on a song called "Forty Shades of Blue", learns Michael is a teacher and writer. Alan's treatment of Laura angers Michael, but she insists to him her life is a comfortable and satisfying one compared to her modest upbringing in Russia. Eventually, their friendship crosses a boundary and they share a kiss. Laura, Alan, and Michael go out to a club one night with a musician Alan works with. Michael attempts to ignite a relationship with Laura, but she rebuffs him. He proceeds to get drunk, and spotting the man who had earlier mistreated Laura, gets into an inebriated fight with him. Laura demands to Alan that they go home. She later gives in to her attraction to Michael and they have a one-night stand at a hotel.

Michael's wife arrives in Memphis for a celebration in Alan's honor. During a large outdoor party, Alan makes a toast to Laura. In the speech, he admits being his partner is not easy and proposes marriage to her. Afterwards, he and Laura share a dance. An anguished Michael goes up to the mic to congratulate his father, and in an awkward ramble, says that while Alan was never a great father to him, he is a good man. He then privately says something to Laura, but their interaction is noticed by Alan, who becomes suspicious.

Michael and his wife are about to depart for LA the next day. Before he can leave, Laura asks to speak to him alone. Alan, as well as Michael's wife, are both aware that something has happened between the two. Laura rebukes Michael about his indecisiveness and asks what he wants to do. He resents being questioned and says they must move on from their brief affair, before leaving with his wife in a taxi. Alan finds Laura lying despondent on their bed and does not say anything, but angrily knocks over a table.

Some time later, Alan and Laura are driving at night. Alan wants to make up for his philandering to her but begins to ramble nonchalantly about his business deals, while Laura starts to cry. Alan notices and offers to stop the car, but Laura refuses. He parks and Laura gets out, walking alone on the empty street. Alan honks his horn, but Laura ignores it and continues walking, with the question of whether she remains with Alan or leaves him left ambiguous.

== Cast ==
- Rip Torn as Alan James
- Dina Korzun as Laura
- Darren E. Burrows as Michael James
- Andrew Lawrence Henderson as Sam James
- J. Blackfoot as himself
- Red West as Duigan
- Elizabeth Morton as Cindy
- Jerry Chipman as Shel
- Stuart Greer as Tom Skolnick
- Charles 'Skip' Pitts as himself
- D'Army Bailey as Man (uncredited)

== Reception ==
On Rotten Tomatoes, Forty Shades of Blue has an approval rating of 60% based on 52 reviews. The website's critics consensus reads, "In its portrayal of a woman's awakening and disillusionment, Forty Shades of Blue is as nuanced as its title would suggest." On Metacritic, the film has a score of 74 out of 100 based on 16 critics' reviews, indicating "generally favorable reviews".

Todd McCarthy of Variety called the film "A naturalistic drama in which naturalism prevails at the expense of some needed drama". Dina Korzun's performance received critical acclaim, with Felicia Feaster of Creative Loafing writing "From all outside appearances, Laura is empty and cold, but Korzun assures us there is something profound and aching locked inside." Rip Torn was also praised, with Roger Ebert writing, "I despised the character of Alan James so sincerely that I had to haul back at one point to remind myself that, hey, I've met Rip Torn and he's a nice guy and he's only acting." Ruthe Stein of the San Francisco Chronicle wrote the film "intricately captures the high end of music society". Feaster added "the film suggests a marriage of Robert Altman's early work, with gallivanting but rich character studies, and the penetrating view of marriage and loneliness in Henrik Ibsen's A Doll's House". The New York Times critic A.O. Scott wrote, "Memphis itself takes on something of the dimensions of a character in the film, insinuating its history and personality into the story and giving it a rough, lived-in texture as well as a musical lilt that helps its sorrows go down a little easier -- at least for the audience."

The film won the Grand Jury Prize at the 2005 Sundance Film Festival.

In February 2010, Forty Shades of Blue was placed at #92 on the Best Films of the Aughts list by Slant Magazine.

== Notes ==
Awards
Preceded by Primer	Sundance Grand Jury Prize: U.S. Dramatic; 2005	Succeeded by Quinceañera
