= Jerry Chipman =

American actor (1941–2020)

- Born: Jerry Carl Chipman; March 16, 1941; Halls, Tennessee, US
- Died: July 2, 2020 (aged 79); Memphis, Tennessee, US
- Occupation(s): Actor, stage director, spokesman, executive
- Spouse: Emiliano Livellara

Jerry Carl Chipman (March 16, 1941 – August 2, 2020) was an American actor, stage director, spokesman, and non-profit executive. He worked at St. Jude Children's Research Hospital from 1971 until his retirement on June 29, 2012. As an actor, he was best known for his appearance in the film 21 Grams.

== Personal life ==
Chipman was born on March 16, 1941, to Carl D. Chipman and Nellie Knox Chipman in Halls, Tennessee. His family relocated to Memphis, Tennessee when he was a teenager. He attended Frayser High School. Later at the Memphis State University he earned a bachelor's degree in liberal arts, a double major in English and theater history, and a minor in journalism. On April 27, 2015, he married Emiliano Livellara. Chipman died on August 2, 2020, nine days after open-heart surgery.

== St. Jude Children's Research Hospital spokesman ==
Chipman joined St. Jude's Children's Research Hospital as a spokesman in 1971. He was initially the only person in the organization working on public relations, but he steadily built the staff and scope of the hospital's public relations and communication. Dr. William E. Evans, former CEO of the hospital, said "he played a great role in helping the public understand St. Jude's global leader position, and he also was a great liaison to the Memphis community." In 2009 his title was Vice President of Executive and Corporate Relationships, and in 2010 his title was Interim Senior Vice President of Public Relationships. He retired from the hospital on June 29, 2012, though he planned to continue directing and acting at Theatre Memphis.

== Theater career ==
Chipman immersed himself in local theater as soon as he was old enough to pursue his interest in the stage. He joined his first production at Memphis Little Theatre, where he acted alongside his former high school English teacher Florence Leffler. Later, he would serve as president of Theatre Memphis' board of directors, and hold interim roles during transitions in internal leadership. Throughout the years, he would play hundreds of roles and direct hundreds of productions at Theatre Memphis. He also worked on productions at Playhouse on the Square and Circuit Playhouse. From 2000, Chipman was a client of the Colors Talent Agency.

== Film acting ==
Year	Title	Role	Ref.
1993	The Firm	FBI Agent	
1994	Separated by Murder	Millard Blumfeld	
2003	21 Grams	Cristina's Father	
2005	Forty Shades of Blue	Shel	
2005	Act One	Howard Merchant	
2011	Moon Ring	Principal Meyer	
2014	Boulevard	Blyden	
2015	I Am Potential	Bill	
