= Dina Korzun =

Russian actress

- Дина Корзун
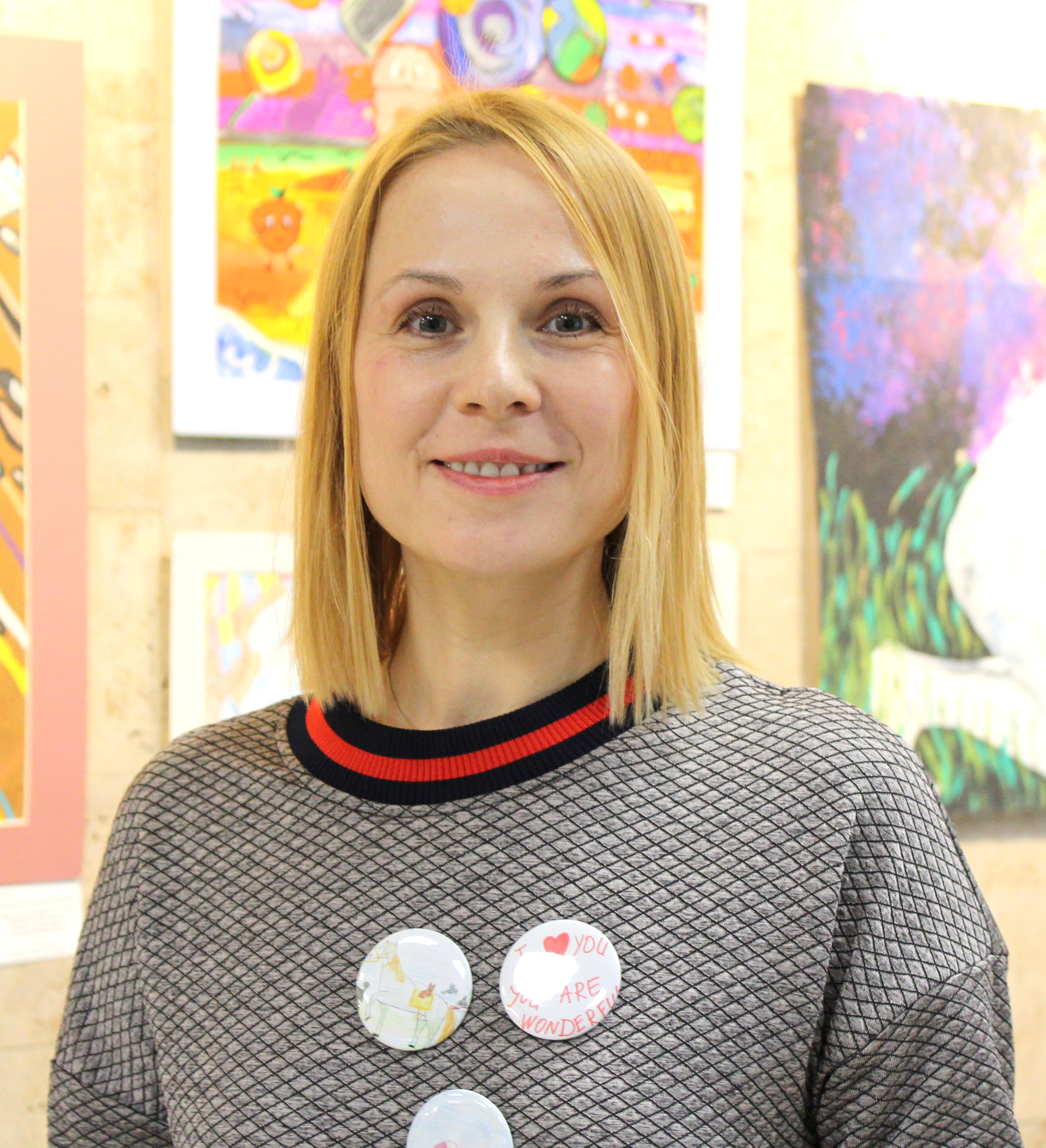
- Korzun in 2016
- Born: 13 April 1971 (age 55); Smolensk, RSFSR, USSR
- Occupations: Actress, artist
- Years active: 1994–present
- Awards: Nika Award - 1999; Russian Federation Presidential Certificate of Honour
- Website: Dina Korzun.com

Dianna "Dina" Aleksandrovna Korzun (Russian: Диа́нна (Ди́на) Алекса́ндровна Ко́рзун; born 13 April 1971) is a Russian actress.

== Life and career ==
Korzun was born on 13 April 1971 in Smolensk. She graduated from secondary school and art school, and studied ballet and modern dance. Following her graduation from the Moscow Art Theatre School, she was invited to join the Chekhov Moscow Art Theatre, where she performed as a stage actress from 1996 to 2000. Her major roles included Katerina in Storm, She in I Can't Imagine Tomorrow, and Helena in A Midsummer Night's Dream. Korzun made her screen debut in Valery Todorovsky's Country of the Deaf (1998), portraying Yaya, a young woman who is deaf and mentally ill.

Her other significant role is Tanya in Last Resort (2000) by Paweł Pawlikowski, for which she won the Best actress prize at the British Independent Film Awards (Best Newcomer on screen), London Film Festival (FIPRESCI Prize), Bratislava International Film Festival, Gijón International Film Festival, and Thessaloniki Film Festival.

In 2006, Korzun was nominated for the Best Female Lead at the Independent Spirit Award for her role in Forty Shades of Blue as Laura, a young Russian woman living in Memphis with a much older musician partner. In 2009, she was nominated for the Independent Spirit Award for Best Supporting Female for the movie Cold Souls.

In 2006, Korzun co-founded the Podari Zhizn charity foundation, which helps children suffering from oncological and hematological diseases.

== Personal life ==
Her first husband was Ansar Khalilullin. From this marriage, Korzun has a son, Timur Khalilullin (born 1990). Her second husband was Aleksei Zuyev, an actor. Since 2001, she has been married for the third time, to the Belgian musician and composer Louis Franck. The couple have two daughters: Itala (born 2008) and Sofia (born 2010).

She lived in London.

Korzun speaks Russian and English fluently and has acted in both of these languages.

== Recognition ==
She was recognized as one of the BBC's 100 women of 2013.

== Filmography ==
Year	Title	Role	Notes
1998	Country of the Deaf	Yaya	
2000	The President And His Granddaughter	Tanya	
2000	Citizen of the head	Larissa Lushnikova	TV series
2000	Last Resort	Tanya	
2002	The theory of binge	Svetik	
2002	Road	Anna	
2003	No matter how well	Marina	TV
2004	Marfa		
2005	Forty Shades of Blue	Laura	
2005	Female Novel	Zhenya	TV series
2007	Kuka	Lena	
2008	The Brothers Karamazov	Katerina Hohlakova	TV series
2008	The subscriber is temporarily unavailable	Lana	Mini-series
2009	Farewell	Alina	
2009	Mediator	Killers wife	
2009	Cold Souls	Nina	
2009	Russian cross	Maria	Mini-series
2012	After school	Zara, mother Frida, the artist	TV series
2013	It all started in Harbin	Matryona, mother of Boris and Volodya Eybozhenko	TV series
2014	Son		Mini-series
2016	Peaky Blinders	Grand Duchess Izabella Petrovna	Series 3
