= Country of the Deaf =

1998 film directed by Valery Todorovsky

- Directed by: Valery Todorovsky
- Written by: Yuriy Korotkov; Renata Litvinova; Valery Todorovsky
- Produced by: Sergey Chliyants; Sergey Livnev; Ilya Neretin
- Starring: Chulpan Khamatova; Dina Korzun
- Cinematography: Yuri Shajgardanov
- Music by: Alexey Aygi
- Release date: February 1998
- Running time: 105 minutes
- Country: Russia
- Languages: Russian; Sign language

Country of the Deaf (Russian: Страна глухих, romanized: Strana glukhikh) is a 1998 Russian crime film directed by Valery Todorovsky, loosely based on Renata Litvinova's novel To Own and Belong. The film set in a fictional underworld of deaf-mute people in Moscow. The film was entered into the 48th Berlin International Film Festival.

== Plot ==
Rita is going through a rough time as her boyfriend, Alyosha, a compulsive roulette player, has accumulated a massive debt, putting both their lives at risk. During a tense meeting with his creditor at a restaurant, Alyosha suddenly disappears, leaving Rita alone to face the creditor. While leaving, she crosses paths with Yaya, a deaf dancer at the restaurant, who helps her escape. Despite being deaf, Yaya understands hearing people well and convinces Rita to move on from Alyosha, asserting that all men are selfish and encouraging her to live only for herself.

The two women become inseparable, with Yaya teaching Rita sign language and sharing her dream of amassing enough money to move to the "Country of the Deaf", where people like her can live freely without limitations. Rita, at first skeptical, warms up to the idea. They attempt to earn money through prostitution but fail, leading Yaya to introduce Rita to Pig, the leader of a deaf gang, who offers Rita a job as his "ears", posing as his wife to help him avoid danger. However, when Rita reunites with Alyosha, their friendship faces tension. Yaya eventually tries to warn Rita about Alyosha's selfishness, but Rita remains loyal. Following a fallout, Rita returns to Alyosha, only for him to squander her savings and abandon her. Yaya then approaches the creditor, begging him to punish Alyosha but spare Rita. In a final showdown between deaf and hearing gangs, all the gang members perish, leaving only Yaya and a now partially deafened Rita. Realizing they are bound together forever, the two women walk into the distance, finding solace in their friendship.

== Cast ==
- Chulpan Khamatova as Rita
- Dina Korzun as Yaya
- Maksim Sukhanov as Svinya
- Nikita Tyunin as Alyosha (voiced by Sergei Bezrukov)
- Aleksandr Yatsko as The Albino
- Alexey Gorbunov as Landlord
- Pavel Pajmalov as Mao
- Sergey Yushkevich as Nuna
- Alexey Diakov as Molodoy
- Yaroslav Boyko as bandit

== Awards ==
At the 1998 Russian Guild of Film Critics Awards the film was awarded the prizes for Best Film, Best Music (Alexey Aygi), Best Female Actor (Dina Korzun), Best Supporting Actor (Maksim Sukhanov). At the Nika Award the film received the prizes for Best Female Actor (Dina Korzun) and Best Sound Design (Gleb Kravetsky).

== See also ==
- List of films featuring the deaf and hard of hearing
