= Little Men (2016 film) =

2016 film

- Theatrical release poster
- Directed by: Ira Sachs
- Written by: Ira Sachs; Mauricio Zacharias
- Produced by: Lucas Joaquin; Christos V. Konstantakopoulos; Jim Lande; Ira Sachs; L. A. Teodosio
- Starring: Greg Kinnear; Jennifer Ehle
- Cinematography: Óscar Durán
- Edited by: Mollie Goldstein; Affonso Gonçalves
- Music by: Dickon Hinchliffe
- Production companies: Buffalo 8; Race Point Films; Faliro House Productions; Charlie Guidance Productions; Parts & Labor; Raptor Films; Water's End Productions; RT Features
- Distributed by: Magnolia Pictures
- Release dates: January 25, 2016 (Sundance); August 5, 2016 (US)
- Running time: 85 minutes
- Countries: United States; Greece
- Language: English
- Budget: $2 million
- Box office: $2 million

Little Men is a 2016 American drama film directed by Ira Sachs. It had its world premiere at the 2016 Sundance Film Festival and had its European premiere as a cross-section selection in the Generations and Panorama sections at the 66th Berlin International Film Festival.

== Plot ==
After his elderly father dies, Brian Jardine moves his wife Kathy and 13-year-old son Jake into a Brooklyn apartment that they have inherited. The two-story building has a tenant in the ground-level space; a dress shop run by Leonor Calvelli and her 13-year-old son Tony. Jake and Tony become fast friends despite having very different personalities. Jake is quiet and reserved and spends much of his time sketching or painting, whereas Tony is talkative and gregarious. Tony is an aspiring actor who attends regular classes at Brooklyn's Acting Out! school and dreams of attending Fiorello H. LaGuardia High School to pursue a performing arts education. Jake decides he wants to attend the same school for his painting. The boys bond through everyday activities like skating around the borough, attending a teen rave, and giving their respective parents the silent treatment when disagreements occur. Tony even starts a fight with his classmates when they insult Jake's sexuality.

The Jardines discover that Brian's father has been charging Leonor an unusually small rent on her store. Since Brian's acting career is stagnant and the family is almost entirely supported by Kathy's work as a psychotherapist, they inform Leonor that her rent will need to be tripled, still placing it below market value for the changing neighborhood. Leonor makes emotional appeals to Brian, claiming that she and his father were close friends and that he would want Brian to be generous to her. Brian is reluctant to take direct legal action against Leonor, partly because he is simply glad his introverted son has finally made a friend. After receiving an ultimatum from his sister Audrey, he formally evicts Leonor and her son.

Jake is devastated and tearfully pleads Tony's case, but is made to face reality. Brian encourages Jake to return his focus to his art and his upcoming application to LaGuardia. Some time later, Jake accompanies a group of fellow art students on a museum visit and is surprised to see Tony and some of his classmates on a tour. Jake watches from across a large atrium as Tony walks away, then quietly rejoins his own group to work on another sketch.

== Cast ==
- Greg Kinnear as Brian Jardine
- Paulina García as Leonor Calvelli
- Jennifer Ehle as Kathy Jardine
- Theo Taplitz as Jake Jardine
- Michael Barbieri as Tony Calvelli
- Talia Balsam as Audrey
- Alfred Molina as Hernán
- Clare Foley as Sally
- Ching Valdes-Aran as Pilar

== Reception ==
=== Critical response ===
On the review aggregator Rotten Tomatoes, the film has an approval rating of 96% based on 137 reviews and an average rating of 8/10. The website's critical consensus reads, "Little Men takes a compassionate look at the ways in which adult problems impact childhood friendships — and offers another affecting New York drama from director Ira Sachs." On another aggregator, Metacritic, the film has a score of 86 out of 100 based on 37 critics, indicating "universal acclaim".

=== Awards and nominations ===
List of awards and nominations
Year	Award	Category	Recipient(s)	Result	Ref(s)
2016	2016 Indiewire Critics' Poll	Best Overlooked Film	"Little Men"	7th Place	
2017	32nd Independent Spirit Awards	Best Supporting Female	Paulina Garcia	Nominated	
2017	32nd Independent Spirit Awards	Best Screenplay	Ira Sachs and Mauricio Zacharias	Nominated	
