= Blindfire =

- Directed by: Michael Nell
- Written by: Michael Nell
- Produced by: Howard Barish
- Starring: Brian Geraghty; Sharon Leal; Bethany Joy Lenz; Edwina Findley; Chiké Okonkwo; Jim Beaver
- Cinematography: Halyna Hutchins
- Edited by: Meridith Sommers
- Music by: Katy Jarzebowski
- Production company: Kandoo Films
- Distributed by: Kandoo Releasing
- Release date: 13 November 2020
- Running time: 83 minutes
- Country: United States
- Language: English

Blindfire is a 2020 American crime thriller film directed by Michael Nell, starring Brian Geraghty, Sharon Leal, Bethany Joy Lenz, Edwina Findley, Chiké Okonkwo and Jim Beaver.

== Plot ==
Fictional story of a police officer who had just heard a girl scream, feels threatened by an Afro-American male with a jagged bottle, & shoots. The caucasion officer kills the tatooed man, & endures his own investagation and trepidations. Unexpected outcome ensues.

== Cast ==
- Brian Geraghty as Will Bishop
- Sharon Leal as Nika Wilkins
- Bethany Joy Lenz as Jan Bishop
- Edwina Findley as Rosie Hughes
- Chiké Okonkwo as Andrew Hughes
- Jim Beaver as Sergeant Ward
- Wayne Brady as Javon
- Sam Ashe Arnold as Chase
- Tom Virtue as Mr. Smith
- Kevin A. Ross as Judge Ross
- Charlie Robinson as Albert Hughes
- Yvette Freeman as Gayle Hughes
- Nefetari Spencer as Maria
- Genesis White as Lucy
- Desi Williams as Alison Wade
- Cedric Begley as Mark
- Isaiah Frizzelle as Officer Mayo

== Reception ==
Michael Talbot-Haynes of Film Threat gave the film a score of 8/10 and called it a "tight thriller, effectively balancing the intense action with truly affecting dramatic moments."

Tom Meek of Cambridge Day rated the film 2.5 out of 4 stars and wrote: "Blue-on-Black violence gets put under the microscope here, shining a light on some of the nuances, municipal shenanigans and complications of deadly police response and the tangled process of justice."

Lapacanzo Sandoval of the New York Amsterdam News wrote that the film "has high ambitions but a very weak story with performances that do nothing to help shape this film" and called it a "look into the dull, boring, uninspired life of the guilty cop with no revelations at all."
