= Rogue Agent (film) =

2022 British film by Adam Patterson and Declan Lawn

- Directed by: Adam Patterson; Declan Lawn
- Written by: Michael Bronner; Adam Patterson; Declan Lawn
- Based on: "Chasing Agent Freegard" by Michael Bronner
- Produced by: Michael Bronner; Kitty Kaletsky; Robert Taylor; Herbert L. Kloiber
- Starring: James Norton; Gemma Arterton; Shazad Latif; Marisa Abela; Edwina Findley; Julian Barratt
- Cinematography: Larry Smith
- Music by: Hannah Peel
- Production companies: Rabbit Track Pictures; Great Point Media; The Development Partnership; Night Train Media
- Distributed by: Netflix
- Release date: 27 July 2022
- Running time: 116 minutes
- Country: United Kingdom
- Language: English
- Budget: <$10 million
- Box office: $192,880

Rogue Agent is a 2022 British biographical mystery drama thriller film directed by Adam Patterson and Declan Lawn in their feature-length debut, from a screenplay the pair co-wrote with Michael Bronner based on the unpublished article "Chasing Agent Freegard" by Michael Bronner. James Norton portrays Robert Hendy-Freegard, a conman who tricked and convinced several people that he was an MI5 agent. Gemma Arterton also stars as the person who brought him down, with additional cast members including Shazad Latif, Marisa Abela, Edwina Findley and Julian Barratt.

The film was released in the United Kingdom on 27 July 2022 on Netflix.

== Plot ==
Robert poses as an MI-5 agent, and asks three people – Sophie, Mae and Ian – for assistance in capturing members of the IRA. After a few months of training, he suddenly wakes them in the middle of the night and drives them away saying they would have to leave their old lives behind, as their situation has been compromised.

A lawyer, Alice, meets a luxury car salesman, Robert Hansen, who seduces her. While they stay at her home, Alice notices a call to Robert's phone from a Sophie, but Robert picks it up saying it's his dad. Feeling suspicious, Alice hires a private investigator to check on his name, which brings up nothing. Alice confronts Robert about the lack of credit history under his name, when Robert confesses that his real last name is Freegard, and that he is an undercover MI-5 agent who supervises his employee Sophie.

Robert meets Alice's parents for lunch and tells them about starting a new business leasing cars. Although a bit unhappy at first, her parents finally approve of the entrepreneurship plans. Meanwhile, Robert tells Sophie that she has secured a position on the field officer training program. He then takes Sophie to a secluded place, gives her a phone for incoming calls only, and orders her to stay there until contacted.

The investigator comes back to Alice and tells her he has dug up some past court judgements against Robert – that he was stalking and harassing a Julie Harper. Alice calls Mrs. Harper and learns that Robert had asked Julie to borrow £20,000. When confronted again by Alice with new evidence, Robert claims Julie drank a lot and disappeared the night before the wedding.

Alice then gets a call from a man called Paul Jones who says he got her number from Julie Harper's mother, and that Robert kidnapped his daughter Sophie. Alice meets with Sophie's parents, who say she called them occasionally to inform them that she was safe, but they could tell that she was brainwashed, because she asked for her share of the inheritance – £300,000 – only to promptly disappear again.

One day, Alice wakes up to find Robert gone, and an email from her bank saying their joint business account has been closed. The policeman assigned to the case, Sonny, is unable to tell if a crime has been committed since it was a joint account, but decides to investigate anyway. As soon as Robert receives a phone call from Sonny, he throws the phone into a lake. Sonny promises to check on Mae Hansen.

Robert is now with an American woman called Jenny Jackson, an academic in psychology. He again spins his story about being an MI-5 agent and asks her to join the organisation as an intelligence analyst. She tells him about her student loan of $80,000, which he suggests should be cleared before applying for her new job, hence she requests her parents to wire her that amount. While waiting for the money transfer, he throws her medications into the fire, making her ill. Her father calls to tell Robert that the money has been transferred.

Sonny and Alice meet with Mae, who now has two daughters from Robert. Alice tells Mae that Rob may be in danger due to his work, so they should try to warn him. Mae gives Alice a notebook containing some phone numbers. Sonny and Alice then visit the American embassy and hear about Jenny, who is now with Robert and has contacted her parents for money. They begin calling the numbers in the notebook taken from Mae's home, and Sophie answers. After locating her, they track Robert down to where is currently staying with Jenny.

Robert makes a final plea by telling Alice he still loves her, but tries to flee in his car, only to be stopped by Sophie ramming into it with another car. Robert is caught and sentenced, while Alice starts a new business leasing luxury cars.

== Cast ==
- James Norton as Robert Freegard
- Gemma Arterton as Alice Archer
- Marisa Abela as Sophie Jones
- Sarah Goldberg as Jenny Jackson
- Shazad Latif as Sonny Chandra
- Jimmy Akingbola as Andrew
- Freya Mavor as Mae Hansen
- Edwina Findley as Special Agent Sandy Harland
- Julian Barratt as Phil

== Production ==
On 22 January 2019, it was announced that James Norton would star in Chasing Agent Freegard, as one of three films produced between Great Point Media and The Development Partnership, with Norton producing through his own production company Rabbit Track Pictures. By June 2020, Adam Patterson and Declan Lawn were attached to co-direct the feature from a screenplay by Michael Bronner. In May 2021, it was reported that Night Train Media would also finance the film, then retitled Freegard, and that Gemma Arterton, Shazad Latif, Marisa Abela, Edwina Findley and Julian Barratt had joined the cast. Filming commenced in London on 31 May 2021. Filming took place at Dover Castle and Dover Lighthouse. That July, Sarah Goldberg, Jimmy Akingbola, Freya Mavor, Rob Malone, Philip Wright, Michael Fenton Stevens and Charlotte Avery were added to the cast. According to Variety Insight, the film's budget is less than $10 million. After six weeks, Lawn announced that principal photography had concluded on 12 July 2021. The film was later retitled again to Rogue Agent.

== Release ==
In the United Kingdom, the film was released on 27 July 2022 on Netflix. In the United States, the film was released in cinemas by IFC Films and on streaming on AMC+ on 12 August 2022.

== Reception ==
On the review aggregator website Rotten Tomatoes, the film received a 73% approval rating, based on 40 reviews, with an average rating of 6.5/10. The website's consensus reads, "Even if it isn't as engaging as the real-life story that inspired it, Rogue Agent remains a well-acted and appealingly twisty suspense thriller." On Metacritic, the film received a score of 61 out of 100, based on 11 reviews, indicating "generally favorable reviews".
