= Louis Franck =

Louis Franck or Frank may refer to:

- Louis Franck (politician), Belgian politician
- Louis Franck (ice hockey), Belgian ice hockey player
- Louis Franck, frontman of Ukrainian band Esthetic Education
- Louis Frank (lawyer), Belgian intellectual and activist for women's rights
