= Edwina Findley =

American actress

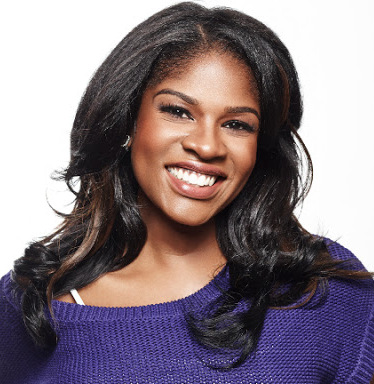
- Findley in 2014
- Born: Washington, D.C., U.S.
- Other names: Edwina Findley Dickerson
- Occupation: Actress
- Years active: 2003–present
- Spouse: Kelvin Dickerson (m. 2012)
- Children: 2
- Website: edwinafindley.com

Edwina Findley, also known as Edwina Findley Dickerson, is an American actress. Findley played recurring roles in the HBO television dramas The Wire (2003–04) and Treme (2010–13), and from 2014 to 2020 starred as Kelly Isaacs, one of the lead characters in the Oprah Winfrey Network drama series If Loving You Is Wrong.

Findley received an Independent Spirit Award for Best Supporting Female nomination for her performance in the 2015 drama film, Free in Deed. She also appeared in films Middle of Nowhere (2012), Insidious: Chapter 2 (2013), Get Hard (2015) and Rogue Agent (2022).

== Personal life ==
Findley was born in Washington, D.C., and attended Duke Ellington School of the Arts as a musical theater major. She graduated from New York University's Tisch School of the Arts in New York. In 2012, Findley married Kelvin Dickerson. She is a former roommate of actress Viola Davis.

== Career ==
She began her acting career in theatre appearing in plays Henry IV, Part 1 and Eclipsed. In 2003, she made her television debut in the recurring role of HBO drama series The Wire. She later guest-starred on Law & Order, Law & Order: Trial by Jury, Conviction, New Amsterdam, and had a recurring role in the ABC daytime soap opera, One Life to Live in 2005. In 2011, she also appeared as Jill in the fifth season of the ABC series, Brothers & Sisters. Findley had a recurring role of Davina Lambreaux in the HBO drama series, Treme, from 2010 to 2013. She co-starred opposite Emayatzy Corinealdi and Lorraine Toussaint in the 2012 independent film Middle of Nowhere written and directed by Ava DuVernay. She also appeared in Sympathetic Details (2008), Red Tails (2012) and Insidious: Chapter 2 (2013).

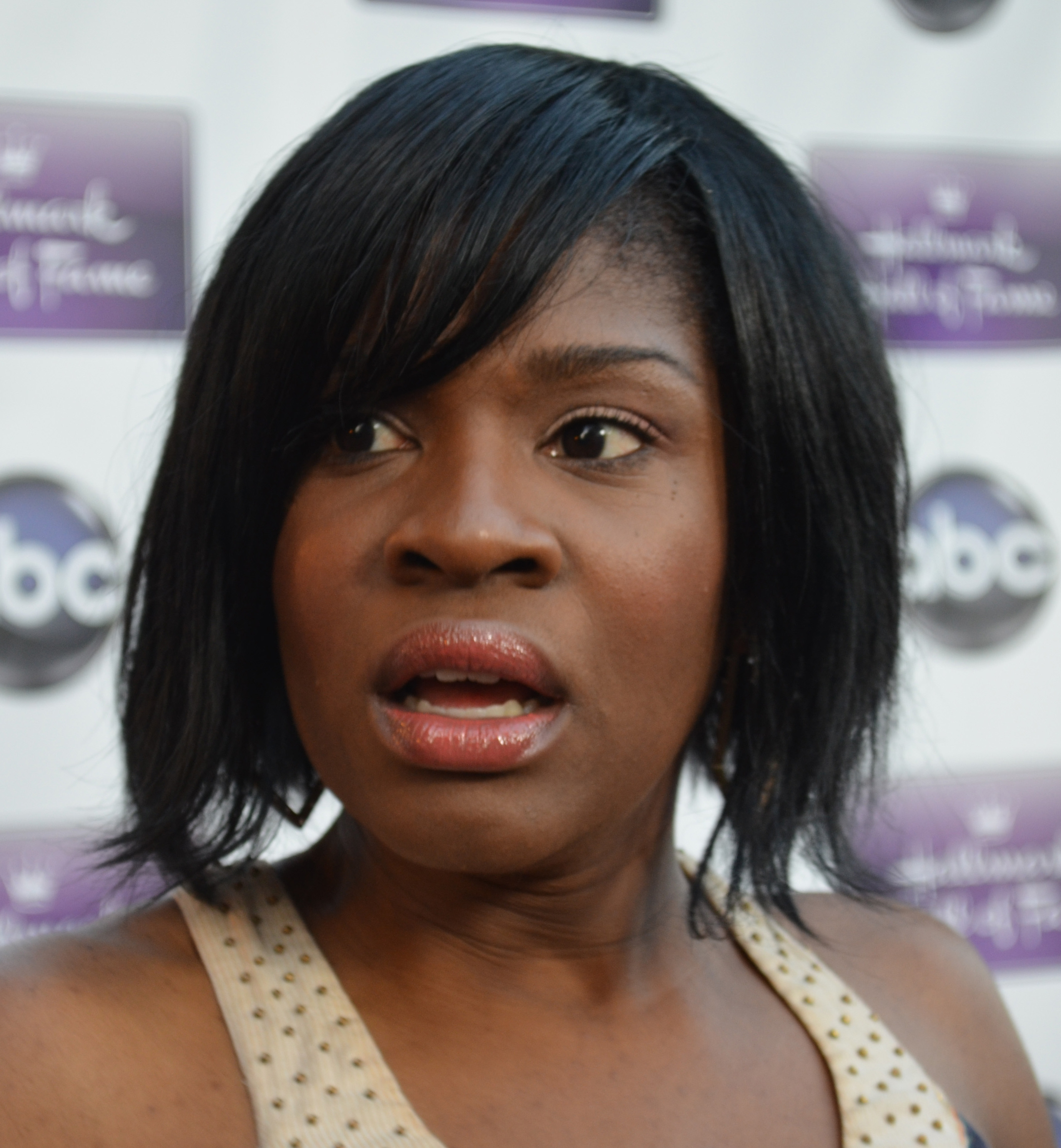
Findley at the Middle of Nowhere (2012) premiere

In 2014, she was cast as one of leads in the Oprah Winfrey Network prime time soap opera, If Loving You Is Wrong alongside Zulay Henao, Heather Hemmens, April Parker Jones, and Amanda Clayton. The series ended in 2020 after five seasons and 102 episodes. In 2015, Findley played the lead in the independent film Free in Deed, and Kevin Hart's character wife in Get Hard, a comedy film directed by Etan Cohen. In 2016, she was cast in the Fox event series Shots Fired starring Sanaa Lathan and created by Gina Prince-Bythewood. In 2017, she was cast in AMC's Fear the Walking Dead and The CW's superhero series Black Lightning playing Tori Whale. In 2019, she had a recurring role in the NBC medical drama, Chicago Med.

In 2019, Findley appeared in the drama film Goldie directed by Sam de Jong and starring Slick Woods, and the independent film Same Difference starring Essence Atkins. In 2020, she co-starred opposite Brian Geraghty in the crime drama film Blindfire. In 2022, she appeared in the biographical mystery drama Rogue Agent starring James Norton. In 2023, she starred in the Amazon Prime Video science fiction drama series, The Power. In 2023, she was cast as one of the leads in the Netflix murder-mystery series The Residence, produced by Shondaland and starring Uzo Aduba.

== Filmography ==
=== Film ===
Year	Title	Role	Notes
2008	Sympathetic Details	Mona	
2012	Red Tails	CeCe	Uncredited
2012	Middle of Nowhere	Rosie	Nominated – Black Reel Award for Best Ensemble
2013	Insidious: Chapter 2	Nurse Hillary	
2015	Get Hard	Rita Lewis	
2015	Free in Deed	Melva Neddy	Nominated – Independent Spirit Award for Best Supporting Female
2015	Where Children Play	Gayle Mccain	
2019	Goldie	Janet	
2019	Same Difference	Janice	
2020	Blindfire	Rosie	
2022	Rogue Agent	Special Agent Sandy Harland	

=== Television ===
Year	Title	Role	Notes
2003–2004	The Wire	Tosha Mitchell	Recurring role (seasons 2-3), 4 episodes
2005	N.Y.-70	Reggie 3's Widow	Unsold TV pilot
2005	One Life to Live	Nurse Messner	Recurring role, 4 episodes
2005	Law & Order: Trial by Jury	Kim Evans	Episode: "The Line" (1.09)
2005	Angel Rodriguez	Charlene	Television film
2006	Conviction	Tina Brock	Episode: "Denial" (1.02)
2006	Law & Order	Ali Hargis	Episode: "Public Service Homicide" (17.05)
2008	New Amsterdam	Tara Brown	Episode: "Keep the Change" (1.05)
2008	Blue Blood	Rory's Girlfriend	Unsold TV pilot
2009	Law & Order	Detective Jasmine Burton	Episode: "Anchors Away" (19.17)
2011	Brothers & Sisters	Jill	Recurring role (season 5), 4 episodes
2010–2013	Treme	Davina Lambreaux	Recurring role, 19 episodes
2014	Veep	Dee	Episode: "Alicia" (3.03)
2014–2020	If Loving You Is Wrong	Kelly	Series regular, 102 episodes
2016	Second Sight	Donna	Television film
2017	Shots Fired	Shirlane	Recurring role, 6 episodes
2017	Fear the Walking Dead	Diana	Special guest (season 3), 2 episodes
2018	Black Lightning	Tori Whale	Recurring role, 3 episodes
2019	Chicago Med	Sydney Hawkins	Recurring role, 3 episodes
2023	The Power	Helen	Series regular, 8 episodes
2025	The Residence	Sheila Cannon	Series regular
