= Ava Berkofsky =

American cinematographer and director

- Born: Wales, UK
- Education: School of Visual Arts (BFA); American Film Institute (MFA)
- Occupation: Cinematographer
- Years active: 2007–Present
- Known for: Insecure
- Notable work: Share; Vida; The Sky Is Everywhere

Ava Berkofsky is an American cinematographer and director. They are best known for their work on Insecure, for which they were nominated for three Primetime Emmy Awards. Berkofsky has been noted for their skill in lighting brown skin on camera.

== Career ==
Berkofsky was the director of photography for the films Free In Deed (2016) and the Starz series Vida.

Berkofsky was the principal cinematographer for HBO's Insecure from seasons two through five. They collaborated with executive producer Melina Matsoukas to develop the show's distinct visual style, which has some unique variation each season. The style frequently includes "short-siding characters and giving them lots of headroom to trap them in unbalanced frames." They also paid particular attention to framing to shoot Insecure.

They have been hailed for their uncommon skill in lighting the brown skin of Insecure's principal cast members. Berkofsky, who did not receive formal training on lighting non-white people in film school, uses techniques to control the levels of light throughout the shoot with tools such as LED-filled Litemats, glossy makeup on the actors, and a filter called a polarizer. The cinematography of Insecure's fifth season was reviewed by Vulture's Angelica Jade Bastién as "visually...a feast. Its graceful, sloping camerawork delights...The color scheme of cool blues, warm amber, and deep green enlivens the frame. Mirrors hold possibilities for your past to reach out to your present."

Berkofsky also directed one episode in each of the final two seasons of the show. For their work they were nominated for three Primetime Emmys for Outstanding Cinematography for a Single-Camera Series (Half-Hour).

They are the cinematographer for the Apple TV+ film The Sky is Everywhere. In 2021 they worked with Google to develop the Pixel 6 camera's ability to capture high-quality photos of brown skin.

== Personal life ==
Berkofsky was born in Wales, United Kingdom and was raised in California, spending part of their childhood in Los Angeles before later moving north. They received an MFA from the American Film Institute.

Berkofsky is queer. They are nonbinary and use they/them pronouns.

== Filmography ==
Cinematographer
Year	Title	Notes
2013	Flood Tide	
2015	Free in Deed	
2015	The Missing Girl	
2017–2021	Insecure	Seasons 2-5
2018	Cherries	Short film
2019	Vida	5 episodes
2019	How Does It Start	Short film
2019	Share	
2020	Grand Army	4 episodes
2020	On the Record	
2020	Woke	1 episode
2022	The Sky Is Everywhere	

Director
Year	Title	Notes
2020–2021	Insecure	2 episodes: "Lowkey Happy" (2020), "Pressure, Okay?!" (2021)
2022	Bel-Air	1 episode: "Payback's a B*tch"

== Awards and nominations ==
Year	Award	Category	Nominated work	Result	Ref.
2017	Independent Spirit Award	Best Cinematography	Free In Deed	Nominated	
2019	Primetime Emmy Awards	Outstanding Cinematography for a Single-Camera Series (Half-Hour)	Insecure (for "High-Like")	Nominated	
2020	Primetime Emmy Awards	Outstanding Cinematography for a Single-Camera Series (Half-Hour)	Insecure (for "Lowkey Lost")	Nominated	
2020	American Society of Cinematographers Awards	Outstanding Achievement in Cinematography in an Episode of a Half-Hour Television Series	Insecure (for "Lowkey Lost")	Nominated	
2022	Primetime Emmy Awards	Outstanding Cinematography for a Single-Camera Series (Half-Hour)	Insecure (for "Reunited, Okay?!")	Pending	
