= Independent Spirit Award for Best Screenplay =

American independent film award

- Awarded for: Best Screenplay
- Country: United States
- Presented by: Film Independent
- First award: 1985
- Currently held by: Eva Victor for Sorry, Baby (2025)
- Website: www.filmindependent.org

The Independent Spirit Award for Best Screenplay is one of the annual awards given out by Film Independent, a non-profit organization dedicated to independent film and independent filmmakers. It was first presented in 1985 with Horton Foote being the first winner of the awards for The Trip to Bountiful.

The category includes both original and adapted screenplays. Despite the creation of the Best First Screenplay category in 1994, first screenplays are also eligible to compete for this award.

Alexander Payne is the most awarded writer in the category with three wins, followed by Neal Jimenez, Gus Van Sant and Jim Taylor with two wins each. Sofia Coppola was the first female writer to win the award.

== Winners and nominees ==
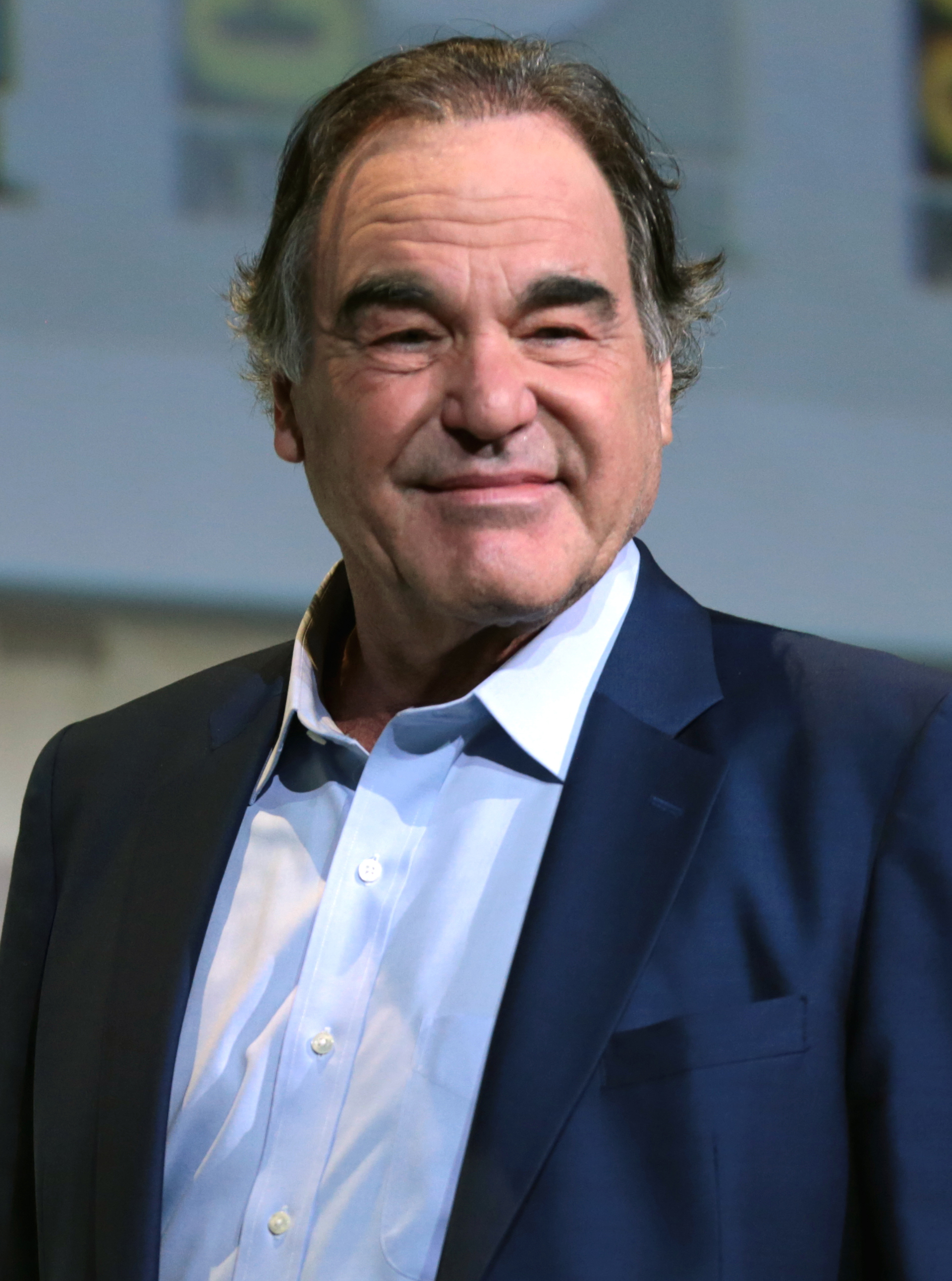
Oliver Stone won for Platoon.

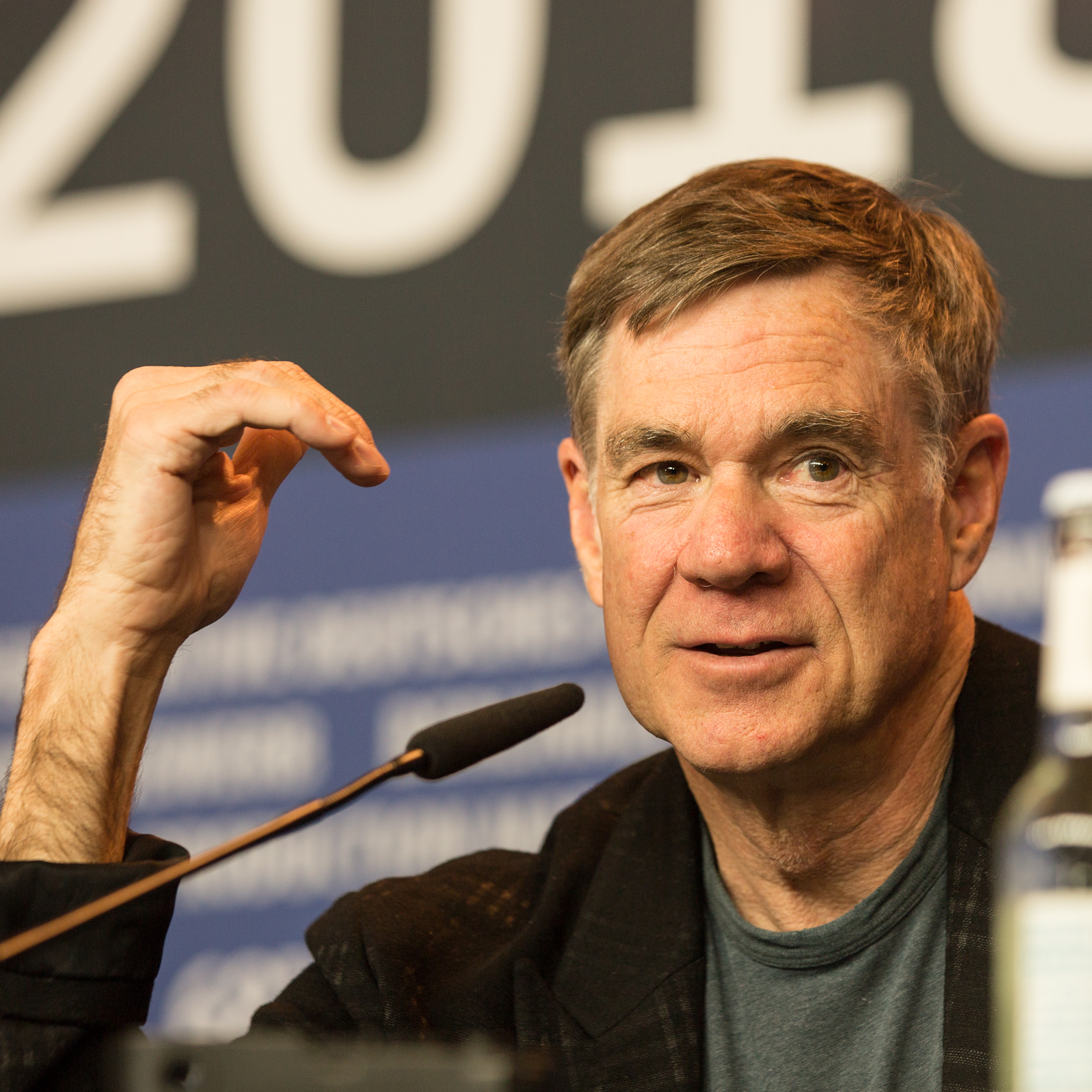
Gus Van Sant has won the award twice, for Drugstore Cowboy and My Own Private Idaho, the former with Daniel Yost.

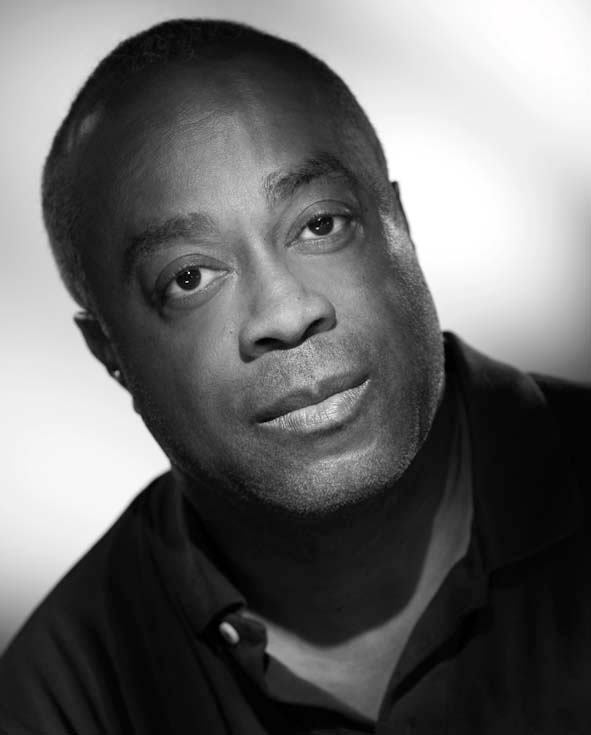
Charles Burnett won for To Sleep with Anger.

=== 1980s ===
Year	Film	Recipient(s)
1985	The Trip to Bountiful	Horton Foote
1985	After Hours	Joseph Minion
1985	Blood Simple	Joel Coen and Ethan Coen
1985	Smooth Talk	Tom Cole
1986	Platoon	Oliver Stone
1986	Blue Velvet	David Lynch
1986	A Great Wall	Peter Wang and Shirley Sun
1986	Salvador	Oliver Stone and Richard Boyle
1986	Stand by Me	Raynold Gideon and Bruce A. Evans
1987	River's Edge	Neal Jimenez
1987	Anna	Agnieszka Holland
1987	The Dead	Tony Huston
1987	Matewan	John Sayles
1987	Swimming to Cambodia	Spalding Gray
1988	Stand and Deliver	Ramón Menéndez and Tom Musca
1988	Five Corners	John Patrick Shanley
1988	Hairspray	John Waters
1988	The Moderns	Alan Rudolph and Jon Bradshaw
1988	Patti Rocks	John Jenkins, Karen Landry, David Burton Morris, and Chris Mulkey
1989	Drugstore Cowboy	Gus Van Sant and Daniel Yost
1989	84 Charlie Mopic	Patrick Sheane Duncan
1989	Heathers	Daniel Waters
1989	Miracle Mile	Steve De Jarnatt
1989	Mystery Train	Jim Jarmusch

=== 1990s ===
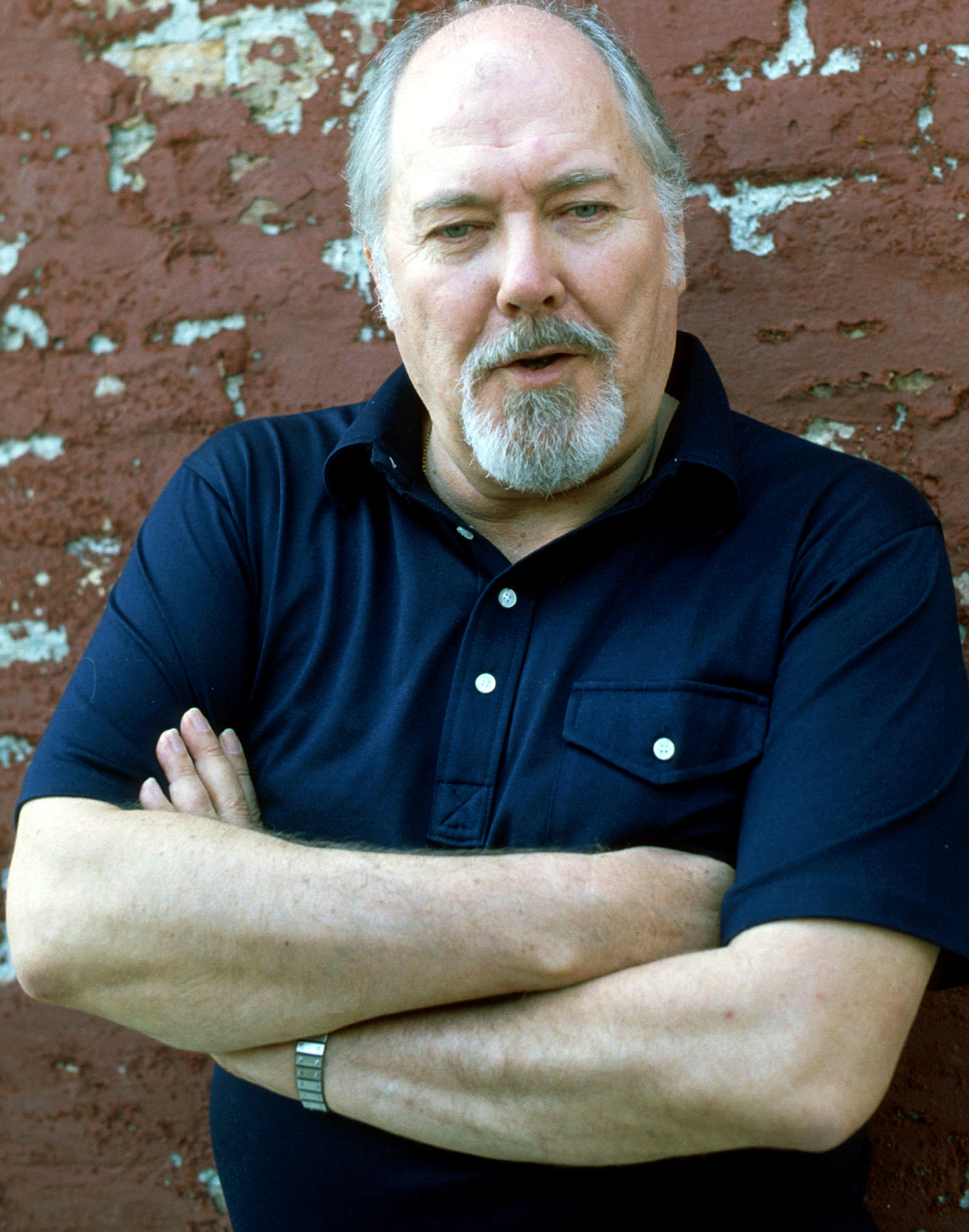
Robert Altman won for Shortcuts with Frank Barhydt.

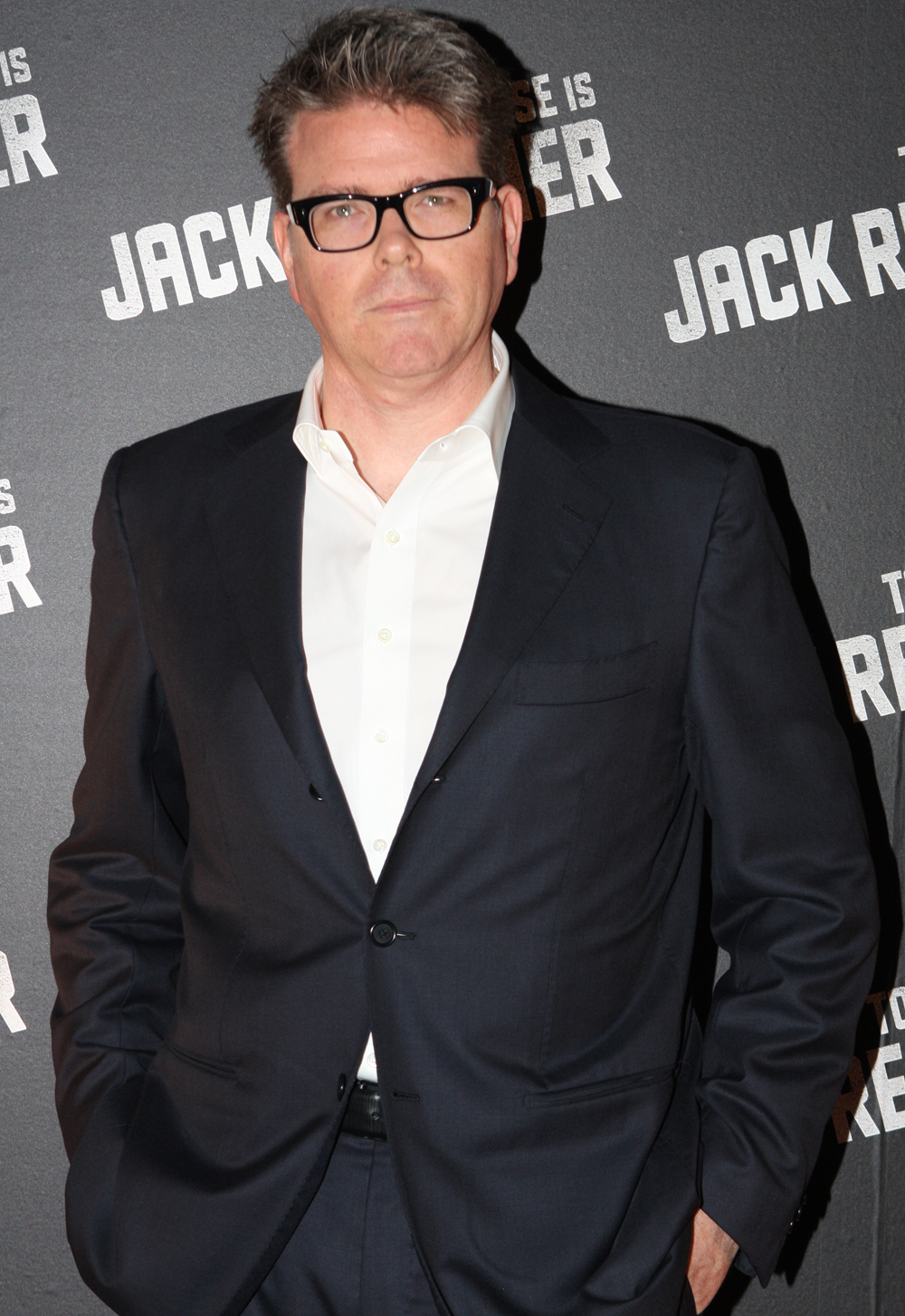
Christopher McQuarrie won for The Usual Suspects.

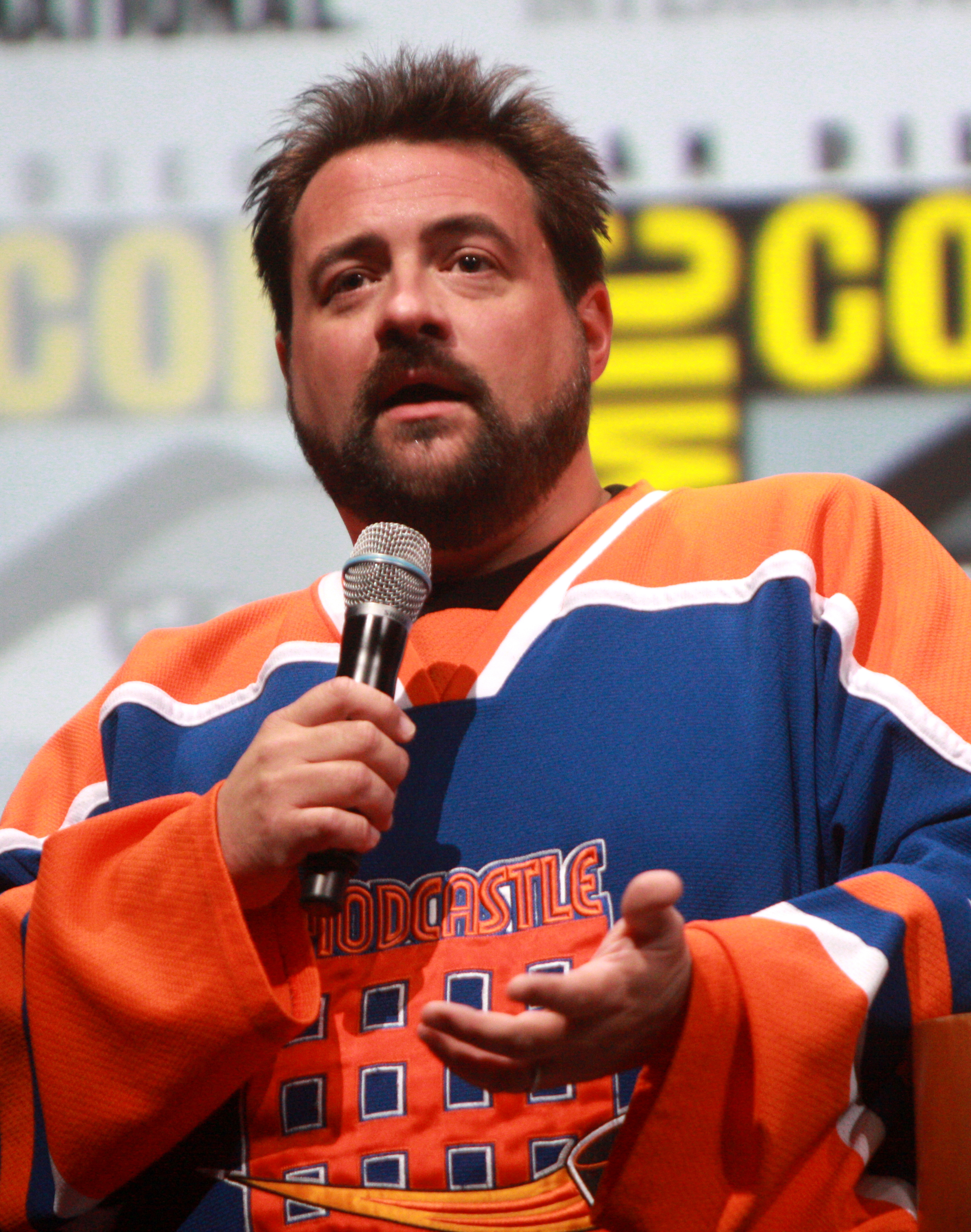
Kevin Smith won for Chasing Amy.

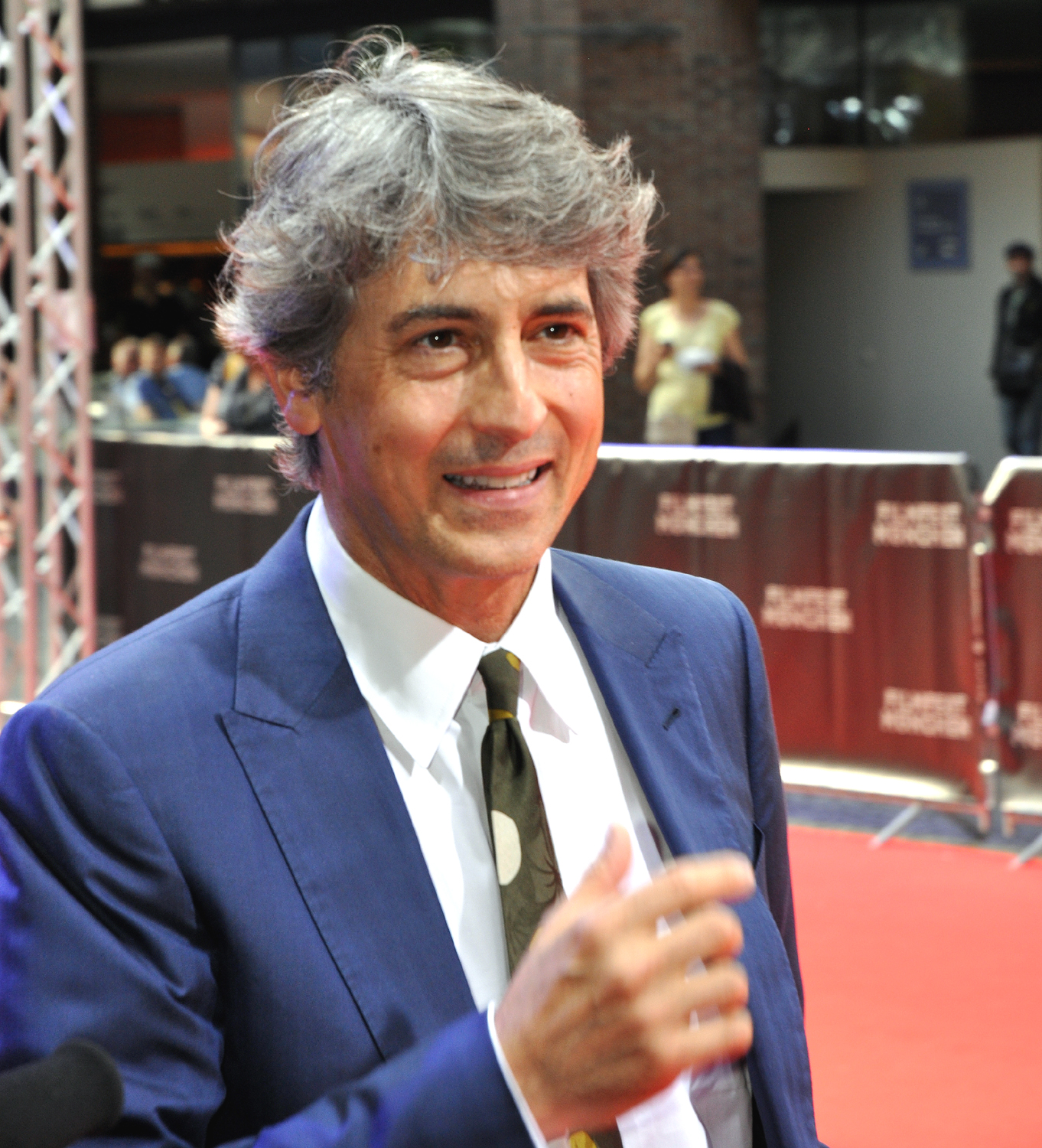
Alexander Payne has won this award thrice, for Election, Sideways and The Descendants, the former two with Jim Taylor and the latter with Nat Faxon and Jim Rash.

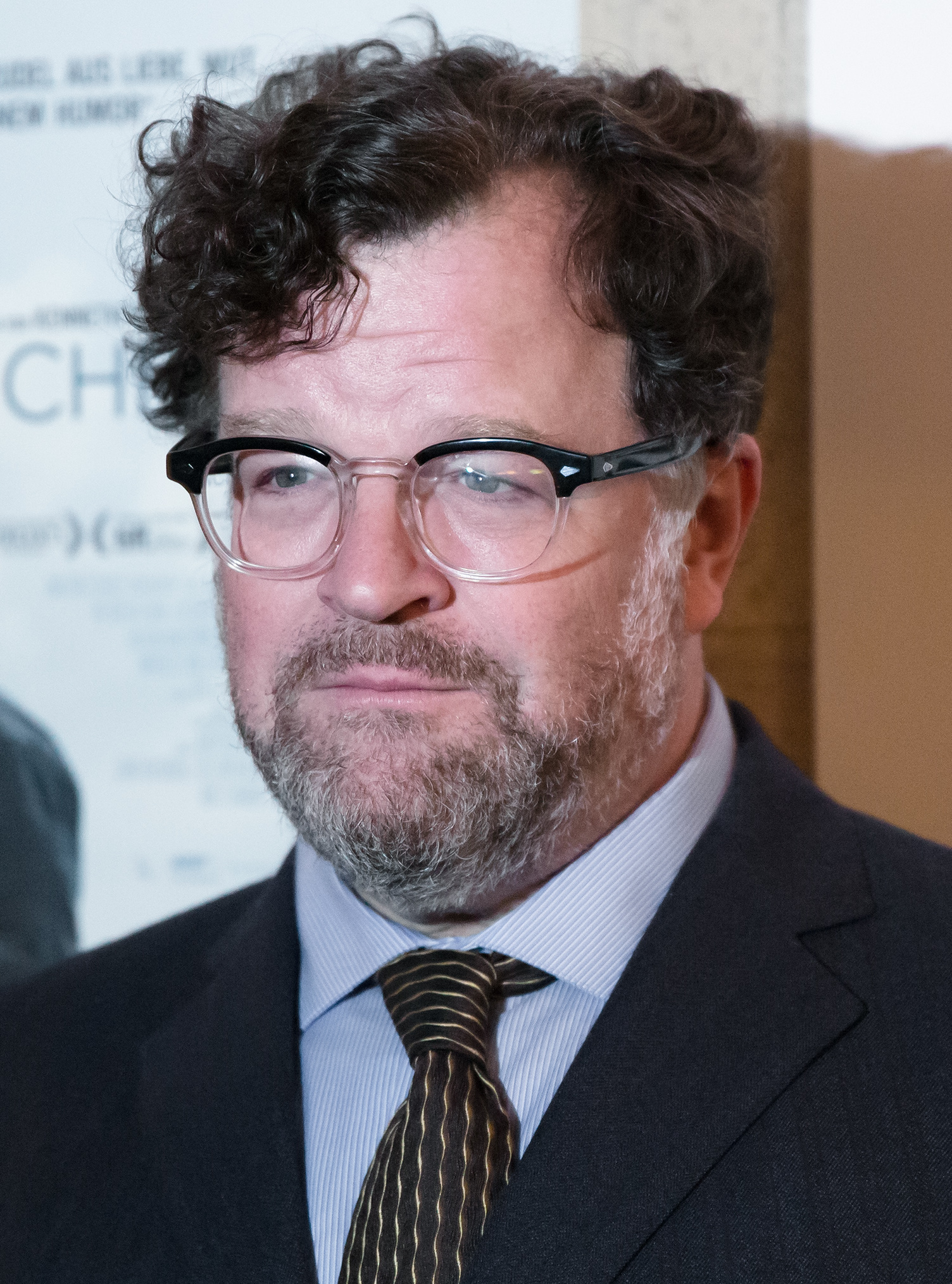
Kenneth Lonergan won for You Can Count on Me.

Year	Film	Recipient(s)
1990	To Sleep with Anger	Charles Burnett
1990	Henry: Portrait of a Serial Killer	John McNaughton and Richard Fire
1990	Metropolitan	Whit Stillman
1990	The Plot Against Harry	Michael Roemer
1990	Pump Up the Volume	Allan Moyle
1991	My Own Private Idaho	Gus Van Sant
1991	Hangin' with the Homeboys	Joseph Vásquez
1991	Kafka	Lem Dobbs
1991	Mindwalk	Floyd Byars and Fritjof Capra
1991	The Rapture	Michael Tolkin
1992	The Waterdance	Neal Jimenez
1992	Gas Food Lodging	Allison Anders
1992	Light Sleeper	Paul Schrader
1992	A Midnight Clear	Keith Gordon
1992	One False Move	Billy Bob Thornton and Tom Epperson
1993	Short Cuts	Robert Altman and Frank Barhydt
1993	Combination Platter	Edwin Baker and Tony Chan
1993	Household Saints	Nancy Savoca and Richard Guay
1993	Ruby in Paradise	Victor Nuñez
1993	The Wedding Banquet	Ang Lee, Neil Peng, and James Schamus
1994	Pulp Fiction	Quentin Tarantino and Roger Avary
1994	Bullets Over Broadway	Woody Allen and Douglas McGrath
1994	Eat Drink Man Woman	Hui-Ling Wang, James Schamus, and Ang Lee
1994	Mrs. Parker and the Vicious Circle	Alan Rudolph and Randy Sue Coburn
1994	Red Rock West	John Dahl and Rick Dahl
1995	The Usual Suspects	Christopher McQuarrie
1995	Leaving Las Vegas	Mike Figgis
1995	Living in Oblivion	Tom DiCillo
1995	Safe	Todd Haynes
1995	The Secret of Roan Inish	John Sayles
1996	Fargo	Joel Coen and Ethan Coen
1996	Dead Man	Jim Jarmusch
1996	Flirting with Disaster	David O. Russell
1996	The Funeral	Nicholas St. John
1996	Lone Star	John Sayles
1997	Chasing Amy	Kevin Smith
1997	The Apostle	Robert Duvall
1997	Touch	Paul Schrader
1997	Ulee's Gold	Victor Nuñez
1997	Waiting for Guffman	Christopher Guest and Eugene Levy
1998	The Opposite of Sex	Don Roos
1998	Affliction	Paul Schrader
1998	Blind Faith	Frank Military
1998	Gods and Monsters	Bill Condon
1998	The Spanish Prisoner	David Mamet
1999	Election	Alexander Payne and Jim Taylor
1999	Dogma	Kevin Smith
1999	Guinevere	Audrey Wells
1999	The Limey	Lem Dobbs
1999	SLC Punk!	James Merendino

=== 2000s ===
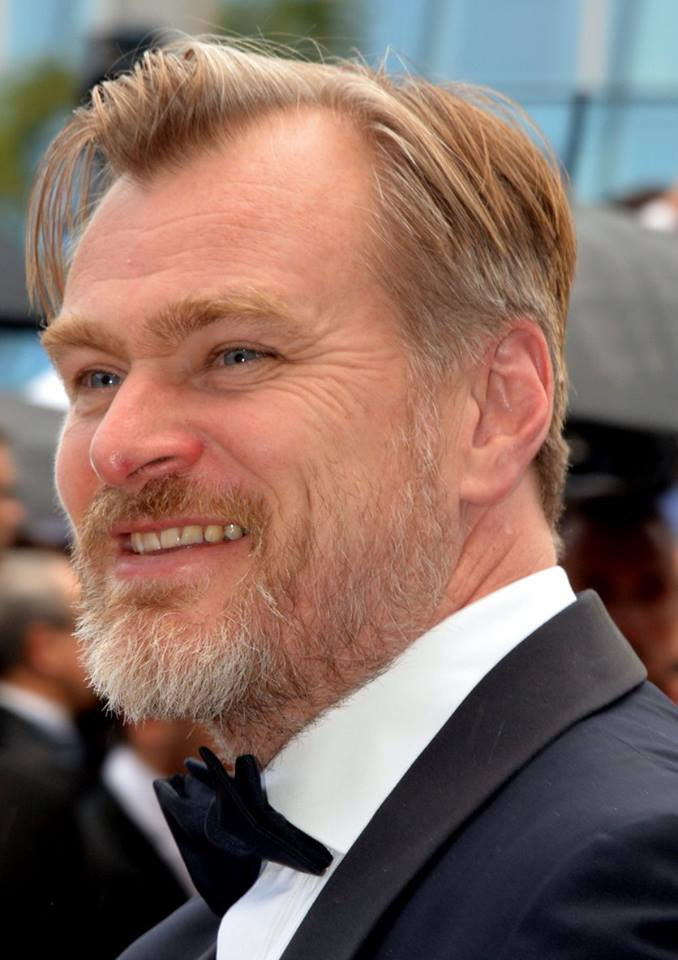
Christopher Nolan won for Memento.

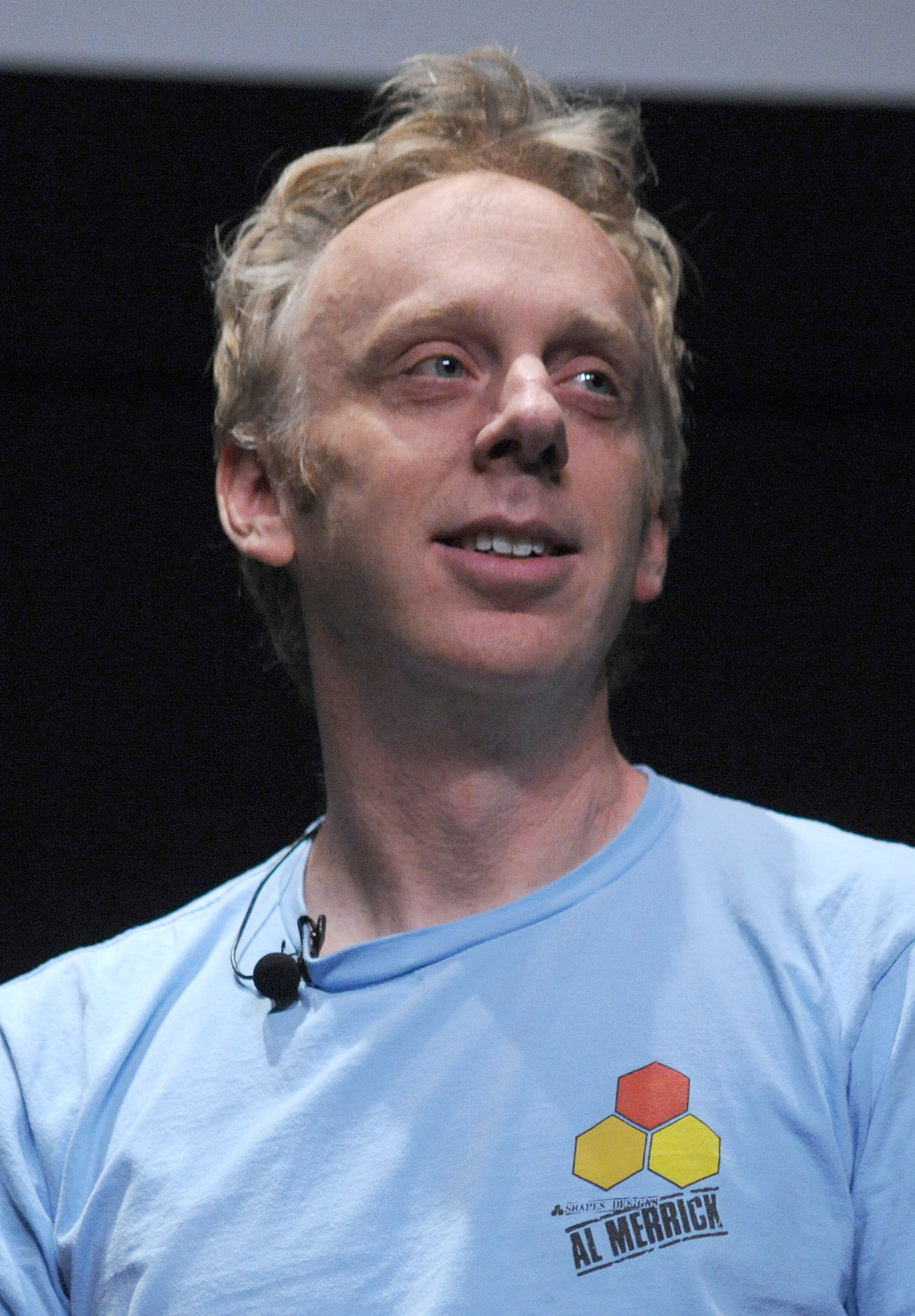
Mike White won for The Good Girl.

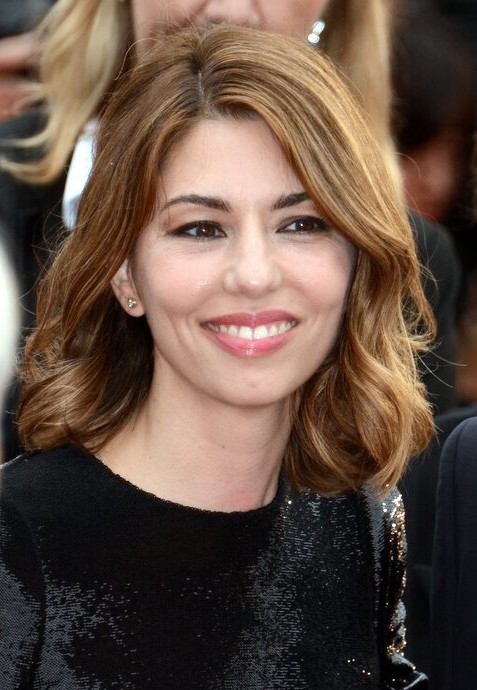
Sofia Coppola won for Lost in Translation.

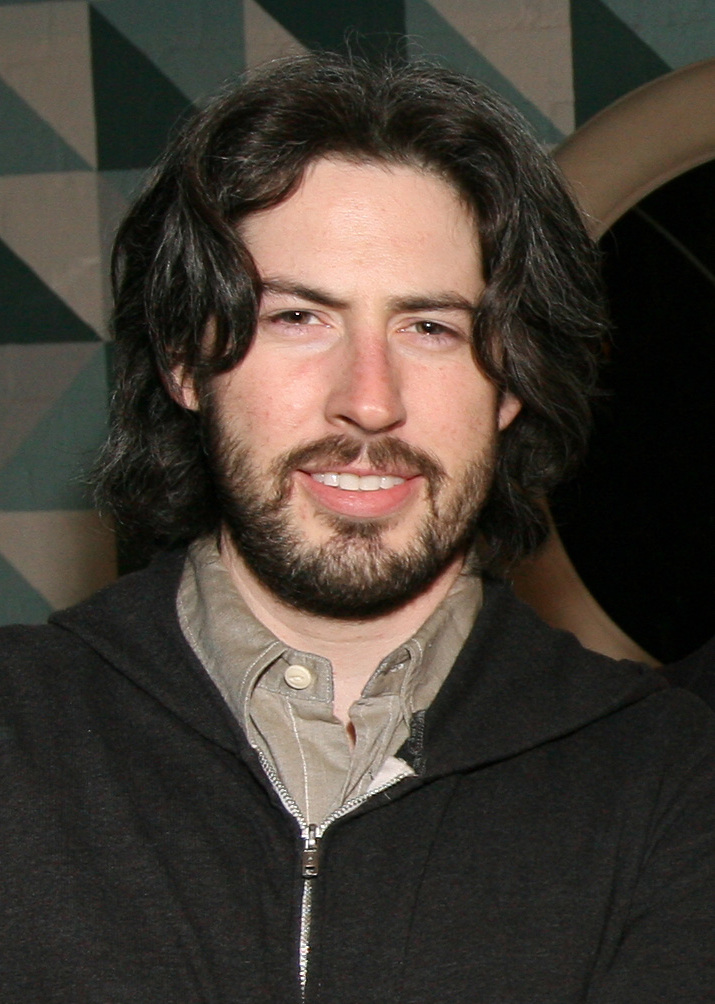
Jason Reitman won for Thank You for Smoking.

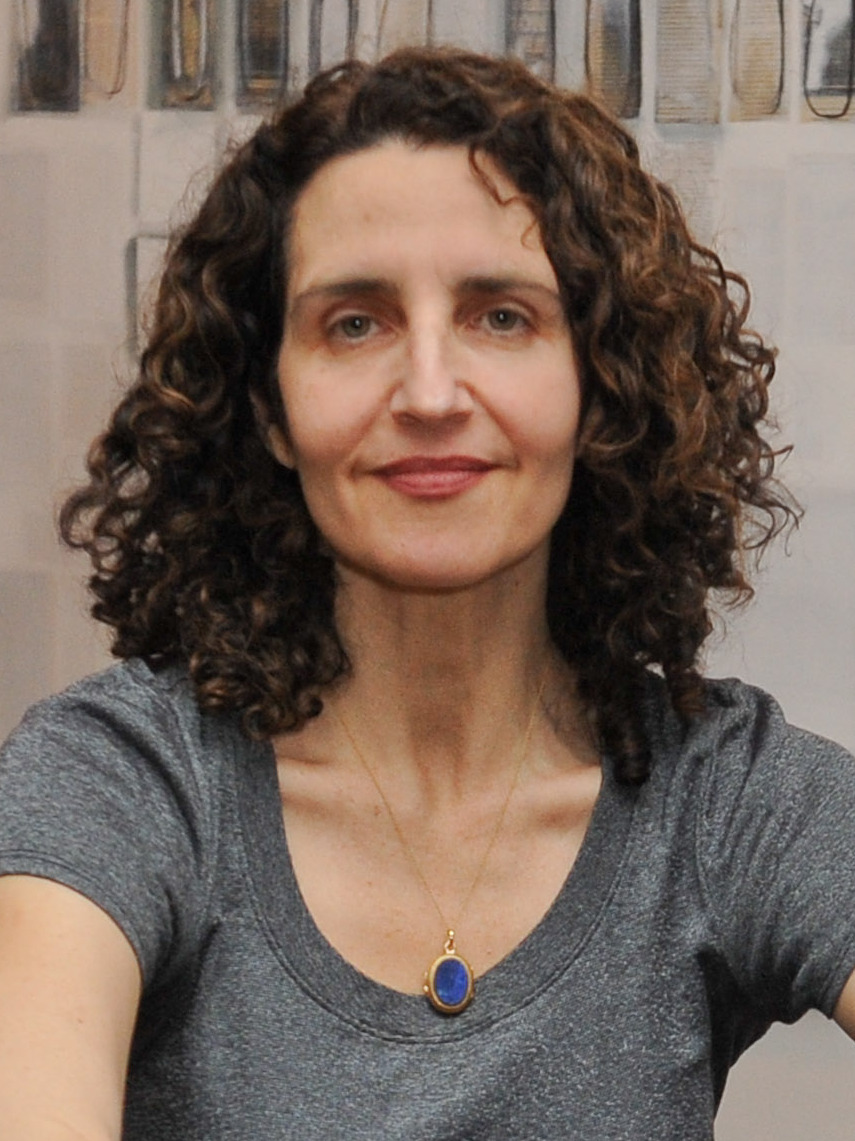
Tamara Jenkins won for The Savages.

Year	Film	Recipient(s)
2000	You Can Count on Me	Kenneth Lonergan
2000	Chuck & Buck	Mike White
2000	Love & Sex	Valerie Breiman
2000	Two Family House	Raymond De Felitta
2000	Waking the Dead	Robert Dillon
2001	Memento	Christopher Nolan
2001	The Believer	Henry Bean
2001	In the Bedroom	Robert Festinger and Todd Field
2001	Monster's Ball	Milo Addica and Will Rokos
2001	Waking Life	Richard Linklater
2002	The Good Girl	Mike White
2002	Lovely & Amazing	Nicole Holofcener
2002	Roger Dodger	Dylan Kidd
2002	Thirteen Conversations About One Thing	Jill Sprecher and Karen Sprecher
2002	Tully	Hilary Birmingham and Matt Drake
2003	Lost in Translation	Sofia Coppola
2003	American Splendor	Shari Springer Berman and Robert Pulcini
2003	A Mighty Wind	Christopher Guest and Eugene Levy (...and the cast)
2003	Pieces of April	Peter Hedges
2003	Shattered Glass	Billy Ray
2004	Sideways	Alexander Payne and Jim Taylor
2004	Baadasssss!	Mario Van Peebles and Dennis Haggerty
2004	Before Sunset	Richard Linklater, Ethan Hawke, and Julie Delpy
2004	The Door in the Floor	Tod Williams
2004	Kinsey	Bill Condon
2005	Capote	Dan Futterman
2005	Nine Lives	Rodrigo García
2005	The Squid and the Whale	Noah Baumbach
2005	The Three Burials of Melquiades Estrada	Guillermo Arriaga
2005	The War Within	Ayad Akhtar, Joseph Castelo, and Tom Glynn
2006	Thank You for Smoking	Jason Reitman
2006	Friends with Money	Nicole Holofcener
2006	The Illusionist	Neil Burger
2006	The Painted Veil	Ron Nyswaner
2006	Sorry, Haters	Jeff Stanzler
2007	The Savages	Tamara Jenkins
2007	The Diving Bell and the Butterfly	Ronald Harwood
2007	Starting Out in the Evening	Fred Parnes and Andrew Wagner
2007	Waitress	Adrienne Shelly
2007	Year of the Dog	Mike White
2008	Vicky Cristina Barcelona	Woody Allen
2008	Sangre de Mi Sangre	Christopher Zalla
2008	Savage Grace	Howard A. Rodman
2008	Sugar	Anna Boden and Ryan Fleck
2008	Synecdoche, New York	Charlie Kaufman
2009	(500) Days of Summer	Scott Neustadter and Michael H. Weber
2009	Adventureland	Greg Mottola
2009	The Last Station	Michael Hoffman
2009	The Messenger	Alessandro Camon and Oren Moverman
2009	The Vicious Kind	Lee Toland Krieger

=== 2010s ===
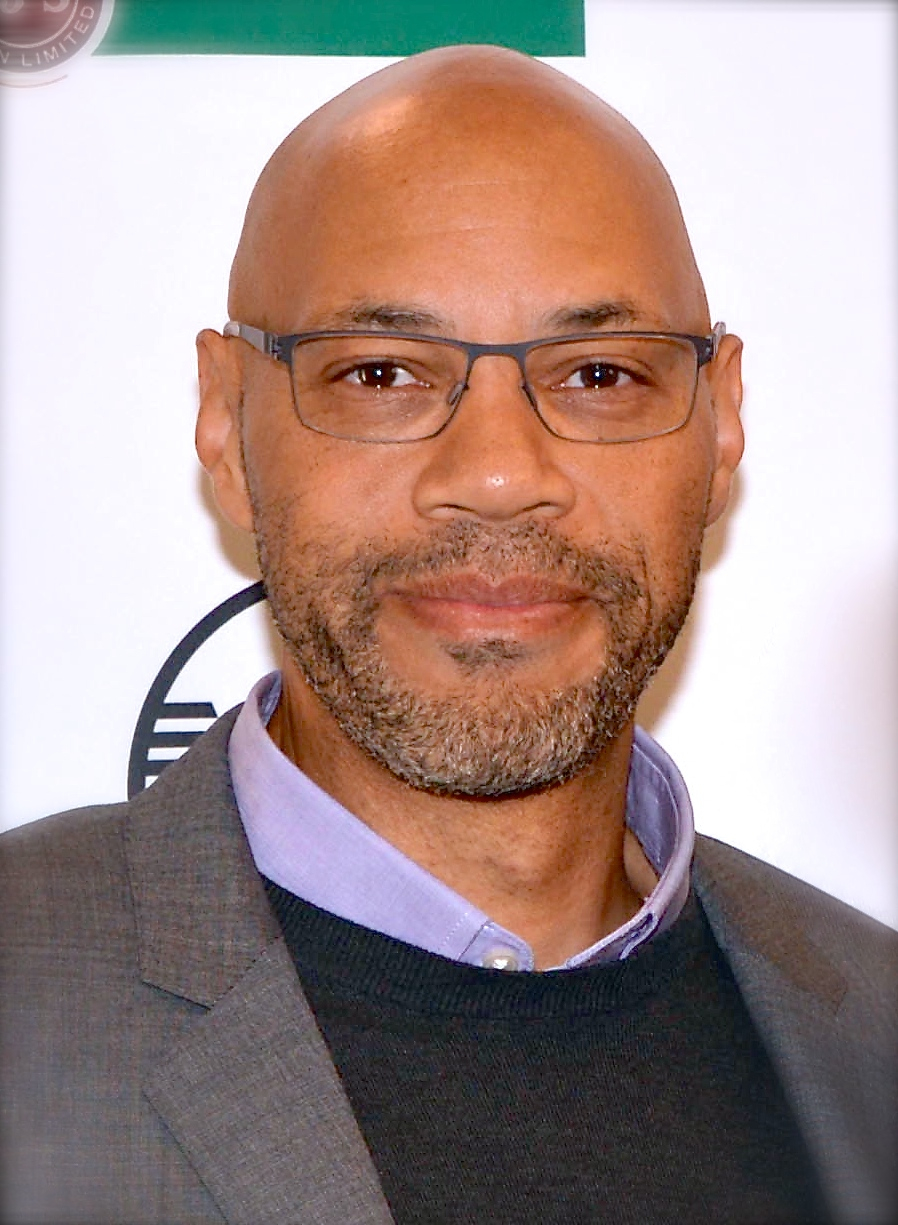
John Ridley won for 12 Years a Slave.

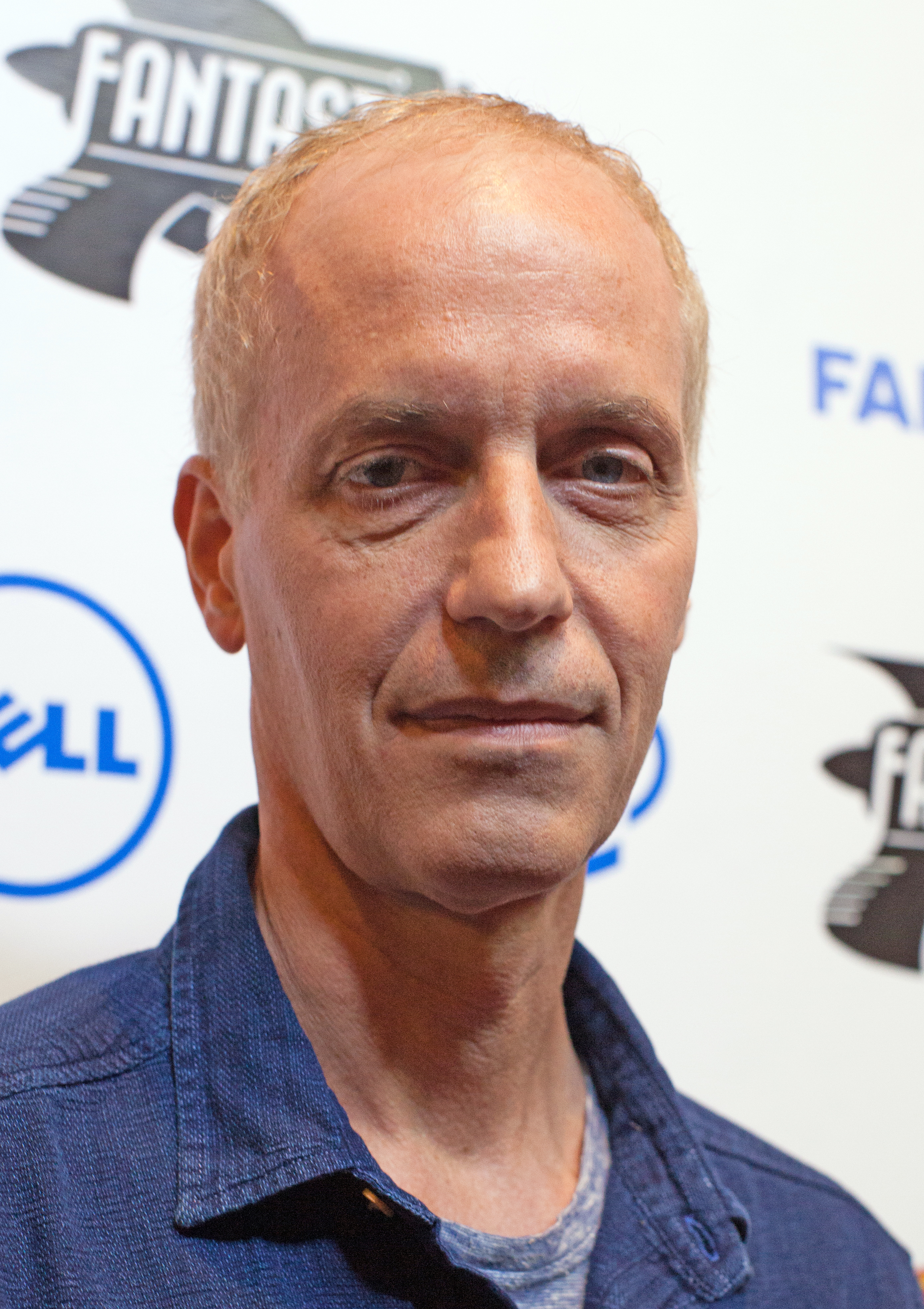
Dan Gilroy won for Nightcrawler.

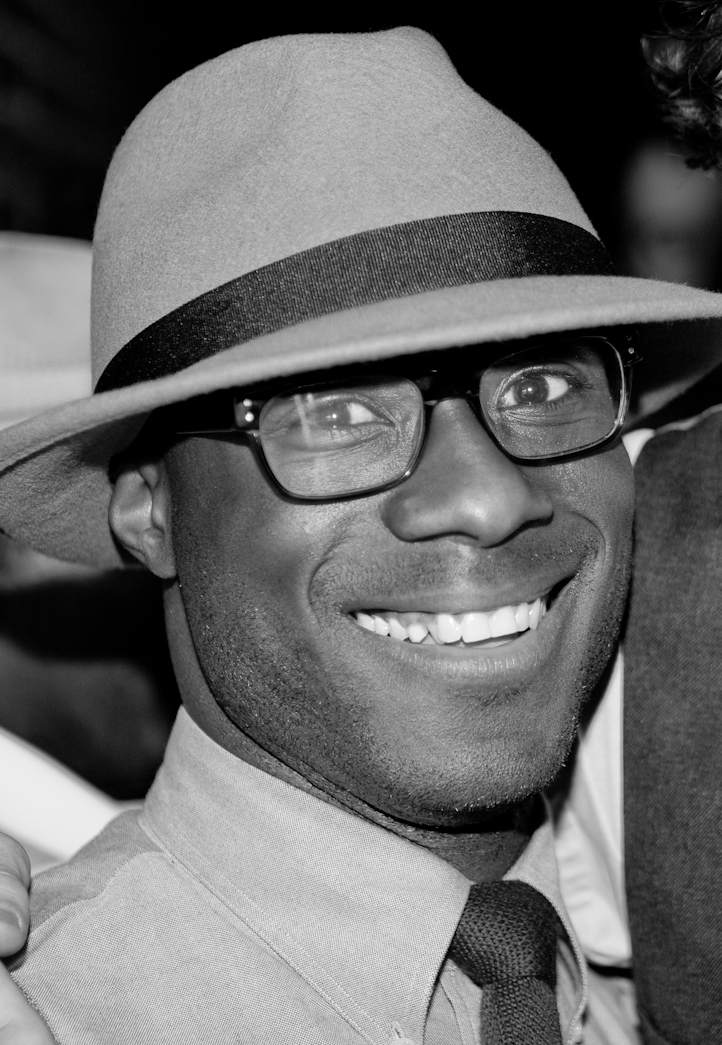
Barry Jenkins won for Moonlight.

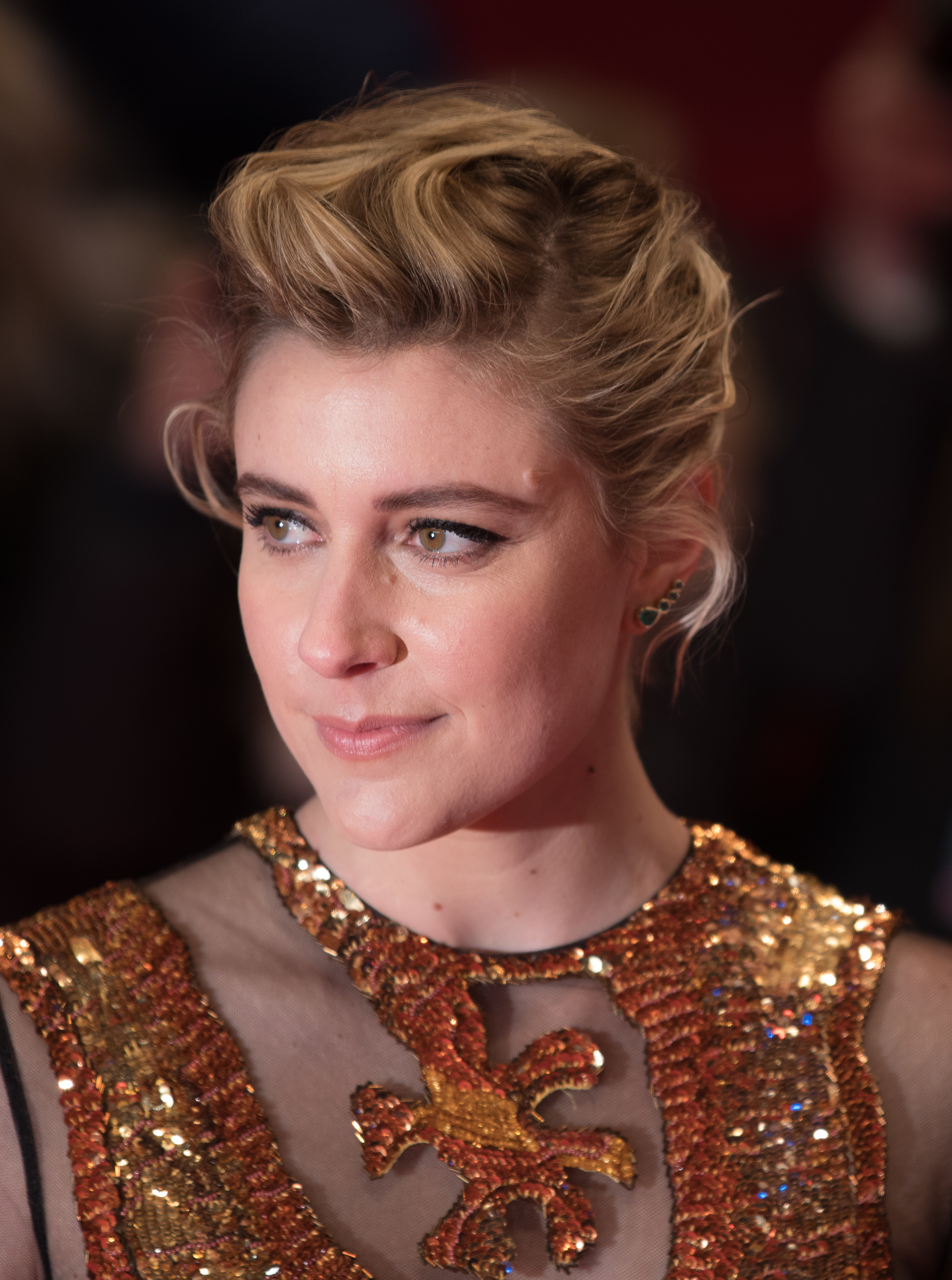
Greta Gerwig won for Lady Bird.

Year	Film	Recipient(s)
2010	The Kids Are All Right	Stuart Blumberg and Lisa Cholodenko
2010	Life During Wartime	Todd Solondz
2010	Please Give	Nicole Holofcener
2010	Rabbit Hole	David Lindsay-Abaire
2010	Winter's Bone	Debra Granik and Anne Rosellini
2011	The Descendants	Alexander Payne, Nat Faxon, and Jim Rash
2011	The Artist	Michel Hazanavicius
2011	Beginners	Mike Mills
2011	Footnote	Joseph Cedar
2011	Win Win	Tom McCarthy
2012	Silver Linings Playbook	David O. Russell
2012	Keep the Lights On	Ira Sachs and Mauricio Zacharias
2012	Moonrise Kingdom	Wes Anderson and Roman Coppola
2012	Ruby Sparks	Zoe Kazan
2012	Seven Psychopaths	Martin McDonagh
2013	12 Years a Slave	John Ridley
2013	Before Midnight	Richard Linklater, Ethan Hawke, and Julie Delpy
2013	Blue Jasmine	Woody Allen
2013	Enough Said	Nicole Holofcener
2013	The Spectacular Now	Scott Neustadter and Michael H. Weber
2014	Nightcrawler	Dan Gilroy
2014	Big Eyes	Scott Alexander and Larry Karaszewski
2014	Love Is Strange	Ira Sachs and Mauricio Zacharias
2014	A Most Violent Year	J. C. Chandor
2014	Only Lovers Left Alive	Jim Jarmusch
2015	Spotlight	Tom McCarthy and Josh Singer
2015	Anomalisa	Charlie Kaufman
2015	Bone Tomahawk	S. Craig Zahler
2015	Carol	Phyllis Nagy
2015	The End of the Tour	Donald Margulies
2016	Moonlight	Barry Jenkins and Tarell Alvin McCraney
2016	20th Century Women	Mike Mills
2016	Hell or High Water	Taylor Sheridan
2016	Little Men	Ira Sachs and Mauricio Zacharias
2016	Manchester by the Sea	Kenneth Lonergan
2017	Lady Bird	Greta Gerwig
2017	Beatriz at Dinner	Mike White
2017	Get Out	Jordan Peele
2017	The Lovers	Azazel Jacobs
2017	Three Billboards Outside Ebbing, Missouri	Martin McDonagh
2018	Can You Ever Forgive Me?	Nicole Holofcener and Jeff Whitty
2018	Colette	Richard Glatzer, Rebecca Lenkiewicz, and Wash Westmoreland
2018	First Reformed	Paul Schrader
2018	Private Life	Tamara Jenkins
2018	Sorry to Bother You	Boots Riley
2019	Marriage Story	Noah Baumbach
2019	Clemency	Chinonye Chukwu
2019	High Flying Bird	Tarell Alvin McCraney
2019	To Dust	Jason Begue and Shawn Snyder
2019	Uncut Gems	Ronald Bronstein, Josh Safdie and Benny Safdie

=== 2020s ===
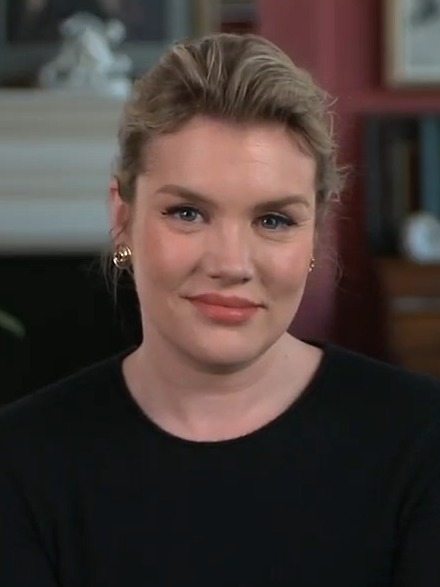
Emerald Fennell won for Promising Young Woman.

Year	Film	Recipient(s)
2020	Promising Young Woman	Emerald Fennell
2020	Bad Education	Mike Makowsky
2020	The Half of It	Alice Wu
2020	Minari	Lee Isaac Chung
2020	Never Rarely Sometimes Always	Eliza Hittman
2021	The Lost Daughter	Maggie Gyllenhaal
2021	C'mon C'mon	Mike Mills
2021	Swan Song	Todd Stephens
2021	Together Together	Nikole Beckwith
2021	Zola	Janicza Bravo and Jeremy O. Harris
2022	Everything Everywhere All at Once	Daniel Kwan and Daniel Scheinert
2022	After Yang	Kogonada
2022	Catherine Called Birdy	Lena Dunham
2022	Tár	Todd Field
2022	Women Talking	Sarah Polley
2023	American Fiction	Cord Jefferson
2023	Birth/Rebirth	Laura Moss and Brendan J. O'Brien
2023	Bottoms	Emma Seligman and Rachel Sennott
2023	The Holdovers	David Hemingson
2023	Past Lives	Celine Song
2024	A Real Pain	Jesse Eisenberg
2024	A Different Man	Aaron Schimberg
2024	Heretic	Scott Beck and Bryan Woods
2024	I Saw the TV Glow	Jane Schoenbrun
2024	My Old Ass	Megan Park
2025	Sorry, Baby	Eva Victor
2025	A Little Prayer	Angus MacLachlan
2025	Splitsville	Michael Angelo Covino and Kyle Marvin
2025	Sovereign	Christian Swegal
2025	Twinless	James Sweeney

== See also ==
- Golden Globe Award for Best Screenplay
- BAFTA Award for Best Original Screenplay
- BAFTA Award for Best Adapted Screenplay
- Academy Award for Best Original Screenplay
- Academy Award for Best Adapted Screenplay
- Critics' Choice Movie Award for Best Original Screenplay
- Critics' Choice Movie Award for Best Adapted Screenplay
- Writers Guild of America Award for Best Original Screenplay
- Writers Guild of America Award for Best Adapted Screenplay
