= Angelika Saleh =

German-American designer (1935–2026)

Angelika Saleh (Aug. 18, 1935–February 12, 2026) was a German American designer. She and her husband Joseph Saleh were the founders of the Angelika Film Center, an independent cinema in New York City.

Saleh was born in Munich, Germany in 1935 and died in New York City of complications of Alzheimer's disease on February 12, 2026.

== Filmography ==
- Bombay Talkie (1970)
- Streetwise (1984), executive producer
- The Chair (1988)
