= Tiny: Streetwise Revisited =

2015 book by Mary Ellen Mark

Streetwise: Tiny Revisited
- First edition
- Author: Mary Ellen Mark
- Language: English
- Genre: Photography
- Published: 2015
- Publisher: Aperture
- Publication place: United States
- ISBN: 978-1-59711-262-8

Tiny: Streetwise Revisited is a photography book by Mary Ellen Mark that was published by Aperture in October 2015. It includes photos taken by Mark over 30 years of her friendship with Erin "Tiny" Blackwell. The book is a follow-up to Mark's 1985 book Streetwise, itself a companion to the 1984 film of the same name, directed by her husband Martin Bell.
