= Mary Ellen Mark =

American photographer (1940–2015)

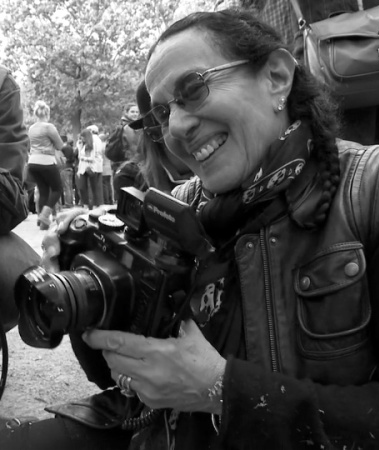
- Mark in 2010
- Born: March 20, 1940; Elkins Park, Pennsylvania, US
- Died: May 25, 2015 (aged 75); Manhattan, New York City, US
- Known for: Photography
- Spouse: Martin Bell

Mary Ellen Mark (March 20, 1940 – May 25, 2015) was an American photographer known for her photojournalism, documentary photography, portraiture, and advertising photography. She photographed people who were "away from mainstream society and toward its more interesting, often troubled fringes".

Mark had 21 collections of her work published, most notably Streetwise and Ward 81. Her work was exhibited at galleries and museums worldwide and widely published in Life, Rolling Stone, The New Yorker, The New York Times, and Vanity Fair. She was a member of Magnum Photos between 1977 and 1981. She received numerous accolades, including three Robert F. Kennedy Journalism Awards, three fellowships from the National Endowment for the Arts, the 2014 Lifetime Achievement in Photography Award from the George Eastman House and the Outstanding Contribution Photography Award from the World Photography Organisation.

== Life and work ==
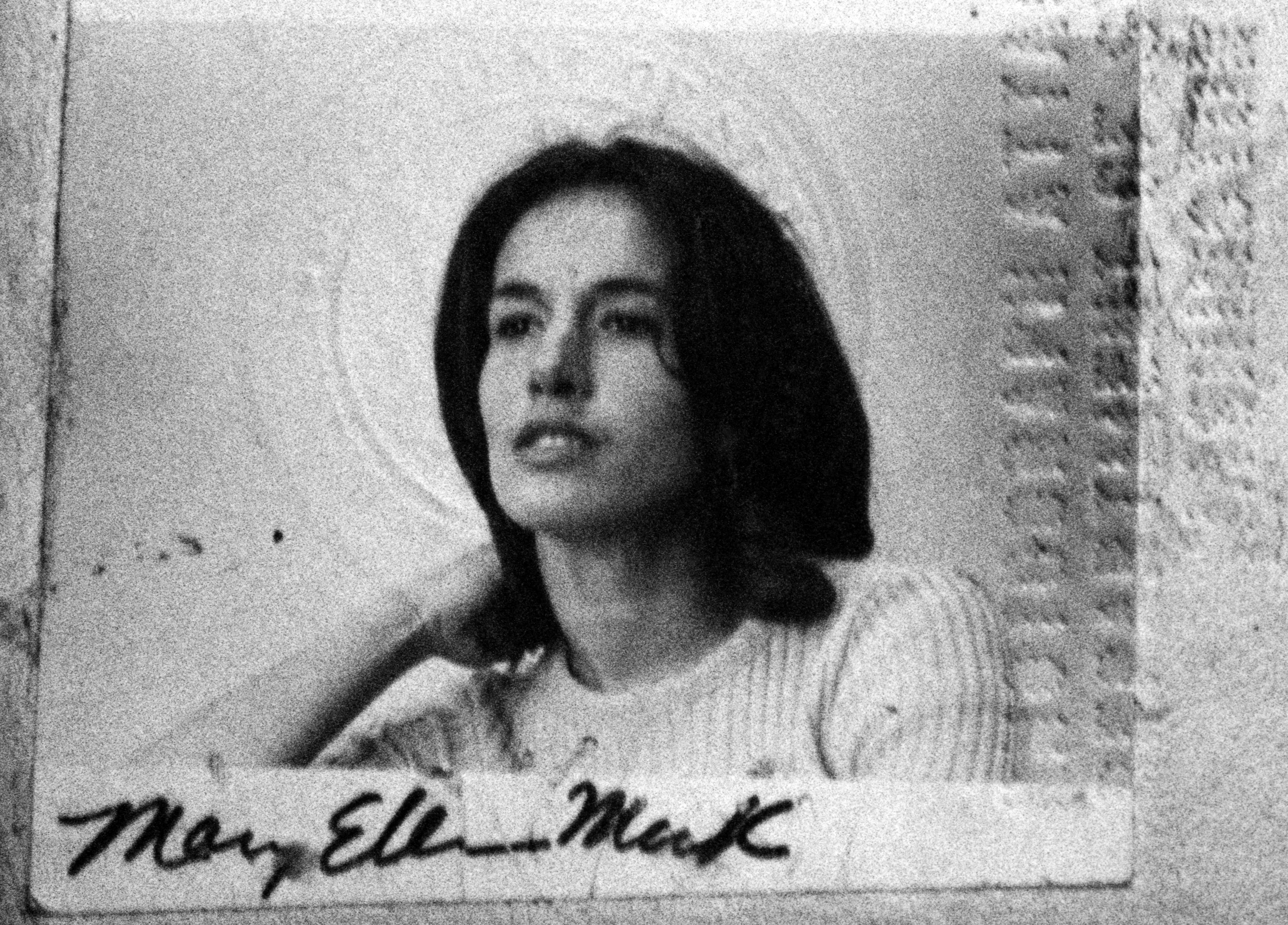
Mary Ellen Mark's passport photo, 1963. (photo by Lou Barlow)

Mark was born and raised in Elkins Park, Pennsylvania. and began photographing with a Box Brownie camera at age nine. She attended Cheltenham High School, where she was head cheerleader and exhibited a knack for painting and drawing. She received a Bachelor of Fine Arts in painting and art history from the University of Pennsylvania in 1962. After graduating, she worked briefly in the Philadelphia city planning department, then returned for a master's degree in photojournalism at the Annenberg School for Communication at the University of Pennsylvania, which she received in 1964. The following year, Mark received a Fulbright Scholarship to photograph in Turkey for a year, from which she produced her first book, Passport (1974). While there, she traveled to photograph England, Germany, Greece, Italy, and Spain.

In 1966 or 1967, she moved to New York City, where over the next several years she photographed demonstrations in opposition to the Vietnam War, the women's liberation movement, transvestite culture, and Times Square, developing a sensibility, according to one writer, "away from mainstream society and toward its more interesting, often troubled fringes". Her photography addressed social issues such as homelessness, loneliness, drug addiction, and prostitution. Children are a reoccurring subject throughout much of Mark's work. She described her approach to her subjects: "I’ve always felt that children and teenagers are not "children," they’re small people. I look at them as little people and I either like them or I don’t like them. I also have an obsession with mental illness. And strange people who are outside the borders of society." Mark also said "I’d rather pull up things from another culture that are universal, that we can all relate to...There are prostitutes all over the world. I try to show their way of life." and that "I feel an affinity for people who haven't had the best breaks in society. What I want to do more than anything is acknowledge their existence". Mark was well known for establishing strong relationships with her subjects. For Ward 81 (1979), she lived for six weeks with the patients in the women’s security ward of Oregon State Hospital, and for Falkland Road (1981), she spent three months befriending the prostitutes who worked on a single long street in Bombay. Her project "Streets of the Lost" with writer Cheryl McCall, for Life, produced her book Streetwise (1988) and was developed into the documentary film Streetwise, directed by her husband Martin Bell and with a soundtrack by Tom Waits.

Mark was also a special stills photographer on movie sets, shooting production stills of more than 100 movies, including Arthur Penn's Alice's Restaurant (1969), Mike Nichols' Catch-22 (1970) and Carnal Knowledge (1971), Francis Ford Coppola's Apocalypse Now (1979), and Baz Luhrmann's Australia (2008). For Look magazine, she photographed Federico Fellini shooting Satyricon (1969).

Mark worked with film, using a wide range of cameras in various formats, from 35 mm, 120/220, 4×5-inch view camera, and a 20×24 Polaroid Land Camera, primarily in black and white using Kodak Tri-X film.

She published 21 books of photographs and contributed to publications that include Life, Rolling Stone, The New Yorker, New York Times, and Vanity Fair;. Mark was transparent with the subjects of her photography about her intent to use what she saw in the world for her art, about which she has said "I just think it's important to be direct and honest with people about why you're photographing them and what you're doing. After all, you are taking some of their soul."

Mark was a Documentary Competition Juror at the 2004 Sundance Film Festival.

Mark joined Magnum Photos in 1977 and left in 1981, joining Archive Pictures and then in 1988 opened her own agency. She served as a guest juror for photography call for entries at The Center for Fine Art Photography and taught workshops at the International Center of Photography in New York, in Mexico and at the Center for Photography at Woodstock.

Mark and her husband Martin Bell worked on the documentary film Streetwise together. The film was based on Mark's photographic essay "Streets of the Lost" made on assignment for Life magazine with writer Cheryl McCall.

Mark and Bell continued to document one of the characters from Streetwise, Erin "Tiny" Blackwell. The film Tiny: The Life of Erin Blackwell and the book Tiny: Streetwise Revisited are the culmination of this 30+ year journey.

They also collaborated on other film projects in conjunction with Mark's photographic projects, including Twins, Prom, Indian Circus and Extraordinary Child.

She was the associate producer and still photographer for the feature film American Heart (1992), starring Jeff Bridges and Edward Furlong, and directed by Martin Bell. It depicts a gruff ex-convict who struggles to get his life back on track.

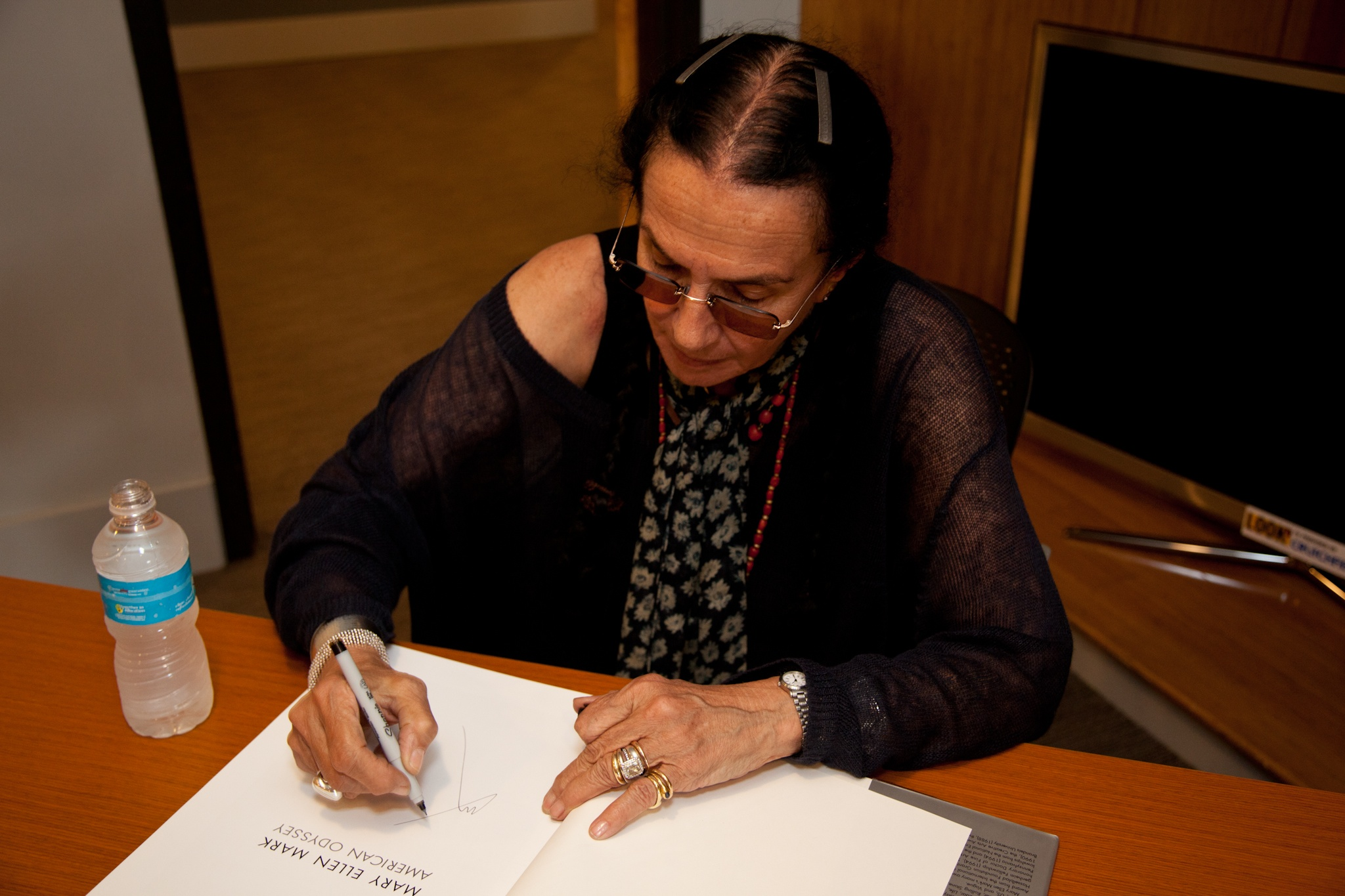
Mark signing a monograph in 2011

Mark died on May 25, 2015, in Manhattan, aged 75, of myelodysplastic syndrome, a blood illness caused by bone marrow failure.

== Publications ==
- Passport. New York: Lustrum Press, 1974. ISBN 978-0-912810-14-0.
- Photojournalism: Mary Ellen Mark and Annie Leibovitz: The Woman's Perspective. Petersons, 1974. ISBN 978-0-8227-0069-2.
- Ward 81. New York: Simon & Schuster, 1979. ISBN 978-0-671-24545-0. Main text by Karen Folger Jacobs, introduction by Miloš Forman.
  - 2nd ed. Bologna: Damiani, 2008. ISBN 978-88-6208-055-2.
- Falkland Road: Prostitutes of Bombay: Photographs and Text. New York: Knopf, 1981. ISBN 978-0-394-50987-7.
- Photographs of Mother Teresa's Mission of Charity in Calcutta. Carmel, CA: Friends of Photography, 1985. ISBN 978-0-933286-43-6. Introduction by David Featherston.
- Streetwise. Philadelphia: University of Pennsylvania, 1988. ISBN 978-0-8122-1268-6. Text and photographs edited by Nancy Baker, introduction by John Irving.
  - Second printing. New York: Aperture, 1992. ISBN 978-0-89381-487-8.
- The Photo Essay. Photographers at Work series. Washington, DC: Smithsonian Institution Press, 1990. ISBN 978-1-56098-003-2.
- Mary Ellen Mark: 25 Years. New York: Bulfinch, 1991. ISBN 978-0-8212-1837-2. Text by Marianne Fulton. Accompanied an exhibition at George Eastman House.
- Indian Circus. San Francisco: Chronicle Books, 1993, and Japan: Takarajimasha, 1993. ISBN 978-0-8118-0531-5. Foreword by John Irving.
- Portraits. Milan: Federico Motta, 1995. ISBN 978-88-7179-075-6. Italian-language version.
  - Washington: Smithsonian Institution, 1997. ISBN 978-1-56098-720-8. Foreword by Mary Panzer.
- A Cry for Help: Stories of Homelessness and Hope. New York: Simon & Schuster, 1996. ISBN 978-0-684-82593-9. Introduction by Andrew Cuomo, preface by Robert Coles, interviews reported by Victoria Kohn.
- Mary Ellen Mark: American Odyssey. New York: Aperture, 1999. ISBN 978-0-89381-880-7. Edited by Melissa Harris, afterword by Mark and with a poem each by Maya Angelou and La Shawndrea. Accompanied an exhibition by Philadelphia Museum of Art. "A broad survey of photographs taken across the United States from 1963–1999."
- Mary Ellen Mark 55. Phaidon 55 series. London: Phaidon, 2001. ISBN 978-0-7148-4617-0. "A collection of both iconic and previously unpublished photographs."
- Mary Ellen Mark. Photo Poche series. Paris: Nathan, 2002. "Photographs taken between 1965 and 2001."
- Twins. New York: Aperture, 2003. ISBN 978-1-931788-19-9.
- Exposure: Mary Ellen Mark: The Iconic Photographs. London: Phaidon, 2005. Hardback, 2005. ISBN 978-0-7148-4404-6. Paperback, 2006. ISBN 978-0-7148-4626-2. A retrospective. Introductions by Weston Naef and Mark, extensive captions by Mark.
- Undrabörn: Extraordinary Child. Reykjavík: National Museum of Iceland, 2007. ISBN 978-9979-790-14-3. Foreword by Margaret Hallgrimsdottir, introduction by Mark, essay by Einar Falur Ingólfsson. Catalogue of an exhibition at the National Gallery of Photography, 8 September 2007 – 27 January 2008. Icelandic and English.
- Seen Behind the Scene. London: Phaidon, 2008. ISBN 978-0-7148-4847-1. Introduction by Mark, "A World Behind the Scene" and texts by Francis Ford Coppola, Helen Mirren, Alejandro González Iñárritu and others. Portraits made on film sets.
  - Uno sguardo dietro le quinte. Quarant'anni di fotografie sui set cinematografici. Phaidon, 2009. ISBN 978-0-7148-5712-1.
- Prom. Los Angeles: J. Paul Getty Museum, 2012. ISBN 978-1-60606-108-4. "Images of high school students at their proms, photographed by Mary Ellen Mark at thirteen schools across the United States. The book includes a DVD of the film, also titled Prom, by filmmaker Martin Bell"
- Man and Beast: Photographs from Mexico and India. Austin: University of Texas, 2014. ISBN 978-0-292-75611-3. With transcript of an interview with Mark by Melissa Harris.
- Mary Ellen Mark on the Portrait and the Moment. The Photography Workshop Series. New York: Aperture, 2015. ISBN 978-1-59711-316-8.
- Tiny: Streetwise Revisited. New York: Aperture, 2015. ISBN 978-1-59711-262-8. With an afterword by Mark, a prologue by Isabel Allende and text by John Irving.
- The Book of Everything. Göttingen, Germany: Steidl, 2020. Edited by Martin Bell. ISBN 978-3-95829-565-0.

== Exhibitions ==
- 1994-95 – Mary Ellen Mark: 25 Years, National Museum of Women in the Arts, Washington, D.C.
- 2000 – Mary Ellen Mark: Photographs, Philadelphia Museum of Art, Philadelphia, Pennsylvania
- 2003 – Twins, Marianne Boesky Gallery, New York
- 2004 – Mary Ellen Mark: Twins and Falkland Road, Museum of Contemporary Photography, Chicago, Illinois
- 2005 – Falkland Road, Yancey Richardson Gallery, New York
- 2008 – Mary Ellen Mark: The Prom Series, Johnson Museum of Art, Ithaca, New York
- 2009 – Seen Behind The Scene, Staley-Wise Gallery, New York
- 2012 – Prom: Photographs, Philadelphia Museum of Art, Philadelphia, Pennsylvania
- 2014 – Mary Ellen Mark: Man and Beast, Wittliff Collections, Texas State University, San Macros, Texas
- 2016 – Attitude: Portraits by Mary Ellen Mark, 1964–2015, Howard Greenberg Gallery, New York
- 2017 – Looking For Home: A Yearlong Focus, The Museum of Street Culture, Dallas, Texas
- 2020-21 – Mary Ellen Mark: Twins, the San Diego Museum of Art, San Diego, California
- 2021 – Mary Ellen Mark: Girlhood, National Museum of Women in the Arts, Washington, D.C.
- 2023 – Mary Ellen Mark: Ward 81, The Image Centre, Toronto, Canada
- 2023–24 – Mary Ellen Mark: Retrospective, C/O Berlin, Amerika-Haus, Berlin, Germany

== Recognition and awards ==
- 1965–66: Fulbright Scholarship to take photographs in Turkey.
- 1980: First Prize, Robert F. Kennedy Journalism Award, "Mother Teresa", Life
- 1980: Page One Award for Excellence in Journalism, The Newspaper Guild of New York, "Children of Desire", The New York Times Magazine
- 1981: First Prize, Robert F. Kennedy Journalism Award, "Mother Teresa in Calcutta", Life Magazine
- 1982: Leica Medal of Excellence, Falkland Road
- 1984: First Prize, Robert F. Kennedy Journalism Award, "Camp Good Times", Life
- 1985: 2nd Prize, News Feature stories, World Press Photo 1986
- 1986: The Phillipe Halsman Award for Photojournalism, American Society of Magazine Photographers
- 1987: Photographer of the Year Award, The Friends of Photography
- 1988: World Press Photo Award, for Outstanding Body of Work Throughout the Years
- 1988: George Polk Award, Photojournalism
- 1988: Distinguished Photographer's Award, Women in Photography
- 1989: The World Hunger Media Awards, Best Photojournalism, "Children of Poverty", Life
- 1990: Pictures of the Year Award for Magazine Portrait/Personality, "The Face of Rural Poverty", Fortune Magazine
- 1992: Society of Newspaper Design, Award of Excellence, Magazine Cover and Photojournalism Feature, The New York Times Magazine
- 1993: Front Page Award, The Newswomen's Club of New York, "Cree Indians" for Condé Nast Traveler
- 1994: The Professional Photographer of the Year Award, Photographic Manufacturers and Distributors Association
- 1995: Pictures of the Year, 1st Place Magazine Division, "Napping" Freelance/Life
- 1996: Pictures of the Year, 1st Place Magazine Division, for issue reporting "Damm Family"; 3rd place in Magazine division for picture essay
- 1996: Master Series Award, School of Visual Arts
- 1997: Infinity Award, International Center of Photography
- 1998: The Art Directors Club Silver Award, "El Circo"
- 1998: The Society of Publication Designers, Gold Medal Award for Design Entire Issue, "Battle of the Generations", Fast Company
- 1999: Leadership Award, International Photographic Council
- 1999: Photographic Administrators Incorporated, Award for Excellence in Photojournalism
- 2001: Cornell Capa Award, International Center of Photography
- 2003: World Press Photo Awards, First Prize in the Arts (Twins series)
- 2003: Lucie Awards for Outstanding Achievement in Documentary Photography.
- 2006: Visionary Woman Award, Moore College of Art & Design
- 2014: 2014 Lifetime Achievement in Photography Award from the George Eastman House.
- 2014: Outstanding Contribution Photography Award from the World Photography Organisation.

== Grants and fellowships ==
- 1975: United States Information Agency grant to lecture and exhibit photographs in Yugoslavia
- 1977: National Endowment for the Arts
- 1977: New York State Council for the Arts grant
- 1979–1980: National Endowment for the Arts
- 1990: National Endowment for the Arts
- 1994: John Simon Guggenheim Fellowship
- 1997: Hasselblad Foundation Grant to continue work on American Odyssey
