= Ruby in Paradise =

- Video release poster
- Directed by: Victor Nunez
- Written by: Victor Nunez
- Produced by: Keith Crofford
- Starring: Ashley Judd; Todd Field; Bentley Mitchum; Allison Dean; Dorothy Lyman
- Cinematography: Alex Vlacos
- Edited by: Victor Nunez
- Music by: Charles Engstrom
- Production companies: Full Crew; Say Yea Productions
- Distributed by: October Films; Republic Pictures
- Release dates: January 1993 (Sundance); October 8, 1993 (U.S.)
- Running time: 115 minutes
- Language: English
- Budget: $800,000 (estimated)
- Box office: $1 million

Ruby in Paradise is a 1993 film written and directed by Victor Nunez, starring Ashley Judd, Todd Field, Bentley Mitchum, Allison Dean, and Dorothy Lyman. An homage to Northanger Abbey by Jane Austen, the film is a character study about a young woman who escapes her small town in Tennessee for a new life in coastal Florida. The film marks Judd's first starring role.

The film won the Grand Jury Prize for Dramatic Feature at the 1993 Sundance Film Festival. It was also nominated for six Independent Spirit Awards, with Judd winning for Best Female Lead.

== Plot ==
Ruby is a woman in her early 20s and the narrator of the film. She leaves her small town in Tennessee after her mother dies, ultimately landing in Panama City, Florida, a summer resort town she visited as a child. She arrives in Panama City (nicknamed "Redneck Riviera") in the fall, the beginning of the off-season when tourism is slow. Despite this, Ruby manages to get a job at Chambers Beach Emporium, a souvenir store run by Mildred Chambers. Mildred rejects Ruby's application initially, but Ruby wins her over by telling her, "I've done retail before, and I work real cheap."

Over the course of a year Ruby keeps a journal where she contemplates her career ups and downs, her love life, her past, and her future. Ruby's introspective narration is interspersed with routine scenes at the souvenir store, and conversations with her friend Rochelle or the men she dates, Ricky and Mike.

== Cast ==
- Ashley Judd as Ruby Lee Gissing
- Todd Field as Mike McCaslin
- Bentley Mitchum as Ricky Chambers
- Allison Dean as Rochelle Bridges
- Dorothy Lyman as Mildred Chambers
- Betsy Douds as Debrah Ann
- Felicia Hernández as Persefina

== Production ==
When Victor Nuñez originally pitched the film to distributors, he found they were uninterested: "I was told flat outright -- and these were very reputable distributors of independent films -- 'no one is interested in a film about a female shop clerk in Panama City.' Now, you can say what they really were saying was 'shop clerk Panama City,' but the message was a woman, you know, as in the lead role," Nuñez said.

He considered changing the gender of the lead to a man, but didn't find the story sufficiently interesting to him, reasoning "For one thing and I think it's changing to some degree, American men, by and large, don't allow as many vulnerabilities to be acknowledged and to be explored."

Ruby in Paradise was filmed on Super 16 on location in Panama City, Florida at locations including Show N Tail gentleman's club and White Western Cabin.

== Release ==
The film premiered in January 1993 at the Sundance Film Festival, where October Films acquired North American distribution rights. It was also shown at the Cannes Film Festival, the New York Film Festival, and the Boston Film Festival. The film was given a limited release in North American theaters on October 8, 1993.

=== Home media ===
After the movie's theatrical run, the film was released on videocassette and LaserDisc in 1994 by Republic Pictures. It was released on video in Canada that same year by Cineplex Odeon. In 2008, Alliance Films released the movie on DVD in Canada.

On February 16, 2021, Ruby in Paradise received a digital restoration in HD from Quiver Distribution and was made available on digital platforms.

== Critical reception ==
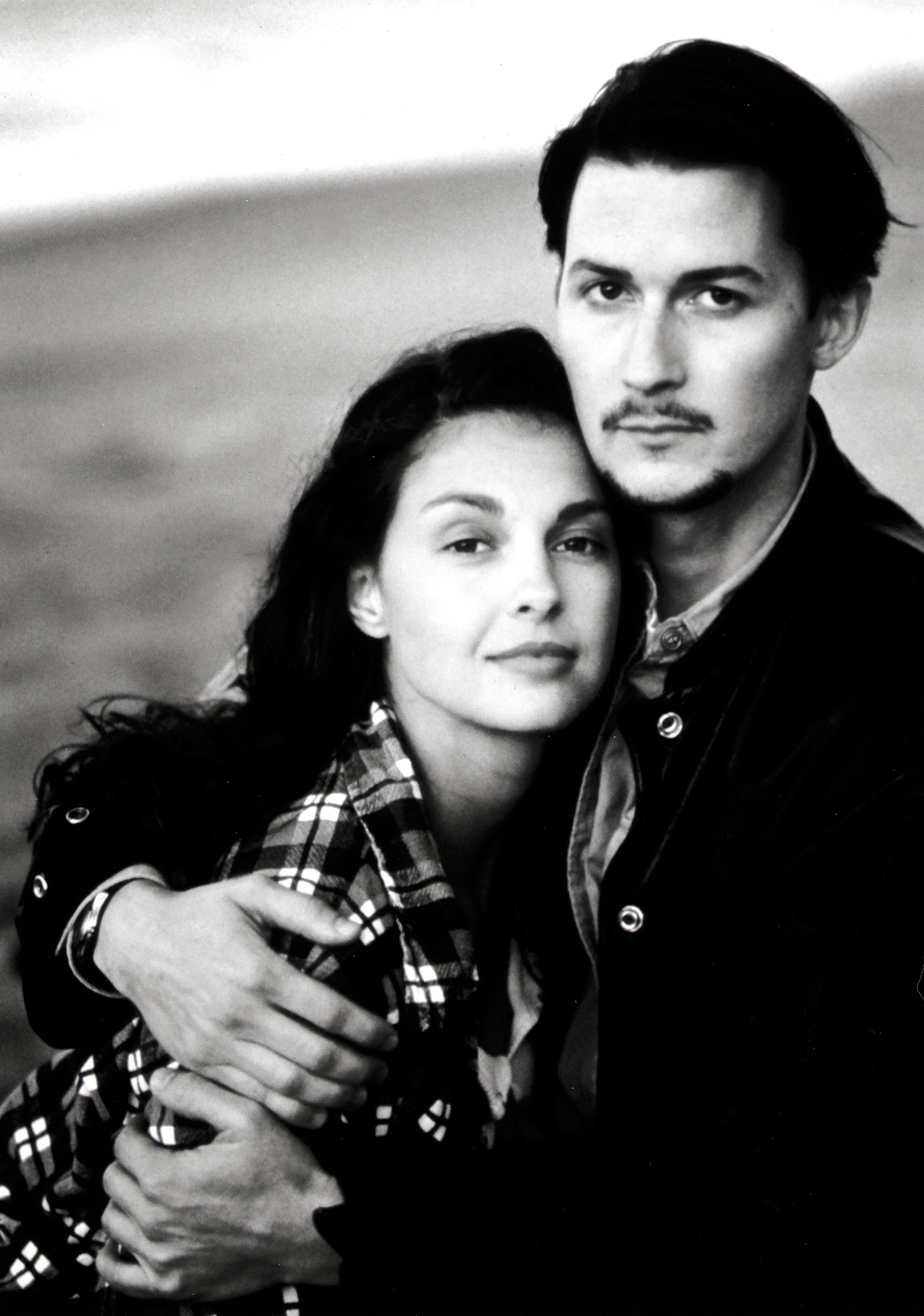
Ashley Judd & Todd Field in Victor Nuñez's Ruby in Paradise

On Rotten Tomatoes, the film holds a rating of 86% from 28 reviews with the consensus: "Led by a magnetic performance from Ashley Judd, the gently subdued Ruby in Paradise perceptively captures one woman's journey of self-discovery." On Metacritic it has a score of 77% based on reviews from 25 critics, indicating "generally favorable reviews".

Roger Ebert of the Chicago Sun-Times gave it 4 stars out of 4, and wrote: "Ruby in Paradise is a wonderful, life-affirming movie about a young woman who has that kind of luck. It's a celebration of heart, courage and persistence." Ebert also picked it as one of his Top Ten Films of 1993.

Variety wrote: "Victor Nunez has returned with a film of gentle, intelligent qualities, vividly portraying a young woman's inner life."

Steve Persall of the Tampa Bay Times said, "You can tell [Nuñez] loves his home state, not from any postcard vistas—there are none in Ruby in Paradise—but from tell-tale glances at how Floridians relate to newcomers, tourists and an evolving class structure. Nunez knows there are plenty of Rubys crossing the state line every year and most won't discover a pot of gold at the end of the turnpike. His honesty is eye-opening, even to a longtime resident."

== Awards and nominations ==
The film won the 1993 Grand Jury Prize for Drama at the Sundance Film Festival (together with Public Access). Judd's performance earned her the Independent Spirit Award for Best Female Lead as well as the Emerging Actress Award from the Chicago Film Critics Association. The film received Independent Spirit Award nominations for Best Film, Best Cinematography for Alex Vlacos, Best Director and Best Screenplay for Victor Nuñez, and Best Supporting Actor for Todd Field. The film was also nominated for the Grand Prix of the Belgian Syndicate of Cinema Critics.

Awards
Preceded by In the Soup	Sundance Grand Jury Prize: U.S. Dramatic; 1993 tied with Public Access	Succeeded by What Happened Was
