= Martin Bell (director) =

American film director

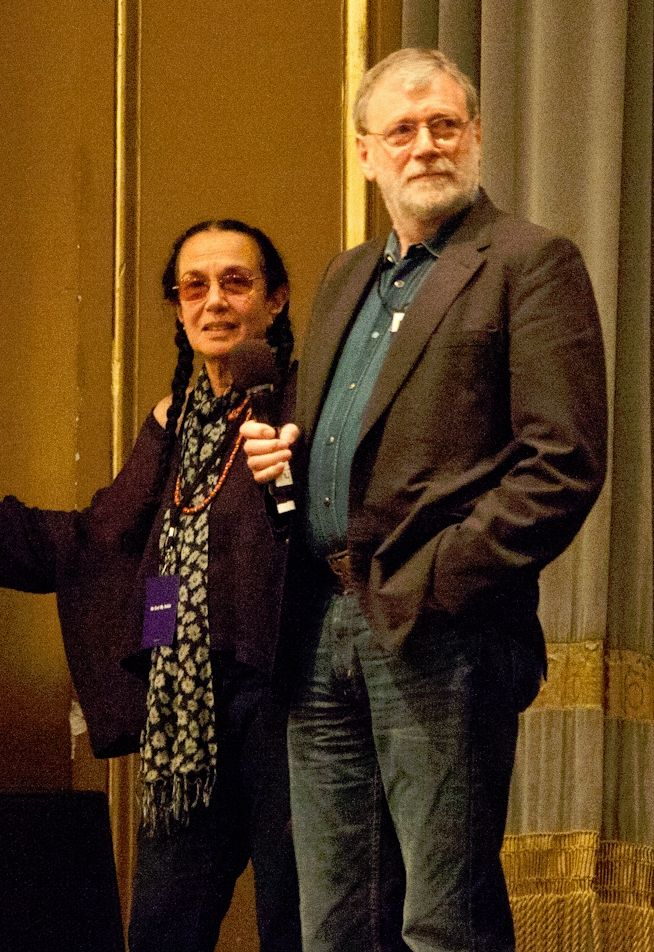
- Bell with wife Mary Ellen Mark at the 2011 Look 3 photography conference
- Born: January 16, 1943 (age 83); Huddersfield, Yorkshire
- Occupation: Film director
- Years active: 1971-present
- Spouse: Mary Ellen Mark

Martin Bell (born January 16, 1943) is an American film director best known for films such as Streetwise and American Heart. He was nominated for an Academy Award for Best Documentary for Streetwise.

== Career ==
=== Documentaries ===
In 1983, Bell's wife, photographer Mary Ellen Mark, was hired by Life magazine to photograph a story on homeless children in Seattle, Washington with writer Cheryl McCall. The essay was titled "Streets of the Lost" and was published in July 1983. Having befriended many of the homeless children, Mark contacted her husband who flew to Seattle to document them on film. The project was eventually released as the documentary film Streetwise, which was subsequently nominated for an Academy Award for Best Documentary Feature in 1985.

Bell and Mark continued to document the ongoing struggles of one homeless child, Erin "Tiny" Blackwell, throughout her life. Their work on Blackwell was featured on Nightline and resulted in the feature-length documentary follow up Tiny: The Life of Erin Blackwell, which was released theatrically in 2016 and on home video by the Criterion Collection in 2021.

=== Feature films ===
Following the success of Streetwise, Bell made his feature film debut with American Heart starring Jeff Bridges and Edward Furlong. Inspired by the father-son relationship between Streetwise subject Dewayne Pomeroy and his incarcerated father, the film was nominated for five Independent Spirit Awards including Best First Feature for Martin Bell and won for Best Male Lead for Jeff Bridges.

Bell subsequently made two more narrative features, Hidden in America (1996) and Brotherhood of Murder (1998).

== Filmography ==
- Streetwise (1984)
- American Heart (1992)
- Tiny at 20 (1993) - short
- Hidden in America (1996)
- Brotherhood of Murder (1998)
- Twins (2004) - short
- Erin (2005) - short
- Prom (2010) - short
- Tiny: The Life of Erin Blackwell (2016)
- Streetwise Revisited: Rat (2021) - short
