= American Heart (film) =

1992 film by Martin Bell

- Directed by: Martin Bell
- Screenplay by: Peter Silverman; Martin Bell; Mary Ellen Mark
- Produced by: Jeff Bridges; Rosilyn Heller
- Starring: Jeff Bridges; Edward Furlong; Lucinda Jenney; Tracey Kapisky; Don Harvey
- Cinematography: James R. Bagdonas
- Edited by: Nancy Baker
- Music by: James Newton Howard
- Production companies: American Heart Productions; Avenue Pictures; Asis/Rosilyn Heller Productions
- Distributed by: Triton Pictures
- Release dates: September 17, 1992 (Toronto); May 7, 1993 (United States)
- Running time: 113 minutes
- Country: United States
- Language: English
- Budget: $10 million
- Box office: $384,015

American Heart is a 1992 American independent drama film directed by Martin Bell and starring Jeff Bridges and Edward Furlong. It was nominated for the Independent Spirit Award in a number of categories and won in the Best Male Lead category.

== Plot ==
Jack Kelson has just been released from prison in Seattle after serving a five-year sentence for robbing a jewelry store. His 14-year-old son Nick, whose mother has been dead for many years, is in desperate need of a father and arrives at the prison to meet him, but he is rebuffed. Nick persists on tagging along with Jack and the two take up residence at a cheap hotel. Over time, the two settle into a push-and-pull relationship. Jack tries to resist the pleas of his ex-partner Randy to return to robbery and finds a job downtown as a window washer. He also makes a phone call to a woman named Charlotte and they meet up at the hotel. It is revealed Charlotte had been writing letters to Jack while he was incarcerated, through the prison's publication American Heart where prisoners can solicit correspondence. Jack talks about moving to Alaska for a new life, but is not sure if he wants to bring Nick with him. Just as it appears Nick will be joining his father, he feels increasingly drawn to the life of crime his father is trying to avoid.

== Cast ==
- Jeff Bridges as Jack Kelson
  - Greg Sevigny as Young Jack
- Edward Furlong as Nick Kelson
- Lucinda Jenney as Charlotte
- Don Harvey as Rainey
- Tracey Kapisky as Molly
- Maggie Welsh as Freddie

== Production ==
Elements of the screenplay for American Heart were based on material originally covered in Martin Bell's documentary film Streetwise, such as the relationship between Dewayne and his father in that movie. The documentary caught the eye of Rosilyn Heller and her associate Jon Peters at the Guber-Peters Entertainment Company, who invited Bell and Mary Ellen Mark to Los Angeles to collaborate on a feature length screenplay with Peter Silverman for Warner Bros. However, after years of developing the screenplay, Silverman and Peters left Warner Bros. and ultimately lost interest in the project, sending the script to Jeff Bridges. Bridges then agreed to play the lead as well as produce the film, with Barry Spikings' Nelson Entertainment acquiring rights to it in 1989.

By March 1990, Mark Andrus and Yurek Bogayevicz boarded the project, with production scheduled to begin by that summer in New Orleans. However, there were disputes over Bogayevicz' revisions to the screenplay, prompting Bridges to revisit Silverman's original draft. After expressing his interest in returning to the original draft to Heller, Bell, and Mark, Avenue Pictures agreed to distribute and finance the project for $12 million, with additional funds raised through international sales by World Films, Inc. at the 1991 Cannes Film Festival.

American Heart was filmed in Seattle from August 1991 to October 1991. To prepare for the role, Jeff Bridges worked closely with Edward Bunker, an ex-con and author of the novel No Beast So Fierce which inspired the 1978 film Straight Time. Bridges also worked out with ex-cons to get his body in similar shape to that of a prisoner. Edward Furlong was cast prior to the release of his debut film Terminator 2 when photographer Mary Ellen Mark did a photo essay on kid actors. Furlong prepared for his role by visiting the Covenant House in Los Angeles, where his aunt formerly worked.

== Reception ==
=== Release ===
By the time production had completed, Avenue Pictures had declared bankruptcy, allowing Film Finances, Inc. to shop the film elsewhere. In March 1993, Trimark Pictures announced their acquisition of domestic distribution rights to the film, although the deal had not officially closed yet. However, Live Entertainment subsidiary Triton Pictures had a pre-existing agreement with Avenue Pictures, acquiring the film by matching Trimark's offer.

The film had its world premiere at the Toronto International Film Festival on September 17, 1992. It was then given a limited theatrical release in the United States on May 7, 1993.

=== Critical reception ===
American Heart received positive reviews from critics. On Rotten Tomatoes, it has an approval rating of 80% based on 15 reviews.

Bridges received widespread praise for his performance. Janet Maslin of The New York Times wrote, "It's time to recognize Mr. Bridges as the most underappreciated great actor of his generation. Although he approaches this potentially showy role without fanfare or ostentation, he has managed to transform himself to an astonishing degree." Of Furlong, Maslin said he "brings great dignity and a powerful sense of yearning to Nick's efforts to win over his father. He is equally good at capturing the frustration that sets in once Nick realizes what an uphill battle this will be."

Kevin Thomas of the Los Angeles Times also gave a positive review, praising the film's "spiky humor" and opining, "Not since Straight Time [...] has there here been a film that more convincingly depicted the plight of the ex-con in his struggle to earn an honest living than the engaging 'American Heart.'" He also said the film "might have been a richer, more encompassing experience had its makers not so easily equated being downbeat with being realistic and honest."

== Awards and nominations ==
American Heart was nominated for five Independent Spirit Awards including Best First Feature for Martin Bell, Best Supporting Female for Lucinda Jenney, Best Supporting Male for Edward Furlong, and Best Cinematography for James R. Bagdonas. The film won for Best Male Lead for Jeff Bridges.
