= Streetwise (1984 film) =

- Theatrical release poster
- Directed by: Martin Bell
- Produced by: Cheryl McCall
- Starring: Erin Blackwell (Tiny)
- Cinematography: Martin Bell
- Edited by: Nancy Baker
- Distributed by: Angelika Films
- Release date: 1984
- Running time: 91 minutes
- Country: United States
- Language: English

Streetwise is a 1984 American documentary film by director Martin Bell chronicling the lives of homeless youth on the streets of Seattle. It followed in the wake of a July 1983 Life magazine article "Streets of the Lost" by writer Cheryl McCall and photographer Mary Ellen Mark (Bell's wife).

== Synopsis ==
Streetwise portrays the lives of nine teenagers living on the streets of Seattle, Washington. Rat, the dumpster diver; Tiny, the teenage prostitute; Shellie, the baby-faced one; and DeWayne, the hustler, with a considerable portion of the film focusing on 14-year-old Erin Blackwell, a young prostitute who goes by the name of Tiny. Much of the time, Tiny stays at the home of her alcoholic mother, Pat, who seems unfazed by her daughter's prostitution, calling it a "phase".

== Production ==
According to Mark's accompanying 1985 book, also titled Streetwise, McCall and Mark traveled to Seattle, Washington specifically to reveal homelessness in a city that billed itself as "America's most liveable city". After making connections with several homeless youth during the writing of the article, Mark convinced Bell that the youth were worthy of a documentary based on their lives. The film was funded by singer Willie Nelson.

Principal photography took place from Labor Day to Halloween, 1983, with a final day on August 24, 1984.

== Reception ==
Streetwise has received a score of 92% on Rotten Tomatoes. Writing for National Review, John Simon stated "Its cumulative effect is tremendous, but not quite the way you might think. It makes you very sad, but even more indignant; and it also makes you laugh a lot." In a pan for Time, Richard Schickel wrote "These glimpses into prematurely ruined lives are inescapably affecting. Yet there is something that is finally repellent about Streetwise."

Streetwise was nominated for an Academy Award for Best Documentary Feature.

== Home media ==
Streetwise was released on VHS by New World Video in 1986. The film was released on DVD and Blu-ray by The Criterion Collection on June 15, 2021.

== Aftermath of subjects shown in the film ==
- Dewayne Pomeroy: As shown in the film, he hanged himself the day before his 17th birthday on July 30, 1984. Some of the street kids held a balloon release and planted a tree in Freeway Park in his memory. Plaque 21394 on the ground at the Pike Place Market says "Dewayne Pomeroy 1984". His story and relationship with his felon father was the inspiration for the 1992 film American Heart starring Jeff Bridges, with Edward Furlong playing Dewayne's part.
- "Little Justin" Reed Early authored a book, Street Child: A Memoir, based on his experience as a homeless child and became an advocate for homeless youths.
- Lou Ellen "Lulu" Couch was fatally stabbed by a man at an arcade on 1st and Pike Street in December 1985 at age 22 while trying to defend a girl who was being assaulted. Her last words were, "Tell Martin and Mary Ellen, Lulu died". Plaque 21393 on the ground at the Pike Place Market says "Lulu Couch 1985". Approximately 319 people attended her funeral. Surviving friends from the street raised funds to provide a headstone for Lulu's gravesite.
- Patti died of HIV/AIDS in 1993 at age 27.
- Rick "Rat" is married with children and has grandchildren.
- Frank "Shadow" has worked as a carpenter and a security guard.
- Erin Blackwell ("Tiny"): When Streetwise was nominated for a 1984 Academy Award for documentary, Tiny attended the Oscar ceremony with Bell and Mark. After that Tiny's life did not radically change tracks. Mark returned to Seattle to photograph Tiny many times since 1983, and photographs of Tiny have appeared in Mark's later books, which reveal that in the years after the Streetwise projects, Tiny continued her prostitution, became a drug addict, and gave birth to ten children fathered by several different men. In 1993, 10 years after the making of the film, she was featured in an ABC news program called Tiny's Story. In the mid-2000s, however, Mark and Bell's 23-minute film Erin revealed that Tiny had cleaned up and settled down with a husband and her minor children.
- Patrice Pitts: Pitts – known best in the film for his argument with the street preacher – remained homeless after the filming and battled severe drug addiction. On January 29, 2017, Pitts was shot and killed in front of the St. Charles Hotel. Two individuals were later arrested for the murder of the 52-year-old Pitts.
- Pat, the mother of Erin "Tiny" Blackwell featured in both documentaries with her daughter, died on September 24, 2024.
- Roberta Joseph Hayes was last seen leaving jail in Portland, Oregon on February 7, 1987. After arriving back in Seattle she was picked up by Gary Ridgway, also known as the Green River Killer, becoming his forty-seventh known victim. Her strangled body was not found until 1991.

== Sequel ==
On November 20, 2013, Mary Ellen Mark and Martin Bell launched the Streetwise: Tiny Revisited film project on Kickstarter. The film, titled Tiny: The Life of Erin Blackwell, had its premiere at the 2016 Seattle International Film Festival. It focuses on the life of Tiny and her family over the 30+ years since Streetwise.

A book was published in conjunction with the sequel. Streetwise: Tiny Revisited was published in the fall of 2015 by Aperture Foundation, and includes photos taken by Mark over 30 years of friendship with Tiny Blackwell.

== In popular culture ==
The character Rat's line "I love to fly. It's just, you're alone with peace and quiet, nothing around you but clear, blue sky. No one to hassle you. No one to tell you where to go or what to do. The only bad part about flying is having to come back down to the fucking world" is sampled in the song "Zap!" by The Avalanches (2016), as well as the songs "Say My Name or Say Whatever" by How to Dress Well (2012), "Unknown Summer" by Burial (2023), "Learn to Fly" by Priori and Sabola (2024), "Albatross" by Floater (2000), and "Seducer" by Saraya (1991). Another excerpt of dialogue is sampled in the song "すばらしくてNice Choice" by Fishmans (1996). English electronic-duo Jadu Heart sampled Streetwise dialogue in their album Hyper Romance.
