= Combination Platter =

- Directed by: Tony Chan
- Screenplay by: Edwin Baker; Tony Chan
- Produced by: Tony Chan: Mark Fuk Chan; Jenny Lee; Judy Moy; Ulla Zwicker
- Starring: Jeffrey Lau; Colleen O'Brien; Chit-Man Chan; Colin Mitchell; Kenneth Lu; Thomas K. Hsiung; Ellen Synn
- Production company: Bluehorse Films
- Release date: 1993
- Running time: 84 minutes
- Country: United States
- Language: English
- Budget: $250,000

Combination Platter is a 1993 drama film directed by Tony Chan starring Jeffrey Lau, Colleen O'Brien, and Chit-Man Chan. It is Chan’s directorial debut from a screenplay he co-wrote with Edwin Baker.

The film centers on Robert, a young Chinese undocumented immigrant living in Flushing, Queens, and his attempt to gain legal status as a U.S. citizen through a marriage of convenience. It premiered at the 1993 Sundance Film Festival, where it was nominated for a Grand Jury Prize for Chan and won a Waldo Salt Screenwriting Award for Chan and Baker.

== Plot ==
The film details the difficulties faced by Robert, young undocumented immigrant who works at a low-paying job in a Sichuan restaurant in the Queens neighborhood of Flushing. Seeking to obtain U.S. citizenship, Robert is told that a possible solution is to marry an American woman. Though he is initially hesitant towards the idea, he resolves to find someone who will marry him for a green card. In the meantime, Robert sends money to his parents back home in Hong Kong, along with letters which falsely portray a positive portrait of his life in America. One of Robert’s fellow waiters, Sam, is in major debt, which prompts him to pocket communal tips. A pair of regular customers at the restaurant, a young white man and his Asian-American girlfriend, make an impression on Robert.

Robert’s sympathetic boss Mr. Lee thinks business is too slow to create tax penalties for sponsoring Robert, and if he were to do so, it would take Robert about five years to get his green card. Robert also lets his street-smart friend Andy set him up with a shy white woman named Claire. However, Robert comes to realize he and Claire have hardly anything in common with each other. He ends up confessing to her that the real reason he is with her is to avail himself of a green card, which angers her and results in her breaking up with him. At work, Robert confronts Sam about his theft, which leads to Sam’s firing. Later, Immigration and Customs Enforcement raids the restaurant, and Robert narrowly avoids capture by hiding in the walk-in freezer. After this incident, Robert returns to work. With his plight still undetermined, he observes the couple he admires as the young white man proposes to his girlfriend.

== Cast ==
- Jeffrey Lau as Robert
- Colleen O' Brien as Claire
- Chit-Man Chan as Sam
- Colin Mitchell as Benny
- Kenneth Lau as Andy
- Thomas K. Hsiung as Mr. Lee
- Ellen Synn as Jennie
- Nathaniel Geng as Glasshead
- Jia Fu Liu as Dishwasher
- Peter Kwong as Stanley
- Eleonora Kihlberg as Noriko
- James Dumont as James

== Production ==
The film was shot at Flushing Meadows Park and at Rego Park, Queens over a period of 24 days. The restaurant in the film is owned by the real-life parents of the film’s director, Tony Chan. The young Hong Kong-born producer spent a year editing the footage in the kitchen of his family's Long Island home.

== Critical reception ==
Professional ratings
Review scores
| Source | Rating |
|---|---|
| TV Guide | 3/5 stars |

Kevin Thomas of the Los Angeles Times wrote, "Few films explore so thoroughly the role of cultural identity in creating unconscious racism--and with such a subtle, light touch." David Mills of The Washington Post commended director Tony Chan for breaking through the monolithic view white people so often have of Chinese people.

TV Guide voiced a similar sentiment, stating, "Chan's film confronts racial stereotyping by telling the stories of those too often excluded from the table of mass culture", adding, "Combination Platter presents some New York neighborhoods rarely shown in films or on TV and Chan utilizes his limited locations with aplomb."

Praise was also given to the film’s actors. Mills of The Post wrote, "As portrayed by stockbroker and amateur actor Jeff Lau, Robert is decent and earnest and instantly likable. Even so, by the movie's climax -- a raid by immigration officials -- it may surprise you to realize how much you care about him." Mills added, "Chan surrounds Robert with an interesting mix of characters...street-smart buddy Andy, who is helping him find a wife, seems especially hip when he's speaking in New Yawk-inflected English. Lester 'Chit-Man' Chan brings scowling authenticity to the part of Sam, the grumpy waiter who likes to insult his American customers in Chinese, right in front of their faces." Emanuel Levy of Variety also gave a positive review, commenting, "Though serious, the film is not devoid of comic touches or even action."

In addition, the film was praised for its multi-layered depiction of various cultural divides within the Chinese community, such as those "between immigrants and "ABCs" (American-born Chinese), [and] those who speak Cantonese and those who speak Mandarin". Kevin Thomas also acknowledged these barriers, while pointing out "the owner's...American-born niece Jennie (Ellen Synn), the restaurant's cashier…knows neither [the Cantonese or Mandarin dialect]--and eats Chinese food with a fork instead of chopsticks". Thomas wrote "Jennie's unfamiliarity with her ancestral language puts her in a situation similar to that of the restaurant's only white employee (Colin Mitchell), who's razzed by his friends for working in a Chinese restaurant in the first place."

== Year-end lists ==
- Honorable mention – Duane Dudek, Milwaukee Sentinel

== Awards and nominations ==
| Year | Category | Recipient | Result | Ref. |
|---|---|---|---|---|
| 1993 Sundance Film Festival | Waldo Salt Screenwriting Award | Tony Chan and Edwin Baker | Won | |
| 1993 Sundance Film Festival | Grand Jury Prize (dramatic) | Tony Chan | Nominated | |
| 9th Independent Spirit Awards | Best First Feature | Tony Chan and Judy Moy (producer) | Nominated | |
| 9th Independent Spirit Awards | Best Screenplay | Edwin Baker and Tony Chan | Nominated | |
