= 9th Independent Spirit Awards =

Film award edition

- Date: March 19, 1994
- Site: Hollywood Palladium, U.S.
- Hosted by: Robert Townsend

Highlights
- Best Film: Short Cuts
- Most awards: Short Cuts (3)
- Most nominations: Ruby in Paradise (6); The Wedding Banquet (6)

The 9th Independent Spirit Awards, honoring the best in independent filmmaking for 1993, were announced on March 19, 1994, at the Hollywood Palladium. The nominations were announced on January 14, 1994. Actor and director Robert Townsend hosted the ceremony, which was previously a position held on to for eight consecutive years by Buck Henry.

== Controversy ==
The announcement of that year's nominations—made by a committee of a governing body called the Independent Features Project West—was postponed due to a confusion over the eligibility of Gramercy Pictures' drama A Dangerous Woman. The IFPW board determined that the film, which initially had received two nominations, had been partially funded by Universal Pictures and thus was not eligible, according to then-IFPW President Cathy Main; Gramercy Pictures is jointly owned by Universal Pictures and PolyGram Filmed Entertainment. In response, Gramercy Pictures President Russell Schwartz said the IFPW's rules "make no sense" and the IFPW is "as archaic as the (Academy of Motion Picture Arts and Sciences') foreign language rules". Schwartz also added that Universal's only involvement was to guarantee a bank loan to the filmmaker and its money was not used.

== Winners and nominees ==
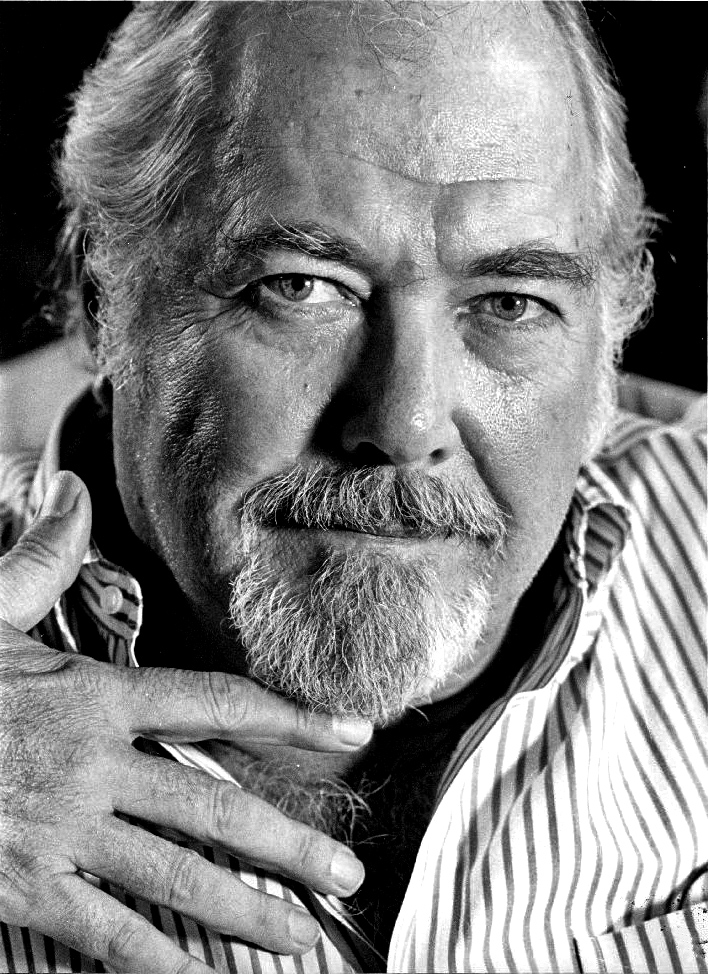
Robert Altman, Best Director winner and Best Screenplay co-winner

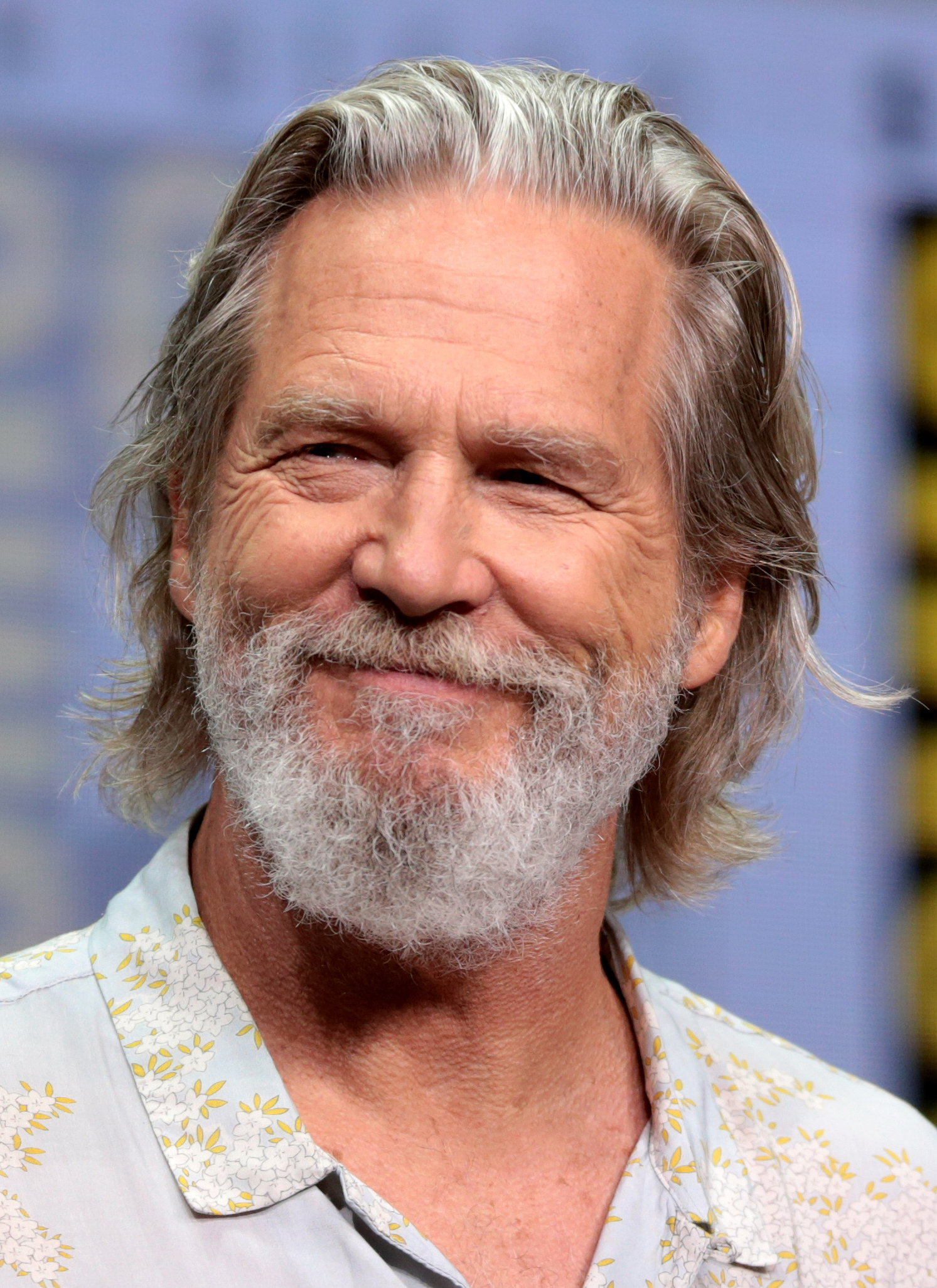
Jeff Bridges, Best Male Lead winner

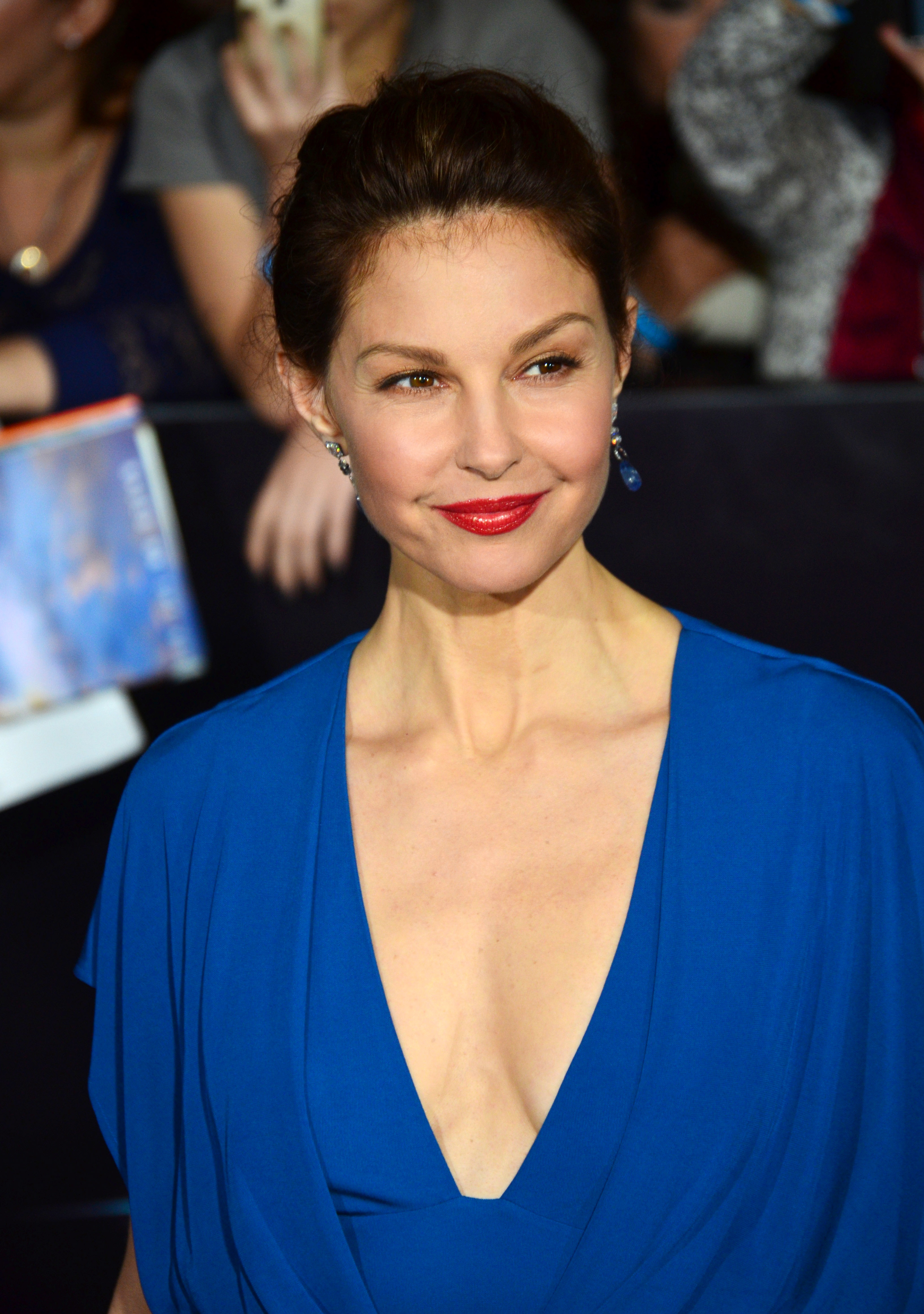
Ashley Judd, Best Female Lead winner

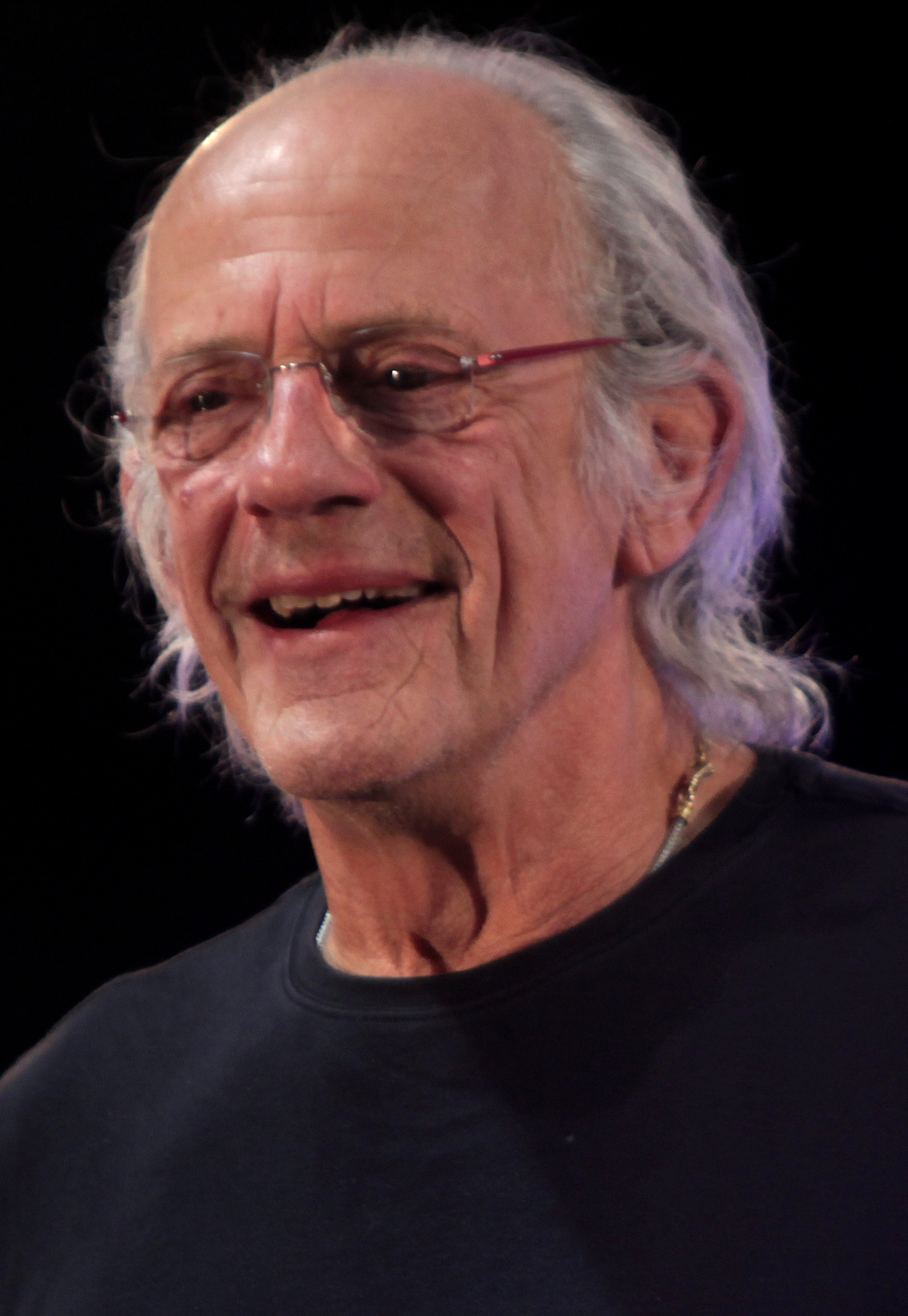
Christopher Lloyd, Best Supporting Male winner

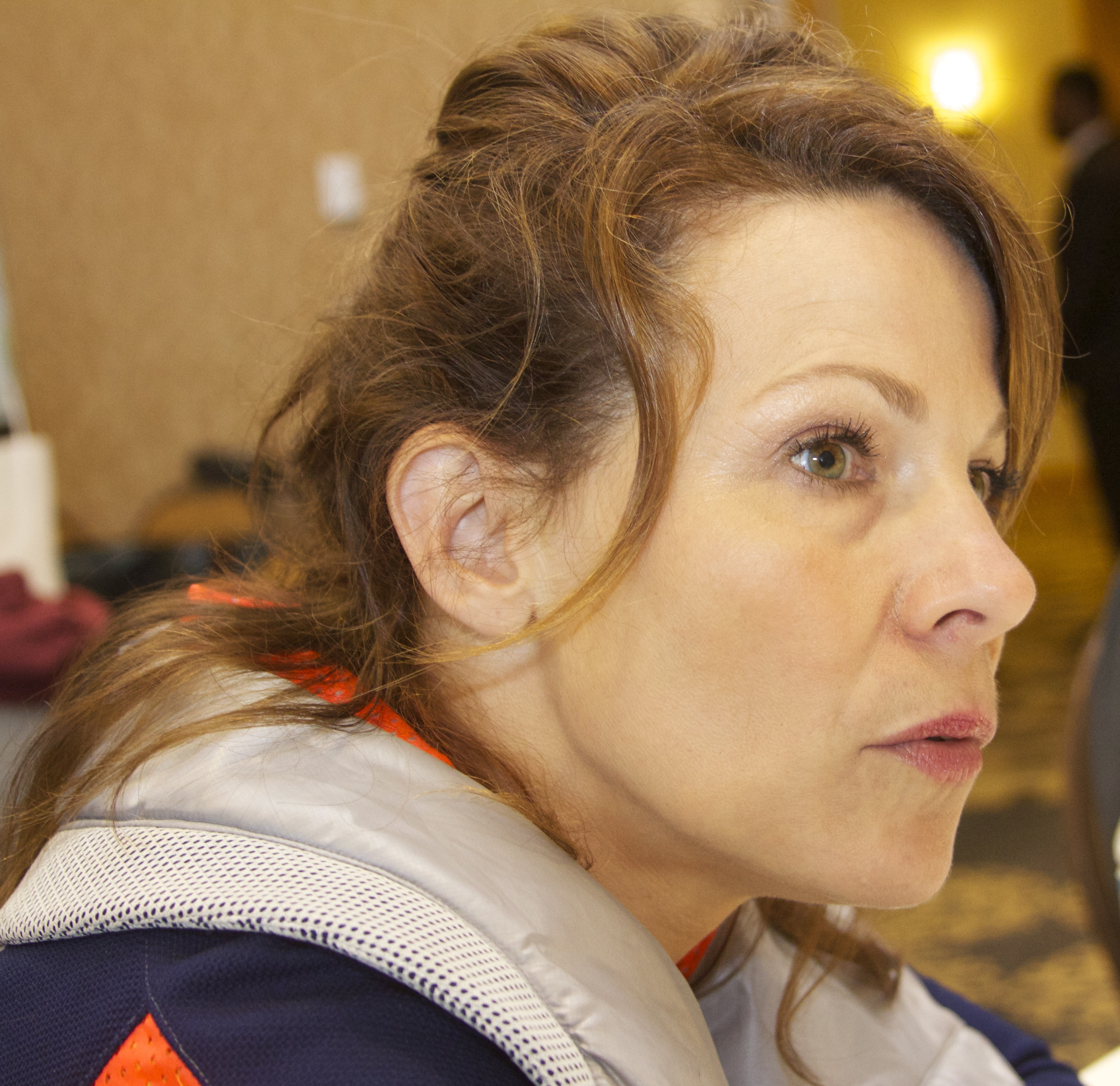
Lili Taylor, Best Supporting Female winner

Best Feature	Best Director
Short Cuts: Equinox; Much Ado About Nothing; Ruby in Paradise; The Wedding Banquet	Robert Altman – Short Cuts: Ang Lee – The Wedding Banquet; Victor Nuñez – Ruby in Paradise; Robert Rodriguez – El Mariachi; John Turturro – Mac
Best Male Lead	Best Female Lead
Jeff Bridges – American Heart: Vincent D'Onofrio – Household Saints; Mitchell Lichtenstein – The Wedding Banquet; Matthew Modine – Equinox; Tyrin Turner – Menace II Society	Ashley Judd – Ruby in Paradise: Suzy Amis – The Ballad of Little Jo; May Chin – The Wedding Banquet; Ariyan A. Johnson – Just Another Girl on the I.R.T.; Emma Thompson – Much Ado About Nothing
Best Supporting Male	Best Supporting Female
Christopher Lloyd – Twenty Bucks: David Chung – The Ballad of Little Jo; Tate Donovan – Inside Monkey Zetterland; Todd Field – Ruby in Paradise; Edward Furlong – American Heart	Lili Taylor – Household Saints: Lara Flynn Boyle – Equinox; Ah-Leh Gua – The Wedding Banquet; Lucinda Jenney – American Heart; Julianne Moore – Short Cuts
Best Screenplay	Best First Feature
Short Cuts – Robert Altman and Frank Barhydt: Combination Platter – Edwin Baker and Tony Chan; Household Saints – Nancy Savoca and Richard Guay; Ruby in Paradise – Victor Nuñez; The Wedding Banquet – Ang Lee, Neil Peng, and James Schamus	El Mariachi – Robert Rodriguez: American Heart; Combination Platter; Mac – John Turturro; Menace II Society – The Hughes Brothers
Best Cinematography	Best International Film
Menace II Society – Lisa Rinzler: American Heart – James R. Bagdonas; Chain of Desire – Nancy Schreiber; Equinox – Elliot Davis; Ruby in Paradise – Alex Vlacos	The Piano • Australia / New Zealand: Like Water for Chocolate • Mexico; Naked • UK; Orlando • UK; The Story of Qiu Ju • China / Hong Kong

== Films with multiple nominations and awards ==
=== Films that received multiple nominations ===
Nominations	Film
6	Ruby in Paradise
6	The Wedding Banquet
5	American Heart
4	Equinox
4	Short Cuts
3	Household Saints
3	Menace II Society
2	The Ballad of Little Jo
2	Combination Platter
2	El Mariachi
2	Mac
2	Much Ado About Nothing

=== Films that won multiple awards ===
Awards	Film
3	Short Cuts

== Special awards ==
=== John Cassavetes Award ===
- Jim Jarmusch

=== Special Distinction Award ===
- Sandra Schulberg
