= Marilyn Sides =

American novelist

Marilyn Sides is an American writer and a senior lecturer in the English Department of Wellesley College, Massachusetts where she teaches creative writing and literature courses.

Her collection of short stories, The Island of the Mapmaker's Wife and Other Tales (Harmony), was published in 1996. The title story was selected to appear in the 1990 O. Henry Prize Stories collection and inspired the 2001 British-Dutch feature film The Island of the Mapmaker's Wife by Michie Gleason. Her first novel, The Genius of Affection (Harmony), appeared in 1999.
