= Richard Emery =

Richard Emery may refer to:

- Richard David Emery, American lawyer
- Richard R. Emery, bishop of the Episcopal Diocese of North Dakota
- Dick Emery (Richard Gilbert Emery), English comedian and actor
