= Warlock (1989 film) =

1989 film by Steve Miner

- American theatrical release poster
- Directed by: Steve Miner
- Written by: David Twohy
- Produced by: Steve Miner
- Starring: Julian Sands; Lori Singer; Richard E. Grant
- Cinematography: David Eggby
- Edited by: David Finfer
- Music by: Jerry Goldsmith
- Distributed by: Trimark Pictures (United States); New World Pictures (international)
- Release dates: May 1989 (Cannes); June 1989 (Australia and United Kingdom); January 11, 1991 (United States)
- Running time: 103 minutes
- Country: United States
- Language: English
- Budget: $15 million
- Box office: $9 million

Warlock is a 1989 American supernatural horror film directed by Steve Miner and written by David Twohy. Julian Sands stars as the title character, a son of Satan who travels from the late 17th century to the modern era with the mission of destroying the world. Lori Singer and Richard E. Grant co-star as a 20th-century woman and a 17th-century witch-hunter attempting to stop him, respectively.

The film was released internationally in 1989 but did not receive an American release until January 11, 1991. It received mixed reviews and grossed $9 million on a $15 million budget. Two sequels followed, with Sands reprising his role in the first sequel Warlock: The Armageddon (1993), although both sequels serve as standalone films with no connection to the original.

== Plot ==
The Warlock is taken captive in Boston, Massachusetts in 1691 by witch-hunter Giles Redferne. The Warlock is sentenced to death for his activities, including the death of Redferne's wife, but Satan propels the Warlock forward in time to late-20th-century Los Angeles, California. Redferne follows through the portal.

When the Warlock crash-lands at the house of a waitress named Kassandra and her roommate, Chas, he is taken in by them. While Kassandra is out, the Warlock murders Chas. The Warlock confronts a fake psychic, tricking her into allowing herself to be possessed by Satan, who tells him to reassemble The Grand Grimoire, a book separated into three pieces and that can unmake Creation. Ripping out the psychic's eyes and using them as a compass, the Warlock finds the first piece of the Grand Grimoire hidden inside an antique table at Kassandra's home.

While there, he places an ageing curse upon her and takes her bracelet. Redferne arrives with a "witch compass" to track the Warlock. After Redferne explains some basic rules of witches and warlocks, such as their weakness to purified salt, Kassandra follows him to regain her bracelet, which will allow her to become young again. The Warlock acquires the power of flight by murdering an unbaptized boy.

Redferne and Kassandra pursue the Warlock to the rural home of a Mennonite family, where the Warlock has located the second piece of the Grimoire. After a battle with Redferne, the Warlock attempts to fly away but is struck down by a weather vane made of cold iron. Redferne, Kassandra, and the Mennonite couple attempt to bind the Warlock with a pair of manacles that will stop him from using his power. Still, the Warlock hexes the Mennonite farmer with the Evil Eye before escaping on foot.

Redferne gives Kassandra a blessed hammer to hammer nails into the Warlock's footprints while he and the farmer's wife carry the ailing farmer back to the house. While the Warlock sheds his shackles, Kassandra hammers nails into his footprints, causing the Warlock agony. He escapes by train, but Kassandra recovers her bracelet, restoring her youth. The farmer is terribly injured, but Redferne leaves him a cure in the form of bronze keys. Kassandra is persuaded to continue when Redferne tells her that the Warlock intends to destroy the universe.

They follow the Warlock to Boston, where the final piece of the Grimoire is supposed to be buried on sacred earth. They arrive at the church where the Grimoire is held and warn the pastor that the Warlock is coming for it. The pastor reassures Redferne and Kassandra that the book is buried in sacred earth, directing them to a graveyard. Kassandra realizes that due to construction, many coffins have been moved to a part of the graveyard that is not consecrated ground. They find Redferne's coffin and break it open to get the Grimoire when the Warlock arrives and forces the pastor to reveal the location of the book by threatening to give his wife a miscarriage.

Redferne carries the book onto hallowed ground, but the Warlock threatens to kill Kassandra if Redferne does not bring him the book. Redferne challenges the Warlock to a fair fight without weapons or magic, and the Warlock agrees. He flings Kassandra into a lake, and he and Redferne fight. The Warlock gains the upper hand, and Redferne cheats by throwing soil from the sacred ground in the Warlock's face. With the rules broken, the Warlock uses his magical abilities to subdue Redferne and claim possession of the final third of the Grimoire, with the true name of God being revealed in the book.

Before the Warlock can use the Grimoire to say the name of God in reverse, Kassandra stabs him in the neck with the syringe she uses to inject insulin, which she filled with salt water from the lake. The Warlock's throat seals shut, and he bursts into flames. Redferne and Kassandra bid one another farewell before Redferne returns to his own time. Kassandra buries the Grimoire in the middle of the Bonneville Salt Flats.

== Cast ==
- Julian Sands as Warlock
- Lori Singer as Kassandra
- Richard E. Grant as Giles Redferne
- Mary Woronov as Channeler
- Kevin O'Brien as Chas
- Richard Kuss as Mennonite
- Rob Paulsen as gas station attendant
- Brandon Call as unbaptized young boy

== Production ==
Screenwriter David Twohy first conceived the story as a reversal of what the film ultimately became. "I spent, if not wasted, a good six to eight weeks trying to make the warlock somebody who was persecuted during the witch craze of the 17th century, and came forward to this time and experienced much the same persecution here for other reasons," he commented to Cinefantastique Magazine. Twohy revised and refined the story, but he had to compromise some of his ideas due to limitations of the budget.

Because the film begins in the colonial United States, director Steve Miner insisted that the leads be portrayed by British actors. "They'd been off the boat for five years, ten years at most. They're English," he said. Producer Arnold Kopelson suggested Julian Sands, but it was director Miner who decided to cast Sands against type as the evil Warlock instead of goodhearted Redferne.

Sands had been offered many roles in horror movies and initially wasn't interested. "When I first got the script, it sat around for a while because I didn't think it was my kind of thing," Sands remarked in a 1991 interview. "When I read it, I saw it was a black comedy rather than a slasher-type film [and] was very happy at the prospect of working with Steve." With Sands committed to star, Miner's idea of casting Withnail & I star Richard E. Grant as the Warlock could have fallen through but he decided to audition him anyway and was so impressed that Grant was given the role of Redferne.

Problems arose with actress Lori Singer, who was reportedly difficult, causing particular difficulty for makeup man Carl Fullerton. An elaborate series of makeups to progressively age Singer had been designed, tested and approved. However, on the day of her transformation into a 40-year-old, Singer refused to wear any prosthetics, forcing the makeup men to resort to stippling, shadowing and having the actress don a gray wig. For her 60-year-old incarnation, she agreed to wear prosthetics on her cheeks and chin but refused to let them put appliances on her nose or eyes.

The bulk of the movie was shot on location around the United States. The opening 17th-century sequence was filmed at Plimoth Plantation, a living history museum in Massachusetts, and later scenes were shot in the Boston area. Parts of the film were also shot at the Bonneville Salt Flats in Utah. The farmhouse with the iconic red barn is the George Washington Faulkner House, which was open to the public with an annual pumpkin patch attraction for many years. Because of the logistics of the special effects involved, however, a graveyard was erected on a soundstage in Los Angeles for the climactic finale.

The post-production optical effects work was to have been supplied by Dreamquest Images but they were replaced by Perpetual Motion for budgetary reasons. The Warlock possesses the ability to conjure bolts of ectoplasm that he hurls at unsuspecting foes, but this proved problematic and had to be toned down since it could only be achieved through animation. No one from Perpetual Motion was available to supervise on the set, so the crew had to shoot background plates and plot the effects on their own and hope that the FX team had the proper materials to work with.

=== Deleted scenes ===
Due to a variety of factors, several scenes were cut, reshot or altered in post-production. Several deleted scenes are glimpsed in the theatrical trailer and other photographs and information have surfaced. These include an original version of the death of the channeler that was cut after poor reception of the special effects at test screenings, leading to a reshot version of the scene. Another deleted scene shows the Warlock using a spell involving a chicken to track Redferne and Kassandra. A version of the scene remains in the novelization.

== Release ==
Although completed in 1988 and released to other countries the following year, Warlock fell into release limbo in the United States when New World Pictures suffered financial difficulties, and it was shelved for two years. The film was eventually picked up by Trimark Pictures and given a limited release beginning in January 1991. The film turned into a modest success for Trimark, grossing $9,094,451 and becoming the company's biggest grosser until Eve's Bayou.

== Reception ==
The film received mixed reviews, and was heavily compared to The Terminator. Despite a variety of issues with the projection during his viewing, New York Times critic Vincent Canby praised the film as "unexpectedly entertaining, having been concocted with comic imagination." People wrote it was "modestly entertaining low-budget fantasy adventure — distraction enough if you're not in too demanding a mood." On the flip-side, Los Angeles Times critic Michael Wilmington claimed there was "No wit or humanity, or even any genuine horror."

Entertainment Weekly denounced the special effects for being "so low-budget they might have come out of a joke shop," and TV Guide declared that the "aging make-up used to show the effects of Kassandra's curse is not at all effective—a particular problem in that she's a major character and is on screen much of the time." Richard Harrington of The Washington Post remarked that the film was "...a surprisingly old-fashioned horror adventure that benefits from the superbly malevolent presence of Julian Sands as said warlock" while also applauding the absence of jump-cuts typically used in the genre and lively period dialogue.

On the review aggregation website Rotten Tomatoes, 56% of 18 reviews are positive, with an average rating of 5.2/10. On Metacritic, the film has a weighted average score of 44 out of 100 based on 15 critics, indicating "mixed or average reviews".

== Soundtrack ==
Warlock

Soundtrack album by Jerry Goldsmith
- Released: 1989
- Genre: Soundtrack
- Length: 53:48
- Label: Intrada/Silva Screen Records

Warlock (Expanded)

Soundtrack album by Jerry Goldsmith
- Released: 2015
- Genre: Soundtrack
- Length: 72:02
- Label: Intrada Records

Jerry Goldsmith's score for the film was released in the United States by Intrada and in the UK by Silva Screen Records in 1989. Running roughly 54 minutes, these original releases featured numerous deviations from the final film versions and several cues were omitted. In March 2015, Intrada Records released a 72-minute "expanded" score restored from the 2" masters of the original recording sessions.

== Legacy ==
=== Sequels ===
A sequel was made in 1993 titled Warlock: The Armageddon, again starring Julian Sands. Although Sands portrayed the same character, there was no other through-line. "Our film is a totally different story from the original Warlock," commented director Anthony Hickox. "It's as though the original film didn't happen." A second, direct-to-video sequel called Warlock III: The End of Innocence was released in 1999, again with no direct ties to the films which preceded it. Bruce Payne starred in the title role.

=== Adaptations ===
The screenplay was adapted into a novel by Ray Garton, released by Avon Books in 1989. This novelization includes additional/alternate details which didn't make it into the final cut of the movie.

As part of a deal with Lions Gate Entertainment, Bluewater Productions released a Warlock comic book series in 2009. The 4-issue series featured an original storyline with the Warlock on a mission to destroy a book which had imprisoned a group of his peers. The series contained a few references to the original film and one of the two covers of the first issue was derived from the movie's poster art, but the company was unable to attain the rights to use Julian Sands' likeness. "The Warlock character in the comic series definitely has similar character traits to Sands' Warlock, but I decided to make him a different character," remarked writer Nick Lyons.

Acclaim Entertainment released a video game based on the films for the Super NES and Sega Genesis in 1995. The makers of the game eschewed the plot of the original film and chose to put the focus on elements of the first sequel, such as the druids and runestones.

=== Copycat murder ===
In La Ronge, Saskatchewan in 1995, 14-year-old Sandy Charles told police that he had been contemplating suicide but "a spirit" told him to kill someone else. On July 8, Charles and an unnamed 8-year-old accomplice murdered 7-year-old Johnathan Thimpsen. In court, lawyers on Charles' behalf argued that he had become obsessed with the film Warlock and that the murder was based in part on occult concepts from the movie. The case brought the issue of violence in movies to the forefront in Charles' native Canada and is reported to have influenced the country's decision to enable parents to use the V-chip to censor violence in cable television.

Because of their ages, Charles was put on trial as an adult and his accomplice, identified in court only by the initial M., was not charged. In August 1996, Charles was found not guilty by reason of insanity. Following his trial he went on to reside at the high security Regional Psychiatric Centre in Saskatoon and was briefly relocated to the Saskatchewan Hospital in June 2013, but was transferred back to the RPC facility that September.
