= Sunset Grill (film) =

- DVD cover
- Directed by: Kevin Connor
- Written by: Chip Walter; Marcus Wright; Faruque Ahmed
- Produced by: Faruque Ahmed
- Starring: Peter Weller; Lori Singer; Stacy Keach; Alexandra Paul; John Rhys-Davies
- Cinematography: Douglas Milsome
- Edited by: Barry Peters
- Music by: Ken Thorne
- Production companies: The Movie Group; Cinema Studio
- Distributed by: New Line Cinema
- Release date: March 3, 1993
- Running time: 103 minutes
- Country: United States
- Language: English

Sunset Grill is a 1993 American neo-noir mystery film directed by Kevin Connor and starring Peter Weller as a private detective in Los Angeles. It co-stars Lori Singer and Stacy Keach.

== Plot ==
Ryder Hart is a private investigator and former police officer who is down on his luck and drinks too much alcohol. His estranged wife Anita runs the Sunset Grill, a bar and restaurant. Anita is romantically involved with Jeff Carruthers, a Los Angeles police detective who formerly worked with Hart.

Carruthers introduces Hart to a wealthy businessman, Harrison Shelgrove, and his alluring assistant Loren. When someone close to them is murdered, Hart and Carruthers team up to try to solve the crime. In the course of their investigation, they uncover another mystery involving illegal immigrants from Mexico, including two who worked at the Sunset Grill.

== Cast ==
- Peter Weller as Ryder Hart, a private detective with a drinking problem
- Lori Singer as Loren Duquesne, assistant to Harrison Shelgrove
- Stacy Keach as Harrison Shelgrove, a wealthy oil executive and philanthropist
- Alexandra Paul as Anita Hart, Hart's estranged wife
- John Rhys-Davies as Joe Stockton, a corrupt INS officer
- Michael Anderson, Jr. as Jeff Carruthers, a police lieutenant and Anita's love interest
- Randy Pelish as Dr. Tarbus, a medical researcher whose work is financed by Shelgrove
- Pete Koch as Christian, a thug
- Michael Medeiros as Mule, a thug who works with Christian
- Richard Coca as Ricardo, an employee of the Sunset Grill restaurant and bar
- Michael Fernandes as Ramon, a leader of the undocumented immigrant community
- Kelly Jo Minter as Joanna Ramirez, an INS officer and Stockton's partner
- Daniel Addes as Victor
- Benito Martinez as Guillermo, an employee of the Sunset Grill
- Woodford Croft as Mr. Pietrowski, a client of Hart
- Sandra Wild as Mrs. Pietrowski, the subject of one of Hart's investigations
