= Summer Heat (1987 film) =

1987 film by Michie Gleason

- Theatrical release poster
- Directed by: Michie Gleason
- Written by: Michie Gleason
- Produced by: William Tennant
- Starring: Lori Singer; Anthony Edwards; Bruce Abbott; Kathy Bates; Clu Gulager
- Cinematography: Elliot Davis
- Edited by: Mary Bauer
- Music by: Richard Stone
- Release date: May 29, 1987
- Running time: 80 minutes
- Country: United States
- Language: English
- Box office: $350,481

Summer Heat is a 1987 American independent romantic crime drama film written and directed by Michie Gleason, with a screenplay by Michie Gleason based on the novel Here to Get My Baby Out of Jail by Louise Shivers. It stars Lori Singer, Anthony Edwards, Bruce Abbott, and Kathy Bates.

== Plot ==
In 1937, Roxy Walston is only 17 when she marries a boy she knows, Aaron. They have a child (called Baby) and live and work on a farm that raises tobacco outside of Tarboro, North Carolina.

Roxy's father, who operates a mortuary, sends a young drifter named Jack Ruffin their way to be a farmhand. Jack has an affair with Roxy, with tragic results.

== Cast ==
- Lori Singer as Roxy Walston
- Anthony Edwards as Aaron Walston
- Bruce Abbott as Jack Ruffin
- Kathy Bates as Ruth
- Clu Gulager as Will
- Dorothy McGuire as Narrator (voice)

== Production ==
Filming took place on location in and around the cities of Tarboro, Wilson, Robersonville, Nashville in Eastern North Carolina. A working tobacco farm in Conetoe, North Carolina was used as the family tobacco farm in the film.
