= Beyond Conviction =

- Film poster
- Directed by: Rachel Libert
- Produced by: Rachel Libert; Jedd Wider; Todd Wider
- Cinematography: Hope Hall; Tony Hardmon
- Edited by: Melissa Hacker
- Music by: Mark Orton
- Release date: June 23, 2006 (LAFF)
- Running time: 95 minutes
- Language: English

Beyond Conviction is a 2006 documentary film directed and produced by Rachel Libert that tells the story of three crime victims as they prepare to meet the people who committed these crimes. The film follows participants in a program based on the principles of restorative justice, run by the state of Pennsylvania, in which victims of the most violent crimes meet face-to-face with their perpetrators.

In 2006, the film was presented at the Los Angeles Film Festival, the Woodstock Film Festival, the Viennale, and the Leeds Film Festival. The film tied for the Audience Choice Award for Documentary Feature with Dixie Chicks: Shut Up and Sing at the Woodstock Film Festival.
