= Chip Walter =

American writer

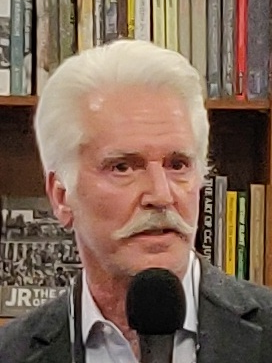
Walter in 2020

William J. (Chip) Walter Jr. (born May 23, 1951) is an author, journalist, National Geographic Fellow, educator, filmmaker and former CNN bureau chief. He has written five mainstream science books between 1991 and 2019. Walter was one of the original employees at CNN when it went on the air June 1, 1980 and later became its youngest bureau chief when he created CNN's first Southeast Bureau in 1981 before heading up the network's San Francisco Bureau in 1982. He has written and produced several PBS science documentaries, served as an adjunct professor at Carnegie Mellon University in three different departments, worked with UNICEF on the issue of childhood trauma, spoken at Harvard, Xerox PARC, Carnegie Mellon University and the Chautauqua Institution. One of his three original screenplays was produced and released under the title Sunset Grill in 1993 starring Peter Weller, Lori Singer and Stacy Keach. In 2015 his feature story for National Geographic Magazine explored the origins of human art and symbolic thinking.

== Career ==
After departing CNN Walter wrote and produced several award-winning documentaries for PBS including two programs for the Emmy Award-winning science series Planet Earth (1986) and another for Infinite Voyage (1986-1989 series), the first PBS series to air on both public and commercial television. He also wrote and produced a college-credit tele course which followed the Planet Earth series. His program "Fires of the Mind," was the first show publicly premiered for the Infinite Voyage series. It dealt with the evolution of human intelligence and creativity, themes Walter has returned to many times in his work. Variety called the documentary "Handsomely produced, beautifully written...a fascinating hour." The Village Voice wrote that it delivered " a sense of human accomplishment, which is the true ambition of science on the air."

Beginning in 1989, Walter developed a new series for WQED entitled Space Age to celebrate the International Space Year in 1992, the quincentenary of Christopher Columbus's voyage to the New World in 1492. The multimillion-dollar six part series, which was PBS's primetime series in the fall of 1992, was hosted by Patrick Stewart. Walter went on to write the series' companion book by the same title published by Random House in 1992 under the name William J. Walter Jr. The Houston Post called the book "lucid, well-written and well thought out."

Following forays into Hollywood screenwriting and digital media in the early and mid-1990s, Walter wrote his next book in collaboration with William Shatner, well known for his iconic role as Captain Kirk in the original Star Trek television series, and then later in a series of Star Trek movies. The book explored the many ways that the technologies predicted in the Star Trek series, like handheld communicators, virtual reality, wearable computers, humanlike robots and radical life extension were becoming a reality two hundred years before the 23rd century in which the series was set. The book combined reminiscences and history of the original series with explorations of advanced technologies being developed at MIT, Carnegie Mellon University, Xerox PARC, Kurzweil Technologies and as part of the Human Genome Project. Walter knew Carnegie Mellon University professor Randy Pausch and arranged to visit Pausch's lab as part of the book's research. His work was featured in the book's chapter on the Holodeck and virtual reality. Pausch later credited Walter with fulfilling one of his lifelong dreams—meeting Captain Kirk, when he gave his famous "Last Lecture" before dying in 2008 from pancreatic cancer.

He has also served on the faculty at Carnegie Mellon University at the Mellon Institute of Science, the School of Fine Arts and the Entertainment Technology Center at the School of Computer Science. In 1994 he pioneered early children's learning games with the launch of Digital Alchemy. The company later created the first GeoBee learning game for the National Geographic Society.

Walter has published four mainstream science books on a wide variety of subjects. His 2006 book, Thumbs, Toes and Tears–And Other Traits That Make Us Human was translated into five languages. "Last Ape Standing" has been published into three non-English languages, Chinese, Japanese and Spanish. He has written for a variety of national and international publications including National Geographic Magazine, The Economist, Slate, The Wall Street Journal, Scientific American, Scientific American Mind, Discover, and many others.

== Bibliography ==
- Walter, Chip: Immortality, Inc.: Renegade Science, Silicon Valley Billions, and the Quest to Live Forever. Washington, DC: National Geographic, 2020. According to WorldCat, book is held in 183 libraries
- Walter, Chip: Last Ape Standing: The Seven-Million Year Story of How and Why We Survived. New York: Walker & Company, 2013. According to WorldCat, book is held in 956 libraries
- Walter, Chip: Thumbs, Toes, and Tears: And Other Traits That Make Us Human. New York: Walker & Co, 2006. According to WorldCat, the book is held in 1006 libraries
- Walter, William J.: Space Age. New York: Random House, 1992. According to WorldCat, book is held in 1027 libraries
- Shatner, William; Walter, Chip: Star Trek. A Trek from Science Fiction to Science Fact. New York: Pocket Books, 2002. According to WorldCat, held in 624 libraries

== Magazine articles ==
Walter, Chip (January 2015). "The First Artists" National Geographic Magazine.

Walter, Chip (August 2005). "Kryder's Law" Scientific American.

Walter, Chip (January 2005). "You Robot" Scientific American.

Walter, Chip (July 2007). Scientific American.

== Speeches and talks ==
- Chautauqua Institution, June 27, 2013, "Last of the Apes" (See the talk.)
- CREATE Festival, DATA Awards, May 2013

== Writing ==
Walter has written popular books and magazine articles on a wide range of scientific topics and often crossed traditional academic boundaries in the process. Space Age, his first book was both a history of space exploration and ruminations and explorations of what might lie ahead as humans continue to look beyond their own world. It covered everything from rocket propulsion and life on other planets to the psychological challenges of making long journeys to Mars. His book with William Shatner, I'm Working on That was both a humorous look at the science of Star Trek and an investigation of human curiosity in general, not to mention explanations of time travel, artificial intelligence and the search for immortality. In his book Thumbs, Toes and Tears and Other Traits That Make Us Human, he investigated the origins and evolution of uniquely human traits that differentiate Homo sapiens from other creatures. In the book's epilogue he also looked to the future and wondered what the next stage of human evolution might bring. It was here that he coined the term "cybersapiens" or "Cyber sapiens" which he saw as the next human species, creatures that would be part biology and part machine, thinking developed out of the writings of Hans Moravec, Ray Kurzweil and Eric Drexler. The term comes from the Greek word kyber meaning rudder or controller, and sapiens (Latin for wisdom or knowledge). So not "wise human" as in Homo sapiens, but Cyber sapiens, creatures part biological and part technological taking control of wisdom and knowledge. He speculated in more detail on this in the final chapter of his most recent book Last Ape Standing, entitled "The Next Human.". Last Ape Standing told the story of all human evolution including the 27 human species that have evolved over the past 7 million years, and answered the question, "Why did we alone, of all of these species, survive?" A version of "The Next Human" was also published in Popular Science.

Walter coined another phrase that entered popular culture when he wrote a profile of Mark Kryder, an expert and inventor from Carnegie Mellon University of computer hard drive technology for Scientific American magazine in 2005. In the article Kryder argued that just as Moore's Law accurately predicted the exponential advancement of computer chip technology, hard drive technology was advancing at an even more rapid pace. In the article Walter called this "Kryder's Law" and the term stuck.

== Children ==
Walter has two daughters, Molly and Hannah, and two step-children, Steven and Annie.
