= Todd Wider =

American film producer

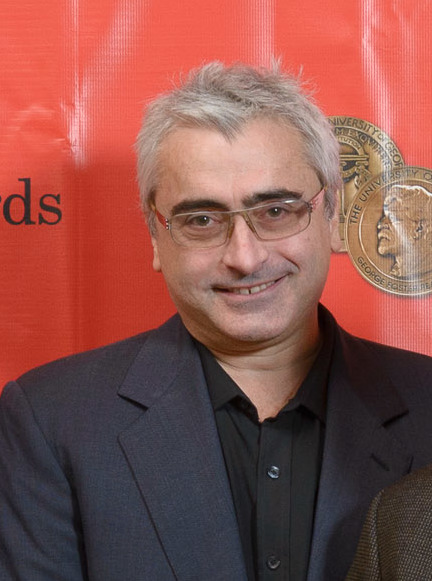
Todd Wider at the 73rd Annual Peabody Awards

Todd Wider is an American plastic surgeon and Emmy Award–winning film producer based in New York, who is active in documentary filmmaking.

== Education ==
He graduated from Ward Melville High School in 1982, Princeton University in 1986, and Columbia College of Physicians and Surgeons in 1990.

== Medicine ==
As a surgeon, he was active in helping the passage of the Women's Health and Cancer Act of 1998, federal legislation signed into law by President Bill Clinton, mandating insurance coverage for breast cancer reconstruction. He also was a volunteer surgeon for Victims Services, an organization providing surgery to victims of abuse, and was a volunteer surgeon at Ground Zero after the September 11, 2001 attacks in New York City.

== Films ==
As a film producer, Wider has produced, with his brother Jedd, Beyond Conviction (2006), a documentary about restorative justice in the Pennsylvania prison system that premiered on MSNBC, was featured on Oprah, and won a number of awards. Wider also produced What Would Jesus Buy? (2007), a Morgan Spurlock film about consumerism in the United States that focuses on the performance artist Billy Talen. He is also an executive producer of Taxi to the Dark Side (2007), a documentary about prisoner abuse directed by Alex Gibney that won the Academy Award for Best Documentary of 2008. Taxi to the Dark Side also won an Emmy for Best Documentary of 2008. Wider also produced The Untyings (2006), a film about exorcism in Romania and A Dream in Doubt (2006), directed by Tami Yeager, a documentary about intolerance in the wake of the September 11 attacks that focuses on a Sikh family in Arizona. In addition, he produced Kicking It (2007), a documentary about the Homeless World Cup, an international tournament for the homeless football league, which premiered at the Sundance Film Festival in 2008, and features Colin Farrell and the music of U2.

He also produced A Time to Stir which screened as a work-in-progress at the 2008 Toronto International Film Festival and concerns the Columbia University 1968 student uprisings, and Client #9: The Rise and Fall of Eliot Spitzer (2010), who was shortlisted for Academy Award consideration for Best Documentary of 2010. Wider also produced Semper Fi, Always Faithful, about water contamination at the Camp Lejeune Marine base and one Marine's crusade to find justice for his daughter, which premiered at the Tribeca Film Festival 2011. Semper Fi, Always Faithful was shortlisted for Academy Award consideration for Best Documentary of 2011. He also produced Mea Maxima Culpa: Silence in the House of God, a feature documentary directed by Alex Gibney, which was shortlisted for Academy Award consideration for Best Documentary of 2012 and won three Primetime Emmys in 2013 including one for exceptional merit in documentary filmmaking. Wider also produced Kings Point, which was nominated for an Academy Award for Best Documentary (Short Subject) in 2012.

Wider's directorial debut, God Knows Where I Am premiered to critical acclaim, and screened in cities and film festivals all over the world, winning numerous awards, including the Special Jury Prize for International Feature at Hot Docs Canadian International Documentary Festival. The documentary premiered and was nationally broadcast on PBS stations and Netflix in 2018.

== Sources ==
- Petruccelli, Justin (June 24, 2008). "A Wider View". Entrepreneur.
- "30th Annual News & Documentary Emmy Awards Winners Announced at New York City Gala". emmyonline.tv. Archived from the original on September 21, 2010.
