= Board of Estimate of City of New York v. Morris =

- Supreme Court of the United States

Argued December 7, 1988 Decided March 22, 1989
- Full case name: Board of Estimate of City of New York, et al. v. Morris, et al.
- Citations: 489 U.S. 688 (more) 109 S. Ct. 1433; 103 L. Ed. 2d 717

Holding
- The Board of Estimate's structure is inconsistent with the Equal Protection Clause of the Fourteenth Amendment because, although the boroughs have widely disparate populations, each has equal representation on the board.

Court membership
- Chief Justice William Rehnquist Associate Justices William J. Brennan Jr. · Byron White; Thurgood Marshall · Harry Blackmun; John P. Stevens · Sandra Day O'Connor; Antonin Scalia · Anthony Kennedy

Case opinions
- Majority: White, joined by Rehnquist, Marshall, O'Connor, Scalia, Kennedy
- Concurrence: Brennan, joined by Stevens
- Concurrence: Blackmun

Laws applied
- U.S. Const. amend XIV

Board of Estimate of City of New York v. Morris, 489 U.S. 688 (1989), was a case argued before the United States Supreme Court regarding the constitutionality of the New York City Board of Estimate. The Court invoked the one person, one vote principle emanating from the Equal Protection Clause; extending the principle in Reynolds v. Sims to municipal government, the Board's structure was ruled to be unconstitutional. It was subsequently abolished by an amendment to the New York City Charter.

== Background ==
Under the charter of the City of Greater New York established in 1898, the Board of Estimate was responsible for budget and land-use decisions for the city. It was composed of eight ex officio members: the Mayor of New York City, the New York City Comptroller and the President of the New York City Council, each of whom was elected citywide and had two votes, and the five Borough presidents, each having one vote.

In 1981, attorney Richard Emery recruited three NYC women to file suit that the board was unconstitutional, an unpopular opinion at the time that lost in its first district court hearing. The ruling was later reversed on appeal, and the city's counter was picked up by the Supreme Court in 1988.

== Opinion of the Court ==
The court unanimously declared the New York City Board of Estimate unconstitutional on the grounds that the city's most populous borough (Brooklyn) had no greater effective representation on the board than the city's least populous borough (Staten Island), in violation of the Fourteenth Amendment's Equal Protection Clause pursuant to the Court's 1964 "one man, one vote" decision (Reynolds v. Sims).

The case was argued on December 7, 1988, and decided on March 22, 1989. Justice Byron White delivered the Court's opinion.

Following the ruling, a commission was set up to revise the New York City Charter, which proposed a revised frame of government which abolished the Board and made the New York City Council the unicameral municipal legislature. This proposal (which also involved substantial reorganization of other parts of the city government) was accepted by 55% of city voters in a referendum held at the 1989 municipal election, and the Board ceased to exist on August 31, 1990.

== See also ==
- List of United States Supreme Court cases, volume 489
- List of United States Supreme Court cases
- Lists of United States Supreme Court cases by volume
- List of United States Supreme Court cases by the Rehnquist Court
- One Person, One Vote
