= Lori Singer =

American actress and classical musician (born 1957)

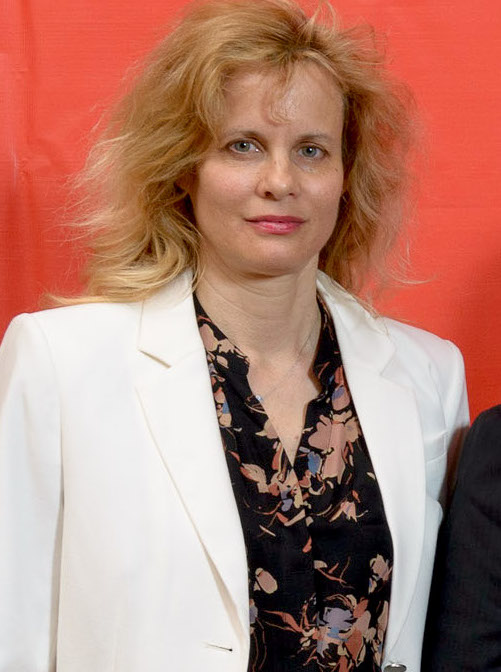
- Singer in 2014
- Born: November 6, 1957 (age 69); Corpus Christi, Texas, U.S.
- Education: Lincoln High School
- Alma mater: Juilliard School
- Occupations: Actress; musician
- Years active: 1982–present
- Known for: Fame; Footloose; The Falcon and the Snowman
- Height: 5 ft 10 in (1.78 m)
- Spouse: Richard David Emery (m. 1980; div. 1996)
- Children: 1
- Father: Jacques Singer
- Relatives: Marc Singer (brother)
- Website: www.lorisinger.com

Lori Singer (born November 6, 1957) is an American actress and musician. The daughter of conductor Jacques Singer, she was born in Corpus Christi, Texas, and raised in Portland, Oregon, where her father served as the lead conductor of the Oregon Symphony from 1962 to 1972. Singer was a musical prodigy, making her debut as a cellist with the Oregon Symphony at thirteen, and was subsequently accepted to the Juilliard School, where she became the institution's youngest graduate.

In the early 1980s, she signed with Elite Model Management before shifting her focus to acting. She was cast as Julie Miller, a teenage dancer and cellist, in the television series Fame, in which she appeared between 1982 and 1983. Singer gained notice for her lead role as Ariel Moore in the musical drama film Footloose (1984). She was later cast in supporting roles in John Schlesinger's drama The Falcon and the Snowman (1985), the comedy The Man with One Red Shoe (1985), the horror film Warlock (1989), and Robert Altman's ensemble drama Short Cuts (1993). She was nominated for the Independent Spirit Award for Best Female Lead for her performance in Trouble in Mind (1985).

== Early life ==
Singer was born November 6, 1957, in Corpus Christi, Texas, to Jacques Singer, a Polish-born conductor and protégé of Leopold Stokowski, and Leslie (née Wright), a concert pianist. She has a fraternal twin brother, Gregory, a violinist; and two older brothers: actor Marc, and Claude. At the time of her birth, Singer's father was working as the conductor of the Corpus Christi Symphony Orchestra. Singer is of Jewish descent.

When Singer was four years old, she relocated with her family to Portland, Oregon, where her father served as lead conductor of the Portland Symphony Orchestra from 1962 to 1972. Singer spent her formative years in Portland, and made her debut as a cello soloist at the age of thirteen with the Oregon Symphony. She attended Lincoln High School in Portland. In the summer of 1971, Singer and brother Gregory attended a summer music camp in New York led by cellist Yo-Yo Ma.

Singer was accepted into the Juilliard School at age fourteen, where she became the youngest graduate of the institution. After graduating from Juilliard, Singer performed with the Western Washington University Symphony Orchestra.

== Career ==
=== 1980–2006: Acting career ===
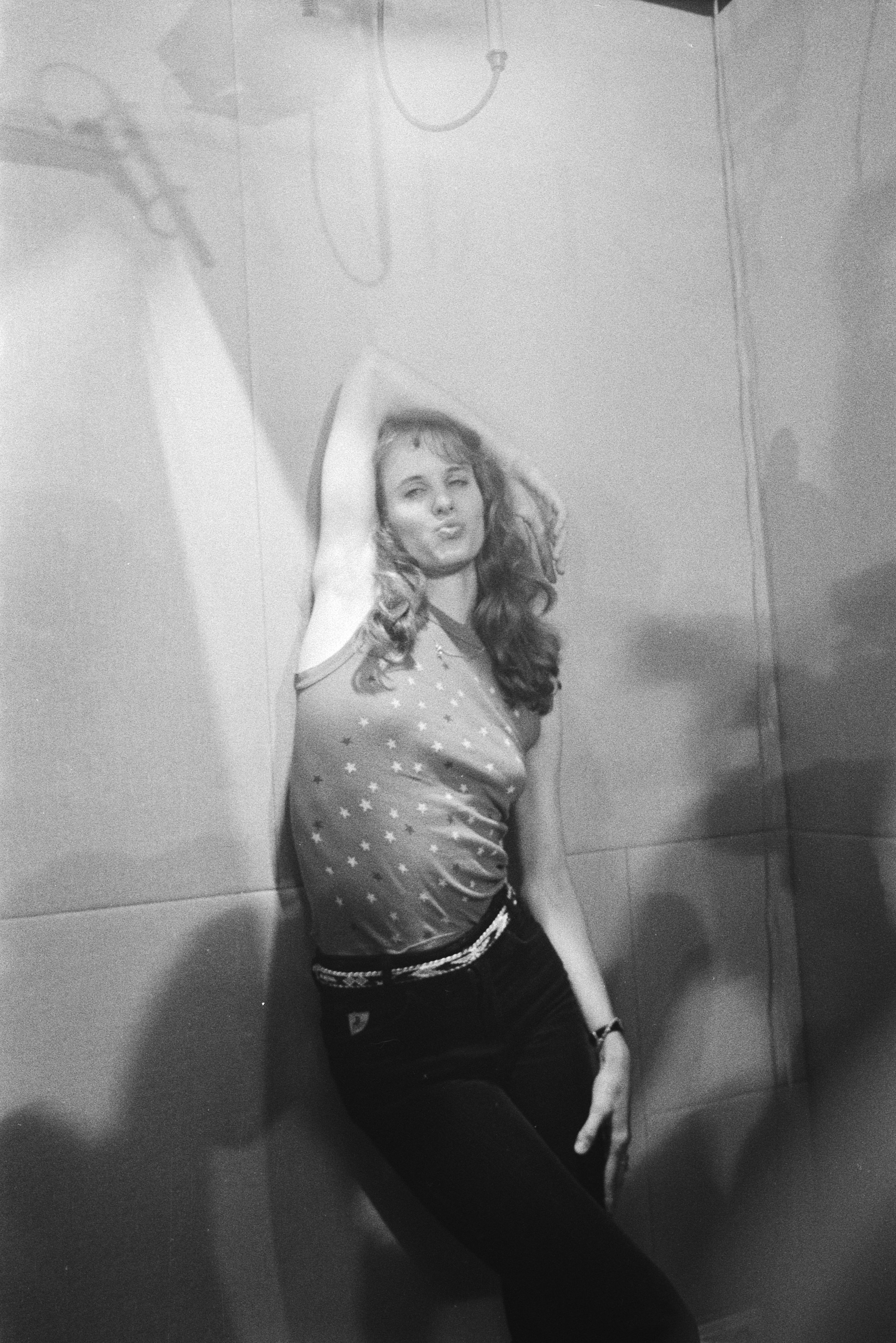
Singer from the television series Fame in 1983

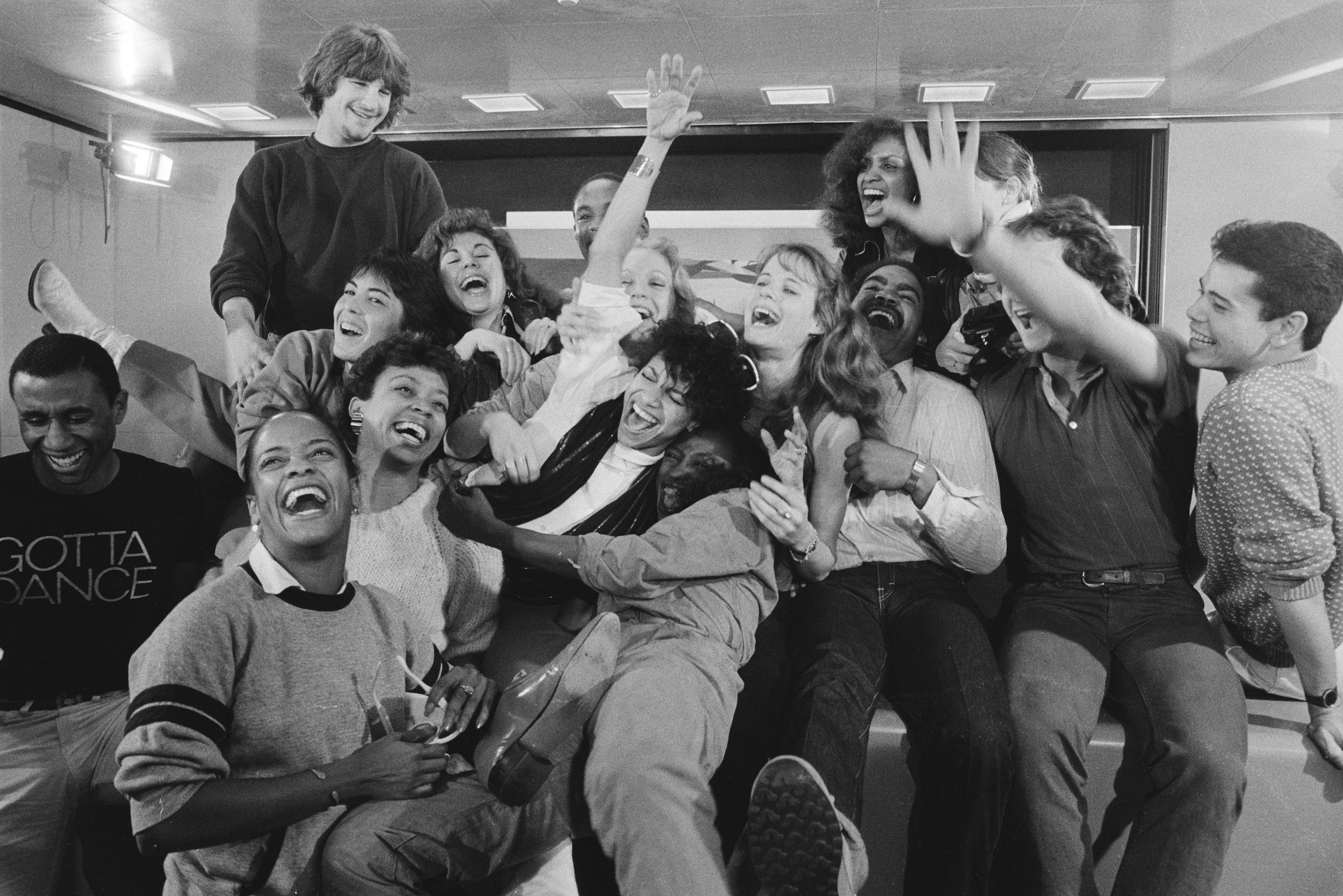
With the Kids from "Fame" (1983). Singer is in center, behind Debbie Allen

After completing her studies at Juilliard, Singer signed with Elite Modeling Agency. She continued to perform as a concert soloist, and in 1980 won the Bergen Philharmonic Competition. She subsequently shifted her focus to acting, inspired by her brother, Marc. Commenting on her decision to pursue a career as an actress, she said: "In a world where such terrible things are happening, it's just so fantastic to become someone else." In 1982, Singer was cast as Julie Miller, a shy high school student, in the television series Fame, and appeared in the first two seasons. The role of Miller, a teenage dancer and cellist, was written specifically for Singer's talents. In 1983, she and a number of other cast members—under the group name the Kids from "Fame"—performed a live concert at Royal Albert Hall, which was recorded and released as a live album.

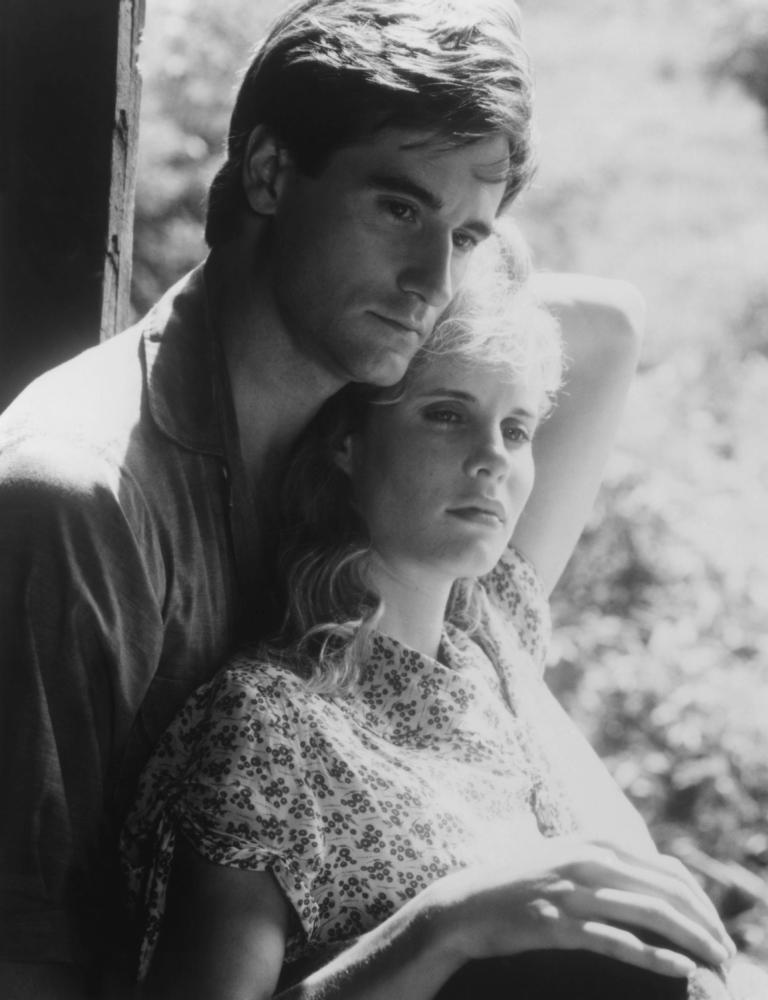
Singer with Bruce Abbott in Summer Heat (1987)

Singer starred in the television movie Born Beautiful (1983), for which was awarded Newcomer of the Year at ShoWest. One year later, she won the ShoWest Breakthrough Performer of the Year Award for her role as Ariel Moore, the female lead in Footloose (1984). She starred in a number of other movies, including The Falcon and the Snowman (1985) and The Man with One Red Shoe (1985). Her role in Trouble in Mind (1985) led to her nomination for an Independent Spirit Award for Best Female Lead.

Singer has also had roles in Summer Heat (1987), Warlock (1989), Equinox (1992), Sunset Grill (1993), the Robert Altman film Short Cuts (1993), and F.T.W. (1994). She was awarded a Golden Globe as an actor for "Best Ensemble" for Short Cuts.

The Short Cuts cast won awards for best ensemble at the 50th Venice International Film Festival and the 51st Golden Globe Awards. In 1995, she played Sydney Bloom, the lead character in the science fiction TV series VR.5. In addition to her acting, she produced Summer Heat and was involved in the creative conception of VR.5.

In 1997, Singer acted in the fourth episode of the series Inspired by Bach, where she also played the cello with Yo-Yo Ma, whose summer music camp she had attended in 1971.

=== 2007–present ===
Singer performed as a soloist at Carnegie Hall in January 2008, premiering a hymn written by Karl Jenkins in memory of Martin Luther King Jr.

In May 2011, Singer returned to television with a guest-starring role on Law & Order: Special Victims Unit.

In 2013, Singer executive produced with Sheila Nevins, HBO, and Jessica Kingdon the documentary Mea Maxima Culpa: Silence in the House of God, directed by Alex Gibney. In 2012 the film won the Grierson Award at the London Film Festival and it also won the Chicago International Film Festival's award. In 2013, the film won the Best Feature Documentary category in the Irish Film and Television Awards. In the United States, the film was nominated for five prime-time Emmy awards; it won three: Exceptional Merit in Documentary Film Making, Outstanding Writing, and Best Editor. The film was short-listed for the Academy Awards in 2013 and was nominated for a Writers Guild Award. In 2014 the documentary was awarded a Peabody Award. In 2017 she narrated the documentary God Knows Where I Am which won 17 film festivals, an Emmy and streamed on Netflix in 2019. She also performed "Linda's Song" with Paul Cantelone for the soundtrack of the film.

== Personal life ==
Singer married lawyer Richard David Emery in 1980. They divorced in 1996.

== Filmography ==
Year	Film	Role	Notes	Ref.
1983	Born Beautiful	Jodi Belcher	Television film ShoWest Newcomer of the Year Award	
1984	Footloose	Ariel Moore	ShoWest Breakthrough Performer of the Year Award	
1985	The Falcon and the Snowman	Lana		
1985	The Man with One Red Shoe	Maddy		
1985	Trouble in Mind	Georgia		
1987	Made in U.S.A.	Annie		
1987	Summer Heat	Roxie	Film	
1989	Warlock	Kassandra		
1990	Storm and Sorrow	Molly Higgins	Television film	
1992	Equinox	Sharon Ace		O
1993	Sunset Grill	Loren		
1993	Short Cuts	Zoe Trainer		
1994	F.T.W.	Scarlett Stuart		
1997	Sarabande	Dr France		
2004	When Will I Be Loved	Herself		
2005	Little Victim	Tracy	Short film	
2013	Mea Maxima Culpa: Silence in the House of God	N/A	Executive producer, Peabody Award winning documentary film	
2015	Experimenter	Florence Asch		
2017	The Institute	Madame Werner		
2017	God Knows Where I Am	Linda Bishop	Narration; title voice role, film role, cello soundtrack	
2023	Rachel Hendrix	Rachel Hendrix		

=== Television ===
Year	Film	Role	Notes	Ref.
1982–1983	Fame	Julie Miller	NBC Television series	
1990	American Playhouse	Therese	Episode: "Sensibility and Sense"	
1995	VR.5	Sydney Bloom	Television series	
1997	Inspired by Bach	Dr. Angela France	Episode: "Bach Cello Suite #4: Sarabande"	
2011	Law & Order: Special Victims Unit	Dede Aston	Television series (Season 12, Episode 22)	

=== Music videos ===
Year	Song	Artist	Notes	Ref.
1986	Heartbeat	Don Johnson		
1989	On Our Own	Bobby Brown		
