= God Knows Where I Am =

2016 film by Todd and Jedd Wider

- Directed by: Todd Wider; Jedd Wider
- Produced by: Todd Wider; Jedd Wider
- Narrated by: Lori Singer
- Cinematography: Gerardo Puglia
- Edited by: Keiko Deguchi
- Music by: Paul Cantelon; Ivor Guest; Robert Logan
- Production company: Wider Film Projects
- Release dates: April 30, 2016 (Hot Docs Canadian International Documentary Festival); March 31, 2017 (U.S.)
- Running time: 99 minutes
- Country: United States
- Language: English

God Knows Where I Am is a 2016 American documentary film directed and produced by Todd Wider and Jedd Wider and narrated by Lori Singer.

The film premiered to critical acclaim, and screened in cities and film festivals all over the world, winning numerous awards, including the Special Jury Prize for International Feature at Hot Docs Canadian International Documentary Festival.

The documentary premiered on PBS stations in USA, on October 15, 2018.

== Synopsis ==
In a vacant New Hampshire farmhouse, a homeless woman's body is found. A diary lies near the body which contains notes of starvation and mental illness. However, this diary also contains beauty, humor, and other positive things along with a spiritual touch. Linda Bishop had been a prisoner of her own mind for about four months, and while waiting for God to save her, she was surviving on apples and rain water, all in the midst of one of the coldest winters on record. The unfolding saga of her story is told from her own perspective, and the perspective of others, describing our systemic failure to protect the homeless and mentally ill.

== Production ==
=== Shooting in film: Using historical cameras ===
Filmmakers Jedd and Todd Wider explained why they used film, and why they chose different cameras film gauges for her situation and states of mind: "We wanted the audience to experience and feel a little of what Linda might have felt." When depicting Bishop's release from the hospital and her subsequent travels, they used 16mm on a 1966 Bolex and a 1972 Canon Scoopic, for a sense of her physical action and energy. They shot scenes where Bishop discusses food in her diary in Super 16mm with an Aaton XTR in order to convey a sense of nostalgia but also a dreamlike quality. In depicting the natural world she saw outside the window, they used 35mm film with 1939 Eyemo cameras, one of them spring-wound to convey a bit of unevenness. Instead of a sense of modernity, they tried to express the idealistic beauty of her surroundings. An Arriflex Alexa was also used for the nature scenes, and a Technocrane for "the meditations of a solitary soul moving through the interiors of the farmhouse and landscape." The interviews were shot in digital video.

=== Performance ===
An early challenge for the filmmakers was how to present Bishop's story in her own words. While they had no protagonist to interview, they did have Bishop's words, in the form of her diary. Actress Lori Singer spent considerable time with the real diary, even studying how the pen was imprinted onto the actual paper for clues as to what Bishop might have been experiencing. Singer created an entire character arc for Bishop. The performance helps the viewer enter into the mind of Bishop and feel for her, and she serves as the key guide, taking you on what becomes a tragic journey.

Singer's performance has been praised by critics. Greg Klymkiw of The Film Corner praised, "Singer's performance here is astonishing - she captures the pain, desperation and even small joys in Bishop's life during these sad, lonely days with a sensitivity and grace linked wholly to the "character" of Bishop." Andrew Parker of Toronto Film Scene said, "The actress steps inside Bishop so completely that it’s impossible not to sit in stunned silence listening to every word of the journals as they’re delivered." Jessica Kiang of Variety wrote, “A chilling exploration-The diaries are not just read but vocally embodied by Lori Singer in a vivid voiceover performance.”

== Release ==
The film premiered on April 30, 2016 at the 2016 Hot Docs Canadian International Documentary Festival. It later opened theatrically in the Spring of 2017 and played in multiple markets around the world. PBS stations will broadcast God Knows Where I Am nationwide on October 15, 2018.

== Reception and awards ==
In 2019, God Knows Where I Am won an Emmy Award for Outstanding Lighting Direction and Scenic Design.

The film received positive feedback from critics. Review aggregation website Rotten Tomatoes gives the film a score of 84% based on reviews from 25 critics. Christopher Orr of The Atlantic called the film "beautiful, evocative, and ultimately heartbreaking." Andy Webster of The New York Times named God Knows Where I Am a "New York Times Critic's Pick." Amy Ellis Nutt of The Washington Post praised the film as "remarkably moving." John DeFore of The Hollywood Reporter said the film was "haunting and uncommonly artful."

In 2016, God Knows Where I Am won the Special Jury Prize for Best International Feature Documentary at Hot Docs Canadian International Documentary Festival. Napa Valley Film Festival awarded the film with the Special Jury Award for Innovative Treatment of a Social Issue in a Documentary Feature. At the Salem Film Fest, God Knows Where I Am won the award for Best Cinematography from American Cinematographer. The film was also named Best Documentary Feature at the Maryland International Film Festival, New Hampshire Film Festival, and American Documentary Film Festival.
