= Broken English (1981 film) =

- Film poster
- Directed by: Michie Gleason
- Written by: Michie Gleason
- Produced by: Bert Schneider
- Starring: Beverly Ross; Jacques Martial; Oona O'Neill
- Cinematography: Elliot Davis
- Edited by: Suzanne Fenn
- Music by: Georges Delerue
- Distributed by: Lorimar Productions
- Release date: 1981
- Running time: 93 minutes
- Country: United States
- Language: English

Broken English is a 1981 drama film based on the theme of interracial romance. It is the only film to feature Oona O'Neill in an acting role.

== Plot ==
Partly subtitled, the film follows the story of Sarah, who comes under fire from her family, friends and colleagues when she marries an African man, Maas. When she discovers that Maas is part of an underground group of South African freedom fighters, she must analyze her own political and sexual beliefs.

== Cast ==
- Beverly Ross as Sarah
- Jacques Martial as Maas
- Greta Ronningen as Leslie
- Mansour Sy as Cheekh
- Oona O'Neill as Sarah's Mother
- Frankie Stein as Cecile
- Sandy Whitelaw as Arms Dealer
- Hassane Fall as Amidau
- Valérie Kling as Agency Woman
- Michel Nicolini as Merchant
- Serge Rynecki as Jacques
- Réginald Huguenin as Pat
- Makhete Diallo as Makhete

== Production ==
Broken English was the directorial debut of Michie Gleason. It was produced by Bert Schneider, whom Gleason had conflicts with; he insisted that his wife Greta Ronningen be cast in the film and pressured her to add more sex scenes.

Lorimar, the production company, refused to distribute the completed film because it was not sexually explicit enough. Schneider filed a successful lawsuit against them, but it would be his last picture as a producer. The film has never been shown or released outside of festival screenings.
