= Sandy Whitelaw =

British actor, producer, director and subtitler

Alexander "Sandy" Whitelaw (28 April 1930 – 20 February 2015) was a British actor, producer, director and subtitler.

== Early life ==
Whitelaw was born in London and educated in Switzerland, the UK and the United States. He represented Great Britain as a skier in the slalom and giant slalom at the 1956 Cortina d'Ampezzo Winter Olympics, being disqualified from the former and finishing 56th in the latter.

== Filmmaking career ==
Whitelaw's film career began when he worked as an assistant to the producer David O. Selznick on the 1957 film A Farewell to Arms. He also worked for the production company Hecht-Lancaster. He went on to work for United Artists in a number of capacities, including as head of production for UA Europe.

At this time he was based in London and worked on films including Bernardo Bertolucci’s Last Tango in Paris (1972), Federico Fellini’s Roma (1972) and Pier Paolo Pasolini’s The Decameron (1971). He directed two films: Lifespan (1974), which starred Klaus Kinski, and Vicious Circles (1997), which starred Ben Gazzara. He acted in a number of films including The American Friend (1977), Broken English (1981) and The Beat That My Heart Skipped (2005).

Whitelaw began to work as a subtitler in the 1970s in Paris. It was the producer Pierre Cottrell who suggested that he subtitle Jean Eustache's film Mes petites amoureuses. He continued to work as a subtitler for four decades.

== Films subtitled ==
Whitelaw provided English subtitles for more than 1,000 films over a period of several decades. He once called it "like getting paid to do crosswords". One of the more challenging jobs he took on was the subtitling, with Stephen O'Shea, of Mathieu Kassovitz's 1995 film La Haine. Their subtitles for this film received considerable critical attention.

Notable titles subtitled by Whitelaw include:

- Mes petites amoureuses (Eustache, 1974)
- Pauline at the Beach (Rohmer, 1983)
- Danton (Wajda, 1983)
- Shoah (Lanzmann, 1985)
- La Haine (Kassovitz, 1995)
- Heading South (Cantet, 2005)
- Quai d'Orsay (Tavernier, 2013)

== Filmography ==
Year	Title	Role	Notes
1975	Vincent mit l'âne dans un pré (et s'en vint dans l'autre)	Jérôme	
1977	The American Friend	Arzt in Paris	
1977	Les apprentis sorcier		
1978	Robert et Robert	Le guide anglais	
1978	La Tortue sur le dos	Prokosch	
1979	Lady Oscar	Un invité au bal noir	
1981	Beau-père	Le père de la jeune fille (anniversaire)	Uncredited
1981	Broken English	Arms Dealer	
1982	All Fired Up		
1982	Enigma		
1984	Notorious Nobodies		
2005	The Beat That My Heart Skipped	Mr. Fox	
2012	Au galop	Homme veillée	(final film role)
