= The Man with One Red Shoe =

1985 comedy film directed by Stan Dragoti

- Theatrical release poster
- Directed by: Stan Dragoti
- Screenplay by: Robert Klane
- Story by: Francis Veber; Yves Robert
- Produced by: Victor Drai
- Starring: Tom Hanks; Dabney Coleman; Lori Singer; Charles Durning; Jim Belushi; Carrie Fisher; Ed Herrmann
- Cinematography: Richard Pursel
- Edited by: O. Nicholas Brown; Bud Molin
- Music by: Thomas Newman
- Distributed by: 20th Century Fox
- Release date: July 19, 1985
- Running time: 92 minutes
- Country: United States
- Language: English
- Budget: $16 million
- Box office: $8.6 million

The Man with One Red Shoe is a 1985 American comedy film directed by Stan Dragoti and starring Tom Hanks and Dabney Coleman. It is a remake of the 1972 French film The Tall Blond Man with One Black Shoe starring Pierre Richard and Mireille Darc.

== Plot ==
An agent of the United States CIA is arrested in Morocco on drug-smuggling charges. The person behind the smuggling operation is CIA deputy director Burton Cooper, who hopes the scandal will lead to the resignation of CIA Director Ross and to Cooper's promotion to Director. Ross is aware of Cooper's complicity, but when questioned by a special Senate committee about the arrest, he tells the committee that he has not reviewed all of the facts of the case. The committee orders a full inquiry and gives Ross 48 hours to present with the proper answers.

Ross devises a plan for Cooper's downfall. Knowing his house has been bugged by Cooper, he leaks a rumor that a man will be arriving at the airport who will clear him of the scandal and orders his assistant Brown to pick him up. Cooper sends his own agents to follow Brown, who goes to the airport with instructions to pick someone at random from the crowd, leading Cooper and his team on a wild-goose chase.

Brown spots a man wearing mismatched shoes and picks him as their random target. The man is concert violinist Richard Drew, whose percussionist friend Morris played a trick on him by hiding one of each pair of his shoes, forcing Richard to wear one business shoe and one red sneaker. Cooper takes the bait and starts tracking him.

Richard is oblivious to the intelligence operations centered on him. He had a fling with Morris's flautist wife Paula, who plays in the same symphony orchestra as the two men. After eluding them at the airport, Richard is bumped into by Maddy, one of Cooper's operatives, who steals his wallet.

After damaging his tooth with a bag of gag peanuts given to him by Morris, Richard heads to the dentist. Cooper sends his agents out to continue their surveillance, first by having Maddy lead a team to search his apartment for information and bug it for sound, then by having other agents intercept him at his dentist's office, believing his tooth has microfilm inside.

They learn that Richard has traveled the world, including several communist countries. Cooper thinks this is the perfect cover for a spy and starts digging deeper. Soon, they suspect his sheet music is a code and use Department of Defense computers to decipher it. Hoping to learn more, he sends Maddy to seduce Richard and find out what he knows. While Richard is playing a violin composition he wrote for her, Maddy genuinely falls for him. Meanwhile, Morris catches glimpses of the operations of Cooper's agents, leading him to believe he may be going mad.

When one attempt after another fails to yield any usable information, Cooper orders Richard killed and eventually attempts to kill him himself. Maddy intervenes to save him and testifies in front of the Senate about the plot. Cooper is arrested, Ross is demoted, and Brown becomes Director of the CIA. Morris is committed to a mental institution, and Paula calls off her romantic pursuit of Richard, deciding that her husband needs her. Maddy agrees to testify against Cooper in exchange for her freedom, after which she reunites with Richard.

== Cast ==
- Tom Hanks as Richard Drew
- Dabney Coleman as Burton Cooper
- Lori Singer as Maddy
- Charles Durning as Ross
- Carrie Fisher as Paula
- Jim Belushi as Morris
- Edward Herrmann as Brown
- David Ogden Stiers as Orchestra Conductor
- Irving Metzman as Virdon
- Tom Noonan as Reese
- Gerrit Graham as Carson
- David L. Lander as Stemple
- Art LaFleur as CIA Agent
- Pete Cody as Boy on Airplane

== Release ==
The film was considered a box office disappointment. Released by 20th Century Fox in July 1985, it debuted at no. 7 at the box office its opening weekend and grossed just $8,645,411 over its short theatrical run.

== Reception ==
On the review aggregator Rotten Tomatoes, the film has a 47% approval rating based on 15 reviews, with an average rating of 4.7/10. On Metacritic, the film has a weighted average score of 31 out of 100, based on 9 critics, indicating "generally unfavorable reviews". Audiences polled by CinemaScore gave the film an average grade of "C+" on an A+ to F scale.

== See also ==
- List of American films of 1985
