= Louise Shivers =

American novelist

Louise Shivers (August 15, 1929 – July 26, 2014) was an American author and writer-in-residence at Georgia Regents University, Augusta, Georgia.

Born in 1929 in Stantonsburg and raised in Wilson, North Carolina, Shivers received a National Endowment for the Arts Fellowship and published two novels. Here to Get My Baby Out of Jail, originally published by Random House, Collins, London, and Editions Belfond in Paris, was named Best First Novel of the Year by USA Today in 1983 and was made into the feature film Summer Heat. The novel is available from John F. Blair Publishers and Google ebooks. A stage play, Faith's Affair, by Jayetta Slawson based on the novel made its debut in 2006 at Southeastern Louisiana University in Hammond, Louisiana. A Whistling Woman garnered Shivers the Georgia Author of the Year award in 1993.

In January 2013, My Shining Hour : A novelist's memoir of World War II was published.

Shivers died of congestive heart failure in Evans, Georgia on July 26, 2014, aged 84.
