= F.T.W. (film) =

1994 film by Michael Karbelnikoff

- Directed by: Michael Karbelnikoff
- Written by: Mickey Rourke; Mari Kornhauser
- Starring: Mickey Rourke; Lori Singer; Brion James
- Release date: 1994
- Running time: 100 minutes
- Country: United States
- Language: English

F.T.W. (a.k.a. The Last Ride) is a 1994 American film about Frank T. Wells, an ex-con rodeo rider who becomes involved with a woman who's a bank robber on the run. The title of the film refers both to the main character's initials, and to a tattoo on Scarlett's hand, meaning "Fuck The World".

== Plot ==
Frank T. Wells, an ex-rodeo champion, is released from prison after serving a 10-year sentence that resulted from a bar fight. He meets with old acquaintances, collects his broken old '48 Ford pickup, gets a camper to live in and returns to earning a living as a rodeo cowboy, riding his new horse Angel.

Scarlett Stuart is an amateur auto-repair mechanic who lives with her sexually-abusive brother Clem. The two of them are joined by Joe Palmieri in committing a bank robbery. During the robbery, eight policemen are killed. Trying to hide in a motel, the trio are found by the police, who kill Clem and Joe during a shootout, while Scarlett manages to escape.

On his way to his camper, Frank's truck breaks down and he unloads Angel from his trailer, and rides until he stumbles upon a barn where he happens to meet Scarlett. She agrees to help him fix the old Ford and in return, he offers the emotionally disturbed woman the opportunity to escape her problems with him.

Scarlett has a tattoo "F.T.W.", standing for "Fuck The World," and because these are the same initials of Frank's name, she believes that they are meant to be together, and they begin to have a relationship.

Living together, they try to make ends meet while laying low from the authorities, but it is more easily said than done, as Scarlett tries to support herself by means of armed robbery.

== Cast ==
- Mickey Rourke as Frank T. Wells
- Lori Singer as Scarlett Stuart
- Peter Berg as Clem Stuart
- John Enos III as Joe Palmieri
- Brion James as Sheriff Morgan

== Production ==
In July 1993, the crew started preparations, with Big Truck productions scouting several locations in southwest Montana. Principal photography begin on August 9, 1993 in Bozeman, Montana. Rodeo scenes took place in Wilsall. The bank robbery was filmed at the old Metals Bank in Butte, where they also filmed a car chase sequence. The scenes showing Rourke's character in prison were filmed at the Old Montana Territorial Prison in Deer Lodge. Filming continued, over several weeks, in Livingston, Three Forks and Wilsall, before wrapping on September 25, 1993.

Rourke co-wrote the script with Mari Kornhauser and has stated that he saw the story as a "dark love story between two outcasts, two lost souls".

== Reception ==
Variety reviewed the film, writing that it was "a mostly ho-hum cross between a modern cowboy yarn and a lovers-on-the-run crime saga." Time Out praised Rourke's performance, stating "He gives a strong performance in a very capable little movie: a melancholy love story with bloody bookends."
