= Camarillo Ranch House =

Historic house in California, United States

- U.S. National Register of Historic Places
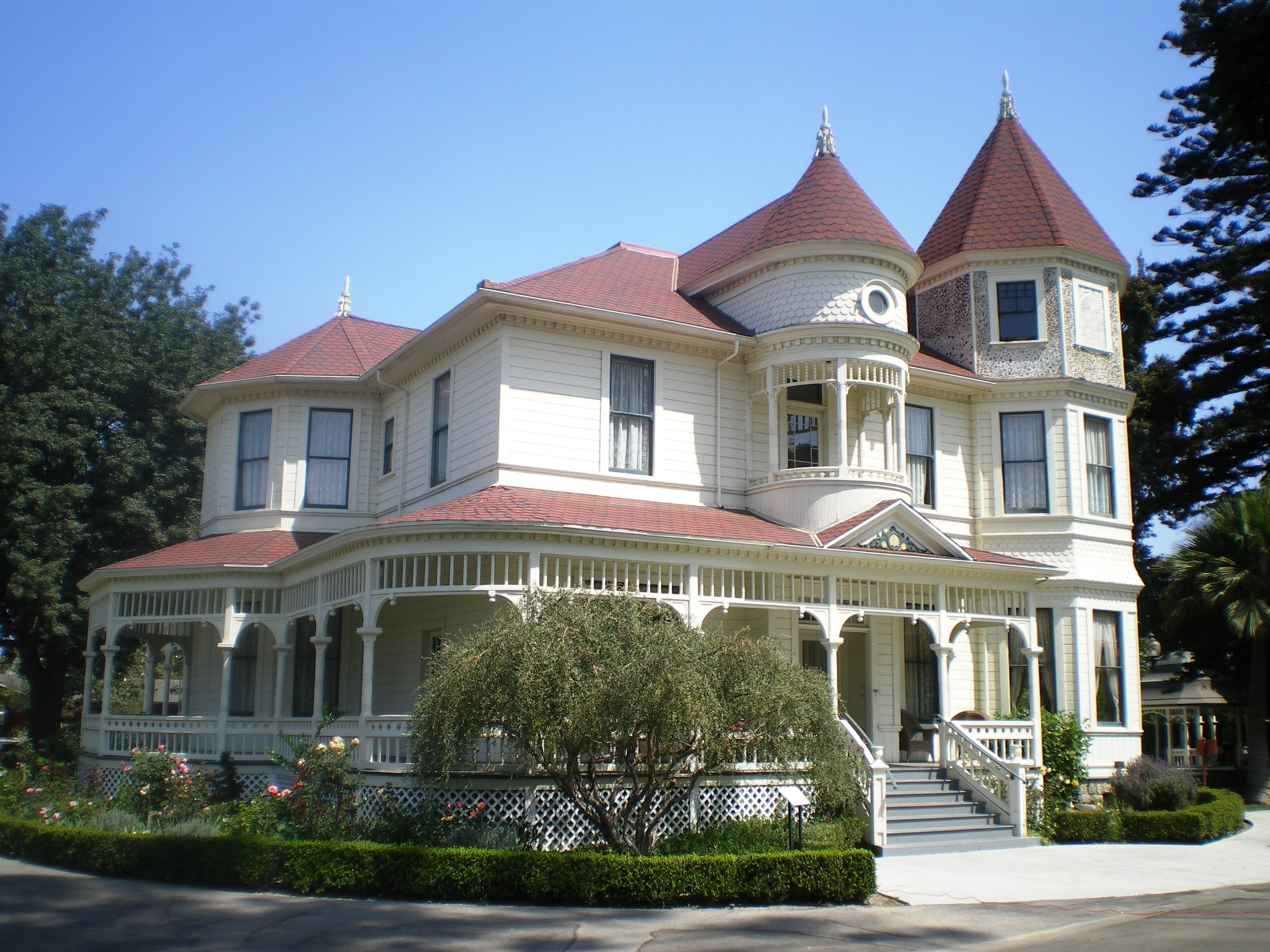
- Camarillo Ranch House

- Location within California Location within the United States
- Location: 201 Camarillo Ranch Rd., Camarillo, California
- Coordinates: 34°13′5″N 119°1′2″W
- Built: 1892
- Architect: Herman Anlauf, Franklin Ward (original); Lopez Architects, Craig J. Lopez (restoration)
- Architectural style: Queen Anne
- Restored: 1998
- NRHP reference No.: 03000039
- Added to NRHP: February 20, 2003

Camarillo Ranch House, also known as Rancho Calleguas and Adolfo Camarillo House, is a Queen Anne-style Victorian house in Camarillo, California. Built in 1892, the 6,000-square-foot (560 m^{2}) house was designed by architects Herman Anlauf and Franklin Ward. Adolfo Camarillo operated the ranch for 78 years, changing the operations from mostly cattle to crops. He was a leading innovator, growing lima beans, barley, corn, alfalfa, walnuts, and citrus and eucalyptus trees. The house was added to the National Register of Historic Places in 2003.

== History ==
Juan was a member of the Hijar-Padres Expedition to California in 1834 and he settled in Ventura in 1857. Juan and Martina Camarillo were married in 1840 and moved to Ventura, California in 1854, becoming the fourth European family in the town. In 1876, Juan Camarillo (1812–1880) bought the 10,000-acre (40 km^{2}) Rancho Calleguas in eastern Ventura County from Jose Pedro Ruiz for $3,000 in gold.

=== Legal battles for control of the Rancho ===
Juan Camarillo died in 1880, and Martina Camarillo in 1898. In 1891, Martina had deeded the Rancho to her sons, Adolfo and Juan, Jr. Following her death, the Camarillo daughters (who were bequeathed $5 each in the will) challenged the deeds and the will. The Los Angeles Times reported that it promised to be "the greatest legal battle yet fought" in the courts of Ventura County, as the family members fought over property then valued at "a million dollars or more." While the initial suit was settled within a few months, the sisters filed a new legal action in 1905, alleging that the brothers had deceived their mother and that Juan had confessed his fraud to his sister and paid her $8500. It was also alleged that Adolfo had forced Juan to leave the country upon threats of exposure of his "private acts" that would cause disgrace and scandal. The Los Angeles Times followed the "spicy" case closely, noting that its charges and counter-charges "would furnish material for a sure-enough 'season's best seller.'" At the trial, a letter was introduced purporting to be signed by Martina Camarillo instructing Adolfo to destroy the will leaving everything to himself and his brother. Juan testified that his sister sought to blackmail him by threatening to send him to prison for "an infamous crime," and a grandson testified that he saw Adolfo "mysteriously place a paper in Mrs. Camarillo's tin box within a few minutes after her death."

=== Adolfo Z. Camarillo ===
Following Juan's death in 1880, his oldest son, Adolfo Camarillo (1864–1958) took over the ranch operations at the age of sixteen and turned it into "the largest bean ranch in the world." Camarillo employed 700 workers on his ranch, and his production was so great that the Los Angeles Times reported in 1909 that, "through the enormous output of his ranch, [Camarillo] is, in a measure, able to set the price which the public must pay for beans." The Ranch House was built in 1892 under instruction of Adolfo Camarillo using architects Franklin Ward and Herman Anlauf. Adolfo would have preferred to have built a home in Spanish style due to his background, but the homes surrounding the area were owned by Eastern Europeans. Despite his 4’11 stature, he was highly respected within his community, and could be seen frequently riding his pure bred white stallions. Adolfo's wife Isabella, who strived to fit into this new environment, would entertain guests with tea, jam, and tortillas. She enjoyed the English culture, and worked to infuse her own culture into it as well. Adolfo Camarillo himself had to have fresh tortillas every morning for breakfast. The Camarillo family had multiple servants who worked and lived on the ranch with them. A large hallway, also known as a breezeway, separates the living quarters between the servants and the rest of the family.

Adolfo Camarillo became one of the wealthiest landowners in the county, and in 1911 he was elected chairman of the Ventura County Board of Supervisors. He also served as a member of the State Board of Agriculture. For 78 years, Adolfo operated the Camarillo Ranch, changing the operations from mostly cattle to crops. He was a leading innovator growing lima beans, barley, corn, alfalfa, walnuts, citrus and eucalyptus trees. Adolfo, sometimes referred to as “The Last Spanish Don,” was a leader within the community and a heavy donator that helped shape the City of Camarillo.

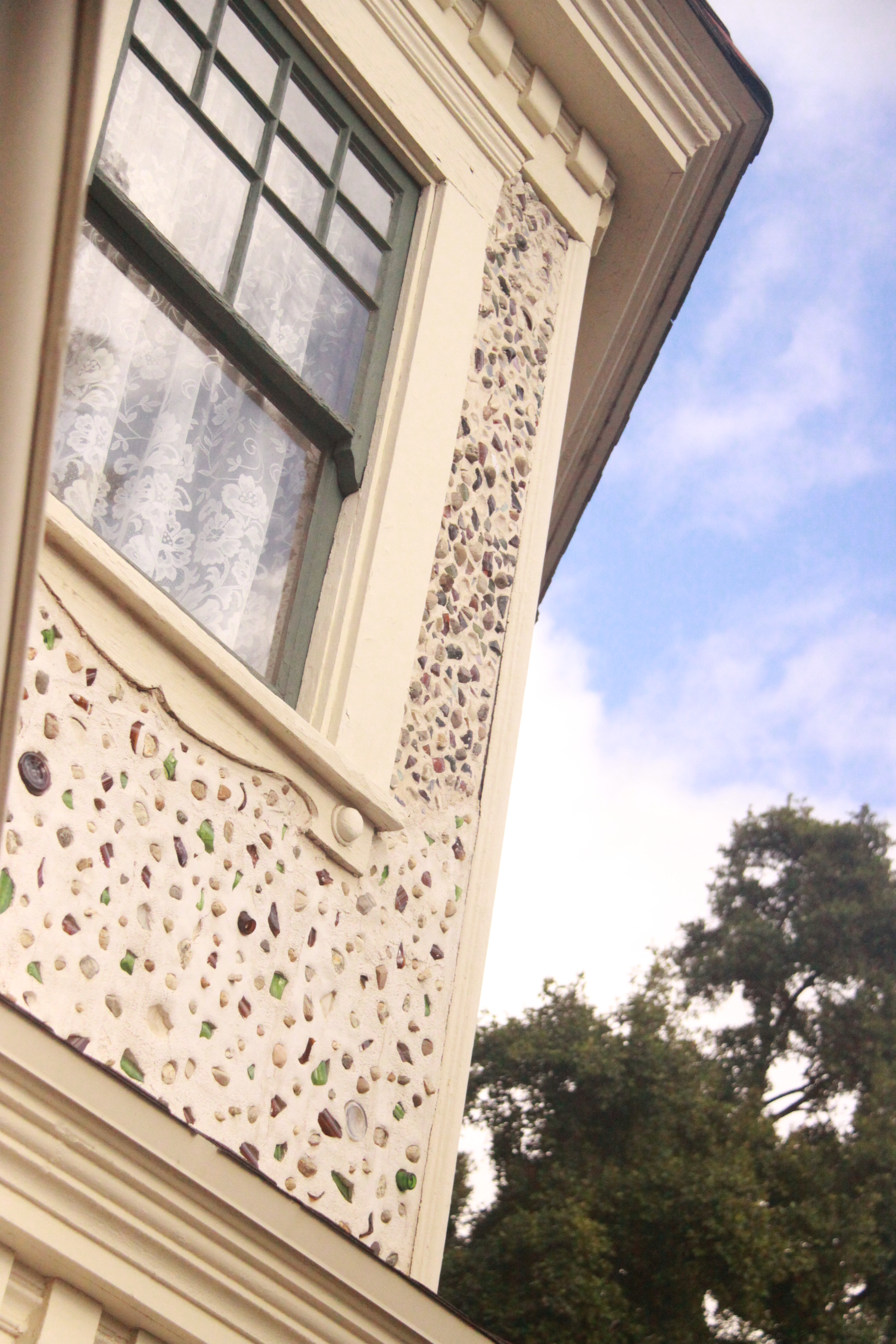
Close-up of broken glass used to adorn the exterior of the house

=== Sale and subdivision of the Rancho ===
In 1963, the family put the vast ranch property up for sale. An initial sale of 5,500 acres (22 km^{2}) in 1963 fell through, but the ranch was eventually sold off and developed into the housing tracts and commercial and industrial centers. The Camarillo family retained about 100 acres (0.40 km^{2}), including the old ranch house.

== Architecture and use as the center of ranch operations ==
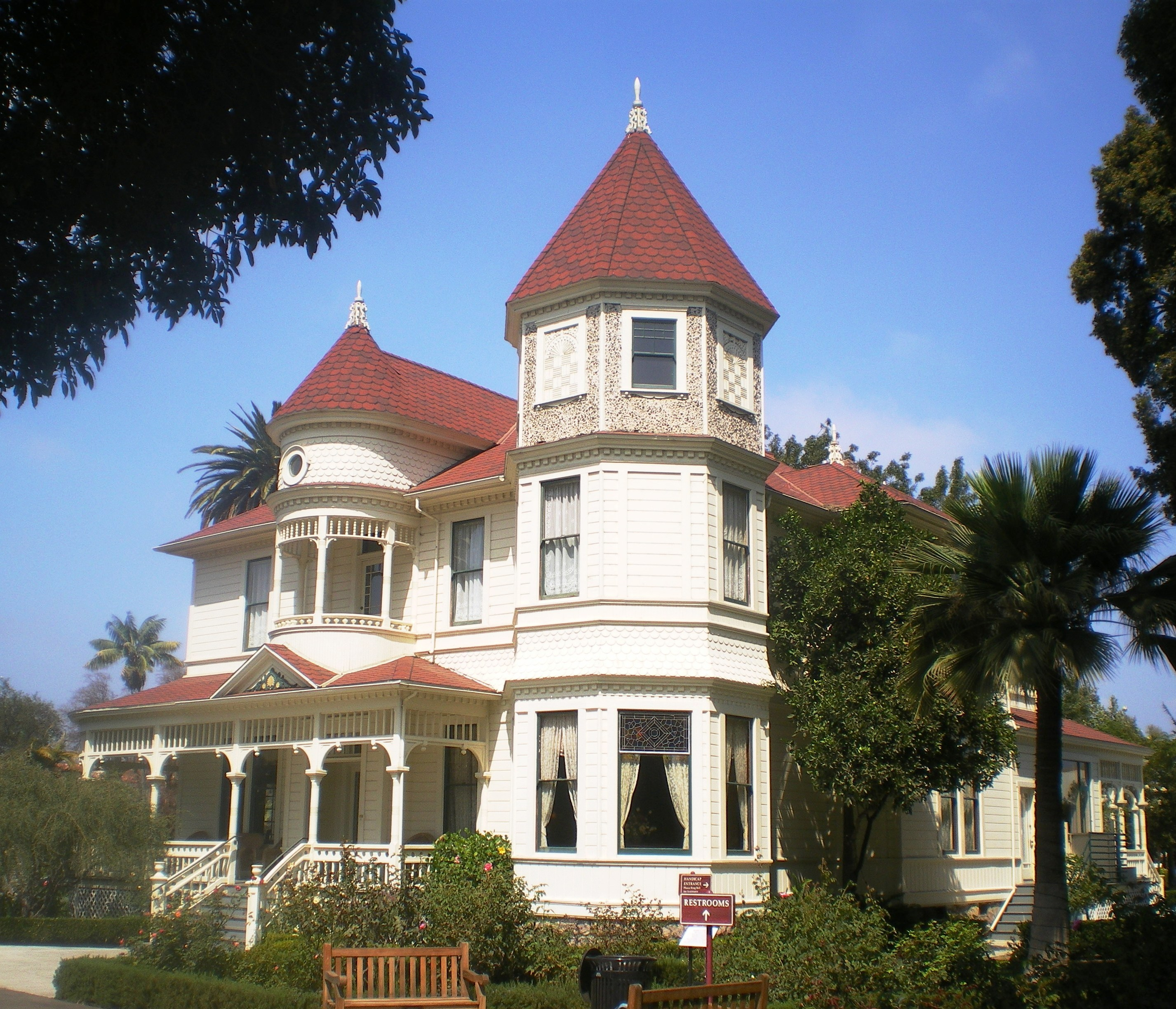
Camarillo Ranch House in 2008

After receiving title to the Rancho from his mother in 1891, Adolfo Camarillo hired architects Herman Anlauf and Franklin Ward in 1892 to build a 6,000-square-foot (560 m^{2}) Queen-Anne style Victorian house. They also designed the House at Faulkner Farm near Santa Paula. The house has two turrets, a large veranda and sprawling lawns. Adolfo also planted many varieties of trees, including eucalyptus trees, around the house. The Camarillo Ranch House, as it is now known, became the center of the sprawling Rancho Calleguas for the next 70 years. From the ranch house, Adolfo oversaw the Rancho's production of lima beans, walnuts, and citrus. The house also became known for the barbecues, rodeos and fiestas held by Adolfo. Adolfo lived in the three-story Victorian mansion until shortly before his death from pneumonia in December 1958.

Despite the Camarillo Ranch House's ideal location in Southern California, back in the early 1900s the home struggled to stay warm. Almost every room in the house has a fireplace in it. Adolfo looked to technology as a way to remedy problems that would arise on the ranch. He was the first farmer to ever purchase a refrigerator, which at that time, would take up an entire room in the house. However, he was able to safely store perishables for the first time in his life. He also had multiple heaters installed throughout the house in hopes of providing more warmth to his family. The most beautiful room in the Camarillo Ranch house belonged to Adolfo's middle daughter Carmen. Carmen was an avid equestrian who learned how to care for and maintain the horses from the Ranch Manager, Meliton Ortiz. Up until Meliton Ortiz’ death in 2010, he would visit the Camarillo Ranch House frequently to provide stories and details about his life growing up on the ranch. The home was remodeled in 1914, when the oldest daughter Carmen married. They opened many rooms by taking down walls and changing the stair design. The grand parlor had the greatest changes from this, causing it to go from multiple to rooms to one giant open grand parlor. This was in the hopes that it would open up the house more.

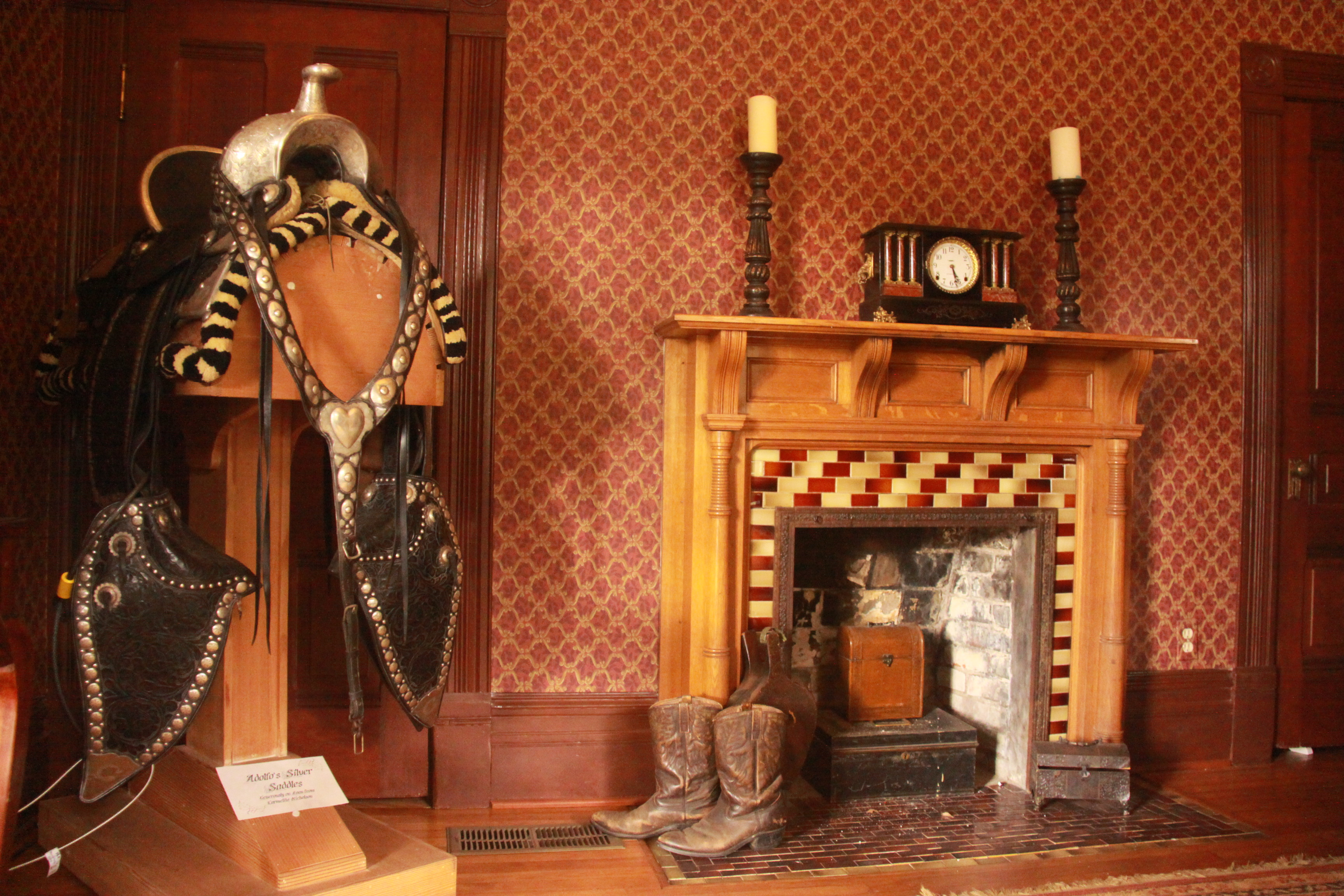
One of the home's many fireplaces.

In 1998, The Firm of Lopez Architects, A.I.A, of Camarillo, CA, provided a Historic Preservation Rehabilation to the House. Under the direction of Principal, Craig J. Lopez, A.I.A. the home was seismically upgraded, and replicated to its original room, exterior porch configuration and High Victorian exterior style. Between 1999 and 2000 the City of Camarillo and the Camarillo Ranch Foundation worked together to complete a $1.5 million restoration of the house, barn and stables. With its completion in 2001, the three-story, fourteen-room Queen Anne Victorian home is a fully furnished museum that provides tours and holds events.

== White Arabian stallions ==
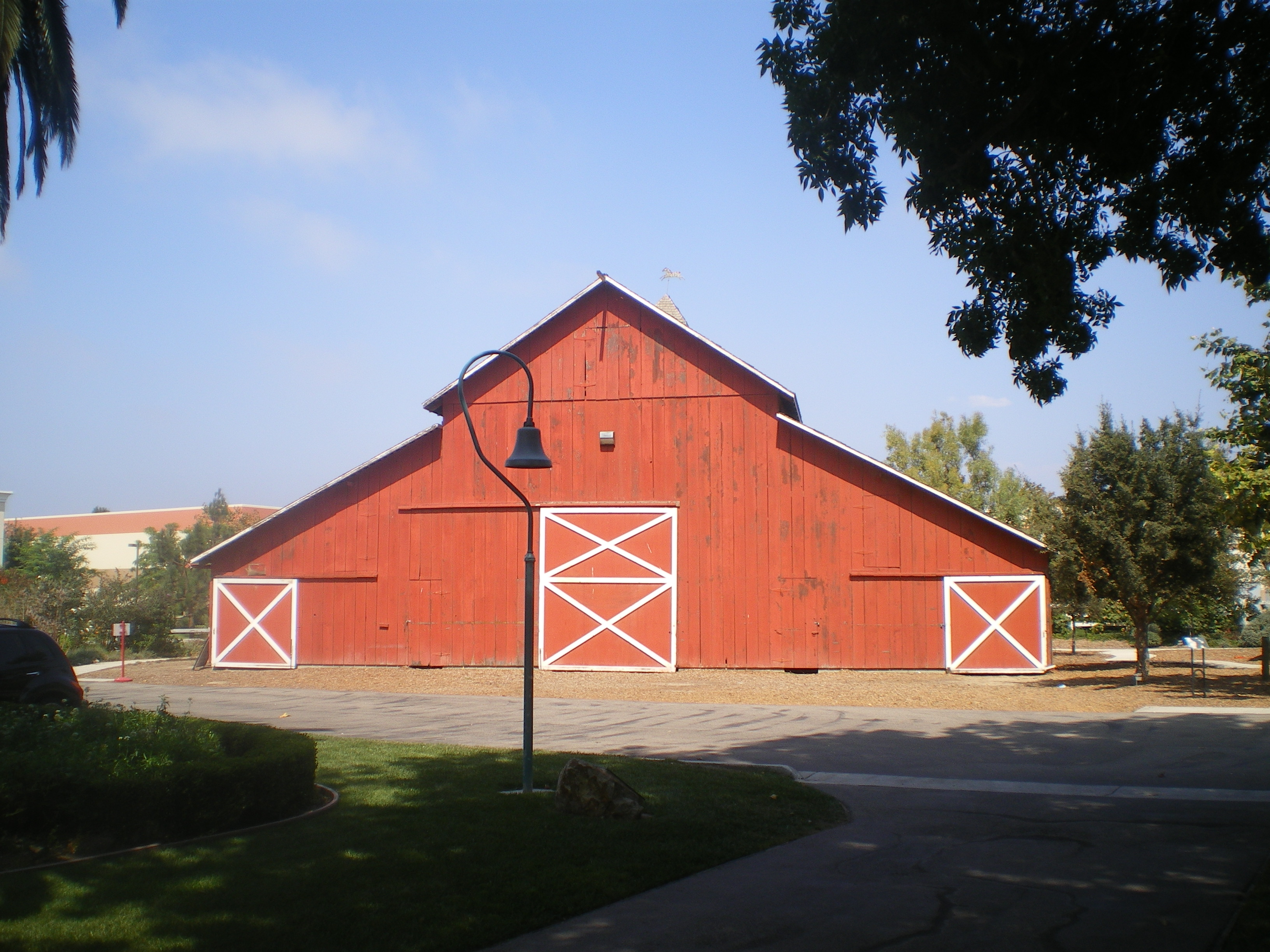
Barn where the Camarillo white stallions were kept

The Camarillo Ranch is known for the white Arabian parade stallions bred by Adolfo that he rode in the annual Fiesta of Santa Barbara dressed in colorful Spanish attire. Adolfo's original sire, Sultan, was a pure white, part Arabian and Morgan stallion. Sultan reportedly produced "snow white, pink skinned foals" no matter the color of the mares with whom he was mated. Since the 1920s, the Camarillo horses have appeared in numerous parades and at the opening of the San Francisco-Oakland Bay Bridge in 1941. In 1950, the Camarillo horses led the Rose Parade and have been in many Rose Parades since. Even after Adolfo died in 1958, the family continued to carry on the tradition of breeding the white Arabians and riding them in area parades. In 1967, the Camarillos were still breeding the white horses on the remaining 117 acres (0.47 km^{2}) owned by the family, and the Los Angeles Times published a feature story on the Camarillo horses. At that time, there were about a dozen Camarillo white Arabians remaining, and the Times wrote: "The Camarillo horses love a parade. Any spectator who has ever watched one dance down the street -- a brightly costumed member of the Camarillo family astride a heavily ornamented silver saddle -- can attest to the predilection."

== Public ownership and operation ==
In 1998, the Camarillo Planning Commission approved a zoning change to allow an industrial park to be built around the Camarillo Ranch House, but conditioned the approval on the developer's donating the ranch house, barn and 4.4 acres (18,000 m^{2}) to the city. The city then renovated the house and opened it to the public in 2001 as a museum and site for receptions and other functions. The house is operated by the nonprofit Camarillo Ranch Foundation. The renovation cost $1.5 million and was also made possible by volunteers who donated 10,000 hours to the effort.

Camarillo Ranch House is a popular location not only for weddings and receptions but also for filming. One location manager noted that the house has the appearance of a rural setting "almost anywhere in the United States -- from Bakersfield to Nebraska."

=== Use and events ===
The house is operated by the Rancho Camarillo Foundation and is open to the public for docent-led tours on Saturdays and Sundays. It is also available to be rented for weddings and other special events. The Camarillo Ranch Foundation sponsors annual community events intended to educate the public about Camarillo's history, and hosts over 150 private and public events annually. The Camarillo Ranch House is a wedding venue with four different venues including the Front Lawn, the Red Barn, the East Garden, and the West Garden. Around the property are several thematic gardens including a butterfly garden and a formal Victorian garden. The Camarillo Ranch House also hosts corporate and nonprofit events.

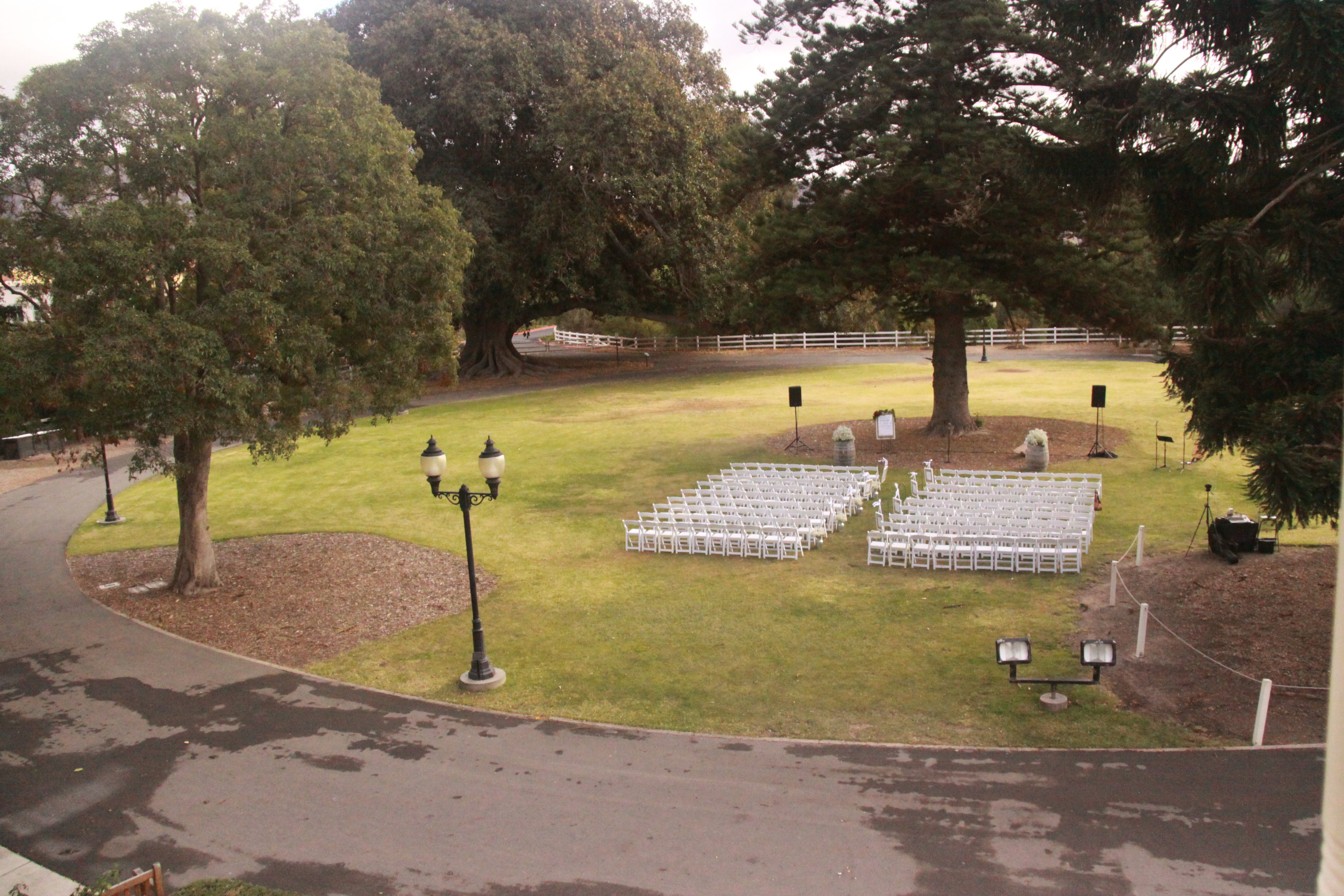
The lawn at the ranch used for a wedding

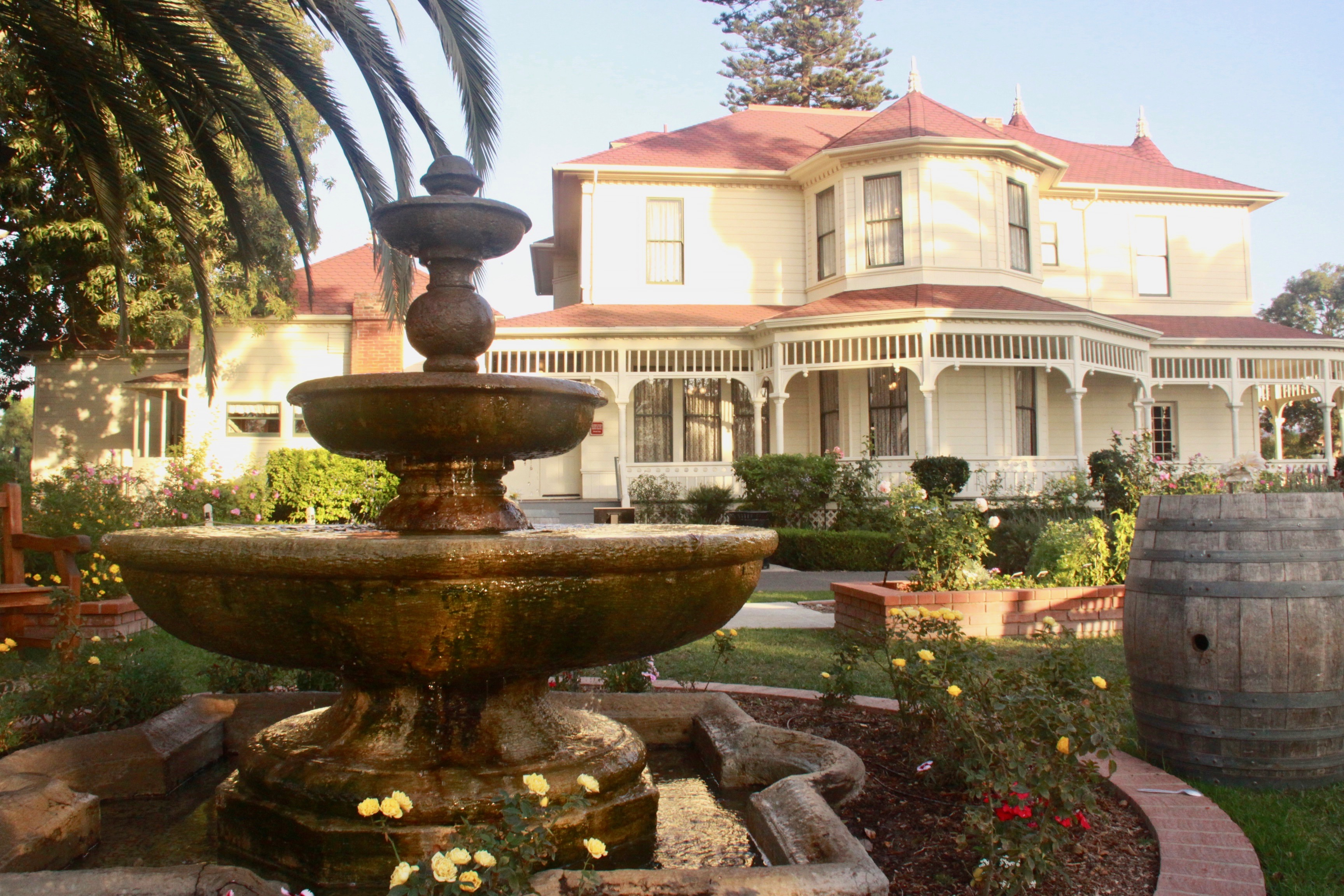
Adolfo Camarillo commissioned this fountain circa 1920 for his mansion garden.

=== The Camarillo Ranch Foundation ===
The Camarillo Ranch Foundation was established in 1998 by the City of Camarillo as a non-profit public benefit organization. The Camarillo Ranch Foundation is operated by a 15-member board of directors. The Camarillo Ranch Foundation's mission statement is: “To preserve, restore, operate, and maintain the Camarillo Ranch as a historic site in partnership with our public and private sectors, on a self-sustaining basis; to foster its place in the rich history of California; to transform it into a focal point of the community for education, enrichment, and enjoyment; and to exhibit our diverse history and culture.” The Camarillo Ranch House offers programs aimed to benefit the community such as “Bring a Child to the Ranch” and scholarships to students directly related to the Camarillo family.

== See also ==
- List of Registered Historic Places in Ventura County, California
- Ventura County Historic Landmarks & Points of Interest
