= The Island of the Mapmaker's Wife =

2001 film by Michie Gleason

- Directed by: Michie Gleason
- Written by: Michie Gleason
- Produced by: Berry van Zwieten
- Starring: Liam Cunningham; Roland Gift; Natasha Little; Dominique Sanda
- Cinematography: Theo Bierkens
- Music by: Debbie Wiseman
- Release date: 2001
- Countries: United Kingdom; Netherlands
- Language: English

The Island of the Mapmaker's Wife is a 2001 British-Dutch film directed by Michie Gleason, with a screenplay by Michie Gleason based on a short story by Marilyn Sides which appeared in the 1990 O. Henry Prize Stories collection.

== Plot ==
Descotes, a young map expert, discovers the marvelous erotic secret of an elaborate ancient map that she lusts to own.
