= We're Alive (film) =

1974 film documentary film by UCLA students

- Directed by: Michie Gleason, Christine Lesiak, Kathy Levitt
- Production company: Women's Film Workshop
- Release date: 1974
- Country: United States
- Language: English

We're Alive is a 1974 American documentary film by UCLA students Michie Gleason, Christine Lesiak and Kathy Levitt.

== Summary ==
A bold look at a group of incarcerated women at the California Institution for Women.

== Production ==
Made by the Women's Film Workshop alongside the prisoners, most of the documentary was shot on video before it was converted into film.

== Legacy ==
In 2023, We're Alive was selected for preservation in the National Film Registry by the Library of Congress for its cultural and historical importance.
