= Michie Gleason =

American film director and screenwriter

Michie Gleason is a film director and screenplay writer based in Los Angeles. She has written and directed The Island of the Mapmaker's Wife (2001), Summer Heat (1987) and Broken English (1981). She was assistant to the director on the film Days of Heaven (1978).

While a student at University of California, Los Angeles in 1974, Gleason and fellow students Christine Lesiak and Kathy Levitt wrote, filmed and produced We’re Alive, a documentary covering the economic pressures and injustices faced by women incarcerated at the California Institution for Women in Chino, California. The film was restored by archivists in 2022 and later selected for preservation at the Library of Congress’s National Film Registry.
