= George Washington Faulkner House =

Historic house in California, United States

- U.S. National Register of Historic Places
- U.S. Historic district
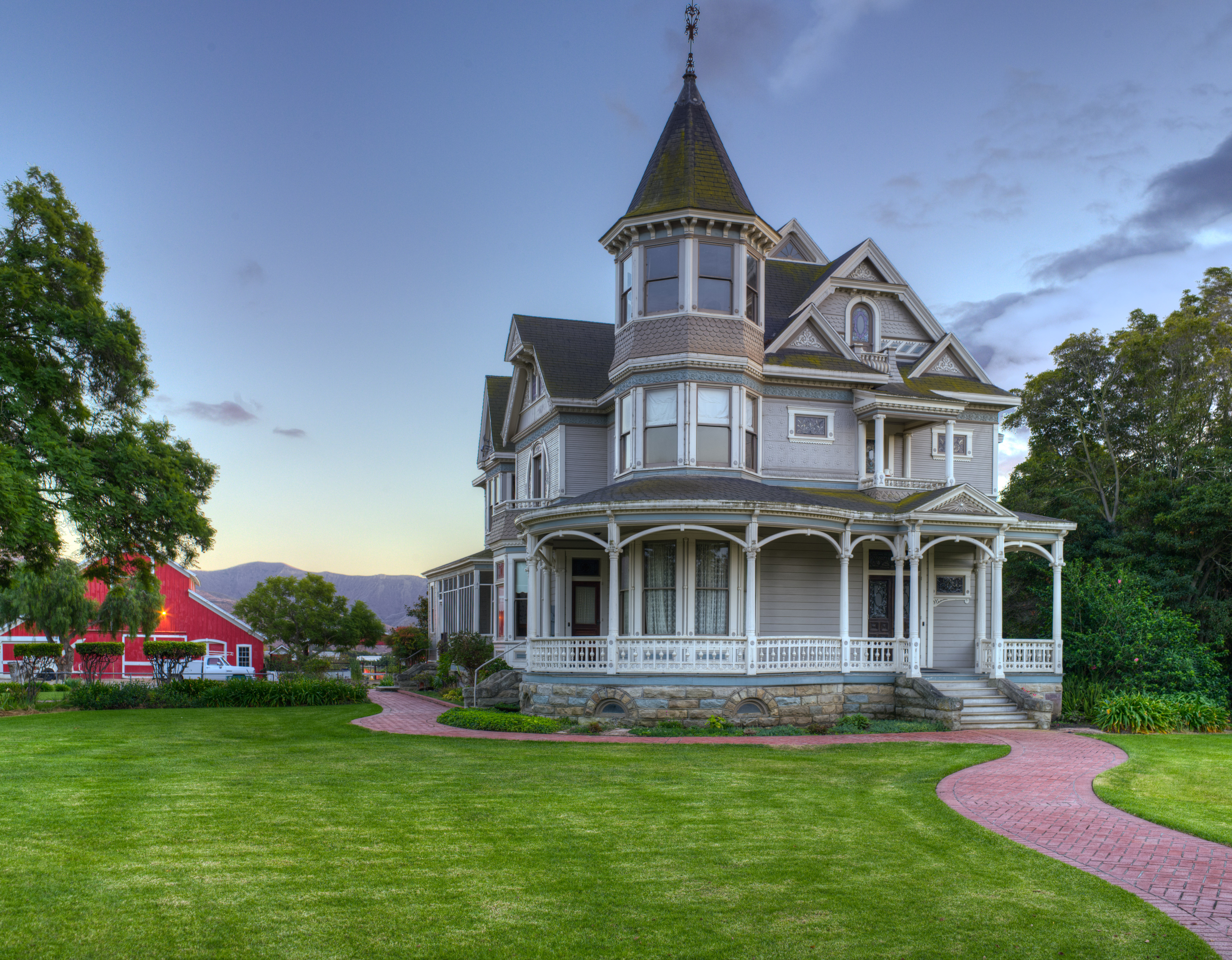

- Location within California Location within the United States
- Location: 14292 W. Telegraph Rd., Santa Paula, California
- Coordinates: 34.32672°N 119.10711°W
- Area: 27.2 acres (11.0 ha)
- Built: 1894
- Architect: Anlauf, Herman; Ward, Franklin P.
- Architectural style: Queen Anne
- NRHP reference No.: 91000485
- Added to NRHP: April 25, 1991

The George Washington Faulkner House, known also as Faulkner House and as Faulkner Farm, in Santa Paula, California, was built in 1894. The Queen Anne style house was a work of architect/builders Herman Anlauf and Franklin P. Ward.

In 1968, the house was the first designated landmark by the county of Ventura. It was listed on the National Register of Historic Places in 1991. The listing included two additional contributing buildings, an 1886 barn and an outhouse, as well as non-contributing buildings, on 27.2 acres (11.0 ha).

It was deemed significant "as the most outstanding example of Queen Anne architecture in the Santa Clara Valley between Santa Paula and Ventura", and also "for its association with pioneer farmer George Washington Faulkner and the contributions he made to the successful development of agriculture in Ventura County."

== UC Hansen Agricultural Research and Extension Center ==
The property was acquired in 1997 by the University of California to serve as the UC Hansen Agricultural Research and Extension Center. It was one of nine research and extension centers operated by the UC Agriculture and Natural Resources. With a strong agriculture economy in the Santa Clara River Valley, university researchers used the fertile soil to study various crops.

== See also ==
- Camarillo Ranch House - Also Architect/builders Herman Anlauf and Franklin P. Ward.
- National Register of Historic Places listings in Ventura County, California
- Ventura County Historic Landmarks & Points of Interest
