= Mea Maxima Culpa: Silence in the House of God =

2012 documentary film by Alex Gibney

- Directed by: Alex Gibney
- Written by: Alex Gibney
- Produced by: Alex Gibney; Alexandra Johnes; Kristen Vaurio; Jedd Wider; Todd Wider
- Narrated by: Alex Gibney
- Cinematography: Lisa Rinzler
- Edited by: Sloane Klevin
- Music by: Ivor Guest; Robert Logan
- Production companies: Jigsaw Productions; Wider Film Projects; Below The Radar Entertainment
- Distributed by: HBO Documentary Films
- Release dates: September 9, 2012 (TIFF); November 16, 2012 (United States)
- Running time: 107 minutes
- Country: United States
- Language: English

Mea Maxima Culpa: Silence in the House of God is a 2012 documentary film directed by Alex Gibney. The film details the first known protest against clerical sex abuse in the United States by four deaf men. It features the voices of actors Jamey Sheridan, Chris Cooper, Ethan Hawke and John Slattery, who provide the voices of the deaf interviewees.

The film's title is derived from the Latin phrase "mea maxima culpa", meaning "through my most grievous fault". It is taken from the Confiteor that is part of the Roman Catholic Mass.

== Synopsis ==
The film follows documentary filmmaker Alex Gibney as he examines the abuse of power in the Catholic Church system through the story of four deaf men—Terry Kohut, Gary Smith, Pat Kuehn and Arthur Budzinski—who set out to expose the priest who abused them during the mid-1960s at St. John's School for the Deaf. Each of the men brought forth the first known case of public protest against clerical sex abuse, which later led to the sex scandal case known as the Lawrence Murphy case. Through their case the film follows a cover-up that winds its way from the row houses of Milwaukee, Wisconsin, through Ireland's churches, all the way to the highest office of the Vatican.

== Release ==
The film premiered on September 9, 2012, at the 2012 Toronto International Film Festival. It later opened in limited release on November 16, 2012, and premiered worldwide on HBO on February 4, 2013. The film was the first of many collaborations between Gibney and the network.

== Reaction ==
=== Critical response ===
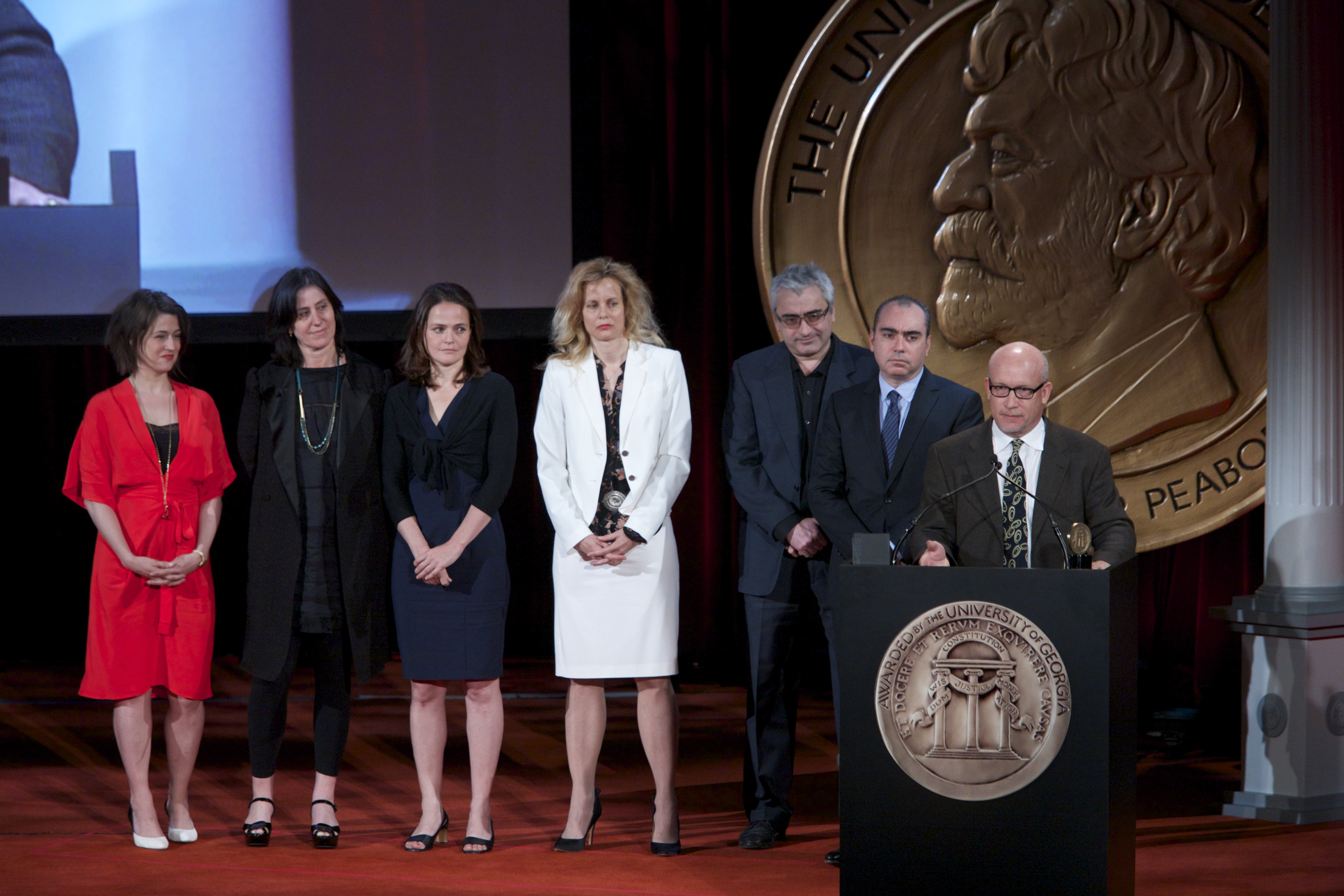
Kristen Vaurio, Sloane Klevin, Alexandra Johnes, Lori Singer, Todd Wider, Jedd Wider and Alex Gibney accept the Peabody Award for Mea Maxima Culpa

The film received positive feedback from critics. Review aggregation website Rotten Tomatoes gives the film a score of 98% based on reviews from 42 critics, with a rating average of 7.8 out of 10. Metacritic, which assigns a weighted average score out of 100 to reviews from mainstream critics, reports the film with a score of 73 based on 16 reviews.

Mark Jenkins of NPR called the film "Alex Gibney's most powerful film since the Oscar-winning 2007 Taxi to the Dark Side." A. O. Scott of The New York Times particularly praised the way that the interviews of the victims were shot writing, "Mr. Gibney films them, against dark backgrounds with soft, indirect light, emphasizes the expressivity of their faces and hands, and will remind hearing viewers of the richness and eloquence of American Sign Language." Roger Ebert of the Chicago Sun-Times felt the film on a personal level, writing, "To someone who was raised and educated in the Catholic school system, as I was, a film like this inspires shock and outrage." He went on to write that the film "is calm and steady, founded largely on the testimony of Murphy's victims."

=== Awards ===
In 2013, Mea Maxima Culpa was nominated for six Primetime Emmy Awards, and won in three categories, including Exceptional Merit In Documentary Filmmaking. It won a Peabody Award in 2013 "for providing a harrowing story of clerical sexual abuse, empowering long-silenced victims and unveiling clandestine Church practices around accusations." Additionally, Gibney received his fourth nomination for Best Documentary Screenplay from the Writers Guild of America for this film.

== See also ==
- Catholic sex abuse cases
- Deliver Us from Evil (2006), a documentary about a sex abuse case in Northern California
- Holy Water-Gate (2004 documentary)
- Twist of Faith (2005), another HBO documentary film about abuse in the Catholic Church.
