= Richard David Emery =

American lawyer (born 1946)

Richard Emery
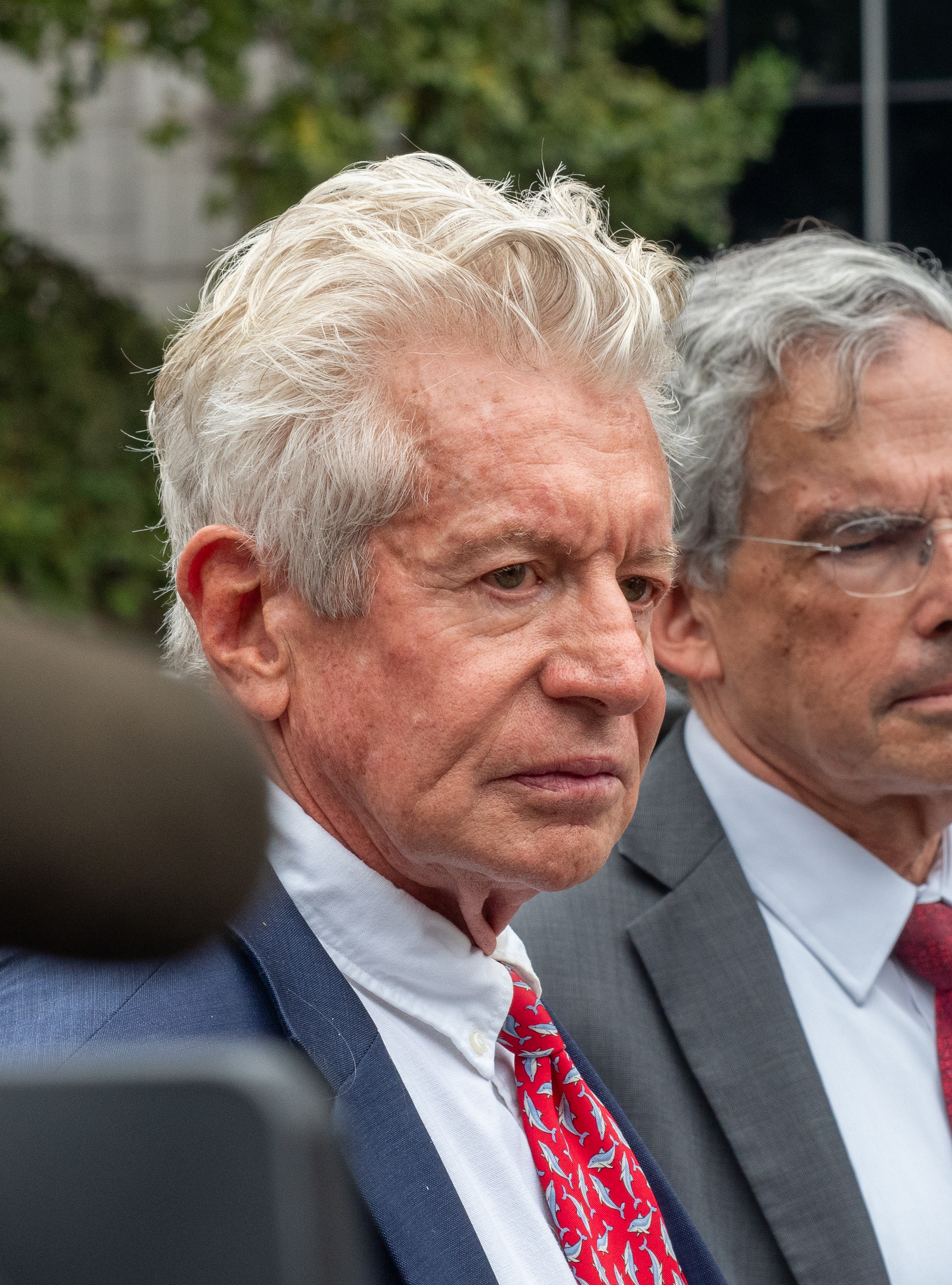
- Emery at a press conference in 2024, representing the City Club in their suit against the Hochul administration over congestion pricing in New York City
- Born: March 5, 1946 (age 80); Boston, Massachusetts, U.S.
- Education: Brown University (BA); Columbia Law School (JD)
- Spouses: Lori Singer (m. 1980; div. 1996) Melania Levitsky (m. 2002)
- Children: 2
- Family: Richard Courant (grandfather); Jürgen Moser (stepfather)

Richard David Emery (born March 5, 1946) is an American lawyer. He is a founding partner of Emery, Celli, Brinckerhoff Abady Ward & Maazel LLP. He was the Chair of the New York City Civilian Complaint Review Board from 2014 to 2016.

Emery was part of New York Governor Mario Cuomo's State Commission on Government Integrity in the late 1980s. He was also part of the part of New York Governor Eliot Spitzer's Transition Committee for Government Reform Issues. He was a member of the New York State Commission on Judicial Conduct for 13 years until March 2017.

== Early life and education ==
Emery was born in Boston, Massachusetts on March 5, 1946. He received a B.A. from Brown University in 1967 and received a J.D., cum laude, in 1970 from Columbia University Law School, where he was named a Harlan Fiske Stone Scholar. Following law school, he became a law clerk for Gus J. Solomon of the U.S. District Court for the District of Oregon.

== Career ==
After graduating from law school, Emery moved to Washington and founded the Institutional Legal Services Project, a state-financed public-interest firm that represented people who were incarcerated in prisons, mental institutions and juvenile facilities. After directing the project for six years, he moved back to New York in 1977 and joined the New York Civil Liberties Union as a staff attorney and worked there for a decade.

In 1978, he represented a woman associated with Judson Memorial Church who had been arrested while counseling sex workers; she subsequently received an $85,000 award. That year, he also represented a woman who had been arrested on suspicion of prostitution and obtained a $10,000 award on her behalf. In another 1978 case, he represented a high school student subjected to an invasive search by school personnel. A federal judge overturned a jury verdict upholding the search, ruling that requiring the 15-year-old student to remove her jeans was unreasonably intrusive; the student received $7,500 in damages, and the decision was later upheld on appeal.

In March 1978, Emery filed a federal lawsuit challenging the conditions in which immigrants detained for deportation were held at a United States Immigration and Naturalization Service facility in Brooklyn, including the use of solitary confinement. In 1979, he represented four students who had been suspended for publishing a satirical magazine outside school grounds. The United States Court of Appeals for the Second Circuit upheld the students' First Amendment right to publish, with Judge Irving R. Kaufman emphasizing that school authority did not extend without limit beyond the schoolhouse.

During the early 1980s, Emery continued to litigate civil-rights cases through the NYCLU. In 1981, the organization monitored New York City's redistricting process following the rejection of a City Council reapportionment plan by the United States Department of Justice. In 1982, the NYCLU filed a federal lawsuit on behalf of approximately 400 prisoners at the Westchester County Jail following a three-day disturbance over overcrowded and unsanitary conditions. The litigation challenged the treatment of prisoners during the response to the disturbance, and in 1983 a federal judge ruled that the prisoners could pursue their claims as a class. The case was settled in 1984 for $250,000.

In June 1982, Emery and the NYCLU challenged the composition of New York City's Board of Estimate, arguing that its equal representation of the five boroughs violated the constitutional principle of one person, one vote. Although a federal court initially ruled for the city, the United States Court of Appeals for the Second Circuit reversed the decision in 1983. The litigation ultimately contributed to the United States Supreme Court's 1989 decision in Board of Estimate of City of New York v. Morris, which held the Board of Estimate unconstitutional.

Emery also became a prominent commentator on policing and civil liberties. He published opinion articles in The New York Times on police practices and criminal-justice policy, including "Curbing New York's Police" in 1985, "Giuliani's Unfair Tactics" later that year, and "The Even Sadder New York Police Saga" in 1987. In 1985, he publicly challenged police sweeps conducted following a shooting in Bryant Park, arguing that arrests without individualized suspicion violated constitutional protections.

In 1987, Emery was offered a seat on Governor Mario Cuomo's State Commission on Government Integrity. He accepted the offer and resigned from New York Civil Liberties Union. The same year he became of counsel to Lankenau, Kovner & Bickford, and, thereafter, a partner, focusing on civil and civil rights cases at the firm. There, he represented Robert McLaughlin, who had been wrongfully convicted. Emery obtained McLaughlin's release and one of the first large awards of compensation for wrongful conviction.

One of Emery's most notable cases at the firm was a lawsuit charging that the New York City Board of Estimate violated the principle of "one person, one vote" by granting the Staten Island Borough President, who represented fewer than 400,000 people, the same power as the Brooklyn Borough President, who represented more than two million. In 1989, Emery won the case, arguing in the U.S. Supreme Court and achieving the invalidation of the Board on one person-one vote constitutional grounds.

In 1996, Emery represented Laurance Rockefeller, Jr. and presidential candidate Steve Forbes in their bids to gain ballot access. Emery left Lankenau, Kovner & Bickford and founded Emery, Celli, Brinckerhoff & Abady in 1997.

In 2000, Emery obtained a $1 million settlement from the New York City Police Department on behalf of former Deputy Commissioner Sandra Marsh, who alleged that she had been forced from her position by Police Commissioner Howard Safir.

In 2000, he represented John McCain in his bid to gain access to the 2000 New York Republican presidential primary ballot and in 2001, Emery represented over 60,000 misdemeanor detainees in a case against New York City's strip search policy. Emery won the case and New York City agreed to pay $50 million to 50,000 people who had been illegally strip-searched. Emery also represented the three Jackson brothers starved by foster parents in New Jersey in K.J. et al. v. Division of Youth and Family Services et al.

In March 2004, Emery was appointed to the New York State Commission on Judicial Conduct, by New York State Senate Minority Leader John L. Sampson, and served until March 2016. In November 2006, newly elected Governor of New York Eliot Spitzer appointed Emery to his Transition Committee for Government Reform Issues.In 2007, Emery and residents of Manhattan's West End Avenue formed the West End Preservation Society to advocate for historic-district designation. The Landmarks Preservation Commission designated the area as a historic district in 2015. In 2008, Governor David Paterson appointed Emery to the New York State Commission on Public Integrity. In 2010, New York City agreed to pay $33 million to settle federal litigation concerning body-cavity searches of approximately 100,000 people arrested for minor offenses. Emery served as lead attorney for the plaintiffs..

In 2010, Emery won a civil rights lawsuit over strip searches performed on non-violent, low-level offenders at the Rikers Island jail facility. As a result of the lawsuit, the city agreed to pay $33 million on behalf of more than 100,000 plaintiffs. Emery represented Roger Clemens' trainer in a defamation lawsuit about steroid use and Duke lacrosse player Reade Seligmann in a civil suit for wrongful prosecution. Emery also represented Cooper Union in a suit to restore tuition-free education.

In 2014, Emery was appointed as the Chair of the New York City Civilian Complaint Review Board (CCRB) by the Mayor of New York City, Bill de Blasio. As the chairman of the CCRB, Emery had aggressive investigations conducted into police misconduct including the use of chokeholds, false statements made by police, and unlawful searches. Emery resigned from the Board on April 13, 2016.

Emery is a member of the City Club, an organization that works on preservation issues in New York City and represented the Club in its environmental suit to block a park Barry Diller planned to build in the Hudson River. He is also the founder and president of the West End Preservation Society. Emery has taught as an adjunct professor at the New York University and University of Washington schools of law as well as currently at Fordham University Law School and Cardozo Law School. Emery is a columnist for the New York Law Journal, writing on judicial conduct.

In 2024, Emery represented the City Club of New York in litigation challenging New York Governor Kathy Hochul's suspension of New York City's congestion pricing program. The lawsuit argued that postponing the implementation of congestion pricing violated state environmental review requirements and undermined statutory commitments intended to reduce traffic congestion and improve air quality. Emery became one of the principal public advocates in the litigation through press conferences and court proceedings.

Emery has continued to litigate major constitutional and civil rights cases through Emery Celli Brinckerhoff Abady Ward & Maazel LLP. In 2026, he and the firm filed a federal civil rights action alleging excessive force and unlawful arrest by officers of the New York City Police Department, continuing his longstanding focus on police accountability litigation.In 2025, Emery and partner Max Selver published an article in the New York Law Journal examining attacks on judicial independence and the constitutional role of an independent judiciary during periods of political conflict. The article reflects Emery's continuing involvement in legal commentary on constitutional governance beyond courtroom litigation.

=== Supreme court ===
Emery has been admitted to practice before the Supreme Court of the United States, the United States Courts of Appeals for the Second, Fifth, Ninth, and Federal Circuits, and federal district courts in New York and Washington. He is also admitted to the bars of New York and Washington. His practice has included civil rights, commercial litigation, election law, and litigation challenging governmental actions.

Among the matters identified in the firm's profile are Board of Estimate of the City of New York v. Morris, a United States Supreme Court case concerning the constitutional principle of one person, one vote, and litigation that resulted in a $50 million settlement concerning illegal strip searches of people arrested for minor offenses. The firm's profile also identifies Emery's work in commercial and civil-rights litigation and cases involving challenges to governmental action.

== Writings ==
Emery has written on civil liberties, policing, government accountability, constitutional law, and the criminal justice system. His published commentary includes opinion articles in The New York Times, where he addressed issues including police practices, anonymous juries, arrest quotas, and prosecutorial accountability. His articles include "Curbing New York's Police" (1985), "Giuliani's Unfair Tactics" (1985), "The Even Sadder New York Police Saga" (1987), and "Who's Policing the Prosecutors?" (2014).

== Personal life ==
He married actress Lori Singer in 1980. The couple had a son, Jacques Singer-Emery in 1991, before divorcing in 1996. Emery married Melania Levitsky in 2002 and had a daughter, Nikita Lev Emery in 2004, later divorcing in 2020. He is the grandson of mathematician Richard Courant and the stepson of the mathematician Jürgen Moser.

== Awards and honors ==
- 1987 - David S. Michaels Memorial Award, January 1987, for Courageous Effort in Promotion of Integrity in the Criminal Justice System from the Criminal Justice Section of the New York State Bar Association
- 1989 - The Park River Democrats Public Service Award, June 1989
- 1989 - "I Love an Ethical New York" Award
- 2000 - Common Cause/NY
- 2008 - Children's Rights Champion Award
- 2013 - Landmark West's Unsung Heroes Award for his preservation work
- 2016 - City & State NY's Responsible 100 Award

== Selected publications ==
- R. Emery, "Who's Policing the Prosecutors? Civil Forfeiture and Accountability," New York Times, December 10, 2014.
- R. Emery, "How we will police the police," New York Daily News, September 10, 2014.
- R. Emery, "Come to terms with Mike Bloomberg's move," New York Daily News, November 9, 2008.
- R. Emery & I. Maazel, "Why Civil Rights Lawsuits Do Not Deter Police Misconduct: The Conundrum of Indemnification and a Proposed Solution," 28 Fordham Urban Law Journal (2000).
- R. Emery & N. Morrison, "Five Cases Follow Traditional Course," New York Law Journal, October 2, 2000.
- R. Emery, "The Verdict: Poor Training and Supervision," New York Times, February 26, 2000.
- R. Emery, "Dazzling Crime Statistics Come at a Price," New York Times, February 19, 1999
- R. Emery & A. Celli, Jr., "Disorderly Conduct Statute and the First Amendment," New York Law Journal, October 20, 1997
- R. Emery, "Four Ways to Clean Up the Police," New York Times, August 26, 1997
- R. Emery, "Frank Askin, Defending Rights: A Life in Law and Politics," New York Law Journal, June 13, 1997
- R. Emery, "Adversary System: Cameras in the Courtroom after O.J.?" New York Times, October 18, 1995
- R. Emery, "Weighted Voting," 159 Touro Law Review (1989)
- R. Emery, "In New York City, Power to the People," New York Times, May 6, 1989
- R. Emery, "The Even Sadder New York Police Saga," New York Times, December 12, 1987
- R. Emery, "End New York City's One-Party System," New York Times, September 19, 1987
- R. Emery, "Giuliani's Unfair Tactics," New York Times, October 31, 1985
- R. Emery, "Curbing New York's Police," New York Times, May 7, 1985
- R. Emery, "Pointless Grand Jury Secrecy," New York Times, February 11, 1985
- R. Emery, "Recast New York's Board of Estimate," New York Times, September 15, 1984
- R. Emery, "Courts Can't Do It All," New York Times, July 16, 1983
- R. Emery & B.J. Ennis, The Rights of Mental Patients: An ACLU Handbook (New York: Avon Books, 1978).
