= List of accolades received by Good Will Hunting =

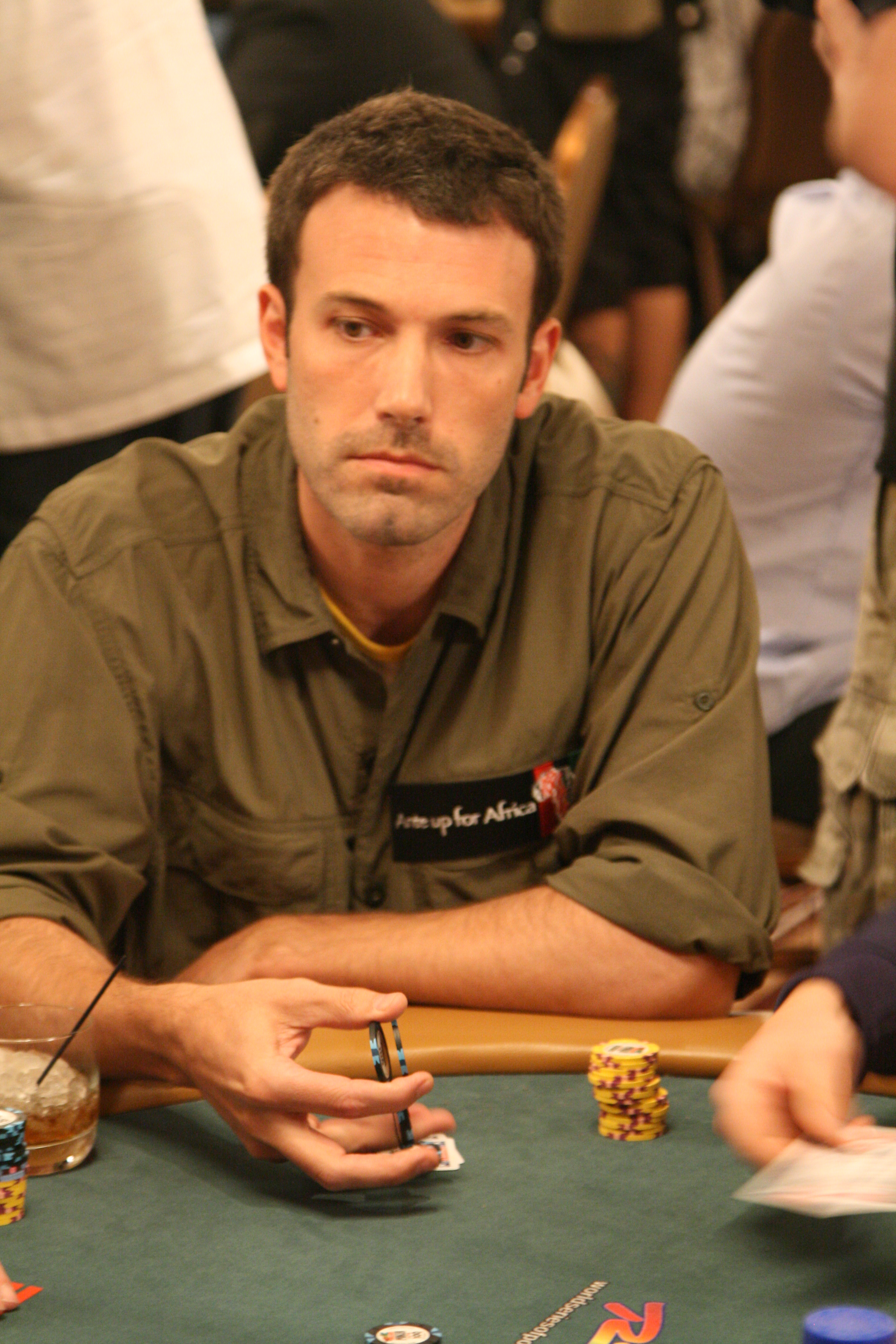
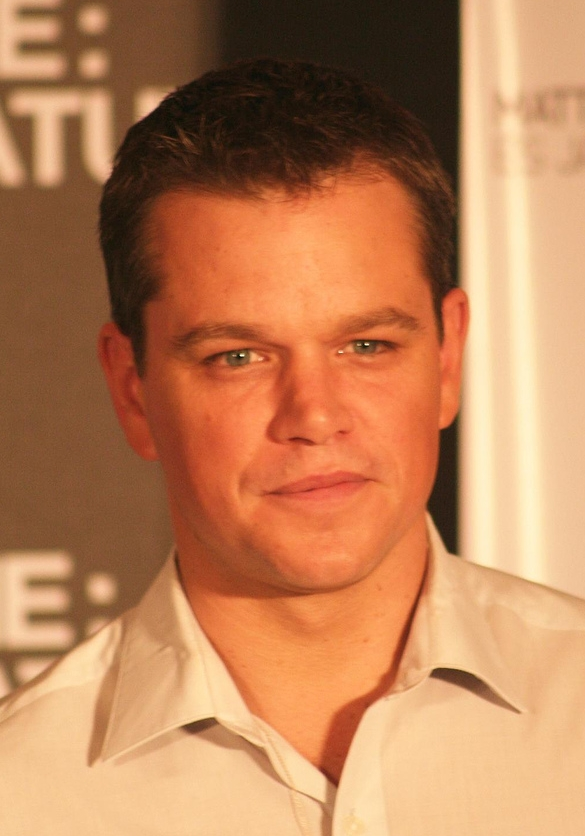
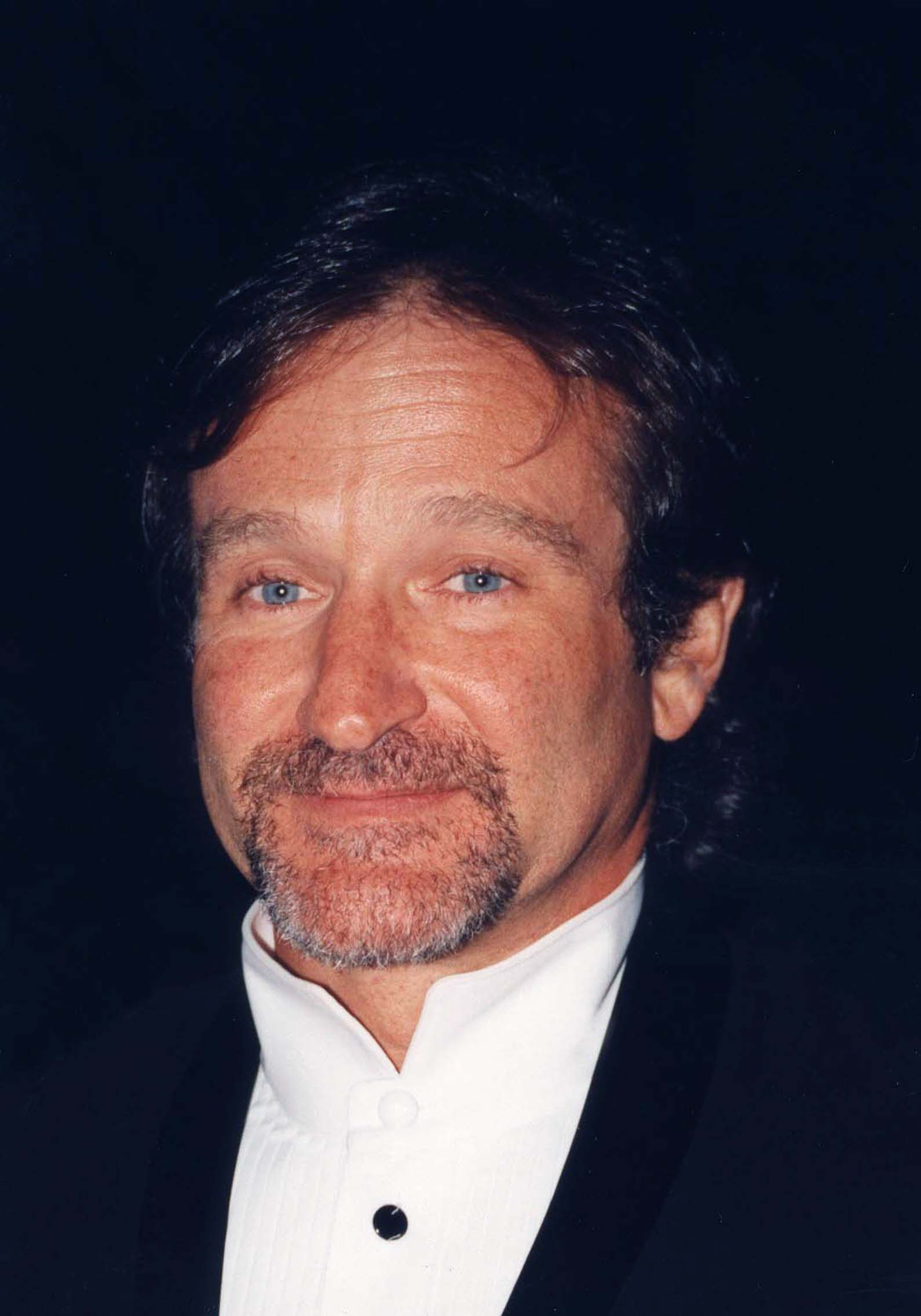
- Screenwriters Ben Affleck (left) and Matt Damon (center) and actor Robin Williams (right) won the Academy Awards for Best Original Screenplay and Best Supporting Actor for the film.
Accolades
Award	Wins	Nominations

Totals (Note: Certain award groups do not simply award one winner. They acknowledge several different recipients, have runners-up, and have third place. Since this is a specific recognition and is different from losing an award, runner-up mentions are considered wins in this award tally. For simplification and to avoid errors, each award in this list has been presumed to have had a prior nomination.)
- Wins: 25
- Nominations: 71

Good Will Hunting is a 1997 American drama film directed by Gus Van Sant and written by Ben Affleck and Matt Damon. It stars Robin Williams, Damon, Affleck, Stellan Skarsgård and Minnie Driver. The film tells the story of janitor Will Hunting, whose mathematical genius is discovered by a professor at MIT. It premiered on December 2, 1997, at the Bruin Theater in Westwood Village, Los Angeles. In the United States, the film received a limited release in seven theaters across New York and Los Angeles on December 5, 1998, meeting the submission deadline for the 70th Academy Awards at the last moment. It grossed $138 million and spent thirteen consecutive weeks among the top ten highest-grossing films of the week.

== Accolades ==
Award	Category	Nominee(s)	Result	Ref.
Academy Awards	Best Picture	Lawrence Bender	Nominated	
Academy Awards	Best Director	Gus Van Sant	Nominated	
Academy Awards	Best Actor	Matt Damon	Nominated	
Academy Awards	Best Supporting Actor	Robin Williams	Won	
Academy Awards	Best Supporting Actress	Minnie Driver	Nominated	
Academy Awards	Best Screenplay – Written Directly for the Screen	Matt Damon and Ben Affleck	Won	
Academy Awards	Best Film Editing	Pietro Scalia	Nominated	
Academy Awards	Best Original Dramatic Score	Danny Elfman	Nominated	
Academy Awards	Best Original Song	"Miss Misery"; Music and Lyrics by Elliott Smith	Nominated	
American Cinema Editors Awards	Best Edited Feature Film	Pietro Scalia	Nominated	
Berlin International Film Festival	Golden Bear	Gus Van Sant	Nominated	
Berlin International Film Festival	Outstanding Single Achievement	Matt Damon	Won	
Blockbuster Entertainment Awards	Favorite Actor – Video	Matt Damon	Won	
Blockbuster Entertainment Awards	Favorite Actress – Video	Minnie Driver	Nominated	
BMI Film & TV Awards	Film Music Award	Danny Elfman	Won	
Boston Society of Film Critics Awards	Best Screenplay	Matt Damon and Ben Affleck	3rd Place	
Chicago Film Critics Association Awards	Most Promising Actor	Ben Affleck	Nominated	
Chicago Film Critics Association Awards	Most Promising Actor	Matt Damon	Won	
Chlotrudis Awards	Best Screenplay	Matt Damon and Ben Affleck	Nominated	
Critics' Choice Awards	Best Picture		Nominated	
Critics' Choice Awards	Best Original Screenplay	Matt Damon and Ben Affleck	Won	
Critics' Choice Awards	Breakthrough Artist	Matt Damon	Won	
Dallas–Fort Worth Film Critics Association Awards	Best Film		Nominated	
Directors Guild of America Awards	Outstanding Directorial Achievement in Motion Pictures	Gus Van Sant	Nominated	
Empire Awards	Best Film		Nominated	
European Film Awards	Outstanding European Achievement in World Cinema	Stellan Skarsgård	Won	
Florida Film Critics Circle Awards	Best Newcomer	Matt Damon and Ben Affleck	Won	
Golden Globe Awards	Best Motion Picture – Drama		Nominated	
Golden Globe Awards	Best Actor in a Motion Picture – Drama	Matt Damon	Nominated	
Golden Globe Awards	Best Supporting Actor – Motion Picture	Robin Williams	Nominated	
Golden Globe Awards	Best Screenplay – Motion Picture	Matt Damon and Ben Affleck	Won	
Golden Reel Awards	Best Sound Editing – Music (Domestic and Foreign)	Kenneth Karman	Nominated	
Golden Trailer Awards	Best Drama		Won	
Humanitas Prize	Feature Film	Matt Damon and Ben Affleck	Won	
Japan Academy Film Prize	Outstanding Foreign Language Film		Nominated	
Key Art Awards	Home Entertainment Audio/Visual Trailer	R.D. Womack II	Won	
Las Vegas Film Critics Society Awards	Most Promising Actor	Matt Damon (also for The Rainmaker)	Won	
London Film Critics Circle Awards	Screenwriter of the Year	Matt Damon and Ben Affleck	Nominated	
London Film Critics Circle Awards	Actor of the Year	Matt Damon	Nominated	
London Film Critics Circle Awards	British Supporting Actress of the Year	Minnie Driver	Won (Note: Tied with Kate Beckinsale for The Last Days of Disco)	
MTV Movie Awards	Best Movie		Nominated	
MTV Movie Awards	Best Male Performance	Matt Damon	Nominated	
MTV Movie Awards	Best On-Screen Duo	Matt Damon and Ben Affleck	Nominated	
MTV Movie Awards	Best Kiss	Matt Damon and Minnie Driver	Nominated	
National Board of Review Awards	Top Ten Films		4th Place	
National Board of Review Awards	Special Achievement in Filmmaking	Matt Damon and Ben Affleck	Won	
Online Film & Television Association Awards	Best Picture	Lawrence Bender	Nominated	
Online Film & Television Association Awards	Best Drama Picture	Lawrence Bender	Nominated	
Online Film & Television Association Awards	Best Actor	Matt Damon	Nominated	
Online Film & Television Association Awards	Best Drama Actor	Matt Damon	Nominated	
Online Film & Television Association Awards	Best Supporting Actor	Robin Williams	Nominated	
Online Film & Television Association Awards	Best Original Screenplay	Matt Damon and Ben Affleck	Won	
Online Film & Television Association Awards	Best Ensemble		Nominated	
Online Film Critics Society Awards	Best Screenplay	Matt Damon and Ben Affleck	Nominated	
Producers Guild of America Awards	Outstanding Producer of Theatrical Motion Pictures	Lawrence Bender	Nominated	
Promax Awards	Home Entertainment Movie Promotion	R.D. Womack II	Nominated	
Russian Guild of Film Critics Awards	Best Foreign Actor	Matt Damon	Nominated	
Satellite Awards	Best Motion Picture – Drama		Nominated	
Satellite Awards	Best Director – Motion Picture	Gus Van Sant	Nominated	
Satellite Awards	Best Actor in a Motion Picture – Drama	Matt Damon	Nominated	
Satellite Awards	Best Supporting Actor in a Motion Picture – Drama	Robin Williams	Nominated	
Satellite Awards	Best Supporting Actress in a Motion Picture – Drama	Minnie Driver	Nominated	
Satellite Awards	Best Original Screenplay	Matt Damon and Ben Affleck	Won	
Screen Actors Guild Awards	Outstanding Performance by a Cast in a Motion Picture	Ben Affleck, Matt Damon, Minnie Driver, Stellan Skarsgård, and Robin Williams	Nominated	
Screen Actors Guild Awards	Outstanding Performance by a Male Actor in a Leading Role	Matt Damon	Nominated	
Screen Actors Guild Awards	Outstanding Performance by a Male Actor in a Supporting Role	Robin Williams	Won	
Screen Actors Guild Awards	Outstanding Performance by a Female Actor in a Supporting Role	Minnie Driver	Nominated	
Southeastern Film Critics Association Awards	Best Picture		8th Place	
Telly Awards	Best Drama Trailer	R.D. Womack II	Won	
Turkish Film Critics Association Awards	Best Foreign Film		16th Place	
Writers Guild of America Awards	Best Screenplay – Written Directly for the Screen	Matt Damon and Ben Affleck	Nominated	
