= Toronto Film Critics Association Awards 1997 =

Annual Canadian film awards ceremony

1st TFCA Awards

January 13, 1998

Best Film:
The Sweet Hereafter

The 1st Toronto Film Critics Association Awards, honoring the best in film for 1997, were held on 13 January 1998.

== Winners ==
- Best Actor:
  - Ian Holm - The Sweet Hereafter

Runner-Up: Jack Nicholson – As Good as It Gets

- Best Actress:
  - Helena Bonham Carter - The Wings of the Dove

Runner-Up: Sarah Polley – The Sweet Hereafter

- Best Canadian Film:
  - The Sweet Hereafter

Runners-Up: The Hanging Garden

- Best Director:
  - Atom Egoyan - The Sweet Hereafter

Runners-Up: Curtis Hanson – L.A. Confidential, Ang Lee – The Ice Storm, Paul Thomas Anderson – Boogie Nights and James Cameron – Titanic

- Best Film:
  - The Sweet Hereafter

Runner-Up: L.A. Confidential

- Clyde Gilmour Award:
  - Clyde Gilmour
