= Pushcart =

A pushcart is a cart that is pushed by one or more persons.

It may also refer to:

- Pushcart Press, a publishing house established in 1972
  - Pushcart Prize, an annual prize awarded for works printed by small presses
