= Garden State (novel) =

1992 novel by Rick Moody

- First edition
- Author: Rick Moody
- Language: English
- Genre: Novel
- Publisher: Pushcart Press
- Publication date: April 1992
- Publication place: United States
- Media type: Print (hardback & paperback)
- Pages: 224 pp
- ISBN: 0-916366-73-1 (first edition, hardback)
- OCLC: 25704008
- Followed by: The Ice Storm

Garden State is a 1992 novel by Rick Moody about a group of friends in suburban New Jersey struggling towards adulthood. It was awarded a Pushcart Press Editors' Book Award.

== Plot ==
The novel follows several young people in their early 20s in Haledon, New Jersey, through one spring. Although the exact year in which the novel is set is unclear, it appears to be the early 1980s. The protagonist is Alice, a 23-year-old woman who struggles to maintain a dating relationship with a man named Dennis. Dennis' stepbrother, Lane, recently attempted to commit suicide, and has just been released from a state mental institution following this attempt to end his life. Alice, Dennis, and Lane struggle to make the passage to adulthood even as their families and the economy crumble around them, and new social mores, music and politics tempt them in different directions.
