= The Ice Storm (film) =

1997 film by Ang Lee

- Theatrical release poster
- Directed by: Ang Lee
- Screenplay by: James Schamus
- Based on: The Ice Storm by Rick Moody
- Produced by: Ted Hope; James Schamus; Ang Lee
- Starring: Kevin Kline; Joan Allen; Henry Czerny; Adam Hann-Byrd; Tobey Maguire; Christina Ricci; Jamey Sheridan; Elijah Wood; Sigourney Weaver
- Cinematography: Frederick Elmes
- Edited by: Tim Squyres
- Music by: Mychael Danna
- Production companies: Fox Searchlight Pictures; Good Machine; Canal+ Image International
- Distributed by: 20th Century Fox
- Release dates: May 12, 1997 (Cannes); September 27, 1997 (United States)
- Running time: 113 minutes
- Country: United States
- Language: English
- Budget: $18 million
- Box office: $16 million

The Ice Storm is a 1997 American drama film directed by Ang Lee and written by James Schamus adapting the 1994 novel The Ice Storm by Rick Moody. During Thanksgiving in 1973, two neighboring suburban families seek escape from their emotional emptiness through infidelity and self-indulgence. The film stars Kevin Kline, Joan Allen, Tobey Maguire, Christina Ricci, Elijah Wood, Katie Holmes, Glenn Fitzgerald, Jamey Sheridan, and Sigourney Weaver. The film was produced by Fox Searchlight Pictures on a budget of $18 million.

The film premiered on May 12, 1997, at the 1997 Cannes Film Festival, where Schamus won the Cannes Film Festival Award for Best Screenplay. Fox Searchlight gave the film a limited theatrical release in the United States on September 27, 1997. It grossed $8 million in the U.S., and it grossed $8 million outside the US for a worldwide total of $16 million. Among other accolades, Weaver won the BAFTA Award for Best Actress in a Supporting Role.

== Plot ==
In 1973, two families in an affluent Connecticut suburb experiment with swinging and substance use over one Thanksgiving weekend. One family, the Hoods, consists of parents Ben and Elena and their children, Paul and Wendy. Ben is dissatisfied with his marriage and his career.

The other family, Jim and Janey Carver and their sons, Mikey and Sandy, are the Hoods' neighbors and friends. Ben is having an affair with Janey to deal with his midlife dissatisfaction. His wife, Elena, is also bored with her life and looking to bring some excitement back, but is unsure how to do so. Young Wendy Hood enjoys sexual games with the Carver boys and with her school peers. Paul Hood has fallen for Libbets Casey, a classmate at the boarding school he attends, though his roommate Francis is also interested in her. Ben thinks Mikey Carver is odd and withdrawn, while Sandy, the younger one, experiments with dangerous objects like toy explosives.

When Janey does not show up for a tryst one day, Ben accuses her of losing interest in the affair. Janey reasons she can't put the tasks and errands of her own family on hold for him. On the Friday night after Thanksgiving, the Hoods have an argument when Elena realizes her husband is having an affair with Janey. Despite the tension between them, the couple goes ahead with plans to attend a neighborhood party. Jim and Janey Carver also attend. It turns out to be a "key party", in which married couples swap sexual partners through each woman selecting from a bowl a set of car keys contributed by each man.

Ben drinks increasingly as the party progresses. When Janey chooses the keys of a younger man, a drunken Ben becomes agitated and trips on the floor. After being helped up, he retreats to the bathroom to sober up, remaining there for the rest of the evening. Meanwhile, a winter storm begins to descend upon the neighborhood.

The other key party participants pair off and leave until only Jim and Elena remain. She retrieves Jim's keys from the bowl and returns them to him. After debating the issue, Jim and Elena leave together, engaging in a quick, clumsy sexual encounter in the front seat of Jim's car. Jim, regretting the line they just crossed, offers to drive Elena home.

Wendy makes her way to the Carvers' to see Mikey, but he has ventured out into the ice storm. She finds Sandy, who has a crush on her, alone at home. She asks Sandy to climb into bed with her, and they remove their clothing. They drink from a bottle of vodka, and after Sandy proclaims his love for Wendy, they fall asleep together.

Paul is invited to Libbets's Manhattan apartment, but upon arriving, he is disappointed to learn that Francis was also invited. Throughout the night, the trio drinks beer and listens to music. Francis and Libbets also take prescription pills found in Libbets's mother's medicine cabinet. Paul confesses his feelings for Libbets, and in her stupor, she tells Paul she thinks of him as a brother. Paul leaves Libbets and Francis passed out in the apartment and just barely makes the train back to New Canaan.

Meanwhile, Mikey, out walking in the storm, is enchanted by the beauty of the trees and fields covered in ice. He slides down an icy hill and sits on a guardrail. A moment later, a falling tree takes down a power line, which connects with the guardrail, fatally electrocuting him.

Jim and Elena also get stuck due to fallen trees and return to the Carvers' house as dawn breaks. Elena walks in on her daughter in bed with Sandy and tells Wendy to get dressed. Janey has also returned home but is curled up in bed in the fetal position, still wearing her party dress.

A sober Ben is driving back to his house when he discovers Mikey's body on the side of the road. He carries the body to the Carvers' house, and the two families are drawn together in grief. Wendy hugs the shocked and numbed Sandy in an attempt to comfort him. Jim is devastated, while Janey remains asleep, not yet knowing the news. Ben, Elena, and Wendy later drive to New Canaan station to pick up Paul, whose train was delayed by the power outage. Once all four are together in the car, Ben breaks down and sobs uncontrollably at the wheel as Elena comforts him, and the kids look on.

== Cast ==
- Kevin Kline as Ben Hood
- Joan Allen as Elena Hood
- Tobey Maguire as Paul Hood
- Christina Ricci as Wendy Hood
- Jamey Sheridan as Jim Carver
- Sigourney Weaver as Janey Carver
- Elijah Wood as Mikey Carver
- Adam Hann-Byrd as Sandy Carver
- Henry Czerny as George Clair
- David Krumholtz as Francis Davenport
- Michael Cumpsty as Philip Edwards
- Kate Burton as Dorothy Franklin
- Katie Holmes as Libbets Casey
- Glenn Fitzgerald as Neil Conrad
- Allison Janney as Dot Halford
- Larry Pine as Dave Gorman

== Production ==
=== Development ===
The Ice Storm was first brought to the attention of producer James Schamus by his wife, literary scout Nancy Kricorian, who knew Rick Moody from Columbia University's MFA program. Schamus said: "It's an astonishingly cinematic book ... But, because of its truly literary qualities, people may have missed its extraordinary cinematic possibilities." Philosopher Slavoj Žižek has stated that Schamus was also inspired by one of Žižek's books at the time of writing the screenplay, commenting "When James Schamus was writing the scenario, he told me that he was reading a book of mine and that my theoretical book was inspiration."

Schamus brought the book to filmmaker Ang Lee, who was the first and only contender to turn the book into a film, and with whom Schamus and partner Ted Hope had already made four films, including The Wedding Banquet in 1993. Despite the obvious appeal of Moody's comedy of familial errors, Lee stated that what attracted him to the book was its climax: the scene where Ben Hood makes a shocking discovery on the ice, followed by the emotional reunion of the Hood family on the morning after the storm. "The book moved me at those two points", says Lee. "I knew there was a movie there."

To prepare for the film, Lee had the cast members study stacks of magazine cutouts from the early 1970s.

=== Filming ===
Principal photography primarily took place in New Canaan and Westchester, New York, and began in April 1996. The ice storm scenes were filmed using a second-unit team prior to the main shoot. Said Schamus: "Hoping it would be below freezing, we drove up through Connecticut at night with a bunch of hoses and a water truck that we used to wet down streets and trees to get ice. On one of those nights, we actually encountered the only real ice storm to hit that area in 30 years. We got some terrific footage of the real thing. However, it soon turned into a snowstorm, and we couldn't use most of what we filmed. We digitally removed the snow from the ground in a few shots, and about five of those are in the finished film." Most of the professional music featured in the film was independently produced 1970s-type music, as budget values were tight. Lee and Schamus wanted to have an "actual score", not a "nostalgic film with radio music of an earlier time".

== Release ==
Despite an original release date of December 20, 1996, Fox Searchlight Pictures gave The Ice Storm a limited theatrical release in the United States on September 26, 1997, and it grossed $8 million in its theatrical run. Outside the United States, it grossed another $8 million for a worldwide total of $16 million.

== Critical reception ==
On the review aggregator website Rotten Tomatoes, 86% of 72 critics' reviews are positive. The website's consensus reads: "Director Ang Lee revisits the ennui-laden decadence of 1970s suburban America with deft humor and gripping pathos." On Metacritic it has a score of 72 out of 100 based on reviews from 23 critics, which indicates "generally favorable reviews".

Film critics Gene Siskel and Roger Ebert gave the film "Two Thumbs Up", with Ebert calling it Lee's best work yet, and Siskel calling it his favorite film of 1997.

Andrew Johnston, writing in Time Out New York, stated: "The 1970s have long been written off as a goofy embarrassment to our country, quite possibly because the actual details of the decade are too painful to us to remember, no matter how old or young we were at the time. Ang Lee's film of Rick Moody's novel cuts through the kitsch to explore the emotional black hole at the heart of the period, the result being an utterly devastating and truly adult drama of the first order."

Janet Maslin of The New York Times wrote: "Beautifully acted as it is, The Ice Storm still elects to keep its characters and their emotions at a distance. They remain as hidden from the viewer as they are from one another, which is an essential part of the film's disturbing power. Lee daringly chooses to keep his story's motivational mysteries unexplained, leaving this richly observed film open to the viewer's assessments." She added Schamus "shows particular empathy for the women" and that the film "elicits mournfully fine performances from actresses coming to terms with the film's shaky era. Ms. Weaver shows both hard glamour and desperation in a brittle, striking role. Ms. Allen, especially poignant and graceful, conveys the sad dignity of a woman who can't help being well behind her changing times. And the talented Ms. Ricci makes Wendy a touchingly real malcontent and a ticking time bomb. This story's legacy rests with her."

In a 2022 retrospective for Little White Lies, Kevin Bui wrote that, unlike many films that also dealt with suburban dysfunction, The Ice Storm is "primarily focused on the sadness of its ensemble; their despondency to the prospect of change and the fear of the unknown. But what truly separates it from other movies of its ilk is the way it ends with its family united, rather than being torn further apart."

== Accolades ==
Year	Award	Category	Nominee(s)	Result	Ref.
1997	ACCA Awards	Best Screenplay	James Schamus	Nominated	
1997	ACCA Awards	Best Cinematography	Frederick Elmes	Nominated	
1997	ACCA Awards	Honourable Mentions	The Ice Storm	Nominated	
1997	Cannes Film Festival	Best Screenplay	James Schamus	Won	
1997	Cannes Film Festival	Palme d'Or	Ang Lee	Nominated	
1998	AFI Awards	Best Foreign Film	Ted Hope, James Schamus, Ang Lee	Nominated	
1998	Artios Awards	Feature Film Casting – Drama	Avy Kaufman	Nominated	
1998	BAFTA Awards	Best Adapted Screenplay	James Schamus	Nominated	
1998	BAFTA Awards	Best Actress in a Supporting Role	Sigourney Weaver	Won	
1998	CFCA Awards	Best Supporting Actress	Joan Allen	Nominated	
1998	CFCA Awards	Best Director	Ang Lee	Nominated	
1998	CFCA Awards	Best Cinematography	Frederick Elmes	Nominated	
1998	Chlotrudis Awards	Best Cinematography	Frederick Elmes	Nominated	
1998	Chlotrudis Awards	Best Director	Ang Lee	Nominated	
1998	Chlotrudis Awards	Best Supporting Actress	Christina Ricci	Nominated	
1998	FFCC Awards	Best Film	The Ice Storm	Runner-up	
1998	Golden Globe Awards	Best Supporting Actress – Motion Picture	Sigourney Weaver	Nominated	
1998	Guldbagge Awards	Best Foreign Film	The Ice Storm	Won	
1998	OFCS Awards	Top 10 Films of the Year	The Ice Storm	8th Place	
1998	OFTA Awards	Best Supporting Actress	Christina Ricci	Nominated	
1998	OFTA Awards	Best Adapted Screenplay	James Schamus	Nominated	
1998	SFFCC Awards	Best Supporting Actress	Sigourney Weaver	Won	
1998	Satellite Awards	Best Actress – Motion Picture	Joan Allen	Nominated	
1998	Satellite Awards	Best Supporting Actress – Motion Picture	Sigourney Weaver	Nominated	
1998	Satellite Awards	Best Adapted Screenplay	James Schamus	Nominated	
1998	SEFCA Awards	Best Picture	The Ice Storm	9th Place	
1998	SIYAD Awards	Best Foreign Film	The Ice Storm	Won	
1998	TFCA Awards	Best Director	Ang Lee	Nominated	
1998	WGA Awards	Best Adapted Screenplay	James Schamus	Nominated	
1998	Young Artist Award	Best Performance in a Feature Film: Supporting Young Actress	Christina Ricci	Nominated	
1998	Young Artist Award	Best Performance in a Feature Film: Supporting Young Actor	Elijah Wood	Nominated	
1998	YoungStar Award	Best Young Actress in a Drama Film	Christina Ricci	Nominated	
1999	Bodil Awards	Best American Film	Ang Lee	Won	
1999	Critics' Circle Film Awards	Film of the Year	The Ice Storm	Nominated	
1999	Critics' Circle Film Awards	Actor of the Year (shared with In & Out)	Kevin Kline	Nominated	
1999	Critics' Circle Film Awards	Actress of the Year	Joan Allen	Nominated	
1999	Critics' Circle Film Awards	Director of the Year	Ang Lee	Nominated	
1999	Critics' Circle Film Awards	Screenwriter of the Year	James Schamus	Nominated	
2018	20/20 Awards	Best Supporting Actress	Sigourney Weaver	Nominated	
2018	20/20 Awards	Best Production Design	Mark Friedburg	Nominated	

== Home media ==
Following the theatrical exhibition of The Ice Storm, the film was made available on home video by 20th Century Fox Home Entertainment on October 13, 1998. A re-issued VHS was released on September 5, 2000. The film made its DVD debut on March 13, 2001, before American distribution company Criterion acquired the rights to release a special 2-disc DVD edition as part of the Criterion Collection on March 18, 2008. Criterion released this version in a Blu-ray format on July 23, 2013.

== Bibliography ==
- Pennington, Jody W. (2007). The history of sex in American film. Greenwood Publishing Group. pp. 152, 158–159, 168–172. ISBN 978-0-275-99226-2.
