= San Diego Film Critics Society Awards 1997 =

Annual US film awards ceremony

2nd SDFCS Awards

December 18, 1997

Best Film:
L.A. Confidential

The 2nd San Diego Film Critics Society Awards, given by the San Diego Film Critics Society on 18 December 1997, honored the best in film for 1997.

== Winners ==
- Best Actor:
  - Jack Nicholson – As Good as It Gets
- Best Actress:
  - Pam Grier – Jackie Brown
- Best Director:
  - James Cameron – Titanic
- Best Film:
  - L.A. Confidential
- Best Screenplay – Adapted:
  - L.A. Confidential – Brian Helgeland and Curtis Hanson
- Best Screenplay – Original:
  - As Good as It Gets – James L. Brooks
- Best Supporting Actor:
  - Burt Reynolds – Boogie Nights
- Best Supporting Actress:
  - Jurnee Smollett – Eve's Bayou
- Special Award for Body of Work:
  - Samuel L. Jackson
