= Bill Henderson (publisher) =

American author and publisher

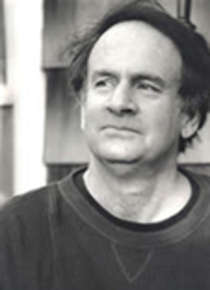
- Born: April 5, 1941 (age 85); Philadelphia, PA
- Education: Hamilton College (BA) Harvard University University of Pennsylvania
- Writing career
- Subjects: Memoirs, publishing, editing
- Website: www.billhendersonscribe.com

Bill Henderson (born April 5, 1941) is an American author, editor and publisher best known for his memoirs and the Pushcart Prize series.

== Publisher ==
Bill Henderson is founder and editor of Pushcart Press, publisher of the annual Pushcart Prize: Best of the Small Presses. His anthology, featuring fiction, poetry and essays, has earned national recognition and is celebrating its 40th anniversary. Pushcart Press was awarded the 1979 Carey Thomas Prize for Publisher of the Year by Publishers Weekly.

He has also edited and published many other books, including The Publish-It-Yourself Handbook (1973), The Art of Literary Publishing (1980), and Rotten Reviews (1986) a look at negative reviews of now-classic literature, and Minutes of the Lead Pencil Club (1995)

== Awards ==
Henderson received the 2005 Ivan Sandrof Lifetime Achievement Award from the National Book Critics Circle and the 2006 Poets & Writers/Barnes & Noble's "Writers for Writers." He was awarded the American Academy of Arts and Letters 2020 citation for Distinguished Service to the Arts.

== Author ==
Henderson is the author of the novel The Kid That Could (1970); and the memoirs His Son (1980); Her Father (1995); Tower (2000); Simple Gifts (2006); and All My Dogs: A Life (2011). His most recent memoir, Cathedral: An Illness and a Healing was published in 2014. Two New York Times articles detail Tower and Cathedral.

== Personal life ==
Henderson lives on the East End of Long Island and in Maine with his wife, Genie Chipps Henderson. His daughter, Lily Frances Henderson, is a filmmaker and director based in Brooklyn, New York. He owns and runs "The World's Smallest Bookstore", located in Sedgwick, Maine.
