= Pushcart Press =

American publishing house

- Founded: 1972; 53 years ago
- Founder: Bill Henderson
- Country of origin: United States
- Headquarters location: Wainscott, New York
- Distribution: W. W. Norton & Company
- Publication types: Books
- Official website: www.pushcartprize.com/pushcartpress.html

Pushcart Press is a publishing house established in 1972 by Bill Henderson (a one-time associate editor at Doubleday) and is perhaps most famous for its Pushcart Prize and for the anthology of prize winners it publishes annually.

== History ==
Bill Henderson started Pushcart Press in 1972 in his apartment in Yonkers, New York.

Pushcart Press celebrated its 50th anniversary in 2022.

== Recognition ==
The press has been honored by Publishers Weekly as one of the USA's "most influential publishers" with the 1979 Carey Thomas Prize for publisher of the year. It has also won the 2005 Lifetime Achievement Award from the National Book Critics Circle and the 2006 Poets & Writers/Barnes & Noble Writers for Writers Prize.

== Books ==
- Garden State (1992) by Rick Moody
