= Boogie Nights =

1997 film by Paul Thomas Anderson

- Theatrical release poster
- Directed by: Paul Thomas Anderson
- Written by: Paul Thomas Anderson
- Produced by: Lloyd Levin; John Lyons; Paul Thomas Anderson; JoAnne Sellar
- Starring: Mark Wahlberg; Julianne Moore; Burt Reynolds; Don Cheadle; John C. Reilly; William H. Macy; Heather Graham; Nicole Ari Parker; Philip Seymour Hoffman
- Cinematography: Robert Elswit
- Edited by: Dylan Tichenor
- Music by: Michael Penn
- Production companies: Lawrence Gordon Productions; Ghoulardi Film Company
- Distributed by: New Line Cinema
- Release dates: September 11, 1997 (TIFF); October 10, 1997 (United States)
- Running time: 155 minutes
- Country: United States
- Language: English
- Budget: $15 million
- Box office: $43.1 million

Boogie Nights is a 1997 American comedy-drama film written, directed, and co-produced by Paul Thomas Anderson. It is set in Los Angeles' San Fernando Valley and concerns a young nightclub dishwasher who becomes a popular star of pornographic films, chronicling his rise in the Golden Age of Porn of the 1970s through his fall during the excesses of the 1980s. The film is an expansion of Anderson's mockumentary short film The Dirk Diggler Story (1988), and stars Mark Wahlberg, Julianne Moore, Burt Reynolds, Don Cheadle, John C. Reilly, William H. Macy, Philip Seymour Hoffman, Nicole Ari Parker, and Heather Graham.

Boogie Nights premiered at the Toronto International Film Festival on September 11, 1997, and was theatrically released by New Line Cinema on October 10, 1997, garnering critical acclaim and grossing $43.1 million against a $15 million budget. It was nominated for three Academy Awards, including Best Original Screenplay for Anderson, Best Supporting Actress for Moore, and Best Supporting Actor for Reynolds. The film's soundtrack also received acclaim. It has since been considered one of Anderson's best works, and one of the best films of all time by Variety.

== Plot ==
In 1977, high-school dropout Eddie Adams lives in Torrance, California with his parents. His mother is an alcoholic who is emotionally and physically abusive. Eddie works as a dishwasher at a Reseda nightclub owned by Maurice Rodriguez, where he meets porn filmmaker Jack Horner. Interested in bringing Eddie into the industry, Jack auditions the latter by watching him have sex with "Rollergirl", a porn starlet who wears roller skates.

After a fight with his mother, Eddie moves into Jack's San Fernando Valley home. Eddie gives himself the screen name "Dirk Diggler" and becomes a star due to his good looks, youthful charisma, and abnormally large penis. His success allows him to buy a new house, an extensive wardrobe, and a "competition orange" 1977 Chevrolet Corvette. With his friend and co-star Reed Rothchild, Dirk pitches a series of successful action-themed porn films. He works and socializes with others from the porn industry, and they live carefree lifestyles in the late 1970s disco era.

Dirk tries cocaine for the first time on New Year's Eve 1979, while assistant director "Little" Bill Thompson discovers his adulterous wife having sex with another man. Tired of being cheated on repeatedly, Bill retrieves a gun from his car and murders the pair and then commits suicide by turning the gun on himself.

In early 1983, Dirk and Reed soon begin using cocaine on a regular basis. Due to his drug use, Dirk finds it increasingly difficult to achieve an erection and falls into violent mood swings. Dirk becomes irritated with Johnny Doe, a rival leading man recruited by Jack, who he worries will replace him. After a tense argument with Jack, Dirk is fired and takes off with Reed to start a music career along with Scotty, a boom operator who is in love with Dirk.

Jack rejects business overtures from Floyd Gondolli, a local theater magnate who insists on cutting costs by shooting on videotape rather than film stock, because Jack believes that video will diminish the quality of his films. However, after his friend and financier Colonel James is incarcerated for possession of child pornography, Jack agrees to cooperate with him, quickly becoming disillusioned with the new work. One project involves Jack and Rollergirl riding in a limousine and finding random men for her to have sex with while being taped. One man recognizes Rollergirl as a former high-school classmate and, after a failed attempt at intercourse, insults her and Jack about their pornography career. Both Jack and Rollergirl attack the man, leaving him bloodied on the sidewalk.

Meanwhile, leading actress Amber Waves loses a custody battle to her ex-husband as the court determines that she is an unfit mother due to her involvement in the porn industry, criminal record, and cocaine addiction. Buck Swope marries fellow porn star Jessie St. Vincent, who becomes pregnant. Because of his past as a pornographer, Buck is disqualified from a bank loan and cannot open his own stereo equipment store. That night, he finds himself in the middle of a holdup at a donut shop in which the clerk, the robber, and an armed customer are killed. Buck is the sole survivor and escapes with the money.

Having spent most of their money on drugs, Dirk and Reed are unable to pay a recording studio in order to make demo tapes. Desperate, Dirk attempts prostitution but he is assaulted and robbed by three men. Dirk, Reed, and their friend Todd Parker attempt to scam local drug dealer Rahad Jackson at his estate by selling him a half-kilo of baking soda disguised as cocaine. Dirk and Reed intend to leave quickly before Rahad's bodyguard can inspect the fake cocaine, but a drugged-up and armed Todd attempts to steal more money from Rahad, and a gunfight ensues, in which Todd kills Rahad's bodyguard. When Todd chases Rahad into his room, Rahad kills him with a shotgun. Dirk and Reed narrowly escape. Dirk returns to Jack's home and they reconcile.

By 1984, things cool down. Amber shoots a television commercial for the opening of Buck's store, Rollergirl takes a GED class, Maurice opens a nightclub with his brothers, Reed performs magic acts at a strip club, Jessie gives birth to her and Buck's son, and Dirk, Jack, and Amber prepare to start filming again, hopeful for the future of their careers.

== Cast ==
- Mark Wahlberg as Eddie Adams / Dirk Diggler
- Julianne Moore as Maggie / Amber Waves
- Burt Reynolds as Jack Horner
- Don Cheadle as Buck Swope
- John C. Reilly as Reed Rothchild
- William H. Macy as Little Bill
- Heather Graham as Brandy / Rollergirl
- Nicole Ari Parker as Becky Barnett
- Philip Seymour Hoffman as Scotty J.
- Luis Guzmán as Maurice Rodriguez / T. T. Rodriguez
- Philip Baker Hall as Floyd Gondolli
- Thomas Jane as Todd Parker
- Robert Ridgely as The Colonel James
- Robert Downey Sr. as Burt
- Nina Hartley as Little Bill's wife
- Melora Walters as Jessie St. Vincent
- Alfred Molina as Rahad Jackson
- Ricky Jay as Kurt Longjohn
- Joanna Gleason as Dirk's mother
- Laurel Holloman as Sheryl Lynn
- Michael Jace as Jerome
- Michael Penn as Nick

== Production ==
Boogie Nights is based on a mockumentary short film that Paul Thomas Anderson wrote and directed while he was still in high school called The Dirk Diggler Story. The short itself was based on the 1981 documentary Exhausted: John C. Holmes, The Real Story, a documentary about the life of legendary porn actor John Holmes, on whom Dirk Diggler is based.

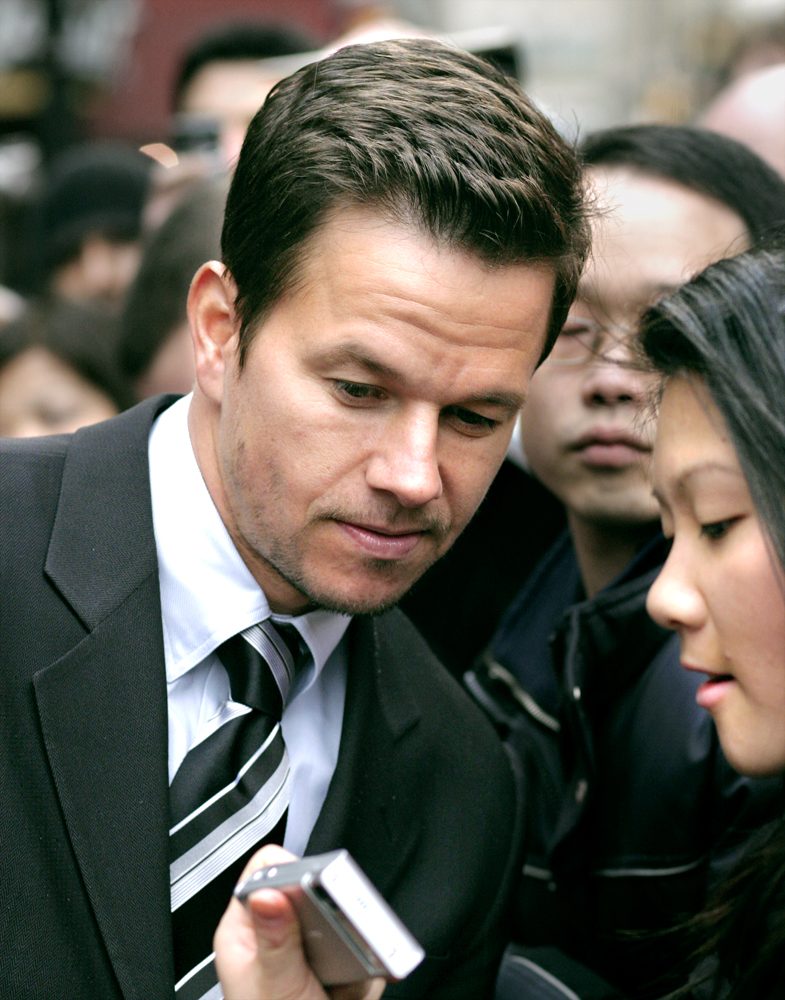
Boogie Nights helped establish Wahlberg as a film actor; he was previously only known as the frontman of Marky Mark and the Funky Bunch

Anderson originally wanted the role of Eddie to be played by Leonardo DiCaprio, after seeing him in The Basketball Diaries. DiCaprio enjoyed the screenplay, but had to turn it down because he had signed on to star in James Cameron's Titanic. He recommended his Basketball Diaries co-star Mark Wahlberg for the role. DiCaprio would later say that he wished he had done both and would later call turning down the film the biggest regret of his career. He would eventually work with Anderson starring in One Battle After Another. Joaquin Phoenix was also offered the role of Eddie, but he declined it due to concerns about playing a porn star. Phoenix later collaborated with Anderson on the films The Master and Inherent Vice. Sean Penn, composer Michael Penn's brother, was offered the role of Rahad Jackson, but declined it, and like DiCaprio and Phoenix, he went on to work with Anderson on other films, Licorice Pizza and One Battle After Another.

Bill Murray, Harvey Keitel, Warren Beatty, Albert Brooks, and Sydney Pollack declined or were passed up on the role of Jack Horner, which went to Burt Reynolds. After starring in Hard Eight, Samuel L. Jackson declined the role of Buck Swope, which went to Don Cheadle. Anderson initially did not consider Heather Graham for Rollergirl, because he had never seen her do nudity in a film. However, Graham's agent called Anderson asking if she could read for the part, which she won. Gwyneth Paltrow, Drew Barrymore, and Tatum O'Neal were also up for the role.

After having a very difficult time getting his previous film, Hard Eight, released, Anderson laid down a hard law when making Boogie Nights. He initially wanted the film to be over three hours long and be rated NC-17. The film's producers, particularly Michael De Luca, said that the film had to be either under three hours or rated R. Anderson fought with them, saying that the film would not have a mainstream appeal no matter what. They did not change their minds, and Anderson chose the R rating as a challenge. Despite this, the film was still 25 minutes shorter than promised.

Reynolds did not get along with Anderson while filming. After seeing a rough cut of the film, Reynolds allegedly fired his agent for recommending it. Despite this, Reynolds won a Golden Globe Award and was nominated for an Academy Award for his performance. Later, Anderson wanted Reynolds to star in his next film Magnolia, but Reynolds declined it. In 2012, Reynolds denied rumors that he disliked the film, calling it "extraordinary" and saying that his opinion of it has nothing to do with his relationship with Anderson. According to Wahlberg, Reynolds wanted his character Jack Horner to have an Irish accent, which he used for the character on his first day of shooting, before dropping it on the next day.

According to Thomas Jane, who played Todd Parker in the film, the character Cosmo throwing firecrackers throughout the drug deal scene was not originally in the script, but was written for Anderson's friend Joe G. M. Chan, whom Anderson had seen randomly throwing firecrackers at a party before asking him to appear in the film. Jane also said that Reynolds had attempted to knee him in the crotch during filming due to Anderson keeping the camera rolling after the end of the take, with Jane taunting him as part of a prank. Reynolds sent a six pack of beer to Jane's trailer as an apology.

== Release ==
The film premiered at the Toronto International Film Festival and New York Film Festival, before opening on two screens in the United States on October 10, 1997. It grossed $50,168 during its opening weekend. Three weeks later, it expanded to 907 theaters and grossed $4.7 million, ranking number four for the week. It eventually earned $26.4 million in the United States and $16.7 million in foreign markets for a worldwide box office total of $43.1 million. After its usual pay TV partner of New Line Cinema, Starz, backed down the rights to air the movie due to concerns of runtime, it was picked up by HBO for pay television showings.

Boogie Nights was released on VHS in 1998, DVD in 2000, and Blu-ray in 2010, and Ultra HD Blu-ray on December 16, 2025.

== Reception ==
=== Critical response ===
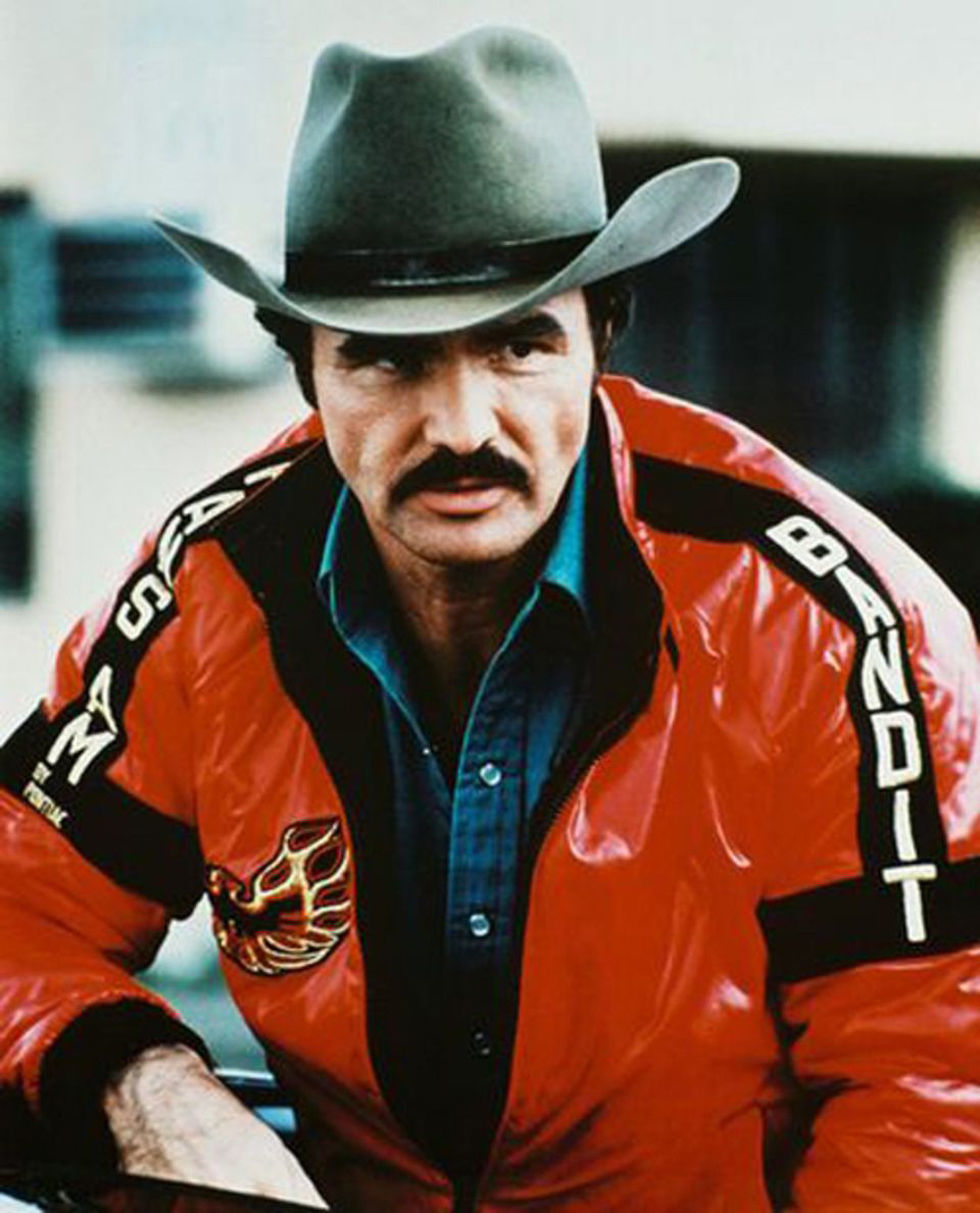
Reynolds received over ten accolades for his performance, including a Golden Globe Award, in addition to nominations for an Academy Award, and a Screen Actors Guild Award.

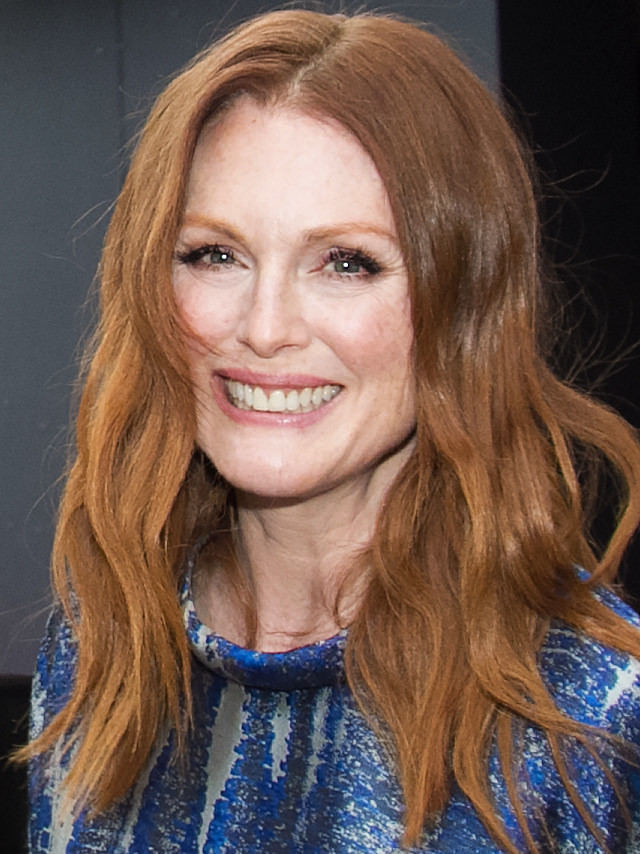
Moore received Supporting Actress nominations for an Academy Award, Golden Globe Award, and Screen Actors Guild Award for her performance

On review aggregator Rotten Tomatoes, Boogie Nights holds an approval rating of 91% based on 155 reviews. The site's critical consensus states, "Grounded in strong characters, bold themes, and subtle storytelling, Boogie Nights is a groundbreaking film both for director P.T. Anderson and star Mark Wahlberg." On Metacritic, the film holds a weighted average score of 87 out of 100, based on 29 critics, indicating "universal acclaim". Audiences polled by CinemaScore gave the film an average grade of "C" on an A+ to F scale.

Janet Maslin of The New York Times wrote, "Everything about Boogie Nights is interestingly unexpected," although "the film's extravagant 2-hour 32-minute length amounts to a slight tactical mistake ... [it] has no trouble holding interest ... but the length promises larger ideas than the film finally delivers." She praised Burt Reynolds for "his best and most suavely funny performance in many years," and added, "The movie's special gift happens to be Mark Wahlberg, who gives a terrifically appealing performance."

Roger Ebert of the Chicago Sun-Times observed:

Few films have been more matter-of-fact, even disenchanted, about sexuality. Adult films are a business here, not a dalliance or a pastime, and one of the charms of Boogie Nights is the way it shows the everyday backstage humdrum life of porno filmmaking ... The sweep and variety of the characters have brought the movie comparisons to Robert Altman's Nashville and The Player. There is also some of the same appeal as Pulp Fiction in scenes that balance precariously between comedy and violence ... Through all the characters and all the action, Anderson's screenplay centers on the human qualities of the players ... Boogie Nights has the quality of many great films, in that it always seems alive.

Mick LaSalle of the San Francisco Chronicle stated, "Boogie Nights is the first great film about the 1970s to come out since the '70s ... It gets all the details right, nailing down the styles and the music. More impressive, it captures the decade's distinct, decadent glamour ... [It] also succeeds at something very difficult: re-creating the ethos and mentality of an era ... Paul Thomas Anderson ... has pulled off a wonderful, sprawling, sophisticated film ... With Boogie Nights, we know we're not just watching episodes from disparate lives but a panorama of recent social history, rendered in bold, exuberant colors."

Kenneth Turan of the Los Angeles Times called it "a startling film, but not for the obvious reasons. Yes, its decision to focus on the pornography business in the San Fernando Valley in the 1970s and 1980s is nerviness itself, but more impressive is the film's sureness of touch, its ability to be empathetic, nonjudgmental and gently satirical, to understand what is going on beneath the surface of this raunchy Nashville-esque universe and to deftly relate it to our own ... Perhaps the most exciting thing about Boogie Nights is the ease with which writer-director Anderson ... spins out this complex web. A true storyteller, able to easily mix and match moods in a playful and audacious manner, he is a filmmaker definitely worth watching, both now and in the future." In Time Out New York, Andrew Johnston concluded, "The porn milieu may scare some folks off, but Boogie Nights offers laughs, tenderness, terror and redemption--everything you could ask for in a movie. It's an impressive and satisfying film, one the Academy really ought to have the balls to recognize."

Peter Travers of Rolling Stone said, "[T]his chunk of movie dynamite is detonated by Mark Wahlberg ... who grabs a breakout role and runs with it ... Even when Boogie Nights flies off course as it tracks its bizarrely idealistic characters into the '80s ... you can sense the passionate commitment at the core of this hilarious and harrowing spectacle. For this, credit Paul Thomas Anderson ... who ... scores a personal triumph by finding glints of rude life in the ashes that remained after Watergate. For all the unbridled sex, what is significant, timely and, finally, hopeful about Boogie Nights is the way Anderson proves that a movie can be mercilessly honest and mercifully humane at the same time."

Gene Siskel of the Chicago Tribune called it "beautifully made" and praised the performances, calling Reynolds "absolutely centered and in control of his emotions" and saying Wahlberg "couldn't be better". However, he moderated his praise by saying, "The early rave reviews accorded this film suggest a significance that I, however, did not encounter. Show-biz stories are all pretty much the same: ambition, stardom, drugs, disillusionment. Add the home video revolution to this mix and curiosity about the size of the boy wonder's equipment; throw in a few topical references like the soft drink Fresca, and you have the bare bones of the story." He gave the film three and a half stars out of a possible four.

Despite the accolades Wahlberg received for his performance in Boogie Nights, he would later express regret for having made the film. "I've made some poor choices in the past", he said, and stated he wanted God to forgive him for appearing in it. Wahlberg later clarified his comments, saying he had made them because he "was sitting in front of a couple of thousand kids talking about and trying to encourage them to come back to their faith, and I was just saying that I just hope [God] has a sense of humor because I maybe made some decisions that may not be okay with Him." He also stated in an interview with Andy Cohen that his comment was "a joke taken too seriously".

=== Accolades ===
Award	Category	Nominee(s)	Result	Ref.
Academy Awards	Best Supporting Actor	Burt Reynolds	Nominated	
Academy Awards	Best Supporting Actress	Julianne Moore	Nominated	
Academy Awards	Best Screenplay – Written Directly for the Screen	Paul Thomas Anderson	Nominated	
Artios Awards	Outstanding Achievement in Feature Film Casting – Comedy	Christine Sheaks	Won	
Boston Society of Film Critics Awards	Best Supporting Actor	Burt Reynolds	2nd Place	
Boston Society of Film Critics Awards	Best New Filmmaker	Paul Thomas Anderson (also for Hard Eight)	Won	
British Independent Film Awards	Best Foreign Independent Film – English Language		Won	
British Academy Film Awards	Best Actor in a Supporting Role	Burt Reynolds	Nominated	
British Academy Film Awards	Best Original Screenplay	Paul Thomas Anderson	Nominated	
Chicago Film Critics Association Awards	Best Film		Nominated	
Chicago Film Critics Association Awards	Best Director	Paul Thomas Anderson	Nominated	
Chicago Film Critics Association Awards	Best Supporting Actor	Burt Reynolds	Won	
Chicago Film Critics Association Awards	Best Supporting Actress	Julianne Moore	Nominated	
Chlotrudis Awards	Best Supporting Actress	Julianne Moore	Nominated	
Critics' Choice Awards	Best Picture		Nominated	
Dallas–Fort Worth Film Critics Association Awards	Best Picture		Nominated	
Dallas–Fort Worth Film Critics Association Awards	Best Supporting Actor	Burt Reynolds	Won	
European Film Awards	Screen International Award	Paul Thomas Anderson	Nominated	
Florida Film Critics Circle Awards	Best Supporting Actress	Julianne Moore	Won	
Florida Film Critics Circle Awards	Best Cast		Won	
Golden Globe Awards	Best Supporting Actor – Motion Picture	Burt Reynolds	Won	
Golden Globe Awards	Best Supporting Actress – Motion Picture	Julianne Moore	Nominated	
Las Vegas Film Critics Society Awards	Best Supporting Actor	Burt Reynolds	Won	
London Film Critics Circle Awards	Film of the Year		Nominated	
Los Angeles Film Critics Association Awards	Best Supporting Actor	Burt Reynolds	Won	
Los Angeles Film Critics Association Awards	Best Supporting Actress	Julianne Moore	Won	
Los Angeles Film Critics Association Awards	New Generation Award	Paul Thomas Anderson	Won	
MTV Movie Awards	Best Breakthrough Performance	Heather Graham	Won	
MTV Movie Awards	Best Dance Sequence	Mark Wahlberg – "Machine Gun"	Nominated	
National Board of Review Awards	Top Ten Films		7th Place	
National Society of Film Critics Awards	Best Film		3rd Place	
National Society of Film Critics Awards	Best Director	Paul Thomas Anderson	3rd Place	
National Society of Film Critics Awards	Best Supporting Actor	Burt Reynolds	Won	
National Society of Film Critics Awards	Best Supporting Actress	Julianne Moore	Won	
New York Film Critics Circle Awards	Best Supporting Actor	Burt Reynolds	Won	
Online Film & Television Association Awards	Best Drama Picture	Paul Thomas Anderson, Lloyd Levin, John S. Lyons, and JoAnne Sellar	Nominated	
Online Film & Television Association Awards	Best Director	Paul Thomas Anderson	Nominated	
Online Film & Television Association Awards	Best Drama Actress	Julianne Moore	Nominated	
Online Film & Television Association Awards	Best Supporting Actor	Burt Reynolds	Won	
Online Film & Television Association Awards	Best Supporting Actress	Julianne Moore	Won	
Online Film & Television Association Awards	Best Original Screenplay	Paul Thomas Anderson	Nominated	
Online Film & Television Association Awards	Best Costume Design	Mark Bridges	Nominated	
Online Film & Television Association Awards	Best Film Editing	Dylan Tichenor	Nominated	
Online Film & Television Association Awards	Best Production Design	Bob Ziembicki and Sandy Struth	Nominated	
Online Film & Television Association Awards	Best Ensemble		Nominated	
Online Film & Television Association Awards	Hall of Fame – Motion Picture		Inducted	
Online Film Critics Society Awards	Best Director	Paul Thomas Anderson	Nominated	
Online Film Critics Society Awards	Best Supporting Actor	Burt Reynolds	Won	
Online Film Critics Society Awards	Best Screenplay	Paul Thomas Anderson	Nominated	
PEN America Literary Awards	Screenplay	Paul Thomas Anderson	Won	
San Diego Film Critics Society Awards	Best Supporting Actor	Burt Reynolds	Won	
Satellite Awards	Best Motion Picture – Drama		Nominated	
Satellite Awards	Best Director	Paul Thomas Anderson	Nominated	
Satellite Awards	Best Actor in a Motion Picture – Drama	Mark Wahlberg	Nominated	
Satellite Awards	Best Actor in a Supporting Role in a Motion Picture – Drama	Burt Reynolds	Won	
Satellite Awards	Best Actress in a Supporting Role in a Motion Picture – Drama	Julianne Moore	Won	
Satellite Awards	Best Original Screenplay	Paul Thomas Anderson	Nominated	
Satellite Awards	Best Film Editing	Dylan Tichenor	Nominated	
Satellite Awards	Outstanding Motion Picture Ensemble		Won	
Screen Actors Guild Awards	Outstanding Performance by a Cast in a Motion Picture	Don Cheadle, Heather Graham, Luis Guzmán, Philip Baker Hall, Philip Seymour Hoffman, Thomas Jane, Ricky Jay, William H. Macy, Alfred Molina, Julianne Moore, Nicole Ari Parker, John C. Reilly, Burt Reynolds, Robert Ridgely, Mark Wahlberg, and Melora Walters	Nominated	
Screen Actors Guild Awards	Outstanding Performance by a Male Actor in a Supporting Role	Burt Reynolds	Nominated	
Screen Actors Guild Awards	Outstanding Performance by a Female Actor in a Supporting Role	Julianne Moore	Nominated	
Society of Camera Operators	Historical Shot	Andy Shuttleworth	Won	
Society of Texas Film Critics Awards	Best Supporting Actor	Burt Reynolds	Nominated	
Southeastern Film Critics Association Awards	Best Picture		4th Place	
Southeastern Film Critics Association Awards	Best Supporting Actress	Julianne Moore	Nominated	
Stinkers Bad Movie Awards	Worst On-Screen Couple	Mark Wahlberg and his fake 13-inch appendage	Nominated	
Toronto Film Critics Association Awards	Best Director	Paul Thomas Anderson	Runner-up	
Toronto International Film Festival	Metro Media Award	Paul Thomas Anderson	Won (Note: Tied with Curtis Hanson for L.A. Confidential.)	
Turkish Film Critics Association Awards	Best Foreign Film		8th Place	
Writers Guild of America Awards	Best Screenplay – Written Directly for the Screen	Paul Thomas Anderson	Nominated	

== Music ==
Boogie Nights: Music from the Original Motion Picture

Soundtrack album
- Released: October 7, 1997
- Genres: Disco, pop, soul
- Label: Capitol

Boogie Nights 2: More Music from the Original Motion Picture

Soundtrack album
- Released: January 13, 1998
- Genres: Disco, pop, soul
- Label: Capitol

Two Boogie Nights soundtracks were released, the first at the time of the film's initial release and the second the following year. AllMusic rated the first soundtrack four and a half stars out of five and the second soundtrack four.

Boogie Nights [Original Soundtrack] track listing
No.	Title	Writer(s)	Performer(s)	Length
1.	"Intro (Feel the Heat)"	Paul Thomas Anderson, John C. Reilly	Reilly, Mark Wahlberg	1:11
2.	"Best of My Love"	Al McKay, Maurice White	The Emotions	3:39
3.	"Jungle Fever"	Bill Ador	Chakachas	4:20
4.	"Brand New Key"	Melanie Safka	Melanie Safka	2:23
5.	"Spill the Wine"	Eric Burdon and War	Eric Burdon and War	4:02
6.	"Got to Give It Up, Pt. 1"	Marvin Gaye	Marvin Gaye	4:07
7.	"Machine Gun"	Milan Williams	Commodores	2:38
8.	"Magnet and Steel"	Walter Egan	Walter Egan	3:23
9.	"Ain't No Stoppin' Us Now"	Jerry Cohen, Gene McFadden, John Whitehead	McFadden & Whitehead	3:40
10.	"Sister Christian"	Kelly Keagy	Night Ranger	5:00
11.	"Livin' Thing"	Jeff Lynne	Electric Light Orchestra	3:30
12.	"God Only Knows"	Tony Asher, Brian Wilson	The Beach Boys	2:48
13.	"The Big Top (Theme from "Boogie Nights")"		Penn, Patrick Warren	9:58
Total length:				50:39

Boogie Nights, Vol. 2 track listing
No.	Title	Writer(s)	Performer(s)	Length
1.	"Mama Told Me (Not to Come)"	Randy Newman	Three Dog Night	3:16
2.	"Fooled Around and Fell in Love"	Elvin Bishop	Elvin Bishop	4:34
3.	"You Sexy Thing"	Errol Brown, Tony Wilson	Hot Chocolate	4:02
4.	"Boogie Shoes"	Harry Wayne Casey, Richard Finch	KC & the Sunshine Band	2:09
5.	"Do Your Thing"	Charles Wright	Charles Wright & the Watts 103rd Street Rhythm Band	3:29
6.	"Driver's Seat"	Paul Roberts	Sniff 'n' the Tears	4:00
7.	"Feel Too Good"	Roy Wood	The Move	9:30
8.	"Jessie's Girl"	Rick Springfield	Rick Springfield	3:13
9.	"J.P. Walk"	Anton Scott	Sound Experience	7:05
10.	"I Want to Be Free"	Marshall "Rock" Jones, Ralph "Pee Wee" Middlebrooks, James "Diamond" Williams	Ohio Players	6:50
11.	"Joy"	Johann Sebastian Bach	Apollo 100	2:44
Total length:				50:52

Personnel

- Paul Thomas Anderson – executive producer
- Karyn Rachtman – executive producer, music supervisor
- Liz Heller – executive producer
- Bobby Lavelle – music supervisor
- Carol Dunn – music coordinator

=== Songs that appear in the film but not on either soundtrack album ===
- "Data World" by Robert Ascot
- "Sunny" by Boney M.
- "It's Just a Matter of Time" by Brook Benton
- "Craft Service Theme" by J. Brion
- "Susan (The Sage)" by Chico Hamilton Quintet
- "Compared to What" by Roberta Flack
- "Off the Road" by Richard Gilks
- "Lonely Boy" by Andrew Gold
- "Fat Man" by Jethro Tull
- "99 Luftballons" by Nena
- "Queen of Hearts" by Juice Newton
- "Fly, Robin, Fly" by Silver Convention
- "Afternoon Delight" by Starland Vocal Band
- "Voices Carry" by 'Til Tuesday
- "Disco Fever" by Roger Webb
- "Flying Objects" by Roger Webb

== See also ==
- American Eccentric Cinema – Mode of American filmmaking
- List of films featuring fictional films
- Making Venus – A 2002 Australian documentary film about two filmmakers who grapple with having coincidentally made a film similar to Boogie Nights
- Wonderland – 2003 American crime and drama film by James Cox
