= L.A. Confidential (film) =

1997 film by Curtis Hanson

- Theatrical release poster
- Directed by: Curtis Hanson
- Screenplay by: Brian Helgeland; Curtis Hanson
- Based on: L.A. Confidential by James Ellroy
- Produced by: Arnon Milchan; Curtis Hanson; Michael Nathanson
- Starring: Kevin Spacey; Russell Crowe; Guy Pearce; James Cromwell; David Strathairn; Kim Basinger; Danny DeVito
- Cinematography: Dante Spinotti
- Edited by: Peter Honess
- Music by: Jerry Goldsmith
- Production company: Regency Enterprises The Wolper Organization
- Distributed by: Warner Bros.
- Release dates: May 14, 1997 (Cannes); September 19, 1997 (United States)
- Running time: 138 minutes
- Country: United States
- Language: English
- Budget: $35 million
- Box office: $126.2 million

L.A. Confidential is a 1997 American neo-noir crime thriller film directed, produced, and co-written by Curtis Hanson. The screenplay, by Hanson and Brian Helgeland, is based on James Ellroy's 1990 novel, the third book in his L.A. Quartet series. The film tells the story of a group of LAPD officers in 1953, and the intersection of police corruption and Hollywood celebrity. The title refers to the 1950s scandal magazine Confidential, portrayed in the film as Hush-Hush.

At the time, actors Guy Pearce and Russell Crowe were relatively unknown in North America. One of the film's backers, Peter Dennett, was worried about the lack of established stars in the lead roles, but supported Hanson's casting decisions, and Hanson had the confidence to also recruit Kevin Spacey, Kim Basinger, and Danny DeVito.

L.A. Confidential premiered at the Cannes Film Festival on May 14, 1997, and was released by Warner Bros. on September 19, 1997. The film was a critical and commercial success. It grossed $126.2 million against a $35 million budget and received critical acclaim for the acting, writing, directing, editing, and Jerry Goldsmith's musical score. It was nominated for nine Academy Awards, including Best Picture, winning two: Best Supporting Actress (Basinger) and Best Adapted Screenplay; Titanic won in every other category for which L.A. Confidential was nominated. In 2015, the Library of Congress selected L.A. Confidential for preservation in the United States National Film Registry as "culturally, historically, or aesthetically significant".

== Plot ==
In 1953, the Los Angeles Police Department (LAPD) aims to improve its public image following decades of corruption. Career-focused sergeant Edmund Exley lives in the shadow of his legendary detective father, whose murderer was never identified; Exley names the suspect "Rollo Tomasi", representing any criminal who escapes justice. Fame-seeking narcotics sergeant Jack Vincennes collaborates with tabloid journalist Sid Hudgens to perform high-profile celebrity arrests, and volatile officer Wendell White uses violence to interrogate and intimidate suspects, particularly women-abusers, because his father murdered his mother.

On Christmas Eve, White encounters high-class prostitutes Lynn Bracken and Susan Lefferts, and former officer Leland Meeks. They work for Pierce Patchett, a businessman operating a prostitution ring supplying women surgically altered to resemble film stars. White begins a relationship with Bracken. After the "Bloody Christmas" scandal—involving drunken officers beating inmates—Exley is promoted to detective lieutenant for advising his superiors to save the department's reputation by dismissing only securely pensioned officers. Exley coerces Vincennes to testify, while White refuses to comply and is suspended. White's partner, Dick Stensland, is fired for his involvement, making other officers hostile toward Exley. After powerful gangster Mickey Cohen is imprisoned, police captain Dudley Smith recruits White to frighten off criminals attempting to take Cohen's place. A spate of murders targeting Cohen's underlings leads to the disappearance of 25 lb (11 kg) of his heroin.

Exley investigates a massacre at the Nite Owl coffee house, with Stensland and Lefferts among the victims. Three felons are arrested for the crime, and interrogation reveals they have been raping a captive woman. White rushes to free the woman and executes her captor, planting evidence to suggest he acted in self-defense. The felons escape the station and are killed by Exley in the ensuing shootout, closing the case and earning him a medal for bravery. However, unable to ignore inconsistencies in the case, Exley and White continue the investigation independently. White interviews Lefferts's mother and discovers Meeks's body beneath her house. He interrogates Cohen's ex-bodyguard, Johnny Stompanato, who reveals Meeks was trying to sell the stolen heroin.

Hudgens and Vincennes orchestrate a homosexual tryst between struggling actor Matt Reynolds and district attorney Ellis Loew to create blackmail photos. But after Reynolds is found murdered, a guilt-ridden Vincennes joins Exley's investigation. Vincennes learns that Meeks and Stensland formerly worked under Smith, and dropped an investigation into Patchett and Hudgens blackmailing prominent businessmen with photos of their illicit trysts. He then confronts Smith, who shoots him dead. With his last breath, Vincennes says, "Rollo Tomasi."

Exley becomes suspicious when Smith asks him about "Rollo Tomasi", a name Exley disclosed only to Vincennes. Smith arranges for White to find photos that Hudgens took of Bracken having sex with Exley. Enraged, White fights Exley until they realize that their investigations implicate Smith. They deduce that Stensland killed Meeks for the heroin, and Smith orchestrated the Nite Owl massacre to kill Stensland and framed the felons. Exley and White interrogate Loew, discovering that Smith and Patchett are taking over Cohen's empire and blackmailed Loew to force his cooperation. Exley and White later find Hudgens and Patchett murdered.

Smith lures Exley and White into a remote ambush. Though badly wounded, the pair kill Smith's men. Smith offers to mislead the approaching police and further promote Exley, but Exley executes him to prevent him from avoiding punishment. Despite Exley's evidence, LAPD officials decide to protect the department's image by claiming Smith died a hero; Exley agrees to cooperate as a second "hero" for further accolades. Outside city hall, Exley says goodbye to Bracken and White before they leave for Arizona.

== Cast ==
- Kevin Spacey as Detective Sergeant Jack "Hollywood Jack" Vincennes
- Russell Crowe as Officer Wendell "Bud" White
- Guy Pearce as Detective Lieutenant Edmund "Shotgun Ed" Exley
- James Cromwell as Captain Dudley Smith
- Kim Basinger as Lynn Bracken
- Danny DeVito as Sid Hudgens
- David Strathairn as Pierce Morehouse Patchett
- Ron Rifkin as District Attorney Ellis Loew
- Graham Beckel as Detective Sergeant Richard "Dick Stens" Stensland
- Amber Smith as Susan Lefferts
- John Mahon as Police Chief
- Paul Guilfoyle as Meyer "Mickey" Cohen
- Matt McCoy as Brett Chase
- Paolo Seganti as Johnny Stompanato
- Simon Baker as Matt Reynolds
- Tomas Arana as Detective Sergeant Michael Breuning
- Michael McCleery as Detective Sergeant William Carlisle
- Shawnee Free Jones as Tammy Jordan
- Darrell Sandeen as Leland "Buzz" Meeks
- Marisol Padilla Sánchez as Inez Soto
- Gwenda Deacon as Mrs. Lefferts
- Jim Metzler as Councilman
- Brenda Bakke as Lana Turner

== Production ==
=== Development ===
Curtis Hanson had read half a dozen of James Ellroy's books before L.A. Confidential and was drawn to its characters, not the plot. He said, "What hooked me on them was that, as I met them, one after the other, I didn't like them—but as I continued reading, I started to care about them." Ellroy's novel also made Hanson think about Los Angeles and provided him with an opportunity to "set a movie at a point in time when the whole dream of Los Angeles, from that apparently golden era of the '20s and '30s, was being bulldozed."

Screenwriter Brian Helgeland was originally signed to Warner Bros. to write a Viking film with director Uli Edel and then worked on an unproduced modern-day King Arthur story. Helgeland was a longtime fan of Ellroy's novels. When he heard that Warner Bros. had acquired the rights to L.A. Confidential in 1990, he lobbied to script the film, but the studio was then talking only to well-known screenwriters. When he finally got a meeting, it was canceled two days before it was to occur.

Helgeland found that Hanson had been hired to direct and met with him while the filmmaker was making The River Wild. They found that they not only shared a love for Ellroy's fiction but also agreed on how to adapt Confidential into a film. According to Helgeland, they had to "remove every scene from the book that didn't have the three main cops in it, and then to work from those scenes out." According to Hanson, he "wanted the audience to be challenged but at the same time I didn't want them to get lost." They worked on the script together for two years, with Hanson turning down jobs and Helgeland writing seven drafts for free.

The two men also got Ellroy's approval. He had seen Hanson's films The Bedroom Window and Bad Influence, and found him "a competent and interesting storyteller", but was not convinced that his book would be made into a film until he talked to the eventual director. He later said, "They preserved the basic integrity of the book and its main theme. Brian and Curtis took a work of fiction that had eight plotlines, reduced those to three, and retained the dramatic force of three men working out their destiny."

Warner Bros. executive Bill Gerber showed the script to Michael Nathanson, CEO of New Regency Productions, which had a deal with the studio. Nathanson loved it, but they had to get the approval of New Regency's owner, Arnon Milchan. Hanson prepared a presentation that consisted of 15 vintage postcards and pictures of Los Angeles mounted on posterboards, and made his pitch to Milchan. The pictures consisted of orange groves, beaches, tract homes in the San Fernando Valley, and the opening of the Hollywood Freeway to symbolize the image of prosperity sold to the public.

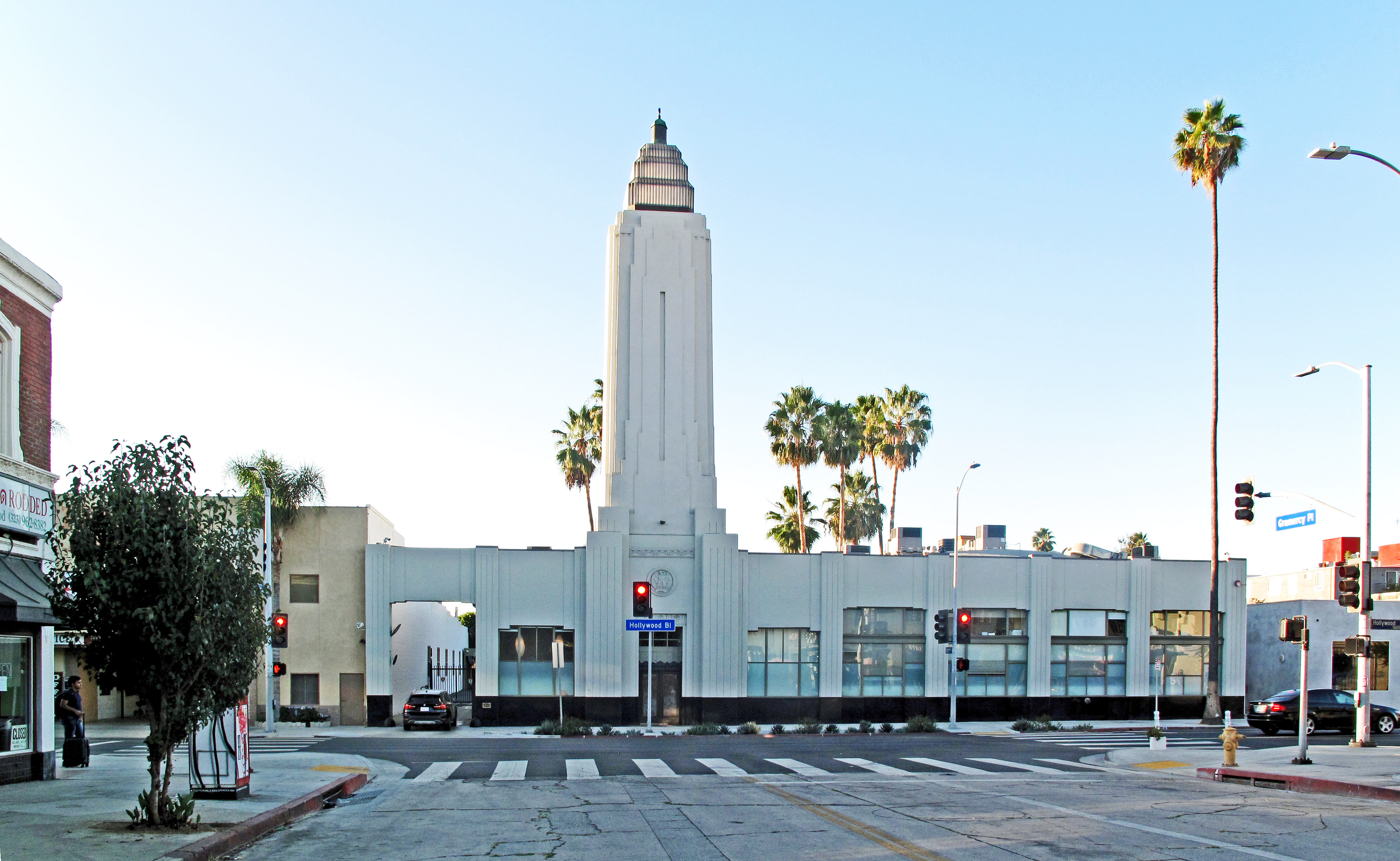
Building used for movie premiere scene in L.A. Confidential

In the pitch, Hanson showed the darker side of Ellroy's novel by presenting the cover of scandal rag Confidential and the famous shot of Robert Mitchum coming out of jail after his marijuana bust. He also had photographs of jazz musicians Zoot Sims, Gerry Mulligan, and Chet Baker to represent the popular music of the time. Hanson emphasized that the period detail would be in the background and the characters in the foreground. Milchan was impressed with his presentation and agreed to finance it.

=== Casting ===
Hanson had seen Russell Crowe in Romper Stomper and found him "repulsive and scary, but captivating". The actor had read Ellroy's The Black Dahlia but not L.A. Confidential. When he read the script, Crowe was drawn to Bud White's "self-righteous moral crusade". Crowe fit the visual preconception of Bud. Hanson put the actor on tape doing a few scenes from the script and showed it to the film's producers, who agreed to cast him as Bud.

Guy Pearce auditioned, and Hanson felt that he "was very much what I had in mind for Ed Exley." The director purposely did not watch the actor in The Adventures of Priscilla, Queen of the Desert, afraid that it might influence his decision. As he did with Crowe, Hanson taped Pearce and showed it to the producers, who agreed he should be cast as Ed. Pearce did not like Ed when he first read the screenplay and remarked, "I was pretty quick to judge him and dislike him for being so self-righteous ... But I liked how honest he became about himself. I knew I could grow to respect and understand him."

Milchan was against casting "two Australians" in the American period piece (Pearce wryly noted in a later interview that while he and Crowe grew up in Australia, he was born in England to a New Zealand father, while the Māori Crowe is a New Zealander too). Crowe and Pearce were also relative unknowns in North America, and Milchan was equally worried about the lack of film stars in the lead roles. But he supported Hanson's casting decisions and this gave the director the confidence to approach Kim Basinger, Danny DeVito and Kevin Spacey. Hanson cast Crowe and Pearce because he wanted to "replicate my experience of the book. You don't like any of these characters at first, but the deeper you get into their story, the more you begin to sympathize with them. I didn't want actors audiences knew and already liked."

A third Australian actor unknown to American audiences at the time, Simon Baker, later to star in the television series The Mentalist, was cast in the smaller but noteworthy role of Matt Reynolds, a doomed young bisexual actor. He was billed as Simon Baker Denny in the film's credits.

Hanson felt that the character of Jack Vincennes was "a movie star among cops", and thought of Spacey, with his "movie-star charisma," casting him specifically against type. Hanson was confident that Spacey "could play the man behind that veneer, the man who also lost his soul," and when he gave him the script, he told him to think of Dean Martin while in the role. Hanson cast Basinger because he felt that she "was the character to me. What beauty today could project the glamour of Hollywood's golden age?"

=== Pre-production ===
To give his cast and crew points and counterpoints to capture Los Angeles in the 1950s, Hanson held a "mini-film festival", showing one film a week: The Bad and the Beautiful, because it epitomized the glamorous Hollywood look; In a Lonely Place, because it revealed the ugly underbelly of Hollywood glamour; Don Siegel's The Lineup and Private Hell 36, "for their lean and efficient style"; and Kiss Me Deadly, because it was "so rooted in the futuristic '50s: the atomic age." Hanson and the film's cinematographer Dante Spinotti studied Robert Frank's 1958 photographic book The Americans and felt that the influence of his work was in every aspect of the film's visuals. Spinotti wanted to compose the shots of the film as if he was using a still camera and suggested Hanson shoot the film in the Super 35 widescreen format with spherical lenses, which in Spinotti's opinion conveyed the feel of a still photo.

Before filming took place, Hanson brought Crowe and Pearce to Los Angeles for two months to immerse them in the city and the time period. He also got them dialect coaches, showed them vintage police training films, and introduced them to cops. Pearce found the contemporary police force had changed too much to be useful for research and disliked the police officer he rode along with because Pearce felt he was racist. He found the police films more valuable because "there was a real sort of stiffness, a woodenness about these people" that he felt Exley had as well. For six weeks, Crowe, Pearce, Hanson and Helgeland conducted rehearsals in which they discussed each scene in the script. As other actors were cast, they joined the rehearsals.

=== Principal photography ===
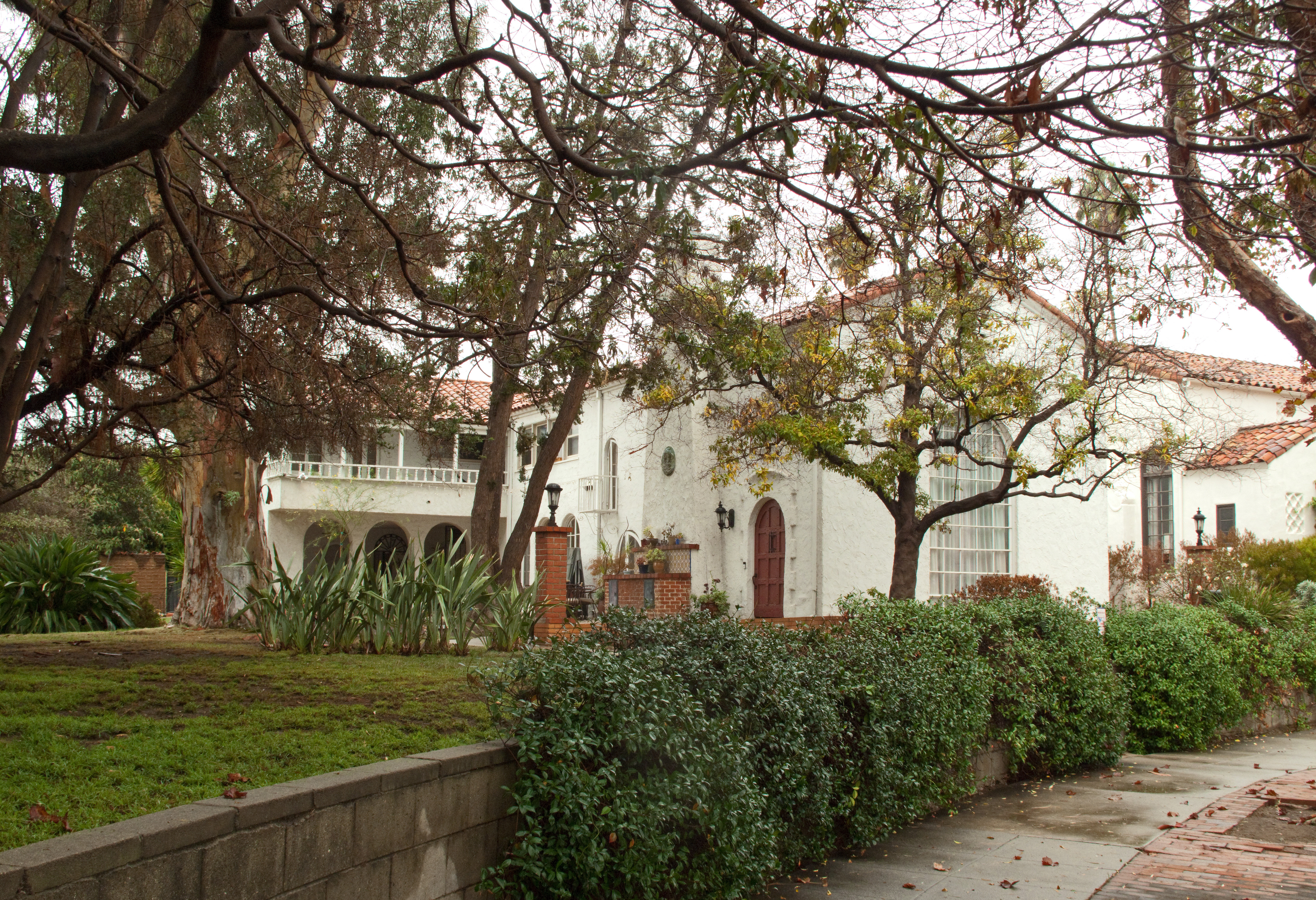
Lynn Bracken's house. 501 Wilcox Ave., Los Angeles

Hanson did not want the film to be an exercise in nostalgia, and so had Spinotti shoot it like a contemporary film and used more naturalistic lighting than in a classic film noir. He told Spinotti and the film's production designer, Jeannine Oppewall, to pay close attention to period detail, but to then "put it all in the background". L.A. Confidential was shot at the Linda Vista Community Hospital in the Los Angeles area. Several Hollywood landmarks appropriate to the 1950s were used, including the Formosa Cafe in West Hollywood, the Frolic Room on Hollywood Boulevard, and the Crossroads of the World, an outdoor shopping mall dressed as a movie theatre where the premiere of When Worlds Collide takes place at the beginning of the film.

Patchett's home is the Lovell House, a famous International Style mansion designed by Richard Neutra. Bracken's house is at 501 Wilcox Avenue in the affluent Hancock Park neighborhood, overlooking the Wilshire Country Club. The house required a $75,000 renovation to transform it into the Spanish-style home described in the script. Historic Central Los Angeles neighborhoods were used for the scenes in which the police hunt down the Nite Owl suspects, including Angelino Heights, Lincoln Heights, and Koreatown. The Victory Motel was one of the few purpose-built sets, constructed on a flat stretch of the Inglewood Oil Field in Culver City.

=== Music ===
Jerry Goldsmith's score for the film was nominated for the Academy Award for Best Original Dramatic Score, but lost to James Horner's score for Titanic.

== Reception ==
The film was screened at the 1997 Cannes Film Festival. According to Hanson, Warner Bros. did not want it shown at Cannes because they felt there was an "anti-studio bias ... So why go and come home a loser?" But Hanson wanted to debut the film at a high-profile international venue. He and other producers bypassed the studio and sent a print directly to the festival's selection committee, which loved it. Ellroy saw the film and said, "I understood in 40 minutes or so that it is a work of art on its own level. It was amazing to see the physical incarnation of the characters."

=== Box office ===
L.A. Confidential grossed $64.6 million in the United States, and $61.6 million in other territories, for a worldwide total of $126.2 million.

The film was released on September 19, 1997, in 769 theaters, grossing $5.2 million in its opening weekend and finishing fourth, behind In & Out, The Game, and Wishmaster. It made $4.4 million in its second weekend then expanded to 1,625 theaters and grossed $4.7 million in its third.

=== Critical response ===
On review aggregator website Rotten Tomatoes, L.A. Confidential holds an approval rating of 99% and an average rating of 9/10, with 162 out of 163 reviews being positive. The site's critical consensus reads: "Taut pacing, brilliantly dense writing and Oscar-worthy acting combine to produce a smart, popcorn-friendly thrill ride." The film later appeared third on the site's list of the "300 Best Movies of All Time", a synthesis of critic and user reviews. On Metacritic the film has a weighted average score of 90 out of 100, based on 28 critics, indicating "universal acclaim". Audiences polled by CinemaScore gave the film an average grade of "A−" on an A+ to F scale.

Film critic Roger Ebert gave the film four out of four stars and called it "seductive and beautiful, cynical and twisted, and one of the best films of the year." He later included it as one of his "Great Movies" and described it as "film noir, and so it is, but it is more: Unusually for a crime film, it deals with the psychology of the characters ... It contains all the elements of police action, but in a sharply clipped, more economical style; the action exists not for itself but to provide an arena for the personalities".

In her review for The New York Times, Janet Maslin wrote, "Mr. Spacey is at his insinuating best, languid and debonair, in a much more offbeat performance than this film could have drawn from a more conventional star. And the two Australian actors, tightly wound Mr. Pearce and fiery, brawny Mr. Crowe, qualify as revelations." Desson Howe's review for The Washington Post praised the cast: "Pearce makes a wonderful prude who gets progressively tougher and more jaded. New Zealand-born Crowe has a unique and sexy toughness; imagine Mickey Rourke without the attitude. Although she's playing a stock character, Basinger exudes a sort of chaste sultriness. Spacey is always enjoyable."

In his review for The Globe and Mail, Liam Lacey wrote, "The big star is Los Angeles itself. Like Roman Polanski's depiction of Los Angeles in the '30s in Chinatown, the atmosphere and detailed production design are a rich gel where the strands of narrative form." USA Today gave the film three and a half stars out of four, writing, "It appears as if screenwriters Brian Helgeland and Curtis Hanson have pulled off a miracle in keeping multiple stories straight. Have they ever. Ellroy's novel has four extra layers of plot and three times as many characters ... the writers have trimmed unwieldy muscle, not just fat, and gotten away with it."

In his review for Newsweek, David Ansen wrote, "L.A. Confidential asks the audience to raise its level a bit, too—you actually have to pay attention to follow the double-crossing intricacies of the plot. The reward for your work is dark and dirty fun." Richard Schickel, in his review for Time, wrote, "It's a movie of shadows and half lights, the best approximation of the old black-and-white noir look anyone has yet managed on color stock. But it's no idle exercise in style. The film's look suggests how deep the tradition of police corruption runs." Writing in Time Out New York, Andrew Johnston observed: "Large chunks of Ellroy's brilliant (and often hilarious) dialogue are preserved, and the actors clearly relish the meaty lines. Dante Spinotti's lush cinematography and Jeanne Oppewall's crisp, meticulous production design produce an eye-popping tableau of '50s glamour and sleaze."

In his review for The New York Observer, Andrew Sarris wrote, "Mr. Crowe strikes the deepest registers with the tortured character of Bud White, a part that has had less cut out of it from the book than either Mr. Spacey's or Mr. Pearce's ... but Mr. Crowe at moments reminded me of James Cagney's poignant performance in Charles Vidor's Love Me or Leave Me (1955), and I can think of no higher praise." Kenneth Turan, in his review for Los Angeles Times, wrote, "The only potential audience drawback L.A. Confidential has is its reliance on unsettling bursts of violence, both bloody shootings and intense physical beatings that give the picture a palpable air of menace. Overriding that, finally, is the film's complete command of its material." In his review for The Independent, Ryan Gilbey wrote, "In fact, it's a very well made and intelligent picture, assembled with an attention to detail, both in plot and characterisation, that you might have feared was all but extinct in mainstream American cinema." Richard Williams, in his review for The Guardian, wrote, "L.A. Confidential gets just about everything right. The light, the architecture, the slang, the music ... a wonderful Lana Turner joke. A sense, above all, of damaged people arriving to make new lives and getting seduced by the scent of night-blooming jasmine, the perfume of corruption."

Some authors have described L.A. Confidential as a neo-noir film.

=== Accolades ===
TIME magazine ranked L.A. Confidential the best film of 1997. The National Society of Film Critics also ranked it the year's best film and Curtis Hanson was voted Best Director. The New York Film Critics Circle also voted L.A. Confidential the year's best film in addition to ranking Hanson best director, and his and Brian Helgeland's best screenplay. The Los Angeles Film Critics Association and the National Board of Review also voted L.A. Confidential the year's best film. As a result, it is one of four films in history to sweep the "Big Four" critics' awards, alongside Schindler's List (1993), The Social Network (2010), and One Battle After Another (2025).

In 2006, Writers Guild of America West ranked its screenplay 60th in WGA's list of 101 Greatest Screenplays. In 2008, it was also voted the best film set in Los Angeles in the last 25 years by a group of Los Angeles Times writers and editors with two criteria: "The movie had to communicate some inherent truth about the L.A. experience, and only one film per director was allowed on the list." In 2009, the London Film Critics' Circle voted L.A. Confidential one of the best films of the past 30 years. The February 2020 issue of New York Magazine lists L.A. Confidential as among "The Best Movies That Lost Best Picture at the Oscars."

Award	Category	Nominee(s)	Result	Ref.
Academy Awards	Best Picture	Arnon Milchan, Curtis Hanson, and Michael Nathanson	Nominated	
Academy Awards	Best Director	Curtis Hanson	Nominated	
Academy Awards	Best Supporting Actress	Kim Basinger	Won	
Academy Awards	Best Screenplay – Based on Material Previously Produced or Published	Brian Helgeland and Curtis Hanson	Won	
Academy Awards	Best Art Direction	Art Direction: Jeannine Oppewall; Set Decoration: Jay Hart	Nominated	
Academy Awards	Best Cinematography	Dante Spinotti	Nominated	
Academy Awards	Best Film Editing	Peter Honess	Nominated	
Academy Awards	Best Original Dramatic Score	Jerry Goldsmith	Nominated	
Academy Awards	Best Sound	Andy Nelson, Anna Behlmer, and Kirk Francis	Nominated	
American Cinema Editors Awards	Best Edited Feature Film	Peter Honess	Nominated	
American Society of Cinematographers Awards	Outstanding Achievement in Cinematography in Theatrical Releases	Dante Spinotti	Nominated	
Argentine Film Critics Association Awards	Best Foreign Film	Curtis Hanson	Nominated	
Art Directors Guild Awards	Excellence in Production Design – Feature Film	Jeannine Oppewall and Bill Arnold	Nominated	
Artios Awards	Outstanding Achievement in Feature Film Casting – Drama	Mali Finn	Won	
Australian Film Institute Awards	Best Foreign Film	Arnon Milchan, Curtis Hanson, and Michael Nathanson	Won	
Blue Ribbon Awards	Best Foreign Film	Curtis Hanson	Won	
BMI Film & TV Awards	BMI Film Music Award	Jerry Goldsmith (Also for Air Force One)	Won	
Bodil Awards	Best Non-European Film	Curtis Hanson	Won	
Boston Society of Film Critics Awards	Best Film	John Seale	Won	
Boston Society of Film Critics Awards	Best Director	Curtis Hanson	Won	
Boston Society of Film Critics Awards	Best Supporting Actor	Kevin Spacey	Won	
Boston Society of Film Critics Awards	Best Screenplay	Brian Helgeland and Curtis Hanson	Won	
British Academy Film Awards	Best Film	Arnon Milchan, Curtis Hanson, and Michael Nathanson	Nominated	
British Academy Film Awards	Best Direction	Curtis Hanson	Nominated	
British Academy Film Awards	Best Actor in a Leading Role	Kevin Spacey	Nominated	
British Academy Film Awards	Best Actress in a Leading Role	Kim Basinger	Nominated	
British Academy Film Awards	Best Screenplay – Adapted	Brian Helgeland and Curtis Hanson	Nominated	
British Academy Film Awards	Best Cinematography	Dante Spinotti	Nominated	
British Academy Film Awards	Best Costume Design	Ruth Myers	Nominated	
British Academy Film Awards	Best Editing	Peter Honess	Won	
British Academy Film Awards	Best Make Up/Hair	John M. Elliott, Scott H. Eddo, and Janis Clark	Nominated	
British Academy Film Awards	Best Original Music	Jerry Goldsmith	Nominated	
British Academy Film Awards	Best Production Design	Jeannine Oppewall	Nominated	
British Academy Film Awards	Best Sound	Terry Rodman, Roland N. Thai, Kirk Francis, Andy Nelson, Anna Behlmer, and John Leveque	Won	
British Society of Cinematographers Awards	Best Cinematography in a Theatrical Feature Film	Dante Spinotti	Won	
Cannes Film Festival	Palme d'Or	Curtis Hanson	Nominated	
Chicago Film Critics Association Awards	Best Film		Won	
Chicago Film Critics Association Awards	Best Director	Curtis Hanson	Won	
Chicago Film Critics Association Awards	Best Supporting Actor	Kevin Spacey	Nominated	
Chicago Film Critics Association Awards	Best Screenplay	Brian Helgeland and Curtis Hanson	Won	
Chicago Film Critics Association Awards	Best Cinematography	Dante Spinotti	Nominated	
Chicago Film Critics Association Awards	Best Original Score	Jerry Goldsmith	Nominated	
Chicago Film Critics Association Awards	Most Promising Actor	Guy Pearce	Nominated	
Chlotrudis Awards	Best Movie		Won	
Chlotrudis Awards	Best Director	Curtis Hanson	Won	
Chlotrudis Awards	Best Actor	Russell Crowe	Won	
Chlotrudis Awards	Best Actor	Guy Pearce	Nominated	
Chlotrudis Awards	Best Supporting Actor	Kevin Spacey	Won	
Chlotrudis Awards	Best Screenplay	Brian Helgeland and Curtis Hanson	Won	
Chlotrudis Awards	Best Cinematography	Dante Spinotti	Won	
Cinema Audio Society Awards	Outstanding Achievement in Sound Mixing for Motion Pictures	Andy Nelson, Anna Behlmer, and Kirk Francis	Nominated	
Cinema Writers Circle Awards	Best Foreign Film		Won	
Critics' Choice Awards	Best Picture		Won	
Critics' Choice Awards	Best Screenplay – Adapted	Brian Helgeland and Curtis Hanson	Won	
Dallas–Fort Worth Film Critics Association Awards	Best Picture		Won	
Dallas–Fort Worth Film Critics Association Awards	Best Director	Curtis Hanson	Nominated	
Dallas–Fort Worth Film Critics Association Awards	Best Supporting Actress	Kim Basinger	Won	
Directors Guild of America Awards	Outstanding Directorial Achievement in Motion Pictures	Curtis Hanson	Nominated	
Edgar Allan Poe Awards	Best Motion Picture	Brian Helgeland and Curtis Hanson	Won	
Empire Awards	Best Actor	Kevin Spacey	Won	
Film Critics Circle of Australia Awards	Best Foreign Film		Won	
Florida Film Critics Circle Awards	Best Director	Curtis Hanson	Won	
Florida Film Critics Circle Awards	Best Screenplay	Brian Helgeland and Curtis Hanson	Won	
Florida Film Critics Circle Awards	Best Cinematography	Dante Spinotti	Won	
Fotogramas de Plata	Best Foreign Film	Curtis Hanson	Won	
Golden Globe Awards	Best Motion Picture – Drama		Nominated	
Golden Globe Awards	Best Supporting Actress – Motion Picture	Kim Basinger	Won	
Golden Globe Awards	Best Director – Motion Picture	Curtis Hanson	Nominated	
Golden Globe Awards	Best Screenplay – Motion Picture	Brian Helgeland and Curtis Hanson	Nominated	
Golden Globe Awards	Best Original Score – Motion Picture	Jerry Goldsmith	Nominated	
Golden Reel Awards	Best Sound Editing – Dialogue & ADR	Becky Sullivan, Robert Ulrich, Mildred Iatrou, Catherine M. Speakman, Donald L. Warner Jr., Andrea Horta, Denise Horta, Diane Linn, and Tami Treadwell	Nominated	
Golden Reel Awards	Best Sound Editing – Music (Foreign & Domestic)	Kenneth Hall	Nominated	
Golden Reel Awards	Best Sound Editing – Sound Effects & Foley		Nominated	
Japan Academy Film Prize	Outstanding Foreign Language Film		Won	
Kinema Junpo Awards	Best Foreign Language Film	Curtis Hanson	Won	
Kinema Junpo Awards	Best Foreign Language Film (Readers' Choice Award)	Curtis Hanson	Won	
Kinema Junpo Awards	Best Foreign Language Film Director	Curtis Hanson	Won	
Las Vegas Film Critics Society Awards	Best Screenplay	Brian Helgeland and Curtis Hanson	Won	
London Film Critics Circle Awards	Film of the Year		Won	
London Film Critics Circle Awards	Director of the Year	Curtis Hanson	Won	
London Film Critics Circle Awards	Screenwriter of the Year	Brian Helgeland and Curtis Hanson	Won	
Los Angeles Film Critics Association Awards	Best Picture		Won	
Los Angeles Film Critics Association Awards	Best Director	Curtis Hanson	Won	
Los Angeles Film Critics Association Awards	Best Supporting Actor	Kevin Spacey	Runner-up	
Los Angeles Film Critics Association Awards	Best Screenplay	Brian Helgeland and Curtis Hanson	Won	
Los Angeles Film Critics Association Awards	Best Cinematography	Dante Spinotti	Won	
Los Angeles Film Critics Association Awards	Best Production Design	Jeannine Oppewall	Runner-up	
Mainichi Film Awards	Best Foreign Language Film	Curtis Hanson	Won	
Nastro d'Argento	Best Foreign Director	Curtis Hanson	Nominated	
Nastro d'Argento	Best Cinematography	Dante Spinotti	Nominated	
National Board of Review Awards	Top Ten Films		Won	
National Board of Review Awards	Best Film		Won	
National Board of Review Awards	Best Director	Curtis Hanson	Won	
National Film Preservation Board	National Film Registry		Inducted	
National Society of Film Critics Awards	Best Film		Won	
National Society of Film Critics Awards	Best Director	Curtis Hanson	Won	
National Society of Film Critics Awards	Best Supporting Actor	Kevin Spacey	2nd Place	
National Society of Film Critics Awards	Best Screenplay	Brian Helgeland and Curtis Hanson	Won	
National Society of Film Critics Awards	Best Cinematography	Dante Spinotti	2nd Place	
New York Film Critics Circle Awards	Best Film		Won	
New York Film Critics Circle Awards	Best Director	Curtis Hanson	Won	
New York Film Critics Circle Awards	Best Screenplay	Brian Helgeland and Curtis Hanson	Won	
Nikkan Sports Film Awards	Best Foreign Film		Won	
Online Film & Television Association Awards	Best Picture	Arnon Milchan, Curtis Hanson, and Michael Nathanson	Nominated	
Online Film & Television Association Awards	Best Drama Picture	Arnon Milchan, Curtis Hanson, and Michael Nathanson	Nominated	
Online Film & Television Association Awards	Best Director	Curtis Hanson	Nominated	
Online Film & Television Association Awards	Best Supporting Actress	Kim Basinger	Nominated	
Online Film & Television Association Awards	Best Adapted Screenplay	Brian Helgeland and Curtis Hanson	Won	
Online Film & Television Association Awards	Best Cinematography	Dante Spinotti	Nominated	
Online Film & Television Association Awards	Best Costume Design	Ruth Myers	Nominated	
Online Film & Television Association Awards	Best Film Editing	Peter Honess	Nominated	
Online Film & Television Association Awards	Best Production Design	Jeannine Oppewall and Jay Hart	Nominated	
Online Film & Television Association Awards	Best Drama Score	Jerry Goldsmith	Nominated	
Online Film & Television Association Awards	Best Ensemble		Won	
Online Film & Television Association Awards	Best Sound		Nominated	
Online Film & Television Association Awards	Best Titles Sequence		Nominated	
Online Film & Television Association Awards	Hall of Fame – Motion Picture		Inducted	
Online Film Critics Society Awards	Best Picture		Won	
Online Film Critics Society Awards	Best Director	Curtis Hanson	Nominated	
Online Film Critics Society Awards	Best Screenplay	Brian Helgeland and Curtis Hanson	Won	
Producers Guild of America Awards	Outstanding Producer of Theatrical Motion Pictures	Arnon Milchan, Curtis Hanson, and Michael Nathanson	Nominated	
Political Film Society Awards	Human Rights		Nominated	
San Diego Film Critics Society Awards	Best Picture		Won	
San Diego Film Critics Society Awards	Best Director	Curtis Hanson	Nominated	
San Diego Film Critics Society Awards	Best Screenplay – Adapted	Brian Helgeland and Curtis Hanson	Won	
Sant Jordi Awards	Best Foreign Film	Curtis Hanson	Won	
Sant Jordi Awards	Best Foreign Film (Audience Award)	Curtis Hanson	Won	
Satellite Awards	Best Motion Picture – Drama		Nominated	
Satellite Awards	Best Director	Curtis Hanson	Nominated	
Satellite Awards	Best Actor in a Motion Picture – Drama	Russell Crowe	Nominated	
Satellite Awards	Best Screenplay – Adapted	Brian Helgeland and Curtis Hanson	Won	
Satellite Awards	Best Art Direction	Jeannine Oppewall	Nominated	
Satellite Awards	Best Cinematography	Dante Spinotti	Nominated	
Satellite Awards	Best Film Editing	Peter Honess	Nominated	
Satellite Awards	Best Original Score	Jerry Goldsmith	Nominated	
Saturn Awards (1998)	Best Action/Adventure/Thriller Film		Won	
Saturn Awards (2009)	Best DVD Special Edition Release		Nominated	
Screen Actors Guild Awards	Outstanding Performance by a Cast in a Motion Picture	Kim Basinger, James Cromwell, Russell Crowe, Danny DeVito, Guy Pearce, Kevin Spacey, and David Strathairn	Nominated	
Screen Actors Guild Awards	Outstanding Performance by a Female Actor in a Supporting Role	Kim Basinger	Won (Note: Tied with Gloria Stuart for Titanic.)	
Society of Texas Film Critics Awards	Best Supporting Actor	Kevin Spacey (Also for Midnight in the Garden of Good and Evil)	Won	
Society of Texas Film Critics Awards	Best Supporting Actress	Kim Basinger	Nominated	
Society of Texas Film Critics Awards	Best Screenplay – Adapted	Brian Helgeland and Curtis Hanson	Won	
Southeastern Film Critics Association Awards	Best Picture		Won	
Southeastern Film Critics Association Awards	Best Director	Curtis Hanson	Won	
Southeastern Film Critics Association Awards	Best Supporting Actress	Kim Basinger	Won	
Southeastern Film Critics Association Awards	Best Adapted Screenplay	Brian Helgeland and Curtis Hanson	Won	
Toronto Film Critics Association Awards	Best Film		Runner-up	
Toronto Film Critics Association Awards	Best Director	Curtis Hanson	Runner-up	
Toronto International Film Festival	Metro Media Award	Curtis Hanson	Won (Note: Tied with Paul Thomas Anderson for Boogie Nights.)	
Turkish Film Critics Association Awards	Best Foreign Film		2nd Place	
USC Scripter Awards		Brian Helgeland and Curtis Hanson (screenwriters); James Ellroy (author)	Won	
Writers Guild of America Awards	Best Screenplay – Based on Material Previously Produced or Published	Brian Helgeland and Curtis Hanson	Won	

== Home media ==
A VHS and DVD were released on April 14, 1998, by Warner Home Video. In addition to the film, the latter release included two featurettes, an interactive map of Los Angeles, a music-only track, a theatrical trailer, and three TV spots.

The movie was released again as a two-disc Special Edition DVD and Blu-ray on September 23, 2008. Both sets have the same bonus content. In addition to the features from the original DVD, there are four new featurettes, the 1999 pilot of the proposed television series starring Kiefer Sutherland, and film commentary by writer (novel) James Ellroy, writer (screenplay)/co-producer Brian Helgeland, actors Kevin Spacey, Russell Crowe, Guy Pearce, James Cromwell, Kim Basinger, Danny DeVito and David Strathairn, production designer Jeannine Oppewall, director of photography Dante Spinotti, costume designer Ruth Myers and American film critic Andrew Sarris. Some sets included a six-song sampler from the film's soundtrack.

On September 26, 2017, 20th Century Fox Home Entertainment, the distributor and part-owner of New Regency, re-released the film on Blu-ray as part of its 20th anniversary with new cover artwork. The disc has the same technical specifications and bonus features as the previous Blu-ray.

== Proposed sequel ==
In October 2020, Brian Helgeland confirmed a sequel to L.A. Confidential had been in development before the death of Chadwick Boseman, who would have played a young cop working for L.A. Mayor Tom Bradley named James Muncie. Crowe and Pearce would have reprised their roles, and the film was to have been set in 1974.

The planned sequel failed to attract interest from studios, with Ellroy and Helgeland revealing that executives from Netflix fell asleep during their pitch.
