= Dallas–Fort Worth Film Critics Association Awards 1997 =

1997 award cemony in Dallas, TX

3rd Dallas-Fort Worth Film Critics Association Awards
- Date: January 1998
- Location: Dallas, Texas
- Country: United States
- Presented by: Dallas-Fort Worth Film Critics Association
- Website: dfwfilmcritics.net

The 3rd Dallas-Fort Worth Film Critics Association Awards, given in January 1998, honored the best filmmaking of 1997.

L.A. Confidential by director Curtis Hanson won the award for Best Picture. Titanic earned the award for Best Director (James Cameron). The Wings of the Dove won the two female acting awards (Leading Role: Helena Bonham Carter and Supporting Role: Alison Elliott).

== Winners ==
- Best Actor:
  - Peter Fonda - Ulee's Gold
- Best Actress:
  - Helena Bonham Carter - The Wings of the Dove
- Best Director:
  - James Cameron - Titanic
- Best Picture:
  - L.A. Confidential
- Best Supporting Actor:
  - Burt Reynolds - Boogie Nights
- Best Supporting Actress:
  - Alison Elliott - The Wings of the Dove
