= Boston Society of Film Critics Awards 1997 =

Film award ceremony

18th BSFC Awards

December 14, 1997

Best Film:
L.A. Confidential

The 18th Boston Society of Film Critics Awards honored the best films of 1997. The awards were given on 14 December 1997.

== Winners ==
=== Best Film ===
1. L.A. Confidential
2. The Sweet Hereafter
3. Donnie Brasco

=== Best Actor ===
- Al Pacino – Donnie Brasco

=== Best Actress ===
1. Helena Bonham Carter – The Wings of the Dove
2. Katrin Cartlidge – Career Girls
3. Tilda Swinton – Female Perversions

=== Best Supporting Actor ===
1. Kevin Spacey – L.A. Confidential
2. Burt Reynolds – Boogie Nights
3. Robert Downey Jr. – One Night Stand

=== Best Supporting Actress ===
1. Sarah Polley – The Sweet Hereafter
2. Joan Cusack – In & Out
3. Alison Elliott – The Wings of the Dove

=== Best Director ===
1. Curtis Hanson – L.A. Confidential
2. Atom Egoyan – The Sweet Hereafter
3. Mike Newell – Donnie Brasco

=== Best Screenplay ===
1. Curtis Hanson and Brian Helgeland – L.A. Confidential
2. Kevin Smith – Chasing Amy
3. Matt Damon and Ben Affleck – Good Will Hunting

=== Best Cinematography ===
1. Roger Deakins – Kundun
2. Eduardo Serra – The Wings of the Dove
3. Paul Sarossy – The Sweet Hereafter

=== Best Documentary ===
1. Fast, Cheap & Out of Control
2. Sick: The Life & Death of Bob Flanagan, Supermasochist
3. Message to Love: The Isle of Wight Festival

=== Best Foreign-Language Film ===
1. Underground • France/Federal Republic of Yugoslavia/Germany/Bulgaria/Hungary
2. Shall We Dance? (Shall we dansu?) • Japan
3. Irma Vep • France

=== Best New Filmmaker ===
- Paul Thomas Anderson – Hard Eight and Boogie Nights
