= London Film Critics Circle Awards 1998 =

British film awards ceremony

19th London Film Critics Circle Awards

4 March 1999

Film of the Year:
Saving Private Ryan

British Film of the Year:
Lock, Stock and Two Smoking Barrels

The 19th London Film Critics Circle Awards, honouring the best in film for 1998, were announced by the London Film Critics Circle on 4 March 1999.

== Winners and nominees ==
=== Film of the Year ===
Saving Private Ryan

- Boogie Nights
- The Ice Storm
- Titanic
- The Truman Show

=== British Film of the Year ===
Lock, Stock and Two Smoking Barrels

- The Butcher Boy
- Elizabeth
- The General
- My Name Is Joe

=== Foreign Language Film of the Year ===
Shall We Dance? • Japan

- Funny Games • Austria

=== Director of the Year ===
Peter Weir – The Truman Show

- James Cameron – Titanic
- Michael Haneke – Funny Games
- Ang Lee – The Ice Storm
- Steven Spielberg – Saving Private Ryan

=== British Director of the Year ===
John Boorman – The General

- Ken Loach – My Name Is Joe

=== Screenwriter of the Year ===
Andrew Niccol – The Truman Show and Gattaca

- Joel and Ethan Coen – The Big Lebowski
- Matt Damon and Ben Affleck – Good Will Hunting
- James Schamus – The Ice Storm
- Neil LaBute – In the Company of Men

=== British Screenwriter of the Year ===
Guy Ritchie – Lock, Stock and Two Smoking Barrels

- Neil Jordan and Patrick McCabe – The Butcher Boy
- John Boorman – The General
- Paul Laverty – My Name Is Joe
- Hossein Amini – The Wings of the Dove

=== Actor of the Year ===
Jack Nicholson – As Good as It Gets

- Matt Damon – Good Will Hunting, The Rainmaker and Saving Private Ryan
- Robert Duvall – The Apostle
- Tom Hanks – Saving Private Ryan
- Kevin Kline – The Ice Storm and In & Out

=== Actress of the Year ===
Cate Blanchett – Elizabeth

- Joan Allen – The Ice Storm
- Pam Grier – Jackie Brown
- Helen Hunt – As Good as It Gets
- Gwyneth Paltrow – Sliding Doors, Great Expectations and A Perfect Murder

=== British Actor of the Year ===
Brendan Gleeson – The General

- John Hurt – Love and Death on Long Island
- Derek Jacobi – Love Is the Devil: Study for a Portrait of Francis Bacon
- Peter Mullan – My Name Is Joe
- Bill Nighy – Still Crazy

=== British Actress of the Year ===
Helena Bonham Carter – The Wings of the Dove

- Julie Christie – Afterglow
- Minnie Driver – The Governess
- Louise Goodall – My Name Is Joe
- Kristin Scott Thomas – The Horse Whisperer
- Kate Winslet – Titanic
- Catherine Zeta-Jones – The Mask of Zorro

=== British Supporting Actor of the Year ===
Nigel Hawthorne – The Object of My Affection

- Daniel Craig – Love Is the Devil: Study for a Portrait of Francis Bacon
- Christopher Eccleston – Elizabeth
- Joseph Fiennes – Elizabeth
- Anthony Hopkins – The Mask of Zorro, Amistad and The Edge
- Vinnie Jones – Lock, Stock and Two Smoking Barrels
- Adrian Lester – Primary Colors
- Rufus Sewell – Martha, Meet Frank, Daniel and Laurence

=== British Supporting Actress of the Year ===
Kate Beckinsale – The Last Days of Disco
Minnie Driver – Good Will Hunting

- Kathy Burke – Dancing at Lughnasa and Elizabeth
- Natascha McElhone – The Truman Show, Mrs. Dalloway and Ronin

=== British Newcomer of the Year ===
Peter Mullen – My Name Is Joe

- Peter Howitt – Sliding Doors
- Eamonn Owens – The Butcher Boy and The General
- Jonathan Rhys-Meyers – Velvet Goldmine, The Disappearance of Finbar and The Governess
- Guy Ritchie – Lock, Stock and Two Smoking Barrels

=== British Producer of the Year ===
Alison Owen, Tim Bevan, Eric Fellner – Elizabeth

==== Dilys Powell Award ====
- Albert Finney
- John Hurt

==== Lifetime Achievement Award ====
- John Box
- John Boorman
