= The Ice Storm (novel) =

1994 novel by Rick Moody

- First edition cover
- Author: Rick Moody
- Language: English
- Genre: Family, Drama, Tragicomedy
- Published: 1994 Little Brown & Co
- Publication place: United States
- Media type: Print (hardback & paperback)
- Pages: 279 pp
- ISBN: 0-316-57921-1
- OCLC: 28422902
- Dewey Decimal: 813/.54 20
- LC Class: PS3563.O5537 I24 1994

The Ice Storm is a 1994 American novel by Rick Moody. The novel was widely acclaimed by readers and critics alike, described as a funny, acerbic, and moving hymn to a dazed and confused era of American life. In 1997, the novel was adapted into an acclaimed feature film directed by Ang Lee.

== Plot summary ==
The novel takes place over Thanksgiving weekend 1973, during a dangerous ice storm, and centers on two neighboring families, the Hoods and the Williamses, and their difficulties in dealing with the tumultuous political and social climate of the day. The setting is an affluent Connecticut suburb during the height of the sexual revolution. The novel is narrated by four members of the two families, each promoting his or her view of complications that arise throughout the novel.

The Hood family members are Ben, Elena, Paul and Wendy, and the Williamses are Jim, Janey, Mikey, and Sandy. The Hood family is overridden with lies. Ben is currently having an affair with his married neighbor Janey. His wife Elena is alienated. Her daughter ventures into sexual liaisons with both females and males, including her neighbors Mikey and Sandy. The story focuses on the 24 hours in which a major ice storm strikes the town of New Canaan, just as both families are melting down from the parents' alcoholism, escapism and adultery, and their children's recreational drug use and sexual experimentation.

== Characters ==
- Ben Hood
- Elena Hood
- Paul Hood
- Wendy Hood
- Janey Williams
- Jim Williams
- Mikey Williams
- Sandy Williams

== Themes and analysis ==
The novel explores the loss of innocence and moral compass in upper-middle class Americans. Its themes find their reflection in the setting: the 1970s at the time of the Watergate scandal in the wake of the sexual revolution. Themes include secrets, permissiveness, vulnerability, betrayal, and absence. Youthful characters engage in sexual experimentation as their parents pursue affairs and otherwise absent themselves from their lives. The rapidly changing sexual mores of the period are reflected in the lives of both families, whose members experiment with traditionally taboo acts such as suicide and adultery.

== Critical reception ==
The Ice Storm was largely commended for its audacity and the many daring subjects explored in the novel. Critic Adam Begley of the Chicago Tribune called the novel: "A bitter and loving and damning tribute to the American family... This is a good book, packed with keen observation and sympathy for human failure" while The Guardian called it "one of the wittiest books about family life ever written." Amanda Heller of The Boston Globe stated "Moody brings this profusion of metaphor to order with a fierce, subversive intelligence. His characters, drawn with a manic acuity that isn't fully accounted for until the end, stay with us long after we've finished reading."

The novel was a moderate success commercially; however its sales were boosted in 1997 with the release of the film adaptation.

== Film adaptation ==
The film adaptation The Ice Storm featured a cast including Sigourney Weaver, Kevin Kline, Joan Allen, Christina Ricci, Tobey Maguire and Elijah Wood. The film was critically acclaimed as an art house film despite a poor box office; however, it gained a modest reception on subsequent home video releases. While remaining more or less faithful to the book, some details were changed. Most notably, Weaver and Jamey Sheridan's characters were named Janey and Jim Carver, while in Moody's book, their surname was Williams.

== Impact ==
The author Junot Díaz claims to have received the idea for the deep structure for The Brief Wondrous Life of Oscar Wao from this book.
