= Paul Thomas Anderson filmography =

Filmography of American filmmaker

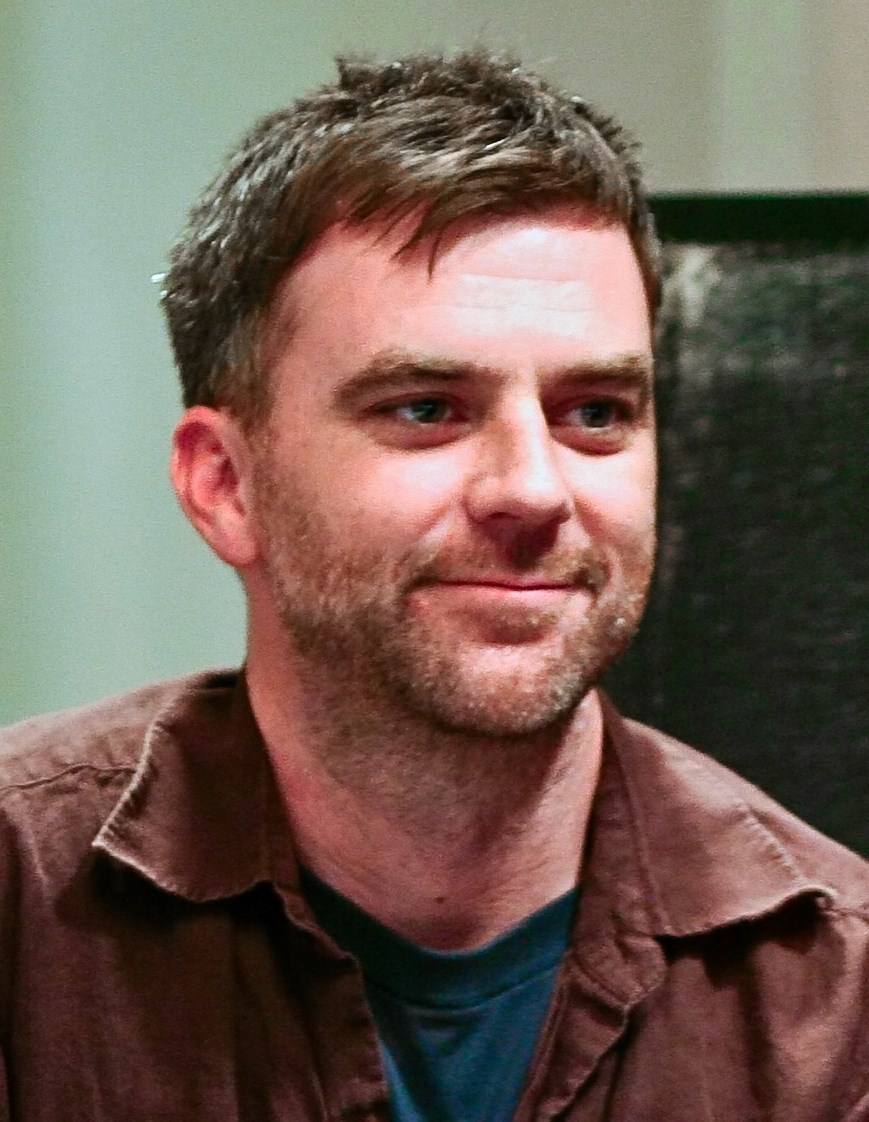
Anderson in 2007

Paul Thomas Anderson is an American filmmaker. He has directed ten feature-length films, five short films, twenty three music videos, two documentaries, one television episode as a guest segment director, and one theatrical play. He made his directorial debut with the mockumentary short film The Dirk Diggler Story (1988), at the age of 18, about a fictional well-endowed pornographic actor in the 1970s. Anderson followed it five years later with another short film, Cigarettes & Coffee (1993). Anderson wrote and directed the crime film Hard Eight (1996), starring Philip Baker Hall, John C. Reilly, Gwyneth Paltrow and Samuel L. Jackson. The film was well received. Using the basis of The Dirk Diggler Story, Anderson wrote and directed an expansion of the film, Boogie Nights (1997). It stars Mark Wahlberg as an actor in the Golden Age of Porn from the 1970s to the 1980s. The film received acclaim from critics and was a commercial success; at the 70th Academy Awards ceremony, the film was nominated for three Academy Awards, including for Best Supporting Actor (Burt Reynolds), Best Supporting Actress (Julianne Moore) and Best Original Screenplay.

His 1999 ensemble film Magnolia followed four intertwined and peculiar stories in the San Fernando Valley. The film was another critical success for Anderson and at the 72nd Academy Awards, it was nominated for three Academy Awards, including for Best Actor in a Supporting Role (Tom Cruise), Best Original Song for "Save Me" by Aimee Mann and Best Original Screenplay. Anderson directed the romantic comedy-drama Punch-Drunk Love (2002), starring Adam Sandler as a lonely man with anger issues. He went on to write and direct There Will Be Blood (2007), based loosely on Upton Sinclair's novel Oil! The film was critically acclaimed, winning numerous awards. It was nominated for seven Academy Awards, including Best Director and Best Picture, with Daniel Day-Lewis winning Best Actor. After a five-year hiatus, he directed the 2012 film The Master starring Joaquin Phoenix and Philip Seymour Hoffman. The film's fictional movement "The Cause" was widely compared to the real-life religion of Scientology in the media, despite not directly referencing it.

Anderson adapted Thomas Pynchon's 2009 novel Inherent Vice into a film of the same name in 2014. Joaquin Phoenix played a stoner hippie and private investigator investigating a case involving the disappearance of his ex-girlfriend and her wealthy boyfriend. In 2015, he directed the documentary Junun about the making of album of the same name in Mehrangarh Fort, Rajasthan, India by the Israeli composer Shye Ben Tzur, English composer and Radiohead guitarist Jonny Greenwood, Indian ensemble the Rajasthan Express, and Radiohead producer Nigel Godrich. Phantom Thread (2017) starred Day-Lewis as a renowned dressmaker in the 1950s. The film was nominated for six Academy Awards, including Best Picture and Best Director for Anderson. Anderson's ninth film, Licorice Pizza (2021), was released to great acclaim, earning him the BAFTA Award for Best Original Screenplay, in addition to nominations for three Academy Awards and two Golden Globes. His tenth film, One Battle After Another, was released in September 2025.

He has directed music videos for such artists as Fiona Apple, Haim, Aimee Mann, Joanna Newsom and Radiohead.

== Film ==
=== Feature films ===
Year	Title	Director	Writer	Producer	DoP	Notes	Ref.
1996	Hard Eight	Yes	Yes	No	No	Original title: Sydney	
1997	Boogie Nights	Yes	Yes	Yes	No		
1999	Magnolia	Yes	Yes	Yes	No		
2002	Punch-Drunk Love	Yes	Yes	Yes	No		
2007	There Will Be Blood	Yes	Yes	Yes	No		
2012	The Master	Yes	Yes	Yes	No		
2014	Inherent Vice	Yes	Yes	Yes	No		
2017	Phantom Thread	Yes	Yes	Yes	Uncredited		
2021	Licorice Pizza	Yes	Yes	Yes	Yes		
2025	One Battle After Another	Yes	Yes	Yes	No		

Documentaries

Year	Title	Credit	Ref.
2015	Junun	Director and camera operator	
2026	Cameron Winter at Carnegie Hall	Director and camera operator	

=== Short films ===
Year	Title	Director	Writer	Producer	Notes	Ref.
1988	The Dirk Diggler Story	Yes	Yes	No	Also cinematographer	
1992	Production Assistant	Yes	Yes	Yes	Released in 2012	
1993	Cigarettes & Coffee	Yes	Yes	No		
1998	Flagpole Special	Yes	Yes	Yes		
2002	Couch	Yes	Yes	Yes		
2003	Blossoms and Blood	Yes	Yes	Yes	Compilation of deleted scenes from Punch-Drunk Love	
2003	12 Scopitones	Yes	Yes	Yes	Compilation of unused artwork from Punch-Drunk Love	
2003	Mattress Man Commercial	Yes	Yes	Yes	Deleted scene from Punch-Drunk Love	
2013	Back Beyond	Yes	Yes	Yes	Compilation of deleted scenes from The Master	
2015	Everything in This Dream	Yes	Yes	Yes	Compilation of deleted scenes from Inherent Vice	
2017	Valentine	Yes	No	No	Live performance by Haim	
2018	For the Hungry Boy	Yes	Yes	Yes	Compilation of deleted scenes from Phantom Thread	
2019	Anima	Yes	No	Yes		

=== Miscellaneous ===
Year	Title	Credit	Ref.
2001	Corky Romano	Uncredited rewrite	
2006	A Prairie Home Companion	Stand-by director	
2018	Waterlily Jaguar	Executive producer	
2023	Killers of the Flower Moon	Uncredited rewrite	
2023	Napoleon	Uncredited rewrite	
TBA	What Happens at Night	Uncredited rewrite	

=== Cameo and documentary appearances ===
Year	Title	Role	Notes	Ref.
1999	Wadd: The Life & Times of John C. Holmes	Himself		
1999	Magnolia	Man confiscating sign	Uncredited	
2000	That Moment: Magnolia Diary	Himself		
2002	Minority Report	Passenger on Train	Uncredited	
2010	In Search of Ted Demme	Himself		
2014	Altman	Himself		

== Television ==
Year	Title	Director	Writer	Actor	Thanks	Notes	Ref.
2000	The Jon Brion Show	Yes	No	No	No	Variety show Unaired TV pilot	
2000	Saturday Night Live	Yes	Yes	No	No	Episode: "Ben Affleck/Fiona Apple"; Segment: "SNL FANatic"	
2016	Documentary Now!	No	No	Yes	No	Voice role: Harrison Renzi; Episode: "Final Transmission"	
2018	Adam Sandler: 100% Fresh	No	No	No	Yes	Stand-up special Filmed segments	

== Music videos ==
Year	Title	Performer	Notes	Ref.
1997	"Try"	Michael Penn		
1998	"Across the Universe"	Fiona Apple		
1998	"Fast as You Can"	Fiona Apple		
1999	"Save Me"	Aimee Mann		
2000	"Limp"	Fiona Apple		
2000	"Paper Bag"	Fiona Apple		
2002	"Here We Go"	Jon Brion		
2013	"Hot Knife"	Fiona Apple		
2015	"Sapokanikan"	Joanna Newsom		
2015	"Divers"	Joanna Newsom		
2016	"Daydreaming"	Radiohead		
2016	"Present Tense"	Radiohead	Live video	
2016	"The Numbers"	Radiohead	Live video	
2017	"Right Now"	Haim	Live video	
2017	"Little of Your Love"	Haim		
2018	"Night So Long"	Haim	Live video	
2019	"Summer Girl"	Haim		
2019	"Now I'm in It"	Haim		
2019	"Hallelujah"	Haim		
2020	"The Steps"	Haim	Co-directed by Danielle Haim	
2020	"Man From the Magazine"	Haim		
2022	"Lost Track"	Haim		
2023	"Wall Of Eyes"	The Smile		
2024	"Friend of a Friend"	The Smile		

== Stage ==
Year	Title	Credit	Theatre	Principal Cast	Ref.
2008	Untitled original theatrical play	Director and playwright	Largo Theatre, Los Angeles	Maya Rudolph, Fred Armisen	

== See also ==
- List of awards and nominations received by Paul Thomas Anderson
