= List of awards and nominations received by Paul Thomas Anderson =

Paul Thomas Anderson awards and nominations
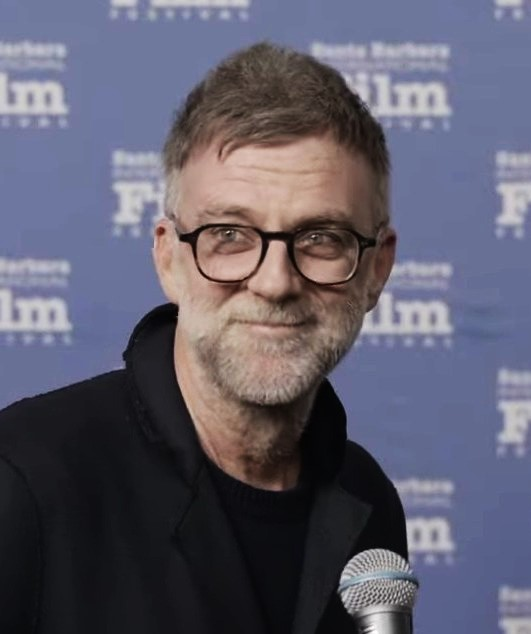
- Anderson in 2022
Awards and nominations
Award	Wins	Nominations
Academy Awards	3	14
BAFTA Awards	4	11
Critics Choice Awards	3	12
Golden Globe Awards	2	3
Grammy Awards	0	1

The following is a list of awards and nominations received by Paul Thomas Anderson.

Paul Thomas Anderson is an American filmmaker. He has received various accolades including, three Academy Awards, two Golden Globe Awards, four British Academy Film Awards, and three Critics' Choice Awards as well as nominations for 14 Academy Awards and a Grammy Award. His films have competed at the Berlin International Film Festival, the Cannes Film Festival, and the Venice International Film Festival.

Anderson made his directorial debut with the crime film Hard Eight (1996) which competed for the Caméra d'Or at the Cannes Film Festival, and was nominated for two Independent Spirit Awards (Best First Feature, and Best First Screenplay). His next two films, the drama focusing on the porn industry during the 1970s Boogie Nights (1997), and the psychological drama Magnolia (1999) both earned nominations for the Academy Award for Best Original Screenplay. His romantic dramedy Punch-Drunk Love (2002) earned him the Cannes Film Festival Award for Best Director.

He gained critical acclaim for his epic period drama There Will Be Blood (2007) earning the Silver Bear for Best Director as well as nominations for three Academy Award nominations for Best Picture, Best Director, and Best Adapted Screenplay. His psychological drama The Master (2012) he won the Silver Lion for Best Director and was nominated for the BAFTA Award for Best Original Screenplay. For his psychedelic neo-noir Inherent Vice (2014) he won the Independent Spirit Robert Altman Award and was nominated for the Academy Award for Best Adapted Screenplay. He directed the period romance drama Phantom Thread (2017) which earned nominations for two Academy Awards (Best Picture and Best Director).

For his coming-of-age comedy-drama Licorice Pizza (2021) he won the BAFTA Award for Best Original Screenplay and earned nominations for three Academy Award (Best Picture, Best Director, and Best Original Screenplay) and a Golden Globe Award (Best Screenplay). He was nominated for the Grammy Award for Best Music Film for his work on the 15-minute Netflix film Anima (2019) which accompanied the Thom Yorke album. Anderson's tenth film, One Battle After Another, was released in 2025 and won him his first Academy Awards, for Best Picture, Director, and Adapted Screenplay.

== Major associations ==
=== Academy Awards ===
Year	Category	Nominated work	Result	Ref.
1998	Best Original Screenplay	Boogie Nights	Nominated	
2000	Best Original Screenplay	Magnolia	Nominated	
2008	Best Picture	There Will Be Blood	Nominated	
2008	Best Director	There Will Be Blood	Nominated	
2008	Best Adapted Screenplay	There Will Be Blood	Nominated	
2015	Best Adapted Screenplay	Inherent Vice	Nominated	
2018	Best Picture	Phantom Thread	Nominated	
2018	Best Director	Phantom Thread	Nominated	
2022	Best Picture	Licorice Pizza	Nominated	
2022	Best Director	Licorice Pizza	Nominated	
2022	Best Original Screenplay	Licorice Pizza	Nominated	
2026	Best Picture	One Battle After Another	Won	
2026	Best Director	One Battle After Another	Won	
2026	Best Adapted Screenplay	One Battle After Another	Won	

=== BAFTA Awards ===
Year	Category	Nominated work	Result	Ref.
British Academy Film Awards
1998	Best Original Screenplay	Boogie Nights	Nominated	
2008	Best Film	There Will Be Blood	Nominated	
2008	Best Director	There Will Be Blood	Nominated	
2008	Best Adapted Screenplay	There Will Be Blood	Nominated	
2013	Best Original Screenplay	The Master	Nominated	
2022	Best Original Screenplay	Licorice Pizza	Won	
2022	Best Film	Licorice Pizza	Nominated	
2022	Best Director	Licorice Pizza	Nominated	
2026	Best Director	One Battle After Another	Won	
2026	Best Film	One Battle After Another	Won	
2026	Best Adapted Screenplay	One Battle After Another	Won	

=== Critics' Choice Awards ===
Year	Category	Nominated work	Result	Ref.
Critics' Choice Movie Awards
1998	Best Picture	Boogie Nights	Nominated	
2000	Best Picture	Magnolia	Nominated	
2008	Best Picture	There Will Be Blood	Nominated	
2013	Best Picture	The Master	Nominated	
2013	Best Original Screenplay	The Master	Nominated	
2015	Best Adapted Screenplay	Inherent Vice	Nominated	
2022	Best Picture	Licorice Pizza	Nominated	
2022	Best Director	Licorice Pizza	Nominated	
2022	Best Original Screenplay	Licorice Pizza	Nominated	
2026	Best Picture	One Battle After Another	Won	
2026	Best Director	One Battle After Another	Won	
2026	Best Adapted Screenplay	One Battle After Another	Won	

=== Golden Globe Awards ===
Year	Category	Nominated work	Result	Ref.
2022	Best Screenplay – Motion Picture	Licorice Pizza	Nominated	
2026	Best Screenplay – Motion Picture	One Battle After Another	Won	
2026	Best Director – Motion Picture	One Battle After Another	Won	

=== Grammy Awards ===
Year	Category	Nominated work	Result	Ref.
2020	Best Music Film	Anima	Nominated	

== Critics awards ==
Organizations	Year	Category	Work	Result	Ref.
Argentine Film Critics Association	2021	Best Foreign Film	Phantom Thread	Nominated	
Astra Film Awards	2026	Best Director	One Battle After Another	Nominated	
Astra Film Awards	2026	Best Adapted Screenplay	One Battle After Another	Won	
Boston Society of Film Critics Awards	1997	Best New Filmmaker	Boogie Nights	Won	
Boston Society of Film Critics Awards	2012	Best Director	The Master	Runner-up	
Boston Society of Film Critics Awards	2017	Best Director	Phantom Thread	Won	
Boston Society of Film Critics Awards	2025	Best Adapted Screenplay	One Battle After Another	Won	
Chicago Film Critics Association Awards	1998	Best Director	Boogie Nights	Nominated	
Chicago Film Critics Association Awards	2000	Best Director	Magnolia	Nominated	
Chicago Film Critics Association Awards	2000	Best Screenplay	Magnolia	Nominated	
Chicago Film Critics Association Awards	2003	Best Director	Punch-Drunk Love	Nominated	
Chicago Film Critics Association Awards	2003	Best Screenplay	Punch-Drunk Love	Nominated	
Chicago Film Critics Association Awards	2007	Best Director	There Will Be Blood	Nominated	
Chicago Film Critics Association Awards	2007	Best Adapted Screenplay	There Will Be Blood	Nominated	
Chicago Film Critics Association Awards	2012	Best Director	The Master	Nominated	
Chicago Film Critics Association Awards	2012	Best Original Screenplay	The Master	Nominated	
Chicago Film Critics Association Awards	2014	Best Adapted Screenplay	Inherent Vice	Nominated	
Chicago Film Critics Association Awards	2021	Best Director	Licorice Pizza	Nominated	
Chicago Film Critics Association Awards	2021	Best Original Screenplay	Licorice Pizza	Won	
Chicago Film Critics Association Awards	2025	Best Film	One Battle After Another	Won	
Chicago Film Critics Association Awards	2025	Best Director	One Battle After Another	Won	
Chicago Film Critics Association Awards	2025	Best Adapted Screenplay	One Battle After Another	Won	
Los Angeles Film Critics Association Awards	1997	New Generation Award	Boogie Nights and Hard Eight	Won	
Los Angeles Film Critics Association Awards	2007	Best Picture	There Will Be Blood	Won	
Los Angeles Film Critics Association Awards	2007	Best Screenplay	There Will Be Blood	Runner-up	
Los Angeles Film Critics Association Awards	2012	Best Adapted Screenplay	The Master	Runner-up	
Los Angeles Film Critics Association Awards	2012	Best Director	The Master	Won	
Los Angeles Film Critics Association Awards	2021	Best Screenplay	Licorice Pizza	Runner-up	
Los Angeles Film Critics Association Awards	2025	Best Film	One Battle After Another	Won	
Los Angeles Film Critics Association Awards	2025	Best Director	One Battle After Another	Won	
National Board of Review	1997	Top Ten Films	Boogie Nights	Nominated	
National Board of Review	1999	Top Ten Films	Magnolia	Nominated	
National Board of Review	2014	Best Adapted Screenplay	Inherent Vice	Won	
National Board of Review	2014	Top Ten Films	Inherent Vice	Nominated	
National Board of Review	2017	Best Original Screenplay	Phantom Thread	Won	
National Board of Review	2017	Top Ten Films	Phantom Thread	Nominated	
National Board of Review	2021	Best Director	Licorice Pizza	Won	
National Board of Review	2021	Top Ten Films	Licorice Pizza	Nominated	
National Board of Review	2025	Best Film	One Battle After Another	Won	
National Board of Review	2025	Best Director	One Battle After Another	Won	
National Society of Film Critics	2007	Best Picture	There Will Be Blood	Won	
National Society of Film Critics	2007	Best Director	There Will Be Blood	Won	
National Society of Film Critics	2025	Best Picture	One Battle After Another	Won	
National Society of Film Critics	2025	Best Director	One Battle After Another	Won	
New York Film Critics Circle	2007	Best Film	There Will Be Blood	Runner-up	
New York Film Critics Circle	2007	Best Director	There Will Be Blood	Runner-up	
New York Film Critics Circle	2012	Best Picture	The Master	Runner-up	
New York Film Critics Circle	2012	Best Director	The Master	Runner-up	
New York Film Critics Circle	2017	Best Screenplay	Phantom Thread	Won	
New York Film Critics Circle	2021	Best Screenplay	Licorice Pizza	Won	
New York Film Critics Circle	2025	Best Film	One Battle After Another	Won	

== Miscellaneous awards ==
Organizations	Year	Category	Work	Result	Ref.
AACTA International Awards	2013	Best Screenplay	The Master	Nominated	
AACTA International Awards	2022	Best Director	Licorice Pizza	Nominated	
AACTA International Awards	2022	Best Screenplay	Licorice Pizza	Nominated	
AACTA International Awards	2026	Best Director	One Battle After Another	Won	
AACTA International Awards	2026	Best Screenplay	One Battle After Another	Nominated	
AARP Movies for Grownups Awards	2025	Best Director	One Battle After Another	Nominated	
AARP Movies for Grownups Awards	2025	Best Screenwriter	One Battle After Another	Won	
Berlin International Film Festival	2000	Golden Bear	Magnolia	Won	
Berlin International Film Festival	2000	Reader Jury of the Berliner Morgenpost	Magnolia	Won	
Berlin International Film Festival	2008	Golden Bear	There Will Be Blood	Nominated	
Berlin International Film Festival	2008	Silver Bear for Best Director	There Will Be Blood	Won	
Cannes Film Festival	1996	Caméra d'Or	Hard Eight	Nominated	
Cannes Film Festival	2002	Palme d'Or	Punch-Drunk Love	Nominated	
Cannes Film Festival	2002	Best Director	Punch-Drunk Love	Won	
Capri Hollywood International Film Festival	2021	Capri Producer Award (Note: Shared with Sara Murphy and Adam Somner)	Licorice Pizza	Won	
Capri Hollywood International Film Festival	2025	Best Director	One Battle After Another	Won	
Directors Guild of America Awards	2008	Outstanding Directing – Feature Film	There Will Be Blood	Nominated	
Directors Guild of America Awards	2022	Outstanding Directing – Feature Film	Licorice Pizza	Nominated	
Directors Guild of America Awards	2026	Outstanding Directing – Feature Film	One Battle After Another	Won	
David di Donatello	2008	Best Foreign Film	There Will Be Blood	Nominated	
David di Donatello	2019	Best Foreign Film	Phantom Thread	Nominated	
David di Donatello	2023	Best Foreign Film	Licorice Pizza	Nominated	
Gotham Awards	2012	Best Feature	The Master	Nominated	
Gotham Awards	2025	Best Feature	One Battle After Another	Won	
Gotham Awards	2025	Best Director	One Battle After Another	Nominated	
Gotham Awards	2025	Best Adapted Screenplay	One Battle After Another	Nominated	
Independent Spirit Awards	1998	Best First Feature	Hard Eight	Nominated	
Independent Spirit Awards	1998	Best First Screenplay	Hard Eight	Nominated	
Independent Spirit Awards	2014	Robert Altman Award	Inherent Vice	Won	
Nastro d'Argento	2000	Best Foreign Film	Magnolia	Nominated	
Nastro d'Argento	2008	Best Foreign Film	There Will Be Blood	Nominated	
Producers Guild of America Awards	2008	Best Theatrical Motion Picture	There Will Be Blood	Nominated	
Producers Guild of America Awards	2022	Best Theatrical Motion Picture	Licorice Pizza	Nominated	
Producers Guild of America Awards	2026	Best Theatrical Motion Picture	One Battle After Another	Won	
Satellite Awards	1998	Best Film – Drama	Boogie Nights	Nominated	
Satellite Awards	1998	Best Director	Boogie Nights	Nominated	
Satellite Awards	1998	Best Original Screenplay	Boogie Nights	Nominated	
Satellite Awards	2000	Best Film – Drama	Magnolia	Nominated	
Satellite Awards	2000	Best Director	Magnolia	Nominated	
Satellite Awards	2012	Best Film – Drama	The Master	Nominated	
Satellite Awards	2014	Best Adapted Screenplay	Inherent Vice	Nominated	
Satellite Awards	2022	Best Motion Picture – Comedy or Musical	Licorice Pizza	Nominated	
Satellite Awards	2022	Best Original Screenplay	Licorice Pizza	Nominated	
Satellite Awards	2026	Best Motion Picture – Drama	One Battle After Another	Nominated	
Satellite Awards	2026	Best Director	One Battle After Another	Nominated	
Satellite Awards	2026	Best Adapted Screenplay	One Battle After Another	Won	
Venice Film Festival	2012	Golden Lion	The Master	Nominated	
Venice Film Festival	2012	Silver Lion for Best Director	The Master	Won	
Venice Film Festival	2012	FIPRESCI Prize	The Master	Won	
Writers Guild of America Awards	1998	Best Original Screenplay	Boogie Nights	Nominated	
Writers Guild of America Awards	2002	Best Original Screenplay	Magnolia	Nominated	
Writers Guild of America Awards	2008	Best Adapted Screenplay	There Will Be Blood	Nominated	
Writers Guild of America Awards	2013	Best Original Screenplay	The Master	Nominated	
Writers Guild of America Awards	2022	Best Original Screenplay	Licorice Pizza	Nominated	
Writers Guild of America Awards	2026	Best Adapted Screenplay	One Battle After Another	Won	

== Awards received by Anderson movies ==
Year	Film	Academy Awards		BAFTA Awards		Golden Globe Awards	
Year	Film	Nominations	Wins	Nominations	Wins	Nominations	Wins
1997	Boogie Nights	3		2		2	1
1999	Magnolia	3				2	1
2002	Punch-Drunk Love					1	
2007	There Will Be Blood	8	2	9	1	2	1
2012	The Master	3		4		3	
2014	Inherent Vice	2				1	
2017	Phantom Thread	6	1	4	1	2	
2021	Licorice Pizza	3		5	1	4	
2025	One Battle After Another	13	6	14	6	9	4
Total		41	9	38	9	26	7

== Critical reception ==
Year	Title	Rotten Tomatoes	Metacritic
1996	Hard Eight	83% (52 reviews)	78% (14 reviews)
1997	Boogie Nights	94% (77 reviews)	86% (28 reviews)
1999	Magnolia	82% (219 reviews)	78% (34 reviews)
2002	Punch-Drunk Love	79% (203 reviews)	78% (37 reviews)
2007	There Will Be Blood	91% (246 reviews)	93% (42 reviews)
2012	The Master	85% (258 reviews)	86% (43 reviews)
2014	Inherent Vice	73% (252 reviews)	81% (43 reviews)
2017	Phantom Thread	91% (357 reviews)	90% (51 reviews)
2021	Licorice Pizza	90% (325 reviews)	90% (55 reviews)
2025	One Battle After Another	96% (319 reviews)	95% (54 reviews)

== Directed nominated performances ==
=== Academy Award ===
The following actors received Academy Award nominations for their performances in Anderson's films.

Year	Performer	Film	Result
Academy Award for Best Actor
2008	Daniel Day-Lewis	There Will Be Blood	Won
2013	Joaquin Phoenix	The Master	Nominated
2018	Daniel Day-Lewis	Phantom Thread	Nominated
2026	Leonardo DiCaprio	One Battle After Another	Nominated
Academy Award for Best Supporting Actor
1998	Burt Reynolds	Boogie Nights	Nominated
2000	Tom Cruise	Magnolia	Nominated
2013	Philip Seymour Hoffman	The Master	Nominated
2026	Benicio del Toro	One Battle After Another	Nominated
2026	Sean Penn	One Battle After Another	Won
Academy Award for Best Supporting Actress
1998	Julianne Moore	Boogie Nights	Nominated
2013	Amy Adams	The Master	Nominated
2018	Lesley Manville	Phantom Thread	Nominated
2026	Teyana Taylor	One Battle After Another	Nominated

=== BAFTA Award ===
The following actors received BAFTA nominations for their performances in Anderson's films.

Year	Performer	Film	Result
BAFTA Award for Best Actor in a Leading Role
2008	Daniel Day-Lewis	There Will Be Blood	Won
2013	Joaquin Phoenix	The Master	Nominated
2018	Daniel Day-Lewis	Phantom Thread	Nominated
2026	Leonardo DiCaprio	One Battle After Another	Nominated
BAFTA Award for Best Actress in a Leading Role
2022	Alana Haim	Licorice Pizza	Nominated
2026	Chase Infiniti	One Battle After Another	Nominated
BAFTA Award for Best Actor in a Supporting Role
1998	Burt Reynolds	Boogie Nights	Nominated
2008	Paul Dano	There Will Be Blood	Nominated
2013	Philip Seymour Hoffman	The Master	Nominated
2026	Benicio del Toro	One Battle After Another	Nominated
2026	Sean Penn	One Battle After Another	Won
BAFTA Award for Best Supporting Actress
1998	Julianne Moore	Boogie Nights	Nominated
2013	Amy Adams	The Master	Nominated
2018	Lesley Manville	Phantom Thread	Nominated
2026	Teyana Taylor	One Battle After Another	Nominated

=== Critics Choice Award ===
The following actors received Critics Choice Award nominations for their performances in Anderson's films.

Year	Performer	Film	Result
Critics' Choice Movie Award for Best Actor
2008	Daniel Day-Lewis	There Will Be Blood	Won
2013	Joaquin Phoenix	The Master	Nominated
2018	Daniel Day-Lewis	Phantom Thread	Nominated
2026	Leonardo DiCaprio	One Battle After Another	Nominated
Critics' Choice Movie Award for Best Actress
2022	Alana Haim	Licorice Pizza	Nominated
2026	Chase Infiniti	One Battle After Another	Nominated
Critics' Choice Movie Award for Best Supporting Actor
1998	Burt Reynolds	Boogie Nights	Nominated
2013	Philip Seymour Hoffman	The Master	Won
2015	Josh Brolin	Inherent Vice	Nominated
2026	Benicio del Toro	One Battle After Another	Nominated
2026	Sean Penn	One Battle After Another	Nominated
Critics' Choice Movie Award for Best Supporting Actress
2013	Amy Adams	The Master	Nominated
2026	Teyana Taylor	One Battle After Another	Nominated
Critics' Choice Movie Award for Best Young Performer
2022	Cooper Hoffman	Licorice Pizza	Nominated

=== Golden Globe Award ===
The following actors received Golden Globe Award nominations for their performances in Anderson's films.

Year	Performer	Film	Result
Golden Globe Award for Best Actor in a Motion Picture – Drama
2008	Daniel Day-Lewis	There Will Be Blood	Won
2013	Joaquin Phoenix	The Master	Nominated
2018	Daniel Day-Lewis	Phantom Thread	Nominated
Golden Globe Award for Best Actor in a Motion Picture – Musical or Comedy
2003	Adam Sandler	Punch-Drunk Love	Nominated
2015	Joaquin Phoenix	Inherent Vice	Nominated
2022	Cooper Hoffman	Licorice Pizza	Nominated
2026	Leonardo DiCaprio	One Battle After Another	Nominated
Golden Globe Award for Best Actress in a Motion Picture – Musical or Comedy
2022	Alana Haim	Licorice Pizza	Nominated
2026	Chase Infiniti	One Battle After Another	Nominated
Golden Globe Award for Best Supporting Actor – Motion Picture
1998	Burt Reynolds	Boogie Nights	Won
1998	Tom Cruise	Magnolia	Won
2013	Philip Seymour Hoffman	The Master	Nominated
2026	Benicio del Toro	One Battle After Another	Nominated
2026	Sean Penn	One Battle After Another	Nominated
Golden Globe Award for Best Supporting Actress – Motion Picture
1998	Julianne Moore	Boogie Nights	Nominated
2013	Amy Adams	The Master	Nominated
2026	Teyana Taylor	One Battle After Another	Won

== See also ==
- Paul Thomas Anderson filmography
