= Rusty Schwimmer =

American actress

- Occupation: Actress
- Years active: 1988–present

Rusty Schwimmer is an American character actress and singer. She has appeared in films such as A Little Princess (1995), Twister (1996), The Perfect Storm (2000), Runaway Jury (2003), North Country (2005), The Informant! (2009), and The Sessions (2012).

== Early life ==
Schwimmer attended New Trier High School in suburban Winnetka, Illinois. Her best friend is actress Virginia Madsen.

== Career ==
Schwimmer made her film debut in 1988, appearing in Memories of Me. She had small parts in Highlander II: The Quickening, Sleepwalkers and Candyman, before playing Joey B in Jason Goes to Hell: The Final Friday (1993). In 1995, she starred as Amelia Minchin in A Little Princess directed by Alfonso Cuarón. She went on to appear as Mrs. Thornton (Jo Harding's mother) in Twister (1996), Mrs Pendleton in Amistad (1997), Gridlock'd (1997), Alice in EDtv (1999), Irene "Big Red" Johnson in The Perfect Storm (2000), Millie Dupree in Runaway Jury (2003), Big Betty in North Country (2005), and as office worker Peggy Displasia in The Belko Experiment in 2016.

On television, Schwimmer had a starring role in the 2006 Western miniseries Broken Trail playing "Big Rump" Kate Becker. From 2001 to 2003, she had a recurring role as Barbara Ludzinski on the CBS legal drama The Guardian. Schwimmer has also appeared in guest starring roles in several television series, including Parker Lewis Can't Lose, In the Heat of the Night, The Fresh Prince of Bel-Air, Tales from the Crypt, Married... with Children, ER, Chicago Hope, Ally McBeal, Judging Amy, The X-Files, Gilmore Girls, CSI: Crime Scene Investigation, Criminal Minds, Heroes, Desperate Housewives, Boston Legal, Private Practice, Six Feet Under, Drop Dead Diva, Louie, Lucifer, Grey's Anatomy, Bones and Better Call Saul. She also appeared in The Guardians of the Galaxy Holiday Special.

Schwimmer also appeared in Paul Thomas Anderson’s teenage short film The Dirk Diggler Story, an early version of Boogie Nights.

== Filmography ==
=== Film ===
Year	Title	Role	Notes
1988	Memories of Me	Strawberry	
1988	The Dirk Diggler Story	Candy Kane	Short
1989	Angels of the City	Bookworm	
1991	Highlander II: The Quickening	Drunk	
1992	Sleepwalkers	Housewife	
1992	Candyman	Policewoman	
1993	Reckless Kelly	Entertainment Reporter	
1993	Jason Goes to Hell: The Final Friday	Joey B.	
1994	The Crazysitter	German Nanny	
1995	A Little Princess	Mrs Amelia Minchin	
1995	Lone Justice 2	Emma	
1996	Twister	Mrs. Thornton	
1997	Gridlock'd	Nurse	
1997	Amistad	Mrs. Pendleton	
1997	Los Locos	Sister Drexel	
1998	Almost Heroes	Execution Witness	Uncredited
1998	The Thin Pink Line	Nora Finkelheimer	
1999	EDtv	Alice	
1999	Ballad of the Nightingale	Distributor	
2000	The Perfect Storm	Irene 'Big Red' Johnson	
2000	I'll Wave Back	Zeola	
2003	Runaway Jury	Millie Dupree	
2003	Harold Buttleman, Daredevil Stuntman	Ronette	
2005	Mozart and the Whale	Gracie	
2005	North Country	Big Betty	
2006	The Hawk Is Dying	Precious	
2006	Beautiful Dreamer	Jeannie	
2008	Fly Like Mercury	Dr. Sims	
2008	Pants on Fire	Peggy	
2009	The Informant!	Liz Taylor	
2012	The Sessions	Jan	
2012	Scrooge & Marley	Freda	
2012	Melvin Smarty	Margie	
2013	Crystal Lake Memories: The Complete History of Friday the 13th	Herself	Documentary film
2014	Perfect Sisters	Aunt Martha	
2014	Sunken City	Wanda	
2015	The Life and Death of an Unhappily Married Man	Kim	
2016	American Fable	Ethel	
2016	Blood Stripe	Dot	
2016	The Belko Experiment	Peggy Displasia	
2017	Wild Honey	Gabby	
2018	30 Miles from Nowhere	Officer Marsh	
2019	The Short History of the Long Road	Marcie	
2020	Killing Eleanor	Pam	
2021	Rushed	Joan	
2022	North of the 10	Jackie	
2026	You Can't Win	Salt Chunk Mary	Filmed in 2012.
TBA	Penitentia	Shelly Wolf	

=== Television ===
Year	Title	Role	Notes
1988	Addicted to His Love	Woman at Video Dating Service	Television film
1990	Running Against Time	Sales Rep	Television film
1991	Parker Lewis Can't Lose	Lady	Episode: "Teens from a Mall"
1991	Life Goes On	Teacher	Episode: "Armageddon"
1992	Stand by Your Man	Gloria	Television film
1992	Getting Up and Going Home	Julia Stevenson	Television film
1992	T Bone N Weasel	Verna Mae	Television film
1992–1995	Picket Fences	Julia Boles / Sheila	3 episodes
1993	Darkness Before Dawn	Evelyn	Television film
1993	In the Heat of the Night	Betty Simms	2 episodes
1993	Ned Blessing: The True Story of My Life	Big Emma	5 episodes
1994	The Fresh Prince of Bel-Air	Big Bertha	Episode: "Fresh Prince: The Movie"
1994	Tales from the Crypt	Carla	Episode: "In the Groove"
1995	Married... with Children	Babs	Episode: "And Bingo Was Her Game-O"
1995	ER	Grollman	Episode: "Men Plan, God Laughs"
1995	18 Minutes in Albuquerque	Bus Driver	Television film
1995	Down, Out & Dangerous	Bartender	Television film
1996	The Louie Show	Nurse	Episode: "Louie's Little Trip"
1996	Chicago Hope	Veronica Sarison	Episode: "Quiet Riot"
1996	If These Walls Could Talk	Prayer Group	Television film
1996	The Man Who Captured Eichmann	Rosa	Television film
1997	North Shore Fish	Nurse	Television film
1997	Prison of Secrets	Carla	Television film
1997	Ally McBeal	Angela Tharpe	Episode: "The Promise"
1997	Heartless	Connie	Television film
1999	Providence	Ms. Polly Maravich	Episode: "All Good Dogs Go to Heaven"
1999	Tracey Takes On...	Protester	Episode: "Erotica"
1999	Ally	Angela Tharpe	Episode: "The Promise"
2000	Judging Amy	Alice Benedict	Episode: "Culture Clash"
2000	The X-Files	Driver	Episode: "Roadrunners"
2000–2001	Ladies Man	Mel	4 episodes
2001, 2002	Arliss	Inkeeper / Rusty Schwimmer	2 episodes
2001–2003	The Guardian	Barbara Ludzinski	9 episodes
2002	Six Feet Under	Marilyn Johnson	Episode: "It's the Most Wonderful Time of the Year"
2003	My Big Fat Greek Life	Permit Office Clerk	Episode: "The Free Lunch"
2003	Gilmore Girls	Bruce	2 episodes
2003	Clifford's Puppy Days	Voice	Episode: "Clifford's Field Trip/Helping Paws"
2004	Boston Public	Billy's Mom	Episode: "Chapter Eighty"
2004	LAX	Pam	Episode: "The Longest Morning"
2004	Boston Legal	Helen Binder	Episode: "An Eye for an Eye"
2004	Dragnet	Lorraine Watson	Episode: "Killing Fields"
2004	CSI: Crime Scene Investigation	Lorna Tenney	Episode: "No Humans Involved"
2006	Broken Trail	Big Rump Kate	2 episodes
2006	Without a Trace	Sharon Zenowich	Episode: "Watch Over Me"
2006	Shark	Wendy Dunmiller	Episode: "Sins of the Mother"
2006	American Dad!	Mama Squirrel	Episode: "Irregarding Steve"
2006–2007	Holly Hobbie & Friends	Aunt Jessie Beech	3 episodes
2007	Criminal Minds	Lila May	Episode: "No Way Out"
2007	Heroes	Dale Smither	Episode: "Unexpected"
2007	Desperate Housewives	Toni	Episode: "Into the Woods"
2007	State of Mind	Conchata Gluck / Diner Operator	3 episodes
2007	Private Practice	Ashley Minahan	Episode: "In Which Sam Gets Taken for a Ride"
2009	Numbers	Deanne Drake	Episode: "Arrow of Time"
2009	The Secret Life of the American Teenager	—N/a	Episode: "Summertime"
2009	Days of Our Lives	Sister Claire	5 episodes
2009	His Name Was Jason: 30 Years of Friday the 13th	Herself	Documentary film
2010	Bones	Erica Turner	Episode: "The Devil in the Details"
2010	Drop Dead Diva	Sandra	Episode: "Will & Grayson"
2010	Donna's Revenge	Dr. Skinner	2 episodes
2011	Louie	Gretchen	Episode: "Pregnant"
2012	Longmire	Darla Lamebull	Episode: "Dogs, Horses and Indians"
2012	Georgia	Sunshine	Episode: "Hello, I'm Sunshine"
2013	Film Pigs	Trudy / Self	Episode: "A Little Rusty"
2014	Greetings! From Prison	Mom	Episode: "Mother Knows Nothing"
2015	Backstrom	Analeigh Kee	Episode: "Corkscrewed"
2016	Heartbeat	Dr. Risa Bennett	Episode: "Sanctuary"
2016	Lucifer	Roberta Beliard	Episode: "Everything's Coming Up Lucifer"
2016	Grey's Anatomy	Patricia Phillips	Episode: "Catastrophe and the Cure"
2017	Doubt	ADA Courtney Carmody	Episode: "Faith"
2018	Chicago Fire	Jill	Episode: "The One That Matters Most"
2018	Mr. Mercedes	Wanda	Episode: "Walk Like a Man"
2020	Paradise Lost	Virgie Perkins	Episode: "Danger to Yourself"
2022	The Righteous Gemstones	Sheriff Brenda	3 episodes
2022	Chicago Med	Celeste Belkin	Episode: "End of the Day, Anything Can Happen"
2022	Better Call Saul	Legal Aid Lawyer	Episode: "Saul Gone"
2022	The Guardians of the Galaxy Holiday Special	Sara	Television special
2024	9-1-1	Edna	Episode: "Abandon Ships"
2025	The Last Frontier	Katherine Van Horn	Recurring role
2026–present	The Pitt	Monica Peters	Recurring role
2027	Scooby-Doo: Origins	TBA	Filming
