= The Master (2012 film) =

Film by Paul Thomas Anderson

- Theatrical release poster
- Directed by: Paul Thomas Anderson
- Written by: Paul Thomas Anderson
- Produced by: JoAnne Sellar; Daniel Lupi; Paul Thomas Anderson; Megan Ellison
- Starring: Joaquin Phoenix; Philip Seymour Hoffman; Amy Adams; Laura Dern
- Cinematography: Mihai Mălaimare Jr.
- Edited by: Leslie Jones; Peter McNulty
- Music by: Jonny Greenwood
- Production companies: JoAnne Sellar Productions; Ghoulardi Film Company; Annapurna Pictures
- Distributed by: The Weinstein Company
- Release dates: September 1, 2012 (Venice); September 14, 2012 (United States)
- Running time: 137 minutes
- Country: United States
- Language: English
- Budget: $32 million
- Box office: $28.3 million

The Master is a 2012 American period psychological drama film written and directed by Paul Thomas Anderson and starring Joaquin Phoenix, Philip Seymour Hoffman, and Amy Adams. It tells the story of Freddie Quell (Phoenix), a World War II Navy veteran struggling to adjust to a post-war society, who meets Lancaster Dodd (Hoffman), the leader of a cult known as The Cause. Dodd sees something in Quell and accepts him into the movement. Quell takes a liking to The Cause and begins traveling with Dodd's family to spread his teachings.

The film was produced by Annapurna Pictures and Ghoulardi Film Company and distributed by The Weinstein Company. The film's inspirations were varied: it was partly inspired by Scientology founder L. Ron Hubbard, early drafts of Anderson's There Will Be Blood, the novel V. by Thomas Pynchon, John Huston's documentary Let There Be Light about WWII veterans with PTSD, drunken Navy stories that Jason Robards had told to Anderson while filming Magnolia, and the life story of author John Steinbeck. The Master was shot almost entirely on 65 mm film stock, making it the first fiction feature to be shot and released in 70mm since Kenneth Branagh's Hamlet in 1996.

Initially, the film was set up with Universal Pictures, but fell through due to script and budget problems. It was first publicly shown on August 3, 2012, at the American Cinematheque in 70 mm and screened variously in the same way, before officially premiering at the Venice Film Festival on September 1, where it won three awards: the FIPRESCI Award for Best Film; the Silver Lion for Anderson's direction; and the Volpi Cup for Best Actor, shared by Phoenix and Hoffman. It was released in theaters in the United States on September 14, 2012, to critical acclaim; its performances (particularly those from the three leads), screenplay, direction, plausibility, and realistic portrayal of post-World War II Americans were praised.

Considered one of Anderson's finest works and one of the best films of the 2010s and the 21st century, it received three Oscar nominations: Best Actor for Phoenix, Best Supporting Actor for Hoffman, and Best Supporting Actress for Adams. In 2016, The Master was ranked the 24th in the BBC's 100 Greatest Films of the 21st Century. Anderson has repeatedly stated that The Master is his favorite film of those he has made.

== Plot ==
In early 1950, Freddie Quell is a sex-obsessed alcoholic Navy veteran struggling to adjust to post-war society in the wake of World War II. Prone to violent and erratic behavior, he is fired from his job as a department store photographer after getting into a fight with a customer. He works on a Filipino-American community farm in California until an elderly colleague collapses after drinking Freddie's moonshine. Freddie is accused of poisoning him and flees.

In San Francisco, Freddie stows away on the yacht of a follower of Lancaster Dodd, the charismatic leader of a philosophical movement known as "The Cause." When he is discovered, Dodd describes Freddie as "aberrated" and claims to have met him in the past but cannot remember where. He invites Freddie to stay to attend the marriage of his daughter, and to make more moonshine for which Dodd has developed a taste. Dodd begins an exercise with Freddie called "processing," in which he asks Freddie a flurry of disturbing psychological questions. Freddie breaks down at the end of the exercise while recalling his past relationship with Doris, a girl from his hometown to whom he promised to return.

Freddie travels with Dodd's family as they spread The Cause along the East Coast. Dodd's family consist of his wife, Peggy, his adult children, Val and Elizabeth, and Elizabeth's new husband, Clark. While at a dinner party in New York, a man accuses The Cause of being a cult. Dodd berates him and asks him to leave. Freddie pursues the man and assaults him, to Dodd's dismay. Dodd's wife Peggy starts having misgivings about Freddie's presence.

Freddie criticizes Dodd's son, Val, for disregarding his father's teachings, but Val says Dodd is making it up as he goes along. Dodd is arrested for practicing medicine without qualifications; Freddie attacks the police officers and is also taken into custody. In jail, Freddie erupts in an angry tirade, questioning everything Dodd taught him, and accusing him of being a fake. Dodd calls Freddie lazy and worthless, claiming nobody but Dodd likes him. Upon release, they reconcile, but members of The Cause have become suspicious and fearful of Freddie, believing him to be deranged, an undercover agent, or simply beyond help. Dodd insists Freddie's behavior can be corrected with rigorous conditioning, which Freddie struggles to internalize.

Freddie accompanies Dodd to Phoenix, Arizona, to celebrate the release of Dodd's book. When Dodd's publisher criticizes it, Freddie assaults him. Dodd loses his temper with acolyte Helen Sullivan after she questions inconsistencies between the new book and Dodd's previous publications. Dodd takes a group to a salt flat for a game consisting of picking a point in the distance and riding towards it on Dodd's motorcycle. Freddie takes his turn but does not return, disappearing into the horizon.

Freddie returns home to Lynn, Massachusetts, to visit Doris, but learns from her mother that she has married and started a family. Sleeping in a movie theater, Freddie receives a phone call from Dodd begging him to visit him in England, where he now resides. Deciding to go, Freddie finds The Cause has grown ever larger. The previously skeptical Val is now a high-ranking member of The Cause, while Elizabeth and Clark have been expelled from the organization. Peggy rebuffs Freddie as being a lost cause, but Dodd is still hopeful that he can sway Freddie back to the fold. Dodd recounts that, in a past life, they had worked together in Paris sending balloons across a Prussian blockade. Dodd gives Freddie an ultimatum: devote himself to the Cause for life, or leave and never return. As Freddie suggests that they may meet again in the next life, Dodd says that if they do, it will be as sworn enemies. Dodd sings "On a Slow Boat to China" as Freddie weeps. Freddie leaves and picks up a woman at a pub, repeating questions from his first processing session as he is having sex with her.

On a beach, Freddie curls up to a crude sand sculpture of a woman he and his Navy comrades sculpted during the war.

== Cast ==
- Joaquin Phoenix as Freddie Quell
- Philip Seymour Hoffman as Lancaster Dodd
- Amy Adams as Peggy Dodd
- Laura Dern as Helen Sullivan
- Ambyr Childers as Elizabeth Dodd
- Rami Malek as Clark Massey
- Jesse Plemons as Val Dodd
- Kevin J. O'Connor as Bill William
- Christopher Evan Welch as John More
- Madisen Beaty as Doris Solstad
- Lena Endre as Mrs. Solstad
- Amy Ferguson as Martha, the salesgirl
- Patty McCormack as Mildred Drummond
- Jillian Bell as Susan Gregory
- Joshua Close as Wayne Gregory
- Fiona Dourif as Dancer
- David Warshofsky as Philadelphia police
- Steven Wiig as Philadelphia follower
- W. Earl Brown as Fighting businessman

== Production ==
=== Writing ===
It was first reported in December 2009 that Paul Thomas Anderson had been working on a script about the founder of a new religious organization (described as being similar to Scientology) played by Philip Seymour Hoffman. An associate of Anderson stated that the idea for the film had been in Anderson's head for about twelve years. The idea for the film came to him after reading a quote stating that periods after wars are productive times for spiritual movements to start.

Unsure of the direction the script would take, Anderson began writing The Master as a collection of disparate scenes, rather than one coherent outline. He combined unused scenes from early drafts of There Will Be Blood, elements from the life stories of John Steinbeck and L. Ron Hubbard and from the novel V. by Thomas Pynchon, and stories Jason Robards had told him on the set of Magnolia about his drinking days in the U.S. Navy during World War II (including the draining of ethanol from a torpedo). Anderson conducted research about Dianetics and its early followers. While writing, Anderson sought Hoffman's feedback on the script, with Hoffman suggesting the film focus more on Freddie's story than Lancaster's. After the film was dropped by Universal and failed to pick up a distributor, Anderson did several months of rewrites.

=== Casting ===
Anderson has stated that he wanted Hoffman to play Lancaster Dodd from the film's inception, and that he also had Joaquin Phoenix in mind for the part of Freddie Quell. Jeremy Renner and James Franco were each rumored to play Freddie before Phoenix was officially attached. This was Phoenix's first screen appearance since the 2010 film I'm Still Here, a multi-year performance art mockumentary project that Phoenix attributed as a factor in limiting the roles he was subsequently offered. Reese Witherspoon was reportedly offered the role of Peggy Dodd, but Amy Adams was later cast. For the role of Dodd's daughter, Amanda Seyfried, Emma Stone, and Deborah Ann Woll were all considered, with the role eventually going to Ambyr Childers.

=== Filming ===
Filming was to begin in August 2010, with Renner starring opposite Hoffman, but was postponed indefinitely in September 2010. In May 2011, after securing financing, the film was given the green light and filming began in early June 2011 in Vallejo and Sacramento. Shooting took place on Mare Island for a month using the wing of an old hospital and an empty admiral's mansion for some scenes. Franklin Delano Roosevelt's presidential yacht, the USS Potomac, was used for shooting shipboard scenes. In late June 2011, filming took place at Hillside Elementary School in Berkeley.

The film was shot on 65 mm film using the Panavision System 65 camera. It was the first fiction film to be shot in 65 mm since Kenneth Branagh's Hamlet in 1996. Mihai Mălaimare Jr. served as cinematographer, making The Master Anderson's first film without cinematographer Robert Elswit. The film crew used three 65 mm Panavision cameras throughout filming, and at times had an assistant from Panavision on set to help with the cameras' technical issues. Originally, Anderson and Mălaimare planned to shoot mainly portraits in 65 mm, which constituted 20 percent of the film, but ultimately 85 percent of the film was shot in 65 mm. The remainder of the film was shot on 35mm using Panavision Millennium XL2s cameras, often used for scenes that required a "dirtier" look. In order to maintain a consistent aspect ratio, the 65 mm footage was cropped from 2.20:1 to 1.85:1 to match the 35 mm footage, at the sacrifice of some image area. Most of the film stocks used were Kodak Vision3 50D Color Negative Film 5203 and Kodak Vision3 200T Color Negative Film 5213 with a few scenes also done with Kodak Vision3 250D Color Negative Film 5207 and Kodak Vision3 500T 5219. Because Anderson prefers working with film, he bypassed the use of a digital intermediate, instead color grading with the use of a photochemical timer.

During filming, Phoenix was allowed to improvise on set. Phoenix lost significant weight for the role and came up with Freddie's awkward gait. Anderson compared Phoenix's commitment to that of Daniel Day-Lewis for his level of concentration, saying that Phoenix got into character and stayed there for three months. Anderson considered the dynamic between Hoffman and Phoenix to be central to the film, likening it to the rivalry and differences in style and temperament between tennis players John McEnroe and Björn Borg or Ivan Lendl, with Hoffman playing the more controlled and driven approach of Borg or Lendl. Adams stated that Anderson would have her appear on set for scenes she was not scheduled to appear in to make her presence felt, and at times she didn't know whether the camera was on her.

=== Music ===
Jonny Greenwood of Radiohead composed the score for the film. This was the second time Greenwood scored an Anderson film, the first being 2007's There Will Be Blood.

The official soundtrack was released through Nonesuch Records, and comprises eleven compositions by Greenwood along with four recordings from the film's era. Performers include the London Contemporary Orchestra and Ella Fitzgerald, among others. The track "Don't Sit Under the Apple Tree (with Anyone Else but Me)" is presented as performed in the film by actress Madisen Beaty. The Weinstein Company also released a more comprehensive score on their website as part of the film's promotion, featuring alternate versions of the tracks.

== Release ==
=== Distribution ===
The Master was initially set up with Universal, but, like The Weinstein Company, they eventually passed on the project because of problems with the script. Universal was mainly concerned with the excessive budget of about $35 million. It was later reported that River Road was in serious talks to fully finance the film. In February 2011, it was reported that Megan Ellison, daughter of billionaire Larry Ellison, would finance The Master and Anderson's adaptation of the novel Inherent Vice under her new production company Annapurna Pictures. Harvey Weinstein later picked up the worldwide rights to the film in May 2011.

=== Marketing ===
The first teaser poster for the film appeared in May 2011 at the Cannes Film Festival with the title Untitled Paul Thomas Anderson Project. A second promo poster for the film appeared in November 2011 at the American Film Market with the same title. On May 21, 2012, a teaser trailer featuring Joaquin Phoenix was released online and several minutes of footage from the film were shown at the 2012 Cannes Film Festival. A second teaser trailer was released on June 19, 2012, which featured Phoenix as well as Philip Seymour Hoffman and Amy Adams. On July 19, 2012, a theatrical trailer was released online by The Weinstein Company. The film was given an R rating in the United States by the Motion Picture Association of America.

=== 70 mm screenings ===
The film was the first in 16 years to be predominantly shot in 65 mm (using Panavision System 65 cameras), a camera negative format that is subsequently projected in 70 mm (the extra 5 mm are added to the projection prints to accommodate the audio tracks). On August 3, 2012, more than a month before its first official screening at the Venice Film Festival, The Master was shown in a "surprise screening" at the American Cinematheque in 70 mm. It was announced that there would be a special screening just after a screening of a new remastered version of Stanley Kubrick's The Shining. Following the credits of The Shining, it was announced that the special screening was The Master. The film was shown with no opening titles (except for the title of the movie) or closing credits. The Weinstein Company continued advance screenings of the film in 70 mm in New York City, Los Angeles, London, Chicago, San Francisco, Seattle, Boston, Washington, D.C., and Austin. Although this was done because there was strong consideration that The Master was unlikely to be shown in the format during its commercial run, the film was eventually displayed during its run in 70 mm in most cinemas that carried the film and could still project that format.

=== Home media ===
The film was released on DVD and Blu-ray on February 26, 2013, in the US, and March 11 in the UK. The release features "Back Beyond", a twenty-minute montage of deleted footage edited by Paul Thomas Anderson and set to Jonny Greenwood's original score. It also includes the 1946 John Huston documentary Let There Be Light, a source which Anderson reportedly found very influential in his creation of the film.

== Reception ==
=== Box office ===
The Master grossed $242,127 at five theaters during its opening day on September 14, 2012, setting a single-day record for an art house film. Overall the film made $736,311 from five theaters for a per-theater average of $147,262, setting a record for the highest average for a live-action film. During its first week nationwide, the film grossed $4.4 million in 788 theaters. Worldwide, its theatrical run earned $29,044,338, about 80% of its production budget of $37,500,000.

=== Critical response ===
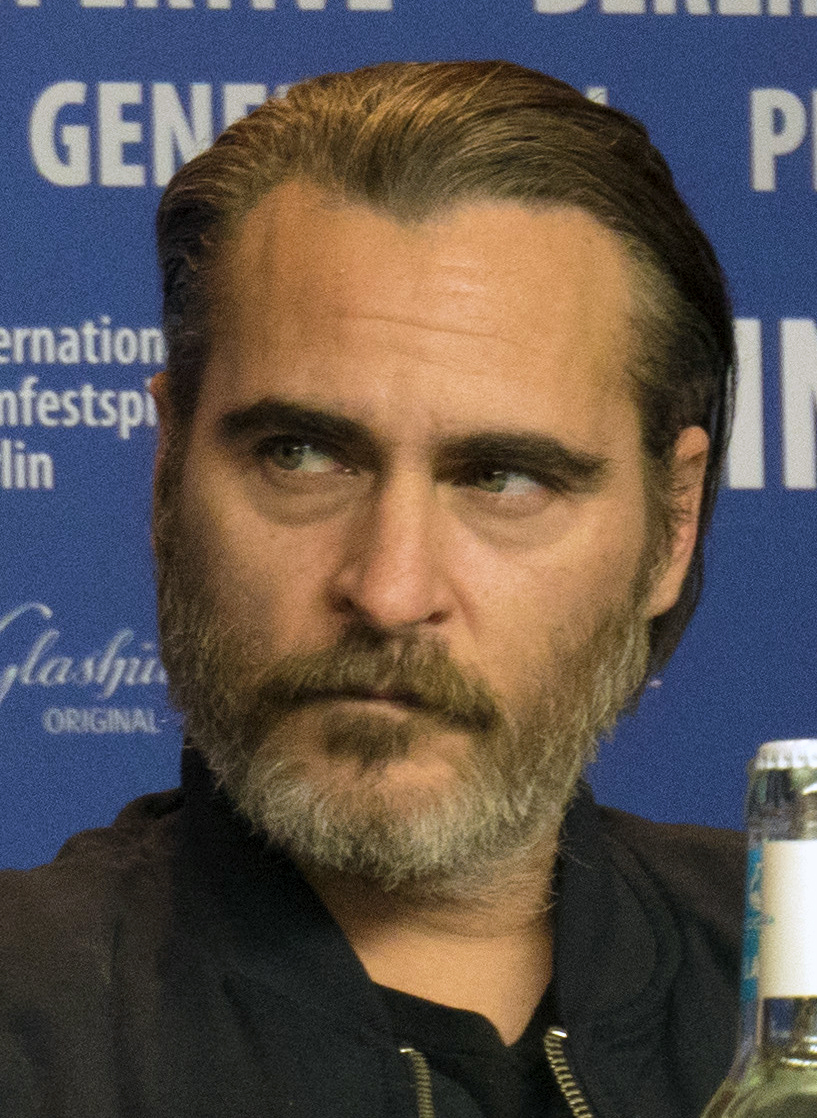
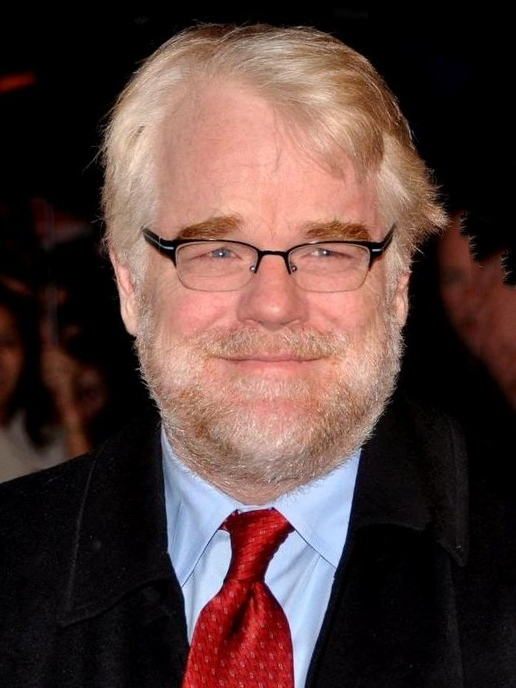
Both Phoenix and Hoffman’s performances were lauded by critics, and won them the Volpi Cup for Best Actor. They were both nominated for Academy Awards for their performances, which were considered to be among their finest.

On review aggregator Rotten Tomatoes, The Master has an approval rating of 85% based on 257 reviews. The website's critical consensus reads, "Smart and solidly engrossing, The Master extends Paul Thomas Anderson's winning streak of challenging films for serious audiences." On Metacritic, the film has a weighted average score of 86 out of 100, based on 43 critics, indicating "universal acclaim".

Kenneth Turan of the Los Angeles Times, in praising Anderson's directing and Phoenix's performance, wrote: "Phoenix, known for immersing himself in Oscar-nominated roles in Gladiator and Walk the Line, makes Quell frighteningly believable." About the film itself, he stated: "The Master takes some getting used to. This is a superbly crafted film that's at times intentionally opaque, as if its creator didn't want us to see all the way into its heart of darkness." Lisa Schwarzbaum of Entertainment Weekly gave the film a perfect "A" grade, stating: "It's also one of the great movies of the year - an ambitious, challenging, and creatively hot-blooded, but cool-toned, project that picks seriously at knotty ideas about American personality, success, rootlessness, master-disciple dynamics, and father-son mutually assured destruction."

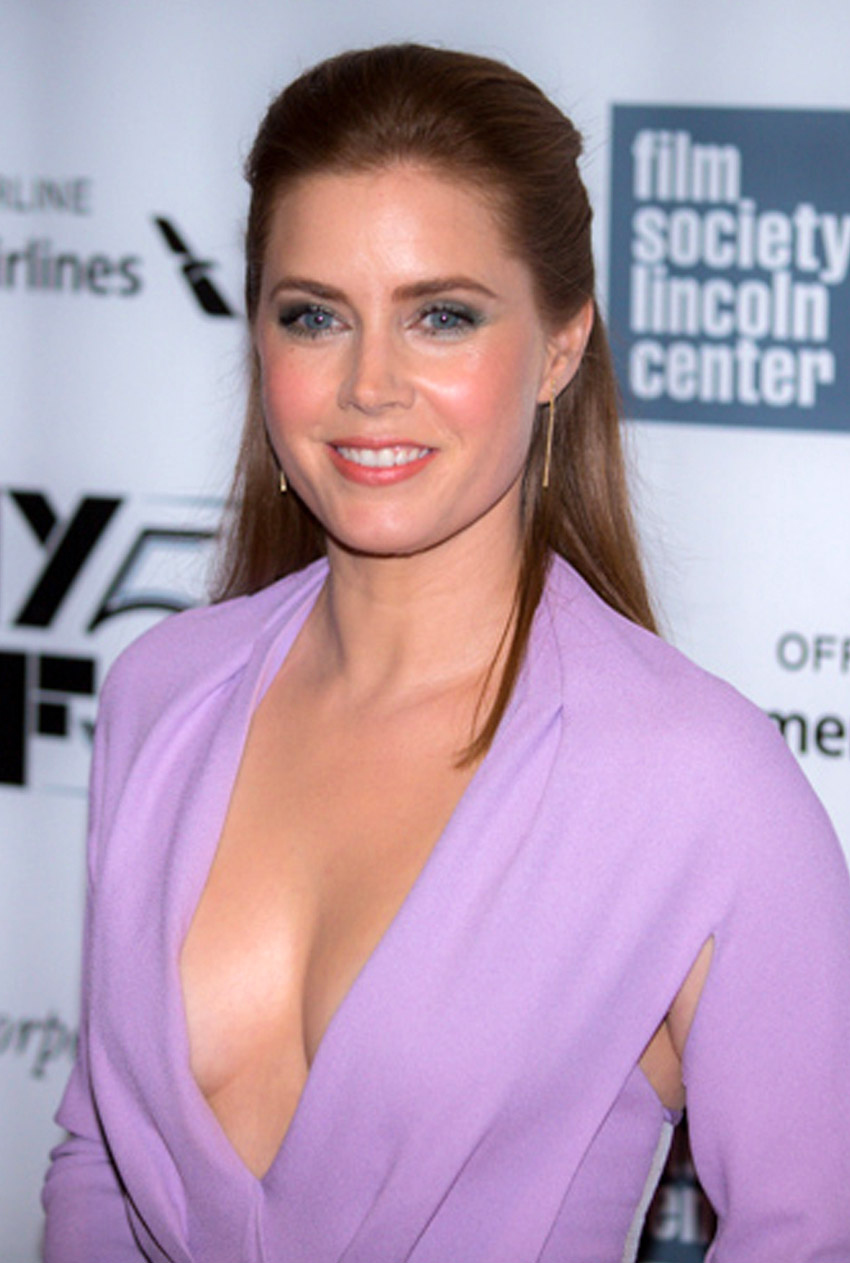
Adams was also praised by critics and received her fourth Academy Award nomination for her performance.

Peter Rainer of The Christian Science Monitor wrote that "the performances by Phoenix and Hoffman are studies in contrast. Phoenix carries himself with a jagged, lurching, simian-like grace, while Hoffman gives Dodd a calm deliberateness. Both actors have rarely been better in the movies. The real Master class here is about acting – and that includes just about everybody else in the film, especially Adams, whose twinkly girl-next-door quality is used here to fine subversive effect." A. O. Scott of The New York Times wrote: "It is a movie about the lure and folly of greatness that comes as close as anything I've seen recently to being a great movie. There will be skeptics, but the cult is already forming. Count me in." Scott Tobias of The A.V. Club, giving the film an "A" grade, wrote: "It's a feisty, contentious, deliberately misshapen film, designed to challenge and frustrate audiences looking for a clean resolution. Just because it's over doesn't mean it's settled." Peter Travers of Rolling Stone gave the film four stars out of four, praising Anderson's directing: "The Master, the sixth film from the 42-year-old writer-director, affirms his position as the foremost filmmaking talent of his generation. Anderson is a rock star, the artist who knows no limits." About the film itself, he wrote: "Written, directed, acted, shot, edited, and scored with a bracing vibrancy that restores your faith in film as an art form, The Master is nirvana for movie lovers. Anderson mixes sounds and images into a dark, dazzling music that is all his own." He would later call the film the Best Film of 2012.

Todd McCarthy of The Hollywood Reporter wrote: "In a film overflowing with qualities, but also brimming with puzzlements, two things stand out: the extraordinary command of cinematic technique, which alone is nearly enough to keep a connoisseur on the edge of his seat the entire time, and the tremendous portrayals by Joaquin Phoenix and Philip Seymour Hoffman of two entirely antithetical men, one an unlettered drifter without a clue, the other an intellectual charlatan who claims to have all the answers. They become greatly important to each other and yet, in the end, have an oddly negligible mutual effect. The magisterial style, eerie mood and forbidding central characters echo Anderson's previous film, There Will Be Blood, a kinship furthered by another bold and discordant score by Jonny Greenwood." Justin Chang of Variety magazine wrote: "The writer-director's typically eccentric sixth feature is a sustained immersion in a series of hypnotic moods and longueurs, an imposing picture that thrillingly and sometimes maddeningly refuses to conform to expectations." James Berardinelli of ReelViews gave the film three stars out of four and praised Phoenix's performance, stating: "Gaunt, sick-looking, with stooped shoulders and a shambling gait, Phoenix buries himself in Freddie's persona and there's never a moment when we disbelieve him." He added: "Yet, for all of The Master's laudable elements, it falls short of greatness for one simple reason: the storytelling is unspectacular."

Even less enthusiastic was Roger Ebert of the Chicago Sun-Times, who gave the film two-and-a-half stars out of a possible four. He wrote that it was "fabulously well-acted and crafted, but when I reach for it, my hand closes on air. It has rich material and isn't clear what it thinks about it. It has two performances of Oscar caliber, but do they connect?" However, Ebert later included The Master as an honorable mention on his list of the best films of 2012, naming it alongside nine other titles he granted his Grand Jury Prize that year. Calum Marsh of Slant Magazine gave the film two stars out of four, stating: "The Master is Paul Thomas Anderson with the edges sanded off, the best bits shorn down to nubs." Rex Reed of the New York Observer gave the film a negative review, writing: "Call The Master whatever you want, but lobotomized catatonia from what I call the New Hacks can never take the place of well-made narrative films about real people that tell profound stories for a broader and more sophisticated audience. Fads come and go, but, as Walter Kerr used to say, 'I'll yell tripe whenever tripe is served.'" Reed also made mention of how Phoenix's performance and the supporting characters' lack of development further hurt the film.

On Phoenix's performance, Kent Jones of Film Comment noted, "Freddie is not so much played as nuzzled, and jerked into being by Joaquin Phoenix. I'm Still Here aside, Phoenix's Freddie seems like genuinely damaged goods. He and his director feel their way into this man-in-a-bind from the inside out, and they establish his estrangement from others in those opening scenes through awkward smiles and out-of-sync body language alone". "As always with Anderson," Jones continued, "the character opposition borders on the schematic, and the structure threatens to come apart at the seams. But the courting of danger is exactly what makes his films so exciting, this new film most of all. I don't think he has ever done a better job of resolving his story, perhaps because he has come to terms with the irresolution within and between his characters." Scott, of The New York Times, pointed out that Phoenix used "sly, manic ferocity" to portray Freddie as "an alcoholic wreck".

Emma Dibdin of Total Film gave The Master 5 stars out of 5, concluding that it "is a breath-taking, singular, technically audacious film, white-hot with emotion, and boasting a few scenes so individually powerful that they'll stay with you like a physical presence for days".

The Master was placed #1 in both the critics poll of the best films of 2012 by Sight and Sound, and by The Village Voice on its annual film poll. The film also ranked second by both Film Comment and Indiewire on their year-end film critics polls, following Holy Motors.

The Master was later placed #1 on The A.V. Club's list of the best films of the 2010s up until April 2015, and was named as one of the top 50 films of the decade so far by The Guardian.

Anderson considers it his favorite of the films he has made; in an interview with the Los Angeles Times, he said:

For sure. I think that won't change. The amount of emotion I put into it and they put into it—they being Phil [Seymour Hoffman], Joaquin [Phoenix], and Amy [Adams]. I'm not sure it's entirely successful. But that's fine with me. It feels right. It feels unique to me. I really hope it will be something people can revisit and enjoy in a way that equals my pride in it. And pride can be a dangerous thing, and I'm not being very quiet about my pride in saying all this. But I just feel really proud of it. And of course, there's a particular sentimentality attached to it for a number of personal reasons. It's all wrapped up.

In May 2025, ScreenCrush ranked the film at number 20 on its list of "The 20 Best Movies of the Last 20 Years," with Matt Singer writing "On a recent rewatch, I felt like The Master is as much a twisted love story as Anderson’s Phantom Thread, and was mostly struck with the poignance of its story about a man who claims he can erase trauma suffered in past lives, who cannot even help his most fervent follower deal with the trauma he has experienced in this life." In June 2025, the film ranked number 42 on The New York Times' list of "The 100 Best Movies of the 21st Century" and number 87 on the "Readers' Choice" edition of the list. In July 2025, it ranked number 44 on Rolling Stone's list of "The 100 Best Movies of the 21st Century."

=== Top ten lists ===
The Master was listed on many critics' top ten lists.

- 1st – Peter Travers, Rolling Stone
- 1st – The A.V. Club
- 1st – Nathan Rabin, The A.V. Club
- 1st – Scott Tobias, The A.V. Club
- 1st – Noel Murray, The A.V. Club
- 1st – Karina Longworth, Village Voice
- 1st – Glenn Kenny, MSN Movies
- 1st – Wesley Morris, Boston Globe
- 1st – Peter Rainer, Christian Science Monitor
- 1st – Peter Bradshaw, The Guardian
- 1st – Marc Mahon, The Oregonian
- 1st – Brian Tallerico, Hollywood Chicago
- 1st – Rafer Guzmán, Newsday
- 1st – Total Film
- 2nd – Joe Neumaier, New York Daily News
- 2nd – Scott Foundas, The Village Voice
- 2nd – Jake Coyle, Associated Press
- 3rd – David Ansen, The Village Voice
- 3rd – Lisa Schwarzbaum, Entertainment Weekly
- 3rd – Eric Kohn, IndieWire
- 3rd – Alison Willmore & Keith Phipps, The A.V. Club
- 3rd – Richard Brody, The New Yorker
- 4th – Dana Stevens, Slate
- 4th – Michael Phillips, Chicago Tribune
- 5th – A.O. Scott, The New York Times
- 5th – Mary Pols, Time
- 5th – Sean Axmaker, MSN Movies
- 6th – Marlow Stern, The Daily Beast
- 6th – Christy Lemire, Associated Press
- 6th – Todd McCarthy, The Hollywood Reporter
- 6th – Kevin Jagernauth, Indiewire
- 6th – Patrick McDonald, Hollywood Chicago
- 6th – Christopher Orr, The Atlantic
- 7th – David Germain, Associated Press
- 7th – Tasha Robinson, The A.V. Club
- 8th – J. Hoberman, Artforum
- 10th – Sam Adams, The A.V. Club
- Top 10 (listed alphabetically) – Manohla Dargis, The New York Times
- Top 10 (listed alphabetically) – Joe Morgenstern, The Wall Street Journal
- Top 10 (listed alphabetically) – Bob Mondello, NPR
- Top 10 (ranked alphabetically) – David Denby, The New Yorker
- Top 10 (ranked alphabetically) – Phillip French, The Observer
- Top 10 (ranked alphabetically) – Stephen Whitty, The Star-Ledger
- Top 10 (ranked alphabetically) – Joe Williams, St. Louis Post-Dispatch

== Accolades ==
The film won the Silver Lion for Best Director (Paul Thomas Anderson) and the Volpi Cup for Best Actor (given to both Joaquin Phoenix and Philip Seymour Hoffman) at the 69th Venice International Film Festival. However, the festival's jury originally intended to give the film the top Golden Lion prize for Best Film; the prize was removed and awarded to Pietà instead, owing to a new rule that prohibited the award of acting and directing honors to the same film that won the Golden Lion prize. A similar incident was rumored to have occurred at the festival in 2008, when Darren Aronofsky's The Wrestler was to be awarded both the Golden Lion and the Volpi Cup for Mickey Rourke's performance. The film received the former, with the latter being awarded to Silvio Orlando for his work in Giovanna's Father. When asked about the last-minute shake-up over the award, Anderson replied: "I'm thrilled with whatever they want to hand over. I heard some of the scuttlebutt recently, but I'm just thrilled with what they hand over. And that's all." In 2021, members of Writers Guild of America West (WGAW) and Writers Guild of America, East (WGAE) voted its screenplay 84th in WGA’s 101 Greatest Screenplays of the 21st Century (so far).

== Themes and interpretations ==
There have been several interpretations of what The Master is really about. Some have viewed it as an existential tale of post-war America, while others have viewed it as a depiction of the birth of Scientology.

Others have argued that the film is partly about acting; Richard Brody of the New Yorker observed that, "Similarly, it's perhaps notable that Phoenix's performance seems to represent the tormented, physical acting styles of the latter half of the twentieth century (the Brandos, the Deans, the Clifts), whereas Hoffman's acting seems to hearken back to the controlled, elusive manner of the previous half (many have described his turn as "Wellesian"). In these acting styles, we see a miniature version of the journey of American society during this period—and, specifically, American maleness." Still other arguments regarding the film's main theme hold that it is about humanity, and man's struggle to cope with his animalistic nature. Glenn Kenny of MSN Movies wrote that the film is "Less about [Scientology's] specific set of beliefs than about how humans rely on belief systems in general to try and lift themselves out of an elemental rage, and to assert, yes, that man is not an animal."

Numerous reviewers commented on the homoerotic subtext of the film. Film Comment noted the bonding and repelling between the two men, "two edges of the split saber, play out in public and in private, in 'audits' and intimate exchanges over Freddie's alcoholic concoctions". The Guardian saw "Quell's chaos and Dodd's charlatanism" locked "in a dance of death – erotic and homoerotic". Salon commented that the film contains a "not-too-veiled suggestion that Dodd's paternal yearnings for Freddie are complicated by other desires".

=== Comparisons with Scientology ===
Upon the release of the script, comparisons between the Cause and Scientology were quickly made. The press noted Hoffman's physical resemblance to Scientology founder L. Ron Hubbard (1911–1986), who served in the U.S. Navy in World War II, and, after his release from the hospital, founded the belief system in 1950, the same year as the religion in the script. The film ends in England, at roughly the same time Saint Hill Manor became Hubbard's residence and the first Scientology "org". Also, the film's references to the need of an "able-bodied seaman" and the reference to Fred being aberrant are both terms used by Scientologists in the administrative dictionary.

The production company officially denied that the film was loosely based on Hubbard, with producer JoAnne Sellar also denying any connection to Hubbard, stating: "It's a World War II drama. It's about a drifter after World War II." Harvey Weinstein also denied that the film was about Scientology: "Paul says to me the movie is about a journey for soldiers after World War II ... one of the things that happens to this soldier is he goes to a cult." Anderson has stated that he has "always thought Hubbard was a great character, so interesting and larger than life, and kind of impossible to ignore", and he acknowledges that Lancaster Dodd was inspired by Hubbard, and that he should have known that is what people would latch onto, stating: "I didn't want it to be a biography. It's not the L. Ron Hubbard story."

Several websites suggested that "important Hollywood Scientologists" objected to the project because they feared it might reveal too much about the faith, and others even speculated that the Church of Scientology had enough power to stop Universal from green-lighting the film. However, none of the production crew had been contacted by representatives of Scientology. When Karin Pouw, a spokeswoman for the Church of Scientology, was asked if the church had any concerns about the film, she stated, "We have not seen the film, so can't say one way or another" and that the church knew about the film only from what it read in the press. According to Anderson, at no point did the church make any direct or indirect inquiries about the project or otherwise try to inhibit its progress, and that while they were making the film, Scientology was the least of their problems.

In May 2012, Anderson screened the film for his friend, actor Tom Cruise, an outspoken Scientologist, who had some issues with parts of the film. Cruise had previously starred in Anderson's third film Magnolia. Officials of the Church of Scientology, who reportedly heard from Cruise, "hit the roof" when they learned of a scene which suggested that the belief system was a product of the leader's imagination. The scene with which Cruise had issues involves Dodd's son telling Quell that Dodd is just making it up as he goes along. They took issue not only with this statement, but with the way it supposedly paralleled L. Ron Hubbard Jr.'s conflict with his own father. While church members objected to other scenes, Anderson did not excise any of them from the film. He stated that Cruise "did see the film. It's something between us. Everything is fine, though."
