= Phantom Thread =

2017 film by Paul Thomas Anderson

- Theatrical release poster
- Directed by: Paul Thomas Anderson
- Written by: Paul Thomas Anderson
- Produced by: JoAnne Sellar; Paul Thomas Anderson; Megan Ellison; Daniel Lupi
- Starring: Daniel Day-Lewis; Lesley Manville; Vicky Krieps
- Cinematography: Paul Thomas Anderson
- Edited by: Dylan Tichenor
- Music by: Jonny Greenwood
- Production companies: Focus Features; Annapurna Pictures; Ghoulardi Film Company; Perfect World Pictures
- Distributed by: Focus Features (United States); Universal Pictures (international)
- Release dates: December 11, 2017 (Walter Reade Theater); December 25, 2017 (United States)
- Running time: 130 minutes
- Country: United States
- Language: English
- Budget: $35 million
- Box office: $53.2 million

Phantom Thread is a 2017 American psychological period drama film written, shot and directed by Paul Thomas Anderson. It stars Daniel Day-Lewis, Vicky Krieps, and Lesley Manville, and follows an haute couture dressmaker in 1950s London who takes a young waitress as his muse. It is Anderson's first film shot outside the United States, with principal photography beginning in January 2017 in Lythe, England. It is also Anderson's second collaboration with Day-Lewis, after There Will Be Blood (2007), and his fourth collaboration with composer Jonny Greenwood.

Phantom Thread premiered in New York City on December 11, 2017, and was theatrically released in the United States two weeks later. It received acclaim for its acting, screenplay, direction, musical score, costume design, and production values. The National Board of Review chose it as one of the top ten films of 2017, and it is widely considered one of the best films of the 2010s and the 21st century.

At the 90th Academy Awards, the film was nominated for Best Picture, Best Director, Best Actor (Day-Lewis), Best Supporting Actress (Manville), and Best Original Score; it won for Best Costume Design. It also earned four nominations at the 71st British Academy Film Awards, winning for Best Costume Design, and received two Golden Globe nominations.

== Plot ==
In 1954 London, fashion designer Reynolds Woodcock creates dresses for members of high society, including royalty. His clients view him as a genius whose creations enable them to become their best selves, but his creativity and charm are matched by his obsessive and controlling personality. Cyril, his sister, manages his fashion house's day-to-day operations and tries to protect him from anything that might distract him from his work. The superstitious Reynolds is haunted by their mother's death and often stitches hidden messages into the linings of the dresses he makes.

After designing a new gown for a revered client, Lady Harding, Reynolds visits a restaurant near his country house and meets a foreign waitress, Alma Elson. She accepts his invitation to dinner. Their relationship blossoms, and she moves in with him, becoming his model, muse, and lover. Cyril initially mistrusts and dominates Alma, but comes to respect her willfulness and determination.

At first, Alma enjoys being part of Reynolds's work, but he proves aloof, hard to please, and finicky; as a result, they start to bicker. When Alma tries to show her love for Reynolds by surprising him with a romantic dinner, he lashes out, calling it an "ambush", questioning her motives, and suggesting that she go back to where she came from. Alma retaliates by poisoning his tea with wild mushrooms gathered outside the country house. As he readies a wedding gown for a Belgian princess, Reynolds collapses, damaging the dress and forcing his staff to work all night to repair it. He becomes gravely ill and has hallucinations of his mother. Alma stays by his side, nursing him back to health.

After Reynolds recovers, he tells Alma that a house that does not change "is a dead house" and asks her to marry him. Taken aback, she hesitates, but then accepts. After a honeymoon in Switzerland, Reynolds and Alma start bickering again as Reynolds's domineering personality reasserts itself. Cyril tells Reynolds that Lady Harding is now a client at a rival fashion house and suggests that his classic, conservative designs may be going out of style. Reynolds blames Alma for upending his routines, saying she doesn't fit in and has turned Cyril and him against each other. Alma overhears him.

At the country house, Alma makes Reynolds an omelet poisoned with the same mushrooms as before. Reynolds suspects the poisoning, but takes a bite, watching Alma's reaction. As he chews, she informs him that she wants him weak and vulnerable, then strong again after she has taken care of him. Reynolds ostentatiously swallows the bite and tells her to kiss him before he is sick. As he lies ill again, Alma imagines their future with children, a rich social life, and a bigger role for her in the dressmaking business. She acknowledges that while there are challenges ahead, their love and their complementary needs can overcome them.

== Cast ==
- Daniel Day-Lewis as Reynolds Woodcock
- Vicky Krieps as Alma Elson
- Lesley Manville as Cyril Woodcock
- Brian Gleeson as Dr. Robert Hardy
- Harriet Sansom Harris as Barbara Rose
- Gina McKee as Countess Henrietta Harding
- Camilla Rutherford as Johanna
- George Glasgow as Nigel Cheddar-Goode
- Eric Sigmundsson as Cal Rose
- Lujza Richter as Princess Mona Braganza
- Julia Davis as Lady Baltimore
- Nicholas Mander as Lord Baltimore
- Philip Franks as Peter Martin
- Phyllis MacMahon as Tippy
- Silas Carson as Rubio Gurrerro
- Richard Graham as George Riley
- Jane Perry as Mrs. Vaughan
- Ian Harrod as The Registrar

== Production ==
Paul Thomas Anderson became interested in the fashion industry after reading about designer Cristóbal Balenciaga. Reynolds Woodcock's obsessive fastidiousness is loosely inspired by English-American fashion designer Charles James. Daniel Day-Lewis, a method actor, spent a year learning dressmaking from Marc Happel in preparation for the role. He gained enough skill to enable him to recreate an iconic Balenciaga dress.

=== Filming ===
Principal photography began in late January 2017 in Lythe, England, United Kingdom, with a number of other locations in the North York Moors, including Robin Hood's Bay and Staithes. Filming also took place at Owlpen Manor in the Cotswolds and in the London neighbourhood of Fitzrovia, in Fitzroy Square, in Grafton Mews, at the Grandhotel Giessbach, Brienz, Switzerland, Lake Brienz, and Brienzer Rothorn. The New Year's Eve party was filmed at the Blackpool Tower ballroom with approximately 500 supporting artistes. During filming, the crew moved into 3 Fitzroy Square, which functioned as accommodation and storage in addition to set. Day-Lewis, who, in keeping with his method acting approach, stayed in character throughout the shoot, has described it as an "awful" experience, remarking "We were living on top of each other. There was no space. That entire house was like a termite nest". Woodcock drives a maroon Bristol 405 in the film.

=== Cinematography ===
While Robert Elswit had served as cinematographer for most of Anderson's previous films, Anderson ultimately served as his own cinematographer for Phantom Thread. No cinematographer is listed in the film's credits, but Michael Bauman, who previously worked as Anderson and Elswit's gaffer, was credited as the "lighting cameraman". Anderson and Bauman pushed their 35 mm film stock and filled its frames with "theatrical haze" to "dirty up" their look; according to Bauman, "One of the first things [Paul] said was, 'Look, this cannot look like The Crown.' That was a big thing. When people think of a period movie it becomes this beautifully polished, amazingly photographed—I mean, The Crown looks beautiful—but super clean, gorgeous light, and he was clear it couldn't look like that." In 2020, Elswit publicly criticized Anderson's cinematography, saying in an interview, "He just threw a lot of smoke in the room. Which he never would let me do, he never let me smoke a set... I enjoyed the film [but] if I shot that movie I would not be happy with it ending up looking like it looked, that's all".

=== Soundtrack ===
Jonny Greenwood composed the score for Phantom Thread, having previously worked with Anderson on the soundtracks for There Will Be Blood (2007), The Master (2012), and Inherent Vice (2014). It was nominated for the Academy Award for Best Original Score, Greenwood's first Academy Award nomination. The soundtrack features prominently in the film, with nearly ninety minutes of music during the film's 130-minute runtime.

== Reception ==
=== Box office ===
Phantom Thread grossed $21.2 million in the United States and Canada and $32 million in other territories, for a worldwide total of $53.2 million, against a production budget of $35 million.

After three weeks in limited release, where it made $2.8 million, the film was added to 834 theaters on January 19, 2018 (for a total of 896), and grossed $3.8 million over the weekend, finishing 12th at the box office. The next weekend, after the announcement of its six Oscar nominations, and having added 125 theaters, the film grossed $2.9 million.

=== Critical response ===
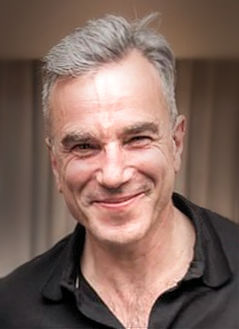
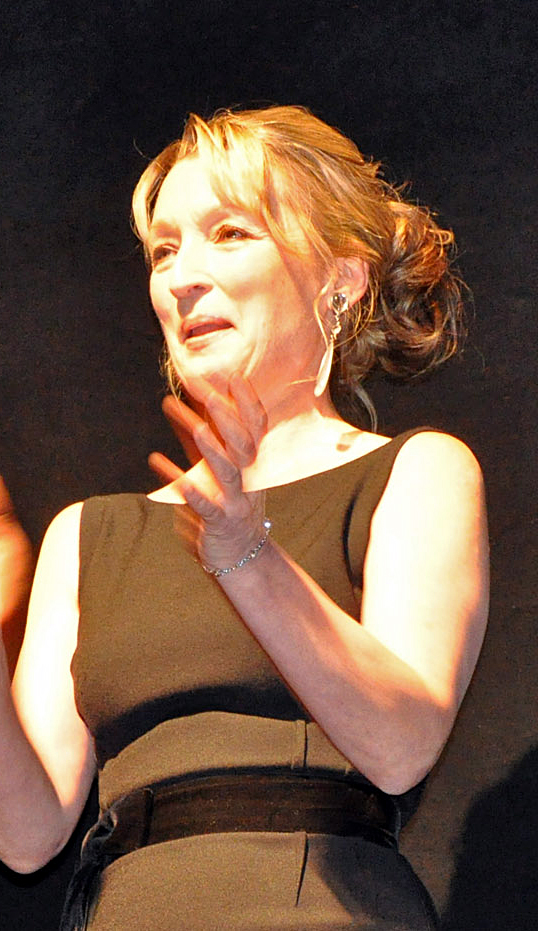
The performances of Daniel Day-Lewis and Lesley Manville garnered critical acclaim, earning them Academy Award nominations for Best Actor and Best Supporting Actress respectively.

On review aggregator Rotten Tomatoes, the film has an approval rating of 91% based on 358 reviews. The site's critics consensus reads: "Phantom Thread's finely woven narrative is filled out nicely by humor, intoxicating romantic tension, and yet another impressively committed performance from Daniel Day-Lewis." On Metacritic, the film has a weighted average score of 90 out of 100 based on 51 critics' reviews, indicating “universal acclaim”.

The A.V. Club's A.A. Dowd gave the film an A−, calling it a "charitable and even poignantly hopeful take on the subject [of being in a relationship with an artist]" and writing, "in the simple, refined timelessness of its technique, Phantom Thread is practically a love letter to classic aesthetic values—cinematic, sartorial, or otherwise". The Observer critic Mark Kermode gave the film five stars out of five, calling it "a deftly spun yarn" and praising Day-Lewis's performance, calling his role a "perfect fit [in a] beautifully realised tale of 50s haute couture".

Christy Lemire of the Los Angeles Film Critics Association placed the film second on her list of the ten best films of 2017, calling it "captivating" and "one of Paul Thomas Anderson's absolute best" and singling out Greenwood's score as "intoxicating". Michael Wood, for the London Review of Books, wrote that the film is "too wandering and awkward to be a masterpiece, but one of its virtues is that we don’t quite know what has happened, either in the story or to us, and we go on wanting to know."

In 2021, members of Writers Guild of America West (WGAW) and Writers Guild of America, East (WGAE) voted the film's screenplay 87th in WGA’s 101 Greatest Screenplays of the 21st Century (so far). In June 2025, the film ranked number 25 on The New York Times' list of "The 100 Best Movies of the 21st Century" and number 45 on the "Readers' Choice" edition of the list. In July 2025, it ranked number 35 on Rolling Stone's list of "The 100 Best Movies of the 21st Century."

=== Top ten lists ===
Phantom Thread was on many critics' top ten lists for 2017.

- 1st – Marlow Stern, The Daily Beast
- 1st – Scott Tobias & Keith Phipps, Filmspotting
- 1st – Ben Kenigsberg, RogerEbert.com
- 2nd – Sasha Stone, Awards Daily
- 2nd – Alison Willmore, BuzzFeed
- 2nd – Christy Lemire, RogerEbert.com
- 3rd – Justin Chang, Los Angeles Times
- 3rd – Glenn Kenny, RogerEbert.com
- 4th – Mark Olsen, Los Angeles Times
- 4th – Tomris Laffly, RogerEbert.com
- 4th – Michael Phillips, Chicago Tribune
- 5th – Eric Kohn, IndieWire
- 5th – Brian Tallerico, RogerEbert.com
- 5th – Tim Grierson, Screen International
- 5th – Joshua Rothkopf, Time Out New York
- 5th – A.A. Dowd & Ignatiy Vishnevetsky, The A.V. Club
- 6th – Matt Zoller Seitz, RogerEbert.com
- 6th – Richard Brody, The New Yorker
- 6th – Richard Lawson, Vanity Fair
- 6th – A. O. Scott, The New York Times
- 6th – Todd McCarthy, The Hollywood Reporter
- 7th – Lindsay Bahr, Associated Press
- 8th – Manohla Dargis, The New York Times
- 8th – Matt Singer, ScreenCrush
- 8th – Emily Yoshida, New York
- 9th – Christopher Orr, The Atlantic
- 9th – Peter Rainer, The Christian Science Monitor
- 10th – David Ehrlich, IndieWire
- 10th – David Edelstein, New York
- 10th – Peter Travers, Rolling Stone
- Top 10 (listed alphabetically) – Peter Bradshaw, The Guardian
- Top 10 (listed alphabetically) – Ty Burr, The Boston Globe
- Top 10 (listed alphabetically) – John Powers, Vogue
- Top 10 (listed alphabetically) – Dana Stevens, Slate
- Top 10 (listed alphabetically) – Joe Morgenstern, The Wall Street Journal
- Best of 2017 (listed alphabetically) – Bob Mondello, National Public Radio
