= Paul Thomas Anderson =

American filmmaker (born 1970)

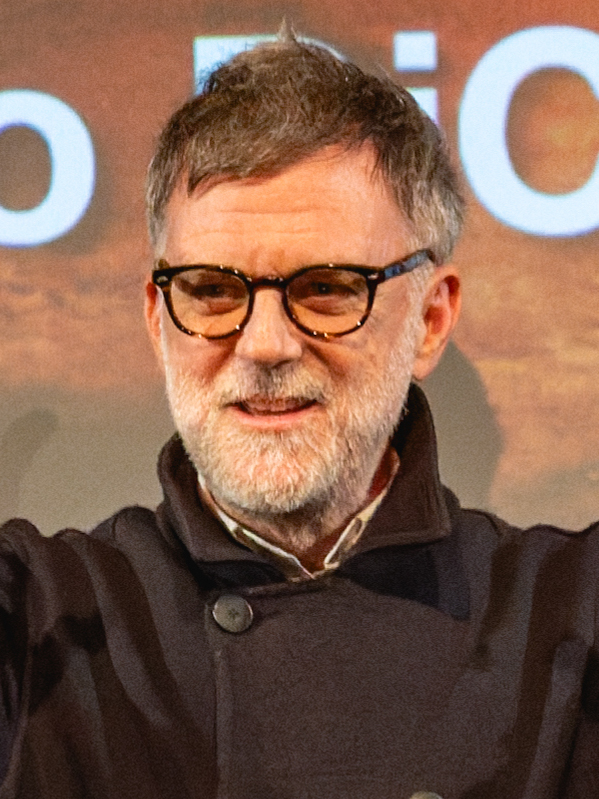
- Anderson at BFI Southbank in 2025
- Born: June 26, 1970 (age 56); Los Angeles, California, U.S.
- Occupations: Film director; screenwriter; producer; cinematographer
- Years active: 1988–present
- Organization: Founder of The Ghoulardi Film Company
- Works: Full list
- Partners: Fiona Apple (1997–2002); Maya Rudolph (Note: Since the birth of their first child, Rudolph has referred to Anderson as her husband, although they are not legally married.) (2002–present)
- Children: 4
- Father: Ernie Anderson
- Awards: Full list

Paul Thomas Anderson (born June 26, 1970), also known by his initials PTA, is an American filmmaker. Often described as one of the preeminent filmmakers of his generation, (Note: Attributed to multiple sources.) he is the recipient of numerous accolades, including three Academy Awards, three Golden Globe Awards and four BAFTAs, as well as a nomination for a Grammy Award. He is the only person to have won the Academy Award for Best Director and directorial prizes at Europe's three major film festivals: Cannes Film Festival, Venice Film Festival, and the Berlin International Film Festival. In addition to those accolades, he won the Golden Bear at the Berlin International Film Festival.

Many of Anderson's films are psychological dramas characterized by depictions of desperate characters and explorations of dysfunctional families, alienation, loneliness, and redemption, alongside a bold visual style that uses constantly moving cameras and long takes. After his directorial debut, Hard Eight (1996), Anderson had critical and commercial success with Boogie Nights (1997), and received further accolades with Magnolia (1999) and Punch-Drunk Love (2002).

There Will Be Blood (2007), Anderson's fifth film, is regarded as one of the greatest films of the 21st century. It was followed by The Master (2012) and Inherent Vice (2014), an adaptation of the 2009 novel by Thomas Pynchon. Anderson's next three films, Phantom Thread (2017), Licorice Pizza (2021) and One Battle After Another (2025) were all nominated for the Academy Awards for Best Picture and Best Director, while the last earned him wins for both and Best Adapted Screenplay and became his highest-grossing film.

Anderson is noted for his collaborations with the cinematographer Robert Elswit, the costume designer Mark Bridges, the composers Jon Brion and Jonny Greenwood, and actors including Philip Seymour Hoffman, Daniel Day-Lewis, John C. Reilly, and Joaquin Phoenix. He has directed music videos for artists including Fiona Apple, Haim, Aimee Mann, Joanna Newsom, Michael Penn, Radiohead, and the Smile. He also directed a 2015 documentary about Greenwood's album Junun, and the short music film Anima (2019) for the Radiohead singer Thom Yorke.

== Early life ==
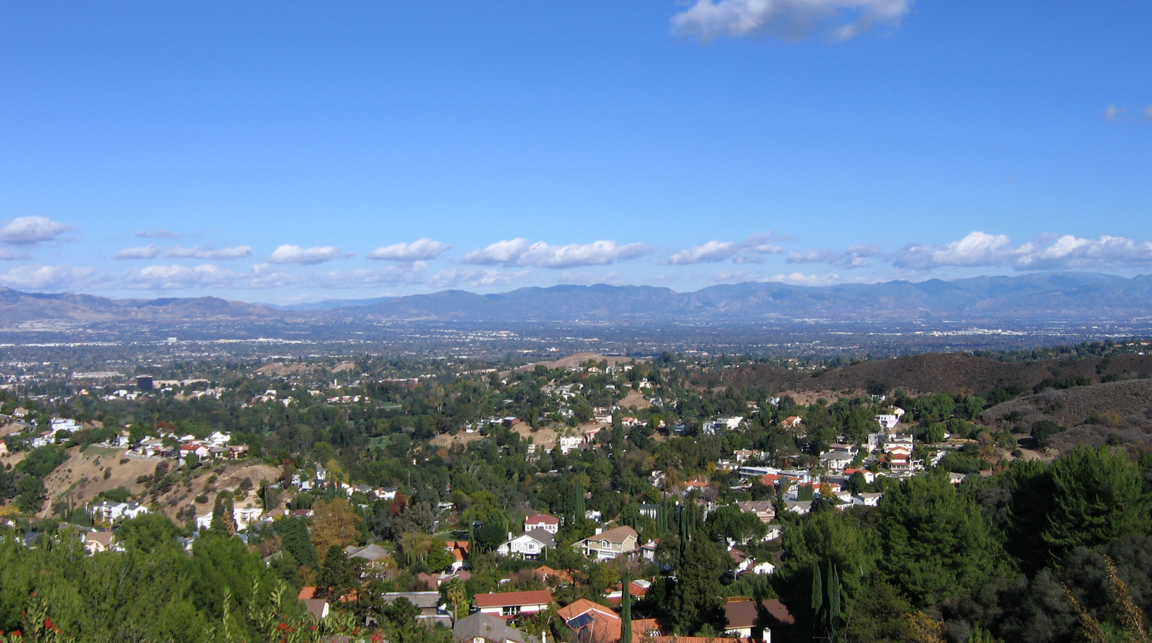
The San Fernando Valley, where Anderson was raised and set his early films Boogie Nights, Magnolia, and Punch-Drunk Love

Paul Thomas Anderson was born in Studio City, Los Angeles, on June 26, 1970, to Edwina (née Gough) and media personality Ernie Anderson. His father was the voice of ABC and played a Cleveland late-night horror host known as Ghoulardi, after which name Anderson later named his production company.

Paul Thomas Anderson has three siblings and five half-siblings from his father's first marriage. He grew up in the San Fernando Valley in a Catholic family. Anderson had a troubled relationship with his mother, and was closer with his father, who encouraged him to become a writer or director. He attended private schools including the Buckley School, John Thomas Dye School, Campbell Hall School, Cushing Academy, and Montclair College Preparatory School.

Anderson was involved in filmmaking from an early age, and never had an alternative plan to directing films. He made his first film when he was eight years old, and started making films on a Betamax videocamera his father bought in 1982. He later started using 8 mm film but realized that working with video was easier. As a teenager, he began writing and experimenting with a Bolex 16 mm camera. After years of experimenting with "standard fare", Anderson wrote and filmed his first real production as a senior at Montclair Prep, using money he earned cleaning cages at a pet store. The film was a 30-minute mockumentary about a porn star, The Dirk Diggler Story (1988), with a story inspired by John Holmes, who also inspired Boogie Nights (1997), the feature-length adaptation of The Dirk Diggler Story.

== Career ==
=== 1990s ===
Anderson attended Santa Monica College before spending two semesters as an English major at Emerson College, where he was taught by David Foster Wallace. Anderson attended New York University. For his first film school assignment he was tasked with writing a single page screenplay and Anderson decided to turn in a page from the screenplay for the film Hoffa which was written by Pulitzer Prize winner David Mamet. After receiving a C+ for the assignment Anderson realised that film school was not for him and dropped out after two days. He began his career as a production assistant on television, films, music videos, and game shows in Los Angeles and New York City. Feeling that film school turned the material into "homework or a chore", Anderson decided to make a 20-minute film as his "college".

On a budget of $10,000 (which came from gambling winnings, his girlfriend's credit card, and money his father had set aside for him for college), Anderson made Cigarettes & Coffee (1993), a short film connecting multiple storylines with a $20 bill. It screened at the 1993 Sundance Festival Shorts Program. He planned to expand it to feature-length, and was invited to the 1994 Sundance Feature Film Program. Michael Caton-Jones served as Anderson's mentor. He saw him as someone with "talent and a fully formed creative voice, but not much hands-on experience", and gave him some hard and practical lessons.

While at Sundance, Anderson had a deal with Rysher Entertainment to direct his first full-length feature film, Sydney, which was retitled Hard Eight. After he finished the film, Rysher reedited it. He had the workprint of the original cut and submitted the film to the 1996 Cannes Film Festival, where it was shown at the Un Certain Regard section. He had the version released, but only after he retitled the film, and raised the $200,000 necessary to finish it. Anderson, Philip Baker Hall, John C. Reilly, and Gwyneth Paltrow contributed to the final funding. The version that was released was Anderson's and the acclaim it received launched his career. The film follows the life of a senior gambler and a homeless man. In his review, Chicago Sun-Times critic Roger Ebert wrote, "Movies like Hard Eight remind me of what original, compelling characters the movies can sometimes give us."

Anderson worked on the script for his second film while working on the first one, and completed it in 1995. The result was his breakout film Boogie Nights (1997), which is based on his short film The Dirk Diggler Story and is set in the Golden Age of Porn. The film follows a nightclub dishwasher who becomes a pornographic actor. The script was noticed by New Line Cinema president Michael De Luca, who felt "totally gaga" reading it. It was released on October 10, 1997, and was a critical and commercial success. It revived the career of Burt Reynolds, and provided breakout roles for Mark Wahlberg and Julianne Moore. At the 70th Academy Awards, the film was nominated for three awards, including Best Supporting Actor (Reynolds), Best Supporting Actress (Moore), and Best Original Screenplay.

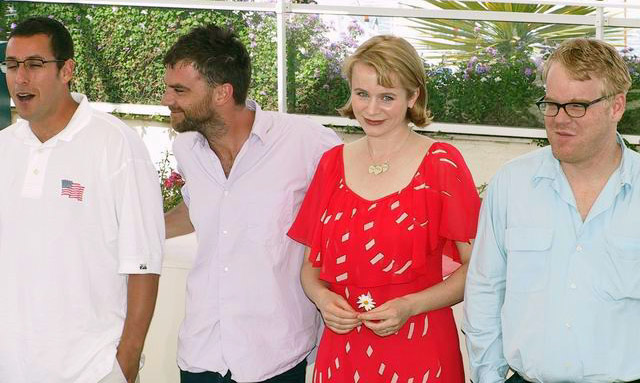
Adam Sandler, Anderson, Emily Watson, and Philip Seymour Hoffman at the 2002 Cannes Film Festival

After the success of Boogie Nights, New Line told Anderson he could do whatever he wanted for his next film and granted him creative control. Anderson initially wanted to make a film that was "intimate and small-scale", but the script "kept blossoming". The result was the ensemble piece Magnolia (1999), which tells the story of the peculiar interaction of several people in San Fernando Valley. It was inspired by the music of the singer-songwriter Aimee Mann, who wrote songs for its soundtrack. At the 72nd Academy Awards, Magnolia was nominated for three awards, including Best Supporting Actor (Tom Cruise), Best Original Song ("Save Me"), and Best Original Screenplay. After its release, Anderson said, "Magnolia is, for better or worse, the best movie I'll ever make".

=== 2000s ===
After the success of Magnolia, Anderson said he would make his next film around 90 minutes and would work with Adam Sandler. Punch-Drunk Love (2002) follows a beleaguered entrepreneur in love with his sister's co-worker. A subplot was inspired by civil engineer David Phillips. Sandler received critical praise for his first dramatic role in the film. At the 2002 Cannes Film Festival, Anderson won the Best Director Award and was nominated for the Palme d'Or. Time Out included it among the best films of the 21st century. Karina Longworth wrote, "Anderson's cracked ode to the transformative power of love in a world that actively mocks sensitivity is perhaps his most original work".

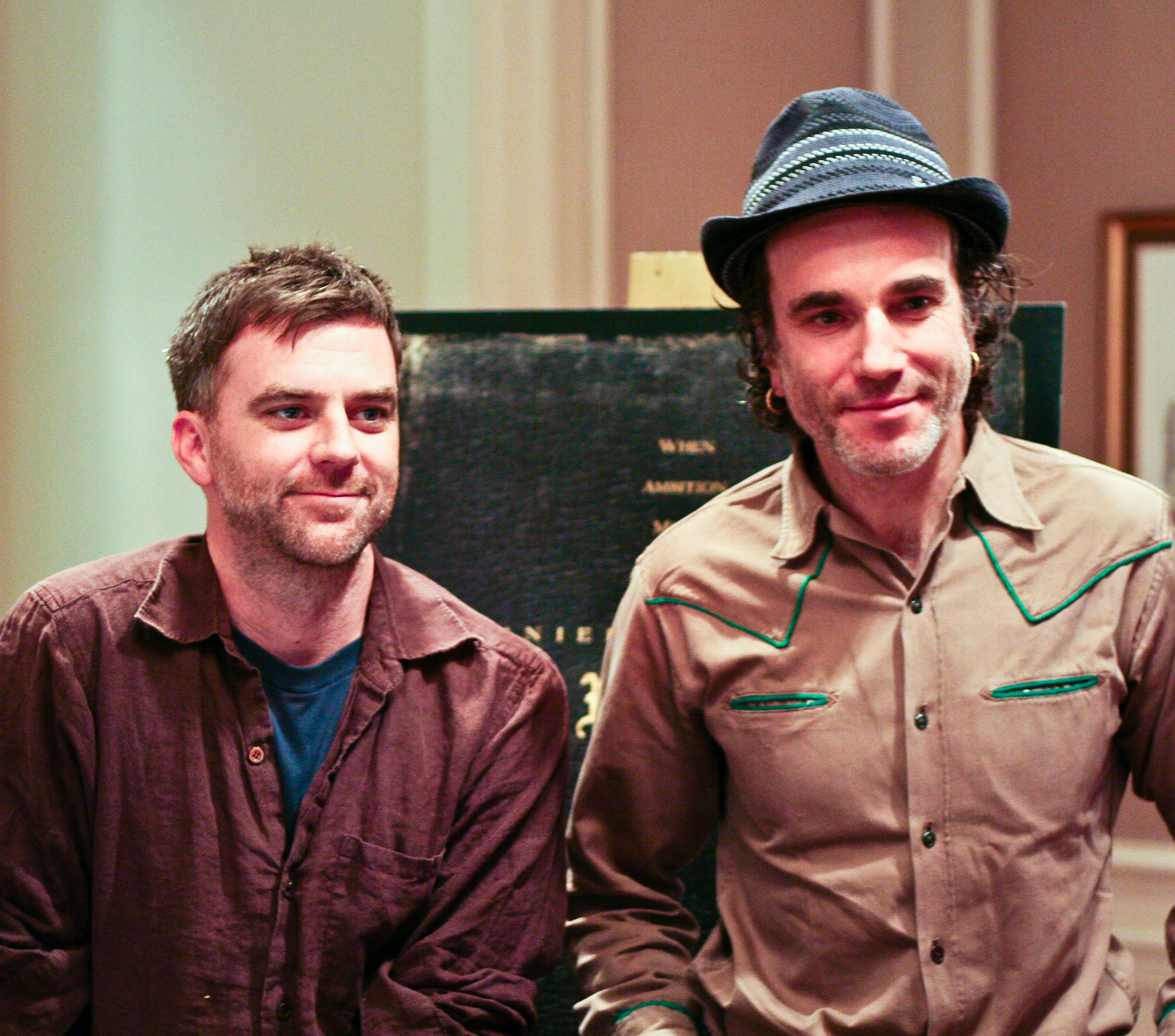
Anderson with Daniel Day-Lewis in 2007.

There Will Be Blood (2007), Anderson's fifth film, is loosely based on Upton Sinclair's 1927 novel Oil! It follows a ruthless oil prospector exploiting the Southern California oil boom in the early 20th century. Against a $25 million budget, the film earned $76.1 million worldwide.

At the 80th Academy Awards, it was nominated for eight awards, tying with No Country for Old Men. Anderson was nominated for Best Picture, Best Director and Best Adapted Screenplay, losing all three to the Coen Brothers for No Country for Old Men. Daniel Day-Lewis won Best Actor and Robert Elswit won Best Cinematography. Paul Dano received a nomination for the BAFTA Award for Best Supporting Actor. Anderson was nominated for the Directors Guild of America Award for Outstanding Directing – Feature Film.

There Will Be Blood was regarded by some critics as one of the greatest films of the decade, with some further declaring it one of the most accomplished American films of the modern era. David Denby of The New Yorker wrote, "Anderson has now done work that bears comparison to the greatest achievements of Griffith and Ford", while Richard Schickel proclaimed it "one of the most wholly original American movies ever made." In 2017, New York Times film critics A. O. Scott and Manohla Dargis named it the "Best Film of the 21st Century So Far".

=== 2010s ===
In December 2009, Anderson worked on a new film about a "charismatic intellectual" starting a new religion in the 1950s. An associate of Anderson's stated that the idea for the film had been in his mind for twelve years. The Master was released on September 14, 2012, in North America, and received critical acclaim. The film follows an alcoholic World War II veteran, who meets the leader of a religious organization. Though the film does not refer to the movement, it has "long been widely assumed to be based on Scientology." At the 85th Academy Awards, the film was nominated for three awards, including for Best Actor (Joaquin Phoenix), Best Supporting Actor (Hoffman) and Best Supporting Actress (Amy Adams).

Production of the film adaptation for Thomas Pynchon's novel Inherent Vice began in May and ended in August 2013. The film marked the first time that Pynchon allowed his work to be adapted for the screen, and had Anderson work with Phoenix for a second time. The supporting cast includes Owen Wilson, Reese Witherspoon, Jena Malone, Martin Short, Benicio Del Toro, Katherine Waterston and Josh Brolin. Following its release in December 2014, the film was nominated for two awards at the 87th Academy Awards, including for Best Adapted Screenplay and Best Costume Design.

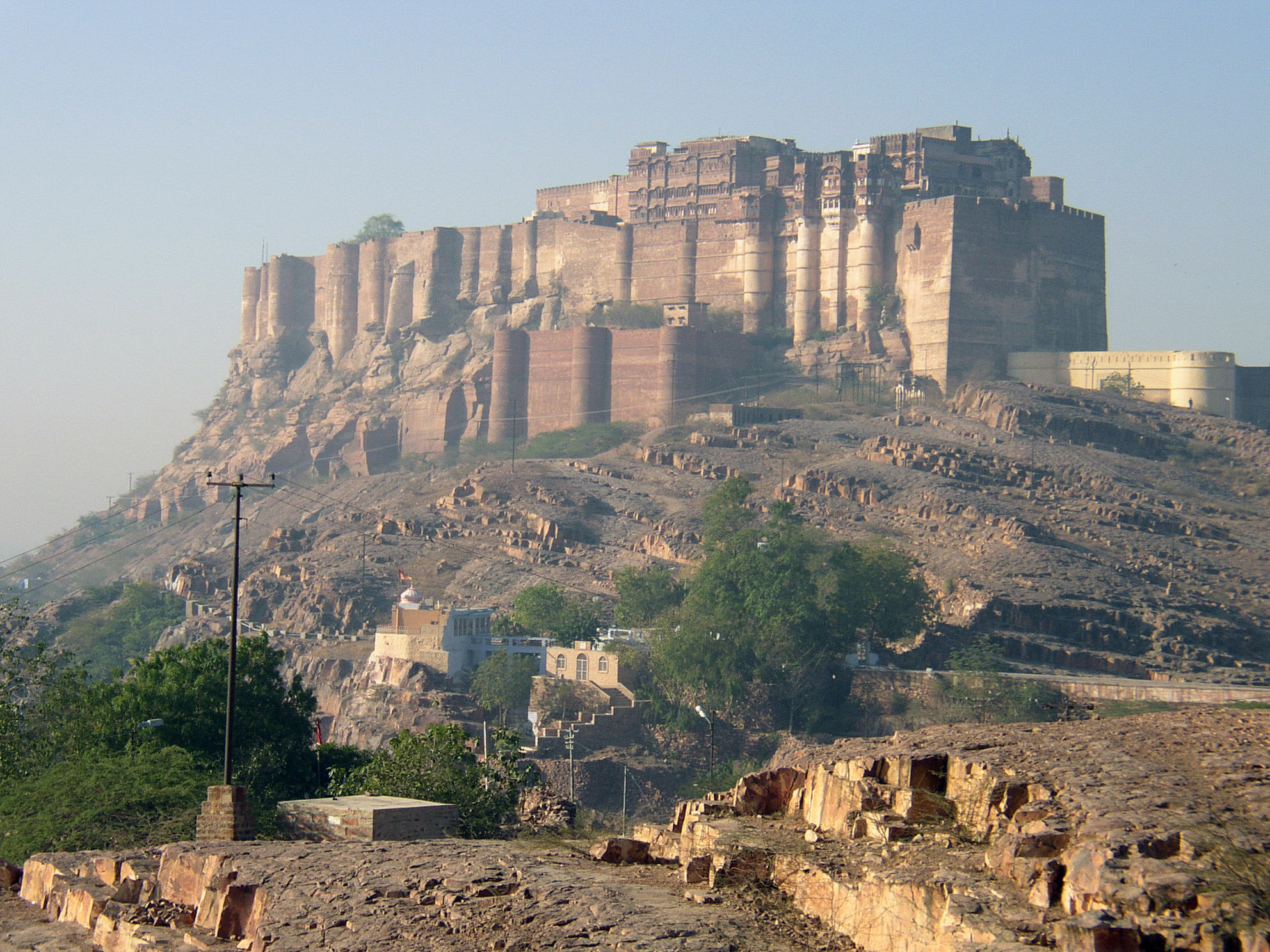
Mehrangarh Fort in Jodhpur, Rajasthan, where Junun was filmed.

Anderson directed Junun, a 2015 documentary about the making of the album by the composer and Radiohead guitarist Jonny Greenwood, the Radiohead producer Nigel Godrich, the Israeli composer Shye Ben Tzur, and a group of Indian musicians. Most of the performances were recorded at the 15th-century Mehrangarh Fort in Rajasthan. Junun premiered at the 2015 New York Film Festival to a generally favorable reception.

Anderson's eighth film, Phantom Thread, set in the London fashion industry, was released in December 2017. Day-Lewis starred, after his previous film Lincoln. The cast includes Lesley Manville and Vicky Krieps. Focus Features distributed the film in the United States, with Universal Pictures handling international distribution. Principal photography began in January 2017. Elswit was absent during production, and despite claims of Anderson acting as a cinematographer on the film, no official credit was given. On February 16, 2019, Elswit said he would not work with Anderson on his next films. Phantom Thread was nominated for six awards at the 90th Academy Awards, winning one for Best Costume Design, and the National Board of Review chose it as one of the top ten films of 2017. It has since been considered to be one of the best films of the 2010s.

In 2019, Anderson directed the short music film Anima, starring the Radiohead singer, Thom Yorke, and featuring music from Yorke's album Anima. It was screened in select IMAX theatres on June 26 and released on Netflix on June 27. It was nominated for Best Music Film at the 2020 Grammy Awards.

=== 2020s ===
Anderson's ninth film, Licorice Pizza, was released in December 2021. It was nominated for Best Picture, Best Director and Best Original Screenplay at the 94th Academy Awards. It follows a teenage actor (Cooper Hoffman) in love with a photography assistant (Alana Haim). In 2022, Anderson rewrote portions of Ridley Scott's 2023 film Napoleon after its lead actor, Joaquin Phoenix, who had worked with Anderson, threatened to leave the project.

On January 10, 2024, it was announced that Leonardo DiCaprio, Regina Hall, and Sean Penn were cast in Anderson's tenth film One Battle After Another, based at Warner Bros. Pictures. The film is a loose adaptation of Thomas Pynchon's novel, Vineland, with only a few narrative similarities; as Anderson described it, "with [Pynchon's] blessing" he "stole the parts that really resonated with me and started putting all these ideas together." Anderson first expressed a desire to adapt the novel around the release of Inherent Vice.

Production began in California that month with a reported $100 million budget. In the following February, Licorice Pizza actress Alana Haim and singer Teyana Taylor had joined the cast. One Battle After Another was released on September 26, 2025, to critical acclaim. It grossed $22 million at the box office in its opening weekend and achieved a $200 million total gross, and became Anderson's highest-grossing film. Among the film's numerous accolades, Anderson won the Oscars for Best Director, Best Adapted Screenplay and Best Picture at the 98th Academy Awards.

=== Other work ===
In 2000, Anderson wrote and directed a segment for Saturday Night Live with Ben Affleck, "SNL FANatic", based on the MTV series FANatic. He was a standby director during the 2005 filming of Robert Altman's A Prairie Home Companion for insurance purposes, as Altman was 80 years old and in poor health. In 2008, Anderson co-wrote and directed a 70-minute play at the Largo Theatre, comprising a series of vignettes starring Maya Rudolph and Fred Armisen, with a live score by Jon Brion.

Anderson has directed music videos for acts including Fiona Apple, Radiohead, Haim, Joanna Newsom, Aimee Mann, Jon Brion, and Michael Penn. He directed a short film for Haim in 2017, Valentine, featuring three musical performances. In 2023, Anderson collaborated with Yorke and Greenwood again on the videos for "Wall of Eyes" and "Friend of a Friend", by their band the Smile.

== Filmmaking ==
=== Influences ===
Anderson dropped out of film school after attending for two days, preferring instead to learn by watching the films of directors he liked along with the accompanying director's audio commentary. He has cited Robert Altman, Martin Brest, Jonathan Demme, Robert Downey Sr., Alfred Hitchcock, John Huston, Alex Cox, Stanley Kubrick, Akira Kurosawa, David Mamet, Anthony Mann, Max Ophüls, Martin Scorsese, Steven Spielberg, François Truffaut, and Orson Welles as his influences.

Countless film critics and historians have over the course of several decades often drawn comparison between Anderson's early films and Martin Scorsese's and Robert Altman's classics. The opening long take of Boogie Nights is often compared to the iconic tracking shot from Scorsese's Goodfellas, the film's fast-paced editing during the second half and morally questionable characters are also commonly cited as similarities between the two films. The gigantic acting ensemble, themes of dysfunctional families, three-hour runtime and the casting of Julliane Moore in Magnolia has led to a lot of comparisons with Robert Altman's film Short Cuts, to the point where some people consider Magnolia to be a remake of Short Cuts.

=== Themes and style ===
Anderson is known for films set in the San Fernando Valley with realistically flawed and desperate characters. Among the themes dealt with in the films are dysfunctional families, alienation, surrogate families, regret, loneliness, destiny, the power of forgiveness, and ghosts of the past. Anderson makes frequent use of repetition to build emphasis and thematic consistency. In Boogie Nights, Magnolia, Punch Drunk Love, and The Master, the phrase "I didn't do anything" is used at least once, developing themes of responsibility and denial.

His films are known for having a bold visual style with stylistic trademarks, such as constantly moving camera shots, steadicam-based long takes, memorable use of music, and multilayered audiovisual imagery. Anderson tends to reference the Book of Exodus, either explicitly or subtly, like in recurring references to Exodus 8:2 in Magnolia, which chronicles the plague of frogs, culminating with the literal raining of frogs in the film's climax, or the title and themes in There Will Be Blood, a phrase in Exodus 7:19, which details the plague of blood.

Within his first three films, Hard Eight, Boogie Nights, and Magnolia, Anderson explored themes of dysfunctional families, alienation, and loneliness. Boogie Nights and Magnolia were noted for their large ensemble casts, which he returned to in Inherent Vice. In Punch-Drunk Love, Anderson explored similar themes, but expressed a different visual style, shedding the influences and references of his earlier films, being more surreal and having a heightened sense of reality. It was also short, compared to his previous two films, at 90 minutes.

There Will Be Blood stood apart from his first four films, but shared similar themes and style, such as flawed characters, moving camera, memorable music, and a lengthy running time. The movie was more overtly engaged with politics than his previous films had been, examining capitalism and themes such as greed, savagery, optimism and obsession. The Master dealt with "ideas about American personality, success, rootlessness, master-disciple dynamics, and father-son mutually assured destruction." All of his films have American themes, with business versus art in Boogie Nights, ambition in There Will Be Blood, and self-reinvention in The Master.

Anderson is a proponent of shooting on film stock as opposed to digital cinematography, as he feels it has a textured image quality over the cleaner appearance of digital formats. His projects are most commonly shot on 35 mm movie film, typically in the anamorphic format, particularly during collaborations with cinematographer Robert Elswit. However Anderson has also employed larger film formats such as 65 mm film on The Master and VistaVision for One Battle After Another. Anderson has also demonstrated a preference for traditional photochemical colour timing over digital intermediates, either avoiding the use of DI's altogether or treating them as secondary to a film-timed reference print.

=== Collaborators ===
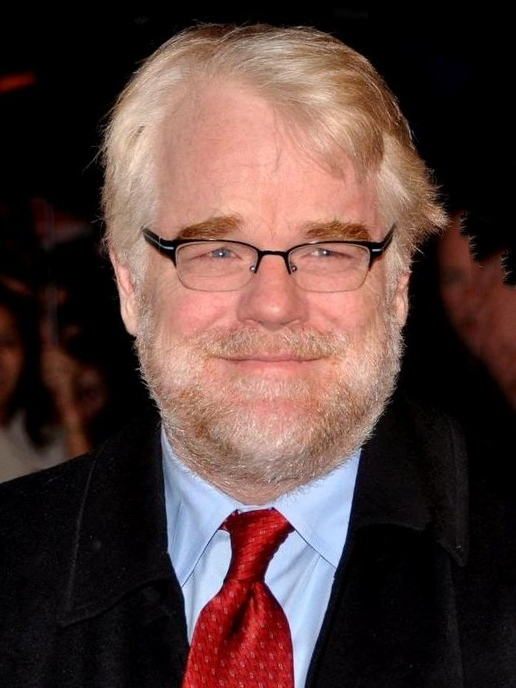
Philip Seymour Hoffman appeared in five of Anderson's films.

Anderson frequently collaborates with many actors and crew, carrying them from film to film. He has referred to regular actors as "my little rep company"; they include John C. Reilly, Philip Baker Hall, Julianne Moore, William H. Macy, Melora Walters, and Philip Seymour Hoffman. Luis Guzmán is also considered an Anderson regular. Hoffman acted in Anderson's first four films as well as The Master. Except for Paul F. Tompkins, Kevin Breznahan, and Jim Meskimen, who all had equally minor roles in Magnolia, There Will Be Blood had an entirely new cast.

Anderson is one of three directors–the others being Jim Sheridan and Martin Scorsese–with whom Daniel Day-Lewis has collaborated more than once. Robert Elswit served as cinematographer for Anderson's films through Inherent Vice, except for The Master which was shot by Mihai Mălaimare Jr. Jon Brion served as a composer for Hard Eight, Magnolia and Punch-Drunk Love, and Jonny Greenwood of Radiohead for every film since. Dylan Tichenor edited Boogie Nights, Magnolia, There Will Be Blood, and Phantom Thread. Anderson regularly works with producers including JoAnne Sellar, Scott Rudin, Michael De Luca, and Daniel Lupi, and casting director Cassandra Kulukundis.

Frequent collaborators with Paul Thomas Anderson
Collaborator	Role	Hard Eight	Boogie Nights	Magnolia	Punch-Drunk Love	There Will Be Blood	The Master	Inherent Vice	Phantom Thread	Licorice Pizza	One Battle After Another	Total
Michael Bauman	Cinematographer (Note: also Lighting Technician)						Yes	Yes	Yes	Yes	Yes	5
Jon Brion	Composer	Yes		Yes	Yes						Yes	4
Mark Bridges	Costume designer	Yes	Yes	Yes	Yes	Yes	Yes	Yes	Yes	Yes		9
Robert Elswit	Cinematographer	Yes	Yes	Yes	Yes	Yes		Yes				6
Jonny Greenwood	Composer					Yes	Yes	Yes	Yes	Yes	Yes	6
Luis Guzmán	Actor		Yes	Yes	Yes							3
Philip Baker Hall	Actor	Yes	Yes	Yes								3
Philip Seymour Hoffman	Actor	Yes	Yes	Yes	Yes		Yes					5
Leslie Jones	Editor				Yes		Yes	Yes				3
Andy Jurgensen	Editor (Note: also Assistant Editor)							Yes	Yes	Yes	Yes	4
Cassandra Kulukundis	Casting		Yes	Yes	Yes	Yes	Yes	Yes	Yes	Yes	Yes	9
Daniel Lupi	Producer	Yes	Yes	Yes	Yes	Yes	Yes	Yes	Yes	Yes		9
John C. Reilly	Actor	Yes	Yes	Yes						Yes		4
JoAnne Sellar	Producer		Yes	Yes	Yes	Yes	Yes	Yes	Yes	Yes		8
Adam Somner	Producer & AD					Yes	Yes	Yes	Yes	Yes	Yes	6
Dylan Tichenor	Editor	Yes	Yes	Yes		Yes			Yes			5
Melora Walters	Actor	Yes	Yes	Yes			Yes					4

== Filmography ==
Directed features
Year	Title	Distributor
1996	Hard Eight	Rysher Entertainment / The Samuel Goldwyn Company
1997	Boogie Nights	New Line Cinema
1999	Magnolia	New Line Cinema
2002	Punch-Drunk Love	Sony Pictures Releasing
2007	There Will Be Blood	Paramount Vantage / Miramax
2012	The Master	The Weinstein Company
2014	Inherent Vice	Warner Bros. Pictures
2017	Phantom Thread	Focus Features / Universal Pictures
2021	Licorice Pizza	United Artists Releasing / Universal Pictures
2025	One Battle After Another	Warner Bros. Pictures

== Personal life ==
Anderson has a reputation for being secretive about his personal life. He dated singer-songwriter Fiona Apple from 1997 to 2002. Apple said in 2020 that he had anger issues during their relationship, and once threw a chair across the room and another time shoved her out of his car. Apple said that aspects of the relationship had made her feel "fearful and numb". Anderson is in a long-term relationship with the actress and comedian Maya Rudolph. They have four children, and although they are not legally married, Rudolph refers to Anderson as her husband. Anderson is a vegan.

== Awards and recognition ==
Anderson has been called "one of the most exciting talents to come along in years" and "among the supreme talents of today." After the release of Boogie Nights and Magnolia, Anderson was praised as a "wunderkind". In 2007, the American Film Institute regarded him as "one of American film's modern masters." In 2012, The Guardian ranked him number one on its list of "The 23 Best Film Directors in the World," writing "his dedication to his craft has intensified, with his disdain for PR and celebrity marking him out as the most devout filmmaker of his generation." In 2013, Entertainment Weekly named him the eighth-greatest working director, calling him "one of the most dynamic directors to emerge in the last 20 years." Peter Travers of Rolling Stone wrote that "The Master, the sixth film from the 42-year-old writer-director, affirms his position as the foremost filmmaking talent of his generation. Anderson is a rock star, the artist who knows no limits."

Other directors have lauded him. In an interview with Jan Aghed, Ingmar Bergman referenced Magnolia as being an example of the strength of American cinema. Sam Mendes referred to Anderson as "a true auteur–and there are very few of those who I would classify as geniuses". In his 2013 acceptance speech for the Golden Globe Award for Best Director, Ben Affleck compared Anderson to Orson Welles. Anderson is the only person to win all three director prizes from the three major international film festivals (Berlin, Cannes, and Venice).

Awards and nominations received by Anderson's films
Year	Title	Academy Awards		BAFTA Awards		Golden Globe Awards	
Year	Title	Nominations	Wins	Nominations	Wins	Nominations	Wins
1997	Boogie Nights	3		2		2	1
1999	Magnolia	3				2	1
2002	Punch-Drunk Love					1	
2007	There Will Be Blood	8	2	9	1	2	1
2012	The Master	3		4		3	
2014	Inherent Vice	2				1	
2017	Phantom Thread	6	1	4	1	2	
2021	Licorice Pizza	3		5	1	4	
2025	One Battle After Another	13	6	14	6	9	4
Total		41	9	38	9	26	7

Directed Academy Award performances

Under Anderson's direction, these actors have received Academy Award wins and nominations for their performances in their respective roles.

Year	Performer	Film	Result
Academy Award for Best Actor
2008	Daniel Day-Lewis	There Will Be Blood	Won
2013	Joaquin Phoenix	The Master	Nominated
2018	Daniel Day-Lewis	Phantom Thread	Nominated
2026	Leonardo DiCaprio	One Battle After Another	Nominated
Academy Award for Best Supporting Actor
1998	Burt Reynolds	Boogie Nights	Nominated
2000	Tom Cruise	Magnolia	Nominated
2012	Philip Seymour Hoffman	The Master	Nominated
2026	Benicio del Toro	One Battle After Another	Nominated
2026	Sean Penn	One Battle After Another	Won
Academy Award for Best Supporting Actress
1998	Julianne Moore	Boogie Nights	Nominated
2013	Amy Adams	The Master	Nominated
2018	Lesley Manville	Phantom Thread	Nominated
2026	Teyana Taylor	One Battle After Another	Nominated

== Bibliography ==
- Waxman, Sharon R. (2005). Rebels on the backlot: six maverick directors and how they conquered the Hollywood studio system. HarperCollins. ISBN 978-0-06-054017-3. Archived from the original on August 15, 2025.
