= The Dirk Diggler Story =

- Directed by: Paul Thomas Anderson
- Written by: Paul Thomas Anderson
- Produced by: Shane Conrad
- Starring: Michael Stein; Robert Ridgely; Eddie Delcore; Rusty Schwimmer
- Narrated by: Ernie Anderson
- Cinematography: Paul Thomas Anderson
- Edited by: Paul Thomas Anderson
- Release date: 1988
- Running time: 32 minutes
- Country: United States
- Language: English

The Dirk Diggler Story is a 1988 mockumentary short film written and directed by Paul Thomas Anderson. It follows the rise and fall of Dirk Diggler, a fictional well-endowed male porn star. The character was modeled on American porn actor John Holmes. The film was later expanded into Anderson's 1997 film Boogie Nights.

== Plot summary ==
Dirk Diggler (Michael Stein) was born as Steven Samuel Adams on April 15, 1961, outside of Saint Paul, Minnesota. His father is a construction worker and his mother a boutique shop owner who both attend church every Sunday. Looking for a career as a male model, Diggler drops out of school at age 16 and leaves home. Jack Horner (Robert Ridgely) discovers Diggler at a falafel stand. Diggler meets his friend, Reed Rothchild (Eddie Delcore), through Horner in 1979, while working on a film.

Horner gradually exposes Diggler to the company until Diggler becomes well known in the industry. Diggler becomes a prominent model and begins appearing in pornographic films. Diggler has critical and box office hits which lead him to stardom. The hits and publicity lead to fame and money, which lead Diggler to the world of drugs. With the amount of money Diggler is making, he is able to support both his and Rothchild's addictions. The drugs eventually cause a breakup between Diggler and Horner since Diggler is having issues with his performance on set.

After the breakup, Diggler tries to make a film himself, but it is never completed. He then attempts a music career, which is successful, but leads him deeper into drugs because of the amount of money he is making. He then stars in a TV show which is both a critical and commercial failure. Having failed and with no work, Diggler returns to the porn industry, taking roles in low-budget gay porn to pay his bills and his addictions. On July 17, 1981, during a film shoot with Horner, Diggler dies of a drug overdose.

The film ends with a quotation from Diggler: "All I ever wanted was a cool '78 'Vette and a house in the country."

== Cast ==
- Michael Stein – Steven Samuel Adams (Dirk Diggler)
- Robert Ridgely – Jack Horner
- Eddie Delcore – Reed Rothchild
- Rusty Schwimmer – Candy Kane
- Ernie Anderson – Narrator

== Production ==
The film was Anderson's first real production having experimented with what he called "standard fare". Anderson conceived the film when he was 17 years old and a senior at Montclair College Preparatory School. Anderson called his friend Michael Stein, telling him to come over for a production meeting, and told Stein his idea: "John Holmes". Stein loved the idea and was cast to play the role of Dirk Diggler; he selected his own wardrobe. Stein showed Anderson some video of his friend Eddie Dalcour, who was a professional body builder, which Anderson loved and cast him in the role of Reed Rothchild. Anderson's father, Ernie Anderson, narrated the film and Robert Ridgely, a friend of Anderson's father, played the role of Jack Horner.

The film was shot in 1987 using a video camera and steadicam provided by Anderson's father, Ernie "Ghoulardi" Anderson. Some scenes were shot at a motel. Anderson raised money for the film by cleaning cages in a pet store. Being influenced by This Is Spinal Tap at the time, he decided to do a mockumentary and used the John Holmes documentary, Exhausted, as a model for the film, even taking some dialogue almost word-for-word. Anderson worked from a shot list and wanted the actors to be serious since the characters took their work seriously. Anderson edited the film using two VCRs. According to Anderson, the film drew admiring laughs when it was shown at a University of Southern California film festival.

== Boogie Nights ==
The Dirk Diggler Story was expanded into Anderson's 1997 breakout film Boogie Nights with a number of scenes appearing almost verbatim in both films. Michael Stein and Robert Ridgely, who respectively played Dirk Diggler and Jack Horner (assumed by Mark Wahlberg and Burt Reynolds respectively in the film) in the short film made appearances in Boogie Nights. Ridgely played the supporting role of The Colonel James, the original financier of Jack's films while Stein made a cameo appearance as the stereo store customer who talks with Don Cheadle's Buck Swope. The main differences between The Dirk Diggler Story and Boogie Nights are the mockumentary versus narratives styles in the former and latter films, respectively; Additional differences include Diggler's stint in gay porn and death from a drug overdose in the short film versus his prostitution and happy return to his former life in the feature film and the aspect ratio being in 1.33:1 in The Dirk Diggler Story and 2.40:1 in Boogie Nights.
