= Inherent Vice =

2009 novel by Thomas Pynchon

- First edition cover design
- Author: Thomas Pynchon
- Language: English
- Genre: Postmodern literature; detective novel
- Published: August 4, 2009 (Penguin Press)
- Publication place: United States
- Media type: Print (hardcover)
- Pages: 369 pp
- ISBN: 978-1-59420-224-7
- OCLC: 276819214
- Dewey Decimal: 813/.54 22
- LC Class: PS3566.Y55 I54 2009

Inherent Vice is a novel by the American author Thomas Pynchon, originally published on August 4, 2009. A darkly comic detective novel set in 1970s California, the plot follows sleuth Larry "Doc" Sportello whose ex-girlfriend asks him to investigate a scheme involving a prominent land developer. Themes of drug culture and counterculture are prominently featured. It is considered a postmodern novel that warps the stylistic conventions of detective fiction. Critical reception was largely positive, with reviewers describing Inherent Vice as one of Pynchon's more accessible works. The novel was adapted into a film in 2014.

== Plot summary ==
The novel is set in Los Angeles in 1970. Larry "Doc" Sportello, a private investigator and pothead, receives a visit from his former girlfriend Shasta Fay Hepworth, who is now having an affair with real-estate mogul Michael Z. "Mickey" Wolfmann. Shasta asks Doc to help foil a plot allegedly hatched by Mickey's wife Sloane and her lover, Riggs Warbling, to have Mickey admitted to a mental health institution. Later, a black militant named Tariq Khalil asks Doc to find Glen Charlock, one of Mickey's bodyguards—Tariq claims that Charlock owes him money after their time spent together in prison.

Doc visits one of Mickey's developments but is knocked unconscious, and awakes to find himself being questioned by his old LAPD nemesis, Det. Christian F. "Bigfoot" Bjornsen, who informs Doc that Charlock has been shot dead and Mickey has vanished. Later, Doc is visited by Hope Harlingen, the widow of a musician named Coy Harlingen, who wants Doc to investigate rumors that Coy is still alive. Doc learns that Coy has been working for the government as an informer and agent provocateur, but is allowed no contact with his family. He finds Coy in a nightclub, and he tells Doc about the Golden Fang, an old schooner suspected of bringing mysterious goods into port, and upon which both Mickey and Shasta are rumored to have departed. He also discovers that Puck Beaverton had switched shifts with Charlock on the day of Charlock's death.

Doc visits Golden Fang Enterprises where he meets Japonica Fenway, a young runaway whom Doc had returned to her wealthy parents on a previous occasion. Japonica reveals that she has stayed at a clinic named the Chryskylodon Institute. Doc visits the institute, where he again encounters Coy Harlingen, and deduces that Mickey has been apprehended by an unknown person. Doc is then told that the attack during which Glen Charlock was shot was carried out by a group of vigilantes who secretly work for the LAPD. Doc then discovers links between Puck Beaverton and a notorious loan shark named Adrian Prussia. After a visit from Trillium Fortnight, a female companion of Puck's, Doc travels to Las Vegas in search of Puck and Trillium's sexual threesome partner, Einar.

In Las Vegas, Doc places a bet with the manager of the Kismet Lounge, Fabian Fazzo, that Mickey had not faked his own disappearance. Later, Doc believes that he sees Mickey in the company of federal agents, and subsequently hears of Mickey's scheme for a philanthropic housing project in the desert. Doc visits the site and encounters Riggs Warbling, architect of the housing project, who fears that Mickey has been "reprogrammed" and that the development, already abandoned, will be destroyed.

Back in Los Angeles, Doc learns that Puck Beaverton and Bigfoot's former policing partner, Vincent Indelicato, were sworn enemies. Adrian Prussia permitted Puck to murder Vincent. Doc visits Adrian, who claims that he is behind the Golden Fang organization, while Puck contends that Glen was killed deliberately because he was supplying black-power groups with weapons. Doc is handcuffed and about to be given a lethal drug overdose, but escapes and kills both Puck and Adrian. Bigfoot, who has evidently been using Doc to investigate Vincent's death, picks Doc up, but sets him up with a huge quantity of stolen heroin.

Doc hides the drugs and is later contacted by Crocker Fenway, the father of Japonica, who acts as an intermediary for the Golden Fang. Doc arranges a handover, his only condition being that Coy is released from all of his obligations and allowed to return to his family. After the handover, Doc and his lawyer Sauncho hear that the Golden Fang schooner is leaving port. Along with the Coast Guard, they pursue the vessel, and watch as it is abandoned after encountering an enormous surf wave. Sauncho tells Doc that he had placed a claim on the schooner.

At the end of the novel, Doc receives a payment from Fabian Fazzo in settlement of his bet about Mickey. He also learns that Coy has been reunited with Hope and their child Amethyst.

== Reviews ==
In a generally favorable review, The New York Times' Michiko Kakutani called it "Pynchon Lite", describing it as "a simple shaggy-dog detective story that pits likable dopers against the Los Angeles Police Department and its 'countersubversive' agents, a novel in which paranoia is less a political or metaphysical state than a byproduct of smoking too much weed". A review by academic Louis Menand in The New Yorker declared the novel "a generally lighthearted affair", while adding that there were still "a few familiar apocalyptic touches, and a suggestion that countercultural California is a lost continent of freedom and play, swallowed up by the faceless forces of co-optation and repression". In a scathing review in New York magazine, Sam Anderson wrote that "with no suspense and nothing at stake, Pynchon's manic energy just feels like aimless invention".

Pynchon promoted the book with a video trailer, released before the hardback. The video featured Pynchon narrating as Doc, accompanied by footage of the book's California locale and period music.

== Film adaptation ==
Inherent Vice was adapted into a feature film by writer-director Paul Thomas Anderson in 2014. The film starred Joaquin Phoenix and was narrated by musician Joanna Newsom. On September 29, 2014, the first trailer and a poster for the film were released by Warner Bros. The film opened in the United States on December 12, 2014, to positive reviews.

The film closely followed the novel, often taking dialogue straight from the text. Changes include Anderson positioning Sortilège (played by Newsom), a minor character in the novel, as the film's narrator, and the excision of Doc's entire trip to Las Vegas.
