= Bob Mondello =

American film critic (born 1949)

Bob Mondello (born 1949) is an American film critic. Annually, Mondello sees over 300 films, commenting on them on radio, in print, and in speaking engagements at film clubs and public radio presentations.

== Career ==
Mondello spent more than a decade in entertainment advertising, as public relations director for Roth Theaters, a mid-Atlantic chain of movie theaters, and also for an independent repertory theater in D.C..

Mondello has worked for National Public Radio since 1984 as the arts critic and film and theater commentator for All Things Considered. He was theater critic for Washington City Paper from 1987 to 2003.

He has also written for The Washington Post, USA Today, and Preservation Magazine.

Mondello produces commentaries on the arts, including "American Stages" (2005) an eight-part NPR series exploring the history of the regional theater movement.

== Personal life ==
Mondello and his husband have resided in the Takoma neighborhood of Washington, D.C. since 2016. He has a second home in Argentina. He came out when he was 25 years old.
