= Transportation Building =

Transportation Building may refer to:

- Transportation Building (Chicago), Illinois, United States; demolished
- Transportation Building (Manhattan), New York City, New York, United States
- Transportation Building (Ottawa), Ontario, Canada
- Transportation Building (Toronto), Ontario, Canada; demolished
