= William W. Cook =

American attorney (1858–1930)

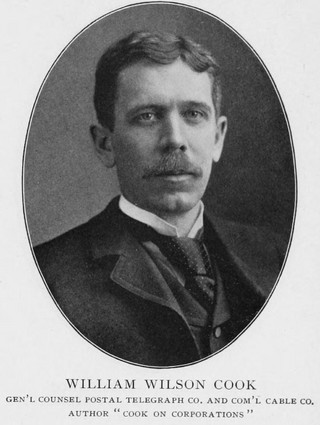
- Born: April 16, 1858; Hillsdale, Michigan, US
- Died: June 4, 1930 (aged 72); Port Chester, New York, US
- Education: University of Michigan (BA, JD)
- Occupation: Attorney
- Known for: Legal Scholar, benefactor of Hillsdale College and the University of Michigan Law School

William Wilson Cook (April 16, 1858 – June 4, 1930) was an American attorney and legal scholar. He wrote extensively on matters of corporate law, including the seminal text, Cook on Corporations. Cook was also an early, major benefactor of the University of Michigan, particularly the University of Michigan Law School.

== Biography ==
Cook was born in Hillsdale, Michigan, to John Potter Cook, a founder of Hillsdale, and his wife Martha. Cook attended the University of Michigan from 1876 to 1882, earning his undergraduate (1880) and law (1882) degrees from that institution.

He practiced law for many years in Manhattan, primarily for the Mackay telegraph and cable companies, and amassed a substantial fortune. In 1915, Cook constructed the Martha Cook Building women's dormitory on the Michigan campus and donated it to the university. In 1922, Cook announced his intention to construct a lawyers club and dormitory at University of Michigan. Cook hired the architectural firm of York and Sawyer to design the Lawyers Club, the first of several buildings built in the English Gothic style, all paid for and constructed by Cook, which would come to comprise the Law Quadrangle at the University of Michigan.

When the Lawyers Club was completed, the New York Times described it as "one of the finest buildings of its kind on any campus in the world".

Cook left his entire estate to the Michigan law school. The estate, valued at $20 million in 1930, would have been equivalent to about $260 million in 2006 dollars.

== Legacy ==
The law library constructed by Cook was named the William W. Cook Legal Research Library. In addition, several law professors at law schools abroad hold the position of William W. Cook Global Law Professor at Michigan, visiting the law school regularly and teaching courses.
