= Piccirilli =

Piccirilli is an Italian surname. Notable people with the surname include:

== Publishing ==
- Thomas Piccirilli (AKA Tom Piccirilli) (1965–2015), an author and a poet

== Sculpture ==
- Piccirilli Brothers, who were a family of renowned marble carvers that included:

Attilio Piccirilli (1866–1945), an Italian-American sculptor
Furio Piccirilli (March 14, 1869 – 1949), an Italian-American sculptor
