= Martha Cook Building =

Residence hall at the University of Michigan

Coordinates: 42.27474°N 83.73796°W

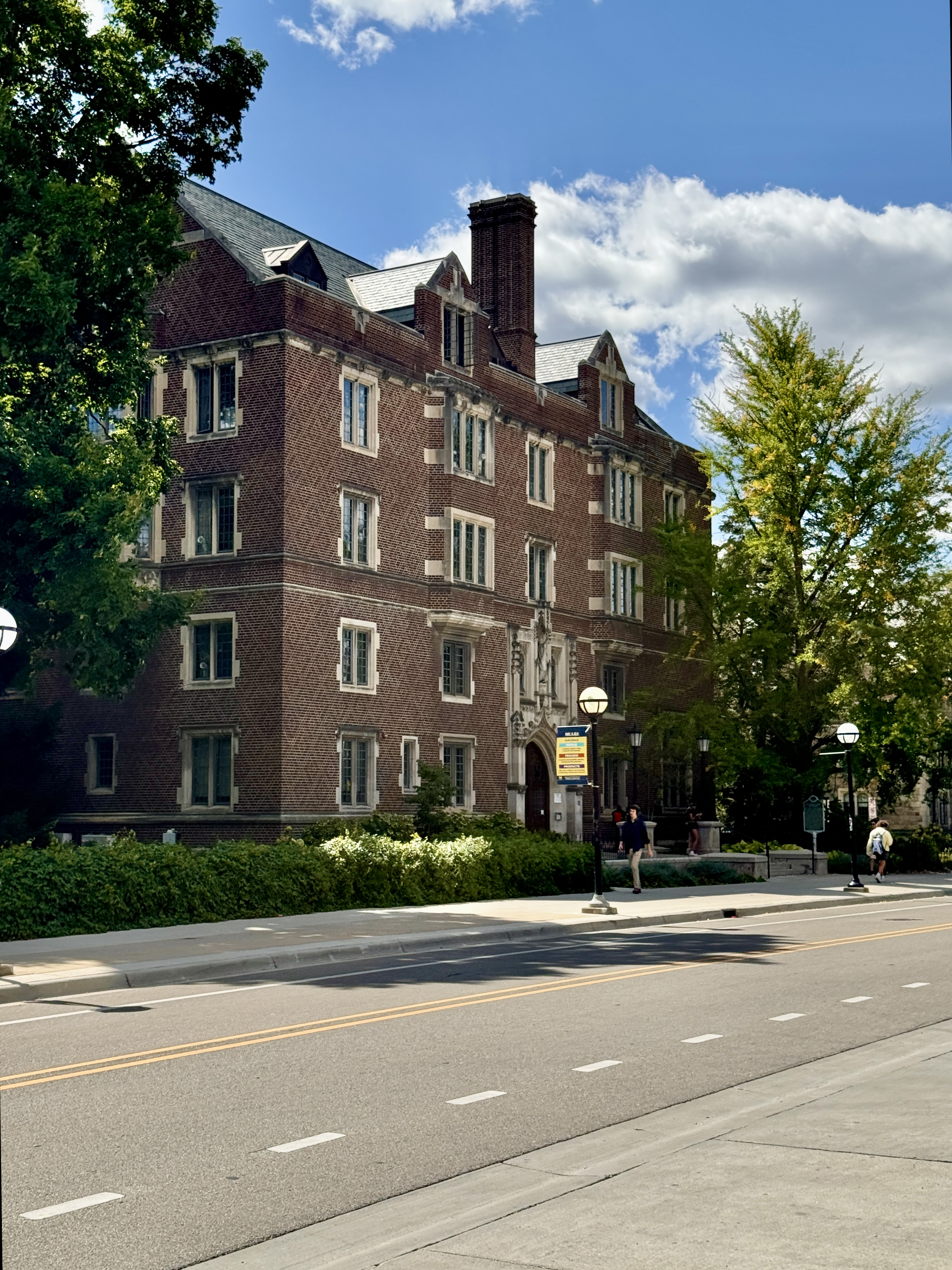
- Martha Cook Building
- Interactive map of Martha Cook Building

General information
- Opened: 1915

Martha Cook is a Collegiate Gothic women's residence hall at the University of Michigan in Ann Arbor. The building houses approximately 140 women pursuing undergraduate and graduate degrees from the University. Women may live in the building through all of their years of study, which is one of the features that separates this dormitory from other dormitory housing options. Martha Cook opened in the fall of 1915 as the first dormitory on campus for female students.

== Profile ==
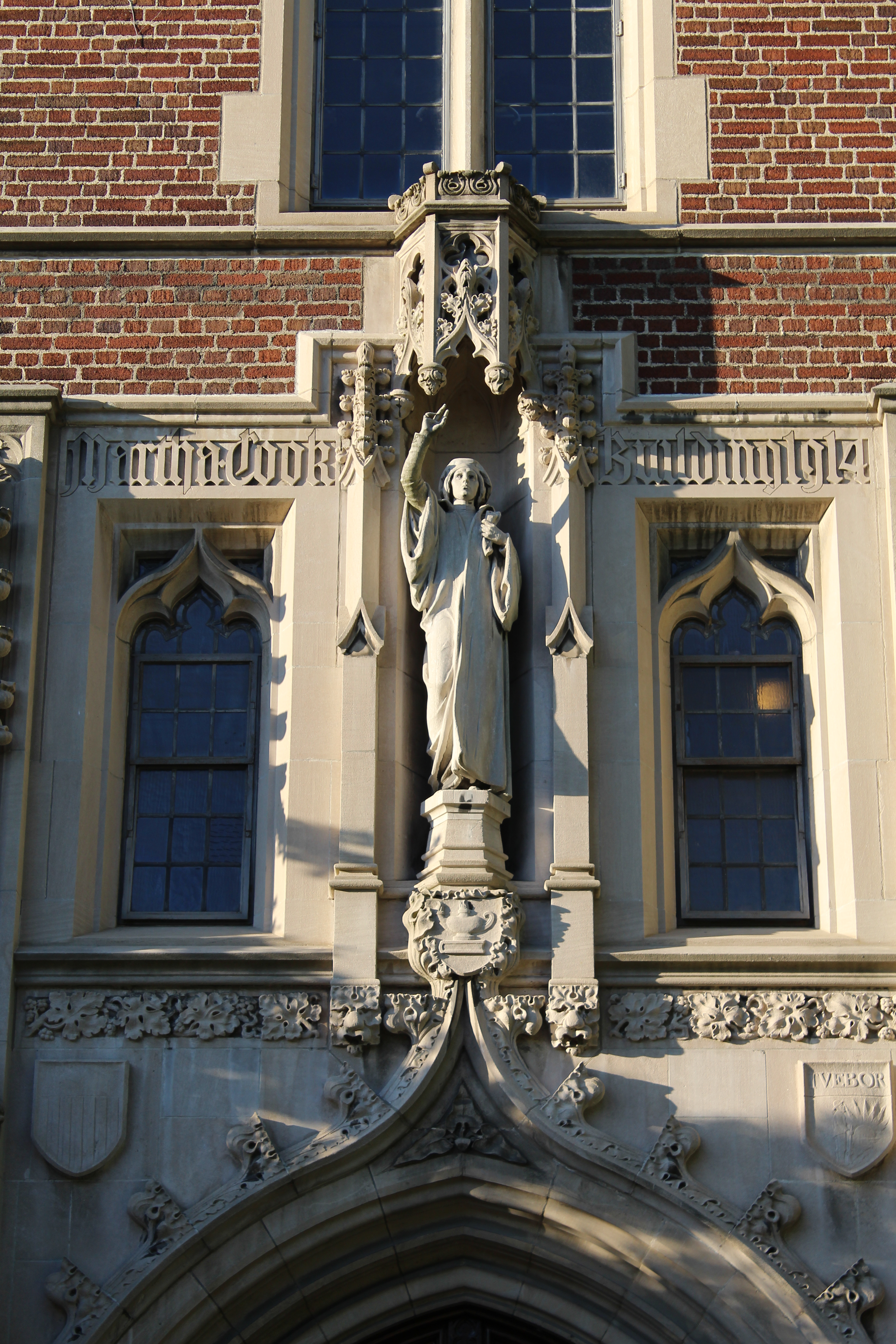
Statue of Portia, Martha Cook Building

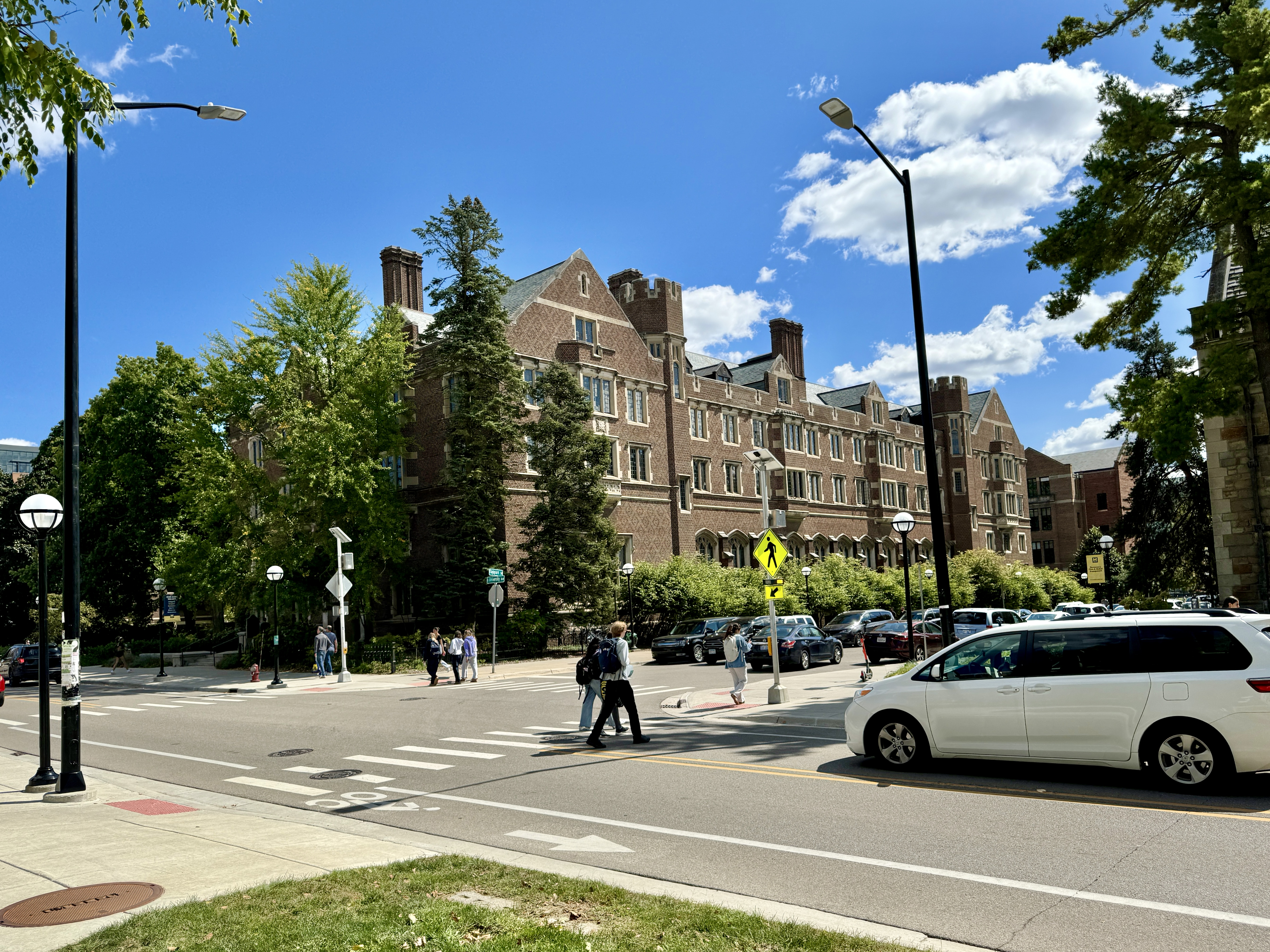
Martha Cook Building

The residence is one of three all-female residence halls on campus. Originally built for approximately 110 young women, more than 140 first-year students to graduates now live in the building. Martha Cook has many unique traditions, including weekly teas on Fridays. These teas are open to residents and their guests, although all members of the public are invited to Martha Cook's International Tea which is held in early spring each year. Other traditions which residents enjoy include the Dinner for New Women, Handel's Messiah Dinner, and weekly themed buffet dinners. Martha Cook has its own Dining Hall, which is private to those who live in the building. While the pantry has been updated, the wooden tables and chairs, the fireplaces, and the intricate designs allow the dining area to keep its historic appeal. The building is a historic building, and thus while updates have been made over the years, the building still keeps its historic charms. Some of these features include its architectural beauty, the Gold, Red, and Sparking rooms which serve as everything from study spots to the backdrops of Martha Cook events, and the larger sized rooms which accommodate the non-modular furniture.

In 1984 the front parlor of Martha Cook, called the Red Room, was transformed by director Robert Altman into the set for the film Secret Honor, a one-man play in which Richard Nixon (portrayed by Philip Baker Hall) sits alone in the San Clemente library reflecting on his presidency. The production crew was mostly made up of students in the film program.

The 100th anniversary of Martha Cook was celebrated over the weekend of October 23–25, 2015, with many past and present residents in attendance. Martha Cook is the only University of Michigan dormitory with an alumni association. There is an alumni board, as well as a board of governors, who help in making key decisions about the maintenance and upgrading of the building, raising scholarship money to assist residents with room and board, and helping plan events such as Fall and Spring Tea, which allow alumni to return to Martha Cook for tea once a semester.

== Location ==
Located on South University, across the street from the Law Quad and the Business School, Martha Cook is one of the closest residence halls to UM's central campus. The street address is 906 S. University Ave.

== History ==
Designed by the architectural firm of York and Sawyer, it was built in 1915. New York lawyer William W. Cook, a Michigan alumnus, donated it to the University in honor of his mother, Martha Wolford Cook. Above the main entrance is a statue of Portia by Furio Piccirilli, described as “Shakespeare’s most intellectual woman.” Samuel Parsons, the prominent landscape architect, designed the garden in 1921.
