= International Building =

International Building may refer to any of the following buildings:

- 601 California Street in San Francisco
- International Building (Rockefeller Center) in New York City
- International Building (Toronto)
