= Duck (film) =

- Film poster
- Directed by: Nic Bettauer
- Written by: Nic Bettauer
- Produced by: Nic Bettauer; Domini Hofmann
- Starring: Philip Baker Hall; Bill Brochtrup; Amy Hill
- Distributed by: Right Brained Releasing
- Release date: 2005
- Running time: 98 minutes
- Country: United States
- Language: English
- Budget: $300,000

Duck is a 2005 American drama film directed by Nic Bettauer and starring Philip Baker Hall. It is set in a dystopian view of the then-near future of 2009.

== Plot ==
After the death of his wife, Arthur Pratt is on the verge of suicide. However, after he has finished burying his wife's ashes at a nearby park, a duckling crosses his path. Noticing that the duckling is all alone, Arthur decides to help it find its brace. Unfortunately, they find its brace has been killed while crossing a road. In sympathy, Arthur takes the surviving duckling to his apartment, where he bathes and feeds it. No longer on the verge of suicide, Arthur commits himself to raising and taking care of the duckling, whom he names “Joe.”

After falling behind on his rent and because his retirement home does not allow pets, Arthur is evicted from his apartment and banned from the premises. Arthur returns with Joe to the park where they first met and is "transformed" into a full-grown duck. There, Arthur picks up the litter he finds and offers it to a waste collector, who informs him that the park is used as a landfill and will soon become a construction site for a shopping mall.

Workers from a septic and sewage service arrive to drain the pond on which they are living. They try to chase Joe away, but Joe has not learned to fly. The workers then start throwing things at Joe, and Arthur comes to his rescue. Following a quarrel with the workers, the fire department, members of a psychological evaluation team, the city's animal control and finally the police, Arthur and Joe leave the park for good and set out on a new journey.

During their wandering, Arthur and Joe cross paths with a variety of Los Angeles denizens, including: Norman, a blind man on his way to the beach and his guide dog Trisha. Leopold, a homeless man to whom Arthur gives a pair of socks, a man who is also on the verge of suicide because he knows his girlfriend is having an affair with his best friend, and a pedicurist whose husband was killed in Vietnam and who has moved to the United States looking for a better life for herself and her daughter.

Joe and Arthur make their way to a bridge where Arthur decides it may be best that they go their separate ways. Joe does not want to part from Arthur, but Arthur leaves him anyway. Joe then jumps off the bridge, and quacks in fright upon landing on the creek. Noticing the creek is full of toxic waste, Arthur once again rescues Joe. Arthur apologizes to Joe for abandoning him, telling him "I'd die without you, Joe."

Arthur and Joe finally arrive at the beach, and reuniting with their acquaintances Norman and Trisha. They walk companionably along the shore.

== Cast ==
- Philip Baker Hall as Arthur Pratt
- Bill Brochtrup as Leopold
- Amy Hill as Pedicurist
- Noel Gugliemi as Lord of the Garbage
- Larry Cedar as Mr. Janney
- French Stewart as Jumper
- Bill Cobbs as Norman

According to The Boston Globe, Joe is portrayed by the Aflac duck. However, it was later revealed in 2011 that about twenty ducks played Joe.

== Reception ==
Rotten Tomatoes, a review aggregator, reports that 50% of 18 surveyed critics gave the film a positive review; the average rating is 5.3/10. Metacritic rated it 53/100 based on seven reviews. Lisa Nesselson of Variety called it "a small, affecting road movie peopled with sharp vignettes". Michael Rechtshaffen of The Hollywood Reporter wrote, "Bettauer has a lot of serious things to put across about survival in the big, unfeeling metropolis, and while her modern-day fable obviously has Capra-esque intentions, the maudlin results cry out for a better focused, more sharply executed plan of attack." Gary Goldstein at reel.com rated it 1.5 stars, saying "Duck is a turkey" and "Bettauer's made a tedious, groan-worthy picture notable only for the bigger issues it attempts—and fails—to successfully explore than for any real entertainment value." The New York Times said "it tries too hard" and "ducks aren't all that endearing". Mark Feeney in the Boston Globe said that Bettauer "strikes a very uneasy balance" between playing for tears or laughs.
