= Secret Honor =

1984 film by Robert Altman

- Film poster
- Directed by: Robert Altman
- Written by: Donald Freed; Arnold M. Stone
- Produced by: Robert Altman
- Starring: Philip Baker Hall
- Cinematography: Pierre Mignot
- Edited by: Juliet Weber
- Music by: George Burt
- Distributed by: Cinecom Pictures
- Release date: July 6, 1984 (San Francisco)
- Running time: 90 minutes
- Country: United States
- Language: English

Secret Honor is a 1984 American historical drama film directed by Robert Altman, written by Donald Freed and Arnold M. Stone, and starring Philip Baker Hall. It is based on the play by Freed and Stone, and follows Richard Nixon as a fictional account attempting to gain insight. It was filmed at the University of Michigan, in the Martha Cook Building's Red Room.

== Plot ==
A disgraced Richard Nixon is restlessly pacing in the study of his Saddle River, New Jersey mansion in the early 1980s. Armed with a loaded revolver, a bottle of Scotch whisky and a running tape recorder, while surrounded by closed-circuit television cameras, he spends the next ninety minutes in a long monologue recalling with rage, suspicion, sadness, and disappointment, throughout his controversial life and career.

It often veers into tangents and concerns his family, the people who made him powerful or who took him out of power. Nixon recalls his mother fondly, Dwight Eisenhower with hatred, Henry Kissinger with condescension, and John F. Kennedy with a mixture of appreciation and rage. When Nixon gets angry at someone he is thinking about, the monologue often becomes disjointed. The passion overwhelms Nixon's ability to speak coherently. If he veers too far off topic, he tells the person who is supposed to transcribe the tape (an unseen character named "Roberto") to edit out the whole screed and go back to an earlier, calmer point.

Throughout the monologue, Nixon's description of himself changes. Sometimes he calls himself a man of the people, saying that he could succeed because he had known failure, just like the average American. He broods on his humble beginnings and the hard work he put in to rise to the top, and all the setbacks that he endured and overcame. However, the times when he talks about his own ideas and accomplishments in flattering terms tend to be brief, and they often bleed into self-pitying rants about how he is an innocent martyr, destroyed by evil and hypocritical forces. Similarly, he can be self-deprecating or otherwise reflect a low self-image, but he rarely focuses on his own faults for long, preferring instead to blame others. He denies the relevance of Watergate and claims that he never committed a crime. He emphasizes that he was never charged with it, therefore he did not need or deserve a pardon. He feels that the pardon he received from President Gerald Ford forever tainted him in the public's eyes, because to receive a pardon one must first be guilty.

However, Nixon admits that he has been the willing tool of a political network he alternately calls "the Bohemian Grove" and "The Committee of 100". The alleged interest of the committee is the heroin trade with Asia, although he followed them rather out of a lust for power plus some belief in their willingness to bring democracy to Asia. However, after the 1972 vote he received new orders from them: they wanted Nixon to keep the Vietnam War going on at all costs, then go for a third term in office, so they can continue their business with the president as their straw man. Nixon further explains that at some point he decided that he never wanted to go down in history as the president who sacrificed thousands of American soldiers for drug money, so he staged the Watergate scandal to leave the office against massive public support. Nixon puts the blame on others: on the public that supports him although – or even because – he is a scam artist and a petty thief, just like the majority of them, as he sees it.

Nixon pulls back the hammer on the gun and raises it to his head, where he allows it to linger for a few quiet seconds, before dropping it back on the desk. Nixon launches into the impassioned final moments of his monologue, saying: "They wanted me to kill myself. Well, I won't do it. If they want me dead, they'll have to do it ... Fuck 'em!" Accompanied with a resolute and defiant fist pump that freezes at its zenith, Nixon's emphatic delivery of the monologue's final two words is shown playing on a loop in staggered intervals across all his closed circuit television monitors while in the background chants of "Four more years!" increasingly grow louder until the looped footage disappears into static.

== Reception ==
Roger Ebert awarded four stars out of four and lauded it as "one of the most scathing, lacerating and brilliant movies of 1984," and wrote that Hall played his role "with such savage intensity, such passion, such venom, such scandal, that we cannot turn away." He ranked the film sixth on his year-end list of the best films of 1984. Gene Siskel of the Chicago Tribune also awarded his top grade of four stars and stated that "thanks to a thoroughly outrageous but strangely credible script by Donald Freed and Arnold M. Stone, Robert Altman's film of the stage play 'Secret Honor' offers a fresh Richard Nixon, one truly worthy of pity, and at the same time properly assigns responsibility for his career to us as much as to him." He ranked the film seventh on his own 1984 best-of list. Vincent Canby of The New York Times called the film "a fascinating, funny, offbeat movie" and "something of a cinematic tour de force, both for Mr. Altman and for the previously unknown to me Philip Baker Hall, whose contribution is a legitimate, bravura performance, not a 'Saturday Night Live' impersonation." A review in Variety reporting from a pre-wide release screening in San Francisco wrote, "There isn't likely a broad audience for 'Secret Honor,' yet pic is really too good to remain a secret for long ... Philip Baker Hall is so physically and verbally impressive in his ravings that, should pic get a commercial release in L.A., the Academy would be quite realistic in considering him for a best acting Oscar. Hall's range in stumbling through his study and wildly reminiscing into a tape recorder is text book thesping, and his resemblance to Nixon is often unsettling." Linda Gross of the Los Angeles Times wrote that the film was "a remarkable character study of an American Everyman," with Hall giving "a superb, sustained performance. He delivers darkly the black night of a man's soul, and Altman has recorded it faithfully." Pauline Kael called the film "a small, weird triumph" and described Hall's performance as "an acting feat by a man who probably isn't a great actor," explaining that "Hall draws on his lack of a star presence and on an actor's fears of his own mediocrity in a way that seems to parallel Nixon's feelings. Though he doesn't closely resemble Nixon, he's got the Nixon twitches down pat, and he gets inside him with so much historical accuracy that it's as if we were watching the actual Nixon in the wildest scenes that others wrote about, and as if we were seeing the man we heard on the tapes."

== Home media ==
The film was released on region 1 DVD.
