= Cigarettes & Coffee =

- Directed by: Paul Thomas Anderson
- Written by: Paul Thomas Anderson
- Produced by: Patrick Hoelck; Wendy Weidman; Kirk Baltz
- Starring: Philip Baker Hall; Kirk Baltz; Miguel Ferrer
- Cinematography: Vincent J. Baldino
- Edited by: Barbara Tulliver
- Distributed by: Hex Films
- Release date: 1993
- Running time: 24 minutes
- Country: United States
- Language: English
- Budget: $20,000

Cigarettes & Coffee is a 1993 short film written and directed by Paul Thomas Anderson, and starring Philip Baker Hall. It tells the story of five people connected through a $20 bill. Anderson later used it as a basis for his directorial debut film, Hard Eight (1996).

== Plot ==
At a diner, a man (Kirk Baltz) talks to an older man (Philip Baker Hall) over cigarettes and coffee. He explains how, while gambling at a casino, he wrote his name on a $20 bill for good luck. Before he could use it, he ran into his friend Steve (M.K. Harris) and loaned him the bill. He headed back to the hotel room where he was supposed to meet Steve, Steve's wife, and his wife, but his wife told him that Steve and Steve's wife would come later. He saw the bill with his name on it on the floor and became paranoid. He took the bill and won almost $8,000 gambling with it. At another table, a husband is angry that his wife lost all their money gambling on craps. He recounts his marriage proposal and lights his last cigarette.

Outside, another man, Bill (Miguel Ferrer), finishes a phone call. He enters the diner and orders coffee and cigarettes, which he pays for with a $20 bill. The younger man confesses that he has paid to have Steve and his wife killed. As the waitress gives them their change, the older man notices the name Douglas Walker written on a $20 bill. He drops it on the floor. Bill returns to his car and opens the trunk; Steve is inside. The couple leave, and the woman takes the bill. The older man tells the younger man that drinking coffee and smoking a cigarette will make everything right. Outside, the couple kiss. Bill drives down a desert road.

== Cast ==
- Kirk Baltz as Douglas Walker
- Philip Baker Hall as Sydney
- Scott Coffey
- Miguel Ferrer as Bill
- Kim Gillingham
- M.K. Harris as Steve
- Jennifer Kaplan
- Bonnie Fidelman

== Production ==
While working as a production assistant, Anderson met Philip Baker Hall and informed him about a short script he had written for him. Hall read the script and was impressed.

The film was made for $20,000 financed with money Anderson won gambling, his girlfriend's credit card, $10,000 his father, Ernie Anderson, had set aside for college, and various other donations. Anderson’s friend Shane Conrad had connections at Panavision and borrowed a Panavision camera for a weekend (which would normally cost $6,000). Anderson hired a cinematographer, rented a Fisher camera dolly, and used his network to cast actors Miguel Ferrer, Scott Coffey, and Kirk Baltz. Producer Wendy Weidman rented a cheap diner in the Gorman Pass for the shoot.

Shooting was chaotic, as the crew previously had not worked together, there was no strong producer or cinematographer, and Anderson was inexperienced. The loan of the camera was extended from one weekend to six weeks, and the cinematographer was replaced. However, Anderson had a clear vision for his characters and scenes, and he required few takes.

== Impact ==
The film became a sensation on the short film festival circuit and was accepted to the 1993 Sundance Festival Shorts Program. After it was screened at the program, Anderson was invited to the 1994 Sundance Institute to develop a feature film. Anderson expanded the film into his first feature film, Hard Eight (1996).

== See also ==
- Twenty Bucks, a film with a similar concept
