= Hard Eight (film) =

1996 film by Paul Thomas Anderson

- Theatrical release poster
- Directed by: Paul Thomas Anderson
- Written by: Paul Thomas Anderson
- Based on: Cigarettes & Coffee by Paul Thomas Anderson
- Produced by: Robert Jones; John Lyons
- Starring: Philip Baker Hall; John C. Reilly; Gwyneth Paltrow; Samuel L. Jackson
- Cinematography: Robert Elswit
- Edited by: Barbara Tulliver
- Music by: Jon Brion; Michael Penn
- Production company: Rysher Entertainment
- Distributed by: The Samuel Goldwyn Company (North America); Rysher Entertainment (International)
- Release dates: January 20, 1996 (Sundance); February 28, 1997 (United States)
- Running time: 102 minutes
- Country: United States
- Language: English
- Budget: $3 million
- Box office: $222,806

Hard Eight (originally titled Sydney) is a 1996 American crime film written and directed by Paul Thomas Anderson in his feature directorial debut, and starring Philip Baker Hall, John C. Reilly, Gwyneth Paltrow, and Samuel L. Jackson. An expansion on Anderson's 1993 short film Cigarettes & Coffee, it follows a senior gambler as he passes on his techniques to an impoverished young man.

The film's title refers to a "hard eight", a wager in the casino game of craps. It premiered at the 1996 Sundance Film Festival and received mostly positive reviews.

== Plot ==
Sydney Brown, a well-dressed senior gambler, approaches John Finnegan, a vagrant young man sitting outside a diner in Sparks, Nevada. Sydney buys John a cup of coffee. John tells Sydney that he went bust in Las Vegas and needs $6,000 for his mother's funeral. They travel to Vegas, where Sydney teaches John how to gamble in a casino with just $150 so the casino will give him a free room.

Two years later, John and Sydney are in Reno, where John has become Sydney's protégé. Sydney displays a fatherly care for John, who has a new friend named Jimmy, a security worker. Additionally, the group is acquainted with Clementine, a cocktail waitress. After hours, Sydney sees Clementine at the hotel moonlighting as a prostitute, but prevents her rendezvous by bringing her to his and John's room. In the morning, Sydney asks John to take Clementine shopping.

That night, Sydney receives a frantic call from John and finds him and Clementine in a nearby motel with an unconscious man handcuffed to the bed. After the man failed to pay Clementine for sex, she and John called the man's wife and threatened to kill him if she did not bring $300. Sydney convinces John and Clementine that they will face serious charges if caught and urges them to leave town. As they also got married that day, they use their honeymoon as a cover story, while Sydney disposes of evidence.

The next day, Jimmy contacts Sydney and mentions that he has not seen any police. Jimmy explains that he has heard stories of Sydney's past crime life and learned that he killed John's father in Atlantic City, New Jersey. Pulling a gun, Jimmy threatens to tell John unless Sydney gives him $10,000. Sydney says that he can only give him $6,000, which he accepts.

John calls Sydney from a roadside phone to tell him that he and Clementine have almost made it to Niagara Falls. Sydney tells John that he loves him like a son and John says that he also loves him. Sydney watches outside Jimmy's house for him to leave, then breaks in and waits with one of Jimmy's guns. At the casino, Jimmy wins $2,000 on a hard eight. When he comes home, Sydney shoots Jimmy dead and takes his cash. The next morning, Sydney goes to the diner where he met John and covers his bloodstained shirt cuff with his jacket sleeve.

== Cast ==
- Philip Baker Hall as Sydney Brown
- John C. Reilly as John Finnegan
- Gwyneth Paltrow as Clementine
- Samuel L. Jackson as Jimmy
- Philip Seymour Hoffman as young craps player
- Melora Walters as Jimmy's girl

The main character, Sydney, was named after Hall's previous role in Midnight Run (1988). Anderson said that he cast Hoffman in a supporting role after seeing him in Scent of a Woman (1992). According to Hall, Hoffman improvised most of the dialogue his character says in his only scene in the film.

Hall, Walters, Reilly, and Hoffman later starred in Anderson's Boogie Nights (1997) and Magnolia (1999). In 2026, Nicolas Cage told The New York Times that he was offered a role in the film but he declined; he did not say which part he was offered.

== Production ==
Originally titled Sydney, it was Paul Thomas Anderson's first feature film and the expansion of the short film Cigarettes & Coffee. The film's title refers to a "hard eight", a wager in the casino game of craps that the shooter will roll two fours before a seven or any other combination totaling eight.

The film was influenced by and shares some plot elements with Jean-Pierre Melville's 1956 film Bob le flambeur (Bob the Gambler).

== Release and reception ==
The film premiered in the American Spectrum section at the 1996 Sundance Film Festival, and then in the Un Certain Regard section at the 1996 Cannes Film Festival. In 2018, Anderson said he was working on a Blu-ray release of the film. An Australian Blu-ray for the film was released by Via Vision Entertainment in October 2020.

Roger Ebert gave the film three and a half stars out of four, writing, "Movies like Hard Eight remind me of what original, compelling characters the movies can sometimes give us." Stephen Holden of The New York Times wrote that "Hard Eight is not a movie that wants to make a grand statement. It is really little more than a small resonant mood piece whose hard-bitten characters are difficult to like. But within its self-imposed limitations, it accomplishes most of what it sets out to do. And the acting is wonderfully understated, economical and unsentimental."

On Rotten Tomatoes, the film has an approval rating of 82% based on 89 reviews. The website's critical consensus reads, "An absorbing showcase for Philip Baker Hall, Paul Thomas Anderson's feature debut is a gamble that pays off handsomely." Metacritic, which uses a weighted average, assigned the film a score of 78 out of 100, based on 14 critics, indicating "generally favorable" reviews. It is described by some authors as a neo-noir film.

== See also ==
- List of films set in Las Vegas
