= Kirk Baltz =

American actor

- Born: William Kirk Baltz; September 14, 1959 (age 66); New York City, New York, U.S.
- Occupation: Actor
- Years active: 1989–present
- Known for: Marvin Nash in Reservoir Dogs

William Kirk Baltz (born September 14, 1959) is an American actor, best known for his role as police officer Marvin Nash in Quentin Tarantino's directorial debut, the 1992 film Reservoir Dogs.

== Life and career ==
Baltz was born in New York City, New York. He played police officer Marvin Nash in the 1992 film Reservoir Dogs. Baltz also starred in 1994's Natural Born Killers, as Roger. His other film credits include the 1990 drama film Dances With Wolves, the 1997 action film Face/Off and the 1998 political satire Bulworth. Baltz starred in Paul Thomas Anderson's directorial debut in the 1993 short film Cigarettes & Coffee.

Baltz has appeared in many made-for-television films and starred in the 1999 miniseries To Serve and Protect. He starred in the short-lived 1992 television series Human Target, and played sinister stalker Steve Roth in The Marla Hanson Story (1991).

He has made guest appearances on shows including Will and Grace, NYPD Blue, Seven Days, The Shield, 24, and Without a Trace. Baltz was the first actor to portray the Batman villain Clayface in live action, in the short-lived series Birds of Prey.

Baltz operates an acting school in Los Angeles, California; one of Baltz's students was professional wrestler Chris Jericho.

== Filmography ==
=== Film ===
Year	Title	Role	Notes
1989	American Stories, Food, Family and Philosophy	Unknown	
1989	On the Make	Richard	
1990	Dances with Wolves	Edwards	
1991	Out of the Rain	Val	
1992	Reservoir Dogs	Officer Marvin Nash	
1993	Skin Art	Will	
1993	Cigarettes & Coffee	Douglas Walker	Short film
1994	Natural Born Killers	Roger	
1997	Face/Off	Aldo Adino	
1997	Cold Around the Heart	Detective Logan	
1998	Bulworth	Debate Producer	
1998	Where's Marlowe?	Rivers	
2001	Rave Macbeth	Dean	
2003	A Little Crazy	Matt	
2007	Forfeit	Phil	
2007	Tattered Angel	Ben Miller	
2011	Assassins' Code	Chief Powers	
2011	The Lie	Joel	
2013	Parker	Bobby Hardwicke	
2013	Goodbye World	Radio Show Host	
2017	The Cutlass	Jake Soloman	

=== Television ===
Year	Title	Role	Notes
1991	The Marla Hanson Story	Steve Roth	Television film
1992	Human Target	Philo Marsden	7 episodes
1994	Probable Cause	John Sanchez	Television film
1994	NYPD Blue	Officer Daryl Guyce	2 episodes
1995	Kingfish: A Story of Huey P. Long	Frank Costello	Television film
1997	Bloodhounds	Charles Veasey	Television film
1998	Seven Days	Dr. Jonathan Axelrad	Episode: "Come Again?"
1999	To Serve and Protect	Donald Curtis	2 episodes
2000	NYPD Blue	Detective Jay Morrison	Episode: "The Naked Are the Dead"
2000	The Fugitive	Ned Cornell	Episode: "Liar's Poker"
2001	Level 9	Dave McCormick	Episode: "Avatar"
2001	Warden of Red Rock	Gil Macon	Television film
2002	Will & Grace	Glenn Gabriel	Episode: "Grace in the Hole"
2002	The Shield	William Greeley	Episode: "The Spread"
2002	24	Teddy Hanlin	2 episodes
2002	The Division	Jack Hurley	Episode: "Full Moon"
2003	The Guardian	Ray Howard	Episode: "The Weight"
2003	Birds of Prey	Clayface	Episode: "Feat of Clay"
2004	Without a Trace	Scott Dorn	Episode: "Exposure"
2013	NCIS: Los Angeles	Kelvin C. Griffin	Episode: "Fallout"
2015	Wicked City	Detective Artie Bukowski	6 episodes
2018	Snowfall	Jim Volpe	Episode: "The Offer"

=== Video games ===
Year	Title	Role	Notes
2007	The Darkness	Anthony Estacado	Voice
2009	[PROTOTYPE]	Lieutenant Christopher Costanzo	Voice
2010	Mafia II	Additional voices	Voice
