= Frederick Staples Benedict =

American architect

- Born: 1861
- Died: January 8, 1936 (aged 75); Brooklyn, New York
- Education: Cornell University College of Architecture, Art, and Planning
- Occupation: Architect

Frederick Staples Benedict (1861 – January 8, 1936) was an American architect.

For more than thirty years, he was a partner in the firm of York and Sawyer. He was a graduate of Cornell University College of Architecture, Art, and Planning. Among the important works of his firm which he directed were the New York Athletic Club, United States Post Office at Orange, New Jersey, First Bank and Trust Company at Utica, New York, Brooklyn Trust Company, Rutgers College gymnasium, work at Vassar College and the University of Michigan. He belonged to the American Institute of Architects and the Cornell Club. He died on January 8, 1936, in Brooklyn, New York.
