= American Security and Trust Company Building =

Historic building in Washington, D.C

- American Security and Trust Company
- U.S. National Register of Historic Places
- D.C. Inventory of Historic Sites
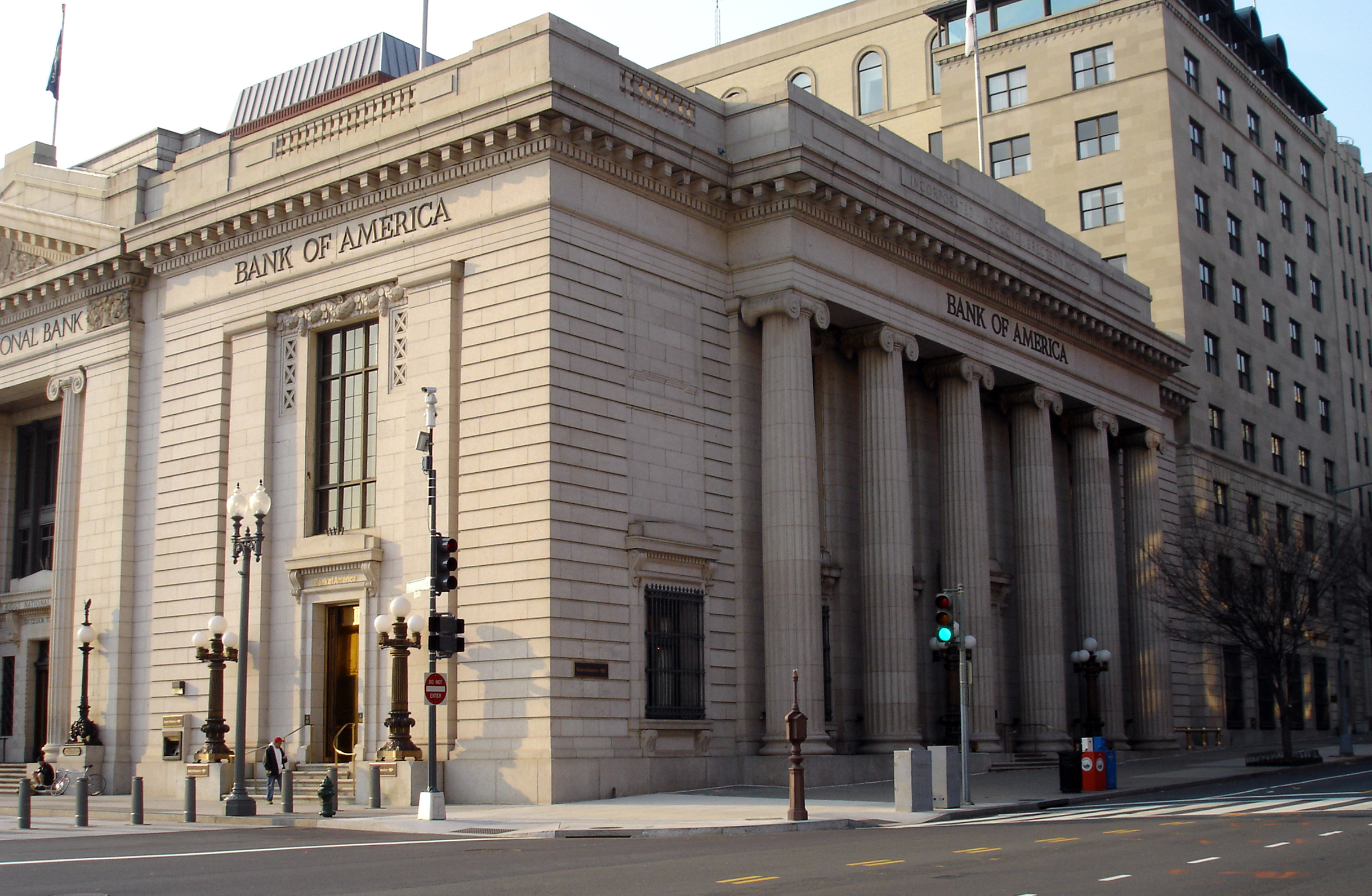
- American Security and Trust Company Building in 2005

- Location within Central Washington, D.C.
- Location: 1501 Pennsylvania Avenue, NW, Washington, D.C.
- Coordinates: 38°53′56.5″N 77°2′2.1″W
- Area: 6,989 square feet (649 m^{2})
- Built: 1904–1905
- Architect: York and Sawyer
- Architectural style: Neoclassical
- NRHP reference No.: 73002070

Significant dates
- Added to NRHP: July 16, 1973
- Designated DCIHS: November 8, 1964

The American Security and Trust Company Building is a Neoclassical bank office in Washington, D.C., designed by the architectural firm of York and Sawyer. It was listed on the National Register of Historic Places in 1973.

== Design ==
The building's neoclassical exterior closely matches that of the Riggs National Bank building next door, also designed by York and Sawyer and completed in 1902, so they are sometimes considered a single building. The east facade of the building presents a multiple bay arrangement with two plain bays flanking a hexastyle portico of six Ionic columns and entablature, while the narrower and plainer south face has a single bay with two plain Doric pilasters flanking the entrance in a shallow recess. The parapet conceals three skylights. Although the exterior has two rows of windows, the interior is a single floor, also decorated in the neoclassical style; it was remodeled in 1931–1932 but retained essentially the same form except for the removal of a pair of balconies and new openings into the adjoining annex which was constructed at the same time to the north. A basement floor formerly contained vaults, but with the construction of the annex, these were moved to the adjoining building. The building exterior is constructed of granite ashlars with deep horizontal joints at the corners, creating a striped effect; the interior is largely faced in various marbles.

== History ==
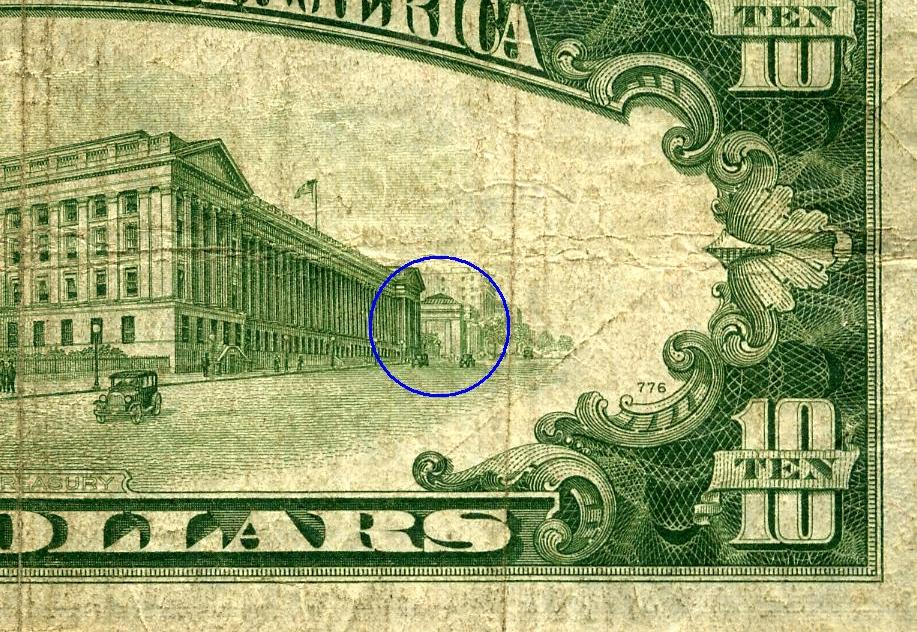
The American Security Bank building appeared on the back of the $10 bill, just beyond and to the right of the Treasury Building.

American Security Bank was founded in 1889 in Alexandria, Virginia, as a banking and trust concern, operating a branch in the District of Columbia at 1419 G Street, NW; the following year it reincorporated in the District and moved to 1405 G Street. Its president was Charles James Bell (Dublin, April 12, 1858 – October 1, 1929), nephew of Alexander Graham Bell. It was the second trust company established in the District and the first to offer a women's department. By 1903, the business had grown so that a new location was sought again. The present location (a block from Lafayette Square and part of the Lafayette Square Historic District) was selected, and construction began in 1904. The design was praised in the banking press and featured in The American Architect and Building News in 1905.

The building now houses a branch of Bank of America as a result of the latter's merger with NationsBank, which purchased MNC Financial in 1993. MNC had purchased American Security Bank in 1987 but continued to operate it under the original name.

Due to its location immediately north of the Treasury Building, the building appeared on the back of the ten dollar bill for many years, a fact American Security took advantage of in its advertising with the slogan, "Right on the money".

== See also ==
- National Register of Historic Places listings in Washington, D.C.
