= Philip Baker Hall =

American actor (1931–2022)

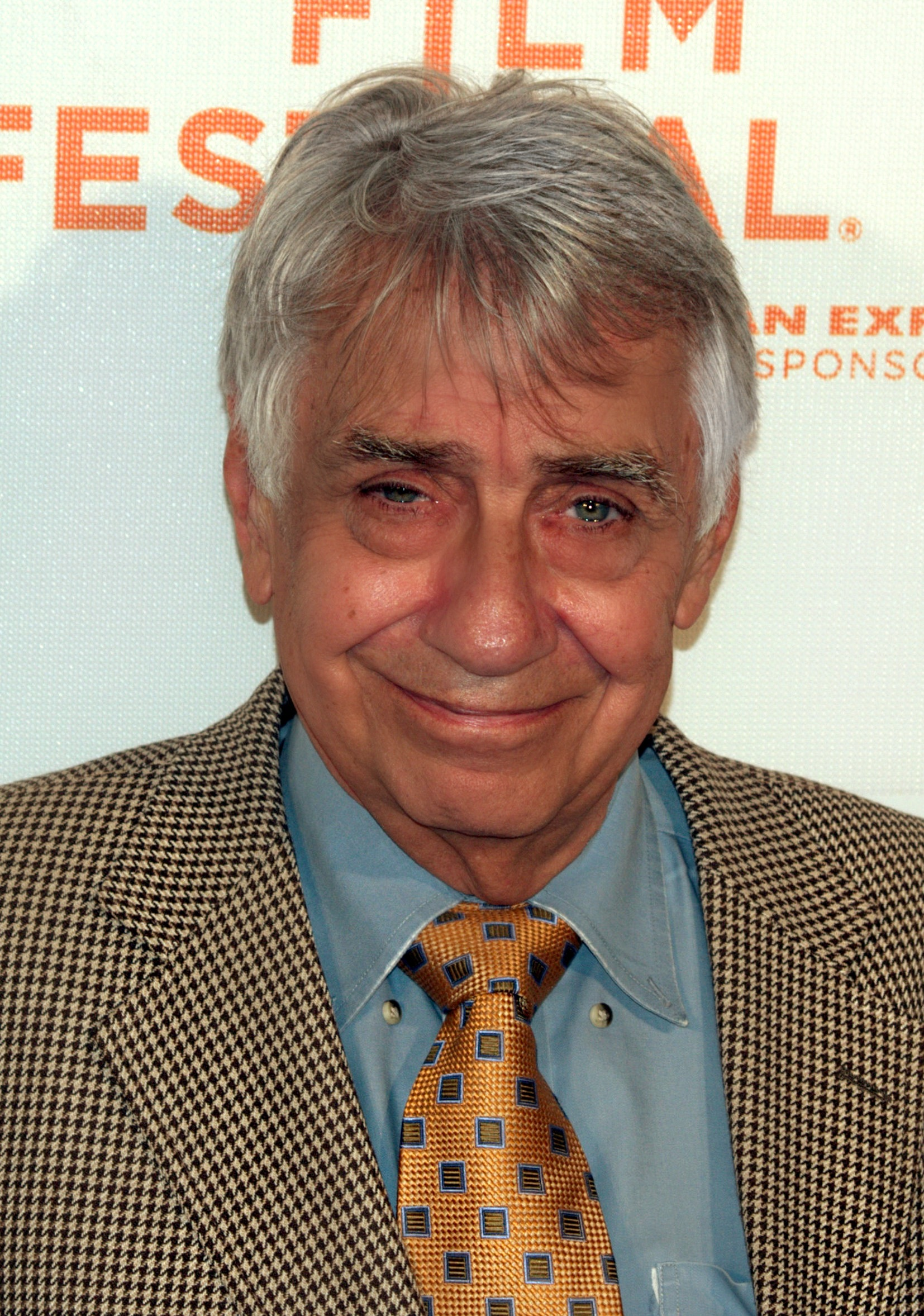
- Hall in 2009
- Born: September 10, 1931; Toledo, Ohio, U.S.
- Died: June 12, 2022 (aged 90); Glendale, California, U.S.
- Resting place: Forest Lawn Memorial Park
- Occupation: Actor
- Years active: 1960–2021
- Spouses: Mary-Ella Holst (m. 1955; div. 1966) Dianne Lewis (m. 1973; div. 1976) Holly Wolfle (m. 1988)
- Children: 4

Philip Baker Hall (September 10, 1931 – June 12, 2022) was an American character actor. He is known for his collaborations with Paul Thomas Anderson, including Hard Eight (1996), Boogie Nights (1997), and Magnolia (1999). He also starred in leading roles in films, such as Secret Honor (1984) and Duck (2005). Hall had supporting roles in many films, including Midnight Run (1988), Say Anything... (1989), The Truman Show (1998), The Talented Mr. Ripley (1999), The Insider (1999), The Contender (2000), Bruce Almighty (2003), Dogville (2003), Zodiac (2007), 50/50 (2011), and Argo (2012). He received an Independent Spirit Award nomination for Best Male Lead for his role in Hard Eight and two Screen Actors Guild Award nominations for Outstanding Performance by an Ensemble Cast in a Motion Picture for Boogie Nights and Magnolia.

Hall is also known for his prolific work on television. His early television work included M*A*S*H; Murder, She Wrote; and Cheers. One of his most memorable television roles was as Lt. Joe Bookman, the "library cop", in Seinfeld. He had recurring roles in The Practice, The West Wing, Curb Your Enthusiasm, Modern Family, and BoJack Horseman.

== Early life ==
Hall was born on September 10, 1931, in Toledo, Ohio. His mother was Alice Birdene (née McDonald), and his father, William Alexander Hall, was a factory worker from Montgomery, Alabama. He attended the University of Toledo. He served in Germany as a United States Army translator and as a high school teacher.

== Career ==
After his film debut Cowards, he joined the Los Angeles Theatre Center. His first television role was on an episode of Good Times. Hall guest starred in episodes of M*A*S*H and Man from Atlantis. He had over 200 guest roles since 1977. He played Richard Nixon in the one-character film Secret Honor, reprising the role he had created during the play's original Off-Broadway run. Roger Ebert said about Hall and the film: "Nixon is portrayed by Philip Baker Hall, an actor previously unknown to me, with such savage intensity, such passion, such venom, such scandal, that we cannot turn away. Hall looks a little like the real Nixon; he could be a cousin, and he sounds a little like him. That's close enough. This is not an impersonation, it's a performance." Vincent Canby of The New York Times also praised Hall's "immense performance, which is as astonishing and risky ― for the chances the actor takes and survives ― as that of the Oscar-winning F. Murray Abraham in Amadeus."

In the 1980s, Hall co-starred in various films in supporting roles, including Nothing in Common (1986), Midnight Run (1988), Say Anything... and Ghostbusters II (both 1989). His television appearances included Family Ties, Falcon Crest, Murder, She Wrote, and Cheers. He played "Lt. Joe Bookman", a detective pursuing a long-overdue library book in the Seinfeld episodes, "The Library" and "The Finale". His first Seinfeld appearance led him to be widely lauded as one of the best guest stars on the series, and led to many other jobs.

Hall contributed an opening narration, a parody of the announcements one would hear on Magnetic Reference Laboratory's calibration tapes for analogue tape recorders, on 1000 Hurts, the 2000 album by Chicago post-punk band Shellac.

Hall starred in Paul Thomas Anderson's short film Cigarettes & Coffee (1993), which was adapted into Anderson's directorial debut film Hard Eight (1996). For the film, Hall played a senior gambler who mentors a homeless man (John C. Reilly). Ebert of the Chicago Sun-Times said about Hall, "Here is another great performance. He is a man who has been around, who knows casinos and gambling, who finds himself attached to three people he could easily have avoided, who thinks before he acts." Hall was nominated for the Independent Spirit Award for Best Male Lead. He later starred in Anderson's other films Boogie Nights (1997) and Magnolia (1999). He was nominated for two Screen Actors Guild Awards for Outstanding Performance by a Cast in a Motion Picture. Hall starred with Philip Seymour Hoffman in four films.

Hall had turns in a variety of films in the 1990s, including The Rock (1996), Buddy (1997), Air Force One (1997), The Truman Show (1998), Enemy of the State (1998), The Insider (1999), and The Talented Mr. Ripley (1999). He played Captain Diel in the Rush Hour trilogy (1998-2007) (though his scenes were cut from Rush Hour 2 and he was uncredited for the scene in Rush Hour 3). He co-starred in other films in the 2000s, including Dogville (2003), Zodiac (2007), and Argo (2012). Hall had prominent roles in Rules of Engagement (2000), The Contender (2000), Bruce Almighty (2003), In Good Company (2004), Duck (2005), The Amityville Horror (2005), The Matador (2005), You Kill Me (2007), All Good Things (2010), 50/50 (2001), and The Sum of All Fears (2002).

Hall's later television appearances included The Practice, Without a Trace, The West Wing, Madam Secretary, and BoJack Horseman. He starred in the sitcom The Loop. He guest starred in the animated series The Life & Times of Tim. He played a physician in Curb Your Enthusiasm, and appeared in Modern Family. He appeared in an episode of The Newsroom and in a Holiday Inn commercial. For the short film Dear Chickens (2018), he won best actor at Los Angeles Short Festival and at Filmets Badalona Film Festival in Barcelona.

Hall also undertook stage work in New York and Los Angeles, but did not appear on Broadway.

== Personal life and death ==
Hall had two daughters with his first wife, Mary-Ella Holst. He later married Holly Wolfle, with whom he had two daughters. He also had four grandchildren and a brother.

Hall died of emphysema at his home in Glendale, California, on June 12, 2022, at the age of 90.

== Filmography ==
=== Film ===
Year	Title	Role	Notes	Ref.
1970	Cowards	Father Reis		
1974	Throw Out the Anchor!	Ryan	Credited as "Phillip Hall"	
1978	Coma	Doctor		
1980	The Man with Bogart's Face	Dr. Inman		
1981	Dream On!			
1982	The Last Reunion	Mike Sills		
1984	Secret Honor	Richard Nixon		
1986	Nothing in Common	Colonial Airlines Executive	Uncredited	
1987	Three O'Clock High	Detective Mulvahill		
1988	Midnight Run	Sidney		
1989	Say Anything...	IRS Boss		
1989	How I Got into College	Dean Patterson		
1989	Ghostbusters II	Police Commissioner		
1989	An Innocent Man	Judge Kenneth Lavet		
1991	Blue Desert	Joe		
1992	Live Wire	Senator Thyme		
1993	Cigarettes & Coffee	Sydney	Short film	
1994	The Last Laugh	William T.	Short film	
1995	Kiss of Death	Big Junior Brown		
1996	Eye for an Eye	Sidney Hughes		
1996	Hard Eight	Sydney		
1996	The Rock	Chief Justice	Uncredited	
1996	The Little Death	Detective Snyder		
1996	Hit Me	Lenny Ish	AKA The Ice Cream Dimension	
1997	Buddy	Minister		
1997	Air Force One	U.S. Attorney General Andrew Ward		
1997	Boogie Nights	Floyd Gondolli		
1998	Sour Grapes	Mr. Bell		
1998	The Truman Show	Network Executive		
1998	Judas Kiss	Pobby Malavero		
1998	Rush Hour	Captain Diel		
1998	Enemy of the State	Mark Silverberg, Attorney	Uncredited	
1998	Prequel	Vaughn		
1998	Psycho	Sheriff Chambers		
1999	Let the Devil Wear Black	Sol Hirsch		
1999	Cradle Will Rock	Gray Mathers		
1999	Implicated	John Swayer		
1999	The Insider	Don Hewitt		
1999	Magnolia	Jimmy Gator		
1999	The Talented Mr. Ripley	Alvin MacCarron		
2000	Rules of Engagement	General H. Lawrence Hodges		
2000	The Contender	Oscar Billings		
2000	Lost Souls	Father James		
2001	Rush Hour 2	Captain Diel	Scenes deleted	
2002	The Sum of All Fears	Defense Secretary David Becker		
2002	A Gentleman's Game	Charlie Logan		
2003	Die, Mommie, Die!	Sol Sussman		
2003	Dogville	Tom Edison Sr.		
2003	Bruce Almighty	Jack Baylor		
2003	A House on a Hill	Harry Mayfield		
2004	In Good Company	Eugene Kalb		
2005	The Matador	Mr. Randy		
2005	A Buck's Worth		Voice; Short film	
2005	Duck	Arthur Pratt		
2005	The Amityville Horror	Father Callaway		
2005	The Zodiac	Chief Frank Perkins		
2006	The Shaggy Dog	Lance Strictland		
2006	The TV Set	Vernon Maxwell		
2006	Islander	Popper		
2007	Zodiac	Sherwood Morrill		
2007	You Kill Me	Roman Krzeminski		
2007	Rush Hour 3	Captain William Diel	Uncredited	
2009	The Lodger	Captain Smith		
2009	Fired Up!	Coach Byrnes		
2009	Wonderful World	The Man		
2010	All Good Things	Malvern Bump		
2011	The Chicago 8	Judge Julius Hoffman		
2011	Mr. Popper's Penguins	Franklin		
2011	50/50	Alan Lombardo		
2012	Bending the Rules	Herb Gold		
2012	People Like Us	Ike Rafferty		
2012	Departure Date	Old Jake		
2012	Dog Eat Dog	Old man	Short film	
2012	Argo	CIA Director Stansfield Turner	Uncredited	
2013	Bad Words	Dr. William Bowman		
2014	Playing It Cool	Granddad		
2017	Person to Person	Jimmy		
2017	The Last Word	Edward	Final film role	
2018	Dear Chickens	Emil	Short film	

=== Television ===
Year	Title	Role	Notes	Ref.
1975	The Last Survivors	Attorney	Television film	
1975; 1978	Emergency!	Oliver Warren / Dr. Scott	2 episodes	
1976	Good Times	Motel Owner	Episode: "J.J.'s Fiancee: Part 2"	
1976	Mayday at 40,000 Feet!	Reporter	Television film	
1976–1977	Visions	Boyle / Severson	2 episodes	
1977	Man from Atlantis	George	Episode: "Man from Atlantis"	
1977	The Hostage Heart	Dr. Harvey Fess	Television film	
1977	Kill Me If You Can	Phillips	Television film	
1977	M*A*S*H	Sergeant Hacker	Episode: "The Light That Failed"	
1978	The Fitzpatricks	Bertram	Episode: "A Living Wage"	
1978	The Bastard	Shopkeeper	Miniseries	
1978	Terror Out of the Sky	Starrett	Television film	
1979	Samurai	Professor Owens	Television film	
1980	The Waltons	Major Gordon	Episode: "The Furlough"	
1980	The Night the Bridge Fell Down	Warren Meech	Television film	
1980	It's a Living	Man in Hotel Room	Episode: "The Lois Affair"	
1980	Riding for the Pony Express	Mr. Durfee	Television film	
1981	This House Possessed	Clerk	Television film	
1982	McClain's Law	Mr. Harris	Episode: "Takeover"	
1982	Quincy, M.E.	Deputy DA Marty Shell; Captain Rasmussen	2 episodes	
1982	Cagney & Lacey	Lieutenant Sweeny	Episode: "Hot Line"	
1982	T. J. Hooker	Judge Wallace	Episode: "A Cry for Help"	
1982	Seven Brides for Seven Brothers	Prosecutor / Wilcox	2 episodes	
1982	Games Mother Never Taught You	Lester Greene	Television film	
1984	Benson	Harrison Fowler	Episode: "The Election"	
1984	Lottery!		Episode: "Houston: Duffy's Choice"	
1985	Hardcastle and McCormick	Jack Marsh	Episode: "Too Rich and Too Thin"	
1986	Who Is Julia?	Dean May	Television film	
1987	Mariah	James Malone	7 episodes	
1987	The Spirit	Sevrin	Television film	
1987	Miami Vice	Judge DeLaporte	Episode: "Contempt of Court"	
1988	Goddess of Love	Detective Charles	Television film	
1988	Family Ties	Dr. Harrison	3 episodes	
1989	A Cry for Help: The Tracey Thurman Story	Judge Blumenfeld	Television film	
1989	Incident at Dark River	Dr. Leo Manus	Television film	
1989–1990	Falcon Crest	Ed Meyers	13 episodes	
1990	Matlock	Judge	Episode: "The Mother"	
1990	Bagdad Cafe	Herb	Episode: "This Bird Has Flown"	
1991	Murder, She Wrote	Len Costner	Episode: "Moving Violation"	
1991	L.A. Law	Tom Baker	Episode: "He's a Crowd"	
1991	Equal Justice	Judge S.E. Cleveland	Episode: "Do the Wrong Thing"	
1991	Dark Justice	Winchester Keller	Episode: "The Neutralizing Factor"	
1991–1992	Civil Wars	Judge Bianchi	3 episodes	
1991, 1998	Seinfeld	Lt. Joe Bookman	2 episodes: "The Library" and "The Finale"	
1992	A Thousand Heroes	Sam Gochenour	Television film; AKA Crash Landing: The Rescue of Flight 232	
1992	Stormy Weathers	Dr. Comden	Television film	
1992	Nurses	Mr. Todd	Episode: "Playing Doctor"	
1993	Cheers	City Councilman Kevin Fogerty	Episode: "Woody Gets an Election"	
1993	Bob	Jeweler	Episode: "Have Yourself a Married Little Christmas"	
1994	M.A.N.T.I.S.	"Smitty"	Television film	
1994	Empty Nest	Jerod	Episode: "Brotherly Shove"	
1994	The Good Life	Mr. Humphreys	Episode: "Melissa the Thief"	
1994	Roswell	Roswell General	Television film	
1994	Madman of the People	Kent	Episode: "All Work and No Play Makes Jack a Mad Boy"	
1994	Chicago Hope	Mr. Wellington	Episode: "You Gotta Have Heart"	
1994	Hardball	Beanball McGee	Episode: "Lee's Bad, Bad Day"	
1994	Without Warning	Dr. Kurt Lowden	Television film	
1996	Life's Work	Judge Conklin	Episode: "Contempt"	
1996	The John Larroquette Show	Mr. Frank	Episode: "Napping to Success"	
1997	3rd Rock from the Sun	President Dewey	Episode: "Proud Dick"	
1997	The Practice	Judge Joseph Vinocour	4 episodes	
1997–1998	Millennium	Group Elder	2 episodes	
1997–1998	Michael Hayes	William Vaughn	20 episodes	
1998	Tempting Fate	Dr. Bardwell	Television film	
1998	Witness to the Mob	Toddo Aurello	Television film	
1998	L.A. Doctors	Vincent Cattano	Episode: "Fear of Flying"	
1999	Partners	Scarpatti	Pilot	
2000	The Fugitive	Stuart Kimble	Episode: "St. Christopher's Prayer"	
2000	Jackie Bouvier Kennedy Onassis	Aristotle Onassis	Television film	
2000, 2002	Baby Blues	Mr. Thompson / Mr. Saunders	Voice; 2 episodes	
2001	Pasadena	George Reese Greeley	7 episodes	
2001	Loomis	"Big Jack" Caruso	Unaired pilot	
2002	Path to War	Everett Dirksen	Television film	
2002	Night Visions	Dennis Brascom	Episode: "Cargo/Switch"	
2002	Without a Trace	Noah Ridder	Episode: "Silent Partner"	
2003	Everwood	Dr. Donald Douglas	3 episodes	
2004	Monk	Salvatore Lucarelli	Episode: "Mr. Monk Meets the Godfather"	
2004	Boston Legal	Ernie Dell	Episode: "Head Cases"	
2004	The West Wing	Senator Matt Hunt	2 episodes	
2004, 2009	Curb Your Enthusiasm	Dr. Morrison	2 episodes	
2005	Mrs. Harris	Arthur Schulte	Television film	
2006–2007	The Loop	Russ	17 episodes	
2007	Big Love	Ned Johanssen	Episode: "Take Me as I Am"	
2007	Wildlife	Arnie	Unaired pilot	
2008	Psych	Irving Parker	Episode: "Dis-Lodged"	
2008	Worst Week	Reverend Lowell	2 episodes	
2009	True Jackson, VP	Mr. Jenkins	Episode: "Flirting with Fame"	
2010	The Life & Times of Tim	Norman Walker (voice)	Episode: "London Calling/Novelist"	
2010	Warren the Ape	Dr. Ralph Schwartz	Episode: "Rock Opera"	
2011–2012	Modern Family	Walt Kleezak	3 episodes	
2012	The Newsroom	Bryce DeLancy	Episode: "The 112th Congress"	
2012	Childrens Hospital	Josef Mengele	Episode: "A Year in the Life"	
2012	Ruth & Erica	Harry	8 episodes	
2013	Clear History	McKenzie	Television film	
2014	Rake	Mitch Markham	Episode: "Remembrance of Taxis Past"	
2014	Altman	Himself	Documentary	
2015	Madam Secretary	Ezra Helsinger	Episode: "The Necessary Art"	
2015	BoJack Horseman	Hank Hippopopalous	Voice; 2 episodes	
2016	Second Chance	Old Jimmy Pritchard	5 episodes	
2017	Room 104	Charlie	Episode: "My Love"	
2018	Corporate	Arthur Stockheed	Episode: "Powerpoint of Death"	
2020	Messiah	Zelman Katz	Final role, 6 episodes	

=== Theatre ===
Year	Title	Role	Playwright	Venue	Ref.
1960	The Fantasticks	Hucklebee	Tom Jones	Sullivan Street Playhouse, Off-Broadway	
1965	In White America	Performer	Martin Duberman	Players Theatre, Off-Broadway	
1975	Gorky	Gorky	Steve Tesich	American Place Theatre, Off-Broadway	
1979	The Chicago Conspiracy Trial	Judge Hoffman	Ron Sossi and Frank Condon	Odyssey Theatre Ensemble, Los Angeles	
1983	In the Matter of J. Robert Oppenheimer	Herbert S. Marks	Heinar Kipphardt	Odyssey Theatre Ensemble, Los Angeles	
1983	Secret Honor	Richard Nixon	Donald Freed	Provincetown Playhouse, Off-Broadway	
1990	The Crucible	Thomas Danforth	Arthur Miller	Los Angeles Theatre Company	
1995	The Homecoming	Max	Harold Pinter	Matrix Theatre, Los Angeles	
2000	American Buffalo	Don	David Mamet	Donmar Warehouse, West End	
2000	American Buffalo	Don	David Mamet	Linda Gross Theatre, Off-Broadway	

== Accolades ==
Year	Award	Category	Nominated work	Result	Ref.
1996	Independent Spirit Award	Best Male Lead	Hard Eight	Nominated	
1997	Screen Actors Guild Award	Outstanding Cast – Motion Picture	Boogie Nights	Nominated	
1997	Florida Film Critics Circle	Best Ensemble	Boogie Nights	Won	
1999	Screen Actors Guild Award	Outstanding Cast – Motion Picture	Magnolia	Nominated	
1999	Florida Film Critics Circle	Best Ensemble	Magnolia	Won	
2001	Broadcast Film Critics Association	Alan J. Pakula Award	The Contender	Won	
2012	Hollywood Film Awards	Best Ensemble	Argo	Won	
