= York and Sawyer =

American architectural firm (1898–1949)

York and Sawyer was an American architectural firm active between 1898 and 1949, subsequently as the Office of York & Sawyer, Architects; Kiff, Colean, Voss & Souder into the mid-1950s; and was succeeded by Kiff, Colean, Voss & Souder, who were active as late as 1965. The firms' early work is exemplary of Beaux-Arts architecture as it was practiced in the United States. The original partners Edward York and Philip Sawyer both trained in the office of McKim, Mead & White in the 1890s. In 1898, they established their independent firm, based in New York City.

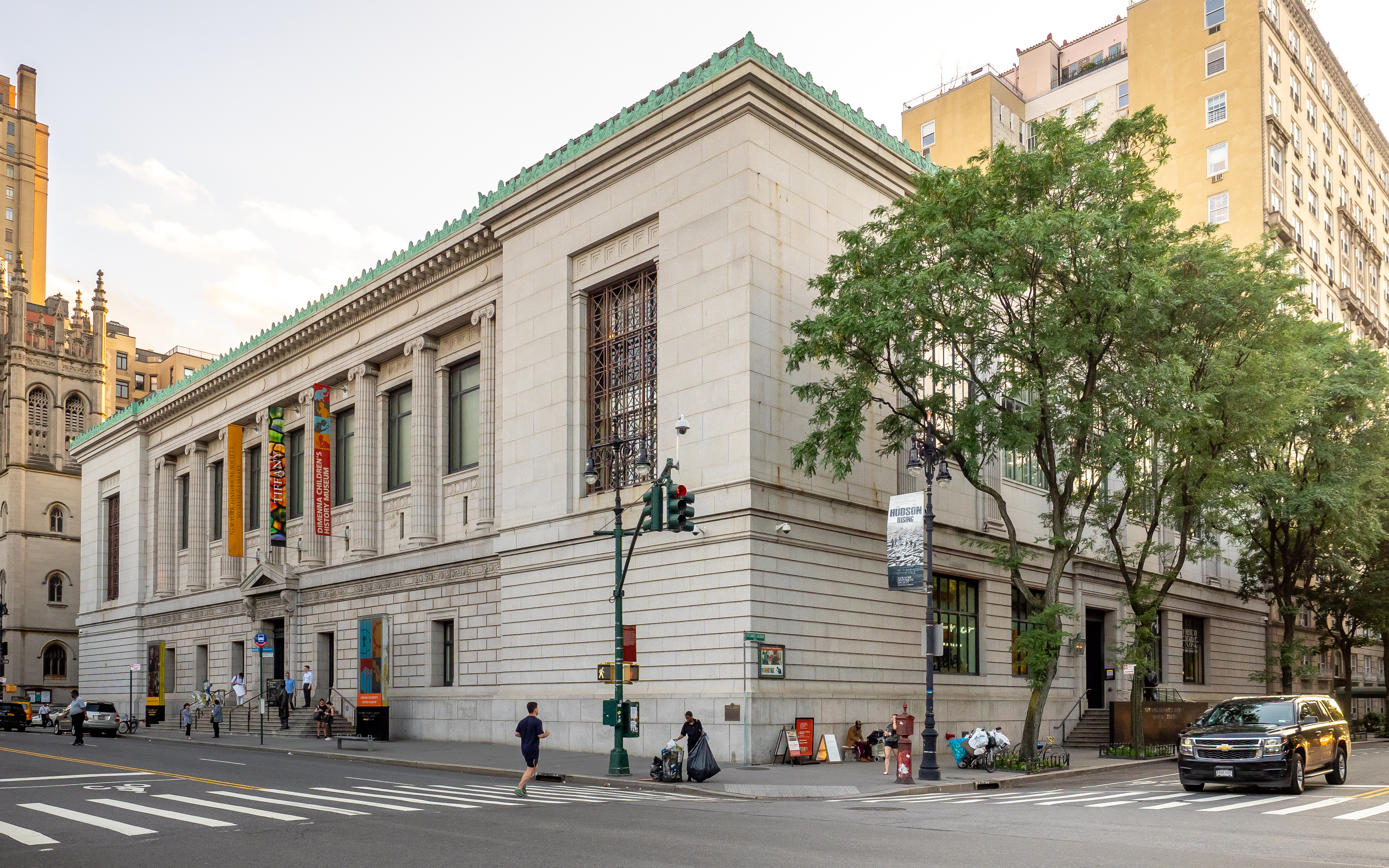
New-York Historical Society, designed by York and Sawyer in 1908

Their structure for the New-York Historical Society (1908) was extended in 1938 by Walker & Gillette. Their ability to organize, separate and coordinate mixed uses in a building is exemplified by their massive New York Athletic Club.

York and Sawyer became known as specialists in the design of banks and hospitals. Original architectural drawings by York and Sawyer are held in the Dept. of Drawings & Archives at Avery Architectural and Fine Arts Library at Columbia University in New York City. Their successor firm, Kiff, Colean, Voss & Souder, were leaders in hospital design.

== Works ==
All but three projects are located in the US. Two are in Canada (Montreal and Toronto) and one is in Argentina (Buenos Aires).

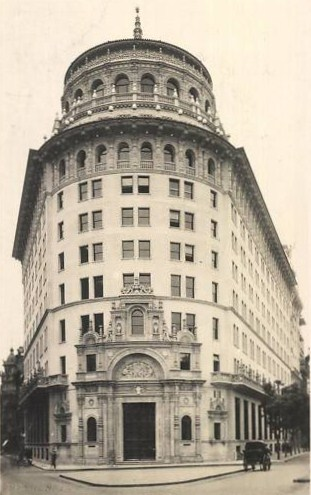
Edificio First National Bank of Boston, Buenos Aires

- Rockefeller Hall of Vassar College (1897, later enlarged and renovated in 1916 and 1940)
- Riggs National Bank, Washington, D.C. (1899)
- Egbert Starr Library of Middlebury College, now known as the Axinn Center at Starr Library (1900, enlarged 1927)
- Swift Hall of Vassar College (1900, remodeled 1941)
- New England Hall of Vassar College (1901, enlarged 1919, renovated 2001)
- The Chemists' Club, 52 East 41st Street, New York City (1903; adapted as the Dylan Hotel in 2000)
- American Security and Trust Company Building, Washington, D.C. (1905)
- New-York Historical Society (1908, enlarged by Walker & Gillette in 1938)
- Metcalf House of Vassar College (1915)
- Pratt House of Vassar College (1916)
- Brooklyn Trust Company Building, 177 Montague Street (1913–1916)
- The Martha Cook Building, University of Michigan (1915)
- Rhode Island Hospital Trust Building, Providence, Rhode Island (1917)
- The Law Quadrangle at the University of Michigan. (1924-1933)
- U.S. Assay Office Building, 30 Wall Street, New York City (1919)
- Federal Reserve Bank of New York, 33 Liberty Street New York City (1919–1924)
- Bowery Savings Bank Building, 110 East 42nd Street New York City (1921–1923)
- Greenwich Savings Bank Building, 1352 Broadway (1922–24)
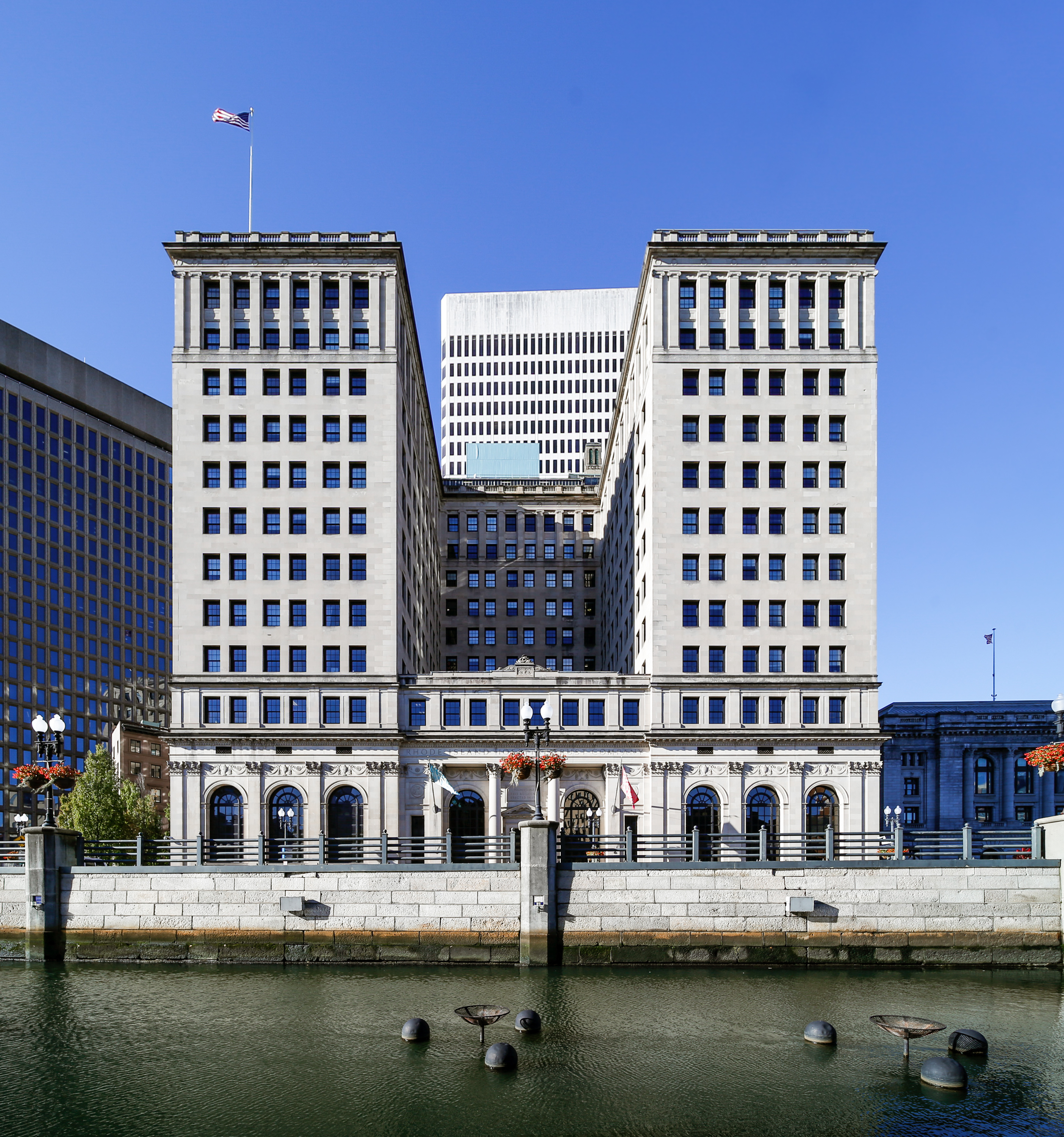
- Rhode Island Hospital Trust Building, 1917
  Rhode Island Hospital Trust Building, Providence, Rhode Island (1917)
- Pershing Square Building, 125 Park Avenue, New York City (1923)
- Agricultural Insurance Company Building, Watertown, New York (1923)
- 860 Park Avenue, New York City (1925)
- Kendrick House of Vassar College (1927)
- Old Royal Bank Building, Montreal (1926–1928 with S.G. Davenport of Montreal)
- Transportation Building, 225 Broadway, New York City (1927)
- Central Savings Bank Building (1928) 2100 Broadway, New York City
- Edificio First National Bank of Boston, (1928) built by Paul Chambers and Louis Thomas
- Blodgett Hall of Euthenics of Vassar College (1928, enlarged 1998)
- Commerce Court North (1931, consulting architects with Darling and Pearson), Toronto
- Brick Presbyterian Church, New York City (1938)
- Herbert C. Hoover Building, Washington DC (1927-1932)
- Demarest Hall, Rutgers University, New Brunswick, New Jersey (1951)
- Miss Hall's School (1924) 492 Holmes Rd, Pittsfield, MA https://www.misshalls.org/

== Gallery ==
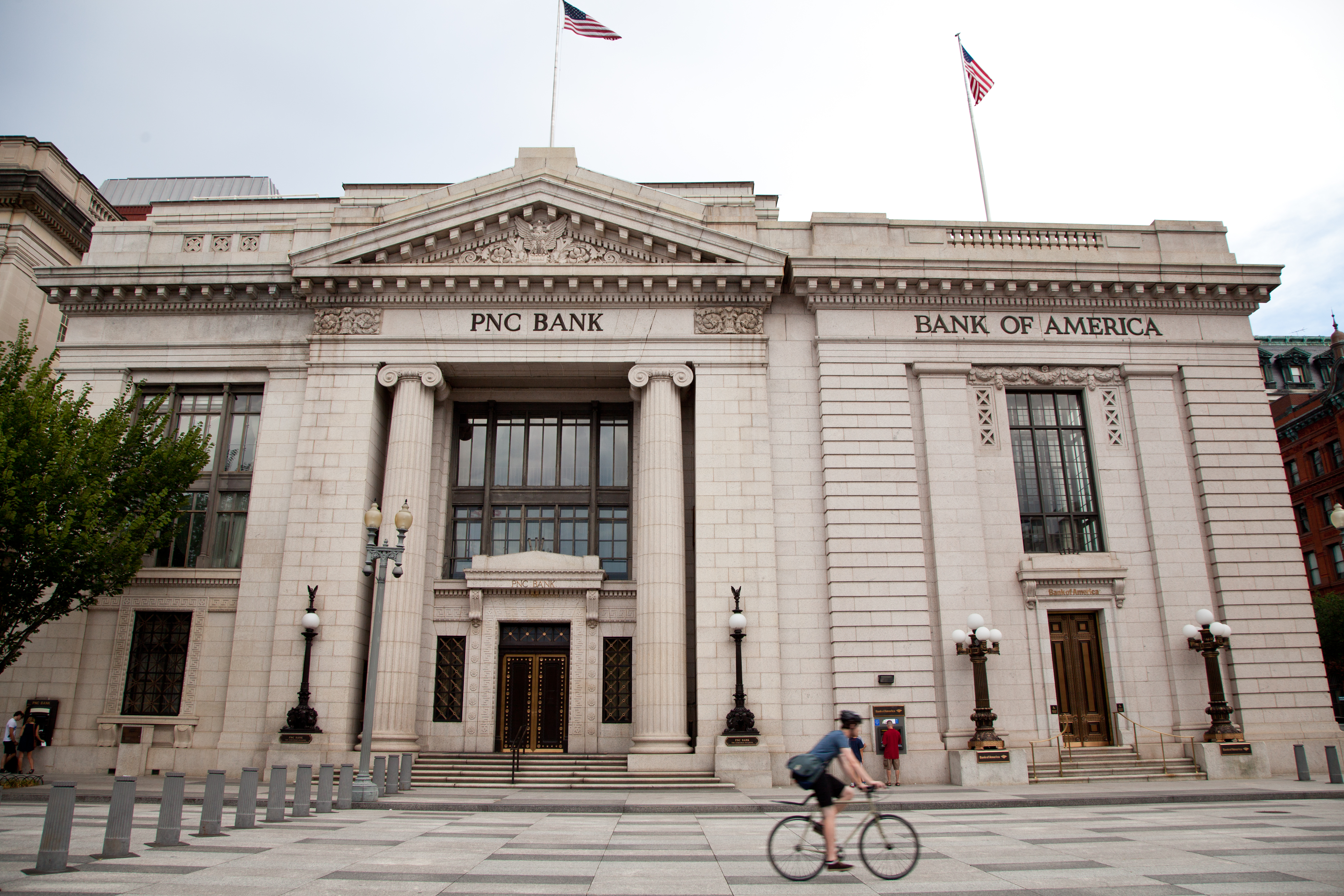
American Security and Trust Company Building, Washington, D.C. (1905)

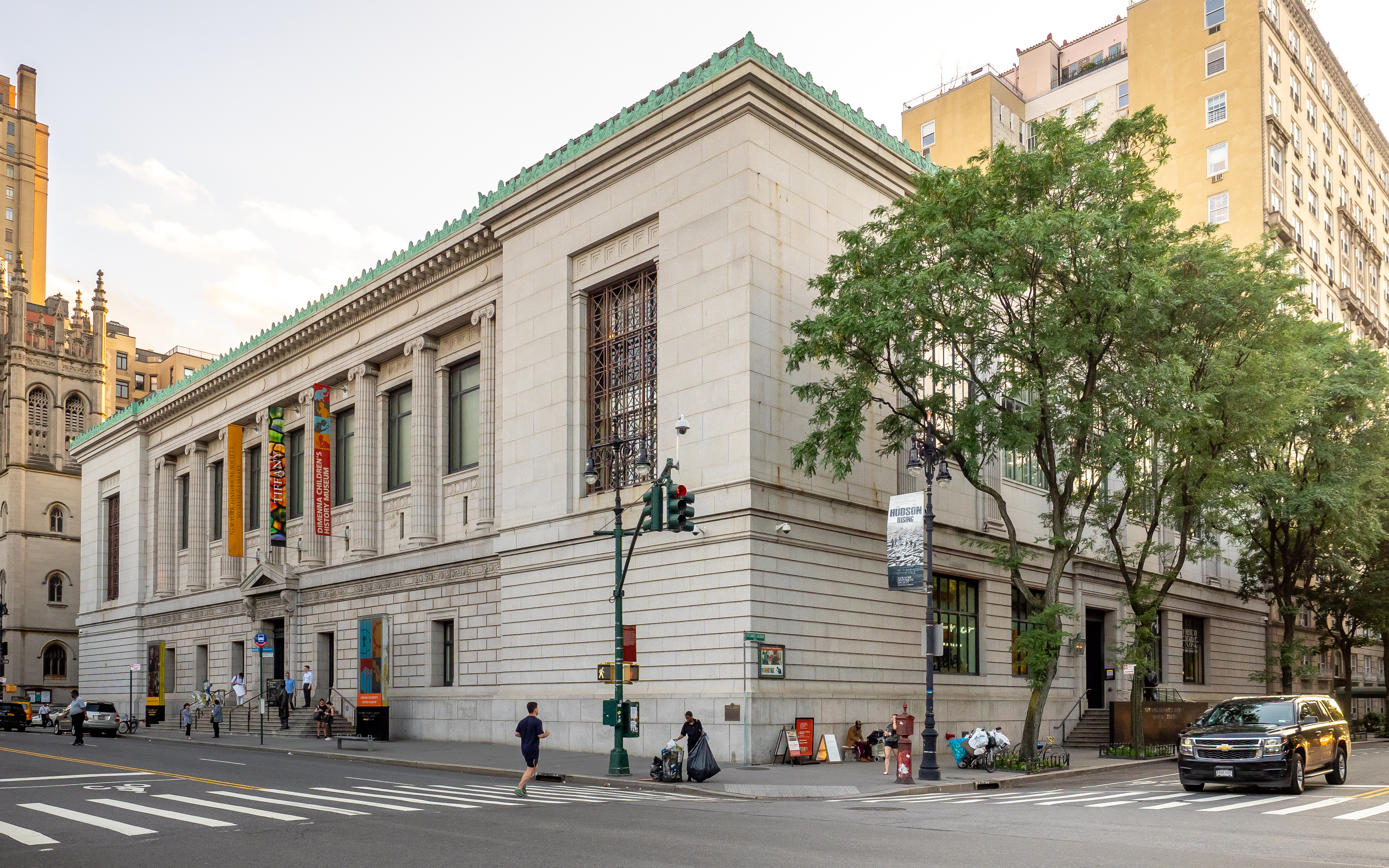
New-York Historical Society, New York City (1908)

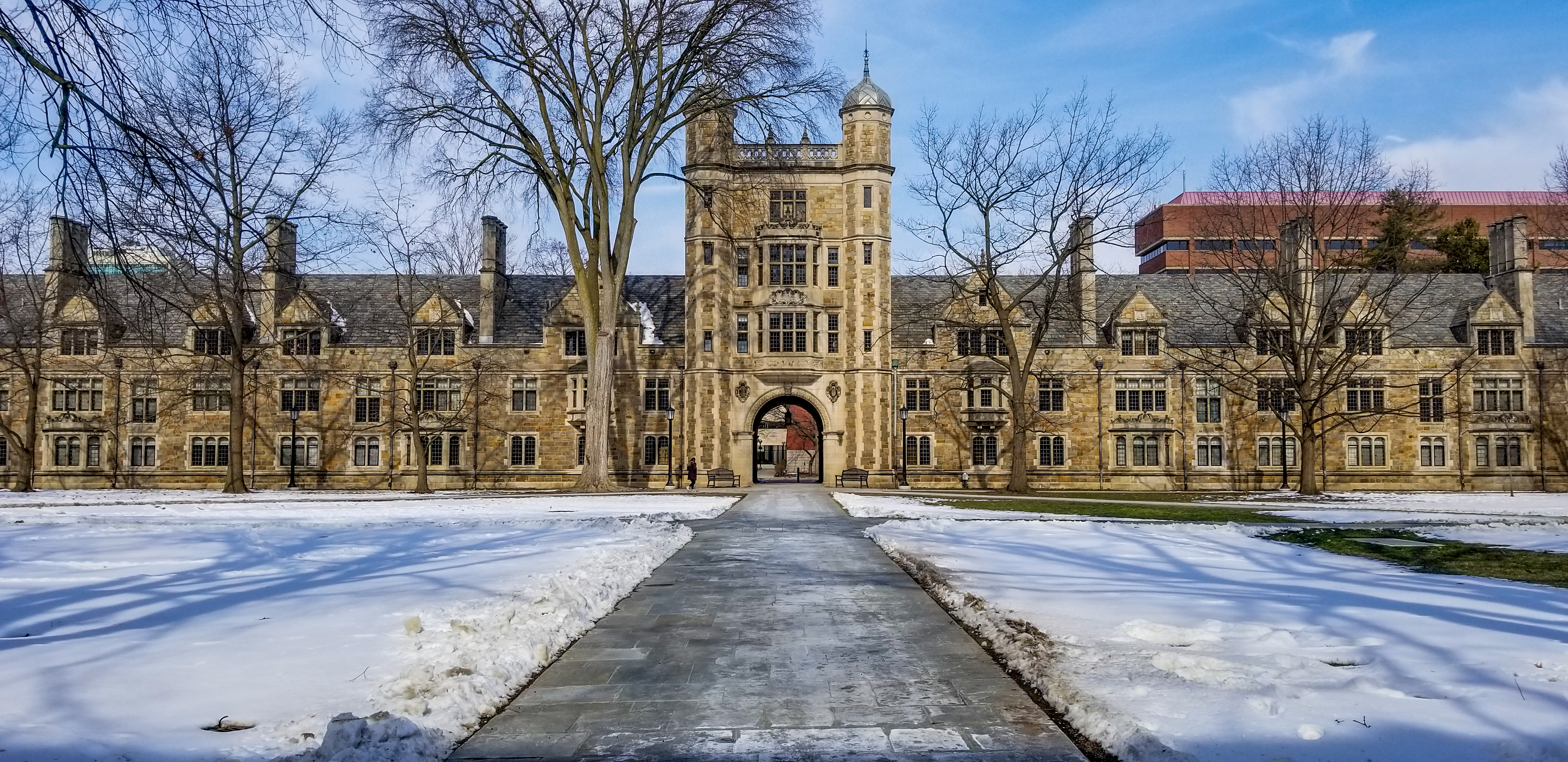
Law Quadrangle, University of Michigan (1924-1933)

Herbert C. Hoover Building, Washington, DC (1927-1932)

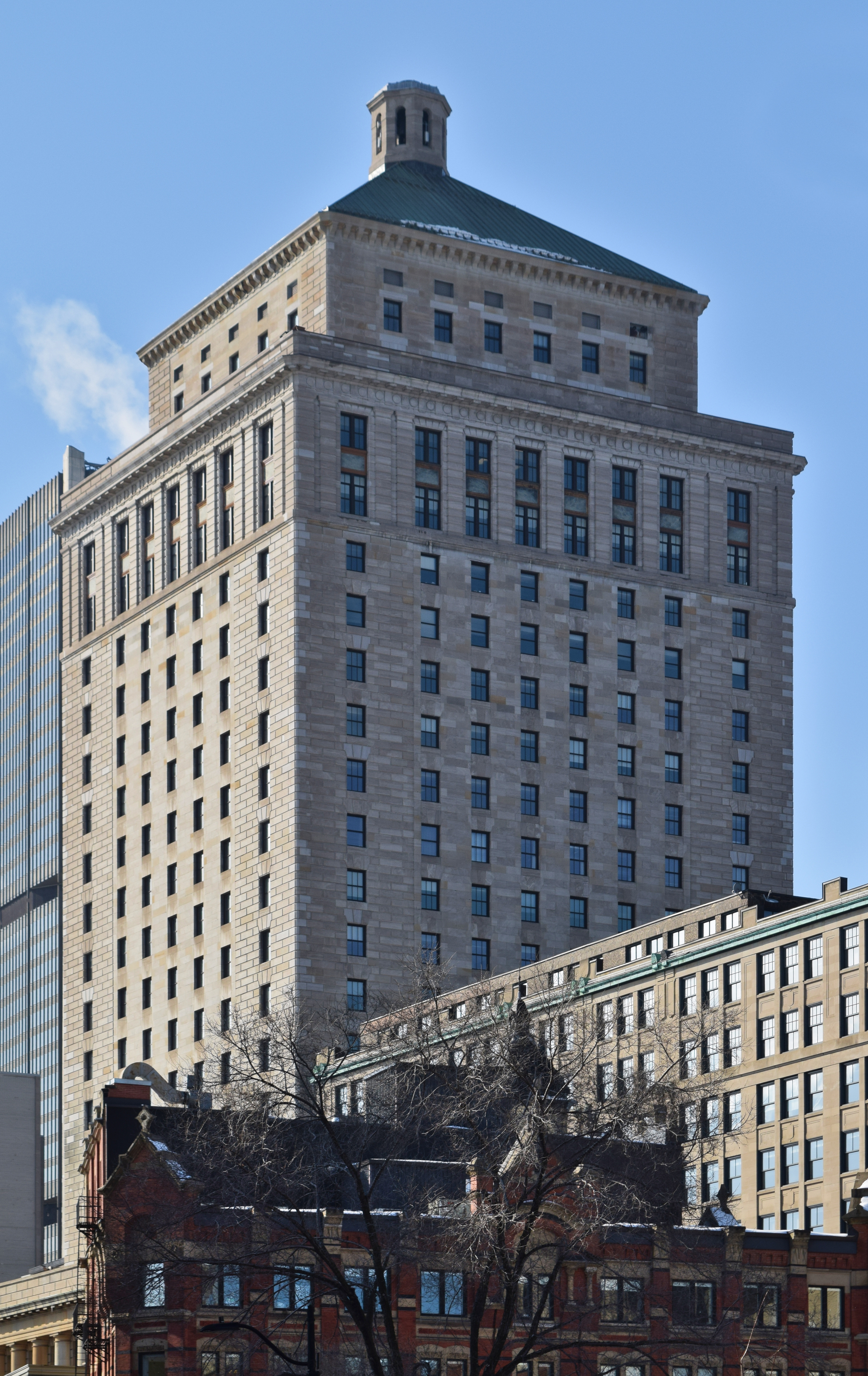
Old Royal Bank Building, Montreal (1926–1928)

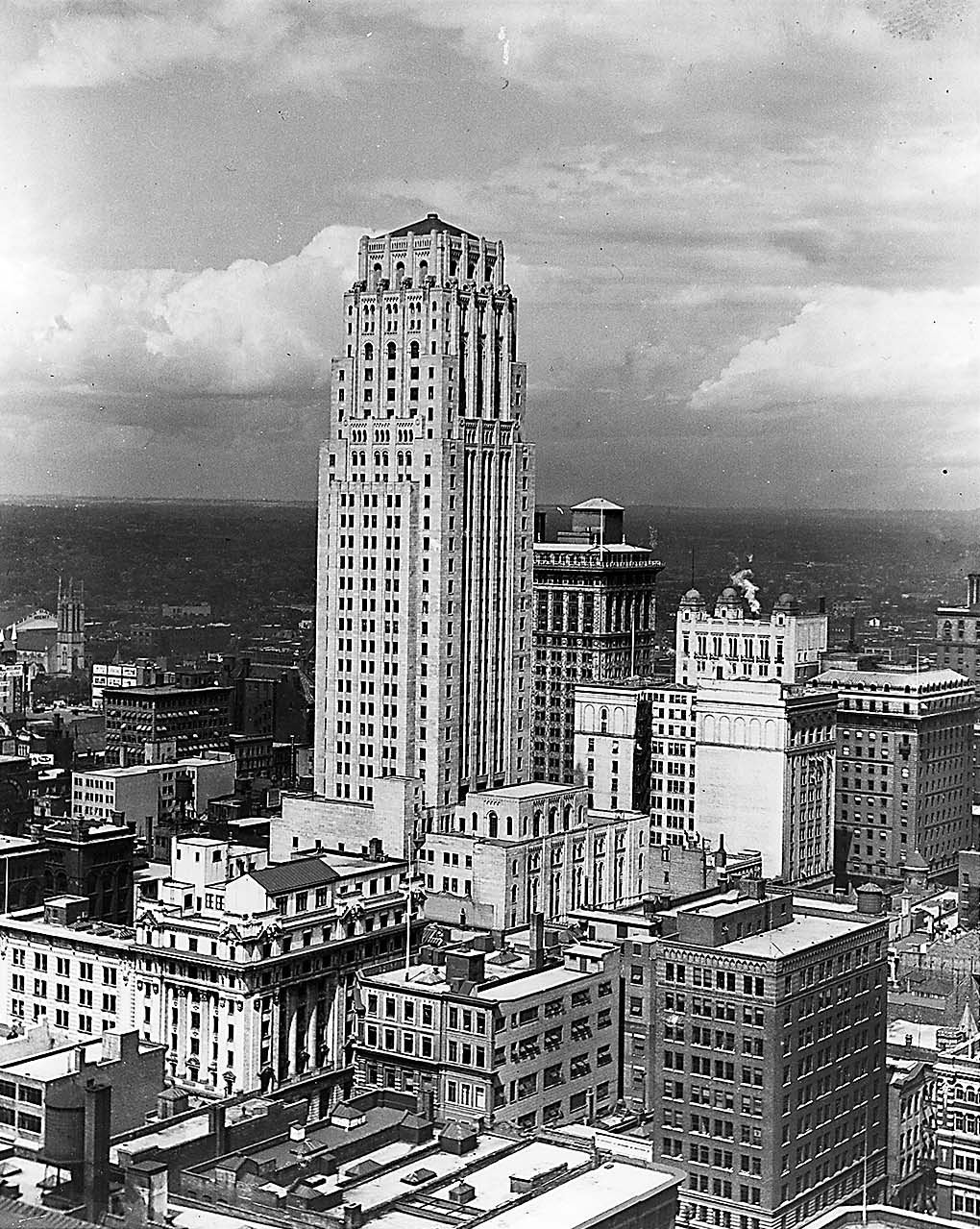
Commerce Court North (consulting, 1931)

== Associate architects and partners ==
- Louis Ayres (Partner)
- Frederick Staples Benedict
