= Transportation Building (Manhattan) =

Office skyscraper in Manhattan, New York

Coordinates: 40.7120°N 74.0086°W

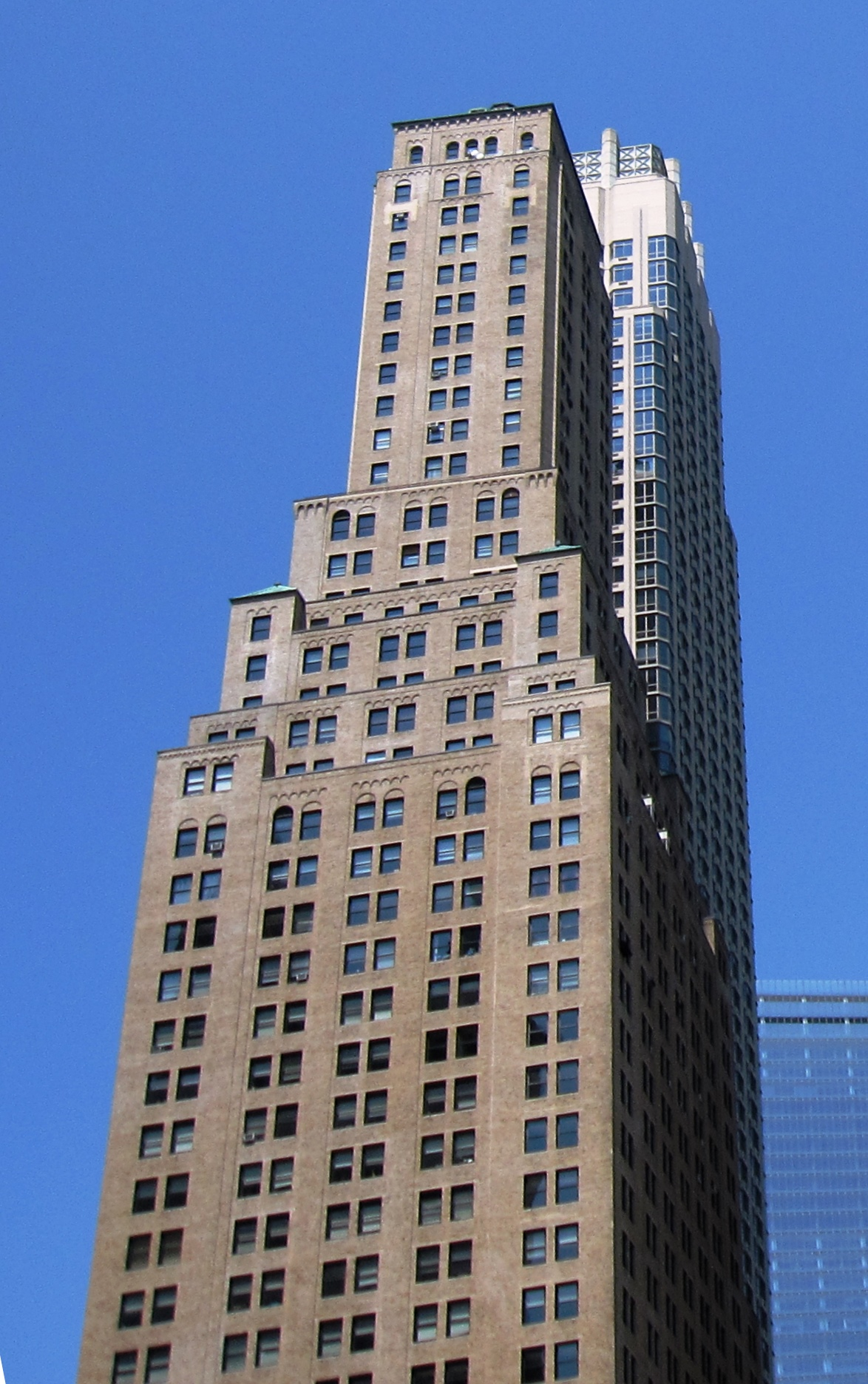
- (2010)

General information
- Architectural style: Renaissance Revival
- Address: 225 Broadway; Manhattan, New York City
- Completed: 1927
- Height: 545.01 feet (166.12 m)

Technical details
- Floor count: 44

Design and construction
- Architect(s): York & Sawyer

The Transportation Building is a 44-story skyscraper at 225 Broadway on the corner of Barclay Street in the Civic Center neighborhood of Lower Manhattan in New York City. It also carries the address 2-4 Barclay Street. It was built in 1927 and was designed by the architecture firm of York & Sawyer, in the Renaissance Revival style, using setbacks common to skyscrapers built after the adoption of the 1916 Zoning Resolution. It sits across Barclay Street from the Woolworth Building.

The site of the Transportation Building had previously been the northern portion of the Astor House luxury hotel. The hotel went into a long decline which began in the 1850s with the building of newer, more luxurious hotels. In 1913, the southern part was razed and replaced in 1915-16 with the Astor House Building at 217 Broadway, which is still extant. The northern part was torn down in 1926 to make way for the Transportation Building.

One of the first tenants of the Transportation Building was the Pace Institute – the predecessor of the school that is now Pace University – which moved into the new building in 1927 and remained until the 1950s.
