= Furio Piccirilli =

American artist

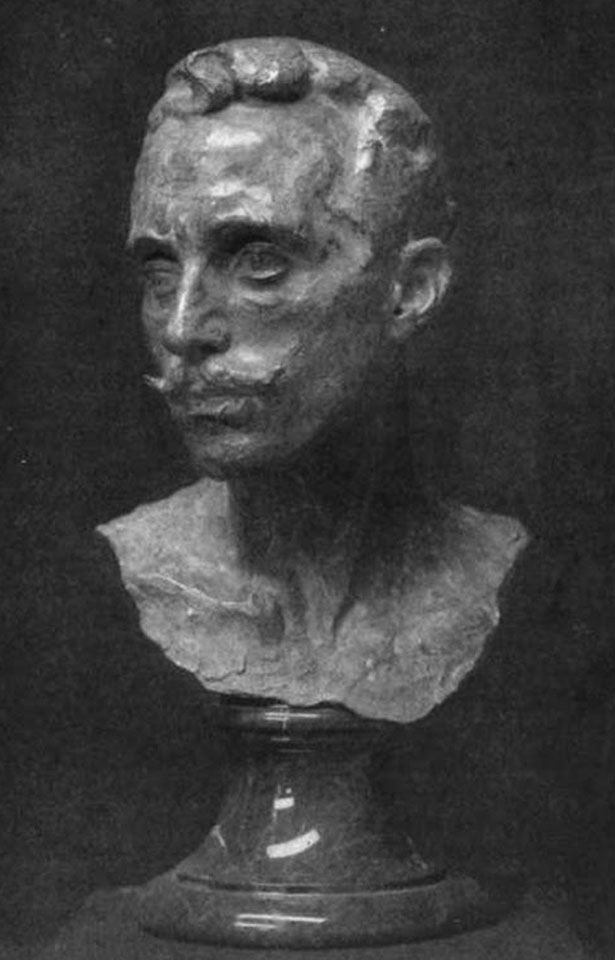
- Bust of Furio Piccirilli by Attilio Piccirilli
- Born: March 27, 1868; Massa, Italy
- Died: January 17, 1949 (aged 80); Rome
- Education: Accademia di San Luca
- Known for: sculpture
- Relatives: Piccirilli Brothers

Furio Piccirilli (March 27, 1868 – January 17, 1949) was an Italian-born American sculptor and one of the Piccirilli Brothers.

Piccirilli was born in Massa, Italy into a family with a long tradition of carving and sculpting. Like his older brother Attilio he was educated at the Accademia di San Luca of Rome. With his brother Attilio he immigrated to England in the mid-1880s and then moved to the United States in 1888 to Mott Haven, Bronx. With their father and brothers he helped establish the Piccirilli Brothers carving business.

He was a well known and respected sculptor aside from being known in connection with his family firm. He was "considered the most creative and the best modeler" of all the brothers.

Piccirilli Brothers carved the architectural sculpture for the Parliament Building in Winnipeg, Manitoba. Furio modeled the four larger-than-life seated figures that flank the side entrances.

Furio returned to Italy to get married in 1921, and then moved there permanently in 1926. He died in Rome in 1949.

== Selected works ==
- Five white marble portrait busts over Front Lobby doors, Daughters of the American Revolution Headquarters, Washington, D.C.
  - Bust of Ethan Allen (1911)
  - Bust of Isaac Shelby (1911)
  - Bust of John Adams (1911)
  - Bust of John Hancock (1911)
  - Bust of John Stark (1911)
- Eurydice (1911), marble. Exhibited at 1915 Panama-Pacific International Exposition (silver medal).
- Panama-Pacific International Exposition, San Francisco, 1915
  - Fountain of Spring
  - Fountain of Summer
  - Fountain of Autumn
  - Fountain of Winter
- Facade and West Gate (1915), California State Building, Balboa Park, San Diego, California
- Portia (niche figure) (1915), Martha Cook Building, University of Michigan, Ann Arbor
- Seated figures flanking side entrances, Parliament Building, Winnipeg, Manitoba
  - Lord Selkirk
  - Marquis of Dufferin
  - General Wolfe
  - Sieur de La Vérendrye (1920)
- Seal (1927), Metropolitan Museum of Art, Manhattan, New York City. Another carving is located at Brookgreen Gardens, Murrells Inlet, South Carolina.
- Penguin (c.1936), National Academy of Design, Manhattan, New York City
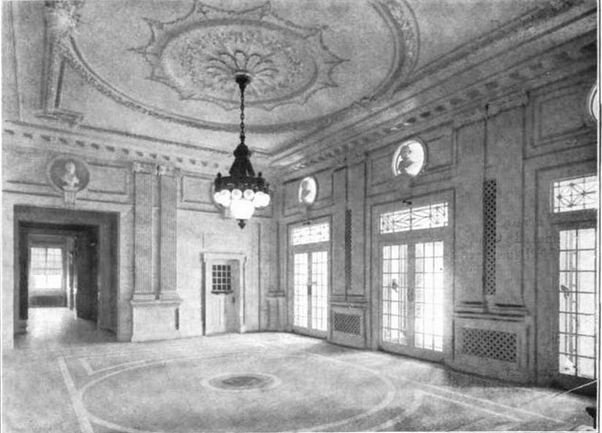
Front Lobby (1911), DAR Headquarters, Washington, D.C.

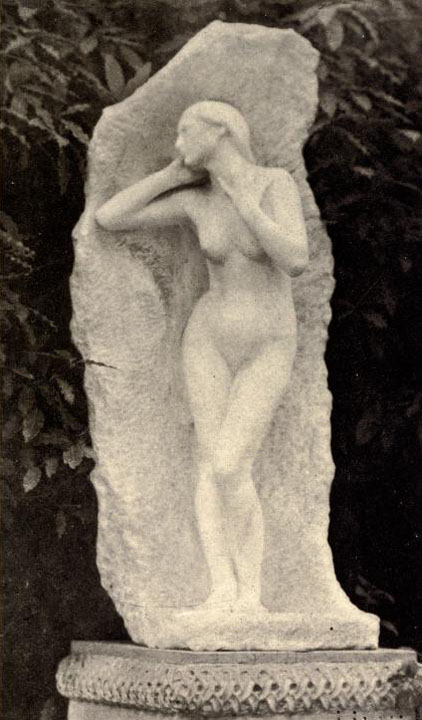
Eurydice (1911)

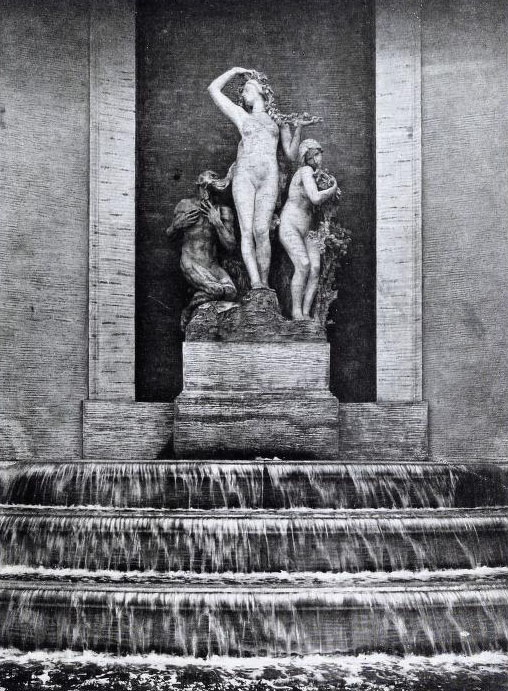
Fountain of Spring (1915), Panama-Pacific International Exposition

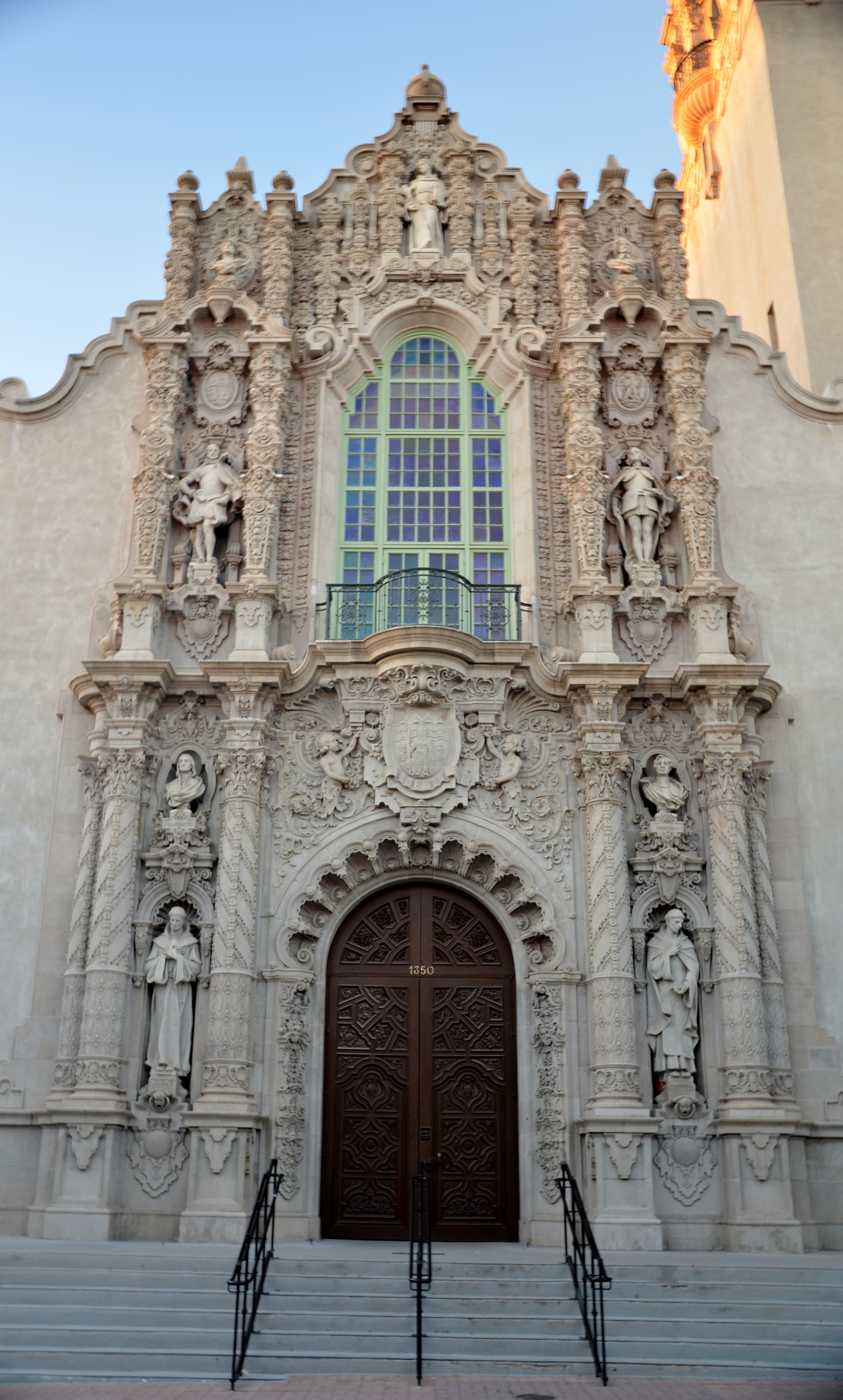
California State Building façade (1915), Balbo Park, San Diego, California

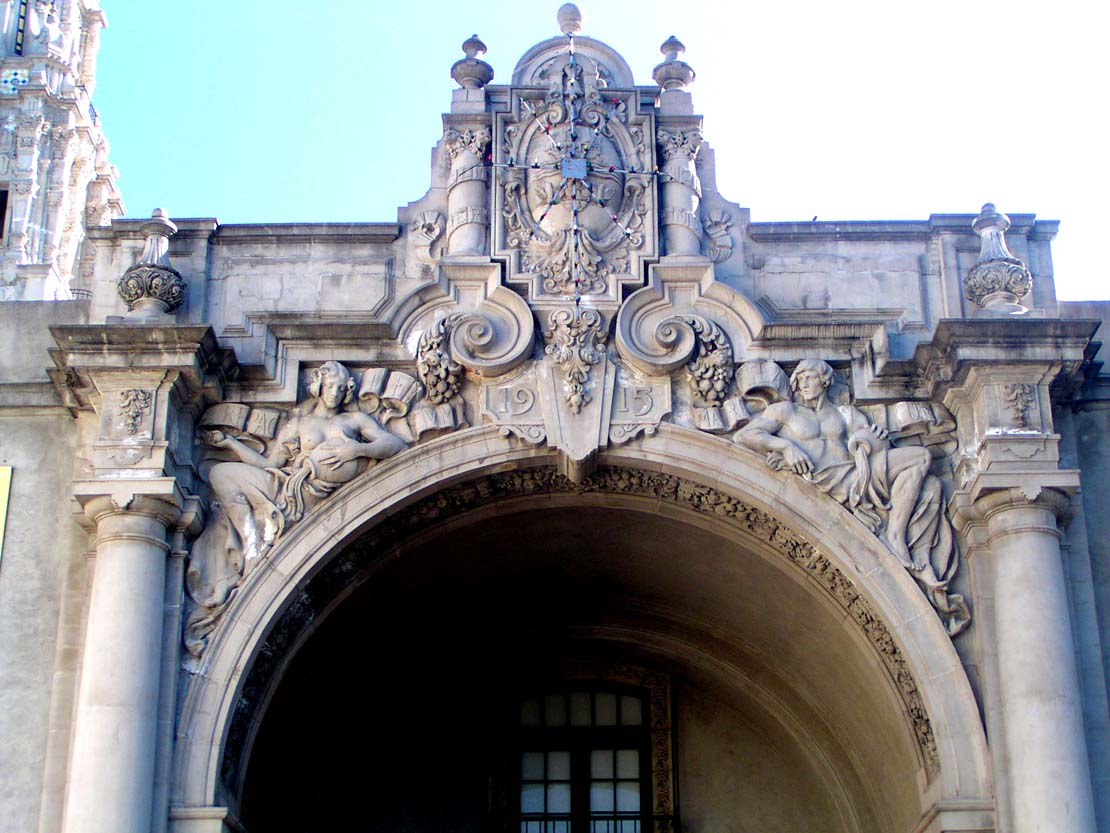
West Gate, California State Building. The spandrel figures represented the Atlantic and Pacific Oceans.

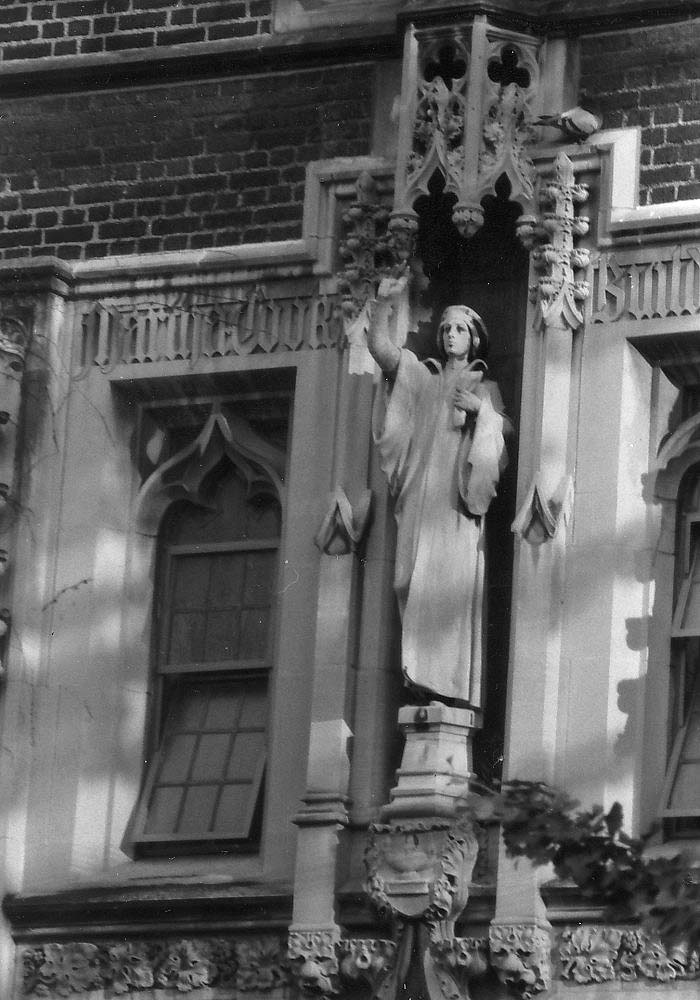
Portia (1915), Martha Cook Building, University of Michigan

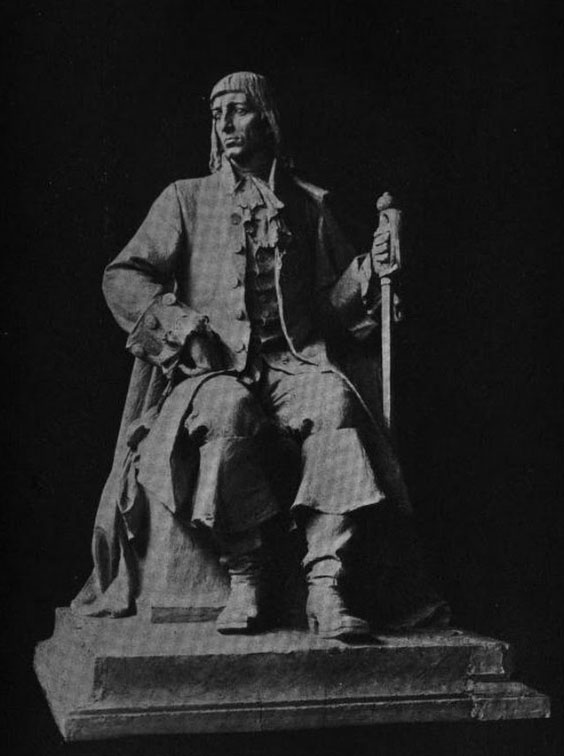
Sieur de La Vérendrye (1920), Manitoba Government Building, Winnipeg

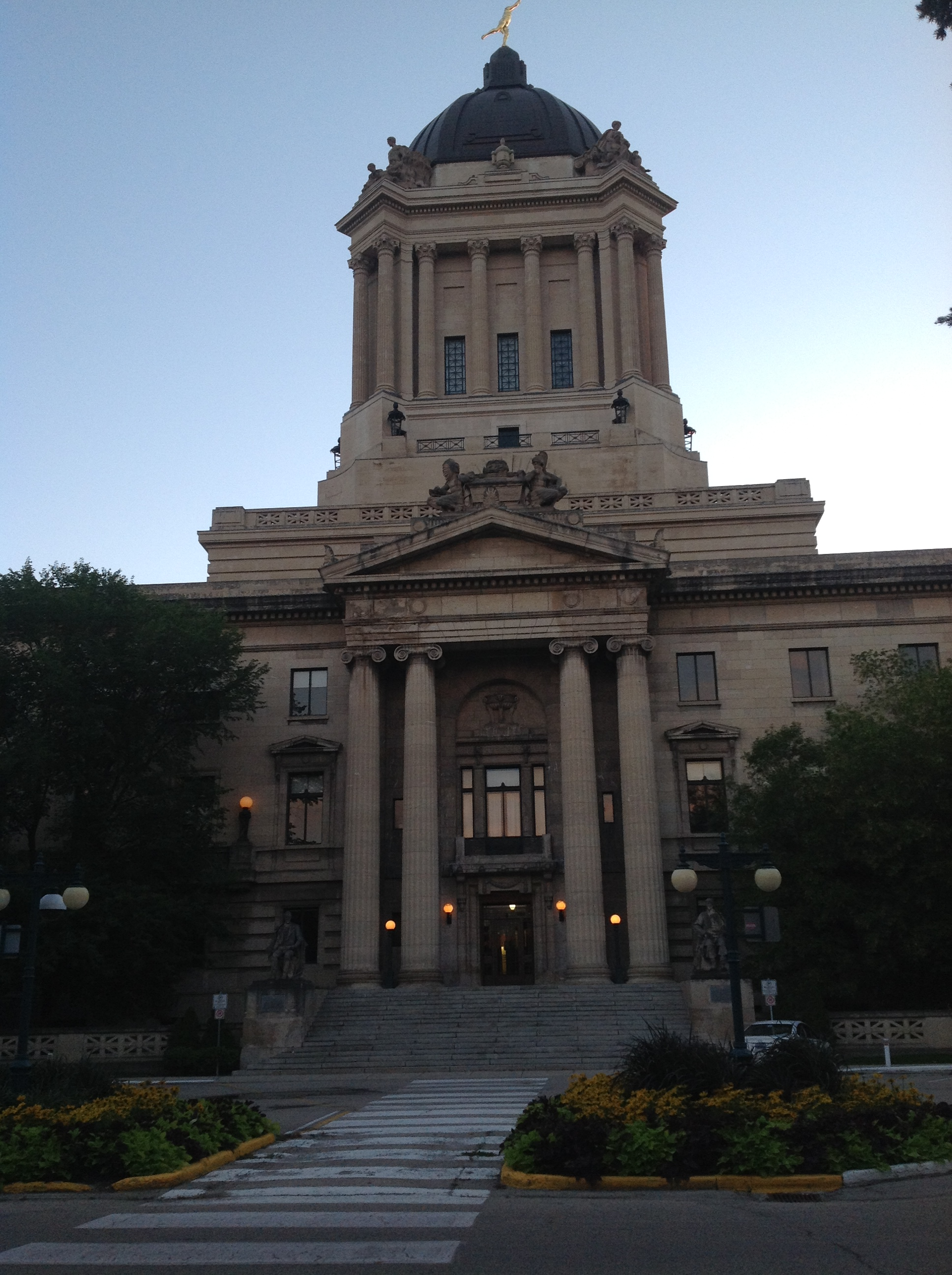
Side entrance, Manitoba Government Building, Winnipeg

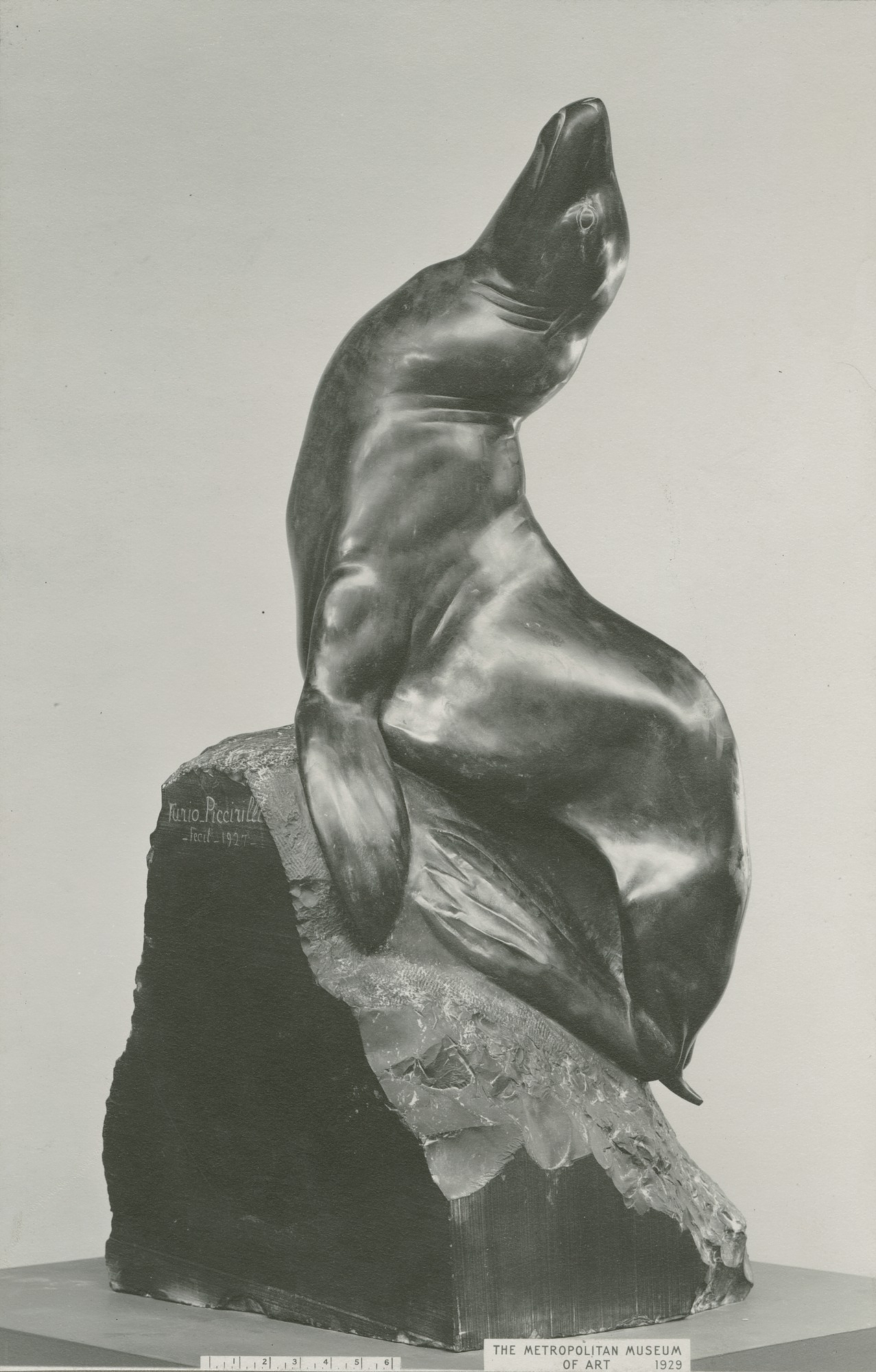
Seal (1927), Metropolitan Museum of Art

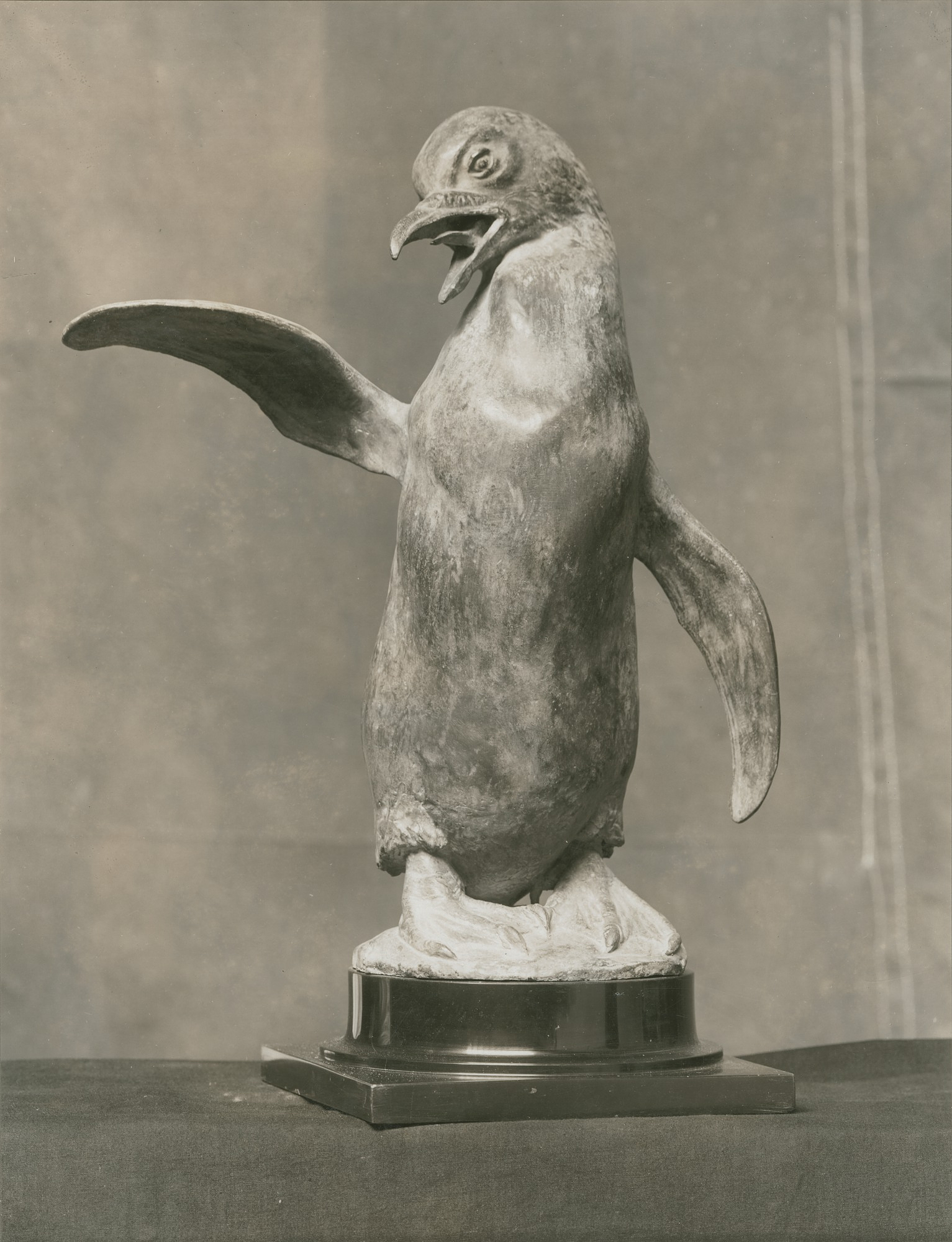
Penguin (c.1936), National Academy of Design
