= International Building (Toronto) =

Coordinates: 43.633°N 79.416°W

The International Building, originally the Transportation Building, was an exhibition hall at Exhibition Place, Toronto, Ontario, Canada. In 1923, The Globe newspaper described it as "one of the most effective and beautiful display situations in the whole of the Exhibition buildings" after its opening. The building burnt down on August 23, 1974.

== Exhibitions ==
- 1923: Northern Ontario was featured, per "official sanction and personal interest" of Ontario Premier Howard Ferguson. More than 18,000 sq ft of the building was dedicated to the theme. The exhibit was the result of "steady agitation on the part of the Northern Boards of Trade", as the previous exhibits centred around Scadding Cabin were deemed to give a negative impression.

Ironically, the "International Building Exhibition" was held at the Automotive Building (now known as the Beanfield Centre)
