= Daniel Lupi =

English film producer

- Born: London, England
- Occupation: Film producer
- Spouse: JoAnne Sellar

Daniel Lupi is an English film producer. He collaborated with Paul Thomas Anderson on many of his films.

== Filmography ==
=== Film ===
Year	Film	Credit	Ref.
1992	Dust Devil	Associate producer	
1993	Dark Blood	Co-producer	
1996	Hard Eight	Co-producer	
1997	Nightwatch	Line producer	
1997	Boogie Nights	Co-producer	
1997	Scream 2	Co-producer	
1999	Magnolia	Co-producer	
2001	Impostor		
2002	Punch-Drunk Love		
2002	Simone	Co-producer	
2002	Catch Me If You Can	Co-executive producer	
2004	50 First Dates	Executive producer	
2005	Kicking & Screaming	Executive producer	
2005	Get Rich or Die Tryin'	Executive producer	
2007	There Will Be Blood		
2007	Lions for Lambs	Executive producer	
2009	Land of the Lost	Executive producer	
2010	Little Fockers	Executive producer	
2012	The Master		
2012	Lincoln	Executive producer	
2013	Her	Executive producer	
2014	Inherent Vice		
2015	Bridge of Spies	Executive producer	
2017	Phantom Thread		
2018	Ready Player One	Executive producer	
2019	Us	Executive producer	
2021	Licorice Pizza	Executive producer	
2021	West Side Story	Executive producer	
2023	Killers of the Flower Moon		
2025	F1	Executive producer	
TBA	What Happens at Night		

Production manager

Year	Film	Role
1986	Hotshot	Assistant unit manager
1987	Firehouse	Production manager
1989	Signs of Life	Unit manager
1992	Dust Devil	Production manager
1997	Boogie Nights	Unit production manager
1997	Scream 2	Unit production manager
1999	Magnolia	Unit production manager
2000	Scream 3	Production manager
2001	Impostor	Unit production manager
2002	Punch-Drunk Love	Unit production manager
2002	Simone	Unit production manager
2004	50 First Dates	Unit production manager
2005	Kicking & Screaming	Unit production manager
2007	There Will Be Blood	Unit production manager
2007	Lions for Lambs	Unit production manager
2009	Land of the Lost	Unit production manager
2010	Little Fockers	Production manager
2012	The Master	Unit production manager
2013	Her	Unit production manager
2015	Bridge of Spies	Unit production manager
2018	Ready Player One	Unit production manager
2019	Us	Unit production manager
2021	West Side Story	Unit production manager
2023	Killers of the Flower Moon	Unit production manager
2025	F1	Unit production manager

Miscellaneous crew

Year	Film	Role
1985	The Stuff	Production assistant
1988	Rocket Gibraltar	Unit coordinator
1990	The Local Stigmatic	Production assistant

Second unit director or assistant director

Year	Film	Role
1987	Firehouse	First assistant director

Thanks

Year	Film	Role
1995	Pie in the Sky	Thanks
2001	The Anniversary Party	Very special thanks

=== Television ===
Production manager

Year	Title	Role	Notes
1986	Pee-wee's Playhouse	Unit manager	
1986	Tales from the Darkside	Unit manager	
1988	Lemon Sky	Production manager	Television film
1989	Big Time	Production manager	Television film
1990	Beyond the Groove	Production manager	
1992	Lifestories: Families in Crisis	Production manager	
