= Color Out of Space (film) =

2019 science fiction horror film directed by Richard Stanley

- Theatrical release poster
- Directed by: Richard Stanley
- Written by: Richard Stanley; Scarlett Amaris
- Based on: "The Colour Out of Space" by H. P. Lovecraft
- Produced by: Daniel Noah; Josh C. Waller; Elijah Wood; Lisa Whalen
- Starring: Nicolas Cage; Joely Richardson; Elliot Knight; Madeleine Arthur; Q'orianka Kilcher; Tommy Chong
- Cinematography: Steve Annis
- Edited by: Brett W. Bachman
- Music by: Colin Stetson
- Production company: SpectreVision
- Distributed by: RLJE Films
- Release dates: September 7, 2019 (TIFF); January 24, 2020 (United States)
- Running time: 111 minutes
- Country: United States
- Language: English
- Budget: $6–12 million
- Box office: $1 million

Color Out of Space is a 2019 American science fiction Lovecraftian horror film directed and co-written by Richard Stanley and Scarlett Amaris based on the short story "The Colour Out of Space" by H. P. Lovecraft. It stars Nicolas Cage, Joely Richardson, Elliot Knight, Madeleine Arthur, Brendan Meyer, Q'orianka Kilcher and Tommy Chong. This is Stanley's first feature film since his firing from The Island of Dr. Moreau (1996). According to Stanley, it is the first film in a trilogy of Lovecraft adaptations, which he hopes to continue with an adaptation of "The Dunwich Horror".

== Plot ==
In the wake of his wife Theresa's mastectomy, Nathan Gardner moves his family, including children Lavinia, Benny, and Jack, to his late father's farm. One night, a brilliantly colored meteorite crash-lands in their front yard near the well. The next morning, hydrologist Ward Phillips, who is surveying the area for a dam development, along with the mayor and the sheriff of the nearby town of Arkham, arrive to see the meteor. Nathan and Lavinia later witness strange phenomena around the meteor, until it suddenly disappears.

Ward notices that the groundwater has taken on an oily sheen and tests it. When his test strips begin to glow brightly with the color of the meteor, he advises the Gardners not to drink it. The family quickly becomes contaminated: Jack becomes fixated on the property's well, observing strange plant growths and insects, as well as claiming to communicate with a 'friend' inside the well. When Theresa is preparing dinner, she vacantly cuts off two of her fingers. Nathan rushes her to the hospital and Benny goes outside to put the farm's alpacas back in their stables, but does not return until late at night, claiming time had passed instantaneously for him. Meanwhile, Lavinia repeatedly tries to contact Nathan, but they are unable to hear each other through the phone. Upon the parents' return, Nathan lashes out at Benny and Lavinia with uncharacteristic rage. Further stresses, including all the crops becoming desiccated, place the family in crisis.

Later, Lavinia tries to perform a ritual using a copy of the Necronomicon and offering her blood to save her family, mutilating herself in the process. Theresa suddenly hears Jack and Benny screaming after entering the alpaca stables and rushes to their aid, as the "Color" begins appearing outside. A bolt of the Color strikes and fuses Theresa and Jack together into a hideous mass. Finding all their electronic devices dead, the family is stranded and Nathan and the children carry Jack and Theresa into the attic to shield them from sunlight, which harms them. Benny reveals that the alpacas were similarly mutated and fused together by the Color and Nathan euthanizes them with a shotgun. Beginning to lose his sanity, Nathan also attempts to euthanize Theresa and Jack, but is unable to bring himself to do it.

Lavinia and Benny attempt to leave the farm on horseback, but the horse flees. Benny then insists that he hears the family's dog inside the well, but upon climbing in, he is assimilated by the Color. Nathan, now fully deranged from the Color, locks Lavinia in the attic with Theresa and Jack, who have turned monstrous, attacking her. Ward and the sheriff return to the farm after a nearby resident discovers a fused mass of animals, and arrive just in time to break into the attic to save Lavinia. Nathan shoots and kills the monster, no longer viewing them as his family.

Ward rushes Lavinia outside as the Color emerges from the well, and Nathan attempts to shoot it. The sheriff mistakenly believes Nathan is aiming at Ward, and shoots him. Lavinia insists on staying with the dying Nathan, so Ward and the sheriff leave to rescue the neighbor Ezra. At Ezra's cabin, the pair find Ezra's desiccated corpse and Ezra's voice coming from an audio recorder, postulating that the Color is draining the life out of everything around it and attempting to xenoform its environment. Ward and the sheriff flee a burst of the Color, but a mutated tree catches and kills the sheriff outside the cabin.

Ward returns to rescue Lavinia, but finds her fully possessed by the Color, which explodes out of the well and forms a funnel into the sky. Ward is shown a vision of where the Color hails from, a psychedelic exoplanet inhabited by tentacled alien entities, before Lavinia disintegrates, becoming part of the funnel. As space and time begin to unravel, Ward enters the farmhouse and is pursued by a murderous apparition of Nathan. He hides in the wine cellar as the Color's distortion of reality destroys the property, leaving Ward the only survivor as he climbs out of the remains of the farmland, now a colorless ashy "blasted heath".

In an epilogue, an older Ward stands on top of the finished dam as a reservoir covers the former property. He says that few people remember the incident, but having witnessed the Color's effects, he will never drink the water. He concludes that the Color was a messenger from realms beyond human understanding. As he leaves, an insect mutated by the Color flies by.

== Cast ==
- Nicolas Cage as Nathan Gardner, farmer, father of the Gardner family.
- Joely Richardson as Theresa Gardner, businesswoman and mother of the Gardner family.
- Madeleine Arthur as Lavinia Gardner, the teenage daughter and Wiccan.
- Brendan Meyer as Benny Gardner, the teenage son.
- Julian Hilliard as Jack Gardner, the youngest son.
- Elliot Knight as Ward Phillips, a hydrologist and surveyor for a Dam development company.
- Tommy Chong as Ezra, a hippie "squatter" who lives on the Gardners' land.
- Josh C. Waller as Sheriff Pierce, chief of police to the nearby town of Arkham.
- Q'orianka Kilcher as Mayor Tooma, the mayor of the nearby town of Arkham.

== Production ==
Richard Stanley's mother, Penny Miller, was a fan of H. P. Lovecraft. She read Lovecraft's works to Stanley when he was young. At the age of 12 or 13, he read "The Colour Out of Space", which has "always been a part of [his] psychological makeup". When his mother suffered from cancer, Stanley read Lovecraft's works to her in her declining years.

Stanley initially announced the project in 2013, showcasing a proof of concept trailer online. In September 2015, it was announced that Spectrevision would be producing the film with a projected start date of early 2016.

After many delays, it was announced in December 2018 that Nicolas Cage had signed to play the lead role and that filming would begin in early 2019 with co-producers SpectreVision and ACE Pictures. In January 2019, the production announced additional cast members including stars Joely Richardson, Tommy Chong, Elliot Knight, Julian Hilliard and Q'Orianka Kilcher. Filming took place in the Sintra-Cascais Natural Park, Portugal in February 2019.

== Soundtrack ==
The soundtrack was composed by Colin Stetson. Waxwork Records released the sound track on a single LP in 2020 in collaboration with Milan Records.

== Release ==
Color Out of Space premiered on September 7, 2019, in the Midnight Madness portion of the 2019 Toronto International Film Festival. On September 6, 2019, it was announced that RLJE Films acquired U.S. rights in a low-mid seven figure deal. "Color Out of Space" was financed by Ace Pictures and XYZ Films handled international sales on the film.

Following select preview screenings on January 22, the film was released in 81 theaters in the United States on January 24, 2020. With previews and the first weekend box office, the film grossed $358,154 over the four days.

== Reception ==
=== Critical response ===
On review aggregator Rotten Tomatoes, Color Out of Space holds an approval rating of 86% based on 210 reviews, and an average rating of 6.80/10. The site's critics consensus reads: "A welcome return for director Richard Stanley, Color Out of Space mixes tart B-movie pulp with visually alluring Lovecraftian horror and a dash of gonzo Nicolas Cage." On Metacritic, the film has a weighted average score of 70 out of 100, based on 28 critics, indicating "generally favorable" reviews.

Chris Bumbray from Arrow in the Head rated the film a score of 7/10, praising the film's performances, visual style and effects while noting the film's length. Bumbray summarized his review by writing, "While it's maybe a touch slow and arty for hardcore horror fans, Color Out of Space is still a handy comeback for Richard Stanley, who hasn't lost a beat." Mary Beth McAndrews from Daily Grindhouse gave the film a positive review, writing, "[Richard Stanley's] film successfully captures the madness of Lovecraft's work and is a dazzling modern interpretation. [...] Lovecraft is notoriously hard to adapt, but Stanley walks the fine line between horror and existential dread to create a successful adaptation".

Deborah Young from The Hollywood Reporter offered the film similar praise, writing, "Hitting the main plot points with well-designed SFX and some impressive night photography, Stanley's film manages to be frightening indeed, even with star Nicolas Cage's semi-farcical leavening adding some nutty laughs." Jonathan Barkan of Dread Central awarded the film three and a half out of five stars, praising the film's visual style, special effects, and soundtrack, while criticizing the film's first and third act. Nevertheless, Barkan summarized his review by stating, "Gorgeous, vibrant, and terrifying, Color Out of Space is packed with Lovecraftian creatures and cosmic infections galore. It's not perfect but goddamn is it a wild ride."

Dennis Harvey from Variety gave the film a mostly positive review, noting the film's uneven tone and Cage's "arbitrarily oddball" performance, while praising the film's otherworldly imagery, cinematography, and direction. The Skinny's Katie Goh gave the film a rating of three out of five stars, stating that: "Colour Out of Space is at its best when Stanley goes for this subtle and intelligent filmmaking, gesturing at the horror rather than pushing it in our faces".

Howard Gorman from NME praised Stanley's welcome return, underlining the core "intense, unpredictable and harrowing moral tale," and Cage putting in his "most nuanced" turn in the last decade.

=== Accolades ===
Award	Date	Category	Recipient(s)	Result	Ref.
Toronto Film Festival	September 7, 2019	Creative Coalition's Spotlight Initiative Award	Nicolas Cage	Won	
Fantastic Fest	September 24, 2019	Best Horror Film	Richard Stanley	Won	
H. P. Lovecraft Film Festival	October 6, 2019	Best Feature, Audience Choice	Richard Stanley	Won	
Bram Stoker Award	May 2021	Superior Achievement in a Screenplay	Scarlett Amaris; Richard Stanley	Nominated	

== See also ==
- List of films featuring extraterrestrials
