= Firehouse (disambiguation) =

A firehouse is a structure for storing firefighting apparatus.

Firehouse may also refer to:

== Film ==
- Firehouse, a 1973 film starring Richard Roundtree
- Firehouse (1987 film), a 1987 film featuring film debut of Julia Roberts
- Firehouse (1997 film), a 1997 film starring Richard Dean Anderson

== Music ==
- FireHouse, an American glam metal band formed in 1989
  - FireHouse (album), a 1990 album by the band
- "Firehouse", a song by Kiss from the 1974 album Kiss

== Television ==
- Firehouse (TV series), a 1974 American television series

== See also ==
- List of firehouses
- Firehouse primary
- Firehouse Five Plus Two, a Dixieland jazz band popular in the 1950s
- Firehouse Subs, an American fast food restaurant chain
- Dalmatian (dog), also known as a firehouse dog
