= JoAnne Sellar =

English-American film producer

- Born: February 1963 (age 63); Hendon, Middlesex, England
- Occupation: Film producer
- Spouse: Daniel Lupi

JoAnne Ruth Sellar (born February 1963) is an English film producer.

== Career ==
Sellar has collaborated with Paul Thomas Anderson on eight of his ten films.

== Filmography ==
She was producer for all films unless otherwise noted.

=== Film ===
Year	Title	Director	Credit	Ref.
1990	Hardware	Richard Stanley		
1992	Dust Devil	Richard Stanley		
1993	Dark Blood	George Sluizer		
1995	Lord of Illusions	Clive Barker		
1997	Boogie Nights	Paul Thomas Anderson		
1999	Magnolia	Paul Thomas Anderson		
2002	Punch-Drunk Love	Paul Thomas Anderson		
2006	The Wicker Man	Neil LaBute	Executive producer	
2007	There Will Be Blood	Paul Thomas Anderson		
2012	The Master	Paul Thomas Anderson		
2014	Inherent Vice	Paul Thomas Anderson		
2017	Phantom Thread	Paul Thomas Anderson		
2021	Licorice Pizza	Paul Thomas Anderson	Executive producer	
2025	Tuner	Daniel Roher		

Thanks

Year	Title	Role
1988	High Spirits	The producers wish to thank
2010	Beginners	Mike Mills wishes to thank
2016	The Bad Batch	Special thanks
2016	20th Century Women	Special thanks
2018	The Sisters Brothers	The producers would like to thank

=== Television ===
Year	Title	Credit	Notes
1990	Beyond the Groove	Associate producer	
1990	Red Hot and Blue	Co-producer	Television special

Miscellaneous crew

Year	Title	Role
1984	Mistral's Daughter	Assistant to director
