= Dark Blood =

2012 film by George Sluizer

- Theatrical release poster
- Directed by: George Sluizer
- Written by: Jim Barton
- Produced by: Daniel Lupi; Jeannie Neill; Nik Powell; JoAnne Sellar; Stephen Woolley
- Starring: River Phoenix; Judy Davis; Jonathan Pryce
- Cinematography: Edward Lachman
- Edited by: Martin Walsh; Michiel Reichwein
- Music by: Florencia di Concilio; James Michael Taylor
- Production companies: Scala Productions (1993); Sluizer Films (2012)
- Release dates: September 27, 2012 (private audience, NFF)
- Running time: 86 minutes
- Countries: United States; Netherlands
- Language: English

Dark Blood is a 2012 thriller film directed by George Sluizer, written by Jim Barton, and starring River Phoenix, Judy Davis, and Jonathan Pryce. Production on the film was halted due to the death of Phoenix in 1993, shortly before the end of the project (it would also be the final film made by Sluizer) and remained unfinished for 19 years. It was the last film to feature River Phoenix and the only film in which Phoenix portrayed a villain.

The film follows Boy (Phoenix), a young widower, who retreats to the desert after his wife dies of radiation following nuclear tests near their home. Boy is waiting for the end of the world and carves Kachina dolls, believing they contain magical powers. A couple, Harry (Pryce) and Buffy (Davis) travel to the desert on a second honeymoon in an attempt to save their marriage. Their car breaks down in the middle of nowhere and the couple is rescued by Boy. Boy holds them prisoner because of his desire for Buffy and his ambition to create a better world with her.

It premiered to a private guest audience on September 27, 2012, at the Netherlands Film Festival in Utrecht, Netherlands. The film was shown twice more, publicly, on October 2, 2012, at the festival. It was shown at the 63rd Berlin International Film Festival in February 2013, the Miami International Film Festival in March 2013, the Split Film Festival in September 2013, and the Brussels International Fantastic Film Festival in April 2014. On January 26, 2018, Dark Blood was released on DVD in Germany.

== Plot ==
The movie begins with Harry, an actor who hasn't worked in over a year, and his wife Buffy, an ex-showgirl, traveling by car on their "second honeymoon". After staying overnight at a motel, the owner informs Harry of previous nuclear testing taking place in the town. The following day, their Bentley eventually breaks down, leading them to run out of water in the middle of the desert. Harry insists on staying with the car rather than to look for help. While Harry sleeps in the back seat, Buffy notices a light in the distance and follows it, leading her to the front door of a cabin belonging to a widower named Boy. He drives with her to rescue Harry. After mentioning he is one-eighth Hopi Native American, Boy reveals a cave filled with candles and voodoo dolls that he believes have magical powers, which he spends his time making while waiting for the world to end.

During their stay, Boy promises to drive them to the nearest town, but keeps delaying this offer by dismantling the entire engine of his truck after telling the couple there's a problem with it, and later telling them he is waiting for friends to arrive before he can take them to town. His friends, meanwhile have been told by Boy where to find their Bentley and they tow it away. Buffy and Boy become attracted to each other, angering Harry. Harry tells Boy to leave her alone while on a shooting hunt. The two have an argument and Boy retreats, leaving Harry to find his way back from the desert. Boy later fires a shot at Harry, but tells him he was shooting a snake in a passive-aggressive gesture. Eventually, the couple become aware that Boy will not let them leave. Exasperated, Harry announces he is walking to the town and marches off alone. After an argument with Buffy, Boy drives off frustrated, finds Harry dehydrated, gives him water and brings him back to the cabin where Boy locks Harry in a barn, telling Buffy he's gone mad from the heat.

Later on, as they are all sleeping, Harry wakes silently, rouses Buffy and steals the keys to Boy's truck in an escape attempt that is quickly thwarted by Boy who catches them as they are leaving his cabin. A fight ensues and after hitting him with a crowbar, Harry is judged by means of a kangaroo court, and ordered to chop wood as punishment. As he is cutting the wood, he sees Buffy removing her clothes and is forced to overhear as his wife is raped, turning his back, unable to watch. Buffy later comes outside to tell Harry that Boy is finally taking them to the town. Boy's friends approach, bringing the repaired Bentley, and Boy announces only Harry can leave in his car. Outraged, Harry attacks Boy with the axe, only for Boy to block the axe's blow with his rifle above his head. However, unable to withstand Harry's strength, the axe hits Boy, splitting open his head and knocking him to the ground. Acting in self-defence, Harry is forced to fatally wound Boy's dog when it tries to attack him. Boy gets to his feet, telling Harry that he has never wanted to kill a man before, his finger on the trigger of the rifle. Harry begs for his life, but Boy then collapses from the bleeding head wound.

At that moment the couple's car is delivered by Boy's native friends, who take Boy inside the cabin, where he requests to see Buffy. As his last physical effort, he lifts himself to embrace her, dying in her arms as Harry is held at gunpoint outside. Buffy exits and the couple's fate is up to Boy's friends, one of whom is a sheriff - but, despite the crime, the two are told to leave immediately in their car. Boy's friends set the cabin ablaze as a funeral pyre.

Harry and Buffy drive along out of the desert disoriented, exhausted and silent. They hold hands and Harry asks Buffy if she's okay. She replies that she is not as she glances back at the fire's glow. The couple fall silent again.

== Cast ==
- River Phoenix as Boy
- Judy Davis as Buffy Fletcher
- Jonathan Pryce as Harry Fletcher
- Karen Black as Motel Woman
- T. Dan Hopkins as Joe Tapesi
- Lorne Miller as Mechanic / Motel Woman's Son
- Julius Drum as Indian #1
- John Trudell as Indian #2
- Rodney A. Grant as Indian #3
- George Aguilar as Indian #4
- Stephen Silberkraus as The Fletcher's Son
- George Sluizer as Narrator

== Production ==
Dark Blood began shooting on September 21, 1993, and consisted of roughly five weeks of on location shooting in Torrey, Utah and was scheduled to complete three weeks of filming interior scenes in Los Angeles, California on a sound stage. Parts of the film were also shot in Gallup, New Mexico. There is a scene shot at Mesa Verde National Park in Montezuma County, Colorado. The film had a budget of under $10 million. Filming was 80% finished before Phoenix's death on October 31, 1993. Production halted while insurers and financiers tried to determine if the movie could be completed, but with important scenes still needing to be shot, the film was abandoned on November 18 of that same year. The film was due to be released in the United States by Fine Line Features and by New Line internationally. For the 2012 release, roughly four to six missing scenes were replaced with Sluizer providing narration.

It was revealed in October 2011 that director George Sluizer had held onto the footage, fearing it would be destroyed, and that he had reedited the material and believed that with some adjustments a completed film could be released in 2012. In 1999, the insurance company that owned the negatives wanted to stop paying storage costs, so they considered having the film destroyed. Sluizer entered the storage area that held the negative and removed it. It was speculated that Sluizer would ask Phoenix's younger brother Joaquin Phoenix to dub River's voice. The Phoenix family made it clear that they would not participate in the project, saying in a statement, "In regard to releasing River's last film, Joaquin Phoenix and his family have not been in communication with the director nor will they participate in any way.”

On May 18, 2012, a trailer for the film and an interview with Sluizer were released on YouTube. The film premiered to an invited audience on September 27, 2012, at the Netherlands Film Festival in Utrecht, Netherlands. It had its international premiere out of competition at the 63rd Berlin International Film Festival. A region-free DVD (in English with optional German subtitles) was released in Germany in January 2018 by Missing Films.

== Reception ==
On Rotten Tomatoes, the film received four positive reviews and one negative one, for a score of 80%, with an average rating of 6/10.

Geoffrey Macnab from The Guardian gave the film three out of five stars, stating that "Dark Blood is fragmentary, uneven and downright odd in parts but it also has huge curiosity value. The director's solution for bridging the considerable gaps is to read out descriptions of what is missing. It's a simple but surprisingly effective tactic. His narration ensures that the film is just about coherent." Ard Vijn from Twitch says the movie is "almost polished enough to be regarded as a finished film. Almost. The images, music and actors definitely make watching it a worthwhile exercise."
