= K-X-P =

Finnish electronic rock band

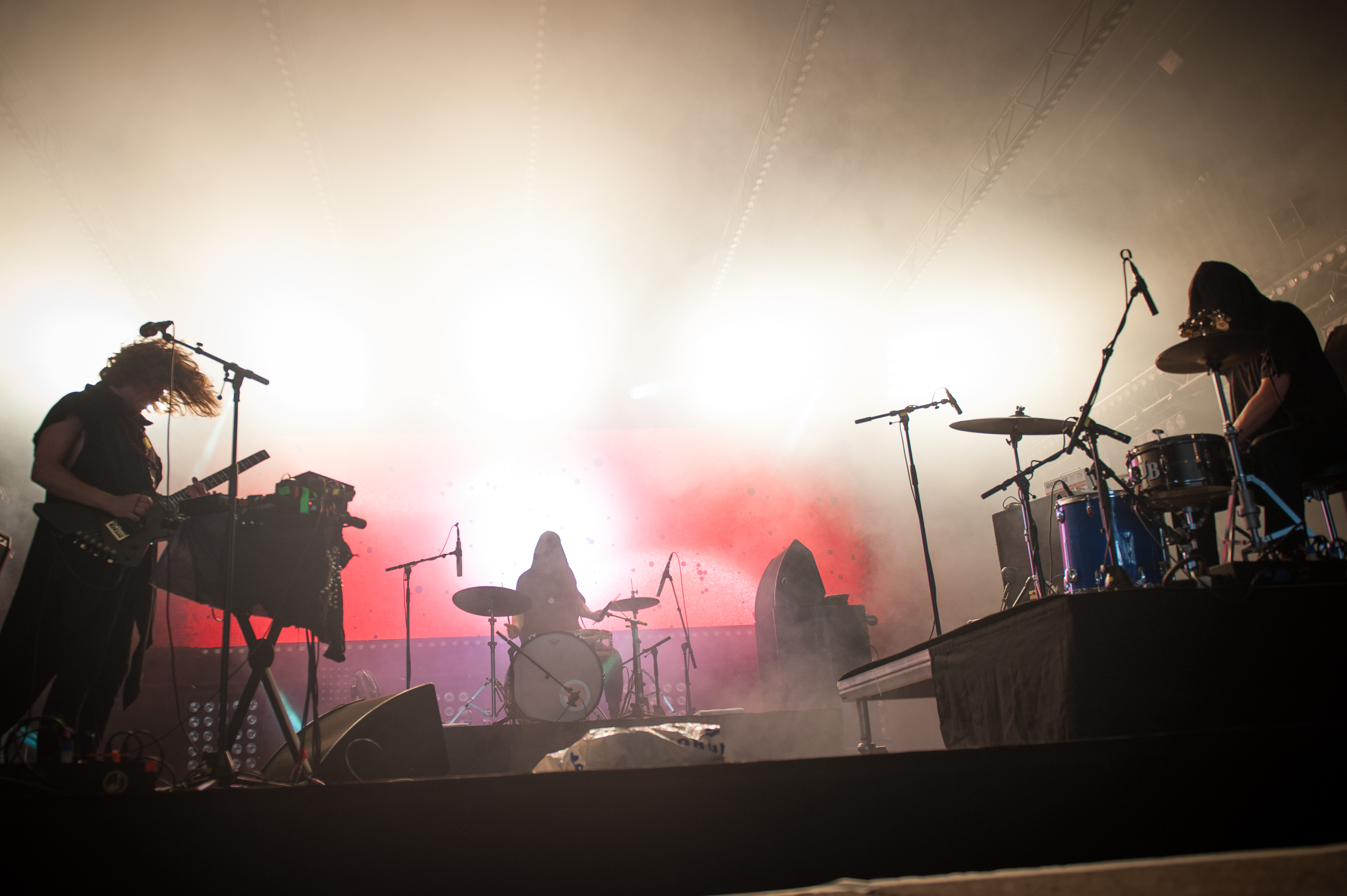
- K-X-P performing at Flow Festival in Helsinki, August 2015.

Background information
- Origin: Helsinki, Finland
- Genres: Electronic
- Members: Timo Kaukolampi; Tomi Leppänen; Anssi Nykänen

K-X-P is an electronic rock band from Helsinki, Finland. The band consists of Timo Kaukolampi (vocals, electronics and guitar), Tomi Leppänen (drums), Anssi Nykänen (drums), and Tuomo Puranen (bass). For their second album II the band are signed to Melodic Records in the UK.

== History ==
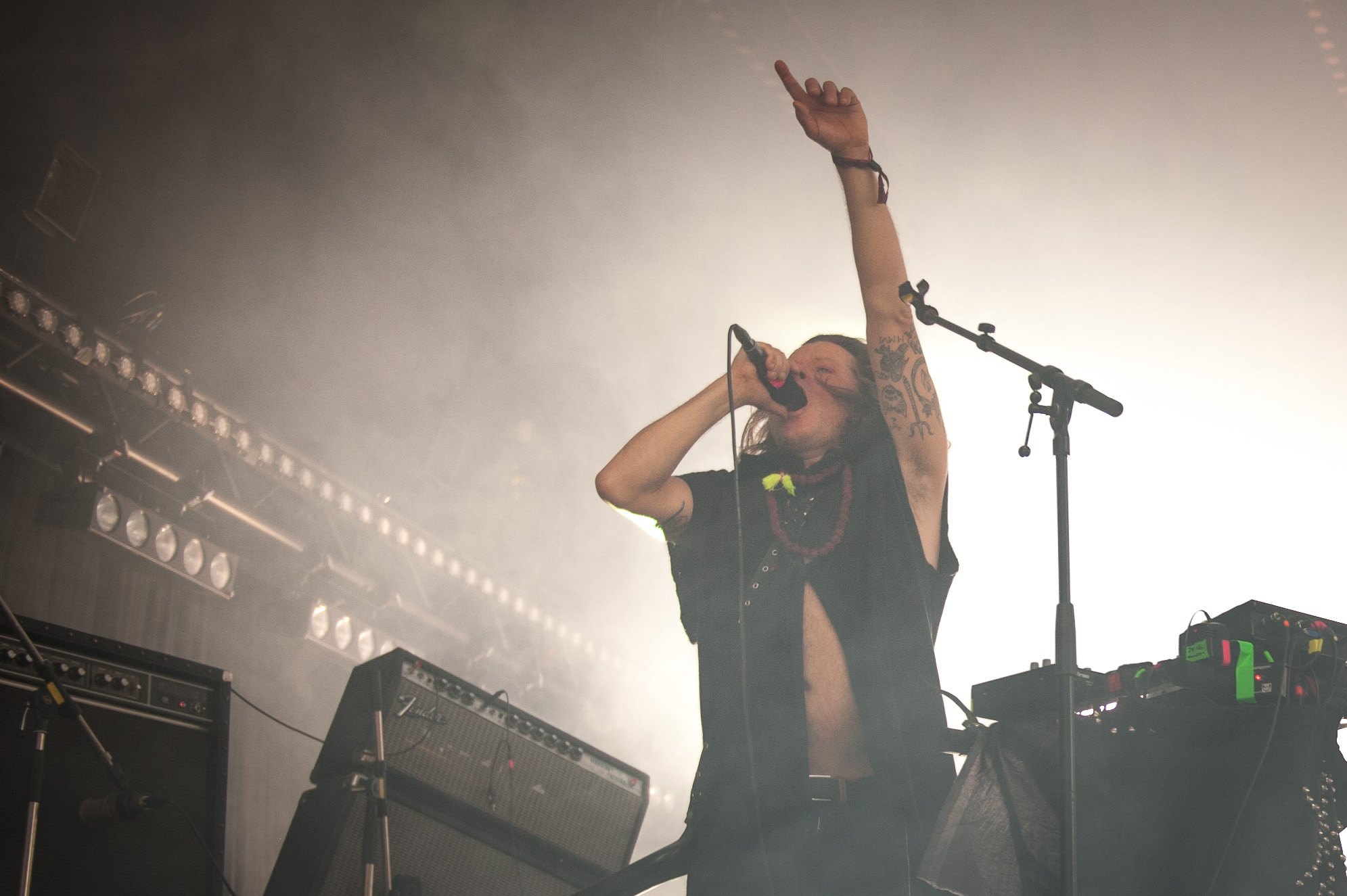
Timo Kaukolampi of K-X-P performing at Flow Festival in Helsinki, August 2015

Both Kaukolampi and Puranen were part of Op:l Bastards, before forming K-X-P in 2006. The band existed only in studio live jam sessions until their demos reached the Smalltown Supersound label (Norway).

K-X-P was first called K-N-P, from Kaukolampi, Nykänen, Puranen. Anssi Nykänen (the N) was always playing other shows with various bands and artists, so the N became X marking mystery revolving spot for drummer. K-X-P records nowadays with both drummers Anssi Nykänen and Tomi Leppänen in the studio. There have been rare live concerts with both of them onstage. Tomi Leppänen, who also plays with Circle, Aavikko and Pharaoh Overlord has been the regular for most live shows. Lauri Porra, Finnish bassist of Stratovarius is also often playing with the band both on stage and on their records.

In 2017 band members Tuomo Puranen and Timo Kaukolampi composed a soundtrack for a feature film Euthanizer. Their work won in the best film soundtrack category in Jussi Awards 2018.

In 2024, Kaukolampi and Puranen composed the score for the occult documentary Shadowland.

== Releases ==
In 2010 the band released their first record, the self-titled K-X-P, earning favourable reviews from Q, Future Music, Pitchfork and XLR8R.

They describe their sound as "Original - Electronic - Motorhead - Space - Trance - Spiritual - Rock - Meditation - Freejazz". Reviews from the likes of Mojo and Clash Magazine also define the sound as having a strong krautrock element.

Publications like UNCUT have reviewed their music as "Fertile experiments, broad and flexible enough to incorporate post-punk, glam-rock and goth-metal elements" and Pitchfork stated "their music is incredibly rhythmic, their grooves—paranoid dark disco and motorik—deep.'

The band released a second album in February 2013 entitled II and rated 7/10 on Pitchfork. They toured in support of the album from March 2013 onwards.

Third K-X-P album was released by Svart Records in two parts, III Part 1 in 2015 and III Part 2 in 2016. Both got good reviews on Q Magazine and The Wire.

In summer 2018 the band released a self published limited edition "white label" vinyl LP of previously unreleased music, that was only available for sale at their live gigs.

The fourth K-X-P album titled IV was released by Svart Records in May 2019.

== Live ==
The band are noted for their intense live performance featuring costumes, audience interaction, and experimentation with different instruments. They have supported and toured with James Blake, Zombie Zombie and Moon Duo, amongst others.
