= Julius Drum =

Native American actor (1958-2007)

- Born: March 18, 1958; Winnebago, Nebraska, US
- Died: September 17, 2007 (aged 49); Macy, Nebraska, US
- Other name: Julius Corder
- Occupation: Actor
- Known for: Thunderheart, Dark Blood

Julius Drum (March 18, 1958– September 17, 2007), also known as Julius L. Corder, was an American actor.

== Biography ==
Born in Winnebago, Nebraska, Drum was adopted at the age of five by John and Dorothy Corder of McCook, Nebraska. Upon graduating from school, he entered medical school in California and supported himself as a television commercial actor. He was a member of the Screen Actors Guild.

Drum played Richard Yellow Hawk in the 1992 movie, Thunderheart. He also acted in the 2012 movie, Dark Blood, although the movie was not released during Drum's lifetime.

He had been involved with the Lincoln Indian Center and was active in the American Indian Movement. He received the Outstanding New Performer award from First Americans in the Arts for his work in Thunderheart.

Complications from diabetes forced Drum to seek help at the Carl T. Curtis Health Center in Macy, Nebraska. He died at the center on September 17, 2007.

== Filmography ==
Year	Title	Role	Notes
1992	Thunderheart	Richard Yellow Hawk	
2012	Dark Blood	Indian #1	(final film role)
