= Bokshu – The Myth =

Indian English language movie

- Poster
- Directed by: Shyamaprasad
- Written by: Shyamaprasad; Richard Stanley; Shashi Warrier
- Produced by: M P S Prasad
- Starring: Steven Berkoff; Irrfan Khan; Heather Prete; David Millbern; Nandana Sen; Vineeth
- Cinematography: Torben Fosberg
- Edited by: A. Sreekar Prasad
- Music by: Louis Banks
- Production company: Arjun Creations
- Release dates: 2002; 22 May 2006 (Cannes Film Festival)
- Country: India
- Language: English

Bokshu – The Myth is a 2002 Indian English-language psychological thriller film directed by Shyamaprasad and starring Steven Berkoff, Irrfan Khan, Heather Prete, David Millbern, Nandana Sen and Vineeth. The storyline is based on Ganga Prasad Vimal's novel Mrigaantak. The film was released in film festivals.

== Cast ==
- Steven Berkoff as Professor Metcalf
- Irrfan Khan as High priest
- Heather Prete as Metcalf's daughter (anthropologist)
- David Millbern as Metcalf's daughter's friend (anthropologist)
- Nandana Sen as Rati
- Harish Patel
- Vineeth as Rati's lover
- Ashok Mandanna
- Surekha Sikri
- Mita Vashisht
- Khalid Tyabj

== Production ==
The film was first shot in Hampi (which resembled the Jaled village in the Himalayas) for sixty days with a cave set erected by Thota Tharani. The film was then shot at various locations in the Himayalas including Kedarnath. Steven Berkoff's character transforms into a tiger.

== Reception ==
Deborah Young of Variety wrote that "Bokshu, the Myth hits every cliche in the book, yet still gets across some sense of the power of myth over human life".
