= Richard Stanley (director) =

South African filmmaker

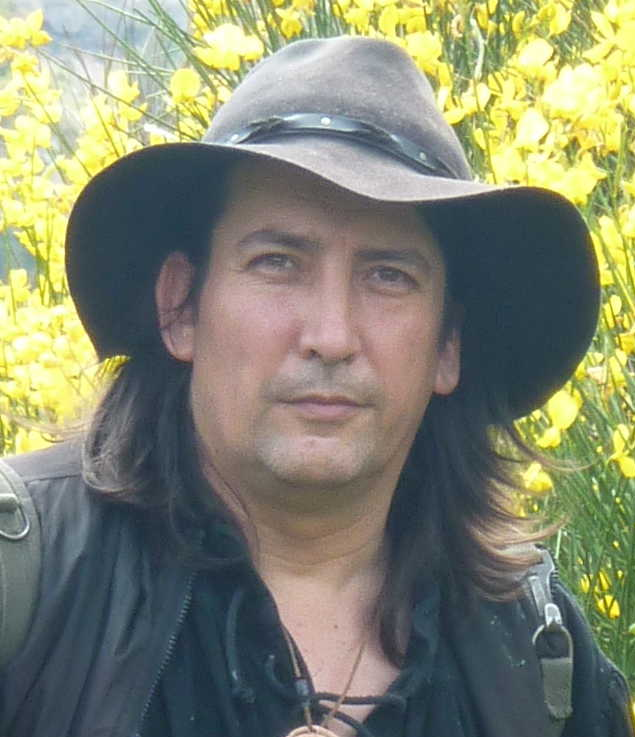
- Stanley in 2010
- Born: 22 November 1966 (age 59); Fishhook, South Africa
- Occupations: Film director; producer; screenwriter
- Years active: 1983–present
- Mother: Penny Miller
- Relatives: Henry Morton Stanley Mike McMahon
- Website: theofficialrichardstanley.com

Richard Gilbert Varney Stanley is a South African filmmaker, known for his work in the horror genre. He began his career making short films and music videos, and subsequently directed the feature films Hardware (1990) and Dust Devil (1992). He was the original director of The Island of Dr. Moreau (1996), but was fired early into principal photography due to creative differences, an episode recounted in the 2014 documentary Lost Soul: The Doomed Journey of Richard Stanley's Island of Dr. Moreau. In 2019, he returned to feature films after more than twenty years, directing the H. P. Lovecraft adaptation Color Out of Space.

== Career ==
=== Early career (1983–1987) ===
Stanley's first foray into film making began in high school where he joined the Young Filmmaker's Workshop. Here he created his first film, Rites of Passage. Shot on super-8 stock, the 10-minute short film draws comparisons between modern man and primitive man. The short eventually won Stanley the IAC International Student Film Trophy film award in 1984.

Stanley followed his first success with the ambitious 45-minute 8 mm short Incidents in an Expanding Universe. Set in a future dystopia, the film laid the groundwork for Stanley's cyberpunk feature debut Hardware. It won the IAC Gold Seal Award and was eventually made available on the Severin Films DVD release of Hardware.

In the mid-1980s, Stanley began work on two more shorts. In a Season of Soft Rains was another futuristic journey, but a majority of the footage has been lost. Dust Devil was his first work on 16 mm. Inspired by a series of unsolved murders in Namibia, this short was unfinished but footage can be viewed on the Subversive Cinema DVD release of the feature Dust Devil.

=== Music videos (1987–1990) ===
Following the move to London, England, Stanley began working in music videos in 1987. He directed videos for bands including Fields of the Nephilim, Pop Will Eat Itself, and Renegade Soundwave.

In the late 1980s Stanley traveled to Afghanistan to document the Soviet–Afghan War. Stanley and his crew witnessed the Soviet Army's withdrawal and the country's slide into the civil war that would bring the Taliban to power. The resulting documentary, Voice of the Moon, is a 30-minute look at the daily lives of the Afghan people trying to survive. Stanley was present at the siege of Jalalabad, and the events surrounding his escape from the country, along with his wounded camera man, Immo Horn, later formed the basis of the screenplay Addicted to Danger, by Sebastian Junger. The documentary is available on the Subversive Cinema DVD release of the feature Dust Devil.

=== Mainstream breakthrough (1990–1996) ===
Stanley made his feature film directing debut with the post-apocalyptic science fiction film Hardware in 1990. The film included cameos by musicians Iggy Pop, Carl McCoy and Lemmy. Shot for approximately £960,000, it was eventually picked up by the Weinstein brothers and released theatrically in the United States through their early Millimeter Films division.

Stanley returned to his South African roots with the supernatural horror film Dust Devil in 1992. He had intended it to be his first film, having written the screenplay for it when he was 16 years old. The full director's cut was officially released on DVD by Subversive Cinema in September 2006.

In 1994, Stanley directed a 50-minute length video for Marillion's concept album, Brave, which has since been released on DVD. He would later disown the result, claiming the material was re-edited to cover the overall running time without his consent.

=== The Island of Dr. Moreau (1996) ===
Stanley's next project was the third major movie version of the H. G. Wells novel The Island of Doctor Moreau for New Line Cinema in 1996. An ambitious project attempting to stay true to the source material, the film's production was fraught with problems from the start, with Stanley being undercut by his belligerent lead actors, suspicious studio and a sudden burst of bad weather; he was fired and replaced by John Frankenheimer a week after shooting began. The details of Stanley's involvement in the film, which ultimately veered far from his original vision, are captured in the 2014 documentary Lost Soul: The Doomed Journey of Richard Stanley's Island of Dr. Moreau.

=== Indie film writing and documentaries (1996–2019) ===
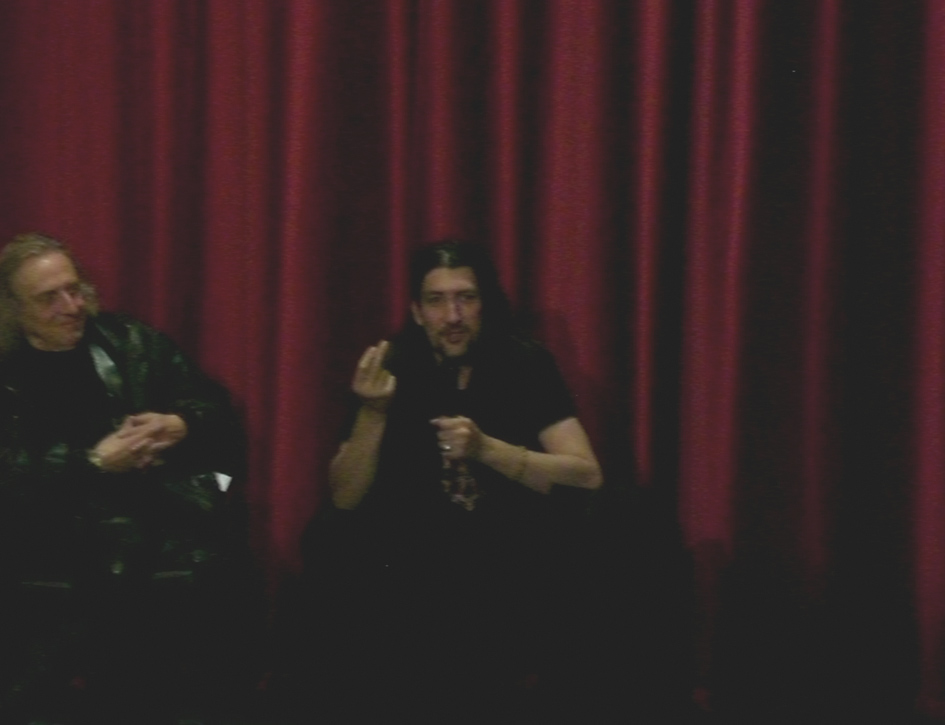
Richard Stanley in Edinburgh, February 2008

Stanley completed The Secret Glory – an examination of SS officer Otto Rahn's search for the Holy Grail – in 2001 and The White Darkness – a look at the voodoo practices in Haiti – in 2002. Following several festival screenings, both documentaries appeared in the Dust Devil DVD box-set, released by Subversive Cinema in 2006.

Stanley's cinematic efforts include a number of short films. Children of the Kingdom appeared in the short-film collection Europe – 99euro-films 2 in 2003. The science fiction story The Sea of Perdition premiered in October 2006 at the Festival de Cine de Sitges, and has since been made available online and on the 2009 Severin DVD release of Hardware. The werewolf short Black Tulips premiered online in September 2008.

Stanley was a contributing writer-director to the 2011 omnibus The Theatre Bizarre, with an adaptation of the short story "Mother of Toads" by Clark Ashton Smith.

In addition to directing, Stanley has continued working as a screenwriter. He co-wrote the script for Nacho Cerdà's feature debut The Abandoned (2006) and delivered the screenplay for Cerdà's upcoming comic book adaptation I Am Legion (2012). In addition, Stanley was a script collaborator on the Italian horror-thriller Imago Mortis (2009). Stanley also co-wrote an unmade film adaptation of J. G. Ballard's High Rise with director Vincenzo Natali.

Stanley launched the interactive website Terra Umbra – Empire of Shadows in October 2009, an ongoing inquiry into the invisible world and the hidden history of southern and central Europe. He also released the e-book Shadow of the Grail – Magic and Mystery at Montsegur in December 2010.

In early 2012, it was announced that Stanley would collaborate on the anthology film The Profane Exhibit. Stanley's contribution will be the short Coltan, which is described as "an unflinching look into darkest Africa."

=== Return to mainstream (2018–present) ===
In December 2018, it was announced Stanley was returning to film with an adaptation of The Colour Out of Space with Nicolas Cage set to star. The film, Color Out of Space, was released in 2020 and became a critical success with Stanley being praised for his return.

In a Q&A session upon the release of the film, Stanley revealed it was the first in a trilogy of H.P. Lovecraft adaptations, and that he was currently writing an adaptation of The Dunwich Horror.

In March 2025, it was announced Stanley had been signed as executive producer on Michael Zaiko Hall's dark thriller The Palace. John Fessler from Side Street Studios is set to produce along with Ascent Films. Casting is underway with the film due to shoot in late summer in Salem, Massachusetts. The film, which will be billed as "Richard Stanley Presents The Palace", is described by producers as "a 1960s thriller homage with an underlying commentary on the current state of cinema".

In August 2025, it was reported that Stanley would write the screenplay for The Twisted Childhood Universe film Winnie-the-Pooh: Blood and Honey 3 – The Lost Years.

Shooting commenced on Stanley's latest project in August 2025, Steel Donkeys, a psychedelic horror comedy based on his own screenplay.

=== Paranormal journalist and historian (2007–present) ===
Stanley has contributed papers on esoteric history to the Sauniere Society journal and multiple feature articles to the Fortean Times, the United Kingdom's foremost paranormal journal. His biography of the German Holy Grail historian, Otto Rahn – Grail Hunter was published in the United States by Inner Traditions in August 2025.

=== Controversy ===
In March 2021, screenwriter Scarlett Amaris, who collaborated with Stanley on several projects (including Color Out of Space), claimed in a blog post that she had been in an abusive relationship with him. Subsequently SpectreVision, which produced Color Out of Space, announced it would no longer work with Stanley and that all future revenue from the film would be donated to unspecified anti-domestic violence charities.

On 25 October 2021, entertainment news outlet Deadline reported Stanley has filed criminal complaints against Amaris for libel, harassment and loss of income. The 2024 documentary film Shadowland includes Stanley's commentary on the allegations. Shadowland producer Kalle Kinnunen alleged in 2024 that investigations were ongoing in France.

== Filmography ==
=== Short film ===
Year	Title	Director	Writer	Notes
1983	Rites of Passage	Yes	Yes	
1985	Incidents in an Expanding Universe	Yes	Yes	
1993	Preacher Man	Yes	Yes	Segments of Fields of the Nephilim: Revelations
1993	Blue Water	Yes	Yes	Segments of Fields of the Nephilim: Revelations
2003	Children of the Kingdom	Yes	Yes	Segment of Europe – 99euro-films 2
2006	The Sun's Gone Dim	Yes	Yes	
2006	The Sea of Perdition	Yes	Yes	
2008	Black Tulips	Yes	Yes	
2011	The Mother of Toads	Yes	Yes	Segment of The Theatre Bizarre

=== Feature film ===
Year	Title	Director	Writer	Notes
1990	Hardware	Yes	Yes	
1992	Dust Devil	Yes	Yes	
1994	Brave	Yes	Yes	Long-form music video Written with Steve Hogarth
1996	The Island of Dr. Moreau	No	Yes	Replaced as director by John Frankenheimer; Written with Ron Hutchinson
2002	Bokshu – The Myth	No	Yes	Written with Shyamaprasad and Shashi Warrier
2006	The Abandoned	No	Yes	Written with Nacho Cerdà and Karim Hussain
2009	Imago Mortis	No	Yes	Written with Luiso Berdejo
2017	Replace	No	Yes	Written with Norbert Keil
2019	Color Out of Space	Yes	Yes	Written with Scarlett Amaris
2027	Winnie-the-Pooh: Blood and Honey 3 – The Lost Years	No	Yes	Post-production; Also cast as Balthazar von Woozle
TBA	Steel Donkeys	Yes	Yes	Post-production

=== Documentary film ===
Year	Title	Director	Writer	Producer	Notes
1990	Voice of the Moon	Yes	Yes	No	Documentary short
2001	The Secret Glory	Yes	Yes	Yes	
2002	The White Darkness	Yes	Yes	Yes	
2013	L'autre monde (The Otherworld)	Yes	Yes	No	
2024	Shadowland	No	No	No	Documentary subject

Interviewee

- Jodorowsky's Dune (2013)
- Lost Soul: The Doomed Journey of Richard Stanley's Island of Dr. Moreau (2014)
- 78/52 The Hitchcock Shower Scene (2017)
- Exgesis Lovecraft (2021)
