= Inherent Vice (film) =

2014 film by Paul Thomas Anderson

- Theatrical release poster
- Directed by: Paul Thomas Anderson
- Screenplay by: Paul Thomas Anderson
- Based on: Inherent Vice by Thomas Pynchon
- Produced by: JoAnne Sellar; Daniel Lupi; Paul Thomas Anderson
- Starring: Joaquin Phoenix; Josh Brolin; Owen Wilson; Katherine Waterston; Reese Witherspoon; Benicio del Toro; Jena Malone; Maya Rudolph; Martin Short; Joanna Newsom
- Cinematography: Robert Elswit
- Edited by: Leslie Jones
- Music by: Jonny Greenwood
- Production companies: IAC Films; RatPac-Dune Entertainment; Ghoulardi Film Company
- Distributed by: Warner Bros. Pictures
- Release dates: October 4, 2014 (NYFF); December 12, 2014 (United States)
- Running time: 149 minutes
- Country: United States
- Language: English
- Budget: $20 million
- Box office: $14.8 million

Inherent Vice is a 2014 American neo-noir black comedy crime film written, co-produced, and directed by Paul Thomas Anderson, based on the 2009 novel by Thomas Pynchon. The ensemble cast includes Joaquin Phoenix, Josh Brolin, Owen Wilson, Katherine Waterston, Eric Roberts, Reese Witherspoon, Benicio del Toro, Jena Malone, Maya Rudolph, Martin Short and Joanna Newsom. The film follows Larry "Doc" Sportello, a well-intentioned but fumbling stoner, hippie, and private investigator embroiled in the criminal underworld of 1970 Los Angeles, investigating three cases linked by the disappearance of his ex-girlfriend and her wealthy new boyfriend.

Anderson's adaptation of Inherent Vice had been in development since 2010, and is the first adaptation of a Pynchon novel for the screen. Anderson was previously inspired by Pynchon's novel V. while writing the screenplay for The Master (2012), and would go on to loosely adapt Vineland into One Battle After Another (2025). It is Anderson's second collaboration with Phoenix, following The Master, and involves a number of his other collaborators, including producers Daniel Lupi and JoAnne Sellar, cinematographer Robert Elswit, editor Leslie Jones, and composer Jonny Greenwood.

Inherent Vice premiered at the New York Film Festival on October 4, 2014, and began a limited theatrical release in the United States on December 12, 2014, by Warner Bros. Pictures. The film received positive reviews from critics, with many praising the performances, costumes, and screenplay, but some criticizing the complicated plot. It was nominated for several awards, including Best Adapted Screenplay and Best Costume Design at the 87th Academy Awards, and Best Actor – Motion Picture Musical or Comedy for Phoenix at the 72nd Golden Globe Awards. The National Board of Review named it one of the ten best films of the year. It is considered a cult film.In 2016, it was voted the 75th best film since 2000 in the BBC's international critics' poll.

== Plot ==
In 1970, Shasta Fay Hepworth visits the home of her ex-boyfriend, Larry "Doc" Sportello, a private investigator and hippie in Gordita Beach, Los Angeles County. She tells him about her new lover, Michael Z. "Mickey" Wolfmann, a wealthy real estate developer, and asks him to help prevent Mickey's wife and her lover from abducting Mickey and committing him to an insane asylum.

Doc meets with Tariq Khalil, a member of the Black Guerrilla Family, who hires him to find Glen Charlock, a member of the Aryan Brotherhood he met in jail, who owes him money and is one of Wolfmann's bodyguards. He visits Mickey's Channel View Estates project, entering the only business in the developing strip mall, a massage parlor, where he meets an employee, Jade. He searches the premises for Charlock but is knocked unconscious. He awakes outside, lying next to Charlock's dead body and surrounded by policemen. Interrogated by LAPD detective Christian F. "Bigfoot" Bjornsen, he learns that Wolfmann has disappeared. His attorney, Sauncho Smilax, arranges for his release by the LAPD.

Doc is hired by former heroin addict Hope Harlingen, who is looking for her missing husband, Coy. Although told that Coy is dead, she believes he is alive due to a large deposit in her bank account. Doc is questioned by the FBI about his meeting with Tariq Khalil, and he discovers that they want to publicly frame Wolfmann's disappearance and Charlock's murder as the work of the Black Panthers. Jade leaves Doc a message apologizing for ambushing him with the police and telling him to "beware the Golden Fang." He meets her in an alley, where Jade introduces Doc to Coy, who tells him he is hiding at a house in Topanga Canyon. Doc talks to Sauncho, who tells him about a suspicious boat, the Golden Fang. Sauncho reveals to Doc that the FBI wanted Wolfmann to be involved in construction in Las Vegas, and the last time the Golden Fang sailed, Wolfmann was seen and Shasta was on board.

In a later meeting at a party, Coy explains he is a police informant, currently infiltrating various counterculture groups on behalf of the right-wing militia Vigilant California, and fears for his life, wanting only to return to his wife and daughter. After Doc encounters Jade and leaves her at her house, she explains to Doc that the Golden Fang is an international drug smuggling operation. Thanks to a postcard from Shasta, Doc finds a large building shaped like a golden fang and meets dentist Rudy Blatnoyd. Bigfoot meets Doc in a diner, telling him that Blatnoyd has been found dead with fang bites on his neck and commenting about Puck Beaverton, an associate of loan shark Adrian Prussia. Doc travels to Chryskylodon, an asylum run by a cult connected to the Golden Fang. There, Doc glimpses Puck and Coy, and finds Mickey, who is being monitored by the FBI. Mickey tells him he felt guilty for the negativity his real-estate business caused and wanted to use all of his money to make housing free, appearing now to be brainwashed not to do so. When Doc returns home to his beach house, he is greeted by Shasta, who tells him Mickey is back with his wife and confesses to having been on the Golden Fang with Mickey, before having sex together.

Penny, an assistant district attorney with whom Doc is having an affair, gives him confidential files from which he learns that the LAPD pays Adrian, who is tied to the Golden Fang, to kill people and that one of his victims was Bigfoot's former partner. Doc visits Adrian, but is attacked and imprisoned by Puck. He manages to escape, killing both Puck and Adrian. Bigfoot appears and rescues him, driving him home, but Doc discovers he has been set up: Bigfoot has planted heroin in his car (stolen from the Golden Fang as revenge for murdering his partner). Doc arranges for the drugs to be returned to the Golden Fang in exchange for Coy's freedom, as the Golden Fang runs Vigilant California. He drives Coy home and watches as he's reunited with Hope. Bigfoot visits Doc and apologizes for framing him, before leaving. Doc and Shasta drive off together, and they both say this does not mean they are back together.

== Cast ==
- Joaquin Phoenix as Larry "Doc" Sportello
- Josh Brolin as Lieutenant Christian F. "Bigfoot" Bjornsen
- Owen Wilson as Coy Harlingen
- Katherine Waterston as Shasta Fay Hepworth
- Reese Witherspoon as Deputy District Attorney Penny Kimball
- Benicio del Toro as Sauncho Smilax, Esq.
- Jena Malone as Hope Harlingen
- Joanna Newsom as Sortilège, who is also the narrator
- Jordan Christian Hearn as Denis
- Hong Chau as Jade
- Jeannie Berlin as Aunt Reet
- Maya Rudolph as Petunia Leeway
- Michael Kenneth Williams as Tariq Khalil
- Michelle Sinclair as Clancy Charlock
- Elaine Tan as Xandra
- Martin Short as Dr. Rudy Blatnoyd, D.D.S.
- Sasha Pieterse as Japonica Fenway
- Martin Donovan as Crocker Fenway
- Eric Roberts as Michael Z. "Mickey" Wolfmann
- Jillian Bell as Chlorinda
- Serena Scott Thomas as Sloane Wolfmann
- Yvette Yates as Luz
- Andrew Simpson as Riggs Warbling
- Jefferson Mays as Dr. Threeply, Chryskylodon Institute
- Keith Jardine as Puck Beaverton
- Peter McRobbie as Adrian Prussia
- Sam Jaeger as FBI Agent Flatweed
- Timothy Simons as FBI Agent Borderline
- Samantha Lemole as Golden Fang Mother
- Madison Leisle as Golden Fang Daughter
- Matt Doyle as Golden Fang Father
- Liam Van Joosten as Golden Fang Son

== Production ==
=== Development ===
It was first reported in December 2010 that Paul Thomas Anderson wanted to adapt Inherent Vice; at the time, he had been writing a treatment and started on a script after The Master (2012) had been shelved indefinitely months prior. Anderson originally adapted the entire 384-page novel sentence by sentence which made it easier for him to cut down the script than the novel. By February 2011, Anderson had written a first draft and was more than halfway done with a second draft. The first draft was written without a narrator but the character of Sortilège was later turned into the voice of the narrator. In September 2012, Anderson stated that he was still writing the script but was hoping he could get Inherent Vice into production and have a few years of being more productive.

This is the first film adaptation from a Thomas Pynchon novel, with Anderson describing it "like a Cheech & Chong movie". Years prior, Anderson considered adapting Pynchon's 1990 novel Vineland, but could not figure out how. (He would ultimately direct a loose adaptation of Vineland in 2025.) When Inherent Vice came out, he was drawn to it and wrote the film concurrently with The Master. Anderson significantly changed the ending from the novel and described the novel as "deeply written and beautifully profound stuff mixed in with just the best fart jokes and poop jokes that you can imagine." Anderson drew inspiration from The Big Sleep (1946), Kiss Me Deadly (1955), Raymond Chandler's The Long Goodbye (1973), and Cheech & Chong's Up in Smoke (1978). Anderson has said he tried to cram as many jokes onto the screen as Pynchon squeezed onto the page and that the visual gags and gimmicks were inspired by Zucker, Abrahams and Zucker-style slapstick spoofs like the 1982 television series Police Squad!, and the films Airplane! (1980) and Top Secret! (1984). Anderson also used the underground comic strip Fabulous Furry Freak Brothers as what he has described as an invaluable "research bible" for the writing process.

=== Casting ===
Robert Downey Jr. was reportedly interested in the role of Larry "Doc" Sportello and was making plans to start shooting in the fall of 2011 since he had dropped out of Oz the Great and Powerful (2013). Downey Jr. stated in December 2011 that the planned collaboration was "probably true". In January 2013, it was reported that Joaquin Phoenix was in talks for the lead and that Downey Jr. had ultimately passed on the role. Downey Jr. later said that Anderson wanted to make the film with Phoenix because he was too old.

In May 2013, it was reported that Benicio del Toro, Owen Wilson, Reese Witherspoon, Martin Short, and Jena Malone were in talks to join the film. In May 2013, it was reported that Josh Brolin joined the cast and that Katherine Waterston joined as the lead female role. In June 2013, it was reported that Peter McRobbie and Sasha Pieterse joined the cast. In July 2013, it was reported that Timothy Simons joined the cast. In October 2013, it was reported that Michael K. Williams joined the cast.

In September 2014, it was reported that Pynchon may have a cameo appearance in the film, which Anderson would not confirm, citing Pynchon's choice to stay out of the public spotlight. Brolin went as far as to confirm the cameo and claimed that Pynchon was on set but that nobody knew it was him as he stayed in the corner.

=== Filming ===
Principal photography began in May 2013, and it was reported that shooting was to take place until August 2, 2013. Shooting permits in California covered a San Fernando Valley warehouse, a storefront on Slauson Boulevard, driving shots in the Canoga Park area, driving shots in canyon roads above Malibu and a warehouse in Chinatown. In June 2013, filming also took place in Pasadena, and aboard the tall ship American Pride located in Long Beach.

The set has been described as organized chaos, but the cast felt protected when they took big risks. Short stated, "If you're working with a great director, you feel very, very, very safe because you know that all the decisions will be made months later in the editing room." Malone stated that "it was a very structured process" and that the "chaos can only come from a grounded, logical base because you have to know where you're going to be spinning from. The logic becomes the chaos and the chaos becomes the logic."

According to Waterston, Anderson did not have a clear goal while on set but it did not feel chaotic. Brolin said, "It was crazy, chaotic but really, really gratifying." Brolin also stated that there was "a really strange lack of pretense" but that Anderson would work with the actors when they felt something was not working. Pieterse stated that Anderson allowed "freedom and flexibility to really dive into your character and shape the scene". Wilson said, "Sometimes I wouldn't necessarily know what I was doing. We were encouraged to kind of do anything."

== Soundtrack ==
The Inherent Vice soundtrack was composed by Radiohead guitarist Jonny Greenwood, recorded with the Royal Philharmonic Orchestra in London. It was Greenwood's third collaboration with Anderson, following There Will Be Blood (2007) and The Master. The soundtrack also includes tracks from the late 1960s and early 1970s by Neil Young, Can, and the Marketts, among others. It was released by Nonesuch Records on December 16.

== Release ==
Inherent Vice premiered as the centerpiece at the New York Film Festival on October 4, 2014. The film received a limited release on December 12, 2014, before being released in 645 theaters on January 9, 2015.

== Reception ==
=== Box office ===
Inherent Vice grossed $8.1 million in the United States and Canada, and $6.7 million internationally, for a worldwide total of $14.8 million.

In its limited opening weekend, the film made $328,184 from five theaters. It expanded in its fourth week, grossing $2.8 million from 645 theaters, and then made $1.1 million from 653 theaters in its fifth weekend.

=== Critical response ===
On the review aggregator website Rotten Tomatoes, 73% of 253 critics' reviews are positive, with an average rating of 7.3/10. The website's consensus reads: "Inherent Vice may prove frustrating for viewers who demand absolute coherence, but it does justice to its acclaimed source material – and should satisfy fans of director P.T. Anderson." Metacritic, which uses a weighted average, assigned the film a score of 81 out of 100, based on 43 critics, indicating "universal acclaim".

Film Journal International's Ethan Alter commented that the film is "confounding, challenging and consistently unique." IGN reviewer Matt Patches gave the film an 8.9 out of 10 score, saying "There's nothing certain – a surprisingly rewarding sensation that demands repeat viewings. There's so much, too much, to soak up, and all the laughter Anderson piles on top of the thematics means there's plenty to miss. Inherent Vice is a high grain strain: Provocative, hilarious, and its own breed of weird." Collider's Adam Chitwood named it one of the top ten films of 2014.

The film was ranked 75th in a survey of 177 critics conducted by the BBC in 2016 to determine the 100 best films of the 21st century.

In 2025, it was one of the films voted for the "Readers' Choice" edition of The New York Times' list of "The 100 Best Movies of the 21st Century," finishing at number 287.

=== Top ten lists ===
Inherent Vice was listed on many film critics' top ten lists of 2014 films.

- 1st: Drew McWeeny, HitFix
- 1st: Glenn Kenny & Matt Zoller Seitz, RogerEbert.com
- 1st: Ben Kenigsberg, The A.V. Club
- 1st: Jordan Raup, The Film Stage
- 2nd: RogerEbert.com
- 2nd: J. Hoberman, Artforum
- 2nd: Sasha Stone, Awards Daily
- 2nd: Marlow Stern, The Daily Beast
- 2nd: David Ehrlich, Little White Lies
- 2nd: Mark Olsen, Los Angeles Times
- 3rd: Keith Phipps, The Dissolve
- 3rd: The Guardian
- 3rd: Elizabeth Weitzman, New York Daily News
- 3rd: Kristopher Tapley, HitFix
- 3rd: Andrew O'Hehir, Salon
- 4th: Scott Foundas, Variety
- 5th: Wesley Morris, Grantland
- 5th: Brian Tallerico, RogerEbert.com
- 5th: Adam Chitwood, Collider
- 5th: Gregory Ellwood, HitFix
- 5th: Kimberly Jones, Austin Chronicle
- 6th: Jake Coyle, Associated Press
- 6th: Alison Willmore, BuzzFeed
- 7th: Cahiers du Cinéma
- 8th: Ty Burr, The Boston Globe
- 9th: William Bibbiani, CraveOnline
- 9th: Sight & Sound
- 9th: David Ansen, The Village Voice
- 9th: Betsy Sharkey, Los Angeles Times (tied with A Most Violent Year)
- 10th: Eric Kohn, IndieWire
- 10th: Harry Knowles, Ain't It Cool News
- 10th: Joshua Rothkopf, Time Out New York
- Best of 2014 (listed alphabetically, not ranked): Manohla Dargis, The New York Times

== Accolades ==
Award	Date of ceremony	Category	Recipients	Result	Ref.
87th Academy Awards	February 22, 2015	Best Adapted Screenplay	Paul Thomas Anderson	Nominated	
87th Academy Awards	February 22, 2015	Best Costume Design	Mark Bridges	Nominated	
ACE Eddie Awards	January 30, 2015	Best Edited Feature Film – Comedy or Musical	Leslie Jones	Nominated	
Art Directors Guild Awards	January 31, 2015	Excellence in Production Design for a Period Film	David Crank	Nominated	
Boston Online Film Critics Association	December 6, 2014	The Ten Best Films of the Year		Won	
Boston Society of Film Critics	December 7, 2014	Best Use of Music in a Film	Jonny Greenwood	Won	
Central Ohio Film Critics Association	January 8, 2015	Best Supporting Actor	Josh Brolin	Runner-up (tie)	
Central Ohio Film Critics Association	January 8, 2015	Best Adapted Screenplay	Paul Thomas Anderson	Nominated	
Costume Designers Guild	February 17, 2015	Excellence in Period Film	Mark Bridges	Nominated	
Critics' Choice Movie Awards	January 15, 2015	Best Supporting Actor	Josh Brolin	Nominated	
Critics' Choice Movie Awards	January 15, 2015	Best Adapted Screenplay	Paul Thomas Anderson	Nominated	
Critics' Choice Movie Awards	January 15, 2015	Best Art Direction	David Crank; Amy Wells	Nominated	
Critics' Choice Movie Awards	January 15, 2015	Best Costume Design	Mark Bridges	Nominated	
Denver Film Critics Society	January 12, 2015	Best Picture	Inherent Vice	Nominated	
Denver Film Critics Society	January 12, 2015	Best Director	Paul Thomas Anderson	Nominated	
Denver Film Critics Society	January 12, 2015	Best Supporting Actor	Josh Brolin	Nominated	
Denver Film Critics Society	January 12, 2015	Best Supporting Actress	Katherine Waterston	Nominated	
Denver Film Critics Society	January 12, 2015	Best Adapted Screenplay	Paul Thomas Anderson	Won	
Denver Film Critics Society	January 12, 2015	Best Score	Jonny Greenwood	Nominated	
Film Independent Spirit Awards	February 21, 2015	Robert Altman Award		Won	
Georgia Film Critics Association	January 9, 2015	Best Adapted Screenplay	Paul Thomas Anderson	Nominated	
Georgia Film Critics Association	January 9, 2015	Best Cinematography	Robert Elswit	Nominated	
Georgia Film Critics Association	January 9, 2015	Best Production Design	David Crank	Nominated	
Golden Globe Awards	January 11, 2015	Best Actor in a Motion Picture – Musical or Comedy	Joaquin Phoenix	Nominated	
Houston Film Critics Society Awards	January 12, 2015	Best Picture	Inherent Vice	Nominated	
Houston Film Critics Society Awards	January 12, 2015	Best Director	Paul Thomas Anderson	Nominated	
Houston Film Critics Society Awards	January 12, 2015	Best Supporting Actor	Josh Brolin	Nominated	
Houston Film Critics Society Awards	January 12, 2015	Best Cinematography	Robert Elswit	Nominated	
Houston Film Critics Society Awards	January 12, 2015	Best Poster	Inherent Vice	Nominated	
International Film Music Critics Association Awards	February 19, 2015	Best Original Score for an Action/Adventure/Thriller Film	Jonny Greenwood	Nominated	
London Film Critics' Circle	January 18, 2015	Technical Achievement Award	Mark Bridges (costumes)	Nominated	
Los Angeles Film Critics Association	December 7, 2014	Best Music Score (tied with Mica Levi for Under the Skin)	Jonny Greenwood	Won	
National Board of Review	January 6, 2015	Top 10 Films		Won	
National Board of Review	January 6, 2015	Best Adapted Screenplay	Paul Thomas Anderson	Won	
San Francisco Film Critics Circle	December 14, 2014	Best Adapted Screenplay	Paul Thomas Anderson	Won	
San Francisco Film Critics Circle	December 14, 2014	Best Production Design	David Crank	Nominated	
San Francisco Film Critics Circle	December 14, 2014	Best Editing	Leslie Jones	Nominated	
Satellite Award	February 15, 2015	Best Supporting Actress	Katherine Waterston	Nominated	
Satellite Award	February 15, 2015	Best Adapted Screenplay	Paul Thomas Anderson	Nominated	
Satellite Award	February 15, 2015	Best Cinematography	Robert Elswit	Nominated	
Saturn Award	June 25, 2015	Best Action or Adventure Film	Inherent Vice	Nominated	
Saturn Award	June 25, 2015	Best Supporting Actor	Josh Brolin	Nominated	
USC Scripter Award	January 31, 2015	Best Adapted Screenplay	Paul Thomas Anderson	Nominated	
