= Lost Soul: The Doomed Journey of Richard Stanley's Island of Dr. Moreau =

Lost Soul: The Doomed Journey of Richard Stanley’s Island of Dr. Moreau
- Directed by: David Gregory
- Written by: David Gregory
- Produced by: Carl Daft; David Gregory
- Starring: Richard Stanley; Fairuza Balk; Rob Morrow; Robert Shaye; Hugh Dickson; Oli Dickson
- Cinematography: Jim Kunz
- Edited by: Douglas Buck
- Music by: Mark Raskin
- Production company: Severin Films
- Release dates: August 24, 2014 (London FrightFest Film Festival); February 27, 2015 (United States)
- Running time: 97 minutes
- Country: United States
- Language: English

Lost Soul: The Doomed Journey of Richard Stanley's Island of Dr. Moreau is a 2014 American documentary film directed by David Gregory. The film had its world premiere at the London FrightFest Film Festival on August 24, 2014, and covers Richard Stanley's experiences while he conceived and developed the project, as well as his time as director for the 1996 film The Island of Dr. Moreau and the aftermath of his departure and the effect it had on the cast, crew, and overall film.

== Synopsis ==
In Lost Soul Gregory looks at the filming of The Island of Dr. Moreau, specifically the period that director Richard Stanley spent on the project. Stanley was brought on to the project early but was fired only a few days after principal photography began and was replaced by John Frankenheimer. The documentary looks into Stanley's vision for the film, as he had spent years working on the movie's script and had intended for Bruce Willis to star as Edward Douglas, a role that was later given to David Thewlis. Lost Soul features interviews with several people involved with the movie's production and focuses on various aspects of the film, including numerous changes to the script and the difficulties the cast and crew members had to deal with on the set.

== Cast ==
- Fairuza Balk
- Hugh Dickson
- Oli Dickson
- Peter Elliott
- Bruce Fuller
- Michael Gingold
- David Grasso Jr.
- Marco Hofschneider
- David Hudson
- Graham Humphreys
- Kier-La Janisse
- Paul Katte
- Fiona Mahl
- Rob Morrow
- Emile Nicolaou
- Edward R. Pressman
- James Sbardellati
- Robert Shaye
- Richard Stanley
- Tim Sullivan
- David Thewlis
- Val Kilmer

== Reception ==
Critical reception for Lost Soul has been positive and the film has received praise from Nerdly and Shock Till You Drop, with the latter describing it as a "must see". IGN rated Lost Soul favorably and summed it up as "a no-holds-barred making of documentary that proves that fact really is stranger than fiction". Filmink called it "superb."

== Release ==
The film premiered as part of the London FrightFest Film Festival on 24 August 2014. The film screened at the IFI's Horrorthon 2014 in Dublin, Ireland. In the United States it premiered in a limited screening in February 2015, with a start in Austin, Texas on 25 February and end on 30 March in Scottsdale, Arizona. It was also part of Phoenix International Horror & Sci-Fi Film Festival and screened on 30 March the same year in the Harkins Scottsdale 101 Theatre in Arizona.
