= Scarlett Amaris =

American screenwriter

Scarlett Amaris is an American-born screenwriter and author known for her work in the horror genre, including the film H.P. Lovecraft's Color Out of Space (2019), for which she was a finalist for the Bram Stoker Award for Superior Achievement in a Screenplay. She has also authored dark fiction novels and contributed essays on the occult and witchcraft.

A music video director, she has taught courses on mythology and witchcraft and has been a featured speaker at international conferences, including the Magickal Women Conference in London.

== Screenwriting career ==
Amaris began her screenwriting career with the horror anthology The Theatre Bizarre (2011), co-writing and serving as Second AD on the segment "Mother of Toads". She went on to co-write the award-winning documentary L'Autre Monde (The Otherworld) (2013) and the science fiction horror film Replace (2017).

Her highest-profile credit is H.P. Lovecraft's Color Out of Space (2019), directed by Richard Stanley and starring Nicolas Cage. The fifth version of Lovecraft's cosmic horror/body horror tale, which Amaris co-wrote with director Stanley version, updated and set in contemporary Arkham, became a cult horror hit, winning Best Horror Film at Fantastic Fest, Best Feature and Audience Choice at the H.P. Lovecraft Film Festival, the Creative Coalition's Spotlight Initiative Award at the Toronto International Film Festival, and the Fangoria Chainsaw Awards for Best Limited Release Film.

== Directing ==
Amaris directed the music video for "Nail Me Down" by artist Scarlett Seraphim (2024), shot by cinematographer Elle Schneider. The video screened at the Austin Spotlight Film Festival, the Bogota Music Video Festival, and the Canberra Short Film Festival. In 2025, it won Best Video Clip at the Etreum Horror Film Festival and was selected as a finalist at the Etheria Film Festival.

== Author ==
Amaris is co-author of the folk-horror series Saurimonde. She has contributed essays to several publications, including three pieces for The Heretic Magazine (2015–2016): "Through a Kaleidoscope Darkly: The Enigmatic Life and Work of Irene Hillel-Erlanger", "On the Trail of the Tetramorph", and "Gloraie to the End of the World: The Apocalyptic Paintings of Juan Valdes Leal". She also contributed "The Mythology Behind the Popular Dark Fantasy Series Saurimonde" to the anthology "Folk Horror Revival: Field Studies" (2015). She was an inaugural contributor to Making Magic Happen: Selected Essays from the Inaugural Magickal Women Conference 2019 with an essay on Una Woodruff's witches.

In 2026, The Crooked Path Imprint launched with two books of practical devotions dedicated to Hekate, Hekatean Witches Almanac 2027 and The Hekatean Witches Book of Shadows 2027, both co-written by Amaris with Popi Mavros. Amaris also created the historically accurate coloring book The Witch's Familiar.

== Lectures ==
Amaris has been a featured speaker at several international events, including the Magickal Women Conference in London (2019), the Making Magical Fiction Forum in London (2021), and Edgeways in London (2024, 2025, 2026).

== Personal life and legal proceedings ==
From 2009 to 2014, Amaris was in a relationship with cult horror director Richard Stanley, with whom she collaborated on several film projects, including L'Autre Monde (2013) and Color Out of Space (2019).

In March 2021, Amaris accused Stanley of domestic abuse in a blog post, and stated that she filed a report with French police in October 2014. On 25 October 2021, entertainment news outlet Deadline reported Stanley had filed criminal complaints against Amaris for libel, harassment and loss of income.

Amaris appeared in the 2024 documentary Shadowland, directed by Otso Tiainen, which chronicles the community surrounding Stanley in Montségur, France. According to Variety, Amaris' blog caused a pivot in the documentary's direction, reframing Stanley in light of accusations of abuse by multiple women interviewed in the documentary and which Variety writes "were covered in depth in an article by the Daily Beast in January 2023". The film premiered at Beyond Fest and screened at the Imagine Filmfestival Amsterdam.
