= Shadowland (film) =

2024 Finnish documentary film

- Directed by: Otso Tiainen
- Produced by: Kalle Kinnunen
- Cinematography: Peter Flinckenberg, Max Smeds
- Edited by: Mikko Sippola, Jussi Heikkinen
- Music by: Timo Kaukolampi
- Production company: Bufo
- Release date: 2024
- Country: Finland
- Languages: English; French; Russian
- Budget: €390,000

Shadowland is a 2024 Finnish documentary film about an esoteric community in the French Pyrenees, directed by Otso Tiainen.

== Development ==
The film is Otso Tiainen's debut as director. It is executive produced by Sam Lake, the creative director at video game developer Remedy, and produced by Finland's Bufo, also the producers of Aki Kaurismäki's Fallen Leaves.

The documentary was originally planned to be about filmmaker and occultist Richard Stanley and other members of an esoteric community, called "The Zone" (in direct reference to the Tarkovsky film Stalker), in the French Occitania. The region attracts people who seek supernatural encounters and hope to find the Holy Grail.

During filming, an allegation of past domestic abuse was made by Scarlett Amaris against Stanley. Further allegations led the documentarists to follow a new direction for the film.

Director Tiainen stated in an official statement: "We filmmakers started this journey planning to make an elevated documentary with genre film aspirations. The film was supposed to show how an imagined world can mend a broken soul. Soon everything turned upside down. Instead of portraying an artist's rise, fall and glorious rise again, we ended up following his friends and admirers getting lost in a web of manipulation."

Most of Shadowland was filmed in the village of Rennes-les-Bains, its neighboring hamlets such as Rennes-le-Château, and Montségur. These esoteric and occult hubs were also in headlines during later production years due to the Alex Batty case. Due to the local spiritual groups gaining notoriety, these very small communes were described in major newspapers as "a magnet for conspiracy theorists and alternative-lifestyle followers, looking to get off the grid, away from the demands of capitalist modernity" and "a haven for cults and hippies". According to the BBC, people living near the esoteric communities’ cult-like milieu "are concerned that many ending up in the seclusion in the mountains rapidly become brainwashed and divorced from their families - and reality".

== Release ==
Shadowland premiered at Beyond Fest, Los Angeles, in October 2024. Since then it has been selected for, among others, Imagine Film Festival in the Netherlands, Calgary Underground Film Festival in Canada, and Night Visions Film Festival in Finland.

Shadowland was selected for the main competition at the 2025 Krakow Film Festival, where it was nominated for the main prize, the Golden Horn. It was nominated for the Best Nordic Documentary prize, the highest accolade at the Nordisk Panorama Film Festival, in September 2025.

It has been selected for the Documentaries Competition at the 43rd Torino Film Festival.

== Reception ==
On review aggregator website Rotten Tomatoes, the film holds an approval rating of 100% based on 10 reviews. In his positive review, Andrew Mack at Screen Anarchy described Shadowland as a "cinematographically beautiful, but subject-disturbing whiplash of a documentary, with a very controversial Stanley at the centre".

Cineuropa's Olivia Popp observed, "It is simultaneously a unique portrait of a region full of engrossing magical tradition and a biting look at Stanley through his own words".

"The dream obviously turns into a nightmare, and Tiainen seeks the same kinds of atmospheres as in the grief-stricken Midsommar by Ari Aster", remarked Corriere della Sera's critic Paolo Baldini.

"The exciting story has been magnificently photographed by Peter Flinckenberg and Max Smeds. The landscape provides a perfect sinister background to a story suitable for Cthulhu meeting the Elder Gods, a land where Neanderthals roamed", wrote critic, author and film historian Antti Alanen.

Sound designer Svante Colérus won the Best Sound Design for his work on Shadowland at the 2025 Jussi Awards, the most prestigious film awards in Finland.
