= Dust Devil (film) =

1992 horror film by Richard Stanley

- Theatrical release poster by Graham Humphreys
- Directed by: Richard Stanley
- Written by: Richard Stanley
- Produced by: JoAnne Sellar
- Starring: Robert Burke; Chelsea Field; Zakes Mokae; John Matshikiza
- Cinematography: Steven Chivers
- Edited by: Derek Trigg; Paul Carlin
- Music by: Simon Boswell
- Production companies: Palace Pictures; Film Four International
- Distributed by: PolyGram Video
- Release date: 1992
- Running time: 108 minutes
- Country: United Kingdom

Dust Devil is a 1992 British horror film written and directed by Richard Stanley. The film stars Robert Burke as Hitch, a mysterious man who wanders the deserts in Namibia and is wanted by the police in connection with the death of a woman whose blood was used in a supernatural ceremony. It is believed by a local sangoma that Hitch is a "Dust Devil", a supernatural creature that can change its form. Hitch encounters Wendy, played by Chelsea Field, who drives with him along a highway as she is pursued by her estranged husband. As police begin investigating the murders, they seem to trace back to Hitch and Wendy discovers the man has supernatural powers.

Dust Devil was shot in Namibia after March 1990, when Stanley presented his script to producer JoAnne Sellar, whom he had previously worked with on his first film Hardware (1990). Sellar was able to secure 2.8 million pounds for Dust Devil. The script was then sent to the Ministry of Information and Broadcasting in Namibia for approval. Sellar was also able to use South African personnel and equipment for the production, making the film's crew a combination of British, American, South African and Namibian people.

After finishing filming, Dust Devil experienced a difficult post-production, with several different cuts being released in the United Kingdom, the United States and select areas in Europe, where the film was released in a much shorter version titled Demonica. In 1993, the film was released in United Kingdom following the demise of Palace Pictures under an end credit of Dust Devil: The Final Cut. It was released in the United States by Miramax with a shorter running time than the British version.

== Plot ==
In Namibia at the end of its War of Independence, a Sangoma named Joe Niemand recites a story about Dust Devils—anthropomorphised desert winds that roam the highways to hunt and kill humans.

One Dust Devil kills a woman who had picked him up for sex, then burns her house and leaves her corpse in the car. Meanwhile, in the town of Bethanie, Sgt. Ben Mukurob receives a phone call with strange voices speaking, as does Wendy Robinson in Johannesburg, South Africa. In the morning, the man burns down Saarke's house and leaves in her car. In Johannesburg, Wendy's husband Mark accuses her of cheating on him, leading her to leave him and drive to Namibia. Investigating the scene, Sgt Ben Mukurob and Captain Beyman find strange pictographs on the wall. Joe tells him that they are magic symbols, but Mukurob is skeptical. The Dust Devil is picked up by Wendy, a woman who had left her husband after he accused her of infidelity. When he sees another of his kind hitch-hiking, Dust Devil tells Wendy to drive past him, then disappears from the car. Meanwhile, two police officers find human remains in a camper near where Wendy picked up Dust Devil.

With Dust Devil secretly watching, Wendy stops at a small motel for the night and tries to commit suicide but stops herself. Wendy goes to her car the next morning and finds Dust Devil inside, who tells her that she fell asleep the day before. Meanwhile, Beyman gives Mukurob documents about similar murders dating back to 1908. Wendy and Dust Devil reach the Fish River Canyon, as Wendy's husband Mark arrives in Namibia and begins his search for her. Joe tells Mukurob that the murders are the work of the "naghtloper", a shape-shifting demon who gains power over the material world through ritual murder. The naghtloper must keep moving to work the ritual, but if he is tricked into stepping over a kierie stick, he will be bound to one spot, and his power can be taken. Joe gives Mukurob a kierie and a sacred root to burn to prevent the naghtloper from possessing him after it is killed.

When Wendy discovers human fingers among Dust Devil's belongings, he tries to kill her, but she escapes. Mukurob and Mark pursue them, but Dust Devil causes them to crash the car in a dust storm. Mukurob leaves Mark at the car and heads into the storm, telling him that he has a chance since the naghtloper only takes those who have nothing to live for. He finds Wendy reaches the abandoned town of Kolmanskop but is stabbed by Dust Devil. Mukurob blocks Dust Devil's path with the kierie, and Wendy uses Mukurob's shotgun to kill Dust Devil as he proclaims his love for her. Wendy walks into the desert past Mark and the car, lies on the road, and pulls over a fleet of army Casspirs. Joe believes she has been possessed by the Dust Devil.

== Cast ==
- John Matshikiza as Joe Niemand / The Narrator
- Robert John Burke as Dust Devil
- Terri Norton as Saarke Haarhoff
- Chelsea Field as Wendy Robinson
- Rufus Swart as Mark Robinson
- William Hootkins as Captain Cornelius Beyman
- Zakes Mokae as Sergeant Ben Mukurob
- Russell Copley as Corporal Dutoit
- Andre Odendaal as Corporal Botes
- Luke Cornell as Soldier 1
- Philip Henn as Soldier 2
- Robert Stevenson as Rifle Boy
- Peter Hallr as Marist Monk
- Stephen Earnhart as Camper Driver
- Marianne Sägebrecht as Dr. Leidzinger

== Production ==
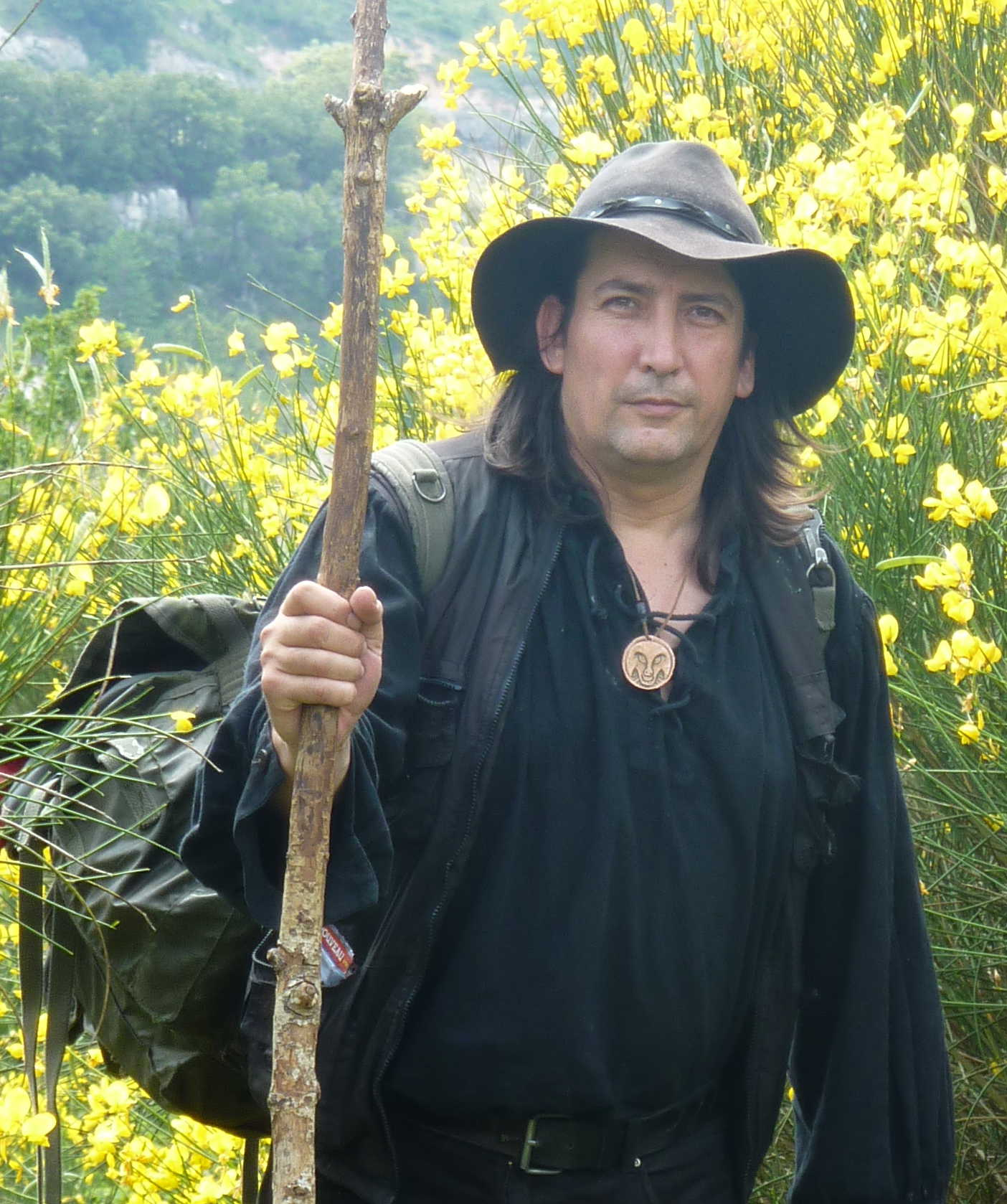
Richard Stanley (pictured) had trouble releasing a proper edit of his film to distributors.

Richard Stanley's previous film Hardware was made for £1 million, and grossed over $5.7 million world-wide. Stanley stated that Hardware was made to prove to producers that he could make a commercial film after finding that he was rejected by producers for his first scripts. Dust Devil was shot entirely on location in Namibia and re-interprets the story of a South African serial killer known as Nhadiep. The story of Nhadiep had previously been the inspiration for the British film Windprints (1989) by David Wicht. Dust Devil was made from a previous work of Stanley's, an unfinished 16mm student short film shot in 1984 about bizarre murders taking place around the town of Bethanie. The authorities never caught the serial killer, which led to locals believing the killings were caused by a supernatural force. The police eventually returned to the town with the body of a man they believed was the killer; however, the body was without a head, which made identification with locals impossible. The man was later buried in a town with a grave marked "Nhadiep".

Stanley felt his film was not initially a horror film, but admitted the film had traits of the genre. As well as acknowledging Italian gialli films as an influence, he also felt the film was influenced by Alejandro Jodorowsky's El Topo, Luis Buñuel's Simon of the Desert, Pier Paolo Pasolini's The Gospel According to Saint Matthew, and Sergio Leone's Once Upon a Time in the West. Stanley also described the film as a marriage between Italian gialli films and the spaghetti westerns of Sergio Leone, specifically noting The Good, the Bad and the Ugly declaring that In Leone's film "cynical privateers looked for buried gold against an American Civil War backdrop, My Dust Devil characters weave in and out of similar historical events because I updated the murders to run parallel to Namibia's bloody fight for independence from South Africa in 1989." Stanley also mentioned an influence of Michele Soavi's film The Devil's Daughter, by using "his idea of shimmering Virgin Mary blues to similarly represent forces of God."

Filming in Namibia became possible following the country's independence in March 1990. Stanley presented his script to producer JoAnne Sellar, whom he had previously worked with on Hardware. Sellar was able to secure 2.8 million pounds for Dust Devil. The script was then sent to the Ministry of Information and Broadcasting in Namibia for approval. Sellar was also able to use South African personnel and equipment for the production, making the film's crew a combination of British, American, South African, and Namibian people.

Post-production of Dust Devil began in 1991 in London. Stanley initially had a 120-minute cut of the film, which was tightened to 110 minutes. Stanley hoped the British financiers would find this edit appropriate for release in Europe and the United Kingdom. However, this was not the case; the financiers cut the film to 95 minutes. The 95-minute version was given a test screening in Wimbledon. Stanley stated that the audience was "clearly confused", as many of the cuts had taken out parts of the film's first act. Following this screening, Stanley, who was adamant that the previous cut of the film was superior, pushed for an "extended European cut" of the film, which would run between 110 and 120 minutes. However, further cuts were made, which gave Dust Devil a running time of 87 minutes. In April 1992, Palace Pictures began experiencing financial problems, causing them to pull out of distributing the film in the United Kingdom.

== Release ==
Dust Devil was financed by an amalgamation of British Investors under the Palace Productions umbrella. The film also received some financial backing from Miramax, the distributors of Stanley's previous film Hardware. In December 1991, Stanley delivered his first fine cut, a 120-minute assembly version that was cut to fulfill British television contracts. This version was given to Miramax for their consideration, who returned it as an 85-minute version. In February 1992, Palace, which was on the verge of financial collapse, asked Stanley to accept a cut that was a compromise between the original version and the Miramax edit. Stanley mentioned that "Palace explained it would be financially expedient to arrive at a compromise, but I'd have nothing to do with it. I'd lost footage already, and I wasn't willing to go back in the editing room." Dust Devil was initially set to be released in the United Kingdom in December 1992. A 94-minute cut was test-screened in August 1992 to what Mark Kermode of Shivers magazine described as "a poor reaction." A shortened version that was accepted by Miramax was shown in Spain and Portugal under the title Demonica and was also shown at the Avoriaz Film Festival. Abridged versions were shown in Italy and France under different titles. After Palace lost its money, Stanley persuaded Polygram to have a new version ready, which he personally financed with £15,000. On 7 April 1993, Dust Devil: The Final Cut premiered at the Scala cinema in King's Cross, London, and was shown for one week and grossed £2,836, a few weeks before being released to home video.

An 80-minute cut of the film that was not color-graded was shown in some European territories before 1994, which Richard Stanley described as "an effort to liberate blocked funds and has subsequently been withdrawn with the consent of all parties." Stanley wrote to Shivers magazine published in January 1994 that Miramax was planning to distribute Dust Devil in January 1994, with a home video release of the film later in the year. The American cut of the film released by Miramax removed about 20 minutes of footage.

Stanley recently recorded commentaries and interviews not only for this film, but also for three Voice of the Moon, The Secret Glory, and The White Darkness. In 2006, these documentaries, along with the commentaries, were included as extra features on Subversive Cinema's deluxe limited edition DVD set of Richard Stanley's approved "Final Cut" of Dust Devil, which runs 108 minutes. A 115-minute work print is also included, along with a CD of Simon Boswell's soundtrack music, a liner notes booklet containing Stanley's production diaries, a Dust Devil comic book, and a liner notes booklet written by Stanley about the three documentaries.

== Reception ==
In Sight & Sound, Kim Newman described the film as a "more personal effort than Hardware", and that "for all its lean boogey man strengths, this is mainly a hallucinatory picture: Stanley delivers the requisite shocks with a buff's care and enthusiasm, but is obviously more interested in eerie desert images like a valley said to be created by the slithering of a giant snake at the dawn of time and other unsettling touches." Newman concluded that, on viewing any of the several different edits of the film, Dust Devil was a "considerable and remarkable film." Derek Elley of Variety called it "a brilliant mess", "overflowing with ideas, visual invention and genre references but saddled with a weak, unfocused script."

In his book Horror and Science Fiction Film IV, Donald C. Willis stated that Dust Devil was "handsomely photographed" but also "pretentious" with a "tired" ending. On the review aggregator website Rotten Tomatoes, 50% of 10 critics' reviews are positive.

== Footnotes ==
=== References ===
- Willis, Donald C. (1997). Horror and Science Fiction Films IV. Scarecrow Press. ISBN 0-8108-3055-8.
