= Hardware (film) =

1990 film by Richard Stanley

- Theatrical release poster
- Directed by: Richard Stanley
- Screenplay by: Richard Stanley
- Based on: SHOK! by Steve MacManus; Kevin O'Neill
- Produced by: JoAnne Sellar; Paul Trijbits
- Starring: Dylan McDermott; Stacey Travis; John Lynch; William Hootkins; Iggy Pop
- Cinematography: Steven Chivers
- Edited by: Derek Trigg
- Music by: Simon Boswell
- Production companies: British Satellite Broadcasting; British Screen; Palace Productions; Wicked Films
- Distributed by: Palace Pictures (United Kingdom); Millimeter (United States)
- Release dates: 14 September 1990 (US); 5 October 1990 (UK)
- Running time: 94 minutes
- Countries: United Kingdom; United States
- Language: English
- Budget: £960,000 ($1.5 million)
- Box office: $6.3 million (UK/US)

Hardware is a 1990 science fiction horror film written and directed by Richard Stanley, in his feature directorial debut. It stars Dylan McDermott and Stacey Travis, and also features cameo appearances by musicians Carl McCoy, Iggy Pop and Lemmy. An example of the cyberpunk subgenre, the plot of Hardware follows a self-repairing robot that goes on a rampage in a post-apocalyptic slum.

Fleetway Comics successfully sued the filmmakers of Hardware for plagiarism, due to similarities between the screenplay and a short story titled "SHOK!" that appeared in 1980 in the Judge Dredd Annual 1981, a spin-off publication of the popular British weekly anthology comic 2000 AD, credit was added to later releases of the film. Since its release, Hardware has become a cult film.

== Plot ==
A nomadic scavenger treks through an irradiated wasteland and discovers a buried robot. He collects the pieces and takes them to junk dealer Alvy, who is talking with 'Hard Mo' Baxter, a former soldier, and Mo's friend Shades. When Alvy steps away, Mo buys the robot parts from the nomad and sells all but the head to Alvy. Intrigued by the technology, Alvy begins to research its background. Mo and Shades visit Jill, Mo's reclusive girlfriend, and, after an initially distant welcome where Jill checks them with a Geiger counter, Mo presents the robot head as a Christmas gift. Jill, a metal sculptor, eagerly accepts the head. After Shades leaves, they have loud, passionate sex, while being unknowingly watched by their foul-mouthed, perverted, voyeuristic neighbour Lincoln Weinberg via telescope.

Later, Mo and Jill argue about a government sterilization plan and the morality of having children. Jill works the robot head into a sculpture, and Mo says that he likes the work, but he does not understand what it represents. Frustrated, Jill says it represents nothing and resents Mo's suggestion that she make more commercial art to sell.

The next morning Mo receives a call from Alvy, who urges Mo to return to the shop, as he has important news about the robot, which he says is a M.A.R.K. 13. Before he leaves, Mo checks his Bible, where he finds the phrase "No flesh shall be spared" under Mark 13:20, and he becomes suspicious that the robot is part of a government plot for human genocide to address the planet's severe overpopulation crisis. Mo finds Alvy dead of a cytotoxin and evidence that the robot is an experimental combat model capable of self-repair; Alvy's notes also indicate a defect, a weakness to humidity. Worried, Mo contacts Shades and asks him to check on Jill, but Shades is in the middle of a drug trip and barely coherent.

Back at the apartment, the robot has reassembled itself using pieces of Jill's metal sculptures and recharged by draining her apartment's power network. It attempts to kill Jill, but she traps it in a room after the apartment's doors lock. Lincoln sees the robot close the blinds while trying to peep on Jill, and, after he briefly manages to open the apartment door, makes crude sexual advances towards her, and offers to override the emergency lock that traps them in her apartment. Lincoln dismisses her warnings of a killer robot, and, when he attempts to open Jill's blinds so that he can more easily peep on her, the M.A.R.K. 13 brutally kills him. Jill flees into her kitchen, where she reasons that her refrigerator will hide her from the robot's infrared vision. She damages the robot before Mo, Shades, and the apartment's security team arrive and open fire on it, apparently destroying it.

As Jill and Mo embrace, the M.A.R.K. 13 drags her out a window, and she crashes into her neighbor's apartment. Jill races back upstairs to help Mo, who is alone with the M.A.R.K. 13. Overconfident, Mo engages the robot in battle, and it injects him with the same toxin that killed Alvy. Mo experiences euphoria and a series of hallucinations as he dies. After Jill re-enters her apartment, the M.A.R.K. 13 sets her apartment doors to rapidly open and close; the security team die when they attempt to enter, and Shades is trapped outside. Jill hacks into the M.A.R.K. 13's CPU and unsuccessfully attempts to communicate with it; however, she discovers the robot's weakness and lures the M.A.R.K. 13 into the bathroom. Shades, who has managed to quickly jump through the doors, gives her time to turn on the shower. The M.A.R.K. 13 short circuits and is finally deactivated. The next morning, a radio broadcast announces that the M.A.R.K. 13 has been approved by the government, and it will be mass manufactured, the nomadic scavenger is seen returning to the irradiated wasteland.

== Cast ==
- Dylan McDermott as Moses "Hard Mo" Baxter
- Stacey Travis as Jill
- John Lynch as Shades
- Iggy Pop as Angry Bob
- Carl McCoy as Nomad / Zone Tripper
- William Hootkins as Lincoln Wineberg, Jr.
- Mark Northover as Alvy
- Paul McKenzie as Vernon
- Lemmy as Water Taxi Driver

== Production ==
The film's script was similar to a short 2000 AD comic strip called "SHOK!" which had been published in 1980. Fleetway Comics brought a successful lawsuit that the film plagiarized the comic strip and so a notice was added to later releases, giving credits to the strip's publisher, Fleetway Publications and creators, Steve MacManus and Kevin O'Neill. Other influences include Soylent Green, Damnation Alley, and the works of Philip K. Dick.

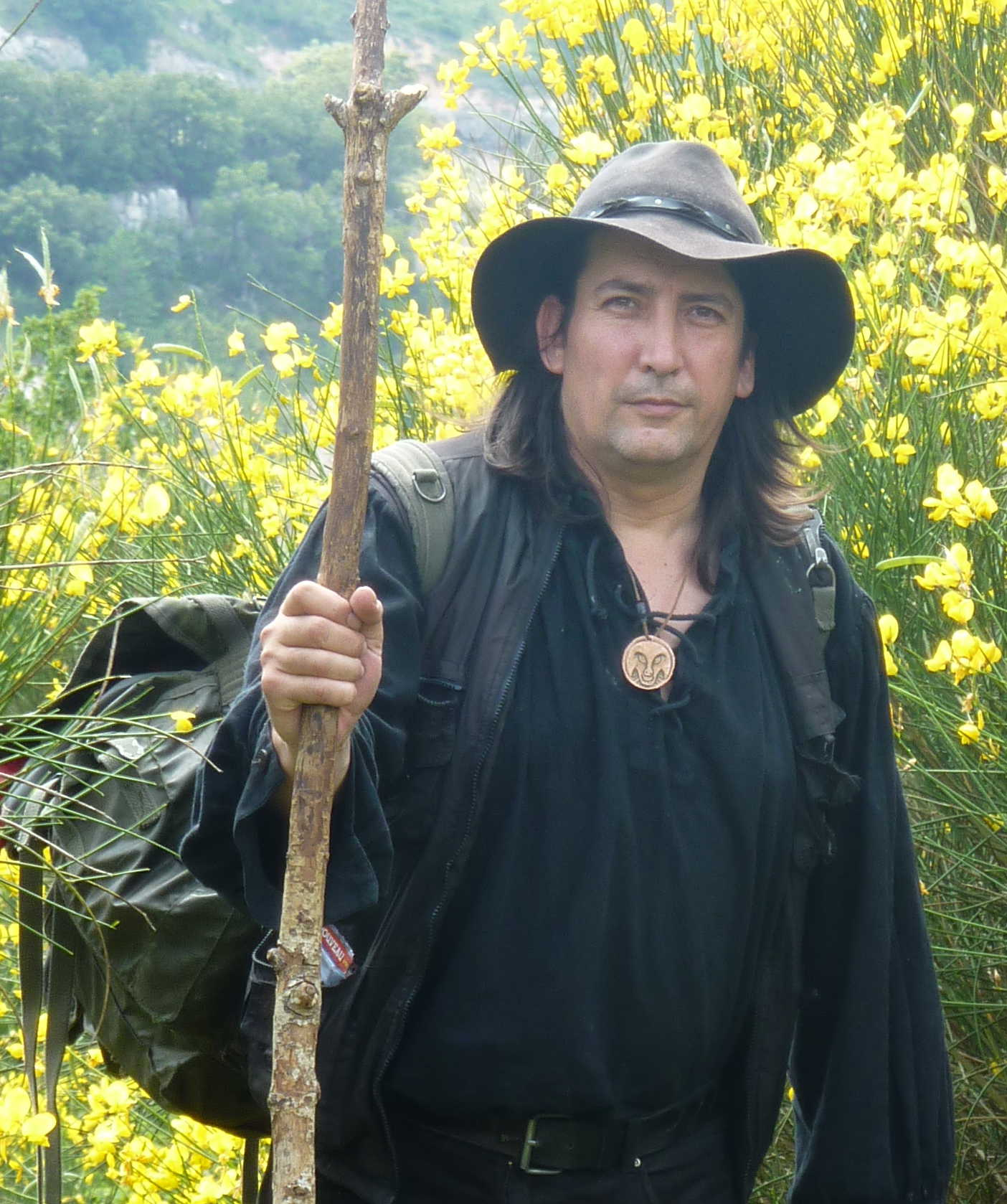
Hardware writer-director Richard Stanley (pictured in 2010)

Writer-director Richard Stanley had previously made a post-apocalyptic short film when he was a teenager, and Hardware grew out of that film and responses he got from other, unproduced scripts. By the late 1980s, Stanley had accompanied a guerrilla Muslim faction in the Soviet–Afghan War in order to shoot a documentary. He started pre-production of Hardware almost immediately after leaving Afghanistan. The opening scene was shot in Morocco, and the rest of the film was shot in London, mostly inside the then-abandoned Roundhouse; sets were built inside the structure, although the lack of proper soundproofing meant all of the dialogue had to be re-recorded. The film was originally more specifically British, but Miramax insisted on American leads. Stanley then added a multinational cast to muddy the setting.

Stanley wanted to emphasize themes of fascism and passive acceptance of authoritarianism, as he had recently come from the apartheid regime of South Africa. Stanley says that the robot does not know that it is committing evil, and it only obeys its programming, which could be likened to a spiritual quest. Psychic TV was an inspiration for the exaggerated television broadcasts.

== Music ==
Simon Boswell composed and performed the film's score, which is primarily electronic. The film also features the songs "Ace of Spades" by Motörhead, "Stigmata" by Ministry, and "The Order of Death" by Public Image Ltd.

Author K. J. Donnelly perceived an influence of MTV and music videos on the film, writing, "Hardware stands as an example of a particular type of film that melds the form of the pop video with the format of the cinematic feature." Donnelly notes that Stanley had directed music videos prior to Hardware, including videos for the bands Fields of the Nephilim—whose frontman Carl McCoy appears in the film as the nomadic "zonetripper"—and Public Image Ltd. Donnelly highlights the appearances by McCoy as the zonetripper, Iggy Pop as radio announcer Angry Bob, and Motörhead vocalist Lemmy as a water taxi driver as "establishing a significant esoteric level in the film"; he also notes the meta-referential nature of the film's inclusion of "Ace of Spades", as Lemmy's character plays the song on his water taxi's radio cassette.

== Release ==
Hardware was originally rated "X" by the Motion Picture Association of America (MPAA) for its gore. It was later cut down to an R to avoid the stigma of a rating associated with pornography.

=== Box office ===
In the UK the film grossed £313,038.

In the United States, the film debuted at number six. It grossed $2,381,285 in its opening weekend from 695 cinemas and ended with a total gross of $5,728,953.

== Home media ==
Due to its unexpected success, the film was caught up in continual legal issues that prevented its release on DVD for many years.

Hardware was released on Region 2 DVD and Blu-ray on 22 June 2009. It was released on region-free DVD and Blu-ray on 13 October 2009 by Severin Films.

Umbrella Entertainment released a HDR 4k remastered version of the uncut and uncensored R on 5 March 2025.

== Reception ==
On the review aggregator website Rotten Tomatoes, the film has an approval rating of 46% based on 13 reviews, with an average rating of 5.7/10.

Upon release, Hardware received mixed reviews from critics, who cited it as derivative of Alien and The Terminator. Owen Gleiberman of Entertainment Weekly gave the film a grade of "D+", lamenting it as unoriginal, "as if someone had remade Alien with the monster played by a rusty erector set." Variety wrote, "A cacophonic, nightmarish variation on the postapocalyptic cautionary genre, Hardware has the makings of a punk cult film." Michael Wilmington of the Los Angeles Times characterized Hardware as a shallow splatter film whose exaggerated bleakness elevates it above the typical techno-thriller, concluding: "Insane exaggerations and all, this barbarous hell of wanton destruction and bleak post-industrial Darwinism is what may face us. That nasty notion pulls Hardware up above all but a fraction of its competition in the techno-thriller blood-bath sweeps." Vincent Canby of The New York Times described it as a future midnight movie and wrote, "Watching Hardware is like being trapped inside a video game that talks dirty." Richard Harrington of The Washington Post called it "an MTV movie, a mad rush of hyperkinetic style and futuristic imagery with little concern for plot (much less substance)."

Despite mixed reviews during original release, Hardware has gone on to be considered a cult film. Ian Berriman of SFX wrote, "It's one of those lovingly crafted movies where ingenuity and enthusiasm overcome the budgetary limitations." Matt Serafini of Dread Central gave it a score of four out of five stars and wrote, "Hardware isn't quite the masterpiece that some its most ardent fans have claimed, but it's an excellent piece of low-budget filmmaking from an era when low-budget wasn't synonymous with camcorder crap." Bloody Disgusting called it "an austere and trippy film" with a narrative that is "a disjointed mess", but noted that it "has become a certifiable cult classic". Todd Brown of Twitch Film called it "essentially a lower budget, more intentionally punk take on The Terminator" that has an "undeniable ... sense of style". DVD Verdict's Daryl Loomis called it slow-paced but stylistic and atmospheric, and fellow reviewer Gordon Sullivan called it "a hallucinatory and violent film" that has an overly detailed, slow-paced beginning. Writing for DVD Talk, Kurt Dahlke awarded it three out of five stars and called it a "forgotten gem" that "is overwhelmed by style and gore", and Brian Orndorf called it "an art-house, sci-fi gorefest" that is moody and atmospheric without buckling under its own weight. Michael Gingold of Fangoria gave it three out of four stars and wrote, "If the ingredients of Hardware are familiar, Stanley cooks them to a boil with a relentless pace and imagery that makes his future a tactile place".

== Bibliography ==
- Short, Sue (2002). "'No Flesh Shall Be Spared': Richard Stanley's Hardware". In Hunter, I. Q. (ed.). British Science Fiction Cinema. Routledge. ISBN 9781134702770.
- Donnelly, K. J. (2003). "Constructing the Future Through Music of the Past: The Software in Hardware". In Inglis, Ian (ed.). Popular Music and Film. Wallflower Press. ISBN 9781903364727.
