= Shashi Warrier =

Indian author

Shashi Warrier is an Indian author who wrote Hangman's Journal. He was born in Kerala and has an MSc(Hons.) in Economics from BITS Pilani. His father was in the Indian armed forces and Warrier spent his childhood in different parts of the country. He is also an avid biker and has travelled around India on his Royal Enfield Thunderbird. Shashi is married to writer (Circle of Fate) Prita Warrier. They live in Mangalore.

== Filmography ==
He was the co-writer of the 2002 Indian English film Bokshu – The Myth directed by Shyamaprasad.
