= The Island of Dr. Moreau (1996 film) =

American science fiction film by John Frankenheimer

- Theatrical release poster
- Directed by: John Frankenheimer
- Screenplay by: Richard Stanley; Ron Hutchinson
- Based on: The Island of Doctor Moreau by H. G. Wells
- Produced by: Edward R. Pressman
- Starring: Marlon Brando; Val Kilmer; David Thewlis; Fairuza Balk
- Cinematography: William A. Fraker
- Edited by: Paul Rubell
- Music by: Gary Chang
- Production company: Edward R. Pressman Productions
- Distributed by: New Line Cinema
- Release dates: August 23, 1996 (United States); November 15, 1996 (United Kingdom)
- Running time: 96 minutes
- Country: United States
- Language: English
- Budget: $40 million
- Box office: $49.6 million

The Island of Dr. Moreau is a 1996 American science fiction horror film, based on the 1896 novel The Island of Doctor Moreau by H. G. Wells. It was directed by John Frankenheimer (who was brought in half a week after shooting started) and stars Marlon Brando, Val Kilmer, David Thewlis, and Fairuza Balk. The screenplay is credited to the original director Richard Stanley and Ron Hutchinson. It is the third major film adaptation of the Wells novel, following Island of Lost Souls (1932) and The Island of Dr. Moreau (1977).

The production was notoriously difficult, marred by issues with the cast, harsh weather and a skyrocketing budget. Bruce Willis was originally hired to play Edward Prendick, but allegedly dropped out as he started divorce proceedings from Demi Moore. Willis was replaced by Kilmer, who made his availability limited, and later had anger issues with most of the cast after also being served divorce papers on set. Then Rob Morrow quit because of script rewrites.

Brando's role as Moreau was supposed to be expanded, but following his daughter's suicide, Brando retreated to his private island, leaving production in limbo, not knowing when or even if he would show up. Brando also did not want to learn his lines, so he requested them through an earpiece and/or improvised his dialogue. Original director Richard Stanley was dismissed by New Line Cinema after problems arose during production, including a major hurricane, with Frankenheimer being brought in to replace him. The film received generally negative reviews and was considered a box office bomb.

In 2014, the documentary Lost Soul: The Doomed Journey of Richard Stanley's Island of Dr. Moreau was released, covering Stanley's experiences while he conceived and developed the project, his time as director, and the aftermath of his departure and the effect it had on the cast, crew, and overall film. Kilmer also shared some behind-the-scenes footage of the film in the 2021 documentary Val where he shared his side of events.

== Plot ==
United Nations negotiator Edward Douglas survives a plane crash in the Java Sea. A passing boat rescues him. Aboard, Dr. Montgomery tends to him and promises that Douglas will be taken to Timor. However, when they arrive at Montgomery's destination, "Moreau's Island", he instead advises Douglas to disembark and use the radio there.

Douglas and Montgomery go to the Main House, where the former is warned not to wander. According to Montgomery, Moreau fled the United States due to backlash against his experimentation on animals. Douglas is locked in his room by Montgomery, but escapes that night. While exploring, he hears cries and enters a laboratory where he witnesses a human-llama hybrid give birth, with doctors attending to the delivery.

Douglas's presence is noticed by a doctor, who turns out to be a human-animal hybrid, and he flees, finding Aissa, a daughter of Moreau's, who leads him to the 'village' of the mutants. There, Moreau is worshipped by the mutants. He keeps the hybrids subjugated by using a remote-controlled electrical implant, surgically placed at birth under their skin.

Moreau tells Douglas how he introduced human DNA into animals in search of a higher being, incapable of harm. The existing Beast-Folk are imperfect, but Moreau claims to be close to a "solution". When Moreau discovers that the leopard-human hybrid Lo-Mai has killed a rabbit, he promises that there will be a "trial" the next day. Douglas tries to escape by boat, but stops as it is overrun with humanoid rats.

At the outdoor trial, Lo-Mai runs at Moreau but is stopped by the remote-controlled implant. To Moreau's shock, Azazello shoots Lo-Mai dead. His body is cremated publicly. Inspecting the charred remains, the "Hyena-Swine" hybrid notices the control implant embedded in Lo-Mai's arm. He then feels for the same implant on his own body and removes it from the bone. Hyena later starts saying "no more pain", wanting to spread the word to all the mutants. In addition to the pain caused by the implant, the animals are controlled through regular drugging to prevent them from "retrogressing". Hyena-Swine reveals his removed implant to Montgomery who sets the other beasts after him. Meanwhile, Douglas tries to contact the outside world, but Montgomery sabotages the radio.

Hyena-Swine and his trackers, now on his side and also free of implants—confront Moreau. Enraged, Hyena-Swine reveals his intent to overthrow him and destroy all humanity. The group eventually kills Moreau. Douglas then fires a gunshot, scaring the group off. Azazello steals Montgomery's handgun and joins Hyena-Swine's faction. Douglas realizes that Aissa is regressing; her pupils are cat-like, her canine teeth are becoming fangs, and her fingernails are becoming sharper. Douglas can stop this with a serum from the lab. But Montgomery has gone insane and destroyed it. Moreau was planning to use Douglas's DNA to stop Aissa's regression permanently, completing his experiments.

Azazello leads the mutants to the armory. They eventually take over the island, keeping hostages. Montgomery has lost his mind and is promoting hedonism amongst the mutants. Drunk, he sits in Moreau's former throne and is killed by Azazello well watching a mutant orgy. Hyena-Swine's group continues to rampage around the island. Azazello hangs Aissa out of jealousy before being executed by Hyena-Swine, being viewed as a threat to his dominance. Douglas survives by telling Hyena-Swine to impose his leadership and be "God Number One" among the others of his faction, causing Hyena-Swine to kill his supporters. Eventually, M'Ling, another one of Moreau's sons, triggers an explosion that causes Hyena-Swine to lose his gun and allows Douglas to escape. Outnumbered and defenseless, Hyena-Swine retreats into the burning building and dies.

Peaceful-minded hybrids see off Douglas, who leaves on a raft. The hybrids now want to return to their natural state of being and are in favor of ending Moreau's work.

== Cast ==
- Marlon Brando as Dr. Moreau, a mad scientist who created the Beast-Folk in an attempt to forge the "perfect" species.
- Val Kilmer as Dr. Montgomery, a former neurosurgeon who is a vet, security enforcer, and pharmacist on Dr. Moreau's island.
- David Thewlis as Edward Douglas, a United Nations agent who gets stranded in the middle of the Indian Ocean and comes to the island.
- Fairuza Balk as Aissa, a cat-human hybrid and Moreau's daughter who has been receiving regular experimental feline hormonal treatments, but still looks more human than the other animal-human hybrids.
- Daniel Rigney as Hyena-Swine, a vicious hyena-pig-human tribrid.
- Temuera Morrison as Azazello, a dog-human hybrid and Moreau's "son", who is also a surgeon and assigned to find the hybrids.
- Nelson de la Rosa as Majai, a homunculus of Dr. Moreau who does not speak and was created from a fusion of pig DNA and human DNA.
- Peter Elliott as Assassimon, a baboon-human hybrid who is the only primate hybrid and Five Finger Man.
  - Frank Welker provided the uncredited voice of Assassimon.
- Mark Dacascos as Lo-Mai, a leopard-human hybrid who is accused of breaking the laws (drinking water from a stream, walking on all fours and eating flesh).
- Ron Perlman as the Sayer of the Law, a blind goat-human hybrid who is the priest figure among the hybrids.
- Marco Hofschneider as M'Ling, another dog/human hybrid and "child" of Moreau.
- Miguel López as Waggdi, an unspecified hybrid "child" of Moreau.
- Neil Young as Boar Man, an unnamed boar-human hybrid
- David Hudson as Bison Man, an unnamed bison-human hybrid
- Clare Grant as Fox Lady, an unnamed fox/human hybrid
- Kitty Silver and Fiona Mahl as the Sow Ladies, two unnamed pig-human hybrids
- William Hootkins as Kimil
- Richard Stanley as a Bulldog Man (uncredited)

Peter Cullen provided the trailer narration for this film.

== Production ==
=== Casting ===
As recounted in David Gregory's documentary Lost Soul: The Doomed Journey of Richard Stanley's Island of Dr. Moreau (2014), the chaotic events of the making of the film quickly led to its becoming one of the most difficult and troubled productions in Hollywood history.

A film version of Dr. Moreau had been a long-standing dream of original director Richard Stanley, who had first read the book as a child. He spent four years developing the project before getting the green-light from New Line Cinema. Although Stanley had envisaged Jürgen Prochnow in the lead role, New Line managed to secure Marlon Brando, but some time later, Stanley learned that New Line had gone behind his back and offered the movie to director Roman Polanski.

Furious, Stanley demanded a meeting with Brando who, unexpectedly, proved very sympathetic to Stanley's vision, not least because of Stanley's intimate understanding of the novel and its history - including its connections with Joseph Conrad's Heart of Darkness (the main inspiration for Francis Ford Coppola's Apocalypse Now) - and because of Stanley's family relation to legendary African explorer Sir Henry Morton Stanley, one of the chief inspirations for Conrad's lead character, Kurtz. According to Stanley, Brando still was fascinated by Kurtz more than 15 years after he had played a version of the character in Coppola's film.

With Brando supporting him, Stanley was confirmed as director, and he was able to recruit two more major stars: Bruce Willis as Edward Prendick, a U.N. negotiator who washes up on Moreau's island after his plane crashes, and James Woods as Montgomery, Moreau's chief assistant. Buoyed by these developments, Stanley enthusiastically launched into pre-production, collaborating with special effects creator Stan Winston on the creation of makeup and costumes for Moreau's hybrid creatures and preparing the location and sets. As the time for principal photography approached, however, problems began to multiply: Willis withdrew from the film (Stanley says in Lost Soul that Willis was divorcing his wife Demi Moore at the time, but the couple did not announce their separation until the summer of 1998, with the divorce made final two years later).

He was replaced with Val Kilmer, who, to Stanley's dismay, demanded a 40% reduction in the number of days he was required on set. Stanley solved this problem when he had the idea to switch Kilmer from the protagonist to the supporting role of Montgomery, who had far less screen time. However, this meant Woods had to leave the production. New Line hurriedly recruited former Northern Exposure star Rob Morrow for the lead role. Another significant setback occurred before filming began when Brando's daughter Cheyenne took her life. The devastated star retreated to his private island, leaving Stanley and his producers in limbo, not knowing when or if he would show up.

=== Shooting ===
==== Stanley as director ====
The chosen location for the film was the rain forest outside Cairns in North Queensland, Australia, including Bramston Beach, Queensland, Mossman Gorge, etc. Tensions between Stanley and New Line had been growing during pre-production, partly because of Stanley's quirky, insular nature, and his marked unwillingness to attend studio meetings, but they reached crisis point within the first few days of filming. Stanley's vulnerability to studio pressure was exacerbated by the continuing absence of his main ally, Brando, but the biggest problem proved to be the notorious on-set behaviour of Kilmer, who reportedly arrived two days late.

Kilmer later attributed his obnoxious behaviour to the fact that, just as filming began, he learned from a television report that he was being sued for divorce by his wife of seven years, Joanne Whalley. Whatever his reasons, many of the cast and crew have testified to Kilmer's bullying and his consistently hostile and obstructive manner during the first days of shooting. He would not deliver the dialogue as scripted and repeatedly criticized Stanley's ideas; what little footage was shot was deemed unusable.

The studio mainly seems to have blamed the director for not getting Kilmer under control, but another significant factor was the sudden departure of co-star Rob Morrow on the second day of shooting. With the location being pounded by bad weather that had temporarily stopped filming, Morrow found himself unable to bear the tension and hostility on set any longer, so he telephoned New Line chairman Rob Shaye in Hollywood and tearfully begged to be let go. Shaye agreed.

After a third day of filming, following emergency consultations with its on-set executives, New Line abruptly fired Stanley by fax. The beleaguered director reacted angrily, shredding documents in revenge and then vanishing after being delivered to the airport for the return flight to Hollywood. The reasons for Stanley's dismissal were not made clear and false rumours were spread about his allegedly erratic behaviour, but the main reasons appear to have been his perceived unwillingness to deal with studio executives and especially his problems in dealing with Kilmer, whose already well-established reputation for being "difficult" was soon to be enshrined in movie lore thanks to this film.

Stanley had been offered his full fee on condition that he leave the production quietly and not speak about his firing, so his disappearance caused consternation at New Line, who feared he might try to sabotage the filming. His removal also predictably sent shock waves through the cast and crew. Outraged female lead Fairuza Balk stormed off the set after a heated exchange with New Line executives and then had a production assistant drive her all the way from Cairns to Sydney - a distance of some 2,500 km - in a rented limousine. By her own account however, Balk's agent then warned her in blunt terms that the studio would ruin her and that she would never work in films again if she broke her contract, so she was soon forced to return to the set.

==== Frankenheimer as director ====
With a potential disaster looming, New Line brought in veteran director John Frankenheimer. He came on board in part because - like virtually every member of the cast and crew - he wanted the opportunity to work with the legendary Brando, but he also used the studio's desperation to his advantage, successfully demanding a hefty fee and a three-picture deal in exchange for his services. Well known as one of the last of the "old style" Hollywood directors, Frankenheimer's gruff, dictatorial approach was radically different from Stanley's and he soon alienated many of the cast and crew. Brando agreed to his decision to have the then-current script by Stanley, Michael Herr and Walon Green rewritten by Frankenheimer's previous collaborator Ron Hutchinson. Frankenheimer also needed to find a new lead actor to replace Rob Morrow and brought in David Thewlis to play Douglas. The whole production was shut down for a week and a half while these changes were implemented.

Once shooting resumed, the problems continued and escalated. Brando routinely spent hours in his air-conditioned trailer when he was supposed to be on camera, while actors and extras sweltered in the tropical heat in full make-up and heavy costumes. The antipathy between Brando and Kilmer rapidly escalated into open hostility and on one occasion, as recounted in Lost Soul, this resulted in the cast and crew being kept waiting for hours, with each actor refusing to come out of his respective trailer before the other. New script pages were turned in only a few days before they were shot. Frankenheimer and Kilmer had an argument on-set, which reportedly got so heated, Frankenheimer stated afterwards, "I don't like Val Kilmer, I don't like his work ethic, and I don't want to be associated with him ever again".

According to Thewlis, "we all had different ideas of where it should go. I even ended up improvising some of the main scenes with Marlon". Thewlis went on to rewrite his character personally. The constant rewrites also got on Brando's nerves and, as on many previous productions, he refused to learn lines, so he was equipped with a small radio receiver, so that his assistant could feed his lines to him as he performed - a technique he had used on earlier films.

Thewlis recollected that Brando would "be in the middle of a scene and suddenly he'd be picking up police messages and would repeat, 'There's a robbery at Woolworths'". Meanwhile, friction between him and Kilmer elicited the former's quip: "Your problem is you confuse the size of your paycheck with the size of your talent". Upon completion of Kilmer's final scene, Frankenheimer is reported to have said to the crew, "Now get that bastard off my set". Kilmer denied having a feud with Brando. He shared some behind-the-scenes footage of friendly moments he had with Brando as well as his complaining to Thewlis about Frankenheimer in the documentary Val. In his memoir I'm Your Huckleberry, Kilmer said "John Frankenheimer went on to blame me publicly for ruining the movie. I always thought it an odd thing to try to do, blame me for his failure to make an entertaining film, because my character dies halfway through, and the last half of the film sucks as bad as the first". Screenwriter Ron Hutchinson said "everybody behaved monstrously to each other" and Brando had "poisonous" relations with most actors. Brando also wanted to change the script to add his own plot points and decided not wanting his character to die.

Stanley had reportedly jokingly told the film's production designer to burn the set down, but when Stanley disappeared after being fired, security was tightened in case he was trying to sabotage the project. Stanley later revealed that he had stayed in Australia; suffering an emotional breakdown, he had retreated to a remote area in the Cairns region to recover. There, he had a chance meeting with some of the film's former production staff, who had been rehired as extras and were camping in the area. It was confirmed by these same production staff in the Lost Soul documentary that with their help Stanley secretly came back to the set over several days, disguised in full costume as one of the dog-men, and performed as an extra on the film he originally had been hired to direct. It has been reported that he showed up at the film's wrap party, where he ran into Kilmer, who was said to have apologized profusely for Stanley's removal from the film.

== Director's cut ==
A director's cut was released on Blu-ray on July 24, 2012, and on DVD on April 4, 2017, extending the 96-minute film to 100 minutes.

== Reception ==
The film was met with negative reviews; Rotten Tomatoes currently rates the film with a 22% "Rotten", based on 36 reviews with the consensus: "Timid and unfocused in its storytelling, The Island of Dr. Moreau is more lackluster misfire than morbid curiosity". Audiences surveyed by CinemaScore gave the film a grade of "C−" on a scale of A+ to F. The film grossed only $49 million worldwide on a $40 million budget, which, with marketing and other expenses, lost money for the studio. In an article written upon Brando's death in 2004, critic Roger Ebert described The Island of Dr. Moreau as "perhaps [Brando's] worst film". Filmink argued the movie "has its pleasures, not the least of which includes the performances of Kilmer, Brando and Fairuza Balk. There are, however, mortal flaws, such as killing off Kilmer's and Brando's characters far too early, and the miscast David Thewlis in the lead."

The Island of Dr. Moreau later received six nominations for the Razzie Awards including Worst Picture and Worst Director, winning Worst Supporting Actor for Marlon Brando (Val Kilmer was also a nominee in this category). At the 1996 Stinkers Bad Movie Awards, Brando was nominated for Worst On-Screen Hairstyle (which he lost to Stephen Baldwin for Bio-Dome) and won Worst Supporting Actor. The film also got nominations for two Saturn Awards: Best Science Fiction Film and Best Make-up.

Mike Myers has acknowledged that the character of Mini-Me, a miniature version of the villain Dr. Evil in the Austin Powers films, was directly inspired by the character of Majai in this film.

The character of Dr. Alphonse Mephesto and his adopted son Kevin from South Park are homages to Marlon Brando's Dr Moreau and Nelson de la Rosa's Majai.
