= Firehouse (1987 film) =

1987 film

- DVD cover
- Directed by: J. Christian Ingvordsen
- Written by: J. Christian Ingvordsen; Steven Kaman; Rick Marx
- Produced by: C. Steven Duncker; J. Christian Ingvordsen; Steven Kaman
- Starring: Gianna Ranaudo; Gideon Fountain; Peter Mackenzie
- Cinematography: Steven Kaman
- Edited by: Steven Kaman
- Music by: Michael Montes
- Production company: Cinema Sciences Corporation
- Release date: 1987
- Running time: 91 minutes
- Country: United States
- Language: English

Firehouse is a 1987 film directed and co-written by J. Christian Ingvordsen. It marked Julia Roberts' film debut.

== Plot ==
An evil businessman is secretly setting fires to some of the old buildings of a dilapidated neighborhood, while at the same time three women become the new recruits at a local fire station. Life is not smooth at the new firehouse, as the women are teased and harassed by their male coworkers. But they learn to stand up for themselves against the torment while also solving the mystery of who is starting the fires.

== Principal cast ==
Actor	Role
Gianna Palminteri (as Gianna Rains, born Gianna Ranaudo)	Barrett Hopkins
Martha Peterson	Shannon Murphy
Renee Raiford	Violet Brown
Peter Onorati	Ron J. Sleek
Gideon Fountain	John Anderson
Peter Mackenzie	Dickson Willoughby
Craig Mitchell	Bummy
Julia Roberts (uncredited)	Babs

== Production ==
Filming locations included Volunteer Engine & Hose 1, 155 Morgan Street, Jersey City, New Jersey (later owned and used as offices for her Flavor Unit production company by Queen Latifah).

== Release ==
In 1989, the film was broadcast on Cinemax.
