= As Good as It Gets =

1997 film by James L. Brooks

- Theatrical release poster
- Directed by: James L. Brooks
- Screenplay by: Mark Andrus; James L. Brooks
- Story by: Mark Andrus
- Produced by: James L. Brooks; Bridget Johnson; Kristi Zea
- Starring: Jack Nicholson; Helen Hunt; Greg Kinnear; Cuba Gooding Jr.; Skeet Ulrich; Shirley Knight
- Cinematography: John Bailey
- Edited by: Richard Marks
- Music by: Hans Zimmer
- Production companies: TriStar Pictures; Gracie Films
- Distributed by: Sony Pictures Releasing
- Release dates: December 6, 1997 (Regency Village Theatre); December 25, 1997 (United States)
- Running time: 138 minutes
- Country: United States
- Language: English
- Budget: $50 million
- Box office: $314.1 million

As Good as It Gets is a 1997 American romantic comedy film directed by James L. Brooks from a screenplay he co-wrote with Mark Andrus. It stars Jack Nicholson as a misanthropic, bigoted and obsessive–compulsive novelist, Helen Hunt as a single mother with a chronically ill son, and Greg Kinnear as a gay artist. The film was produced by TriStar Pictures and Gracie Films and distributed by Sony Pictures Releasing.

As Good as It Gets premiered at the Regency Village Theatre on December 6, 1997, and was released theatrically in the United States on Christmas Day. A critical and box office hit, it grossed $314.1 million on a $50 million budget. At the 70th Academy Awards, the film was nominated in seven categories, including Best Picture. Nicholson won for Best Actor and Hunt for Best Actress, making it the most recent film to win both lead acting awards. It is ranked 140th on Empire magazine's "The 500 Greatest Movies of All Time" list.

== Plot ==
Misanthropic NYC best-selling romance novelist Melvin Udall has OCD. He uses soap bars only once to wash his hands, touches public restroom faucets and door handles with paper towels, avoids stepping on sidewalk cracks, has rituals with switches and locks, sticks to rigid routines, and always eats breakfast at the same table in the same restaurant while bringing his own plastic flatware. Carol Connelly is the only server at the restaurant who tolerates his rude and compulsive behavior.

Melvin's apartment neighbor, gay artist Simon Bishop, starts working with a new model, Vincent Lopiano. Vincent uses the opportunity to case Simon's apartment and give entry to his friends, who assault and nearly kill Simon during a robbery. Simon's agent, Frank Sachs, intimidates Melvin into caring for Simon's pet dog Verdell, a Griffon Bruxellois, while Simon is hospitalized. Although Melvin initially does not enjoy caring for the dog, he becomes emotionally attached to it. When Simon is released from the hospital, Melvin tolerates a neighborly relationship with Simon so he can continue to see Verdell.

Melvin was asked by his publisher’s receptionist how did he understand women so well. Melvin replied: “I looked at men and took away reason and accountability.”

Melvin's compulsive need for routine and aversion to change is aggravated when Carol decides to work closer to home in Brooklyn to be more accessible for her acutely asthmatic son, Spencer. Unable to adjust to a different waitress, Melvin arranges to pay for Spencer's considerable medical expenses for at-home care―if Carol returns to the restaurant. While Carol is overwhelmed by Melvin's generosity, thanking him profusely, she is suspicious of his motives, declaring emphatically that she will never have sex with him. Melvin is humiliated; he later admonishes her that she, not he, has made the situation personal.

Meanwhile, Simon's injuries, lack of medical insurance, and high medical bills cause him to go bankrupt and fall into depression. Frank persuades him to go to Baltimore to ask his estranged parents for money. Pushed by Frank, Melvin reluctantly agrees to take a recuperating Simon to Baltimore. Frank lends Melvin his Saab 900 convertible for the trip. Irrationally fearing Simon may make a pass at him (his cover story), Melvin invites Carol along on the trip, reminding her that she owes him a favor, so she reluctantly accepts. Relationships develop among the three on the trip as Simon discusses the root of his estrangement with his parents, who cannot accept his homosexuality; Carol commiserates; and Melvin's acerbic remarks gradually become more sympathetic.

Once in Baltimore, Carol persuades Melvin to take her out for dinner. His conversation during the dinner initially flatters her—he tells her that her "no-sex oath" made him start taking medication to become a better man. When Carol presses Melvin to admit that he invited her on the trip because he has feelings for her, an embarrassed and fumbling Melvin again clumsily deflects. He awkwardly responds that he invited her along to maybe have sex with Simon to cure his homosexuality. Upset at the implication that her sexual favors are for sale, Carol abruptly leaves. She goes to Simon’s hotel room for consolation, and their emotional intimacy rekindles his creative desire to paint. He sketches Carol, nearly nude, making her feel her femininity appreciated in a nonsexual way. With confidence inspired by Carol, Simon briefly reconnects with his mother, without asking her for money, telling her that he will be fine.

After returning to New York, Carol tells Melvin she does not want him in her life anymore because he disparages her. Since Simon is still broke and his apartment has been sublet, Melvin arranges for Simon to stay in his spare bedroom. On learning of Melvin's enormous gesture and sign of growth, Carol regrets her harshness and phones Melvin to apologize. The relationship between Melvin and Carol remains complicated until Simon persuades insomniac Melvin to declare his love for her. At 4 am, Melvin goes to see Carol, who hesitantly agrees to try establishing a relationship with him. She is encouraged by her mother, who declares that no relationship is perfect. As Melvin opens the door for Carol at the bakery, he realizes that he has stepped on a pavement crack to no apparent unease. They walk into the shop conversing as a couple.

== Cast ==
- Jack Nicholson as Melvin Udall
- Helen Hunt as Carol Connelly
- Greg Kinnear as Simon Bishop
- Cuba Gooding Jr. as Frank Sachs
- Skeet Ulrich as Vincent Lopiano
- Shirley Knight as Beverly Connelly
- Yeardley Smith as Jackie Simpson
- Lupe Ontiveros as Nora Manning
- Jill as Verdell
- Bibi Osterwald as neighbor woman
- Brian Doyle-Murray as handyman
- Missi Pyle as Cafe 24 waitress
- Leslie Stefanson as Cafe 24 waitress
- Shane Black as Brian, Cafe 24 manager
- Randall Batinkoff as Carol's date
- Lisa Edelstein as woman at table
- Peter Jacobson as man at table
- Jesse James as Spencer "Spence" Connelly
- Jamie Kennedy as street hustler
- Justin Herwick as street hustler
- Maya Rudolph as policewoman
- Lawrence Kasdan as Dr. Green
- Wood Harris as Cafe 24 busboy
- Julie Benz as receptionist
- Harold Ramis as Dr. Martin Bettes
- Danielle Spencer as veterinarian
- Todd Solondz as man on bus
- Tom McGowan as maître d'hôtel

== Production ==
In 1996, James L. Brooks flew Geoffrey Rush from Sydney to Los Angeles to audition for the part of Simon Bishop, and offered him the role, but Rush declined it. Betty White was offered a role in the film but she declined, due to a scene in the film where a dog is thrown into a trash chute. Tony Shalhoub vied for the role of Simon Bishop, which eventually went to Greg Kinnear.

Owen Wilson served as associate producer, one of his first jobs in Hollywood.

This film proved immensely difficult for even such a well-seasoned actor as Jack Nicholson. He had portrayed numerous iconic roles by this time like Colonel Nathan Jessep in A Few Good Men (1992), The Joker in Batman (1989), Randle P. McMurphy in One Flew Over the Cuckoo's Nest (1975), and Jack Torrance in The Shining (1980). Nicholson even offered James L. Brooks, the writer and director of the film, the opportunity to replace his role, because he was struggling to find the character.

Because of this, Jack Nicholson and Brooks clashed on set regarding Nicholson's performance of Melvin, leading to a production halt for the two to find the correct tone for the character.

The paintings were created for the film by New York City artist Billy Sullivan.

== Soundtrack ==
As Good as It Gets

Soundtrack album by Hans Zimmer and various artists
- Released: January 13, 1998
- Studios: Sony Pictures Studios, Culver City, California; Media Ventures, Santa Monica, California
- Genre: Compilation
- Length: 54:23
- Label: Columbia
- Producers: Adam Smalley, Hans Zimmer

- The soundtrack features instrumental pieces composed by Hans Zimmer. Zimmer's work was nominated for the Academy Award for Best Original Score – Musical or Comedy, but lost to The Full Monty.

The soundtrack also features various licensed songs. Those are, in order of appearance:

- Temple (Sanctuary Mix) by Jane Siberry
- An American in Paris by George Gershwin
- Hand On My Heart by Judith Owen
- Spanish Castle magic by Spin Doctors
- Climb On (A Back That's Strong) by Shawn Colvin
- YMCA by The Village People
- Days Like This by Van Morrison
- Baltimore by The Drifters
- Everything My Heart Desires by Danielle Brisebois
- My Only by Danielle Brisebois
- For Sentimental Reasons (I Love You) by Nat 'King' Cole
- Always Look on the Bright Side of Life by Art Garfunkel

In addition to this, Hans Zimmer's score features some original songs with the film's leads as performers.

== Reception ==
=== Box office ===
As Good as It Gets was a box office hit, opening at number three at the box office (behind Titanic and Tomorrow Never Dies) with $12.6 million, and eventually earning over $148 million domestically and $314 million worldwide. It is Jack Nicholson's second-highest-earning film, behind Batman.

=== Critical reception ===
Review aggregator Rotten Tomatoes reports that 86% of professional critics gave the film a positive review based on 84 reviews. The consensus states that "James L. Brooks and Jack Nicholson, doing what they do best, combine smart dialogue and flawless acting to squeeze fresh entertainment value out of the romantic-comedy genre." Metacritic gave the film a score of 67 out of 100, based on reviews from 30 critics, indicating generally favorable reviews. Audiences polled by CinemaScore gave the film an average grade of "A-" on an A+ to F scale.

Chicago Reader film critic Jonathan Rosenbaum wrote that what director James L. Brooks "manages to do with [the characters] as they struggle mightily to connect with one another is funny, painful, beautiful, and basically truthful—a triumph for everyone involved."

Praise for the film was not uniform among critics. While Roger Ebert gave the film three stars (out of four), he called the film a "compromise, a film that forces a smile onto material that doesn't wear one easily," writing that the film drew "back to story formulas," but had good dialogue and performances. The Washington Post critic Desson Howe gave a generally negative review of the film, writing that it "gets bogged down in sentimentality, while its wheels spin futilely in life-solving overdrive."

== Accolades ==
Award	Category	Nominee(s)	Result	Ref.
Academy Awards	Best Picture	James L. Brooks, Bridget Johnson, and Kristi Zea	Nominated	
Academy Awards	Best Actor	Jack Nicholson	Won	
Academy Awards	Best Actress	Helen Hunt	Won	
Academy Awards	Best Supporting Actor	Greg Kinnear	Nominated	
Academy Awards	Best Original Screenplay	Mark Andrus and James L. Brooks	Nominated	
Academy Awards	Best Film Editing	Richard Marks	Nominated	
Academy Awards	Best Original Score	Hans Zimmer	Nominated	
ALMA Awards	Outstanding Actress in a Feature Film	Lupe Ontiveros	Nominated	
American Cinema Editors Awards	Best Edited Feature Film	Richard Marks	Nominated	
American Comedy Awards	Funniest Actor in a Motion Picture (Leading Role)	Jack Nicholson	Won	
American Comedy Awards	Funniest Actress in a Motion Picture (Leading Role)	Helen Hunt	Won	
Artios Awards	Best Casting for Feature Film – Comedy	Francine Maisler	Nominated	
Blockbuster Entertainment Awards	Favorite Actor – Video	Jack Nicholson	Nominated	
Blockbuster Entertainment Awards	Favorite Actress – Video	Helen Hunt	Won	
BMI Film & TV Awards	BMI Film Music Award	Hans Zimmer	Won	
Chicago Film Critics Association Awards	Best Film		Nominated	
Chicago Film Critics Association Awards	Best Director	James L. Brooks	Nominated	
Chicago Film Critics Association Awards	Best Actor	Jack Nicholson	Nominated	
Chicago Film Critics Association Awards	Best Actress	Helen Hunt	Nominated	
Chicago Film Critics Association Awards	Best Supporting Actor	Greg Kinnear	Nominated	
Chicago Film Critics Association Awards	Best Original Screenplay	Mark Andrus and James L. Brooks	Nominated	
Chlotrudis Awards	Best Actress	Helen Hunt	Nominated	
Critics' Choice Awards	Best Picture		Nominated	
Critics' Choice Awards	Best Actor	Jack Nicholson	Won	
Czech Lion Awards	Best Foreign Language Film	James L. Brooks	Nominated	
Dallas–Fort Worth Film Critics Association Awards	Best Film		Nominated	
Directors Guild of America Awards	Outstanding Directorial Achievement in Motion Pictures	James L. Brooks	Nominated	
Empire Awards	Best Actress	Helen Hunt	Nominated	
Florida Film Critics Circle Awards	Best Actress	Helen Hunt	Won	
GLAAD Media Awards	Outstanding Film – Wide Release		Nominated	
Golden Globe Awards	Best Motion Picture – Musical or Comedy		Won	
Golden Globe Awards	Best Actor – Musical or Comedy	Jack Nicholson	Won	
Golden Globe Awards	Best Actress – Musical or Comedy	Helen Hunt	Won	
Golden Globe Awards	Best Supporting Actor – Motion Picture	Greg Kinnear	Nominated	
Golden Globe Awards	Best Director	James L. Brooks	Nominated	
Golden Globe Awards	Best Screenplay	Mark Andrus and James L. Brooks	Nominated	
Golden Reel Awards	Best Sound Editing – Music (Domestic and Foreign)	Zigmund Gron	Nominated	
Golden Screen Awards			Won	
Japan Academy Film Prize	Outstanding Foreign Language Film		Nominated	
Jupiter Awards	Best International Actor	Jack Nicholson	Won	
London Film Critics Circle Awards	Actor of the Year	Jack Nicholson	Won	
Los Angeles Film Critics Association Awards	Best Actor	Jack Nicholson	Runner-up	
Los Angeles Film Critics Association Awards	Best Actress	Helen Hunt	Nominated	
MTV Movie Awards	Best Female Performance	Helen Hunt	Nominated	
National Board of Review Awards	Top Ten Films		2nd Place	
National Board of Review Awards	Best Actor	Jack Nicholson	Won	
National Board of Review Awards	Best Supporting Actor	Greg Kinnear	Won	
Online Film & Television Association Awards	Best Picture	James L. Brooks, Bridget Johnson, and Kristi Zea	Nominated	
Online Film & Television Association Awards	Best Comedy/Musical Picture	James L. Brooks, Bridget Johnson, and Kristi Zea	Won	
Online Film & Television Association Awards	Best Director	James L. Brooks	Nominated	
Online Film & Television Association Awards	Best Actor	Jack Nicholson	Won	
Online Film & Television Association Awards	Best Comedy/Musical Actor	Jack Nicholson	Won	
Online Film & Television Association Awards	Best Actress	Helen Hunt	Nominated	
Online Film & Television Association Awards	Best Comedy/Musical Actress	Helen Hunt	Won	
Online Film & Television Association Awards	Best Supporting Actor	Greg Kinnear	Nominated	
Online Film & Television Association Awards	Best Screenplay – Written Directly for the Screen	Mark Andrus and James L. Brooks	Nominated	
Online Film & Television Association Awards	Best Music – Original Comedy/Musical Score	Hans Zimmer	Won	
Online Film & Television Association Awards	Best Ensemble		Nominated	
Online Film Critics Society Awards	Best Actor	Jack Nicholson	Won	
Producers Guild of America Awards	Outstanding Producer of Theatrical Motion Pictures	James L. Brooks, Bridget Johnson, and Kristi Zea	Nominated	
San Diego Film Critics Society Awards	Best Actor	Jack Nicholson	Won	
San Diego Film Critics Society Awards	Best Screenplay – Original	Mark Andrus and James L. Brooks	Won	
Satellite Awards	Best Motion Picture		Won	
Satellite Awards	Best Actor in a Motion Picture	Jack Nicholson	Won	
Satellite Awards	Best Actress in a Motion Picture	Helen Hunt	Won	
Satellite Awards	Best Supporting Actor	Cuba Gooding Jr.	Nominated	
Satellite Awards	Best Supporting Actor	Greg Kinnear	Nominated	
Satellite Awards	Best Supporting Actress	Shirley Knight	Nominated	
Screen Actors Guild Awards	Outstanding Performance by a Male Actor in a Leading Role	Jack Nicholson	Won	
Screen Actors Guild Awards	Outstanding Performance by a Female Actor in a Leading Role	Helen Hunt	Won	
Screen Actors Guild Awards	Outstanding Performance by a Male Actor in a Supporting Role	Greg Kinnear	Nominated	
SESC Film Festival	Best Foreign Actor	Jack Nicholson	Won	
Society of Texas Film Critics Awards	Best Screenplay – Original	Mark Andrus and James L. Brooks	Nominated	
Southeastern Film Critics Association Awards	Best Picture		3rd Place	
Southeastern Film Critics Association Awards	Best Actor	Jack Nicholson	Runner-up	
Southeastern Film Critics Association Awards	Best Supporting Actor	Greg Kinnear	Won	
Southeastern Film Critics Association Awards	Best Original Screenplay	Mark Andrus and James L. Brooks	Won	
Toronto Film Critics Association Awards	Best Actor	Jack Nicholson	Runner-up	
Turkish Film Critics Association Awards	Best Foreign Film		13th Place	
Writers Guild of America Awards	Best Screenplay – Written Directly for the Screen	Mark Andrus and James L. Brooks	Won	
YoungStar Awards	Best Performance by a Young Actor in a Comedy Film	Jesse James	Won	

== Home media ==
The film was released on VHS, LaserDisc and DVD on May 19, 1998 by Columbia TriStar Home Video. It was released on Blu-ray in the United States on June 12, 2012, as part of Twilight Time's Screen Archives collection. The set was limited to 3,000 units and sold out quickly.

Sony Pictures released the film on 4K UHD Blu-ray on October 25, 2022, as part of its Columbia Classics 4K Ultra HD Collection Volume 3, along with It Happened One Night, From Here To Eternity, To Sir, With Love, The Last Picture Show and Annie.

Awards
Preceded by The Silence of the Lambs	Academy Award winner for Best Actor and Best Actress	Succeeded by No film has achieved this since
