= Ulee's Gold =

- Theatrical release poster
- Directed by: Victor Nuñez
- Written by: Victor Nuñez
- Produced by: Jonathan Demme
- Starring: Peter Fonda; Patricia Richardson; Jessica Biel; J. Kenneth Campbell; Christine Dunford; Steven Flynn; Dewey Weber; Tom Wood; Vanessa Zima
- Cinematography: Virgil Mirano
- Edited by: Victor Nuñez
- Music by: Charles Engstrom
- Production companies: Motion Picture Corporation of America; Clinica Estetico; Nunez-Gowan
- Distributed by: Orion Pictures
- Release date: June 13, 1997
- Running time: 115 minutes
- Country: United States
- Language: English
- Budget: $2.7 million
- Box office: $9,054,736 (U.S.)

Ulee's Gold is a 1997 American drama film written and directed by Victor Nuñez and starring Peter Fonda. Co-stars include Patricia Richardson, Christine Dunford, Tom Wood, Jessica Biel, J. Kenneth Campbell and Vanessa Zima. It was released by Orion Pictures, with Jonathan Demme receiving presenter credits for his role in the film's financing.

The film's title refers both to the honey the main character Ulee produces as a beekeeper, particularly that made from the nectar of the tupelo tree, and to the hidden money stolen by his son. The "Gold" refers to Ulee's family who means everything to him. Ulee wants nothing to do with the stashed and stolen money.

The film was the "Centerpiece Premiere" at the 1997 Sundance Film Festival. Fonda won a Golden Globe Award for his performance and was also nominated for an Academy Award for Best Actor and a Screen Actors Guild Award.

Van Morrison sings "Tupelo Honey" (the title song of his 1971 album) over the end credits.

== Plot ==
Ulee Jackson is a widowed beekeeper in Wewahitchka, Florida. His son Jimmy is in prison following a botched bank robbery and Jimmy's wife, Helen, has abandoned their two daughters and is living in Orlando. Ulee's stubborn independence prevents him from asking for help, and he has his hands full running his business and acting as surrogate parent to Casey and Penny. Casey is a rebellious teenager and Penny is a timid 10-year-old who seems confused by her parents' absence and the tension at home.

When Ulee visits Jimmy in prison, Jimmy tells him that Helen has turned up at the Orlando home of petty criminals Eddie Flowers and Ferris Dooley. They were Jimmy's accomplices in the robbery, but were never caught. Now they say Helen is sick, and Jimmy asks Ulee to bring her home.

Ulee goes to pick up Helen, but it turns out what Eddie and Ferris really want is the stolen money that Jimmy allegedly hid after the robbery. Ulee agrees to ask Jimmy about it, and then takes Helen home. Helen's "illness" is actually drug addiction and, while she is almost comatose on the way home, she becomes violent and belligerent as she wakes up near the house. Ulee's tenant and next door neighbor, a divorced nurse named Connie, is brought into the home by a frightened Penny, and over the next few days helps Helen through her drug withdrawal.

Meanwhile, Ulee learns that Jimmy hid the bank money in a cooler under a pick-up truck cab in one of Ulee's bee yards. He tells Eddie and Ferris he will bring the money to Orlando in a few days, but they decide they cannot wait and take Helen, Casey, and Penny hostage in Ulee's home. They are then taped up to chairs and left in the dark house as Eddie and Ferris force Ulee at gunpoint to take them to the money. As they leave the house in Ulee's truck, Ulee, uncharacteristically, makes the tires squeal. The unusual sound is enough to get the attention of Connie, who walks over to the house, finds the bound women and releases them. Most likely, she also calls sheriff Bill Floyd to alert him to Eddie and Ferris' actions. After the money has been retrieved, Ulee has an opportunity to grab Eddie's pistol, but kicks it into the swamp. The two criminals ride with Ulee back into town, then Eddie, angry about the lost gun, stabs him in the parking lot when they arrive. As Ulee stumbles away bleeding, Eddie and Ferris drive off but are pulled over almost immediately by Bill.

In a newly hopeful Jackson household, Helen has stepped back into her role as a mother, and Jimmy expects to be paroled soon. Ulee is happy to return to his bees, but has mixed feelings about giving up some of his responsibilities, as Jimmy has asked to work with Ulee. As he recovers from his wound he begins work on expanding his business to accommodate Jimmy's return, and seems to finally be taking a romantic interest in Connie.

== Cast ==
- Peter Fonda as Ulee Jackson
- Patricia Richardson as Connie Hope
- Christine Dunford as Helen Jackson
- Tom Wood as Jimmy Jackson
- Jessica Biel as Casey Jackson
- Vanessa Zima as Penny Jackson
- Steven Flynn as Eddie Flowers
- Dewey Weber as Ferris Dooley
- J. Kenneth Campbell as Sheriff Bill Floyd
- Traber Burns as Chance Barrow
- Ryan Marshall as Charley Myers

== Production ==
Nuñez used the Lanier family, a third-generation beekeeping family in Wewahitchka, Florida as "bee consultants" for the film; the Lanier family swamp lands and bee yards served as filming locations, with some members of the family appearing as extras in the film. Other filming locations were Orlando, Carrabelle, Apalachicola and Port St. Joe in Florida. Ulee's Gold was filmed during the late summer/early autumn of 1996.

During a 1997 interview held in Melbourne, Fonda commented on the character he portrayed:

Ulee is the best character I've ever read. It's the kind of role you pay money to do — a complex character full of possibilities and the script was full of moments that were very deep, very pure and very simple. I also found a lot of Ulee in my father. He kept a couple of hives and I can see him hop-footing it across the lawn, thinking he had a bee up his pant leg. As I began to develop Ulee, I used a lot of the way my father was to us as kids, the way he was to us as a family and the way he was to himself.

The film would help revive Fonda's career.

== Reception ==
Ulee's Gold was well received by critics. On the review aggregator website Rotten Tomatoes, it has an approval rating of 94% based on reviews from 51 critics, with an average rating of 8.1/10. The website's consensus reads, "Led by an outstanding Peter Fonda performance, Ulee's Gold movingly depicts a family in crisis -- and a patriarch willing to sacrifice for the good of others." On Metacritic, it has a score of 77 out of 100 based on reviews from 23 critics, indicating "generally favorable reviews". Audiences polled by CinemaScore gave the film a grade "B+" on scale of A to F.

Andrew Johnston wrote in Time Out New York: "The plot poses ample opportunities for cliches, all of which Nunez deftly avoids. The characters are wonderfully drawn and bring out the best in the actors —the taciturn Fonda often seems to be channeling his father, and Richardson proves she's too talented to be wasting her time on Home Improvement". Variety's Todd McCarthy described the film as a "gem of rare emotional depth and integrity". Roger Ebert of the Chicago Sun-Times gave it 3.5 out of 4, and wrote: "Peter Fonda here reveals a depth of talent we did not suspect."

== Accolades ==
Award	Category	Nominee(s)	Result	Ref.
Academy Awards	Best Actor	Peter Fonda	Nominated	
ALMA Awards	Outstanding Latino Director of a Feature Film	Victor Nuñez	Nominated	
Chicago Film Critics Association Awards	Best Actor	Peter Fonda	Nominated	
Dallas–Fort Worth Film Critics Association Awards	Best Actor	Peter Fonda	Nominated	
Deauville American Film Festival	Grand Prix	Victor Nuñez	Nominated	
Deauville American Film Festival	Jury Prize	Victor Nuñez	Won (Note: Tied with Neil LaBute for In the Company of Men.)	
Fantasporto	Audience Award	Victor Nuñez	Won	
Golden Globe Awards	Best Actor in a Motion Picture – Drama	Peter Fonda	Won	
Independent Spirit Awards	Best Feature		Nominated	
Independent Spirit Awards	Best Director	Victor Nuñez	Nominated	
Independent Spirit Awards	Best Male Lead	Peter Fonda	Nominated	
Independent Spirit Awards	Best Supporting Female	Patricia Richardson	Nominated	
Independent Spirit Awards	Best Screenplay	Victor Nuñez	Nominated	
Mar del Plata International Film Festival	Best Film (International Competition)	Victor Nuñez	Nominated	
MystFest	Best Film	Victor Nuñez	Nominated	
National Society of Film Critics Awards	Best Actor	Peter Fonda	2nd Place	
New York Film Critics Circle Awards	Best Actor	Peter Fonda	Won	
Online Film & Television Association Awards	Best Actor	Peter Fonda	Nominated	
Online Film & Television Association Awards	Best Drama Actor	Peter Fonda	Won	
Online Film Critics Society Awards	Best Actor	Peter Fonda	Nominated	
Screen Actors Guild Awards	Outstanding Performance by a Male Actor in a Leading Role	Peter Fonda	Nominated	
Society of Texas Film Critics Awards	Best Actor	Peter Fonda	Nominated	
Southeastern Film Critics Association Awards	Best Actor	Peter Fonda	Won	
Young Artist Awards	Best Performance in a Feature Film – Supporting Young Actress	Jessica Biel	Won	
Young Artist Awards	Best Performance in a Feature Film – Supporting Young Actress	Vanessa Zima	Nominated	
