= 1997 National Society of Film Critics Awards =

Annual US film awards ceremony

32nd National Society of Film Critics Awards

January 3, 1998

Best Picture:
L.A. Confidential

The 32nd National Society of Film Critics Awards, given on 3 January 1998, honored the best filmmaking of 1997.

== Winners ==
=== Best Picture ===
1. L.A. Confidential
2. The Sweet Hereafter
3. Boogie Nights

=== Best Director ===
1. Curtis Hanson – L.A. Confidential
2. Atom Egoyan – The Sweet Hereafter
3. Paul Thomas Anderson – Boogie Nights

=== Best Actor ===
1. Robert Duvall – The Apostle
2. Peter Fonda – Ulee's Gold
3. Dustin Hoffman – Wag the Dog
3. Ian Holm – The Sweet Hereafter
3. Al Pacino – Donnie Brasco

=== Best Actress ===
1. Julie Christie – Afterglow
2. Helena Bonham Carter – The Wings of the Dove
3. Judi Dench – Mrs. Brown

=== Best Supporting Actor ===
1. Burt Reynolds – Boogie Nights
2. Kevin Spacey – L.A. Confidential
3. Rupert Everett – My Best Friend's Wedding

=== Best Supporting Actress ===
1. Julianne Moore – Boogie Nights
2. Sarah Polley – The Sweet Hereafter
3. Nathalie Richard – Irma Vep

=== Best Screenplay ===
1. Curtis Hanson and Brian Helgeland – L.A. Confidential
2. Atom Egoyan – The Sweet Hereafter
3. Kevin Smith – Chasing Amy

=== Best Cinematography ===
1. Roger Deakins – Kundun
2. Dante Spinotti – L.A. Confidential
3. Christopher Doyle – Happy Together

=== Best Foreign Language Film ===
1. La Promesse
2. Underground
3. Gabbeh

=== Best Non-Fiction Film ===
1. Fast, Cheap & Out of Control
2. 4 Little Girls
3. Sick: The Life & Death of Bob Flanagan, Supermasochist

=== Special Citation ===
- Charles Burnett's Nightjohn, a film whose exceptional quality and origin challenge strictures of the movie marketplace.
