= 1997 Los Angeles Film Critics Association Awards =

Annual US film awards ceremony

23rd LAFCA Awards
- Date: December 1997

Highlights
- Best Picture: L.A. Confidential

The 23rd Los Angeles Film Critics Association Awards, honoring the best in film for 1997, were voted on in December 1997.

== Winners ==
- Best Picture:
  - L.A. Confidential
  - Runner-up: The Sweet Hereafter
- Best Director:
  - Curtis Hanson – L.A. Confidential
  - Runner-up: Atom Egoyan – The Sweet Hereafter
- Best Actor:
  - Robert Duvall – The Apostle
  - Runner-up: Jack Nicholson – As Good as It Gets
- Best Actress:
  - Helena Bonham Carter – The Wings of the Dove
  - Runner-up: Jodie Foster – Contact
- Best Supporting Actor:
  - Burt Reynolds – Boogie Nights
  - Runner-up: Kevin Spacey – L.A. Confidential
- Best Supporting Actress:
  - Julianne Moore – Boogie Nights
  - Runner-up: Gloria Stuart – Titanic
- Best Screenplay:
  - Curtis Hanson and Brian Helgeland – L.A. Confidential
  - Runner-up: Kevin Smith – Chasing Amy
- Best Cinematography:
  - Dante Spinotti – L.A. Confidential
  - Runner-up: Paul Sarossy – The Sweet Hereafter
- Best Production Design:
  - Peter Lamont – Titanic
  - Runner-up: Jeannine Oppewall – L.A. Confidential
- Best Music Score:
  - Philip Glass – Kundun
  - Runner-up: James Horner – Titanic
- Best Foreign-Language Film:
  - La Promesse • Belgium/France/Luxembourg
  - Runner-up: Shall We Dance? (Shall we dansu?) • Japan
- Best Non-Fiction Film:
  - Riding the Rails
  - Runner-up: Sick: The Life & Death of Bob Flanagan, Supermasochist
- Best Animation (tie):
  - Hercules
  - The Spirit of Christmas
- The Douglas Edwards Experimental/Independent Film/Video Award:
  - Finished
- New Generation Award:
  - Paul Thomas Anderson – Boogie Nights and Hard Eight
- Special Citation:
  - Peter Bogdanovich
