= 3rd Critics' Choice Awards =

1998 US film awards

3rd Critics' Choice Movie Awards
- Date: January 20, 1998
- Official website: www.criticschoice.com

Highlights
- Best Film: L.A. Confidential

The 3rd Critics' Choice Movie Awards were presented on January 20, 1998, honoring the finest achievements of 1997 filmmaking.

== Top 10 films ==
(in alphabetical order)

- Amistad
- As Good as It Gets
- Boogie Nights
- Donnie Brasco
- The Full Monty
- Good Will Hunting
- L.A. Confidential
- Titanic
- Wag the Dog
- The Wings of the Dove

== Winners ==
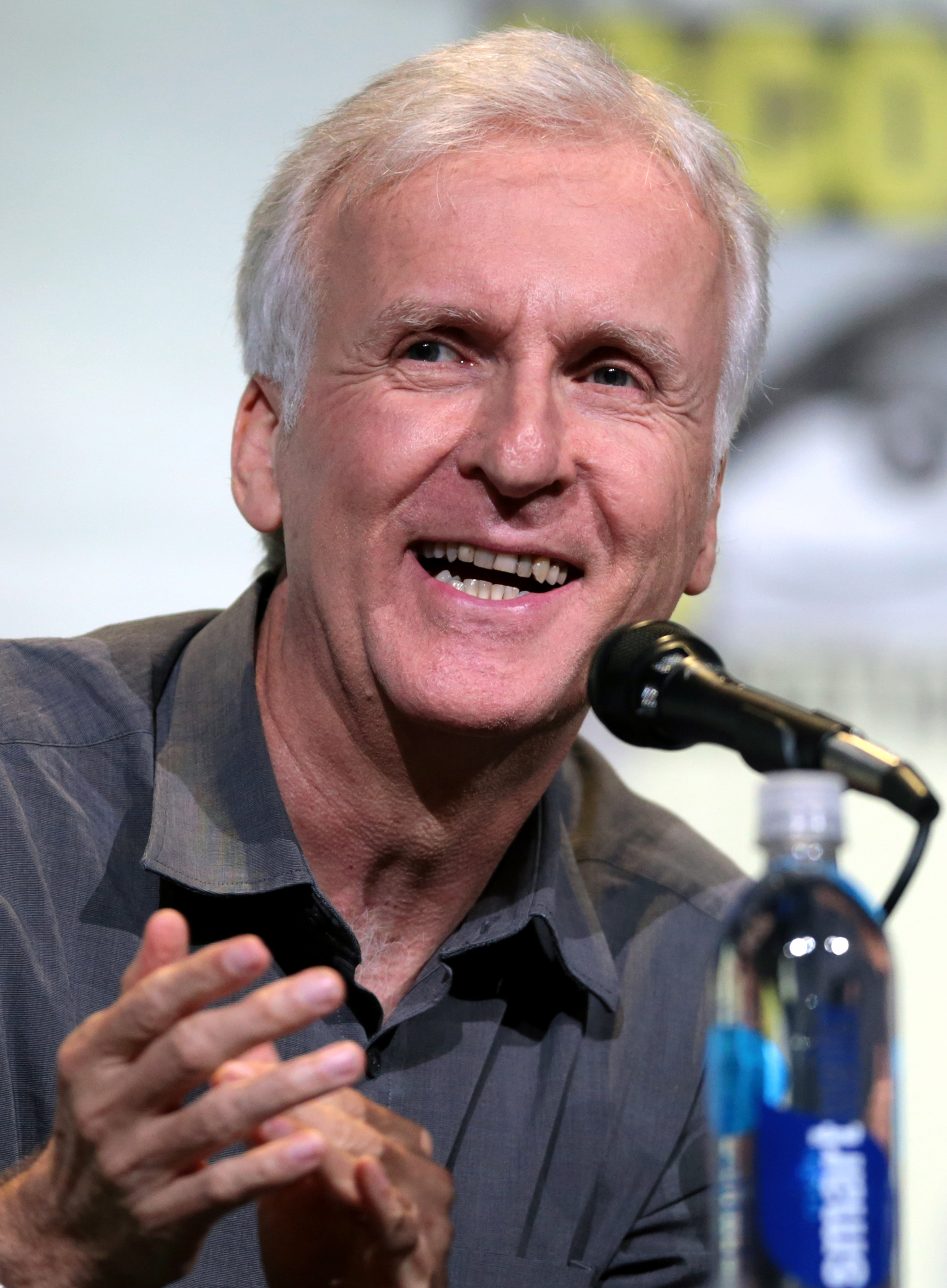
James Cameron, Best Director winner

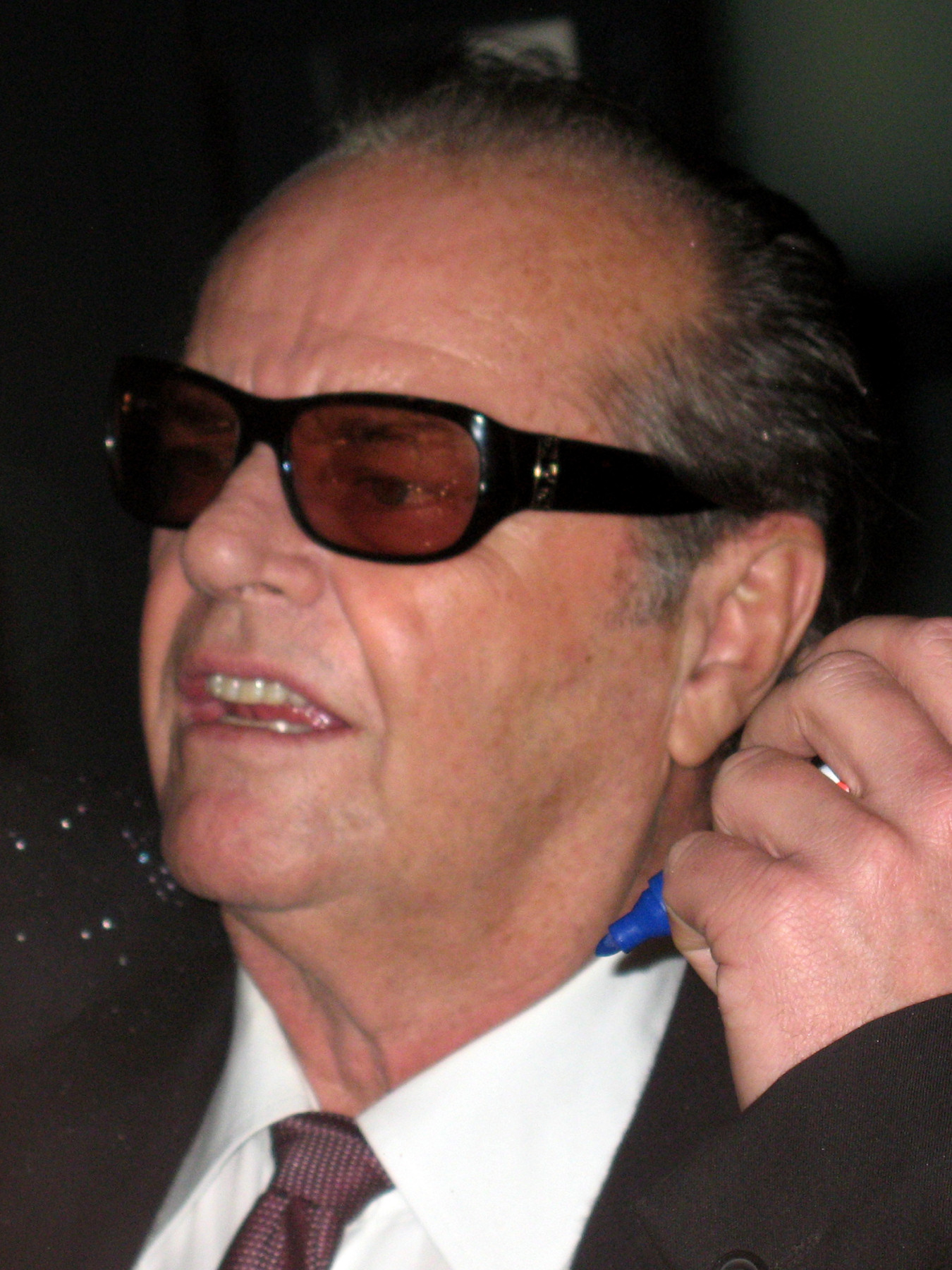
Jack Nicholson, Best Actor winner

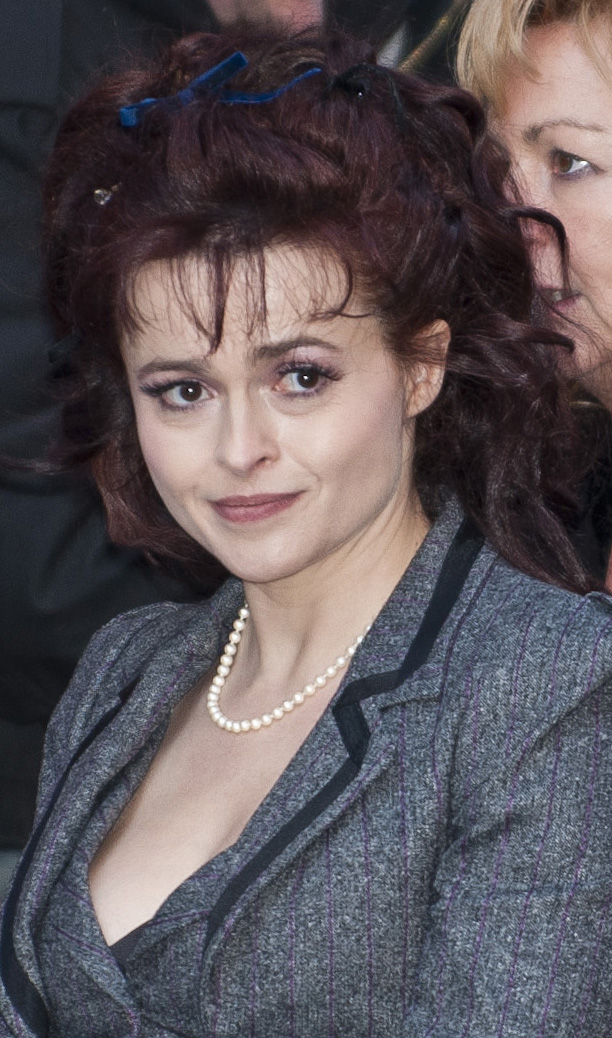
Helena Bonham Carter, Best Actress winner

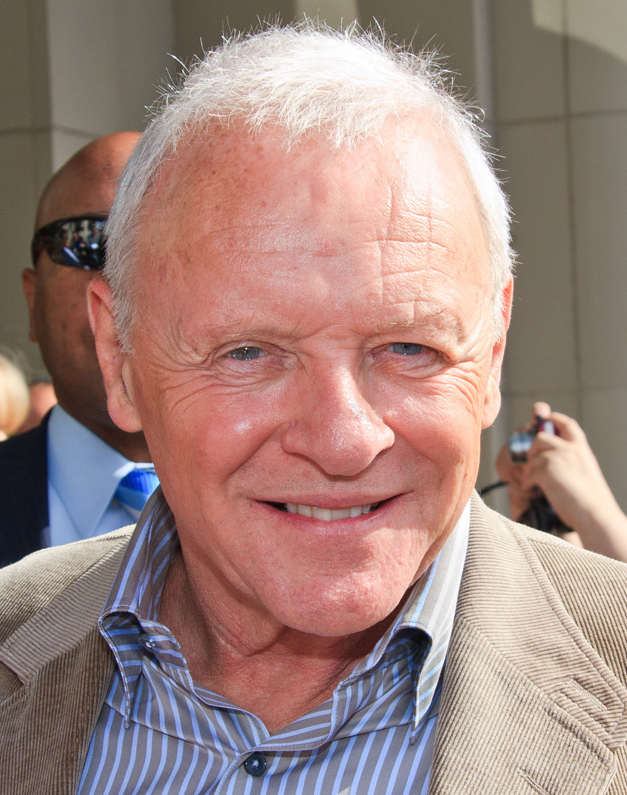
Anthony Hopkins, Best Supporting Actor winner

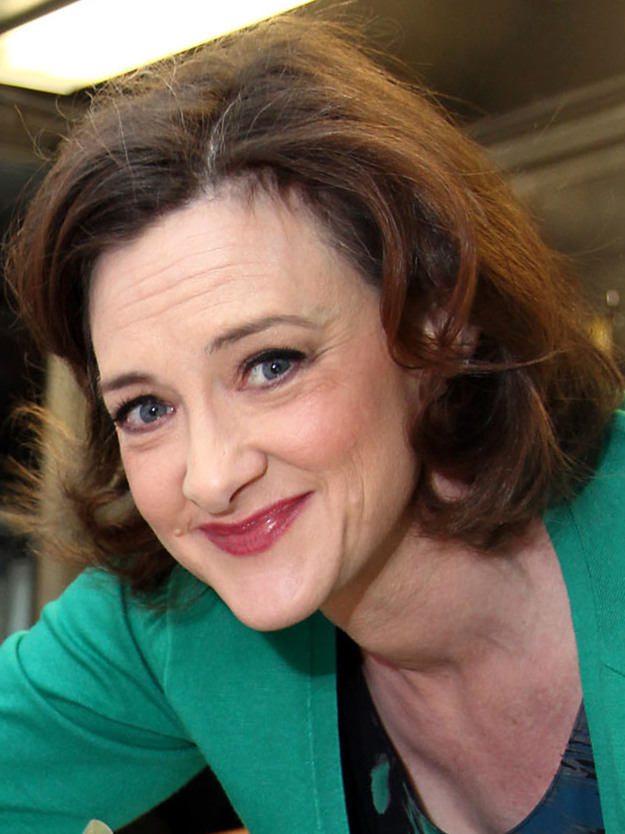
Joan Cusack, Best Supporting Actress winner

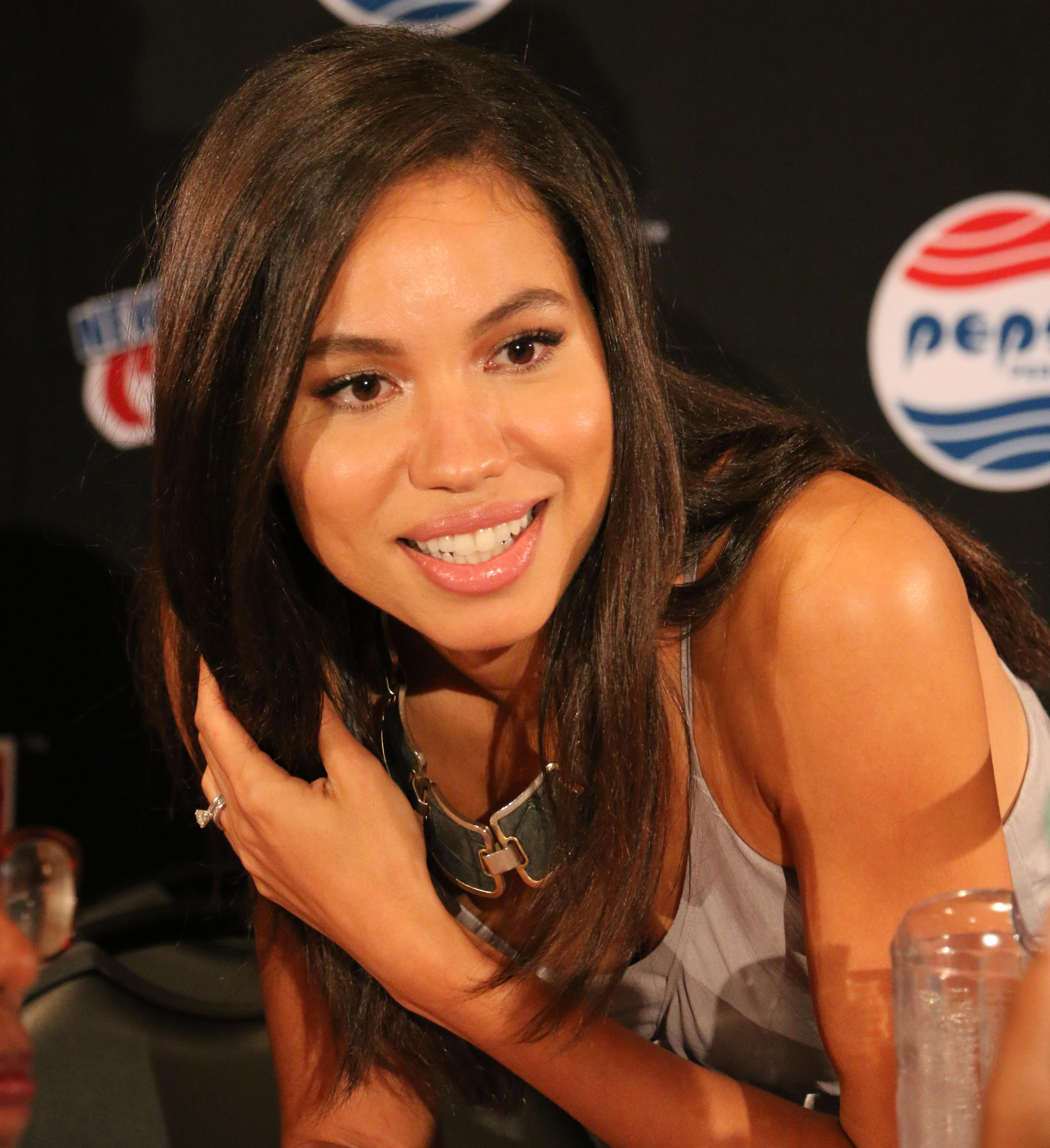
Jurnee Smollett, Best Child Performance winner

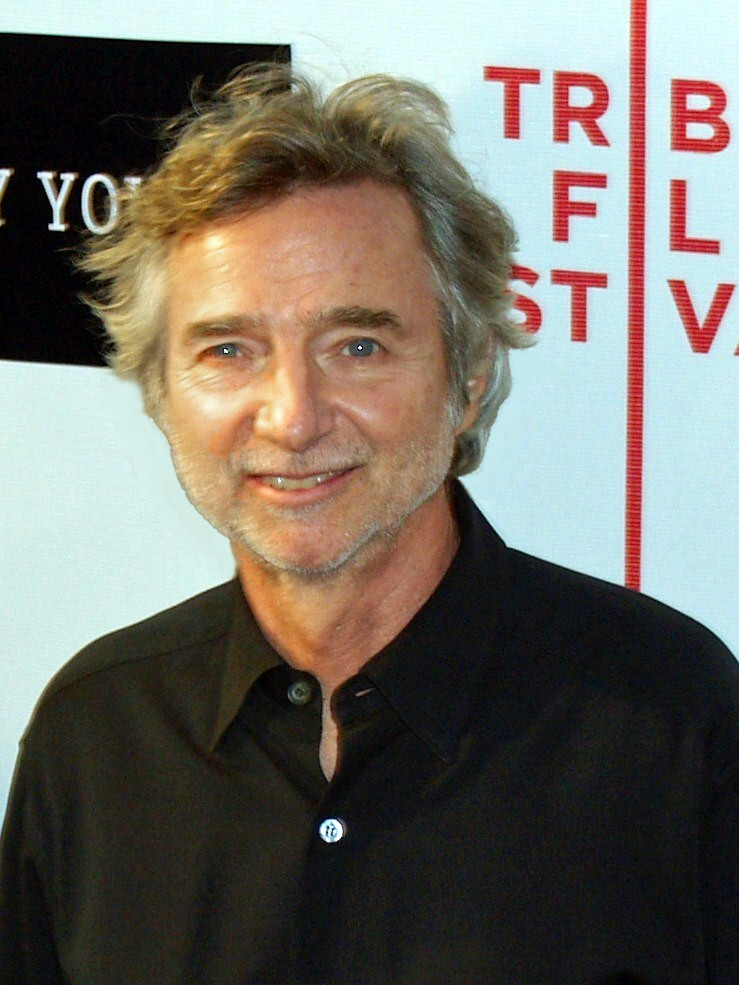
Curtis Hanson, Best Screenplay Adaptation co-winner

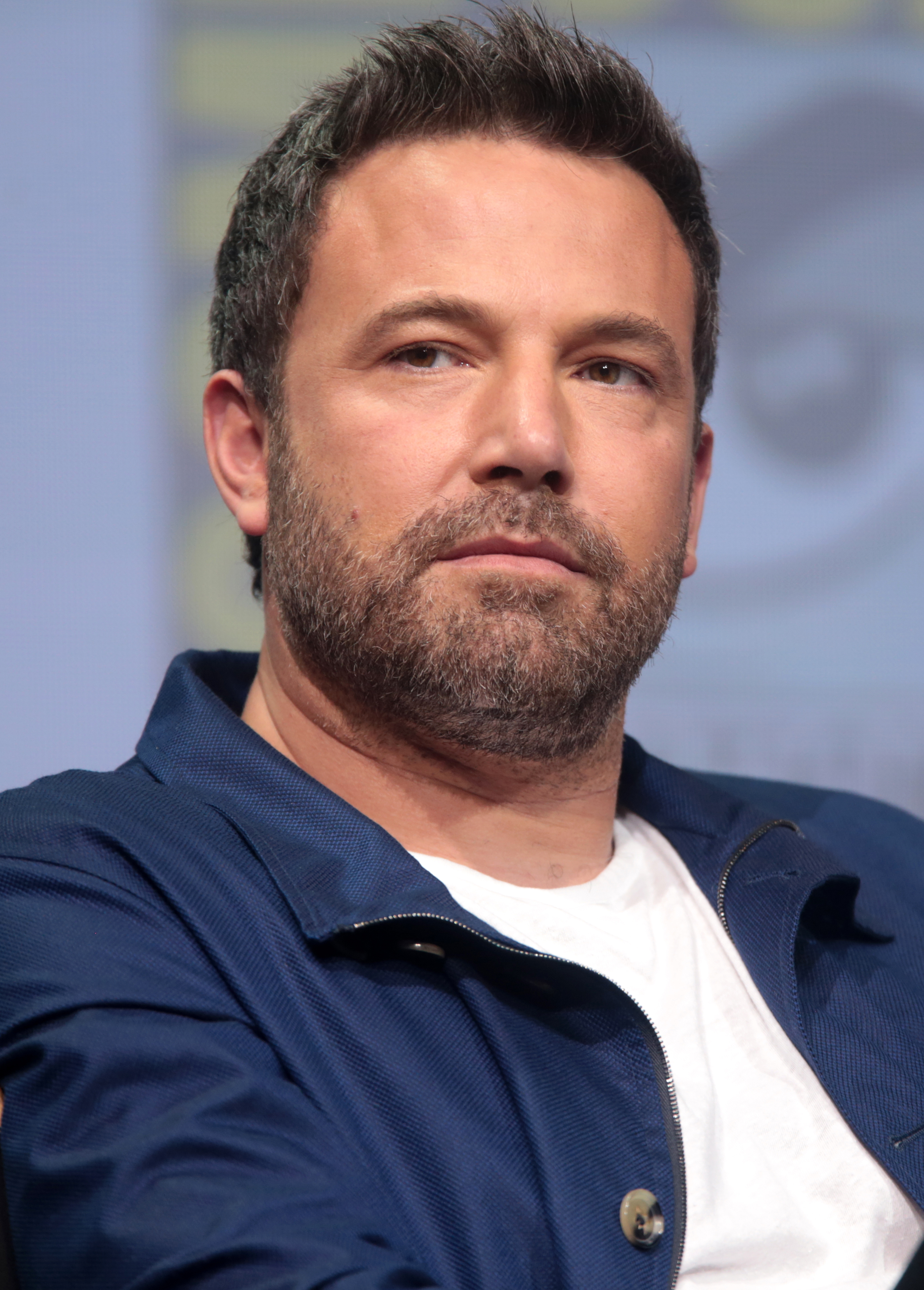
Ben Affleck, Best Original Screenplay co-winner

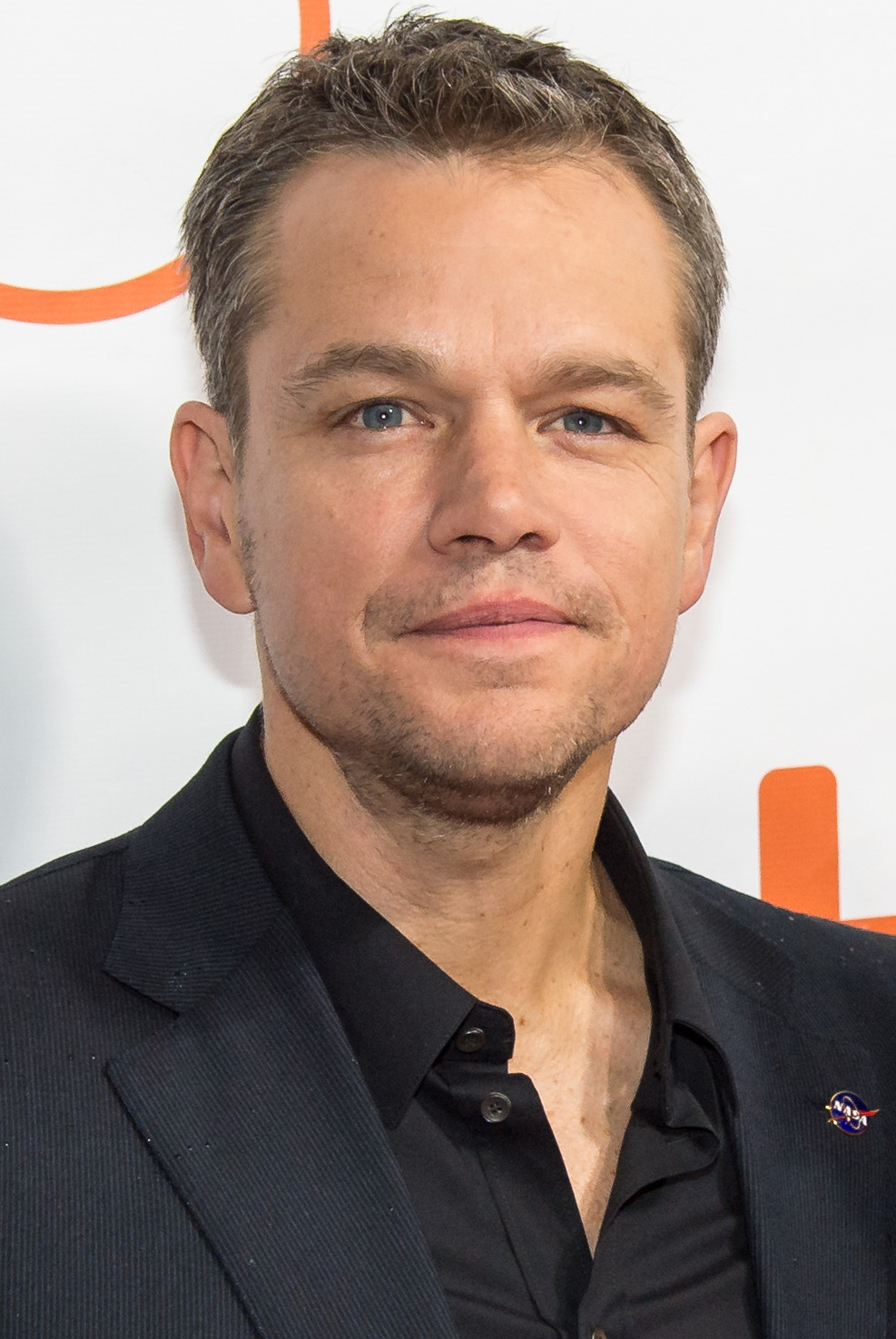
Matt Damon, Best Original Screenplay co-winner and Breakthrough Performer winner

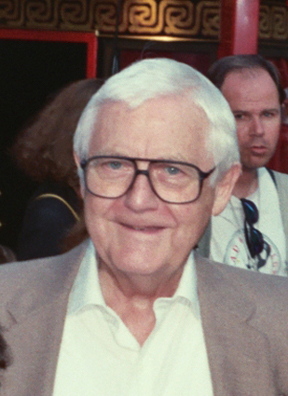
Robert Wise, Lifetime Achievement Award winner

- Best Actor:
  - Jack Nicholson – As Good as It Gets
- Best Actress:
  - Helena Bonham Carter – The Wings of the Dove
- Best Child Performance:
  - Jurnee Smollett – Eve's Bayou
- Best Director:
  - James Cameron – Titanic
- Best Documentary:
  - 4 Little Girls
- Best Family Film:
  - Anastasia
- Best Foreign Language Film:
  - Shall We Dance? (Shall we dansu?) • Japan
- Best Original Screenplay:
  - Good Will Hunting – Ben Affleck and Matt Damon
- Best Picture:
  - L.A. Confidential
- Best Picture Made for Television:
  - Don King: Only in America
- Best Screenplay Adaptation:
  - L.A. Confidential – Curtis Hanson and Brian Helgeland
- Best Supporting Actor:
  - Anthony Hopkins – Amistad
- Best Supporting Actress:
  - Joan Cusack – In & Out
- Breakthrough Performer:
  - Matt Damon – Good Will Hunting
- Lifetime Achievement Award:
  - Robert Wise
