= Toronto Film Critics Association Award for Best Actor =

Canadian film award

The Toronto Film Critics Association Award for Best Actor was an annual award given by the Toronto Film Critics Association, honouring the best performances by male actors in films.

== Winners ==
=== 1990s ===
Year	Winner	Film	Role	Ref
1997	Ian Holm	The Sweet Hereafter	Mitchell Stephens	
1997	Jack Nicholson	As Good As It Gets	Melvin Udall	
1998	Ian McKellen	Gods and Monsters	James Whale	
1998	Robert Duvall	The Apostle	Sonny Dewey	
1998	Tom Hanks	Saving Private Ryan	John H. Miller	
1999	Kevin Spacey	American Beauty	Lester Burnham	
1999	Jim Carrey	Man on the Moon	Andy Kaufman	

=== 2000s ===
Year	Winner	Film	Role	Ref
2000	Benicio del Toro	Traffic	Javier Rodriguez	
2000	Mark Ruffalo	You Can Count on Me	Terry	
2001	Ed Harris	Pollock	Jackson Pollock	
2001	John Cameron Mitchell	Hedwig and the Angry Inch	Hedwig Robinson	
2001	Jack Nicholson	The Pledge	Jerry Black	
2002	Nicolas Cage	Adaptation.	Charlie and Donald Kaufman	
2002	Daniel Day-Lewis	Gangs of New York	William "Bill the Butcher" Cutting	
2002	Jack Nicholson	About Schmidt	Warren R. Schmidt	
2003	Bill Murray	Lost in Translation	Bob Harris	
2004	Paul Giamatti	Sideways	Miles Raymond	
2005	Philip Seymour Hoffman	Capote	Truman Capote	
2006	Sacha Baron Cohen	Borat	Borat Sagdiyev	
2006	Ryan Gosling	Half Nelson	Dan Dunne	
2006	Forest Whitaker	The Last King of Scotland	Idi Amin	
2007	Viggo Mortensen	Eastern Promises	Nikolai Luzhin	
2007	George Clooney	Michael Clayton	Michael Clayton	
2007	Gordon Pinsent	Away from Her	Grant Anderson	
2008	Mickey Rourke	The Wrestler	Robin Ramzinski / Randy "The Ram" Robinson	
2008	Sean Penn	Milk	Harvey Milk	
2008	Jean-Claude Van Damme	JCVD	Himself	
2009	Nicolas Cage	Bad Lieutenant: Port of Call New Orleans	Terence McDonagh	
2009	George Clooney	Up in the Air	Ryan Bingham	
2009	Michael Fassbender	Hunger	Bobby Sands	
2009	Colin Firth	A Single Man	George Falconer	
2009	Viggo Mortensen	The Road	Man	

=== 2010s ===
Year	Winner	Film	Role	Ref
2010	Jesse Eisenberg	The Social Network	Mark Zuckerberg	
2010	Colin Firth	The King's Speech	King George VI	
2010	James Franco	127 Hours	Aron Ralston	
2011	Michael Shannon	Take Shelter	Curtis LaForche	
2011	George Clooney	The Descendants	Matthew "Matt" King	
2011	Michael Fassbender	Shame	Brandon Sullivan	
2012	Denis Lavant	Holy Motors	Mr. Oscar	
2012	Daniel Day-Lewis	Lincoln	Abraham Lincoln	
2012	Joaquin Phoenix	The Master	Freddie Quell	
2013	Oscar Isaac	Inside Llewyn Davis	Llewyn Davis	
2013	Chiwetel Ejiofor	12 Years a Slave	Solomon Northup	
2013	Matthew McConaughey	Dallas Buyers Club	Ron Woodroof	
2014	Tom Hardy	Locke	Ivan Locke	
2014	Ralph Fiennes	The Grand Budapest Hotel	Monsieur Gustave H.	
2014	Jake Gyllenhaal	Nightcrawler	Louis "Lou" Bloom	
2015	Tom Hardy	Legend	The Kray Twins	
2015	Leonardo DiCaprio	The Revenant	Hugh Glass	
2015	Michael Fassbender	Steve Jobs	Steve Jobs	
2016	Adam Driver	Paterson	Paterson	
2016	Casey Affleck	Manchester by the Sea	Lee Chandler	
2016	Peter Simonischek	Toni Erdmann	Winfried Conradi / Toni Erdmann	
2017	Daniel Day-Lewis	Phantom Thread	Reynolds Woodcock	
2017	Timothée Chalamet	Call Me by Your Name	Elio Perlman	
2017	Gary Oldman	Darkest Hour	Winston Churchill	
2018	Ethan Hawke	First Reformed	Reverend Ernst Toller	
2018	Willem Dafoe	At Eternity's Gate	Vincent van Gogh	
2018	Viggo Mortensen	Green Book	Tony Lip	
2019	Adam Driver	Marriage Story	Charlie Barber	
2019	Antonio Banderas	Pain and Glory	Salvador Mallo	
2019	Adam Sandler	Uncut Gems	Howard Ratner	

=== 2020s ===
Year	Winner	Film	Role	Ref
2020	Riz Ahmed	Sound of Metal	Ruben Stone	
2020	Chadwick Boseman	Ma Rainey's Black Bottom	Levee Green	
2020	Mads Mikkelsen	Another Round (Druk)	Martin	
2021	Denzel Washington	The Tragedy of Macbeth	Macbeth	
2021	Benedict Cumberbatch	The Power of the Dog	Phil Burbank	
2021	Andrew Garfield	tick, tick... BOOM!	Jonathan Larson	
2022	Paul Mescal	Aftersun	Calum Paterson	
2022	Colin Farrell	The Banshees of Inisherin	Pádraic Súilleabháin	
2022	Brendan Fraser	The Whale	Charlie	
