= National Board of Review Awards 1997 =

1997 film awards by National Board of Review

69th National Board of Review Awards

December 9, 1997

Best Picture:
L.A. Confidential

The 69th National Board of Review Awards, honoring the best in filmmaking in 1997, were announced on 9 December 1997 and given on 9 February 1998.

== Top 10 films ==
1. L.A. Confidential
2. As Good as It Gets
3. The Wings of the Dove
4. Good Will Hunting
5. Titanic
6. The Sweet Hereafter
7. Boogie Nights
8. The Full Monty
9. The Rainmaker
10. Jackie Brown

== Top Foreign Films ==
1. Shall We Dance?
2. Beaumarchais, l'insolent
3. Ma vie en rose
4. La Promesse
5. Ponette

== Winners ==
- Best Picture:
  - L.A. Confidential
- Best Foreign Film:
  - Shall We Dance?
- Best Actor:
  - Jack Nicholson - As Good as It Gets
- Best Actress:
  - Helena Bonham Carter - The Wings of the Dove
- Best Supporting Actor:
  - Greg Kinnear - As Good as It Gets
- Best Supporting Actress:
  - Anne Heche - Donnie Brasco, Wag the Dog
- Best Acting by an Ensemble
  - The Sweet Hereafter
- Breakthrough Performance:
  - Bai Ling - Red Corner
- Best Director:
  - Curtis Hanson - L.A. Confidential
- Outstanding Directorial Debut:
  - Kasi Lemmons - Eve's Bayou
- Best Documentary:
  - Fast, Cheap and Out of Control
- Career Achievement Award:
  - Robert Duvall
- Billy Wilder Award for Excellence in Directing:
  - Francis Ford Coppola
- Special Achievement in Filmmaking:
  - Ben Affleck and Matt Damon - Good Will Hunting
- William K. Everson Award for Film History
  - Gavin Lambert, Nazimova
- Freedom of Expression:
  - Richard Gere and Jon Avnet - Red Corner
- Special Citations:
  - Edward Bernds, Lifetime Achievement in Film Technology
  - James Cameron, Special Effects Technology, Titanic
- Special Recognition for Excellence in Filmmaking:
  - The Apostle
  - Chasing Amy
  - The Daytrippers
  - Different for Girls
  - Gridlock'd
  - In the Company of Men
  - Star Maps
  - The Tango Lesson
  - Telling Lies in America
  - Welcome to Sarajevo
