= 1997 New York Film Critics Circle Awards =

63rd New York Film Critics Circle Awards

63rd NYFCC Awards

announced: December 11, 1997
given: January 4, 1998

Best Picture:
L.A. Confidential

The 63rd New York Film Critics Circle Awards, honoring the best in film for 1997, were announced on 11 December 1997 and given on 4 January 1998.

== Winners ==
- Best Actor:
  - Peter Fonda - Ulee's Gold
  - Runners-up: Ian Holm - The Sweet Hereafter and Robert Duvall - The Apostle
- Best Actress:
  - Julie Christie - Afterglow
  - Runners-up: Helena Bonham Carter - The Wings of the Dove and Judi Dench - Mrs Brown
- Best Cinematography:
  - Roger Deakins - Kundun
- Best Director:
  - Curtis Hanson - L.A. Confidential
  - Runner-up: Atom Egoyan - The Sweet Hereafter
- Best Documentary Film:
  - Fast, Cheap & Out of Control
- Best Film:
  - L.A. Confidential
  - Runners-up: The Sweet Hereafter and Titanic
- Best First Film:
  - Neil LaBute - In the Company of Men
- Best Foreign Language Film:
  - Ponette • France
  - Runners-up: Shall We Dance? (Shall we dansu?) • Japan, Underground • France/Germany/FR Yugoslavia and Ma Vie en Rose • France/Belgium/UK
- Best Screenplay:
  - Curtis Hanson and Brian Helgeland - L.A. Confidential
- Best Supporting Actor:
  - Burt Reynolds - Boogie Nights
- Best Supporting Actress:
  - Joan Cusack - In & Out
