= Ponette =

- French theatrical release poster
- Directed by: Jacques Doillon
- Written by: Jacques Doillon
- Produced by: Alain Sarde
- Starring: Victoire Thivisol; Claire Nebout
- Cinematography: Caroline Champetier
- Edited by: Jacqueline Lecompte
- Music by: Philippe Sarde
- Distributed by: BAC Films
- Release date: 25 September 1996 (France)
- Running time: 97 minutes
- Country: France
- Language: French
- Budget: €2.7 million
- Box office: $3.9 million

Ponette is a 1996 French film directed by Jacques Doillon. The film centers on four-year-old Ponette (Victoire Thivisol), who is coming to terms with the death of her mother in a car crash.

The film received acclaim for Thivisol's performance, who was only four at the time of filming.

== Plot ==
Before the film begins, Ponette's mother dies in a car crash, which Ponette herself survives with only a broken arm (she consequently must wear an arm cast).

Following her mother's death, Ponette's father (Xavier Beauvois) leaves the young girl with her Aunt Claire (Claire Nebout), and her cousins Matiaz (Matiaz Bureau Caton) and Delphine (Delphine Schiltz). Ponette and her cousins are later sent to a boarding school. There, the loss of her mother becomes even more harsh and painful when she is mocked on the playground for being motherless.

Not yet having come to terms with her mother's death, Ponette searches for her. Ponette becomes increasingly withdrawn, and spends most of her time waiting for her mother to come back.

When waiting alone fails, Ponette enlists the help of her school friend Ada (Léopoldine Serre) to help her become a "child of God" to hopefully convince God to return her mother, in vain.

In the end, Ponette visits a cemetery and cries for her mother, who suddenly appears to comfort her and ask her to live her life and not be sad all the time. Her mother (played by Marie Trintignant) says she cannot keep coming back, so Ponette must move on and go be happy with her father.

Then, it appears that her mother gives her a sweater that she did not bring to the cemetery, and her father comments when he sees her that "I haven't seen that sweater in a while".

== Cast ==
- Victoire Thivisol as Ponette
- Delphine Schiltz as Delphine
- Matiaz Bureau Caton as Matiaz
- Léopoldine Serre as Ada
- Marie Trintignant as Mother
- Xavier Beauvois as Father
- Claire Nebout as Aunt Claire

== Critical response ==
On the review aggregator website Rotten Tomatoes, the film has an approval rating of 92%, based on 25 reviews, with an average rating of 8.2/10.

== Accolades ==
Award / Film Festival	Category	Recipients and nominees	Result
National Board of Review Award	Top Foreign Films		Won
New York Film Critics Circle Award	Best Foreign Language Film		Won
Online Film Critics Society Award	Best Foreign Language Film		Nominated
Online Film & Television Association Award	Best Breakthrough Performance - Female	Victoire Thivisol	Won
Online Film & Television Association Award	Best Foreign Language Film		Nominated
São Paulo International Film Festival	Critics Prize		Won
Satellite Award	Best Foreign Language Film		Nominated
Society of Texas Film Critics Awards	Best Foreign Film		2nd place
Venice Film Festival	Volpi Cup for Best Actress	Victoire Thivisol	Won
Venice Film Festival	FIPRESCI Prize		Won
Venice Film Festival	OCIC Award		Won
Venice Film Festival	Sergio Trasatti Award		Won
Venice Film Festival	Golden Lion		Nominated
Young Artist Award	Best Family Foreign Film		Won
Young Artist Award	Best Young Performer in a Foreign Film	Victoire Thivisol	Won
