= Eve's Bayou =

1997 American drama film by Kasi Lemmons

- Theatrical release poster
- Directed by: Kasi Lemmons
- Written by: Kasi Lemmons
- Produced by: Caldecot Chubb; Samuel L. Jackson; Mark Amin; Nick Wechsler
- Starring: Samuel L. Jackson; Lynn Whitfield; Debbi Morgan; Vondie Curtis-Hall; Branford Marsalis; Lisa Nicole Carson; Jurnee Smollett; Diahann Carroll
- Cinematography: Amy Vincent
- Edited by: Terilyn A. Shropshire
- Music by: Terence Blanchard
- Production companies: ChubbCo Film; Addis-Wechsler
- Distributed by: Trimark Pictures
- Release dates: September 7, 1997 (Toronto International Film Festival); November 7, 1997 (United States)
- Running time: 109 minutes 116 minutes (Director's Cut)
- Country: United States
- Language: English
- Budget: $3–4 million
- Box office: $14.8 million

Eve's Bayou is a 1997 American Southern Gothic drama film written and directed by Kasi Lemmons in her feature directorial debut. Samuel L. Jackson served as a producer, and starred in the film with Lisa Nicole Carson, Jurnee Smollett, Lynn Whitfield, Debbi Morgan, Meagan Good, and Diahann Carroll. Following its premiere at the 1997 Toronto International Film Festival, it was released in theaters on November 7, 1997 to both critical and commercial success; it grossed $14 million domestically on a budget of $4 million, becoming the most commercially successful independent film of 1997. The unreliability of memory and observation function as important themes throughout the film.

In 2018, the film was selected by the Library of Congress for preservation in the United States National Film Registry as being "culturally, historically, or aesthetically significant".

== Plot ==
In 1962, Eve Batiste, a 10-year-old girl, lives in a prosperous Creole-American community in Louisiana with her 9-year-old brother Poe and her 14-year-old sister Cisely. Their father Louis, a well-respected doctor in Louisiana's African American community, claims descent from the French aristocrat Jean Paul Batiste, who founded the town of Eve's Bayou and named it after the slave woman whose medicinal abilities cured him of a severe case of cholera. One night after a raucous party, Eve accidentally witnesses her father having sex with Matty Mereaux, a family friend. However, Cisely, who has a very affectionate relationship with her father, convinces Eve that she misinterpreted an innocent moment.

The summer quickly becomes chaotic and stressful for the Batiste family. Eve's relationship with her parents becomes more strained as she discovers more evidence of her father's serial infidelity. Cisely comes into conflict with both Eve and their mother Roz as she enters puberty and tries to navigate the difficult transition to adulthood, particularly with regard to her appearance and sexuality. Roz eventually begins to suspect her husband's infidelity, prompting conflict between the two as well. Eve often seeks refuge with her aunt Mozelle, a hoodoo practitioner with a neighborhood reputation as "The Black Widow". Eve, who also has the spiritual gift of sight, has a premonitory dream shortly before an accident occurs that claims Mozelle's third husband.

Mozelle's gift also brings her into direct conflict with Elzora, a fortuneteller and possible witch with similar abilities. When Roz visits her for a reading, Elzora implies that an unexpected "solution" to her problem will arise, but to wait and look to her children in the meantime. When Mozelle grudgingly makes a similar request, Elzora forces her to confront the truth she has been denying. Meanwhile, Eve, frustrated by her father's infidelity, begins to act out, bringing her into conflict with her other family members. Cisely begins acting strangely as well, isolating herself from her family after experiencing her first period.

Cisely later confides in Eve the secret behind her strange mood: one night, after their parents had a vicious argument, Cisely went to comfort her father and he, while intoxicated, attempted to molest her. Enraged, Eve seeks out Elzora to commission a voodoo spell that will put a fatal curse on her father. En route to Elzora's residence, Eve encounters Lenny Mereaux and questions him about his teaching job that keeps him away from home. In the conversation, she alludes to a possible tryst between his wife Matty and her father.

When Eve finally arrives at Elzora's home, she finds her to be not as malevolent as she expected but rather normal instead. Expecting to receive a voodoo doll of her father, she is instead simply told that the curse has been placed per her request. With regret, and in an attempt to save her father, Eve rushes to bring him home after finding him in a bar speaking with Matty Mereaux. Simultaneously, a drunken Lenny arrives to take Matty home. After a confrontation, Lenny and Matty depart, and Lenny tells Louis that he will kill him if he talks to Matty again. After Louis bids farewell to Matty, Lenny shoots and kills Louis.

After returning home from her father's funeral, Eve discovers a letter among her father's belongings that he composed and addressed to Mozelle. Reading it aloud, she learns that her father disputed the accusations, claiming that Cisely had approached him the night of the incident and kissed him, first as a daughter and then as a lover. While intoxicated, he violently slapped her and pushed her to the ground, infuriating her. Confronting Cisely, Eve attempts to use her second sight and discover what really happened. While she is able to confirm that a kiss occurred between Cisely and Louis, the rest of the vision—like Cisely's memory of the night—is fragmented. The sisters burn the letter and discard it into the bayou before standing together and holding hands, gazing at the sunset.

== Cast ==
- Jurnee Smollett as Eve Batiste
  - Tamara Tunie as adult Eve (voice)
- Meagan Good as Cisely Batiste
- Debbi Morgan as Mozelle Batiste Delacroix
- Samuel L. Jackson as Louis Batiste
- Lynn Whitfield as Roz Batiste
- Jake Smollett as Poe Batiste
- Diahann Carroll as Elzora
- Ethel Ayler as Gran Mere
- Lisa Nicole Carson as Matty Mereaux
- Roger Guenveur Smith as Lenny Mereaux
- Vondie Curtis-Hall as Julian Grayraven
- Branford Marsalis as Harry
- Carol Sutton as Madame Renard
- Victoria Rowell as Stevie Hobbs

== Production ==
=== Development ===
Kasi Lemmons first wrote the screenplay in 1993. Lemmons said the screenplay "originated as a series of short stories, and the children were the first layers in the short stories." Lemmons was inspired by childhood trips she took to Louisiana, saying she "wanted to write a story about people who were like royalty in a small town. Louisiana has a unique history in the U.S. It was one of the only places where slaves could buy their freedom. Even in the 1700s, there were free people of color who had citizenship because the state was owned by the French."

Though the story is not autobiographical, Lemmons said "there are definitely pieces of my family in it", and that the writing process was therapeutic, as it allowed her to process "things that happened to me—things that I was still wrestling with...At the core of Eve, it’s me and my childhood and wrestling with how powerful I was as a child. How did I fight my way through uncomfortable situations and the distress that I felt?”

When Lemmons and producer Caldecot Chubb could not find interest from studios to finance the film or potential directors to helm the production, Lemmons decided to direct it herself. After reading the script, Samuel L. Jackson came on board as both a producer and lead actor. Jackson said, "Louis Batiste was definitely someone I hadn't seen before. A family man with interesting conflicts and a romantic and glamorous life. I don't get to play those kinds of guys." In 1996, the independent company Trimark Pictures agreed to finance the film.

=== Casting ===
Lemmons had known many of the film's principal actors from her days acting in New York theatre. Meagan Good was originally cast as 10-year-old Eve Batiste, but by the time the film's financing came together, Good had grown out of the role and was instead cast as Eve's older sister Cisely.

=== Filming ===
Filming took place in the fall of 1996 in Covington and Madisonville in Louisiana. The Otis House at Fairview-Riverside State Park was used as the Batiste family estate.

== Release ==
=== Home media ===
Eve's Bayou was released on DVD on February 19, 2004. A 116-minute director's cut of the film was made a part of The Criterion Collection on October 25, 2022.

== Reception ==
The film received positive reviews, with the Chicago Sun-Times' Roger Ebert naming it the best film of 1997. CNN's Paul Tatara, Empire, Entertainment Weekly, the Los Angeles Times, The New York Observer, The New York Times, Time, Variety, and The Washington Post also enthusiastically praised the film and its performances.

On review aggregator Rotten Tomatoes, the film has an approval rating of 84% based on 134 reviews. The website's critical consensus reads, "Eve's Bayou marks a striking feature debut for director Kasi Lemmons, layering terrific performances and Southern mysticism into a measured meditation on disillusionment and forgiveness." Metacritic, which uses a weighted average, assigned the film a score of 78 out of 100, based on 21 critics, indicating "generally favorable" reviews.

In a 2017 retrospective essay for Vulture, Angelica Jade Bastién wrote, "The film operates deftly on multiple levels: It’s a stunning coming-of-age tale (an exceedingly rare example of one that privileges the experience of young black girls); an honest, hyperspecific portrait of black life in rural Louisiana; and one of the greatest writer-director debuts in American cinematic history."

The film received multiple accolades, including Best First Feature at the Independent Spirit Awards and Outstanding Directorial Debut for Kasi Lemmons from the National Board of Review Awards. Debbi Morgan's performance would be her most honored film role to date, with awards for Best Supporting Actress from the Chicago Film Critics Association Awards and the Independent Spirit Awards, alongside four other nominations. The film is also seen as a breakthrough for Jurnee Smollett; up to that point, she had primarily worked as a TV actress. For her performance, Smollett won a Critics' Choice Award and a San Diego Film Critics Society Award.

== Impact ==
In February 2008, Eve's Bayou made Time's list of the "25 Most Important Films on Race".

On February 22, 2009, Debbi Morgan's portrayal of Mozelle Batiste Delacroix was included in PopMatters' 100 Essential Female Film Performances list.

In 2012, Jurnee Smollett's role as Eve Batiste was included in Essence's 25 Best Roles for Black Actresses list.

British progressive rock band The Pineapple Thief took their name from a line in this film.

== Accolades ==
1997 Broadcast Film Critics Association Awards

- Best Child Performance – Jurnee Smollett (winner)

1997 Chicago Film Critics Association Awards

- Best Supporting Actress – Debbi Morgan (winner)

1997 National Board of Review Awards

- Outstanding Directorial Debut – Kasi Lemmons (winner)

1997 San Diego Film Critics Society Awards

- Best Supporting Actress – Jurnee Smollett (winner)

1998 Acapulco Black Film Festival

- Best Actor – Samuel L. Jackson (winner)
- Best Director – Kasi Lemmons (winner)
- Best Film (winner)
- Best Soundtrack (nominated)

1998 Independent Spirit Awards

- Best First Feature – Caldecot Chubb, Kasi Lemmons, Samuel L. Jackson (winner)
- Best Supporting Female – Debbi Morgan (winner)

1998 NAACP Image Awards

- Outstanding Lead Actor in a Motion Picture – Samuel L. Jackson (nominated)
- Outstanding Lead Actress in a Motion Picture – Lynn Whitfield (nominated)
- Outstanding Motion Picture (nominated)
- Outstanding Supporting Actor in a Motion Picture – Vondie Curtis-Hall (nominated)
- Outstanding Supporting Actress in a Motion Picture – Debbi Morgan (nominated)
- Outstanding Youth Actor/Actress – Jurnee Smollett (nominated)
- Outstanding Youth Actor/Actress – Meagan Good (nominated)

1998 Satellite Awards

- Best Performance by an Actor in a Supporting Role in a Motion Picture (Drama) – Samuel L. Jackson (nominated)
- Best Performance by an Actress in a Supporting Role in a Motion Picture (Drama) – Debbi Morgan (nominated)
- Outstanding Cinematography – Amy Vincent (nominated)

1998 Young Artist Awards

- Best Performance in a Feature Film (Leading Young Actress) – Jurnee Smollett (nominated)

1998 YoungStar Awards

- Best Performance by a Young Actress in a Drama Film – Jurnee Smollett (nominated)
- Best Performance by a Young Actress in a Drama Film – Meagan Good (nominated)
