= The Wings of the Dove (1997 film) =

1997 film by Iain Softley

- Theatrical release poster
- Directed by: Iain Softley
- Screenplay by: Hossein Amini
- Based on: The Wings of the Dove by Henry James
- Produced by: Stephen Evans; David Parfitt
- Starring: Helena Bonham Carter; Linus Roache; Alison Elliott; Elizabeth McGovern; Michael Gambon; Alex Jennings; Charlotte Rampling
- Cinematography: Eduardo Serra
- Edited by: Tariq Anwar
- Music by: Edward Shearmur
- Production company: Renaissance Dove
- Distributed by: Miramax Films
- Release dates: 7 November 1997 (United States); 2 January 1998 (United Kingdom)
- Running time: 102 minutes
- Countries: United Kingdom; United States
- Language: English
- Box office: $13.7 million

The Wings of the Dove is a 1997 romantic drama film directed by Iain Softley and starring Helena Bonham Carter, Linus Roache, and Alison Elliott. The screenplay by Hossein Amini is based on the 1902 novel by Henry James. The film was nominated for four Academy Awards and five BAFTAs, recognizing Bonham Carter's performance, the screenplay, the costume design, and the cinematography.

== Plot ==
In 1910 London, Kate Croy (Helena Bonham Carter) lives under the careful watch of her domineering Aunt Maud (Charlotte Rampling). The wealthy Maud has taken the penniless Kate in as her ward, intending to marry her to a rich man and save her from the fate which befell her recently deceased mother when she married Kate's own dissolute father, Lionel (Michael Gambon). Lord Mark (Alex Jennings), a sophisticated aristocrat with a large estate, begins to court Kate with Maud's approval. However, Kate is secretly in love with a young muckraking journalist named Merton Densher (Linus Roache), whom her aunt has forbidden her from pursuing a relationship with because of his humble circumstances. Nonetheless, she has continued to meet with Merton in secret, though he is growing increasingly impatient for her to leave her aunt and marry him.

Aunt Maud confronts Kate about her continuing association with Merton and threatens to withdraw her financial support from Kate and her father. Kate reluctantly breaks with Merton and refuses to meet with him anymore. A few months later, at a dinner party given by her aunt, Kate is introduced to the wealthy American orphan and heiress Milly Theale (Allison Elliot), who is on an extended trip through Europe with her travelling companion Susan Stringham (Elizabeth McGovern). The cynical Kate is captivated by Milly's beauty, vivaciousness and humour, and the two form a strong friendship. Kate and Merton reconcile and resume their secret meetings; one day they run into Milly, and Kate introduces Merton as a family friend. Soon after, Milly invites Kate to accompany her and Susan to Venice.

Before leaving, Lord Mark secretly reveals to Kate that Milly is terminally ill and that although he desires Kate he needs to marry Milly and her fortune to avoid losing his estates. Aware that Milly is indifferent to Lord Mark but is smitten with Merton, Kate invites Merton to Venice and persuades him to show Milly affection in an effort to seduce her. Kate expects that the orphaned and lonely Milly will leave him her fortune after her death.

During Kate's, Milly's, and Merton's excursions through Venice, Kate gradually becomes jealous of Milly's attraction to Merton, so much so that she lures him away one night to have sex. Milly confronts her the next morning, though Kate denies that Merton is her lover. She realises that, if her scheme is to succeed, she must leave Venice without warning Merton. On their own in Venice, Merton's affection for Milly grows and the two form a strong bond, even as her condition worsens. One day Merton spots Lord Mark at a cafe; alarmed, he goes to visit Milly but is denied entry. Susan visits him and Merton realises that Kate has revealed their secret to Lord Mark to sabotage the whole scheme, knowing that Mark would tell Milly as revenge for her rejecting him. Nonetheless, Milly agrees to see Merton and the two share an intimate moment where she forgives him and says that she still loves both him and Kate, despite their actions. A few days later, Milly dies and Merton and Susan attend her funeral.

After Merton returns to London, Kate comes to Merton's flat. She asks why he has not come to see her in the weeks he has been back and finds a letter from Milly's lawyers, informing Merton that Milly did indeed bequeath a sizable portion of her estate to him. Merton tells Kate that he will not take the money, and she must marry him without it if they are to be together. They make love and afterwards Kate agrees, with the condition he tells her that he is not still in love with his memory of Milly. He cannot, and Kate leaves him for good, knowing that her conniving has backfired. Merton returns alone to Venice, while in the background we hear Milly's voice repeating her confident assertion that Merton will be coming into his own, and sooner than he thinks.

== Cast ==
- Helena Bonham Carter as Kate Croy
- Alison Elliott as Milly Theale
- Linus Roache as Merton Densher
- Elizabeth McGovern as Susan Stringham
- Charlotte Rampling as Aunt Maud
- Michael Gambon as Lionel Croy
- Alex Jennings as Lord Mark

== Production ==
Filming for The Wings of the Dove took place over the summer of 1996, with eight weeks spent in London and six in Venice. London exterior locations include Brompton Cemetery on the Fulham Road; Carlton House Terrace in St. James's (Aunt Maud's house); Freemasons' Hall in Great Queen Street (Merton's newspaper office); Kensington Gardens; the National Liberal Club in Whitehall; the Richmond Fellowship; and the Old Royal Naval College in Greenwich. Knebworth House in Hertfordshire stood in for Lord Mark's country estate, and Debenham House in Kensington for his London home. Syon House in London was used for the wedding reception scene early in the film. Shepperton Studios was used for the mock-ups of a platform tunnel and passageways representing both Dover Street and Knightsbridge tube stations.

Locations in Venice include St. Mark's Square and the Palazzo Barbaro. The Palazzo Barbaro was where Henry James wrote the original novel and is believed to have inspired Milly's palazzo as it is described in the book.

Costume designer Sandy Powell sought a clear distinction between the outfits the female characters wear in London and Venice, with the London costumes consisting of "chic outfits with the daring feeling of contemporary high fashion, clothes that herald the start of the more provocative "Twenties" fashion". In Venice, Powell sourced luxuriant, loose fitting gowns in lighter colors, reflecting a more "ethnic, North African look". Powell was inspired by the gowns of the early 20th century designer Fortuny; her goal was to reflect the freedom of the characters during their time in the city.

A notable departure from Henry James’ text is the inclusion of a sex scene late in the film, with Kate and Merton naked on a bed. “We went into that with our eyes open,” Iain Softley said. “We had no qualms. We felt it was essential in indicating the sort of scene it was, and making it relevant and familiar in the most stark way possible."

== Release ==
=== Box office ===
The film grossed $13,718,385 in the United States and Canada. It grossed £2,142,932 ($3.6 million) in the United Kingdom for a worldwide total of over $17 million.

=== Critical reception ===
On Rotten Tomatoes, the film has a rating of 86%, based on 35 reviews, with an average rating of 7.8/10. The website's consensus reads, "The Wings of the Dove patiently explores class divisions in early 20th century Europe through the well-written and beautifully acted travails of star-crossed lovers." On Metacritic, the film holds a score of 73 out of 100, based on 18 reviews, indicating "generally favorable reviews".

In his review in The New York Times, Stephen Holden called the film a "spellbinding screen adaptation [that] succeeds where virtually every other film translation of a James novel has stumbled...This magnificent film conveys an intimation of what values count the most, of what really matters, but it is also far too intelligent and sympathetic to human frailty to spell them out. You feel them most of all in the characters' unbridgeable silences."

Edward Guthmann of the San Francisco Chronicle wrote, "The Wings of the Dove was a minor literary work that manages on screen to upstage both Washington Square and The Portrait of a Lady, two superior Henry James novels that came across as stiff and deliberate in recent film translations. This is a breakthrough for Softley, whose earlier films Backbeat and Hackers only hinted at the style and complexity he displays here, and a wonderful showcase for Roache, Elliott and Bonham Carter, who gives her best performance yet."

In Entertainment Weekly, Owen Gleiberman graded the film A and observed it "has a lush yet aching beauty that seems to saturate you as you watch it. I'm not just talking about visual beauty. I'm speaking of dramatic beauty, the exquisite moment-to-moment tension of characters who reveal themselves layer by layer, flowing from thought to feeling and back again, until thought and feeling become drama. Director Iain Softley has made one of the rare movies that evokes not just the essence of a great novel but the experience of it...The Wings of the Dove is, I think, a great film ... that confirms the arrival of major screen talents: director Softley, who works with sublime sensitivity to the intricacies of self-deception; Bonham Carter and Roache, who create a dazzlingly intimate chemistry within the propriety of Jamesian manners; and The Spitfire Grill's Alison Elliott, who, with her beatific charm and Mona Lisa smile, does one of the most difficult things an actress can — she brings goodness itself to life."

David Stratton of Variety stated the film "gives Helena Bonham Carter one of her best opportunities in a while, one which she seizes with relish, looking vibrant and totally convincing in her pivotal role...The Wings of the Dove may be typical of the school of British literary cinema, but Softley's handling of several key elements, including an unusually frank love scene in the later stages, is always inventive. Production values are of the highest standard."

Andrew Johnston, writing in Time Out New York, noted that "Softley and Amini risk making their film seriously anachronistic by emphasizing the plot's pulpish qualities, but the able cast helps make it work." He also observed that "the immaculate production design makes turn-of-the-century London and Venice seem vibrant and real. Wings is a masterful and deeply haunting film; it adds genuine relevance to a genre that typically leans toward the static."

== Accolades ==
Award	Date of ceremony	Category	Nominee	Result
Academy Award	23 March 1998	Best Actress in a Leading Role	Helena Bonham Carter	Nominated
Academy Award	23 March 1998	Best Adapted Screenplay	Hossein Amini	Nominated
Academy Award	23 March 1998	Best Cinematography	Eduardo Serra	Nominated
Academy Award	23 March 1998	Best Costume Design	Sandy Powell	Nominated
BAFTA Award	18 April 1998	Best Cinematography	Eduardo Serra	Won
BAFTA Award	18 April 1998	Best Makeup and Hair	Sallie Jaye and Jan Archibald	Won
BAFTA Award	18 April 1998	Best Actress in a Leading Role	Helena Bonham Carter	Nominated
BAFTA Award	18 April 1998	Best Adapted Screenplay	Hossein Amini	Nominated
BAFTA Award	18 April 1998	Best Costume Design	Sandy Powell	Nominated
Boston Society of Film Critics Award	14 December 1997	Best Actress	Helena Bonham Carter	Won
Boston Society of Film Critics Award	14 December 1997	Best Supporting Actress	Alison Elliott	Nominated
British Society of Cinematographers	29 November 1997	Best Cinematography	Eduardo Serra	Nominated
Broadcast Film Critics Association Award	20 January 1998	Best Actress	Helena Bonham Carter	Won
Broadcast Film Critics Association Award	20 January 1998	Best Picture		Nominated
Chicago Film Critics Association Award	1 March 1998	Best Actress	Helena Bonham Carter	Nominated
Gold Hugo	9–19 October 1997	Best Film	Iain Softley	Nominated
Dallas-Fort Worth Film Critics Association Award	January 1998	Best Supporting Actress	Allison Elliott	Won
Dallas-Fort Worth Film Critics Association Award	January 1998	Best Actress	Helena Bonham Carter	Won
Golden Globe Award	18 January 1998	Best Performance by an Actress in a Motion Picture - Drama	Helena Bonham Carter	Nominated
Kansas City Film Critics Circle Award		Best Actress	Helena Bonham Carter	Won
Sierra Award	January 1998	Best Actress	Helena Bonham Carter	Won
Sierra Award	January 1998	Best Supporting Actress	Allison Elliott	Won
Critics' Circle Film Awards	4 March 1999	British Actress of the Year	Helena Bonham Carter	Won
LAFCA Award	15 January 1996	Best Actress	Helena Bonham Carter	Won
Golden Reel Award	21 March 1998	Best Sound Editing - Foreign Feature		Nominated
National Board of Review of Motion Pictures Award	8 December 1998	Best Actress	Helena Bonham Carter	Won
National Board of Review of Motion Pictures Award	8 December 1998	Top Ten Films		Won
National Society of Film Critics Award	3 January 1998	Best Actress	Helena Bonham Carter	Nominated
New York Film Critics Circle Award	4 January 1998	Best Actress	Helena Bonham Carter	Nominated
Online Film Critics Society Award	11 January 1998	Best Actress	Helena Bonham Carter	Nominated
Satellite Award	22 February 1998	Best Screenplay: Adapted	Hossein Amini	Nominated
Satellite Award	22 February 1998	Best Actress in a Motion Picture	Helena Bonham Carter	Nominated
Satellite Award	22 February 1998	Best Art Direction and Production Design	John Beard	Nominated
Satellite Award	22 February 1998	Best Costume Design	Sandy Powell	Nominated
Society of Texas Film Critics Awards	29 December 1997	Best Actress	Helena Bonham Carter	Won
Screen Actors Guild Award	8 March 1998	Best Performance by a Female Actor in a Leading Role	Helena Bonham Carter	Nominated
Screen Actors Guild Award	8 March 1998	Best Performance by a Female Actor in a Supporting Role	Allison Elliott	Nominated
Southeastern Film Critics Association Award	5 January 1998	Best Actress	Helena Bonham Carter	Won
TFCA Award	13 January 1998	Best Actress	Helena Bonham Carter	Won
USC Scripter Award	8 March 1998		Henry James (author), Hossein Amini (screenwriter)	Nominated
Writers Guild of America Award	21 February 1998	Best Adapted Screenplay	Hossein Amini	Nominated

== Home media ==
In the United States, a VHS was released on June 16, 1998 by Buena Vista Home Entertainment (under the Miramax Home Entertainment banner). A DVD from Buena Vista Home Entertainment followed in 1999. The film also received a U.S. LaserDisc release on August 19, 1998, with a Hong Kong LaserDisc being released at an undetermined date.

In 2010, Miramax was sold by The Walt Disney Company, their owners since 1993. That same year, the studio was taken over by private equity firm Filmyard Holdings. Filmyard licensed the home media rights for several Miramax titles to Lionsgate, and on January 6, 2012, Lionsgate Home Entertainment released The Wings of the Dove on Blu-ray. In 2011, Filmyard Holdings licensed the Miramax library to streamer Netflix. This deal included The Wings of the Dove, and ran for five years, eventually ending on June 1, 2016.

Filmyard Holdings sold Miramax to Qatari company beIN Media Group during March 2016. In April 2020, ViacomCBS (now known as Paramount Skydance) acquired the rights to Miramax's library, after buying a 49% stake in the studio from beIN. The Wings of the Dove was one of the 700 titles they acquired in the deal, and since April 2020, the film has been distributed by Paramount Pictures. Paramount Home Entertainment reissued the film on Blu-ray in Japan in 2021, with this being one of many Miramax titles that they reissued around this time. Paramount also made the film available on their subscription streaming service Paramount+, as well as on their free streaming service Pluto TV.
