= The Sweet Hereafter (film) =

1997 film

- Theatrical release poster
- Directed by: Atom Egoyan
- Screenplay by: Atom Egoyan
- Based on: The Sweet Hereafter by Russell Banks
- Produced by: Atom Egoyan; Camelia Frieberg
- Starring: Ian Holm; Maury Chaykin; Peter Donaldson; Bruce Greenwood; David Hemblen; Brooke Johnson; Arsinée Khanjian; Tom McCamus; Stephanie Morgenstern; Earl Pastko; Sarah Polley; Gabrielle Rose; Alberta Watson
- Cinematography: Paul Sarossy
- Edited by: Susan Shipton
- Music by: Mychael Danna, Toronto Consort
- Production company: Ego Film Arts
- Distributed by: Alliance Releasing
- Release dates: 14 May 1997 (Cannes); 10 October 1997 (Canada)
- Running time: 112 minutes
- Country: Canada
- Language: English
- Budget: $5 million
- Box office: $3.3 million

The Sweet Hereafter is a 1997 Canadian drama film written and directed by Atom Egoyan, adapted from the 1991 novel of the same name by Russell Banks. It tells the story of a school bus accident in a small town that kills 14 children; survivors and grieving parents file a class-action lawsuit, which proves divisive in the community and becomes tied with personal and family issues. The ensemble cast includes Ian Holm, Sarah Polley, Maury Chaykin, Bruce Greenwood, Tom McCamus, Gabrielle Rose, Arsinée Khanjian and Alberta Watson.

While the book was set in a small town in upstate New York, the film was set in a Canadian town, and was filmed in British Columbia and Ontario. The film score had medieval music influences and references to the story of the Pied Piper of Hamelin.

Although The Sweet Hereafter was not a box office success, it was critically acclaimed and won three awards, including the Grand Prix, at the 1997 Cannes Film Festival, along with seven Genie Awards, including Best Motion Picture. It also received two Academy Award nominations, for Best Director and Best Adapted Screenplay. Toronto International Film Festival critics ranked The Sweet Hereafter as one of the top 10 Canadian films.

== Plot ==
In the small town of Sam Dent, British Columbia, a school bus hits a patch of ice, runs through a barrier, and crashes into a lake, killing 14 children. The grieving parents are approached by an out-of-town lawyer, Mitchell Stephens, who is haunted by his dysfunctional relationship with his drug-addicted daughter. Stephens persuades the reluctant parents and bus driver Dolores Driscoll to file a class-action lawsuit against the town and bus company for damages, arguing that the accident is a result of negligence in constructing the barrier or the bus.

The case depends on coaching the few surviving witnesses to say the right things in court, particularly Nicole Burnell, a 15-year-old paralyzed from the waist down as a result of the accident. Before the accident, Nicole was an aspiring musician and was being sexually abused by her father, Sam.

One bereft parent, Billy Ansel, distrusts Stephens and pressures Sam to drop the case; Nicole overhears their argument. In the pretrial deposition, Nicole unexpectedly states that Dolores was speeding, going 72 miles per hour (116 km/h), far beyond the actual speed shown in an earlier scene, but nonetheless halting the lawsuit. Stephens and Sam know she is lying but can do nothing. Two years later, Stephens sees Dolores working as a bus driver in a city.

== Cast ==
- Ian Holm as Mitchell Stephens
  - James D. Watts as young Mitchell
- Sarah Polley as Nicole Burnell
- Bruce Greenwood as Billy Ansel
- Tom McCamus as Sam Burnell
- Alberta Watson as Risa Walker
- Arsinée Khanjian as Wanda Otto
- Gabrielle Rose as Dolores Driscoll
- Maury Chaykin as Wendell Walker
- David Hemblen as Abbott Driscoll
- Earl Pastko as Hartley Otto
- Peter Donaldson as Schwartz
- Brooke Johnson as Mary Burnell
- Stephanie Morgenstern as Allison O'Donnell
- Caerthan Banks as Zoe Stephens
  - Magdalena Sokoloski as young Zoe
- Simon R. Baker as Bear Otto
- Sarah Rosen Fruitman as Jessica Ansel
- Marc Donato as Mason Ansel
- Devon Finn as Sean Walker
- Fides Krucker as Klara Stephens
- Allegra Denton as Jenny Burnell
- Kirsten Kieferle as Stewardess
- Russell Banks as Dr. Robeson
- Mychael Danna as harmonium player

== Production ==
=== Adaptation ===
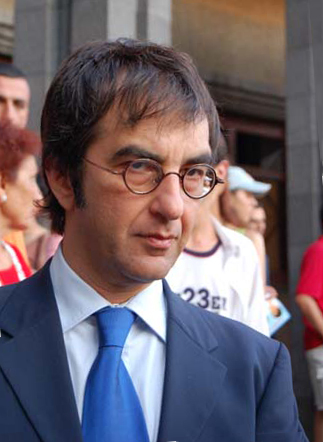
Director Atom Egoyan adapted Russell Banks' novel The Sweet Hereafter and incorporated The Pied Piper of Hamelin.

The Canadian director Atom Egoyan adapted the screenplay after his wife, the actress Arsinée Khanjian, suggested he read Russell Banks' The Sweet Hereafter. The novel is inspired by an incident in Alton, Texas, in 1989, in which a bus crash killed 21 students, leading to multiple lawsuits. Egoyan found it challenging to acquire the rights, as they had been optioned to another studio that was not actually producing it. Shortly before the option expired, novelist Margaret Atwood suggested to Egoyan that he meet with Banks personally after the director's success with the film Exotica (1994), and Banks was willing to grant him the rights. Egoyan later stated he was drawn to filming the novel because he felt film is for "confronting the most extreme things." As an Armenian Canadian, he also saw the story as a metaphor for the Armenian genocide, in which those guilty had not accepted responsibility.

In adapting the novel, Egoyan changed the setting from Upstate New York to British Columbia, to help secure Canadian funding. He also added references to the story of The Pied Piper of Hamelin by Robert Browning, to emphasize how Egoyan saw The Sweet Hereafter as a "grim fairy tale." Nicole is seen reading The Pied Piper to children who later die in the accident. In that story, the Pied Piper leads all the children away, never to return, after their parents refuse to honour their debt to him. Egoyan wrote a new stanza in the Pied Piper style for the scene in which Nicole testifies Dolores was speeding, in which she describes her father's lips as "frozen as the winter moon." Egoyan also made Mitchell Stephens the main character and increased the importance of Stephens' daughter, and moved the revelation of incest between the Burnells to later in the film.

=== Filming ===
The film was shot in British Columbia (Merritt and Spences Bridge) and Ontario (Toronto and Stouffville), on a budget of $5 million. Funding came from the company Alliance Communications. Egoyan assembled many Canadian actors he had worked with in prior films, including Bruce Greenwood, Gabrielle Rose and Sarah Polley. Egoyan explained the benefit of working with a familiar cast, saying "When you're working on a limited production schedule, it's a comfort to know that you know the personalities involved, you know what they need as opposed to having to discover that and be surprised by that."

Ian Holm was cast as Mitchell Stephens after the actor originally set to play the character, Donald Sutherland, quit the project. In casting the part, Egoyan was inspired by Holm's "strangely compassionate, yet furtive and menacing" performance in The Homecoming (1973). Holm explained why he accepted the role, saying, "It's not often you get offered a leading role at age 65... This is my first in a movie," and afterwards said the film is "very touching" and "a masterpiece". Holm called his part challenging, as it was his first lead, but he found Egoyan and the Canadian actors to be great to work with.

=== Music ===
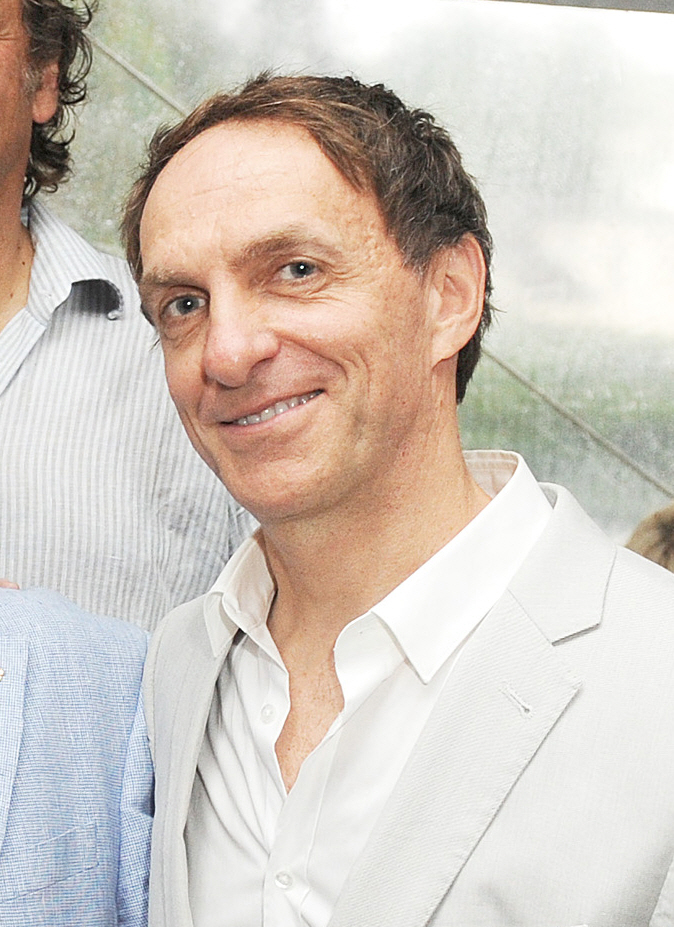
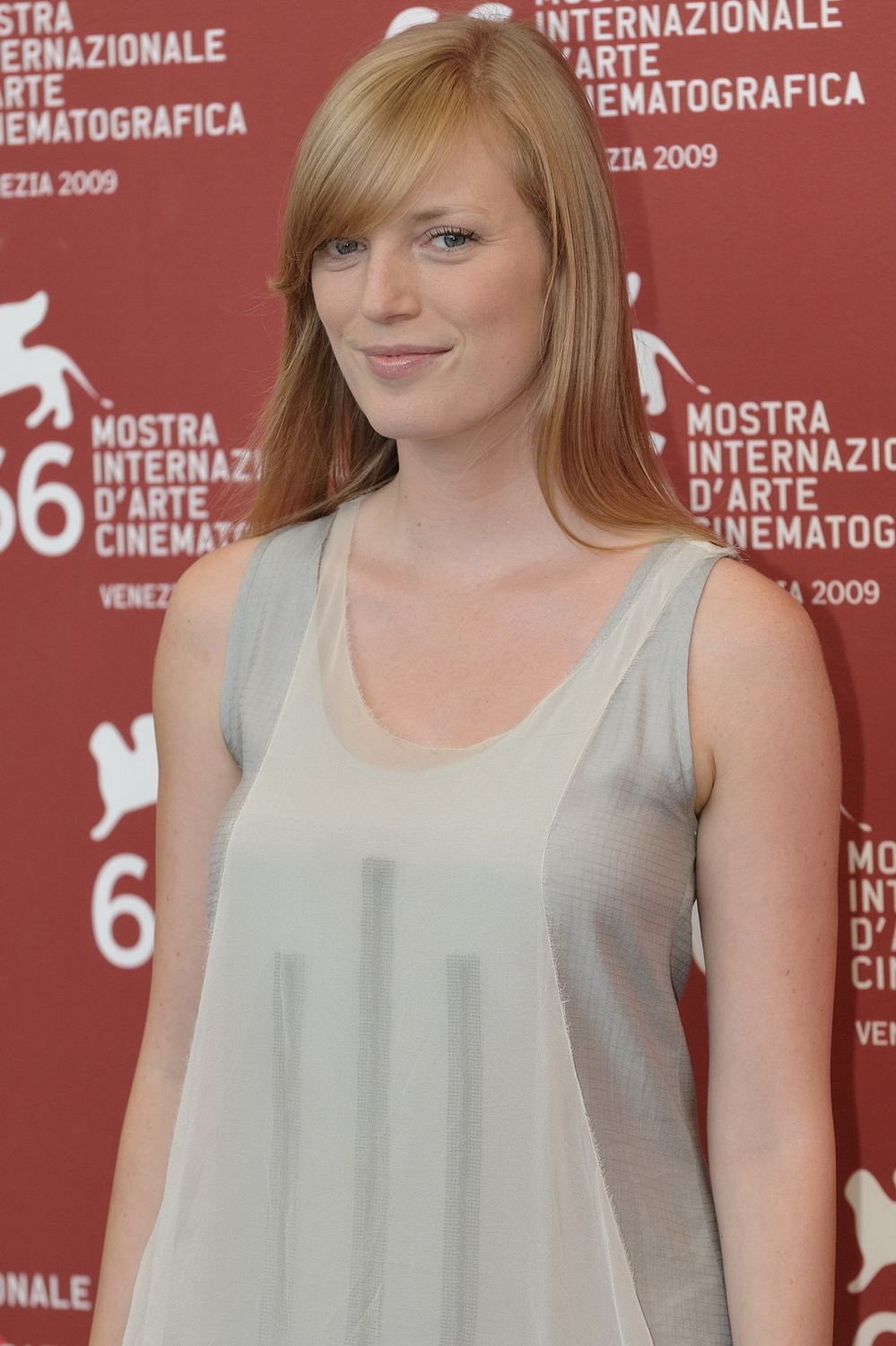
Mychael Danna, left, arranged popular Canadian songs which actress Sarah Polley performed, and the two worked together to create original songs.

The Pied Piper references influenced the composer Mychael Danna's music, which uses a Persian ney flute along with old instruments such as recorders, crumhorns and lutes, creating "a pseudo-medieval score" which was performed by the Toronto Consort, conducted by David Fallis. The score thus combined Danna's interests in old and exotic music. Egoyan stated medieval-style music was used to make the film feel timeless, evoking Brothers Grimm fairy tales and avoiding the feel of a TV movie.

Polley's character, Nicole, is an aspiring singer before the accident, and is seen on stage performing Jane Siberry's "One More Colour." Danna and Polley cooperated to create Nicole's music, with Polley writing lyrics to Danna's original songs and Danna arranging the adaptations of "Courage" and "One More Colour". The songs were chosen because of their domestic popularity, reinforcing the local nature of Nicole's music. The Tragically Hip's original version of "Courage" also appears in the film.

== Release ==
The film debuted at the Cannes Film Festival in May 1997, and went on to play at the Toronto International Film Festival, Telluride Film Festival, New York Film Festival and Valladolid International Film Festival. In Canada, the film was distributed by Alliance Communications on October 10, 1997. Following its screening at Cannes, Fine Line Features secured rights for the film for distribution in the United States, releasing it there on November 21, 1997.

In Region 1, The Sweet Hereafter was released on DVD in May 1998. In Canada, the film had a Blu-ray release in June 2012, with special features, including interviews.

In 2023, Telefilm Canada announced that the film was one of 23 titles that will be digitally restored under its new Canadian Cinema Reignited program to preserve classic Canadian films.

== Reception ==
=== Box office ===
By the spring of 1998, The Sweet Hereafter had grossed $1 million domestically. According to The Numbers, The Sweet Hereafter grossed $4,306,697 in North America and $3,644,550 in other territories, for a worldwide total of $7,951,247. Although Canadian historian George Melnyk said the film achieved "mainstream popularity", another Canadian historian, Reginald C. Stuart, said that the film "aimed for, but did not reach, a mass audience." Dan Webster of The Spokesman-Review concluded that "despite generally good reviews", the film "never attracted much box-office attention."

The Writers Guild of Canada commented that The Sweet Hereafter and contemporary Canadian films "never succeeded in scoring a home run at the international box office." Melnyk suggested Egoyan's previous film Exotica performed better at the box office than The Sweet Hereafter because of Exotica's "sexual content ... rather than the early film's artistic merit."

=== Critical reception ===
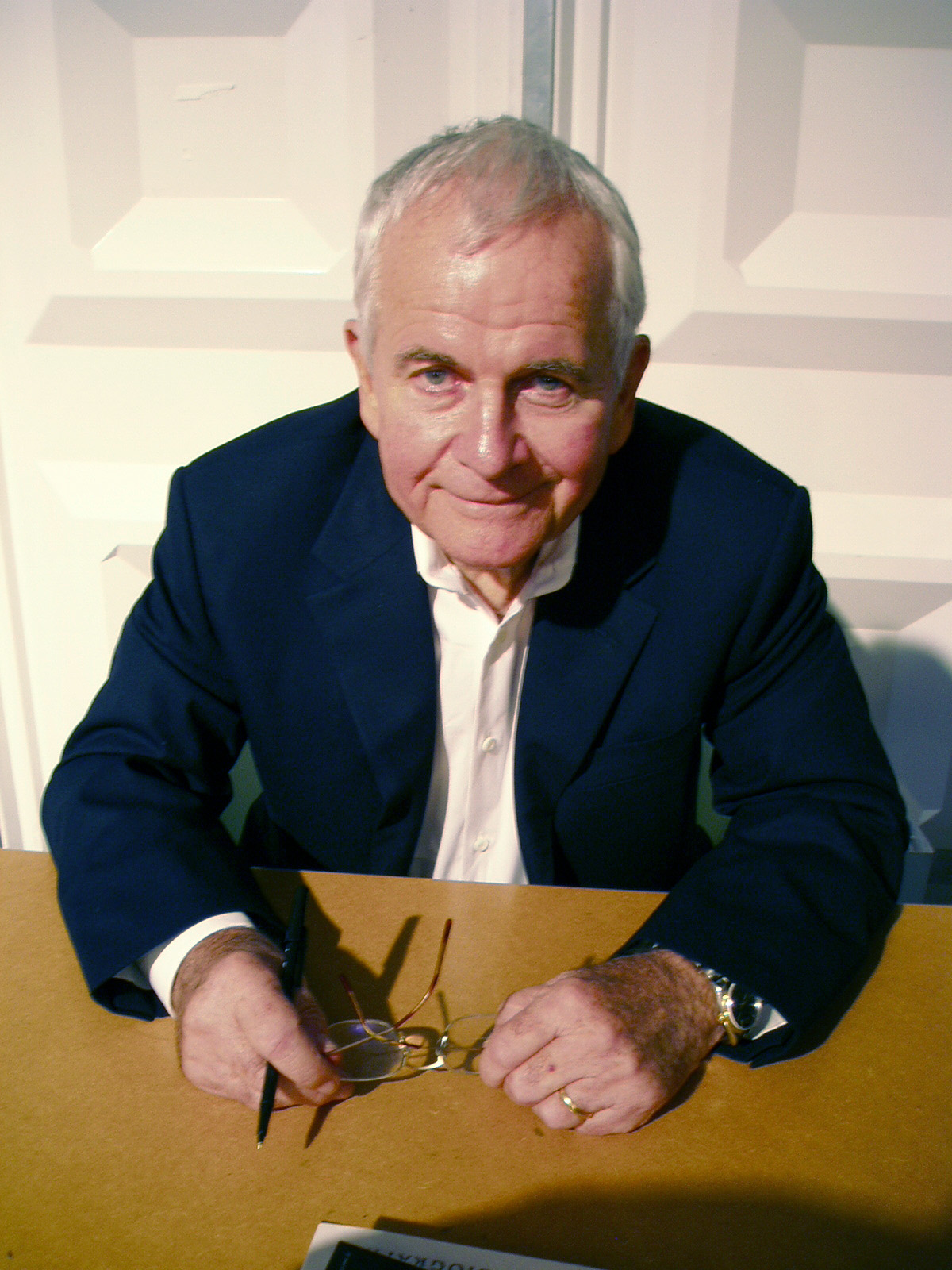
Ian Holm received critical praise for his performance in the film and won the Genie Award for Best Actor.

On the review aggregator website Rotten Tomatoes, 98% of 61 critics' reviews are positive. The website's consensus reads: "Director Atom Egoyan examines tragedy and its aftermath with intelligence and empathy." On Metacritic, the film has a weighted average score of 91 out of 100, based on 23 critics, indicating "universal acclaim". In 2002, readers of Playback voted it the greatest Canadian film ever made. In 2004, the Toronto International Film Festival ranked it third in the Top 10 Canadian Films of All Time, tied with Goin' Down the Road, and in 2015, it was the sole film in the third spot.

Roger Ebert gave the film four stars, calling it "one of the best films of the year, an unflinching lament for the human condition." Janet Maslin, writing for The New York Times, said "this fusion of Mr. Banks's and Mr. Egoyan's sensibilities stands as a particularly inspired mix", with Sarah Polley and Bruce Greenwood "particularly good here". Brendan Kelly of Variety praised The Sweet Hereafter as "Egoyan's most ambitious work to date", and as "a rich, complex meditation on the impact of a terrible tragedy on a small town", adding Polley and Tom McCamus are "excellent".

Entertainment Weekly gave the film an A, saying it "puts you in a rapturous emotional daze", and calling it a "hymn to the agony of loss" and "a new kind of mystical fairy tale, one that seeks to uncover the forces holding the world together, even as they tear it apart." Paul Tatara of CNN called The Sweet Hereafter "devastating" and wrote Ian Holm gives "the performance of his hugely impressive career." David Denby of New York magazine said that the film had "Ian Holm's greatest role in the movies" and the cast are "all excellent". The film made over 250 critics' Top 10 lists for the best films of 1997.

In 2001, an industry poll conducted by Playback named it the best Canadian film of the preceding 15 years.

In 2004, Slovenian critic Slavoj Žižek called The Sweet Hereafter "arguably the film about the impact of trauma on a community." That year, The New York Times also included the film on its list of "the Best 1,000 Movies Ever Made". In 2011, British director Clio Barnard praised the "real depth" and "healthy ambiguity" of the story and described Holm and Polley as "brilliant", giving "powerful, subtle performances". One year later, The A.V. Club named The Sweet Hereafter the 22nd best film of the 1990s, praising it as a "masterpiece of adaptation".

=== Accolades ===
The Sweet Hereafter won three awards at the 1997 Cannes Film Festival: the FIPRESCI Prize, the Grand Prize of the Jury, and the Prize of the Ecumenical Jury. This was the highest honour won at Cannes for a Canadian film and made Egoyan the first Canadian to win the Grand Prix, followed by Xavier Dolan with It's Only the End of the World in 2016.

The Sweet Hereafter also won Best Motion Picture, Best Director, Best Cinematography, Best Actor for Holm, and three other prizes, at the 18th Genie Awards. It was nominated for Best Director and Best Adapted Screenplay at the 70th Academy Awards, but lost to Titanic and L.A. Confidential, respectively.

Award	Date of ceremony	Category	Recipient(s)	Result	Ref(s)
Academy Awards	23 March 1998	Best Director	Atom Egoyan	Nominated	
Academy Awards	23 March 1998	Best Adapted Screenplay	Atom Egoyan	Nominated	
Atlantic Film Festival	19–27 September 1997	Best Canadian Film or Video Over 60 Minutes	Atom Egoyan	Won (Note: Tied with The Hanging Garden)	
Boston Society of Film Critics	14 December 1997	Best Supporting Actress	Sarah Polley	Won	
Canadian Society of Cinematographers Awards	29 March 1998	Best Cinematography in Theatrical Feature	Paul Sarossy	Won	
Cannes Film Festival	7–18 May 1997	Grand Prize of the Jury	Atom Egoyan	Won	
Cannes Film Festival	7–18 May 1997	FIPRESCI Prize	Atom Egoyan	Won	
Cannes Film Festival	7–18 May 1997	Prize of the Ecumenical Jury	Atom Egoyan	Won	
Chicago Film Critics Association	1 March 1998	Best Film	Atom Egoyan	Nominated	
Chicago Film Critics Association	1 March 1998	Best Director	Atom Egoyan	Nominated	
Chicago Film Critics Association	1 March 1998	Best Screenplay	Atom Egoyan	Nominated	
Chicago Film Critics Association	1 March 1998	Best Original Score	Mychael Danna	Nominated	
Chicago Film Critics Association	1 March 1998	Best Actor	Ian Holm	Nominated	
Chicago Film Critics Association	1 March 1998	Best Supporting Actress	Sarah Polley	Nominated	
Chicago Film Critics Association	1 March 1998	Most Promising Actress	Sarah Polley	Nominated	
Genie Awards	14 December 1997	Best Motion Picture	Atom Egoyan and Camelia Frieberg	Won	
Genie Awards	14 December 1997	Best Direction	Atom Egoyan	Won	
Genie Awards	14 December 1997	Best Actor	Ian Holm	Won	
Genie Awards	14 December 1997	Best Actress	Sarah Polley	Nominated	
Genie Awards	14 December 1997	Best Actress	Gabrielle Rose	Nominated	
Genie Awards	14 December 1997	Best Supporting Actor	Tom McCamus	Nominated	
Genie Awards	14 December 1997	Best Screenplay	Atom Egoyan	Nominated	
Genie Awards	14 December 1997	Best Art Direction	Phillip Barker and Patricia Cuccia	Nominated	
Genie Awards	14 December 1997	Best Cinematography	Paul Sarossy	Won	
Genie Awards	14 December 1997	Best Costume Design	Beth Pasternak	Nominated	
Genie Awards	14 December 1997	Best Editing	Susan Shipton	Nominated	
Genie Awards	14 December 1997	Best Sound	Daniel Pellerin, Keith Elliott, Peter Kelly and Ross Redfern	Won	
Genie Awards	14 December 1997	Best Sound Editing	Steve Munro, Sue Conley, Goro Koyama, Andy Malcolm and David Drainie Taylor	Won	
Genie Awards	14 December 1997	Best Original Score	Mychael Danna	Won	
Genie Awards	14 December 1997	Best Original Song	"The Sweet Hereafter", Mychael Danna and Sarah Polley	Nominated	
Independent Spirit Awards	21 March 1998	Best Foreign Film	Atom Egoyan	Won	
Los Angeles Film Critics Association	December 1997	Best Picture	Atom Egoyan	Runner-up	
Los Angeles Film Critics Association	December 1997	Best Director	Atom Egoyan	Runner-up	
Los Angeles Film Critics Association	December 1997	Best Cinematography	Paul Sarossy	Runner-up	
National Board of Review	9 February 1998	Best Acting by an Ensemble	Cast	Won	
National Board of Review	9 February 1998	Top Ten Films	Atom Egoyan	Won	
New York Film Critics Circle	4 January 1998	Best Film	Atom Egoyan	Runner-up	
New York Film Critics Circle	4 January 1998	Best Director	Atom Egoyan	Runner-up	
New York Film Critics Circle	4 January 1998	Best Actor	Ian Holm	Runner-up	
Society of Texas Film Critics	29 December 1997	Best Film	Atom Egoyan	Won	
Toronto Film Critics Association	13 January 1998	Best Film	Atom Egoyan	Won	
Toronto Film Critics Association	13 January 1998	Best Director	Atom Egoyan	Won	
Toronto Film Critics Association	13 January 1998	Best Canadian Film	Atom Egoyan	Won	
Toronto Film Critics Association	13 January 1998	Best Actor	Ian Holm	Won	
Toronto Film Critics Association	13 January 1998	Best Actress	Sarah Polley	Runner-up	
Toronto International Film Festival	4–13 September 1997	Best Canadian Feature Film	Atom Egoyan	Won	
Writers Guild of Canada	1997	WGC Award	Atom Egoyan	Won	
