= Toronto Film Critics Association Award for Best Actress =

Canadian film award

The Toronto Film Critics Association Award for Best Actress was one of the annual awards given by the Toronto Film Critics Association.

== Winners ==
=== 1990s ===
Year	Winner	Film	Role	Ref
1997	Helena Bonham Carter	The Wings of the Dove	Kate Croy	
1997	Sarah Polley	The Sweet Hereafter	Nicole Burnell	
1998	Cate Blanchett	Elizabeth	Queen Elizabeth I	
1998	Pascale Bussières	August 32nd on Earth (Un 32 août sur terre)	Simone Prévost	
1998	Christina Ricci	The Opposite of Sex	Dedee Truitt	
1999	Hilary Swank	Boys Don't Cry	Brandon Teena	
1999	Cecilia Roth	All About My Mother	Manuela Echevarria	

=== 2000s ===
Year	Winner	Film	Role	Ref
2000	Laura Linney	You Can Count on Me	Samantha "Sammy" Prescott	
2000	Michelle Yeoh	Crouching Tiger, Hidden Dragon (Wo hu cang long)	Yu Shu Lien	
2001	Thora Birch	Ghost World	Enid	
2001	Gillian Anderson	The House of Mirth	Lily Bart	
2001	Tilda Swinton	The Deep End	Margaret Hall	
2002	Julianne Moore	Far from Heaven	Cathy Whitaker	
2002	Maggie Gyllenhall	Secretary	Lee Holloway	
2002	Isabelle Huppert	The Piano Teacher	Erika Kohut	
2003	Samantha Morton	Morvern Callar	Morvern Callar	
2004	Imelda Staunton	Vera Drake	Vera Drake	
2005	Laura Linney	The Squid and the Whale	Joan Berkman	
2006	Helen Mirren	The Queen	Queen Elizabeth II	
2006	Penélope Cruz	Volver	Raimunda	
2006	Judi Dench	Notes on a Scandal	Barbara Covett	
2007	Julie Christie	Away from Her	Fiona Anderson	
2007	Elliot Page (Note: Credited as Ellen Page)	Juno	Juno MacGuff	
2007	Laura Dern	Inland Empire	Nikki Grace / Susan Blue	
2008	Michelle Williams	Wendy and Lucy	Wendy	
2008	Anne Hathaway	Rachel Getting Married	Kym	
2008	Meryl Streep	Doubt	Aloysius Beauvier	
2009	Carey Mulligan	An Education	Jenny	
2009	Arta Dobroshi	Lorna's Silence (Le silence de Lorna)	Lorna	
2009	Meryl Streep	Julie & Julia	Julia Child	

=== 2010s ===
Year	Winner	Film	Role	Ref
2010	Jennifer Lawrence	Winter's Bone	Ree Dolly	
2010	Natalie Portman	Black Swan	Nina Sayers	
2010	Michelle Williams	Blue Valentine	Cindy Heller	
2011	Michelle Williams	My Week with Marilyn	Marilyn Monroe	
2011	Elizabeth Olsen	Martha Marcy May Marlene	Martha	
2011	Meryl Streep	The Iron Lady	Margaret Thatcher	
2012	Rachel Weisz	The Deep Blue Sea	Hester Collyer	
2012	Jessica Chastain	Zero Dark Thirty	Maya	
2012	Emmanuelle Riva	Amour	Anne Laurent	
2013	Cate Blanchett	Blue Jasmine	Jeanette "Jasmine" Francis	
2013	Julie Delpy	Before Midnight	Céline Wallace	
2013	Greta Gerwig	Frances Ha	Frances Halliday	
2014	Marion Cotillard	The Immigrant	Ewa Cybulska	
2014	Julianne Moore	Still Alice	Alice Howland	
2014	Reese Witherspoon	Wild	Cheryl Strayed	
2015	Nina Hoss	Phoenix	Nelly Lenz	
2015	Cate Blanchett	Carol	Carol Aird	
2015	Brie Larson	Room	Joy "Ma" Newsome	
2016	Sandra Hüller	Toni Erdmann	Ines Conradi	
2016	Rebecca Hall	Christine	Christine Chubbuck	
2016	Isabelle Huppert	Elle	Michèle Leblanc	
2016	Natalie Portman	Jackie	Jackie Kennedy	
2017	Frances McDormand	Three Billboards Outside Ebbing, Missouri	Mildred Hayes	
2017	Sally Hawkins	The Shape of Water	Elisa Esposito	
2017	Saoirse Ronan	Lady Bird	Christine "Lady Bird" McPherson	
2018	Olivia Colman	The Favourite	Anne, Queen of Great Britain	
2018	Regina Hall	Support the Girls	Lisa Conroy	
2018	Melissa McCarthy	Can You Ever Forgive Me?	Lee Israel	
2019	Lupita Nyong'o	Us	Adelaide Wilson / Red	
2019	Scarlett Johansson	Marriage Story	Nicole Barber	
2019	Renée Zellweger	Judy	Judy Garland	

=== 2020s ===
Year	Winner	Film	Role	Ref
2020	Frances McDormand	Nomadland	Fern	
2020	Viola Davis	Ma Rainey's Black Bottom	Ma Rainey	
2020	Sidney Flanigan	Never Rarely Sometimes Always	Autumn Callahan	
2021	Olivia Colman	The Lost Daughter	Leda Caruso	
2021	Penélope Cruz	Parallel Mothers	Janis Martinez	
2021	Kristen Stewart	Spencer	Diana, Princess of Wales	
2022	Cate Blanchett	Tár	Lydia Tár	
2022	Danielle Deadwyler	Till	Mamie Till	
2022	Michelle Yeoh	Everything Everywhere All at Once	Evelyn Quan Wang	
