= London Film Critics Circle Awards 1997 =

British film awards ceremony

18th London Film Critics Circle Awards

5 March 1998

Film of the Year:
L.A. Confidential

British Film of the Year:
The Full Monty

The 18th London Film Critics Circle Awards, honouring the best in film for 1997, were announced by the London Film Critics Circle on 5 March 1998.

== Winners ==
Film of the Year

- L.A. Confidential

British Film of the Year

- The Full Monty

Foreign Language Film of the Year

- Ridicule • France

Director of the Year

- Curtis Hanson – L.A. Confidential

British Director of the Year

- Anthony Minghella – The English Patient

Screenwriter of the Year

- Brian Helgeland and Curtis Hanson – L.A. Confidential

British Screenwriter of the Year

- Simon Beaufoy – The Full Monty

Actor of the Year

- Geoffrey Rush – Shine

Actress of the Year

- Claire Danes – William Shakespeare's Romeo + Juliet

British Actor of the Year

- Robert Carlyle – The Full Monty, Face and Carla's Song

British Actress of the Year

- Judi Dench – Mrs. Brown

British Supporting Actor of the Year

- Rupert Everett – My Best Friend's Wedding

British Supporting Actress of the Year

- Minnie Driver – Grosse Pointe Blank, Big Night, Sleepers

British Newcomer of the Year

- Peter Cattaneo – The Full Monty

British Producer of the Year

- Uberto Pasolini – The Full Monty and Palookaville

Special Achievement Award

- Woody Allen
- Kevin Spacey

Dilys Powell Award

- Michael Caine

Lifetime Achievement Award

- Paul Scofield
- Martin Scorsese
