= Society of Texas Film Critics Awards 1997 =

US film awards ceremony in 1997

4th Society of Texas Film Critics Awards
- Date: December 29, 1997
- Location: San Antonio, Texas
- Country: United States
- Presented by: Society of Texas Film Critics

The 4th Society of Texas Film Critics Awards were given by the Society of Texas Film Critics (STFC) on December 29, 1997. Founded in 1994, the Society of Texas Film Critics members included film critics working for print and broadcast outlets across the state of Texas.

== Winners ==
- Best Film:
  - The Sweet Hereafter
- Best Director:
  - Atom Egoyan – The Sweet Hereafter
- Best Actor:
  - Robert Duvall – The Apostle
- Best Actress:
  - Helena Bonham Carter – The Wings of the Dove
- Best Supporting Actor:
  - Kevin Spacey – L.A. Confidential and Midnight in the Garden of Good and Evil
- Best Supporting Actress:
  - Joan Cusack – In & Out
- Best Original Screenplay:
  - In the Company of Men – Neil LaBute
- Best Adapted Screenplay:
  - L.A. Confidential – Brian Helgeland and Curtis Hanson
- Best Foreign Language Film:
  - Shall We Dance? (Shall we dansu?) – Japan
- Best Documentary Feature:
  - Fast, Cheap & Out of Control
