= The Apostle =

- Theatrical release poster
- Directed by: Robert Duvall
- Written by: Robert Duvall
- Produced by: Steven Brown; Rob Carliner
- Starring: Robert Duvall; Farrah Fawcett; Billy Bob Thornton; June Carter Cash; Miranda Richardson
- Cinematography: Barry Markowitz
- Edited by: Stephen Mack
- Music by: David Mansfield
- Production company: Butcher's Run Films
- Distributed by: October Films
- Release dates: September 6, 1997 (TIFF); December 19, 1997 (United States)
- Running time: 134 minutes
- Country: United States
- Language: English
- Budget: $5 million
- Box office: $21.3 million

The Apostle is a 1997 American independent Southern Gothic drama film written and directed by Robert Duvall, who stars in the title role. John Beasley, Farrah Fawcett, Walton Goggins, Billy Bob Thornton, June Carter Cash, Miranda Richardson, and Billy Joe Shaver also appear. It was filmed on location in and around Saint Martinville and Des Allemands, Louisiana with some establishing shots done in the Dallas, Texas area. The majority of the film was shot in the Louisiana areas of Sunset and Lafayette.

The film was screened in the Un Certain Regard section at the 1998 Cannes Film Festival. For his performance, Duvall was nominated for the Academy Award for Best Actor. The film won the Independent Spirit Award for Best Film for 1997.

== Plot ==
Euliss F. "Sonny" Dewey is a charismatic Pentecostal preacher in Texas. His wife Jessie has begun an adulterous relationship with a youth minister named Horace. She refuses Sonny's desire to reconcile, although she assures him that she will not interfere with his right to see his children. She has also conspired to use their church's bylaws to have him removed from power. Sonny asks God what to do but receives no answer. Much of the congregation sides with Jessie in this dispute. Sonny, however, refuses to start a new church, insisting that the one which forced him out was "his" church. At his children's Bible-camp softball game, Sonny, in an emotional fit, attacks Horace with a bat and puts him into a coma; Horace later dies.

A fleeing Sonny ditches his car in a river and gets rid of all identifying information. After destroying all evidence of his past, Sonny rebaptizes himself and anoints himself as "The Apostle E. F." He leaves Texas and ends up in the bayous of Louisiana, where he persuades a retired minister named Blackwell to help him start a new church. He works various odd jobs and uses the money to build the church, and to buy time to preach on a local radio station. Sonny also begins dating the station's receptionist.

With Sonny's energy and charisma, the church soon has a faithful and racially integrated flock. Sonny even succeeds in converting a racist construction worker who shows up at a church picnic intent on destruction. While at work in a local diner, Sonny sees his new girlfriend out in public with her husband and children, apparently reconciled. Sonny walks out, vowing never to return there.

Jessie hears a radio broadcast of the Apostle E. F. and recognizes his voice; she calls the police on Sonny. The police show up in the middle of an evening service but allow Sonny to finish it while they wait outside. In the poignant finale, Sonny delivers an impassioned sermon before telling his flock that he has to go. In the final scene, Sonny, now part of a chain gang, preaches to the inmates as they work along the side of a highway.

== Cast ==
- Robert Duvall as Euliss F. "Sonny" Dewey
- Farrah Fawcett as Jessie Dewey
- John Beasley as Brother C. Charles Blackwell
- Miranda Richardson as Toosie
- June Carter Cash as Momma Dewey
- Walton Goggins as Sam
- Billy Bob Thornton as Troublemaker
- Billy Joe Shaver as Joe
- Rick Dial as Elmo
- Todd Allen as Horace

== Production ==
=== Development ===
Making The Apostle had been a longtime passion project for Duvall, who first wrote the script in 1984, but could not find a studio willing to produce it. Duvall's interest in playing a preacher stemmed from an experience he had in the 1960s visiting a small Pentecostal chapel in Arkansas while doing research for an off-Broadway play. Said Duvall, "There was a certain simplicity and understanding. And also the feeling of the folklore. Preaching is one of the great American art forms. The rhythm, the cadence. And nobody knows about it except the preachers themselves." After finding no interest from studios, he eventually decided to direct and finance the film himself.

=== Filming ===
The film was primarily shot in western Louisiana over a period of seven weeks in the fall of 1996. The fictional town of Bayou Boutte is actually Sunset, Louisiana. Some members of the supporting cast were actual churchgoers from the area.

== Release ==
The film was first screened at the Toronto International Film Festival on September 6, 1997. In the middle of the screening, studio executives began leaving the theater to bid for distribution rights. October Films won the bidding war and gained the distribution rights that night.

The Apostle opened in limited release in North American theaters on December 19, 1997, eventually expanding nationwide through February and March 1998. It went on to gross $21.3 million worldwide, against a production budget of $5 million.

== Soundtrack ==
The Apostle: Music from and Inspired by the Motion Picture

Soundtrack album by various
- Released: February 10, 1998
- Genres: Country; Contemporary Christian; Southern Gospel
- Length: 50:30
- Label: Rising Tide
- Producers: Robert Duvall; Scott Greenstein

Professional ratings
Review scores
Source	Rating
AllMusic	3.5/5 stars

The score for The Apostle was scored by David Mansfield. Three songs, by country music artists Lyle Lovett, Patty Loveless, and contemporary Christian artist Steven Curtis Chapman, were recorded especially for the film. The song "There Ain't No Grave Gonna Hold My Body Down" was composed by Brother Claude Ely.

The soundtrack won the 1998 Grammy Award for Best Southern, Country, or Bluegrass Gospel Album.

The songs, "I Will Not Go Quietly" by Chapman, "Two Coats" by Loveless and "I'm a Soldier in the Army of the Lord" by Lovett were released on a soundtrack album that was supplemented with more exclusive songs "inspired by" (but not included in) the film.

=== Track listing ===
No.	Title	Length
1.	"I Will Not Go Quietly" (Steven Curtis Chapman)	3:46
2.	"Two Coats" (Patty Loveless)	3:21
3.	"I'm a Soldier in the Army of the Lord" (Lyle Lovett)	3:29
4.	"Softly and Tenderly" (Rebecca Lynn Howard)	3:05
5.	"There Is a River" (Gaither Vocal Band)	4:24
6.	"In the Garden" (Johnny Cash)	3:16
7.	"I Love to Tell the Story" (Emmylou Harris and Robert Duvall)	3:45
8.	"Waitin' on the Far Side Banks of Jordan" (Carter Family)	3:15
9.	"Victory Is Mine" (Sounds of Blackness)	3:32
10.	"There is Power in the Blood" (Lari White)	5:19
11.	"There Ain't No Grave Gonna Hold My Body Down" (Russ Taff)	4:54
12.	"I'll Fly Away" (Gary Chapman and Wynonna Judd)	3:47
13.	"Soft and Tenderly (Reprise)" (Dino Kartsonakis)	4:37
Total length:		50:30

=== Chart performance ===
Chart (1998)	Peak position
U.S. Billboard Top Christian Albums	4
U.S. Billboard Top Country Albums	21
U.S. Billboard 200	175

== Reception ==
The film has an 88% approval rating on the review aggregator Rotten Tomatoes, based on 51 reviews, with an average score of 8/10. The consensus summarizes: "A nuanced sermon on the contradictions of faith as well as a blistering showcase for its director and star, The Apostle will leave audiences evangelizing the immensity of Robert Duvall's talent." Metacritic, which uses a weighted average, assigned the film a score of 83 out of 100, based on 28 critics, indicating "universal acclaim".

Critic Roger Ebert gave it four out of four stars and called the film "a lesson in how movies can escape from convention and penetrate the hearts of rare characters." Lisa Schwarzbaum of Entertainment Weekly gave the film an A− grade and described it as "a seamless match of strong artistic vision and physical performance", with "the Oscar-winning star of Tender Mercies [drawing] on more than three decades of experience personifying the hard contours and bruised souls of American men to create a fearless and fascinating piece of work."

American theologian Harvey Cox said, "It's the most explicit treatment of evangelical religious sensibility I've seen. One is stunned by Duvall's performance. But beyond that, it is a film about sin and redemption, something Dostoevskian, deeply theological, not churchy. It's in-your-face theology." The Christian Science Monitor noted how the film dealt with the subject of race as it "presents the Christian message as universal, extending to all races and classes."

== Awards and nominations ==
The Apostle garnered numerous awards and nominations from major awards organizations. At the 70th Academy Awards, Duvall was nominated for Best Actor. The film won the awards for Best Film, Best Male Lead, and Best Director at the 13th Independent Spirit Awards. Miranda Richardson and Farrah Fawcett were also both nominated for Best Supporting Female at the Independent Spirit Awards.

In addition, Duvall won the awards for Best Actor from the Chicago Film Critics Association, Florida Film Critics, Las Vegas Film Critics Society, Los Angeles Film Critics Association, New York Film Critics Circle, the National Society of Film Critics, Society of Texas Film Critics, and the Satellite Awards. Duvall was nominated for a Screen Actors Guild Award for Best Actor and an Un Certain Regard Award at the 1998 Cannes Film Festival.
