= Chicago Film Critics Association Awards 1997 =

Annual US film awards ceremony

10th CFCA Awards

March 1, 1998

Best Film:
L.A. Confidential

The 10th Chicago Film Critics Association Awards, given on 1 March 1998, honored the finest achievements in 1997 filmmaking. The ceremony was hosted by Irma P. Hall.

== Winners ==
- Best Actor:
  - Robert Duvall - The Apostle
- Best Actress:
  - Judi Dench - Mrs. Brown
- Best Cinematography:
  - Titanic - Russell Carpenter
- Best Director:
  - Curtis Hanson - L.A. Confidential
- Best Picture:
  - L.A. Confidential
- Best Foreign Language Film:
  - Shall we dansu? (Shall We Dance?), Japan
- Best Score:
  - "Titanic" - James Horner
- Best Supporting Actor:
  - Burt Reynolds - Boogie Nights
- Best Supporting Actress:
  - Debbi Morgan - Eve's Bayou
- Most Promising Actor:
  - Matt Damon - Good Will Hunting
- Most Promising Actress:
  - Joey Lauren Adams - Chasing Amy
- Commitment to Chicago Award:
  - John Mahoney
- Big Shoulders Awards:
  - Chicago's Kartemquin Films - Gordon Quinn and Jerry Blumenthal
