= Brian Helgeland =

American screenwriter (born 1961)

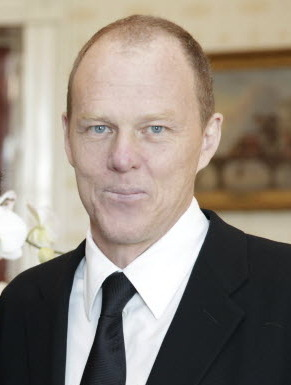
- Helgeland in 2013
- Born: Brian Thomas Helgeland; January 17, 1961 (age 65); Providence, Rhode Island, U.S.
- Education: University of Massachusetts Dartmouth; Loyola Marymount University
- Occupations: Screenwriter; director; producer
- Years active: 1988–present
- Notable work: L.A. Confidential; Mystic River
- Awards: Academy Award for Best Adapted Screenplay; L.A. Confidential (1997)

Brian Thomas Helgeland (born January 17, 1961) is an American screenwriter, film producer, and director. He is best known for writing the screenplays for the films L.A. Confidential (1997) and Mystic River (2003). He wrote and directed the films 42, a biopic of Jackie Robinson, and Legend, about the rise and fall of the infamous London gangsters, the Kray twins. His work on L.A. Confidential earned him an Academy Award for Best Adapted Screenplay.

== Early life ==
Helgeland was born in Providence, Rhode Island, to Norwegian immigrant Aud-Karin and second-generation Norwegian-American Thomas Helgeland. He was raised in nearby New Bedford, Massachusetts. He majored in English at University of Massachusetts Dartmouth before following his father's work in fishing scallop.

A particularly cold winter day in 1985 made Helgeland consider finding another job. He was fascinated by a book about film schools. With a love for movies, Helgeland decided to seek a career in film. He applied for the film school at Loyola Marymount University in Los Angeles, the only one to agree to accept him in mid-semester.

== Career ==
Helgeland's agent arranged a meeting for him with Rhet Topham, who had an idea for a horror comedy film but was having difficulty writing it. The duo completed 976-EVIL, which they sold for $12,000. 976-EVIL marked the directorial debut of actor Robert Englund, who had portrayed Freddy Krueger in films of that franchise (A Nightmare on Elm Street).

He recommended Helgeland to New Line Cinema representatives, who wanted to do a new A Nightmare on Elm Street film. Helgeland was paid $70,000 to write what was released as A Nightmare on Elm Street 4: The Dream Master. Both films were released in 1988, with The Dream Master hitting theaters earlier.

Helgeland earned $275,000 for his script for Highway to Hell, which was released in 1992. In 1990, Helgeland and Manny Coto sold a script, The Ticking Man, for $1 million, but the film was never made.

In 1998, Helgeland won an Academy Award for Best Adapted Screenplay for L.A. Confidential, which was based on the 1990 novel of the same name by James Ellroy. That year Helgeland also won a Razzie for The Postman, being one of only three people to have achieved this dubious feat (preceded by Alan Menken in 1993 and followed by Sandra Bullock in 2010). Helgeland accepted the Razzie, the fourth person to receive the statuette in person, which was delivered to him in his office at Warner Bros. He keeps the statues of both the Oscar and the Razzie on his mantle as "a reminder of Hollywood's idealistic nature and unrealistic expectations."

Helgeland answering questions about the film 42 in the State Dining Room, April 2013.

Helgeland wrote and directed the films Payback (1999), A Knight's Tale (2001), The Order (2003), 42 (2013), and Legend (2015). He has worked with director Clint Eastwood twice, in 2002 on Blood Work, and in 2003 on Mystic River, for which he was nominated for an Oscar for Best Adapted Screenplay. He also has written an as-yet-unproduced adaptation of Moby-Dick.

In 2004, Helgeland co-wrote the screenplay for The Bourne Supremacy, for which he was uncredited. In early 2008, he was attached to shape the script of the thriller Green Zone after screenwriter Tom Stoppard had to drop out. He collaborated with director Paul Greengrass, whom he worked with on The Bourne Supremacy, as well as reuniting with actor Matt Damon, who played Jason Bourne/David Webb.

Helgeland wrote the screenplay for the remake of The Taking of Pelham 123, replacing screenwriter David Koepp. The film was released on June 12, 2009.

On May 4, 2017, HBO announced that Helgeland was one of four writers working on a potential pilot for a Game of Thrones spin-off. In addition to Helgeland, Carly Wray, Max Borenstein, and Jane Goldman were also working on potential pilots. Helgeland has been working and communicating with George R. R. Martin, the author of A Song of Ice and Fire, the series of novels upon which the original series is based. Former Game of Thrones showrunners D. B. Weiss and David Benioff were said to be executive producers for whichever project is picked up by HBO.

In April 2026, Helgeland was announced to be scripting the western film Django/Zorro, based on the comic book of the same name, for Sony Pictures.

== Personal life ==
Helgeland and his wife Nancy have two sons.

== Filmography ==
=== Film ===
Year	Title	Director	Writer	Producer	Notes
1988	A Nightmare on Elm Street 4: The Dream Master	No	Yes	No	
1988	976-EVIL	No	Yes	No	
1992	Highway to Hell	No	Yes	Yes	
1995	Assassins	No	Yes	No	
1997	L.A. Confidential	No	Yes	No	Academy Award for Best Adapted Screenplay; Nominated - BAFTA Award for Best Adapted Screenplay; Nominated - Golden Globe Award for Best Screenplay
1997	Conspiracy Theory	No	Yes	No	
1997	The Postman	No	Yes	No	Golden Raspberry Award for Worst Screenplay
1999	Payback	Yes	Yes	No	
2001	A Knight's Tale	Yes	Yes	Yes	Also executive soundtrack producer
2002	Blood Work	No	Yes	No	
2003	Mystic River	No	Yes	No	Nominated - Academy Award for Best Adapted Screenplay; Nominated - BAFTA Award for Best Adapted Screenplay; Nominated - Golden Globe Award for Best Screenplay
2003	The Order	Yes	Yes	Yes	
2004	Man on Fire	No	Yes	No	
2009	The Taking of Pelham 123	No	Yes	No	
2009	Cirque du Freak: The Vampire's Assistant	No	Yes	No	
2010	Green Zone	No	Yes	No	
2010	Robin Hood	No	Yes	No	
2013	42	Yes	Yes	No	
2015	Legend	Yes	Yes	No	
2020	Spenser Confidential	No	Yes	No	
2023	Finestkind	Yes	Yes	No	
2024	The Killer	No	Yes	No	

=== Television ===
Year	Title	Director	Writer	Notes
1989–1990	Friday the 13th: The Series	No	Yes	Episodes: "Crippled Inside", "Mightier Than the Sword"
1996	Tales from the Crypt	Yes	Yes	Episode: "A Slight Case of Murder"

== Additional awards ==
Year	Title	Award	Result
1997	L.A. Confidential	Boston Society of Film Critics Award for Best Screenplay	Won
1997	L.A. Confidential	Broadcast Film Critics Association Award for Best Screenplay	Won
1997	L.A. Confidential	Chicago Film Critics Association Award for Best Screenplay	Won
1997	L.A. Confidential	Edgar Allan Poe Award for Best Motion Picture Screenplay	Won
1997	L.A. Confidential	Florida Film Critics Circle Award for Best Screenplay	Won
1997	L.A. Confidential	Las Vegas Film Critics Society Award for Best Screenplay	Won
1997	L.A. Confidential	London Critics Circle Film Award for Screenwriter of the Year	Won
1997	L.A. Confidential	Los Angeles Film Critics Association Award for Best Screenplay	Won
1997	L.A. Confidential	National Society of Film Critics Award for Best Screenplay	Won
1997	L.A. Confidential	New York Film Critics Circle Award for Best Screenplay	Won
1997	L.A. Confidential	Online Film Critics Society Award for Best Screenplay	Won
1997	L.A. Confidential	San Diego Film Critics Society Award for Best Adapted Screenplay	Won
1997	L.A. Confidential	Satellite Award for Best Adapted Screenplay	Won
1997	L.A. Confidential	Society of Texas Film Critics Award for Best Adapted Screenplay	Won
1997	L.A. Confidential	Southeastern Film Critics Association Award for Best Adapted Screenplay	Won
1997	L.A. Confidential	USC Scripter Award	Won
1997	L.A. Confidential	Writers Guild of America Award for Best Adapted Screenplay	Won
1999	Payback	Cognac Festival du Film Policier Audience Award	Won
2003	Mystic River	National Society of Film Critics Award for Best Screenplay	Won
2003	Mystic River	PEN Center USA West Literary Award for Screenplay	Won
2003	Mystic River	Satellite Award for Best Adapted Screenplay	Won
2003	Mystic River	Southeastern Film Critics Association Award for Best Adapted Screenplay	Won
2003	Mystic River	USC Scripter Award	Won
2003	Mystic River	Washington D.C. Area Film Critics Association Award for Best Adapted Screenplay	Won
2003	Mystic River	American Screenwriters Association Award	Nominated
2003	Mystic River	Broadcast Film Critics Association Award for Best Screenplay	Nominated
2003	Mystic River	Chicago Film Critics Association Award for Best Screenplay	Nominated
2003	Mystic River	Edgar Allan Poe Award for Best Motion Picture Screenplay	Nominated
2003	Mystic River	Edgar Allan Poe Award for Best Motion Picture Screenplay	Nominated
2003	Mystic River	London Critics Circle Film Award for Screenwriter of the Year	Nominated
2003	Mystic River	Online Film Critics Society Award for Best Screenplay	Nominated
2003	Mystic River	Writers Guild of America Award for Best Adapted Screenplay	Nominated
2013	42	Hochi Film Award for Best Foreign Language Film	Won
2013	42	Image Award for Outstanding Writing in a Motion Picture	Nominated
2023	Finestkind	Writers Guild of America Award for Best TV & New Media Motion Pictures	Nominated
