= Mare Winningham filmography =

Actress

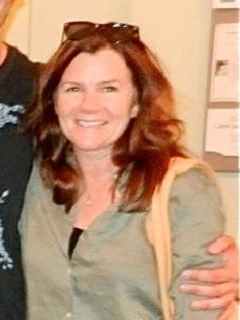
Winningham in 2012

The filmography of actress Mare Winningham consists of her acting appearances in feature film, television series appearances, television films, and Winningham's stage credits.

With over 90 acting and stage credits to her name, Winningham is known for her role as Georgia Flood in the 1995 film Georgia, a role which she won the Independent Spirit Award for Best Supporting Female. She was nominated for the Academy Award for Best Supporting Actress for her role in the film, as well. Winningham has appeared in numerous television films and limited series since the 1970s. She has won two Primetime Emmy Awards for Outstanding Supporting Actress in a Miniseries or a Movie for her roles in Amber Waves (1980) and George Wallace (1997).

Her Broadway and off-Broadway stage performances, including Casa Valentina in 2014, have garnered Winningham critical acclaim. She has been nominated for a Drama Desk Award, a Tony Award, and won a Lucille Lortel Award in 2008.

== Feature films ==
Year	Title	Role
1980	One Trick Pony	Modeena Dandridge
1981	Threshold	Carol Severance
1985	St. Elmo's Fire	Wendy Beamish
1986	Nobody's Fool	Pat
1987	Shy People	Candy
1987	Made in Heaven	Brenda Carlucci
1988	Miracle Mile	Julie Peters
1989	Turner & Hooch	Vet Dr. Emily Carson/Emily Turner
1991	Hard Promises	Dawn
1993	Sexual Healing	Marta
1994	Teresa's Tattoo	Singer
1994	Wyatt Earp	Mattie Blaylock
1994	The War	Lois Simmons
1995	Georgia	Georgia Flood
1997	Bad Day on the Block	Catherine Braverton
2003	The Adventures of Ociee Nash	Aunt Mamie Nash
2004	Dandelion	Layla Mullich
2007	War Eagle, Arkansas	Belle
2008	Swing Vote	Larissa Johnson
2009	Brothers	Elsie Cahill
2012	Mirror Mirror	Baker Margaret
2013	Philomena	Mary Hess
2017	Geostorm	Dr. Jennings
2018	O.G.	Janice
2018	The Seagull	Polina
2019	Dark Waters	Darlene Kiger
2020	News of the World	Doris Boudlin
2021	All My Puny Sorrows	Lottie Von Riesen
2024	Rob Peace	Professor Durham

== Television ==
Year	Title	Role	Notes
1977	James at 15	Wanda (uncredited)	Episode: "The Girl with the Bad Rep"
1978	Police Woman	Linda	Episode: "Battered Teachers"
1978	The Young Pioneers	Nettie Peters	3 episodes
1979	Starsky and Hutch	Joey Carston	Episode: "Ninety Pounds of Trouble"
1979	Family	Merilee Kalisher	Episode: "The Competition"
1983	The Thorn Birds	Justine O'Neill	Episode: "Part 4"
1985	ABC Afterschool Special	Beth	Episode: "One Too Many"
1986	The Twilight Zone	Norma Lewis	Episode: "Button, Button"
1997–1998	Mad About You	Sarah McCain	2 episodes
1998–1999	ER	Dr. Amanda Lee	4 episodes
2001	Night Visions	Kate Morris	Episode: "Still Life"
2002	Tru Confessions	Ginny Walker	Disney Channel Original Movie
2002	Six Feet Under	Eileen Piper	Episode: "The Plan"
2002	Touched by an Angel	Maggie	Episode: "The Bells of St. Peters"
2003	Law & Order: Special Victims Unit	Sandra Blaine	Episode: "Manic"
2003	The Brotherhood of Poland, New Hampshire	Dottie Shaw	7 episodes
2004–2005	Clubhouse	Lynne Young	11 episodes
2006–2007	Grey's Anatomy	Susan Grey	6 episodes
2007	Boston Legal	Patrice Kelly	2 episodes
2009	CSI: NY	Katherine Donovan	Episode: "Greater Good"
2010	Cold Case	Celeste Cooper	Episode: "The Good Soldier"
2010	24	Elaine Al-Zacar	2 episodes
2010	Criminal Minds	Nancy Riverton	Episode: "Safe Haven"
2011	Mildred Pierce	Ida Corwin	5 episodes
2011	Torchwood: Miracle Day	Ellis Hartley Monroe	3 episodes
2012	Hatfields & McCoys	Sally McCoy	3 episodes
2013	Hawaii Five-O	Terry Beckett	Episode: "Ho'opio"
2013	Under the Dome	Agatha Seagrave	2 episodes
2013	American Horror Story: Coven	Alicia Spencer	Episode: "The Replacements"
2014	American Horror Story: Freak Show	Rita Gayheart	Episode: "Orphans"
2014–2018	The Affair	Cherry Lockhart	14 episodes
2015–2016	American Horror Story: Hotel	Hazel Evers	11 episodes
2017	American Horror Story: Cult	Sally Keffler	Episode: "Mid-Western Assassin"
2020	The Outsider	Jeannie Anderson	10 episodes
2021	Dopesick	Diane Mallum	6 episodes
2026	Your Friends & Neighbors	Elaine Naft	1 episode

=== Television films ===
Year	Title	Roles	Notes
1976	Young Pioneers	Nettie Peters	Uncredited
1976	Young Pioneers' Christmas	Nettie Peters	
1978	Special Olympics	Janice Gallitzin	
1980	Amber Waves	Marlene Burkhardt	
1980	The Women's Room	Chris	
1980	Off the Minnesota Strip	Micki	
1981	Freedom	Libby Bellow	
1984	The Miracle Continues	Helen Keller	
1985	Love Is Never Silent	Margaret Ryder	
1986	A Winner Never Quits	Annie	
1986	Who Is Julia?	Mary Frances Bodine	
1988	God Bless the Child	Theresa Johnson	
1989	Pied Piper	Nicole Rougeron	aka Crossing To Freedom
1991	Fatal Exposure	Jamie Hurd	
1991	She Stood Alone	Prudence Crandall	
1992	Intruders	Mary Wilkes	
1993	Better Off Dead	Katherine Kit Kellner	
1995	Letter to My Killer	Judy Parma	
1996	The Boys Next Door	Sheila	
1997	George Wallace	Lurleen Wallace	
1998	Everything That Rises	Kyle Clay	
1999	Too Rich	Chandi Heffner	
2000	Sharing the Secret	Dr. Nina Moss	
2001	Snap Decision	Jennifer Bradley	
2002	Tru Confessions	Ginny Walker	
2005	The Magic of Ordinary Days	Martha	
2026	Your Friends and Neighbors	Elaine	

== Stage ==
Year	Title	Role
2007	10 Million Miles	The Women
2010	After the Revolution	Mel
2012–2013	Tribes	Beth
2013	Picnic	Flo Owens
2014	Casa Valentina	Rita
2016	Her Requiem	Allison
2019, 2020, 2021	Girl from the North Country	Elizabeth Laine
2024	Cult of Love	Virginia "Ginny" Dahl

== See also ==
- List of awards and nominations received by Mare Winningham
