= List of awards and nominations received by Mare Winningham =

Actress Mare Winningham's awards and nominations

Mare Winningham awards and nominations
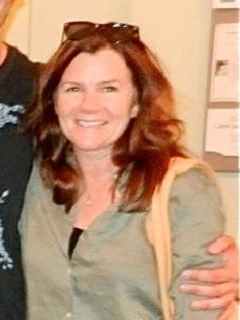
- Winningham in 2012
	Wins	Nominations
Academy Awards	0	1
Golden Globe Awards	0	1
Emmy Awards	2	8
SAG Awards	0	2
Tony Awards	0	2

Actress Mare Winningham has received many awards and nominations for her acting work. She was nominated for an Academy Award for Best Supporting Actress for her supporting role as Georgia Flood in the 1995 film Georgia. She received critical acclaim for this role and was nominated for a Screen Actors Guild Award for Outstanding Performance by a Female Actor in a Supporting Role and also won the Independent Spirit Award for Best Supporting Female. She is known for her multiple supporting and guest roles on television, and starring in numerous miniseries; which have earned Winningham two Primetime Emmy Awards for Outstanding Supporting Actress in a Miniseries or a Movie for her performance in Amber Waves (1980) and George Wallace (1997).

She has also received recognition for her contributions to the theatre, having been nominated for Tony Awards in 2014 and 2022, and a Drama Desk Award in 2008.

== Film awards ==
=== Academy Awards ===
Year	Category	Nominated work	Result	Ref.
1996	Best Supporting Actress	Georgia	Nominated	

=== Genie Awards ===
Year	Category	Nominated work	Result	Ref.
1983	Best Performance by a Foreign Actress	Threshold	Nominated	

=== Independent Spirit Awards ===
Year	Category	Nominated work	Result	Ref.
1990	Best Supporting Female	Miracle Mile	Nominated	
1996	Best Supporting Female	Georgia	Won	

=== Screen Actors Guild Awards ===
Year	Category	Nominated work	Result	Ref.
1996	Outstanding Performance by a Female Actor in a Supporting Role	Georgia	Nominated	

== Television awards ==
=== Golden Globe Awards ===
Year	Category	Nominated work	Result	Ref.
1998	Best Supporting Actress – Series, Miniseries or Television Film	George Wallace	Nominated	

=== Primetime Emmy Awards ===
Year	Category	Nominated work	Result	Ref.
1980	Outstanding Supporting Actress in a Limited or Anthology Series or Movie	Amber Waves	Won	
1986	Outstanding Lead Actress in a Limited or Anthology Series or Movie	Love Is Never Silent	Nominated	
1996	Outstanding Supporting Actress in a Limited or Anthology Series or Movie	The Boys Next Door	Nominated	
1998	Outstanding Supporting Actress in a Limited or Anthology Series or Movie	George Wallace	Won	
2004	Outstanding Guest Actress in a Drama Series	Law & Order: Special Victims Unit	Nominated	
2011	Outstanding Supporting Actress in a Limited or Anthology Series or Movie	Mildred Pierce	Nominated	
2012	Outstanding Supporting Actress in a Limited or Anthology Series or Movie	Hatfields & McCoys	Nominated	
2022	Outstanding Supporting Actress in a Limited or Anthology Series or Movie	Dopesick	Nominated	

=== Satellite Awards ===
Year	Category	Nominated work	Result	Ref.
1998	Best Supporting Actress – Series, Miniseries or Television Film	George Wallace	Nominated	
2012	Best Supporting Actress – Series, Miniseries or Television Film	Hatfields & McCoys	Nominated	

=== Screen Actors Guild Awards ===
Year	Category	Nominated work	Result	Ref.
1998	Outstanding Performance by a Female Actor in a Miniseries or Television Movie	George Wallace	Nominated	

== Theatre awards ==
=== Tony Awards ===
Year	Category	Nominated work	Result	Ref.
2014	Best Featured Actress in a Play	Casa Valentina	Nominated	
2022	Best Actress in a Musical	Girl from the North Country	Nominated	

=== Drama Desk Awards ===
Year	Category	Nominated work	Result	Ref.
2008	Outstanding Featured Actress in a Musical	10 Million Miles	Nominated	

=== Outer Critics Circle Awards ===
Year	Category	Nominated work	Result	Ref.
2014	Outstanding Featured Actress in a Play	Casa Valentina	Won	
2019	Outstanding Actress in a Musical	Girl from the North Country	Nominated	
2023	Outstanding Featured Performer in an Off-Broadway Musical	A Man of No Importance	Nominated	
2025	Outstanding Featured Performer in a Broadway Play	Cult of Love	Nominated	

=== Lucille Lortel Awards ===
Year	Category	Nominated work	Result	Ref.
2008	Outstanding Featured Actress	10 Million Miles	Nominated	
2012	Outstanding Featured Actress	Tribes	Nominated	
