= Carla Olson discography =

- Studio albums: 7
- EPs: 1
- Live albums: 4
- Compilation albums: 4

Carla Olson is a Los Angeles-based songwriter, performer and producer. Her discography consists of 10 studio albums, 4 live albums, and 4 compilations. In addition, she has been featured as a performer and producer on many albums by other artists.

== Studio albums ==
- 1987: So Rebellious a Lover (Rhino Records) with Gene Clark
- 1989: Carla Olson aka Rubies & Diamonds (Amigo, Sweden) / (Sunset Blvd Records)
- 1993: Within an Ace (Watermelon Records) featuring Mick Taylor
- 1994: Reap the Whirlwind (Sky Ranch) featuring Mick Taylor
- 2001: The Ring of Truth (Smile / Evangeline) featuring Mick Taylor
- 2013: Have Harmony, Will Travel (Busted Flat) with Peter Case, Robert Rex Waller Jr., Richie Furay, James Intveld, Gary Myrick, Scott Kempner. John York.
- 2017: Rubies & Diamonds (Sunset Blvd Records)
- 2019: The Hidden Hills Sessions (Red Parlor Records) with Todd Wolfe
- 2020: Have Harmony, Will Travel 2 (Sunset Blvd Records) featuring Stephen McCarthy, Timothy B. Schmitt, Terry Reid, Vince Melouney, Ana Gazzola, Jim Muske, and Mare Winningham.
- 2022: Night Comes Falling duet album with Stephen McCarthy (BFD Records)
- 2023: Have Harmony, Will Travel 3 includes a co~written duet with Allan Clarke, members of Broken Homes, as well as Jake Andrews, Robert Rex Waller Jr, Harvey Shield of the Mighty Echoes, Shawn Barton Vach, and B.J. Thomas’s final recording. (record label is BFD)
- 2026:For Pete's Sake (Sunset Blvd. Records) An album of songs written by Carla and Cream lyricist Pete Brown.

== Live ==
- 1990: Live (Demon) with Mick Taylor
- 1991: Live: Too Hot for Snakes (Razor Edge) with Mick Taylor - recorded March 4, 1990, at the Roxy Theatre, Hollywood, CA - reissued as “Sway ~ The Best Of Carla Olson & Mick Taylor” with additional track.
- 1992: Silhouetted in Light: Live in Concert (Demon) with Gene Clark
- 2007: In Concert (Collectors' Choice Music) with Gene Clark

== Compilations ==
- 1995: Special - The Best of Carla Olson (Virgin)
- 1995: Wave of the Hand: The Best of Carla Olson (Watermelon)
- 1995: The Best of Carla Olson - Gotta Get Back Home (Bad News)
- 2001: Honest as Daylight: The Best of Carla Olson 1981-2000 (Houston Party) - includes 3 previously unreleased tracks and 2 alternate mixes of songs from Within an Ace
- 2022: Sway The Best of Carla Olson & Mick Taylor Live (Sunset Blvd Records)

== EPs ==
- 1992: Sing 3 Songs by The Byrds (Demon) with Gene Clark - "I'll Feel a Whole Lot Better" / "Set You Free This Time" / "She Don't Care about Time"

== As a member of the Textones ==
=== Albums ===
- 1984: Midnight Mission (Gold Mountain) - reissued on Omnivore in 2015 with 5 extra tracks
- 1987: Cedar Creek (Enigma) - reissued on Omnivore in 2015 with a 1987 performance from the Catalyst, Santa Cruz, CA
- 2008: Live & Unreleased (Collector's Choice)
- 2018: Old Stone Gang (Blue Elan Records) - with guests including past members of Textones as well as Barry Goldberg, Allan Clarke (of the Hollies), and Rusty Young (of Poco).

=== Singles ===
- 1980: "Some Other Girl" / "Reason to Leave" (I.R.S. / Faulty)
- 1980: "I Can't Fight It" / "Vacation" / "The Time Is Right" (Chiswick)
- 1982: "Vacation" / "The Time Is Right" (Big Beat) - with Kathy Valentine
- 1984: "Midnight Mission" / "Upset Me" (Gold Mountain)
- 1984: "Midnight Mission" (Gold Mountain) - 12" single - two remixes

=== Compilations ===
- 1989: Through the Canyon (Rhino)
- 1990: Back in Time (Demon) - previously unreleased tracks recorded from 1979 to 1988.

== As composer ==
- 1986: Eric Johnson - Tones (Reprise) - track 6, "Trail Of Tears" (co-written with Eric Johnson and Stephen Barber)
- 1986: Melissa - III (Sono-Rodven) - track 11, "Standing In The Line"
- 1994: Percy Sledge - Blue Night (Sky Ranch / Virgin) - track 3, "Why Did You Stop"; track 10, "The Grand Blvd." (co-written with George Green)
- 2004: Percy Sledge - Shining Through the Rain (Varèse Sarabande) - track 5, "Misty Morning" (co-written with Hasse Huss and Mikael Rickfors); track 9, "Rubies & Diamonds" (co-written George Callins); track 13, "Road of No Return (co-written with Mikael Rickfors)
- 2005: Eric Johnson - Live from Austin, TX (New West) - track 4, "Trail of Tears" (co-written with Eric Johnson and Stephen Barber)
- 2019: Allan Clarke - "Resurgence" BMG Records - Hearts Of Stone - co-written with Allan Clarke and Francis Haines
- 2023: Mikael Rickfors - "Rickfors" - Eagle Records Sweden
- 2023: Pete Brown - details tba

== As producer ==
- 1997:[Mikael Rickfors - Happy Man Don't Kill (Sonet)
- 1998: Mare Winningham - Lonesomers (Razor & Tie)
- 1999: Davis Gaines - All My Tomorrows (Lap)
- 2001: Phil Upchurch - Tell the Truth! (Evidence)
- 2001: various artists - Blue Xmas: Christmas Blues Instrumentals (Evidence)
- 2002: Barry Goldberg - Stoned Again (Antone's) featuring Denny Freeman, Mick Taylor.
- 2002: Jake Andrews - Jake Andrews (Texas Music Group)
- 2002: Joe Louis Walker - Paso Tiempo (Evidence Music) featuring Ernie Watts, Wallace Roney.
- 2002: various artists - Hey Bo Diddley: A Tribute (Evidence)
- 2008: Doña Oxford - Step Up (Fountainbleau)
- 2009: Paul Jones Starting All Over Again (Collectors' Choice Music in the U.S., CRS in Europe) featuring Jake Andrews, Mikael Rickfors, Eric Clapton.
- 2012: Ana Gazzola - Musicas E Palavras Dos Bee Gees (Fuel 2000) featuring Eric Johnson, Peter Leinheiser, Laurence Juber.
- 2012: Chubby Tavares - Jealousy (Fuel 2000)
- 2013: Carla Olson - "Have Harmony, Will Travel" - (Busted Flat) - featuring Peter Case, Richie Furay, James Intveld, Scott Kempner, Gary Myrick, Juice Newton, Robert Rex Waller Jr, John York.
- 2015: Paul Jones - Suddenly I Like It (Continental Blue Heaven) - released in the Netherlands and featuring Joe Bonamassa, Jools Holland.
- 2018: Barry Goldberg - "In the Groove" (Sunset Blvd Records) - featuring Denny Freeman, James Inveldt, Les McCann.
- 2018: Big Kettle Drum - "I Thought You'd Be Bigger"
- 2019: Ash Grunwald - "Mojo"
- 2020: Carla Olson - "Have Harmony, Will Travel 2" (Sunset Blvd Records) featuring Ana Gazzola, Stephen McCarthy, Jim Muske, Peter Noone, Terry Reid, Timothy B. Schmit.
- 2021: Americana Railroad (BMG Records) - featuring Dave Alvin, James Intveld, Gary Myrick, Stephen McCarthy, Robert Rex Waller Jr, John York.
- 2021: Ladies Sing Lightfoot - featuring Kristi Callan, Susan Cowsill, Natalie Noone, Shawn Barton Vach, Darling West, Ana Gazzola, Ilsey Juber, Maura Kennedy, Sarah Kramer, Arwen Lewis, Katy Moffatt,
- 2021: Kris Wiley (Continental Record Services, Holland)
- 2022: Stephen McCarthy & Carla Olson - "Night Comes Falling" (BFD Records)
- 2023: Jake Andrews - "Train Back Home" (BFD Records)
- 2023: Robert Rex Waller Jr. - "See The Big Man Cry" (BFD Records)

== As primary artist/song contributor ==
- 1993: various artists - Conmemorativo: A Tribute to Gram Parsons (Rhino) - track 11, "Do You Know How It Feels to Be Lonesome?"
- 1995: various artists - Sing Hollies in Reverse (Eggbert) - track 17, "Touch"
- 2000: various artists - Full Circle: A Tribute to Gene Clark (Not Lame) - track 2-17, "After the Storm"

== Also appears on ==
- 1980: Phil Seymour - Phil Seymour (Boardwalk Entertainment) - lead guitar on track 8, "We Don't Get Along"
- 1991: The Droogs - Guerrilla Love-In (Music Maniac) - vocals on track 7, "Morning Dew"
- 1994: Percy Sledge - Blue Night (Sky Ranch / Virgin) - guitar, vocals
- 1996: Mark Lindsay - Video Dreams ('Alala) - guitar, vocals
- 2001: Brian Joens - Hollywoodland (Spinout) - vocals
- 2005: Dwight Twilley - Have a Twilley Christmas (Digital Musicworks) - vocals
- 2011: Jon Emery - A Thousand Sad Goodbyes: Jon Emery Sings the Songs of Gene Clark (E Records) - vocals

== Sources ==
- Carla Olson discography at AllMusic
