= Steve De Jarnatt =

American film director

- Born: United States
- Education: Evergreen State College
- Occupations: Film director, screenwriter

Steve De Jarnatt is an American film and television director, screenwriter, and short-story author.

== Background and education ==
De Jarnatt grew up in Longview, Washington. His father, Arlie De Jarnatt, was a teacher and public representative who taught history and civics at Monticello Middle School and later R. A. Long High School. He also served five terms as a Democratic Party member of the Washington House of Representatives and six years as a state senator. De Jarnatt's mother, Donna, was an artist who also taught at St. Helens Elementary School and Monticello Middle.

De Jarnatt himself attended R.A. Long, graduating in 1970. Although he was a successful sprinter at high school (where he set several records), he chose Occidental College in Los Angeles, rather than take a track scholarship to a local public university, because he preferred the Southern Californian climate and environment. De Jarnatt first took an interest in film during his time at Occidental; attracted by "access to good film equipment," he subsequently attended The Evergreen State College, from which he graduated in 1974. He later studied at the American Film Institute.

== Career ==
De Jarnatt is perhaps best known for writing and directing the nuclear-apocalypse thriller Miracle Mile (1988) and directing the sci-fi film Cherry 2000 (1987). In 1983, Miracle Mile was chosen by American Film magazine as one of the ten best unproduced screenplays circulating in Hollywood. That same year, De Jarnatt received his first screen credit as one of the writers of Strange Brew, a comedy starring Rick Moranis and Dave Thomas as their respective SCTV characters Bob and Doug McKenzie.

De Jarnatt has also directed episodic television, including The X-Files, Lizzie McGuire, Flight 29 Down, ER, and Alfred Hitchcock Presents.

His short story, "Rubiaux Rising", appeared in the 2009 edition of The Best American Short Stories, as selected by author Alice Sebold. A collection of De Jarnatt's stories, Grace for Grace, was published in 2020.

== Selected filmography ==
- 1975: Eat the Sun (writer, producer)
- 1978 Tarzana (writer, director)
- 1983: Strange Brew (writer)
- 1988: Cherry 2000 (director)
- 1988: Miracle Mile (writer, director)
- 1998: Futuresport (writer)
