= Marshall Frady =

American journalist and author (1940–2004)

Marshall B. Frady
- Born: January 11, 1940; Augusta, Georgia, US
- Died: March 9, 2004 (aged 64); Greenville, South Carolina, US
- Education: Furman University
- Occupation: journalist
- Known for: Civil Rights Movement
- Awards: Emmy Award (1982)

Marshall Bolton Frady (January 11, 1940 – March 9, 2004) was an American Emmy Award-winning journalist and author particularly known for his work on the civil rights movement in the American South. In 1968, he published Wallace, a biography of George Wallace, later described by contemporary Marc Cooper as "an instant classic". In 1982, he won an Emmy Award for his work on a documentary about mercenaries, Soldiers of the Twilight.

His articles appeared in The New York Review of Books, The New Yorker, Newsweek, Life and Harper's, and he contributed to the American Broadcasting Company's news series Close Up and Nightline.

== Life and career ==
Frady was born in Augusta, Georgia, on January 11, 1940. His father, Rev. J. Yates Frady, was a minister in the Southern Baptist church. In 1963, Frady received a bachelor's degree from Furman University, where he later joined the faculty as writer in residence. He began as a journalist at Newsweek, later moving to the Saturday Evening Post and contributing to Harper's and Life. Frady was married four times, to Susanne Barker (January 20, 1961 – October 1966), Gloria Mochel (November 10, 1966 – 1975), and Gudrun Barbara Schunk, whom he married on May 14, 1975, and in 1989 to Barbara Gandolfo-Frady who survived him. He had three children: Katrina, Carson, and Shannon.

In addition to his print work, Frady was also active as a television journalist, contributing to the American Broadcasting Company's news series Close Up and Nightline. In 1982, he won an Emmy for his work on a documentary about mercenaries, Soldiers of the Twilight. In 1984, his production To Save Our Schools, To Save Our Children won a Peabody Award.

== Wallace ==
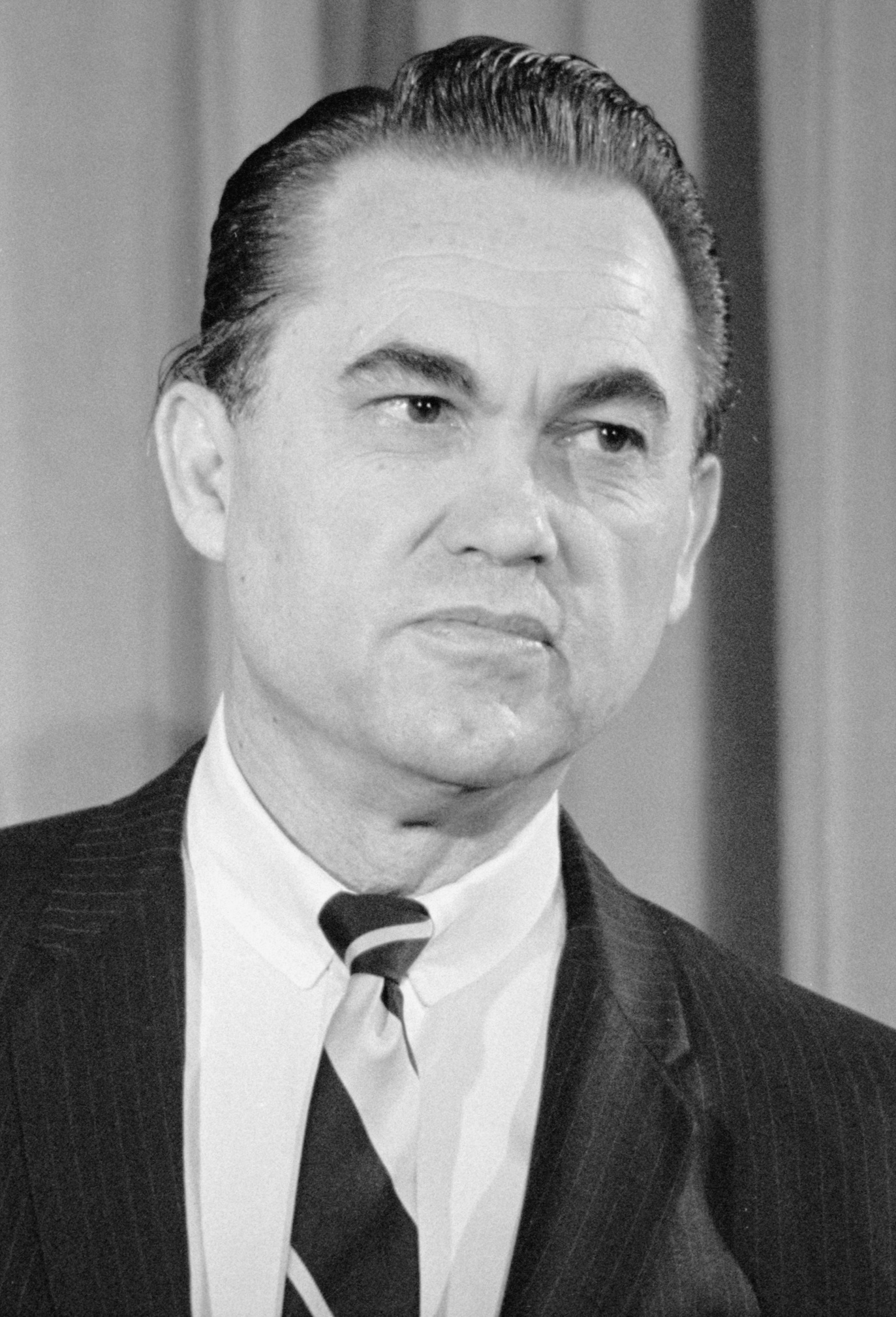
Frady was best known for his biography of George Wallace (pictured).

The author of several books, Frady is best known for Wallace, his first. This biography of segregationist Governor of Alabama George Wallace was released in 1968, during the presidential election in which Wallace was running as a third-party candidate for the American Independent Party. Originally intended as a novel, the work became a nonfiction project after Frady conducted eight months of interviews with Wallace's staff and associates.

Some commentators criticized Wallace as being an overly sympathetic portrait of the governor, but Wallace himself was angered by his portrayal and threatened to sue for libel. The New York Times Book Review stated that Wallace was "one of the finest pieces of political reporting published in years—a sensitive, informed and funny feat of high journalism that is a classic of the kind", while a New Republic reviewer said that Frady "established new standards in political biography by ignoring stylistic traditions and instead seeking the essence and the spirit of this unique and terrifying political figure through novelistic techniques." After Frady's death, contemporary Marc Cooper described Wallace as having been "an instant classic".

In 1997, Wallace was adapted into a television miniseries for TNT titled George Wallace. John Frankenheimer won an Emmy award directing the series, and Gary Sinise, who starred as Wallace, also won an Emmy for his performance.

=== Other works ===
In 1971, Frady published Across a Darkling Plain: An American's Passage through the Middle East, which recounted his travels in Israel, Egypt, and Jordan. In 1979, after four years of research, he published a biography of evangelist Billy Graham, Billy Graham: A Parable of American Righteousness. Eighteen of his magazine articles were collected in book form as Southerners: A Journalist's Odyssey in 1980. Later in life he published biographies of civil rights leaders Jesse Jackson (Jesse: The Life and Pilgrimage of Jesse Jackson, 1996) and Martin Luther King Jr. (Martin Luther King Jr., 2001).

== Death and papers ==
Frady died of cancer on March 9, 2004, in Greenville, South Carolina. Jesse Jackson presided over his memorial service. At the time of his death, Frady owed approximately $200,000 in taxes to the Internal Revenue Service, causing his papers to be seized and auctioned off by the agency. They sold to Emory University for $10,100.
