= Lonesomers =

Studio album by Mare Winningham
- Released: 1997
- Recorded: 1996–1997
- Genre: Folk rock
- Length: 43:26 (first issue), 40:25 (second issue)
- Labels: Fairy Devil Music; Razor & Tie Records
- Producer: Carla Olson

Mare Winningham chronology
What Might Be (1992)	Lonesomers (1997)	Refuge Rock Sublime (2007)

Alternative cover

Professional ratings
Review scores
Source	Rating
Allmusic	link

Lonesomers is the second studio album released by American singer and actress Mare Winningham in 1997.

== Background ==
Winningham has worked on a musical career at the same time as her better known work as an actress, fronting several folk-rock bands in the 1980s, doing live shows. It was not until 1992 that her first solo record got released on an independent small label based in the San Francisco Bay Area, which received a very limited release. With her Oscar-nominated role as a folk singer in the 1995 movie Georgia, her vocal and musical skills got more noticed by the general public and she started work on her second album.

Lonesomers is a folk rock album with songs mostly dealing with relationship issues. Winningham solely penned all the songs on the album except for a cover of The Rolling Stones' "The Last Time", as well as playing the guitar and dulcimer. The album was produced by former The Textones vocalist Carla Olson.

== Release and reception ==
Despite critical acclaim for her voice and guitar playing, looking for a label contract proved difficult for Winningham. "Some labels looked at me skeptically when I was looking for a deal, they were viewing me as an actor who sings, instead of as a singer who acts.", she recalled. When she couldn't secure a record deal, she first released the record on her own label in mid-1997 and sold the album on her live shows and locally around San Francisco, where she was based at the time. Winningham then negotiated with label Varèse Sarabande to reissue the album for a wider distribution, but the deal fell through, and ultimately it was the label Razor & Tie who signed Winningham and finally re-released the album on June 30, 1998. This marked Winningham's first album that achieved a major nationwide distribution. The original release and the Razor & Tie release include a slightly different track listing as well as different artwork.

The album received good reviews, with Allmusic's Stephen Thomas Erlewine favourably remarking Winningham's voice and songwriting, calling it "a humble, appealing album that relies on craftsmanship instead of flash", despite some songs being "slightly monotonous". He awarded the album three stars out of five.

== Track listing ==
The first, self-released edition of the album consisted of 12 tracks. When label Razor & Tie picked up the album, two songs from the original version were not included: a cover of Ian & Sylvia's "Someday Soon" and the Winningham original "Big Dirt Bed". However, the Razor & Tie reissue included a new original song, "Leave It Alone".

== Track listing ==
No.	Title	Writer(s)	Length
1.	"Miles"		3:12
2.	"Big Dirt Bed"		3:11
3.	"This Tower"		3:10
4.	"The Last Time"	Mick Jagger; Keith Richards	3:32
5.	"Are You Smiling"		3:16
6.	"Someday Soon"	Ian Tyson	3:21
7.	"Lonesomers"		5:12
8.	"Silver Bullets"		4:26
9.	"Quietly Tonight"		4:24
10.	"Wake Up"		3:08
11.	"World That I Love"		3:00
12.	"It's So Hard"		3:34
Total length:			43:26
