= 2nd Golden Satellite Awards =

Awards ceremony for film and television

- Date: February 22, 1998

Highlights
- Best drama film: Titanic
- Best comedy/musical film: As Good as It Gets
- Best television drama: NYPD Blue
- Best television musical/comedy: Frasier
- Best director: James Cameron for Titanic

The 2nd Golden Satellite Awards, given on February 22, 1998, honored the best in film and television of 1997.

== Special achievement awards ==
Mary Pickford Award (for outstanding contribution to the entertainment industry) – Jodie Foster

Outstanding New Talent – Aaron Eckhart

== Motion picture winners and nominees ==
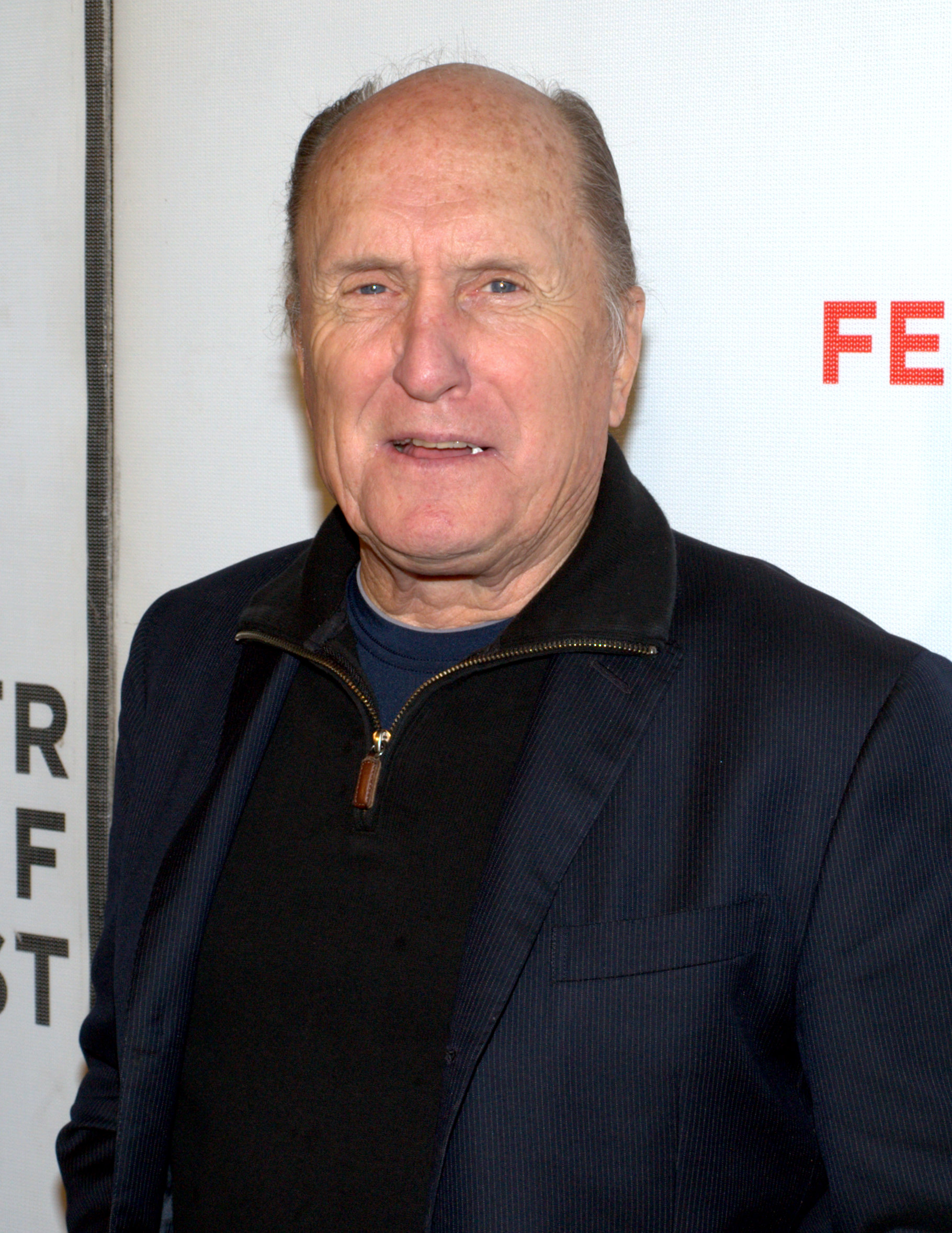
Robert Duvall – Best Actor in a Motion Picture, Drama

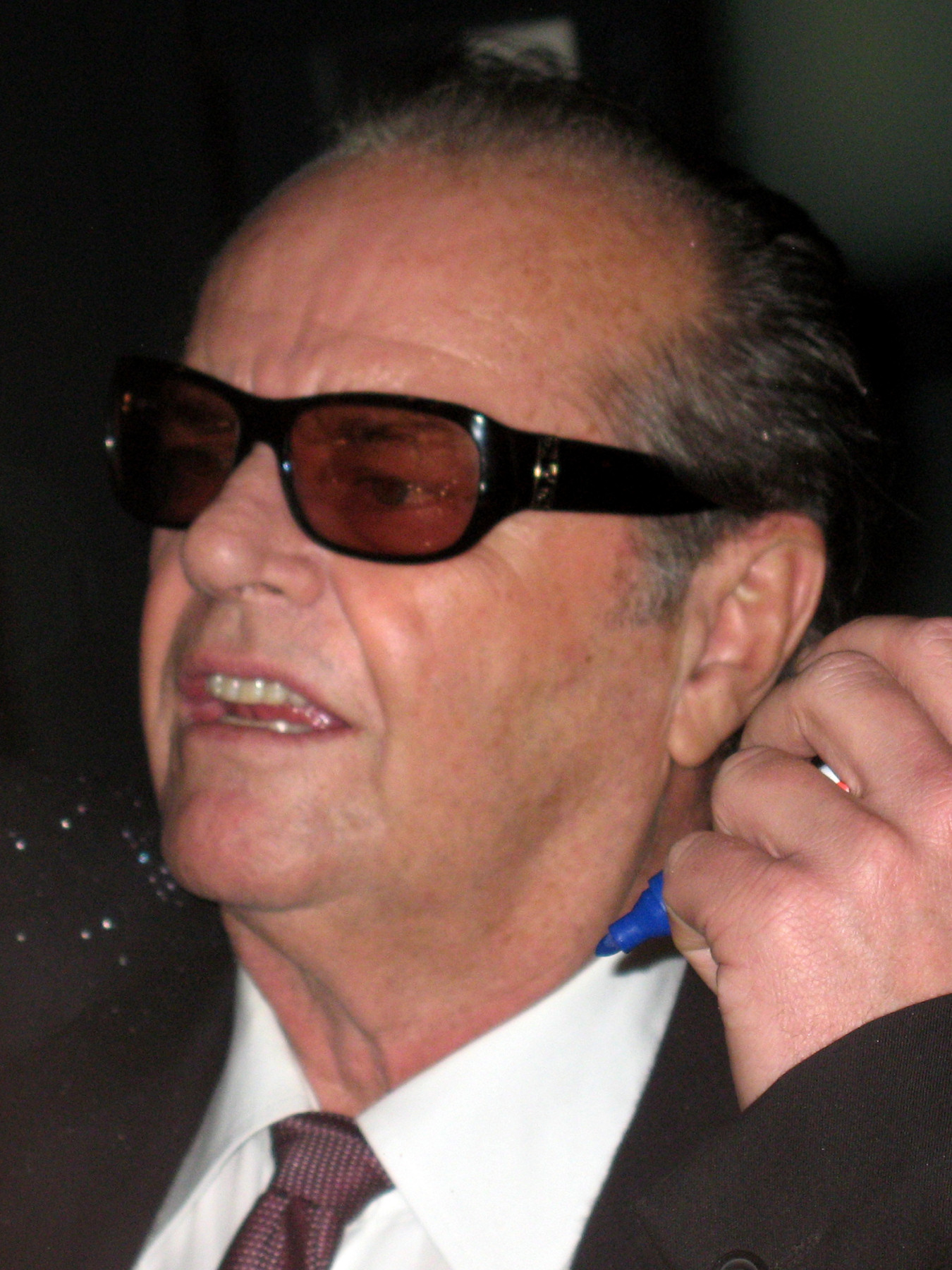
Jack Nicholson – Best Actor in a Motion Picture, Comedy or Musical

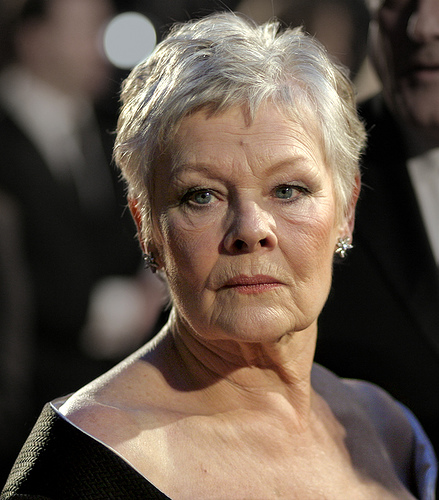
Judi Dench – Best Actress in a Motion Picture, Drama

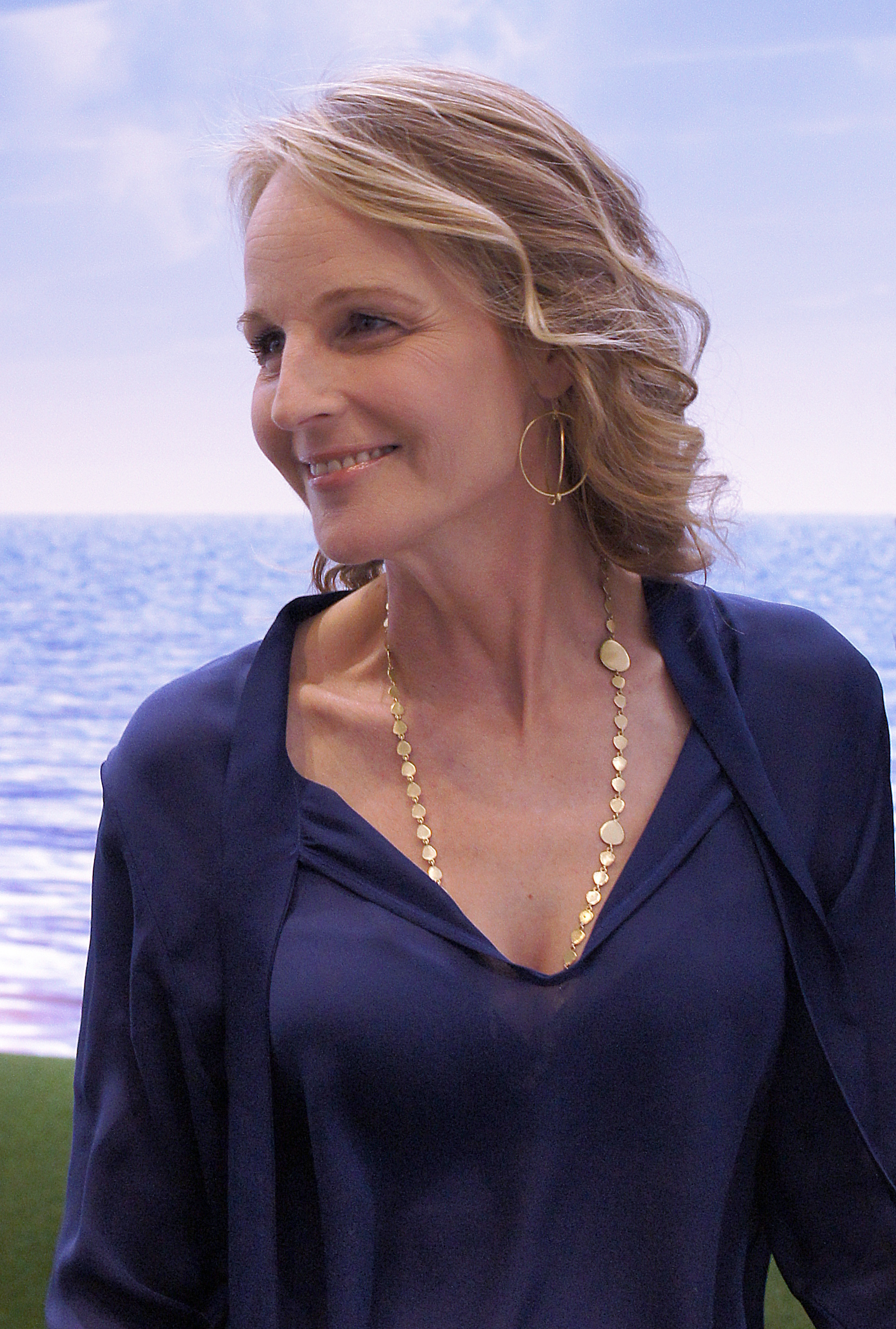
Helen Hunt – Best Actress in a Motion Picture, Comedy or Musical

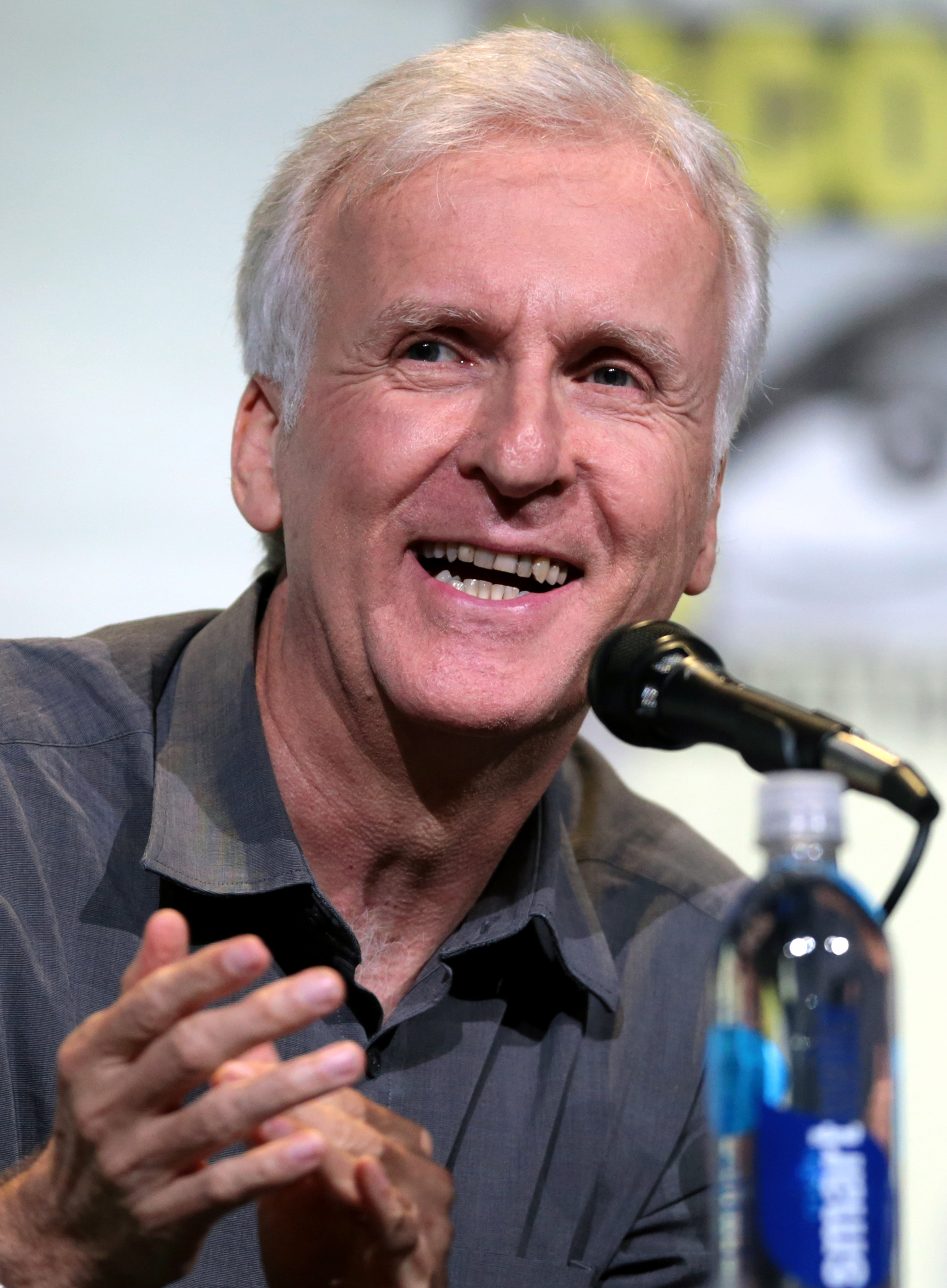
James Cameron – Best Director

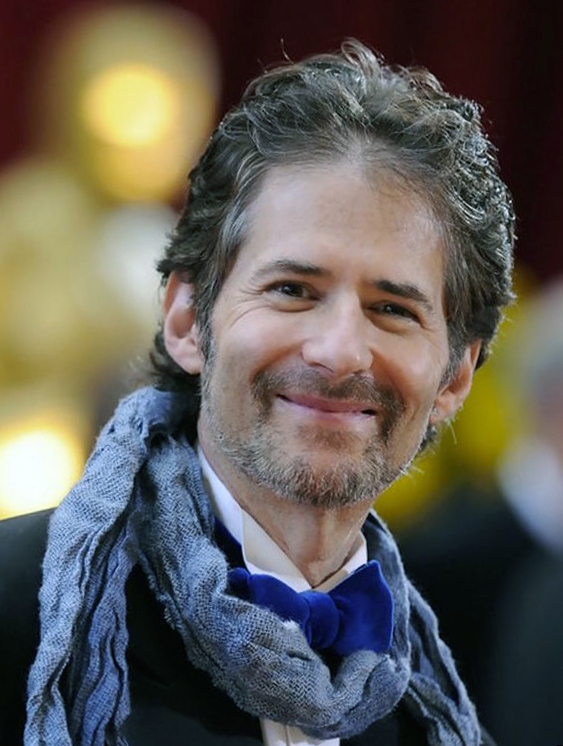
James Horner – Best Original Score

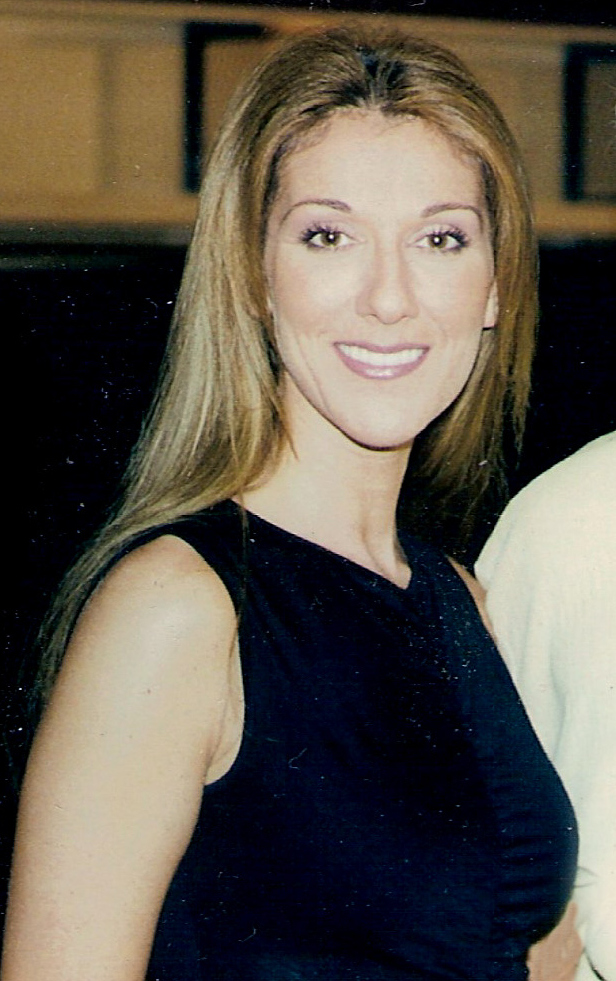
Celine Dion – Best Original Song: "My Heart Will Go On"

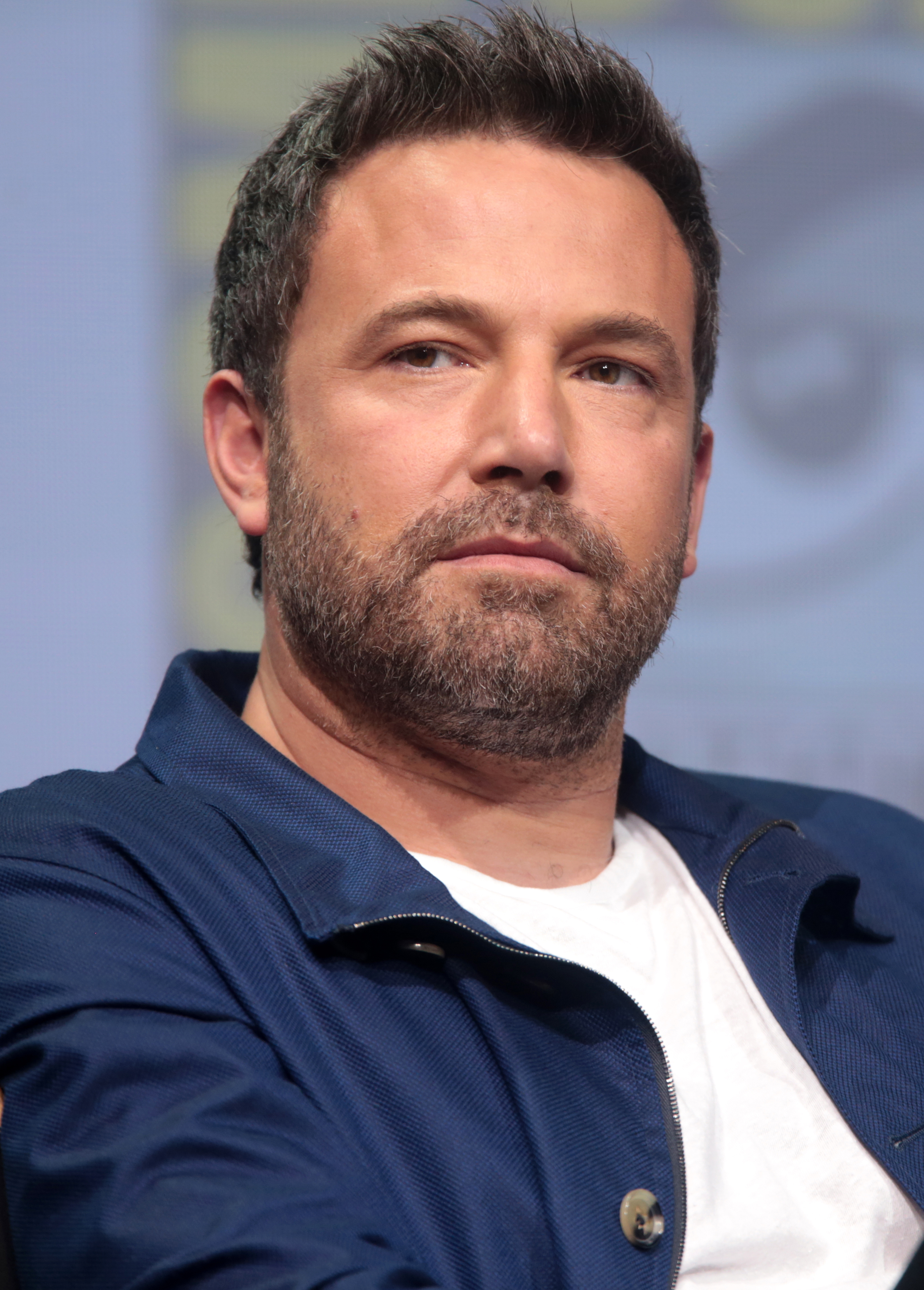
Ben Affleck – Best Original Screenplay

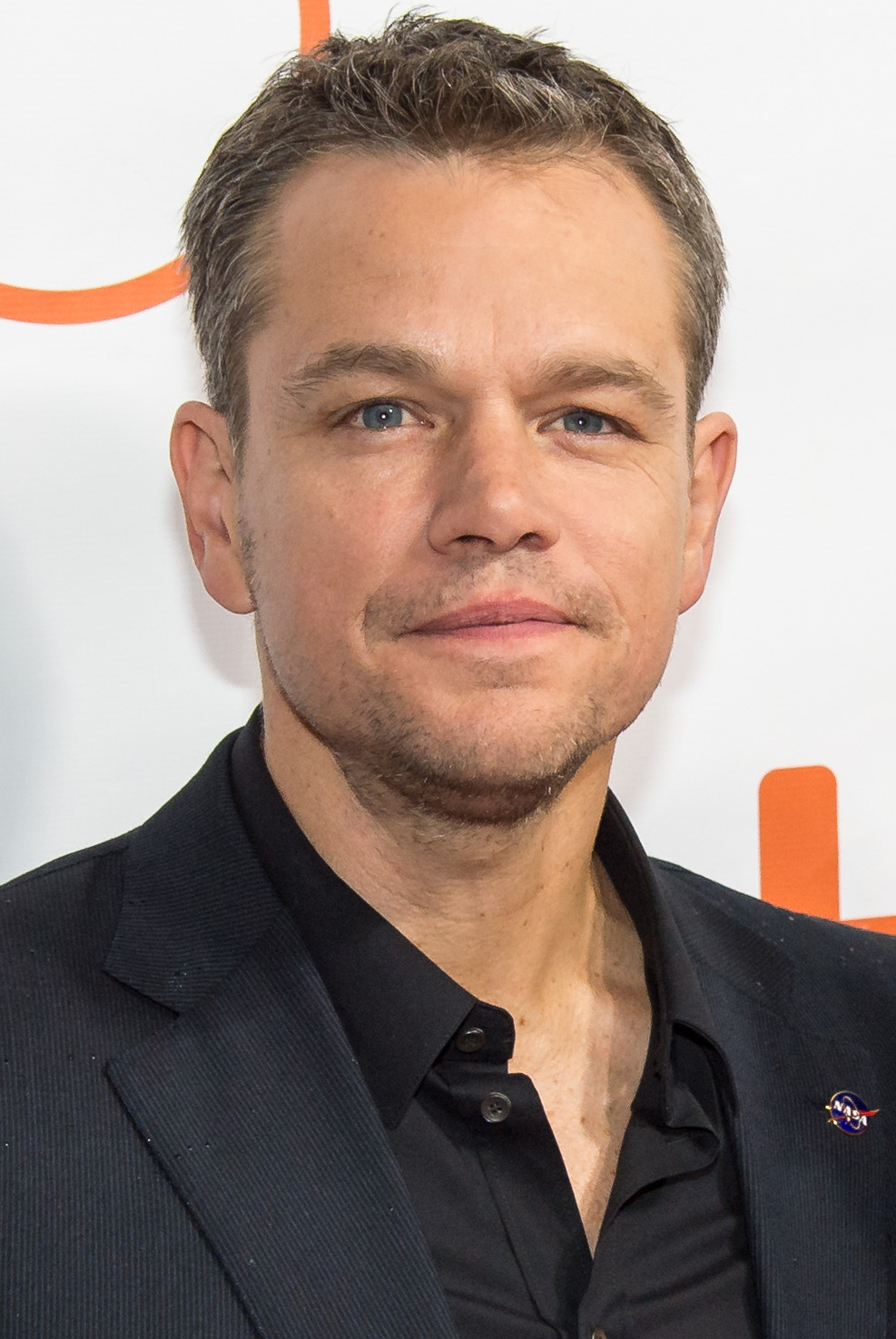
Matt Damon – Best Original Screenplay

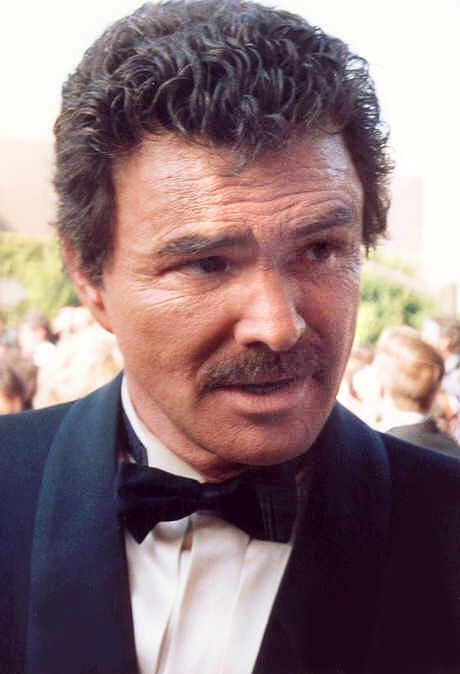
Burt Reynolds – Best Supporting Actor in a Motion Picture, Drama

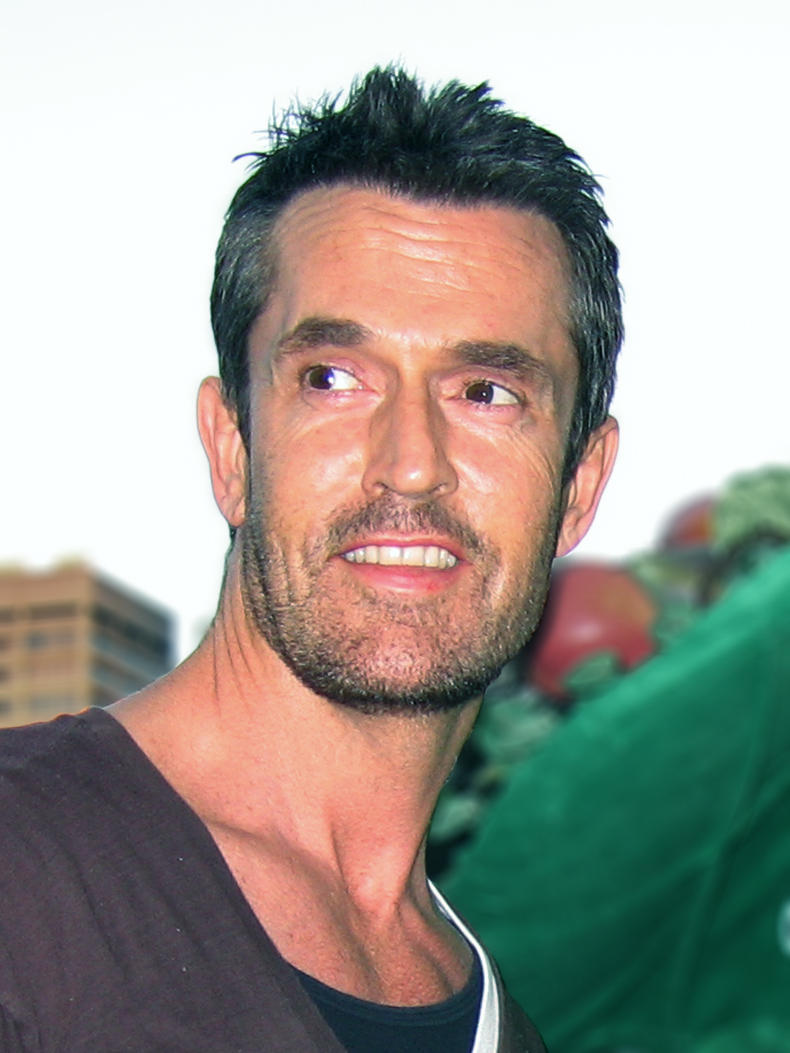
Rupert Everett – Best Supporting Actor in a Motion Picture, Comedy or Musical

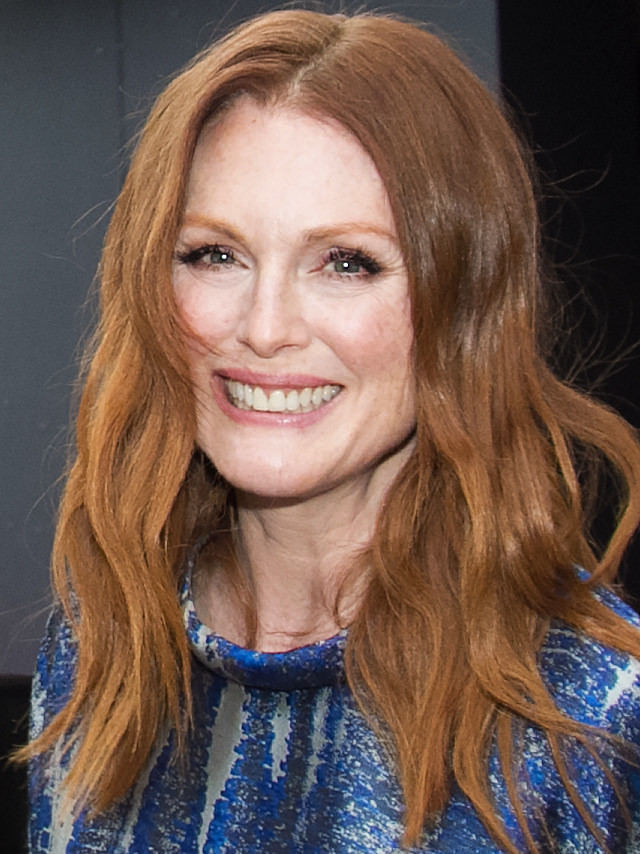
Julianne Moore – Best Supporting Actress in a Motion Picture, Drama

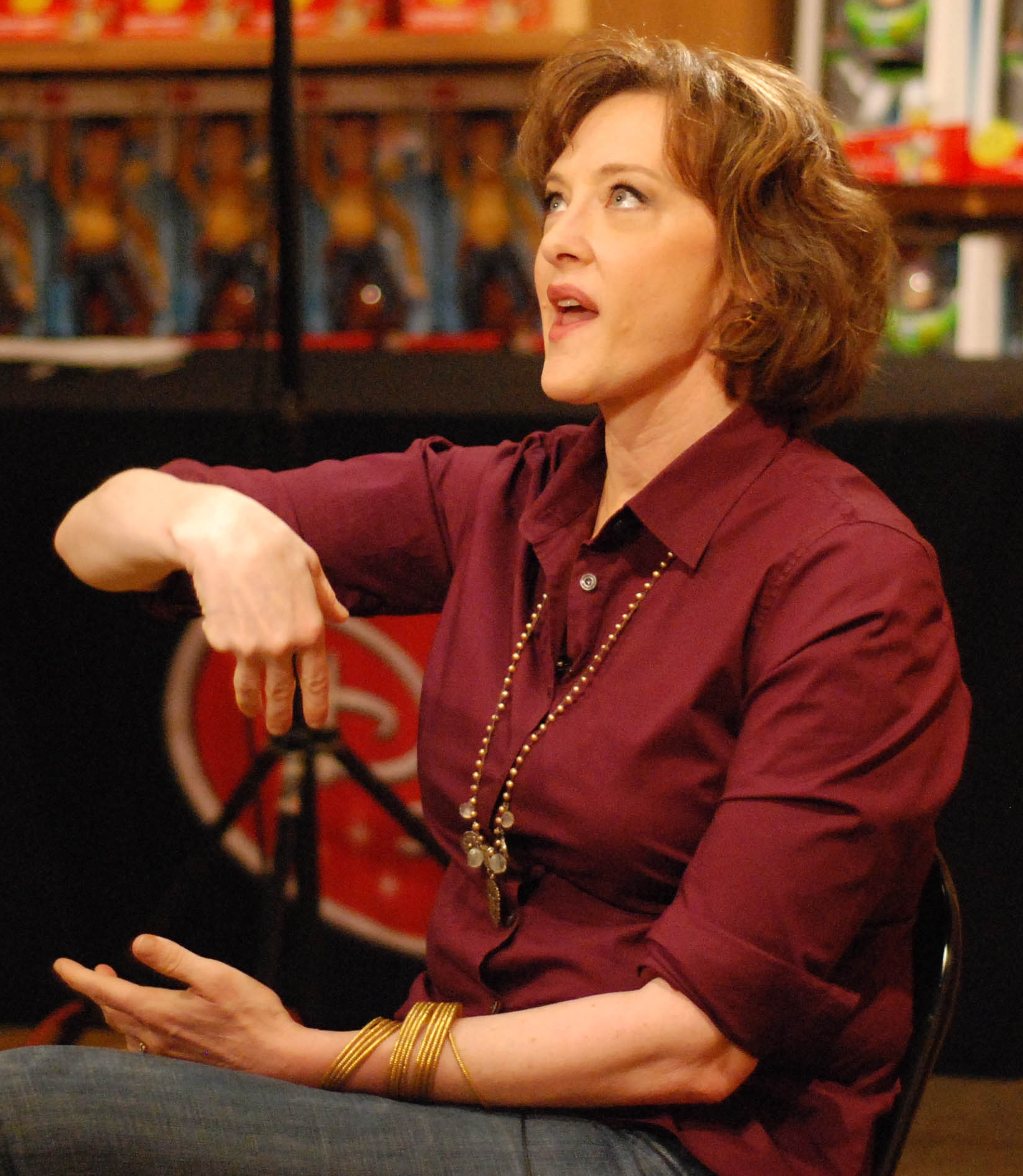
Joan Cusack – Best Supporting Actress in a Motion Picture, Comedy or Musical

=== Best Actor – Drama ===
Robert Duvall – The Apostle

- Russell Crowe – L.A. Confidential
- Matt Damon – Good Will Hunting
- Leonardo DiCaprio – Titanic
- Djimon Hounsou – Amistad
- Mark Wahlberg – Boogie Nights

=== Best Actor – Musical or Comedy ===
Jack Nicholson – As Good as It Gets

- Robert Carlyle – The Full Monty
- Dustin Hoffman – Wag the Dog
- Tommy Lee Jones – Men in Black
- Kevin Kline – In & Out
- Howard Stern – Private Parts

=== Best Actress – Drama ===
Judi Dench – Mrs Brown

- Joan Allen – The Ice Storm
- Helena Bonham Carter – The Wings of the Dove
- Julie Christie – Afterglow
- Kate Winslet – Titanic

=== Best Actress – Musical or Comedy ===
Helen Hunt – As Good as It Gets

- Pam Grier – Jackie Brown
- Lisa Kudrow – Romy and Michele's High School Reunion
- Parker Posey – The House of Yes
- Julia Roberts – My Best Friend's Wedding

=== Best Animated or Mixed Media Film ===
Men in Black

- Alien: Resurrection
- Anastasia
- The Lost World: Jurassic Park
- Starship Troopers

=== Best Art Direction ===
Titanic – Peter Lamont

- Amistad
- Gattaca
- L.A. Confidential
- The Wings of the Dove

=== Best Cinematography ===
Amistad – Janusz Kaminski

- Contact
- Eve's Bayou
- L.A. Confidential
- Titanic

=== Best Costume Design ===
Titanic – Deborah Lynn Scott

- Amistad
- Beaumarchais the Scoundrel (Beaumarchais, l'insolent)
- Mrs Brown
- The Wings of the Dove

=== Best Director ===
James Cameron – Titanic

- Paul Thomas Anderson – Boogie Nights
- Curtis Hanson – L.A. Confidential
- Steven Spielberg – Amistad
- Gus Van Sant – Good Will Hunting

=== Best Documentary Film ===
4 Little Girls

- Fast, Cheap and Out of Control
- Hype!
- Shooting Porn
- SICK: The Life & Death of Bob Flanagan, Supermasochist

=== Best Editing ===
Titanic – Richard A. Harris and Conrad Buff

- Air Force One
- Amistad
- Boogie Nights
- L.A. Confidential

=== Best Film – Drama ===
Titanic

- Amistad
- Boogie Nights
- Good Will Hunting
- L.A. Confidential

=== Best Film – Musical or Comedy ===
As Good as It Gets

- Deconstructing Harry
- The Full Monty
- In & Out
- My Best Friend's Wedding

=== Best Foreign Language Film ===
Shall We Dance? (Shall We Dansu?) • Japan

- My Life in Pink (Ma vie en rose) • France
- Ponette • France
- The Promise (La promesse) • Belgium
- Live Flesh (Carne trémula) • Spain

=== Best Original Score ===
"Titanic" – James Horner

- "Amistad" – John Williams
- "Anastasia" – David Newman
- "L.A. Confidential" – Jerry Goldsmith
- "One Night Stand" – Mike Figgis

=== Best Original Song ===
"My Heart Will Go On" performed by Céline Dion – Titanic

- "Journey to the Past" – Anastasia
- "Once Upon a December" – Anastasia
- "A Song for Mama" – Soul Food
- "Tomorrow Never Dies" – Tomorrow Never Dies

=== Best Screenplay – Adapted ===
L.A. Confidential – Curtis Hanson and Brian Helgeland

- Amistad – David Franzoni
- The Ice Storm – James Schamus
- The Sweet Hereafter – Atom Egoyan
- The Wings of the Dove – Hossein Amini

=== Best Screenplay – Original ===
Good Will Hunting – Ben Affleck and Matt Damon

- Boogie Nights – Paul Thomas Anderson
- The Full Monty – Simon Beaufoy
- Mrs Brown – Jeremy Brock
- Titanic – James Cameron

=== Best Supporting Actor – Drama ===
Burt Reynolds – Boogie Nights

- Billy Connolly – Mrs Brown
- Danny DeVito – The Rainmaker
- Samuel L. Jackson – Eve's Bayou
- Robin Williams – Good Will Hunting

=== Best Supporting Actor – Musical or Comedy ===
Rupert Everett – My Best Friend's Wedding

- Mark Addy – The Full Monty
- Cuba Gooding Jr. – As Good as It Gets
- Greg Kinnear – As Good as It Gets
- Rip Torn – Men in Black

=== Best Supporting Actress – Drama ===
Julianne Moore – Boogie Nights

- Minnie Driver – Good Will Hunting
- Ashley Judd – Kiss the Girls
- Debbi Morgan – Eve's Bayou
- Sigourney Weaver – The Ice Storm

=== Best Supporting Actress – Musical or Comedy ===
Joan Cusack – In & Out

- Cameron Diaz – My Best Friend's Wedding
- Linda Fiorentino – Men in Black
- Anne Heche – Wag the Dog
- Shirley Knight – As Good as It Gets

=== Best Visual Effects ===
Contact – Ken Ralston

- The Fifth Element
- Men in Black
- Starship Troopers
- Titanic

=== Outstanding Motion Picture Ensemble ===
Boogie Nights

== Television winners and nominees ==
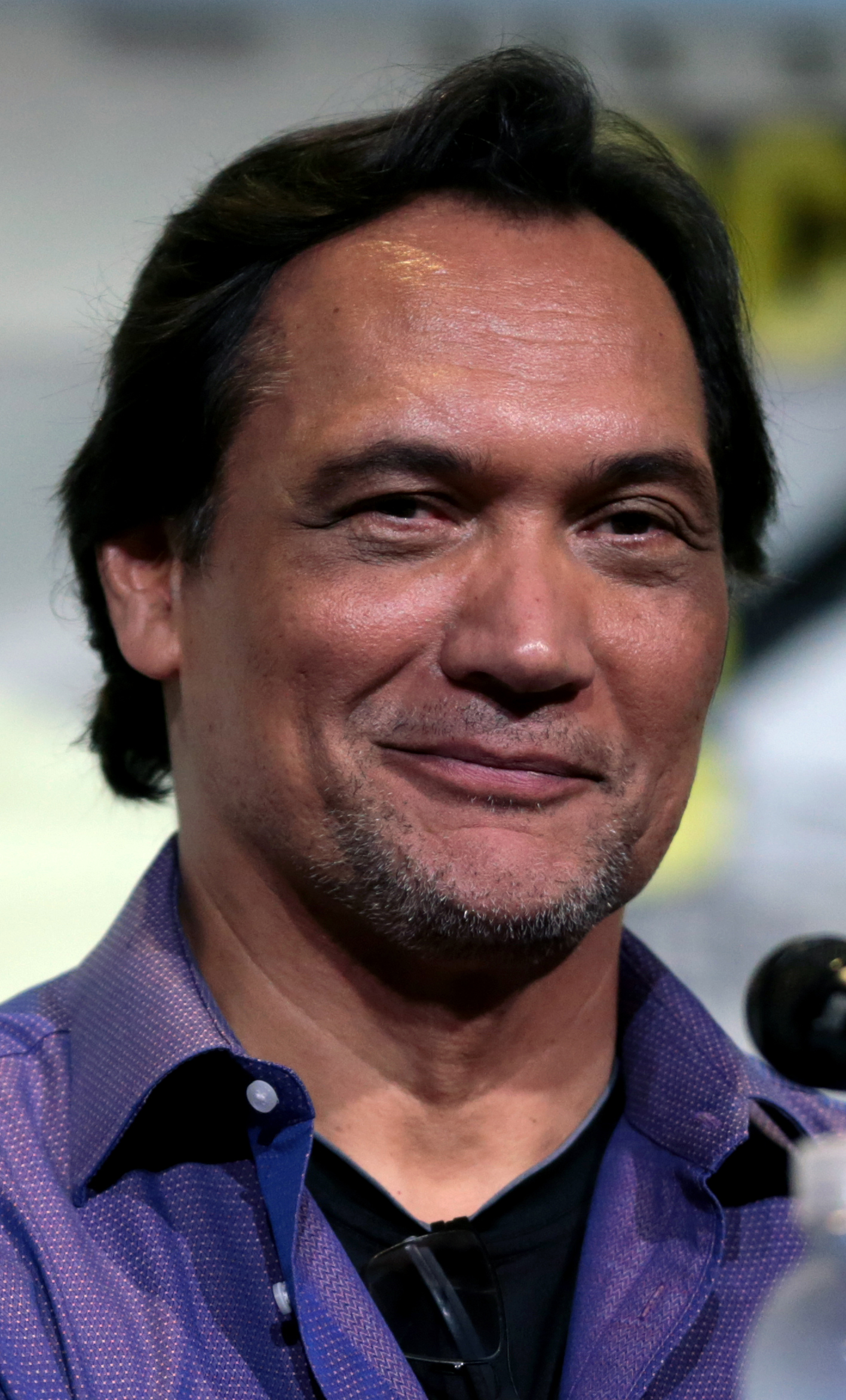
Jimmy Smits – Best Actor in a Series, Drama

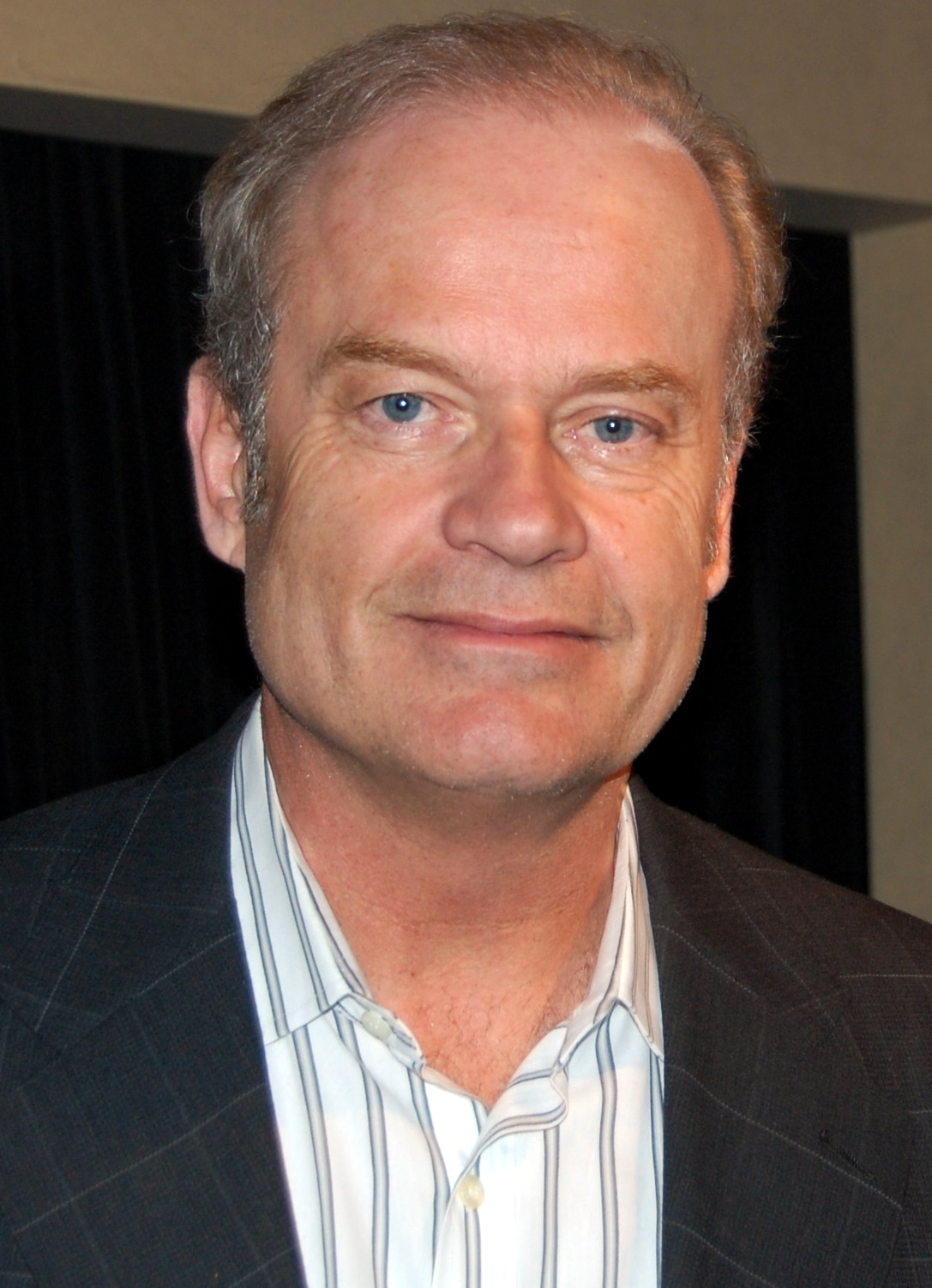
Kelsey Grammer – Best Actor in a Series, Comedy or Musical

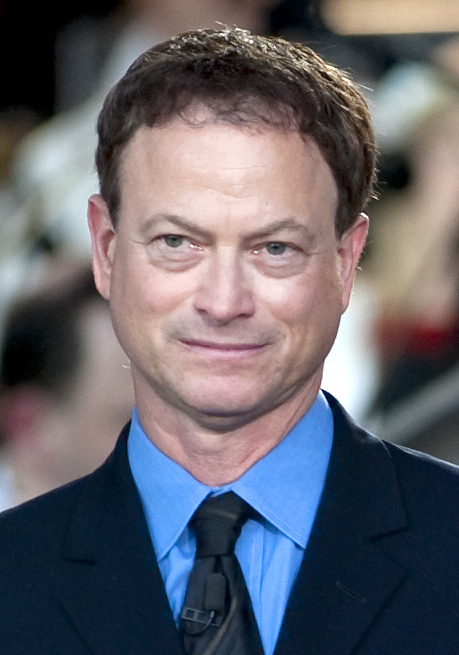
Gary Sinise – Best Actor in a Miniseries or Television Film

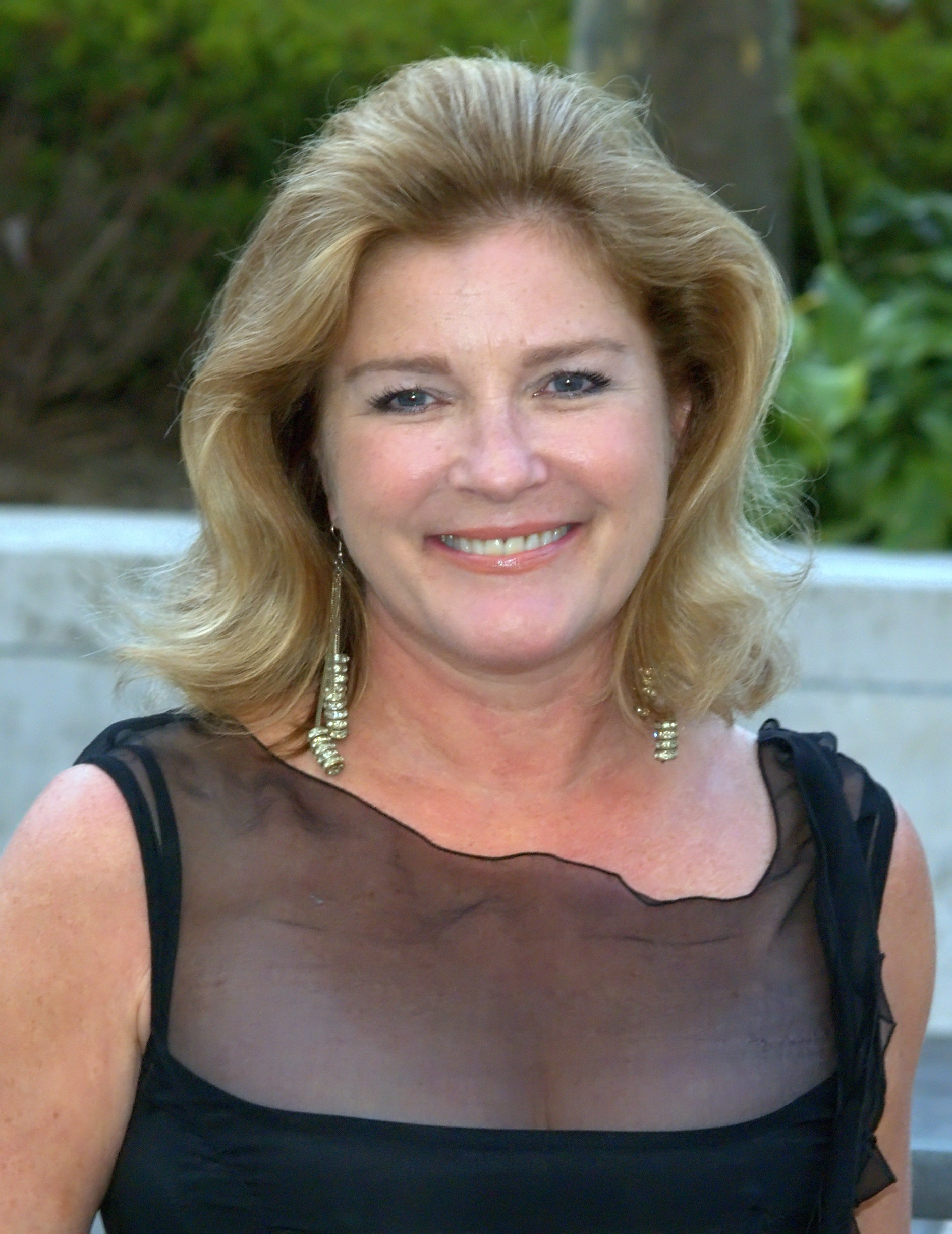
Kate Mulgrew – Best Actress in a Series, Drama

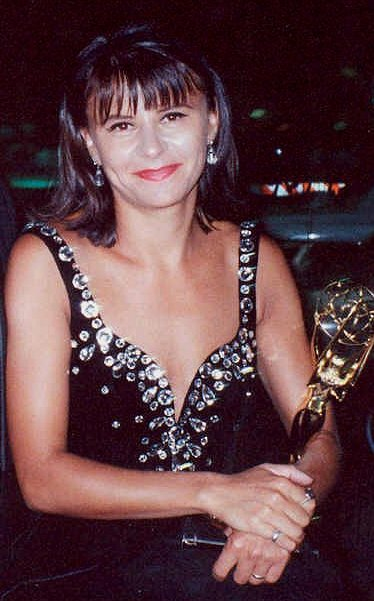
Tracey Ullman – Best Actress in a Series, Comedy or Musical

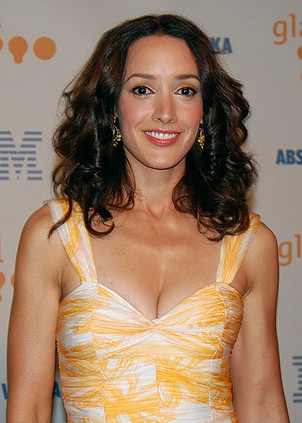
Jennifer Beals – Best Actress in a Miniseries or Television Film

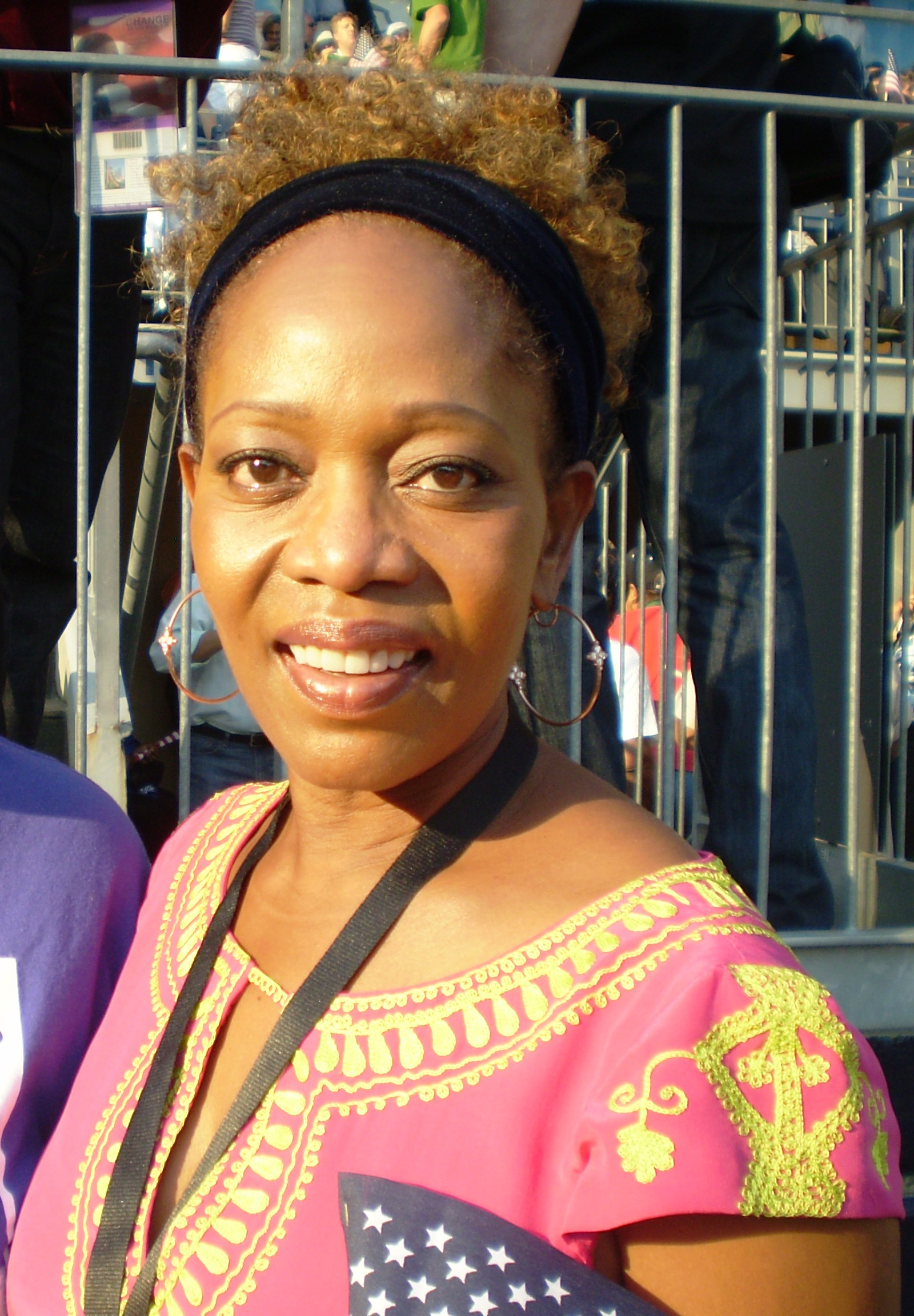
Alfre Woodard – Best Actress in a Miniseries or Television Film

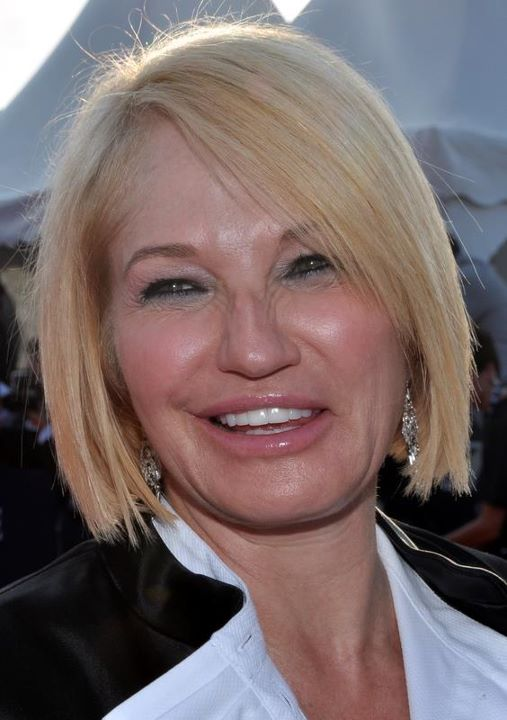
Ellen Barkin – Best Supporting Actress in a Series, Miniseries or Television Film

=== Best Actor – Drama Series ===
Jimmy Smits – NYPD Blue

- David Duchovny – The X-Files
- Dennis Franz – NYPD Blue
- Sam Waterston – Law & Order
- Michael T. Weiss – The Pretender

=== Best Actor – Musical or Comedy Series ===
Kelsey Grammer – Frasier

- Tim Allen – Home Improvement
- Drew Carey – The Drew Carey Show
- Michael J. Fox – Spin City
- Garry Shandling – The Larry Sanders Show

=== Best Actor – Miniseries or TV Film ===
Gary Sinise – George Wallace

- Armand Assante – The Odyssey
- Gabriel Byrne – Weapons of Mass Distraction
- Sidney Poitier – Mandela and de Klerk
- Ving Rhames – Don King: Only in America

=== Best Actress – Drama Series ===
Kate Mulgrew – Star Trek: Voyager

- Gillian Anderson – The X-Files
- Kim Delaney – NYPD Blue
- Julianna Margulies – ER
- Ally Walker – Profiler

=== Best Actress – Musical or Comedy Series ===
Tracey Ullman – Tracey Takes On...

- Jane Curtin – 3rd Rock from the Sun
- Ellen DeGeneres – Ellen
- Helen Hunt – Mad About You
- Brooke Shields – Suddenly Susan

=== Best Actress – Miniseries or TV Film ===
Jennifer Beals – The Twilight of the Golds (TIE)
Alfre Woodard – Miss Evers' Boys (TIE)

- Glenn Close – In the Gloaming
- Greta Scacchi – The Odyssey
- Meryl Streep – ...First Do No Harm

=== Best Miniseries or TV Film ===
Don King: Only in America

- Breast Men
- George Wallace
- Miss Evers' Boys
- The Odyssey
- Weapons of Mass Distraction

=== Best Series – Drama ===
NYPD Blue

- Homicide: Life on the Street
- Law & Order
- The Pretender
- The X-Files

=== Best Series – Musical or Comedy ===
Frasier

- The Drew Carey Show
- The Larry Sanders Show
- Mad About You
- Spin City

=== Best Supporting Actor – (Mini)Series or TV Film ===
Vondie Curtis-Hall – Don King: Only in America

- Jason Alexander – Cinderella
- Joe Don Baker – George Wallace
- Michael Caine – Mandela and de Klerk
- Ossie Davis – Miss Evers' Boys

=== Best Supporting Actress – (Mini)Series or TV Film ===
Ellen Barkin – Before Women Had Wings

- Louise Fletcher – Breast Men
- Bernadette Peters – Cinderella
- Mimi Rogers – Weapons of Mass Distraction
- Mare Winningham – George Wallace

== New Media winners and nominees ==
=== CD-ROM Entertainment ===
Blade Runner

- Hercules

== Awards breakdown ==
=== Film ===
Winners:

7 / 12 Titanic: Best Art Direction / Best Costume Design / Best Director & Editing / Best Film – Drama / Best Original Score & Original Song
3 / 6 As Good as It Gets: Best Actor & Actress & Film – Musical or Comedy
2 / 7 Boogie Nights: Best Supporting Actor & Actress – Drama
1 / 1 4 Little Girls: Best Documentary Film
1 / 1 The Apostle: Best Actor – Drama
1 / 1 Shall We Dance? (Shall We Dansu?): Best Foreign Language Film
1 / 2 Contact: Best Visual Effects
1 / 3 In & Out: Best Supporting Actress – Musical or Comedy
1 / 4 Mrs Brown: Best Actress – Drama
1 / 4 My Best Friend's Wedding: Best Supporting Actor – Musical or Comedy
1 / 5 Men in Black: Best Animated or Mixed Media Film
1 / 6 Good Will Hunting: Best Screenplay – Original
1 / 8 L.A. Confidential: Best Screenplay – Adapted
1 / 9 Amistad: Best Cinematography

Losers:

0 / 4 Anastasia, The Full Monty, The Wings of the Dove
0 / 3 Eve's Bayou, The Ice Storm
0 / 2 Starship Troopers, Wag the Dog

=== Television ===
Winners:

2 / 2 Frasier: Best Actor – Musical or Comedy Series / Best Series – Musical or Comedy
2 / 3 Don King: Only in America: Best Actor – Miniseries or TV Film / Best Supporting Actor – (Mini)Series or TV Film
2 / 4 NYPD Blue: Best Actor – Drama Series / Best Series – Drama
1 / 1 Before Women Had Wings: Best Supporting Actress – (Mini)Series or TV Film
1 / 1 Star Trek: Voyager: Best Actress – Drama Series
1 / 1 Tracey Takes On...: Best Actress – Musical or Comedy Series
1 / 1 The Twilight of the Golds: Best Actress – Miniseries or TV Film
1 / 3 Miss Evers' Boys: Best Actress – Miniseries or TV Film
1 / 4 George Wallace: Best Actor – Miniseries or TV Film

Losers:

0 / 3 The Odyssey, Weapons of Mass Distraction, The X-Files
0 / 2 Cinderella, The Drew Carey Show, The Larry Sanders Show, Law & Order, Mad About You, Mandela and de Klerk, The Pretender, Spin City
