= Ranch Romance (band) =

American country band

- Origin: Seattle, Washington
- Genres: Alternative Country, Western swing revival, and Americana
- Years active: 1989-1999
- Label: Sugar Hill Records
- Past members: Jo Miller; Nancy Katz; Barbara Lamb; Lisa Theo; Nova Karina Devonie; David Keenan

Ranch Romance was a western swing, alternative country and bluegrass band from Seattle, Washington consisting of vocalist and rhythm guitarist Jo Miller, upright bassist Nancy Katz, fiddler Barbara Lamb, mandolinist Lisa Theo, accordionist Nova Karina Devonie and guitarist, mandolinist and banjo player David Keenan.

The band's name was taken from a Western pulp fiction magazine published in the US in the 1930s called Ranch Romances.

"[i]n 1989, they issued their debut LP, Western Dream. After touring in support of k.d. lang, Theo left the band in 1991 and was replaced by accordionist Nova Karina Devonie and David Keenen on guitar, mandolin, and banjo. Lamb departed to attempt a solo career prior to the release of the second Ranch Romance effort, Blue Blazes; Flip City followed in 1993."

== Discography ==
=== Albums ===
Year	Album details
1990	Western Dream: Label: Sugar Hill Records
1991	Blue Blazes: Label: Sugar Hill Records
1993	Flip City: Label: Sugar Hill Records
