= Freedom (1981 film) =

- Genre: Drama
- Written by: Barbara Turner
- Directed by: Joseph Sargent
- Starring: Mare Winningham; Jennifer Warren; Tony Bill; Roy Thinnes
- Theme music composer: Billy Goldenberg
- Country of origin: United States
- Original language: English

Production
- Executive producers: Leonard Hill; Philip Mandelker
- Producer: Terry Morse Jr.
- Cinematography: Donald M. Morgan
- Editor: Benjamin A. Weissman
- Running time: 100 minutes
- Production company: Hill/Mandelker Films

Original release
- Network: ABC
- Release: May 18, 1981

Freedom is a 1981 American made-for-television drama film directed by Joseph Sargent and starring Mare Winningham, Jennifer Warren and Tony Bill. It originally premiered May 18, 1981 on ABC.

== Cast ==
- Mare Winningham as Libby Bellow
- Jennifer Warren as Rachel Bellow
- Tony Bill as Richard
- Roy Thinnes as Michael
- Peter Horton as Bill
- Heather McAdam as Jessie
- Eloy Casados as Ron
- J. Pat O'Malley as Papa J.
- Tara King as Sherri
- Noelle North as Amanda
- Taylor Negron as Brett

== Reception ==
The New York Times said, "Mare Winningham and Jennifer Warren are two very good reasons to watch Freedom tonight on ABC-TV, a family drama that is well directed, believable and often touching."

== Home media ==
Multicom Entertainment Group released the film worldwide in 2017
