= George Wallace (film) =

1997 U.S. television film

- DVD cover
- Genre: Biographical
- Based on: Wallace: The Classic Portrait of Alabama Governor George Wallace by Marshall Frady
- Screenplay by: Paul Monash; Marshall Frady
- Story by: Paul Monash
- Directed by: John Frankenheimer
- Starring: Gary Sinise; Mare Winningham; Clarence Williams III; Joe Don Baker; Angelina Jolie; Terry Kinney; William Sanderson; Mark Rolston; Tracy Fraim; Skipp Sudduth; Ron Perkins; Mark Valley
- Theme music composer: Gary Chang
- Original language: English

Production
- Executive producer: Mark Carliner
- Producers: John Frankenheimer; Julian Krainin
- Cinematography: Alan Caso
- Editor: Tony Gibbs
- Running time: 178 minutes
- Production company: TNT Original

Original release
- Network: TNT
- Release: August 24, 1997

George Wallace is a 1997 biographical television film, produced and directed by John Frankenheimer and starring Gary Sinise as George Wallace, the 45th governor of Alabama. The teleplay, written by Marshall Frady and Paul Monash, is based on the 1996 biography Wallace: The Classic Portrait of Alabama Governor George Wallace by Frady. Mare Winningham, Clarence Williams III, Joe Don Baker, Angelina Jolie, Terry Kinney, William Sanderson, Mark Rolston, Tracy Fraim, Skipp Sudduth, Ron Perkins, and Mark Valley also star.

Sinise reprised his role as George Wallace in Frankenheimer's 2002 television film Path to War, about the Johnson administration's entry into the Vietnam War.

George Wallace premiered on TNT in August 1997, being broadcast in two parts. It was highly praised by critics and received various accolades: including Primetime Emmy Awards for Outstanding Directing (Frankenheimer), Outstanding Lead Actor (Sinise), and Outstanding Supporting Actress (Winningham), and Golden Globe Awards for Best Miniseries or Television Film and Best Supporting Actress (Jolie).

== Plot ==
George Wallace portrays the political life of a complex man. Initially an ordinary Southern judge, Wallace transforms himself to achieve political success and glory, becoming one of the most reviled political figures in the U.S. Finally, a failed assassination attempt—which leaves him paralyzed and in pain—leads him to realize what he has become.

The film follows the story of Wallace's life from the 1950s, when he was a circuit court judge in Barbour County, to his tenure as the most powerful Governor in Alabama's history. The movie depicts his symbolic "Stand in the Schoolhouse Door", where Wallace attempted to block black students from entering the University of Alabama. It details his stance on racial segregation in Alabama at the time, which proved popular with his white constituents, and also depicts Wallace's rise as a presidential hopeful. This eventually leads to his surprise victory in several states during the 1968 presidential election, followed by his attempted assassination four years later.

== Cast ==
- Gary Sinise as George Wallace
- Mare Winningham as Lurleen Wallace
- Clarence Williams III as Archie
- Joe Don Baker as Jim "Big Jim" Folsom
- Angelina Jolie as Cornelia Wallace
- Terry Kinney as Billy Watson
- William Sanderson as T.Y. Odum
- Mark Rolston as Ricky Brickle
- Tracy Fraim as Gerald Wallace
- Skipp Sudduth as Al Lingo
- Ron Perkins as Nicholas Katzenbach
- Mark Valley as US Attorney General Robert F. Kennedy
- Scott Brantley as Arthur Bremer
- Kathryn Erbe as Mrs. Folsom
- Steve Harris as Neal
- Bobby Kirby as James Hood
- Ketema Nelson as Vivian Malone

== Production ==
Principal photography began on 13 January 1997.

== Reception ==
The New York Times' Caryn James, wrote that events were "recreated with startling veracity and tension in the two-part mini-series called simply George Wallace." James wrote that Sinise was "amazing" and Mare Winningham was "extraordinary."

The Associated Press stated that the film's version of Cornelia Wallace was depicted as "a shallow sex kitten" and therefore Cornelia Wallace had criticism towards the portrayal.

== Awards and nominations ==
George Wallace received award nominations: including eight Primetime Emmy Awards (winning three), four Golden Globe Awards (winning two), two Screen Actors Guild Awards (winning one), four Satellite Awards (winning one), nine CableACE Awards (winning four), a Directors Guild of America Award, and a Writers Guild of America Award. Also winning an American Cinema Editors Award, an American Society of Cinematographers Award, an Art Directors Guild Award, and receiving a Peabody Award.

Year	Award	Category	Nominee(s)	Result	Ref.
1997	CableACE Awards	Miniseries	Mark Carliner, John Frankenheimer, Julian Krainin, and Ethel Winant	Won	
1997	CableACE Awards	Actor in a Movie or Miniseries	Gary Sinise	Won	
1997	CableACE Awards	Supporting Actor in a Movie or Miniseries	Joe Don Baker	Nominated	
1997	CableACE Awards	Supporting Actress in a Movie or Miniseries	Angelina Jolie	Nominated	
1997	CableACE Awards	Directing a Movie or Miniseries	John Frankenheimer	Won	
1997	CableACE Awards	Writing a Movie or Miniseries	Paul Monash and Marshall Frady	Nominated	
1997	CableACE Awards	Art Direction in a Dramatic Special or Serires/Movie or Miniseries	Michael Z. Hanan, Charles M. Lagola, and Douglas A. Mowat	Nominated	
1997	CableACE Awards	Editing a Dramatic Special or Series/Movie or Miniseries	Antony Gibbs	Nominated	
1997	CableACE Awards	Makeup	Janeen Schreyer, John E. Jackson, Matthew W. Mungle, Patricia Androff, and Jamie Kelman	Won	
1997	Peabody Awards		TNT and a Mark Carliner Production	Won	
1998	American Cinema Editors Awards	Best Edited Episode from a Television Mini-Series	Antony Gibbs (for "Part 2")	Won	
1998	American Society of Cinematographers Awards	Outstanding Achievement in Cinematography in Miniseries	Alan Caso	Won	
1998	Art Directors Guild Awards	Excellence in Production Design Award – Television Movie or Mini-Series	Michael Z. Hanan, Charles M. Lagola, and Arlan Jay Vetter	Won	
1998	Artios Awards	Best Casting for Mini-Series	Iris Grossman	Won	
1998	Directors Guild of America Awards	Outstanding Directorial Achievement in Movies for Television or Miniseries	John Frankenheimer	Nominated	
1998	Golden Globe Awards	Best Miniseries or Motion Picture Made for Television		Won	
1998	Golden Globe Awards	Best Actor in a Miniseries or Motion Picture Made for Television	Gary Sinise	Nominated	
1998	Golden Globe Awards	Best Supporting Actress in a Series, Miniseries or Motion Picture Made for Television	Angelina Jolie	Won	
1998	Golden Globe Awards	Best Supporting Actress in a Series, Miniseries or Motion Picture Made for Television	Mare Winningham	Nominated	
1998	Golden Reel Awards	Best Sound Editing – Television Mini-Series – Effects & Foley	Brady Schwartz	Nominated	
1998	Humanitas Prize	PBS/Cable Television	Paul Monash and Marshall Frady	Won	
1998	Online Film & Television Association Awards	Best Miniseries		Nominated	
1998	Online Film & Television Association Awards	Best Actor in a Motion Picture or Miniseries	Gary Sinise	Nominated	
1998	Online Film & Television Association Awards	Best Direction of a Motion Picture or Miniseries		Nominated	
1998	Online Film & Television Association Awards	Best Writing of a Motion Picture or Miniseries		Nominated	
1998	Online Film & Television Association Awards	Best Ensemble in a Motion Picture or Miniseries		Nominated	
1998	Online Film & Television Association Awards	Best Editing in a Motion Picture or Miniseries		Nominated	
1998	Online Film & Television Association Awards	Best Lighting in a Motion Picture or Miniseries		Nominated	
1998	Online Film & Television Association Awards	Best Music in a Motion Picture or Miniseries		Nominated	
1998	Online Film & Television Association Awards	Best New Titles Sequence in a Motion Picture or Miniseries		Nominated	
1998	Primetime Emmy Awards	Outstanding Miniseries	Mark Carliner, John Frankenheimer, Julian Krainin, Ethel Winant, Mitch Engel, and James Sbardellati	Nominated	
1998	Primetime Emmy Awards	Outstanding Lead Actor in a Miniseries or a Movie	Gary Sinise	Won	
1998	Primetime Emmy Awards	Outstanding Supporting Actress in a Miniseries or a Movie	Angelina Jolie	Nominated	
1998	Primetime Emmy Awards	Outstanding Supporting Actress in a Miniseries or a Movie	Mare Winningham	Won	
1998	Primetime Emmy Awards	Outstanding Directing for a Miniseries or a Movie	John Frankenheimer	Won	
1998	Primetime Emmy Awards	Outstanding Casting for a Miniseries or a Movie	Iris Grossman	Nominated	
1998	Primetime Emmy Awards	Outstanding Cinematography for a Miniseries or a Movie	Alan Caso (for "Part 1")	Nominated	
1998	Primetime Emmy Awards	Outstanding Makeup for a Miniseries, Movie or a Special	Janeen Schreyer, Patricia Androff, Jamie Kelman, Cheryl Ann Nick, Keith Sayer, John E. Jackson, and Matthew W. Mungle	Nominated	
1998	Satellite Awards	Best Miniseries or Motion Picture Made for Television		Nominated	
1998	Satellite Awards	Best Actor in a Miniseries or a Motion Picture Made for Television	Gary Sinise	Won	
1998	Satellite Awards	Best Actor in a Supporting Role in a Miniseries or a Motion Picture Made for Television	Joe Don Baker	Nominated	
1998	Satellite Awards	Best Actress in a Supporting Role in a Miniseries or a Motion Picture Made for Television	Mare Winningham	Nominated	
1998	Screen Actors Guild Awards	Outstanding Performance by a Male Actor in a Miniseries or Television Movie	Gary Sinise	Won	
1998	Screen Actors Guild Awards	Outstanding Performance by a Female Actor in a Miniseries or Television Movie	Mare Winningham	Nominated	
1998	Writers Guild of America Awards	Long Form – Adapted	Paul Monash and Marshall Frady; Based on the book Wallace: The; Classic Portrait of Alabama Governor; George Wallace by Marshall Frady	Nominated	
1999	Costume Designers Guild Awards	Excellence in Costume Design for Television	May Routh	Nominated	

== See also ==
- Civil rights movement in popular culture
