= Miracle Mile (film) =

1988 film by Steve De Jarnatt

- Theatrical release poster
- Directed by: Steve De Jarnatt
- Written by: Steve De Jarnatt
- Produced by: John Daly; Derek Gibson
- Starring: Anthony Edwards; Mare Winningham
- Cinematography: Theo van de Sande
- Edited by: Stephen Semel; Kathie Weaver
- Music by: Tangerine Dream
- Production company: Miracle Mile Productions
- Distributed by: Hemdale Film Corporation
- Release dates: September 11, 1988 (TIFF); May 19, 1989 (United States)
- Running time: 87 minutes
- Country: United States
- Language: English
- Budget: $3.7-4 million
- Box office: $1.1 million

Miracle Mile is a 1988 American apocalyptic thriller film written and directed by Steve De Jarnatt. The film stars Anthony Edwards and Mare Winningham. Its plot depicts the panic surrounding a supposed doomsday brought on by a sudden outbreak of war and its oncoming nuclear holocaust, taking place in a single day and mostly in real-time. The title is named after the Miracle Mile neighborhood of Los Angeles where most of the events take place.

== Plot ==
Harry Washello and Julie Peters meet at the La Brea Tar Pits and immediately fall in love. They spend the afternoon together and arrange to meet again at midnight. However, due to a freak accident, a power failure prevents Harry's alarm from going off until much later. Julie cannot reach Harry, so she leaves for home. When Harry awakes that night, he realizes what has happened and rushes to Julie's workplace, arriving at 4 a.m. Harry tries calling Julie on a payphone but only reaches her answering machine, where he leaves an apology. The phone rings again, and Harry answers to hear a frantic man named Chip urgently warn that nuclear war will break out in less than 70 minutes. When Harry asks who is calling, Chip realizes he has dialed the wrong area code. He pleads with Harry to call his father and apologize for some past wrong before he is interrupted and presumably shot dead. An unfamiliar voice picks up the phone and tells Harry to forget everything he heard before disconnecting.

Harry, confused and not entirely convinced the information is authentic, wanders back into the diner and tells the other customers what he has heard. As the patrons scoff at his story, one of them, a businesswoman named Landa, calls politicians in Washington and finds they are all suddenly heading for "the extreme Southern Hemisphere". She verifies that the launch codes Chip mentioned are real and, convinced of the danger, immediately charters private jets from LAX to a compound in a region of Antarctica with no rainfall. Most customers and staff leave with her in the owner's delivery van. When the owner refuses to make any stops, Harry, unwilling to leave without Julie, arranges to meet the group at the airport and jumps from the truck.

Harry is helped and hindered by various strangers, who are initially unaware of the impending apocalypse. In the process, he inadvertently causes several deaths, which leaves him deeply shaken. When he finds Julie and tells her what is happening, she notes that there has been no confirmation of the attack. Desperate to reach the airport and not having a car, Harry finds a helicopter pilot and tells him to meet them on the roof of the Mutual Benefit Life Building, where Landa orders a helicopter and a large amount of supplies to be delivered. Julie has also tried to find a pilot on her own, and in the moments it takes to find her, Los Angeles descends into violent chaos. There is still no confirmation that any of this is real, and Harry wonders if he has sparked a massive false panic in the example of Chicken Little. However, when he uses a phone booth to contact Chip's father, he reaches a man who says his son works in a missile silo in North Dakota. Harry tries to pass on the message he was given, but the man hangs up before Harry finishes.

When they reach the top of the Mutual Benefit building, they find the pad empty, with only Landa's drunk co-worker on the roof. Any doubt about a false alarm is eliminated when a missile streaks across the sky. As they fear the end, the helicopter suddenly returns with the pilot badly wounded but fulfilling his promise to come back for them. After they lift off from the roof, several warheads hit, and the nuclear E.M.P. from the detonations causes the helicopter to crash into the La Brea Tar Pits. As the helicopter sinks and the cabin fills with natural asphalt tar, Harry tries to comfort a hysterical Julie by saying their fossils will someday be found and probably put in a museum, or that they might take a direct hit and be turned into diamonds. Julie, accepting her fate, calms down and takes comfort in Harry's words, and the movie fades out as the tar fills the compartment. A final explosion seems to imply a direct hit.

== Cast ==
- Anthony Edwards as Harry Washello
- Mare Winningham as Julie Peters
- Mykelti Williamson as Wilson (credited as Mykel T. Williamson)
- Denise Crosby as Landa
- Kelly Jo Minter as Charlotta (credited as Kelly Minter)

== Production ==
Before Miracle Mile was made, its production had been legendary in Hollywood for ten years. In 1983, it had been chosen by American Film magazine as one of the ten best unmade screenplays. Steve De Jarnatt wrote it just out of the American Film Institute for Warner Brothers with the hope of directing it as well. The studio wanted to make it on a bigger scale and did not want to entrust the project with a first-time director like De Jarnatt.

Miracle Mile spent three years in production limbo until De Jarnatt optioned it himself, buying the script for $25,000. He rewrote it and the studio offered him $400,000 to buy it back. He turned them down. When he shopped it around to other studios, they balked at the mix of romance and nuclear war and the film's downbeat ending. At one point, it nearly became the script for the eventual separately made Twilight Zone: The Movie. Before Anthony Edwards was cast, production nearly began with both Nicolas Cage and Kurt Russell. Of the script, Edwards said, "It scared the hell out of me. It really made me angry too ... I just couldn't believe that somebody had written this." John Daly of Hemdale Films gave De Jarnatt $3.7 million to make the film.

Edwards later recalled:

That was a script that everybody wanted to make, but they wanted him to change the ending. It was this great adventure, but they wanted it to have a happy ending. But he stuck it out, and luckily he stuck it out long enough that I was old enough to play the part. [Laughs.] So I got to do it, and we did it at a time when there really was no green screen for special effects. You had to shoot what was there. It's amazing how dated that film looks now, because of our ability to do things technically now. I mean, it really looks antiquated. Mare Winningham is one of the greatest actresses ever. It was eight weeks of night shooting, though, so you'd be driving home from work at, like, 6 in the morning, having had a wrap beer, and then you're suddenly going, "Oh my God, what do people think of somebody having a beer at 6 in the morning whenever everyone else is on their way to work? [Laughs.]

The following locations in Los Angeles were used: Johnie's Coffee Shop; La Brea Tar Pits; Miracle Mile District; Pan-Pacific Auditorium in the Fairfax District.

== Soundtrack ==
=== 1989 release ===
Miracle Mile
- 1989 CD cover

Soundtrack album by Tangerine Dream
- Released: 26 May 1989
- Recorded: 1988
- Genre: Electronic
- Length: 41:13
- Label: Private Music
- Producers: Edgar Froese; Paul Haslinger

Tangerine Dream chronology
Optical Race (1989)	Miracle Mile (1989)	Lily on the Beach (1989)

Professional ratings
Review scores
Source	Rating
Q	3/5 stars

Miracle Mile is the 36th major release and 12th soundtrack album by Tangerine Dream. Monty Smith in Q magazine described it as a "euphonious mixture of gloomy melodic synthesizers and hypnotically insistent drum machines".

==== Track listing ====
No.	Title	Length
1.	"Teetering Scales"	3:39
2.	"One for the Books"	3:04
3.	"After the Call"	5:11
4.	"On the Spur of the Moment"	3:00
5.	"All of a Dither"	3:24
6.	"Final Statement"	3:14
7.	"In Julie's Eyes"	3:15
8.	"Running Out of Time"	3:30
9.	"If It's All Over"	4:34
10.	"People in the News"	5:10
11.	"Museum Walk"	3:12

==== Personnel ====
- Edgar Froese
- Paul Haslinger

=== 2017 release ===
The complete score in film sequence order was released in 2017 representing the score as delivered by Tangerine Dream to the director, essentially as heard in the film's mix with tracks 14 through 23 containing music effects.

Music From The Motion Picture Miracle Mile (Original Score)

Film score by Tangerine Dream
- Released: 2017
- Recorded: 1988
- Genre: Soundtrack
- Length: 58:52
- Label: Dragon's Domain
- Producers: Edgar Froese, Paul Haslinger

==== Track listing ====
CD1: The Complete Film Score

No.	Title	Length
1.	"Galaxy/Tarpits"	4:47
2.	"Pier/Trolley Montage"	1:55
3.	"Cigarette, Bird, Sleep"	3:12
4.	"Car Drive/Phone Call"	2:46
5.	"Landa"	3:16
6.	"Truck Scene"	4:50
7.	"Wilson's Car/Gas Station"	3:28
8.	"Police Car/Julie's Bedroom"	3:41
9.	"Through The Dark/Run Across The Street"	3:37
10.	"Gym"	0:47
11.	"Gym: In-Exterior/Phone Call Theme"	4:02
12.	"Helicopter/Back to the Tarpits"	5:07
13.	"End Title"	4:54
14.	"MX-01"	4:47
15.	"MX-02"	2:14
16.	"MX-03"	1:00
17.	"MX-04"	0:51
18.	"MX-05"	1:07
19.	"MX-06"	0:36
20.	"MX-07"	0:51
21.	"MX-08"	0:53
22.	"MX-09"	0:42
23.	"MX-10"	40:55

CD2: The Soundtrack Album

No.	Title	Length
1.	"Teetering Scales"	3:39
2.	"One for the Books"	3:03
3.	"After the Call"	5:11
4.	"On the Spur of the Moment"	3:01
5.	"All of a Dither"	3:24
6.	"Final Statement"	3:15
7.	"In Julie's Eyes"	3:15
8.	"Running Out of Time"	3:30
9.	"If It's All Over"	4:34
10.	"People in the News"	5:10
11.	"Museum Walk"	3:12

==== Personnel ====
- Edgar Froese
- Paul Haslinger

== Reception ==
Miracle Mile received generally positive reviews among critics. The review aggregator Rotten Tomatoes reported that 91% of critics gave the film a positive review, based on 32 reviews and the consensus: "Miracle Mile brings about its small-scale doomsday tale with achingly rich bleakness and hypnotically nightmarish fervor."

Roger Ebert praised the film, claiming it had a "diabolical effectiveness" and a sense of "real terror". In her review for the Washington Post, Rita Kempley wrote: "It seems [De Jarnatt]'s not committed to his story or his characters, but to the idea that he is saying something profound—which he isn't." Stephen Holden, in The New York Times, wrote: "As Harry and Julie, Mr. Edwards and Ms. Winningham make an unusually refreshing pair." In his review for the Boston Globe, Jay Carr called it: "... a messy film, but it's got energy, urgency, conviction and heat and you won't soon forget it." British film and television critic Charlie Brooker, in an article for the BAFTA web site written in September 2008, awarded Miracle Mile the honor of having the "Biggest Lurch of Tone" of any film he had ever seen.

=== Awards ===
Wins:

- Sitges - Catalan International Film Festival: Best Special Effects; 1989.
- Saturn Award: Saturn Award for Best Classic Film DVD Release; 2016.

Nominations:

- Sitges - Catalan International Film Festival: Nominated, Best Film, Steve De Jarnatt; 1989
- Sundance Film Festival: Grand Jury Prize, Dramatic, Steve De Jarnatt; 1989.
- Independent Spirit Awards: Best Screenplay, Steve De Jarnatt; Best Supporting Female, Mare Winningham; 1990.

== See also ==
- List of apocalyptic films
- List of films about nuclear issues
- List of nuclear holocaust fiction
- Nuclear weapons in popular culture
- Survival film
