= Mare Winningham =

American actress, singer-songwriter (born 1959)

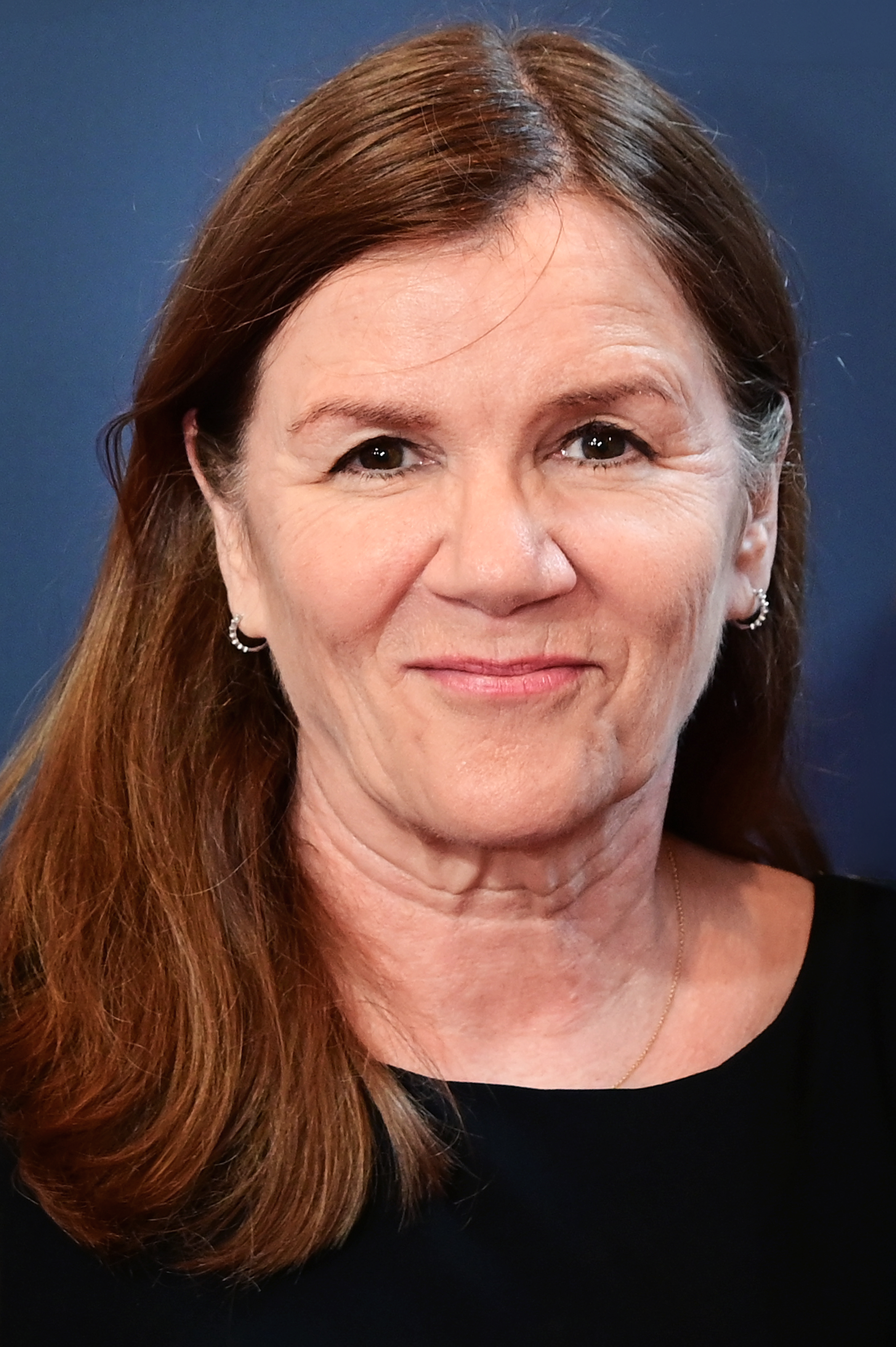
- Winningham in 2026
- Born: Mary Megan Winningham; May 16, 1959 (age 67); Phoenix, Arizona, U.S.
- Occupations: Actress; singer-songwriter
- Years active: 1976–present
- Spouses: A Martinez (m. 1981; div. 1981): William Mapel (m. 198?; div. 1994); Jason Trucco (m. ??; div. ??); Anthony Edwards (m. 2021)
- Children: 5
- Father: Sam Winningham
- Musical career
- Genres: Bluegrass; blues; folk

Mary Megan "Mare" Winningham (born May 16, 1959) is an American actress and singer-songwriter. Her accolades include two Primetime Emmy Awards, alongside nominations for an Academy Award, two Golden Globe Awards, and two Tony Awards.

An eight-time Emmy Award nominee, she won Outstanding Supporting Actress in a Miniseries or Movie for Amber Waves in 1980 and George Wallace in 1998. She was also nominated for the Academy Award for Best Supporting Actress for the 1995 film Georgia.

Winningham's other film and TV roles include The Thorn Birds (1983), St. Elmo's Fire (1985), Miracle Mile (1988), Turner & Hooch (1989), The War (1994), Dandelion (2004), Swing Vote (2008), Brothers (2009), Mildred Pierce (2011), Hatfields & McCoys (2012), and appeared in American Horror Story for four seasons: Coven (2013), Freak Show (2014), Hotel (2015–16), and Cult (2017). She was cast as Meredith Grey's stepmother Susan Grey on Grey's Anatomy (2006–2007) and as Cherry Lockhart, Cole Lockhart's mother for seasons 1–2 and 4 of The Affair (2014–2016; 2018).

Winningham made her New York stage debut in the 2007 Off-Broadway musical 10 Million Miles, for which she received a Drama Desk Award nomination. She made her Broadway debut in the 2013 revival of Picnic. In 2014, she was nominated for the Tony Award for Best Featured Actress in a Play for the original Broadway production of Casa Valentina.

== Early life ==
Winningham was born in Phoenix, Arizona, and raised in Northridge, California. She is the daughter of Marilyn Jean (née Maloney) and Sam Neal Winningham. She has three brothers and one sister. Her father was football coach, athletic director and later the chairman of the Department of Physical Education at California State University, Northridge (CSUN), and her mother was an English teacher and college counselor at Monroe High School and Grant High School. She credits her first interest in acting to seeing an interview with Kym Karath (who played Gretl in The Sound of Music) on Art Linkletter's television show House Party when she was five or six years old.

Winningham attended Andasol Avenue Elementary School, where her favorite activities included drama and playing the guitar and drums. She took the extended drama option at Patrick Henry Junior High School and continued to study over her summer vacations at CSUN's Teenage Drama Workshop. It was at this time that she adopted the nickname "Mare". Her mother arranged for her to go to Chatsworth High School. In grade 12, Winningham starred in a production of The Sound of Music, playing the part of Maria, opposite classmate Kevin Spacey as Captain Von Trapp. Her high school boyfriend was Val Kilmer. She graduated co-valedictorian (with Spacey) of her high school class in 1977.

== Career ==
=== Acting ===
Winningham began her career as a singer-songwriter. In 1976 and 1977, she got her break singing The Beatles song "Here, There and Everywhere" on The Gong Show. Although Winningham received no record contracts as result of the appearance, she was signed to an acting contract by Hollywood agent Meyer Mishkin, and received her Screen Actor's Guild card for doing three lines in an episode of James at 15. That year she was offered a role on Young Pioneers and Young Pioneers Christmas, pilots for the short-lived 1978 drama The Young Pioneers. Though the series ended with just three episodes being broadcast, a number of television projects followed, including parts on Police Woman in 1978 and Starsky and Hutch in 1979. Later that same year, she played the role of teenage outcast Jenny Flowers in the made-for-TV film The Death of Ocean View Park.

In 1980, Winningham starred in Off the Minnesota Strip playing a young prostitute. She then won an Emmy Award for Best Supporting Actress in a Miniseries or a Movie for her role in the critically acclaimed Amber Waves, a television film about a rough farmer (Dennis Weaver) who finds he is dying of cancer. In that year, she also broke into feature films with One Trick Pony, starring Paul Simon. In 1983, Winningham was nominated for a Canadian Genie Award for her work in the futuristic 1981 drama Threshold, and appeared in the 1983 epic miniseries The Thorn Birds, in which she played Justine O'Neill. In 1984, she starred as Helen Keller in Helen Keller: The Miracle Continues.

Winningham achieved greater fame co-starring in St. Elmo's Fire (1985), alongside the other original "brat pack" alumni. Despite the film's success, she chose not to cash in on her teen idol status, and soon returned to television in the Hallmark Hall of Fame movie, Love Is Never Silent, for which she received an Emmy nomination. Another well-known and well-received performance was as a homeless young mother in the television movie God Bless the Child. Winningham finished the 1980s with two Hollywood films: the nuclear disaster drama, Miracle Mile (1988), for which she received an Independent Spirit Award nomination in 1989, and the Tom Hanks vehicle Turner & Hooch in 1989. In 1988, Winningham also starred in the Los Angeles stage production of Hurlyburly with Sean Penn and Danny Aiello.

In the early 1990s, she returned to film for 1994's all-star Wyatt Earp and the family drama The War, both starring Kevin Costner. 1995 brought Georgia, a thoughtful character study of two sisters (Winningham and Jennifer Jason Leigh), which earned Winningham Screen Actors Guild and Academy Award nominations. Two years later, she starred opposite Gary Sinise in George Wallace, for which she garnered her Golden Globe Award nomination and won an Emmy Award. Winningham reunited with Sinise twelve years later on CSI: NY in the season 5 episode Greater Good.

She made acclaimed appearances on the series ER and Law & Order: Special Victims Unit, as well as appearances in the 2001 television project Sally Hemings opposite Sam Neill and the short-lived David E. Kelley series The Brotherhood of Poland, New Hampshire. Also in 2001, she appeared in the made-for-TV movie Snap Decision with Felicity Huffman. She also appeared in the independent film Dandelion, which was a staple of film festivals worldwide between 2003 and 2004 and had a limited American release in October 2005.

In 2006, she landed the role of Susan Grey on the ABC drama Grey's Anatomy where she played the stepmother of one of the main characters, Dr. Meredith Grey. Her character was killed off in May 2007. In 2006, Winningham voiced the audio version of Stephen King's Lisey's Story. In 2007, she voiced Alice Hoffman's Skylight Confessions. In 2010, Winningham starred in an episode of Cold Case as main character Lilly Rush's stepmother, Celeste Cooper. In 2011 she appeared in the fourth episode of Torchwood: Miracle Day as character Ellis Hartley Monroe. She also starred in miniseries Mildred Pierce and Hatfields & McCoys and garnered another two Emmy nominations. In 2012, she appeared Off-Broadway as Beth, the mother in an intellectual, though dysfunctional, British family, in the award-winning comic-drama Tribes by Nina Raine. In 2021 she appeared in Dopesick on Hulu with Michael Keaton.

In 2022, she was nominated for a second Tony for her leading performance in Girl from the North Country. From November 2025 until February 2026, Winningham will play Marthy Owen in a revival of Eugene O'Neill's play Anna Christie alongside Michelle Williams, Tom Sturridge, and Brian d'Arcy James at St. Ann's Warehouse.

=== Music ===
Winningham has alternated her film career with a music career, and has used some of her films as a way to showcase her singing. She can be heard singing a few bars of "Me and Bobby McGee" in One Trick Pony. In 1981, she played a teenage runaway with an aspiration to become a singer in the TV film Freedom, and sang six songs in the film, all written by Janis Ian. She appeared as a club singer in the film Teresa's Tattoo, and sang three songs in the film Georgia.

Winningham has recorded four albums: What Might Be (1992) on the Bay Cities label, Lonesomers (1997) produced by Carla Olson on the Razor and Tie label, and Refuge Rock Sublime (2007) on the Craig & Co. label. Lonesomers is a folksy album dealing with relationship issues. The country/bluegrass/Jewish/folk songs on Refuge Rock Sublime deal mostly with her recent conversion to Judaism, and include the tracks, "What Would David Do," "A Convert Jig" and the Israeli national anthem "Hatikva". Winningham released her fourth album What's Left Behind independently on digital outlets in March 2014.

== Personal life ==
Winningham has been married four times and divorced three. In the early 1980s, she was briefly married to actor A Martinez. They starred in the miniseries The Young Pioneers. After their divorce, she married television technical advisor William Mapel, with whom she had five children: Riley Mapel was the oldest son (b. 1981) and died by suicide in 2005; Patrick Mapel (b. 1983); Jack Mapel (b. 1985); the only daughter Calla Louise Mapel (b. 1987) and Happy Atticus Mapel (b. 1988). The marriage ended in 1994. Winningham later married and divorced artist Jason Trucco. At the end of 2021, she and long-time friend and fellow actor Anthony Edwards eloped. The two have known each other for 35 years.

Winningham was raised a Roman Catholic. She converted to Judaism in her early 40s as a personal decision having nothing to do with a marriage, and is an observant Jew.

== Discography ==
- What Might Be (1992)
- Georgia: Original Soundtrack (1995)
- Lonesomers (1997)
- Refuge Rock Sublime (2007)
- What's Left Behind (2014)
- Live at Café Carlyle (with The Brothers Crouch) (2020)
- Girl from the North Country Original Broadway Cast Recording (2020)
