= Georgia (1995 film) =

1995 film by Ulu Grosbard

- Poster
- Directed by: Ulu Grosbard
- Written by: Barbara Turner
- Produced by: Ulu Grosbard; Barbara Turner; Jennifer Jason Leigh
- Starring: Jennifer Jason Leigh; Mare Winningham; Ted Levine; Max Perlich; John Doe; John C. Reilly; Tom Bower
- Cinematography: Jan Kiesser
- Edited by: Elizabeth Kling
- Distributed by: Miramax Films
- Release dates: May 19, 1995 (Cannes); December 8, 1995 (United States)
- Running time: 115 minutes
- Country: United States
- Language: English
- Box office: $1.1 million

Georgia is a 1995 American drama film directed by Ulu Grosbard. It follows a barroom punk singer (Jennifer Jason Leigh) who has a complicated relationship with her older sister (Mare Winningham).

Georgia won the Grand Prix of the Americas Award for Best Picture at the Montreal World Film Festival. Leigh received Best Actress honors at the Montreal World Film Festival and the New York Film Critics Circle for her performance, while Winningham received an Independent Spirit Award for Best Supporting Actress as well as Best Supporting Actress nominations at the Academy Awards and from the Screen Actors Guild.

== Plot ==
Georgia Flood is a successful folk music singer who is happily married and a mother of two. Her younger, unstable sister Sadie also sings but is less successful as a punk rock vocalist. After a touring gig with a blues singer goes awry, Sadie arrives at her sister’s Seattle-area farm, which happens to be their childhood home, and says she’s going to stay in town.

To get her career back on track again, Sadie asks her ex-boyfriend Bobby if she can return as the singer for his band. Bobby is reluctant to take her on due to her history of drug use, but relents. Sadie sings with the band at dive bars and a local bowling alley, but continues to abuse alcohol and heroin. She befriends Herman, the band's drummer and a fellow heroin addict. During a performance at a Jewish wedding, Sadie, disoriented from taking a bathroom swig of Nyquil, blanks out mid-song, forcing another band member to take over for her. Herman is eventually kicked out the band for his drug use.

While delivering groceries and liquor to Sadie at her motel room, a young man named Axel tells her he's a fan and expresses his admiration for her. They begin a relationship and soon get married. Axel, wanting Sadie to get out of the rut she’s in, asks Georgia if she can do something to help her. Georgia considers it, though she is clearly weary from her sister's continual dependence on her.

At a benefit concert, Georgia invites Sadie onstage to sing the Van Morrison song "Take Me Back" solo. The set is a painful one where Sadie is intoxicated, off-key, and straining but her raw passion for the song comes through. Georgia comes onstage and sings with her to "save" the performance. On the tense car ride home, things come to a head between the sisters when Sadie protests Georgia's joining her onstage. After an ultimatum, Sadie gets out of the car and hitchhikes back to her motel room with Axel.

Georgia’s husband Jake suggests that his wife is being too hard on Sadie and doesn’t realize the difficulties of living in the shadow of a successful sibling. Soon after, Axel, exasperated from Sadie’s self-destruction and substance abuse, says he is going to visit his mom who is ill. Though Axel reassures her he’ll come back, Sadie realizes he is breaking up with her.

Sadie tries to look for a new gig and housing from Chasman, her old manager. Chasman refuses, saying he won't make enough money representing her. However, he offers her drugs, and the two get high together. In Oregon and in a state of drug withdrawal, a strung out Sadie tries to board a flight back to Seattle but is denied because she isn’t wearing shoes. She makes a scene at the airport until a passenger lends her his sneakers. When Sadie arrives in Seattle, Georgia arrives and takes her to a rehab center, where she is put through detox.

During Sadie’s treatment, the sisters slowly reconcile. Her bandmate Clay comes to visit her and sadly informs her that Herman overdosed while she was away. After her hospital stay, Georgia lets Sadie recover in her house. Some time later, the sisters have a difficult conversation on the porch. After Sadie snidely accuses Georgia of being emotionless, Georgia finally admits what she didn’t have the heart to say before: Sadie's constant need to be the center of attention is exhausting to everyone around her, and while she tries, she can't sing. Hurt, Sadie replies, "You wish."

The film ends with Sadie singing "Hard Times Come Again No More" with her band at a Portland bar. At a concert, Georgia is singing the same song to a large roaring crowd. Accepting applause from a small crowd, Sadie says, "No one does that song better than my sister."

== Cast ==
- Jennifer Jason Leigh as Sadie Flood
  - Nicole Donahoo as young Sadie
- Mare Winningham as Georgia Flood
- Ted Levine as Jake
- Max Perlich as Axel Goldman
- John Doe as Bobby
- John C. Reilly as Herman
- Jimmy Witherspoon as Trucker
- Jason Carter as Chasman
- Tom Bower as Erwin Flood
- Smokey Hormel as Leland
- Jimmy Z as Clay
- Jo Miller as Jo Miller
- Tony Marsico as Paul
- Jamian Briar as Andrew Flood
- Rachel Rasco as Mish Flood

== Production ==
The film was a highly personal project for Jennifer Jason Leigh and Mare Winningham. Leigh's mother, Barbara Turner, wrote the screenplay; Leigh and Turner co-produced it along with director Ulu Grosbard; and Winningham, a longtime friend who had been Leigh's camp counselor during their teen years, co-starred.

The music in the film consists of 13 songs; to create a realistic effect, Leigh and Winningham were both filmed singing live. The 13 songs included covers of songs by Gladys Knight & the Pips, Elvis Costello and Van Morrison. In the talked-about centerpiece of the film, Sadie drunkenly performs a raw, grueling cover of Morrison's "Take Me Back" in a ragged Janis Joplin-style gut howl at an AIDS benefit concert.

John Doe of the band X plays a supporting role and performed as a member of Sadie's band.

== Soundtrack ==
Georgia

Soundtrack album to the film Georgia by Various Artists
- Released: June 18, 1996
- Genre: Folk, country, alternative rock
- Length: 45:59
- Label: Discovery Records

The film's soundtrack was released on June 18, 1996.

No.	Title	Length
1.	"Hard Times Come Again No More" (Mare Winningham)	4:10
2.	"Ain't Nobody's Business" (Jimmy Witherspoon)	2:23
3.	"There She Goes Again" (John Doe)	3:16
4.	"Almost Blue" (Jennifer Jason Leigh)	2:51
5.	"Sally Can't Dance" (John Doe and Jennifer Jason Leigh)	1:28
6.	"Optimistic Voices" (John Doe and Jennifer Jason Leigh)	0:54
7.	"Yosel Yosel" (Jennifer Jason Leigh)	1:41
8.	"I'll Be Your Mirror" (John Doe and Smokey Hormel)	2:47
9.	"Arizona Moon" (Ranch Romance)	4:16
10.	"If I Wanted" (Jennifer Jason Leigh)	3:23
11.	"Mercy" (Mare Winningham, Steven Soles and Ken Stringfellow)
12.	"Take Me Back" (Jennifer Jason Leigh)	9:11
13.	"Midnight Train to Georgia" (Jennifer Jason Leigh)	3:02
14.	"Hard Times" (Jennifer Jason Leigh)	2:54
Total length:		45:59

== Reception ==
=== Release ===
Georgia premiered in the Un Certain Regard section at the 1995 Cannes Film Festival. Georgia was released in the U.S. on December 8, 1995 and grossed $1,110,104.

=== Home media ===
The film was released on VHS on July 23, 1996 by Buena Vista Home Entertainment (under the Miramax Home Entertainment banner). The film also received a US LaserDisc release on July 31, 1996. On February 15, 2000, the film was released on DVD by Miramax Home Entertainment, under their "Miramax Classics" line.

In December 2010, Miramax was sold by The Walt Disney Company, their owners since 1993. That same month, the studio was taken over by private equity firm Filmyard Holdings. Filmyard licensed the home media rights for several Miramax titles to Lionsgate, and Lionsgate Home Entertainment reissued the film on DVD on May 17, 2011. In 2011, Filmyard Holdings licensed the Miramax library to streaming site Netflix. This deal included Georgia, and ran for five years, eventually ending on June 1, 2016.

In March 2016, Filmyard Holdings sold Miramax to Qatari company beIN Media Group. Then in April 2020, ViacomCBS (now known as Paramount Skydance) bought a 49% stake in Miramax, which gave them the rights to the Miramax library. Georgia is among the 700 titles they acquired in the deal, and since April 2020, the film has been distributed by Paramount Pictures. On July 19, 2022, Paramount Home Entertainment reissued the film on DVD, with this being one of many Miramax titles that they reissued around this time. Paramount later licensed the film to Australian distributor Imprint, and on April 7, 2023, they released it on Blu-ray in the country.

On March 4, 2021, Georgia was made available on Paramount's then-new streaming service Paramount+, as one of its inaugural launch titles. Paramount also included it on their free streaming service Pluto TV.

=== Critical reception ===
On review aggregate website Rotten Tomatoes, Georgia has an approval rating of 81% based on 26 reviews.

Susan Wloszczyna of USA Today described the film as "a painful though sadly humorous portrait of sisterhood". Janet Maslin of The New York Times wrote, "With an exploratory style in the spirit of John Cassavetes, 'Georgia' turns Sadie inside out without giving a neatly dramatic structure to her story. The result is a film as maddening and unpredictable as the character herself, held together by a fierce, risk-taking performance and flashes of overwhelming honesty. Sadie would be unbearable if she didn't feel so real." In a 3.5/4-star review, Roger Ebert said Georgia "is not a simply plotted movie about descent and recovery, but a complex, deeply knowledgeable story about how alcoholism and mental illness really are family diseases; Sadie's sickness throws everybody off, and their adjustments to it don't make them healthier people." In The Seattle Times, John Hartl wrote, "The thoughtful script by Barbara Turner...makes certain that Georgia is neither a pushover nor a saint, while Sadie's misguided passion and ambition can be genuinely moving."

James Berardinelli of ReelViews praised it as "a tour de force for Leigh... there are times when it's uncomfortable to watch this performance because it's so powerful", adding "Georgia doesn't possess an amazingly original narrative, but what distinguishes this picture is the depth of the characters and the amazing power with which the two leads breathe life into them." Kenneth Turan of the Los Angeles Times wrote that “Leigh’s exceptional performance tears you apart… we’ve never seen anything like it before”, adding that "Georgia is not an easy film, but in the American independent arena, it outperforms everything in sight.” Barbara Shulgasser of the San Francisco Examiner wrote, "What Leigh succeeds at conveying so well is the desperation of a young woman whose passion for art exceeds her capacity to express herself artistically...Because of [her] powerful performance we glean that 'Georgia' is really not about drug abuse or sibling rivalry, or the frustration of the untalented...but about talent [itself]."

In a 2018 essay for Sight & Sound, Brad Stevens wrote of the film: "What makes this film so endlessly fascinating is its refusal to impose a definitive reading. Is Sadie a talentless amateur leeching off her sister’s talent? Or is she the voice of raw authenticity, her harsh vocal delivery a critique of Georgia’s soulless professionalism? [Ulu] Grosbard does not say, leaving us to fall back on our own judgement."

In 2020, USA Today named Georgia in the number 17 spot on its list of the 24 best films for country music fans.

== Awards and nominations ==
Jennifer Jason Leigh was voted the year's Best Actress by the New York Film Critics Circle and at the Montreal World Film Festival, nominated for an Independent Spirit Award, and was widely predicted to receive her first Oscar nomination for the role. However, it was Mare Winningham who received an Oscar nomination (as well as an Independent Spirit Award and Screen Actors Guild nomination) as Best Supporting Actress, while Leigh was overlooked by the Academy of Motion Picture Arts and Sciences. Speaking to MetroActive magazine, Winningham said: “I felt incredibly honored and touched to be nominated...But it was hard to be separated from Jennifer, because she was the heart and soul of that film. While we were making the movie, I thought not only that she would get a nomination, but that she would win. I saw the kind of work she was doing. In my mind she will always be the greatest performance of that year, and a lot of other people thought so, too. Meryl Streep grabbed me at the Academy Awards. She said, 'Jennifer should be here!' and I said, 'I know!'”

=== List of awards ===
- Academy Awards: Mare Winningham, Best Actress in a Supporting Role (nomination)
- New York Film Critics Circle: Jennifer Jason Leigh, Best Actress (won)
- Montreal World Film Festival: Grand Prix of the Americas for Best Picture (won)
- Montreal World Film Festival: Jennifer Jason Leigh, Best Actress (won)
- Screen Actors Guild: Mare Winningham, Best Supporting Actress (nomination)
- Independent Spirit Awards: Ulu Grosbard, Best Director (nomination)
- Independent Spirit Awards: Mare Winningham, Best Supporting Female (won)
- Independent Spirit Awards: Jennifer Jason Leigh, Best Female Lead (nomination)
- Independent Spirit Awards: Max Perlich, Best Supporting Male (nomination)
