= Tina Huang =

American stage and television actress of Taiwanese descent

- Born: October 28, 1981 (age 44); Dallas, Texas, United States
- Education: Tisch School of the Arts
- Occupations: Stage and television actress
- Years active: 2007–present
- Spouse: Mickey Pentecost (m. 2005)
- Website: www.tinahuang.com

Tina Huang (born October 28, 1981) is an American stage and television actress of Taiwanese descent known for her recurring roles in Rizzoli & Isles and for her semi-regular role as Melinda Trask on the NBC soap Days of Our Lives.

== Life and career ==
=== Early life ===
Huang's parents immigrated to New York City where her two older brothers were born. Then the family moved to Dallas, Texas, where she was born and lived with her mother, brothers and grandfather. Her father went back to New York because he couldn't find work in Dallas at the time. When she turned five, the family moved back to New York. For her, it was a cultural shock moving from the countryside to NYC, and she "felt like I was really intellectually challenged. How lucky was I that I got to go to the Guggenheim or the Metropolitan Museum of Art whenever I wanted?" Huang was raised in Chinatown and on the Lower East Side in New York City.

Being a first generation Taiwanese-American, she is fluent in Mandarin Chinese, and used her language skills to host an episode of the YouTube travel show Resident in Shanghai, although she hesitated to return to her "motherland" after being born and raised in America: "It dawned on me that in Shanghai, I was a foreigner. Maybe that's part of the fear I had coming to Shanghai, to realize I wasn't Chinese".

=== Education and theatre ===
Huang studied theatre at LaGuardia High School of Performing Arts and graduated from NYU's Tisch School of the Arts, She then completed Meisner technique training at The Baron Brown Studios in Santa Monica, California, where she moved in 2003. Huang's practical experiences include travelling for a 14-day cultural exchange with students at the University of the Witwatersrand in South Africa, studying for a semester in Florence, Italy, and performing in an off-Broadway musical called Kaspar Hauser, which was created and directed by Liz Swados. Her stage credits include the award-winning production of Amy Tan's Immortal Heart that toured in the USA and in France in 2010, and the 2012 production of Fairy Tale Theatre: 18 & Over.

Fairy Tale Theatre: 18 & Over garnered positive reviews. The sketch comedy show was created by J. Michael Feldman, based on a collection of "original fairy tales with morals and lessons for adults, such as 'The Tale of the Bipolar Bear' and the "'Co-dependent Eskimo'". The six members of the cast alternate between two shows with a different set of tales. They use hand puppets, camp costumes and a few colourful props, and the fairy tales are told with a "mix of live actors in animal costumes and puppets". The show was played for the past five years at theatres in the Los Angeles area, and was presented at the Edinburgh Festival Fringe in August 2015.

Huang is a founding member of the Ammunition Theater Company in Los Angeles, and she is its present co-artistic director.

=== Television and film ===
Tina Huang first appeared in the television series The Young and the Restless in 2007, and then after in numerous television series and films, among them General Hospital (2007-2014), Hollywood Heights (53 episodes), Switched at Birth, Law & Order: LA and Days of Our Lives in recurring roles. She also appeared in Brothers & Sisters, Castle, Criminal Minds, House M.D. and The Office, and in the 2011 comedy film Larry Crowne. Huang's further film credits include Maximum Ride and My Dead Boyfriend in 2016.

Her probably best known role was the recurring character Susie Chang, the senior criminalist of the Boston Police Department's crime laboratory and the assistant of Dr. Maura Isles, in the US crime-series Rizzoli & Isles from 2011 to July 2015. Her 2015 film and television projects included the short film Guiltless, the comedy My Dead Boyfriend alongside Heather Graham, and NBC's serial Night Shift. Besides her theatrical career, in 2016 Huang appeared in the American television series Shameless, Powerhouse and I Own You, as well as Catching the Break, Scandal and The Bold and the Beautiful (6 episodes) in 2017.

== Personal life ==
Tina Huang's mother was diagnosed with early onset atypical Parkinson's disease. Searching for advice and information, she got in contact with the National Parkinson's Foundation and the Michael J. Fox Foundation for Parkinson's Research. She also supports the Lower Eastside Girls Club of New York, (LESGC) which provides community-based holistic programs and services for girls and young women. As co-director of the Ammunition Theatre Company, Huang supports the company's "mission to reflect the diverse and evolving identity of America and to engage with the community around us."

Huang married Mickey Pentecost on June 18, 2005.

== Filmography ==
Year	Title	Role	Notes
2007	The Young and the Restless	Prison Guard	TV series (1 episode)
2008	Pig Hunt	Brooks	
2008	The Highs & Lows of Milo Brown		Short film
2008	Chuck	Maureen Mitsubishi	TV series (1 episode)
2009	The Man	Marcy Haggle	
2009	La mission	Dr. Chang (uncredited)	
2009	Numb3rs	Ni-Shu	TV series (1 episode)
2009	Dough Boys	Zena	
2009	Dyspareunia	Woman	Short film
2008–2009	Days of Our Lives	Josie Jordan	TV series (2 episodes)
2009	Tenderloin	Skyler	
2010	House M.D.	Public Defender	TV series (1 episode)
2010	The Office	On-Air Reporter	TV series (2 episodes)
2010	CSI: NY	Reporter	TV series (1 episode)
2010	Criminal Minds	Reporter	TV series (1 episode)
2010	Castle	Photo Tech	TV series (1 episode)
2010	The Whole Truth	Manicurist	TV series (1 episode)
2010	1 vs. 100	Stand In	TV series (unknown episodes)
2011	Brothers & Sisters	ER Doctor	TV series (1 episode)
2011	Drive	Waitress	
2011	Larry Crowne	Team Leader #2	
2011	Revenge of the Nerds	Nerd #3	Short film
2010–2011	Law & Order: LA	Tech Stacey Maris	TV series (3 episodes)
2011–2012	Switched at Birth	Tina Choi	TV series (2 episodes)
2012	90210	Officer #1	TV series (1 episode)
2012	Mermates	Michelle	TV series (1 episode)
2012	Emerald Acres	Ming	TV film
2012	Hollywood Heights	Lily Park	TV series (53 episodes)
2012	Childrens Hospital	Tourist Mom	TV series (1 episode)
2012	SuperFans	Tracy	Short film
2013	Kroll Show	Declutter Specialist	TV series (1 episode)
2013	Camp	Counselor	
2007–2014	General Hospital	Dr. Linda Chu	TV series (10 episodes)
2014	Perfect on Paper	Lisa	TV film
2014	CSI: Crime Scene Investigation	I.A. Detective Karen Park	TV series (1 episode)
2015	Nerd Court	Anti-Riker	TV series (1 episode)
2011–2016	Rizzoli & Isles	Susie Chang	TV series (31 episodes)
2015–2016	The Night Shift	Janet	TV series (2 episodes)
2016	Powerhouse	Susan McMann	TV series (1 episode)
2016	Shameless	Yvonne	TV series (1 episode)
2016	Maximum Ride	Dr. Rosen	
2016	My Dead Boyfriend	Stripper Mimi	
2017	Xin	Elaine	Short film
2017	Scandal	Madeline Stewart	TV series (1 episode)
2017	Catching the Break	Kim Chan	TV series (1 episode)
2017	The Bold and the Beautiful	Dr. Campbell	TV series (6 episodes)
2018	Arrow	Kimberly Hill	TV series (6 episodes)
2018	A Night to Regret	Detective Morita	TV film
2020–present	Days of Our Lives	Melinda Trask	Recurring Role
2020	Grey's Anatomy	Roxanne	Episode:"A Hard Pill to Swallow"
2021	Star Wars: The Bad Batch	ES-02 (voice)	TV series (3 episodes)
2023	NCIS	Captain Boggs	Episode:"Butterfly Effect

== Theatre ==
- 2015: Fairy Tale Theatre: 18 & Over, ACME Theatre/Groundlings Theatre, Los Angeles
- 2014: Iamafest, IAMA Theatre Company, Los Angeles
- Mr. Fujiyama's Electric Beach, Cutting Ball Theater, San Francisco
- Stairway to Heaven, Campo Santo, San Francisco
- 2010: Immortal Heart, Word for Word, San Francisco
- 2010: Oregon Trail Live!, San Francisco
- Kaspar Hauser, American Theatre of Actors, New York City
- A Midsummer Night's Dream, Wildflower Productions, New York City
- Talk to Me like the Rain and let Me listen, NYU Tisch, New York City
- Machinal, The Currican Theatre, New York City
