= Jason Kravits =

American actor (born 1967)

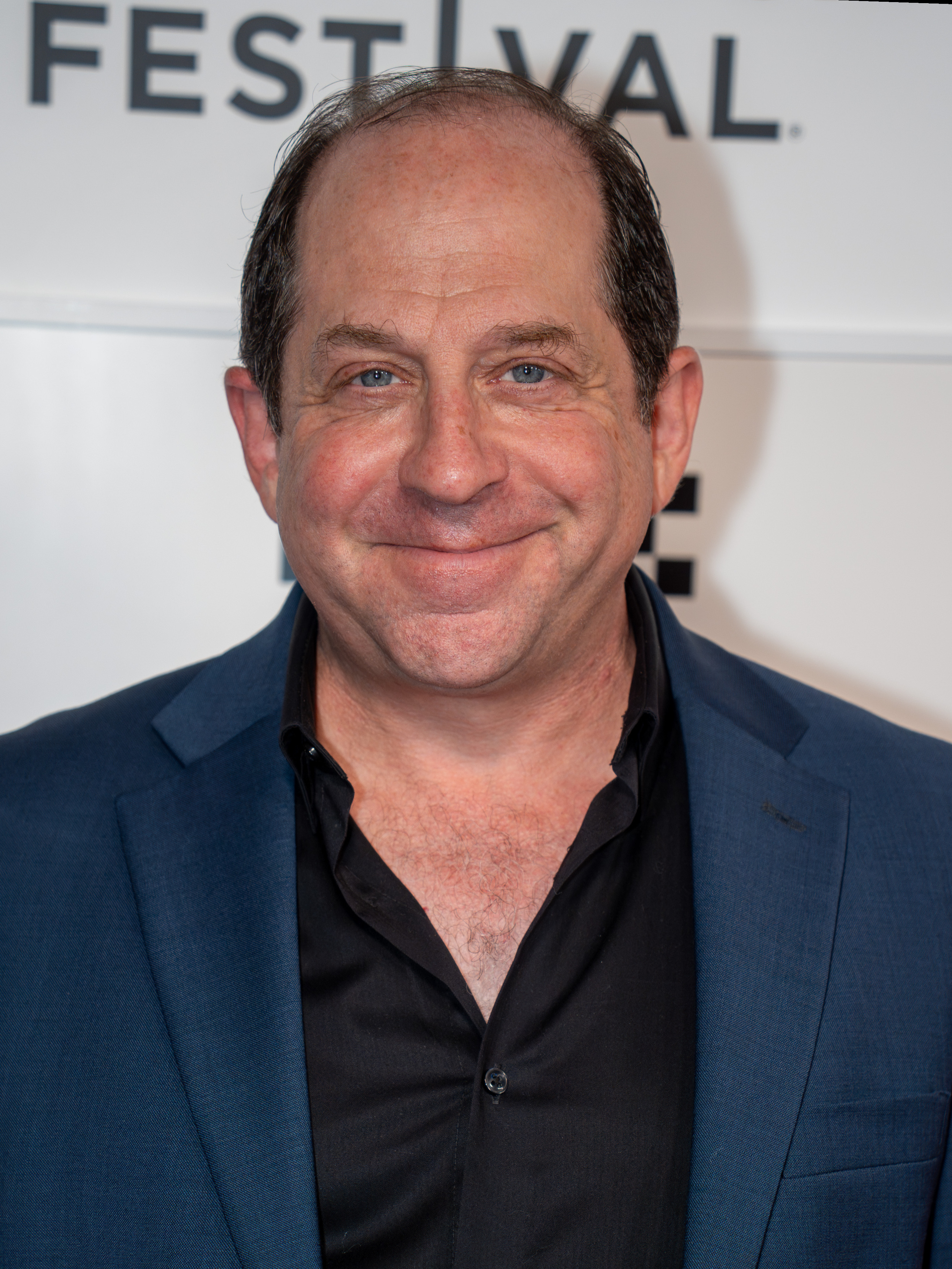
- Kravits at the 2025 Tribeca Festival
- Born: May 28, 1967 (age 59); Passaic, New Jersey, U.S.
- Occupation: Actor
- Years active: 1982–present
- Children: 1

Jason Kravits (born May 28, 1967) is an American character actor. He is best known for portraying A.D.A. Richard Bay on ABC's The Practice.

== Early life and education ==
Kravits was born on May 28, 1967, in Passaic, New Jersey. In 1975, his family moved to Rockville, Maryland where he later attended Colonel Zadok A. Magruder High School. Kravits attended the University of Maryland, College Park, where, in 1986, he co-founded the university's first improv group, Erasable Inc. Kravits is Jewish.

== Career ==
=== Washington, D.C. ===
In 1980, while still in middle school, Kravits landed his first professional acting job, playing Lolo Knopke on the short-lived 1982 PBS series Powerhouse. Upon graduation from University of Maryland, Kravits started working in theater in the Washington, D.C. area, performing regularly at the Washington Jewish Theater and Shakespeare Theater as well as The Round House Theater and Woolly Mammoth Theater companies. He was nominated for two Helen Hayes Awards for his performances in “Free Will and Wonton Lust” by Nicky Silver and “All in the Timing” by David Ives.

While living in the DC area, Kravits also appeared in Major League II and Homicide: Life on the Street.

=== New York City ===
In 1995, Kravits moved to New York City, where he began performing with the writer/performer collective “A Rumble in the Redroom.” Over several years, he, along with fellow performer Joel Hurt Jones developed enough material to create the two-man musical sketch show An Evening with Kravits and Jones. In 1998, after bringing the show to the famous Improv Comedy Club in Los Angeles, the duo was asked to perform at 1999's HBO Comedy Festival in Aspen, Colorado, where they took home the Jury Award for Best Sketch Show.

=== Los Angeles ===
In 1999, Kravits moved to Los Angeles, where he started working regularly in TV and film. Later that year, he guest starred on ABC's The Practice as A.D.A. Richard Bay. Kravits became a recurring character during the show's fourth season and a series regular during its fifth. On the show's 100th episode in 2001, Bay was assassinated after refusing to throw a murder trial.

Kravits continued to work in television and film, landing roles in Gilmore Girls, Everybody Loves Raymond, Curb Your Enthusiasm, and the final episode of Friends. He also appeared regularly as a panelist on several game shows, including NBC's Hollywood Squares and CBS's To Tell the Truth.

=== Return to New York City ===
In 2003, Kravits moved back to New York. That same year, he made his Broadway debut in Larry Gelbart's comedy play Sly Fox. In 2006, he originated the role of “Gangster Number 1” alongside his brother, Garth Kravits, who played "Gangster Number 2" in the Tony-winning musical The Drowsy Chaperone, directed by Casey Nicholaw.

In 2011, Kravits joined the cast of Relatively Speaking, three one-act plays by Ethan Coen, Elaine May, and Woody Allen (directed by John Turturro).

In 2015, Kravits developed the solo, improvised cabaret “Off the Top," featuring entirely improvised songs and music derived from audience suggestions. He has performed the show at the Edinburgh Fringe Festival and Adelaide Cabaret Festival, as well as venues in London, Amsterdam, Melbourne, Washington, D.C., Los Angeles and at the Birdland Theatre in New York. In 2017, the show won a Bistro Award for Best Comedy, and was nominated for a MAC Award in 2021.

Kravits continued to work in television and film, including guest appearances on many Chuck Lorre shows like The Big Bang Theory, Young Sheldon, and B Positive. He provided the voices of Michael Bloomberg, Alan Dershowitz, and others on Our Cartoon President.

Kravits has created several viral parody videos, include a Hamilton-inspired song "Harrison", about William Henry Harrison, and "The Kvetch", an animated parody of Dr. Seuss’s The Grinch. In 2024 he created "The Project 2025" song, an animated short inspired by Schoolhouse Rock! detailing the Heritage Foundation's Project 2025 initiative.

In 2025, Kravits played Vice Principal Douglas Panch in the off-Broadway revival of The 25th Annual Putnam County Spelling Bee at New World Stages.

== Filmography ==
=== Film ===
Year	Title	Role	Notes
1994	Major League II	Accountant	
1999	Blue Streak	Customs guy	
2000	The Flintstones in Viva Rock Vegas	Choreographer	
2000	Dancing at the Blue Iguana	Gordon	
2001	Sweet November	Manny	
2001	Monkeybone	Guest	Uncredited
2002	The Third Wheel	Stage manager	
2002	H.O.L.E.: The Disillusionment of Mike and Eva	Rad Blitzstein	
2004	The Stepford Wives	Vic Stevens	
2005	Wheelmen	Percy	
2006	Waltzing Anna	Dr. Meyer	
2008	What Just Happened	Pollster	
2010	See You in September	Stevie	
2010	Morning Glory	Television executive	
2011	The Adjustment Bureau	New Yorker in courthouse lobby	
2013	Twenty Million People	Twenty Million People	
2013	Chinese Puzzle	L'avocat de Xavier	
2014	Lullaby	Ira	
2016	Bling	Oscar	Voice
2016	My Dead Boyfriend	Medical examiner	
2017	Laura Gets a Cat	Adam	
2018	Accommodations	Warren	
2018	Barking Mad	Irwin Cates	
2021	Either Side of Midnight	Bowles	
2022	Lyle, Lyle, Crocodile	Cy	
2025	Snow White	Sneezy	Voice and facial motion capture

=== Television ===
Year	Title	Role	Notes
1982–1983	Powerhouse	Lolo Knopke	16 episodes
1995	Homicide: Life on the Street	P.R. Lacques	Episode: "Cradle to Grave"
1996	Remember WENN	Mr. Bedlow	Episode: "Some Good News, Some Bad News"
1998	LateLine	Elliot	Episode: "Mona Moves Up"
1999	Jackie's Back	Wimpy Bald Man	Television film
1999–2001	The Practice	A.D.A. Richard Bay	31 episodes
2001	Strong Medicine	Dr. Idinger	Episode: "Bloodwork"
2002	Ed	Barry Gleep	Episode: "Nice Guys Finish Last"
2002	Wolf Lake	Bradley	Episode: "Leader of the Pack"
2002	Gilmore Girls	Dwight	Episode: "Eight O'Clock at the Oasis"
2002	Do Over	Dr. Nachman	3 episodes
2003	Becker	Mr. Whitford	Episode: "Mr. and Ms. Conception"
2003	Wanda at Large	Roger	4 episodes
2003	Charlie Lawrence	Walter Kornbluth	Episode: "New Kid in School"
2004	Yes, Dear	Tim	Episode: "Greg Needs a Friend"
2004	CSI: Crime Scene Investigation	Pierce	Episode: "Bad Words"
2004	Friends	Man in Cab	Episode: "The Last One"
2004	Everybody Loves Raymond	Sam	Episode: "The Mentor"
2004	According to Jim	Dr. Schulman	Episode: "A Vast Difference"
2004, 2020, 2022	Law & Order: Special Victims Unit	Joelle's Attorney / Principal Andrew Kilgore	3 episodes
2007	Law & Order: Criminal Intent	Jim Kettle	Episode: "Smile"
2008	As the World Turns	Dr. Brody	Episode #1.13206
2008	30 Rock	Keith	Episode: "Reunion"
2009	Grey's Anatomy	Chuck Rubin	Episode: "Sympathy for the Devil"
2009	Life on Mars	Jerry	Episode: "Home Is Where You Hang Your Holster"
2009	Sherri	Dr. Flemming	Episode: "Birth"
2009–2010	Royal Pains	Dr. Dan Irving	3 episodes
2010	Law & Order	Attorney Baron	Episode: "Blackmail"
2010	Gravity	Credit card asshole	3 episodes
2010	Edgar Floats	Leonard Chaskes	Television film
2010–2011	Are We There Yet?	Travel Agent / Banker / loan guy	2 episodes
2011	Curb Your Enthusiasm	Ron Solotaroff	Episode: "Palestinian Chicken"
2012	The Good Wife	Nestor	Episode: "Pants on Fire"
2012	Harry's Law	ADA Odom	2 episodes
2013	Blue Bloods	Dave Greenwald	Episode: "Inside Jobs"
2013	Dallas	Pamela's Lawyer	2 episodes
2013	Smash	Timothy	3 episodes
2013	Raising Hope	Rabbi Zwerin	Episode: "Burt Mitzvah: The Musical"
2013	Sullivan & Son	James Franklin	Episode: "Over the Edge"
2013	Masters of Sex	Doctor	Episode: "Manhigh"
2013–2014	The Michael J. Fox Show	Doug	7 episodes
2014	Hot in Cleveland	Dr. Ira Klein	Episode: "Dr. Who?"
2014	Deadbeat	Buddy Silvers	Episode: "The Comedium"
2014	Married	Weberman	Episode: "Uncool"
2014	The Blacklist	Dr. Gordon Albee	Episode: "Dr. James Covington (No. 89)"
2015	Blindspot	Doctor	Episode: "Eight Slim Grins"
2015	Madam Secretary	Senator Parisi	2 episodes
2015–2016	Unbreakable Kimmy Schmidt	Gary Dubbin	4 episodes
2016	Madoff	Frank Avellino	4 episodes
2016	Major Crimes	D.D.A Barry Rosen	2 episodes
2017	Disjointed	Franklin Young	Episode: "Omega Strain"
2017	The Mick	Barry	3 episodes
2017	Young Sheldon	Dr. Ronald Hodges	Episode: "A Patch, a Modem, and a Zantac"
2018	Kevin Can Wait	Malcolm	Episode: "Fight or Flight"
2018	Instinct	Theodore Burton	Episode: "Flat Line"
2018	The Deuce	Photographer	Episode: "What Big Ideas"
2018	The Kominsky Method	Woody Littlehales	Episode: "Chapter 2: An Agent Grieves"
2018–2020	Our Cartoon President	Michael Bloomberg / Alan Dershowitz / Security Guard 1	10 episodes
2019	The Big Bang Theory	Danny	Episode: "The Conference Valuation"
2020	Hunters	Rabbi Grossman	3 episodes
2020	The Goldbergs	Dr. Mittleman	Episode: "Pretty in Pink"
2020	Little Voice	Dale	Episode: "Ghost Light"
2020	The Undoing	Dr. Stuart Rosenfeld	2 episodes
2020–2021	B Positive	Dr. Baskin	5 episodes
2021	Search Party	Leonard	Episode: "The Imposter"
2021	Halston	Carl Epstein	2 episodes
2024	Only Murders in the Building	Big Mike	Episode: "Valley of the Dolls"
