= Jessica Prentice =

American chef, author, and founding member of Three Stone Hearth

Jessica Prentice is an American chef, author, and founding member of Three Stone Hearth, a community-supported kitchen in Berkeley, California. She is known for coining the word locavore, which is a movement in which people seek to eat locally grown foods, often defined as those available within a 100-mile radius.

== Biography ==
Prentice starred as Pepper McKenzie on the 1982 children's television show Powerhouse, which aired on PBS and was later rerun by Nickelodeon.

Her interest in food began when she became a vegetarian at the age of 14, although she subsequently started eating meat again. She worked as director of education programs at the Center for Urban Education about Sustainable Agriculture in San Francisco.

In 1996, she completed the professional Chef's Training at the Natural Gourmet Institute in New York City.

== Food activism ==
Prentice has become a prominent activist for local eating. She describes her activism as a pragmatic rather than doctrinaire view, seeing it as an educational exercise in "consciousness raising" rather than a necessary or sufficient solution to problems of modern food production and consumption.

She co-founded the Three Stone Hearth project in Berkeley, California, which seeks to provide homecooked-style food to subscribers too busy to cook for themselves every day; it has spread to Illinois, New York state, and Minnesota and inspired similar projects in Canada.

She is the author of Full Moon Feast: Food and the Hunger for Connection, which combines essays arguing for local eating with recipes for local seasonal recipes matching the 13 lunar months of the year.

== Criticism ==
Food writer John Mariani has claimed that the concept of a locavore diet is nothing new, being similar to the ideas of Stewart Brand, Frances Moore Lappé, and others. A study by Christopher Weber found that eating locally as proposed by Prentice made no difference to greenhouse gas emissions—although that may not be the chief aim of locavores. She has also been criticized by vegans for promoting meat eating.
