= Sexual Healing (film) =

- Directed by: Howard Cushnir
- Story by: Howard Cushnir
- Produced by: Howard Cushnir; Kosta Iannios
- Starring: Helen Hunt; Anthony Edwards; Jason Alexander
- Cinematography: John Newby
- Edited by: Folmer Weisinger
- Music by: Leonard Marcel
- Production company: BigRock Pictures
- Release date: July 18, 1993
- Running time: 40 minutes
- Country: United States
- Language: English

Sexual Healing is a 1993 American short film written and directed by Howard Cushnir for Showtime and starring Helen Hunt, Anthony Edwards and Jason Alexander.

== Plot ==
A lonely, rejected, single teacher (Edwards) and a bored, neglected housewife (Hunt) connect vicariously through a commercial phone sex line.

== Cast ==
- Helen Hunt
- Anthony Edwards
- Jason Alexander
- Mare Winningham
- Maggie Jakobson
- Sharon Schaffer
- Lena Adrianna

== Production ==
The film was shot in Los Angeles.

== Reception ==
Ken Tucker of Entertainment Weekly graded the film a D.
