= Arthur Nersesian =

American novelist, playwright, and poet

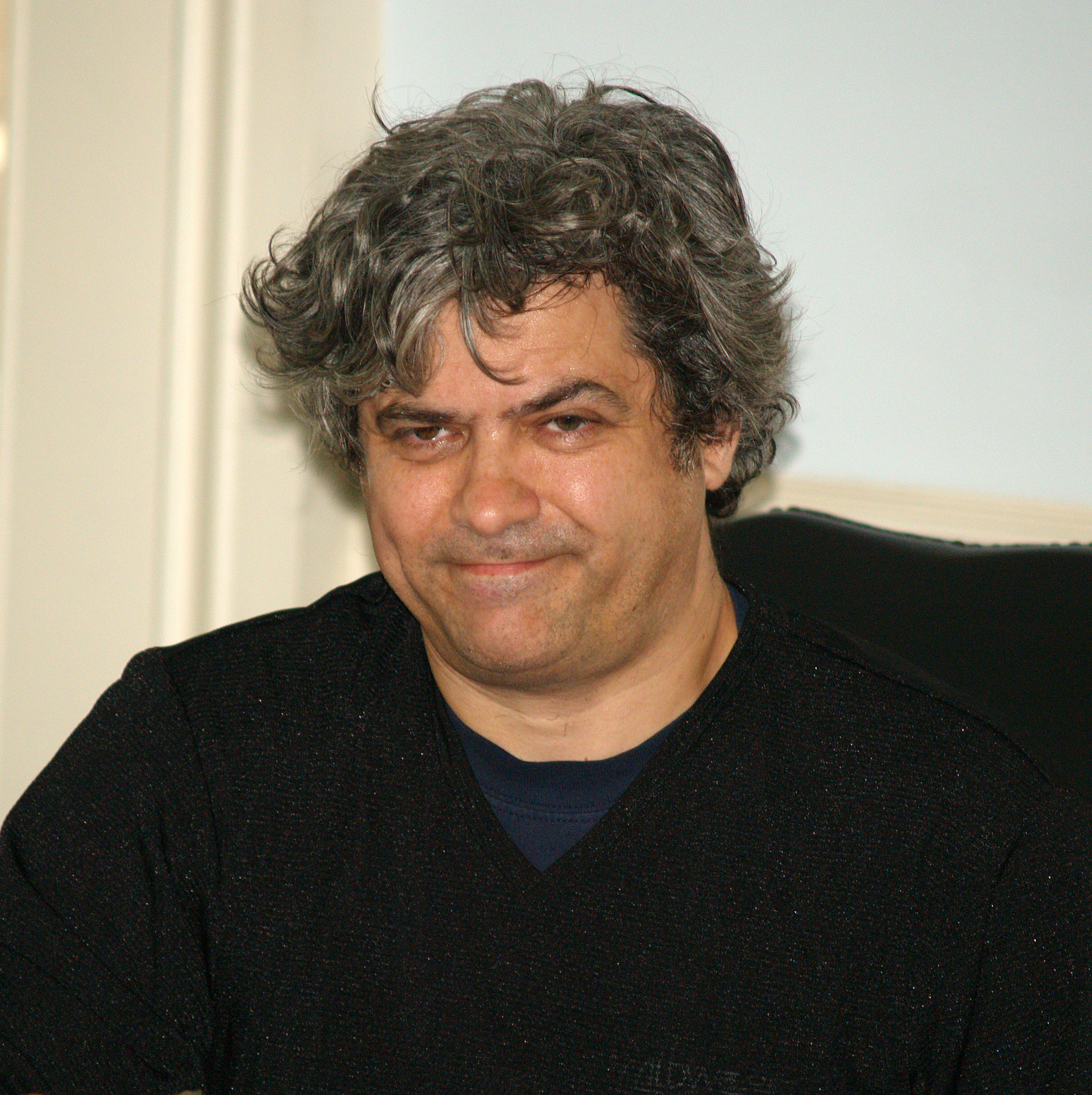
- Nersesian in September 2007
- Born: New York City, U.S.
- Education: Midwood High School
- Occupations: Novelist; playwright; poet

Arthur Nersesian is an American novelist, playwright, and poet.

Nersesian is of Armenian and Irish descent. He was born and raised in New York City, and graduated from Midwood High School in Brooklyn, New York.

His novels include The Fuck-up, Manhattan Loverboy, Dogrun, Chinese Takeout, Suicide Casanova, and Unlubricated. He has also published a collection of plays, East Village Tetralogy. He has written three books of poems and one book of plays. In 2005, Nersesian received the Anahid Literary Prize for Armenian Literature for his novel Unlubricated. Nersesian is the managing editor of the literary magazine, The Portable Lower East Side, and was an English teacher at Hostos Community College, City University of New York, in South Bronx. His novel Dogrun was adapted into the 2016 feature film My Dead Boyfriend. His novel The Five Books of (Robert) Moses is 1,506 pages long, took him more than 25 years to write, and was published on July 28, 2020.

== Bibliography ==
=== Novels ===
- The Fuck-Up (1997) {New York]: MTV / Pocket Books
- Manhattan Loverboy (2000) New York: Akashic Books
- Dogrun (2000) New York: Pocket Books
- Suicide Casanova (2002) New York: Akashic Books
- Chinese Takeout (2003) New York: Perennial
- Unlubricated (2004) New York: Perennial
- The Swing Voter of Staten Island (2007) New York: Akashic Books
- The Sacrificial Circumcision of the Bronx (2008)
- Mesopotamia (2010) New York: Akashic Books
- Gladyss of the Hunt (2014) Portland: Dark Passage
- The Five Books of (Robert) Moses (2020) New York: Akashic Books
- Shit Show (2024) New York: Eponymous Books LLC

=== Plays ===
- East Village Tetralogy (1995) New York: Bookstreet
- Poetry
- New York Complaints [chapbook] (1993, Portable Press)
- Tompkins Square & Other Ill-Fated Riots [chapbook] (1990, Portable Press)
- Tremors and Faultlines: Photopoems of San Francisco (1995, Portable Press)

== Foreign editions ==
Staten Island is the Spanish version of The Swing Voter of Staten Island, published by Alpha Decay in 2010.

== Interviews ==
- Crystal, Garry (Fall 2007). "An Interview with Arthur Nersesian". Tunrow. 5 (1).
- "Globalization of the Worst Kind". 3:AM Magazine. October 8, 2007.
- "Free Williamsburg - Arthur Nersesian". www.freewilliamsburg.com.
