= Anthony Edwards (actor) =

American actor and director (born 1962)

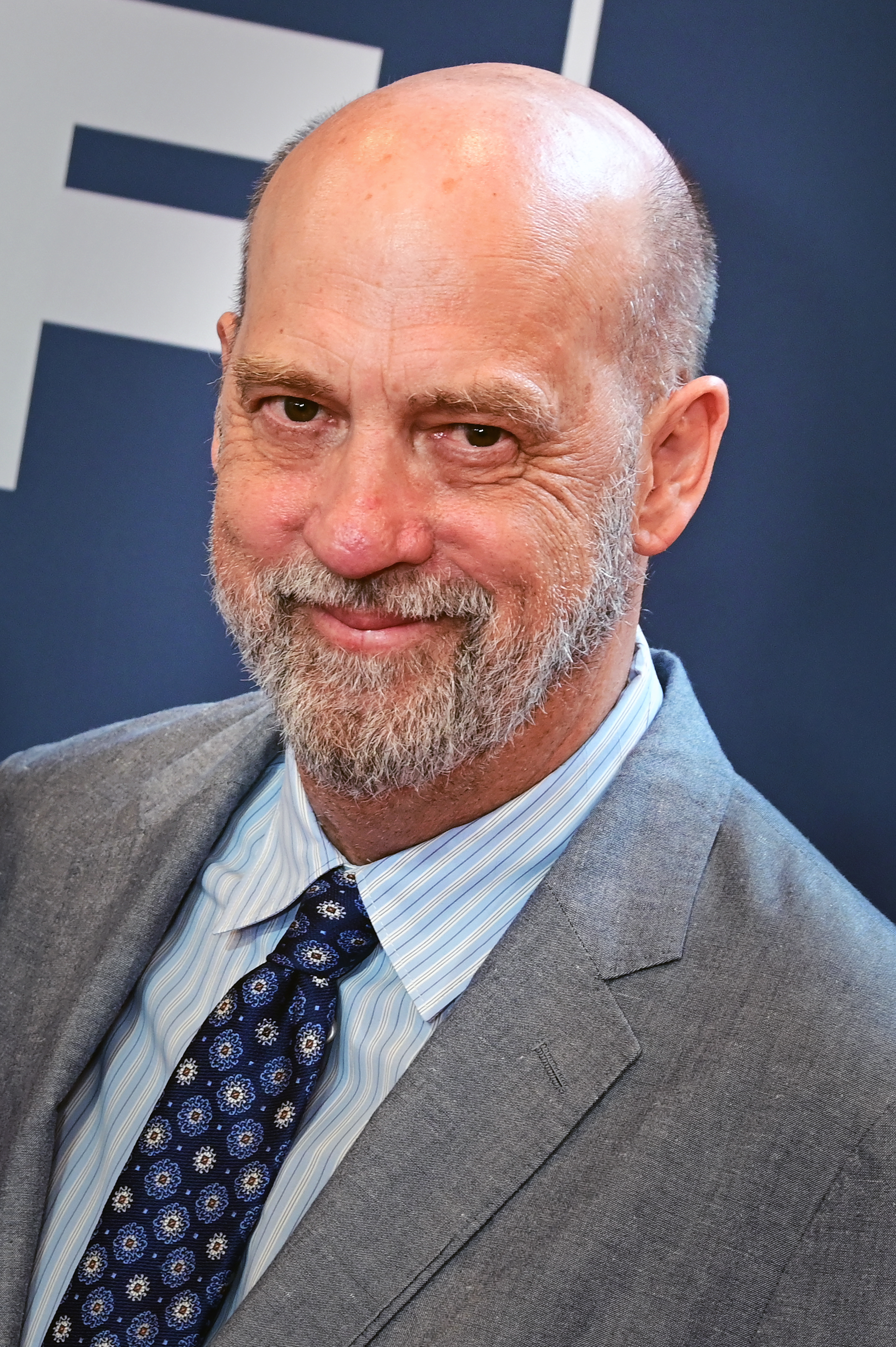
- Edwards in 2026
- Born: Anthony Charles Edwards; July 19, 1962 (age 64); Santa Barbara, California, U.S.
- Occupations: Actor; director; producer
- Years active: 1981–present
- Spouses: Jeanine Lobell (m. 1994; div. 2015) Mare Winningham (m. 2021)
- Children: 4

Anthony Charles Edwards (born July 19, 1962) is an American actor, director, and producer. He played Dr. Mark Greene on the first eight seasons of ER, for which he received a Golden Globe Award and six Screen Actors Guild Awards, and was nominated for four consecutive Primetime Emmy Awards. He has appeared in various films and television series, including Fast Times at Ridgemont High, Top Gun, Zodiac, Gotcha!, Miracle Mile, Revenge of the Nerds, Thunderbirds, Planes, Northern Exposure, and Designated Survivor.

== Early life ==
Edwards was born in Santa Barbara, California, the son of Erika Kem Edwards Plack (née Weber), an artist/landscape painter, and Peter Edwards, an architect to whom he was one of five children. His maternal grandfather was German-born designer Kem Weber. Apart from his maternal German roots, Edwards also has English, Irish, Scottish and Mexican ancestry on his father's side. He received a scholarship to the Royal Academy of Dramatic Arts in England and studied theater at the University of Southern California.

== Career ==
=== Television and film ===
Edward's early film appearances included roles in Fast Times at Ridgemont High (1982), Revenge of the Nerds (1984), Gotcha! (1985) and The Sure Thing (1985). It was Edwards's role as LTJG Nick "Goose" Bradshaw alongside Tom Cruise in the 1986 film Top Gun that brought his first widespread public acknowledgement. His character, who died in an aviation accident, was among the most prominent and popular in the film. Scenes with him and his film family (played by Meg Ryan and Aaron and Adam Weis) were later reprised as flashbacks in the 2022 sequel Top Gun: Maverick.

Edwards's roles following Top Gun included Revenge of the Nerds II: Nerds in Paradise (1987), Miracle Mile (1988), Downtown (1990), Pet Sematary Two (1992) and The Client (1994). He also had a recurring role on the TV series Northern Exposure from 1992 to 1993.

His best-known role is as Dr. Mark Greene on the long-running TV series ER, from the series premiere in 1994 to the end of the eighth season in 2002. The series also afforded Edwards his first opportunity to direct. Edwards's desire to pursue directing led to his request to be written out of the series. He reportedly earned $35 million for three seasons on ER, which made him one of television's highest-paid actors. Edwards received four Primetime Emmy Award nominations for ER. He won a Golden Globe Award For Best Performance by an Actor-In a TV Series after being nominated four times and he has two Screen Actor's Guild Awards. In 2008, Edwards returned to ER to reprise his role as Dr. Greene (in flashback scenes, where he treats the dying son of character Catherine Banfield) for one episode during its 15th and final season. Following ER, he took some time to raise his children, appreciating the privilege that his ER salary provided.

His film appearances following ER included the science fiction film Thunderbirds (2004), the psychological thriller film The Forgotten (2004) and the crime thriller film Zodiac (2007). In 2010, Edwards appeared in the movie Motherhood, which set a record for the biggest bomb in British cinema history by garnering £88 on 11 tickets on opening weekend. Motherhood did not fare much better in the United States, earning $93,388 in three weeks of release. At the time, he said he took the role because "it seemed like a very organic and real thing. It really kind of reminded me of what the dynamic in a family is like." Edwards reunited with Val Kilmer, another actor from Top Gun, when he voiced one of the fighter jets in the Disneytoon Studios film Planes (2013).

In 2018, Edwards was cast in the recurring role in the third season of Netflix's Designated Survivor as Mars Harper, the President's Chief of Staff. In 2020, he served as an executive producer of the film adaptation of Martin Moran's The Tricky Part. In 2022, Edwards was cast as Alan Reed in Netflix's docu-series Inventing Anna.

=== Honors and awards ===
Edwards received four Emmy nominations for Outstanding Lead Actor in a Drama Series for ER and won as an executive producer on Outstanding Television Movie winner Temple Grandin. He earned a People's Choice Award for Favorite Male Performer in a New Television Series for ER (1995); and won six Screen Actors Guild Awards for: Outstanding Performance by a Male Actor in a Drama Series (1996 and 1998), and Best Ensemble Cast (1996, 1997, 1998 and 1999), all for ER. He won the Golden Globe Award for Best Performance by an Actor in a Television Drama in 1998) for ER.

Edwards also won a Daytime Emmy for the production of the underground rock documentary N.Y.H.C. (1999) and the telepic adaptation of Kimberly Willis Holt's 1998 coming of age novel My Louisiana Sky (2001), and earned the Carnegie Medal Award for My Louisiana Sky (2003).

=== Theater ===
After a long career in television, Edwards made his Broadway debut as his second act in 2018 in the revival of Children of a Lesser God at Studio 54. In 2015 he appeared in Classic Stage Company's A Month in the Country but his stage acting career began when he was growing up in Santa Barbara.

On May 13, 2022, Edwards made his unexpected Broadway musical debut when he appeared as Dr. Walker in the Broadway production of Girl from the North Country due to COVID-19 cases impacting the cast. The show also stars his wife, Mare Winningham.

Edwards appeared in the 2024 Broadway production of Prayer for the French Republic by Joshua Harmon.

== Personal life ==
Edwards was married to Jeanine Lobell from 1994 to 2015. They have one son and three daughters. At the end of 2021, Edwards and longtime friend and fellow actor Mare Winningham eloped.

On November 10, 2017, Edwards wrote an essay on Medium, in which he stated that producer and screenwriter Gary Goddard had befriended and for years sexually assaulted him and his friends, beginning when they were 12 years old.

Edwards has been a licensed private pilot since 2012.

== Filmography ==
=== Film ===
Year	Title	Role	Notes
1982	Fast Times at Ridgemont High	Stoner Bud	
1983	Heart Like a Wheel	John Muldowney (age 15–23)	
1984	Revenge of the Nerds	Gilbert Lowe	
1985	Gotcha!	Jonathan Moore	
1985	The Sure Thing	Lance	
1986	Top Gun	Lt. Jr. Grd. Nick "Goose" Bradshaw	
1987	Summer Heat	Aaron	
1987	Revenge of the Nerds II: Nerds in Paradise	Gilbert Lowe	
1988	Hawks	Deckermensky, 'Decker'	
1988	Miracle Mile	Harry Washello	
1988	Mr. North	Theophilus North	
1989	How I Got into College	Kip Hammett	
1990	Downtown	Alex Kearney	
1992	Pet Sematary Two	Chase Matthews	
1992	Delta Heat	Mike Bishop	
1993	Sexual Healing	David	Short; Nominated — CableACE Award for Actor in a Movie or Miniseries
1994	The Client	Clint Von Hooser	
1994	Charlie's Ghost Story	Dave	Also director
1998	Playing by Heart	Roger	
1998	Good Night, Gorilla	Zookeeper (voice)	Short
1999	Don't Go Breaking My Heart	Tony Dorfman	
2001	Jackpot	Tracy	
2003	Northfork	Happy	
2004	Thunderbirds	Ray "Brains" Hackenbacker	
2004	The Forgotten	Jim Paretta	
2007	Zodiac	Inspector William Armstrong	
2009	Motherhood	Avery Welsh	
2010	Flipped	Steven Loski	
2012	Big Sur	Lawrence Ferlinghetti	
2013	Planes	Echo (voice)	
2015	Experimenter	Miller	
2015	Consumed	Lab Scientist	
2016	My Dead Boyfriend	—N/a	Director
2022	Top Gun: Maverick	Lt. Jr. Grd. Nick "Goose" Bradshaw	(Archive footage for flashback scenes)

=== Television ===
Key
†	Denotes television productions that have not yet been released

Year	Title	Role	Notes
1981	The Killing of Randy Webster	Tommy Lee Swanson	Television film
1981	Walking Tall	Robbie	Episode: "The Fire Within"
1982–1983	It Takes Two	Andy Quinn	Main role
1983	High School U.S.A.	Beau Middleton	Television film
1984	Call to Glory	Billy	1 episode
1985	Going for the Gold: The Bill Johnson Story	Bill Johnson	Television film
1990	El Diablo	Billy Ray Smith	Television film
1990	Hometown Boy Makes Good	Boyd Geary	Television film
1992–1993	Northern Exposure	Mike Monroe	Recurring role
1994–2002, 2008	ER	Dr. Mark Greene	Main role, also directed 4 episodes Golden Globe Award for Best Actor – Television Series Drama (1998); Screen Actors Guild Award for Outstanding Performance by a Male Actor in a Drama Series (1996, 1998); Screen Actors Guild Award for Outstanding Performance by an Ensemble in a Drama Series (1996–1997–1998–1999); TV Land Award - Icon Award (2009); Nominated — Golden Globe Award for Best Actor – Television Series Drama (1996–1997, 1999); Nominated — Primetime Emmy Award for Outstanding Lead Actor – Drama Series (1995–98); Nominated — Satellite Award for Best Actor – Television Series Drama (1997); Nominated — Screen Actors Guild Award for Outstanding Performance by a Male Actor in a Drama Series (1997, 1999, 2001); Nominated — Screen Actors Guild Award for Outstanding Performance by an Ensemble in a Drama Series (1995, 2000–01); Nominated — TV Guide Award for Actor of the Year in a Drama Series (2001)
1995	Saturday Night Live	Host	1 episode
1996	In Cold Blood	Dick Hickock	Miniseries
2001	Cursed	Ricky	1 episode
2001	Frasier	Tom	1 episode
2013	Zero Hour	Hank Galliston	Main role
2015	Girls	Melvin Shapiro	1 episode
2015	Blue Bloods	Owen Cairo	1 episode
2016	Billions	Judge Whit Wilcox	2 episodes
2016	Law & Order: Special Victims Unit	Patrick Griffin	1 episode
2016	Drunk History	Giles Allen	1 episode
2017	Law & Order True Crime	Judge Stanley Weisberg	Recurring role
2019	Designated Survivor	White House Chief of Staff Mars Harper	Recurring role
2022	Inventing Anna	Alan Reed	Miniseries
2022	WeCrashed	Bruce Dunlevie	Miniseries
2022	Tales of the Walking Dead	Dr. Chauncey Everett	1 episode
2026	Law & Order	Judge Kenneth Sullivan	Episode: "Liberty"
TBA	Seven Sisters †	Paul Bosco	Main role

=== Producer ===
Year	Title	Role	Notes
1999	N.Y.H.C.	Executive producer	
2001	My Louisiana Sky	Executive producer	Television film Carnegie Medal for Excellence in Children's Video (2002); Daytime Emmy Award for Outstanding Children's Special (2002)
2003	Die, Mommie, Die!	Producer	
2010	Temple Grandin	Executive producer	Television film Primetime Emmy Award for Outstanding Television Movie (2010)
