= Actor Award for Outstanding Performance by a Male Actor in a Drama Series =

Actor Award for Best Actor in a Drama Series
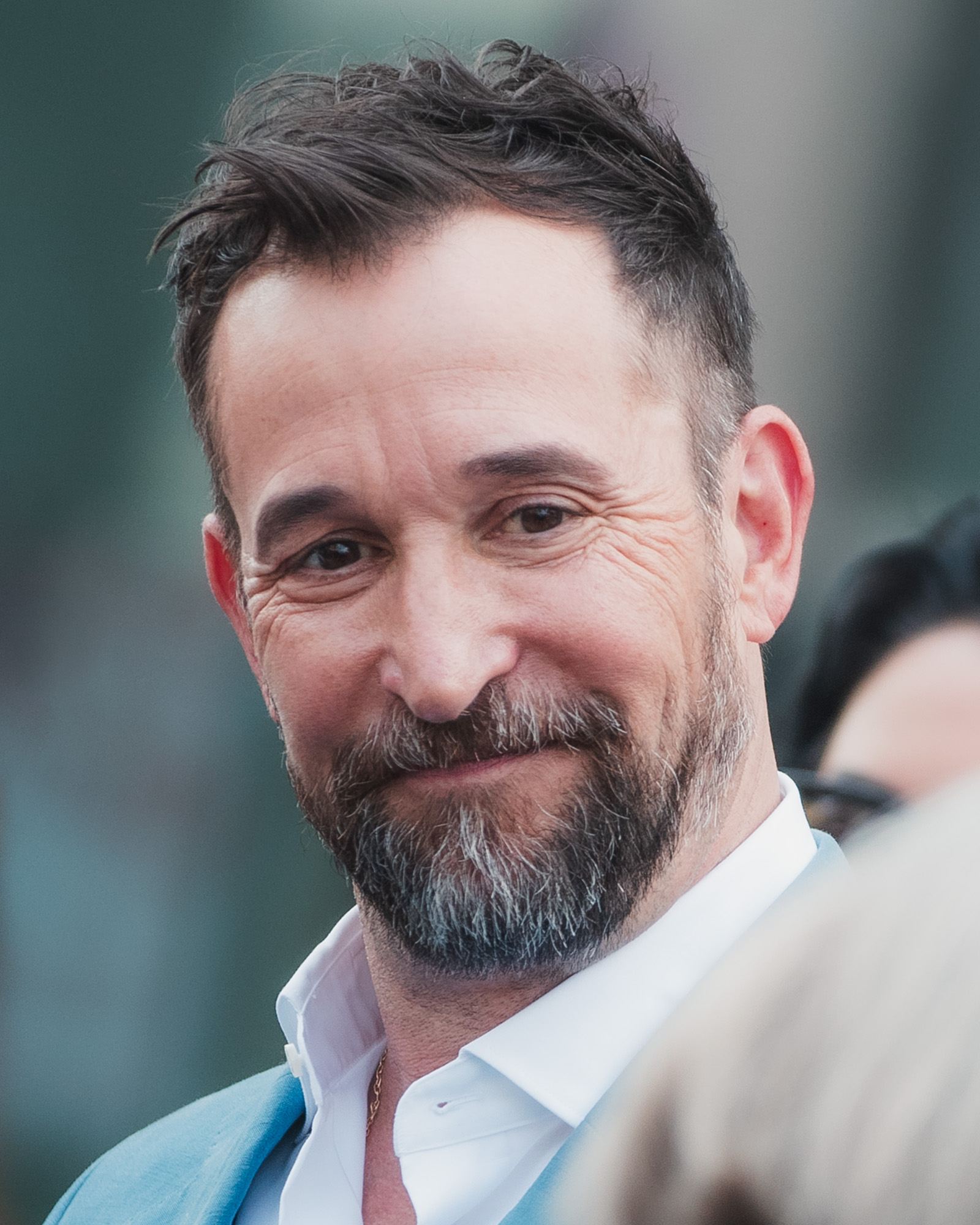
- The 2025 recipient: Noah Wyle
- Awarded for: Outstanding Performance by a Male Actor in a Drama Series
- Location: Los Angeles, California
- Presented by: SAG-AFTRA
- Currently held by: Noah Wyle for The Pitt (2025)
- Website: sagawards.org

The Actor Award for Outstanding Performance by a Male Actor in a Drama Series is an award given by the Screen Actors Guild to honor the finest acting achievements in dramatic television.

Dennis Franz holds the record for most nominations with 8. Actors who have won this award the most times are James Gandolfini playing Tony Soprano in The Sopranos and Jason Bateman playing Marty Bryde in Ozark, each having won thrice. Eight actors have won twice in this category: Steve Buscemi, Bryan Cranston, Anthony Edwards, Dennis Franz, Hugh Laurie, Martin Sheen, Kevin Spacey, and Kiefer Sutherland.

== Winners and nominees ==
indicates the winner.

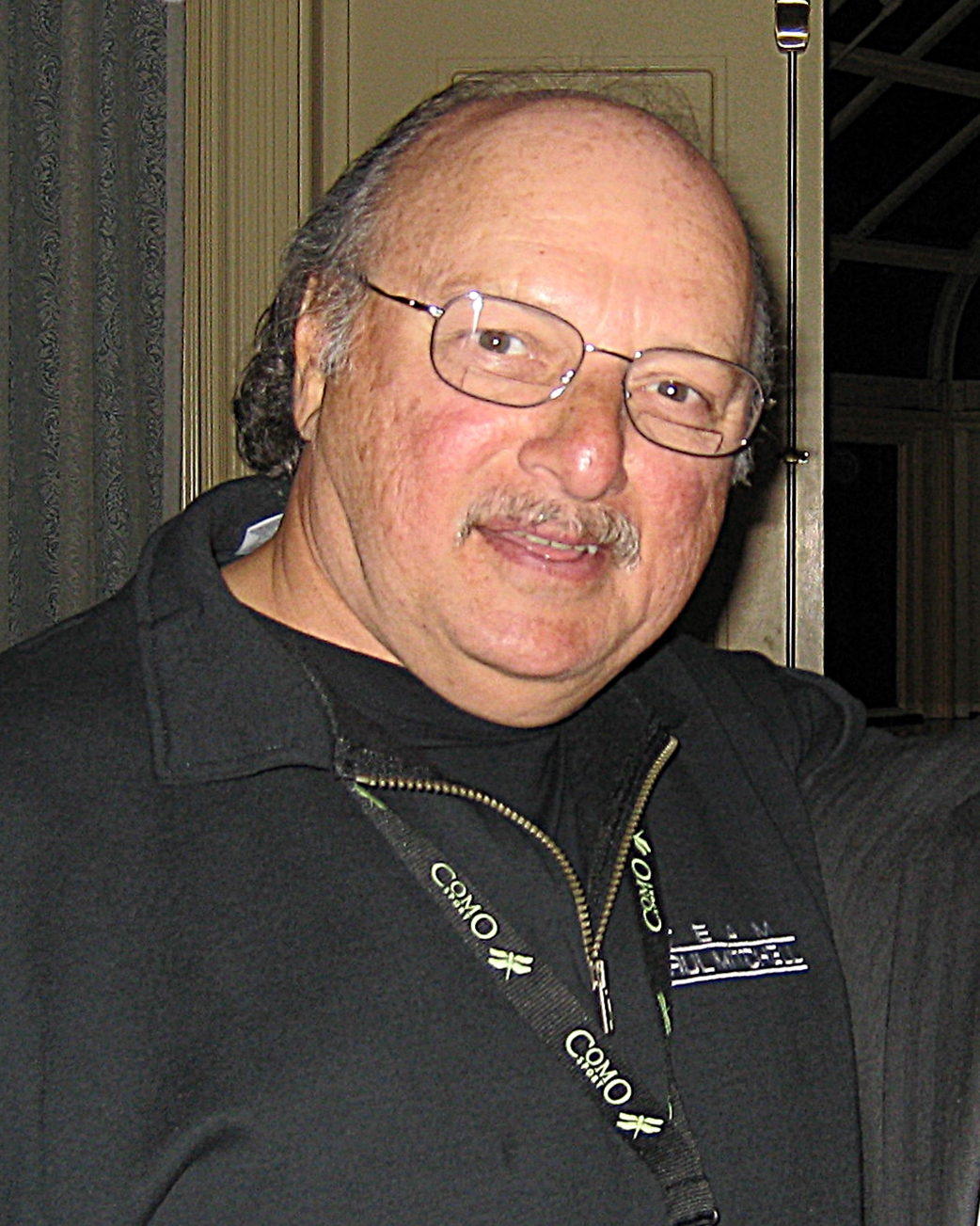
Dennis Franz won twice for NYPD Blue (1994, 1996)

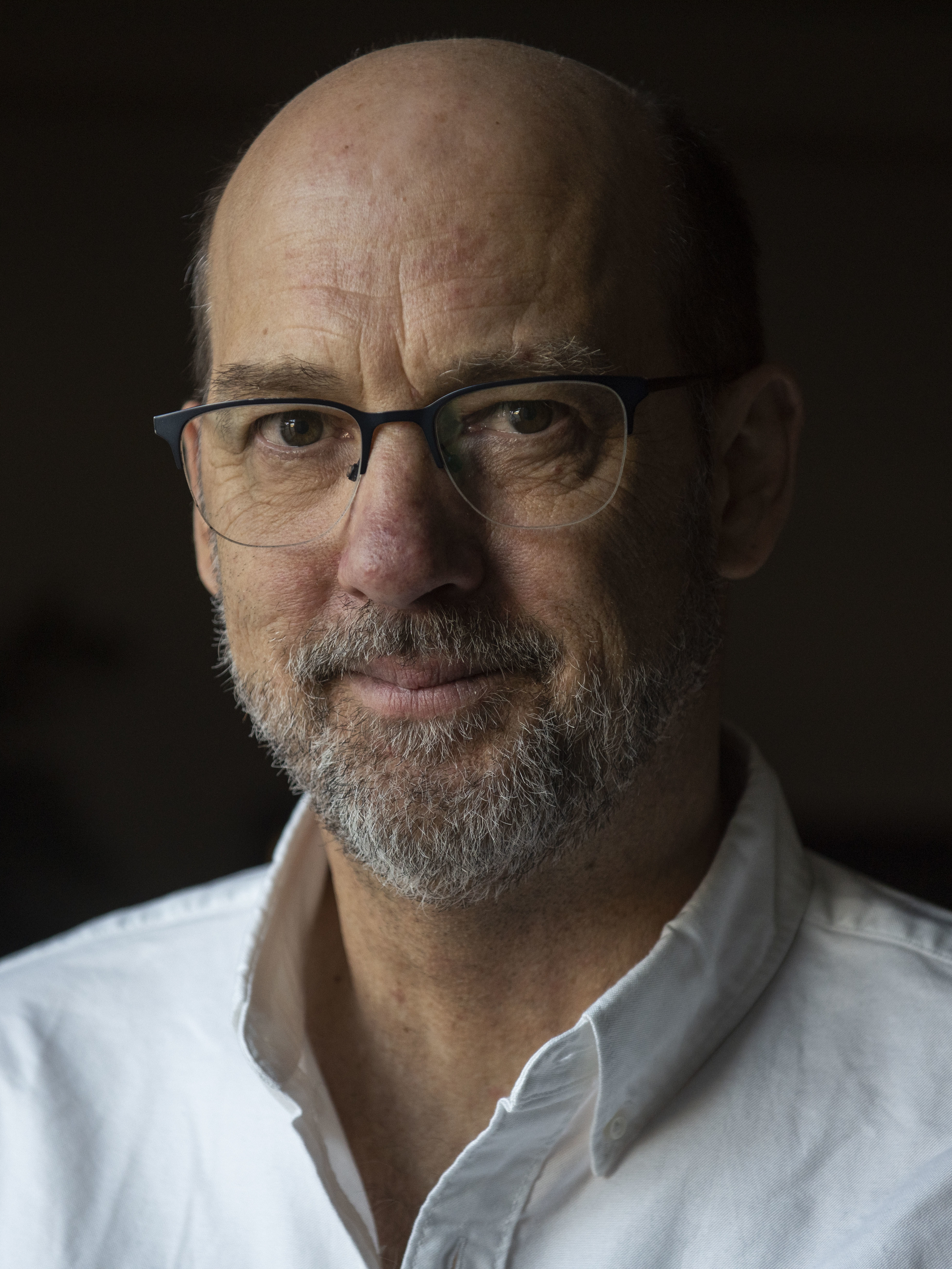
Anthony Edwards won twice for ER (1995, 1997)

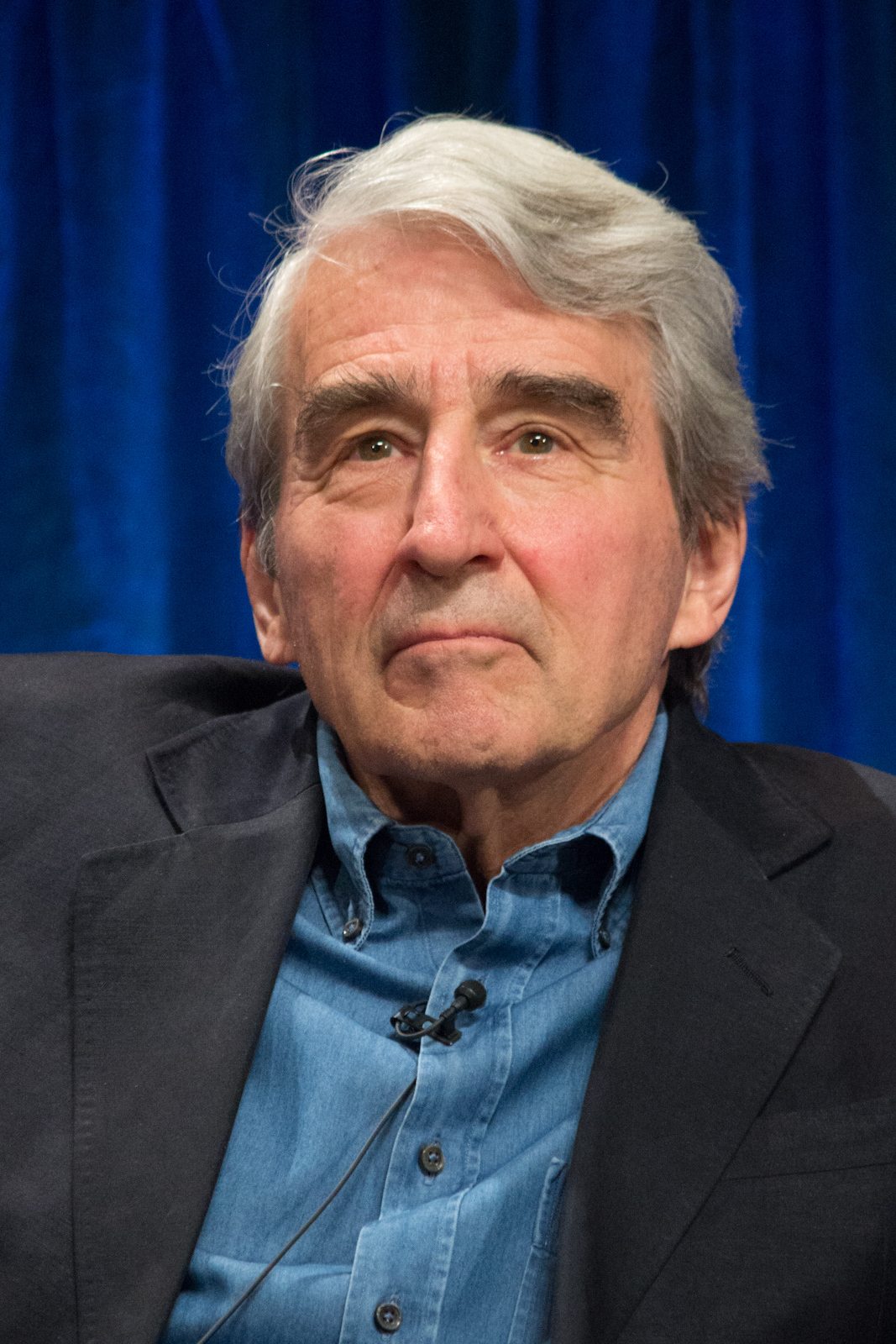
Sam Waterston won for Law & Order (1998)

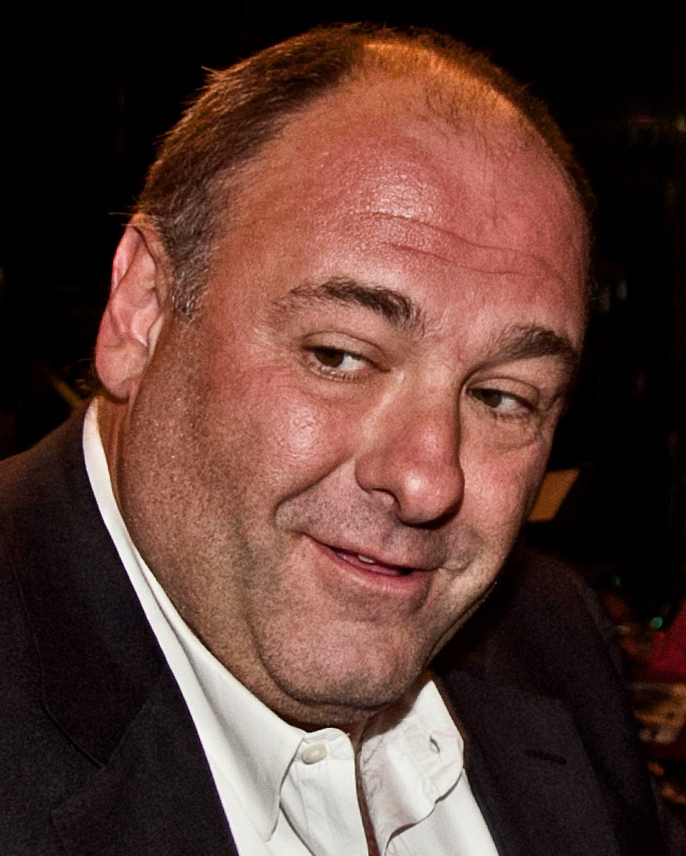
James Gandolfini won thrice for playing Tony Soprano in The Sopranos (1999, 2002, and 2007)

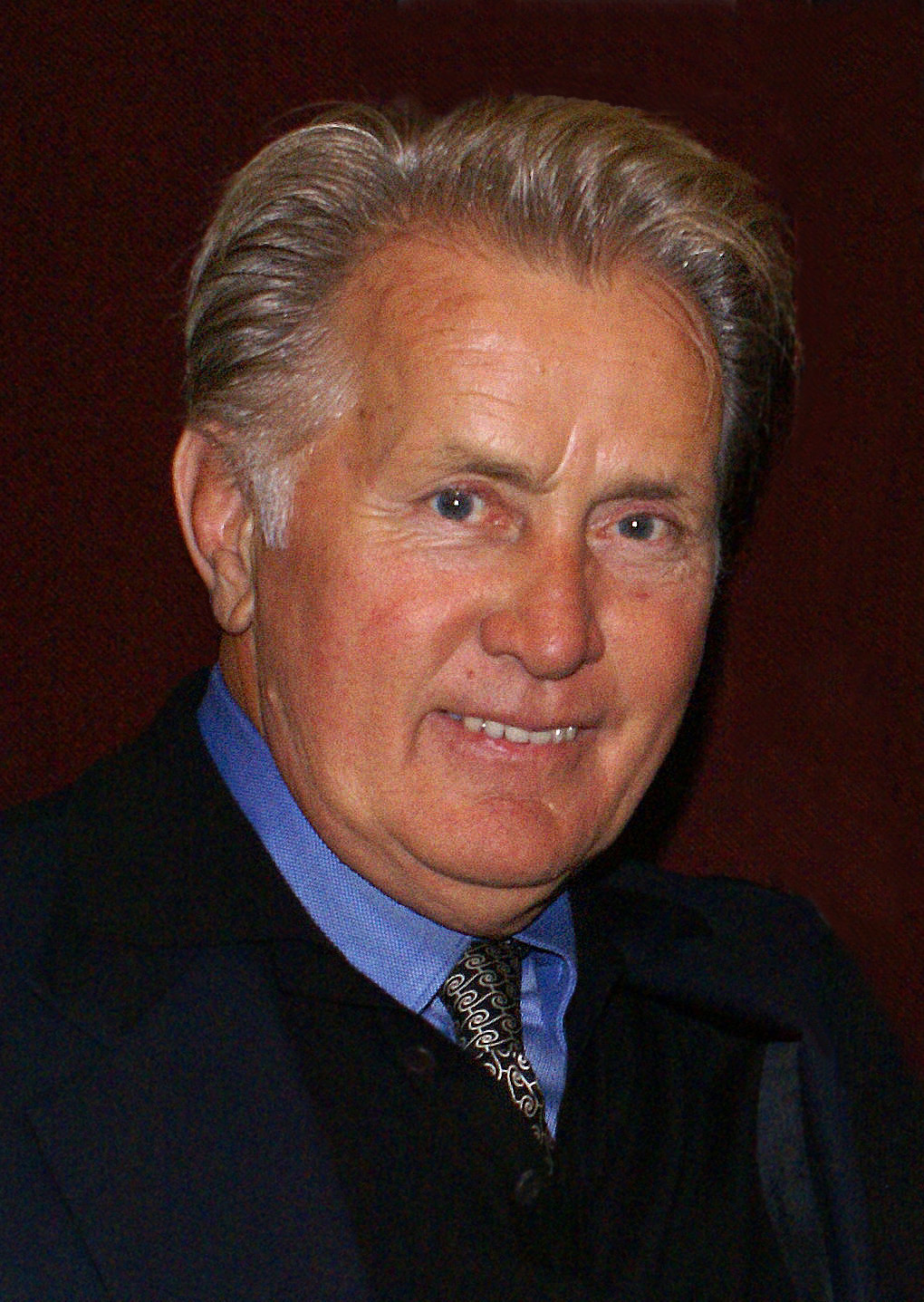
Martin Sheen won two for playing Josiah Bartlett in The West Wing (2000, 2001)

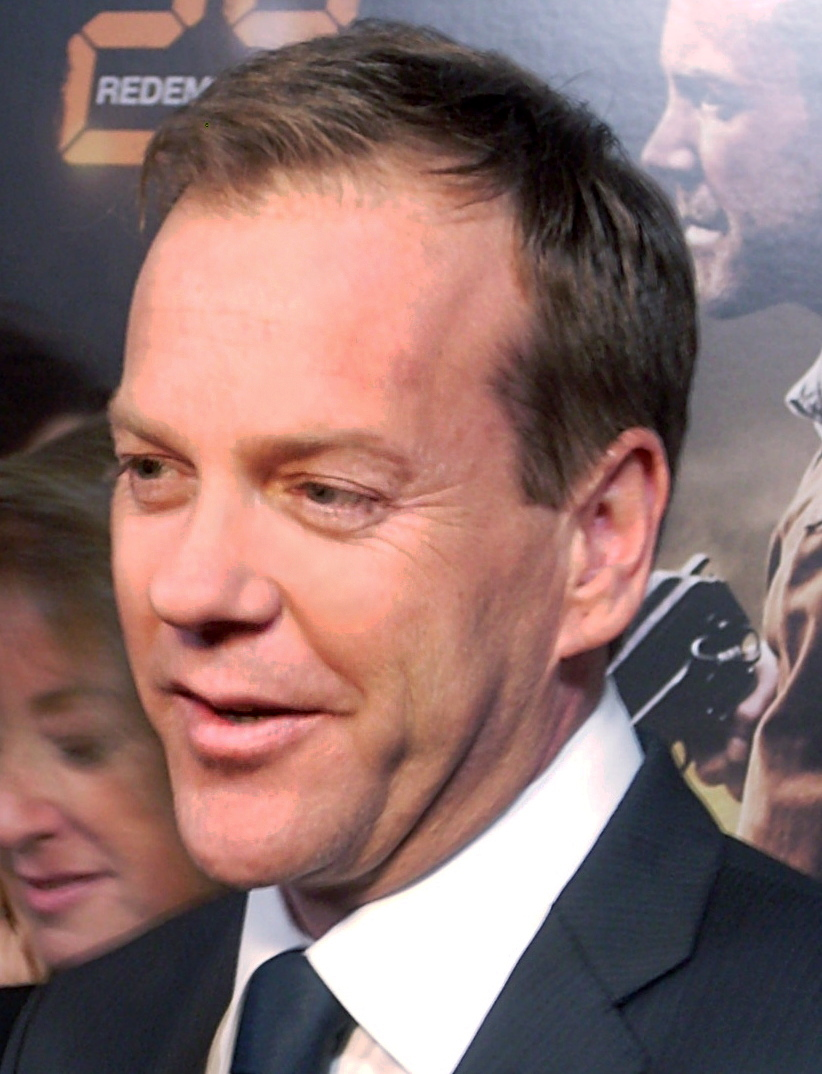
Kiefer Sutherland won for 24 (2003)

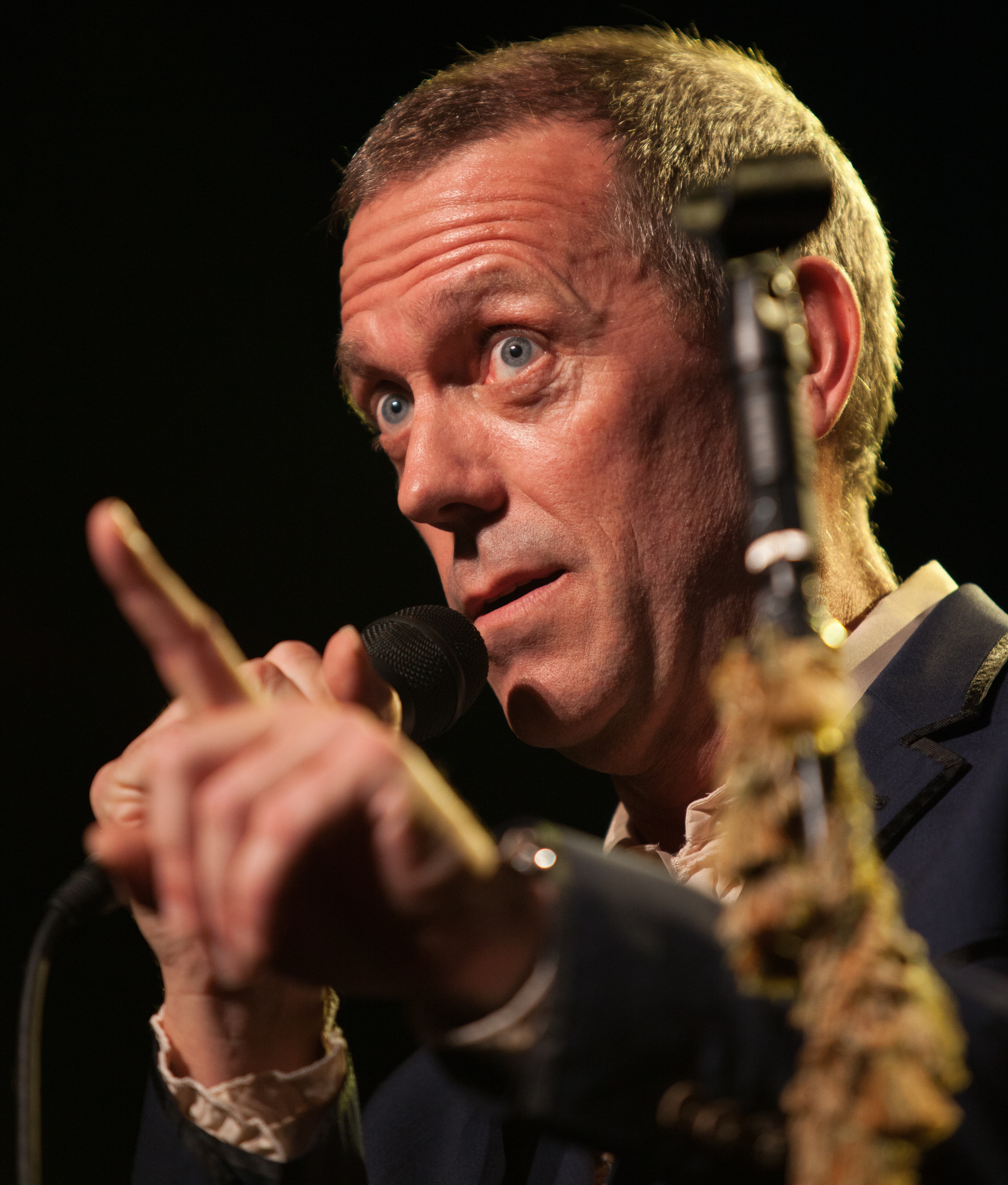
Hugh Laurie won for House (2006)

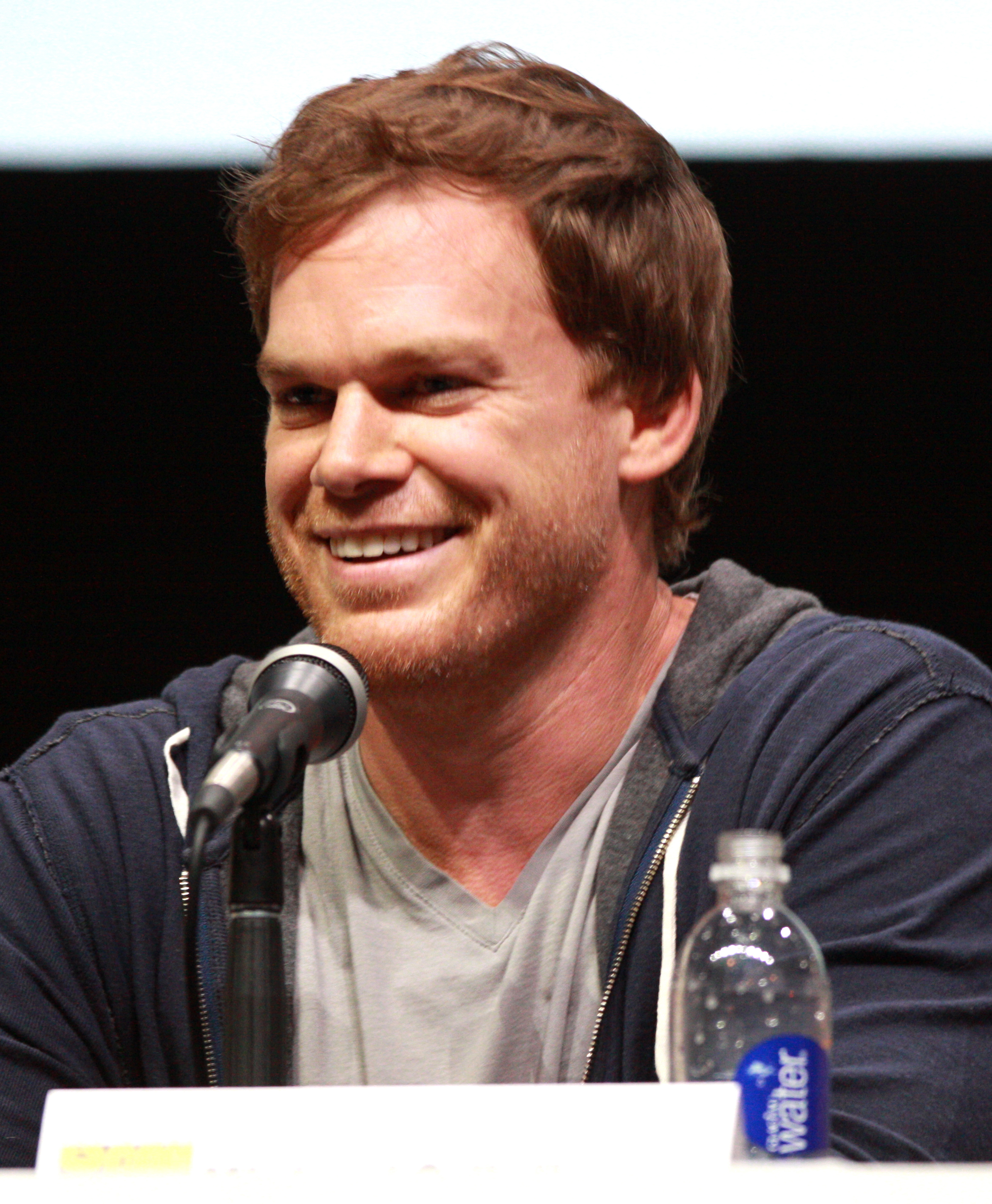
Michael C. Hall for Dexter (2009)

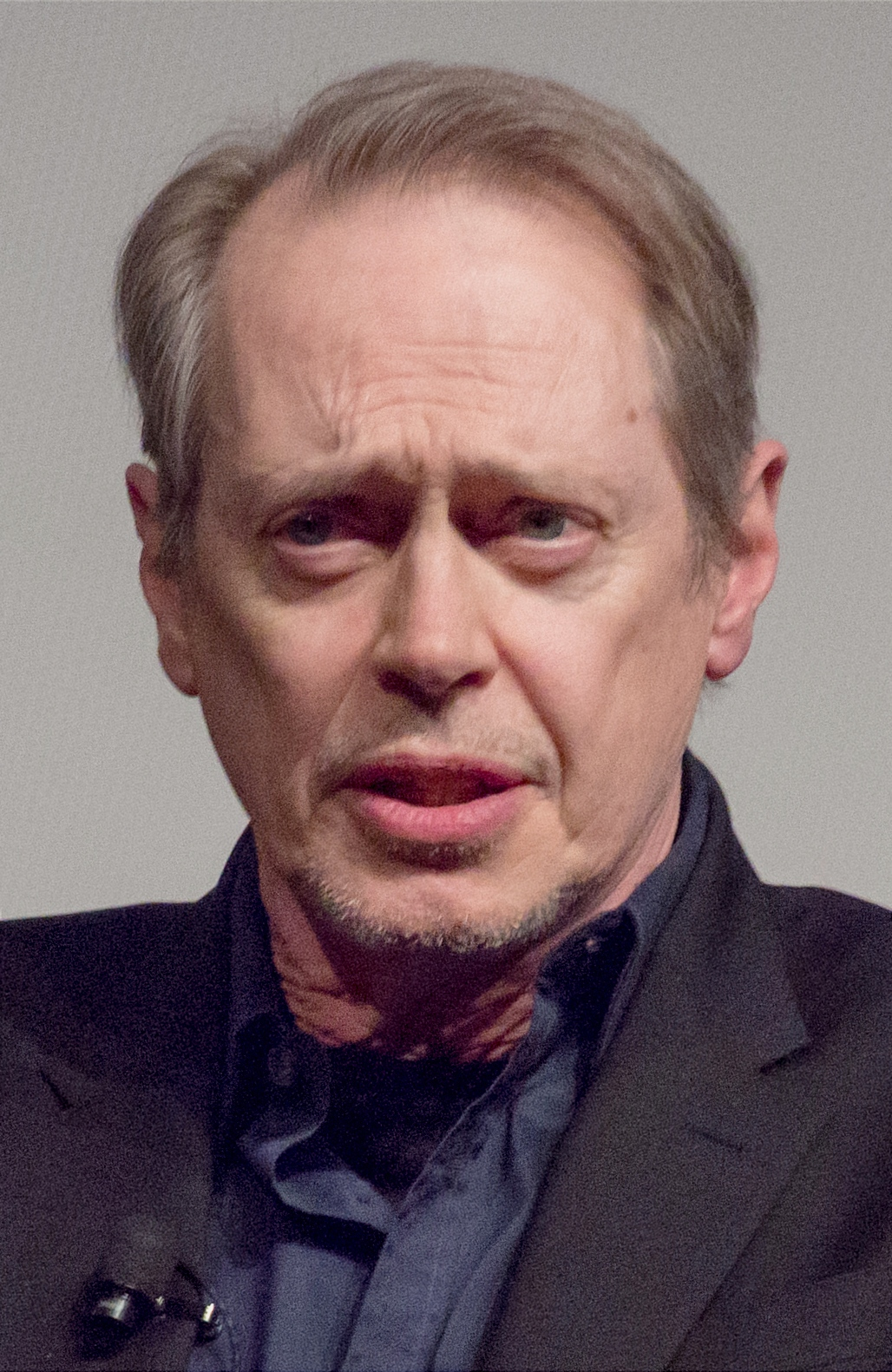
Steve Buscemi won twice for playing Nucky Thompson in Boardwalk Empire (2010, 2011)

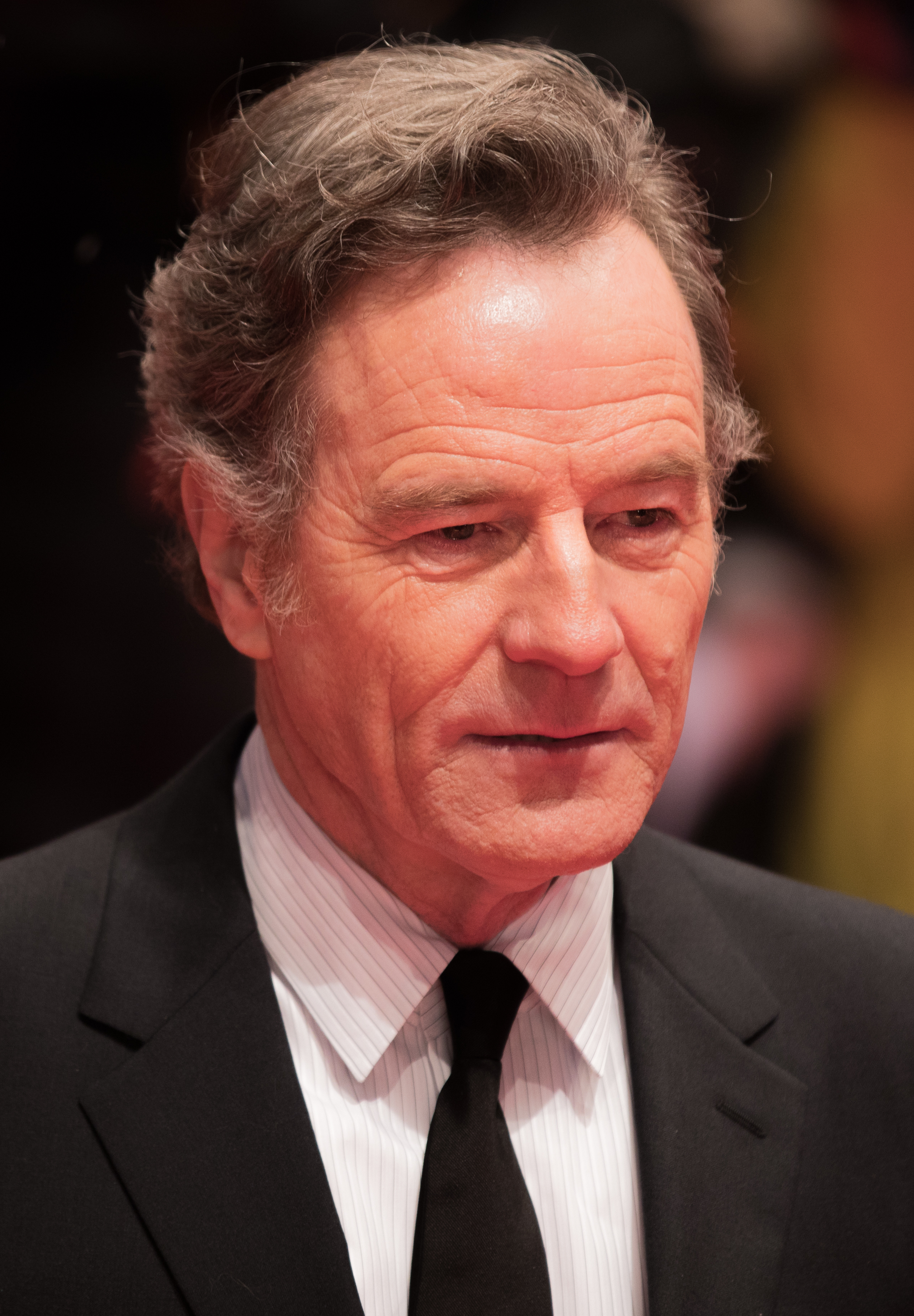
Bryan Cranston won twice for playing Walter White in Breaking Bad (2012, 2013)

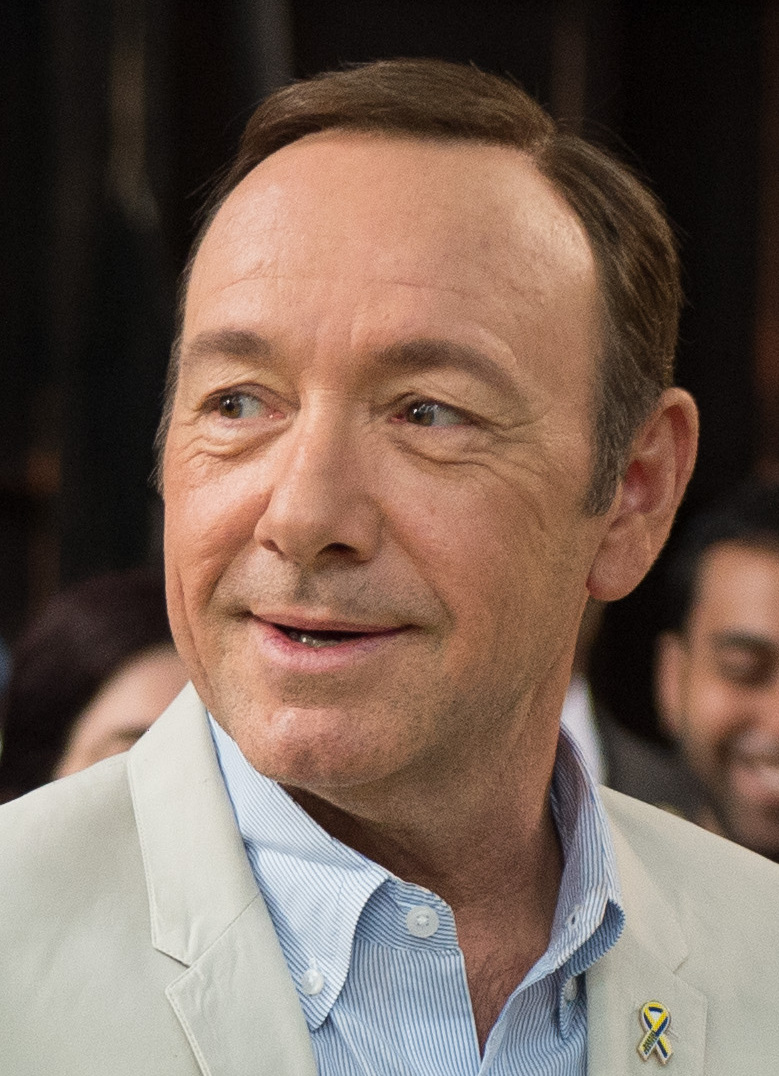
Kevin Spacey won twice for playing Francis Underwood in House of Cards (2014, 2015)

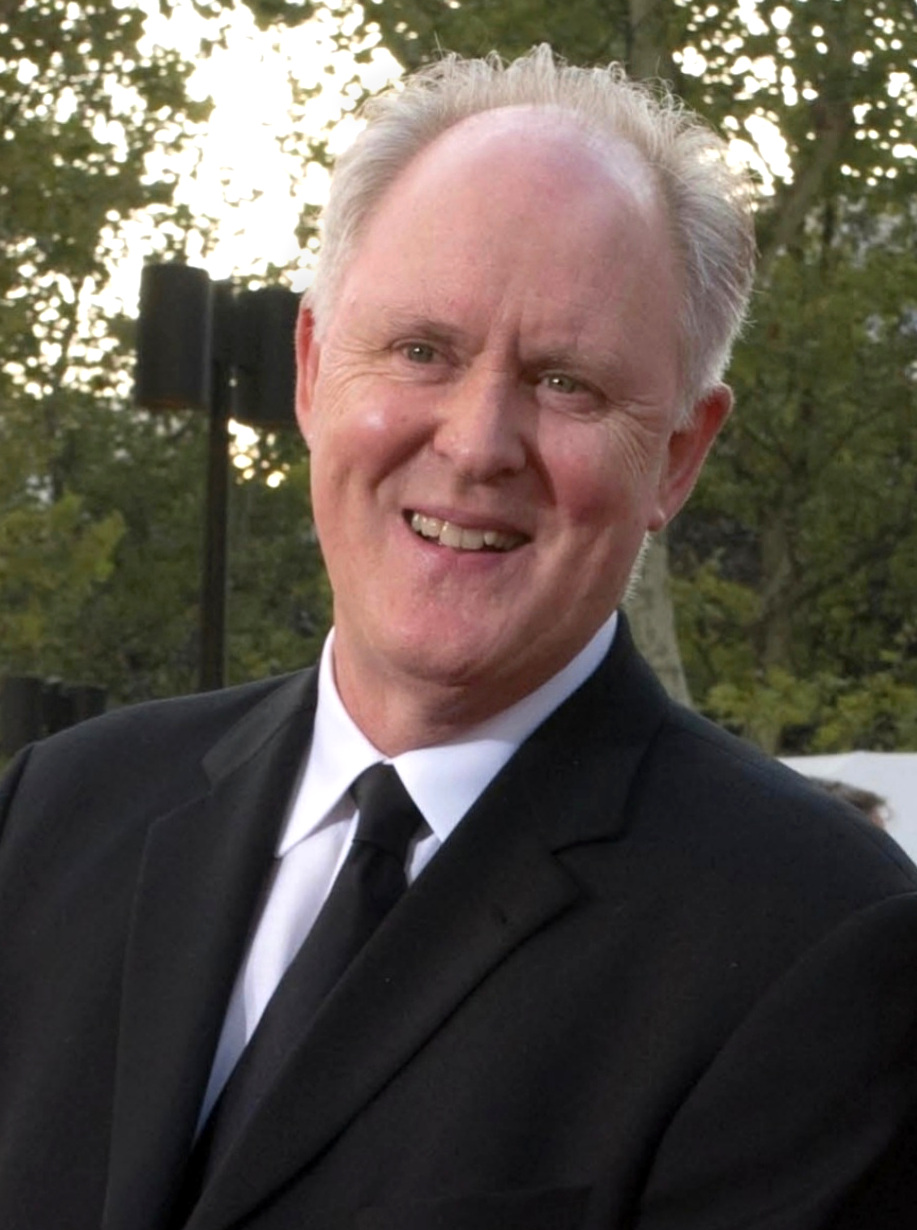
John Lithgow won for playing Winston Churchill in The Crown (2016)

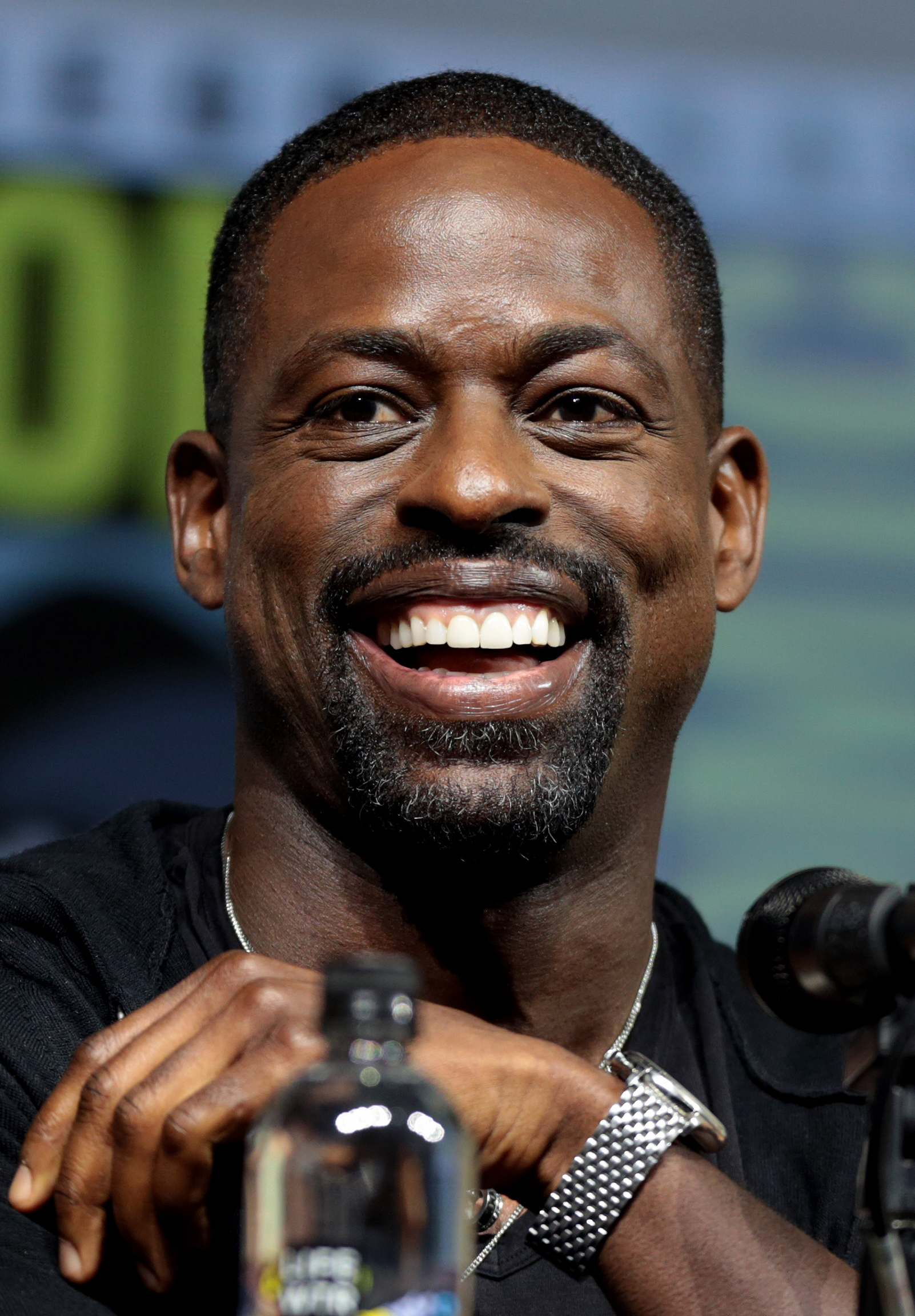
Sterling K. Brown won for This Is Us (2017)

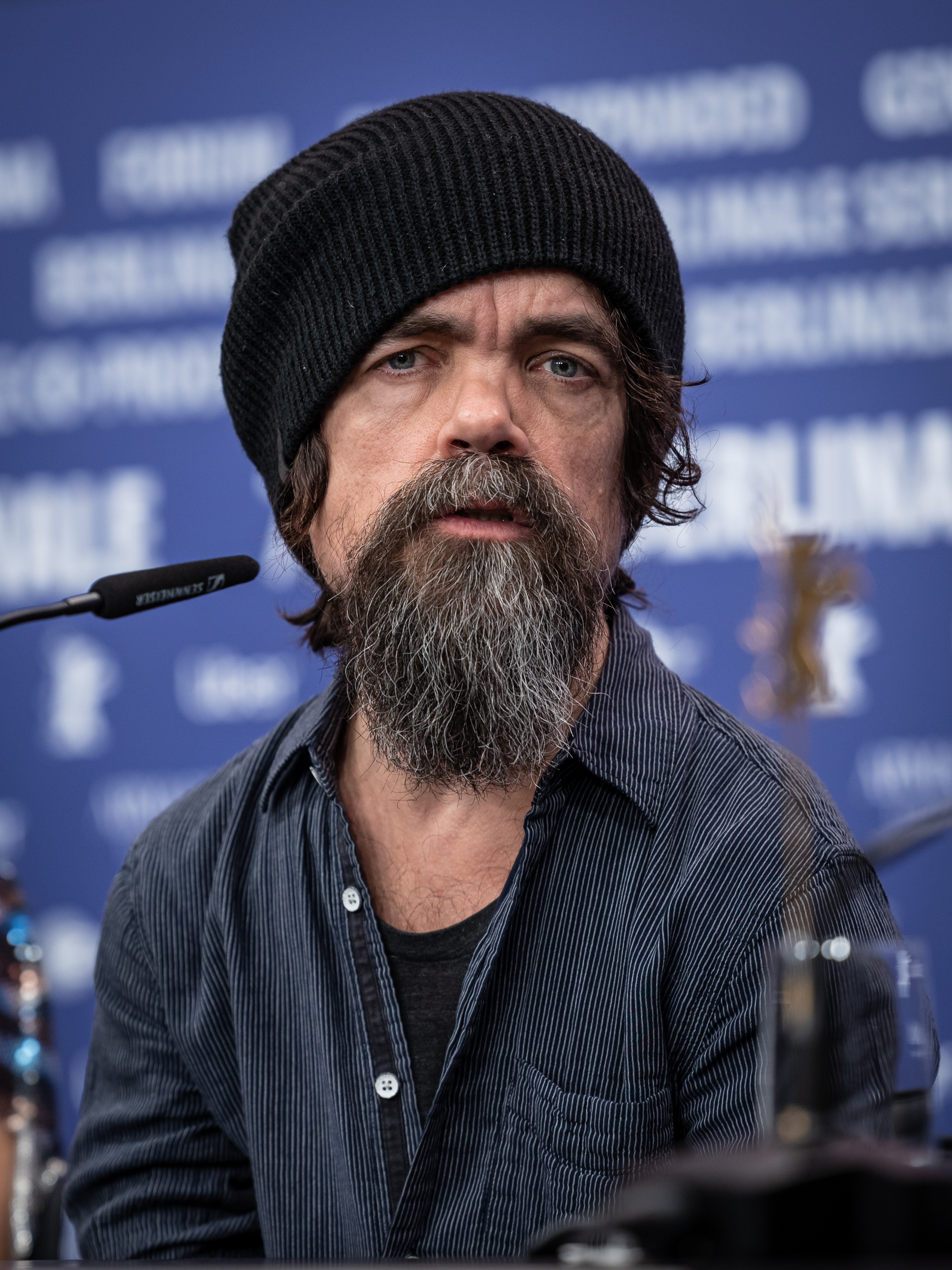
Peter Dinklage won for Game of Thrones (2019).

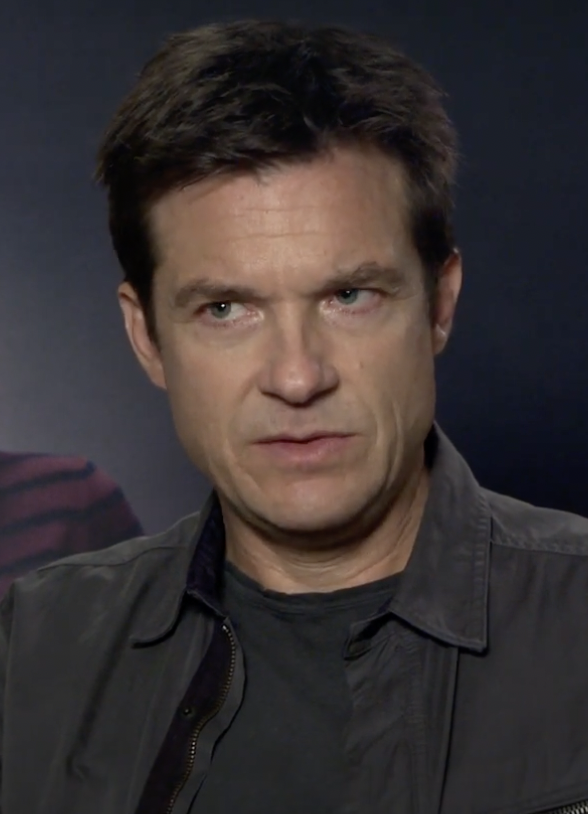
Jason Bateman won thrice for his role in Ozark (2018, 2020, and 2022)

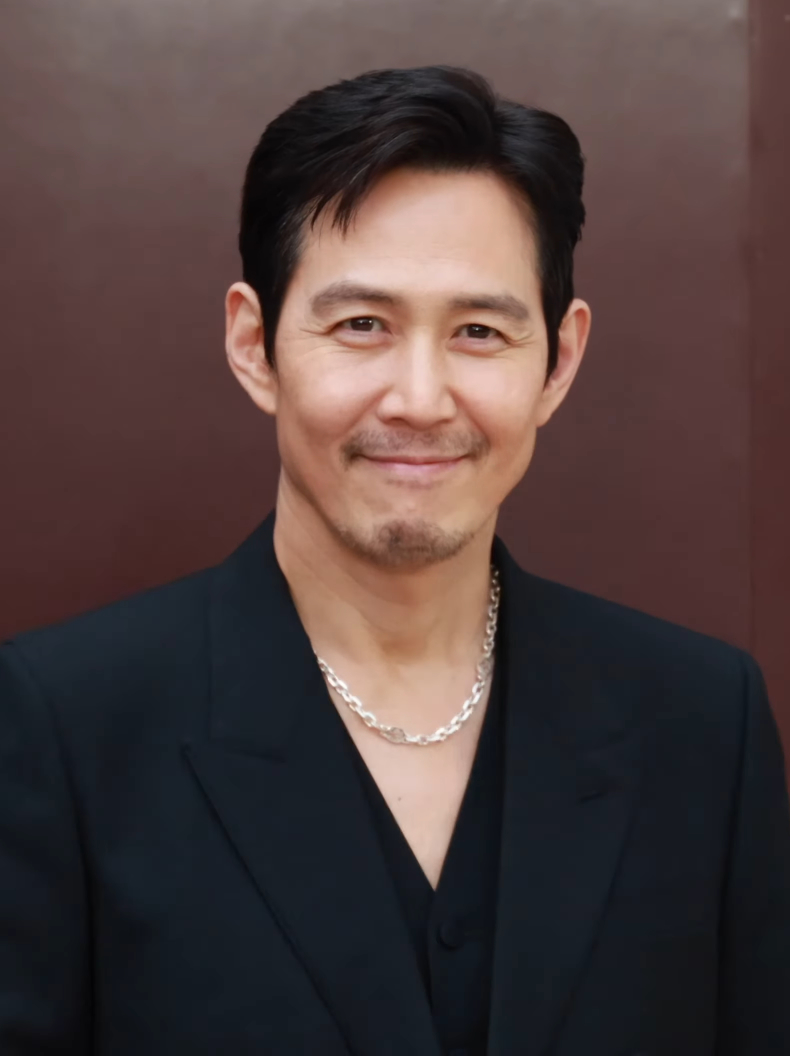
Lee Jung-jae won for Squid Game (2021)

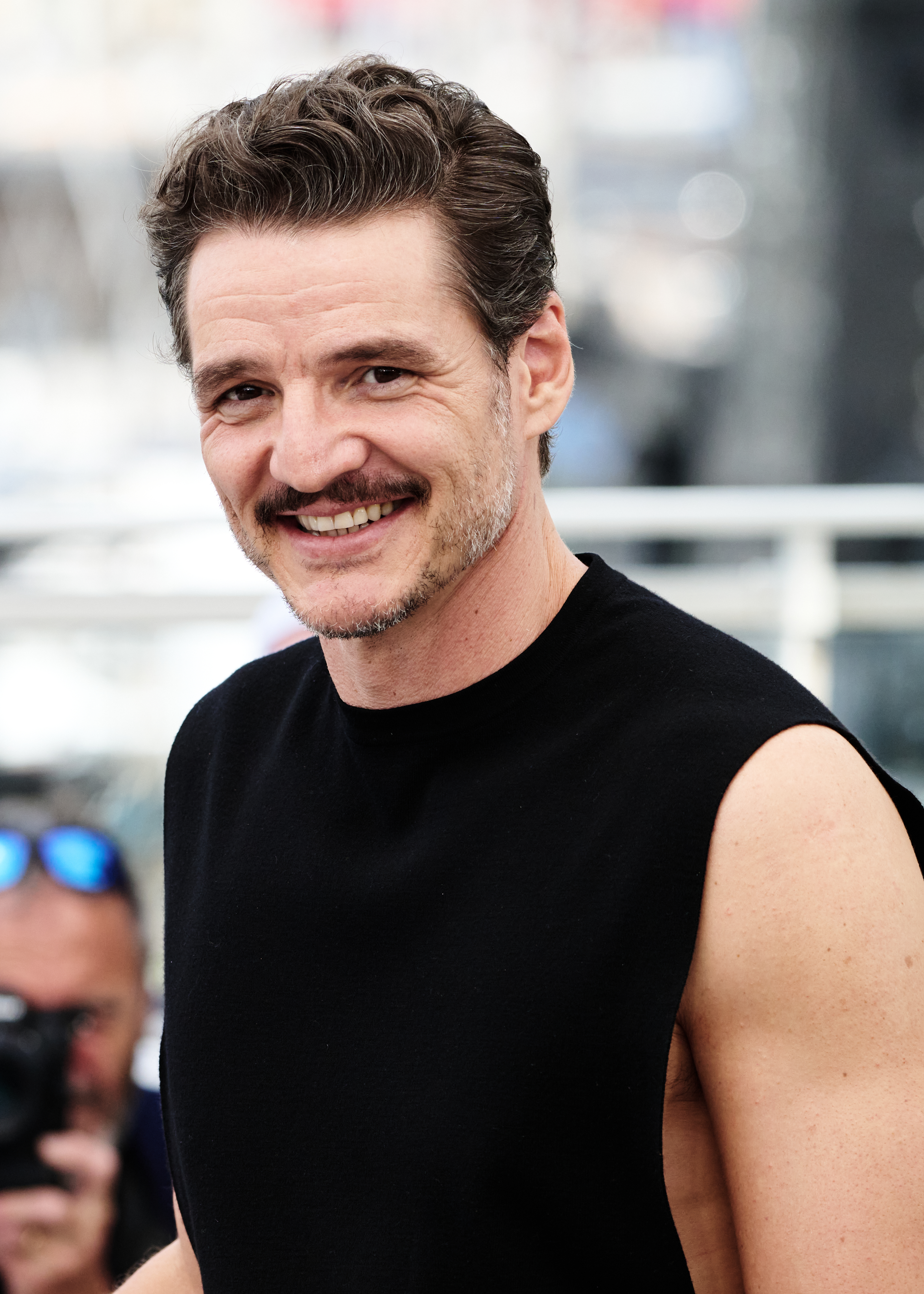
Pedro Pascal won for The Last of Us (2023)

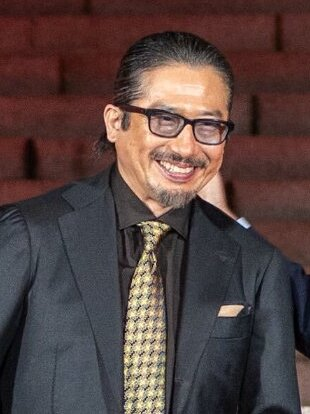
Hiroyuki Sanada won for Shōgun (2024).

=== 1990s ===
| Year | Actor | Film | Role(s) | Ref. |
|---|---|---|---|---|
| 1994 (1st) | Dennis Franz | NYPD Blue | Andy Sipowicz | |
| 1994 (1st) | Héctor Elizondo | Chicago Hope | Phillip Watters | |
| 1994 (1st) | Mandy Patinkin | Chicago Hope | Jeffrey Geiger | |
| 1994 (1st) | Tom Skerritt | Picket Fences | Jimmy Brock | |
| 1994 (1st) | Patrick Stewart | Star Trek: The Next Generation | Jean-Luc Picard | |
| 1995 (2nd) | Anthony Edwards | ER | Mark Greene | |
| 1995 (2nd) | George Clooney | ER | Doug Ross | |
| 1995 (2nd) | David Duchovny | The X-Files | Fox Mulder | |
| 1995 (2nd) | Dennis Franz | NYPD Blue | Andy Sipowicz | |
| 1995 (2nd) | Jimmy Smits | NYPD Blue | Bobby Simone | |
| 1996 (3rd) | Dennis Franz | NYPD Blue | Andy Sipowicz | |
| 1996 (3rd) | George Clooney | ER | Doug Ross | |
| 1996 (3rd) | Anthony Edwards | ER | Mark Greene | |
| 1996 (3rd) | David Duchovny | The X-Files | Fox Mulder | |
| 1996 (3rd) | Jimmy Smits | NYPD Blue | Bobby Simone | |
| 1997 (4th) | Anthony Edwards | ER | Mark Greene | |
| 1997 (4th) | David Duchovny | The X-Files | Fox Mulder | |
| 1997 (4th) | Dennis Franz | NYPD Blue | Andy Sipowicz | |
| 1997 (4th) | Jimmy Smits | NYPD Blue | Bobby Simone | |
| 1997 (4th) | Sam Waterston | Law & Order | Jack McCoy | |
| 1998 (5th) | Sam Waterston | Law & Order | Jack McCoy | |
| 1998 (5th) | David Duchovny | The X-Files | Fox Mulder | |
| 1998 (5th) | Anthony Edwards | ER | Mark Greene | |
| 1998 (5th) | Dennis Franz | NYPD Blue | Andy Sipowicz | |
| 1998 (5th) | Jimmy Smits | NYPD Blue | Bobby Simone | |
| 1999 (6th) | James Gandolfini | The Sopranos | Tony Soprano | |
| 1999 (6th) | David Duchovny | The X-Files | Fox Mulder | |
| 1999 (6th) | Dennis Franz | NYPD Blue | Andy Sipowicz | |
| 1999 (6th) | Rick Schroder | NYPD Blue | Danny Sorenson | |
| 1999 (6th) | Martin Sheen | The West Wing | Josiah Bartlet | |

=== 2000s ===
| Year | Actor | Film | Role(s) | Ref. |
|---|---|---|---|---|
| 2000 (7th) | Martin Sheen | The West Wing | Josiah Bartlet | |
| 2000 (7th) | Tim Daly | The Fugitive | Richard Kimble | |
| 2000 (7th) | Anthony Edwards | ER | Mark Greene | |
| 2000 (7th) | Dennis Franz | NYPD Blue | Andy Sipowicz | |
| 2000 (7th) | James Gandolfini | The Sopranos | Tony Soprano | |
| 2001 (8th) | Martin Sheen | The West Wing | Josiah Bartlet | |
| 2001 (8th) | Richard Dreyfuss | The Education of Max Bickford | Max Bickford | |
| 2001 (8th) | Dennis Franz | NYPD Blue | Andy Sipowicz | |
| 2001 (8th) | James Gandolfini | The Sopranos | Tony Soprano | |
| 2001 (8th) | Peter Krause | Six Feet Under | Nate Fisher | |
| 2002 (9th) | James Gandolfini | The Sopranos | Tony Soprano | |
| 2002 (9th) | Michael Chiklis | The Shield | Vic Mackey | |
| 2002 (9th) | Martin Sheen | The West Wing | Josiah Bartlet | |
| 2002 (9th) | Kiefer Sutherland | 24 | Jack Bauer | |
| 2002 (9th) | Treat Williams | Everwood | Andy Brown | |
| 2003 (10th) | Kiefer Sutherland | 24 | Jack Bauer | |
| 2003 (10th) | Peter Krause | Six Feet Under | Nate Fisher | |
| 2003 (10th) | Anthony LaPaglia | Without a Trace | Jack Malone | |
| 2003 (10th) | Martin Sheen | The West Wing | Josiah Bartlet | |
| 2003 (10th) | Treat Williams | Everwood | Andy Brown | |
| 2004 (11th) | Jerry Orbach (posthumous) | Law & Order | Lennie Briscoe | |
| 2004 (11th) | Hank Azaria | Huff | Craig Huffstodt | |
| 2004 (11th) | James Gandolfini | The Sopranos | Tony Soprano | |
| 2004 (11th) | Anthony LaPaglia | Without a Trace | Jack Malone | |
| 2004 (11th) | Kiefer Sutherland | 24 | Jack Bauer | |
| 2005 (12th) | Kiefer Sutherland | 24 | Jack Bauer | |
| 2005 (12th) | Alan Alda | The West Wing | Arnold Vinick | |
| 2005 (12th) | Patrick Dempsey | Grey's Anatomy | Derek Shepherd | |
| 2005 (12th) | Hugh Laurie | House | Gregory House | |
| 2005 (12th) | Ian McShane | Deadwood | Al Swearengen | |
| 2006 (13th) | Hugh Laurie | House | Gregory House | |
| 2006 (13th) | James Gandolfini | The Sopranos | Tony Soprano | |
| 2006 (13th) | Michael C. Hall | Dexter | Dexter Morgan | |
| 2006 (13th) | James Spader | Boston Legal | Alan Shore | |
| 2006 (13th) | Kiefer Sutherland | 24 | Jack Bauer | |
| 2007 (14th) | James Gandolfini | The Sopranos | Tony Soprano | |
| 2007 (14th) | Michael C. Hall | Dexter | Dexter Morgan | |
| 2007 (14th) | Jon Hamm | Mad Men | Don Draper | |
| 2007 (14th) | Hugh Laurie | House | Gregory House | |
| 2007 (14th) | James Spader | Boston Legal | Alan Shore | |
| 2008 (15th) | Hugh Laurie | House | Gregory House | |
| 2008 (15th) | Michael C. Hall | Dexter | Dexter Morgan | |
| 2008 (15th) | Jon Hamm | Mad Men | Don Draper | |
| 2008 (15th) | William Shatner | Boston Legal | Denny Crane | |
| 2008 (15th) | James Spader | Boston Legal | Alan Shore | |
| 2009 (16th) | Michael C. Hall | Dexter | Dexter Morgan | |
| 2009 (16th) | Simon Baker | The Mentalist | Patrick Jane | |
| 2009 (16th) | Bryan Cranston | Breaking Bad | Walter White | |
| 2009 (16th) | Jon Hamm | Mad Men | Don Draper | |
| 2009 (16th) | Hugh Laurie | House | Gregory House | |

=== 2010s ===
| Year | Actor | Film | Role(s) | Ref. |
|---|---|---|---|---|
| 2010 (17th) | Steve Buscemi | Boardwalk Empire | Nucky Thompson | |
| 2010 (17th) | Bryan Cranston | Breaking Bad | Walter White | |
| 2010 (17th) | Michael C. Hall | Dexter | Dexter Morgan | |
| 2010 (17th) | Jon Hamm | Mad Men | Don Draper | |
| 2010 (17th) | Hugh Laurie | House | Gregory House | |
| 2011 (18th) | Steve Buscemi | Boardwalk Empire | Nucky Thompson | |
| 2011 (18th) | Patrick J. Adams | Suits | Mike Ross | |
| 2011 (18th) | Kyle Chandler | Friday Night Lights | Eric Taylor | |
| 2011 (18th) | Bryan Cranston | Breaking Bad | Walter White | |
| 2011 (18th) | Michael C. Hall | Dexter | Dexter Morgan | |
| 2012 (19th) | Bryan Cranston | Breaking Bad | Walter White | |
| 2012 (19th) | Steve Buscemi | Boardwalk Empire | Nucky Thompson | |
| 2012 (19th) | Jeff Daniels | The Newsroom | Will McAvoy | |
| 2012 (19th) | Jon Hamm | Mad Men | Don Draper | |
| 2012 (19th) | Damian Lewis | Homeland | Nicholas Brody | |
| 2013 (20th) | Bryan Cranston | Breaking Bad | Walter White | |
| 2013 (20th) | Steve Buscemi | Boardwalk Empire | Nucky Thompson | |
| 2013 (20th) | Jeff Daniels | The Newsroom | Will McAvoy | |
| 2013 (20th) | Peter Dinklage | Game of Thrones | Tyrion Lannister | |
| 2013 (20th) | Kevin Spacey | House of Cards | Francis Underwood | |
| 2014 (21st) | Kevin Spacey | House of Cards | Francis Underwood | |
| 2014 (21st) | Steve Buscemi | Boardwalk Empire | Nucky Thompson | |
| 2014 (21st) | Peter Dinklage | Game of Thrones | Tyrion Lannister | |
| 2014 (21st) | Woody Harrelson | True Detective | Martin Hart | |
| 2014 (21st) | Matthew McConaughey | True Detective | Rust Cohle | |
| 2015 (22nd) | Kevin Spacey | House of Cards | Francis Underwood | |
| 2015 (22nd) | Peter Dinklage | Game of Thrones | Tyrion Lannister | |
| 2015 (22nd) | Jon Hamm | Mad Men | Don Draper | |
| 2015 (22nd) | Rami Malek | Mr. Robot | Elliot Alderson | |
| 2015 (22nd) | Bob Odenkirk | Better Call Saul | Jimmy McGill | |
| 2016 (23rd) | John Lithgow | The Crown | Winston Churchill | |
| 2016 (23rd) | Sterling K. Brown | This Is Us | Randall Pearson | |
| 2016 (23rd) | Peter Dinklage | Game of Thrones | Tyrion Lannister | |
| 2016 (23rd) | Rami Malek | Mr. Robot | Elliot Alderson | |
| 2016 (23rd) | Kevin Spacey | House of Cards | Francis Underwood | |
| 2017 (24th) | Sterling K. Brown | This Is Us | Randall Pearson | |
| 2017 (24th) | Jason Bateman | Ozark | Marty Byrde | |
| 2017 (24th) | Peter Dinklage | Game of Thrones | Tyrion Lannister | |
| 2017 (24th) | David Harbour | Stranger Things | Jim Hopper | |
| 2017 (24th) | Bob Odenkirk | Better Call Saul | Jimmy McGill | |
| 2018 (25th) | Jason Bateman | Ozark | Marty Byrde | |
| 2018 (25th) | Sterling K. Brown | This Is Us | Randall Pearson | |
| 2018 (25th) | Joseph Fiennes | The Handmaid's Tale | Commander Fred Waterford | |
| 2018 (25th) | John Krasinski | Tom Clancy's Jack Ryan | Jack Ryan | |
| 2018 (25th) | Bob Odenkirk | Better Call Saul | Jimmy McGill | |
| 2019 (26th) | Peter Dinklage | Game of Thrones | Tyrion Lannister | |
| 2019 (26th) | Sterling K. Brown | This Is Us | Randall Pearson | |
| 2019 (26th) | Steve Carell | The Morning Show | Mitch Kessler | |
| 2019 (26th) | Billy Crudup | The Morning Show | Corey Ellison | |
| 2019 (26th) | David Harbour | Stranger Things | Jim Hopper | |

=== 2020s ===
| Year | Actor | Film | Role(s) | Ref. |
|---|---|---|---|---|
| 2020 (27th) | Jason Bateman | Ozark | Marty Bryde | |
| 2020 (27th) | Sterling K. Brown | This Is Us | Randall Pearson | |
| 2020 (27th) | Josh O'Connor | The Crown | Prince Charles | |
| 2020 (27th) | Bob Odenkirk | Better Call Saul | Jimmy McGill | |
| 2020 (27th) | Regé-Jean Page | Bridgerton | Simon Basset, Duke of Hastings | |
| 2021 (28th) | Lee Jung-jae | Squid Game | Seong Gi-hun | |
| 2021 (28th) | Brian Cox | Succession | Logan Roy | |
| 2021 (28th) | Billy Crudup | The Morning Show | Cory Ellison | |
| 2021 (28th) | Kieran Culkin | Succession | Roman Roy | |
| 2021 (28th) | Jeremy Strong | Succession | Kendall Roy | |
| 2022 (29th) | Jason Bateman | Ozark | Marty Bryde | |
| 2022 (29th) | Jonathan Banks | Better Call Saul | Mike Ehrmantraut | |
| 2022 (29th) | Jeff Bridges | The Old Man | Dan Chase | |
| 2022 (29th) | Bob Odenkirk | Better Call Saul | Jimmy McGill / Saul Goodman / Gene Takavic | |
| 2022 (29th) | Adam Scott | Severance | Mark Scout / Mark S. | |
| 2023 (30th) | Pedro Pascal | The Last of Us | Joel Miller | |
| 2023 (30th) | Brian Cox | Succession | Logan Roy | |
| 2023 (30th) | Billy Crudup | The Morning Show | Cory Ellison | |
| 2023 (30th) | Kieran Culkin | Succession | Roman Roy | |
| 2023 (30th) | Matthew Macfadyen | Succession | Tom Wambsgans | |
| 2024 (31st) | Hiroyuki Sanada | Shōgun | Lord Yoshii Toranaga | |
| 2024 (31st) | Tadanobu Asano | Shōgun | Kashigi Yabushige | |
| 2024 (31st) | Jeff Bridges | The Old Man | Dan Chase | |
| 2024 (31st) | Gary Oldman | Slow Horses | Jackson Lamb | |
| 2024 (31st) | Eddie Redmayne | The Day of the Jackal | The Jackal | |
2025 (32nd)
| 2025 (32nd) | Noah Wyle | The Pitt | Michael "Robby" Robinavitch | |
| 2025 (32nd) | Sterling K. Brown | Paradise | Xavier Collins | |
| 2025 (32nd) | Billy Crudup | The Morning Show | Cory Ellison | |
| 2025 (32nd) | Walton Goggins | The White Lotus | Rick Hatchett | |
| 2025 (32nd) | Gary Oldman | Slow Horses | Jackson Lamb | |

== Superlatives ==
| Superlative | Male Actor - Drama Series | | Male Actor - Comedy Series | | Overall | |
|---|---|---|---|---|---|---|
| Actor with most awards | Jason Bateman, James Gandolfini | 3 | Alec Baldwin | 7 | Alec Baldwin | 7 |
| Actor with most nominations | Dennis Franz | 8 | Tony Shalhoub | 9 | Tony Shalhoub | 9 |
| Actor with most nominations without ever winning | Jon Hamm | 6 | Kelsey Grammer | 8 | Kelsey Grammer | 8 |
| Television program with most wins | Ozark, The Sopranos | 3 | 30 Rock | 7 | 30 Rock | 7 |
| Television program with most nominations | NYPD Blue | 13 | Frasier | 16 | Frasier | 16 |

== Actors with multiple awards ==
3 wins

- Jason Bateman
- James Gandolfini

2 wins

- Steve Buscemi
- Bryan Cranston
- Anthony Edwards
- Dennis Franz
- Hugh Laurie
- Martin Sheen
- Kevin Spacey
- Kiefer Sutherland

== Series with multiple awards ==
3 wins

- Ozark (Netflix)
- The Sopranos (HBO)

2 wins

- 24 (Fox)
- Boardwalk Empire (HBO)
- Breaking Bad (AMC)
- ER (NBC)
- House (Fox)
- House of Cards (Netflix)
- Law & Order (NBC)
- NYPD Blue (ABC)
- The West Wing (NBC)

== Actors with multiple nominations ==
8 nominations

- Dennis Franz

7 nominations

- James Gandolfini

6 nominations

- Sterling K. Brown
- Peter Dinklage
- Michael C. Hall
- Jon Hamm
- Hugh Laurie

5 nominations

- Steve Buscemi
- Bryan Cranston
- David Duchovny
- Anthony Edwards
- Bob Odenkirk
- Martin Sheen
- Kiefer Sutherland

4 nominations

- Jason Bateman
- Billy Crudup
- Jimmy Smits
- Kevin Spacey

3 nominations

- James Spader

2 nominations

- Jeff Bridges
- George Clooney
- Brian Cox
- Kieran Culkin
- Jeff Daniels
- David Harbour
- Peter Krause
- Anthony LaPaglia
- Rami Malek
- Gary Oldman
- Sam Waterston
- Treat Williams

== Series with multiple nominations ==
13 nominations

- NYPD Blue (ABC)

7 nominations

- ER (ABC)
- The Sopranos (HBO)

6 nominations

- Better Call Saul (AMC)
- Dexter (Showtime)
- Game of Thrones (HBO)
- House (Fox)
- Mad Men (AMC)
- Succession (HBO)
- The West Wing (NBC)

5 nominations

- 24 (Fox)
- Boardwalk Empire (HBO)
- Breaking Bad (AMC)
- The Morning Show (Apple TV)
- This Is Us (NBC)

4 nominations

- Boston Legal (ABC)
- House of Cards (Netflix)
- Ozark (Netflix)
- The X-Files (Fox)

3 nominations

- Law & Order (NBC)

2 nominations

- Chicago Hope (CBS)
- The Crown (Netflix)
- Everwood (The WB)
- Mr. Robot (USA)
- The Newsroom (HBO)
- The Old Man (FX)
- Shōgun (FX)
- Six Feet Under (HBO)
- Slow Horses (Apple TV)
- Stranger Things (Netflix)
- True Detective (HBO)
- Without a Trace (CBS)

== See also ==
- Primetime Emmy Award for Outstanding Lead Actor in a Drama Series
- Primetime Emmy Award for Outstanding Supporting Actor in a Drama Series
- Golden Globe Award for Best Actor – Television Series Drama
