= My Dead Boyfriend =

- Film poster
- Directed by: Anthony Edwards
- Screenplay by: Billy Morrissette
- Based on: Dogrun by Arthur Nersesian
- Produced by: Jen Gatien
- Starring: Heather Graham; Katherine Moennig; Scott Michael Foster; John Corbett
- Cinematography: Aaron Phillips
- Edited by: Andy Keir
- Music by: Mark Wike
- Production companies: Cohen Media Group; Cohen Film Collection
- Distributed by: Orion Pictures; Momentum Pictures
- Release date: November 3, 2016
- Running time: 90 minutes
- Country: United States
- Language: English

My Dead Boyfriend is a 2016 American comedy film directed by Anthony Edwards and starring Heather Graham, Katherine Moennig, Scott Michael Foster, and John Corbett. The film is based on Arthur Nersesian's 2000 novel Dogrun.

It was released on November 3, 2016 by Orion Pictures and Momentum Pictures.

== Plot ==
Mary's life has been defined by a string of temp jobs and a half-hearted attempt to become a writer, but all that changes when she comes home to find her couch potato boyfriend dead in front of the TV set.

== Cast ==
- Heather Graham as Mary McCrawley
- Scott Michael Foster as Howard
- Katherine Moennig as Zoey Bryant
- Griffin Dunne as Kaleb Giles
- John Corbett as Primo Schultz
- Martha Millan as Sue Watt
- Lizzi Bougatsos as Marilyn
- Angela Featherstone as Norma
- Viola Harris as Ms. Schulz
- Gina Gershon as Helene
- Andre Ward as Miss Vicki
- Edwin Cahill as Ted
- Isa McCutcheon as Herman
- Bailey Edwards as Jeff
- Poppy Fields as Frankie
- Jennifer Regan as Minnie
- Tina Huang as Stripper Mimi
- Lady Bunny as Drag Queen

== Reception ==
The film received negative reviews and has a 0% rating on Rotten Tomatoes based on reviews from 11 critics. On Metacritic the film has a score of 25% based on reviews from 6 critics.

Neil Genzlinger of The New York Times wrote that the film "desperately tries to look and sound like a quirky indie hit, but that’s not an achievable goal when you have an unlikable lead character indifferently rendered by a name star."

Frank Scheck of The Hollywood Reporter wrote that the film "never achieves a consistent narrative or stylistic tone. Instead, it relies far too heavily on the charms of its wide-eyed star, who, despite her best efforts, can't overcome the fact that her role should be played by a much younger actress. Twenty years ago, this comedy might have been a slightly amusing diversion. Now it just exudes an air of sweaty desperation."

Christy Lemire of RogerEbert.com gave the film one star.
