= Powerhouse (TV series) =

- Title card
- Created by: Ira H. Klugerman; Ruth Pollak
- Developed by: Educational Film Center
- Written by: Ruth Pollak
- Directed by: John Gray; Michael Switzer
- Creative director: Johnson B. Gordon
- Presented by: Elizabeth Johnson
- Starring: Sandra Bowie; Domenica Galati; Jason Kravits; Michael Mack; Jessica Prentice; Michael Wikes
- Voices of: Mark Gordon
- Theme music composer: Richard Paul Brier (theme)
- Opening theme: "The Powerhouse Is You!"
- Ending theme: "The Powerhouse Is You!"
- Composer: Fred Karns (score)
- Country of origin: United States
- Original language: English
- No. of seasons: 1
- No. of episodes: 16

Production
- Executive producer: Simon Spenscer
- Producers: Ira H. Klugerman; Martin Sonnenberg
- Production location: Washington, D.C.
- Cinematography: Tom Richmond
- Editor: Terry Halle
- Camera setup: 16-millimeter film
- Running time: 28 minutes

Original release
- Network: PBS
- Release: December 12, 1982 – January 3, 1983

Powerhouse is an American television series produced by the Educational Film Center at Northern Virginia ETV, which aired on PBS for 16 episodes in 1982. It was billed as "a 16-part series for young people and their families," with the target audience being primarily children, preteens, teenagers, and young adults. The series was later rerun by Nickelodeon from 1984 to 1986.

== Premise ==
Set in Washington, D.C., Powerhouse is focused on the adventures of a racially and ethnically diverse group of three teenagers, two kids, and one adult from the inner city, based at a former boxing and sports gym hangout turned into a youth community center. The center was founded by Brenda Gaines, a woman who inherited the property from her late father, PowerHouse Gaines, a legendary boxer. The basic message of the series is that every person is a source of creativity and of true positive "I Can" power expressed in the lyrics of the show's theme song as "We all have a Powerhouse deep down inside".

Each episode deals with significant personal issues affecting young people, such as alcoholism, peer pressure, and physical fitness, combined with fast-paced action-adventure stories in which the group often has to solve a mystery or prevent a crime. For example, in one episode they have to expose the head of a racketeering operation that threatens to put Brenda and Powerhouse out of business. In another episode, they try to locate the source of a potentially lethal food-poisoning outbreak.

Episodes were presented in two acts, with a break in between, while two additional breaks bookended each episode; the breaks were filled by "uncommercials", short clips designed to convey ideas potentially of interest to the series' target audience (such as health, fitness and cultural diversity). Another Powerhouse feature was a salute to a particular youth organization, such as the Boy Scouts of America, which preceded at least one of the uncommercials.

== Characters ==
- Brenda Gaines (Sandra Bowie) is the founder of Powerhouse, which was originally her father's gymnasium. She turns it into an after-school youth center, which the five teenagers eventually join. Brenda is the leader as well the mother of the Powerhouse gang and the de facto authority figure, although she treats the five teens as equals.
- Jennifer LaBianca (Domenica Galati) is a friendly teenager and owner of the Powerhouse van, who has a strong aptitude for mechanics.
- Kevin Jackson (Michael Mack) is the eldest of the five teenagers. He is the rock of the Powerhouse gang, who acts as a big brother to the younger characters.
- Lolo Knopke (Jason Kravits) is insecure about his appearance because he is very short and has to wear glasses, giving him the appearance of a stereotypical nerd, but he is also one of the smartest members of the group.
- Pepper McKenzie (Jessica Prentice) is one of the most outgoing members of the group, despite being the youngest. She is impulsive and adventurous, and is prone to finding herself in trouble.
- Tony Dominguez (Michael Wikes) is a streetwise 17-year-old. He is a good person at heart but sometimes feels like he has to play the tough guy to mask his insecurities.

== Episodes ==
No.	Title	Directed by	Written by	Original release date
1	"With a Little Help From My Friends: Part 1"	Unknown	Patrick Prentice	December 8, 1982
Brenda Gaines inherits her late father's gym, Powerhouse, intending to convert it into a youth center. She receives help from Jennifer LaBianca, Kevin Jackson, Tony Dominguez, Lolo Knopke and Pepper McKenzie, but their efforts are threatened by a gang led by the mysterious Castor.
2	"With a Little Help From My Friends: Part 2"	Unknown	Patrick Prentice	December 9, 1982
Having been framed for a crime she didn't commit, Brenda tries to learn Castor's identity and successfully open Powerhouse.
3	"Life or Breath"	Michael Switzer	Mark Stambler	December 10, 1982
The son of a foreign ambassador is kidnapped, and the Powerhouse gang urgently attempts to find and rescue him, as he needs medicine for a stress-related illness.
4	"Master of the Art"	Diana Enyedi	Carolyn Miller	December 13, 1982
When an artifact is delivered to a local museum, the Powerhouse gang and the curator attempt to prove that there are flaws with the museum's alarm system.
5	"You Make Me Sick"	Michael Switzer	David Harris	December 14, 1982
When people all over town contract a fatal virus, the gang sets out to find the cause. Their task becomes more urgent when Brenda herself catches the virus after taking a bite of a tainted tunafish sandwich.
6	"Celebration"	Unknown	Ruth Pollak	December 17, 1982
Lolo decides to call off his Bar Mitzvah after he and his grandfather become victims of a hate crime.
7	"Something for Nothing"	John Gray	Robert Snodgrass	December 20, 1982
Brenda temporarily closes Powerhouse following an accident that hurts Lolo. While she goes to New York to get money for repairs, the kids decide to film a commercial about Powerhouse, unaware that they are being scammed by a crooked landowner and his accomplice.
8	"Cheers"	John Allman	Raymond Serra	December 21, 1982
Pepper and Lt. Al Gambrino's son Peter learn the hard way about the dangers of drinking excessively.
9	"Name of the Game"	Paul Dunlap	Patrick Prentice	December 23, 1982
Both Tony's foot injury and the antagonistic behavior of new team player El Gato threaten Powerhouse's chances of winning the championship soccer game.
10	"One of the Gang"	John Allman	Jack Zafran	December 24, 1982
Kevin refuses help from Mike, a boy with a prosthetic arm. Meanwhile, at a nursing home, elderly resident Diamonds O'Toole is targeted by a thief posing as an orderly, who tries to torture him into revealing the location of diamonds he hid somewhere in Powerhouse.
11	"Something Ventured"	Herb Skoble	Patrick Prentice	December 27, 1982
The Powerhouse gang and Brenda attempt to identify the perpetrator of a series of burglaries. In this episode, Kevin is Brenda's son, and Bobby and Bizzy are later renamed Tony and Pepper. Also, both the gang and Powerhouse are already established.
12	"Help Wanted"	John Gray	Patrick Prentice	December 28, 1982
Tammy DeWitt arrives with her baby son David, and the Powerhouse gang tries to work out whether she kidnapped him.
13	"What Have You Got to Lose?"	Michael Switzer	Ruth Pollak	December 29, 1982
Kevin and his boss Mr. Baxter agree to try a doctor's weight-loss program.
14	"Big Devil"	Michael Switzer	Judy Bornstein; Wendy Wilson	December 30, 1982
Angie tries to prove herself as a female jockey by riding Big Devil.
15	"Fit to Be Tied"	Michael Switzer	Jack Zafran	December 31, 1982
When a visitor's brother is kidnapped by people who want a microfilm, the Powerhouse gang try to rescue him.
16	"The Short Life of Lolo Knopke"	John Gray	Patrick Prentice	January 3, 1983
A bomb goes off at Powerhouse that kills Lolo. Brenda, Jennifer, and Kevin recount all the times he helped solve crimes and problems. But nothing is what it appears to be.
