= List of awards and nominations received by Robin Wright =

Robin Wright awards and nominations
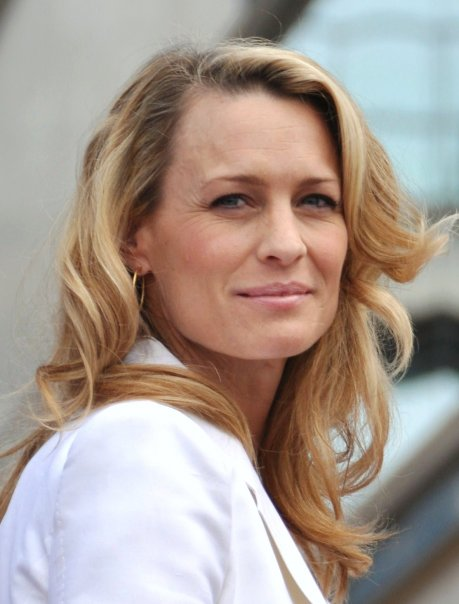
- Wright at the 2009 Cannes Film Festival
Awards and nominations
Award	Wins	Nominations
Critics' Choice	0	4
Emmy Awards	0	11
Golden Globes	1	5
SAG Awards	0	10

Totals (Note: Certain award groups do not simply award one winner. They acknowledge several different recipients, have runners-up, and have third place. Since this is a specific recognition and is different from losing an award, runner-up mentions are considered wins in this award tally. For simplification and to avoid errors, each award in this list has been presumed to have had a prior nomination.)
- Wins: 6
- Nominations: 65

This article is a list of awards and nominations received by Robin Wright.

Robin Wright is an American actress who has received various awards and nominations, including a Golden Globe Award as well as nominations for eight Primetime Emmy Awards, three Daytime Emmy Awards, three Critics' Choice Television Awards, and ten Screen Actors Guild Awards.

Wright started her career in a guest role in the soap opera The Yellow Rose from 1983 to 1984. She gained prominence portraying Kelly Capwell in the NBC Daytime soap opera Santa Barbara from 1984 to 1988. The role earned her three consecutive nominations for the Daytime Emmy Award for Outstanding Younger Actress in a Drama Series. The role also earned her two Soap Opera Digest Awards nominations with a win for Outstanding Heroine: Daytime in 1988. She made her feature film debut as a supporting role in the sex comedy Hollywood Vice Squad (1986).

On film, she gained her breakthrough as Princess Buttercup in the Rob Reiner fantasy romance The Princess Bride (1987), for which she was nominated for the Saturn Award for Best Actress. She gained further stardom playing the troubled love interest Jenny Curran in the Robert Zemeckis directed comedy-drama epic Forrest Gump (1994) for which she was nominated for the Golden Globe Award for Best Supporting Actress – Motion Picture and the Screen Actors Guild Award for Outstanding Actress in a Supporting Role. She took a part in the romance drama She's So Lovely (1997) for which she was nominated for the Screen Actors Guild Award for Outstanding Actress in a Leading Role.

Wright is also known for her performances in independent film starring as a woman involved in an abusive relationship in the psychological thriller Loved (1997) for which she was nominated for the Independent Spirit Award for Best Female Lead. She played a woman reunited with a former lover in the anthology drama film Nine Lives (2005), for which she won the Locarno International Film Festival Best Actress Award as well as nominations for the Independent Spirit Award for Best Supporting Female and the Gotham Award for Best Ensemble Performance. For her role as an anxious network producer in the drama Sorry, Haters (2005) she was nominated for the Independent Spirit Award for Best Female Lead.

On television, she acted in the HBO limited series Empire Falls (2005) for which she was nominated for the Screen Actors Guild Award for Outstanding Actress in a Miniseries or TV Movie. She gained further acclaim for her portrayal of Claire Underwood in the Netflix political drama series House of Cards (2013–2017) for which she won the Golden Globe Award for Best Actress – Television Series Drama and was nominated for three Critics' Choice Television Awards for Best Actress in a Drama Series and six Primetime Emmy Awards for Outstanding Lead Actress in a Drama Series. As a producer, she received nominations for two Primetime Emmy Awards and a Producers Guild Award.

== Major associations ==
=== Critics' Choice Awards ===
Year	Category	Nominated work	Result	Ref.
Critics' Choice Television Awards
2014	Best Actress in a Drama Series	House of Cards	Nominated	
2016	Best Actress in a Drama Series	House of Cards	Nominated	
2018	Best Actress in a Drama Series	House of Cards	Nominated	
2025	Best Actress in a Movie/Miniseries	The Girlfriend	Nominated	

=== Emmy Awards ===
Year	Category	Nominated work	Result	Ref.
Primetime Emmy Awards
2013	Outstanding Lead Actress in a Drama Series	House of Cards	Nominated	
2014	Outstanding Lead Actress in a Drama Series	House of Cards	Nominated	
2015	Outstanding Lead Actress in a Drama Series	House of Cards	Nominated	
2016	Outstanding Lead Actress in a Drama Series	House of Cards	Nominated	
2016	Outstanding Drama Series	House of Cards	Nominated	
2017	Outstanding Drama Series	House of Cards	Nominated	
2017	Outstanding Lead Actress in a Drama Series	House of Cards	Nominated	
2019	Outstanding Lead Actress in a Drama Series	House of Cards	Nominated	
Daytime Emmy Awards
1986	Outstanding Younger Actress in a Drama Series	Santa Barbara	Nominated	
1987	Outstanding Younger Actress in a Drama Series	Santa Barbara	Nominated	
1988	Outstanding Younger Actress in a Drama Series	Santa Barbara	Nominated	

=== Golden Globe Awards ===
Year	Category	Nominated work	Result	Ref.
1994	Best Supporting Actress – Motion Picture	Forrest Gump	Nominated	
2013	Best Actress – Television Series Drama	House of Cards	Won	
2014	Best Actress – Television Series Drama	House of Cards	Nominated	
2015	Best Actress – Television Series Drama	House of Cards	Nominated	
2025	Best Actress – Miniseries or Television Film	The Girlfriend	Nominated	

=== Screen Actors Guild Awards ===
Year	Category	Nominated work	Result	Ref.
1994	Outstanding Female Actor in a Supporting Role	Forrest Gump	Nominated	
1997	Outstanding Female Actor in a Leading Role	She's So Lovely	Nominated	
2005	Outstanding Female Actor in a Miniseries or Movie	Empire Falls	Nominated	
2014	Outstanding Female Actor in a Drama Series	House of Cards	Nominated	
2014	Outstanding Ensemble in a Drama Series	House of Cards	Nominated	
2015	Outstanding Ensemble in a Drama Series	House of Cards	Nominated	
2015	Outstanding Female Actor in a Drama Series	House of Cards	Nominated	
2016	Outstanding Female Actor in a Drama Series	House of Cards	Nominated	
2017	Outstanding Female Actor in a Drama Series	House of Cards	Nominated	
2018	Outstanding Female Actor in a Drama Series	House of Cards	Nominated	

== Miscellaneous awards ==
Organizations	Year	Category	Nominated work	Result	Ref.
Blockbuster Entertainment Awards	1999	Favorite Actress – Drama/Romance	Message in a Bottle	Nominated	
Blockbuster Entertainment Awards	2000	Favorite Supporting Actress – Suspense	Unbreakable	Nominated	
British Independent Film Awards	2006	Best Actress	Breaking and Entering	Nominated	
Gold Derby Awards	2014	Best Actress in a Drama Series	House of Cards	Nominated	
Gold Derby Awards	2015	Best Actress in a Drama Series	House of Cards	Nominated	
Gold Derby Awards	2016	Best Actress in a Drama Series	House of Cards	Won	
Gold Derby Awards	2017	Best Actress in a Drama Series	House of Cards	Nominated	
Gotham Awards	2005	Best Ensemble Performance	Nine Lives	Nominated	
Independent Spirit Awards	1997	Best Female Lead	Loved	Nominated	
Independent Spirit Awards	2005	Best Supporting Female	Nine Lives	Nominated	
Independent Spirit Awards	2006	Best Female Lead	Sorry, Haters	Nominated	
Locarno International Film Festival	2005	Best Actress	Nine Lives	Won	
Online Film & Television Association	2013	Best Actress in a Drama Series	House of Cards	Nominated	
Online Film & Television Association	2014	Best Actress in a Drama Series	House of Cards	Nominated	
Online Film & Television Association	2015	Best Actress in a Drama Series	House of Cards	Nominated	
Online Film & Television Association	2016	Best Actress in a Drama Series	House of Cards	Nominated	
Online Film & Television Association	2017	Best Actress in a Drama Series	House of Cards	Nominated	
Producers Guild of America Awards	2016	Best Episodic Drama	House of Cards	Nominated	
Satellite Awards	1996	Best Actress – Motion Picture Drama	Moll Flanders	Nominated	
Satellite Awards	2005	Best Actress – Motion Picture Drama	Nine Lives	Nominated	
Satellite Awards	2013	Best Actress – Television Series Drama	House of Cards	Won	
Satellite Awards	2014	Best Actress – Television Series Drama	House of Cards	Nominated	
Satellite Awards	2015	Best Actress – Television Series Drama	House of Cards	Nominated	
Saturn Awards	1987	Best Actress	The Princess Bride	Nominated	
Saturn Awards	1992	Best Supporting Actress	Toys	Nominated	
Saturn Awards	1994	Best Supporting Actress	Forrest Gump	Nominated	
Soap Opera Digest Awards	1986	Outstanding Young Leading Actress on a Daytime Serial	Santa Barbara	Nominated	
Soap Opera Digest Awards	1988	Outstanding Heroine: Daytime	Santa Barbara	Won	
Golden Nymph Awards	2025	Lifetime Achievement Award	Herself	Honored	
