= Reynaldo Villalobos =

American cinematographer and director

- Born: Reynaldo Villalobos II; November 9, 1940 (age 85); Los Angeles, California, U.S.
- Occupations: Cinematographer; director
- Children: Gina Villalobos

Reynaldo Villalobos II (born November 9, 1940) is an American cinematographer and director, noted for his dark and realistic cinematography.

Reynaldo Villalobos is the father of American singer-songwriter Gina Villalobos.

== Filmography ==
=== Cinematographer ===
==== Film ====
Year	Title	Director	Notes
1980	Urban Cowboy	James Bridges	
1980	9 to 5	Colin Higgins	
1982	Personal Best	Robert Towne	Uncredited
1983	Risky Business	Paul Brickman	With Bruce Surtees
1984	Blame It on Rio	Stanley Donen	
1984	Mike's Murder	James Bridges	
1984	Grandview, U.S.A.	Randal Kleiser	
1984	Windy City	Armyan Bernstein	
1986	Desert Bloom	Eugene Corr	
1986	Lucas	David Seltzer	
1986	Band of the Hand	Paul Michael Glaser	
1986	Saving Grace	Robert M. Young	
1988	Punchline	David Seltzer	
1989	Major League	David S. Ward	
1990	Denial	Erin Dignam	
1990	Coupe de Ville	Joe Roth	
1990	Sibling Rivalry	Carl Reiner	
1992	American Me	Edward James Olmos	
1993	A Bronx Tale	Robert De Niro	
1993	Roosters	Robert M. Young	
1994	PCU	Hart Bochner	
1997	Romy and Michele's High School Reunion	David Mirkin	
1997	Loved	Erin Dignam	
1997	Telling Lies in America	Guy Ferland	
1997	An Alan Smithee Film: Burn Hollywood Burn	Arthur Hiller	
1998	Return to Paradise	Joseph Ruben	
2000	Love & Basketball	Gina Prince-Bythewood	
2001	Not Another Teen Movie	Joel Gallen	
2002	Juwanna Mann	Jesse Vaughan	
2002	Welcome to America	Rish Mustaine; John M. Sjogren	With Mark Philip Escobar and Philip C. Pfeiffer
2002	Jack and Marilyn	Edward James Olmos	
2005	Flip the Script	Terrah Bennett Smith	
2007	Bordertown	Gregory Nava	
2007	One Long Night	David Siqueiros	
2009	Like Dandelion Dust	Jon Gunn	
2014	The Redemption of Henry Myers	Clayton Miller	
2014	Big Stone Gap	Adriana Trigiani	
2019	Windows on the World	Michael D. Olmos	
2019	The Devil Has a Name	Edward James Olmos	
2020	Then Came You	Adriana Trigiani	

Short film

Year	Title	Director
2006	On the Brink	Eric Prescott
2014	House of the Righteous	Thomas Torrey
2016	The Lost Pueblo	Tomás Sánchez

==== Television ====
Year	Title	Director	Notes
1982	American Playhouse	Robert M. Young	Segment The Ballad of Gregorio Cortez
1982	Remington Steele	Robert Butler	Episode "Tempered Steele"
1984	Legmen	Roger Young	Episode "Take the Credit and Run"
1986	Alfred Hitchcock Presents	Andrew Mirisch	Episode "Four O'Clock"
1986	L.A. Law	Gregory Hoblit	Episode "L.A. Law"
1987	The Hitchhiker	Thomas Baum	Episode "Made for Each Other"
1988	Midnight Caller	Thomas Carter	Episode "Conversations with the Assassin"
1992	Sinatra	James Steven Sadwith	Miniseries
1998	L.A. Doctors	Gary Fleder	Episode "Pilot"
2004	American Family		Episode "The Wedding"
2008	Breaking Bad	Adam Bernstein; Jim McKay; Tricia Brock; Bronwen Hughes; Tim Hunter	6 episodes
2009	Mental	Guy Ferland; Jesus Trevino; Rod Hardy	3 episodes

TV movies

Year	Title	Director	Notes
1981	Our Family Business	Robert L. Collins	
1981	The Children Nobody Wanted	Richard Michaels	
1981	The Patricia Neal Story	Anthony Harvey	American sequences
1982	Prime Suspect	Noel Black	
1983	One Cooks, the Other Doesn't	Richard Michaels	
1985	Deadly Intentions	Noel Black	With Frank Watts
1986	A Smoky Mountain Christmas	Henry Winkler	
2002	Women vs. Men	Chazz Palminteri	

=== Director ===
TV series

Year	Title	Episode(s)
1987	The Hitchhiker	"Doctor's Orders"
1987	Tour of Duty	"Burn, Baby, Burn"
1987	Tour of Duty	"The Good, the Bad and the Dead"
1987-1989	Wiseguy	"One on One" and "Day Four"
1989	Midnight Caller	"The Execution of John Saringo"
1989	Knightwatch	"Cops" (Part 1 and Part 2)
1989	Unsub	"Daddy Dearest"
1989	CBS Summer Playhouse	"The Heat"
1989	Booker	"All You Gotta Do Is Do It"
1990-1991	DEA	
1994-1995	New York Undercover	"The Friendly Neighborhood Dealer" and "CAT"
1998	L.A. Doctors	"Leap of Faith"
1998-1999	Soldier of Fortune, Inc.	"Spyder's Web"
1998-1999	Soldier of Fortune, Inc.	"Iraq and Roll"
1998-1999	Soldier of Fortune, Inc.	"The Lord is My Shepherd"
1999	Rescue 77	"Mustard Gas, Hold the Mayo"
2000	Sliders	"Dust"
2006	Battlestar Galactica	"Sacrifice"

TV movies

- Conagher (1991)
- Hollywood Confidential (1997)
