= 13th Independent Spirit Awards =

US film awards ceremony in 1998

- Date: March 21, 1998
- Site: Santa Monica, California, U.S.
- Hosted by: John Turturro

Highlights
- Best Film: The Apostle
- Most awards: The Apostle (3)
- Most nominations: The Apostle (7)

The 13th Independent Spirit Awards, honoring the best in independent filmmaking for 1997, were announced on March 21, 1998. It was hosted by John Turturro.

== Nominees and winners ==
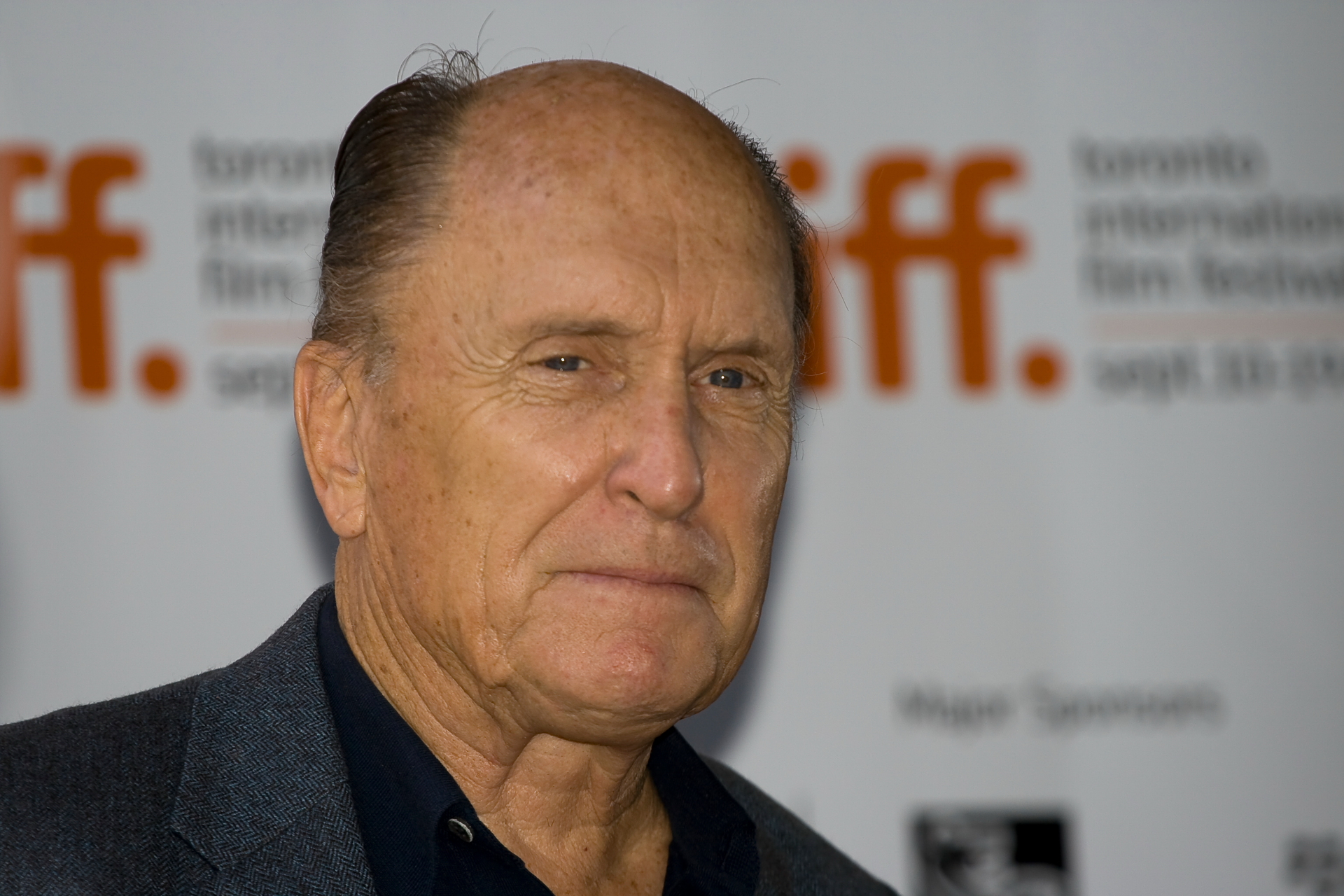
Robert Duvall, Best Male Lead and Best Director winner

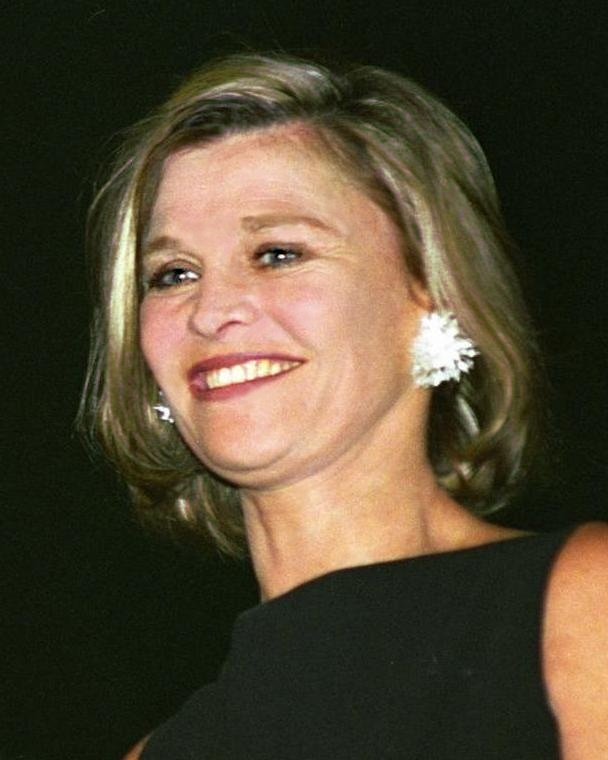
Julie Christie, Best Female Lead winner

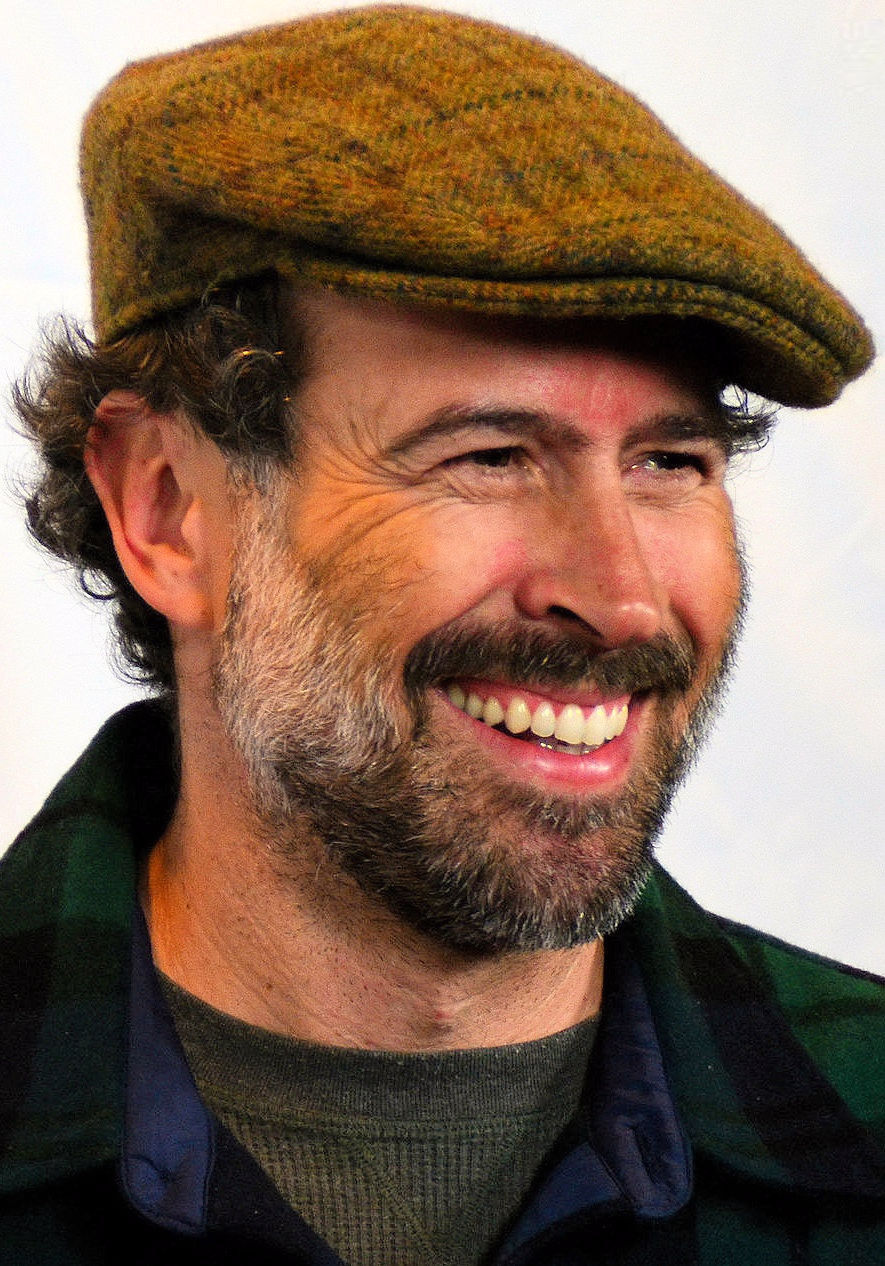
Jason Lee, Best Supporting Male winner

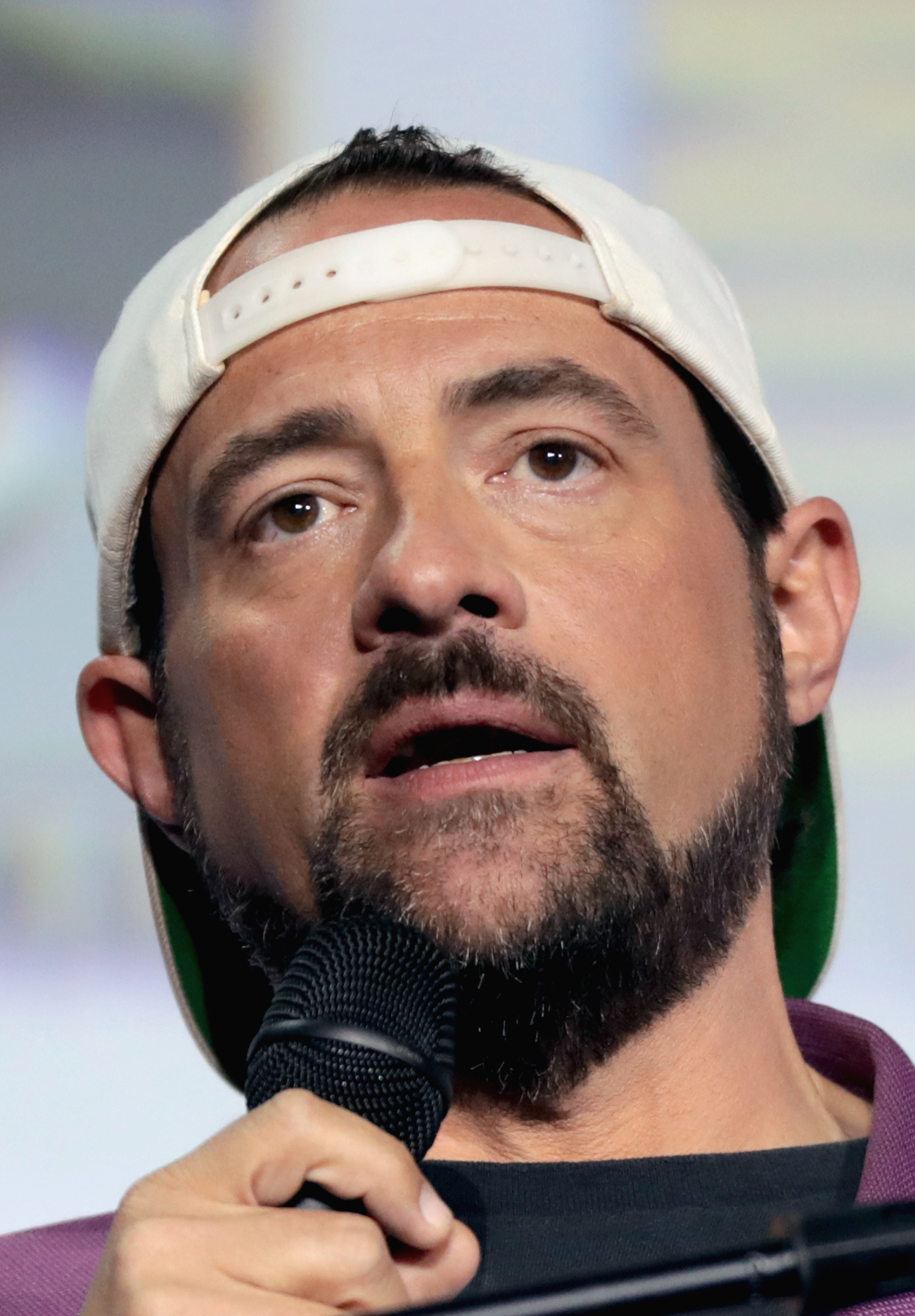
Kevin Smith, Best Screenplay winner

Best Feature	Best Director
The Apostle: Chasing Amy; Loved; Ulee's Gold; Waiting for Guffman	Robert Duvall – The Apostle: Larry Fessenden – Habit; Victor Nuñez – Ulee's Gold; Paul Schrader – Touch; Wim Wenders – The End of Violence
Best Male Lead	Best Female Lead
Robert Duvall – The Apostle: Peter Fonda – Ulee's Gold; Christopher Guest – Waiting for Guffman; Philip Baker Hall – Hard Eight; John Turturro – Box of Moonlight	Julie Christie – Afterglow: Stacy Edwards – In the Company of Men; Alison Folland – All Over Me; Lisa Harrow – Sunday; Robin Wright Penn – Loved
Best Supporting Male	Best Supporting Female
Jason Lee – Chasing Amy: Efrain Figueroa – Star Maps; Samuel L. Jackson – Hard Eight; Ajay Naidu – SubUrbia; Roy Scheider – The Myth of Fingerprints	Debbi Morgan – Eve's Bayou: Farrah Fawcett – The Apostle; Amy Madigan – Loved; Miranda Richardson – The Apostle; Patricia Richardson – Ulee's Gold
Best Screenplay	Best First Screenplay
Chasing Amy – Kevin Smith: The Apostle – Robert Duvall; Touch – Paul Schrader; Ulee's Gold – Victor Nuñez; Waiting for Guffman – Christopher Guest and Eugene Levy	In the Company of Men – Neil LaBute: The Bible and Gun Club – Daniel J. Harris; Critical Care – Steven Schwartz; Hard Eight – Paul Thomas Anderson; Star Maps – Miguel Arteta
Best First Feature	Best Debut Performance
Eve's Bayou: The Bible and Gun Club; Hard Eight - Pault Thomas Anderson; In the Company of Men - Neil LaBute; Star Maps	Aaron Eckhart – In the Company of Men: Tyrone Burton, Eddie Cutanda and Phuong Duong – Squeeze; Lysa Flores – Star Maps; Darling Narita – Bang; Douglas Spain – Star Maps
Best Cinematography	Best International Film
Kama Sutra: A Tale of Love – Declan Quinn: The Bible and Gun Club – Alex Vendler; Habit – Frank G. DeMarco; Hard Eight – Robert Elswit; Sunday – Michael F. Barrow and John Foster	The Sweet Hereafter • Canada: Happy Together • Hong Kong; Mouth to Mouth • Spain; Nenette and Boni • France; Underground • Yugoslavia/France/Germany

=== Films that received multiple nominations ===
Nominations	Film
7	The Apostle
6	Star Maps
5	Hard Eight
5	Ulee's Gold
4	In the Company of Men
4	Loved
3	The Bible and Gun Club
3	Chasing Amy
3	Habit
3	Waiting for Guffman
2	Eve's Bayou
2	Sunday
2	Touch

==== Films that won multiple awards ====
Awards	Film
3	The Apostle
2	Chasing Amy
2	Eve's Bayou
2	In the Company of Men

== Special awards ==
=== Truer Than Fiction Award ===
Fast, Cheap & Out of Control

- Colors Straight Up
- Family Name
- Sick: The Life & Death of Bob Flanagan, Supermasochist
- Soul in the Hole

=== Producers Award ===
Scott Macauley and Robin O'Hara – Habit

- Margot Bridger – Arresting Gena & The Delta
- Lisa Onodera – Picture Bride & Forbidden City U.S.A.
- Richard Raddon – Shooting Lilly & The Making of '...And God Spoke'
- Susan A. Stover – High Art & River of Grass

=== Someone to Watch Award ===
Scott Saunders – The Headhunter's Sister

- Erin Dignam – Loved
- Tim Blake Nelson – Eye of God
