= List of most watched Canadian television broadcasts of 1985 =

The following is a list of most watched Canadian television broadcasts of 1985 (single-network only) according to Nielsen.

== Most watched by week ==
Week of	Program	Network	Viewers (million)	Ref.
January 7	Dallas	CBC	3.64	
January 14	Magnum, P.I.	CTV	2.95	
January 21	Walt Disney	CBC	3.44	
January 28	12th Annual American Music Awards	CTV	4.19	
February 4	Walt Disney	CBC	3.70	
February 11	Unknown			
February 18	Star Trek II: The Wrath of Khan	CTV	3.39	
February 25	27th Annual Grammy Awards	CTV	3.78	
March 4	Night of 100 Stars	CTV	3.19	
March 11	Dallas	CBC	3.15	
March 18	Walt Disney	CBC	3.37	
March 25	57th Academy Awards	CTV	4.32	
April 1	Walt Disney	CBC	3.19	
April 8	1985 Stanley Cup Playoffs (Game 4)	CBC	3.45	
April 15	1985 Stanley Cup Playoffs (Saturday)	CBC	3.45	
April 22	1985 Stanley Cup Playoffs (Saturday)	CBC	2.64	
April 29	Dallas	CBC	3.04	
May 6	Dallas	CBC	2.98	
May 13	Dallas	CBC	4.04	
May 20	Unknown			
May 27	1985 Stanley Cup Finals (Game 5)	CTV	3.37	
June 3	Walt Disney	CBC	2.19	
June 10	Knight Rider	CTV	1.89	
June 17	Walt Disney	CBC	2.07	
June 24	The National	CBC	2.37	
July 1	Eye of the Needle	CTV	2.33	
July 8	Live Aid	CTV	2.40	
July 15	Excalibur	CTV	2.16	
July 22	Princess Daisy (Part 2)	CTV	2.56	
July 29	Unknown			
August 5	The National	CBC	2.18	
August 12	Unknown			
August 19	Unknown			
August 26	Sparkling Cyanide	CTV	2.24	
September 2	A Change of Seasons	CTV	1.99	
September 9	The Blue and the Gray (Part 3)	CTV	2.26	
September 16	Love Child	CTV	2.80	
September 23	The Cosby Show	CTV	4.35	
September 30	The Cosby Show	CTV	4.55	
October 7	1985 American League Championship Series (Game 5)	CTV	4.48	
October 14	The Cosby Show	CTV	5.20	
October 21	Unknown			
October 28	The Cosby Show	CTV	4.83	
November 4	The Cosby Show	CTV	4.99	
November 11	The Cosby Show	CTV	4.37	
November 18	The Cosby Show	CTV	5.21	
November 25	Unknown			
December 2	Anne of Green Gables (Part 2)	CBC	5.84	
December 9	The Cosby Show	CTV	5.66	
December 16	The Cosby Show	CTV	4.48	
December 23	Unknown			
December 30	The Cosby Show	CTV	4.90	
