= Amy Madigan =

American actress (born 1950)

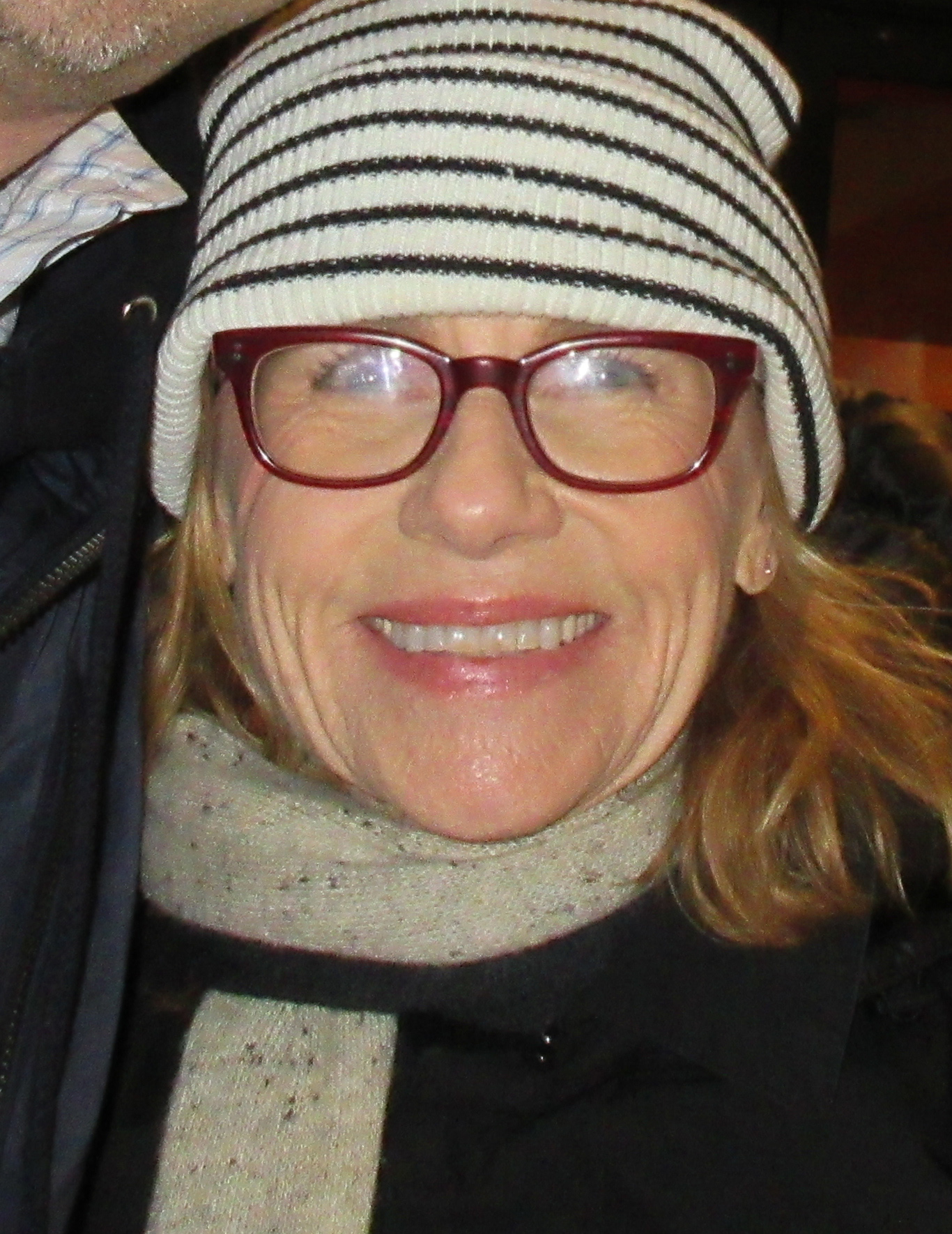
- Madigan in 2018
- Born: September 11, 1950 (age 76); Chicago, Illinois, U.S.
- Education: Marquette University (B.A.)
- Occupations: Actress, singer
- Years active: 1974–present
- Spouse: Ed Harris (m. 1983)
- Children: 1

Amy Marie Madigan (born September 11, 1950) is an American actress and singer. Known for her work on stage and screen, her accolades include an Academy Award, an Actor Award, a Golden Globe Award, and a Critics' Choice Award, in addition to a nomination for a Primetime Emmy Award.

Madigan started her career as a traveling musician, later deciding to pursue an acting career. Her band Jelly released their debut album in 1977. She made her film debut in the drama Love Child (1982), for which she received her first Golden Globe Award nomination. She received a nomination for the Academy Award for Best Supporting Actress for her performance as a woman in a difficult marriage in Twice in a Lifetime (1985). She won in the same category 40 years later for her performance as the villainous Aunt Gladys in Weapons (2025)—the longest gap between two nominations for an actress. Her other film credits include Love Letters (1984), Alamo Bay (1985), Nowhere to Hide (1987), Uncle Buck (1989), Field of Dreams (1989), Female Perversions (1996), Pollock (2000), Gone Baby Gone (2007), and The Hunt (2020).

On television, Madigan portrayed Sarah Weddington in the television film Roe vs. Wade (1989), for which she won the Golden Globe for Best Supporting Actress in a Series, Miniseries or Television Film and was nominated for a Primetime Emmy Award. She took on roles in the HBO series Carnivàle (2003–2005), Grey's Anatomy (2008–2009), and Fringe (2009). On stage, she has acted in the Off-Broadway production of The Lucky Spot (1987), for which she was nominated for the Drama Desk Award for Outstanding Actress in a Play, and a 1992 Broadway production of A Streetcar Named Desire in the role of Stella Kowalski.

== Early life and education ==
Amy Marie Madigan was born September 11, 1950, in Chicago to Dolores (née Hanlon), an administrative assistant and amateur actress who performed in community theatre, and John J. Madigan, a journalist who worked for Newsweek and provided political commentary on programs including Meet the Press and Face the Nation. Her father interviewed a range of political figures from Richard Nixon to Martin Luther King Jr., and hosted his own show with WBBM (AM). She is Catholic and third-generation Irish American. She has two brothers, Jack and Jim.

During high school, Amy Madigan performed in school plays. She attended Marquette University in Milwaukee, Wisconsin, where she earned a B.A. degree in philosophy in 1972. She moved to Los Angeles in 1974, later studying acting at the Lee Strasberg Theatre and Film Institute.

== Career ==
=== 1972-1979: Music career ===
Madigan toured throughout the United States as a vocalist for several rock bands during the 1970s before relocating to Los Angeles. She also performed as a solo singer and pianist in Dallas in the late 1970s and early 1980s. Recounting her career as a singer in the 2015 interview with Susan King, Madigan said: "I had been working in [music] for a very long time. I am not a writer, so I wasn't generating my own personal material. I just felt myself kind of hitting the same brick wall... I miss music every day. It's very visceral and emotional. You can pack something into three minutes, and you can't do that in any other medium." Her band Jelly, released their debut album, A True Story, in 1977. To promote the album, Madigan posed for Playboy magazine in a bathtub of jelly.

=== 1980–1989: Film debut and other roles ===
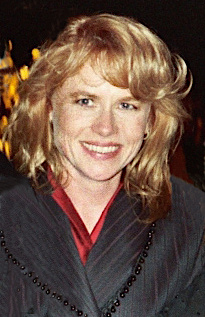
Madigan at the 1989 Emmy Awards

In the 1980s, Madigan transitioned from a singing career to acting, and studied at the Lee Strasberg Theatre and Film Institute. Her first television role was Adele on an episode of Hart to Hart in 1981; she then had role in the television film Crazy Times. The following year, she made her film debut as Terry Jean Moore in Love Child, for which she was nominated for a Golden Globe Award for New Star of the Year – Actress. In 1983, she starred as Alison Ransom in the television film The Day After.

In 1984, she portrayed McCoy in the film Streets of Fire, and had a supporting role as Viola Kelsey in Places in the Heart. In 1985, she starred in the television film The Laundromat, written by Marsha Norman, opposite Carol Burnett. She won a CableACE Award for her performance as Deedee Johnson. She then co-starred as Glory Scheer, with her husband Ed Harris, in Alamo Bay, directed by Louis Malle. Also in 1985, she played Sunny Mackenzie-Sobel, a woman in a difficult marriage, in Twice in a Lifetime. She received Golden Globe and Academy Award nominations.

Madigan made her Off-Broadway debut in 1987, portraying Sue Jack Tiller in The Lucky Spot by Beth Henley, for which she won a Theatre World Award and was nominated for the Drama Desk Award for Outstanding Actress in a Play. In 1988, she was nominated for an Independent Spirit Award for Best Supporting Female for her performance in The Prince of Pennsylvania. That year, she performed in A Lie of the Mind at the Mark Taper Forum. In 1989 she played the wife of Kevin Costner's lead character in Field of Dreams, which was nominated for the Academy Award for Best Picture; and played Chanice Kobolowski, the girlfriend of John Candy's character, in the John Hughes film Uncle Buck. Also in 1989, she won a Golden Globe Award for Best Supporting Actress – Series, Miniseries or Television Film and was nominated for the Primetime Emmy Award for Outstanding Lead Actress in a Miniseries or a Movie for her performance as Sarah Weddington in the television film Roe vs. Wade.

=== 1990–2009: Career fluctuations ===
In 1990, Madigan starred opposite Paula Kelly in Stevie Wants to Play the Blues by Eduardo Machado, for which she won a Drama-Logue Award. In 1991, she starred opposite Olympia Dukakis in the Emmy-nominated television film Lucky Day. She made her Broadway debut in the role of Stella Kowalski in A Streetcar Named Desire in 1992, opposite Jessica Lange and Alec Baldwin, and was nominated for an Outer Critics Circle Award for Outstanding Debut Performance. Madigan next appeared opposite Timothy Hutton in The Dark Half (1993), a film adaptation of the Stephen King novel of the same name, directed by George A. Romero.

In 1996, she and Harris produced and starred in the television film Riders of the Purple Sage. She then starred with Tilda Swinton in Female Perversions. In 1997, she was nominated for an Independent Spirit Award for Best Supporting Female for her performance as Brett Armerson in the film Loved. In 2000, she portrayed Peggy Guggenheim in the film Pollock, starring her husband, which he also directed and produced. In 2002 she had a supporting role as Reggie Fluty, the officer who responded to aid the dying Matthew Shepard in the television film The Laramie Project. In 2003–2005, Madigan had the supporting role of Iris Crowe/Irina, sister of villain Justin Crowe, in HBO's series Carnivále. In 2005, she starred as Lori Lansky in Winter Passing, directed by Adam Rapp. In 2006, she had a supporting role as Patricia Carver, a CIA headquarters analyst, in the Emmy-winning television film The Path to 9/11. In 2007, she played the sister-in-law of Helene (Amy Ryan), Beatrice "Bea" McCready, in the film Gone Baby Gone, directed by Ben Affleck. In 2008, Madigan played Dr. Katharine Wyatt on several episodes of ABC's medical drama series Grey's Anatomy. She then guest-starred on TNT's crime drama series Saving Grace as Gretchen Lagardi.

In a 2015 interview with Madigan for The Los Angeles Times, journalist Susan King said, "Madigan, like so many actresses older than 50, has had difficulties finding meaningful roles." Madigan opined about her career and the lack of roles for actresses her age, saying, "My husband works a lot more than I do... You know what the situation is. The reality is you have to make your peace with it sometimes even when you have a depressive day, which I still have."

=== 2010–present: Later projects and Weapons ===
In 2011, she guest-starred in the final episode of TNT's drama series Memphis Beat. Madigan returned to theater in 2015, directing a stage production of Off the King's Road at the Odyssey Theater in Los Angeles. In 2016, she starred as Halie in the revival of Sam Shepard's play Buried Child for The New Group at the Pershing Square Signature Center in Manhattan, New York. It moved to the West End's Trafalgar Studios in London in November 2016, where Madigan reprised her role.

In 2018, she had a supporting role in the independent drama American Woman opposite Sienna Miller, followed by a supporting role in Scott Cooper's horror film Antlers (2021), playing a school principal in a small Oregon town plagued by a supernatural entity. In 2024, Madigan starred as Judge Motley in the independent drama Bull Street, which premiered as the opening night film at the Sarasota Film Festival in Sarasota, Florida. In a 2025 interview with The New York Times, Madigan told Kyle Buchanan, "Opportunities [as an older actress] are less and you just hope that something finds you so you can find it... I don't take it for granted, because you can go up and then you can go all the way down, as we know."

In 2025, she had a pivotal role in Zach Cregger's horror mystery film Weapons, playing the eccentric and mysterious Gladys, the great-aunt of a young boy whose classmates go missing in his small community. Madigan's performance in Weapons earned her great critical acclaim and awards recognition, including the Actor Award for Outstanding Performance by a Female Actor in a Supporting Role, Critics Choice Award for Best Supporting Actress and New York Film Critics Circle Award for Best Supporting Actress, as well as a nomination for the Golden Globe Award for Best Supporting Actress. On March 15, 2026, she won the Academy Award for Best Supporting Actress; the 40-year gap between this nomination and her previous nomination for Twice in a Lifetime set the record for longest gap between Oscar nominations for an actress.

Madigan will appear in the upcoming Netflix limited series adaptation All the Sinners Bleed, based on the S. A. Cosby novel of the same name, and James Ponsoldt's upcoming psychological thriller film Sponsor.

== Personal life ==
Madigan married actor Ed Harris on November 21, 1983. They have a daughter.

Since 2016, Madigan has served on the board of trustees at Reed College in Portland, Oregon.

Madigan and Harris lost their Malibu home in the Palisades Fire of January 2025.

== Acting credits ==
Key
†	Denotes works that have not yet been released

=== Film ===
Year	Title	Role	Notes	Ref.
1982	Love Child	Terry Jean Moore		
1983	Love Letters	Wendy		
1984	Places in the Heart	Viola Kelsey		
1984	Streets of Fire	McCoy		
1985	Alamo Bay	Glory Scheer		
1985	Twice in a Lifetime	Sunny Mackenzie-Sobel	Nomination – Academy Award for Best Supporting Actress	
1986	Zeisters	Woman at Funeral	Cameo appearance	
1987	Nowhere to Hide	Barbara Cutter		
1988	The Prince of Pennsylvania	Carla Headlee		
1989	Field of Dreams	Annie Kinsella		
1989	Uncle Buck	Chanice Kobolowski		
1993	The Dark Half	Liz Beaumont		
1996	Female Perversions	Maddie Stephens		
1997	Loved	Brett Armerson		
1998	With Friends Like These...	Hannah DiMartino		
2000	Pollock	Peggy Guggenheim		
2002	A Time for Dancing	Jackie Russell		
2004	The Discontents	Beth Walker		
2004	Admissions	Martha Brighton		
2004	In the Land of Milk and Money	Arlyne		
2005	Winter Passing	Lori Lansky		
2007	Gone Baby Gone	Bea McCready		
2007	Doppelgänger	Victor's Mom		
2010	Once Fallen	Rose Ryan	Also executive producer	
2010	Virginia	Roseanna Tipton		
2011	That's What I Am	Principal Evelyn Kelner		
2012	Future Weather	Grandma Greta		
2013	The Lifeguard	Justine London		
2013	Sweetwater	Madame Bovary		
2014	Shirin in Love	Rachel Harson		
2014	Frontera	Olivia McNary		
2015	Grey Lady	Lola		
2016	Sensitivity Training	Nancy Wolfe		
2016	Rules Don't Apply	Mrs. Bransford		
2017	Stuck	Sue		
2017	A Crooked Somebody	Joyce Vaughn		
2018	American Woman	Margaret "Peggy" Callahan		
2019	The Last Full Measure	Donna Burr		
2020	The Hunt	Miranda / "Ma"		
2021	Antlers	Principal Ellen Booth		
2025	Rebuilding	Bess Hadley		
2025	Weapons	Aunt Gladys	Academy Award for Best Supporting Actress	
2027	The Comebacker †		Filming	
TBA	Sponsor †		Post-production	

=== Television ===
Year	Title	Role	Notes	Ref.
1981	Hart to Hart	Adele	Episode: "Slow Boat to Murder"	
1981	Crazy Times	Marilyn	Television film	
1981	CHiPs	Jewel Burnett	Episode: "Finders Keepers"	
1982	The Ambush Murders	Molly Slavin	Television film	
1982	Victims	Chloe Brill	Television film	
1983	The Day After	Alison Ransom	Television film	
1983	Travis McGee	Billy Jean Bailey	Television film	
1984	Eureka Stockade	Sarah Jamieson	Miniseries; 3 episodes	
1985	The Laundromat	Deedee Johnson	Television film	
1988	American Playhouse	Sarah Penn	Episode: "The Revolt of Mother"	
1989	Roe vs. Wade	Sarah Weddington	Television film	
1991	Lucky Day	Kari Campbell	Television film	
1994	And Then There Was One	Roxy Ventola	Television film	
1994	Frasier	Maggie	Voice role; Episode: "Flour Child"	
1994	Crocodile Shoes	Carmel Cantrell	Miniseries; 3 episodes	
1996	Riders of the Purple Sage	Jane Withersteen	Television film; also executive producer	
1998	A Bright Shining Lie	Mary Jane Vann	Television film	
1999	Having Our Say	Amy Hill Hearth	Television film	
2000	In the Name of the People	Connie Murphy	Television film	
2001	Shot in the Heart	Bessie Gilmore	Television film	
2002	The Laramie Project	Officer Reggie Flutty	Television film	
2002	Just a Dream	Cindy Wilder	Television film	
2003–2005	Carnivàle	Iris Crowe	Main role; 22 episodes	
2004	The Ranch	Mary Larkin	Television film	
2006	Murder on Pleasant Drive	Aunt Sherrie Davis	Television film	
2006	The Path to 9/11	Patricia Carver	Miniseries; 2 episodes	
2007	Criminal Minds	Jane Hanratty	Episodes: "No Way Out" & "No Way Out, Part II: The Evilution of Frank"	
2008	Saving Grace	Gretchen Lagardi	Episode: "A Little Hometown Love"	
2008	Living Proof	Fran Visco	Television film	
2008–2009	Grey's Anatomy	Dr. Katharine Wyatt	Recurring role; 9 episodes (seasons 4-6)	
2009	ER	Mary Taggart	Episodes: "T-Minus-6" & "What We Do"	
2010	Law & Order	Emily Ryan	Episode: "Innocence"	
2010–2011	Fringe	Marilyn Dunham	Recurring role; 3 episodes (season 3)	
2011	Memphis Beat	Kate Murphy	Episode: "The Feud"	
2012	The Dust Bowl	Sanora Babb	Episode: "Reaping the Whirlwind"	
2016	Grace and Frankie	Elaine Millstein	Episode: "The Loophole"	
2016	How to Get Away with Murder	Irene Crawley	Episode: "There Are Worse Things Than Murder"	
2018	Ice	Diane Pierce	Recurring role; 5 episodes (season 2)	
2020	Penny Dreadful: City of Angels	Adelaide Finnister	Recurring role; 8 episodes	
TBA	All the Sinners Bleed †	Scarlett Cunningham	Guest role	
TBA	Ascent †	Rachel	Main role	
TBA	The X-Files †	TBA	Guest role	

=== Theater ===
Year	Title	Role	Location	Notes	Ref.
1987	The Lucky Spot	Sue Jack Tiller	New York City Center, Off-Broadway		
1990	Stevie Wants to Play the Blues	Stevie	Los Angeles Theatre Center		
1992	A Streetcar Named Desire	Stella Kowalski	Ethel Barrymore Theatre, Broadway		
2005	Afternoon Tea		Kirk Theatre, Off-Broadway		
2013	The Jacksonian	Susan Perch	Theatre Row, Off-Broadway		
2015	Off the King's Road	—N/a	Odyssey Theater, Los Angeles	Director	
2016	Buried Child	Halie	The New Group, Off-Broadway		
2016–2017	Buried Child	Halie	Trafalgar Studios, West End		
2018	Good for Otto	Evangeline Ryder	The New Group, Off-Broadway		

== Discography ==
=== Albums ===
- 1977, Jelly: A True Story, Asylum Records

Singles

- 1977, "No One Like My Baby"
- 1977, "I Want You To Dance"

== Awards and nominations ==
Institution	Year	Award	Nominated work	Result	Ref.
AACTA International Awards	2026	Best Supporting Actress	Weapons	Won	
AARP Movies for Grownups Awards	2026	Best Supporting Actress	Weapons	Nominated	
Academy Awards	1986	Best Supporting Actress	Twice in a Lifetime	Nominated	
Academy Awards	2026	Best Supporting Actress	Weapons	Won	
Actor Awards	2026	Outstanding Performance by a Female Actor in a Supporting Role	Weapons	Won	
Alliance of Women Film Journalists	2025	Best Supporting Actress	Weapons	Nominated	
Astra Film Awards	2026	Best Supporting Actress - Drama	Weapons	Won	
Atlanta Film Critics Circle	2025	Best Supporting Actress	Weapons	Won	
Austin Film Critics Association	2025	Best Supporting Actress	Weapons	Won	
Boston Society of Film Critics	2025	Best Supporting Actress	Weapons	Won	
Boston Online Film Critics Association	2025	Best Supporting Actress	Weapons	Won	
CableACE Awards	1985	Best Actress in a Theatrical or Dramatic Special	The Laundromat	Won	
CableACE Awards	1995	Best Actress in a Movie or Miniseries	And Then There Was One	Won	
Chicago Film Critics Association	1989	Best Supporting Actress	Field of Dreams	Nominated	
Chicago Film Critics Association	2025	Best Supporting Actress	Weapons	Nominated	
Chicago Indie Critics	2026	Best Supporting Actress	Weapons	Won	
CinEuphoria Awards	2026	Best Supporting Actress - International Competition	Weapons	Nominated	
Columbus Film Critics Association	2026	Best Supporting Performance	Weapons	Nominated	
Critics Association Of Central Florida	2026	Best Supporting Actress	Weapons	Won	
Critics' Choice Awards	2008	Best Acting Ensemble	Gone Baby Gone	Nominated	
Critics' Choice Awards	2026	Best Supporting Actress	Weapons	Won	
Critics' Choice Super Awards	2026	Best Actress in a Horror Movie	Weapons	Nominated	
Critics' Choice Super Awards	2026	Best Villain in a Movie	Weapons	Won	
Dallas–Fort Worth Film Critics Association	2025	Best Supporting Actress	Weapons	Runner-up	
Denver Film Critics Society	2026	Best Supporting Actress	Weapons	Won	
DiscussingFilm Creative Association's Global Film Critics Awards	2026	Best Supporting Actress	Weapons	Won	
Dorian Awards	2026	Supporting Film Performance of the Year	Weapons	Won	
Drama Desk Awards	1987	Outstanding Actress in a Play	The Lucky Spot	Nominated	
Drama-Logue Awards	1990	Best Actress	Stevie Wants to Play the Blues	Won	
Fangoria Chainsaw Awards	1994	Best Actress	The Dark Half	Nominated	
Film Critics Association UK	2025	Best Supporting Actress	Weapons	Nominated	
Florida Film Critics Circle	2025	Best Supporting Actress	Weapons	Nominated	
Georgia Film Critics Association	2025	Best Supporting Actress	Weapons	Won	
Gold Derby Awards	2026	Best Supporting Actress	Weapons	Won	
Golden Globe Awards	1983	New Star of the Year – Actress	Love Child	Nominated	
Golden Globe Awards	1985	Best Supporting Actress – Motion Picture	Twice in a Lifetime	Nominated	
Golden Globe Awards	1990	Best Supporting Actress – Series, Miniseries or Television Film	Roe vs. Wade	Won	
Golden Globe Awards	2026	Best Supporting Actress – Motion Picture	Weapons	Nominated	
Greater Western New York Film Critics Association	2026	Best Supporting Actress	Weapons	Nominated	
Hawaii Film Critics Society	2026	Best Supporting Actress	Weapons	Won	
Houston Film Critics Society	2026	Best Supporting Actress	Weapons	Won	
Independent Spirit Awards	1989	Best Supporting Female	The Prince of Pennsylvania	Nominated	
Independent Spirit Awards	1998	Best Supporting Female	Loved	Nominated	
Indiana Film Journalists Association	2025	Best Supporting Performance	Weapons	Runner-up	
International Cinephile Society	2026	Best Supporting Actress	Weapons	Nominated	
Kansas City Film Critics Circle	2025	Best Supporting Actress	Weapons	Won	
Las Vegas Film Critics Society	2025	Best Supporting Actress	Weapons	Won	
Latino Entertainment Journalists Association	2026	Best Supporting Actress	Weapons	Nominated	
London Film Critics' Circle	2026	Supporting Actress of the Year	Weapons	Won	
Make-Up Artists & Hair Stylists Guild	2026	Distinguished Artisan Award	—N/a	Honored	
Minnesota Film Critics Association	2026	Best Supporting Actress	Weapons	Won	
Music City Film Critics' Association	2026	Best Supporting Actress	Weapons	Won	
New Jersey Film Critics Circle	2025	Best Supporting Actress	Weapons	Won	
New Mexico Film Critics	2026	Best Supporting Actress	Weapons	Won	
New York Film Critics Circle	2025	Best Supporting Actress	Weapons	Won	
New York Film Critics Online	2025	Best Supporting Actress	Weapons	Runner-up	
North Carolina Film Critics Association	2026	Best Supporting Actress	Weapons	Won	
North Dakota Film Society	2026	Best Supporting Actress	Weapons	Won	
North Texas Film Critics Association	2025	Best Supporting Actress	Weapons	Won	
Oklahoma Film Critics Circle	2026	Best Supporting Actress	Weapons	Won	
Online Association of Female Film Critics	2025	Best Supporting Female	Weapons	Runner-up (Note: Tied with Inga Ibsdotter Lilleaas for Sentimental Value.)	
Online Film Critics Society	2026	Best Supporting Actress	Weapons	Won	
Online Film & Television Association	2002	Best Supporting Actress in a Motion Picture or Miniseries	The Laramie Project	Nominated	
Online Film & Television Association	2026	Best Supporting Actress	Weapons	Won	
Outer Critics Circle Awards	1992	Outstanding Debut Performance	A Streetcar Named Desire	Nominated	
Phoenix Critics Circle	2025	Best Actress in a Supporting Role	Weapons	Won	
Pittsburgh Film Critics Association	2026	Best Supporting Actor	Weapons	Won	
Portland Critics Association	2025	Best Supporting Performance	Weapons	Won (Note: Shared with Delroy Lindo and Wunmi Mosaku for Sinners.)	
Primetime Emmy Awards	1989	Outstanding Lead Actress in a Miniseries or a Movie	Roe vs. Wade	Nominated	
Puerto Rico Critics Association	2026	Best Supporting Actress	Weapons	Won	
San Diego Film Critics Society	2025	Best Supporting Actress	Weapons	Won	
San Diego Film Critics Society	2025	Best Ensemble	Weapons	Nominated	
San Francisco Bay Area Film Critics Circle	2025	Best Supporting Actress	Weapons	Won	
Santa Barbara International Film Festival	2026	Virtuosos Award	Weapons	Honored	
Satellite Awards	1999	Best Supporting Actress – Series, Miniseries or Television Film	A Bright Shining Lie	Nominated	
Satellite Awards	2003	Best Supporting Actress – Series, Miniseries or Television Film	Just a Dream	Nominated	
Satellite Awards	2004	Best Actress – Television Series Drama	Carnivàle	Nominated	
Satellite Awards	2026	Best Actress in a Supporting Role	Weapons	Nominated	
Saturn Awards	2026	Best Supporting Actress in Film	Weapons	Nominated	
Screen Awards	2025	Best Supporting Performance by an Actress – Film	Weapons	Nominated	
Seattle Film Critics Society	2025	Best Actress in a Supporting Role	Weapons	Nominated	
Seattle Film Critics Society	2025	Villain of the Year	Weapons	Won	
Sitges Film Festival	1984	Best Actress	Streets of Fire	Won	
Southeastern Film Critics Association	2025	Best Supporting Actress	Weapons	Won	
St. Louis Film Critics Association	2025	Best Supporting Actress	Weapons	Won	
Theatre World Award	1987	Outstanding Debut Performance	The Lucky Spot	Won	
Toronto Film Critics Association	2025	Outstanding Supporting Performance	Weapons	Runner-up (Note: Shared with Jacob Elordi for Frankenstein, Sean Penn for One Battle After Another and Stellan Skarsgård for Sentimental Value.)	
Utah Film Critics Association	2026	Best Supporting Performance – Female	Weapons	Won	
Utah Film Critics Association	2026	Vice/Martin Award for Performance in a Science-Fiction, Fantasy, or Horror Film	Weapons	Won (Note: Tied with Alfie Williams for 28 Years Later.)	
Vancouver Film Critics Circle	2026	Best Supporting Actress	Weapons	Won	
Washington D.C. Area Film Critics Association	2025	Best Supporting Actress	Weapons	Nominated	

== See also ==
- List of actors with Academy Award nominations
- List of actors with more than one Academy Award nomination in the acting categories
- List of oldest and youngest Academy Award winners and nominees — Oldest winners for Best Supporting Actress
- List of Academy Award records
- List of Golden Globe winners
