= Loved (film) =

1997 film directed by Erin Dignam

- Directed by: Erin Dignam
- Written by: Erin Dignam
- Produced by: Philippe Calande; Sean Penn
- Starring: Robin Wright Penn; William Hurt; Amy Madigan; Anthony Lucero; Paul Dooley; Lucinda Jenney; Joanna Cassidy
- Cinematography: Reynaldo Villalobos
- Production companies: Clyde Is Hungry Films; Crosslight; Loved Productions; MDP Worldwide Entertainment; Palisades Pictures
- Release date: April 1997 (LAFF)
- Running time: 109 minutes
- Country: United States
- Language: English

Loved is a 1997 psychological drama film directed by Erin Dignam and starring Robin Wright Penn and William Hurt.

== Plot ==
Hedda Amerson was once involved in an abusive relationship with her ex-boyfriend, whose abuse impacted her once-promising career in swimming. Since Hedda left him, he has driven three women to attempt suicide, with the last one succeeding. Hedda is subpoenaed to testify on his abusive behavior in court, but she is reluctant to go through with it. District attorney K.D. Dietrickson is assigned to the case.

== Cast ==
- Robin Wright Penn as Hedda Amerson
- William Hurt as K.D. Dietrickson
- Amy Madigan as Brett Amerson
- Anthony Lucero as The Defendant
- Paul Dooley as Leo Amerson
- Lucinda Jenney as Kate Amerson
- Joanna Cassidy as Elenore Amerson
- Sean Penn as Michael

== Production ==
The film was the second collaboration between Wright and Dignam, who first worked together on Denial. Loved was filmed from October to December 1995.

== Release ==
Loved premiered at the LA Film Festival in April 1997. It also screened at the Seattle International Film Festival and the Santa Barbara International Film Festival.

== Reception ==
Ken Eisner of Variety commended Wright’s performance and noted "Erin Dignam takes a refreshingly non-sensationalistic approach to volatile material", but said "in trying to get to the psychological bottom of the ways women enable male violence, pic starts down a difficult path but never quite gets where it's headed." Eisner said the film’s "aquatic symbolism is one of the stronger, and more subtle, undercurrents", Dignam "deserves kudos for eschewing standard entertainment values, and Wright Penn conveys aspects of femaleness (at least the late-20th-century, all-American variety) that are rarely given screen time. But 'Loved' isn’t quite as profound or polished as it needs to be to win over the unconvinced."

Radio Times rated it one star, saying, "No doubt all the people involved in this project had their hearts and best intentions in the right place, but this drama ultimately fumbles the sensitive subject of domestic violence."

At the Seattle International Film Festival, Wright won an Audience Award for Best Actress. She was also nominated for Best Female Lead at the Independent Spirit Awards.

== See also ==
- List of American films of 1997
- List of drama films
- List of thriller films of the 1990s
