= Jumpin' at the Boneyard =

- Theatrical release poster
- Directed by: Jeff Stanzler
- Screenplay by: Jeff Stanzler
- Produced by: Lloyd Steven Goldfine; Nina R. Sadowsky
- Starring: Tim Roth; Alexis Arquette; Danitra Vance
- Cinematography: Lloyd Steven Goldfine
- Edited by: Christopher Tellefsen
- Music by: Steve Postell
- Production company: 20th Century Fox
- Distributed by: 20th Century Fox
- Release date: September 18, 1992
- Running time: 107 minutes
- Country: United States
- Language: English
- Box office: $15,706

Jumpin' at the Boneyard is a 1992 American drama film written and directed by Jeff Stanzler. The film stars Tim Roth, Alexis Arquette, Danitra Vance and Samuel L. Jackson. The film was released on September 18, 1992, by 20th Century Fox.

== Plot ==
Manny (Tim Roth) is a solitary man forced to deal with his painful past when his younger addicted brother Dan (Alexis Arquette) storms in to steal his money, in a futile attempt to buy drugs. After an aggressive and hostile discussion, they slowly reconcile, as circumstances obliged both brothers to walk by their childhood neighborhood, reminding them how happy they were, before the challenges and difficulties of adult life separated them. In a painful road of memories, desolation and reconciliation, both brothers rediscover their mutual love for each other, as Manny tries to inspire Dan to stay clean and earn a living decently. In an attempt to make Dan visit their mother, and show her his love, desire to change, and apologize for all his past wrongdoings, Manny employs his best efforts to encourage his brother to arrange his life, quit drugs, and find a decent job. Nonetheless, things seems to always go wrong for the brothers, as Manny's sometimes hard, but always good intentions toward Dan goes wrong again, and a fatality once more struck their lives, reminding both how brutal and hazardous life can be.

== Cast ==
- Tim Roth as Manny
- Alexis Arquette as Dan
- Danitra Vance as Jeanette
- Samuel L. Jackson as Mr. Simpson
- Elizabeth Bracco as Cathy
- Kevin Corrigan as Morty
- Luis Guzmán as Taxi Driver
- Jeffrey Wright as Derek
