= Land (2021 film) =

2021 drama film

- Theatrical release poster
- Directed by: Robin Wright
- Written by: Jesse Chatham; Erin Dignam
- Produced by: Allyn Stewart; Lora Kennedy; Peter Saraf; Leah Holzer
- Starring: Robin Wright; Demián Bichir
- Cinematography: Bobby Bukowski
- Edited by: Anne McCabe; Mikkel E.G. Nielsen
- Music by: Ben Sollee; Time for Three
- Production companies: Cinetic Media; Nomadic Pictures; HanWay Films; Flashlight Films; Big Beach
- Distributed by: Focus Features (United States); Universal Pictures (International)
- Release dates: January 31, 2021 (Sundance); February 12, 2021 (United States); June 4, 2021 (United Kingdom)
- Running time: 89 minutes
- Countries: United States; United Kingdom; Canada
- Language: English
- Box office: $3.2 million

Land is a 2021 psychological drama film directed by Robin Wright in her feature directorial debut, from a screenplay by Jesse Chatham and Erin Dignam. It stars Wright, Demián Bichir and Kim Dickens. The film premiered at the 2021 Sundance Film Festival on January 31, and was released in the United States on February 12, 2021, by Focus Features. It received generally positive reviews from critics.

== Plot ==
After a traumatic experience, Edee Holzer tries therapy, revealing to her therapist that she tries to avoid people. She leaves the city and moves to Wyoming where she purchases a small, remote cabin with land and resolves to live in solitude without any modern conveniences connecting her to the outside world, including telephones or cars.

Initially, Edee struggles with basic provisions, including chopping firewood and fishing. When a black bear enters her cabin, eating her food, and destroying most of the rest of her supplies while she hides in her outhouse, she reaches her breaking point. Without a fire for heat or food to eat, she tries to hunt but cannot bring herself to shoot a deer she has in her sights. Overwhelmed, she attempts to take her life by shooting herself with the hunting rifle, stopping short when she remembers her sister Emma pleading she not hurt herself.

During a violent snowstorm, the metal roof of her cabin becomes somewhat dislodged by the wind, making loud noises. She leaves the cabin to attempt repairs and is injured, but manages to get back inside. Local hunter Miguel and his nurse friend Alawa rescue her and help her recover. As she refuses to leave, Miguel remains to look after Edee by preparing her food, replenishing her supply of firewood, and restocking the rest of her cabin.

Edee thanks Miguel for his kindness in helping her, but explains that she came to her cabin to be alone and wants to keep it that way. He understands and offers to help equip her with better survival skills, so she can have the life of solitude that she wants. He shows her how to trap in the winter and hunt in the fall to provide herself with food. Over time they develop a friendship as Miguel continues to join her to hunt, harvest crops, and explore her land.

Miguel shares that his wife and daughter died in a car accident eight years prior, while Edee simply reveals that she used to have a family. He later remarks that if she does not want to talk about her past, she ought to consider what she wants her future to be like. Edee suspects Miguel searched her history on the internet, although he does not even know her last name, so points out it is impossible.

Miguel asks Edee to watch his dog while he goes away for a while. While he is gone, Edee retrieves a collection of old photos revealing she was married with a son, and the father and son she saw fishing earlier on had been an apparition of her family. Months pass and Miguel has not returned, so Edee packs her belongings and ventures off of her land for the first time since her arrival to find him. She makes her way into town on foot and eventually finds Alawa working at the local hospital.

Alawa takes her to see Miguel, who is bedridden and dying from throat cancer. On his deathbed, he confesses that he was driving the night his wife and daughter were killed and the accident happened because he was intoxicated. Edee responds that her husband Adam and son Drew were killed in a random shooting in a concert hall. She thanks him for helping her heal and the life he gave back to her.

Departing with his phone that he gave her, she calls her sister Emma for the first time since arriving in Wyoming.

== Cast ==
- Robin Wright as Edee Holzer
- Demián Bichir as Miguel
- Kim Dickens as Emma Holzer
- Brad Leland as Colt
- Sarah Dawn Pledge as Alawa and nurse
- Warren Christie as Adam
- Finlay Wojtak-Hissong as Drew

== Production ==
In April 2019, it was announced Robin Wright would star in and direct the film, from a screenplay by Jesse Chatham and Erin Dignam. In October 2019, Demián Bichir and Kim Dickens joined the cast of the film, with Focus Features distributing. Jessica Lange was set to star in the lead role but dropped out due to scheduling conflicts.

Principal photography took place over 29 days in October 2019 in the Rockies west of Calgary in Alberta, Canada. The great changes of weather in those parts meant that the four seasons of the two years of the screenplay's duration could be filmed in just one month.

Edee's cabin was located on Moose Mountain, and the Elbow River in the Bragg Creek area is featured in many scenes. The town scenes were filmed in Didsbury, Alberta, at the Didsbury District Health Services (hospital), on 19th Avenue (JD's Restaurant) and 20th Avenue.

== Release ==
The film premiered at the 2021 Sundance Film Festival on January 31, 2021. It was theatrically released in the United States on February 12, 2021. It was released on video on demand on March 5, 2021.

=== Box office ===
Land grossed $2.5 million in the United States and Canada, and $585,207 in other territories, for a total gross of $3.1 million.

Land opened alongside Judas and the Black Messiah and grossed $899,010 from 1,231 theaters in its opening weekend ($1.1 million over the four-day frame), finishing fifth at the box office. In its second weekend the film dropped 44% to $500,010.

=== Critical response ===
On Rotten Tomatoes, the film has an approval rating of 69% based on 183 reviews, with an average rating of 6.5/10. The website's critics consensus reads, "Land's lovely vistas can't compensate for a hollowness at its center." On Metacritic, it has a weighted average score of 61 out of 100 based on 32 critics, indicating "generally favorable" reviews. Audiences polled by CinemaScore gave the film an average grade of "B+" on an A+ to F scale.
