= Love Letters (1983 film) =

1983 film by Amy Holden Jones

- Theatrical release poster
- Directed by: Amy Holden Jones
- Written by: Amy Holden Jones
- Produced by: Roger Corman
- Starring: Jamie Lee Curtis; James Keach; Amy Madigan; Matt Clark; Bud Cort
- Cinematography: Alec Hirschfeld
- Edited by: Wendy Greene Bricmont
- Music by: Ralph Jones
- Production company: New World Pictures
- Distributed by: New World Pictures
- Release dates: April 5, 1983 (USA Film Festival); January 27, 1984 (United States)
- Running time: 88 minutes
- Country: United States
- Language: English
- Budget: $600,000 or $500,000
- Box office: $5,269,990

Love Letters is a 1983 American romantic drama film starring Jamie Lee Curtis and James Keach. The film is written and directed by Amy Holden Jones, whom Roger Corman agreed to finance following her success with The Slumber Party Massacre (1982).

== Plot ==
Anna Winter is a young woman who discovers her mother had an affair with a married man for 15 years, so she starts her own affair with a married man.

Anna works for a Los Angeles public radio station. She often must care for her alcoholic father and comply with his many demands. When she finds love letters, revealing her mother's longtime involvement with someone else, Anna develops a romantic notion of the idea as something suitable for herself.

She meets a photographer, Oliver Andrews, who is happily married and a father. Their physical attraction is immediate and they begin a torrid affair, but Oliver cautions her from the start that he has no intention of leaving his family. Anna has no objection, enjoying the sex and intimacy for the time being, until feelings develop and she begins to desire a permanent relationship, intruding on Oliver's privacy in the process, with unhappy consequences for all. In the end she finally meets the man her mother had an affair with and she decides to take a job offer at a radio station in San Francisco to give herself a fresh start in life.

== Cast ==
- Jamie Lee Curtis as Anna Winter
- James Keach as Oliver Andrews
- Bonnie Bartlett as Maggie Winter
- Matt Clark as Chuck Winter
- Amy Madigan as Wendy
- Brian Wood as Frank
- Phil Coccioletti as Ralph Glass
- Larry Cedar as Jake
- Rance Howard as Joseph Chesley
- Jeff Doucette as Hippy
- Sally Kirkland as Sally
- Lyman Ward as Morgan Crawford
- Bud Cort as Danny De Fronso

== Production ==
Amy Holden Jones had just made her feature film debut as director with Slumber Party Massacre and wanted to follow it up with something non-horror. She and her husband had written love letters to each other several years previously when living on different coasts; she rediscovered them and wondered what would happen if their daughter came across the love letters. At the same time Jones saw Shoot the Moon about a man who has an affair and thought that while the story of an affair told from the point of view of the unfaithful married man had been done many times, she had never seen the story from the point of view of the girlfriend to the married man. Jones:

I put that together with the love letters and thought it would be interesting if someone came upon the love letters and realized that their parents had had an extramarital affair, if the love letters were not in fact between her mother and father, as ours were, but between the mother and a lover. In other words, what would happen if you were confronted with an understanding of a time period in your parents' life which you never really understand -- none of us have a real idea of what our parents were like in their twenties. How would that affect your life? And I thought it would be interesting if that then thrust her into an affair with a married man, trying to replicate what she saw her mother had. Basically, it was designed to be a movie about what happens to the woman outside of the marriage, who is usually, in fiction, painted as a terrible villain and often is kind of a victim who gets left in the end.

Jones said she was inspired to do flashbacks by the screenplays of Harold Pinter.

Her first choice for the lead was Meg Tilly but her agent was demanding more money than Corman was willing to pay. Jamie Lee Curtis agreed to play the role for only $25,000 despite several nude scenes as it gave her a chance to break away from the horror films she had been mostly making up until that stage of her career. Curtis said she "had to fight to get" the role. "They didn't think I could pull off a sweet young thing... I think they thought I was a little too wordly, too sophisticated, too tough."

The film was financed by Roger Corman who insisted on the inclusion of some nudity. Jones:

He wants either sex, violence or humor. He actually told me that lovemaking wasn't so much required as nudity. And he didn't mind if she could just be lounging around the house nude, but there had to be nudity. He had to have some way to sell the thing. It's actually the one thing that troubles me about it. I find some of the nudity really gratuitous. But it was the price we paid to get it made.

Filmink magazine argued Corman was attracted to the story because "the film feels influenced by Ingmar Bergman, with its simple shots, and educated and cultured characters... who are trying to deal with emotional issues on a rational level."

=== Shooting ===
It was filmed at the Los Angeles Venice Canals in the house located at 412 Carroll Canal Ct. Venice, CA. The production studio of Los Angeles Pacifica station KPFK-FM stood in for the public radio station's control room.

It was shot in the summer of 1982 over twenty days. Curtis made the film before Trading Places, but that movie came out in cinemas before Love Letters.
