= Jeff Stanzler =

American screenwriter and director

Jeff Stanzler is an American screenwriter and director. He wrote and directed the 1992 film Jumpin' at the Boneyard along with the 2005 psychological thriller, Sorry, Haters, an "official selection" in both the Toronto International and American Film Institute film festivals. He is currently working on a documentary about politics in West Africa. He's married to Annouchka Yameogo-Stanzler.

== Selected filmography ==
- Jumpin' at the Boneyard (1992)
- Sorry, Haters (2005)
