= Sorry, Haters =

- Promotional movie poster
- Directed by: Jeff Stanzler
- Written by: Jeff Stanzler
- Produced by: Jake Abraham; Karen Jaroneski; Jeff Stanzler; Gary Winick
- Starring: Robin Wright Penn; Abdellatif Kechiche; Élodie Bouchez; Sandra Oh
- Cinematography: Mauricio Rubinstein
- Edited by: Annette Davey; Susan Graef
- Music by: Raz Mesinai
- Production companies: IFC Productions; InDigEnt
- Distributed by: IFC Films
- Release dates: September 10, 2005 (TIFF); March 1, 2006 (United States)
- Running time: 83 minutes
- Country: United States
- Language: English
- Box office: $7,129

Sorry, Haters is a 2005 drama film written and directed by Jeff Stanzler, starring Robin Wright, Abdellatif Kechiche, Élodie Bouchez and Sandra Oh. Distributed by IFC Films, the film premiered at the 2005 Toronto International Film Festival and received a limited release in North America on March 1, 2006. Sorry, Haters was released on DVD on August 8, 2006.

== Plot ==
In post-9/11 New York City, Syrian taxicab driver Ashade encounters a strange fare in Phoebe. Phoebe works for a network called Q-Dog, where she produces an MTV Cribs-style reality program titled Sorry, Haters. Although Phoebe engages in small talk with Ashade, it is clear that the woman is in an anxious state as she instructs him to drive to suburban New Jersey, placating his reservations with cash. In New Jersey, Phoebe has the cab stop outside a home where she can observe her ex-husband, their child and their house. According to Phoebe, her husband divorced her and re-married, obtaining the house and custody of their kid in the process. Before leaving, Phoebe vandalizes her ex-husband's car.

On the drive back to New York, Phoebe imposes a friendship on Ashade. She learns Ashade, who earned a Ph.D. in chemistry before emigrating to the U.S., has legal problems. Ashade's brother, a Canadian citizen for 10 years, was stopped by U.S. officials on his way through LaGuardia Airport and is now a prisoner at Guantánamo. Legal appeals have failed, though Ashade maintains his brother is innocent. In the meantime, Ashade must financially support his French-Canadian sister-in-law, Eloise, who is in the country illegally. Phoebe tells Ashade that she would like to help with his situation, offering to find a high-powered lawyer to assist him.

However, Phoebe's attempt to help Ashade gradually reveals a dangerous side to her, causing Ashade to flee their brief friendship. Phoebe retaliates in spite, turning Ashade's life upside-down. In order to put his life back together, Ashade must seek out Phoebe and enlist her help. In doing so, he learns about and falls prey to her dark secret.

== Cast ==
- Robin Wright as Phoebe Torrence
- Abdelattif Kechiche as Ashade Mouhana
- Élodie Bouchez as Eloise
- Aasif Mandvi as Hassan
- Sandra Oh as Phyllis Magintyre
- Fred Durst as Evan Jealous
- Josh Hamilton as man (uncredited)
- Sebastian Roché as Mick Sutcliffe (uncredited)

== Release ==
Sorry, Haters premiered at the Toronto International Film Festival on September 10, 2005. It also screened at AFI Fest on November 7, 2005.

The film was released on DVD on August 8, 2006. Among its extra features, the DVD includes a roundtable discussion titled "No Apologies" from the Independent Film Channel. The discussion is moderated by actor Tim Robbins and features Mary-Louise Parker, filmmaker Julian Schnabel, and film writers Paul Thompson and Lisa Hintelman. In the discussion, the participants debate the meaning of Sorry, Haters and share their reactions.

== Reception ==
On Rotten Tomatoes, Sorry, Haters has an approval rating of 37% based on 38 reviews. The critics consensus reads, "Robin Wright Penn and Abdel Kechiche's powerful performances aren't enough to keep the increasingly unbalanced Sorry, Haters from tottering completely off its axis."

Many critics found the film's third act confounding. In a review for AllMovie, Derek Armstrong praised the performances but wrote, "Stanzler emerges as no better than a deluded provocateur, not the brave pusher of hot buttons he wanted to be. It's a shame, because a creepy first half sets an excellent tone, asking questions that seem like they'll have discomfiting answers. But as it spirals off into ridiculousness, the film doesn't merely owe its audience those answers -- Sorry, Haters owes them an apology, indeed."

Roger Ebert gave the film three out of four stars based solely on Robin Wright's performance. He wrote, "To see great work is a reason to see an imperfect movie, and to observe how the movie loses its way may be useful even if it's frustrating. My inclination was to give the film a negative star rating, but that would mean recommending you not see this performance by Penn, and that I am unwilling to do."

Critics also found the film's messaging muddled. Maitland McDonagh of TV Guide wrote, "Stanzler's ideas about the psychic legacy of 9/11 are so confused—Phoebe's craziness seems to have something to do with soul-eroding consumerism, media-made self-loathing and the empowering thrill of disaster—that by the time he unveils the final plot twist, his film has lost every shred of credibility."

=== Accolades ===
In 2007, Sorry, Haters was nominated for two Independent Spirit Awards for Best Screenplay and Best Female Lead. Wright won a Chlotrudis Award for Best Actress.
