= Erin Dignam =

American film director (born 1955)

- Country (sports): United States
- Born: July 20, 1955 (age 70) California, U.S.

Singles

Grand Slam singles results
- French Open: Q1 (1977, 1978)
- Wimbledon: 1R (1977)
- US Open: Q1 (1977)

Doubles

Grand Slam doubles results
- Wimbledon: 1R (1977)

Erin Dignam (born July 20, 1955) is an American film director, screenwriter and former professional tennis player.

A native of California, Dignam qualified for the singles main draw of the 1977 Wimbledon Championships.

Dignam directed and wrote the films Denial (1990) and Loved (1997), both starring actress Robin Wright. The 2021 film Land, which is Wright's directorial debut, is from a screenplay co-written by Dignam. She has also written the screenplay for the films The Yellow Handkerchief (2008) and Submergence (2017).
