= Nine Lives (2005 film) =

- Theatrical release poster
- Directed by: Rodrigo García
- Written by: Rodrigo García
- Produced by: Julie Lynn
- Starring: Sissy Spacek; Glenn Close; Holly Hunter; Lisa Gay Hamilton; Kathy Baker; Amanda Seyfried; Amy Brenneman; Robin Wright Penn; Aidan Quinn; K Callan; Dakota Fanning; Ian McShane; Mary Kay Place; Molly Parker; Sydney Tamiia Poitier; Elpidia Carrillo; Jason Isaacs; Miguel Sandoval; Joe Mantegna
- Cinematography: Xavier Pérez Grobet
- Edited by: Andrea Folprecht
- Music by: Ed Shearmur
- Distributed by: Magnolia Pictures
- Release date: October 14, 2005
- Running time: 115 minutes
- Country: United States
- Language: English
- Budget: $500,000
- Box office: $1.5 million

Nine Lives is a 2005 American drama film written and directed by Rodrigo García. The screenplay, an example of hyperlink cinema, relates nine short, loosely intertwined tales with nine different women at their cores. Their themes include parent-child relationships, fractured love, adultery, illness, and death. Similar to García's previous work, Things You Can Tell Just by Looking at Her, it is a series of overlapping vignettes, each one running about the same length and told in a single, unbroken take, featuring an ensemble cast.

== Plot ==
The story centers on nine stories, each revolving around different women. Imprisoned Sandra has an emotional breakdown when the broken telephone in her cubicle prevents her from communicating with her daughter on visiting day. Diana and Damian, two former flames now married to others, unexpectedly have a poignant reunion in the aisle of the local supermarket. Holly returns home to confront her sexually abusive stepfather and dissolves into gun-waving hysteria. Sonia and Martin, a feuding married couple, have an emotional meltdown while visiting their friends Lisa and Damian in their new apartment. Teenaged Samantha is torn between her non-communicative parents Ruth and Larry, each of whom questions her about everything the other one has to say. Ruth, who is the primary caretaker for her wheelchair-using husband, becomes increasingly guilt-ridden during a tryst with drunken widower Henry in a hotel.

Meanwhile, divorcée Lorna must cope with her ex-husband Andrew's sexual desire for her during his second wife's funeral. Camille is facing breast cancer surgery and uses her waiting time to lash out at her quietly supportive husband Richard. Maggie discusses life with her daughter Maria during a picnic in the cemetery and realizes how much she needs the little girl's loving comfort.

== Cast ==
=== The Nine Women ===
- Elpidia Carrillo as Sandra
- Robin Wright Penn as Diana
- LisaGay Hamilton as Holly
- Holly Hunter as Sonia
- Amanda Seyfried as Samantha
- Amy Brenneman as Lorna
- Sissy Spacek as Ruth
- Kathy Baker as Camille
- Glenn Close as Maggie

=== Supporting players ===
- K Callan as Marisa
- Stephen Dillane as Martin
- Dakota Fanning as Maria
- William Fichtner as Andrew
- Jason Isaacs as Damian
- Joe Mantegna as Richard
- Ian McShane as Larry
- Molly Parker as Lisa
- Mary Kay Place as Alma Wyatt
- Sydney Tamiia Poitier as Vanessa
- Lawrence Pressman as Roman
- Aidan Quinn as Henry
- Miguel Sandoval as Ron

== Release ==
The film premiered at the Sundance Film Festival in January 2005 and was shown at the Los Angeles Film Festival and the Locarno Film Festival, where it won the Golden Leopard for Best Film and the entire cast was awarded the Bronze Leopard for Best Actress, before going into limited release in the US in October. It opened on seven screens and earned $28,387 in its opening weekend. It eventually grossed $478,830 in the US and $1,112,693 in foreign markets for a total worldwide box office of $1,591,523.

== Reception ==
Review aggregator Rotten Tomatoes reports a score of 76% from 86 critics. The critical consensus reads, "Nine Lives is bolstered by a strong cast and features many insightful glimpses into the lives of women". Metacritic gave score a film of 80 based on 25 reviews, indicating "generally favorable reviews".

Stephen Holden of The New York Times described it as "a film that may be the closest movies have come to the cinematic equivalent of a collection of Chekhov short stories. The film's reward for intense concentration is a feeling of deep empathy and connection. For once, you don't harbor the uneasy suspicion of having been emotionally manipulated ... Mr. García has made a film that could be described as radically realistic ... In its subtle, understated performances, the actors vanish into characters who behave like ordinary people observed through one-way glass."

Roger Ebert of the Chicago Sun-Times said, "Rodrigo Garcia ... the son of the novelist Gabriel Garcia Marquez ... has the same love for his characters, and although his stories are all (except for one) realistic, he shares his father's appreciation for the ways lives interweave and we touch each other even if we are strangers. A movie like this, with the appearance of new characters and situations, focuses us; we watch more intently, because it is important what happens."

Ruthe Stein of the San Francisco Chronicle called the film "an emotionally satisfying example of a genre whose sketchiness can be off-putting" and added, "García knows how to create juicy roles for actresses, and they return the favor with performances of such concentrated intensity that you cannot take your eyes off them."

Michael Wilmington of the Chicago Tribune awarded the film four out of five stars, describing it as "one of the most interesting and original American films out right now" and "a disturbingly frank look at people and relationships in contemporary Los Angeles and a thrilling dramatic showcase for a brilliant cast." He added, "[The] stories might seem the stuff of soap opera, but Garcia and his superb cast turn most of them into dramatic gold. The peculiar overall structure makes them distinctive as well, the way these little semi-Chekhovian, semi-Andre Dubus pieces play out against each other."

Kevin Thomas of the Los Angeles Times called it "that rare episode film that actually accrues a cumulative power and doesn't merely proceed from one segment to the next. By the time it's over it has become a testament to the inner resilience of women in coping with a critical moment in their lives ... Each segment seems perfectly shaped and timed, not lasting a second too long yet always of sufficient length to be satisfying in itself. García's large ensemble cast is impeccable, and he and his actors have created a film as memorable as it is subtle ... Nine Lives is a sophisticated, elegant-looking film shot in distinctive, wide-ranging L.A. locales, but its real terrain is the human heart, explored with compassion and respect."

== Accolades ==
- Satellite Award for Best Actress - Motion Picture Drama (Robin Wright Penn, nominee)
- Satellite Award for Best Original Screenplay (nominee)
- ALMA Award for Outstanding Supporting Actress in a Motion Picture (Elpidia Carrillo, winner)
- ALMA Award for Director of a Motion Picture (nominee)
- National Board of Review Award for Excellence In Filmmaking (winner)
- Independent Spirit Award for Best Director (nominee)
- Independent Spirit Award for Best Screenplay (nominee)
- Independent Spirit Award for Best Supporting Actress (Robin Wright Penn, nominee)
- William Shatner's The Golden Groundhog Awards for Best Underground Movie (nominee)
- Gotham Independent Film Award for Best Ensemble Cast (nominee)

== See also ==
- List of American films of 2005
