= Love Child (1982 film) =

1982 film by Larry Peerce

- Theatrical release poster
- Directed by: Larry Peerce
- Written by: Anne Gerard; Katherine Specktor
- Produced by: Paul Maslansky
- Starring: Amy Madigan; Beau Bridges; Mackenzie Phillips; Albert Salmi; Joanna Merlin; Margaret Whitton
- Cinematography: James Pergola
- Edited by: Bob Wyman
- Music by: Charles Fox
- Production company: The Ladd Company
- Distributed by: Warner Bros.
- Release date: October 15, 1982
- Running time: 96 minutes
- Country: United States
- Language: English
- Budget: $3.3 million
- Box office: $112,940

Love Child is a 1982 American biographical film directed by Larry Peerce based on the life of Terry Jean Moore, a young woman convicted of robbery who becomes pregnant while in prison. The film stars Amy Madigan in her film debut, Beau Bridges, and Mackenzie Phillips.

== Plot ==
At 19 years old, Terry Jean Moore was convicted of armed robbery. Soon after entering prison, she meets a guard named Jack Hansen. The two start an affair, which falls apart after Moore becomes pregnant with his child. As a prisoner, Terry then faces the harsh reality of losing her baby, but fights the system to keep her child.

== Cast ==
- Amy Madigan as Terry Jean Moore
- Beau Bridges as Jack Hansen
- Mackenzie Phillips as J.J.
- Albert Salmi as Captain Ellis
- Joanna Merlin as Mrs. Sturgis
- Margaret Whitton as Jackie Steinberg

== Reception ==
Janet Maslin of The New York Times found the film a stretch: "Larry Peerce, who directed Love Child, tries for as much prison-movie stridency as the material will bear, but his portrait of Terry is so mild that the film's harsher touches seem gratuitous. The periodic cat-fights among the prisoners are certainly nasty, but they don't contribute to any overall continuity. ...Amy Madigan, a newcomer who plays Terry, makes her a raw-boned, angry tomboy at first; only gradually is the child-crying-out-for-help side of the character revealed. Miss Madigan seems potentially a tough, unusual actress, but Mr. Peerce keeps her at full throttle so much of the time that the performance loses its force. Her wildeyed, furious mannerisms, at first quite arresting, become familiar long before they should. Miss Madigan isn't alone in this; all of the film's characters have a tendency to come on too strong and then wear out their welcomes."

Stanley Kauffmann, however, wrote of Madigan's performance: "...I'm saving the best for last... Madigan, freckled, plain but winning, is simultaneously proud and pathetic, intense and vulnerable. A familiar phrase in the literature about acting is the Illusion of the First Time. It's usually applied to dialogue that has been memorized and rehearsed; in Madigan's case, it can be applied to her entire, fundamentally familiar role. She brings us news, human news." And in The Village Voice, Carrie Rickey wrote that "Love Child ... contains one gem: Amy Madigan's raw-nerve performance."

== Awards ==
- Nominee New Actress of the Year - Golden Globes (Amy Madigan)

== Home media ==
Love Child was released to DVD by Warner Home Video on June 1, 2010, via the Warner Archive DVD-on-demand service available through Amazon.
