= She's So Lovely =

1997 film directed by Nick Cassavetes

- Theatrical release poster
- Directed by: Nick Cassavetes
- Written by: John Cassavetes
- Produced by: René Cleitman; Gérard Depardieu; Harvey Weinstein; Bob Weinstein; Sean Penn; John Travolta
- Starring: Sean Penn; Robin Wright Penn; Harry Dean Stanton; Debi Mazar; John Travolta
- Cinematography: Thierry Arbogast
- Edited by: Petra von Oelffen
- Music by: Joseph Vitarelli
- Distributed by: Miramax Films
- Release date: August 29, 1997
- Running time: 100 minutes
- Countries: United States; France
- Language: English
- Budget: $18 million
- Box office: $7,281,450

She's So Lovely is a 1997 American romantic drama film written by John Cassavetes and directed by his son Nick Cassavetes. At the time of its release, it received special attention because, eight years after his death, it was the first (and still only) film to feature previously unreleased material from John Cassavetes. The film stars Sean Penn and John Travolta as two men who bid for the affection of a woman played by Robin Wright. Harry Dean Stanton co-stars as a friend of Penn's character, and James Gandolfini plays the abusive neighbor.

== Plot ==
Eddie Quinn's unruly wife Maureen drinks and smokes to excess, even though she is pregnant. Eddie has troubles of his own, disappearing for days at a time. When she is physically and sexually assaulted by Kiefer, a neighbor, it is more than Eddie can handle. He shoots someone and lands in a psychiatric hospital.

Ten years go by. Eddie finally returns, only to find Maureen is now a clean, sober, solid citizen, married to a new man, Joey, and a mother of three children, one of whom is Eddie's own daughter. Eddie's return complicates and endangers all of their lives.

== Cast ==
- Sean Penn as Eddie Quinn
- Robin Wright as Maureen Murphy Quinn
- John Travolta as Joey Giamonti
- Harry Dean Stanton as Tony "Shorty" Russo
- Debi Mazar as Georgie
- James Gandolfini as Kiefer
- David Thornton as Saul Sunday
- Susan Traylor as Lucinda
- Bobby Cooper as Cooper
- John Marshall Jones as Leonard
- Kelsey Mulrooney as Jennie
- Neill Barry as Michael
- Gena Rowlands as Miss Jane Green
- Chloe Webb as Nancy Swearingen

== Production ==
The film was co-produced by a French company, with funding from actor Gérard Depardieu, and René Cleitman for Hachette. Depardieu, a friend of the Cassavetes family, had already produced Nick Cassavetes' first film, Unhook the Stars. At Depardieu's request, John Travolta accepted to act in the film for $1 million, much lower than his usual salary.

== Reception ==
=== Critical response ===
On the review aggregator website Rotten Tomatoes, 68% of 40 critics' reviews are positive. Metacritic, which uses a weighted average, assigned the film a score of 61 out of 100, based on 30 critics, indicating "generally favorable" reviews. Audiences polled by CinemaScore gave the film an average grade of "D+" on an A+ to F scale.

Movie critic Roger Ebert rated the film 3 out of 4 stars, writing in the Chicago Sun-Times: "What [Nick Cassavetes] understands is that if you want to see true weirdness, you don't look along skid row, where the motives are pretty easy to understand, but out in suburbia, where those green lawns can surround human time bombs." Writing in Time Out New York, Andrew Johnston remarked, "Watching the films of John Cassavetes now, one is struck by how complex and human his characters are, compared with those in even the most sophisticated of today's independent films. This effect is even more pronounced in She's So Lovely, an unproduced Cassavetes script given the '90s treatment and filled with stars by the late director's son. The final product features some of the year's best performances...."

=== Awards ===
Sean Penn won the award for Best Actor at the 1997 Cannes Film Festival. Robin Wright received a nomination for Outstanding Performance by a Female Actor in a Leading Role at the 4th Screen Actors Guild Awards.
