= Denial (1990 film) =

1990 film

- Directed by: Erin Dignam
- Written by: Erin Dignam
- Starring: Robin Wright; Jason Patric; Rae Dawn Chong
- Release date: January 1990
- Running time: 103 minutes
- Country: United States
- Language: English

Denial is a 1990 American drama film, written and directed by Erin Dignam. The film features Robin Wright as Sara, a sometime actress, and tall, dark, handsome loner Michael (Jason Patric), as lovers. Michael inhabits the realm of obsessional love with Sara becoming his sickness, as he calls it—or her. The film premiered January 21, 1990 at the Sundance Film Festival.

== Cast ==
- Robin Wright as Sara/Loon
- Jason Patric as Michael
- Barry Primus as Jay
- Christine Harnos as Sid
- Rae Dawn Chong as Julie
- Elizabeth Bracco as Lizzie
- Rosalind Chao as Terry
- Chris Mulkey as Chad
- David Duchovny as John
- Justin Whalin as Jason
