= Robin Wright =

American actress (born 1966)

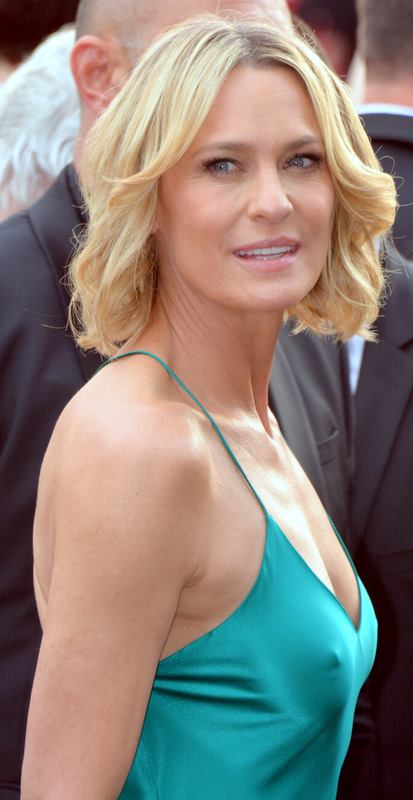
- Wright attending the 2017 Cannes Film Festival
- Born: Robin Gayle Wright; April 8, 1966 (age 60); Dallas, Texas, U.S.
- Other name: Robin Wright Penn
- Occupations: Actress; producer; director
- Years active: 1983–present
- Spouses: Dane Witherspoon (m. 1986; div. 1988) Sean Penn (m. 1996; div. 2010) Clément Giraudet (m. 2018; div. 2022)
- Children: Dylan Penn; Hopper Penn
- Relatives: Charlie Wright (nephew)
- Awards: Full list

Robin Gayle Wright (born April 8, 1966) is an American actress, producer and director. She has received accolades including a Golden Globe Award, and nominations for eight Primetime Emmy Awards.

Wright first gained attention for her role as Kelly Capwell in the NBC Daytime soap opera Santa Barbara from 1984 to 1988. She transitioned to film with a starring role in the fantasy film The Princess Bride (1987), and gained a nomination for a Golden Globe Award for Best Supporting Actress for her role in the top-grossing drama Forrest Gump (1994). Wright had further starring roles in the romantic drama Message in a Bottle (1999) as well as the thriller Unbreakable (2000), and gained praise for her performances in the independent films Loved (1997), She's So Lovely (1997), Nine Lives (2005) and Sorry, Haters (2006). She has since taken on supporting roles in the sports drama Moneyball (2011), the thriller The Girl with the Dragon Tattoo (2011), the adventure film Everest (2015), the superhero film Wonder Woman (2017), and the science fiction film Blade Runner 2049 (2017).

On television, Wright starred in the HBO miniseries Empire Falls in 2005. From 2013 to 2018, she starred as Claire Underwood in the Netflix political drama series House of Cards. Her performance earned a Golden Globe Award for Best Actress and six nominations for a Primetime Emmy Award for Outstanding Lead Actress. In 2016, Wright was named one of the highest-paid actresses in the United States, earning US$420,000 per episode for House of Cards. She has also directed ten episodes of the series as well as two episodes of the Netflix crime series Ozark in 2022.

== Early life and education ==
Robin Wright was born on April 8, 1966, in Dallas, Texas. She has an older brother, and her mother's name is Gayle. Her parents divorced when she was two, which led to her relocating to San Diego, California, with her mother.

She grew up in Southern California, attending La Jolla High School in La Jolla and William Howard Taft Charter High School in Los Angeles.

== Career ==
Wright began her career as a model, when she was 14. From age 18 to 22 she played Kelly Capwell in the NBC Daytime soap opera Santa Barbara, for which she received several Daytime Emmy Award nominations.

=== 1980s–2000s: Transition into feature films ===
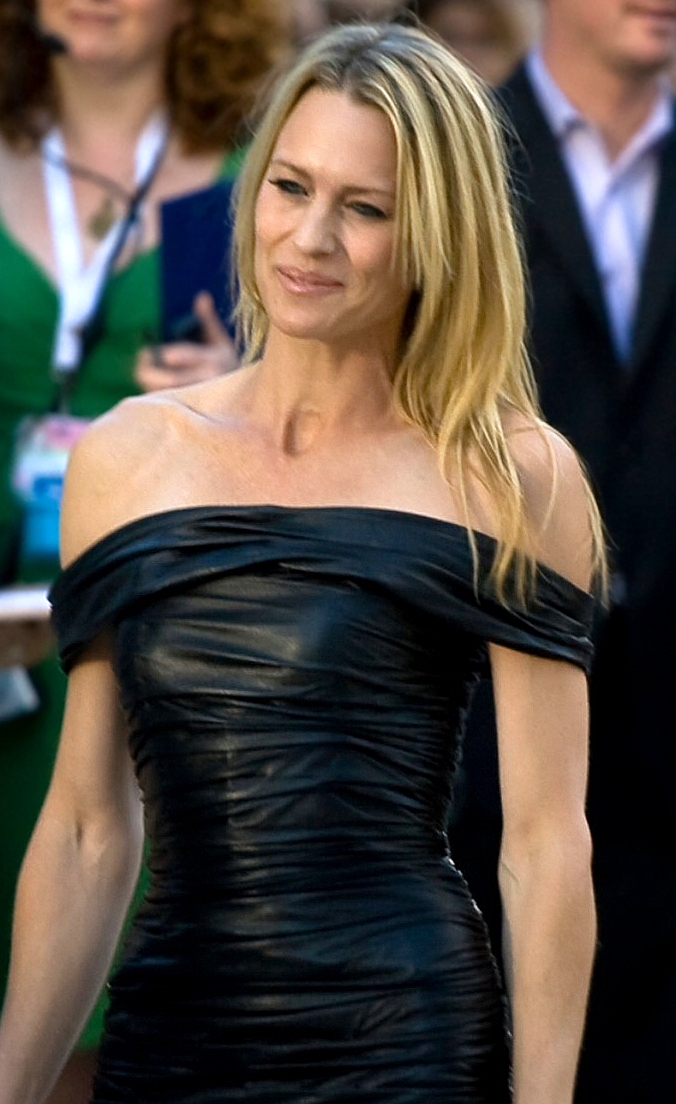
Wright attending the 2009 Toronto International Film Festival

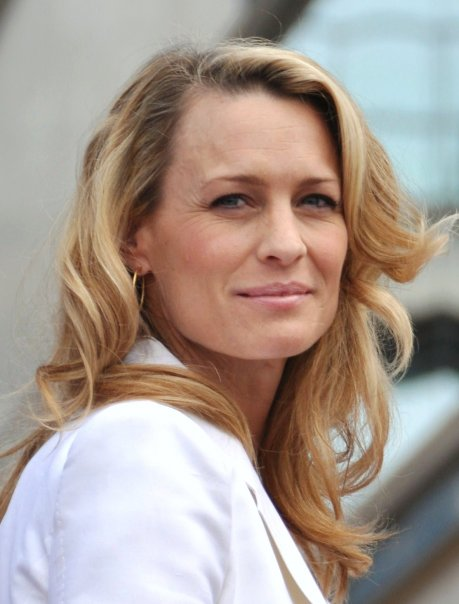
Wright in 2009

Wright transitioned into feature film work with a role in Hollywood Vice Squad in 1986, followed by her breakthrough role as Princess Buttercup in the cult film The Princess Bride in 1987. She gained critical acclaim in her role as Jenny Curran in Forrest Gump (1994), receiving Golden Globe Award and Screen Actors Guild nominations for Best Supporting Actress.

Wright starred in a leading role of the film adaptation of Daniel Defoe's Moll Flanders (1996), for which she received a Satellite Award nomination for Best Actress in a Drama. She appeared in independent films, including Loved (1997), She's So Lovely (1997), Nine Lives (2005) and Sorry, Haters (2006), and was nominated for a Screen Actors Guild Award for Best Actress for her role in She's So Lovely, a film in which she co-starred with her then-husband Sean Penn. Wright starred with Kevin Costner in Luis Mandoki's 1999 film adaptation of Nicholas Sparks' novel Message in a Bottle. In 2000, she starred in the supernatural thriller Unbreakable. She received her third Screen Actors Guild Award nomination for her role in the television film Empire Falls (2005). She had supporting roles in the sports drama Moneyball (2011) and the thriller The Girl with the Dragon Tattoo (2011).

=== 2013–2018: House of Cards ===
From 2013 to 2018, Wright appeared in the Netflix political drama streaming television series House of Cards in the role of Claire Underwood, the ruthless wife of political mastermind Frank Underwood. On January 12, 2014, she won a Golden Globe for the role, becoming the first actress to win the award for a streaming television series. She was nominated for the same award in 2015. She received nominations for the Primetime Emmy Award in 2013 and 2014 for the same role.

Following Season 4 in 2016, Wright stated that she felt Claire Underwood was the equal of Frank Underwood and demanded equal pay for her performance as her co-star Kevin Spacey. Netflix acquiesced. In 2017, for her performance in the fifth season, Wright was nominated for her fifth consecutive Primetime Emmy for Outstanding Lead Actress in a Drama Series. In 2014, 2016, and 2017, Wright received Best Actress in a Drama Series nominations for the Critics' Choice Television Awards, with hers being the only nomination for the show in December 2017.

In October 2017, she was the show's new lead for the final season, following the firing of Kevin Spacey due to sexual misconduct allegations. For her last appearance as Underwood, her performance was acclaimed - described as a "commanding performance [that] is more than enough to keep [the final season] standing strong" - earning her final nominations for the role at the Screen Actors Guild and Primetime Emmy Awards in 2019. For the latter, she became one of seven women to be nominated for the category six or more times for the same show, the first in 10 years since Mariska Hargitay for Law & Order: Special Victims Unit.

=== Further film and directorial work ===
In 2015, Wright appeared as part of the ensemble cast in the adventure film Everest. In 2017, she directed a short film, The Dark of Night, which starred Sam Rockwell and premiered at the Cannes Film Festival. Wright played General Antiope in Wonder Woman in 2017, and its 2020 sequel alongside Gal Gadot and Chris Pine. The film earned positive reviews and emerged as a financial success, grossing $822.8 million at the box office. She appears in the Blade Runner sequel Blade Runner 2049 alongside Ryan Gosling, Harrison Ford, and Jared Leto, directed by Denis Villeneuve.

Her feature film directorial debut in the film Land was announced in April 2019. Wright starred as its lead, Edee Mathis, a lawyer who retreats in grief to the Shoshone National Forest in Wyoming. Sales for the film start at Cannes in May 2019. Filming began in October 2019 and the film was picked up by distributor Focus Features.

Land premiered in January 2021 at the Sundance Film Festival to generally positive reviews, with specific praise towards the direction and the performances. Peter Debruge in a review for Variety wrote: "So bless Wright for paring “Land” down to a beautiful haiku, and for delivering a performance that's ambiguous and understated in all the right ways," and "in a directorial debut so pure and simple it speaks to enormous self-confidence, has better instincts than to reveal outright."

In 2022, Wright directed the final two episodes of the first part of season 4 of the Netflix show, Ozark. The episodes were titled: "Sangre Sobre Todo" and "Sanctified". Kayla Cobb for Decider praised Wright's direction in the latter episode as "powerful" with the pairing of her direction, the script and actress Julia Garner's performance as a "masterful collaboration."

In 2023, Wright starred in and produced Ben Young's thriller Devil's Peak, an adaptation of the book Where All Light Tends to Go by David Joy.

In 2024, Wright starred in the Netflix fantasy film Damsel directed by Juan Carlos Fresnadillo and co-starring Millie Bobby Brown, Angela Bassett and Shohreh Aghdashloo. Despite receiving mixed reviews, the film was a commercial hit, receiving 143 million views and becoming the most viewed movie on the streaming platform in the first half of 2024. Later that year, Wright starred in a Sony Pictures Classics and Miramax adaptation of Richard McGuire's Here in a Forrest Gump reteam with director Robert Zemeckis, actor Tom Hanks and writer Eric Roth.

In 2025, Wright received critical acclaim for her directorial and acting work in The Girlfriend, a limited series centered around a power struggle between a mother and her son's girlfriend (played by Olivia Cooke). Proma Khosla for IndieWire wrote: "Wright hits the exact right note of desperate determination [...] she lets loose with an unhinged turn that will guarantee viewers stay through the end." Wright received Golden Globe and Critics' Choice Award nominations for her performance.

== Personal life ==
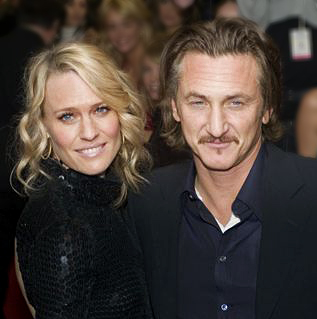
Wright with then-husband Sean Penn in September 2006

From 1986 to 1988, Wright was married to actor Dane Witherspoon, whom she met in 1984 on the set of the soap opera Santa Barbara.

In 1989, Wright became involved with actor Sean Penn following his divorce from Madonna. Wright was offered the role of Maid Marian in the film Robin Hood: Prince of Thieves, but turned it down because she was pregnant. Their daughter, Dylan Penn, was born in April 1991. She backed out of the role of Abby McDeere in The Firm (1993) due to her pregnancy with her second child. Their son, Hopper Jack, was born in August 1993.

After breaking up and getting back together, Wright and Penn married in 1996. Their on-and-off relationship seemingly ended in divorce plans, announced in December 2007. The divorce petition was withdrawn four months later at the couple's request. In February 2009, Wright and Penn attended the 81st Academy Awards together, at which Penn won the Best Actor award. Penn filed for legal separation in April 2009, but withdrew the petition in May. In August 2009, Wright filed for divorce, declaring she had no plans to reconcile. The divorce was finalized in July 2010.

In February 2012, Wright began dating actor Ben Foster. Their engagement was announced in January 2014. The couple called off their engagement in November 2014, but reunited in January 2015. In August 2015, they announced they were ending their second engagement.

In 2017, Wright began dating Clément Giraudet, an Yves Saint Laurent executive. They secretly wed in August 2018 in La Roche-sur-le-Buis, France. Wright filed for divorce from Giraudet in September 2022.

Robin is currently dating British-Australian architect Henry Smith. The couple moved to England, and Wright described Smith as "a sweet guy and a decent, good adult." Although she is happy in the relationship, the actress considers marrying again unnecessary.

== Philanthropy and activism ==
Wright is the honorary spokesperson for the Dallas, Texas-based non-profit The Gordie Foundation.

In 2014, she co-partnered with two California-based companies: Pour Les Femmes and The SunnyLion. The SunnyLion donates a portion of its profits to the Raise Hope For Congo movement.

Wright is an activist for human rights in the Democratic Republic of the Congo. She is the narrator and executive producer of the documentary When Elephants Fight, which highlights how multinational mining corporations and politicians in the Democratic Republic of the Congo threaten human rights, and perpetuate conflict in the region.

She is a supporter of Stand with Congo, the human rights campaign behind the film. In 2016, Wright spoke publicly in support of the campaign at a film-screening at the Tribeca Film Institute in New York City, in media interviews, with journalists, and across her social media accounts.

== Filmography ==
=== Film ===
Year	Title	Role	Notes
1986	Hollywood Vice Squad	Lori Stanton	
1987	Home	Valerie Kane	
1987	The Princess Bride	Buttercup	
1990	Denial	Sara / Loon	
1990	State of Grace	Kathleen Flannery	
1992	The Playboys	Tara Maguire	
1992	Toys	Gwen Tyler	
1994	Forrest Gump	Jenny Curran	
1995	The Crossing Guard	Jojo	
1996	Moll Flanders	Moll Flanders	
1997	Loved	Hedda Amerson	starts being credited as Robin Wright Penn
1997	She's So Lovely	Maureen Murphy Quinn	
1998	Hurlyburly	Darlene	
1999	Message in a Bottle	Theresa Osborne	
2000	How to Kill Your Neighbor's Dog	Melanie McGowan	
2000	Unbreakable	Audrey Dunn	
2001	The Pledge	Lori	
2001	The Last Castle	Rosalie Irwin	Uncredited
2002	Searching for Debra Winger	Herself	Documentary film
2002	White Oleander	Starr Thomas	
2003	The Singing Detective	Nicola / Nina / Blonde	
2003	Virgin	Mrs. Reynolds	Also executive producer
2004	A Home at the End of the World	Clare	
2005	Nine Lives	Diana	
2005	Sorry, Haters	Phoebe Torrence	
2005	Max	Mother	Short film
2006	Breaking and Entering	Liv	
2006	Room 10	Frannie Jones	Short film
2007	Hounddog	Ellen	Also executive producer
2007	Beowulf	Queen Wealtheow	Voice and motion-capture roles, credited as Robin Wright-Penn
2008	What Just Happened	Kelly	
2008	New York, I Love You	Anna	
2009	State of Play	Anne Collins	
2009	The Private Lives of Pippa Lee	Pippa Lee	
2009	A Christmas Carol	Fan Scrooge / Belle	Voice and motion-capture roles, last credit as Robin Wright Penn
2010	I'm Still Here	Herself	Mockumentary film
2010	The Conspirator	Mary Surratt	
2011	Moneyball	Sharon Beane	
2011	Rampart	Linda Fentress	
2011	The Girl with the Dragon Tattoo	Erika Berger	
2013	The Congress	Robin Wright	Also producer
2013	Adoration	Roz	
2014	A Most Wanted Man	Martha Sullivan	
2014	Until We Could	Narrator	Short film, Voice role
2015	When Elephants Fight	—N/a	Executive producer only
2015	Everest	Peach Weathers	
2017	Vans	Claire	
2017	The Dark of Night	—N/a	Short film, Director and executive producer only
2017	Blade Runner 2049	Lieutenant Joshi	
2017	Wonder Woman	General Antiope	
2017	Justice League	General Antiope	Uncredited cameo
2018	André the Giant	Herself	Documentary film
2020	Wonder Woman 1984	General Antiope	
2021	Land	Edee Holzer	Also director and executive producer
2021	Zack Snyder's Justice League	General Antiope	
2023	Devil's Peak	Virgie	Also producer
2024	Damsel	Queen Isabelle	
2024	Here	Margaret Young	

=== Television ===
†	Denotes series that have not yet been released

Year	Title	Role	Notes
1983–1984	The Yellow Rose	Barbara Anderson	2 episodes
1984–1988	Santa Barbara	Kelly Capwell	538 episodes
2005	Empire Falls	Grace Roby	Miniseries, only television credit as Robin Wright Penn
2011	Enlightened	Sandy	1 episode
2013–2018	House of Cards	Claire Underwood	Main role, executive producer (seasons 4–6) and director (10 episodes)
2020	First Ladies	Narrator	6 episodes, Voice role
2022	Ozark	—N/a	Director only, episodes: "Sangre Sobre Todo" and "Sanctified"
2025	The Girlfriend	Laura Sanderson	Main role, executive producer (6 episodes) and director (3 episodes)
