= List of awards and nominations received by George C. Scott =

George C. Scott awards and nominations
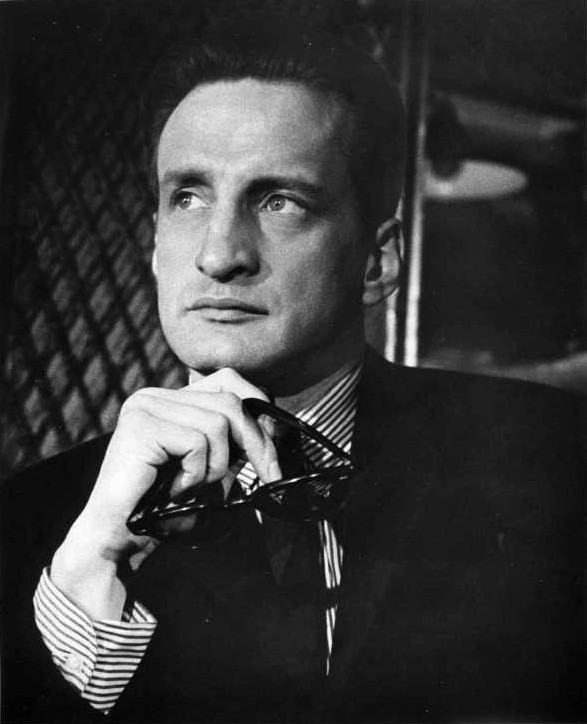
- Scott in The Hustler (1961), for which he received Academy Award nomination for Best Supporting Actor
Awards and nominations
Award	Wins	Nominations
Academy Award	1	4
Actor Awards	0	2
BAFTA Awards	0	2
Golden Globe Award	2	6
Primetime Emmy Award	2	8
Tony Awards	0	5

George C. Scott (October 18, 1927 – September 22, 1999) was an American actor, director, and producer who had a celebrated career on both stage and screen. Over the course of his career, he earned four Academy Award nominations, winning for Best Actor for his performance in Patton. His performances won him widespread recognition and numerous other accolades, including two Primetime Emmy Awards, two Golden Globe Awards, two British Academy Film Award nominations, two Actor Awards nominations and five Tony Award nominations.

== Major awards ==
=== Academy Awards ===
Year	Category	Nominated work	Result	Ref.
1959	Best Supporting Actor	Anatomy of a Murder	Nominated	
1961	Best Supporting Actor	The Hustler	Nominated (Note: Refused Nomination)	
1970	Best Actor	Patton	Won (Note: Refused Award)	
1971	Best Actor	The Hospital	Nominated	

=== Actor Awards ===
Year	Category	Nominated work	Result	Ref.
1997	Outstanding Performance by a Male Actor in a Miniseries or Television Movie	12 Angry Men	Nominated	
1999	Outstanding Performance by a Male Actor in a Miniseries or Television Movie	Inherit the Wind	Nominated	

=== British Academy Film Awards ===
Year	Category	Nominated work	Result	Ref.
1970	Best Actor in a Leading Role	Patton	Nominated	
1972	Best Actor in a Leading Role	The Hospital and They Might Be Giants	Nominated	

=== Golden Globe Awards ===
Year	Category	Nominated work	Result	Ref.
1961	Best Supporting Actor – Motion Picture	The Hustler	Nominated	
1961	Most Promising Newcomer – Male	The Hustler	Nominated	
1970	Best Actor in a Motion Picture – Drama	Patton	Won	
1971	Best Actor in a Motion Picture – Drama	The Hospital	Nominated	
1978	Best Actor in a Motion Picture – Musical or Comedy	Movie Movie	Nominated	
1997	Best Supporting Actor – Series, Miniseries or Television Film	12 Angry Men	Won	

=== Primetime Emmy Awards ===
Year	Category	Nominated work	Result	Ref.
1962	Outstanding Performance in a Supporting Role by an Actor	Ben Casey (Episode: "I Remember a Lemon Tree")	Nominated	
1964	Outstanding Continued Performance by an Actor in a Series (Lead)	East Side/West Side	Nominated	
1968	Outstanding Single Performance by an Actor in a Leading Role in a Drama	The Crucible	Nominated	
1971	Outstanding Single Performance by an Actor in a Leading Role	Hallmark Hall of Fame (Episode: "The Price")	Won	
1972	Outstanding Single Performance by an Actor in a Leading Role	Jane Eyre	Nominated	
1977	Outstanding Lead Actor in a Drama or Comedy Special	Beauty and the Beast	Nominated	
1985	Outstanding Lead Actor in a Limited Series or a Special	A Christmas Carol	Nominated	
1998	Outstanding Supporting Actor in a Miniseries or a Movie	12 Angry Men	Won	

=== Tony Awards ===
Year	Category	Nominated work	Result	Ref.
1959	Best Featured Actor in a Play	Comes a Day	Nominated	
1960	Best Leading Actor in a Play	The Andersonville Trial	Nominated	
1974	Best Leading Actor in a Play	Uncle Vanya	Nominated	
1976	Best Leading Actor in a Play	Death of a Salesman	Nominated	
1996	Best Leading Actor in a Play	Inherit the Wind	Nominated	

== Miscellaneous awards ==
=== CableACE Awards ===
Year	Category	Nominated work	Result	Ref.
1997	Supporting Actor in a Movie or Miniseries	12 Angry Men	Won	

=== Clarence Derwent Awards ===
Year	Category	Nominated work	Result	Ref.
1958	Most Promising Male Performer	Richard III	Won	

=== Drama Desk Awards ===
Year	Category	Nominated work	Result	Ref.
1958	Vernon Rice Award	Children of Darkness	Nominated	
1983	Outstanding Director of a Play	Present Laughter	Nominated	
1996	Special Award	Lifetime Devotion to Theatre	Nominated	

=== Fantafestival ===
Year	Category	Nominated work	Result	Ref.
1982	Best Actor	The Changeling	Won	

=== Genie Awards ===
Year	Category	Nominated work	Result	Ref.
1979	Best Performance by a Foreign Actor	The Changeling	Won	

=== Golden Raspberry Awards ===
Year	Category	Nominated work	Result	Ref.
1990	Worst Actor	The Exorcist III	Nominated	

=== Kansas City Film Critics Circle Awards ===
Year	Category	Nominated work	Result	Ref.
1970	Best Actor	Patton	Won	

=== Laurel Awards ===
Year	Category	Nominated work	Result	Ref.
1970	Top Male Dramatic Performance	Patton	Won	
1970	Top Male Star	—N/a	Nominated	

=== National Board of Review Awards ===
Year	Category	Nominated work	Result	Ref.
1970	Best Actor	Patton	Won	

=== National Society of Film Critics Awards ===
Year	Category	Nominated work	Result	Ref.
1968	Best Actor	Petulia	2nd Place (Note: Tied with Alan Arkin for The Heart Is a Lonely Hunter.)	

=== New York Film Critics Circle Awards ===
Year	Category	Nominated work	Result	Ref.
1968	Best Actor	Petulia	Nominated	
1970	Best Actor	Patton	Won	

=== Obie Awards ===
Year	Category	Nominated work	Result	Ref.
1958	Distinguished Performance by an Actor	Richard III / As You Like It / Children of Darkness	Won	
1963	Distinguished Performance by an Actor	Desire Under the Elms	Won	

=== Online Film & Television Association Awards ===
Year	Category	Nominated work	Result	Ref.
1998	Best Supporting Actor in a Motion Picture or Miniseries	12 Angry Men	Nominated	

=== Outer Critics Circle Awards ===
Year	Category	Nominated work	Result	Ref.
1993	Outstanding Actor in a Play	Wrong Turn at Lungfish	Nominated	
1996	Outstanding Actor in a Play	Inherit the Wind	Won	

=== Stinkers Bad Movie Awards ===
Year	Category	Nominated work	Result	Ref.
1979	Worst Actor	Hardcore	Nominated	

=== Theatre World Awards ===
Year	Category	Nominated work	Result	Ref.
1958	—N/a	Richard III	Won	

=== Western Heritage Awards ===
Year	Category	Nominated work	Result	Ref.
1987	Western Documentary	The Indomitable Teddy Roosevelt	Won	
