= 55th Golden Globe Awards =

Film award ceremony in 1998

- Date: January 18, 1998
- Site: Beverly Hilton Hotel; Beverly Hills, Los Angeles, California

Highlights
- Best Film: Drama: Titanic
- Best Film: Musical or Comedy: As Good As It Gets
- Best Drama Series: The X-Files
- Best Musical or Comedy Series: Ally McBeal
- Most awards: Titanic (4)
- Most nominations: Titanic (8)

Television coverage
- Network: NBC

The 55th Golden Globe Awards, honoring the best in film and television for 1997, were held on January 18, 1998. The nominations were announced on December 18, 1997. The ceremony was watched by 24.3 million viewers, a record at the time.

== Winners and nominees ==
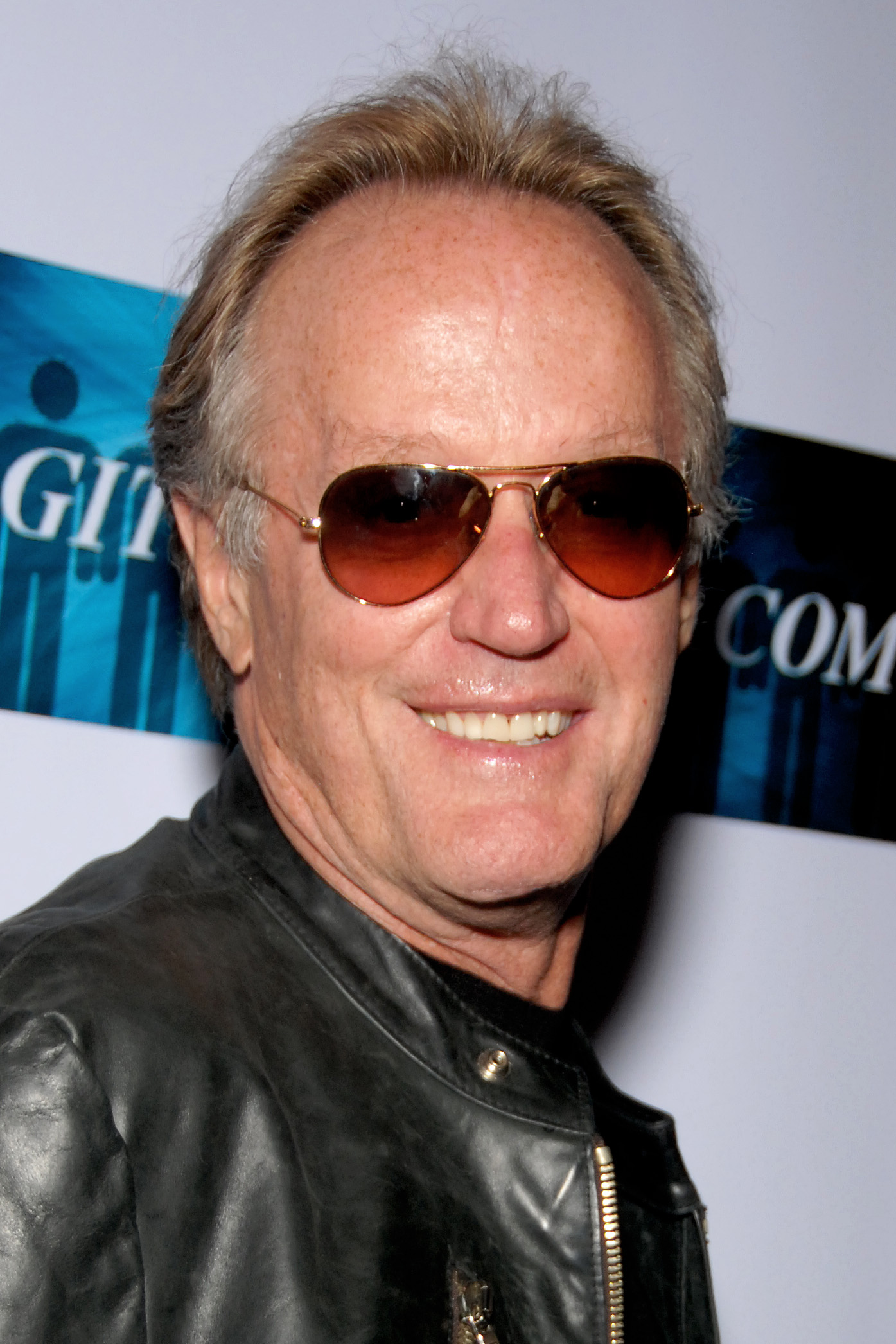
Peter Fonda, Best Actor in a Motion Picture — Drama winner

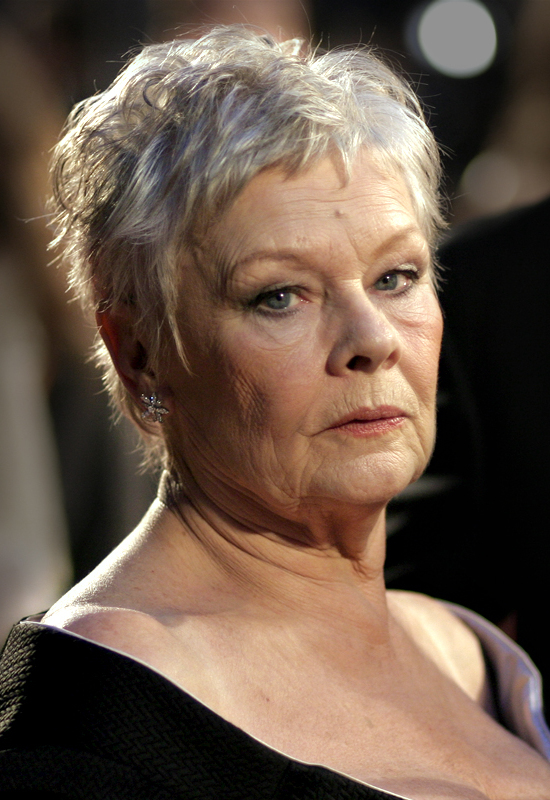
Judi Dench, Best Actress in a Motion Picture — Drama winner

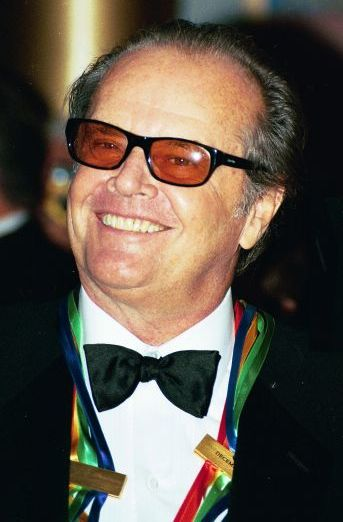
Jack Nicholson, Best Actor in a Motion Picture — Comedy or Musical winner

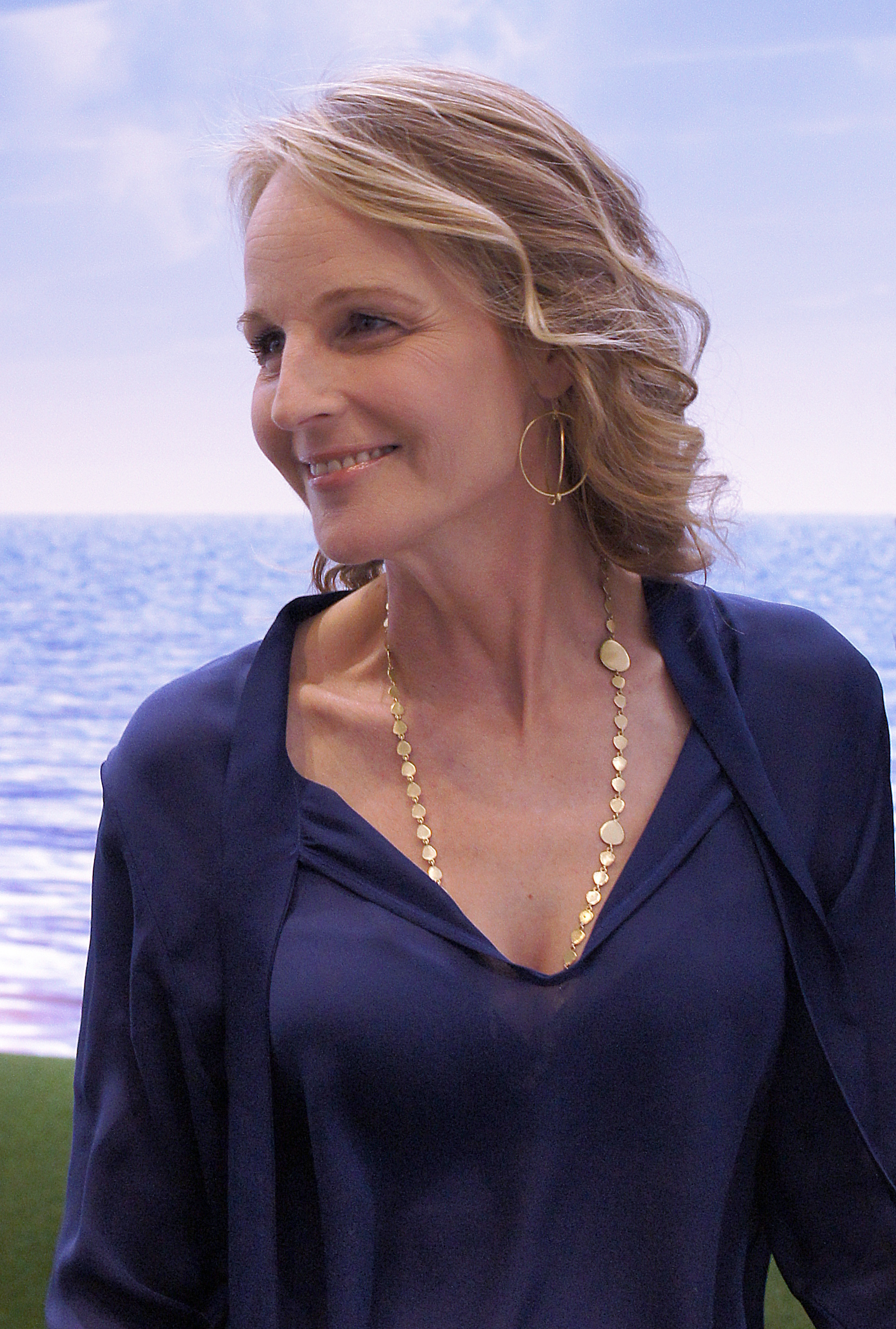
Helen Hunt, Best Actress in a Motion Picture — Comedy or Musical winner

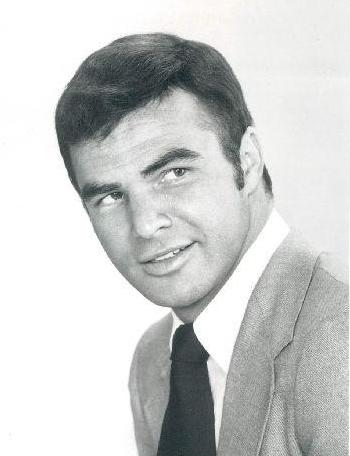
Burt Reynolds, Best Supporting Actor in a Motion Picture — Drama, Comedy or Musical winner

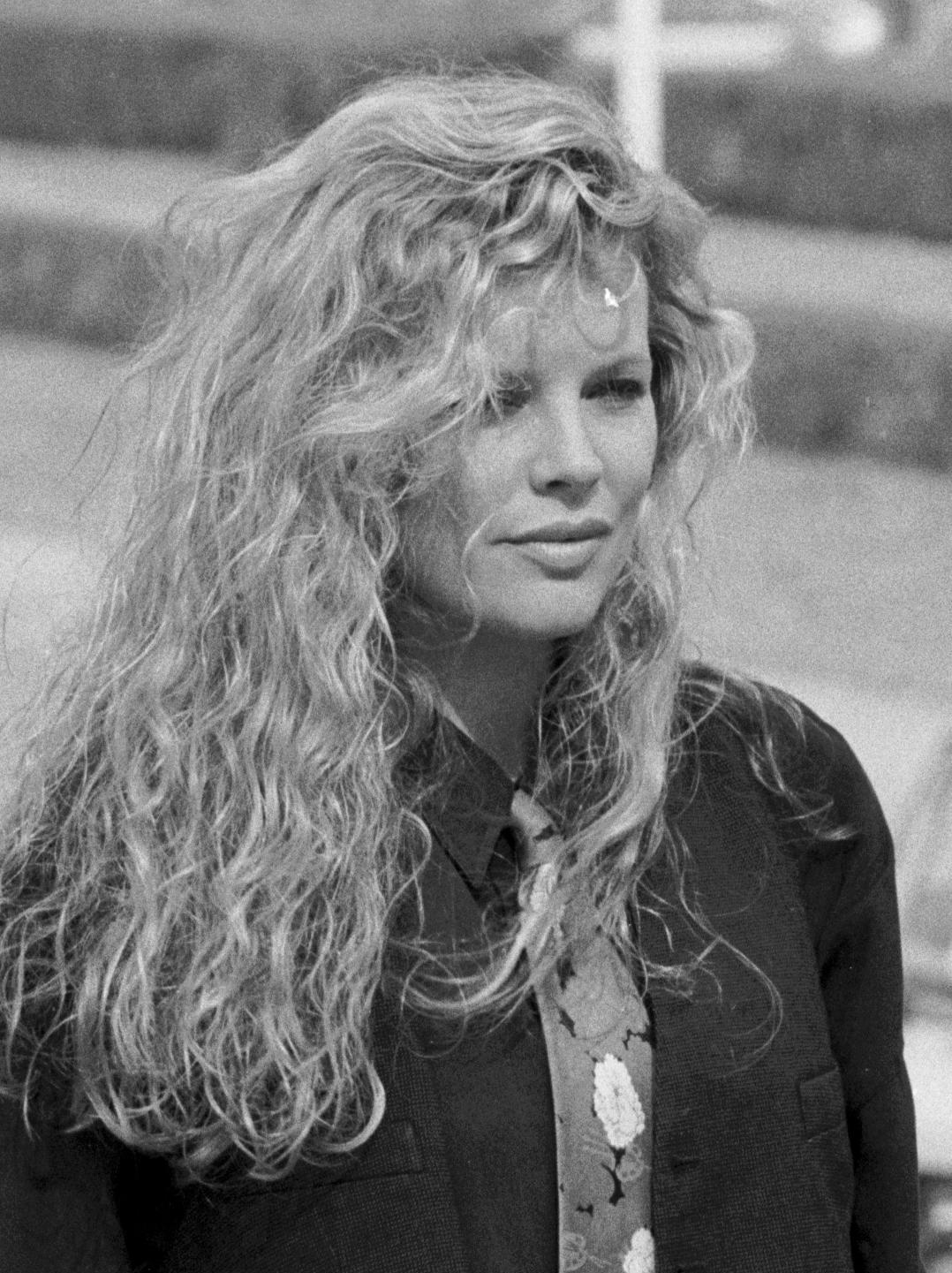
Kim Basinger, Best Supporting Actress in a Motion Picture — Drama, Comedy or Musical winner

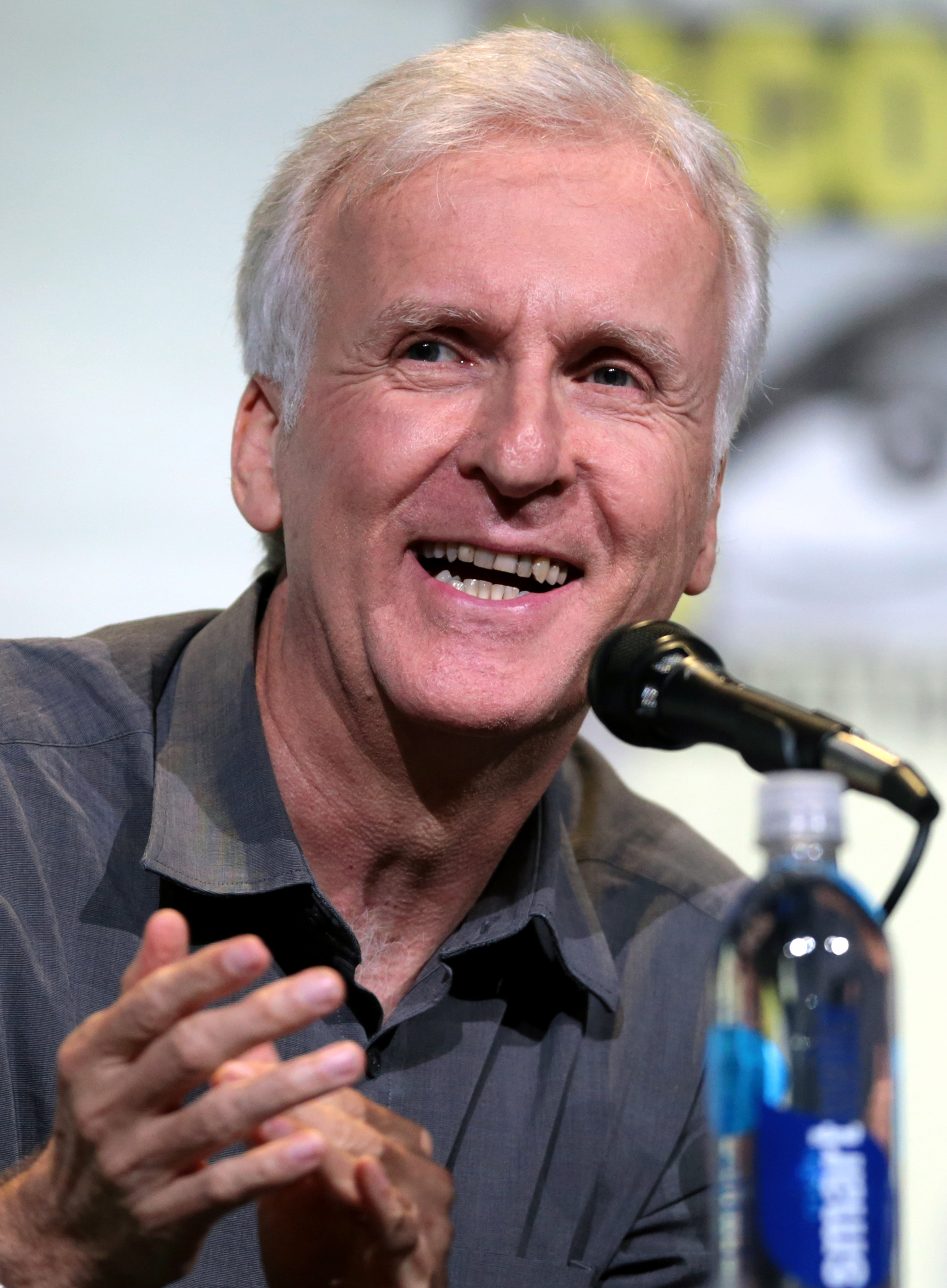
James Cameron, Best Director winner

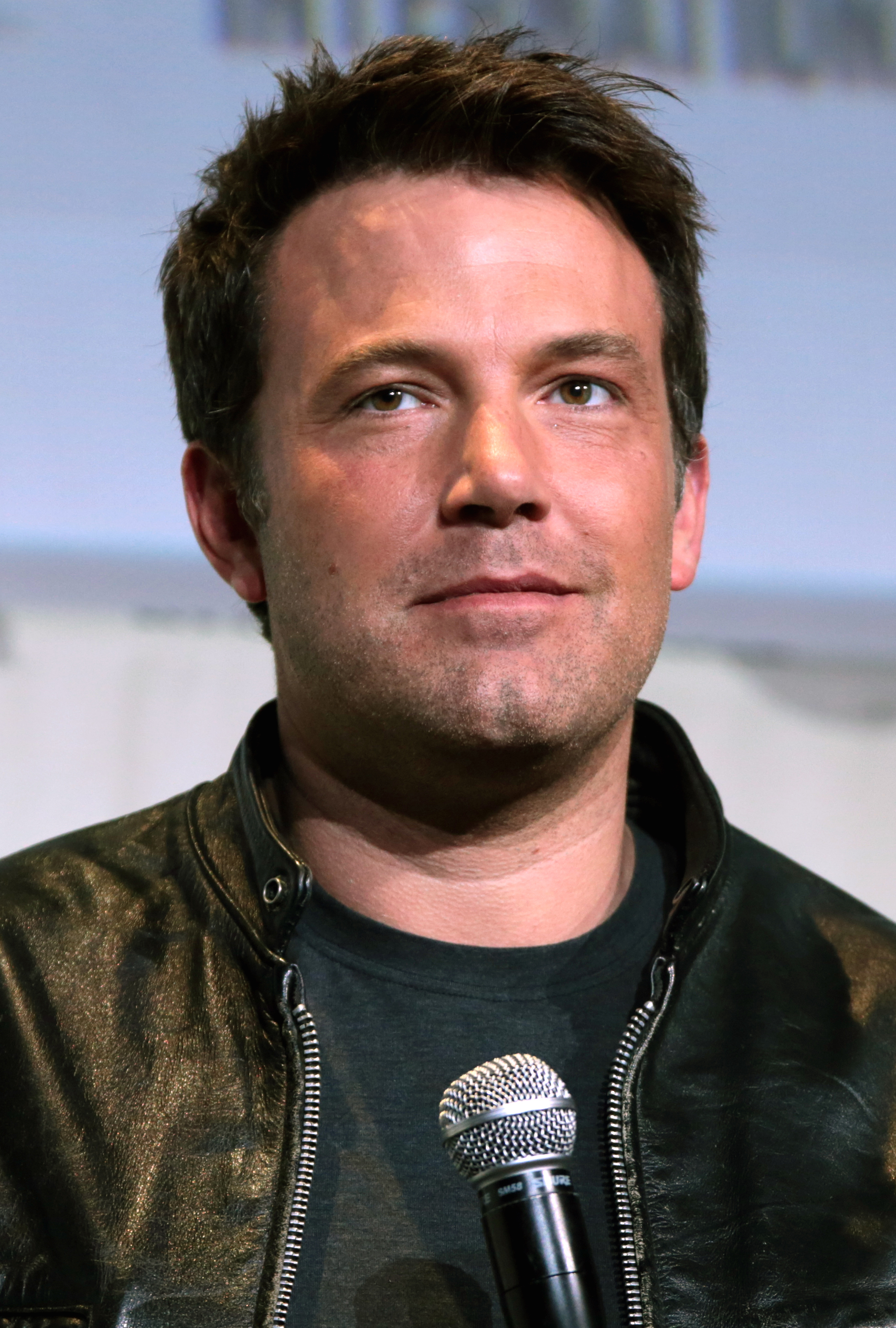
Ben Affleck & Matt Damon, Best Screenplay co-winners

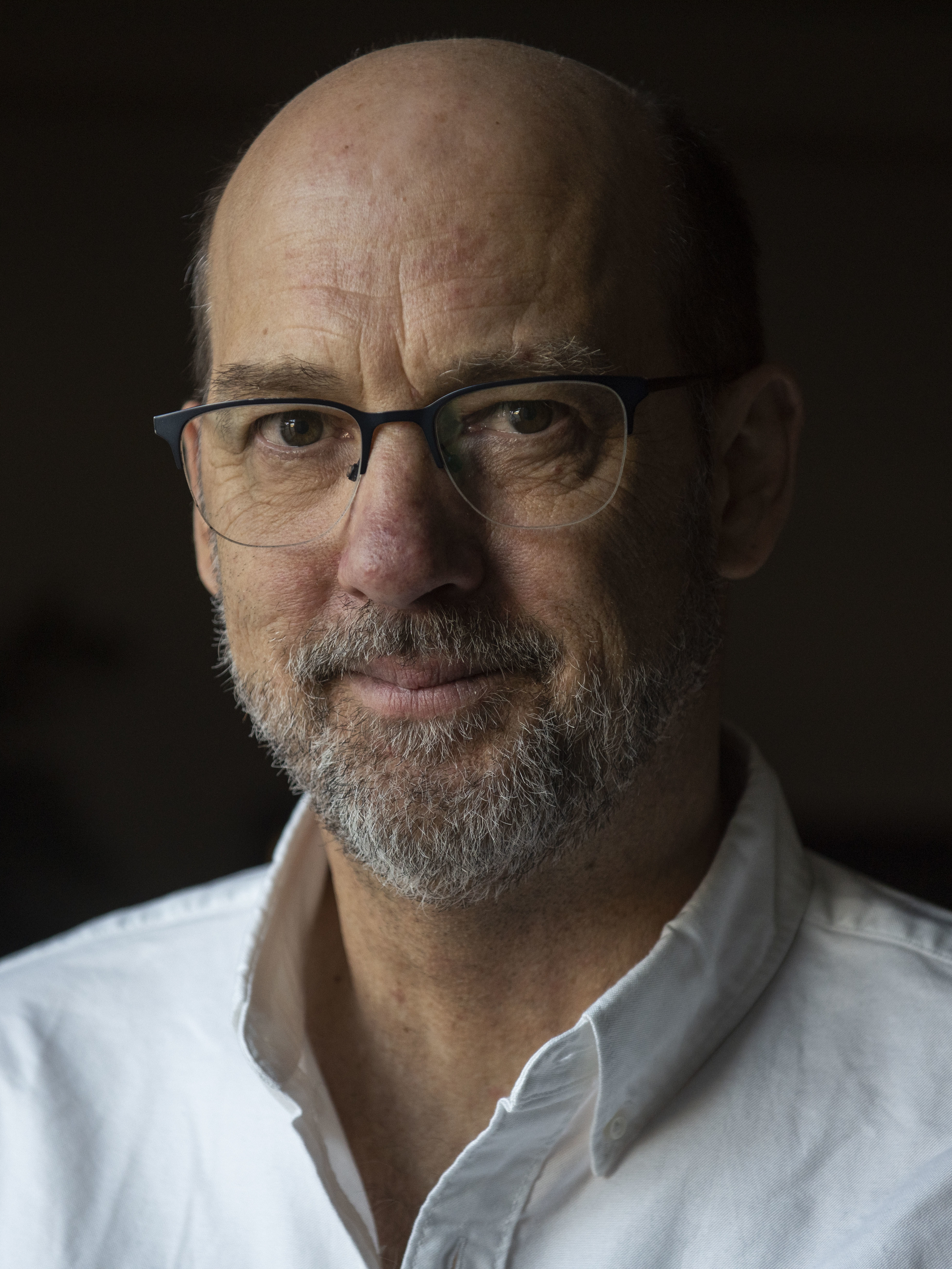
Anthony Edwards, Best Actor in a Television Series — Drama winner

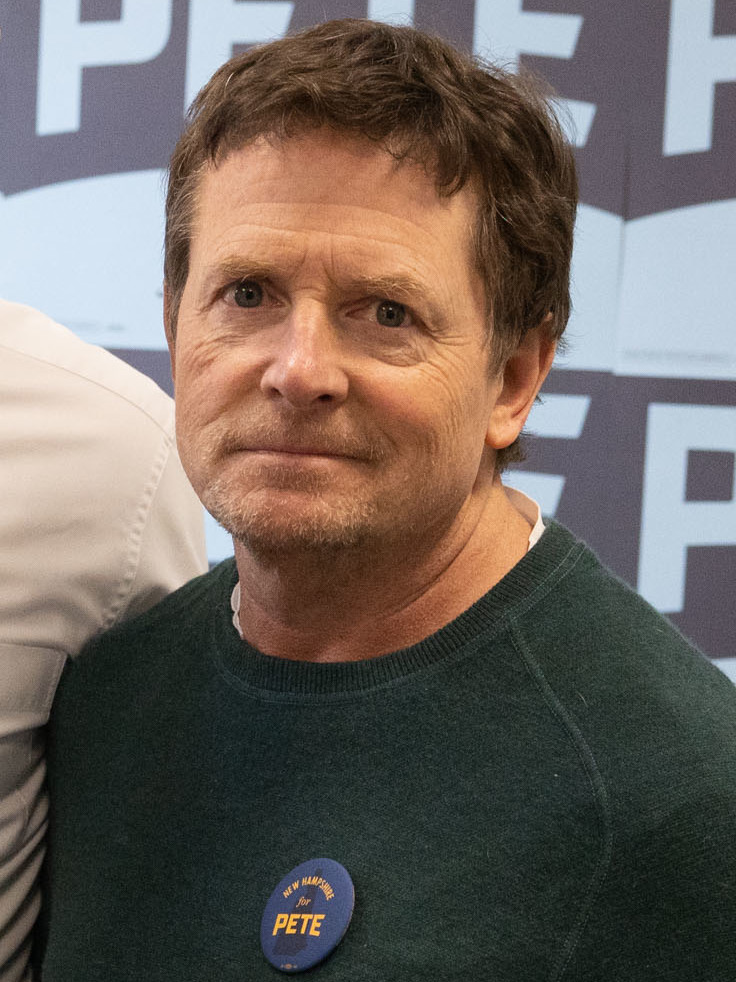
Michael J. Fox, Best Actor in a Television Series — Comedy or Musical winner

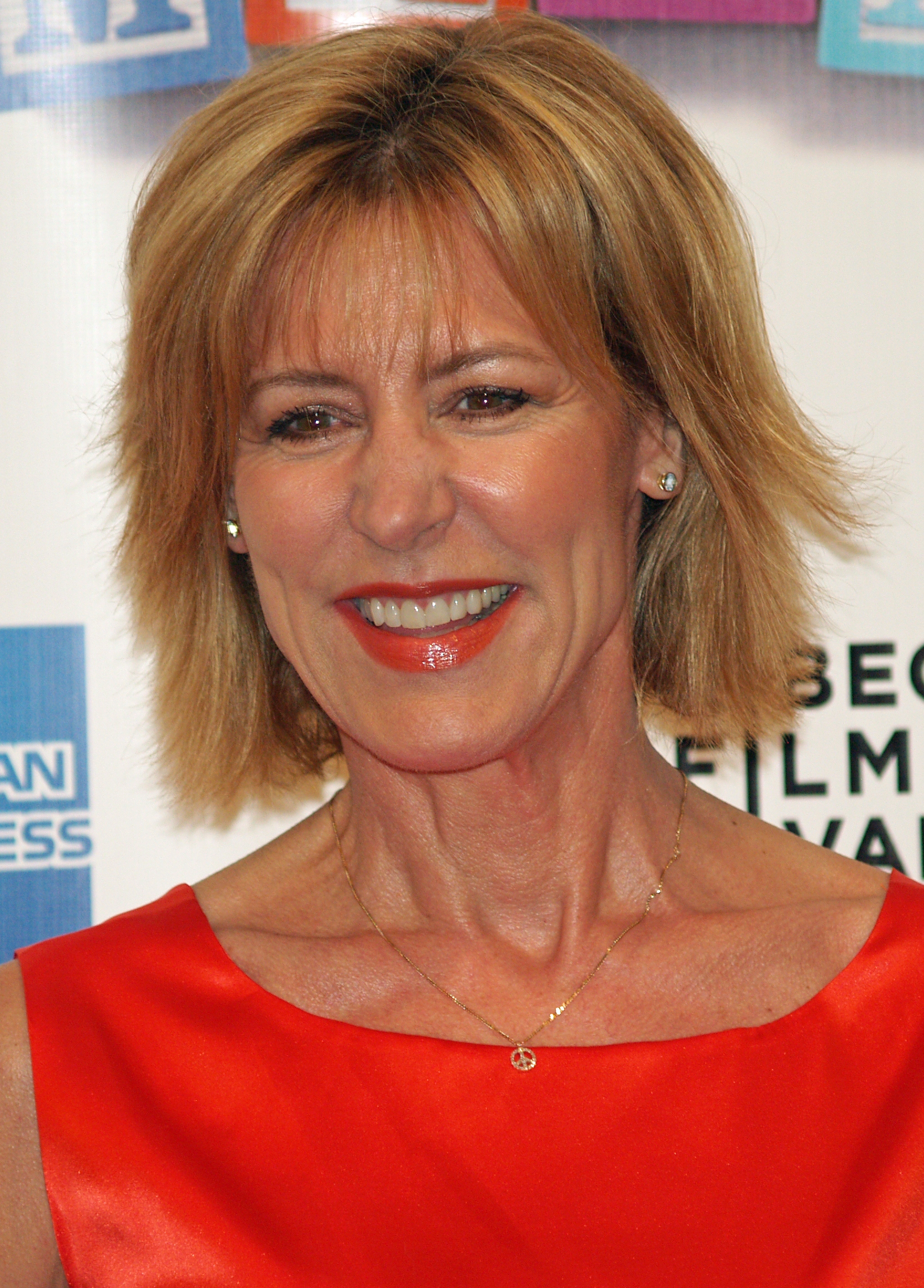
Christine Lahti, Best Actress in a Television Series — Drama winner

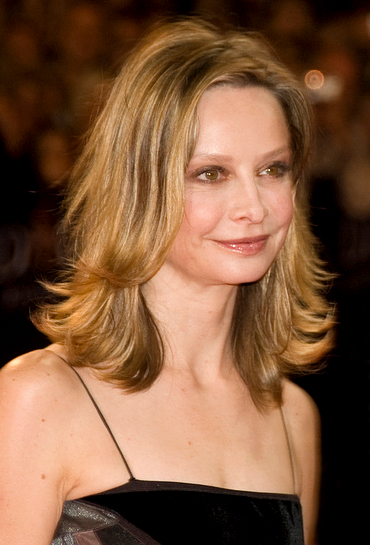
Calista Flockhart, Best Actress in a Television Series — Comedy or Musical winner

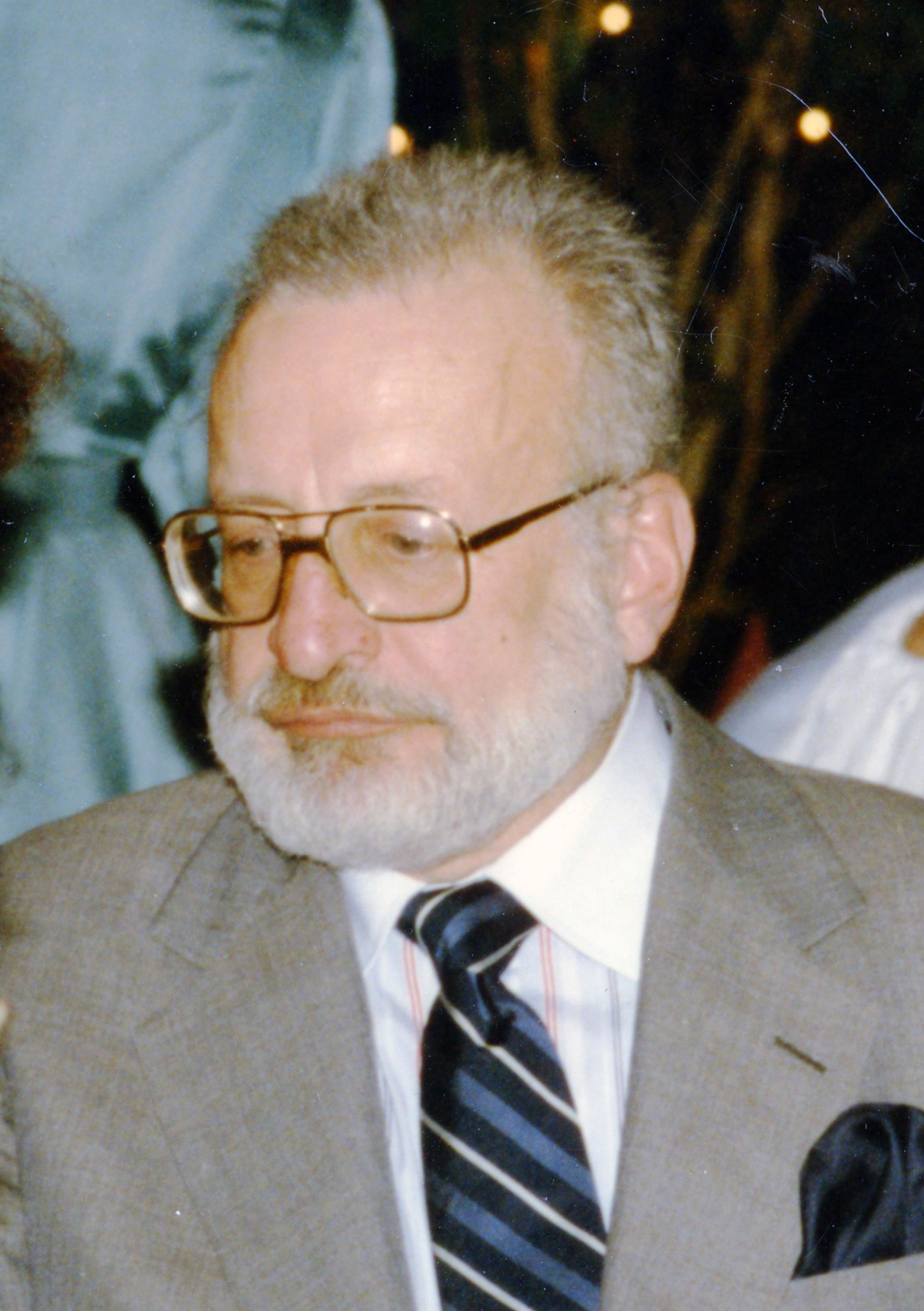
George C. Scott, Best Supporting Actor in a Series, Miniseries or Television Film winner

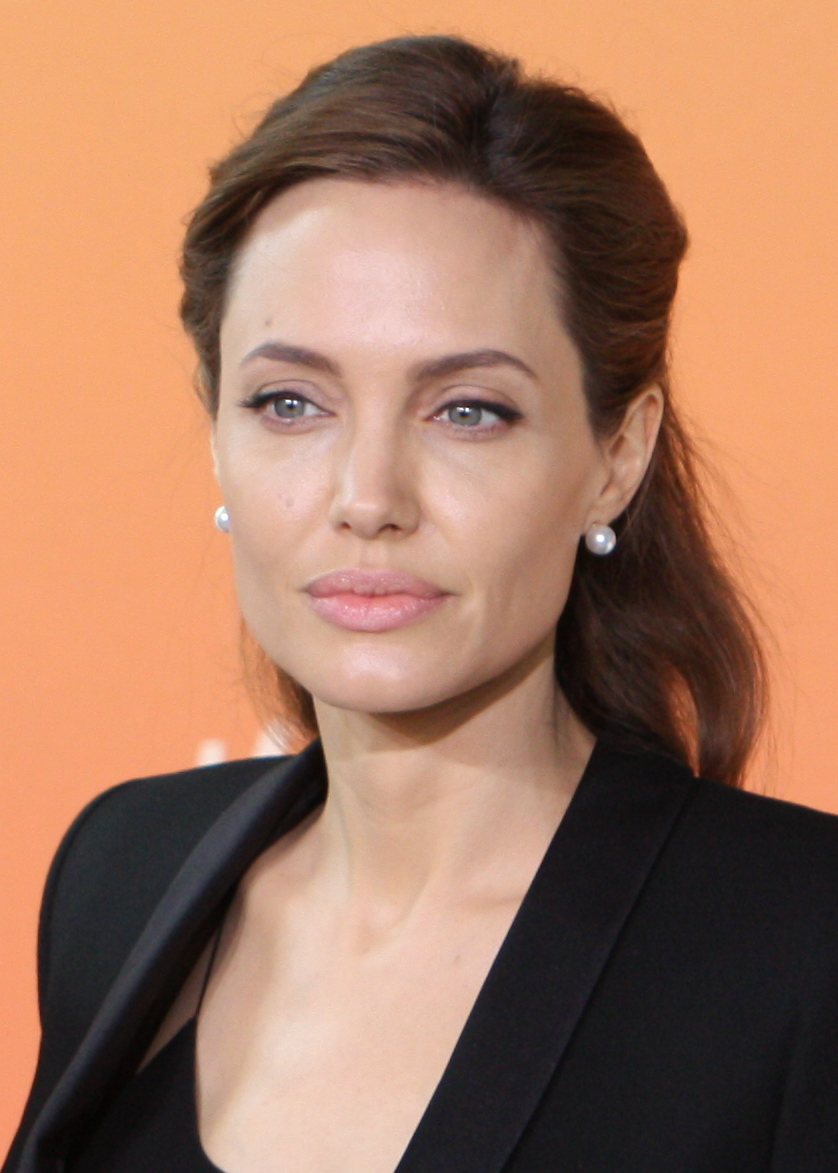
Angelina Jolie, Best Supporting Actress in a Series, Miniseries or Television Film winner

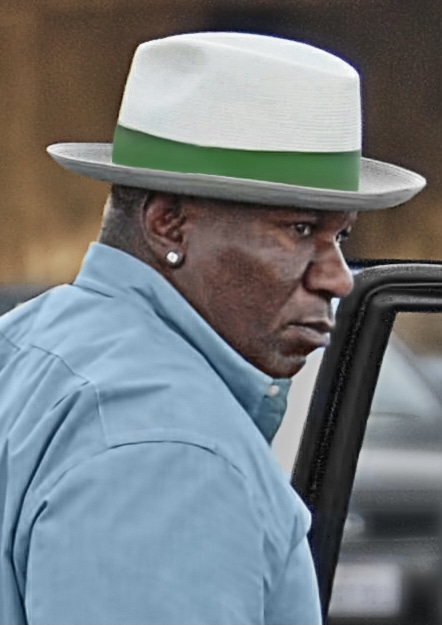
Ving Rhames, Best Actor in a Miniseries or Television Movie winner

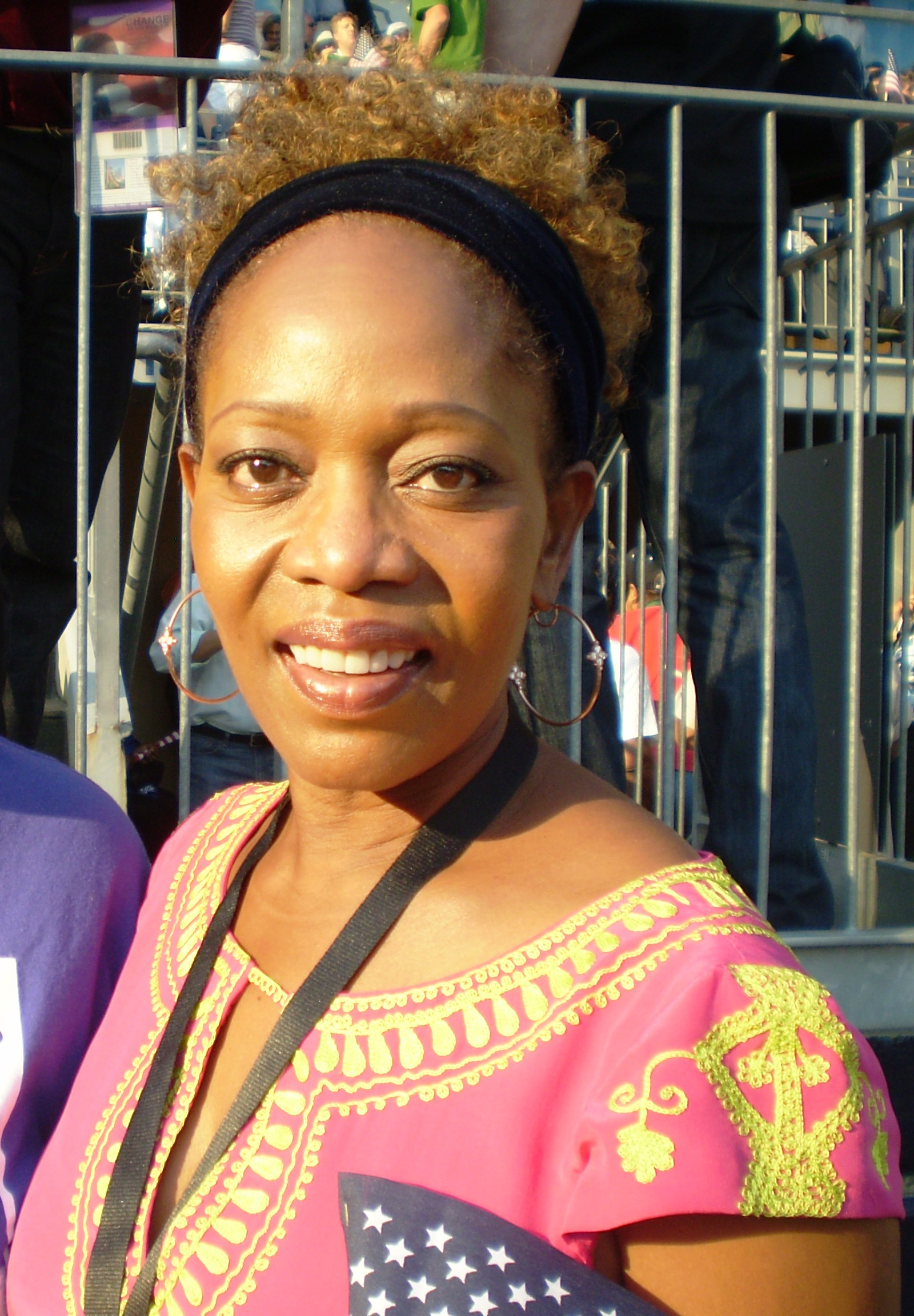
Aflre Woodard, Best Actress in a Miniseries or Television Movie winner

=== Film ===
Best Motion Picture
Drama	Musical or Comedy
Titanic: Amistad; The Boxer; Good Will Hunting; L.A. Confidential	As Good as It Gets: The Full Monty; Men in Black; My Best Friend's Wedding; Wag the Dog
Best Performance in a Motion Picture – Drama
Actor	Actress
Peter Fonda – Ulee's Gold as Ulysses "Ulee" Jackson: Matt Damon – Good Will Hunting as Will Hunting; Daniel Day-Lewis – The Boxer as Danny Flynn; Leonardo DiCaprio – Titanic as Jack Dawson; Djimon Hounsou – Amistad as Joseph Cinqué	Judi Dench – Mrs Brown as Queen Victoria: Helena Bonham Carter – The Wings of the Dove as Kate Croy; Jodie Foster – Contact as Dr. Eleanor "Ellie" Arroway; Jessica Lange – A Thousand Acres as Ginny Cook; Kate Winslet – Titanic as Rose DeWitt Bukater
Best Performance in a Motion Picture – Musical or Comedy
Actor	Actress
Jack Nicholson – As Good as It Gets as Melvin Udall: Jim Carrey – Liar Liar as Fletcher Reede; Dustin Hoffman – Wag the Dog as Stanley Motss; Samuel L. Jackson – Jackie Brown as Ordell Robbie; Kevin Kline – In & Out as Howard Brackett	Helen Hunt – As Good as It Gets as Carol Connelly: Joey Lauren Adams – Chasing Amy as Alyssa Jones; Pam Grier – Jackie Brown as Jackie Brown; Jennifer Lopez – Selena as Selena Quintanilla Pérez; Julia Roberts – My Best Friend's Wedding as Julianne "Jules" Potter
Best Supporting Performance in a Motion Picture – Drama, Musical or Comedy
Supporting Actor	Supporting Actress
Burt Reynolds – Boogie Nights as Jack Horner: Rupert Everett – My Best Friend's Wedding as George Downes; Anthony Hopkins – Amistad as Representative John Quincy Adams; Greg Kinnear – As Good as It Gets as Simon Bishop; Jon Voight – The Rainmaker as Leo F. Drummond; Robin Williams – Good Will Hunting as Dr. Sean Maguire	Kim Basinger – L.A. Confidential as Lynn Bracken: Joan Cusack – In & Out as Emily Montgomery; Julianne Moore – Boogie Nights as Maggie / Amber Waves; Gloria Stuart – Titanic as Rose Calvert; Sigourney Weaver – The Ice Storm as Janey Carver
Best Director	Best Screenplay
James Cameron – Titanic: James L. Brooks – As Good as It Gets; Curtis Hanson – L.A. Confidential; Jim Sheridan – The Boxer; Steven Spielberg – Amistad	Good Will Hunting – Ben Affleck and Matt Damon: As Good as It Gets – Mark Andrus and James L. Brooks; L.A. Confidential – Curtis Hanson and Brian Helgeland; Titanic – James Cameron; Wag the Dog – Hilary Henkin and David Mamet
Best Original Score	Best Original Song
Titanic – James Horner: Gattaca – Michael Nyman; Kundun – Philip Glass; L.A. Confidential – Jerry Goldsmith; Seven Years in Tibet – John Williams	"My Heart Will Go On" by Céline Dion – Titanic: "Journey to the Past" by Aaliyah – Anastasia; "Once Upon a December" by Deana Carter – Anastasia; "Go the Distance" by Roger Bart – Hercules; "Tomorrow Never Dies" by Sheryl Crow – Tomorrow Never Dies
Best Foreign Language Film	
My Life in Pink (Ma vie en rose) • Belgium: Artemisia • France; The Best Man (Il testimone dello sposo) • Italy; Lea • Germany; The Thief (Vor) • Russia	

The following films received multiple nominations:

Nominations	Title
8	Titanic
6	As Good as It Gets
5	L.A. Confidential
4	Amistad
4	Good Will Hunting
3	The Boxer
3	My Best Friend's Wedding
3	Wag the Dog
2	Anastasia
2	Boogie Nights
2	In & Out

The following films received multiple wins:

Wins	Title
4	Titanic
3	As Good as It Gets

=== Television ===
Best Television Series
Drama Series	Comedy or Musical - Series
The X-Files: Chicago Hope; ER; Law & Order; NYPD Blue	Ally McBeal: 3rd Rock from the Sun; Frasier; Friends; Seinfeld; Spin City
Best Lead Actor in a Television Series
Best Actor - Drama Series	Best Actor - Comedy or Musical Series
Anthony Edwards – ER: Kevin Anderson – Nothing Sacred; George Clooney – ER; David Duchovny – The X-Files; Lance Henriksen – Millennium	Michael J. Fox – Spin City: Kelsey Grammer – Frasier; John Lithgow – 3rd Rock from the Sun; Paul Reiser – Mad About You; Jerry Seinfeld – Seinfeld
Best Lead Actress in a Television Series
Best Actress - Drama Series	Best Actress - Comedy or Musical Series
Christine Lahti – Chicago Hope: Gillian Anderson – The X-Files; Kim Delaney – NYPD Blue; Roma Downey – Touched by an Angel; Julianna Margulies – ER	Calista Flockhart – Ally McBeal: Kirstie Alley – Veronica's Closet; Ellen DeGeneres – Ellen; Jenna Elfman – Dharma & Greg; Helen Hunt – Mad About You; Brooke Shields – Suddenly Susan
Best Supporting Performance - Series, Miniseries or Television Film
Best Supporting Actor - Series, Miniseries or Television Film	Best Supporting Actress - Series, Miniseries or Television Film
George C. Scott – 12 Angry Men: Jason Alexander – Seinfeld; Michael Caine – Mandela and de Klerk; David Hyde Pierce – Frasier; Eriq La Salle – ER; Noah Wyle – ER	Angelina Jolie – George Wallace: Joely Fisher – Ellen; Della Reese – Touched by an Angel; Gloria Reuben – ER; Mare Winningham – George Wallace
Best Actor - Miniseries or Television Film	Best Actress - Miniseries or Television Film
Ving Rhames – Don King: Only in America: Armand Assante – The Odyssey; Jack Lemmon – 12 Angry Men; Matthew Modine – What the Deaf Man Heard; Gary Sinise – George Wallace	Alfre Woodard – Miss Evers' Boys: Ellen Barkin – Before Women Had Wings; Jena Malone – Hope; Vanessa Redgrave – Bella Mafia; Meryl Streep – ...First Do No Harm
Best Miniseries or Television Film	
George Wallace: 12 Angry Men; Don King: Only in America; Miss Evers' Boys; The Odyssey	

The following programs received multiple nominations:

Nominations	Title
7	ER
4	George Wallace
3	12 Angry Men
3	Frasier
3	Seinfeld
3	The X-Files
2	3rd Rock from the Sun
2	Ally McBeal
2	Chicago Hope
2	Don King: Only in America
2	Ellen
2	Mad About You
2	Miss Evers' Boys
2	NYPD Blue
2	The Odyssey
2	Spin City
2	Touched by an Angel

The following programs received multiple wins:

Wins	Title
2	Ally McBeal
2	George Wallace

== Ceremony ==
=== Presenters ===
- Gillian Anderson
- Lauren Bacall
- Alec Baldwin
- Antonio Banderas
- Brenda Blethyn
- Minnie Driver
- David Duchovny
- Faye Dunaway
- Michael J. Fox
- Brendan Fraser
- Jeff Goldblum
- Anne Heche
- Gregory Hines
- Matt LeBlanc
- Madonna
- Edward Norton
- Michelle Pfeiffer
- Jada Pinkett Smith
- Alan Rickman
- Laura San Giacomo
- Cybill Shepherd
- Kevin Spacey

Presenters	Accolade
Jada Pinkett Smith Alan Rickman	Co-Present Best Performance by an Actor in a Miniseries or Television Movie
Michelle Pfeiffer	Presents Best Motion Picture — Drama
Goldie Hawn	Presents the Cecil B. DeMille Award to recipient Shirley MacLaine
Brenda Blethyn	Presents Best Performance by an Actor in a Motion Picture — Drama
David Duchovny Gillian Anderson	Co-Present Best Performance by an Actor in a Television Series — Comedy or Musical
Edward Norton	Presents Best Performance by a Supporting Actress in a Motion Picture
Madonna	Presents Best Performance by an Actor in a Motion Picture — Comedy or Musical
Laura San Giacomo Michael J. Fox	Co-Present Best Performance by an Actress in a Television Series — Drama
David Duchovny Gillian Anderson	Co-Present Best Performance by an Actress in a Television Series — Comedy or Musical
Lauren Bacall	Presents Best Performance by a Supporting Actor in a Motion Picture
Anne Heche Alec Baldwin	Co-Present Best Screenplay
Laura San Giacomo Michael J. Fox	Co-Present Best Performance by an Actor in a Television Series — Drama
Minnie Driver Brendan Fraser	Co-Present Best Performance by a Supporting Actress in a Series, Miniseries or Motion Picture Made for Television
Jada Smith Alan Rickman	Co-Present Best Performance by a Supporting Actor in a Series, Miniseries or Motion Picture Made for Television
Antonio Banderas	Presents Best Actress in a Motion Picture — Comedy or Musical

=== Cecil B. DeMille Award ===
Shirley MacLaine

=== Miss Golden Globe ===
Clementine Ford (daughter of Cybill Shepherd & David M. Ford)

== Awards breakdown ==
The following networks received multiple nominations:

Nominations	Network
23	NBC
9	ABC
6	CBS
6	Fox
5	TNT
4	HBO
4	Showtime

The following networks received multiple wins:

Wins	Network
2	Fox
2	TNT

== Memorable ceremony moments ==
The ceremony at the Beverly Hilton was notable for two memorable moments. First, when Christine Lahti was announced as the winner of Best Actress in a Television Drama, she was in the restroom and came out a few minutes later to accept. Also, after winning Best Actor in a Movie or Miniseries, Ving Rhames brought fellow nominee Jack Lemmon on stage to give his award to the elder actor.

== See also ==
- 70th Academy Awards
- 18th Golden Raspberry Awards
- 4th Screen Actors Guild Awards
- 49th Primetime Emmy Awards
- 50th Primetime Emmy Awards
- 51st British Academy Film Awards
- 52nd Tony Awards
- 1997 in film
- 1997 in American television
