= Descending Angel =

- Genre: Drama; Thriller; War
- Teleplay by: Robert J. Seigel; Grace Woodard; Alan Sharp
- Story by: Robert J. Seigel; Grace Woodard
- Directed by: Jeremy Kagan
- Starring: George C. Scott; Diane Lane; Eric Roberts
- Music by: James Newton Howard
- Country of origin: United States
- Original language: English

Production
- Producer: Freyda Rothstein
- Production locations: 952 Green Valley Crescent, Ottawa, Ontario; Montreal
- Cinematography: Lajos Koltai
- Running time: 98 minutes
- Production company: HBO Pictures

Original release
- Network: HBO
- Release: November 25, 1990

Descending Angel is a 1990 television film that aired on HBO starring George C. Scott, Diane Lane and Eric Roberts.

== Plot ==
A recently engaged man (Roberts) comes to visit his fiancée (Lane)'s father (Scott) and gets to know him better, when he unearths clues that the man may have been a Nazi collaborator and mass murderer.

Michael is repeatedly accosted on the street by Bercovici, who claims that he is a survivor of the massacre in Romania that Florian took part in. Michael seeks comfort in the apparently benevolent advice of Bishop Dancu, who takes Michael into the bowels of the church to show him a "secret report" that Florian had been investigated and cleared by the FBI.

Looking up Sam Murray, the reporter who wrote old expose' stories on Florian; Michael discovers he had been brutally beaten and crippled by unknown assailants. Murray snorts that ex-Nazi's had an easy time getting into America after WW2 as long as they claimed they were "Anti-Communist", citing scientist Wernher Von Braun as an example.

Michael also discovers that Florian's wife (Irina's mother) had discovered the truth and Florian had her placed in a mental institution; where she eventually committed suicide.

Irina, who had been told her Mother deserted the family, refuses to accept the truth. Hoping to convince her, Michael uses the cover of a church meeting to break into Bishop Dancu's file room to search for evidence; with Sam Murray as getaway driver.

Michael is discovered, and armed bodyguards fire at him; hitting and killing Irina. The police arrive and arrest the bodyguards. Florian, even if he escapes prison, has experienced something even his tiny conscience cannot ignore.

== Cast ==
- George C. Scott as Florian Stroia
- Diane Lane as Irina Stroia
- Eric Roberts as Michael Rossi
- Mark Margolis as Bercovici
- Vyto Ruginis as Glenn
- Amy Aquino as Catherine
- Ken Jenkins as Sam Murray
- Elsa Raven as Vera
- Richard Jenkins as Debaudt
- Jan Rubeš as Bishop Dancu
- Philip Akin as Bookstore Clerk
