= 12 Angry Men (1997 film) =

1997 television film directed by William Friedkin

- DVD cover
- Genre: Drama
- Based on: Twelve Angry Men; 1954 teleplay by Reginald Rose
- Written by: Reginald Rose
- Directed by: William Friedkin
- Starring: Courtney B. Vance; Ossie Davis; George C. Scott; Armin Mueller-Stahl; Dorian Harewood; James Gandolfini; Tony Danza; Jack Lemmon; Hume Cronyn; Mykelti Williamson; Edward James Olmos; William Petersen
- Country of origin: United States
- Original language: English

Production
- Producer: Terence A. Donnelly
- Production locations: Raleigh Studios - 5300 Melrose Avenue, Hollywood, Los Angeles; D.C. Stages, 1360 East 6th Street, Downtown, Los Angeles
- Cinematography: Fred Schuler
- Editor: Augie Hess
- Running time: 117 minutes
- Production company: MGM Television
- Budget: $1.75 million

Original release
- Network: Showtime
- Release: August 17, 1997

12 Angry Men is a 1997 American made-for-television legal drama film directed by William Friedkin, adapted by Reginald Rose from his original 1954 teleplay of the same title. It is a remake of the 1957 film of the same name. The film aired on August 17, 1997 on Showtime.

== Plot ==
In the murder trial of a teenage boy from a slum who is accused of murdering his father, the judge instructs the jury to determine his guilt or innocence. The verdict must be unanimous, and a finding of guilt may result in the death penalty, unlike in the 1957 film, in which it is mandatory. The jury of twelve retires to the jury room.

An initial vote is taken and eleven jurors vote for conviction. Juror 8, an architect and the lone dissenter, states that the evidence is circumstantial and the defendant deserves a fair deliberation. He questions the testimony of the two witnesses, and the fact that the switchblade used in the murder is not as unusual as the testimony indicates, producing an identical knife from his pocket.

Juror 8 proposes another vote by secret ballot. If the other jurors vote guilty unanimously, he will acquiesce, but if at least one votes "not guilty", they will continue deliberating. Only Juror 9, the oldest, changes his vote, respecting Juror 8's motives and feeling his points deserve further discussion.

After deliberating whether one witness actually heard the murder take place, Juror 5, who grew up in a slum, changes his vote. Juror 11, a European watchmaker, questioning whether the defendant would have fled the scene and returned three hours later to retrieve his knife, also changes his vote. Jurors 2 and 6 also vote "not guilty", tying the verdict at 6-6, after Juror 8 demonstrates the unlikelihood that one witness actually saw the boy flee the scene. The remaining jurors are intrigued when Juror 11 proves that although a psychiatric test stated that the defendant had subconscious desires to kill, such tests only offer possible actions. Juror 7, impatient to attend a baseball game that night, changes his vote, but Juror 11 chastises him for changing his vote so casually and selfishly when the boy's life is on the line. When pressed by Juror 11, Juror 7 eventually states that he doubts the boy is guilty.

Juror 12, a quiet advertising executive, and Juror 1, the jury foreman and a high school football coach, change their votes, leaving Jurors 3, 4, and 10 as the only dissenters. Outraged at the proceedings, Juror 10 goes on a bigoted diatribe against Hispanic immigrants "outbreeding" African-Americans. He attempts to leverage this with the other African-American jurors, offending the rest of the jury, until Juror 4 orders him to be quiet for the rest of the proceedings.

Juror 4 states that despite all the other evidence called into question, the testimony of the woman who saw the murder from across the street stands as solid evidence. Juror 12 changes his vote back to "guilty", making the vote 8–4 again. Juror 9, seeing Juror 4 rub the impressions left by his glasses on his nose, realizes that the witness had similar impressions, indicating that she wore glasses and likely was not wearing them when she saw the murder. Jurors 12 and 4 change their vote to "not guilty". Juror 10, who says he still thinks the defendant is guilty, bluntly admits to no longer caring about the verdict and votes for acquittal.

Undeterred, Juror 3 is forced to present his arguments again, and goes on a tirade, presenting the evidence in haphazard fashion and concluding with his disbelief that a son would kill his own father, mirroring his previous comments about his bad relationship with his own son. He begins to cry, and says he can feel the knife being plunged into his chest. Juror 8 gently points out that the boy is not his son, and Juror 4 quietly persuades him to let the boy live. Juror 3 gives in, and the final vote is unanimous for acquittal.

The jurors leave and the defendant is found not guilty off-screen, while Juror 8 helps the distraught Juror 3 with his coat. Before departing the court, Juror 8 introduces himself as Davis and Juror 9 as McCardle, and the two part ways.

== Cast ==
=== The Jury ===
Juror No.	Character	Actor	'Not guilty' order
1	Jury foreman; a high school football coach who tries to keep order amid the hostilities between the jurors.	Courtney B. Vance	9
2	A meek bank teller who initially does not know what to make of the case.	Ossie Davis	5
3	A businessman with a hot temper. He is estranged from his son and is convinced that the defendant is guilty.	George C. Scott	12
4	A German-accented stockbroker; he is very eloquent and considers the case through facts and not bias.	Armin Mueller-Stahl	11
5	A health care worker (possibly an EMT) who grew up in the Harlem slums. A Milwaukee Brewers fan.	Dorian Harewood	3
6	A house painter who considers himself unintellectual. Patient and respectful of others' opinions, he feels very strongly about respecting one's elders.	James Gandolfini	6
7	A salesman and baseball fanatic; unconcerned with the trial, he is impatient, rude, and wise-cracking. He is anxious to have jury duty end since he has tickets to a New York Yankees game.	Tony Danza	7
8	Davis; an architect who has two children. He is the only juror to originally vote not guilty, and repeatedly questions the evidence of the case.	Jack Lemmon	1
9	McCardle; a wise man, the eldest in the room, who is the first to side with Juror 8.	Hume Cronyn	2
10	A carwash owner and former Nation of Islam member, he is loudmouthed, narrow-minded, and a black supremacist.	Mykelti Williamson	10
11	A European immigrant watchmaker; he is observant and believes in the American justice system.	Edward James Olmos	4
12	An ad executive; he is easily swayed by others' opinions, and does not have a full understanding of the life at stake.	William Petersen	8

=== Others ===
- Mary McDonnell as Judge Cynthia Nance
- Tyrees Allen as The Guard
- Douglas Spain as The Defendant

== Reception ==
The film holds a 93% 'Fresh' score on review aggregator Rotten Tomatoes, based on 15 critic reviews with an average rating of 7.2/10.

== Awards and nominations ==
Year	Award	Category	Nominee(s)	Result	Ref.
1997	CableACE Awards	Movie		Nominated	
1997	CableACE Awards	Supporting Actor in a Movie or Miniseries	George C. Scott	Won	
1997	CableACE Awards	Writing a Movie or Miniseries	Reginald Rose	Nominated	
1997	CableACE Awards	Editing a Dramatic Special or Series/Movie or Miniseries	Augie Hess	Nominated	
1998	ALMA Awards	Outstanding Individual Performance in a Made-for-Television Movie or Mini-Series in a Crossover Role	Edward James Olmos	Won	
1998	Artios Awards	Outstanding Achievement in Casting – Movie of the Week Casting	Mary Jo Slater	Nominated	
1998	Directors Guild of America Awards	Outstanding Directorial Achievement in Dramatic Specials	William Friedkin	Nominated	
1998	Golden Globe Awards	Best Miniseries or Motion Picture Made for Television		Nominated	
1998	Golden Globe Awards	Best Actor in a Miniseries or Motion Picture Made for Television	Jack Lemmon	Nominated	
1998	Golden Globe Awards	Best Supporting Actor in a Series, Miniseries or Motion Picture Made for Television	George C. Scott	Won	
1998	Online Film & Television Association Awards	Best Motion Picture Made for Television		Won	
1998	Online Film & Television Association Awards	Best Actor in a Motion Picture or Miniseries	Jack Lemmon	Nominated	
1998	Online Film & Television Association Awards	Best Supporting Actor in a Motion Picture or Miniseries	Hume Cronyn	Nominated	
1998	Online Film & Television Association Awards	Best Supporting Actor in a Motion Picture or Miniseries	Armin Mueller-Stahl	Nominated	
1998	Online Film & Television Association Awards	Best Supporting Actor in a Motion Picture or Miniseries	George C. Scott	Nominated	
1998	Online Film & Television Association Awards	Best Supporting Actor in a Motion Picture or Miniseries	Courtney B. Vance	Nominated	
1998	Online Film & Television Association Awards	Best Direction of a Motion Picture or Miniseries	William Friedkin	Nominated	
1998	Online Film & Television Association Awards	Best Ensemble in a Motion Picture or Miniseries		Won	
1998	Online Film & Television Association Awards	Best Editing in a Motion Picture or Miniseries		Nominated	
1998	Online Film & Television Association Awards	Best Music in a Motion Picture or Miniseries	Charlie Haden and Kenyon Hopkins	Nominated	
1998	Online Film & Television Association Awards	Best New Theme Song in a Motion Picture or Miniseries	Kenyon Hopkins	Nominated	
1998	Primetime Emmy Awards	Outstanding Television Movie	Terence A. Donnelly	Nominated	
1998	Primetime Emmy Awards	Outstanding Lead Actor in a Miniseries or a Movie	Jack Lemmon	Nominated	
1998	Primetime Emmy Awards	Outstanding Supporting Actor in a Miniseries or a Movie	Hume Cronyn	Nominated	
1998	Primetime Emmy Awards	Outstanding Supporting Actor in a Miniseries or a Movie	George C. Scott	Won	
1998	Primetime Emmy Awards	Outstanding Directing for a Miniseries or a Movie	William Friedkin	Nominated	
1998	Primetime Emmy Awards	Outstanding Sound Mixing for a Drama Miniseries or a Movie	Russell Williams II, David E. Fluhr, and Adam Jenkins	Won	
1998	Screen Actors Guild Awards	Outstanding Performance by a Male Actor in a Miniseries or Television Movie	Jack Lemmon	Nominated	
1998	Screen Actors Guild Awards	Outstanding Performance by a Male Actor in a Miniseries or Television Movie	George C. Scott	Nominated	

At the Golden Globe Awards, actor Ving Rhames won the award for Best Actor – Miniseries or Television Film for his performance in Don King: Only in America. When presented with the award, he summoned Jack Lemmon on to the stage and gifted the award to him, feeling that Lemmon was more deserving of it. Rhames refused to re-accept the award when Lemmon tried to return it to him, meaning that, although Lemmon didn't officially win the Golden Globe Award, he did receive the trophy.

== Notes ==
- Friedkin, William, The Friedkin Connection, HarperCollins 2013
