= 4th Screen Actors Guild Awards =

- Awarded for: Outstanding motion picture and primetime television performances
- Date: March 8, 1998
- Location: Shrine Auditorium; Los Angeles, California
- Country: United States
- Presented by: Screen Actors Guild
- Website: www.sagawards.org

Television/radio coverage
- Network: TNT

The 4th Screen Actors Guild Awards, awarded by the Screen Actors Guild and honoring the best achievements in film and television performances for the year 1997, took place on March 8, 1998. The ceremony was held at the Shrine Exposition Center in Los Angeles, California, and was televised live by TNT.

The nominees were announced on January 27, 1998, by Melissa Joan Hart and David Paymer.

== Winners and nominees ==
Winners are listed first and highlighted in boldface.

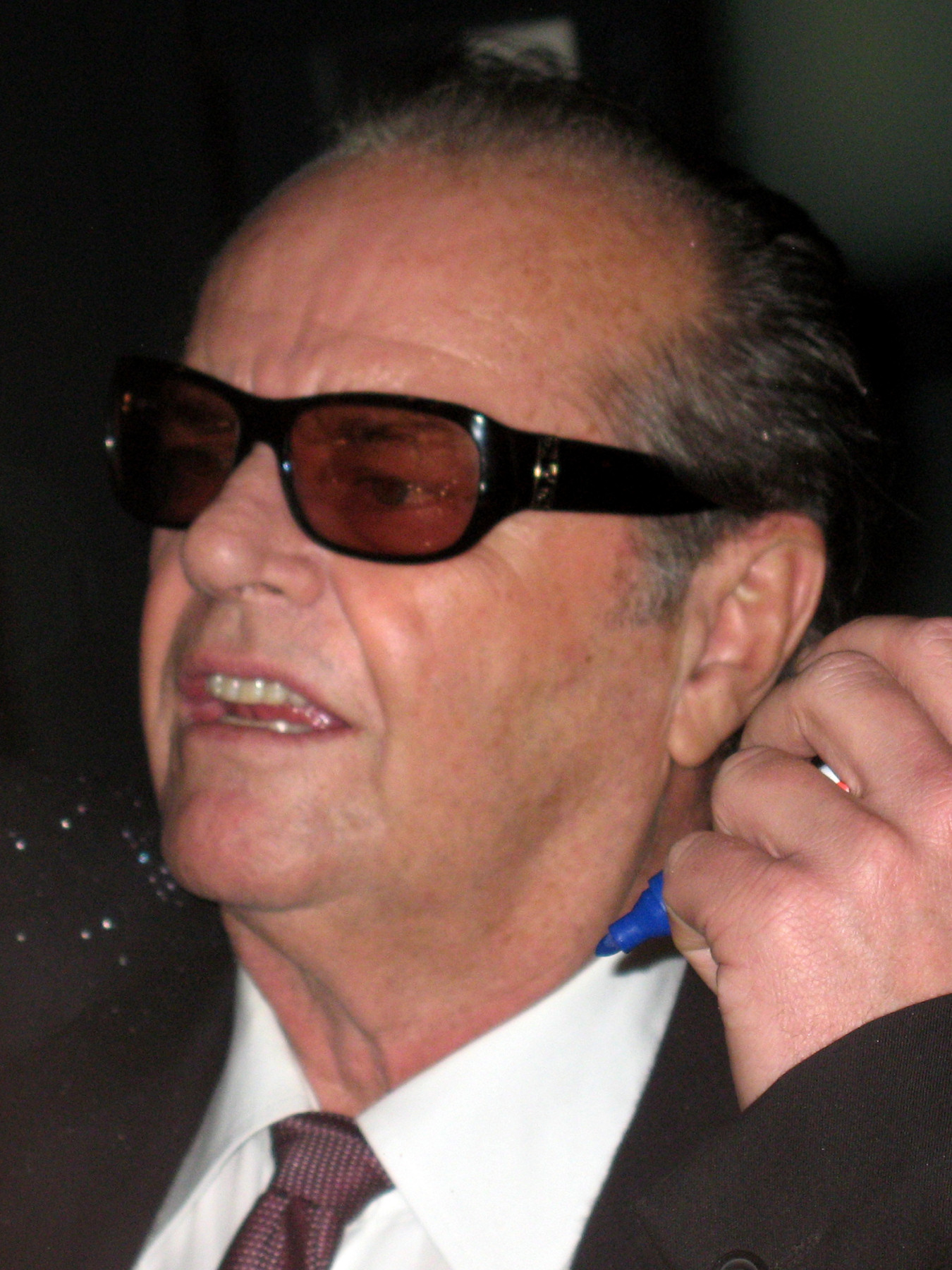
Jack Nicholson, Outstanding Performance by a Male Actor in a Leading Role winner

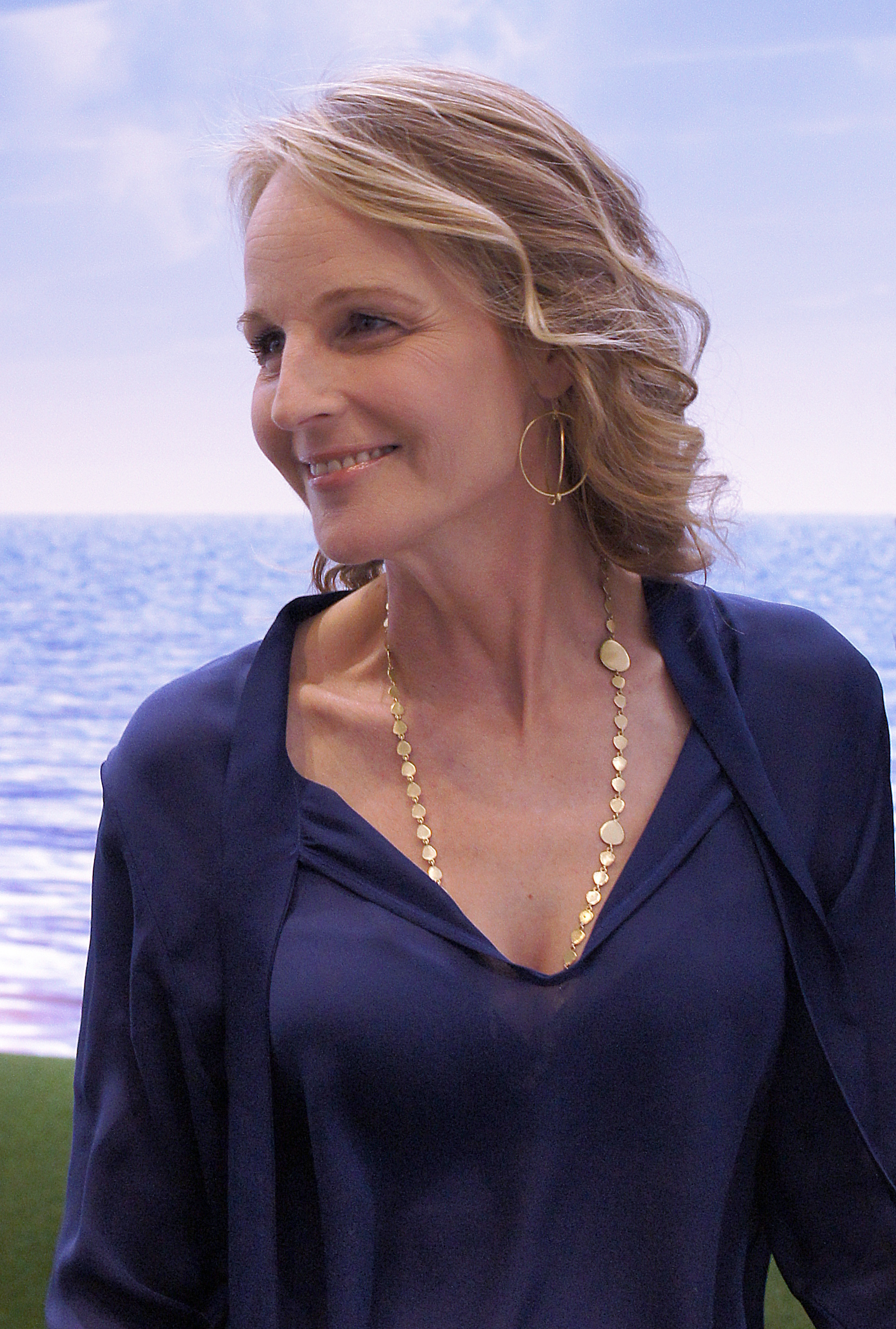
Helen Hunt, Outstanding Performance by a Female Actor in a Leading Role winner

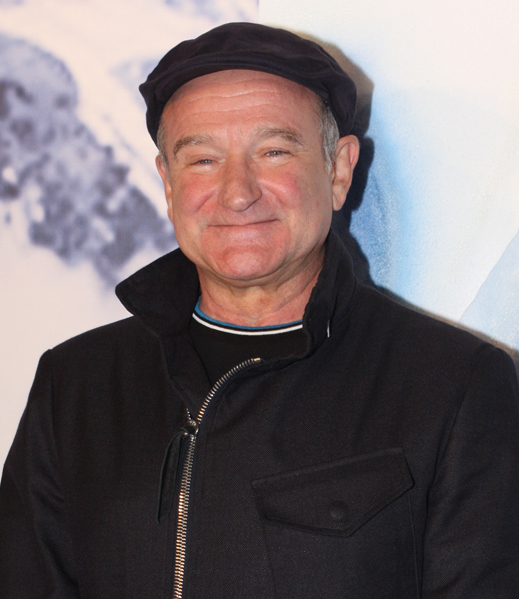
Robin Williams, Outstanding Performance by a Male Actor in a Supporting Role winner

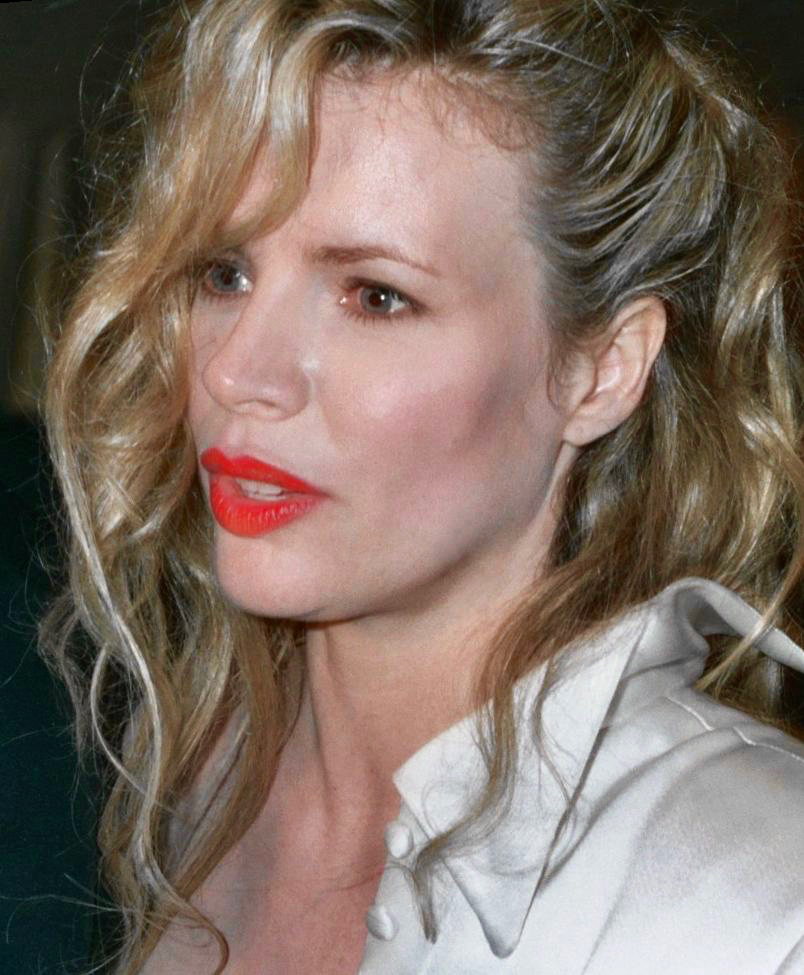
Kim Basinger, Outstanding Performance by a Female Actor in a Supporting Role co-winner

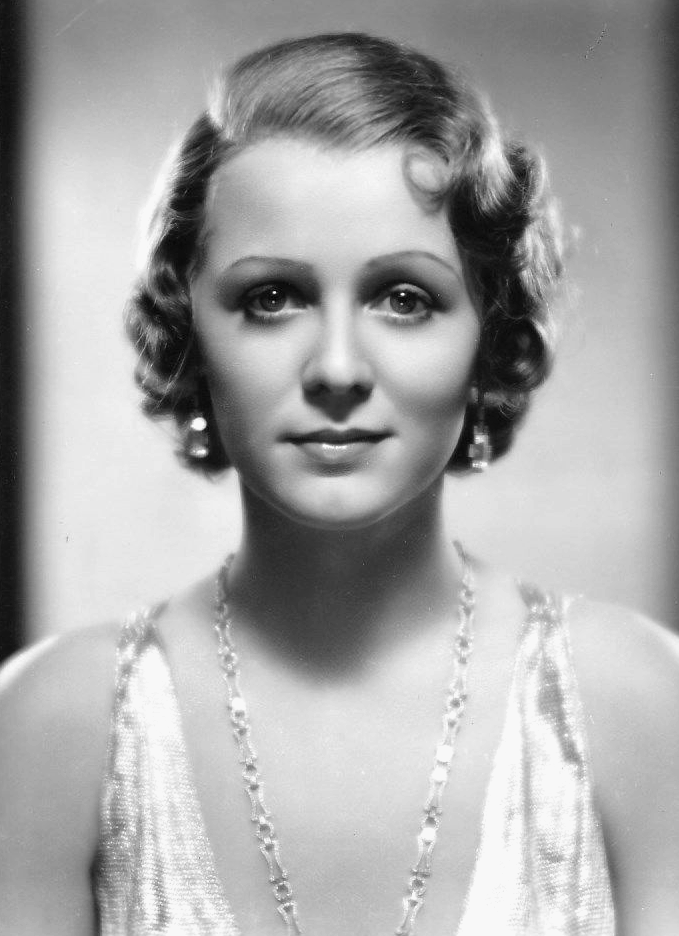
Gloria Stuart, Outstanding Performance by a Female Actor in a Supporting Role co-winner

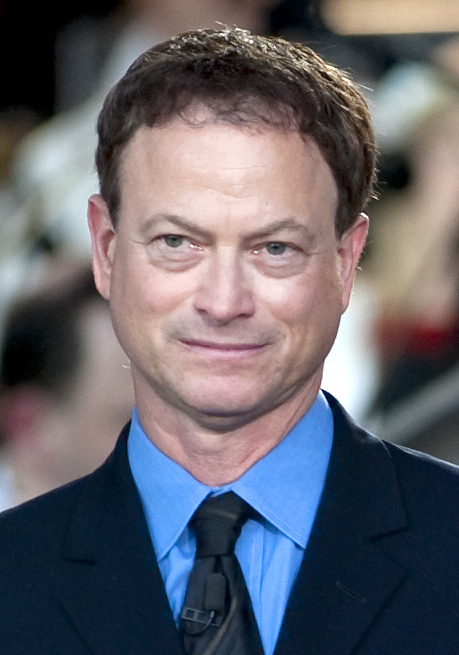
Gary Sinise, Outstanding Performance by a Male Actor in a Miniseries or Television Movie winner

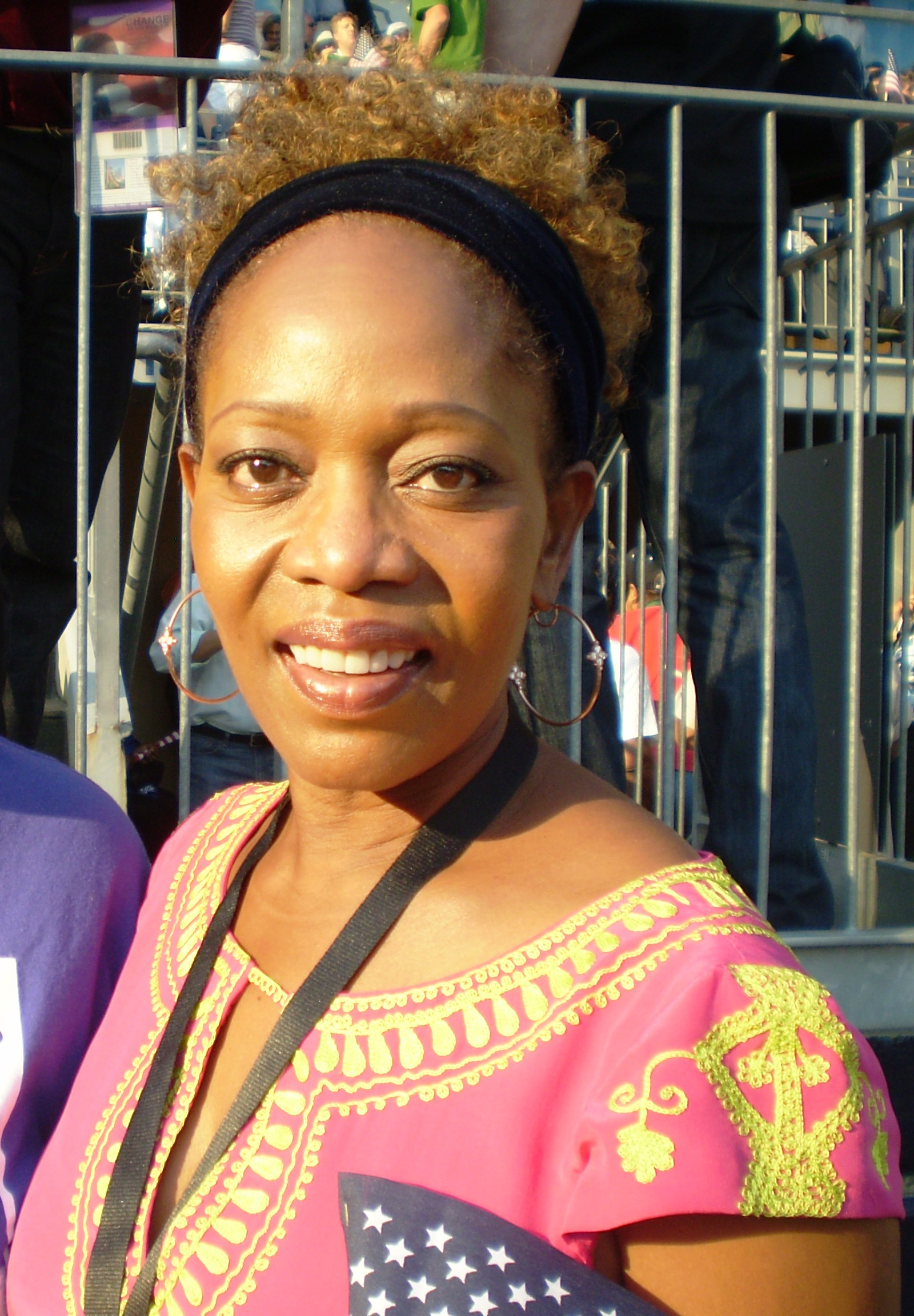
Alfre Woodard, Outstanding Performance by a Female Actor in a Miniseries or Television Movie winner

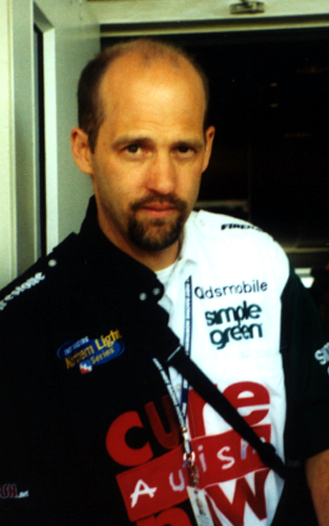
Anthony Edwards, Outstanding Performance by a Male Actor in a Drama Series winner

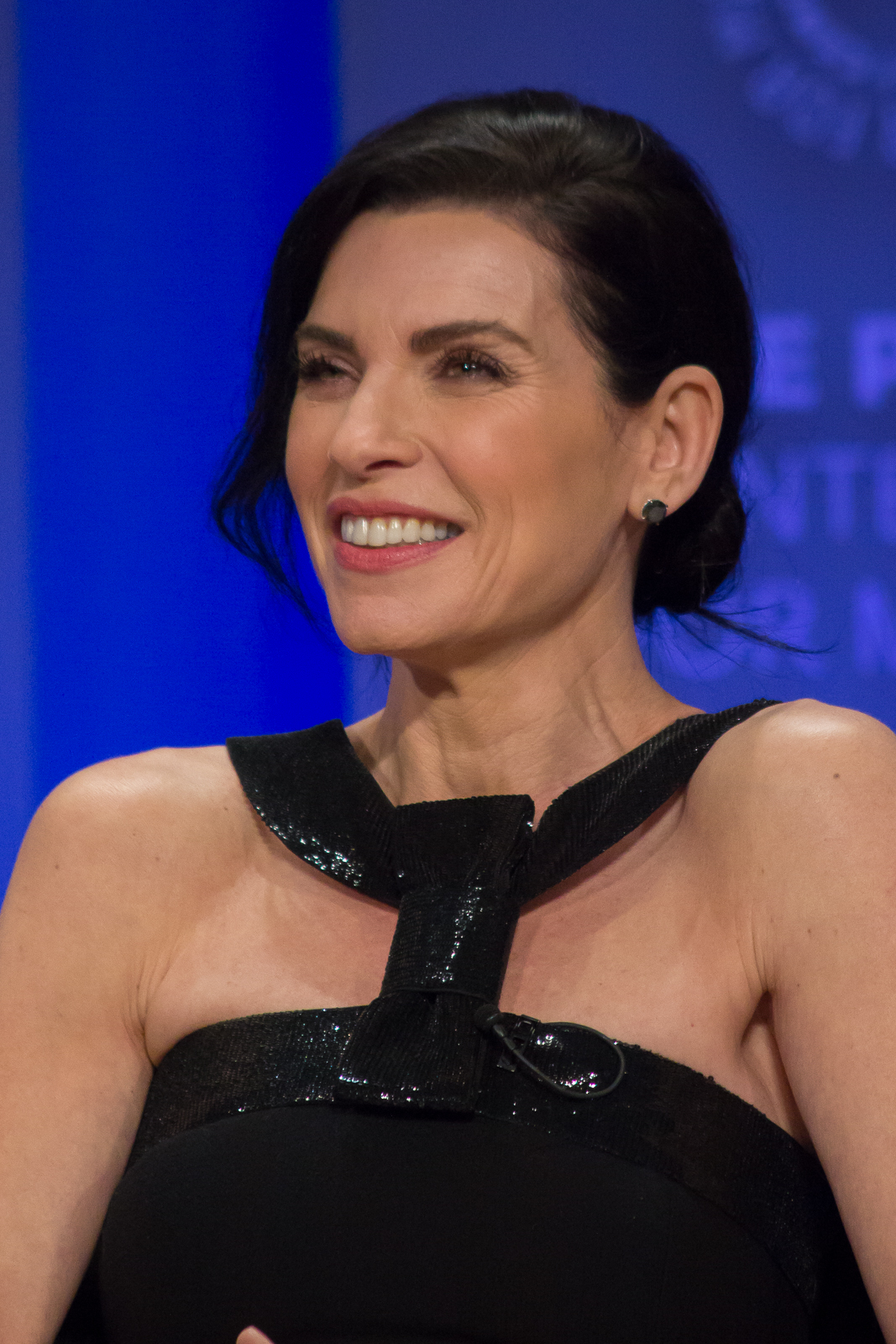
Julianna Margulies, Outstanding Performance by a Female Actor in a Drama Series winner

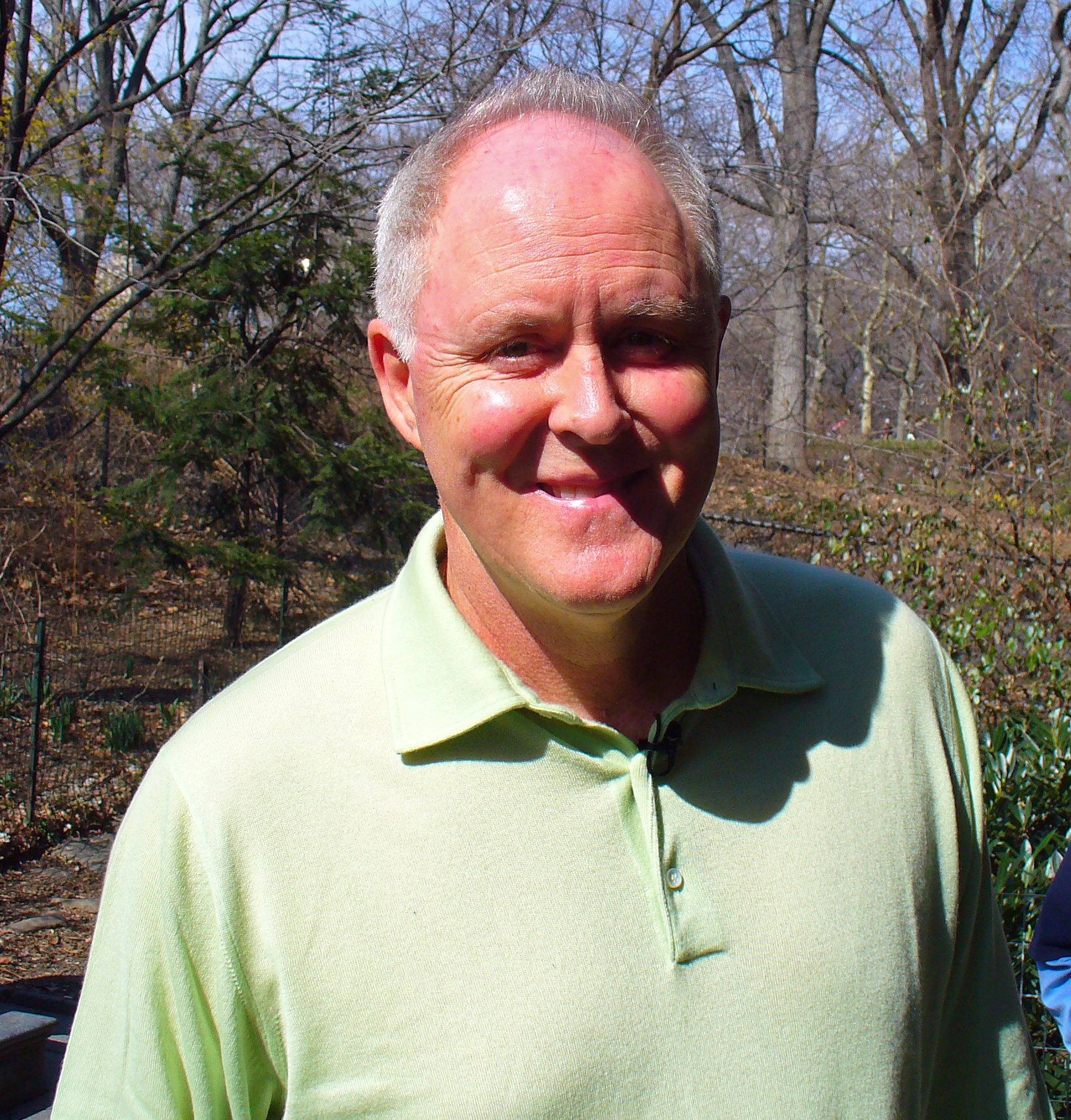
John Lithgow, Outstanding Performance by a Male Actor in a Comedy Series winner

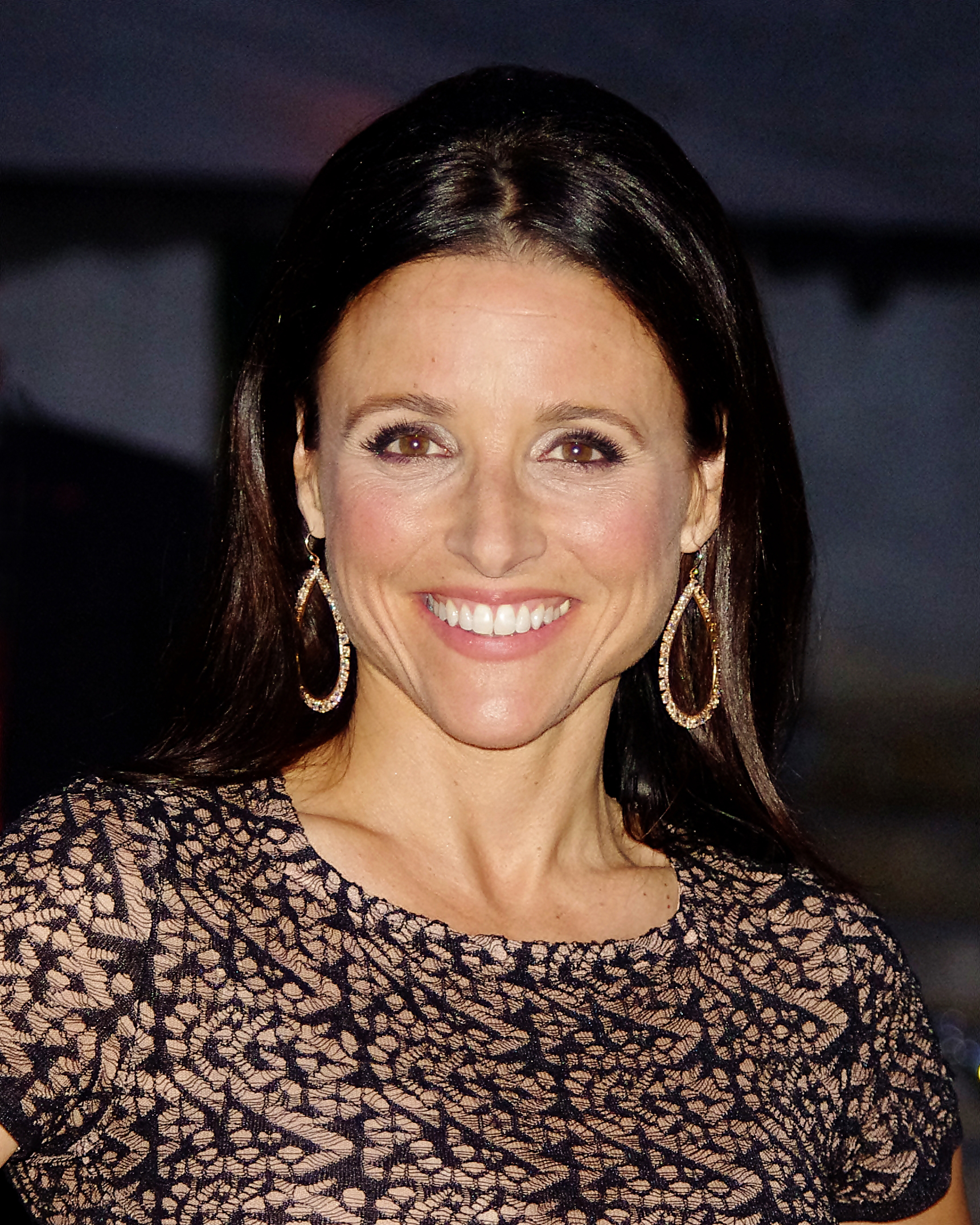
Julia Louis-Dreyfus, Outstanding Performance by a Female Actor in a Comedy Series winner

=== Film ===
Outstanding Performance by a Male Actor in a Leading Role	Outstanding Performance by a Female Actor in a Leading Role
**Jack Nicholson – As Good as It Gets as Melvin Udall**; Matt Damon – Good Will Hunting as Will Hunting; Robert Duvall – The Apostle as Euliss "Sonny" Dewey / The Apostle E.F.; Peter Fonda – Ulee's Gold as Ulee Jackson; Dustin Hoffman – Wag the Dog as Stanley Motss	**Helen Hunt – As Good as It Gets as Carol Connelly**; Helena Bonham Carter – The Wings of the Dove as Kate Croy; Judi Dench – Mrs Brown as Queen Victoria; Pam Grier – Jackie Brown as Jackie Brown; Kate Winslet – Titanic as Rose DeWitt Bukater; Robin Wright – She's So Lovely as Maureen Murphy Quinn
Outstanding Performance by a Male Actor in a Supporting Role	Outstanding Performance by a Female Actor in a Supporting Role
**Robin Williams – Good Will Hunting as Dr. Sean Maguire**; Billy Connolly – Mrs Brown as John Brown; Anthony Hopkins – Amistad as John Quincy Adams; Greg Kinnear – As Good as It Gets as Simon Bishop; Burt Reynolds – Boogie Nights as Jack Horner	**Kim Basinger – L.A. Confidential as Lynn Bracken**; **Gloria Stuart – Titanic as Rose Dawson Calvert**; Minnie Driver – Good Will Hunting as Skylar; Alison Elliott – The Wings of the Dove as Milly Theale; Julianne Moore – Boogie Nights as Amber Waves
Outstanding Performance by a Cast in a Motion Picture
**The Full Monty – Mark Addy, Paul Barber, Robert Carlyle, Deirdre Costello, Steve Huison, Bruce Jones, Lesley Sharp, William Snape, Hugo Speer, Tom Wilkinson, and Emily Woof**; Boogie Nights – Don Cheadle, Heather Graham, Luis Guzmán, Philip Baker Hall, Philip Seymour Hoffman, Thomas Jane, Ricky Jay, William H. Macy, Alfred Molina, Julianne Moore, Nicole Ari Parker, John C. Reilly, Burt Reynolds, Robert Ridgely, Mark Wahlberg, and Melora Walters; Good Will Hunting – Ben Affleck, Matt Damon, Minnie Driver, Stellan Skarsgård, and Robin Williams; L.A. Confidential – Kim Basinger, James Cromwell, Russell Crowe, Danny DeVito, Guy Pearce, Kevin Spacey, and David Strathairn; Titanic – Suzy Amis, Kathy Bates, Leonardo DiCaprio, Frances Fisher, Bernard Fox, Victor Garber, Bernard Hill, Jonathan Hyde, Danny Nucci, Bill Paxton, Gloria Stuart, David Warner, Kate Winslet, and Billy Zane

=== Television ===
Outstanding Performance by a Male Actor in a Miniseries or Television Movie	Outstanding Performance by a Female Actor in a Miniseries or Television Movie
**Gary Sinise – George Wallace as George Wallace**; Jack Lemmon – 12 Angry Men as Juror #8; Sidney Poitier – Mandela and de Klerk as Nelson Mandela; Ving Rhames – Don King: Only in America as Don King; George C. Scott – 12 Angry Men as Juror #3	**Alfre Woodard – Miss Evers' Boys as Eunice Rivers Laurie**; Glenn Close – In the Gloaming as Janet; Faye Dunaway – The Twilight of the Golds as Phyllis Gold; Sigourney Weaver – Snow White: A Tale of Terror as Lady Claudia Hoffman; Mare Winningham – George Wallace as Lurleen Wallace
Outstanding Performance by a Male Actor in a Drama Series	Outstanding Performance by a Female Actor in a Drama Series
**Anthony Edwards – ER as Mark Greene**; David Duchovny – The X-Files as Fox Mulder; Dennis Franz – NYPD Blue as Andy Sipowicz; Jimmy Smits – NYPD Blue as Bobby Simone; Sam Waterston – Law & Order as Jack McCoy	**Julianna Margulies – ER as Carol Hathaway**; Gillian Anderson – The X-Files as Dana Scully; Kim Delaney – NYPD Blue as Diane Russell; Christine Lahti – Chicago Hope as Kathryn Austin; Della Reese – Touched by an Angel as Tess
Outstanding Performance by a Male Actor in a Comedy Series	Outstanding Performance by a Female Actor in a Comedy Series
**John Lithgow – 3rd Rock from the Sun as Dick Solomon**; Jason Alexander – Seinfeld as George Costanza; Kelsey Grammer – Frasier as Frasier Crane; David Hyde Pierce – Frasier as Niles Crane; Michael Richards – Seinfeld as Cosmo Kramer	**Julia Louis-Dreyfus – Seinfeld as Elaine Benes**; Kirstie Alley – Veronica's Closet as Veronica "Ronnie" Chase; Ellen DeGeneres – Ellen as Ellen Morgan; Calista Flockhart – Ally McBeal as Ally McBeal; Helen Hunt – Mad About You as Jamie Buchman
Outstanding Performance by an Ensemble in a Drama Series
**ER – Maria Bello, George Clooney, Anthony Edwards, Laura Innes, Alex Kingston, Eriq La Salle, Julianna Margulies, Gloria Reuben, and Noah Wyle**; Chicago Hope – Adam Arkin, Peter Berg, Jayne Brook, Rocky Carroll, Vondie Curtis-Hall, Stacy Edwards, Hector Elizondo, Mark Harmon, and Christine Lahti; Law & Order – Benjamin Bratt, Steven Hill, Carey Lowell, S. Epatha Merkerson, Jerry Orbach, and Sam Waterston; NYPD Blue – Gordon Clapp, Kim Delaney, Dennis Franz, James McDaniel, Jimmy Smits, Andrea Thompson, and Nicholas Turturro; The X-Files – Gillian Anderson, William B. Davis, David Duchovny, and Mitch Pileggi
Outstanding Performance by an Ensemble in a Comedy Series
**Seinfeld – Jason Alexander, Julia Louis-Dreyfus, Michael Richards, and Jerry Seinfeld**; 3rd Rock from the Sun – Jane Curtin, Joseph Gordon-Levitt, Kristen Johnston, Simbi Khali, Wayne Knight, John Lithgow, French Stewart, and Elmarie Wendel; Ally McBeal – Gil Bellows, Lisa Nicole Carson, Calista Flockhart, Greg Germann, Jane Krakowski, and Courtney Thorne-Smith; Frasier – Dan Butler, Peri Gilpin, Kelsey Grammer, Jane Leeves, John Mahoney, and David Hyde Pierce; Mad About You – Robin Bartlett, Cynthia Harris, Helen Hunt, Leila Kenzle, John Pankow, Paul Reiser, and Louis Zorich

=== Screen Actors Guild Life Achievement Award ===
- Elizabeth Taylor

== Multiple nominations ==
=== Film ===
Nominations	Film
4	Good Will Hunting
3	As Good as It Gets
3	Boogie Nights
3	Titanic
2	L.A. Confidential
2	Mrs Brown
2	The Wings of the Dove

=== Television ===
Nominations	Program
4	NYPD Blue
4	Seinfeld
3	ER
3	Frasier
3	The X-Files
2	12 Angry Men
2	3rd Rock from the Sun
2	Ally McBeal
2	Chicago Hope
2	George Wallace
2	Law & Order
2	Mad About You

== Multiple wins ==
=== Film ===
Wins	Film
2	As Good as It Gets

=== Television ===
Wins	Program
3	ER
2	Seinfeld

== In Memoriam ==
Gloria Stuart presented this segment in which the guild remembered its most famous members who died last year:

- Richard Jaeckel
- Brian Keith
- Jack Lord
- Jack Purvis
- William Hickey
- Audra Lindley
- Ferdy Mayne
- Denver Pyle
- Philip Abbott
- Ted Bessell
- Red Skelton
- Pat Paulsen
- Stubby Kaye
- Chris Farley
- Sonny Bono
- Henny Youngman
- Burgess Meredith
- Paul Lambert
- Charles Hallahan
- Reid Shelton
- Edward Mulhare
- John Denver
- J. T. Walsh
- Toshiro Mifune
- Jacques Cousteau
- Robert Mitchum
- James Stewart
