= George C. Scott =

American actor (1927–1999)

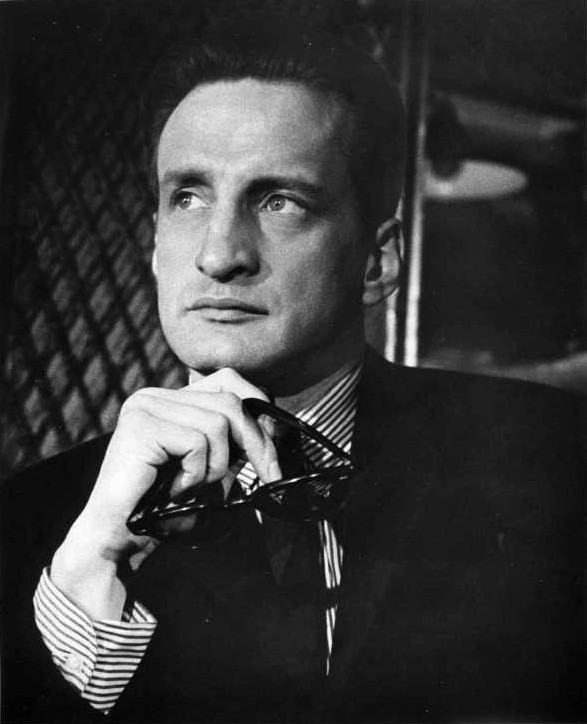
- Scott in The Hustler (1961)
- Born: George Campbell Scott; October 18, 1927; Wise, Virginia, U.S.
- Died: September 22, 1999 (aged 71); Westlake Village, California, U.S.
- Resting place: Westwood Village Memorial Park Cemetery
- Education: University of Missouri (BA)
- Occupations: Actor; director; producer
- Years active: 1951–1999
- Spouses: Carolyn Hughes (m. 1951; div. 1955); Patricia Reed (m. 1955; div. 1960); Colleen Dewhurst (m. 1960; div. 1965); (m. 1967; div. 1972); Trish Van Devere (m. 1972)
- Children: 7, including Devon and Campbell Scott
- Awards: Full list
- Military career
- Allegiance: United States
- Branch: United States Marine Corps
- Service years: 1945–1949
- Rank: Sergeant

George Campbell Scott (October 18, 1927 – September 22, 1999) was an American actor, with a celebrated career on both stage and screen. With a gruff demeanor and commanding presence, Scott became known for his portrayal of stern but complex authority figures.

Described by The Guardian as "a battler and an actor of rare courage", his roles earned him numerous accolades including two Golden Globes, and two Primetime Emmys as well as nominations for two BAFTA Awards and five Tony Awards. Though he won the Academy Award for Best Actor for playing General George S. Patton in Patton (1970), he became the first actor (Note: Earlier, at the 8th Academy Awards in 1936, screenwriter Dudley Nichols won the Academy Award for Best Adapted Screenplay for The Informer, but refused to accept it until the Academy officially recognized the Screen Writers Guild. Nichols later accepted the award at the 1938 Oscar ceremony.) to decline the award, having warned the Academy of Motion Picture Arts and Sciences months in advance that he would do so on the basis of his belief that performances cannot be compared to others. His other Oscar-nominated roles include Anatomy of a Murder (1959), The Hustler (1961), and The Hospital (1971).

Scott's other notable films include Dr. Strangelove (1964), Petulia (1968), The Day of the Dolphin (1973), Movie Movie (1978), Hardcore (1979), and The Exorcist III (1990).

Scott gained fame for his roles on television earning two Primetime Emmy Awards for his performances in Hallmark Hall of Fame (1971), and 12 Angry Men (1997). He also played leading roles in Jane Eyre (1970), Beauty and the Beast (1976), and A Christmas Carol (1984). Scott continued to maintain a prominent stage career even as his film stardom waned, and by the end of his career he had accrued five Tony nominations for his performances in Comes a Day (1959), The Andersonville Trial (1960), Uncle Vanya (1974), Death of a Salesman (1975), and Inherit the Wind (1996). He directed several of his own films and plays and often collaborated with his wives Colleen Dewhurst and Trish Van Devere.

== Early life and education ==
George Campbell Scott was born on October 18, 1927—the younger of two siblings—in the modest Wise, Virginia, home of his parents, Gerald Dewey Scott (1902–1988) and Helena Agnes (née Slemp; 1904–1935). His mother was the first cousin, once removed, of Republican Congressman C. Bascom Slemp. His maternal grandfather was a local jurist, Judge Campbell Slemp. Scott's mother died just before his eighth birthday, and he was raised by his father, an executive at Buick. Scott's original ambition was to be a writer like his favorite author, F. Scott Fitzgerald. While attending Redford High School in Detroit, he wrote many short stories, none of which were published. He tried on many occasions to write a novel, but never completed one to his own satisfaction.

After high school, Scott enlisted in the United States Marine Corps, serving from 1945 to 1949. He was assigned to 8th and I Barracks in Washington, D.C., and his primary duty was serving as honor guard at military funerals at Arlington National Cemetery. He later said that during his duty at Arlington, "[I] pick[ed] up a solid drinking habit that stayed with me from then on."

Following military service, Scott enrolled at the University of Missouri on the G.I. Bill where he majored in journalism and then became interested in drama. His first public appearance on stage was as the barrister in a university production of Terence Rattigan's The Winslow Boy, directed by H. Donovan Rhynsburger. During rehearsals for that show, he made his first stage appearance—in a student production of Noël Coward's Hands Across the Sea, directed by Jerry V. Tobias. He graduated from the university in 1953 with degrees in English and theater.

== Career ==
=== 1958–1962: Early roles ===
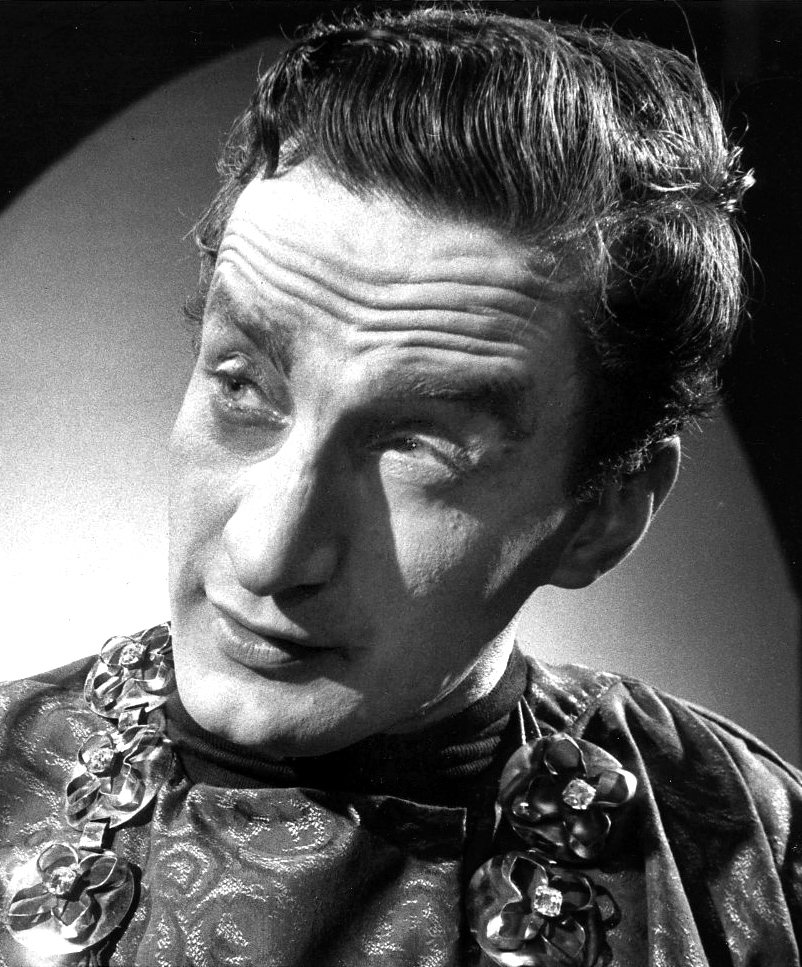
On stage as Richard III, 1958

Scott first rose to prominence for his work with Joseph Papp's New York Shakespeare Festival. In 1958, he won an Obie Award for his performances in Children of Darkness (in which he made the first of many appearances opposite his future wife, actress Colleen Dewhurst), for As You Like It (1958), and for playing the title character in William Shakespeare's Richard III (1957–58) (a performance one critic said was the "angriest" Richard III of all time).

Scott's Broadway debut was in Comes a Day (1958) which had a short run. At the 13th Tony Awards, he was nominated for the Tony Award for Best Featured Actor in a Play.

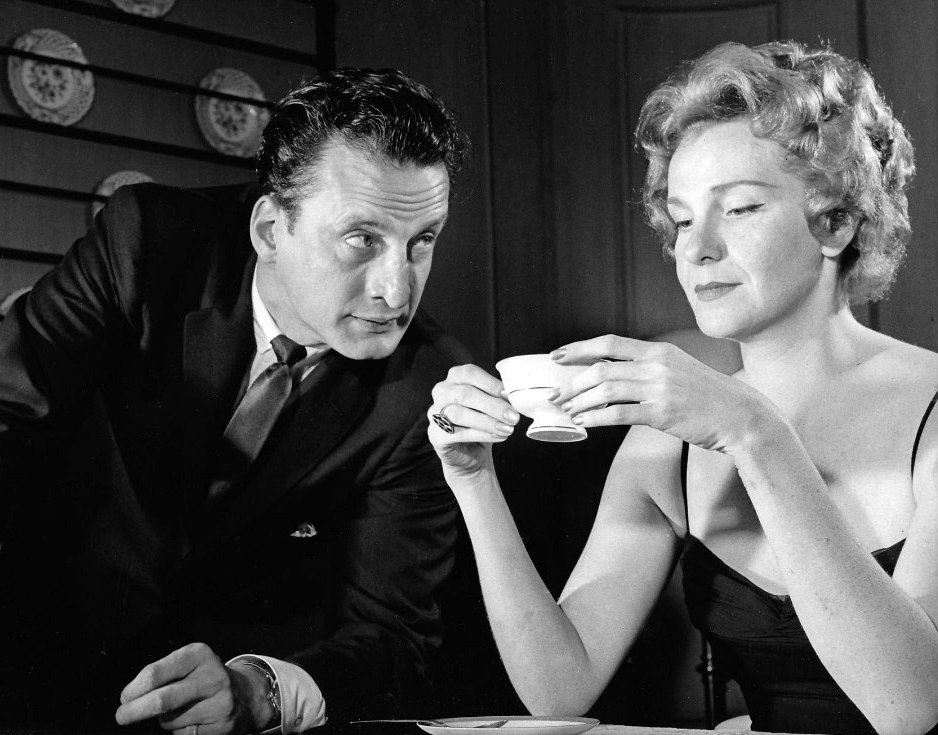
With Geraldine Page (1959) in a publicity still for People Kill People Sometimes

Scott was in much demand for guest shots on TV shows, appearing in episodes of Ben Casey and Naked City. In 1962, Scott appeared as school teacher Arthur Lilly on NBC's The Virginian, in the episode "The Brazen Bell", in which he recites Oscar Wilde's poem "The Ballad of Reading Gaol". That same year, he appeared in NBC's medical drama, The Eleventh Hour, in the episode "I Don't Belong in a White-Painted House". He appeared opposite Laurence Olivier and Julie Harris in Graham Greene's The Power and the Glory in a 1961 television production.

=== 1963–1969: Breakthrough ===
Scott's first leading role in a feature was The List of Adrian Messenger released in 1963. That year, Scott starred in the hour-long television drama series East Side/West Side. He portrayed a New York City social worker, along with co-stars Cicely Tyson and Elizabeth Wilson. Scott was a major creative influence on the show, resulting in conflicts with James T. Aubrey, the head of CBS. The Emmy Award-winning program had a series of guest stars, including James Earl Jones. The portrayal of challenging urban issues made attracting advertisers difficult, not helped by the limited distribution. Not all CBS network affiliates broadcast the show, and it was canceled after one season. Scott had a success during 1963 in an off-Broadway production of Desire Under the Elms.

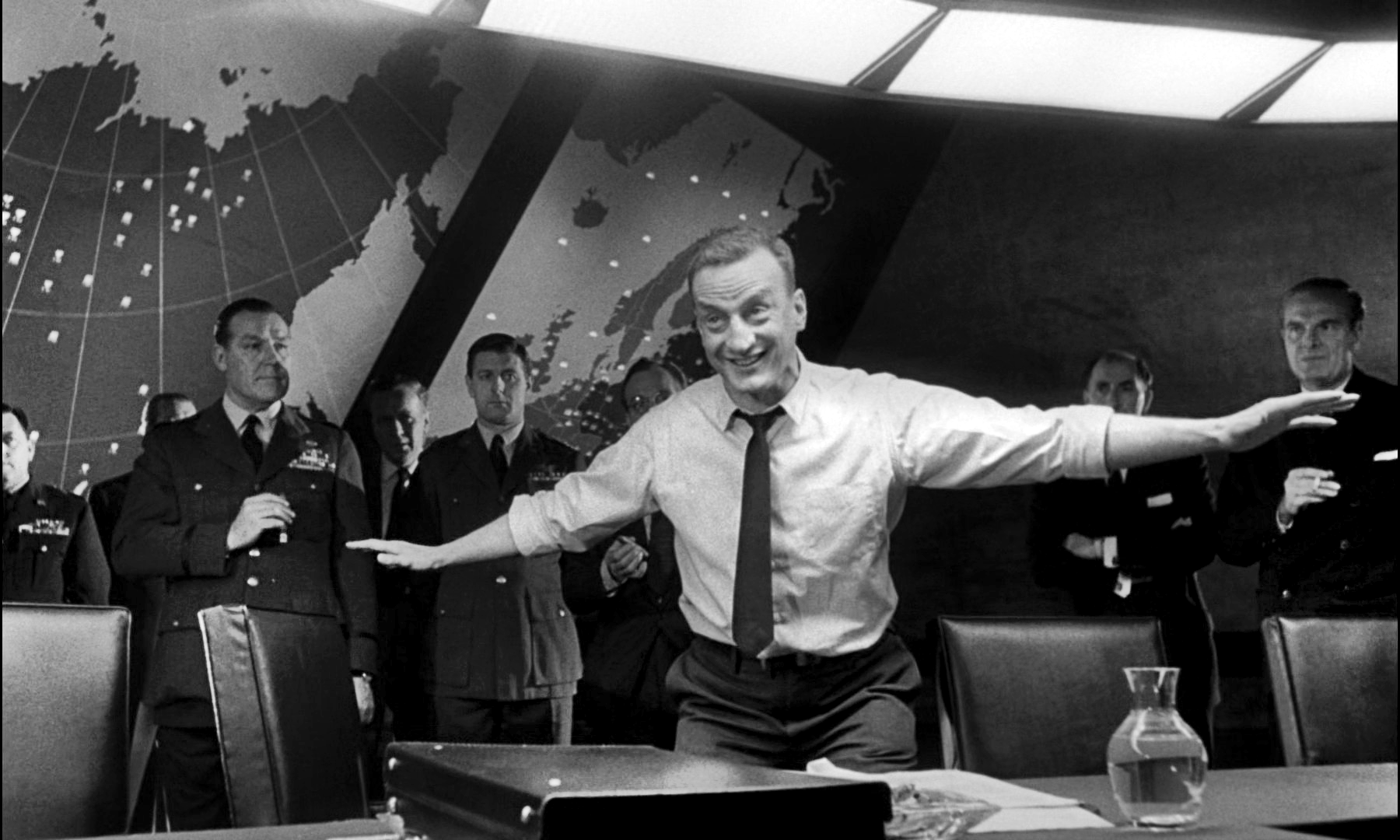
Scott as General Buck Turgidson in Dr. Strangelove, 1964

Scott's highest-profile early role was in the Stanley Kubrick–directed Dr. Strangelove, or How I Learned to Stop Worrying and Love the Bomb (1964), in which he played General "Buck" Turgidson. In later interviews with Kubrick, Scott was revealed to have initially refused to camp it up on camera. As a compromise, Kubrick had Scott go over the top in rehearsal, assuring Scott that the cameras were off, which was untrue. Somehow, Scott was unable to hear the very loud motor on the 35mm film cameras of the time. Kubrick proceeded to use this version in the final cut, which Scott supposedly resented. Scott was one of many stars in The Yellow Rolls-Royce (1964).

Scott was cast, under the direction of John Huston in Dino de Laurentiis's The Bible: In the Beginning, which was released by 20th Century Fox in 1966. Also in 1966, Scott appeared as Jud Barker in the NBC western The Road West (also known as This Savage Land), starring Barry Sullivan, Kathryn Hays, Andrew Prine, and Glenn Corbett. He also guest starred in Bob Hope Presents the Chrysler Theatre. He co-starred with Tony Curtis in the comedy film Not with My Wife, You Don't! (also 1966) and as John Proctor in a television version of The Crucible (1967).

Scott returned to Broadway in 1967 to direct Dr. Cook's Garden by Ira Levin but quit during tryouts. As an actor, he appeared in a revival of The Little Foxes (1967–1968) directed by Mike Nichols, which ran for 100 performances. Scott starred in The Flim-Flam Man (1967) and Petulia (1968). He appeared in the television film Mirror, Mirror Off the Wall (1969).

=== 1970–1979: Established star ===
Scott played George S. Patton in the film Patton (1970) and researched extensively for the role, studying films of the general and talking to those who knew him. Scott declined the Oscar nomination for Patton, just as he had done for his nomination in 1962 for The Hustler, but won the award anyway.

In a letter to the Motion Picture Academy, he stated that he did not feel himself to be in competition with other actors. However, regarding this second rejection of the Academy Award, Scott famously said elsewhere, "The whole thing is a goddamn meat parade. I don't want any part of it." The Best Picture Oscar for Patton was given to the George C. Marshall Foundation Library at the Virginia Military Institute in Lexington, Virginia, the same institution that generations of Pattons attended, by producer Frank McCarthy a few weeks after the awards ceremony, and is on display there. Scott accepted the New York Film Critics Award. His then-wife Colleen Dewhurst said, "George thinks this is the only film award worth having".

During the early 1970s, Scott appeared in the British film Jane Eyre (1970) as Mr. Rochester and the made-for-television film The Price (1971), a version of the Arthur Miller play. For the latter role, he won an Emmy Award, which he accepted. He also directed a TV version of The Andersonville Trial (1970). Scott then returned his focus to feature films. He appeared in They Might Be Giants (1971) with Joanne Woodward, and The Last Run (1971) for director Richard Fleischer, with his wife Colleen Dewhurst and also with Trish Van Devere, who would become his fourth and last wife. Scott had a big hit with The Hospital (1971) based on a script by Paddy Chayefksy; and The New Centurions (1972) directed by Flesicher based on a book by Joseph Wambaugh.

Scott then appeared in a series of box office flops, beginning with Rage (1972), which he both directed and starred in. He then appeared in Oklahoma Crude (1973) directed by Stanley Kramer; The Day of the Dolphin (1973) directed by Mike Nichols, in which Scott appeared with Van Devere; Bank Shot (1974), directed by Gower Champion; and The Savage Is Loose (1974), which co-starred Van Devere and which Scott himself directed. Scott returned to television with Fear on Trial (1975); and starred in the disaster film The Hindenburg (1975) for director Robert Wise.

Scott had a big Broadway hit with Neil Simon's Plaza Suite (1968), directed by Mike Nichols. The show was composed of three separate one-act plays all using the same set, with Scott portraying a different lead character in each act; it ran for 1,097 performances. Scott directed a production of All God's Chillun Got Wings (1975) which starred Van Devere and only had a short run. He directed and played Willy Loman in a 1975 revival of Death of a Salesman, for which he garnered another Tony Award nomination for Best Lead Actor in a Play. Scott was again Tony–nominated in the same category for his performance as Astrov in a 1973 revival of Uncle Vanya, directed by Nichols, which ran for 64 performances. Scott starred in a well-received production of Larry Gelbart's Sly Fox (1976; based on Ben Jonson's Volpone), which ran 495 performances.

Scott appeared in a television production of Beauty and the Beast (1976), with Trish Van Devere. He later starred as an Ernest Hemingway-based artist in Islands in the Stream (1977) directed by Schaffner and based on Hemingway's posthumously published novel. He had a cameo in Crossed Swords (1977) directed by Fleischer, then had the lead in Movie Movie (1978) directed by Stanley Donen, costarring with Van Devere, and Hardcore (1979) written and directed by Paul Schrader.

=== 1980–1989 ===
Scott starred in The Changeling (1980), with Melvyn Douglas, John Colicos, Jean Marsh, and Van Devere, for which he received the Canadian Genie Award for Best Foreign Film Actor for his performance. He followed this with The Formula (1980) co-starring Marlon Brando, which was a flop. With one exception, it was the last time he had the lead in a major studio feature film. Scott returned to Broadway for Tricks of the Trade in 1980 with Van Devere, but it ran for a single performance.

Scott appeared alongside Timothy Hutton and rising stars Sean Penn and Tom Cruise in the coming-of-age film Taps (1981), and was cast as Fagin in the CBS made-for-TV adaptation of Charles Dickens's Oliver Twist (1982). On Broadway, he starred in and directed a successful revival of Noël Coward's Present Laughter which ran during 1982–83. He starred in China Rose (1983) on television, and in 1984, had a supporting role in Firestarter and portrayed Ebenezer Scrooge in a television adaptation of A Christmas Carol. He directed the 1984 Broadway revival of Noël Coward's Design for Living, which ran for 245 performances. In 1986, on Broadway, Scott did The Boys in Autumn in 1986. In 1993, he appeared off-Broadway successfully with Wrong Turn at Lungfish. He was nominated for an Emmy Award for the role. Scott played the title role in the television film Mussolini: The Untold Story (1985).

On Influences:

I think I learned to act from people like James Cagney and Paul Muni. And I'm sure I learned more from Bette Davis than anyone. She has enormous presence, a sense of surprise. She sets you up like a great boxer and BAM! she gives you something else. She does have a certain consistent style, but when you examine her work you find enormous variety of color and intelligence.

— Scott on Some Aspects of Acting, Time, March 22, 1971

Scott reprised his role as Patton in a made-for-television sequel, The Last Days of Patton (1986). Based on the final weeks of Patton's life after being mortally injured in a car accident, it contains flashbacks of Patton's life. At the time the sequel was aired, Scott mentioned in a TV Guide interview that he told the academy to donate his Oscar to the Patton Museum, but since the instructions were never put in writing, it was never delivered.

On television, Scott appeared in The Murders in the Rue Morgue (1986) and Pals (1987; with Don Ameche). He also played the lead role in the TV series Mr. President (1987–88), and appeared on The Johnny Carson Show in March 1987. Scott starred in the television film The Ryan White Story (1989) as Charles Vaughan, the lawyer defending Ryan White.

=== 1990–1999 ===
In 1990, he voiced two villainous roles: Smoke in the television special Cartoon All-Stars to the Rescue and Percival McLeach in the Disney film The Rescuers Down Under. He was featured in The Exorcist III (1990). For TV, he starred in Descending Angel (also 1990) and Finding the Way Home (1991). On Broadway, he directed and appeared in a revival of On Borrowed Time (1991–92). He had a supporting role in Curacao (1993) and Malice (1993). Scott had a starring role in Traps (1994) but the series only ran for five episodes. He also had a semi-regular role on another short-lived series New York News (1995). Around this time, Scott appeared in such feature films as The Whipping Boy (1994), Tyson (1995), and Angus (1995). Scott received another Tony nomination for his performance as Henry Drummond in a revival of Inherit the Wind (1996). In the latter play, he had to miss many performances due to illness, with his role being taken over by National Actors Theatre artistic director Tony Randall. In 1996, he received an honorary Drama Desk Award for a lifetime devotion to American theatre.

On the small screen, Scott appeared in Country Justice (1996), Titanic (1996) (as the ship's captain), and The Searchers (1996). Scott portrayed Juror No. 3 in the television film 12 Angry Men (1997), the role played by Lee J. Cobb in the 1957 film, for which he would win another Emmy Award. He hosted Weapons at War on A&E TV, but was replaced after one season by Gerald McRaney. Weapons at War moved to The History Channel with Scott still credited as host for the first season. Scott was replaced by Robert Conrad after his death in 1999. He had support roles in Gloria (1999) for Sidney Lumet and Rocky Marciano (1999). Scott made his last film, the television film Inherit the Wind (1999), portraying Matthew Harrison Brady (ironically opposite the role he had played on stage) with Jack Lemmon as Henry Drummond, with whom he had also worked in 12 Angry Men. Scott had a reputation for being moody and mercurial while on the set. "There is no question you get pumped up by the recognition ... Then a self-loathing sets in when you realize you're enjoying it", he was quoted as saying. One anecdote relates that one of his stage co-stars, Maureen Stapleton, told the director of Neil Simon's Plaza Suite, "I don't know what to do – I'm scared of him." The director, Mike Nichols, replied, "My dear, everyone is scared of George C. Scott."

== Personal life ==
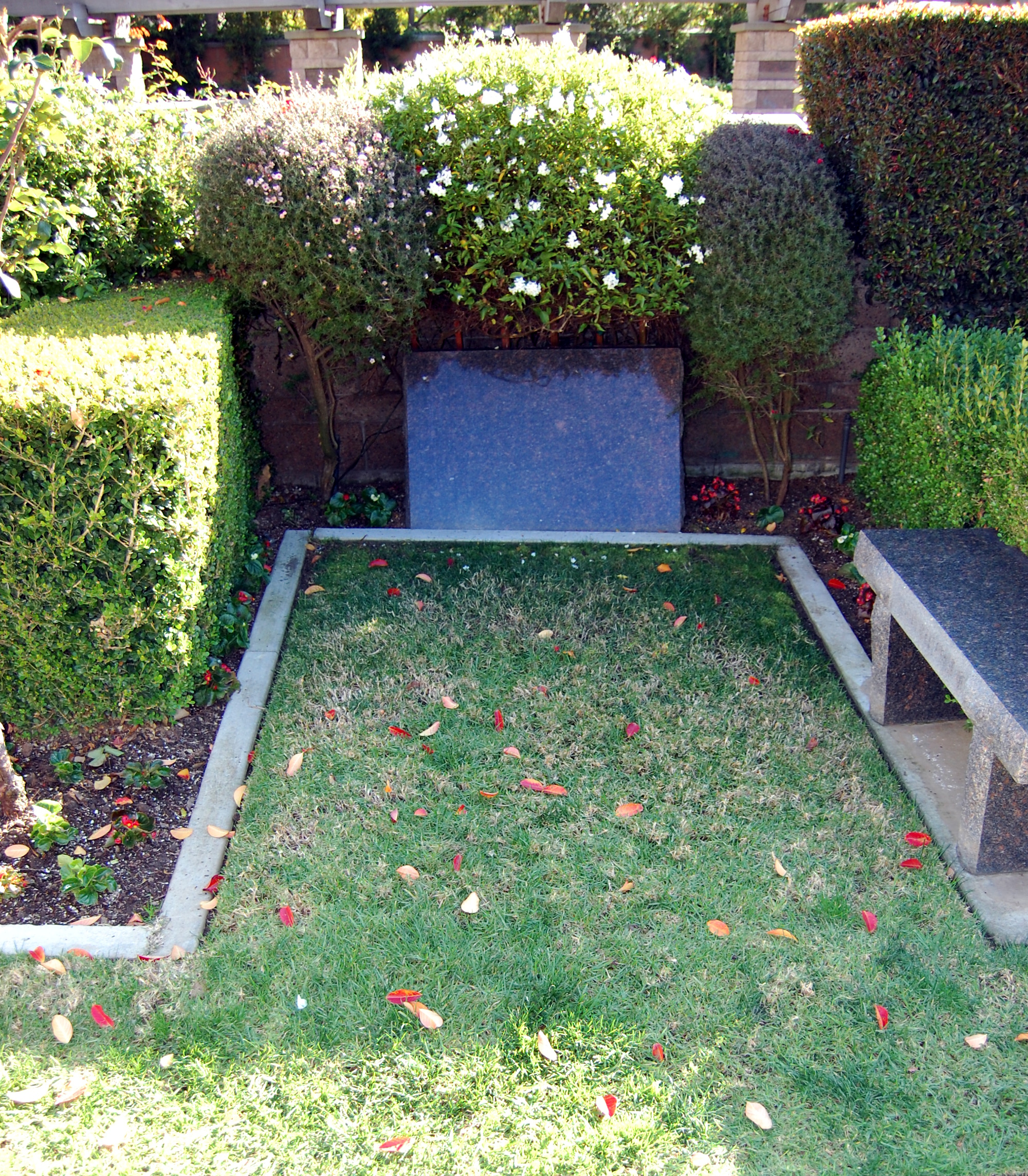
Scott's grave

Scott was married five times:

1. Carolyn Hughes (m. 1951–1955); one daughter (b. December 19, 1952).
2. Patricia Reed (m. 1955–1960); two children, a son and actress Devon Scott.
3. Colleen Dewhurst (m. 1960–1965); two sons, including actor Campbell Scott. Dewhurst nicknamed her husband "G.C."
4. Colleen Dewhurst (remarried July 4, 1967 – divorced for a second time on February 2, 1972).
5. Trish Van Devere (m. September 4, 1972), with whom he starred in several films, including the supernatural thriller The Changeling (1980). Scott met Van Devere while shooting The Last Run (1971), which also featured his ex-wife Dewhurst. Scott adopted Van Devere's nephew, George Dressell, and resided in Malibu. They remained married until his death in 1999.

=== Politics ===
In 1982, Scott appeared in a campaign commercial for moderate Republican U.S. Senator Lowell Weicker of Connecticut. Like Weicker, Scott was, at that time, a resident of Greenwich, Connecticut. Scott identified politically as a moderate conservative and supported the death penalty.

=== Illness and death ===
Scott suffered a series of heart attacks in the 1980s. He died on September 22, 1999, of a ruptured abdominal aortic aneurysm, aged 71. He was interred in the Westwood Village Memorial Park Cemetery in Westwood, California.

== Acting credits ==
=== Film ===
Year	Title	Role	Notes
1956	Somebody Up There Likes Me	Prisoner	Uncredited
1959	The Hanging Tree	George Grubb	
1959	Anatomy of a Murder	Claude Dancer	
1961	The Hustler	Bert Gordon	
1963	The List of Adrian Messenger	Anthony Gethyrn	
1964	Dr. Strangelove	General Buck Turgidson	
1964	The Yellow Rolls-Royce	Paolo Maltese	
1966	The Bible: In the Beginning...	Abraham	
1966	Not with My Wife, You Don't!	Colonel "Tank" Martin	
1967	The Flim-Flam Man	Mordecai Jones	
1968	Petulia	Archie Bollen	
1969	This Savage Land	Jud Barker	
1970	Patton	General George S. Patton Jr.	
1970	Jane Eyre	Edward Rochester	
1971	They Might Be Giants	Justin Playfair / "Sherlock Holmes"	
1971	The Last Run	Harry Garmes	
1971	The Hospital	Herbert Bock	
1972	The New Centurions	Andy Kilvinski	
1972	Rage	Dan Logan	Also director
1973	Oklahoma Crude	Noble Mason	
1973	The Day of the Dolphin	Jake Terrell	
1974	Bank Shot	Walter Upjohn Ballentine	
1974	The Savage Is Loose	John	Also director
1975	The Hindenburg	Colonel Franz Ritter	
1977	Islands in the Stream	Thomas Hudson	
1977	Crossed Swords	The Ruffler	
1978	Movie Movie	"Gloves" Malloy / "Spats" Baxter	
1979	Hardcore	Jake Van Dorn	
1980	The Changeling	John Russell	
1980	The Formula	Lieutenant Barney Caine	
1981	Taps	Brigadier General Harlan Bache	
1983	China Rose	Burton Allen	
1984	Firestarter	John Rainbird	
1989	The Ryan White Story	Charles Vaughan Sr.	
1990	The Exorcist III	Lieutenant William F. Kinderman	
1990	The Rescuers Down Under	Percival McLeach	Voice
1990	Descending Angel	Florian Stroia	
1993	Curaçao	Cornelius Wettering	
1993	Malice	Martin Kessler	
1994	The Whipping Boy	George "Blind George"	
1995	Tyson	Constantine "Cus" D'Amato	
1995	Angus	Grandpa Ivan Bethune	
1999	Gloria	Reuben "Ruby"	

=== Television ===
Year	Title	Role	Notes
1958	The DuPont Show of the Month	Jacques	Episode: "A Tale of Two Cities"
1958	Kraft Theatre	John Oakhurst / Nicholas Dreydel	2 episodes
1958	Omnibus	Maximilien Robespierre	Episode: "The Empty Chair"
1959	The United States Steel Hour	Marshal Gulliver	Episode: "Trap for a Stranger"
1959	Sunday Showcase	Dr. Richard Bryan	Episode: "People Kill People Sometimes"
1959	Playhouse 90	Juan de la Torre	Episode: "Target for Three"
1959	Winterset	Trock Estrella	Television film
1960	Play of the Week	The Devil	Episode: "Don Juan in Hell"
1960	Dow Hour of Great Mysteries	Edward Stevens	Episode: "The Burning Court"
1961	Ben Casey	Karl Anders	Episode: "I Remember a Lemon Tree"
1961	The Power and the Glory	Police Lieutenant	Television film
1961	Golden Showcase	Lord Henry Wotton	Episode: "The Picture of Dorian Gray"
1962	Naked City	Kermit Garrison	Episode: "Strike a Statue"
1962	Monitor	Shylock	Episode: "Stratford-on-the-Subway"
1962	The Virginian	Arthur Lilly	Episode: "The Brazen Bell"
1962	The Eleventh Hour	Anton Novak	Episode: "I Don't Belong in a White-Painted House"
1963–1964	East Side West Side	Neil Brock	26 episodes
1965	Bob Hope Presents the Chrysler Theatre	Captain Vince McGuire	Episode: "A Time for Killing"
1965	The Red Skelton Hour	Dr. Hardship	Episode: "Freddie at the South Pole or Panhandle with Care"
1966	The Road West	Jud Barker	2 episodes
1967	The Crucible	John Proctor	Television film
1969	Mirror, Mirror Off the Wall	Max Maxwell / N.Y. Rome	Television film
1971	The Price	Victor Franz	Television film
1975	Fear on Trial	Louis Nizer	Television film
1976	Beauty and the Beast	The Beast	Television film
1982	Oliver Twist	Fagin	Television film
1984	A Christmas Carol	Ebenezer Scrooge	Television film
1985	Mussolini: The Untold Story	Benito Mussolini	Miniseries
1986	Choices	Evan Granger	Television film
1986	The Last Days of Patton	General George S. Patton Jr.	Television film
1986	The Murders in the Rue Morgue	C. Auguste Dupin	Television film
1987	Pals	Jack H. Stobbs / John Livingston Spangler	Television film
1987–1988	Mr. President	President Samuel Arthur Tresch	24 episodes
1990	Cartoon All-Stars to the Rescue	Smoke	Voice, television special
1991	Finding the Way Home	Max Mittelmann	Television film
1994	Traps	Joe Trapcheck	5 episodes
1994	Prince Brat and the Whipping Boy	Blind George	Television film
1994	In the Heat of the Night	Judge Walker	Episode: "A Matter of Justice"
1995	New York News	Ollie Herman	3 episodes
1996	Titanic	Captain Edward J. Smith	Miniseries
1997	Country Justice	Clayton Hayes	Television film
1997	12 Angry Men	Juror #3	Television film
1999	Rocky Marciano	Pierino Marchegiano	Television film
1999	Inherit the Wind	Matthew Harrison Brady	Television film

=== Theater ===
Year	Title	Role	Playwright	Venue	Ref
1958	Comes a Day	Tydings Glen	Speed Lamkin	Ambassador Theatre, Broadway debut	
1959	The Andersonville Trial	Lt. Col. Norton P. Chipman	Saul Levitt	Henry Miller's Theatre, Broadway	
1960	The Wall	Dolek Berson	Millard Lampell	Billy Rose Theatre, Broadway	
1962	General Seeger	Maj. General Seeger	Ira Levin	Lyceum Theatre, Broadway	
1967	Dr. Cook's Garden	Director	Ira Levin	Belasco Theatre, Broadway	
1967	The Little Foxes	Benjamin Hubbard	Lillian Hellman	Ethel Barrymore Theatre, Broadway	
1968	Plaza Suite	Jesse Kiplinger; Roy Hubley; Sam Nash	Neil Simon	Plymouth Theatre, Broadway	
1973	Uncle Vanya	Mikhail Astrov	Anton Chekov	Circle in the Square Theatre, Broadway	
1975	All God's Chillun Got Wings	Director	Eugene O'Neill	Circle in the Square Theatre, Broadway	
1975	Death of a Salesman	Willy Loman	Arthur Miller	Circle in the Square Theatre, Broadway	
1976	Sly Fox	Foxwell J. Sly; The Judge	Larry Gelbart	Broadhurst Theatre, Broadway	
1980	Tricks of the Trade	Dr. Augustus Browning	Sidney Michaels	Brooks Atkinson Theatre, Broadway	
1982	Present Laughter	Garry Essendine; Director	Noël Coward	Circle in the Square Theatre, Broadway	
1984	Design for Living	Director	Noël Coward	Circle in the Square Theatre, Broadway	
1986	The Boys in the Autumn	Henry Finnegan	Bernard Sabath	Circle in the Square Theatre, Broadway	
1991	On Borrowed Time	Julian Northrup / Gramps	Paul Osborn	Circle in the Square Theatre, Broadway	
1996	Inherit the Wind	Henry Drummond	Bernard Sabath	Royale Theatre, Broadway	

== Awards and nominations ==
Over his career Scott received numerous accolades including an Academy Award, two Golden Globes and two Primetime Emmy Awards. He also received nominations for two Actor Awards, two British Academy Film Awards, and five Tony Awards.

Scott has been recognized by the Academy of Motion Picture Arts and Sciences for the following performances:

- 32nd Academy Awards: Best Supporting Actor, nomination, as Claude Dancer in Anatomy of a Murder (1959),
- 34th Academy Awards: Best Supporting Actor, nomination, as Bert Gordon in The Hustler (1961)
- 43rd Academy Awards: Best Actor, win, as General George S. Patton in Patton (1970)
- 44th Academy Awards: Best Actor, nomination, as Dr. Herbert Bock, in The Hospital (1971)

== See also ==
- List of actors with Academy Award nominations
- List of actors with more than one Academy Award nomination in the acting categories
- List of atheists in film, radio, television and theater
- List of Golden Globe winners
- List of Primetime Emmy Award winners
