= Colleen Dewhurst =

Canadian-American actress (1924–1991)

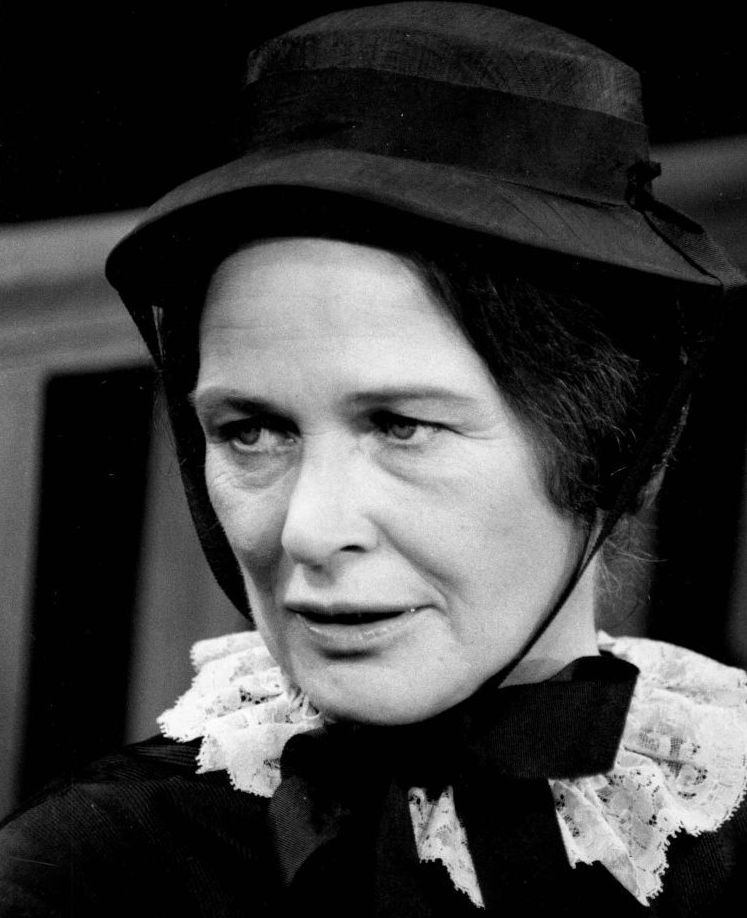
- Colleen Dewhurst in The Trial of Susan B. Anthony (1971)
- Born: Colleen Rose Dewhurst; June 3, 1924; Montreal, Quebec, Canada
- Died: August 22, 1991 (aged 67); South Salem, New York, U.S.
- Occupation: Actress
- Years active: 1952–1991
- Spouses: James Vickery (m. 1947; div. 1960); George C. Scott (m. 1960; div. 1965); (m. 1967; div. 1972)
- Partner: Ken Marsolais (1975–1991; her death)
- Children: 2, including Campbell Scott
- Awards: 2 Tony Awards; 4 Emmy Awards

11th President of the Actors' Equity Association
- In office 1985 – 1991 (died in the office)
- Preceded by: Ellen Burstyn
- Succeeded by: Ron Silver

Colleen Rose Dewhurst (June 3, 1924 – August 22, 1991) was a Canadian-American actress mostly known for theatre roles. She was a renowned interpreter of the works of Eugene O'Neill on the stage, and her career also encompassed film, early dramas on live television, and performances in Joseph Papp's New York Shakespeare Festival. One of her last roles was playing Marilla Cuthbert in the Kevin Sullivan television adaptations of the Anne of Green Gables series and her reprisal of the role in the subsequent TV series Road to Avonlea. In the United States, Dewhurst won two Tony Awards and four Primetime Emmy Awards for her stage and television work. In addition to other Canadian honors over the years, Dewhurst won two Gemini Awards (the former Canadian equivalent of an Emmy Award) for her portrayal of Marilla Cuthbert; once in 1986 and again in 1988.

Dewhurst was a co-founder of the Writers and Artists for Peace in the Middle East, a pro-Israel group.

== Early life ==
Dewhurst was born June 3, 1924, in Montreal, Quebec, the only child of Frances Marie (nee Woods) and Ferdinand Augustus "Fred" Dewhurst. Fred Dewhurst was the owner of a chain of confectionery stores and had been a celebrated athlete in Canada, where he had played football with the Ottawa Rough Riders. The family became naturalized as U.S. citizens before 1940. Colleen Dewhurst's mother was a Christian Scientist, a faith Colleen also embraced.

The Dewhursts moved to Massachusetts in 1928 or 1929, staying in the Boston area neighborhoods of Dorchester, Auburndale, and West Newton. Later they moved to New York City and then to Whitefish Bay, Wisconsin. Dewhurst attended Whitefish Bay High School for her first two years of high school, moved to Shorewood High School for her junior year, and graduated from Riverside High School in Milwaukee in 1942. About this time her parents separated. Dewhurst attended Milwaukee-Downer College for two years, then moved to New York City to pursue an acting career.

== Career ==
One of her more significant stage roles was in the 1974 Broadway revival of O'Neill's A Moon for the Misbegotten as Josie Hogan, for which she won a Tony Award. She previously won the Tony Award for Best Featured Actress in 1961 for All the Way Home. She later played Katharina in a 1956 production of Taming of the Shrew for Joseph Papp. She (as recounted in her posthumous obituary in collaboration with Tom Viola) wrote:

With Brooks Atkinson's blessing, our world changed overnight. Suddenly in our audience of neighbors in T-shirts and jeans appeared men in white shirts, jackets and ties and ladies in summer dresses. We were in a hit that would have a positive effect on my career, as well as Joe's, but I missed the shouting.

She played Shakespeare's Cleopatra and Lady Macbeth for Papp and years later, Gertrude in a production of Hamlet at the Delacorte Theatre in Central Park.

She appeared in the Alfred Hitchcock Presents episode Night Fever in 1965 and with Ingrid Bergman in More Stately Mansions on Broadway in 1967. José Quintero directed her in O'Neill's Long Day's Journey into Night and Mourning Becomes Electra. She appeared in Edward Albee's adaptation of Carson McCullers' Ballad of the Sad Cafe and as Martha in a Broadway revival of Who's Afraid of Virginia Woolf?, with Ben Gazzara which Albee directed.

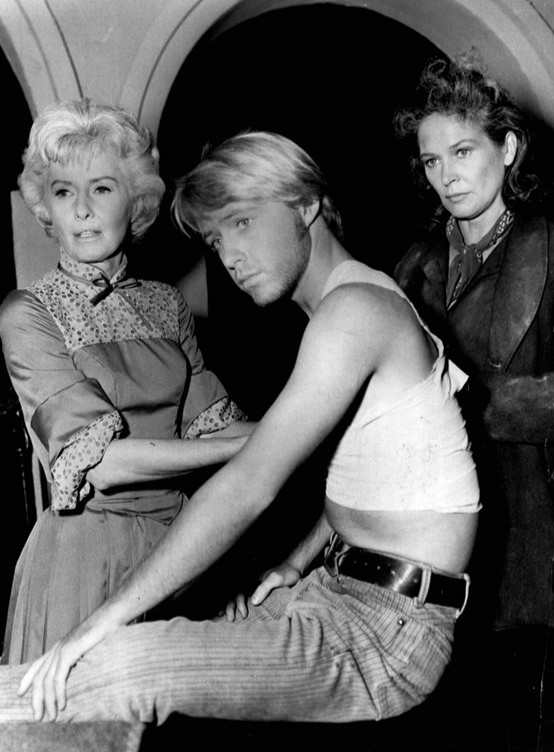
Dewhurst (right) guest starring on The Big Valley in 1966 with Barbara Stanwyck (left) and Michael Burns

She appeared in 1962 as Joanne Novak in the episode "I Don't Belong in a White-Painted House" in the medical drama The Eleventh Hour, starring Wendell Corey and Jack Ging. Dewhurst appeared opposite her then husband, Scott, in a 1971 television adaptation of Arthur Miller's The Price, on Hallmark Hall of Fame, and an anthology series. There is another television recording of them together when she played Elizabeth Proctor to the unfaithful John in Miller's The Crucible (with Tuesday Weld). In 1977, Woody Allen cast her in his film Annie Hall as Annie's mother.

In her autobiography, Dewhurst wrote: "I had moved so quickly from one Off-Broadway production to the next that I was known, at one point, as the 'Queen of Off-Broadway'. This title was not due to my brilliance, but, rather, because most of the plays I was in closed after a run of anywhere from one night to two weeks. I would then move immediately into another."

In 1972, she played a madam, Mrs. Kate Collingwood, in The Cowboys (1972), which starred John Wayne. Dewhurst also appeared with Wayne in the 1974 film McQ. She was the first actress to share a love scene with Wayne in bed. In 1985, she played the role of Marilla Cuthbert in Kevin Sullivan's adaptation of Lucy Maud Montgomery's novel Anne of Green Gables and reprised the role in 1987's Anne of Avonlea (also known as Anne of Green Gables: The Sequel) and in several episodes of Kevin Sullivan's Road to Avonlea.

Dewhurst was on hiatus from Road to Avonlea when she died in 1991. Sullivan Productions was unaware she was terminally ill, so her portrayal of Marilla ended posthumously. This was accomplished by shooting new scenes with actress Patricia Hamilton acting as a body double for Dewhurst and by recycling parts of scenes from Anne of Green Gables, Road to Avonlea, and using Dewhurst's death scene as Hepzibah in Sullivan's production of Lantern Hill. The latter was a 1990 television film based on L.M. Montgomery's Jane of Lantern Hill.

During 1989 and 1990, she appeared in a supporting role on the television series Murphy Brown playing Avery Brown, the feisty mother of Candice Bergen's title character; this role earned her two Emmy Awards, the second being awarded posthumously. Dewhurst won a total of two Tony Awards and four Emmy Awards for her stage and television work. Season 4, Episode 6 entitled "Full Circle" was the Murphy Brown episode filmed shortly after her death and dedicated to her memory.

In a review of Dewhurst's final film role as Ruth in Bed and Breakfast (1991), Emanuel Levy wrote “Bed and Breakfast is the kind of small, intimate picture that actors revere. The stunningly sensual Dewhurst, in one of her last screen roles, dominates every scene she is in, making the lusty and down-to-earth Ruth at once credible and enchanting.“

Dewhurst was president of the Actors' Equity Association from 1985 until her death. She was the first national president to die in the office.

== Personal life and final years ==
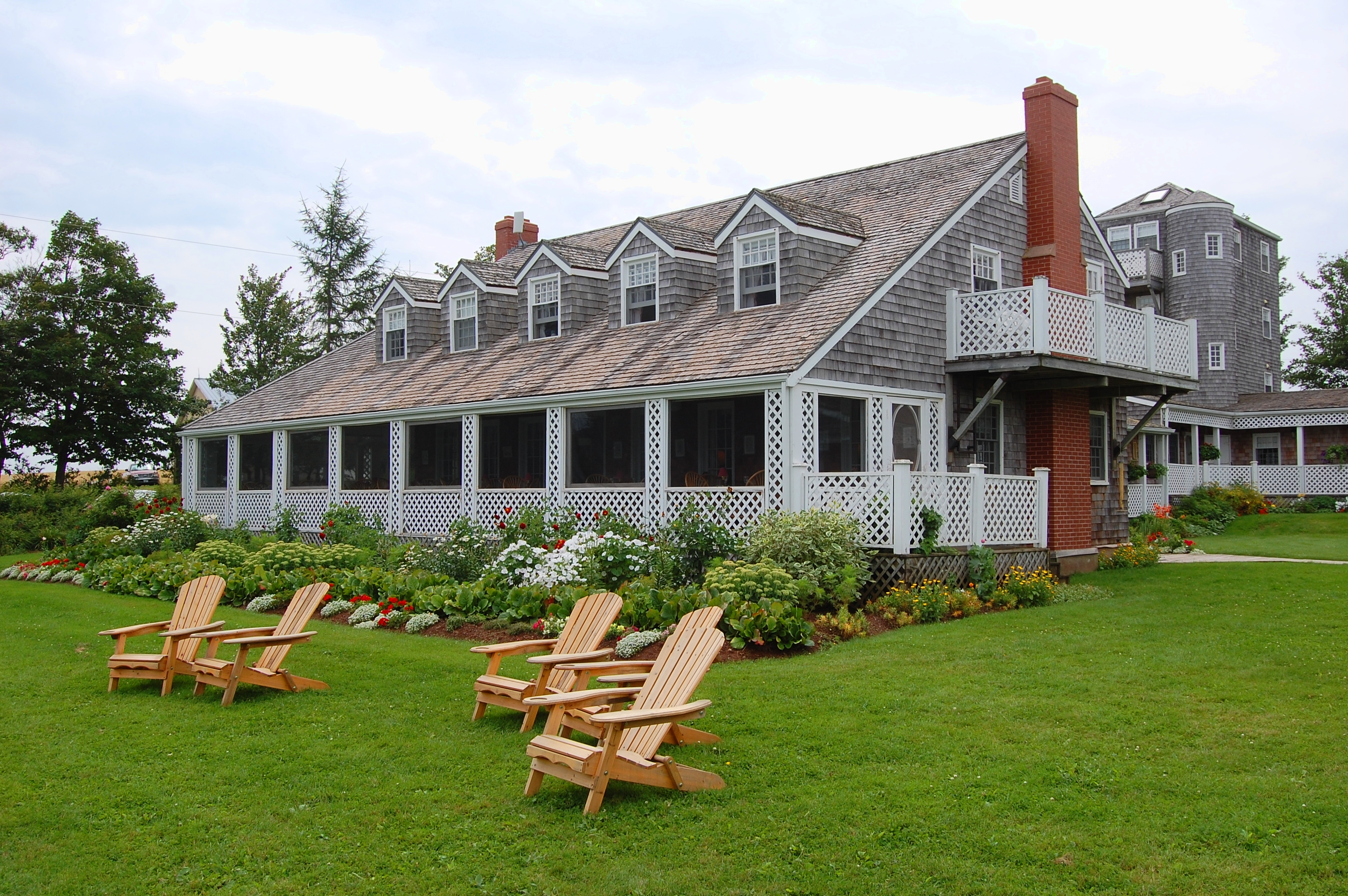
Dewhurst's summer home at Fortune Bridge, Prince Edward Island, was built by the playwright Elmer Blaney Harris. It is a private inn as of August 2008.

Colleen Dewhurst was married to James Vickery from 1947 to 1960. She married and divorced George C. Scott twice. They had two sons, Alexander Scott and actor Campbell Scott; she co-starred with Campbell in Dying Young (1991), one of her last film roles as she died in August 1991. During the last years of her life she lived on a farm in South Salem, New York, with her partner Ken Marsolais. They also had a summer home on Prince Edward Island, Canada.

Maureen Stapleton wrote about Dewhurst:

Colleen looked like a warrior, so people assumed she was the earth mother. But in real life Colleen was not to be let out without a keeper. She couldn't stop herself from taking care of people, which she then did with more care than she took care of herself. Her generosity of spirit was overwhelming and her smile so dazzling that you couldn't pull the ... reins in on her even if you desperately wanted to and knew damn well that somebody should.

Dewhurst's Christian Science beliefs led to her refusal to accept any kind of surgical treatment. She died of cervical cancer at the age 67 at her South Salem home in 1991. She was cremated and her ashes were given to family and friends; no public service was planned.

== Filmography ==
=== Films and television films ===
| Year | Title | Role | Notes |
|---|---|---|---|
| 1959 | The Nun's Story | Archangel Gabriel | |
| 1960 | Man on a String | Helen Benson | |
| 1961 | The Foxes | | television film |
| 1962 | Focus | | television film |
| 1966 | A Fine Madness | Dr. Vera Kropotkin | |
| 1967 | The Crucible | Elizabeth Proctor | television film (adaptation of the play The Crucible) |
| 1971 | The Price | Esther Franz | television film |
| 1971 | The Last Run | Monique | |
| 1972 | The Cowboys | Kate Collingwood | |
| 1972 | The Hands of Cormac Joyce | Molly Joyce | television film |
| 1973 | Legend in Granite | Marie Lombardi | television film |
| 1974 | Parker Addison, Philosopher | Hostess | television film |
| 1974 | The Music School | Hostess | television film |
| 1974 | McQ | Myra | |
| 1974 | The Story of Jacob and Joseph | Rebekah | television film |
| 1975 | A Moon for the Misbegotten | Josie Hogan | television film (adaptation of the play A Moon for the Misbegotten) |
| 1977 | Annie Hall | Mrs. Hall | |
| 1978 | The Third Walker | Kate Maclean | |
| 1978 | Ice Castles | Beulah Smith | |
| 1979 | Silent Victory: The Kitty O'Neil Story | Patsy O'Neil | television film |
| 1979 | When a Stranger Calls | Tracy Fuller | |
| 1979 | And Baby Makes Six | Anna Kramer | television film |
| 1979 | Mary and Joseph: A Story of Faith | Elizabeth | television film |
| 1980 | Death Penalty | Elaine Lipton | television film |
| 1980 | Escape | Lily Levinson | television film |
| 1980 | Guyana Tragedy: The Story of Jim Jones | Myrtle Kennedy | miniseries |
| 1980 | The Women's Room | Val | television film (based on the book The Women's Room) |
| 1980 | A Perfect Match | Meg Larson | television film |
| 1980 | Baby Comes Home | Anna Kramer | television film |
| 1980 | Final Assignment | Dr. Valentine Ulanova | |
| 1980 | Tribute | Gladys Petrelli | |
| 1981 | A Few Days in Weasel Creek | Cora Jackfield | television film |
| 1982 | Split Cherry Tree | Mrs. Sexton | |
| 1982 | Between Two Brothers | | television film |
| 1983 | Sometimes I Wonder | Grandma | television film |
| 1983 | The Dead Zone | Henrietta Dodd | |
| 1984 | You Can't Take It with You | Grand Duchess Olga Katrina | television film (adaptation of the play You Can't Take It with You) |
| 1984 | The Glitter Dome | Lorna Dillman | television film |
| 1985 | Anne of Green Gables | Marilla Cuthbert | television film |
| 1986 | Between Two Women | Barbara Petherton | television film |
| 1986 | Johnny Bull | Marie Kovacs | television film |
| 1986 | As Is | Hospice Worker | television film |
| 1986 | The Boy Who Could Fly | Carolyn Sherman | |
| 1986 | Sword of Gideon | Golda Meir | television film |
| 1987 | Hitting Home | Judge | television film |
| 1987 | Bigfoot | Gladys Samco | television film |
| 1987 | Anne of Green Gables: The Sequel | Marilla Cuthbert | television film |
| 1988 | Woman in the Wind | | |
| 1989 | Those She Left Behind | Margaret Page | television film |
| 1989 | Termini Station | Molly Dushane | |
| 1990 | The Exorcist III | Pazuzu | Voice, Uncredited |
| 1990 | Kaleidoscope | Margaret Gorham | television film |
| 1990 | Lantern Hill | Elizabeth | television film |
| 1991 | Dying Young | Estelle Whittier | |
| 1991 | Bed & Breakfast | Ruth Wellesly | final film role |

=== Television work (excluding television films) ===
| Year | Title | Role | Notes |
|---|---|---|---|
| 1957 | Studio One | | teleplay: First Prize for Murder |
| 1958 | Kraft Television Theatre | | teleplay: Presumption of Innocence |
| 1958 | Decoy | Taffy | episode: "Deadly Corridor" |
| 1958 | DuPont Show of the Month | | teleplay: The Count of Monte Cristo |
| 1959 | DuPont Show of the Month | Aldonza Lorenzo/Dulcinea del Toboso | teleplay: I, Don Quixote |
| 1959 | Play of the Week | Mordeen Saul / Woman | teleplays: Burning Bright; Medea |
| 1959 | The United States Steel Hour | Vera Brandon | teleplay: The Hours Before Dawn |
| 1961 | Play of the Week | Inèz Serrano | teleplays: No Exit; The Indifferent Lover |
| 1961 | Ben Casey | Phyllis Anders | episode: "I Remember a Lemon Tree" |
| 1962 | The Eleventh Hour | Joanne Novak | episode: "I Don't Belong in a White-Painted House" |
| 1962 | The Virginian | Celia Ames | episode: "The Executioners" |
| 1962 | The Nurses | Grace Milo | episode: "Fly, Shadow" |
| 1963 | The United States Steel Hour | Francie Broderick | teleplay: Night Run to the West |
| 1963 | DuPont Show of the Month | Karen Holt | teleplay: Something to Hide |
| 1964 | East Side/West Side | Shirley | episode: "Nothing but the Half Truth" |
| 1965 | Dr. Kildare | Eleanor Markham | episode: "All Brides Should Be Beautiful" |
| 1965 | The Alfred Hitchcock Hour | Nurse Ellen Hatch | episode: "Night Fever" |
| 1966 | The F.B.I. | Amy Doucette | episode: "The Baby Sitter" |
| 1966 | The Big Valley | Annie Morton | episode: "A Day of Terror" |
| 1971 | ITV Sunday Night Theatre | Esther Franz | teleplay: The Price |
| 1971 | Hallmark Hall of Fame | Esther Franz | teleplay: The Price |
| 1972 | Hallmark Hall of Fame | Molly Joyce | teleplay: The Hands of Cormac Joyce |
| 1973 | Wide World Mystery | Margery Landing | episode: "A Prowler in the Heart" |
| 1979 | Studs Lonigan | Mary Lonigan | miniseries |
| 1982 | Quincy, M.E. | Dr. Barbara Ludow | episode: "For Love of Joshua" |
| 1982 | The Blue and the Gray | Maggie Geyser | miniseries |
| 1983 | Great Performances | Red Queen | teleplay: Alice in Wonderland |
| 1984 | Finder of Lost Loves | Rachel Green | episode: "Echoes" |
| 1984 | The Love Boat | Maud | episode: "Welcome Aboard: Part 1 and 2" |
| 1985 | A.D. | Antonia Minor | miniseries |
| 1988 | The Twilight Zone | Hallie Parker | episode: "There Was an Old Woman" |
| 1989 | Moonlighting | Betty Russell | episode: "Take My Wife, for Example" |
| 1989–1990 | Murphy Brown | Avery Brown Sr. | 3 episodes: -"Brown Like Me: Part 1 and Part II" (1989) -"Mama Said" (1989) -"Bob & Murphy & Ted & Avery (1990) |
| 1990 | The Civil War | Various | miniseries |
| 1990–1992 | Road to Avonlea | Marilla Cuthbert | 4 episodes: "Of Corsets and Secrets and True, True Love", "The Materializing of Duncan McTavish", "The Quarantine at Alexander Abraham's" and "Old Friends New Wounds (Marilla's Death)" |

=== Theatre ===
| Year | Play | Role |
|---|---|---|
| 1952 | Desire Under the Elms | Neighbor |
| 1956 | Tamburlaine the Great | Virgin of Memphis / Turkish Concubine |
| 1957–1958 | The Country Wife | Mrs. Squeamish |
| 1960 | Caligula | Milonia Caesonia |
| 1960–1961 | All the Way Home | Mary Follet |
| 1962 | Great Day in the Morning | Phoebe Flaherty |
| 1963–1964 | The Ballad of the Sad Café | Miss Amelia Evans |
| 1967–1968 | More Stately Mansions | Sara Melody |
| 1970 | The Good Woman of Setzuan | Shen Te |
| 1971 | All Over | The Mistress |
| 1972 | Mourning Becomes Electra | Christine Mannon |
| 1973–1974 | A Moon for the Misbegotten | Josie Hogan |
| 1976 | Who's Afraid of Virginia Woolf? | Martha |
| 1977–1978 | An Almost Perfect Person | Irene Porter |
| 1982 | The Queen and the Rebels | Argia |
| 1983–1984 | You Can't Take It with You | Grand Duchess Olga Katrina |
| 1982 | Long Day's Journey into Night | Mary Cavan Tyrone |
| 1982 | Ah, Wilderness! | Essie Miller |
| 1989–1990 | Love Letters | Melissa Gardner |

== Awards and nominations ==
=== American Theater Hall of Fame ===
| Year | Category | Nominated work | Result | Ref. |
|---|---|---|---|---|
| 1981 | American Theater Hall of Fame | —N/a | Inducted | |

=== CableACE Awards ===
| Year | Category | Nominated work | Result | Ref. |
|---|---|---|---|---|
| 1988 | Supporting Actress in a Movie or Miniseries | Anne of Green Gables: The Sequel | Won | |
| 1991 | Supporting Actress in a Movie or Miniseries | Lantern Hill | Won | |
| 1992 | Actress in a Dramatic Series | Road to Avonlea | Nominated | |

=== Drama Desk Awards ===
| Year | Category | Nominated work | Result | Ref. |
|---|---|---|---|---|
| 1970 | Outstanding Performance | Hello and Goodbye | Won | |
| 1971 | Outstanding Performance | All Over | Won | |
| 1973 | Outstanding Performance | Mourning Becomes Electra | Won | |
| 1974 | Outstanding Performance | A Moon for the Misbegotten | Won | |
| 1983 | Outstanding Actress in a Play | The Queen and the Rebels | Nominated | |
| 1989 | Outstanding Actress in a Play | Long Day's Journey into Night | Nominated | |

=== Gemini Awards ===
| Year | Category | Nominated work | Result | Ref. |
|---|---|---|---|---|
| 1986 | Best Performance by a Supporting Actress | Anne of Green Gables | Won | |
| 1988 | Best Performance by a Supporting Actress | Anne of Green Gables: The Sequel | Won | |
| 1990 | Best Guest Performance in a Series by an Actor or Actress | Road to Avonlea | Nominated | |

=== Genie Awards ===
| Year | Category | Nominated work | Result | Ref. |
|---|---|---|---|---|
| 1980 | Best Actress in a Supporting Role | Tribute | Nominated | |
| 1988 | Best Actress in a Supporting Role | Hitting Home | Won | |
| 1989 | Best Actress in a Leading Role | Termini Station | Nominated | |

=== Obie Awards ===
| Year | Category | Nominated work | Result | Ref. |
|---|---|---|---|---|
| 1957 | Distinguished Performance by an Actress | The Taming of the Shrew / The Eagle Has Two Heads / Camille | Won | |
| 1963 | Distinguished Performance by an Actress | Desire Under the Elms | Won | |

=== Primetime Emmy Awards ===
| Year | Category | Nominated work | Result | Ref. |
|---|---|---|---|---|
| 1962 | Outstanding Performance in a Supporting Role by an Actress | Focus | Nominated | |
| 1968 | Outstanding Single Performance by an Actress in a Leading Role in a Drama | The Crucible | Nominated | |
| 1971 | Outstanding Single Performance by an Actress in a Leading Role | Hallmark Hall of Fame (Episode: "The Price") | Nominated | |
| 1976 | Outstanding Lead Actress in a Drama or Comedy Special | A Moon for the Misbegotten | Nominated | |
| 1979 | Outstanding Supporting Actress in a Limited Series or a Special | Silent Victory: The Kitty O'Neil Story | Nominated | |
| 1981 | Outstanding Supporting Actress in a Limited Series or a Special | The Women's Room | Nominated | |
| 1986 | Outstanding Supporting Actress in a Miniseries or a Special | Between Two Women | Won | |
| 1989 | Outstanding Supporting Actress in a Miniseries or a Special | Those She Left Behind | Won | |
| 1989 | Outstanding Guest Actress in a Comedy Series | Murphy Brown (Episode: "Mama Said") | Won | |
| 1990 | Outstanding Supporting Actress in a Miniseries or a Special | Lantern Hill | Nominated | |
| 1990 | Outstanding Guest Actress in a Drama Series | Road to Avonlea (Episode: "The Quarantine at Alexander Abraham's") | Nominated | |
| 1991 | Outstanding Guest Actress in a Comedy Series | Murphy Brown (Episode: "Bob & Murphy & Ted & Avery") | Won | |
| 1991 | Outstanding Guest Actress in a Drama Series | Road to Avonlea (Episode: "The Materializing of Duncan McTavish") | Nominated | |

=== Sarah Siddons Awards ===
| Year | Category | Nominated work | Result | Ref. |
|---|---|---|---|---|
| 1975 | Sarah Siddons Award | —N/a | Inducted | |

=== Stinkers Bad Movie Awards ===
| Year | Category | Nominated work | Result | Ref. |
|---|---|---|---|---|
| 1979 | Worst Supporting Actress | Ice Castles | Nominated | |

=== Theatre World Awards ===
| Year | Category | Nominated work | Result | Ref. |
|---|---|---|---|---|
| 1958 | —N/a | Children of Darkness | Won | |

=== Tony Awards ===
| Year | Category | Nominated work | Result | Ref. |
|---|---|---|---|---|
| 1961 | Best Supporting or Featured Actress in a Play | All the Way Home | Won | |
| 1962 | Best Leading Actress in a Play | Great Day in the Morning | Nominated | |
| 1964 | Best Leading Actress in a Play | The Ballad of the Sad Café | Nominated | |
| 1968 | Best Leading Actress in a Play | More Stately Mansions | Nominated | |
| 1972 | Best Leading Actress in a Play | All Over | Nominated | |
| 1973 | Best Leading Actress in a Play | Mourning Becomes Electra | Nominated | |
| 1974 | Best Leading Actress in a Play | A Moon for the Misbegotten | Won | |
| 1977 | Best Leading Actress in a Play | Who's Afraid of Virginia Woolf? | Nominated | |

=== Viewers for Quality Television Awards ===
| Year | Category | Nominated work | Result | Ref. |
|---|---|---|---|---|
| 1991 | Specialty Player | Murphy Brown | Nominated | |

=== Western Heritage Awards ===
| Year | Category | Nominated work | Result | Ref. |
|---|---|---|---|---|
| 1972 | Theatrical Motion Picture | The Cowboys | Won | |

== Bibliography ==
- Dewhurst, Colleen; Viola, Tom (1997). Colleen Dewhurst - Her Autobiography. Scribner. ISBN 978-0-684-80701-0.
