= Between Two Women =

Between Two Women may refer to:

- Between Two Women (1937 film)
- Between Two Women (1945 film)
- Between Two Women (1986 film)
- Between Two Women (2000 film)
