= The Women's Room (film) =

- Genre: Drama
- Based on: The Women's Room by Marilyn French
- Written by: Carol Sobieski
- Directed by: Glenn Jordan
- Starring: Lee Remick; Ted Danson; Colleen Dewhurst; Tovah Feldshuh
- Music by: Billy Goldenberg
- Country of origin: United States
- Original language: English

Production
- Executive producer: Philip Mandelker
- Producers: Anna Cottle; Kip Gowans
- Cinematography: Terry K. Meade
- Editor: John Wright
- Production company: Warner Bros. Television

Original release
- Network: ABC
- Release: September 14, 1980

The Women's Room is a 1980 American made-for-television drama film directed by Glenn Jordan and starring Lee Remick, Ted Danson, Colleen Dewhurst and Tovah Feldshuh. In spite of Esther Shapiro's (ABC's vice president for miniseries) struggle with the (predominantly male) network to release the film despite its feminist content, "The Women's Room finally aired, and it received a huge 45 share (the highest rated movie on TV that week), prompted a raft of positive mail, and won an Emmy".

The film is an adaptation of the novel The Women's Room by Marilyn French.

== Premise ==
A married mother of two leaves her philandering husband and enrolls in graduate school.

== Cast ==
- Lee Remick as Mira Adams
- Colleen Dewhurst as Val
- Patty Duke as Lily
- Kathryn Harrold as Bliss
- Tovah Feldshuh as Iso
- Tyne Daly as Adele
- Lisa Pelikan as Kyla
- Heidi Vaughn as Samantha
- Mare Winningham as Chris
- Ted Danson as Norman
- Gregory Harrison as Ben Volper
- Jenny O'Hara as Mrs. Martinelli
- Christopher Pennock as Harley
- Al Corley as Tad Ford

== Critical reception ==
Critic Tom Shales found the film to be annoying and a "stinker." John J. O'Connor found the film to be a successful adaptation of the book and thoroughly enjoyed the movie, stating that "No one will be bored."
