= 38th Primetime Emmy Awards =

1986 American television programming awards

- Date: September 21, 1986 (Ceremony); September 6, 1986 (Creative Arts Awards)
- Location: Pasadena Civic Auditorium, Pasadena, California
- Presented by: Academy of Television Arts and Sciences
- Hosted by: David Letterman; Shelley Long

Highlights
- Most awards: Major: Cagney & Lacey (4); Overall: St. Elsewhere (6)
- Most nominations: The Cosby Show (13)
- Outstanding Comedy Series: The Golden Girls
- Outstanding Drama Series: Cagney & Lacey
- Outstanding Miniseries: Peter the Great
- Outstanding Variety, Music or Comedy Program: The Kennedy Center Honors

Television/radio coverage
- Network: NBC

The 38th Primetime Emmy Awards were presented on September 21, 1986, at the Pasadena Civic Auditorium in Pasadena, California. The Emmy ceremony was cohosted by David Letterman and Shelley Long. 28 awards were given. During the ceremony, Letterman saluted Grant Tinker, who had stepped down as chairman of NBC due to its parent company, RCA, having been acquired by General Electric. The ceremony was also memorable for the presentation of the Governors' Award to Red Skelton, presented by comedy legend Lucille Ball, who in his acceptance speech said he had missed being on TV for the previous 16 years.

This year's ceremony saw the return of the guest acting category. The top shows of the night were The Golden Girls which won Outstanding Comedy Series and two other major awards. The Golden Girls became the first series to gain three nominations in a lead acting category, they would repeat this feat multiple times. For the second straight year Cagney & Lacey won for Outstanding Drama Series, and led all shows with four major wins. With help from the guest acting category, The Cosby Show with 13 nominations broke the record for most major nominations by a comedy series of 11 set by The Mary Tyler Moore Show in 1977. This record has since been surpassed.

== Winners and nominees ==
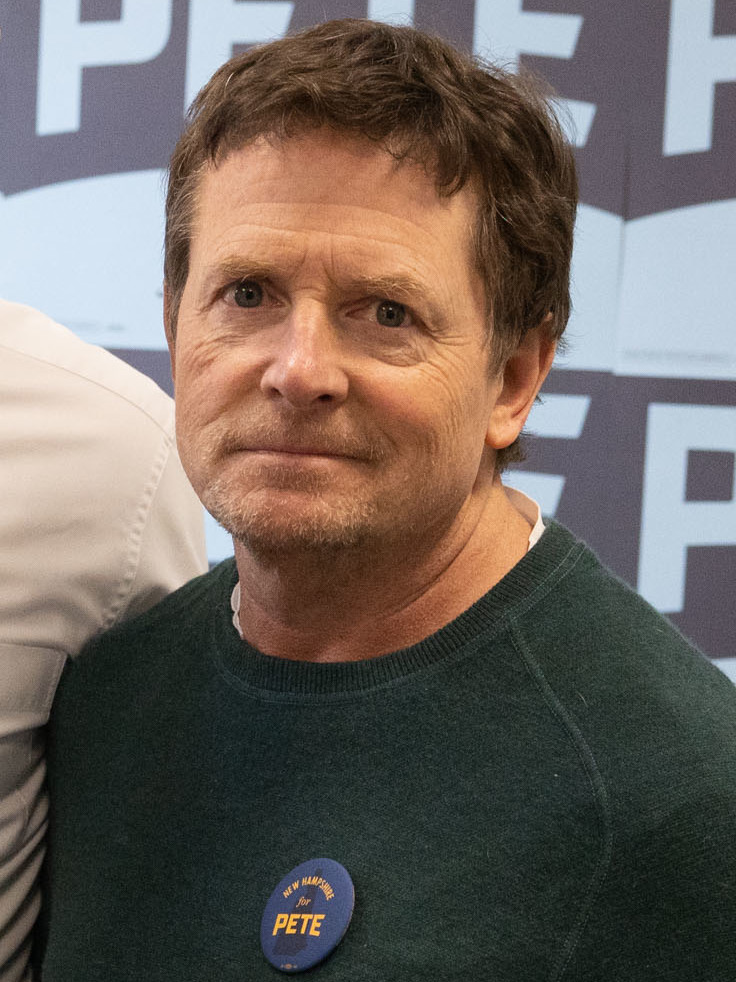
Michael J. Fox, Outstanding Lead Actor in a Comedy Series winner

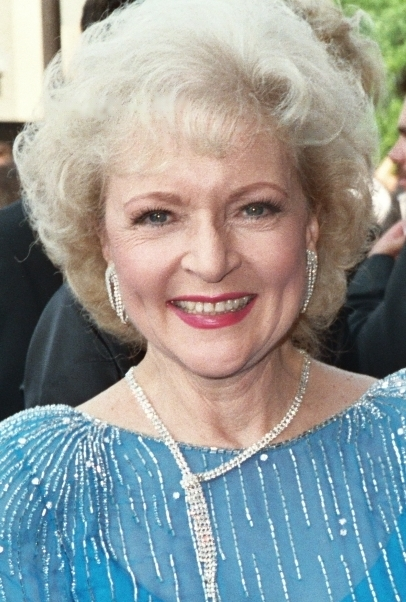
Betty White, Outstanding Lead Actress in a Comedy Series winner

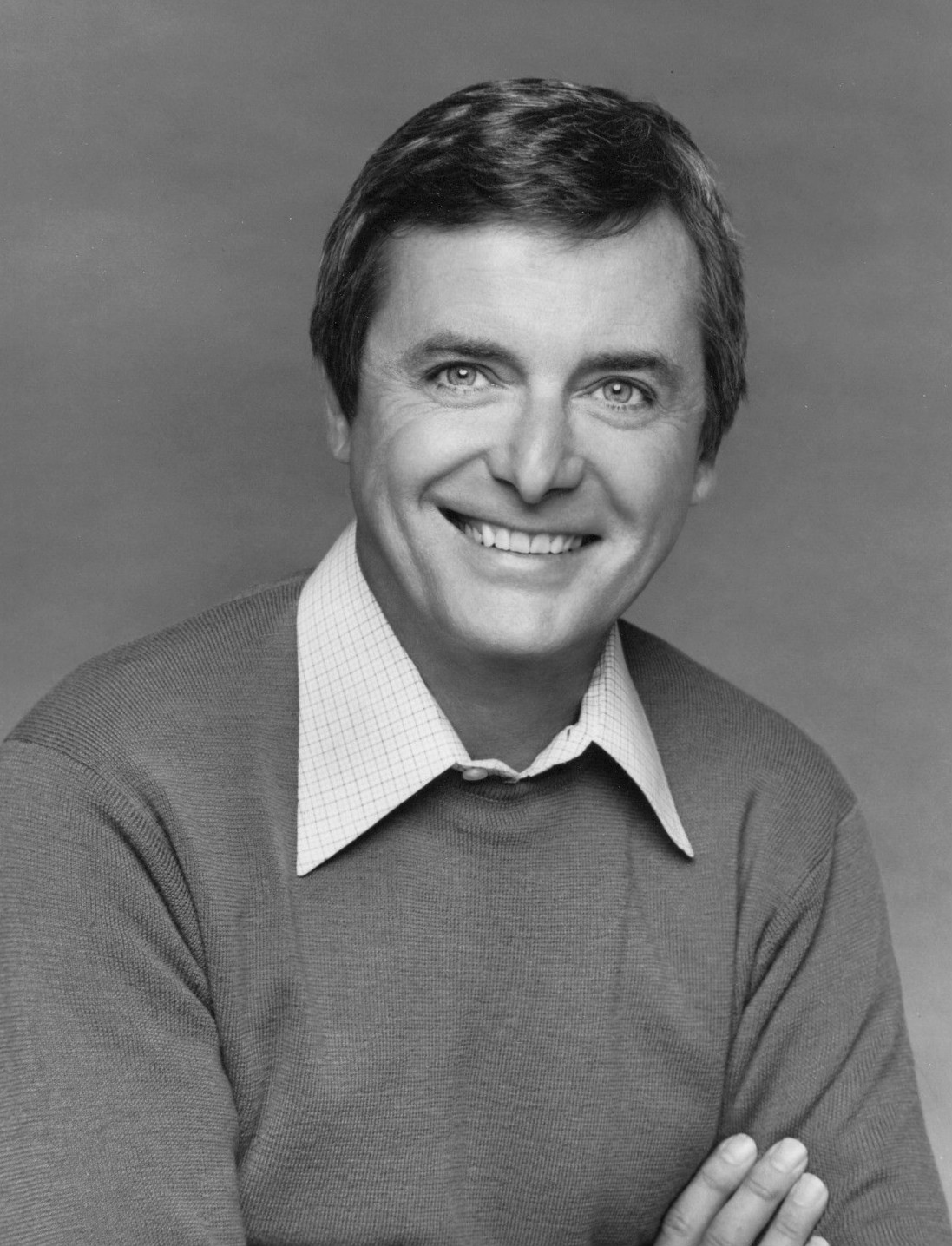
William Daniels, Outstanding Lead Actor in a Drama Series winner

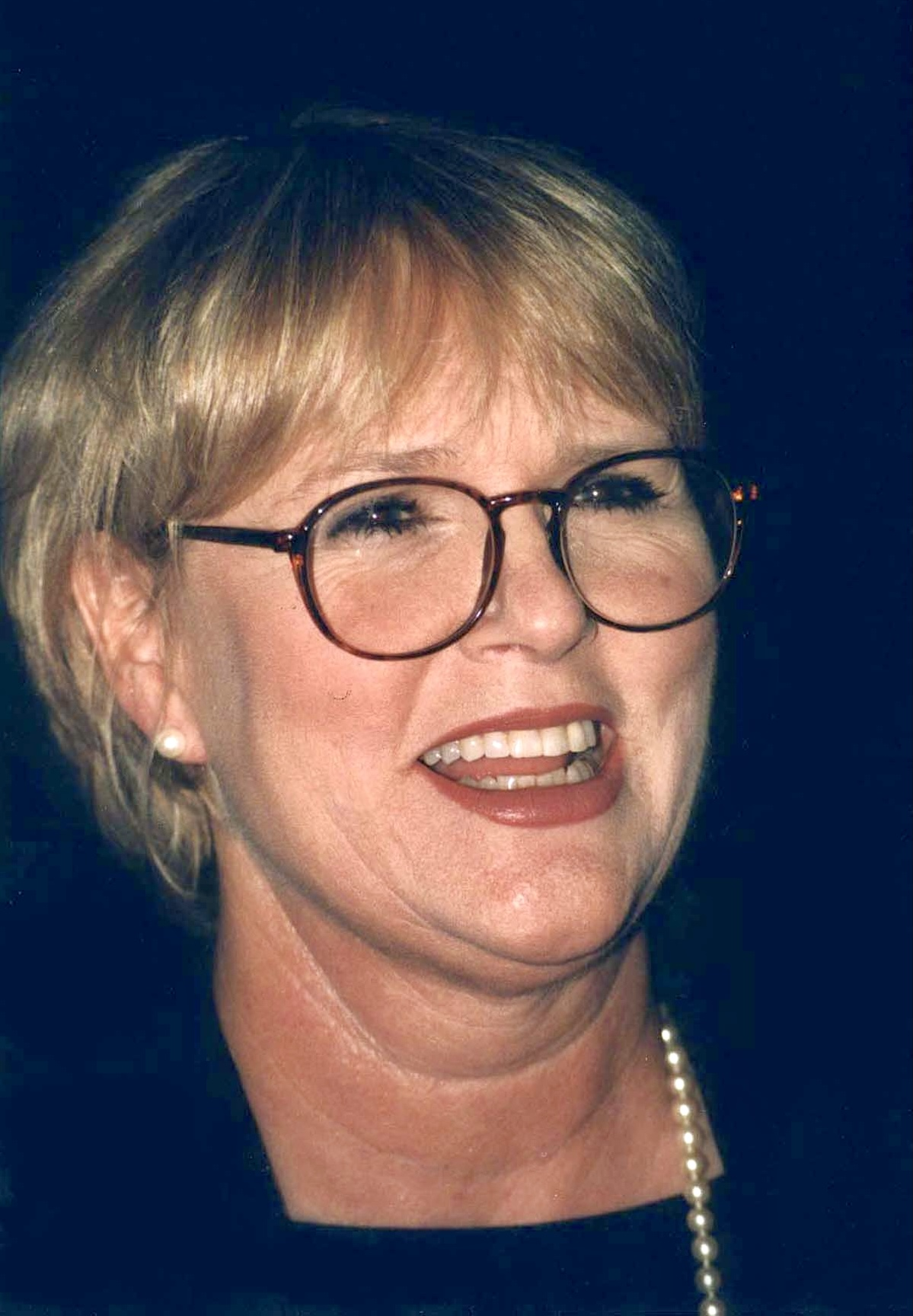
Sharon Gless, Outstanding Lead Actress in a Drama Series winner

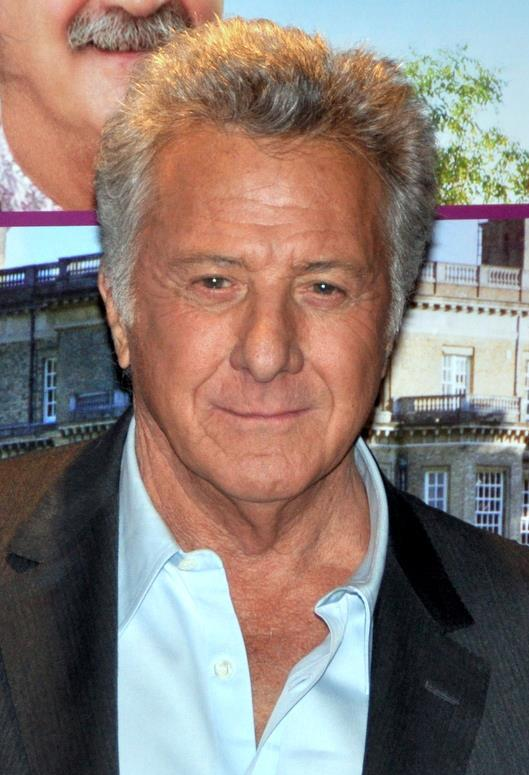
Dustin Hoffman, Outstanding Lead Actor in a Miniseries or a Special winner

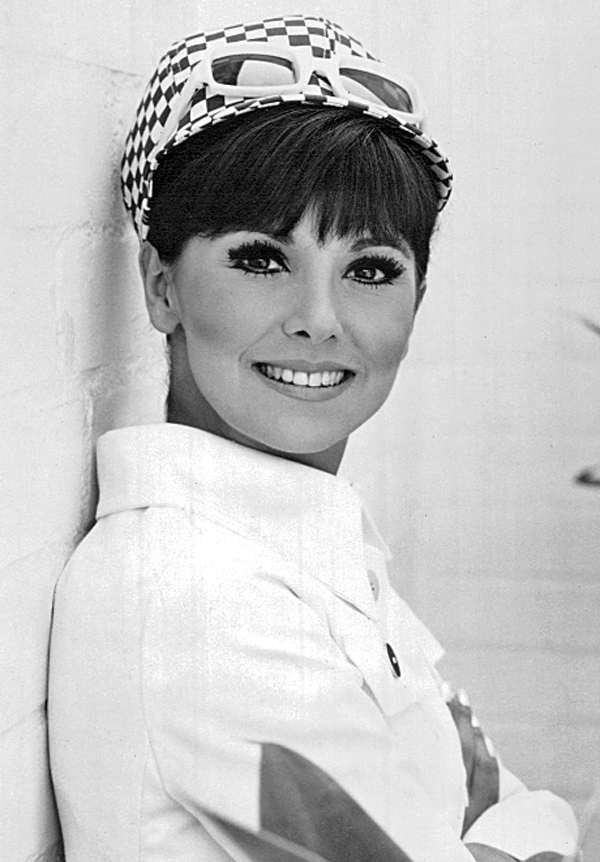
Marlo Thomas, Outstanding Lead Actress in a Miniseries or a Special winner

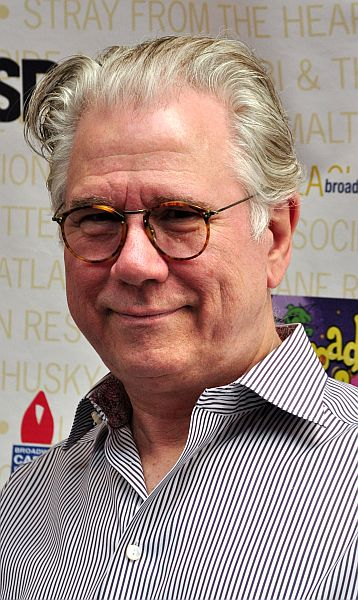
John Larroquette, Outstanding Supporting Actor in a Comedy Series winner

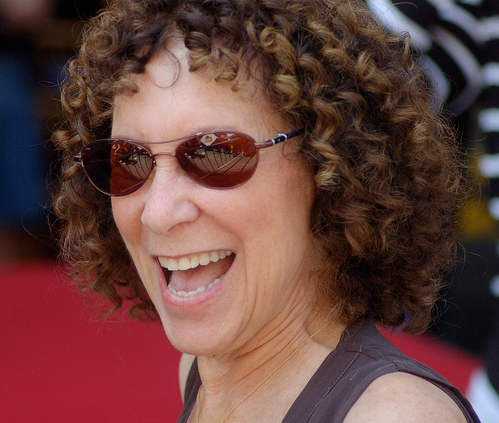
Rhea Perlman, Outstanding Supporting Actress in a Comedy Series winner

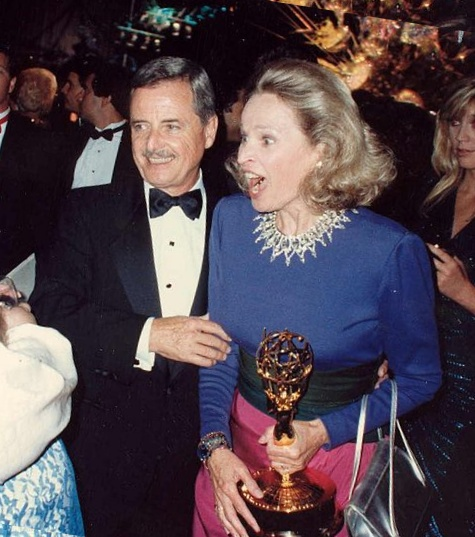
Bonnie Bartlett, Outstanding Supporting Actress in a Drama Series winner

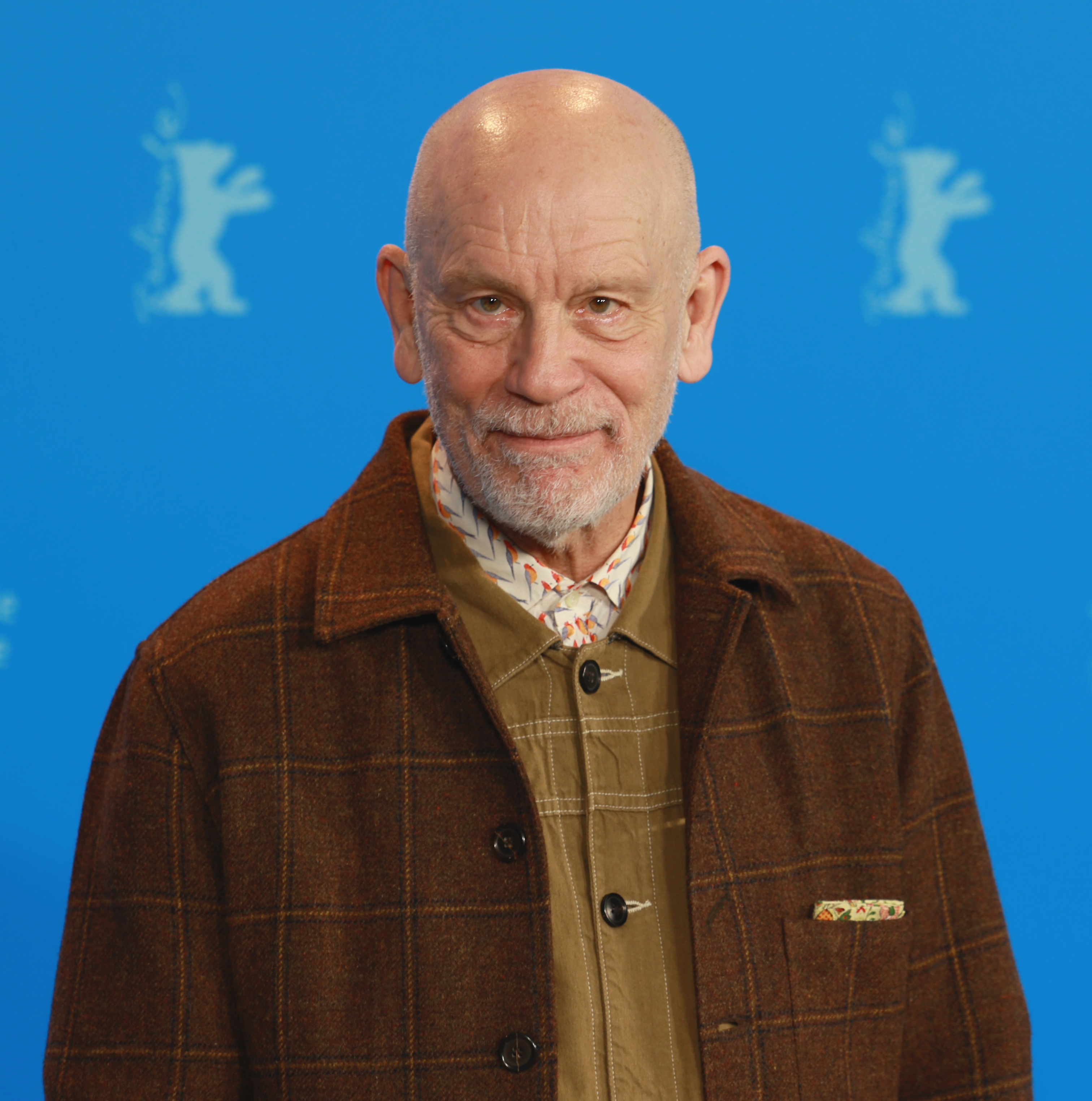
John Malkovich, Outstanding Supporting Actor in a Miniseries or a Special winner

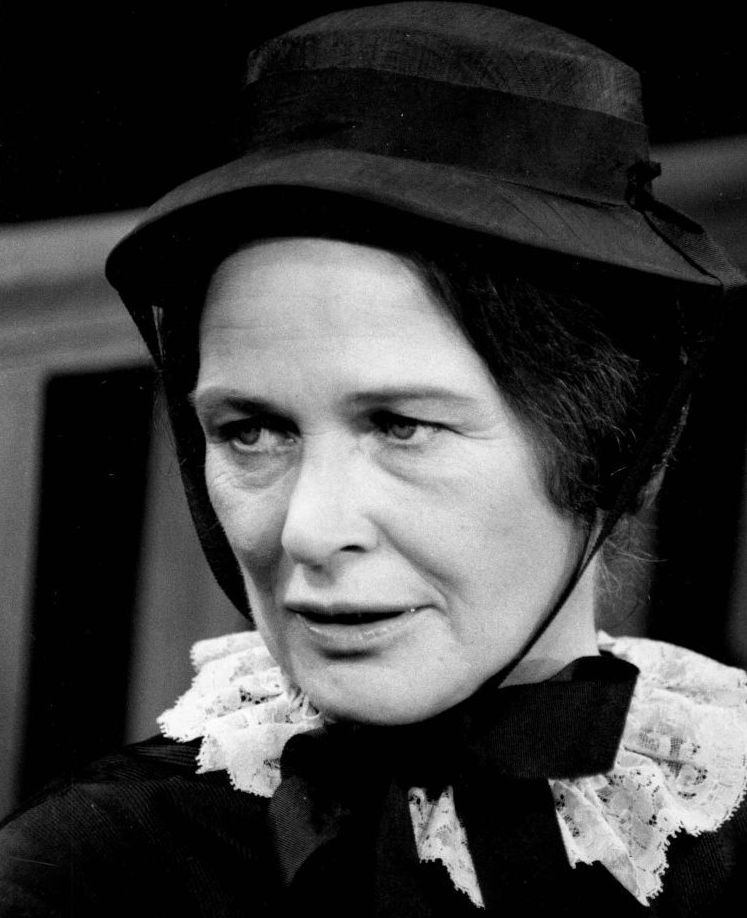
Colleen Dewhurst, Outstanding Supporting Actress in a Miniseries or a Special winner

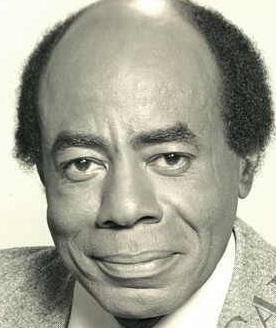
Roscoe Lee Browne, Outstanding Guest Performer in a Comedy Series winner

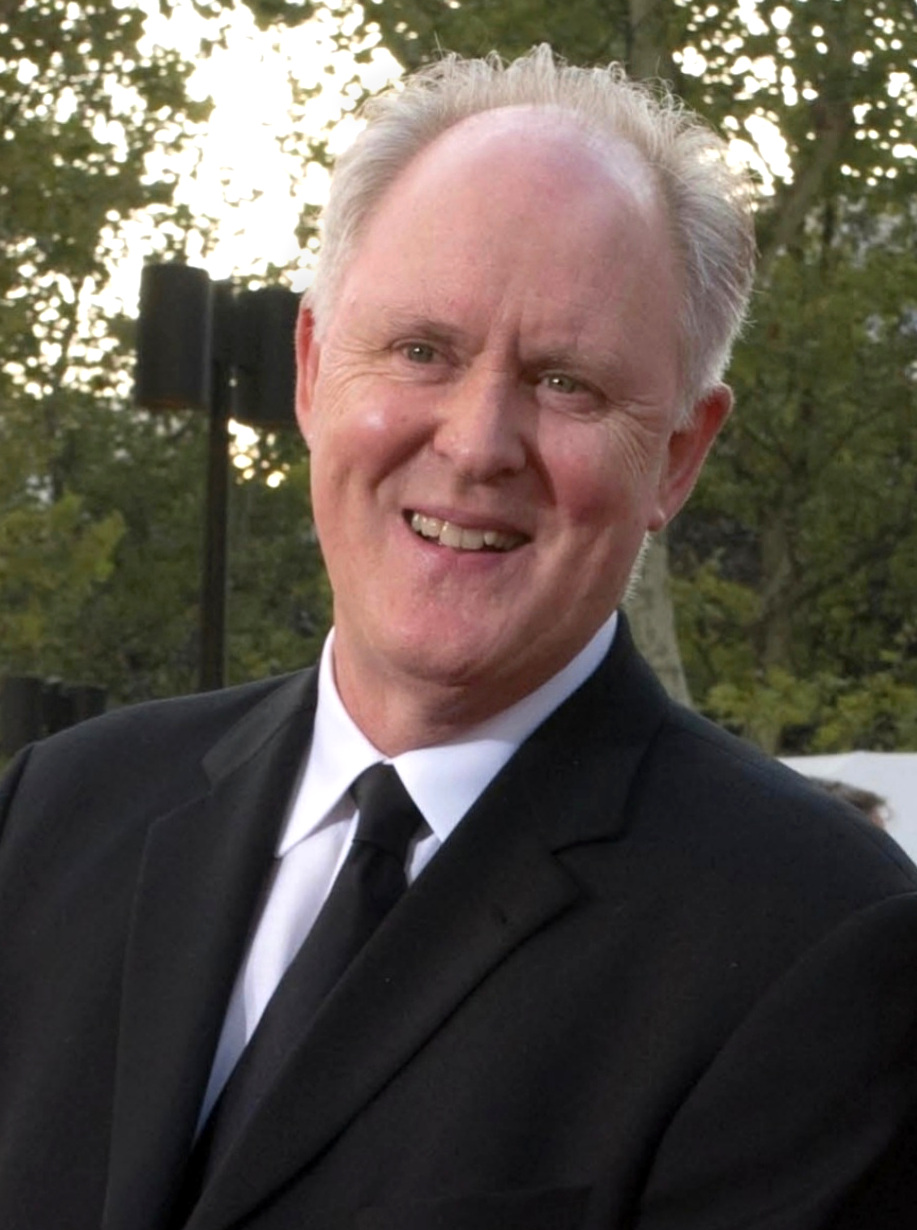
John Lithgow, Outstanding Guest Performer in a Drama Series winner

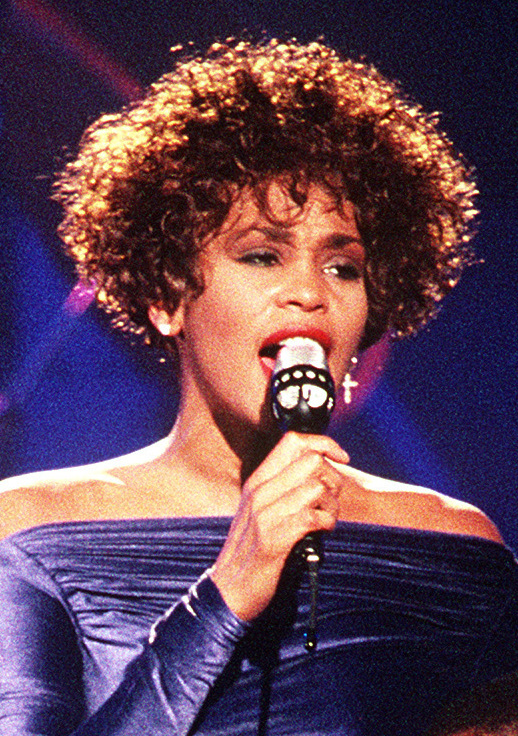
Whitney Houston, Outstanding Individual Performance in a Variety or Music Program winner

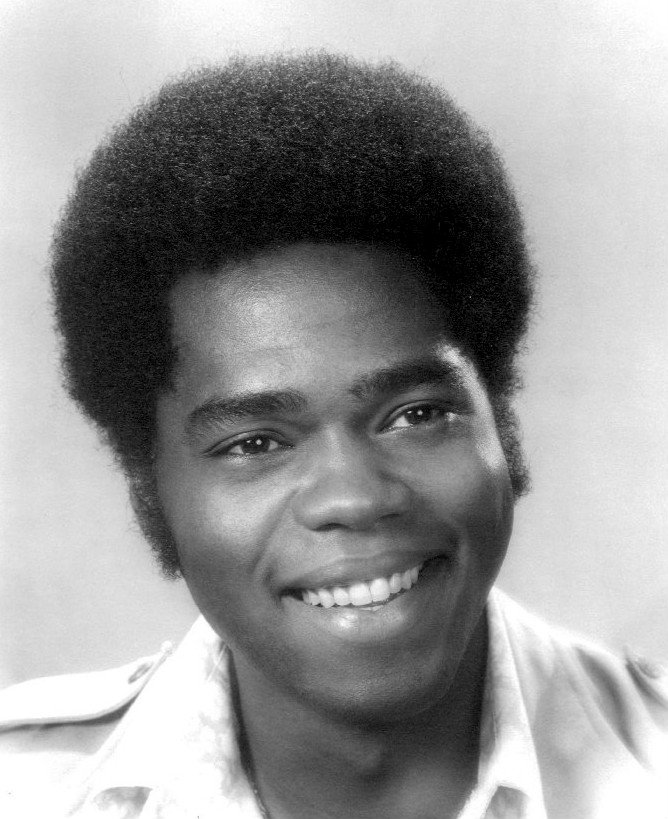
Georg Stanford Brown, Outstanding Directing in a Drama Series winner

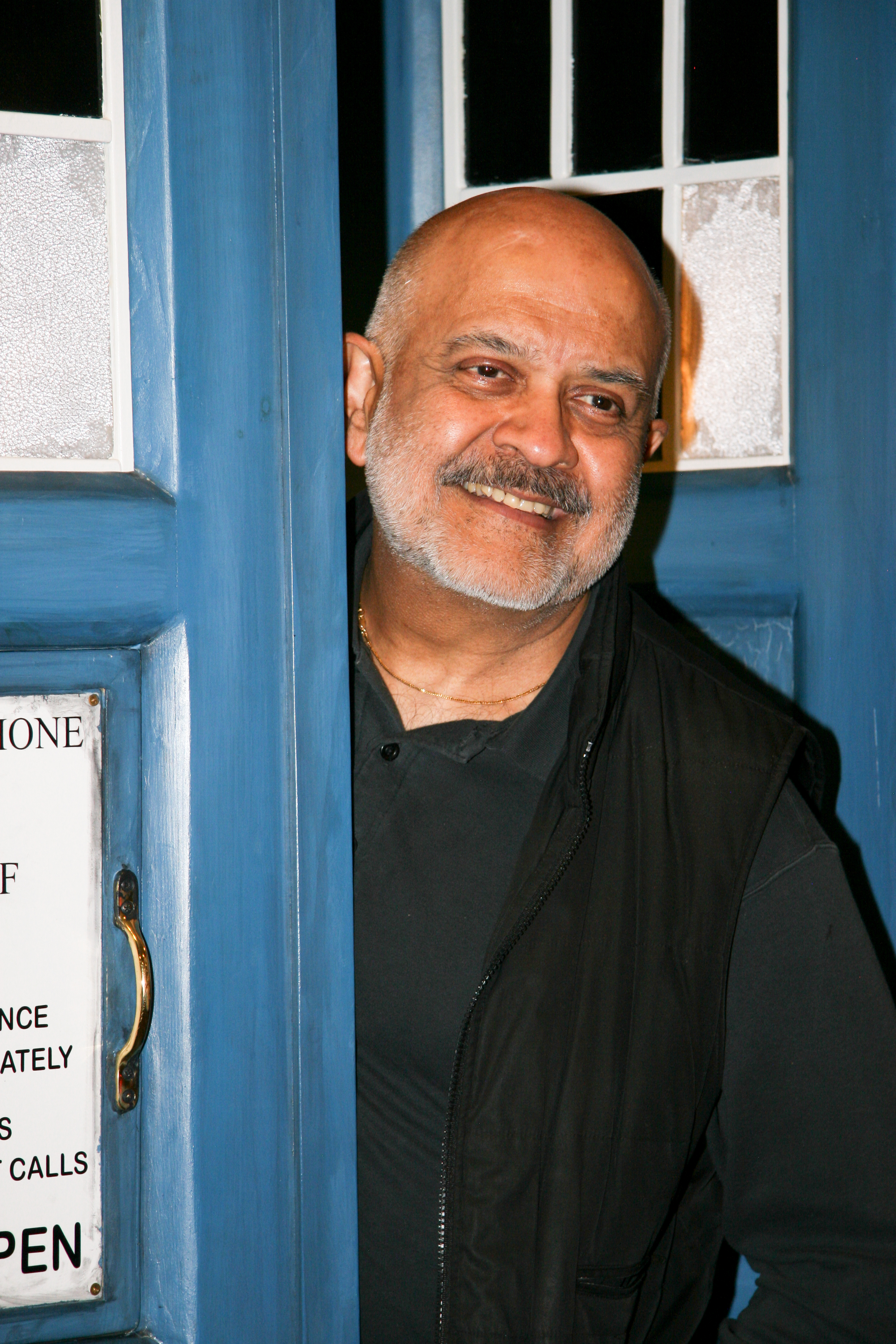
Waris Hussein, Outstanding Directing in a Variety or Music Program winner

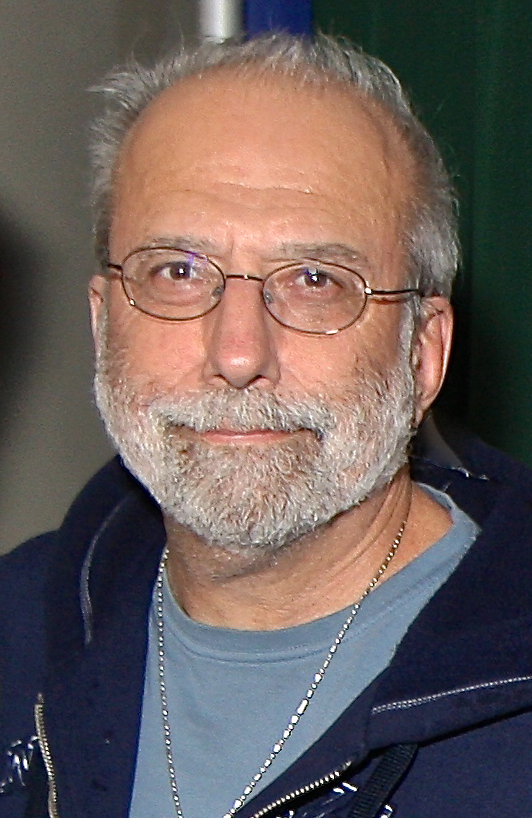
Tom Fontana, Outstanding Writing in a Drama Series co-winner

=== Programs ===
Programs
Outstanding Comedy Series: The Golden Girls (NBC); Cheers (NBC); The Cosby Show (NBC); Family Ties (NBC); Kate & Allie (CBS)	Outstanding Drama Series: Cagney & Lacey (CBS); Hill Street Blues (NBC); Moonlighting (ABC); Murder, She Wrote (CBS); St. Elsewhere (NBC)
Outstanding Drama/Comedy Special: Love Is Never Silent (NBC); Amos (CBS); Death of a Salesman (CBS); An Early Frost (NBC); Mrs. Delafield Wants to Marry (CBS)	Outstanding Miniseries: Peter the Great (NBC); Dress Gray (NBC); The Long Hot Summer (NBC); Lord Mountbatten: The Last Viceroy (PBS); On Wings of Eagles (NBC)
Outstanding Variety, Music or Comedy Program: The Kennedy Center Honors: A Celebration of the Performing Arts (CBS); The 40th Annual Tony Awards (CBS); AFI Life Achievement Award: A Tribute to Billy Wilder (NBC); Late Night with David Letterman (NBC); The Tonight Show Starring Johnny Carson (NBC)

=== Acting ===
==== Lead performances ====
Acting
Outstanding Lead Actor in a Comedy Series: Michael J. Fox as Alex P. Keaton in Family Ties (NBC) (Episode: "The Real Thing"); Harry Anderson as Judge Harry T. Stone in Night Court (NBC) (Episode: "The Wheels of Justice"); Ted Danson as Sam Malone in Cheers (NBC); Bob Newhart as Dick Loudon in Newhart (CBS); Jack Warden as Harrison Fox Sr. in Crazy Like a Fox (CBS)	Outstanding Lead Actress in a Comedy Series: Betty White as Rose Nylund in The Golden Girls (NBC) (Episode: "In a Bed of Rose's"); Bea Arthur as Dorothy Zbornak in The Golden Girls (NBC) (Episode: "The Triangle"); Shelley Long as Diane Chambers in Cheers (NBC); Rue McClanahan as Blanche Devereaux in The Golden Girls (NBC) (Episode: "The Way We Met"); Phylicia Rashad as Clair Huxtable in The Cosby Show (NBC) (Episode: "Cliff In Love")
Outstanding Lead Actor in a Drama Series: William Daniels as Dr. Mark Craig in St. Elsewhere (NBC) (Episode: "Haunted"); Ed Flanders as Dr. Donald Westphall in St. Elsewhere (NBC); Tom Selleck as Thomas Magnum in Magnum P.I. (CBS); Bruce Willis as David Addison Jr. in Moonlighting (ABC); Edward Woodward as Robert McCall in The Equalizer (CBS)	Outstanding Lead Actress in a Drama Series: Sharon Gless as Christine Cagney in Cagney & Lacey (CBS) (Episode: "The Gimp"); Tyne Daly as Mary Beth Lacey in Cagney & Lacey (CBS); Angela Lansbury as Jessica Fletcher in Murder, She Wrote (CBS); Cybill Shepherd as Madelyn Hayes in Moonlighting (ABC); Alfre Woodard as Dr. Roxanne Turner in St. Elsewhere (NBC)
Outstanding Lead Actor in a Miniseries or a Special: Dustin Hoffman as Willy Loman in Death of a Salesman (CBS); Kirk Douglas as Amos Lasher in Amos (CBS); Ben Gazzara as Nick Pierson in An Early Frost (NBC); John Lithgow as Major Kendall Laird in Resting Place (CBS); Aidan Quinn as Michael Pierson in An Early Frost (NBC)	Outstanding Lead Actress in a Miniseries or a Special: Marlo Thomas as Marie Balter in Nobody's Child (CBS); Katharine Hepburn as Margaret Delafield in Mrs. Delafield Wants to Marry (CBS); Vanessa Redgrave as Richard Radley and Renee Richards in Second Serve (CBS); Gena Rowlands as Katherine Pierson in An Early Frost (NBC); Mare Winningham as Margaret Ryder in Love Is Never Silent (NBC)

==== Supporting performances ====
Outstanding Supporting Actor in a Comedy Series: John Larroquette as Dan Fielding in Night Court (NBC) (Episode: "Best of Friends"); Tom Poston as Clayton George Utley in Newhart (CBS); John Ratzenberger as Cliff Clavin in Cheers (NBC); Malcolm-Jamal Warner as Theo Huxtable in The Cosby Show (NBC); George Wendt as Norm Peterson in Cheers (NBC)	Outstanding Supporting Actress in a Comedy Series: Rhea Perlman as Carla Tortelli in Cheers (NBC); Justine Bateman as Mallory Keaton in Family Ties (NBC); Lisa Bonet as Denise Huxtable in The Cosby Show (NBC); Julia Duffy as Stephanie Vanderkellen in Newhart (CBS); Estelle Getty as Sophia Petrillo in The Golden Girls (NBC); Keshia Knight Pulliam as Rudy Huxtable in The Cosby Show (NBC)
Outstanding Supporting Actor in a Drama Series: John Karlen as Harvey Lacey in Cagney & Lacey (CBS) (Episode: "Mothers and Sons"); Ed Begley Jr. as Dr. Victor Ehrlich in St. Elsewhere (NBC); John Hillerman as Higgins in Magnum, P.I. (CBS); Edward James Olmos as Martin Castillo in Miami Vice (NBC); Bruce Weitz as Det. Mick Belker in Hill Street Blues (NBC)	Outstanding Supporting Actress in a Drama Series: Bonnie Bartlett as Ellen Craig in St. Elsewhere (NBC) (Episode: "Haunted"); Allyce Beasley as Agnes DiPesto in Moonlighting (ABC); Christina Pickles as Nurse Helen Rosenthal in St. Elsewhere (NBC); Betty Thomas as Sgt. Lucille Bates in Hill Street Blues (NBC)
Outstanding Supporting Actor in a Miniseries or a Special: John Malkovich as Biff Loman in Death of a Salesman (CBS); Charles Durning as Charley in Death of a Salesman (CBS); John Glover as Victor DiMato in An Early Frost (NBC); Harold Gould as Dr. Marvin Elias in Mrs. Delafield Wants to Marry (CBS); Pat Morita as Tommy Tanaka in Amos (CBS)	Outstanding Supporting Actress in a Miniseries or a Special: Colleen Dewhurst as Barbara Petherton in Between Two Women (ABC); Phyllis Frelich as Janice Ryder in Love Is Never Silent (NBC); Dorothy McGuire as Hester Farrell in Amos (CBS); Vanessa Redgrave as Sophia in Peter the Great (NBC); Sylvia Sidney as Beatrice McKenna in An Early Frost (NBC)

==== Guest performances ====
Outstanding Guest Performer in a Comedy Series: Roscoe Lee Browne as Prof. Barnabus Foster in The Cosby Show (NBC) (Episode: "The Card Game"); Earle Hyman as Russell Huxtable in The Cosby Show (NBC) (Episode: "Happy Anniversary"); Danny Kaye as Dr. Burns in The Cosby Show (NBC) (Episode: "The Dentist"); Clarice Taylor as Anna Huxtable in The Cosby Show (NBC) (Episode: "Happy Anniversary"); Stevie Wonder as himself in The Cosby Show (NBC) (Episode: "A Touch of Wonder")	Outstanding Guest Performer in a Drama Series: John Lithgow as John Walters in Amazing Stories (NBC) (Episode: "The Doll"); Whoopi Goldberg as Camille in Moonlighting (ABC) (Episode: "Camille"); Edward Herrmann as Father McCabe in St. Elsewhere (NBC) (Episode: "Time Heals, Part 2"); Peggy McCay as Mrs. Carruthers in Cagney & Lacey (CBS) (Episode: "Mothers and Sons"); James Stacy as Ted Peters in Cagney & Lacey (CBS) (Episode: "The Gimp")

==== Individual performances ====
Outstanding Individual Performance in a Variety or Music Program
- Whitney Houston – The 28th Annual Grammy Awards (CBS)
  - Debbie Allen – An All-Star Celebration Honoring Martin Luther King Jr. (NBC)
  - Patti LaBelle – Great Performances: "Sylvia Fine Kaye's Musical Comedy Tonight III" (PBS)
  - Jon Lovitz – Saturday Night Live (NBC)
  - Sarah Vaughan – The 28th Annual Grammy Awards (CBS)
  - Stevie Wonder – An All-Star Celebration Honoring Martin Luther King Jr. (NBC)

=== Directing ===
Directing
Outstanding Directing in a Comedy Series: The Cosby Show (NBC): "Denise's Friend" – Jay Sandrich; Cheers (NBC): "The Triangle" – James Burrows; The Golden Girls (NBC): "The Heart Attack" – Jim Drake; The Golden Girls (NBC): "A Little Romance" – Terry Hughes; Kate & Allie (CBS): "Chip's Friend" – Bill Persky	Outstanding Directing in a Drama Series: Cagney & Lacey (CBS): "Parting Shots" – Georg Stanford Brown; Amazing Stories (NBC): "The Mission" – Steven Spielberg; Hill Street Blues (NBC): "Two Easy Pieces" – Gabrielle Beaumont; Moonlighting (ABC): "The Dream Sequence Always Rings Twice" – Peter Werner; Moonlighting (ABC): "My Fair David" – Will Mackenzie
Outstanding Directing in a Variety or Music Program: Copacabana (CBS) – Waris Hussein; The 58th Annual Academy Awards (ABC) – Marty Pasetta; Great Performances: "The Gospel at Colonus" (PBS) – Kirk Browning; Neil Diamond... Hello Again (CBS) – Dwight Hemion	Outstanding Directing in a Miniseries or a Special: Love Is Never Silent (NBC) – Joseph Sargent; Death of a Salesman (CBS) – Volker Schlöndorff; An Early Frost (NBC) – John Erman; The Execution of Raymond Graham (ABC) – Daniel Petrie; Resting Place (CBS) – John Korty

=== Writing ===
Writing
Outstanding Writing in a Comedy Series: The Golden Girls (NBC): "A Little Romance" – Mort Nathan and Barry Fanaro; Cheers (NBC): "2 Good 2 Be 4 Real" – Peter Casey and David Lee; The Cosby Show (NBC): "Denise's Friend" – John Markus; The Cosby Show (NBC): "Theo's Holiday" – John Markus, Carmen Finestra and Matt Williams; Family Ties (NBC): "The Real Thing, Part II" – Michael J. Weithorn; The Golden Girls (NBC): "Pilot" – Susan Harris	Outstanding Writing in a Drama Series: St. Elsewhere (NBC): "Time Heals" – John Tinker, Tom Fontana and John Masius; Hill Street Blues (NBC): "What Are Friends For?" – Dick Wolf; Moonlighting (ABC): "The Dream Sequence Always Rings Twice" – Debra Frank and Carl Sautter; Moonlighting (ABC): "Twas the Episode Before Christmas" – Glenn Gordon Caron; St. Elsewhere (NBC): "Haunted" – Story by : John Masius and Tom Fontana Teleplay by : John Tinker, Charles H. Eglee and Channing Gibson
Outstanding Writing in a Variety, Music or Comedy Program: Late Night with David Letterman Fourth Anniversary Special (NBC); The 40th Annual Tony Awards (CBS); AFI Life Achievement Award: A Tribute to Billy Wilder (NBC); Great Performances: "Sylvia Fine Kaye's Musical Comedy Tonight III" (PBS); The Tonight Show Starring Johnny Carson (NBC)	Outstanding Writing in a Miniseries or a Special: An Early Frost (NBC) – Story by : Sherman Yellen Teleplay by : Ron Cowen and Daniel Lipman; Lord Mountbatten: The Last Viceroy (PBS) – David Butler; Alex: The Life of a Child (ABC) – Carol Evan McKeand and Nigel McKeand; Anne of Green Gables (PBS): "Part I" – Kevin Sullivan and Joe Wiesenfeld; Dress Gray (NBC): "Part I" – Gore Vidal; Love Is Never Silent (NBC) – Darlene Craviotto

== Most major nominations ==
Networks with multiple major nominations (Note: "Major" constitutes the categories listed above: Program, Acting, Directing, and Writing. Does not include the technical categories.)
Network	Number of Nominations
NBC	79
CBS	39
ABC	13

Programs with multiple major nominations
Program	Category	Network	Number of Nominations
The Cosby Show	Comedy	NBC	13
St. Elsewhere	Drama	NBC	9
The Golden Girls	Comedy	NBC	9
Moonlighting	Drama	ABC	9
Cheers	Comedy	NBC	8
An Early Frost	Special	NBC	8
Cagney & Lacey	Drama	CBS	7
Death of a Salesman	Special	CBS	5
Hill Street Blues	Drama	NBC	5
Love Is Never Silent	Special	NBC	5
Amos	Special	CBS	4
Family Ties	Comedy	NBC	4
Mrs. Delafield Wants to Marry	Special	CBS	3
Newhart	Comedy	CBS	3
The 28th Annual Grammy Awards	Variety	CBS	2
The 40th Annual Tony Awards	Variety	CBS	2
AFI Life Achievement Award: A Tribute to Billy Wilder	Variety	NBC	2
An All-Star Celebration Honoring Martin Luther King Jr.	Variety	NBC	2
Amazing Stories	Drama	NBC	2
Dress Gray	Miniseries	NBC	2
Great Performances: "Sylvia Fine Kaye's Musical Comedy Tonight III"	Variety	PBS	2
Kate & Allie	Comedy	CBS	2
Lord Mountbatten: The Last Viceroy	Miniseries	PBS	2
Magnum, P.I.	Drama	CBS	2
Murder, She Wrote	Drama	CBS	2
Night Court	Comedy	NBC	2
Peter the Great	Miniseries	NBC	2
Resting Place	Special	CBS	2
The Tonight Show Starring Johnny Carson	Variety	NBC	2

== Most major awards ==
Networks with multiple major awards
Network	Number of Awards
NBC	17
CBS	10

Programs with multiple major awards
Program	Category	Network	Number of Awards
Cagney & Lacey	Drama	CBS	4
The Golden Girls	Comedy	NBC	3
St. Elsewhere	Drama	NBC	3
The Cosby Show	Comedy	NBC	2
Death of a Salesman	Special	CBS	2
Love Is Never Silent	Special	NBC	2
