= The Price (1971 film) =

1971 TV movie

- Genre: Drama
- Based on: play The Price by Arthur Miller
- Written by: Arthur Miller
- Directed by: Fielder Cook
- Starring: George C. Scott; Barry Sullivan; Colleen Dewhurst; David Burns
- Music by: Arthur B. Rubinstein
- Country of origin: United States
- Original language: English

Production
- Producer: David Susskind

Original release
- Network: NBC
- Release: March 2, 1971

The Price is a TV play directed by Fielder Cook based on Arthur Miller's play 1971 play. It was presented as part of the Hallmark Hall of Fame and broadcast on NBC on February 3, 1971.

== Synopsis ==
New York City policeman Victor Franz and his wife are in the apartment of his deceased father for the purpose of selling his property. They are joined by Victor's estranged brother, a successful physician, and a used furniture dealer. During the Great Depression, Victor had joined the police force rather than go to college to make a living in order to support his family. Despite helping his brother obtain an education, the two haven't spoken to each other in 16 years. The tensions between the two brothers come to the surface as it is revealed that they have quite different ideas about the family.

== Cast ==
- George C. Scott as Victor Franz
- Barry Sullivan as Walter Franz
- Colleen Dewhurst as Mrs Franz
- David Burns as Mr. Solomon

== Recognition ==
The Price received a positive review in the New York Times. The reviewer said that the TV movie "had the benefit of a perfect cast" and praised all four performers. "Mr. Scott was magnificent, as the police officer, a shade weary of a life that might have been more exciting but with the legacy of pride, decency and affection. As the doctor, Mr. Sullivan had a part into which he could finally sink his teeth—a cynic and opportunist who is devoured by his own bitterness."

== Awards ==
At the 1971 Emmy Awards, The Price was nominated in six categories, including Outstanding Single Program - Drama or Comedy. George C. Scott won for Outstanding Single Performance by an Actor in a Leading Role, David Burns won for Outstanding Performance by an Actor in a Supporting Role in Drama, and Fielder Cook won for Outstanding Directorial Achievement in Drama - Single Program. Colleen Dewhurst and John Clements were nominated for Outstanding Single Performance by an Actress in a Leading Role and Outstanding Achievement in Art Direction or Scenic Design - For a Dramatic Program or Feature Length Film, a Single Program of a Series or a Special Program, respectively, but did not win.
