= All Over =

All Over is a two-act play written in 1970 by Edward Albee. He had originally developed it in 1967 as a short play entitled Death, the second half of a projected double bill with another play called Life (which later became Seascape).

== Production history ==
The play premiered on Broadway at the Martin Beck Theatre on March 28, 1971, and closed on May 1, 1971, after 40 performances. The director was John Gielgud, and the cast featured Jessica Tandy (The Wife), Madeleine Sherwood (The Daughter) and Colleen Dewhurst (The Mistress).

The play was produced by the Royal Shakespeare Company at the Aldwych Theatre in London in January 1972. Directed by Peter Hall, the production starred Peggy Ashcroft (The Wife), Angela Lansbury (The Mistress),Sheila Hancock (The Daughter), Patience Collier (The Nurse), David Waller (the Son), and Sebastian Shaw (Best Friend).

Regionally, the play received a strong revival at the Hartford Stage Company (Hartford, CT), as part of its 1975-1976 season. Paul Weidner's production starred Anne Shropshire (the Wife), Myra Carter (the Mistress), Anne Lynn (the Daughter), William Prince (the Best Friend), Pirie MacDonald (the Son), Margaret Thomson (the Nurse), and David O. Petersen (the Doctor). The production was subsequently filmed for television, presented by PBS Great Performances, and aired on 28 April 1976 on WNET Channel 13 in New York. The DVD is available through the Broadway Theatre Archive series.

In February 2002, the play was again revived at the McCarter Theatre, Princeton, New Jersey. Directed by Emily Mann, the cast featured Rosemary Harris (the Wife), Pamela Nyberg (the Daughter), Michael Learned (the Mistress), William Biff McGuire (the Doctor), John Christopher Jones (the Son), John Carter (the Best Friend), and Myra Carter (the Nurse).

== Plot ==
A wife and mistress are waiting for the death of the man they both love. Their great love is a man who is wealthy and famous. The wife and mistress form an alliance in a ritual of the death watch.

== Critical response ==
Clive Barnes, in his review for The New York Times wrote "It is a lovely, poignant and deeply felt play. In no way at all is it an easy play -- this formal minuet of death, this symphony ironically celebrating death's dominion. It is not easy in its structure, a series of almost operatic arias demanding, in their precision, pin-point concentration from the audience, and it is certainly not easy in its subject matter."

Walter Kerr wrote that "The exercise at the Martin Beck is extraordinarily remote, detached, noncommittal. Its people seem to be waiting in a railroad station for the last train out, unaware that it has long since departed and the station itself is simply gathering dust and echoes while it waits to be torn down."

== Awards and nominations ==
- Tony Award, Best Actress in a Play

Colleen Dewhurst (nominee)

- Drama Desk Award, Outstanding Performance

Colleen Dewhurst (winner)
