= David Burns (actor) =

American actor (1902–1971)

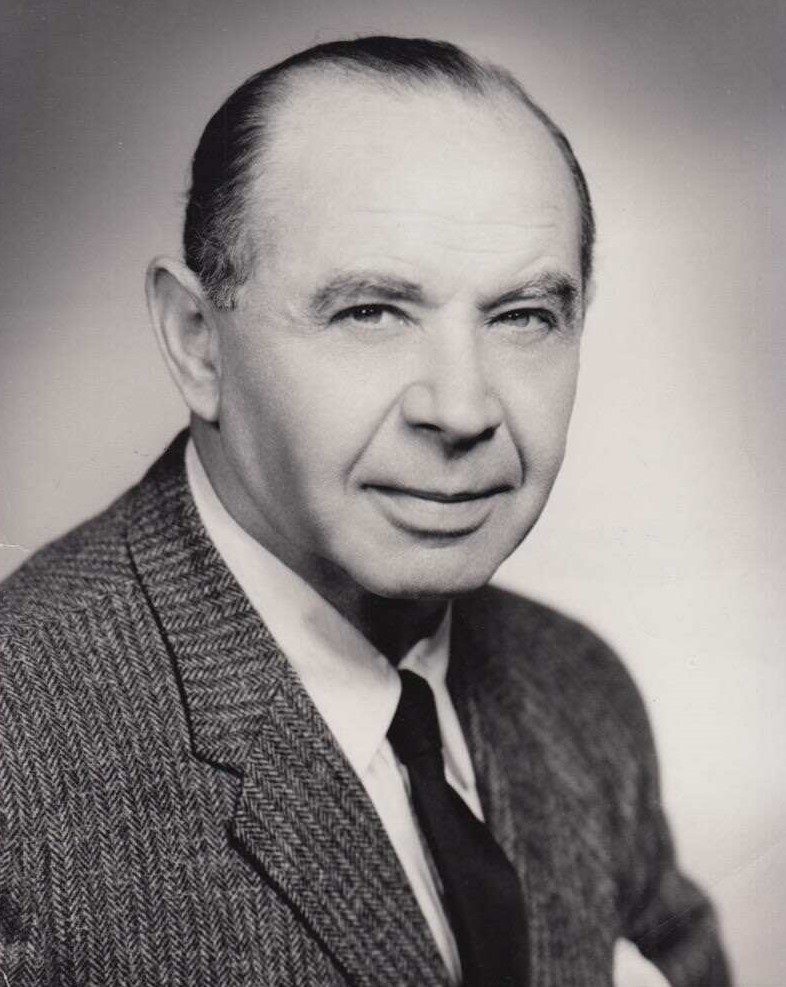
- Burns in 1967
- Born: June 22, 1902; Manhattan, New York City, U.S.
- Died: March 12, 1971 (aged 68); Philadelphia, Pennsylvania, U.S.
- Occupation: Actor
- Years active: 1918–1971
- Spouse: Mildred Todd

David Burns (June 22, 1902 – March 12, 1971) was an American Broadway theatre and motion picture actor and singer. He appeared in many comedies and musicals over a career of almost 50 years.

== Life and career ==
Burns was born in Manhattan. He made his Broadway debut in 1923 in Polly Preferred and went to London with the show in 1924. His first Broadway musical was Face the Music (1932), followed by Cole Porter's Nymph Errant (1933), staged in London.

David Burns remained in London and was featured in many motion pictures there. His New York speech pattern was distinctive and exotic to British audiences, and he lent American color to a string of comedies, musicals, and mysteries. He came back to America in 1935 for two William Powell features at Metro-Goldwyn-Mayer, but returned to England where there was far less competition for "New York" character roles. His most famous British screen credit is probably The Saint in London (1939), released as part of RKO's American Saint series of mysteries, with George Sanders as adventurer Simon Templar and David Burns as his New York sidekick. As World War II approached, making working conditions in England uncertain, Burns returned to New York in 1940. He made no further films until 1951, when he was hired for Fourteen Hours, produced on location in New York.

== Stage honors ==
Burns won two Tony Awards for Best Supporting or Featured Actor in a Musical, for his performances as "Mayor Shinn" in The Music Man (1958) and as "Senex" in A Funny Thing Happened on the Way to the Forum (1963).

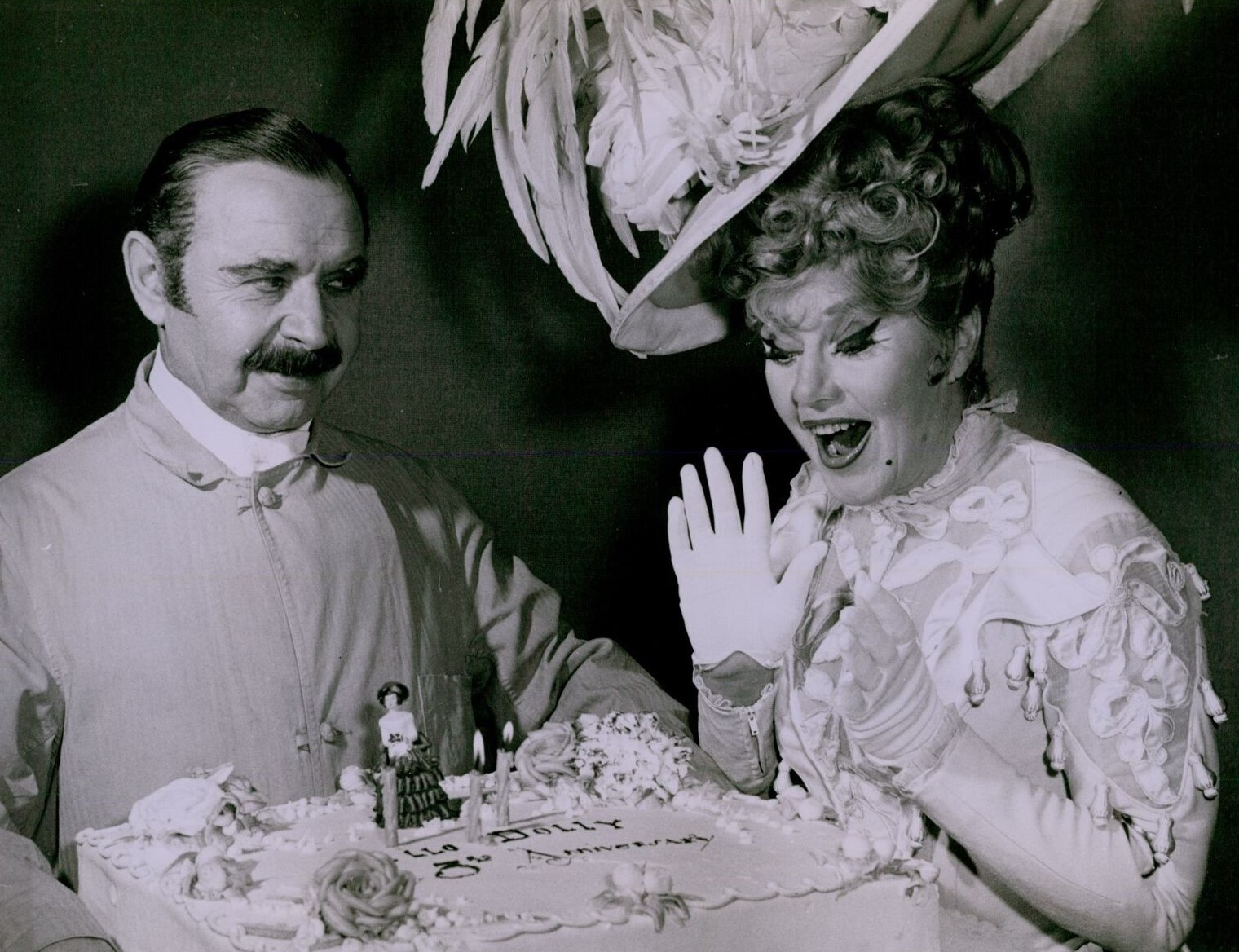
David Burns and Ginger Rogers in Hello, Dolly! on Broadway (1964)

Burns introduced the hit song "It Takes a Woman" from Hello, Dolly (1964) as the original "Horace Vandergelder".

In 1969 David Burns was featured in "Happiness Is a Rich Uncle," a musical-comedy episode of The Honeymooners on The Jackie Gleason Show. Burns's energetic comic turn as an 83-year-old millionaire, complete with facial mugging and wild movements, caused Gleason to break up during the live performance, and the script even gave Burns the final punchline. During the curtain call, Gleason complimented his pal "Davey Burns" for making him laugh so much. The show was broadcast on November 8, 1969.

Burns won a Primetime Emmy Award for Outstanding Performance by an Actor in a Supporting Role in a Drama for his role of Mr. Solomon in the 1971 TV special (Hallmark Hall of Fame) of The Price by Arthur Miller.

== Death ==
Burns died on stage on March 12, 1971, of a heart attack in Philadelphia during the out-of-town tryout of Kander and Ebb's musical 70, Girls, 70. He had just finished what the Philadelphia Inquirer described as a "rather strenuous dance step" during the musical number "Go Visit Your Grandmother," at the end of Act Two, when he collapsed during the audience applause. He was carried offstage. His lines were read by actress Lillian Roth for the remainder of the performance.

He was survived by his widow, Mildred.

== Selected credits ==
=== Stage ===
Year	Title	Role	Notes
1923	Polly Preferred	Mr. B	
1931	Wonder Boy	Harry Rich	
1932	Face the Music	Louis	Credited as "Dave Burns"
1935	Them's the Reporters	Cassady	Credited as "Dave Burns"
1939–1941	The Man Who Came to Dinner	Banjo	
1940–1941	Pal Joey	Ludlow Lowell	
1943	Oklahoma!	Ali Hakim	
1943	My Dear Public	Walters	
1945-1946	Billion Dollar Baby	Dapper Welch	
1947	I Gotta Get Out	Bernie	
1948-1949	Make Mine Manhattan	Nick/"The Good Old Days" Performer/Taxi Driver/ Mr. Rappaport/Customer	
1948	Heaven On Earth	H.H. Hutton	
1950	Alive and Kicking	Dr. Frisbee/Dr. Allen Drawbridge/Army	
1950-1951	Cole Porter's Out of This World	Niki Skolianos	
1952-1953	Two's Company	Stanley/Strombolini/Melvin/Dudley Dawson	
1953	Men of Distinction	Daniel Gaffney	
1955	Catch a Star!	Max Dillingbert	
1957	A Hole in the Head	Max	
1957-1961	The Music Man	Mayor George Shinn	
1960–1962	Do Re Mi	Brains Berman	
1962-1964	A Funny Thing Happened on the Way to the Forum	Senex	
1964	Hello, Dolly!	Horace Vandergelder	
1968–1969	The Price	Gregory Solomon	
1970	Art Buchwald's Sheep on the Runway	Ambassador Raymond Wilkins	
1970–1971	Lovely Ladies, Kind Gentlemen	Colonel Wainwright Purdy III	

=== Film ===
Year	Title	Role	Notes
1918	De Luxe Annie	Joe/Grocery Clerk	
1934	The Queen's Affair	Manager	
1934	The Path of Glory	Ginsberg	
1934	Romance in Rhythm	Mollari	
1935	Rendezvous	German-Speaking Bellhop	uncredited
1936	The Great Ziegfeld	Clarence	uncredited
1936	Crime Over London	Sniffy	
1936	Strangers on Honeymoon	Lennie	
1937	Spring Handicap	Amos	
1937	Smash and Grab	Bellini	
1937	The Live Wire	Snakey	
1938	Just like a Woman	Pedro	
1938	The Return of Carol Deane	Nick Wellington	
1938	Sidewalks of London	Hackett	
1938	Hey! Hey! USA	Tony Ricardo	
1938	The Sky's the Limit	'Ballyhoo' Bangs	
1939	The Gang's All Here	Beretti	
1939	So This Is London	Drunk	uncredited
1939	A Girl Must Live	Joe Gold	
1939	I Killed the Count	Diamond	
1939	A Gentleman's Gentleman	Alfred	
1939	The Saint in London	Dugan	
1939	She Couldn't Say No	Chester	
1951	Fourteen Hours	Cab Driver	uncredited
1954	Deep in My Heart	Lazar Berrison, Sr.	
1955	It's Always Fair Weather	Tim	
1957	Four Boys and a Gun	Television man	
1958	Once Upon a Horse...	Bruno de Gruen	
1960	Let's Make Love	Oliver Burton	
1967	The Tiger Makes Out	Mr. Ratner	
1969	How to Commit Marriage		
1970	Move	Doorman	
1971	Who Is Harry Kellerman	Leon Soloway	Posthumous release

=== Television ===
Year	Title	Role	Notes
1955	The Imogene Coca Show		Regular
1969	The Jackie Gleason Show	Uncle Howard	musical comedy with The Honeymooners

== Awards and nominations ==
Year	Award	Category	Nominated work	Result	Ref.
1966	Primetime Emmy Awards	Outstanding Performance by an Actor in a Supporting Role in a Drama	The Trials of O'Brien	Nominated	
1971	Primetime Emmy Awards	Outstanding Performance by an Actor in a Supporting Role in a Drama	Hallmark Hall of Fame (Episode: "The Price")	Won	
1958	Tony Awards	Best Supporting or Featured Actor in a Musical	The Music Man	Won	
1963	Tony Awards	Best Supporting or Featured Actor in a Musical	A Funny Thing Happened on the Way to the Forum	Won	
1971	Tony Awards	Best Leading Actor in a Musical	Lovely Ladies, Kind Gentlemen	Nominated	
