= The Price (play) =

Play written by Arthur Miller

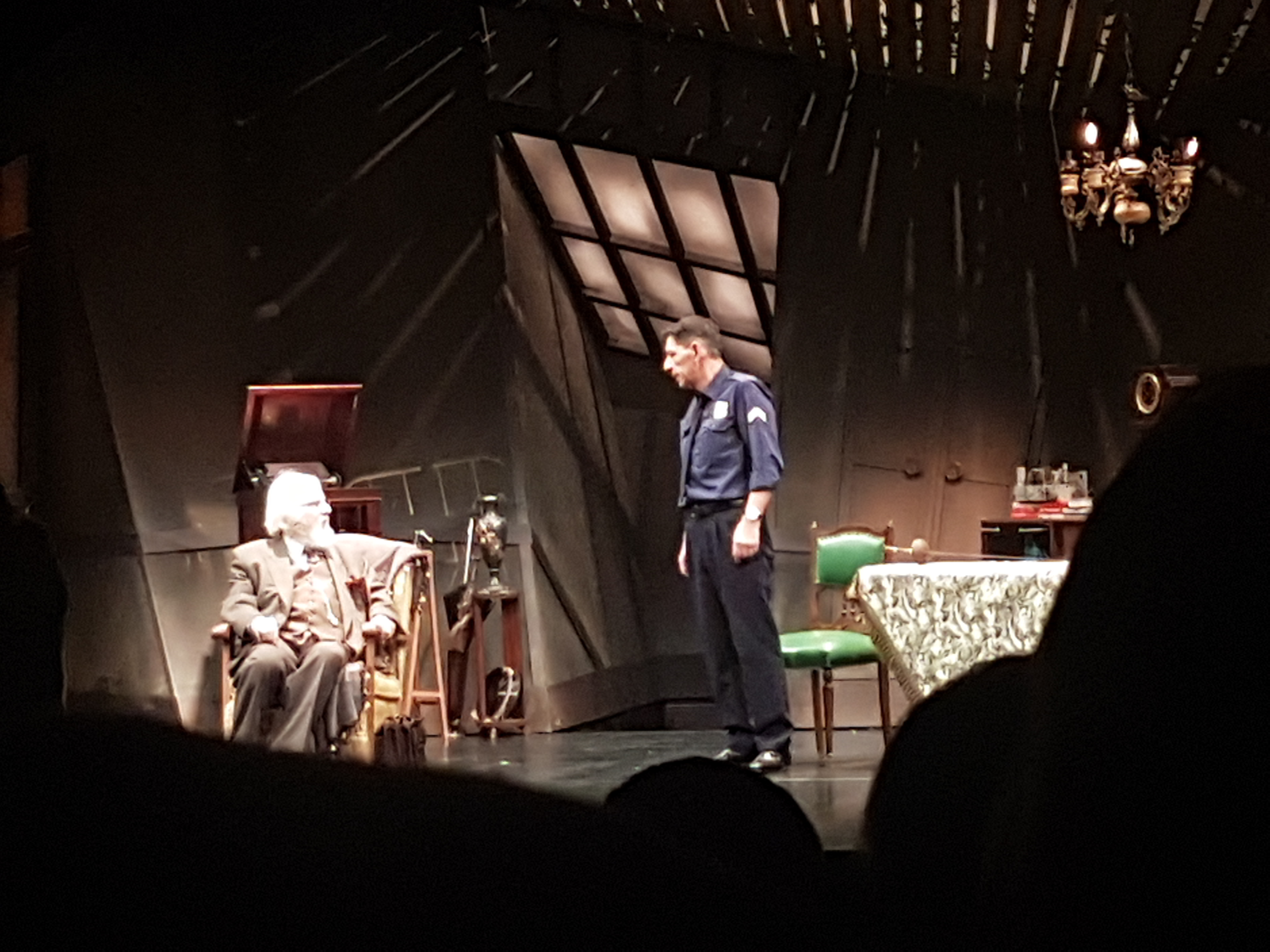
- Scene from a 2017 Greek production
- Original language: English
- Written by: Arthur Miller
- Characters: Victor Franz; Esther Franz; Gregory Solomon; Walter Franz
- Genre: Drama
- Setting: The attic of a to-be-demolished brownstone apartment building, New York City

Premiere
- Date: February 7, 1968
- Place: Morosco Theatre, New York City

The Price is a two-act play written in 1967 by Arthur Miller. It is about family dynamics, the price of furniture and the price of one's decisions. The play premiered on Broadway in 1968, and has been revived four times on Broadway. It was nominated for two 1968 Tony Awards.

Miller stated that he wrote the play as a response to the Vietnam War and the "avant-garde plays that to one or another degree fit the absurd styles."

== Productions ==
The play opened on Broadway at the Morosco Theatre on February 7, 1968 where it played until the production moved to the 46th Street Theatre on November 18, 1968. The play closed on February 15, 1969 after 429 performances. The opening cast included Harold Gary as Gregory Solomon, Pat Hingle as Victor Franz, Kate Reid as Esther Franz, and Arthur Kennedy as Walter Franz.

The Price was nominated for two 1968 Tony Awards, for Best Play (Arthur Miller, writer; Robert Whitehead, producer) and Best Scenic Design (Boris Aronson). The Price lost in the "Best Play" category to Tom Stoppard's Rosencrantz and Guildenstern Are Dead. The play was profiled in the William Goldman book The Season: A Candid Look at Broadway.

A UK revival of the play was staged from August 9 to August 25, 2018 at the Theatre Royal, Bath to mark the 50th anniversary of the original run. Directed by Jonathan Church, it starred Brendan Coyle as Victor, Sara Stewart as Esther, Adrian Lukis as Walter and David Suchet as Gregory Solomon. The production transferred to Wyndham's Theatre in London's West End from February 5 to April 27, 2019.

It was revived at the Gate Theatre (Dublin, Ireland) in 2023, directed by Conleth Hill.

It played at the Marylebone Theatre in London in 2026.

=== Production history ===
The Price has been revived four times on Broadway since the original 1968 production:

- Playhouse Theatre, June 19 to October 21, 1979, 144 performances, directed by John Stix
- Criterion Center Stage Right, June 10 to July 19, 1992, 46 performances; directed by John Tillinger; nominated for 1993 Tony Award, Best Revival
- Royale Theatre, November 15, 1999 to March 5, 2000, 128 performances; directed by James Naughton, nominated for the 2000 Tony Award, Best Revival of a Play and Drama Desk Award, Outstanding Revival of a Play
- American Airlines Theatre, February 16, 2017 to May 14, 2017, directed by Terry Kinney.
  - Mark Ruffalo as Victor Franz
  - Jessica Hecht as Esther Franz
  - Tony Shalhoub as Walter Franz
  - Danny DeVito as Gregory Solomon

Notable regional productions:

- ArtSpace at Crestwood Court, closed February 13, 2011
- Octagon Theatre, March 10 - April 2, 2011
- ACT Theatre, Seattle, Washington, May 30, 2014 to June 22, 2014
- Mark Taper Forum at the Center Theatre Group, February 11, 2015 to March 22, directed by Garry Hynes.
- Artists Repertory Theatre, March 31, 2015 to April 26, 2015
- TimeLine Theatre, Chicago, Illinois, August 2015 to November 2015
- Arena Stage, Washington, DC, October to November 2017, featuring Hal Linden as Gregory Solomon
- Theater At St Clement, New York City, February–March 2025, The Village Theater Group inaugural production.

== Casts ==
Characters	1968 Original Broadway cast	1979 Broadway revival	1992 Broadway revival	1999 Broadway Revival	2017 Broadway revival	2019 West End revival
Victor Franz	Pat Hingle	Mitchell Ryan	Hector Elizondo	Jeffrey DeMunn	Mark Ruffalo	Brendan Coyle
Esther Franz	Kate Reid	Scotty Bloch	Debra Mooney	Lizbeth MacKay	Jessica Hecht	Sara Stewart
Gregory Solomon	Harold Gary	Joseph Buloff	Eli Wallach	Bob Dishy	Danny DeVito	David Suchet
Walter Franz	Arthur Kennedy	Fritz Weaver	Joe Spano	Harris Yulin	Tony Shalhoub	Adrian Lukis

== Overview ==
After the Great Depression, Victor Franz gave up going to college to support his father. After 16 years, Victor returns to sell his parents’ estate. His wife, Esther, his brother, Walter, and a canny furniture dealer have their own agendas. Victor must finally deal with his sacrifice.

=== Characters ===
- Victor Franz - A police sergeant, eligible for retirement and approaching his fiftieth birthday. The character is based on Irving Abrams, Miller's childhood friend, who attended Columbia University and had the highest IQ on the NYC police force.
- Esther Franz - Victor's wife, it is suggested that Esther may have a problem with drinking.
- Gregory Solomon - A wily Russian-Jewish antique dealer, an nonagenarian. Michael Billington of The Guardian described the character as "a blissfully comic creation who, at first, appears to have wandered in from a Neil Simon play, but who is well aware this is his last chance to defy time."
- Walter Franz - Victor's brother, a successful doctor Victor hasn't spoken to in years.

== Adaptations ==
Цена — film by Mikhail Kalik. USSR 1969 year.

The Price was adapted for television, directed by Fielder Cook from a script by Miller, and broadcast as part of the Hallmark Hall of Fame on the NBC network on February 3, 1971. David Burns played Mr. Solomon, Colleen Dewhurst played Mrs. Franz, George C. Scott played Victor Franz, and Barry Sullivan played Walter Franz. The production was nominated for six Emmy Awards, including Outstanding Single Performance by an Actor in a Leading Role (Scott), Outstanding Performance by an Actor in a Supporting Role in Drama (Burns), Outstanding Directorial Achievement in Drama - A Single Program (Cook), and Outstanding Single Program - Drama or Comedy (David Susskind, producer). Scott and Cook won.

== Awards and nominations ==
=== Original Broadway production ===
Year	Award ceremony	Category	Nominee	Result
1968	Tony Award	Best Play		Nominated
1968	Tony Award	Best Scenic Design	Boris Aronson	Nominated
1968	Outer Critics Circle Award	Outstanding Play		Won
1968	Outer Critics Circle Award	Outstanding Performance	Harold Gray	Won

=== 1971 Television Special ===
Year	Award ceremony	Category	Nominee	Result
1971	Primetime Emmy Award	Outstanding Single Program - Drama or Comedy	David Susskind	Nominated
1971	Primetime Emmy Award	Outstanding Single Performance by an Actor in a Leading Role	George C. Scott	Won
1971	Primetime Emmy Award	Outstanding Single Performance by an Actress in a Leading Role	Colleen Dewhurst	Nominated
1971	Primetime Emmy Award	Outstanding Supporting Actor in a Drama Series	David Burns	Won
1971	Primetime Emmy Award	Outstanding Directorial Achievement in Drama - A Single Program	Fielder Cook	Won
1971	Primetime Emmy Award	Outstanding Achievement in Art Direction or Scenic Design - For a Dramatic Program or Feature Length Film, a Single Program of a Series or a Special Program	John Clements	Nominated
1972	Directors Guild of America Award	Outstanding Directorial Achievement in Movies for Television	Fielder Cook	Nominated

=== 1979 Broadway revival ===
Year	Award	Category	Nominee	Result
1980	Drama Desk Award	Outstanding Featured Actor in a Play	Fritz Weaver	Nominated

=== 1992 Broadway revival ===
Year	Award	Category	Nominee	Result
1993	Tony Award	Best Revival		Nominated
1993	Drama Desk Award	Outstanding Revival of a Play		Nominated
1993	Drama Desk Award	Outstanding Featured Actor in a Play	Eli Wallach	Nominated

=== 1999 Broadway revival ===
Year	Award ceremony	Category	Nominee	Result
2000	Tony Award	Best Revival of a Play		Nominated
2000	Drama Desk Award	Outstanding Revival of a Play	Arthur Miller	Nominated
2000	Drama Desk Award	Outstanding Featured Actor in a Play	Harris Yulin	Nominated
2000	Outer Critics Circle Award	Outstanding Featured Actor in a Play	Bob Dishy	Nominated
2000	Outer Critics Circle Award	Outstanding Featured Actress in a Play	Lizbeth MacKay	Nominated

=== 2017 Broadway revival ===
Year	Award	Category	Nominee	Result
2017	Tony Award	Best Performance by a Featured Actor in a Play	Danny DeVito	Nominated
2017	Drama Desk Award	Outstanding Featured Actor in a Play	Danny DeVito	Won
2017	Outer Critics Circle Award	Outstanding Revival of a Play		Nominated
2017	Outer Critics Circle Award	Outstanding Featured Actor in a Play	Danny DeVito	Won
2017	Drama League Award	Outstanding Revival of a Play		Nominated
2017	Drama League Award	Distinguished Performance	Danny DeVito	Nominated

=== 2019 West End revival ===
Year	Award	Category	Nominee	Result
2019	Laurence Olivier Award	Best Revival	Wyndham's Theatre	Nominated
2019	Laurence Olivier Award	Best Actor	David Suchet	Nominated
2019	Laurence Olivier Award	Best Actor in a Supporting Role	Adrian Lukis	Nominated
