= 23rd Primetime Emmy Awards =

1971 American television programming awards

- Date: May 9, 1971
- Location: Pantages Theatre, Los Angeles, California
- Presented by: Academy of Television Arts and Sciences
- Hosted by: Johnny Carson

Highlights
- Most awards: The Bold Ones: The Senator; The Mary Tyler Moore Show (4)
- Most nominations: The Mary Tyler Moore Show (8)
- Outstanding Comedy Series: All in the Family
- Outstanding Drama Series: The Bold Ones: The Senator
- Outstanding Single Program - Drama or Comedy: The Andersonville Trial
- Outstanding Variety Series - Musical: The Flip Wilson Show
- Outstanding Variety Series - Talk: The David Frost Show

Television/radio coverage
- Network: NBC

The 23rd Emmy Awards, later known as the 23rd Primetime Emmy Awards, were handed out on May 9, 1971. The ceremony was hosted by Johnny Carson. 32 awards were presented. Winners are listed in bold and series' networks are in parentheses.

The top shows of the night were All in the Family and The Bold Ones: The Senator. The Mary Tyler Moore Show had the most major nominations (eight) and tied with The Bold Ones: The Senator for the most wins (four) of the night.

Actress Lee Grant set an Emmy milestone when she joined the exclusive club of actors who were nominated for two performances in the same acting category. She won the award for Outstanding Single Performance by an Actress in a Leading Role, for her performance in The Neon Ceiling, she was also nominated for an episode of Columbo.

Susan Hampshire became PBS' first win in the Lead Actress, Drama category, for The First Churchills, as well as being the network's first ever Acting win. (Hampshire also won in the same category, the previous year, again beating the Big Three television networks, but from the NET network, a network which dissolved within a year, but became the direct predecessor for PBS.)

David Burns became the second posthumous performance in Emmy history to win for ITV Sunday Night Theatre.

== Winners and nominees ==
=== Programs ===
Programs
**Outstanding Series - Comedy**: **All in the Family (CBS)**; Arnie (CBS); Love, American Style (ABC); The Mary Tyler Moore Show (CBS); The Odd Couple (ABC)	**Outstanding Series - Drama**: **The Bold Ones: The Senator (NBC)**; The First Churchills (PBS); Ironside (NBC); Marcus Welby, M.D. (ABC); NET Playhouse (PBS)
**Outstanding Variety Series - Musical**: **The Flip Wilson Show (NBC)**; The Carol Burnett Show (CBS); Rowan & Martin's Laugh-In (NBC)	**Outstanding Variety Series - Talk**: **The David Frost Show (Syndicated)**; The Dick Cavett Show (ABC); The Tonight Show Starring Johnny Carson (NBC)
**Outstanding Single Program - Variety or Musical - Variety and Popular Music**: **Singer Presents Burt Bacharach (CBS)**; Another Evening with Burt Bacharach (NBC); Harry and Lena (ABC)	**Outstanding Single Program - Variety or Musical - Classical Music**: **NET Festival: "Leopold Stokowski" (PBS)**; NET Fanfare: "Swan Lake" (PBS); NET Opera Theater: "Queen of Spades" (PBS)
**Outstanding Achievement in Daytime Programming - Programs**: **Today (NBC)**; The Galloping Gourmet (Syndicated)	**Outstanding Achievement in Children's Programming - Programs**: **Sesame Street (PBS)**; Kukla, Fran and Ollie (PBS)
**Outstanding Achievement in Sports Programming**: **ABC's Wide World of Sports (ABC) – Roone Arledge**; **ABC's Wide World of Sports (ABC) – Jim McKay**; **NFL Monday Night Football (ABC) – Don Meredith**; 34th Masters Tournament (CBS); NCAA Football (ABC); NFL Monday Night Football (ABC) – Roone Arledge and Chet Forte	**Outstanding Single Program - Drama or Comedy**: **The Andersonville Trial (PBS)**; Hallmark Hall of Fame: "Hamlet" (NBC); Hallmark Hall of Fame: "The Price" (NBC); Night Gallery: "They're Tearing Down Tim Riley's Bar" (NBC); Vanished (NBC)
**Outstanding New Series**: **All in the Family (CBS)**; The Bold Ones: The Senator (NBC); The Flip Wilson Show (NBC); The Mary Tyler Moore Show (CBS); The Odd Couple (ABC)

=== Acting ===
==== Lead performances ====
Acting
**Outstanding Continued Performance** **by an Actor in a Leading Role in a Comedy Series**: **Jack Klugman as Oscar Madison in The Odd Couple (ABC)**; Ted Bessell as Donald Hollinger in That Girl (ABC); Bill Bixby as Tom Corbett in The Courtship of Eddie's Father (ABC); Carroll O'Connor as Archie Bunker in All in the Family (CBS); Tony Randall as Felix Unger in The Odd Couple (ABC)	**Outstanding Continued Performance** **by an Actress in a Leading Role in a Comedy Series**: **Jean Stapleton as Edith Bunker in All in the Family (CBS)**; Mary Tyler Moore as Mary Richards in The Mary Tyler Moore Show (CBS); Marlo Thomas as Ann Marie in That Girl (ABC)
**Outstanding Continued Performance** **by an Actor in a Leading Role in a Dramatic Series**: **Hal Holbrook as Senator Hays Stowe in The Bold Ones: The Senator (NBC)**; Raymond Burr as Robert T. Ironside in Ironside (NBC); Mike Connors as Joe Mannix in Mannix (CBS); Robert Young as Marcus Welby in Marcus Welby, M.D. (ABC)	**Outstanding Continued Performance** **by an Actress in a Leading Role in a Dramatic Series**: **Susan Hampshire as Sarah Churchill, Duchess of Marlborough in The First Churchills (PBS)**; Linda Cristal as Victoria Montoya in The High Chaparral (NBC); Peggy Lipton as Julie Barnes in The Mod Squad (ABC)

==== Supporting performances ====
**Outstanding Performance by an Actor in a Supporting Role in a Comedy**: **Edward Asner as Lou Grant in The Mary Tyler Moore Show (CBS)**; Michael Constantine as Seymour Kaufman in Room 222 (ABC); Gale Gordon as Harrison Carter in Here's Lucy (CBS)	**Outstanding Performance by an Actress in a Supporting Role in a Comedy**: **Valerie Harper as Rhoda Morgenstern in The Mary Tyler Moore Show (CBS) (Episode: "Support Your Local Mother")**; Agnes Moorehead as Endora in Bewitched (ABC); Karen Valentine as Alice Johnson in Room 222 (ABC)
**Outstanding Performance by an Actor in a Supporting Role in a Drama**: **David Burns as Mr. Solomon in Hallmark Hall of Fame: "The Price" (NBC)**; James Brolin as Dr. Steven Kiley in Marcus Welby, M.D. (ABC); Robert Young as Senator Earl Gannon in Vanished (NBC)	**Outstanding Performance by an Actress in a Supporting Role in a Drama**: **Margaret Leighton as Gertrude in Hallmark Hall of Fame: "Hamlet" (NBC)**; Gail Fisher as Peggy Fair in Mannix (CBS); Susan Saint James as Peggy Maxwell in The Name of the Game (NBC); Elena Verdugo as Consuelo Lopez in Marcus Welby, M.D. (ABC)

==== Single performances ====
**Outstanding Single Performance by an Actor in a Leading Role**: **George C. Scott as Victor Franz in Hallmark Hall of Fame: "The Price" (NBC)**; Jack Cassidy as Otis Baker in The Andersonville Trial (PBS); Hal Holbrook as Senator Hays Stowe in A Clear and Present Danger (NBC); Richard Widmark as President Paul Roudebush in Vanished (NBC); Gig Young as Jones in The Neon Ceiling (NBC)	**Outstanding Single Performance by an Actress in a Leading Role**: **Lee Grant as Carrie Miller in The Neon Ceiling (NBC)**; Colleen Dewhurst as Mrs. Franz in Hallmark Hall of Fame: "The Price" (NBC); Lee Grant as Leslie Williams in Ransom for a Dead Man (NBC)

=== Directing ===
Directing
**Outstanding Directorial Achievement in Comedy**: **The Mary Tyler Moore Show (CBS): "Toulouse Lautrec is One of My Favorite Artists" – Jay Sandrich**; All in the Family (CBS): "Gloria's Pregnancy" – John Rich; The Mary Tyler Moore Show (CBS): "Support Your Local Mother" – Alan Rafkin	**Outstanding Directorial Achievement in Drama -** **A Single Program of a Series with Continuing Characters and/or Theme**: **The Bold Ones: The Senator (NBC): "The Day the Lion Died" – Daryl Duke**; The Bold Ones: The Senator (NBC): "A Single Blow of a Sword" – John Badham; Hawaii Five-O (CBS): "Over Fifty? Steal!" – Bob Sweeney
**Outstanding Directorial Achievement in Comedy, Variety or Music**: **Peggy Fleming at Sun Valley (NBC) – Sterling Johnson**; George M! (NBC) – Walter C. Miller and Martin Charnin; Young People's Concerts: Anatomy of a Symphony Orchestra (CBS) – Roger Englander	**Outstanding Directorial Achievement in Variety or Music**: **Rowan & Martin's Laugh-In (NBC): "Orson Welles" – Mark Warren**; The Andy Williams Show (NBC): "Christmas Show" – Art Fisher; The Flip Wilson Show (NBC): "David Frost, James Brown and The Muppets" – Tim Kiley
**Outstanding Directorial Achievement in Drama - A Single Program**: **Hallmark Hall of Fame: "The Price" (NBC) – Fielder Cook**; A Clear and Present Danger (NBC) – James Goldstone; Hallmark Hall of Fame: "Hamlet" (NBC) – Peter Wood; Tribes (ABC) – Joseph Sargent

=== Writing ===
Writing
**Outstanding Writing Achievement in Comedy**: **The Mary Tyler Moore Show (CBS): "Support Your Local Mother" – Allan Burns and James L. Brooks**; All in the Family (CBS): "Meet the Bunkers" – Norman Lear; All in the Family (CBS): "Oh, My Aching Back" – Stanley Ralph Ross; Here's Lucy (CBS): "Lucy Meets the Burtons" – Bob Carroll Jr. and Madelyn Davis	**Outstanding Writing Achievement in Drama**: **The Bold Ones: The Senator (NBC): "To Taste of Death But Once" – Joel Oliansky**; The Bold Ones: The Senator (NBC): "A Continual Roar of Musketry" – David W. Rintels; Four in One (NBC): "The Psychiatrist" – Jerrold Freedman
**Outstanding Writing Achievement in Comedy, Variety or Music**: **Singer Presents Burt Bacharach (CBS)**; The Doris Mary Anne Kappelhoff Special (CBS); Jack Benny's Twentieth Anniversary Special (NBC)	**Outstanding Writing Achievement in Variety or Music**: **The Flip Wilson Show (NBC): "Lena Horne and Tony Randall"**; The Carol Burnett Show (CBS): "Rita Hayworth"; Kraft Music Hall (NBC): "Kopykats Kopy TV"
**Outstanding Writing Achievement in Drama - Original Teleplay**: **Tribes (ABC) – Tracy Keenan Wynn and Marvin Schwartz**; The Brotherhood of the Bell (CBS) – David Karp; San Francisco International Airport (NBC) – William Read Woodfield and Allan Balter	**Outstanding Writing Achievement in Drama - Adaptation**: **The Andersonville Trial (PBS) – Saul Levitt**; Hallmark Hall of Fame: "Hamlet" (NBC) – John Barton; Vanished (NBC) – Dean Riesner

== Most major nominations ==
Networks with multiple major nominations (Note: "Major" constitutes the categories listed above: Program, Acting, Directing, and Writing. Does not include the technical categories.)
Network	Number of Nominations
NBC	46
CBS	29
ABC	23
PBS	11

Programs with multiple major nominations
Program	Category	Network	Number of Nominations
The Mary Tyler Moore Show	Comedy	CBS	8
All in the Family	Comedy	CBS	7
The Bold Ones: The Senator	Drama	NBC	7
The Price	Special	NBC	5
The Flip Wilson Show	Variety	NBC	4
Hamlet	Special	NBC	4
Marcus Welby, M.D.	Drama	ABC	4
The Odd Couple	Comedy	ABC	4
Vanished	Special	NBC	4
The Andersonville Trial	Special	PBS	3
The Carol Burnett Show	Variety	CBS	2
The Churchills	Drama	PBS	2
A Clear and Present Danger	Special	NBC	2
Here's Lucy	Comedy	CBS	2
Ironside	Drama	NBC	2
Mannix	Drama	CBS	2
NFL Monday Night Football	Sports	ABC	2
The Neon Ceiling	Special	NBC	2
Room 222	Comedy	ABC	2
Rowan & Martin's Laugh-In	Variety	NBC	2
Singer Presents Burt Bacharach	Variety	CBS	2
That Girl	Comedy	ABC	2
Tribes	Special	ABC	2
Wide World of Sports	Sports	ABC	2

== Most major awards ==
Networks with multiple major awards
Network	Number of Awards
NBC	14
CBS	9
PBS	5
ABC	3

Programs with multiple major awards
Programs	Category	Network	Number of Awards
The Bold Ones: The Senator	Drama	NBC	4
The Mary Tyler Moore Show	Comedy	CBS	4
All in the Family	Comedy	CBS	3
The Price	Special	NBC	3
The Andersonville Trial	Special	PBS	2
The Flip Wilson Show	Variety	NBC	2
Singer Presents Burt Bacharach	Variety	CBS	2
Wide World of Sports	Sports	ABC	2
