= Marilyn French =

American feminist author (1929–2009)

- Born: Marilyn Edwards; November 21, 1929; New York City, U.S.
- Died: May 2, 2009 (aged 79); New York City, U.S.
- Education: Hofstra University (BA, MA); Harvard University (PhD)
- Occupations: Author; professor; lecturer
- Spouse: Robert M. French Jr (m. 1950; div. 1967)
- Children: 2

Marilyn French (née Edwards; November 21, 1929 – May 2, 2009) was an American radical feminist author, most widely known for her second book and first novel, the 1977 work The Women's Room.

== Life ==
French was born in Brooklyn to E. Charles Edwards, an engineer, and Isabel Hazz Edwards, a department store clerk. In her youth, she was a journalist, writing a neighborhood newsletter. She played the piano and dreamed of becoming a composer. She received a bachelor's degree from Hofstra University (then Hofstra College) in 1951, in philosophy and English literature. Marilyn Edwards married Robert M. French Jr. in 1950 and supported him while he attended law school. The couple had two children. French also received a master's degree in English from Hofstra, in 1964. She divorced Robert French in 1967 and then pursued a doctorate at Harvard University, where she earned a PhD in 1972 on the thesis of The Book as World: James Joyce's Ulysses.

French was diagnosed with esophageal cancer in 1992. This experience was the basis for her book A Season in Hell: A Memoir (1998). She survived cancer and later died from heart failure at age 79, on May 2, 2009, in Manhattan.

== Career ==
=== Teaching ===
French was an English instructor at Hofstra, from 1964 to 1968, and was an assistant professor of English at the College of the Holy Cross in Worcester, Massachusetts, from 1972 to 1976.

=== Political views and written works ===
In her works, French asserted that women's oppression is an intrinsic part of the male-dominated global culture. For instance, one of her first non-fiction works, Beyond Power: On Women, Men and Morals (1985), in which she traces and analyses the history of gender relations from early matrifocal societies to the lives of women and men "in the age of patriarchy". French took issue with the expectations of married women in the post-World War II era and became a leading, if controversial, opinion maker on gender issues who decried the patriarchal society she saw around her. "My goal in life is to change the entire social and economic structure of Western civilization, to make it a feminist world," she once declared.

French's first and best-known novel, The Women's Room (1977), follows the lives of Mira and her friends in 1950s and 1960s America, including Val, a militant radical feminist. The novel portrays the details of the lives of women at this time and the feminist movement of this era in the United States. At one point in the book the character Val declares in a moment of extreme anger, over her friend Mira's protests, that "all men are rapists, and that's all they are. They rape us with their eyes, their laws, and their codes." French made it clear elsewhere that these were not her own beliefs, but critics of radical feminism have often attributed the view to French herself, without noting that the quote was drawn from one of many fictional characters in a novel. The Women's Room sold more than 20 million copies and was translated into more than 20 languages. Gloria Steinem, a close friend, compared the impact of the book on the discussion surrounding women's rights to the one that Ralph Ellison's Invisible Man (1952) had had on racial equality 25 years earlier.

Her most significant work in later life was From Eve to Dawn: A History of Women. It was published in a Dutch translation in 1995 (in one volume of 1312 pages), but did not appear in English until 2002 and 2003 (published in three volumes by Mcarthur & Company), and then again in English in four volumes (published by The Feminist Press) in 2008. It is built around the premise that exclusion from the prevailing intellectual histories denied women their past, present and future. Despite carefully chronicling a long history of oppression, the last volume ends on an optimistic note, said Florence Howe, who recently retired as director of the publishing house. "For the first time women have history," she said of Ms. French's work. "The world changed and she helped change it."

While French was pleased by significant gains made by women in the three decades since her landmark novel, The Women's Room, she was also just as quick to point out lingering deficiencies in gender equality.

== Selected works ==
- The Book as World: James Joyce's Ulysses. Harvard University Press. May 1976. ISBN 978-0-674-07853-6.
- The Women's Room. Ballantine Books. 1977. ISBN 0-345-35361-7.
- The Bleeding Heart. Simon & Schuster. February 1980. ISBN 978-0-671-44784-7.
- Shakespeare's Division of Experience. Simon & Schuster. March 1981. ISBN 978-0-671-44865-3.
- Beyond Power: On Women, Men, and Morals. Olympic Marketing Corp. June 1985. ISBN 978-0-671-49959-4.
- Her Mother's Daughter. Summit Books. October 1987. ISBN 978-0-671-63051-5.
- The War Against Women. Summit Books. 1992. ASIN B001KL7D8A.
- Our Father. Little Brown & Co (T). January 1994. ISBN 978-0-316-29390-7.
- Een vrouwelijk geschiedenis van de wereld [Women's History of the World] (in Dutch). Translated by Viviane Franken. Amsterdam: Meulenhoff. 1995.
- My Summer with George. Knopf. August 6, 1996. ISBN 978-0-679-44774-0.
- A Season in Hell: A Memoir. Knopf. September 14, 1998. ISBN 978-0-679-45509-7.
- Howe, Florence; Casella, Jean (May 1, 2000). Almost Touching the Skies: Women's Coming of Age Stories. Introduction by Marilyn French. The Feminist Press at CUNY. ISBN 978-1-55861-233-4.
- From Eve to Dawn: A History of Women in Three Volumes (2003), non-fiction:
  - From Eve to Dawn: Origins. Vol. 1. Mcarthur & Company. June 10, 2003. ISBN 978-1-55278-268-2.
  - From Eve to Dawn: The Masculine Mystique. Vol. 2. Mcarthur & Company. June 10, 2003. ISBN 978-1-55278-346-7.
  - From Eve to Dawn: Paradise and Infernoes. Vol. 3. Mcarthur & Company. June 10, 2003. ISBN 978-1-55278-323-8.
- In the Name of Friendship. The Feminist Press at CUNY. May 1, 2006. ISBN 978-1-55861-521-2.
- From Eve to Dawn, A History of Women in the World (2008) in four volumes:
  - From Eve to Dawn, A History of the Women in the World, Volume I: Origins: From Prehistory to the First Millennium. Foreword by Margaret Atwood. The Feminist Press at CUNY. April 1, 2008. ISBN 978-1-55861-565-6.
  - From Eve to Dawn, A History of Women in the World, Volume II: The Masculine Mystique: From Feudalism to the French Revolution. Foreword by Margaret Atwood. The Feminist Press at CUNY. April 1, 2008. ISBN 978-1-55861-567-0.
  - From Eve to Dawn, A History of Women in the World, Volume III: Infernos and Paradises, The Triumph of Capitalism in the 19th Century. Foreword by Margaret Atwood. Feminist Press at the City University of New York. April 1, 2008. ISBN 978-1-55861-583-0.
  - From Eve to Dawn, A History of Women in the World, Volume IV: Revolutions and Struggles for Justice in the 20th Century. Foreword by Margaret Atwood. The Feminist Press at CUNY. April 1, 2008. ISBN 978-1-55861-584-7.
- The Love Children (Classic Feminist Writers). The Feminist Press at CUNY. September 1, 2009. ASIN B00305CYI8. (published posthumously)

== In popular culture ==
- Marilyn French is mentioned in ABBA's song "The Day Before You Came" (1982), in the lyric: "I must have read a while, the latest one by Marilyn French or something in that style".
