= The Women's Room =

1977 novel by Marilyn French

- Cover of the first edition
- Author: Marilyn French
- Language: English
- Genre: Feminist fiction
- Publisher: Summit Books (Simon & Schuster)
- Publication date: 1977
- Publication place: United States
- Media type: Print (hardcover and paperback)
- ISBN: 0-671-40010-X
- OCLC: 3089386

The Women's Room is the debut novel by American feminist author Marilyn French, published in 1977. It launched French as a major participant in the feminist movement and, while French states it is not autobiographical, the book reflects many autobiographical elements. For example, French, like the main character, Mira, was married and divorced, and then attended Harvard where she obtained a Ph.D. in English Literature. Despite the connection of The Women's Room to the feminist movement, French stated in a 1977 interview with The New York Times: "The Women's Room is not about the women's movement ... but about women's lives today."

The Women's Room has been described as one of the most influential novels of the modern feminist movement. Its instant popularity brought criticism from some well-known feminists that it was too pessimistic about women's lives and anti-men.

The Women's Room is set in 1950s America and follows the fortunes of Mira Ward, a woman in a traditional marriage, and her gradual feminist awakening. The novel met stark media criticism when published but went on to be an international best seller.

== Historical context ==
The Women's Room was published in 1977, but the novel is written as a reflective work, following the main character, Mira, from adolescence in the late 1940s to adulthood and independence in the 1960s.

Mira's primary childbearing years were in the 1950s, during the Baby Boom. Though she had only two children, many of her friends throughout the novel had three or more.

The 1950s was also a period in which American women were expected to be housewives, to prioritize their roles as wives and mothers before anything else, and to dutifully serve their families and find happiness inside their homes and marriages, rather than in a career.

Second-wave feminism emerged in the 1960s. This movement focused on a multitude of issues ranging from women gaining control over their sexuality to women having equality in the workplace. In The Feminine Mystique (1963), Betty Friedan refers to one of those issues as "the problem that has no name". The Women's Room encompasses many ideas central to this movement, and Mira experiences much of the dissatisfaction common to housewives, discussed in The Feminine Mystique.

== Major characters ==
- Mira is the main character of the novel. Her life is followed from her teenage years into adulthood, during which time she undergoes several transformations.
- Norm is Mira's husband and father of her two children, Normie and Clark. Norm is a doctor and spends a limited amount of time at home with Mira and the children.
- Martha is Mira's closest friend during her life as a housewife with Norm. Martha and Mira are able to sympathize with each other's respective situations as trapped housewives.
- Val is Mira's closest friend in Cambridge. She introduces Mira to second-wave feminist ideas, and Val's comments are some of the most radical in the novel.
- Ben is Mira's love interest. He helps her find sexual satisfaction and independence in a relationship.

== Plot ==
Mira and her friends represent a wide cross-section of American society in the 1950s and 1960s. Mira herself is from a middle-class background. She is mildly rebellious in that she disagrees with her mother's view of the world. In her late teens she dates a fellow student named Lanny; one night, when she was supposed to be out on a date with him, Lanny ignores her, and in response Mira dances with several men. Mira's actions in this instance gain her a reputation for being loose. Through this experience and several others with Lanny, Mira realizes she does not want to marry him because he would leave her at home, alone, scrubbing floors.

Later, Mira marries Norm, a future doctor. Mira and Norm have two sons, Norm, Jr. (referred to as Normie throughout the book) and Clark. During the first few years of her marriage, Mira develops friendships with three neighborhood women: Natalie, Adele, and Bliss—all of whom are married with children. The women begin to throw dinner parties in order to create fun evenings together that involve their husbands. At the dinner parties there is flirtation among the different couples. Natalie begins to believe that her husband and Mira are having an affair, but Mira is able to dismiss Natalie's accusation, and their bonds survive until Mira discovers that Bliss and Natalie are having affairs with Adele's husband. The suspicion and actuality of affairs within the group results in irreversible damage to their friendships.

Mira and Norm later move to the small town of Beau Reve, where Mira meets fellow married women with children: Lily, Samantha, and Martha. During this time Mira's marriage becomes increasingly routine, and Mira finds herself at home, alone, scrubbing floors. Also while in Beau Reve, Mira witnesses her friends' struggles: Lily goes mad as a result of her son's rebellious behavior, Samantha is evicted after her husband loses his job and leaves her, and Martha takes a married lover who simultaneously gets his wife pregnant. Through her friends, Mira begins to understand the unfair advantages enjoyed by men in relationships.

After many years of marriage, Norm files for divorce (it is hinted that he has been having an affair for some time) and remarries, leaving Mira on her own. During this time, Mira, lost without her routine life of wifely duties, attempts to commit suicide. She is found by Martha, who helps her pick herself up. Mira returns the help in due time when Martha, too, attempts suicide when trying to deal with her failed affair and resulting divorce.

Following her and Norm's divorce, Mira goes to Harvard University to study for a Ph.D. in English literature, with which she hopes to fulfill her lifelong dream of teaching. There she meets Val, a militant radical feminist divorcée with a "precocious" teenage daughter, Chris. It is the heyday of Women's Liberation and Mira, now too, finally able to verbalize her discontent at the society around her, becomes a feminist, although a less radical and militant one than Val. Their circle includes Isolde (a lesbian divorcée), Kyla (married to Harley), and Clarissa (married to Duke). It also includes Ben, a diplomat to the fictional African nation of Lianu, with whom Mira begins a relationship.

Mira and Ben have a happy relationship, in which Mira is able to maintain a sense of independence. Mira's development in the relationship contributes to her new unwillingness to live the life of a stereotypical housewife. When Mira's children come to visit her at Harvard, her growth and independence is revealed by a clear change in her views on the dichotomy between motherhood and sexuality.

While at college, Val's daughter, Chris, is raped. Following Chris' rape, Val states (over Mira's protests), "Whatever they may be in public life, whatever their relationships with men, in their relationships with women, all men are rapists, and that's all they are. They rape us with their eyes, their laws, and their codes."

Mira later ends her relationship with Ben, after realizing that he expects her to return to Lianu with him and bear his children. Soon afterward, she discovers that Val has been shot following an attempt to free a woman from the police who had been convicted of murder for stabbing a man who was trying to rape her.

The book ends with a brief summary of where the characters are now. Ben married his secretary and now has two children. Mira is teaching at a small community college and is not dating anyone. The ending is also a doubling back in which the narrator begins to write the story the reader has just read.

== Reception ==
The Women's Room received both praise and criticism. The novel was a New York Times bestseller the year it was released, 1977. In June 2004, a sample of 500 people attending the Guardian Hay Festival included The Women's Room in their list of the top 50 essential contemporary reads, demonstrating that time has not diminished the importance of French's novel, and as of 2009, The Women's Room sold over 20 million copies and was translated into 20 languages.

Many women found The Women's Room relatable and stimulating; they were able to recognize their own lives in Mira's. Susan G. Cole remembers "riding the subway after [The Women's Room] came out in paperback and noticing five women in one car devouring it." Susan Faludi viewed the novel as capable of "[inspiring] an outward-looking passion and commitment in its readers," which "was no small feat." Gloria Steinem states that The Women's Room "expressed the experience of a huge number of women and let them know that they were not alone and not crazy."

Much of the negative criticism of The Women's Room is based on the lack of dynamic male characters in the book. The failure to have any man in the novel that did not blur together with other male characters allowed negative criticism to home in on the view of an expressed anti-male sentiment, which discredited much of the positive and true portrayal of women in the novel. Ellen Goodman discusses this idea that within The Women's Room, the women are dynamic characters, whereas the male characters lack depth. Christopher Lehmann-Haupt concurs with Goodman and feels that while women may relate to the novel, there is little comfort for men within The Women's Room. Anne Tyler goes a step further than Goodman and Lehmann-Haupt by stating that the entire novel is "very long and very narrow" and very biased.

Cole said "critics thought it was hard on men, but the average woman did not." French's novel was a turning point for feminist fiction. While non-fiction works, such as The Feminine Mystique, were helping to recruit feminists, feminist fiction was still not widely read and was considered reading for only "hardcore" feminists. French's The Women's Room changed that, as shown by its wide reception and New York Times bestseller ranking.

== Other media ==
- The Women's Room (1980), is a three-hour made-for-TV movie that aired on ABC. It starred Lee Remick (as Mira) and Ted Danson (as Norm), and earned three Emmy nominations. The producer, Philip Mandelker, stated that in making the movie they wanted to "create as much controversy as possible, with the purpose of getting men and women to talk to each other." Consequently, it is not surprising that the reviews varied widely. For example, Tom Shales found the movie annoying and a "stinker". In contrast, John J. O'Connor said the movie was a successful adaptation of the book, he thoroughly enjoyed it, and: "No one will be bored."
- The Women's Room (2007), is a BBC Radio dramatization.
