= Between Two Women (1986 film) =

- Genre: Drama
- Written by: Jon Avnet; Larry Grusin; Gillian Martin
- Directed by: Jon Avnet
- Starring: Farrah Fawcett; Colleen Dewhurst; Michael Nouri
- Theme music composer: Charles Gross
- Country of origin: United States
- Original language: English

Production
- Executive producer: Jon Avnet
- Producers: Polly Platt; Carol Schreder
- Cinematography: Gayne Rescher
- Editors: John F. Burnett; Bill Yahraus
- Running time: 120 minutes
- Production company: The Jon Avnet Company

Original release
- Network: ABC
- Release: March 10, 1986

Between Two Women is a 1986 Emmy Award-winning television film starring Farrah Fawcett and Colleen Dewhurst in a story about a relationship between a married woman and her mother-in-law. The film was directed and executive produced by Jon Avnet, and written by Avnet and Larry Grusin.

== Background ==
Avnet had worked with Fawcett before on the 1984 TV movie The Burning Bed. Dewhurst was impressed by Fawcett's performance in the movie and said it was part of why she accepted the role alongside her. Dewhurst was also drawn to the emotional subject matter, which she called unusual for TV movies to portray in depth, and to the opportunity to draw upon her theatrical background in portraying an operatic diva.

ABC aired the movie at 9 p.m. on March 10, 1986.

== Plot ==
Val, an introverted teacher, marries Harry, an artist and the son of a temperamental opera star, Barbara. Barbara disapproves of their relationship, and tries to undermine them. 14 years later, after Val and Harry have separated, Barbara suffers a stroke. Val steps up to care for her, and the two women mend their years-long feud.

== Cast ==
- Farrah Fawcett as Val Petherton
- Colleen Dewhurst as Barbara Petherton
- Michael Nouri as Harry Petherton
- Bridgette Andersen as Kate Petherton
- Danny Corkill as Sandy Petherton
- Steven Hill as Teddy Petherton
- Terry O'Quinn as Dr. Wallace
- Kenneth Danziger as Charles
- Carmen Argenziano as Robert Walker

== Critical reception ==
Between Two Women received largely positive reviews from the press. The New York Times praised the film as "beguiling," writing that it "explores what could be a cliche, or even a tired joke, and turns it into intelligent drama." The Sun-Sentinel called it "one of those few programs on television that should not be missed." The Los Angeles Times, though calling some of the plot points contrived, wrote that it "delves deeper into the nuances of relationships than most TV movies."

Colleen Dewhurst won an Emmy Award for Outstanding Supporting Actress for her performance in the film.
