= The Rothschilds =

The Rothschilds may refer to:

- The Rothschild family, a European family of German Jewish origin that established European banking and finance houses starting in the late 18th century
- The Rothschilds: Portrait of a Dynasty a book by Frederic Morton, telling of the rise of the Rothschild family from humble beginnings in Germany
- The Rothschilds (musical), a 1970 musical with a book by Sherman Yellen, lyrics by Sheldon Harnick and music by Jerry Bock
- The House of Rothschild, a 1934 American film directed by Alfred L. Werker
- The Rothschilds (film), a 1940 German film directed by Erich Waschneck
