= Michael Kidd =

American choreographer (1915–2007)

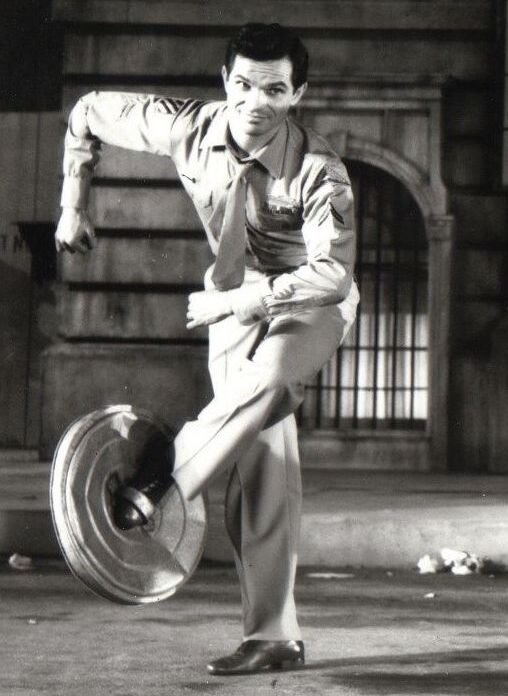
- Kidd in It's Always Fair Weather (1955)
- Born: Milton Greenwald; August 12, 1915; New York City, U.S.
- Died: December 23, 2007 (aged 92); Los Angeles, California, U.S.
- Occupations: Choreographer; dancer; actor
- Years active: 1937–1996
- Spouses: Mary Heater (m. 1940, divorced); Shelah Hackett (m. 1969; death 2007)
- Children: 4

Michael Kidd (born Milton Greenwald; August 12, 1915 – December 23, 2007) was an American film and stage choreographer, dancer and actor, whose career spanned five decades, and who staged some of the leading Broadway and film musicals of the 1940s and 1950s. Kidd, strongly influenced by Charlie Chaplin and Léonide Massine, was an innovator in what came to be known as the "integrated musical", in which dance movements are integral to the plot.

He was probably best known for his athletic dance numbers in Seven Brides for Seven Brothers, a 1954 Metro-Goldwyn-Mayer musical. Film critic Stephanie Zacharek called the barn-raising sequence in Seven Brides "one of the most rousing dance numbers ever put on screen". He was the first choreographer to win five Tony Awards, and was awarded an honorary Oscar in 1996 for advancing dance in film.

== Early life, education, and dance career ==
Kidd was born in New York City on the Lower East Side, the son of Abraham Greenwald, a barber, and his wife Lillian, who were Jewish refugees from Czarist Russia. He moved to Brooklyn with his family and attended New Utrecht High School. He became interested in dance after attending a modern dance performance, and went on to study under Blanche Evan, a dancer and choreographer.

He studied chemical engineering at the City College of New York in 1936 and 1937, but left after being granted a scholarship to the School of American Ballet. He toured the country as a member of the corps de ballet of Lincoln Kirstein’s Ballet Caravan, and performed in roles that included the lead in Billy the Kid, choreographed by Eugene Loring, which featured an orchestral composition by Aaron Copland.

In 1942, while performing with Ballet Caravan, Milton and his fellow dancers were encouraged to adopt an "American" name. His choice of the stage name 'Kidd' as his older brother was a booking agent for the Concord Hotel in the Catskill Mountains, and Milton was always known as "the kid."

In 1941, Kidd became a soloist and assistant to Loring in his Dance Players. He became a soloist for Ballet Theater, later known as the American Ballet Theatre. His performances there included Fancy Free (1944) choreographed by Jerome Robbins and with music by Leonard Bernstein, in which he played one of the three sailors. While at the ABT, he created his own ballet, On Stage! (1945). Although the play and his performance were well received, and the New York Times observed that Kidd was "hailed as one of the great hopes of postwar American ballet," he left Loring's company for Broadway in 1947 and never again worked in ballet.

== Broadway and Hollywood ==
Kidd's first choreography on Broadway was for E.Y. Harburg's Finian's Rainbow, a lyrical musical that explored racial prejudice. Kidd won his first Tony Award for that play. However, his next Broadway musicals were not successful. They were Hold It, a college musical, and the Kurt Weill/Alan Jay Lerner musical Love Life, directed by Elia Kazan, which both had short runs in 1948. Next came Arms and the Girl (1950), directed by Rouben Mamoulian, with Pearl Bailey and Nanette Fabray, also a flop.

Frank Loesser’s Guys and Dolls (1950), his next play, cemented his reputation as a Broadway choreographer. It was based on Damon Runyon short stories, with book by Abe Burrows, and earned Kidd his second Tony Award. The play attracted the attention of movie producers, and he was lured to Hollywood.

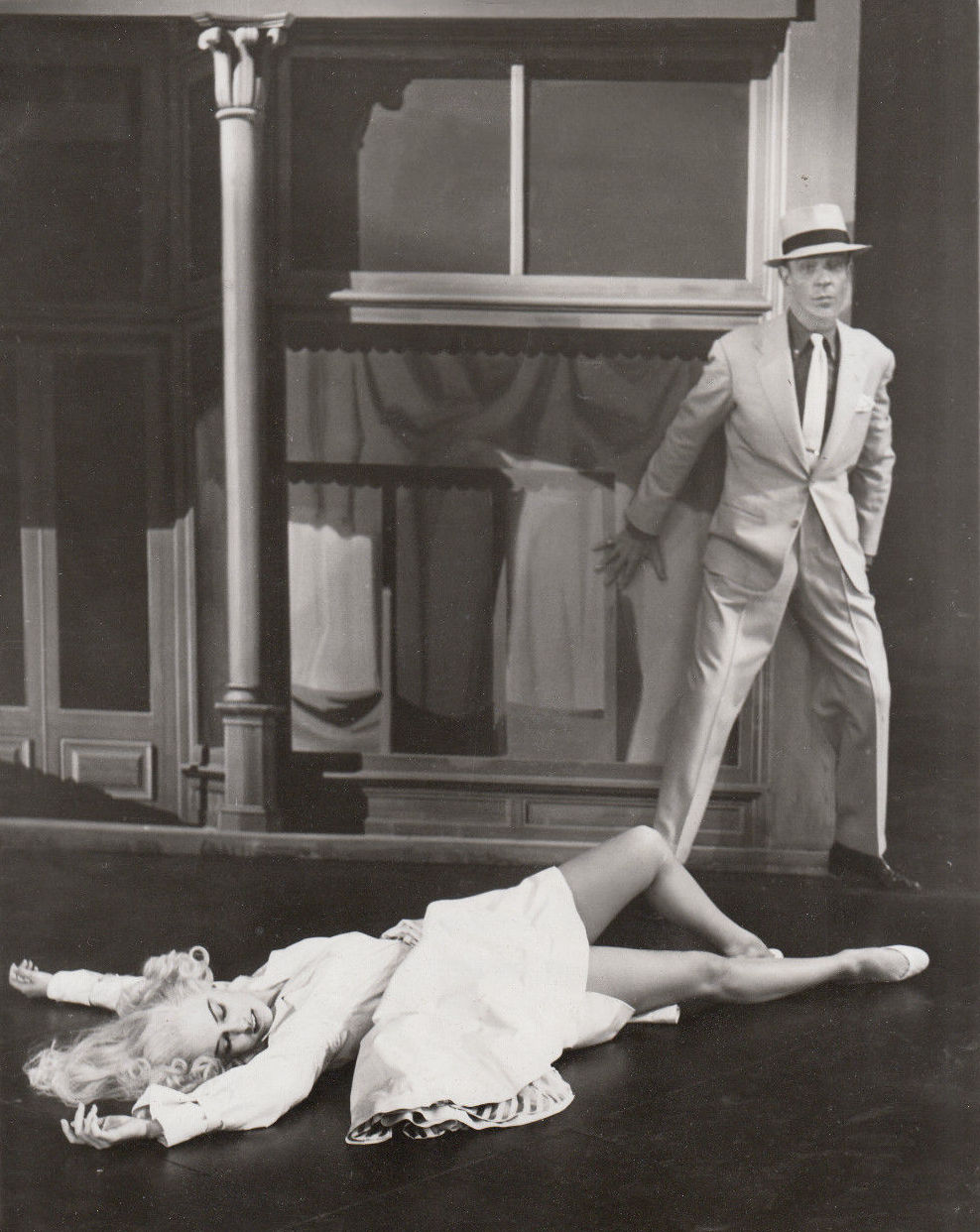
Fred Astaire and Cyd Charisse in the "Girl Hunt Ballet" from The Band Wagon (1953)

His first film was a 1952 film adaptation of Frank Loesser's 1948 Broadway musical Where's Charley?, starring Ray Bolger repeating his Broadway performance in the lead role. His first big film success came the following year with The Band Wagon, starring Fred Astaire and Cyd Charisse.

The Band Wagon, which featured the music and lyrics of Howard Dietz and Arthur Schwartz, included an extensive dance sequence at the end, the "Girl Hunt Ballet" featuring Astaire and Charisse, which was a spoof of hard-boiled Mickey Spillane novels. Kidd was hired to stage the film's dances at Astaire's request because he was nervous about the ballet. Kidd said that he made Astaire comfortable by pretending that he was just making up the steps spontaneously. The film also featured "Shine on Your Shoes", set in a 42nd Street penny arcade and featuring Astaire and LeRoy Daniels, a real-life shoe-shiner, and "Dancing in the Dark" with Charisse, set in Central Park.

Kidd's work for the 1954 film Seven Brides for Seven Brothers brought him acclaim. The film was directed by Stanley Donen, with music by Saul Chaplin and Gene de Paul and lyrics by Johnny Mercer. It was written directly for the screen and based on the short story "The Sobbin' Women", by Stephen Vincent Benét, which was based in turn on the ancient Roman legend of The Rape of the Sabine Women. He initially turned down the assignment, recalling in 1997: "Here are these slobs living off in the woods. They have no schooling, they are uncouth, there's manure on the floor, the cows come in and out—and they're gonna get up and dance? We'd be laughed out of the house."

The entire cast, even extras, consisted of a melange of dancers, acrobats and stuntmen, including the ballet dancers Jacques D'Amboise of the New York City Ballet and Marc Platt, formerly of the Ballet Russe de Monte Carlo. Except for Howard Keel and Jane Powell, the roles of the brothers and their brides were all played by professional dancers at Kidd's insistence. Mercer said that the musical numbers were written at Kidd's behest, as an example "of how a songwriter sometimes has to take his cue from his collaborators". For example, Kidd explained to Mercer and dePaul his conception of the "Lonesome Polecat" number, the lament of the brothers for the women, and the two worked out the music and lyrics.

By the mid-1950s, Hollywood's output of movie musicals had begun to wane, and he worked on only two more during the rest of the decade. He made his movie acting debut in It's Always Fair Weather (1955), directed by Gene Kelly and Donen, in which Kelly, Kidd and Dan Dailey played three ex-GIs meeting 10 years after the war, only to discover they had little in common. The film featured an exuberant number in which the three dance with garbage can lids fastened to their feet. The downbeat film was a critical success but was not heavily promoted by the studio, and failed at the box office. The film was originally designed to be a sequel to the 1949 film On the Town, but Frank Sinatra and Jules Munshin were unavailable, and the film lacked chemistry among the three actors. The production was marked by constant strife between Donen and Kelly, with much of it stemming from Donen's striving unsuccessfully to include "Jack and the Space Giants", a 10-minute dance solo by Kidd. Kelly rejected this, which Kidd took as a personal insult, and Donen went further, ending his collaboration with Kelly for the rest of their lives. The "Jack" number appears as a bonus feature on a DVD of the film, and one commentator suggests that Kelly's judgment was not wrong as the number was listless and did not advance the plot.

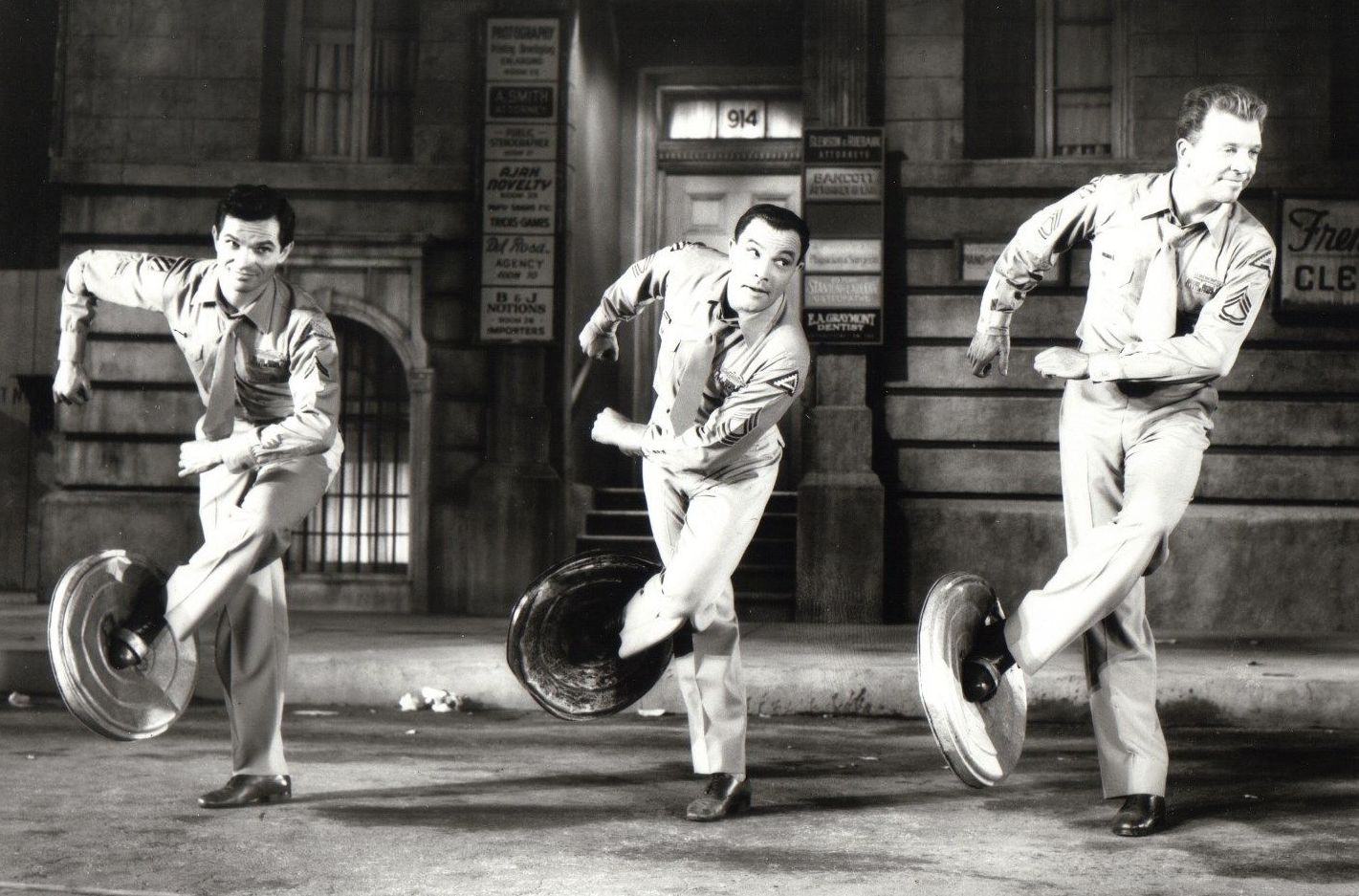
Kidd's (left) screen acting debut, dancing with Gene Kelly and Dan Dailey in It's Always Fair Weather (1955)

Kidd was both director and choreographer for the musical comedy film Merry Andrew (1958), starring Danny Kaye. By then, the era of movie musicals was pretty much over, and Kidd turned his attention to Broadway, where he had continued to work while choreographing movies. At the same time that he was choreographing The Band Wagon, he was staging dances for Cole Porter’s Broadway musical Can-Can. In this show, he created dance numbers for Gwen Verdon that helped make her a Broadway sensation.

His other Broadway shows during the 1950s included Li'l Abner in 1956, which he directed as well as choreographed. He won another Tony Award for his choreography, which was adapted for the film version in 1959. After Merry Andrew, however, he made no other films until Star!, with Julie Andrews, in 1968. Neither film was successful.

On Broadway, he directed and choreographed Destry Rides Again (1959), with Andy Griffith, Wildcat (1960), which starred Lucille Ball, Subways Are for Sleeping (1961), a musical comedy about homelessness, and Ben Franklin in Paris (1964), starring Robert Preston. He also choreographed the famous Broadway flop Breakfast at Tiffany's (1966), a musical version of the Truman Capote novella with Mary Tyler Moore and Richard Chamberlain that never officially opened.

He choreographed the 1969 film adaptation of the hit Broadway play Hello, Dolly! The film was beset by tension on the unhappy set, with Barbra Streisand clashing with her costar Walter Matthau and director Gene Kelly; Kidd also had conflicts with costume designer Irene Sharaff and Kelly to the point that he and Kelly were no longer on speaking terms. The film was not a success as a musical, with Kelly and Kidd making little use of the widescreen format of the film. Critic Tom Santopietro described their approach as "shoveling more and more bodies on screen with no apparent purpose".

He went on to direct and choreograph the 1970 Broadway musical The Rothschilds, starring Hal Linden, and directed The Goodbye Girl, with Bernadette Peters and Martin Short, a 1993 adaptation of the 1977 Neil Simon film that was his final Broadway play. Although he was nominated for a Tony Award for best director, reviews were mixed. In The New York Times, Frank Rich wrote that "Kidd, who did much to define slam-bang Broadway and Hollywood musical-comedy style in the 1950s, directs The Goodbye Girl in a mechanical reduction of that style: Everything is fast, furious, loud and downstage center. Not that any director could overcome this musical's physical production."

Kidd appeared in supporting roles as a character actor in the 1970s and 1980s, beginning with his performance as the faded, cynical choreographer for a cheesy beauty pageant in the satirical 1975 film Smile. Film critic Roger Ebert called Kidd's portrayal of the pageant choreographer a "finely etched semiautobiographical performance". He acted in and staged the musical sequences in the 1978 film Movie Movie, which was directed by Stanley Donen, with whom he'd worked in Seven Brides for Seven Brothers and It's Always Fair Weather. Kidd directed an episode of the TV comedy Laverne & Shirley (1976) as well as scenes for Janet Jackson in two music videos: "When I Think of You" (1986) and "Alright" (1990). He conceived and choreographed the television special Baryshnikov in Hollywood, starring Mikhail Baryshnikov in 1982, for which he was nominated for an Emmy Award.

== Personal life ==
Kidd died of cancer at the age 92 at his home in Los Angeles, California. His marriage to the dancer Mary Heater in 1940 ended in divorce. At his death, he was survived by his wife Shelah Hackett, whom he married in 1969, two daughters from his first marriage, and a son and daughter from his second.

Kidd was the uncle of filmmaker and political activist Robert Greenwald. His older brother was Harold Greenwald, a prominent psychotherapist and best-selling author of the 1958 book The Call Girl, who was an expert in the study of prostitution.

== Choreographic style ==
Kidd was unusually well-respected, and his judgment was granted deference by the leading dancers of his era. British critic and biographer Michael Freedland said at the time of his death that "when Gene Kelly danced through the street with a dustbin lid tied to his feet in the 1955 film It's Always Fair Weather, the man who usually planned his own routines did it to Kidd's order".

His realistic approach, designing dances that were inspired by the way ordinary people behaved, led one critic to observe that "Kidd is, in a way, the originator of the fantasy that if only your life shaped up and offered you the right moments, you too would be able to dance like a Hollywood star".

Kidd believed that dance needed to derive from life, saying that his "dancing is based on naturalistic movement that is abstracted and enlarged", and that "all my movements relate to some kind of real activity". He always wanted dance to serve the story, and when beginning a new work he would write a scenario, explaining how the plot drove the characters to dance. His biggest influences were Charlie Chaplin, "because he expressed through movement the aspirations of the little man", and the dancer and choreographer Léonide Massine, "because he expressed more than just balletic ability—he was always a character on stage, an exaggerated character, which I do all the time: an exaggeration of ordinary movement".

His distinct style was evident in his early days in ballet. Describing a rare film clip of his performance in On Stage, dance critic Anna Kisselgoff recounted that Kidd in one scene played a handyman consoling ballerina Janet Reed, playing a shy young woman at a ballet audition. "Classical technique was used to expressive purpose as the wonderful Miss Reed grew visibly exuberant and confident as Mr. Kidd, broom in hand, entertained her with his virtuosic performance."

He once said that "in choreography, ordinary movements from real life are taken and extended, so they become dance movements, yet the relation to reality must always be there. It's important for me to know who the characters are and what their function is in the script. I must be able to illustrate either their activities, their emotions, or their changes in mood by the way they dance, all the while keeping the dance movements footed in reality and yet making the movements sort of odd and eccentric." This philosophy was reflected in the early scene from The Band Wagon, when Fred Astaire walks down a railroad platform singing "By Myself." His walk was not quite a dance, and epitomized Kidd's style.

In a 2012 appreciation of his work, Dance Teacher stated that "Kidd drew from the vocabularies of ballet, modern, social dance and acrobatics. But above all, his choreography stemmed from realistic movements and gestures. Following in the tradition of Agnes de Mille and Jerome Robbins, who developed the integrated musical, Kidd created dances that helped to carry the plot and flesh out the characters. He put the story first, communicating it through dance." Kidd once said that "every move, every turn should mean something. Dancing should be completely understandable." In Seven Brides for Seven Brothers he employed leading ballet dancers, but insisted that his dancers avoid ballet dance moves, and instead focus on "work movements like ax wielding".

In choreographing Seven Brides, Kidd once said that he "had to find a way to have these backwoods men dance without looking ridiculous. I had to base it all around activities you would accept from such people—it couldn't look like ballet. And it could only have been done by superbly trained dancers." Yet he was able to integrate into the cast Russ Tamblyn, a non-dancer MGM contract player who was assigned to the film, by using his talents as a gymnast and tumbler in the dance numbers.

Kidd's personal favorite of the films he choreographed, however, was not Seven Brides or Band Wagon but Guys and Dolls, which he felt was "the best, most inventive and best integrated musical I've ever seen".

Although he came from the world of classic ballet, a Los Angeles Times critic noted at his death that he had "a healthy disdain for its pretensions". He staged a comedic ballet sequence for the 1954 Danny Kaye film Knock on Wood, in which Kaye is chased into a theater and hides on stage during a performance by a Russian ballet company. The sequence allowed Kidd to lampoon the stylistic excesses he'd observed as a dancer at the American Ballet Theatre.

As in his choreography for both the Broadway and 1955 film adaptation of Guys and Dolls, and in the "Girl Hunt Ballet", Kidd's choreography in Seven Brides exuded masculinity. One history of the musical theater observes that "Kidd forged dances, and shows, in which men were men, leaping high, stout hearted, and passionate about their dolls". He choreographed "for the little guy, the working guy, the guy defined by his job and the movement that job entailed".

Although Kidd drove his dancers hard, partly because he himself was capable of doing all the dance steps that he required of them, his personal style was gentle. Nanette Fabray, who performed in Love Life, could only make dancing turns to the left side because of a hearing problem. Rather than insisting she turn to the right, as many choreographers would do, Kidd "found that fascinating, and he made all the other dancers turn to the left". Julie Andrews recalled that the "Burlington Bertie From Bow" number in Star! was physically demanding, and she balked when Kidd asked her for a retake, saying she had a bad back. Andrews recalled that "he looked crestfallen. Then he said 'I wasn't trying to be mean. I just knew that when you saw it on film, you wouldn't be pleased.' I always thought that was a nice way to say 'Once more.'"

== Awards ==
Kidd was the first choreographer to win five Tony Awards, and received nine Tony nominations. He was awarded an Academy Honorary Award in 1997 "in recognition of his services to the art of dance in the art of the screen".

He was inducted into the American Theatre Hall of Fame in 1981.

== Film credits ==
- Where's Charley? (1952) – choreographer
- The Band Wagon (1953) – co-choreographer with Fred Astaire
- Knock on Wood (1954) – choreographer
- Seven Brides for Seven Brothers (1954) – choreographer
- Guys and Dolls (1955) – choreographer
- It's Always Fair Weather (1955) – actor
- Merry Andrew (1958) – director and choreographer
- Li'l Abner (1959) – original choreography
- Star! (1968) – choreographer
- Hello, Dolly! (1969) – choreographer
- Smile (1975) – actor
- Actor (1978) (TV movie) – actor
- Movie Movie (1978) – actor, musical staging
- For the Love of It (TV Movie) (1980) – actor
- Skin Deep (1989) – actor

== Broadway credits ==
- Filling Station (1939) – ballet – dancer in the role of "The Gangster"
- Billy the Kid (1939) – ballet to the music of Aaron Copland – dancer
- Pocahontas (1939) – ballet to the music of Elliott Carter – dancer cast as an "Indian Man"
- Billy the Kid (1942 revival) – director and dancer
- Interplay (1945) – ballet to the music of Morton Gould and choreography of Jerome Robbins – dancer
- Fancy Free (1946) – ballet, with music of Leonard Bernstein and choreography of Jerome Robbins – dancer cast as a "Sailor"
- Finian's Rainbow (1947) – musical – choreographer – Tony Award for Best Choreography
- Hold It! (1948) – musical – choreographer
- Love Life (1948) – musical – choreographer
- Arms and the Girl (1950) – musical – choreographer
- Guys and Dolls (1950) – musical – choreographer – Tony Award for Best Choreography
- Can-Can (1953) – musical – choreographer – Tony Award for Best Choreography
- Li'l Abner (1956) – musical – director, choreographer, and co-producer – Tony Award for Best Choreography
- Destry Rides Again (1959) – musical – director and choreographer – Tony Award for Best Choreography and nominated for Best Direction of a Musical
- Wildcat (1960) – musical – director, choreographer, and co-producer
- Subways Are For Sleeping (1961) – musical – director and choreographer – Tony Award Nomination for Best Choreography
- Here's Love (1963) – musical – choreographer
- Ben Franklin in Paris (1964) – musical – director and choreographer
- Skyscraper (1965) – musical – choreographer – Tony Award Nomination for Best Choreography
- Breakfast at Tiffany's (1966 – never officially opened) – musical – choreographer
- The Rothschilds (1970) – musical – director and choreographer – Tony Award Nominations for Best Direction of a Musical and Best Choreography
- Cyrano (1973) – musical – director and choreographer
- The Music Man (1980 revival) – musical – director and choreographer
- The Goodbye Girl (1993) – musical – director – Tony Award Nomination for Best Direction of a Musical
