= The Last Run =

1971 film by Richard Fleischer

- Theatrical release poster
- Directed by: Richard Fleischer
- Written by: Alan Sharp
- Produced by: Carter DeHaven
- Starring: George C. Scott; Tony Musante; Trish Van Devere
- Cinematography: Sven Nykvist
- Edited by: Russell Lloyd
- Music by: Jerry Goldsmith
- Production company: Metro-Goldwyn-Mayer
- Distributed by: Metro-Goldwyn-Mayer
- Release date: July 7, 1971
- Running time: 95 minutes
- Country: United States
- Language: English
- Budget: over $2 million

The Last Run is a 1971 American action thriller film directed by Richard Fleischer, written by Alan Sharp, and starring George C. Scott, Tony Musante, and Trish Van Devere. The film follows a former mob getaway driver (Scott) living in Portugal, who is hired to transport a fugitive couple (Musante and Van Devere).

Intended by Scott as a self-conscious homage to the films of Humphrey Bogart, The Last Run began production in January 1971 with John Huston as director. Due to conflicts between director and star, Huston left the project after a month and was replaced by Fleischer. Shooting took place on-location in Portugal and Spain.

The film was released by Metro-Goldwyn-Mayer on July 7, 1971. It received generally negative reviews and was a financial disappointment.

== Plot ==
Harry Garmes is an aging American career criminal who was once a driver for the Chicago Outfit. He is living in self-imposed exile in Albufeira, a fishing village in southern Portugal, where he owns a fishing boat and seeks occasional companionship from Monique, a local prostitute, as his wife has left him after the untimely death of their son.

Unexpectedly, Harry receives a job, his first in nine years, to drive escaped killer Paul Rickard and his girlfriend Claudie Scherrer across Portugal and Spain into France. Rickard was imprisoned in Spain for an unrelated crime, but he originally had been hired to assassinate the French President Charles de Gaulle by the OAS, which failed; it appears that the OAS is attempting another hit, and has arranged his escape and transport. Without knowing this, Harry accepts the job as a chance to prove to himself that he can still make the grade, despite premonitions that it will end badly for him as he gives Monique money to hold, which she may keep if he doesn't come back.

In the course of the trip, made in a BMW 503 modified with a hidden smuggling compartment and supercharger, Harry and his passengers are pursued by both the Spanish police and the French Security Service, who in fact arranged the escape to eliminate Rickard. Upon returning to Portugal, and apparently having been betrayed by Monique, Harry gets shot on the beach in Albufeira, moments away from escaping on his boat with Rickard and Scherrer.

== Cast ==
- George C. Scott as Harry Garmes
- Tony Musante as Paul Rickard
- Trish Van Devere as Claudie Scherrer
- Colleen Dewhurst as Monique
- Aldo Sambrell as Miguel
  - Robert Rietti as Miguel's voice (uncredited)
- Antonio Tarruella as Motorcycle Cop
- Robert Coleby as Hitchhiker
- Pat Zurica and Rocky Taylor as Hitmen

== Production ==
The film was based on an original script by Alan Sharp who called it "an attempt to use the melodramatic crime chase to deal with whatever the hero's preoccupations might be."

In July 1970, MGM-British announced they would be making a production and distribution deal with EMI creating a new company, MGM-EMI, and would produce four films: The Go-Between, The Boyfriend, Get Carter and The Last Run. By that stage the film was going to be directed by John Boorman. Boorman eventually left the project because he was unhappy with the script.

George C. Scott agreed to play the lead role Harry Garmes. He was at the height of his career due to the success of Patton and did The Last Run because "for the longest time I've been looking for a Bogart-like meaty part. I haven't found it til now." Scott called the movie "an old fashioned adventure picture. It's kind of a Bogart part - the lonely, separated man trying to make a comeback. It's the sort of thing that people can enjoy."

=== Under John Huston ===
In November 1970, MGM head of production Herbert F. Solow announced the film would be made as part of a ten picture slate from the studio over the next six months - the other films were The Wild Rovers, Fortune and Men's Eyes, Shaft, Sextette (ultimately not made for some years), Travels with My Aunt, The Gang That Couldn't Shoot Straight, Bullet Proof and The Gazebo. By now the director of The Last Run was John Huston. He and Scott previously worked together on The List of Adrian Messenger and The Bible: In the Beginning....

Huston later said "I didn't like the script that was given to me" but he still agreed to make it. "I should never have got into it." His cinematographer was Sven Nykvist, who regularly collaborated with Ingmar Bergman and was making his first American movie. Nykvist later recalled he felt "very insecure" during the shoot "because, instead of the 18 technicians I was used to working with, I had about 100. I saw that everyone was sitting around most of the time. Someone told me that I was the man who should make them work, but I couldn't do that because I was so shy. So I talked to myself that evening and I said: "You have to remember what Ingmar said when we started our first picture-the only thing that's important is what shows on the screen. "

Key roles were given to Tony Musante and Tina Aumont as the fugitive couple. Italian actor Giuliano Gemma was also set to appear. Filming began in Portugal in January 3, 1971. Scott and Huston had fights on the set, in part because Huston and his son Tony Huston were rewriting the script constantly. Matters were complicated by Scott's drinking. His wife Colleen Dewhurst flew out to the location with his two children Alexander and Campbell Scott; Dewhurst wound up playing heart-of-gold-hooker Monique who has a small but important scene with Harry (Scott) in the first act.

Huston said he thought he could change the script "and make it something acceptable. The possibilities of the story appealed to me. What was done in black and white didn't appeal to me very much, but I saw an opportunity to do something with it, changes which would be acceptable and interesting." Alan Sharp later said he rewrote the script six times. "I'm not one of those guys who feels 'It's my masterpiece, no one must touch it'," he said. "If they want to make changes let them make changes. In the final analysis, it's got to be their picture anyway. What gets me is when they come to me and say 'I don't know what it is I want but that isn't it. Give me something else'." Sharp said Huston, Huston's assistant Gladys Hill, and son Tony "played around" with the script "until they've got it all screwed up - no characterization, no motivation, no nothing" and said Scott was frustrated because He "wanted to do the original script." Huston said "Scott wanted to do something nostalgic which would bring to mind the old Bogart films... I didn't agree. It just proved that I should never have got into it in the first place."

By February, Huston had walked off the production. Aumont also quit the film. "She couldn't act," claimed Sharp who said Huston rewrote the script in part to create a new character for her "so she could get through it somehow without having to act." "It was a very simple story of an artistic disagreement," said Scott. "John saw it one way. Carter and I another. I love Huston, I want to work with him again. He is a giant in our industry."

=== Under Richard Fleischer ===
Production was shut down for a week. MGM head of European operations Robert Littman flew out to the set. Jim Aubrey, head of MGM, wanted to abandon filming but Littman persuaded him to continue. Littman called Richard Fleischer, who had just finished directing Mia Farrow in See No Evil. Fleischer turned down the job, disliking the script. He was persuaded to visit the unit, where he met with the producer, star and writer. He got Sharp to tell him the story they were making, and said that was not the story in the script. Fleischer read the original draft and felt "all the important parts" had been cut out.

Finding a replacement for Aumont was more difficult. Scott wanted Bonnie Bedelia who had just finished a movie in Spain but she turned down the part. Eventually the role went to Trish Van Devere, an American actress who had just made her film debut in Where's Poppa?. Scott and Van Devere fell in love during the production once Dewhurst left the unit. Dewhurst and Scott divorced after the production concluded, and the actor married Van Devere. "What happened in the film, happened in life," said Fleischer. "That's nature imitating art."

The film finished with a cost of a little over $2 million, being only one week and $30,000 over the original schedule. "I think it's a miracle it got made," said Fleischer. "I'm the miracle."

== Release ==
=== Home media ===
In 2011, The Last Run was released on DVD as a Warner Brothers Archive release.

== Reception ==
=== Box office ===
The film was not a commercial success.

=== Critical response ===
The Last Run was poorly received by critics, and most of them lamented the replacement of Huston with Fleischer. Roger Ebert, writing for the Chicago Sun-Times, commented that "with Huston directing Alan Sharp's interesting screenplay, the movie would still have had the good stuff, I think, and would have avoided the embarrassing collapses of tone that wreck this version."

Roger Greenspun, reviewing the film for The New York Times, stated that Fleischer "a veteran of more than 20 years in the business...seems not yet to have mastered the reaction shot; and his automobile chase sequences, for all the billowing dust and squealing tires, seem to move at 30 miles an hour."

Toni Mastroianni, reviewing the film for the Cleveland Press, faulted Scott’s performance as the main stumbling block: "The problem with Scott at the moment is to find a movie as big as he is. The role is right for him and maybe he should play a real Hemingway part instead of an imitation one."

The Los Angeles Times called it "a satisfying film".

John Huston said of the finished film, that it "had nothing to recommend it."

On Rotten Tomatoes, the film has an aggregated score of 57% based on 4 positive and 3 negative reviews.

== See also ==
- The Transporter (2002)
- List of American films of 1971

== Notes ==
- Pratley, Gerald (1976). The cinema of John Huston. A. S. Barnes.
