= Stalk the Wild Child =

- Genre: Drama
- Written by: Peter Packer
- Directed by: William Hale
- Starring: David Janssen; Trish Van Devere; Ben Bottoms
- Music by: John Rubinstein
- Country of origin: United States
- Original language: English

Production
- Executive producer: Charles W. Fries
- Producers: Stanley Bass; Paul Wendkos
- Production locations: Universal Studios - 100 Universal City Plaza, Universal City, California
- Cinematography: Harry J. May
- Editor: David Newhouse
- Running time: 90 minutes
- Production company: Charles Fries Productions

Original release
- Network: NBC
- Release: November 3, 1976

Stalk the Wild Child is a fact-based 1976 American television film directed by William Hale and written by Lost In Space veteran Peter Packer. It starred David Janssen, along with real-life brothers Ben and Joseph Bottoms.

== Plot ==
A psychologist attempts to civilize a child found in the forest.

== Cast ==
- David Janssen as Dr. James Hazard
- Trish Van Devere as Maggie
- Ben Bottoms as Young Cal
- Joseph Bottoms as Adult Cal
- Allan Arbus as Gault
- Jamie-Smith Jackson as Andrea
- Rhea Perlman as Jean
- Fran Ryan as Ellen Mott
- Barry Van Dyke as Volleyball Player
