= Sherman Yellen =

American dramatist (born 1932)

- Born: February 25, 1932 (age 94); New York City, U.S.
- Education: Bard College (BA); Columbia University (MA)
- Notable work: The Rothschilds; Oh! Calcutta! An Early Frost
- Spouse: Joan Fuhr
- Children: 2

Sherman Yellen (born February 25, 1932) is an American playwright, screenwriter, and political commentator.

== Early life and education ==
Sherman Yellen was born in 1932 to Nathan and Lillian Yellen. He attended the High School of Music & Art and graduated from Bard College in 1953.

At Bard, Yellen studied creative writing with Texas novelist William Humphrey, was named John Bard Scholar in his sophomore year and received the Wilton E. Lockwood Award for Literature upon graduation. In later years he received the Charles Flint Kellogg Award in Arts and Letters. He attended graduate school at Columbia University where he studied 18th century English Literature.

== Career ==
Yellen's first play was New Gods For Lovers, which was produced at the HB Playhouse in New York. This play, entered in a playwriting competition, won the Hallmark Award, and he began to write television dramas for the Hallmark Hall of Fame. Yellen also wrote Beauty and the Beast, and An Early Frost, television films for NBC.

His American Civil War television drama, Day Before Battle, was written in collaboration with his friend, playwright Peter Stone, and appeared on Studio One. Yellen also wrote adaptations of Great Expectations, Dr.Jekyl and Mr. Hyde, Phantom of the Opera. Yellen also wrote for the PBS series The Adams Chronicles.

Yellen's work in Broadway theatre includes his Tony Award-nominated libretto for the musical The Rothschilds, with music by Jerry Bock and Sheldon Harnick; Rex, a musical about the life and loves of Henry VIII with music by Richard Rodgers; and Strangers, a biographical drama about Sinclair Lewis. His satirical sketch, Delicious Indignities, appeared in the erotic revue Oh! Calcutta!, which featured sketches from Sam Shepard, John Lennon, Samuel Beckett, and others.

He later incorporated the music of popular songwriter Jimmy McHugh into a new musical about young journalists in Paris in 1927, Lucky in the Rain, which had a successful run at the Goodspeed Opera. His collaboration with composer Wally Harper on Say Yes created a light hearted-musical comedy about the 1939 New York World's Fair, produced in 2000 for the Berkshire Theatre Festival. In Josephine Tonight!, a musical biography of the early life of Josephine Baker produced by Theatre Building Chicago, Yellen was librettist and lyricist to composer Harper. "Josephine Tonight!" was recently revived as "Blackbird" and was staged in Washington, D.C., and Florida.

Yellen's most recent straight play, December Fools, a comedy-drama about a composer's widow and her daughter, was produced by Abingdon Theatre Company in 2006. The same year, Josephine Tonight was produced by Theatre Building Chicago.

Yellen has written numerous op-ed columns for HuffPost, focusing on culture and American politics from a left-wing perspective.

== Personal life ==
As an undergraduate at Bard College, Yellen met Joan Fuhr. The couple wed after their graduation and have two sons, Nicholas and Christopher. Yellen lives on the Upper East Side of Manhattan.

== Film and television credits ==
- Not a Penny More, Not a Penny Less (TV movie) – Writer (teleplay) 1990
- I'll Take Manhattan (TV mini-series) – Writer (writer) 1987
- An Early Frost (TV movie) – Writer (story) 1985
- The Phantom of the Opera (1983 TV movie) – Writer (writer) 1983
- The Last Giraffe (TV movie) – Writer (writer) 1979
- Hallmark Hall of Fame (TV series) – Writer (1 episode, 1976): "Beauty and the Beast"
- The Adams Chronicles (PBS Series) – Writer 1976
- Great Expectations (TV movie) – Writer (writer) 1974
- Dr. Jekyll and Mr. Hyde (TV movie) – Writer (writer) 1973
- Oh! Calcutta! – Writer (contributions) 1972
- The Iron Horse (TV series) – Writer (1 episode, 1967): "Welcome for the General"
- 12 O'Clock High (TV series) – Writer (1 episode, 1965): "Target 802"
- Studio One in Hollywood (TV series) – Writer (1 episode, 1956): "A Day Before Battle"

== Theatre credits ==
- Josephine Tonight (revised five character version) Metro Stage, Written by Sherman Yellen – 2012
- December Fools (Original, play) Written by Sherman Yellen – 2006
- Josephine Tonight! (Original TBC Chicago studio production of musical) Book and Lyrics by Sherman Yellen – 2006
- This Fair World (Original, Musical) Book by Sherman Yellen
- Say Yes! aka This Fair World (Original, Musical) Book by Sherman Yellen – 2000
- Lucky in the Rain (Original, Musical) Book by Sherman Yellen – 1997
- Strangers (Original, Play) Written by Sherman Yellen – 1979
- Oh! Calcutta! (Revival, Musical, Revue) - Sketch contribution ("Delicious Indignities") by Sherman Yellen – 1976–1989
- Rex (Original, Musical) – Book by Sherman Yellen – 1976; revised version Toronto Civic Light Opera Company 2010
- The Rothschilds (Original, Musical) – Book by Sherman Yellen – 1970–1972

== Awards ==
- Hallmark Award – New Gods for Lovers
- Christopher Award – Hallmark Hall of Fame ("Beauty and the Beast" episode)
- Emmy Award – The Adams Chronicles
- Emmy Award – An Early Frost

== See also ==
- An Early Frost
- Huffington Post
- The Environmentalist
- William Humphrey
