= Trish Van Devere =

American actress

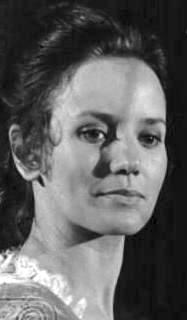
- Van Devere in Beauty and the Beast (1976)
- Born: Patricia Louise Dressel; March 9, 1941 (age 85); Tenafly, New Jersey, U.S.
- Education: Ohio Wesleyan University
- Occupation: Actress
- Years active: 1951–1994
- Spouses: Grant Van Devere (m. 1963; div. 1964); George C. Scott (m. 1972; died 1999)

Trish Van Devere (born Patricia Louise Dressel; March 9, 1941) (Note: While numerous sources list Van Devere's birthday as March 9, they vary regarding her birth year, with some citing 1943 or 1945; however, the California Marriage Index lists her age as 31, and birth year as 1941 when she married George C. Scott in 1972.) is a retired American actress. She was nominated for a Golden Globe Award for the film One Is a Lonely Number (1972), and won a Genie Award for the film The Changeling (1980). She is the widow of actor George C. Scott, with whom she appeared in multiple films.

== Early life ==
Van Devere was born March 9, 1941, as Patricia Louise Dressel in Tenafly, New Jersey. Her father owned a Pontiac dealership and real estate business, which was inherited by her mother after her father's death when Van Devere was nine years old. After attending Tenafly High School, she graduated in 1958 from Northern Valley High School before attending Ohio Wesleyan University, where she met and married a fellow student, Grant Van Devere. The marriage lasted only eight months, but she retained Van Devere as her stage name.

== Career ==
In 1966, Van Devere moved to New York City and began pursuing a career in acting, studying at the Actors Studio. She co-founded the Free Southern Theater with Scott Cunningham, an African American fellow actor, staging plays in fields and at churches in the Southern United States for indigent African Americans who had never seen live theater before. Two years later, Van Devere and Cunningham founded an offshoot theater company, the Poor People's Theater in New York City, headquartered in the basement of Manhattan's Riverside Church, which held similar theatrical productions in churches, schools, and streets.

Van Devere had her breakthrough portraying the original Meredith Lord in the soap opera One Life to Live in 1968 — the income from which she largely used to help maintain the Poor People's Theater Company. In 1970, she co-starred with George Segal and Ruth Gordon in the comedy Where's Poppa? She subsequently garnered significant notice for her lead role in the film One Is a Lonely Number (1972), for which she was nominated for a Golden Globe award.

Van Devere married actor George C. Scott in September 1972 in Santa Monica, California, after they appeared together in the film The Last Run (1971). The couple subsequently appeared in a number of films together, including The Day of the Dolphin, and The Savage Is Loose (both 1973, the latter film directed by Scott); the television film Beauty and the Beast (1976), Movie Movie (1978), and the supernatural horror film The Changeling (1980). Also in 1980, Van Devere had a lead role in the horror film The Hearse.

Van Devere performed frequently in both television and film until 1994, and appeared in television programs such as Love Story, The Fall Guy, Hardcastle and McCormick, Highway to Heaven and The Love Boat. She starred alongside Peter Falk in a 1978 episode of the detective series Columbo entitled Make Me a Perfect Murder, in which she portrayed a TV producer who murders her ex-lover. She appeared in the Charles Bronson film Messenger of Death. She remained married to Scott until his death in 1999.

== Filmography ==
=== Film ===
Year	Film	Role	Notes
1970	The Landlord	Sally	(as Patricia Van Devere)
1970	Where's Poppa?	Louise Callan	aka Going Ape
1971	The Last Run	Claudie Scherrer	
1972	One Is a Lonely Number	Aimee Brower	
1973	Harry in Your Pocket	Sandy Coletto	
1973	The Day of the Dolphin	Maggie Terrell	
1974	The Savage Is Loose	Maida	
1978	Movie Movie	Betsy McGuire/Isobel Stuart	
1979	The Changeling	Claire Norman	
1979	The Hearse	Jane Hardy	
1986	Uphill All the Way	The Widow Quinn	
1986	Hollywood Vice Squad	Pauline Stanton	aka The Boulevard
1988	Messenger of Death	Jastra Watson	

=== Television ===
Year	Title	Role(s)	Notes
1965	Search for Tomorrow	Patti Barron Tate Whiting McCleary, R. N. #5	Series regular
1968	One Life to Live	Meredith Lord	Series regular
1973	Love Story	Miriam Fannon	Episode: "The Soft, Kind Brush"
1976	Stalk the Wild Child	Maggie	TV movie
1976	Beauty and the Beast	Belle Beaumont	TV movie
1977	Sharon: Portrait of a Mistress	Sharon Blake	TV movie
1978	Columbo	Kay Freestone	Episode: "Make Me a Perfect Murder"
1979	Mayflower: The Pilgrims' Adventure	Rose Standish	TV movie
1980	All God's Children	Natalie Kent	TV movie
1983	The Fall Guy	Irene Atkins	Episode: "One Hundred Miles a Gallon"
1984	Vengeance Is Mine	Donna	TV movie
1984	Hardcastle and McCormick	Deidre 'D.D.' Drylinger	Episode: "D-Day"
1985	Highway to Heaven	Mrs. Elaine Parks	Episode: "The Brightest Star"
1986	The Love Boat	Amanda Dailey	Episode: "My Stepmother, Myself/Almost Roommates/Cornerback Sneak"
1993	Curacao	Rose	TV movie

== Awards and nominations ==
Year	Award	Category	Title of work	Result
1971	Laurel Award	Star of Tomorrow, Female	Where's Poppa?	7th place
1973	Golden Globe	Best Actress in a Motion Picture - Drama	One is a Lonely Number	Nominated
1980	Genie Award	Best Performance by a Foreign Actress	The Changeling	Won
