= The Hearse =

- Theatrical release poster
- Directed by: George Bowers
- Written by: William Bleich
- Produced by: Mark Tenser
- Starring: Trish Van Devere; Joseph Cotten; David Gautreaux; Donald Hotton
- Cinematography: Mori Kawa
- Edited by: George Berndt
- Music by: Webster Lewis
- Production company: Marimark Productions
- Distributed by: Crown International Pictures
- Release date: March 21, 1980 (Kansas City, Missouri)
- Running time: 100 minutes
- Country: United States
- Language: English
- Box office: $2.8 million

The Hearse is a 1980 American supernatural horror film directed by George Bowers and starring Trish Van Devere and Joseph Cotten. It follows a schoolteacher from San Francisco who relocates to a small town in northern California to spend the summer in a house she inherited from her deceased aunt, only to uncover her aunt's past as a devil worshipper, which seems to trigger a series of supernatural occurrences. This is the first credited role for Christopher McDonald.

== Plot ==
Jane Hardy, a schoolteacher in San Francisco, suffers a nervous breakdown following a divorce and the simultaneous death of her mother. To emotionally recover, she decides to spend the summer in the rural town of Blackford in a home left to her by her late aunt, Rebecca. Upon arriving, she is given keys to the house by Walter Pritchard, a local attorney who claims Jane's mother promised to bestow him the property. Shortly after moving in, Jane begins experiencing supernatural occurrences, including witnessing apparitions of Rebecca, and a ghostly black hearse driven by a mysterious man that pulls into the driveway before vanishing. Furthermore, she is unsettled by the locals' passive-aggressive reactions to her presence in the town, including from Pritchard, who is deliberately unhurried to place the house in her name.

Jane hires Paul, the local hardware store owner's son, to help her repair the home. She finds a trunk in the attic full of her aunt's mementos, including a diary in which she wrote of her life as a minister's wife. Late one night, Jane crashes her car on the way home and is given a ride by Tom Sullivan, a mysterious but kind man passing by in a vintage black car. Tom pays for a tow truck for Jane and returns the following night with her car. Jane accepts his invitation to go boating on a nearby lake.

Later that night, Jane uncovers more details from Rebecca's diary that reveal she was indoctrinated by her boyfriend Robert, a devil worshipper, and was convinced to join him in a pact with Satan. Shortly after, she has a vivid nightmare in which the hearse takes her away as her aunt watches from the house, and Jane observes her funeral. Jane's mental stability is further challenged by other odd goings-on in the home, including the sounds of what she believes are people breaking in at night. She later sees a woman from one of her nightmares at the local church, but the Reverend Winston assuages her fears.

Once the house is finally probated to Jane, Pritchard confirms to her that Rebecca worshipped Satan, and that upon her death, the hearse carrying her body crashed on the nearby road; the driver of the hearse, along with Rebecca's body and her coffin, inexplicably disappeared. Since this event, locals have been haunted by the image of the hearse. Meanwhile, Jane continues her romance with Tom, and after a date, invites him into her home, where they have sex. Jane's romance with Tom upsets Paul, who expresses that he, too, is attracted to her.

One night, after Tom fails to arrive for a date, a drunken Pritchard begins vandalizing the home, causing Jane to flee in terror. Paul arrives shortly after to leave flowers for Jane, only to be attacked by an unseen assailant. Meanwhile, Jane arrives at Tom's house, but finds it inexplicably abandoned and dilapidated; she finds a framed antique photo of a young Rebecca with Tom. Behind the home, Jane finds a gravestone inscribed "Robert Thomas Sullivan". Terrified, Jane returns to her home to pack her belongings, intending to leave. In the bathroom, she finds Pritchard's corpse hanging in the shower, along with Paul's body.

Jane is confronted by Tom, who professes his love for her and explains that Rebecca was "too weak" and did not fulfill her pact with Satan. Promising Jane eternal life, he begins to cast a spell on her, but is interrupted by the Reverend Winston, who begins an exorcism to save Jane. She flees in her car, followed by Tom driving the hearse. The chase ends in a collision that causes the hearse to topple off a cliff and explode. Back at home, an apparition of Rebecca appears in the window as the house goes dark.

== Cast ==
- Trish Van Devere as Jane Hardy
- Joseph Cotten as Walter Pritchard
- David Gautreaux as Tom Sullivan
- Donald Hotton as Reverend Winston
- Med Flory as Sheriff Denton
- Donald Petrie as Luke
- Christopher McDonald as Pete
- Perry Lang as Paul Gordon
- Fred Franklyn as Mr. Gordon
- Al Hansen as Bo Rehnquist
- Dominic Barto as The Driver
- Nicholas Shields as Dr. Greenwalt
- Chuck Mitchell as Counterman
- Allison Balson as Alice
- Jim Gatherum as Boy #1
- Victoria Eubank as Lois
- Tanya Bowers as Schoolgirl
- Dennis Quaid as Repairman (uncredited)

== Production ==
Principal photography took place in San Francisco and Bradbury, California, beginning October 29, 1979. Filming was completed by January 1980.

Two 1952 Packard Funeral Coaches, converted by Henney Motor Company, were used in the film. One of them is prominently featured on the film's poster.

== Release ==
The Hearse opened in Kansas City, Missouri on March 21, 1980, followed by a release in Kennewick, Washington on March 26, 1980. It premiered in New York City on June 6, 1980, and had its Los Angeles premiere on September 12 of that year.

=== Home media ===
Rhino Entertainment released The Hearse on DVD on February 12, 2002. In May 2017, Vinegar Syndrome released the film in a Blu-ray/DVD combination pack, featuring a newly restored 2K scan of the original film elements.

== Reception ==
Roger Ebert of the Chicago Sun-Times wrote, "The Hearse qualifies as this summer's garage sale of horror movies. It contains all the best clichés from recent, more successful horror movies (especially [The] Amityville [Horror] and even The Changeling, which came out last April and starred Van Devere, her husband George C. Scott and, of course, the obligatory self-banging doors and self-playing musical instruments)."

Janet Maslin of The New York Times said, "The Hearse was directed by George Bowers, and shot either in a very stylized fashion or without benefit of a light meter – many of the film's outdoor scenes feature brilliant blue skies and actors with dim, shadowy faces. As far as the horror goes, Mr. Bowers makes his film moderately scary and pretty unpleasant, too. No one gets a hatchet in the forehead, though, the way one of the actors does in Friday the 13th. Isn't that nice to know?"
