= Lauren Gilbert =

American actor (1911–1998)

- Lauren Gilbert in The Addams Family 1965
- Born: Lauren Edwin Gilbert; April 29, 1927; Fairbury, Nebraska, U.S.
- Died: February 6, 1998 (aged 70); U.S.
- Education: Nebraska Wesleyan University; University of Michigan
- Occupation: Actor
- Years active: 1935–1974
- Spouse(s): Jackson Perkins (m. 1940; died 1994)
- Children: 3

Lauren Edwin Gilbert (April 8, 1911 – February 6, 1998) was an American actor, perhaps best known for his continuing roles on the soap operas Love of Life and The Edge of Night, portraying, respectively, the smitten Tom Craythorne and villainous Harry Lane. He also co-starred with Gene Kelly and Jocelyn Brando in the 1945 U. S. Navy-produced short subject Combat Fatigue Irritability.

== Early life and career ==
Born in Fairbury, Nebraska and raised in Kearney and Lincoln, Gilbert was the son of Rev. and Mrs. Marvin E. Gilbert. Having entered Nebraska Wesleyan University at age 15, Gilbert graduated with a Bachelor of Arts in 1930, and later earned his MA from the University of Michigan. In the interim, he was employed for three years as an announcer at radio station KFAB in Omaha.

Entering the U.S. Navy in October 1943, Gilbert was one of many Hollywood enlistees assigned to help in the production of Navy-produced films, in his case usually as a narrator. But the best known of these projects—at least since its release to the general public in 2013—is Combat Fatigue Irritability (1945), starring Gene Kelly as Bob Lucas, a traumatized Navy fireman, Jocelyn Brando as his fiancée Sue, and Gilbert as Dr. Bush, the psychiatric officer assigned to treat him.

In October 1949, a Kraft Television Theater episode entitled "To Dream Again" afforded Gilbert, by then an actor well versed in the works of Shakespeare, the rare opportunity to portray the Bard himself, seen here "return[ing] to England as a wise and worldly gentleman, sufficiently human to fall in love." Gilbert costars with Janet De Gore.

The summer of 1952 featured two TV collaborations with Grace Kelly, first on the Philco Playhouse episode, "Leaves Out of a Book," starring Gilbert and Claudia Morgan, and then, co-starring with Kelly in Kraft Television Theatre's presentation of the George S. Kaufman/Leueen MacGrath play, The Small Hours, detailing the last-minute salvation of a seemingly crumbling marriage.

In September 1960, Gilbert's brief return to the stage accompanied that of costar Joan Fontaine in the Paper Mill Playhouse revival of Rachel Crothers' Susan and God, with Gilbert cast as Susan's disconcerted, "driven to drink" spouse, who attempts to get—and stay—on board the wagon in hopes of rekindling their long dormant relationship. Later that month, it was reported that Gilbert had been signed for the role of Mr. Shelton in the Warner Brothers film, Girl of the Night, adapted from Dr. Harold Greenwald's psychoanalytic study, The Call Girl.

== Personal life ==
Beginning on December 29, 1940, in a ceremony conducted by his father, and continuing until her death in 1994, Gilbert was married to actress Jackson Perkins, whose onstage collaboration with her future husband extended at least as far back as 1934. Their union produced three children, a son and two daughters.

Gilbert died on February 6, 1998, at age 86, in Los Angeles.

== Works ==
=== Films ===
Film
Year	Title	Role	Notes
1945	Combat Fatigue Irritability	Dr. Bush	
1948	Close-Up	Miller	
1960	From the Terrace	Charles Frolick	
1960	Girl of the Night	Mr. Shelton	
1961	X-15	Colonel Jessup	
1963	Hootenanny Hoot	Howard Stauton	
1964	The Unsinkable Molly Brown	Mr. Fitzgerald	
1966	The Fortune Cookie	Kinkaid	
1973	Westworld	Supervisor	

=== Plays ===
Plays
Year	Play	Role	Theater	Notes
1938	Save Me the Waltz	Prince Paul	Martin Beck Theatre	February 28, 1938 - March 1938
1939	Hamlet	Francisco, Rosencrantz	44th Street Theatre	December 4, 1939 - January 6, 1940
1940	King Richard II	Duke of Aumerle	St. James Theatre	April 1, 1940 – April 27, 1940
1940	Twelfth Night	Orsino (Replacement)	St. James Theatre	November 19, 1940 – Mar 8, 1941
1940	Cue for Passion	Herbert Lee Phillips	Royale Theatre	December 19, 1940 – December 28, 1940
1942	Without Love	Paul Carrel (Replacement)	St. James Theatre	November 10, 1942 – February 13, 1943
1946	Flamingo Road	Fielding Carlisle	Belasco Theatre	March 19, 1946 – March 23, 1946
1947	Street Scene	Steve Sankey	Adelphi Theatre	Jan 9, 1947 – May 17, 1947
1948	The Vigil	Joseph of Arimathea	Royale Theatre	May 21, 1948 – May 29, 1948
1948	A Story for Strangers	Dunbar Stote	Royale Theatre	September 21, 1948 – September 25, 1948
1960	Roman Candle	Senator John Winston	Cort Theatre	February 3, 1960 – February 6, 1960
