= Movie Movie =

1978 double feature by Stanley Donen

- Theatrical release poster
- Directed by: Stanley Donen
- Screenplay by: Larry Gelbart; Sheldon Keller
- Produced by: Stanley Donen
- Starring: George C. Scott; Trish Van Devere; Barbara Harris; Red Buttons; Barry Bostwick; Ann Reinking; Art Carney; Eli Wallach
- Cinematography: Charles Rosher Jr. Bruce Surtees
- Edited by: George Hively
- Music by: Ralph Burns
- Production company: ITC Entertainment
- Distributed by: Warner Bros.
- Release date: November 22, 1978
- Running time: 105 minutes
- Country: United States
- Language: English
- Budget: $6 million

Movie Movie is a 1978 American double bill directed by Stanley Donen. It consists of two films: Dynamite Hands, a boxing ring morality play, and Baxter's Beauties of 1933, a musical comedy, both starring the husband-and-wife team of George C. Scott and Trish Van Devere. A fake trailer for a flying-ace movie set in World War I titled Zero Hour (also featuring Scott, Wallach, and Carney) is shown between the double feature.

Barry Bostwick, Red Buttons, Art Carney and Eli Wallach appear in both segments, with Harry Hamlin, Barbara Harris and Ann Reinking featured in one each. The script was written by Larry Gelbart and Sheldon Keller.

== Plot ==
The film is introduced by George "The Burns" Burns, who tells viewers that they are about to see an old-style double feature. In the old days, he explains, movies were in black-and-white except sometimes "when they sang it came out in color."

=== Dynamite Hands ===
Joey Popchik, a young man from a poor family, dreams of one day becoming a lawyer, even attending night school while selling food on the side. However, his sister is losing her eyesight and the only doctor who could possibly cure her costs around $25,000. This occurs after he encounters a gruff boxing manager in Gloves Malloy, who gave him a business card after he sees Joey pop an arrogant contender. As such, he becomes a boxer to raise the money to have her cured, complete with a handshake deal with Malloy (rather than a contract) with a guy named Peanuts as his second in the ring while a first fight is set up in quick time. Within a couple of months and over two dozen victories but a middling amount of money made, Joey wants to fight at the prominent venue of all in the Madison Square Garden. Vince Marlow, a crooked rival of Malloy, gets him a fight first in Hollywood while Popchik tries to make sure that Malloy never leaves his corner. Along the way, he gets seduced by fame and fortune. He finds that his sister has taken a liking to a gangster in Johnny Danko near to Marlow, and he reacts badly to seeing them together at first. Marlow, rejected by Popchik when he comes back to his senses, advises him to take a dive when it comes to the championship fight. He takes a beating in the first four rounds. Near the start of the fifth round, when he hears about his sister having gotten married in New Jersey and seeming happy with her new husband, decides to go all out for the round in fighting. Joey wins the fight with a tremendous round of blows. Malloy, having put the pieces together, tries to get Joey away from the angry Marlow (who bet all his money against him), but Malloy is shot and dies. Joey, so that "poetic justice could be served," races through law school to become the prosecutor that could prosecute Marlow. The jury, evidently moved with no need for deliberation, find Marlow guilty. After the trial ends, his sister, now cured, announces her pregnancy while Joey credits his friends in his corner as "a man can move mountains with his bare heart."

=== Baxter's Beauties of 1933 ===
Legendary theatrical producer Spats Baxter learns he's dying. To support the child he never knew after he dies, Baxter plans to create one last Broadway smash, Baxter's Beauties of 1933. He has never been able to face his child because his past alcoholism led to the death of his wife in a car crash. Instead of raising her as a single father, he sent her anonymous checks in the mail.

Kitty Simpson, a young ingenue with dreams of performing on Broadway, arrives to audition. Baxter's accountant, Dick Cummings, at heart a genius songwriter, writes an entirely new show in a couple of days.

Baxter's star, Isobel Stuart, is a spoiled alcoholic actress who almost destroys the entire production with her drunkenness and reckless spending of the show's money. At one point, the production requires $36,000 to save the show from being closed. Miraculously, Baxter receives a check from a mysterious benefactor who wants the show to go on.

Isobel, who has been enticing songwriter Cummings with her feminine wiles, see him kissing young Kitty Simpson backstage. In a jealous rage, Isobel tells Baxter to fire Simpson, or she will not perform in the show. With opening night in a few days, Baxter acquiesces to Isobel's demands.

Despite getting all of her demands met, two hours before the curtain is to rise on opening night, Isobel is found unconscious on her dressing room floor, passed out from drunkenness. Baxter fires her.

Without a leading lady, Baxter's Beauties 1933 appears ready to close before it opens. Luckily, Dick Cummings is there to tell Baxter that Kitty knows all of the songs and choreography, and that after being fired, she returned to New Rochelle. Baxter sends for her.

Trixie, a chorusgirl and Kitty's former roommate, tells Baxter that Kitty is the mysterious benefactor, having saved the $36,000 from checks she received throughout childhood from an unknown source. Baxter realizes that Kitty is his long lost child, and when she arrives, he claims her as his daughter.

Kitty and the company perform joyfully, and Kitty becomes a star. As the curtain falls, a dying Baxter tells her "One minute you're standing in the wings, the next minute you're wearing 'em."

== Cast ==
- George C. Scott as "Gloves" Malloy / "Spats" Baxter
- Trish Van Devere as Betsy McGuire / Isobel Stuart
- Red Buttons as "Peanuts" / "Jinks" Murphy
- Eli Wallach as Vince Marlow / Pop
- Rebecca York as Kitty
- Harry Hamlin as Joey Popchik
- Ann Reinking as "Troubles" Moran
- Jocelyn Brando as Mama Popchik / Mrs. Updike
- Michael Kidd as Pop Popchik
- Kathleen Beller as Angie Popchik
- Barry Bostwick as Johnny Danko / Dick Cummings
- Art Carney as Dr. Blaine / Dr. Bowers
- Clay Hodges as "Sailor" Lawson
- George P. Wilbur as Tony Norton
- Peter T. Stader as Barney Keegle
- James Lennon as The Announcer
- Barbara Harris as Trixie Lane
- Charles Lane as The Judge / Mr. Pennington
- Stanley Donen as Nightclub Emcee / Cab Driver (uncredited)
- George Burns as himself, Introductory Segments (uncredited)

== Production ==
The film originally was called Double Feature and was based on an idea of Larry Gelbart. He pitched the project in 1975 and was successful at Universal. He says it took him and co-writer Sheldon Keller six weeks to write the film and six months to get paid. In June 1976, Universal announced Gelbart would write, direct, and produce the film.

The studio disliked the script and allowed Gelbart to take it elsewhere. Gelbart showed it to Martin Starger, the American representative of Lew Grade. Both Starger and Grade loved the script; Grade had been a backer of Gelbart's Sly Fox and he agreed to finance Double Feature.

The budget was $6 million. Stanley Donen agreed to direct. Filming started in October 1977.

It was decided to shoot the film using color stock that could be printed in black-and-white to give the filmmakers the option of showing the film in black-and-white or color. The title was changed to Movie Movie because it was felt Double Feature might be confusing. There were plans to include a Flash Gordon-type serial, but this was not filmed.

George C. Scott said "Gelbart is such a good writer and the picture was so much fun I was almost ashamed to take the money."

The film was previewed extensively. As a result of the preview, a newsreel used to open the film was dropped, along with a trailer for a fake movie. A new ending was shot for "Dynamite Hands," which took one day. A prologue was added starring George Burns, in which Burns explained what double features were.

== Release ==
The film premiered at the Sutton Theatre in New York City on November 22, 1978. In the theatrical release, as George Burns leads us to expect in the film's prologue, "Dynamite Hands" and the mock film trailer (for Zero Hour, a flying-ace movie set in World War I) were in black-and-white, and the musical "Baxter's Beauties of 1933" was in color.

=== Critical reception ===
The film received generally positive reviews upon its release between November 1978 and February 1979. Charles Champlin of the Los Angeles Times called the film "a whizbang and hugely enjoyable exercise in nostalgia for the kind of all-singing, all-talking, all-dancing, all-corny movies that everybody says nobody makes any more. It celebrates, with accuracy, skill and warm affection, the plotty and propulsive film delights a later generation speaks of fervently as real, by God, movie movies, whence the title. The writers, Larry Gelbart and Sheldon Keller, have concocted a whole double feature: a fight film in period black and white and a musical in all the colors of a hyped-up rainbow, the two digest-sized movies linked by one of those hyperthyroid previews of coming attractions that are still, and they often were, better than the movie itself turns out to be." Vincent Canby of The New York Times wrote that "it seems so effortlessly funny that I suspect that the real intelligence and discipline that guide the project will be overlooked. Mr. Gelbart and Mr. Keller not only appreciate the comic uses of the mixed metaphor—one that is driven into the ground to the bursting point—but, more importantly, they have recreated the efficiency and manic, upbeat innocence of those Depression pictures. This has to do with more than screen styles—wacky montages and attention-getting wipes and fades, which anyone can imitate. The movie's spirits are high even when its eyes are filled with tears. The film makers genuinely like their models." Canby later ranked it as the fourth-best film of 1978, writing:

Forget the title—it's awful—but the film, Stanley Donen's remembrance of double‐features past, is a delight, composed of parodies of two 30's‐style pictures: a boxing melodrama called “Dynamite Hands” and a backstage musical, “Baxter's Beauties of 1933,” which means it would have come out in 1932. George C. Scott and Trish Van Devere star in both films and receive super support from Barry Bostwick, Barbara Harris, Eli Wallach, Ann Reinking, Rebecca York, Art Carney and Kathleen Beller. The script, which takes particular delight in scrambled language (people are inclined to say things like “I heard it in the papers”), is by Larry Gelbart and Sheldon Keller.

Desmond Ryan of The Philadelphia Inquirer wrote that the film "arrives at a time when much of what passes for comedy on the screen can be dismissed as parodies lost. That it is infinitely superior to the lame thrusts of such films as The Cheap Detective and The World's Greatest Lover is a tribute to both [Stanley Donen's] professional skills and the exuberant affection he brings to the task." Gene Siskel of the Chicago Tribune gave the film a three-and-a-half star rating, observing that it was "the idea of the very clever Larry Gelbart, who has written a number of M*A*S*H episodes and the comedy hit Oh, God!. Gelbart worked with Mel Brooks on the old Sid Caesar Your Show of Shows, and what Gelbart has done with Movie, Movie is affectionately kid '30s melodrama in the same way Brooks kidded '30s horror films in Young Frankenstein. Movie, Movie is full of in-jokes about '30s tear-jerkers. You will spend half your time looking for and laughing at the cliches." Tom McElfresh of The Cincinnati Enquirer called it "a film that carefully, affectionately, kids the socks off "those movies they used to make" back in the '30s. But—and here's the wonder of all the wonders in it—he has managed, somehow, to sweetly preserve the genuinely entertaining, if genuinely corny, impact of the same old movies he's teasing." Susan Stark of the Detroit Free Press said that "Donen gives us satire of the sweetest kind, looking back with affection upon the kinds of stories the movies gave us 40 years ago, and also reverting to the style in which those screen stories were told. Those who remember montages with train wheels clacking out the passage of time and newspaper headlines shouting advancements of plot will get nostalgia's special pleasure out of 'Movie, Movie.' Those who have never seen that kind of montage, or the use of the 'iris' to mark scene changes, or even the obligatory overhead 'kaleidoscope' shot of a Busby Berkeley production number, will find the film educational as well as entertaining." Donna Chernin of The Plain Dealer remarked that "recent comic tributes to bygone film genres (specifically Mel Brooks' 'Young Frankenstein' and 'Silent Movie') cantered along humorously for a while, but eventually trotted out too much clumsy slapstick. "Movie Movie" gallops along beautifully; most brilliantly, the creators know when to quit. Wilted cliches becomes crisp quips, especially enhanced by the straight delivery of the cast."

Corbin Patrick of The Indianapolis Star said that "the clever scripts as written by Larry Gelbart and Sheldon Keller do not hold these memory gems up to ridicule. They are treated fondly, and in good humor. And the playing by George Scott. Trish Van Devere and others, most of whom appear in both segments, is beautiful." David Mannweiler of The Indianapolis News said that "if this inviting spoof of the highly stylized Hollywood formula films of the 1930s is seen in the right frame of mind, it qualifies as the funniest movie of 1978, the year in which it was released. It certainly is much more sophisticated and energetic than recent parodies of "old" films by Mel Brooks ('Silent Movie') or Neil Simon ('The Cheap Detective')." John M. McGuire of the St. Louis Post-Dispatch wrote that it "comes dangerously close to being an overdose of schmaltz. But that's the beauty of this delightfully wacky takeoff of a 1930's double feature, it never quite reaches the point of 'enough, enough.' Of course it helps to have George C. Scott, Eli Wallach, Art Carney, Red Buttons and Trish Van Devere in your repertory company, playing such diverse roles as a grandfatherly fight manager; a dandified musical comedy producer; an Oil Can Harry gangster; an Oil Can Harry World War I flying ace; a slightly punchy prize-fight corner man; Pop, the stage door watchman; a heart-as-pure-as-gold-librarian and a sultry, temperamental, but fading Broadway star. It also helps, in my opinion, to have Ann Reinking glittering-up the place. This is her first movie part, and the dancing sensation of the musical, 'Chicago,' plays a steamy-blonde movie vamp the equal of Mae West or Jean Harlow." Bruce McCabe of The Boston Globe called the film "first-rate fun" and wrote that it "succeeds as one movie because each movie within it works. They work because Stanley Donen, the producer and director, brought many MGM musicals to the screen." George Anderson of the Pittsburgh Post-Gazette said it was "like all the films you grew up with, yet it's like no other movie around right now. That seeming contradiction explains its special appeal." A critic for the San Francisco Chronicle called it "a delightful, funny, novel and loving parody of the melodramatic dramas and musicals of the '30s."

Eleanor Ringel of The Atlanta Constitution called the parodies "dead-on". Perry Stewart of the Fort Worth Star-Telegram said that "a picture like Movie Movie, which lovingly satirizes the sentimental film fare of the 1930s, could be expected to fall on its film can in the cynical Seventies. But all I can say is I enjoyed it." William Mootz of The Courier-Journal in Louisville, Kentucky, wrote that it "happily recalls the innocent pleasures of going to the Bijou back in the 1930s, when talkies were young and so was Hollywood. It floated blithely Into the Showcase Cinemas [on January 26, 1979] to brighten this generally sad-sack movie season." Don Morrison of The Minneapolis Star called it "an absolutely delectable movie, a double-whammy spoof on the old movie-type movies of 40 years ago. It carries off this risky assignment with such bouncing style that you are hugging yourself with glee at every hokey scene and every luscious line of dopey dialogue. It amounts to a paste-up of specimens from 1930s Warner Brothers movies not the actual footage, but adroitly skewed museum-replicas of the ideas, attitudes, characters, stories and settings of that studio-factory's output, which kept myriad Depression-era filmgoers happily entertained." Terry Lawson of The Journal-Herald in Dayton, Ohio, called it "a hilarious, loving tribute to 1930s film fare, particularly the films that originated at Warner Brothers' studios. And the two hours you spend laughing your way through Movie Movie may be the best time you've had at a movie house since Animal House."

Dave Chenowith of the Montreal Gazette wrote his review of the film under the pseudonym of Louella Hopper, saying that "it's so good to see a movie that knows what entertainment is all about—good, clean fun like we used to see when Jack Warner and that nice Mr. Goldfish were still alive—not like so much of the so-called 'hard-hitting' violence and dirt the studios shovel out today. (Remember what that poor Sen. McCarthy once told me in the MGM cafeteria: 'A cynic is just a Commie who wants to be rich.' Wasn't that the truth. . .) Well, Movie Movie is something different. Director Stanley Donen (I remember him when he was still in flannels, directing Singin' in the Rain) has made two movies in one and they're both beautiful takeoffs on those terrific Grade-B films of the 1930s. That's why The Gazette has asked me to come out of retirement and tell you all about it."

Internationally, Alexander Walker of the London Evening Standard called it "the happiest package deal on the current screen" while John Lapsley of the Sydney Sun-Herald called it "an appreciative send-up of films the way they were in 1933 when Hollywood's answer to the Depression was a flood of fairy tales about shoe-shine boys becoming stars" and Colin Bennett of The Age in Melbourne called it "a lot of innocent nostalgic fun".

Not everyone praised it, however. Rex Reed said it was "the latest in a long and boring series of remakes", and added that "all they've proved is that they can make old movies that are just as dumb as they made them 40 years ago; in their attempts at parody, they've ended up creating the same thing they're sending up." Clyde Gilmour of the Toronto Star wrote that "George Burns introduces the film (at the Uptown 3) in a prologue obviously tacked on at the last minute—and the famous old funnyman doesn't say anything funny. True enough, there are some laughs in what follows. For me, however, there are not nearly enough of them in this fond lampoon of the sorts of movies that were being cranked out on an assembly-line basis at the Warner Bros. studio in the ’30s."

Four reviews of the film are listed on Rotten Tomatoes, which does not have a sufficient score on the film as of 2023.

=== Proposed sequel ===
Lew Grade liked the movie so much that he commissioned a sequel. In October 1978, he said this would be called Movie Movie Two and would be written by Gelbart and Keller and once more directed by Donen. Gelbart wrote a script which is among his papers at UCLA, but it went unproduced.

The movie failed at the box office. Grade blamed poor distribution from Warner Bros. This contributed to Grade deciding to help set up his own distribution company, Associated Film Distribution, with ultimately disastrous financial consequences for him and his company.

== Home media ==
Some home video editions (like the 1980 Magnetic Video Corporation edition) featured the original color version of "Dynamite Hands" that was printed on black-and-white film stock during its theatrical release.

The film was released on Blu-ray by Scorpion Releasing June 28, 2016.

== Awards and honors ==
Year	Award	Category	Recipient(s) and nominee(s)	Result
1978	Los Angeles Film Critics Association	Best Screenplay	Larry Gelbart, Sheldon Keller	3rd place
1978	Los Angeles Film Critics Association	Best Music	Ralph Burns	3rd place
1978	National Board of Review	Top Ten Films		Won
1978	New York Film Critics Circle	Best Supporting Actor	Barry Bostwick	3rd place
1978	New York Film Critics Circle	Best Screenplay	Larry Gelbart, Sheldon Keller	2nd place
1979	Golden Globe Award	Best Motion Picture - Musical or Comedy		Nominated
1979	Golden Globe Award	Best Actor in a Motion Picture - Musical or Comedy	George C. Scott	Nominated
1979	Golden Globe Award	Best Motion Picture Acting Debut - Male	Harry Hamlin	Nominated
1979	Berlin International Film Festival	Golden Bear	Stanley Donen	Nominated
1979	National Society of Film Critics	Best Supporting Actor	Barry Bostwick	4th place
1979	National Society of Film Critics	Best Screenplay	Larry Gelbart, Sheldon Keller	3rd place
1979	Writers Guild of America Award	Best Comedy Written Directly for the Screen	Larry Gelbart, Sheldon Keller	Won
1980	David di Donatello	Best Foreign Music	Ralph Burns	Won

== See also ==
- List of boxing films
- Grindhouse (2007), a similar double-bill concept
- B movie
- Classical Hollywood cinema
