= David Gautreaux =

American actor

- Born: June 28, 1951 (age 75); Rhode Island
- Occupations: Stage, television and film actor
- Known for: The role of Vulcan science officer Xon in the proposed Star Trek: Phase II television series
- Notable work: Star Trek: The Motion Picture, Man From Atlantis, Search for Tomorrow

David Gautreaux (born June 28, 1951) is an American stage, television and film actor, perhaps best known for work he never did – the role of Vulcan science officer Xon in the proposed Star Trek: Phase II television series. When the series was aborted, he was given the role of Commander Branch in Star Trek: The Motion Picture.

== Early life ==
Gautreaux was born in Rhode Island.

== Career ==
He has guest-starred in numerous television series including Man From Atlantis, Search for Tomorrow, One Life to Live, T. J. Hooker, L. A. Law, The Fall Guy, ER, Rules of Engagement, Boston Legal, Melrose Place, The West Wing, NCIS, The Blacklist, For All Mankind, S.W.A.T., The Night Agent, and The Beast. He played recurring roles on Franklin & Bash and Damages.

== Star Trek: Phase II ==
When Paramount Pictures announced plans to make a new Star Trek series in 1977, Leonard Nimoy declined to reprise his role of Spock. The character of Lieutenant Xon – a 22-year-old full Vulcan officer – was created to fill the void. The series was to premiere in 1978, but the studio decided to instead bring the franchise back as a motion picture. With Nimoy now on board, Gautreaux was given the small role of Commander Branch, leader of Epsilon 9, a space station destroyed by the "V'Ger" cloud early in the film.

== Partial filmography ==
- Star Trek: The Motion Picture (1979) – Commander Branch
- The Hearse (1980) – Tom Sullivan
- Troop Beverly Hills (1989) – Mr. DiBlasio
- Animal Instincts II (1994) – Phillip
- The Zone (1995) – Rich Hazen
- Decaf (1996)
- Ghost Whisperer (2007) – Erwin Sembrook
