= One Is a Lonely Number =

1972 film by Mel Stuart

- Original film poster
- Directed by: Mel Stuart
- Screenplay by: David Seltzer
- Based on: "The Good Humor Man" by Rebecca Morris
- Produced by: Stan Margulies
- Starring: Trish Van Devere; Monte Markham; Janet Leigh; Melvyn Douglas
- Cinematography: Michel Hugo
- Edited by: David Saxon
- Music by: Michel Legrand
- Distributed by: Metro-Goldwyn-Mayer
- Release date: June 19, 1972
- Running time: 97 minutes
- Country: United States
- Language: English

One Is a Lonely Number (also known as Two Is a Happy Number) is a 1972 American drama film directed by Mel Stuart, and starring Trish Van Devere, Janet Leigh, and Melvyn Douglas. The screenplay, based upon the 1967 The New Yorker short story "The Good Humor Man" by Rebecca Morris, was written by David Seltzer.

== Plot ==
Aimee Brower wakes and finds her husband James has left her. After learning everything about why he did it, she then proceeds to put her life back together.

== Cast ==
- Trish Van Devere as Aimee Brower
- Monte Markham as Howard Carpenter
- Janet Leigh as Gert Meredith
- Melvyn Douglas as Joseph Provo
- Jane Elliot as Madge Frazier
- Jonathan Lippe as Sherman Cooke
- Mark Bramhall as Morgue Attendant
- Paul Jenkins as James Brower
- A. Scott Beach as Frawley King
- Henry Leff as Arnold Holzgang
- Dudley Knight as King Lear
- Maurice Argent as Pool Manager
- Thomas McNallan as Hardware Clerk
- Joseph Spano as Earl of Kent
- Morgan Upton as Earl of Gloucester
- Kim Allen as Ronnie Porter
- Peter Fitzsimmons as Employment Office Clerk
- Christopher Brooks as Marvin Friedlander
- Kathleen Quinlan (uncredited)

== Awards and nominations ==
Golden Globe Awards

- 1973: Nominated, Best Motion Picture Actress in a Dramatic Film - Trish Van Devere

== See also ==
- List of American films of 1972
