= Rex (musical) =

- Music: Richard Rodgers
- Lyrics: Sheldon Harnick
- Book: Sherman Yellen
- Productions: 1976 Broadway; 2010 Toronto; 2017 Utah Festival Opera and Musical Theatre

Rex is a musical with music by Richard Rodgers, lyrics by Sheldon Harnick and libretto by Sherman Yellen, based on the life of King Henry VIII. The original production starred Nicol Williamson.

== Production history ==
Following tryout engagements in Delaware, Washington and Boston, it opened on Broadway at the Lunt-Fontanne Theatre on April 25, 1976, and closed June 5, 1976, after 14 previews and 49 regular performances. During tryouts, Harold Prince took over as director (uncredited), with the original director Edwin Sherin remaining. It is remembered for being a rare instance of a Richard Rodgers flop, and for being one of the early Broadway appearances of actress Glenn Close, her first in a musical. Until the Canadian premiere of Rex in 2010, this show was the only Richard Rodgers work since the 1940s not available for performance from the Rodgers and Hammerstein Organization. Clive Barnes, reviewing for The New York Times, wrote that it was "one of the most interminable musicals in years."

Andrew Lloyd Webber persuaded his then-wife, Sarah Brightman to record the ballad "Away From You", the only song from the musical that has been separately released.

Years after the show closed, and after Rodgers's death, Sheldon Harnick and Sherman Yellen reworked the musical, attempting to make its lead character more sympathetic, presenting it in a concert performance as part of the York Theatre's "Musicals In Mufti" series starring Melissa Errico and Patrick Page in 2000. It also had a one-night performance at Stages!, the Chicago Festival of New Musicals in 2007.

The first fully staged production of the revised version took place in February, 2010 in Toronto, Canada.

== Broadway cast ==
- Nicol Williamson as Henry VIII, King of England
- Tom Aldredge as Will Somers
- Penny Fuller as Anne Boleyn and Princess Elizabeth
- Barbara Andres as Catherine of Aragon
- Glenn Close as Princess Mary
- Martha Danielle as Queen Claude of France, Lady Margaret, and Queen Katherine Parr of England
- Ed Evanko as Mark Smeaton
- William Griffis as Cardinal Thomas Wolsey
- Charles Rule as Duke of Norfolk
- Michael John as Prince Edward
- Merwin Goldsmith as Comus
- Craig Lucas - Ensemble
- Valerie Mahaffey as Catherine Howard, Ensemble
- Stephen D. Newman as Francis, King of France
- Sparky Shapiro as Young Princess Elizabeth
- April Shawhan as Jane Seymour
- Lillian Shelby as Nurse, Ensemble

== Canadian premiere ==
Rex had its Canadian premiere in February 2010, in a newly revised version by Sheldon Harnick and Sherman Yellen, presented at the Fairview Library Theatre in Toronto. Much of the score and script was heavily revised by Messrs. Harnick and Yellen for this production.

Canadian Premiere cast

- Joe Cascone as Henry VIII, King of England
- David Haines as Will Somers
- Ashley Gibson as Anne Boleyn and Princess Elizabeth
- Carol Kugler as Catherine of Aragon
- Elizabeth Rose Morriss as Princess Mary
- Damien Gulde as Mark Smeaton
- Eric Botosan as Comus
- Lloyd Dean as Cardinal Thomas Wolsey
- Andrea Barker as Jane Seymour
- Max Lee as Prince Edward
- Susan Sanders as Catherine Parr
- Larry Gibbs as King Francis I of France
- Stephanie Douglas as Queen Claude of France

In this revised version, the songs "So Much You Loved Me," "Dear Jane" and "Tell Me, Daisy" which were cut from the original production, were restored, as was Henry's eleventh hour musical soliloquy "The Pears of Anjou." Further, two problematic songs "Wee Golden Warrior" and "Why?" were dropped.

Owing to the success of the Canadian production, Rex is reportedly being prepared for inclusion in the Rodgers & Hammerstein catalog of available musicals for production.

== Plot ==
Act One opens in 1520 at the Field of Cloth of Gold in Calais, France, a peace treaty organized by Cardinal Wolsey, Archbishop of York. Henry VIII, king of England is there with his wife, Catherine of Aragon, daughter Mary and a large part of his court, including his fool, Will Somers, and the court musician Mark Smeaton with whom he shares his latest song composition, “No Song More Pleasing” which charms and delights everyone present.

At the meeting with King Francis of France, Henry meets Anne Boleyn and immediately becomes smitten with her. Having failed to produce a male heir with his wife Catherine (“Where is My Son?”), Henry considers divorcing her and marrying Anne. Henry's court astrologer Comus, along with Will Somers, Mark Smeaton and Cardinal Wolsey humorously lament Henry's notorious wandering eye in “The Chase” leaving Henry to pluck the petals from a daisy to prophesize the outcome of his desire for Anne. Catherine refuses to grant Henry a divorce, so Henry founds the Church of England, and thus divorces and banishes Catherine.

Passionately in love, Henry and Anne admit that they cannot bear to be “Away From You”, but after their marriage, things sour when Anne gives birth, not to a son, but to daughter “Elizabeth.” Things become further strained as Anne becomes intrigued with Mark Smeaton, and Henry with Jane Seymour, one of Anne's ladies-in-waiting. Charges of treason against Anne and Smeaton are laid and they are found guilty. Shortly before her execution, Anne and Henry reflect on their time together, “So Much You Loved Me.” Will promises Anne that he will look after Elizabeth. Henry marries Jane Seymour and they have a son together, Edward, but Jane dies in childbirth, leaving Henry conflicted as he rejoices in the arrival of his son, but questioning his methods in this pursuit.

Act Two opens 10 years later. Since the end of Act One, Henry has had three more wives: Anne of Cleves (divorced) and Catherine Howard (executed) and is now married to Katharine Parr, a matronly widow, who satisfies the elder Henry's need for companionship in his later years. Edward is now a child of 10, Elizabeth is a healthy young woman and, joined by their half-sister, Mary, they celebrate “Christmas at Hampton Court.” Francis of France arrives to discuss the terms for peace at the holiday and brings Henry a gift: pear trees from Anjou, a rare fruit which comes to fruition once every ten years. Following a ferocious altercation with Elizabeth, Henry realizes that he admires her regal courage and that Elizabeth is the "son" he never had; but to love and admire her duly, it must be “From Afar” and he banishes her from the kingdom. Will Somers cheers Elizabeth up, and then proceeds to humorously torment Comus who is in the course of charting the worst prediction of his career: Edward will not live to maturity and Elizabeth will become a great leader. Henry falls ill and reflects on the events and motives in his life, and while he is still determined to live to see the fruition of “The Pears of Anjou,” he dies. Elizabeth gives encouragement to the nervous Edward, telling him that with courage and determination, he will be a fine king "In Time." Edward ascends to the throne, but in a final tableau, we see Henry's realization and acceptance that Elizabeth will become the great ruler that he had always wanted to bequeath to England.

== Songs ==
Act 1

- "No Song More Pleasing" - Henry VIII and Mark Smeaton
- "The Field of Cloth of Gold" - King Frances, King Henry, Wolsey, Company
- "Where Is My Son?" - Henry VIII
- "Basse Dances" - Company
- "The Chase" - Comus, Will Somers, Mark Smeaton and Gentlemen
- "Why?" - Henry VIII
- "Away From You" - Henry VIII
- "As Once I Loved You" - Queen Catherine
- "Away From You" (reprise) - Anne Boleyn and Henry VIII
- "Elizabeth" - Mark Smeaton, Lady Margaret and Lady in Waiting
- "No Song More Pleasing" (reprise) - Lady Jane Seymour and Henry VIII
- "Away From You" (reprise) - Anne Boleyn
- "Te Deum" - Company

Act 2

- "Christmas at Hampton Court" - Princess Elizabeth, Prince Edward and Princess Mary
- "The Wee Golden Warrior" - Will Somers, Prince Edward, Princess Elizabeth, Ladies and Gentlemen
- "The Masque" - Will Somers, Prince Edward, Princess Elizabeth, Princess Mary, Ladies and Gentlemen
- "Sword Dance" - Sword Dancers
- "From Afar" - Henry VIII
- "In Time" - Princess Elizabeth and Will Somers
- "In Time" (reprise) - Princess Elizabeth and Prince Edward
- "Te Deum" (reprise) - Company

Songs cut before New York opening: "So Much You Loved Me," "Dear Jane," "Tell Me, Daisy," "Rex," "I'll Miss You" and "The Pears of Anjou"
