= David Cantor =

American actor and singer

David Cantor (born 1954) is an American actor and singer from New York City best known for his stage work in musical theatre, including appearances on Broadway in the musical Evita and in both comic and dramatic roles in a number of national tours, Off-Broadway and regional productions. He has also played roles in films and television.

== Biography ==
Cantor was raised in Pleasantville, New York and attended Indiana University, the Guildhall School of Music and Drama, and the American Academy of Dramatic Arts.

Cantor first appeared on Broadway covering the role of Che in Evita (1982) and then playing Che in the first national tour of the musical on the U.S. west coast. The New York Times later wrote on July 14, 1985, of Cantor's performance in a regional theatre production of Evita: "David Cantor, a veteran in the part, is a marvelous Che, never lapsing into excessive snideness, singing gorgeously and, at times, sailing into the stratosphere with his crystalline 'high-flying, adored' pianissimi." His next role on Broadway was Bobinet in La Vie parisienne by Jacques Offenbach (1983). He also played Benny in a national tour of The Desert Song by Sigmund Romberg (1988).

Cantor appeared Off-Broadway for over 400 performances as Amshel Rothschild and occasionally as Nathan Rothschild in the critically acclaimed 1990–91 revival of The Rothschilds at Circle in the Square theater. His other stage credits include Benedick in Much Ado About Nothing (1978); Tony Lumpkin in She Stoops to Conquer (1978); Infielder in Damn Yankees with Starlight Theatre in Kansas City, Missouri (1978); Matt in The Fantasticks in a production directed by the show's creators, Tom Jones and Harvey Schmidt (1982); The Princess Pat (1981); John Adams in 1776 (1982); Charlie in Tintypes (1986); Stanley Jerome in both Brighton Beach Memoirs (1986) and Broadway Bound (1987); Seymour in Little Shop of Horrors (1987); Vernon Gersch in They're Playing Our Song (1988); Benny in The Desert Song at North Shore Music Theatre (1988). Cantor has performed principal roles in all of the Gilbert and Sullivan comic operas in the U.S., Great Britain, and Italy.

Cantor appeared in the films Prince of the City (1981), So Fine (1981), The Chosen (1981) and Working Girl (1988). In the early 1980s, he played a number of television soap opera roles in All My Children, Loving, Another World, and Ryan's Hope.

== Personal ==
Cantor owns and operates SmartStaff Personnel, a staffing and placement firm in Berkeley Heights, New Jersey. Cantor lives in New Jersey with his wife Karen, a musical theatre teacher (formerly an actress) and children.
