= The Rothschilds (musical) =

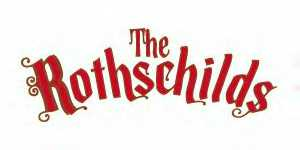
- Logo
- Music: Jerry Bock
- Lyrics: Sheldon Harnick
- Book: Sherman Yellen
- Basis: The Rothschilds by Frederic Morton
- Productions: 1970 Broadway; 1990 Off-Broadway

The Rothschilds is a musical with a book by Sherman Yellen, lyrics by Sheldon Harnick and music by Jerry Bock.

Based on The Rothschilds by Frederic Morton, it tells of the rise of the Rothschild family from humble beginnings in Germany, to their founding of their financial empire and growing political influence under the guidance of patriarch Mayer Rothschild, to their assistance in funding Napoleon's defeat, and how they secure a declaration of rights for European Jews in the midst of an oppressive era.

The Rothschilds was the last collaboration between Bock and Harnick. (Note: The exception is the song "Topsy-Turvy", written for the 2004 Broadway revival of Fiddler on the Roof.) The musical ran on Broadway in 1970, earning nine Tony Award nominations, and was revived successfully Off-Broadway in 1990. A 2015 reworking of the show was praised for clarifying the show and was recorded on JAY records.

== Productions ==
In 1968, Derek Goldby was engaged as the show's director. During out-of-town tryouts, he was replaced by Michael Kidd, which caused a disagreement between Bock and Harnick that ended their partnership.

After thirteen previews, the Broadway production, produced by Emanuel Azenberg and directed and choreographed by Kidd, opened on October 19, 1970, at the Lunt-Fontanne Theatre, where it ran for 505 performances, closing on January 1, 1972. The cast included Hal Linden as Mayer Rothschild, Leila Martin as Gutele, Jill Clayburgh as Hannah Cohen, Keene Curtis in the multiple roles of the various national leaders doing business with the Rothschild family (Prince William of Hesse, Joseph Fouché, Herries, and Prince Metternich), Paul Hecht as Nathan Rothschild, Chris Sarandon as Jacob Rothschild, and Robby Benson as young Solomon Rothschild. Reid Shelton replaced Curtis later in the run. The show enjoyed a second production in San Francisco.

An Off-Broadway revival directed by Lonny Price and choreographed by Michael Arnold opened on February 10, 1990, at the American Jewish Theatre, where it ran for 435 performances. The cast included Mike Burstyn as Mayer, Leslie Ellis as Hannah, Allen Fitzpatrick in the multiple roles of Prince William of Hesse, Joseph Fouché, Herries, and Prince Metternich, Robert Cuccioli as Nathan, and David Cantor as Amshel.

== Synopsis ==
In 1772 Frankfurt, Germany, Jews are restricted to living in the ghetto and frequently are the victims of violence (“Pleasure and Privilege”). Mayer Amschel Rothschild returns from Hanover, where he was an apprentice banker, to make his fortune in his home town. Because only twelve Jewish marriages are permitted in a given year, he is forced to come up with a plan in order to marry his fiancée Gutele (“One Room”). He reopens his shop, carrying goods and rare coins. At the Frankfurt Fair, he entices Prince William of Hesse with fanciful tales about rare coins (“He Tossed A Coin”), then bribes the prince in order to marry Gutele. Later, Mayer becomes agent for the court bankers, but he wants more.

By 1778, Mayer and Gutele have five sons (“Sons”), each of whom enters the business as soon as he is old enough. As they age, they and their father chafe at the many restrictions and indignities heaped upon Jews (“Everything”). In 1804, their success and their chutzpah take them to Denmark as superior court agents to the Danish king when Hesse must loan money to him to help fight a war (“Rothschilds and Sons”). However, Hesse is overthrown by Napoleon, and Minister of Police Joseph Fouché takes over (“Allons”). When Mayer and his sons return to Germany, they find no court for which they can be agents. Mayer sends his older sons off to collect Hesse's debts before the French can get them, and sends his younger son, Nathan, to London to invest the money (“Sons" (reprise)).

Initially awkward in England, Nathan soon displays considerable investing talents (“This Amazing London Town”). He falls in love with Hannah Cohen, an aristocratic English "Jewish Joan of Arc" devoted to charitable works (“I’m in Love! I’m in Love!”). He eventually wins her over by pledging to loan money to England to help win their war against Napoleon if the Chancellor of the Exchequer Herries pledges to make Germany and Austria lift their restrictions on Jews. In Germany, Prince Metternich promises roughly the same thing if the Rothschilds make the loan (“Have You Ever Seen a Prettier Congress”). In 1818, Metternich reneges on his bargain, and old Mayer dies, broken-hearted (“In My Lifetime”). His sons scheme to force Metternich to come to terms by continually undercutting his price for peace bonds, although the plan brings them to the brink of bankruptcy (“Bonds”). Metternich not only concedes but is forced to guarantee that all state bonds will be handled by the House of Rothschild. The ghetto walls are torn down, and Mayer's dream is realized.

== Song list ==
Act I

- Prologue: Pleasure and Privilege – Prince William of Hesse
- One Room – Mayer and Gutele (Mama)
- He Tossed a Coin – Mayer, Vendors and Ensemble
- Sons – Mayer, Gutele, Young Amshel, Young Solomon, Young Nathan and Young Jacob
- Everything – Nathan, Gutele, Solomon, Kalman, Amshel and Jacob
- Rothschild and Sons – Mayer, Nathan, Solomon, Kalman, Amshel and Jacob
- Allons – Joseph Fouche and Male Ensemble
- Rothschild and Sons (reprise) – Mayer, Nathan, Solomon, Kalman, Amshel and Jacob
- Sons (reprise) – Gutele (Mama) Rothschild and Mayer Rothschild

Act II

- Hymn: Give England Strength – Herries and Male Ensemble
- This Amazing London Town – Nathan Rothschild
- They Say – Sceptic and Male Ensemble
- I'm in Love! I'm in Love! – Nathan Rothschild
- I'm in Love! I'm in Love! (reprise) – Hannah Cohen
- In My Own Lifetime – Mayer Rothschild
- Have You Ever Seen a Prettier Little Congress? – Prince Metternich
- Stability – Prince Metternich and Ensemble
- Bonds – Nathan, Solomon, Kalman, Amshel, Jacob, Prince Metternich and Ensemble

== Adaptation: Rothschild & Sons ==
In 2015, Harnick and Yellen revised the musical as Rothschild & Sons, greatly restructuring the book as a one-act show and adding previously written but unheard Harnick and Bock songs. The story focuses on Mayer Rothschild's relationships with his sons. It was produced off-Broadway by York Theatre at the Theater at St. Peter's from October to November 2015 and directed by Jeffrey B. Moss. Robert Cuccioli, who played Nathan Rothschild in the 1990 production, played Mayer, Glory Crampton was Gutele. The production received mixed notices. Musical Theatre Review wrote that "Harnick has also written a host of clear, concise lyrics that help further the plot, and the storytelling is further enhanced by Moss’ fluid staging and a host of fine performances, especially the powerful portrayal of Mayer by Robert Cuccioli."

Victor Gluck called the production "engrossing and admirable," while The New York Times praised the "rich new production", noting the "splendid 18th-century men’s costumes by Carrie Robbins, low-key yet opulent scenic design (palaces versus the Frankfurt ghetto) by James Morgan [and] assertively nuanced lighting by Kirk Bookman." The show was recorded on JAY Records and filmed for the archive at Lincoln Center.

== Awards and nominations ==
Year	Award	Category	Nominee	Result
1971	Tony Award	Best Musical		Nominated
1971	Tony Award	Best Book of a Musical	Sherman Yellen	Nominated
1971	Tony Award	Best Original Score	Jerry Bock and Sheldon Harnick	Nominated
1971	Tony Award	Best Performance by a Leading Actor in a Musical	Hal Linden	Won
1971	Tony Award	Best Performance by a Featured Actor in a Musical	Keene Curtis	Won
1971	Tony Award	Best Direction of a Musical	Michael Kidd	Nominated
1971	Tony Award	Best Choreography	Michael Kidd	Nominated
1971	Tony Award	Best Lyrics	Sheldon Harnick	Nominated
1971	Tony Award	Best Scenic Design	John Bury	Nominated
