= Harold Greenwald =

American psychotherapist

Harold Greenwald (July 28, 1910 – March 26, 1999) was a noted psychotherapist who pioneered a variation on rational emotive behavior therapy, "direct decision therapy." He was an expert on the psychology of prostitution, and authored a dissertation on call girls that became a best-selling book and movie.

== Early life and education ==
Greenwald was born on the Lower East Side of Manhattan, the son of Abraham Greenwald, a barber, and his wife, Lillian, who were Jewish refugees from Czarist Russia. His younger brother, Milton, later known by the stage name Michael Kidd, became an acclaimed choreographer and occasional actor on Broadway and in Hollywood movies.

Harold Greenwald graduated from the City College of New York in 1933, and worked for the New York City Housing Authority and city planning board. He was a civilian instructor for the U.S. Army Air Forces during World War II.

== Direct Decision Therapy ==
Greenwald turned to the study of psychology while in his 40s, and in 1956 earned a doctorate from Columbia University. He became prominent among psychoanalysts circles as a leading student of Theodore Reik, a disciple of Sigmund Freud. He became president of the National Psychological Association for Psychoanalysis, which promotes Freudian therapy, early in his career. However, Greenwald chafed at the long periods of quiet listening required in Freudian psychoanalysis, so he developed direct decision therapy. He believed that decisions were at the root of understanding dysfunctional behavior and personality disorders, and that people are free to change their decisions as they go through life. He even believed that happiness "could be made as a decision."

Greenwald, who was founder and president of the Direct Decision Therapy Institute, found that there were geographic differences in happiness, with people living on the West Coast more likely to say that they were happy than people living in the east. He said in a 1984 interview that "people who live on the East Coast seem to think it makes you more superficial to be happy. It's scary to be happy. Some people think that if you're happy, other people will hate you" and make demands.

== Prostitution research ==
In the 1950s, Greenwald carried out work for a doctoral dissertation on the psychology of prostitutes. He interviewed 16 prostitutes, of whom six were in analysis with him, with the other ten interviewed by three of the other prostitutes who were his patients. His dissertation, published in 1958 as The Call Girl: A Social and Analytic Study, humanized the women and explored the reasons for their career choice. He explained in the book that most came from unhappy childhoods and suffered from insufficient parental love.

Greenwald's research found that prostitutes utilized defense mechanisms to cope with their profession, which included masochism, and denying to themselves that they were having sex.

The book became a best seller, translated into seven languages and selling more than a million copies. It was adapted into the 1960 film Girl of the Night, starring Anne Francis and featuring Lloyd Nolan as psychotherapist. Greenwald became a popular speaker at psychological gatherings a result of the book.

In 1970, a new edition of the book was published, titled The Elegant Prostitute. The book was retitled to emphasize how call girls were better looking and more refined than their "street walking" counterparts.

== Academic posts ==
Greenwald taught at Hofstra University, and was a Visiting Fulbright Fellow at the University of Bergen in Norway. He became a distinguished professor at the United States International University, and served as president of the Academy of Psychologists in Marital and Family Therapy. He was president of the division of Humanistic Psychology of the American Psychological Association.
