= Girl of the Night =

1960 American film

- Directed by: Joseph Cates
- Written by: Ted Berkman; Raphael Blau
- Based on: The Call Girl by Harold Greenwald
- Produced by: Max Rosenberg
- Starring: Anne Francis; Lloyd Nolan; Kay Medford; John Kerr; Arthur Storch
- Cinematography: Joseph C. Brun
- Edited by: Aram Avakian
- Music by: Sol Kaplan
- Production company: Vanguard Productions
- Distributed by: Warner Bros. Pictures
- Release date: November 11, 1960
- Running time: 93 minutes
- Country: United States
- Language: English

Girl of the Night is a 1960 American drama film directed by Joseph Cates and starring Anne Francis. It is based on the best-selling 1958 book The Call Girl by Harold Greenwald.

== Plot ==
A taxi driver picks up a woman running through the streets. Her name is Robin "Bobbie" Williams and, because she appears to be injured, she is taken to see a Dr. Mitchell in her apartment building, even though he is a psychologist.

Reluctantly, she reveals to Dr. Mitchell that she is a high-priced call girl. Bobbie agrees to a few sessions with the doctor and tells her story.

Her boyfriend, a man named Larry Taylor, was supposed to be protecting Bobbie on a job. Instead he sat in a bar, flirting with a young woman named Lisa, while an elderly john named Shelton repeatedly struck Bobbie with a cane.

Rowena Claiborne, who arranges "dates" for the prostitutes, persuades Lisa to join Bobbie on a night out with two wealthy clients. One of the men, Jason Franklin, claims to be offended when he discovers that these women are hookers. He intimidates Lisa, who recoils from him and falls through a window to her death.

Rather than sympathize, Larry is angry at Bobbie for costing them future earnings with Rowena. He physically assaults her. Bobbie is ashamed of her life and finds a job as a file clerk, hoping that no one in her office will discover the truth about her past.

== Cast ==
- Anne Francis as Bobbie
- Lloyd Nolan as Dr. Mitchell
- Kay Medford as Rowena Claiborne
- John Kerr as Larry Taylor
- Arthur Storch as Jason Franklin Jr.
- James Broderick as Dan Bolton
- Eileen Fulton as Lisa
- Julius Monk as Swagger
- Lauren Gilbert as Mr. Shelton
- Judy Tucker
- Noah Keen as Al
- René Enríquez as Ricardo
- Patricia Basch
- Jo Anna March as Lucy Worth
- Richard Bauman
- Louise Manning
