= Beauty and the Beast (1976 film) =

1976 American TV movie

- Based on: Beauty and the Beast by Jeanne-Marie Leprince de Beaumont
- Screenplay by: Sherman Yellen
- Directed by: Fielder Cook
- Starring: George C. Scott; Trish Van Devere; Virginia McKenna; Bernard Lee
- Music by: Ron Goodwin
- Country of origin: United States
- Original language: English

Production
- Cinematography: Paul Beeson; Jack Hildyard
- Editor: Frederick Wilson
- Running time: 74 minutes

Original release
- Release: December 3, 1976

Beauty and the Beast is a 1976 TV movie directed by Fielder Cook, written by Sherman Yellen and produced by Hallmark Hall of Fame Productions and Palm Films.

The movie is a live-action adaptation of Jeanne-Marie Leprince de Beaumont's eighteenth-century fairy-tale starring real-life husband and wife George C. Scott and Trish Van Devere.

== Cast ==
- George C. Scott as the Beast
- Trish Van Devere as Belle
- Virginia McKenna as Lucy
- Bernard Lee as Beaumont
- Michael Harbour as Anthony
- William Relton as Nicholas
- Patricia Quinn as Susan

== Reception ==
=== Accolades ===
Award	Date of ceremony	Category	Recipient(s)	Result	Ref.
Primetime Emmy Award	September 11, 1977	Outstanding Lead Actor in a Special Program - Drama or Comedy	George C. Scott	Nominated	
Primetime Emmy Award	September 11, 1977	Outstanding Achievement in Make-Up	Del Acevedo, John Chambers and Daniel C. Striepeke	Nominated	
Primetime Emmy Award	September 11, 1977	Outstanding Achievement in Costume Design for a Drama Special	Albert Wolsky	Nominated	
