= Izzy Lang =

American football player (1942–2008)

No. 29, 39
- Position: Running back

Personal information
- Born: February 2, 1942; Tampa, Florida, U.S.
- Died: October 10, 2008 (aged 66); Sunset Park, Brooklyn, New York, U.S.
- Listed height: 6 ft 1 in (1.85 m)
- Listed weight: 232 lb (105 kg)

Career information
- High school: George S. Middleton (Tampa)
- College: Tennessee State (1960-1963)
- NFL draft: 1964: 18th round, 240th overall pick

Career history
- Philadelphia Eagles (1964–1968); Los Angeles Rams (1969)

Career NFL statistics
- Rushing yards: 873
- Rushing average: 3.6
- Receptions: 63
- Receiving yards: 554
- Total touchdowns: 8
- Stats at Pro Football Reference

Israel Alvin "Izzy" Lang (February 2, 1942 - October 10, 2008) was an American professional football player who was a running back for six seasons in the National Football League (NFL). He was selected by the Philadelphia Eagles in the 18th round of the 1964 NFL draft. He played for the Eagles from 1964–1968, and the Los Angeles Rams in 1969. He played college football for the Tennessee State Tigers.

== Professional career ==
=== Philadelphia Eagles ===
Lang was selected by the Philadelphia Eagles in the 18th round (240th overall) of the 1964 NFL draft. He was mainly a backup during his first two seasons in the NFL, and he earned the starting running back job in 1966 NFL season. In the season-opener against the St. Louis Cardinals, Lang rushed for 65 yards on 16 carries. In week 2, he rushed for 114 yards on 16 attempts. Lang was named Most Valuable Player of the 1966 Playoff Bowl, even though he did not start in the game. The Eagles lost the game to the Baltimore Colts, 20–14.

In 1968, Lang rushed for 235 yards on 35 carries. After the season, he asked to be traded from the team.

=== Los Angeles Rams ===
On July 7, 1969, Lang was traded to the Los Angeles Rams in exchange for defensive end John Zook and wide receiver Harold Jackson. He retired after the season.

== After football ==
Lang made an appearance in the 1970 film Where's Poppa? as Muthafucka.

Lang was arrested 24 times after his retirement. On November 15, 1988, he was arrested for impersonating then-New York Giants running back Joe Morris by forging checks. He had convinced United Jersey Bank to cash a check in Morris' name. He had also impersonated Lawrence Taylor, Leonard Marshall and Doug Williams. He is buried at Hart Island (Bronx).
