= The Call Girl =

1958 book by Harold Greenwald

- Author: Harold Greenwald
- Publisher: Ballantine Books
- Publication date: 1958

The Call Girl is a best seller of 1958 written by the doctor Harold Greenwald, a psychotherapist whose doctoral dissertation is about the psychology of prostitutes. In 1960, he made a Hollywood movie on the same topic, Girl of the Night.

In 1970, a new edition of the book was published, titled The Elegant Prostitute.
