= Where's Poppa? =

1970 film by Carl Reiner

- Theatrical release poster
- Directed by: Carl Reiner
- Written by: Robert Klane (novel & screenplay)
- Produced by: Jerry Tokofsky; Marvin Worth
- Starring: George Segal; Ruth Gordon; Ron Leibman; Trish Van Devere
- Cinematography: Jack Priestley
- Edited by: Chic Ciccolini; Bud Molin
- Music by: Jack Elliott
- Distributed by: United Artists
- Release date: November 10, 1970 (United States)
- Running time: 82 minutes
- Country: United States
- Language: English
- Budget: $1 million

Where's Poppa? is a 1970 American black comedy film based on the 1970 novel by Robert Klane and starring George Segal, Ruth Gordon, Ron Leibman, and Trish Van Devere. The plot revolves around the troubled relationship between a lawyer (Segal) and his senile mother (Gordon), who keeps interfering with his love life. The film was directed by Carl Reiner, whose son Rob Reiner had a role in an early performance. Others in the cast include Paul Sorvino (in his film debut), Rae Allen, Vincent Gardenia and Garrett Morris. The film was re-released in 1975, under the title Going Ape, and maintains a cult following.

== Plot ==
Gordon Hocheiser has had some success as a lawyer working as a criminal defense attorney in New York City. However, he still cares for and lives with his mother, a rude, possibly senile 87-year-old widow, who is ruining her son's love life. He resents her so much that he tries to scare her to death by donning a gorilla suit and attacking her in bed, only to end up being hit hard in the groin by her. Nevertheless, she seems unaware of his intentions and refers to him as a "good boy." Despite his deep resentment for his mother and his desire to be rid of her, Gordon had made a deathbed promise to his father not to place her in a rest home, which causes him severe anguish. She continuously asks, "Where's Poppa?" His repeated response is, "Still dead."

He is desperate to hire a nurse for help but, since his mother has already had conflicts with many of them, no one will agree to take the job. Gordon finally locates Louise, a young and beautiful nurse whose patients have a peculiar habit of dying in her care. Instantly smitten with her, he hires Louise to be his mother's companion, despite her notable lack of any qualifications. Thrilled about his budding love, he immediately becomes frightened that his mother will sabotage it and, when he invites Louise over to his apartment on the Upper West Side, he tries to lock his mother away in her room.

After a disastrous first meeting between Louise and his mother, a frustrated Gordon calls his brother Sidney and threatens to kill his mother if he doesn't immediately take her off his hands. Worried that Gordon will actually carry through with his threats, Sidney, who lives with his family on the Upper East Side, ignores the protests of his wife and runs in the middle of the night across Central Park, where he has a history of repeatedly being mugged. As expected, his muggers again confront him and steal his clothes.

When a naked Sidney arrives at Gordon's apartment, Louise has already left so, after agreeing to help the next time he needs him, Sidney borrows the gorilla costume and wears it home. Soon after, Louise returns and, realizing that this may be his last chance with her, Gordon calls Sidney's apartment to come back to help. On his way back across the park, however, a gorilla-suit wearing Sidney runs again into his muggers and they force him to rape a woman in the park, who turns out to be an undercover male police officer. Back at his apartment, Gordon's mother humiliates him in front of Louise at dinner, pulling down his pants and biting his buttocks. This causes Louise to flee in a cab, leaving Gordon on the street with his pants still around his ankles.

A despondent Gordon visits Sidney in jail, who explains that "the bad part" of the assault was that it was an undercover officer, but that he hadn't noticed because he was "terribly excited". However, to both of their surprise, Sidney gets off free after the raped officer sends Sidney flowers and a card saying "Thank you for a wonderful evening" and asking for his telephone number. The next day, Gordon returns to work, but, tired and unfocused, he represents a client in court with utter incompetence. During this trial, Louise appears at the back of the courtroom and Gordon leaves abruptly to meet her. At the end of his rope, with Louise unable to stand his mother one minute more and threatening to leave Gordon, he returns to his apartment, picks up his mother, packs her luggage, and tells her that they're going to meet Poppa. Gordon drives with his mother and Louise to a rest home which takes terrible care of their residents but which currently has no room. After eventually finding another one that will take his mother, Gordon drops her off at the entrance and presents a random elderly stranger as Poppa. Finally free of his mother, Gordon and Louise then drive away joyously.

== Cast ==
- George Segal as Gordon Hocheiser
- Ruth Gordon as Mrs. Hocheiser
- Ron Leibman as Sidney Hocheiser
- Barnard Hughes as Colonel Hendricks
- Vincent Gardenia as Coach Williams
- Trish Van Devere as Louise Callan
- Rae Allen as Gladys Hocheiser
- Rob Reiner as Roger
- Penny Marshall as courtroom spectator
- Paul Sorvino as Owner of "Gus & Grace's Home"
- William Le Massena as Judge
- Michael McGuire as Army Lawyer
- Martha Greenhouse as Owner of "Happytime Farms"
- Israel Lang as Muthafucka
- Garrett Morris as Garrett
- Arnold Williams as Arnold
- Buddy Butler as Buddy
- Joe Keyes Jr. as the gang leader

== Production ==
Filming took place in New York, including Brooklyn. Other filming locations included sound stages on the West Side, streets in Manhattan, Central Park, and several sites in Long Island. Filming was concluded as of June 1970, after seven weeks of filming in and around New York. Director Carl Reiner's son Rob Reiner had an early role in the film.

=== Alternate ending ===
The film's original ending, featuring Gordon in bed with his mother, was considered too risqué and was removed before the theatrical release. In a post-credits scene removed from the movie but still seen in cable prints and featured on several home video releases, Gordon's ruse to keep his mother at the rest home has failed. She calls him at his apartment and, sensing that this will continue, Louise follows through on her threat to leave him. With the phone still in his hand, Gordon drives up to the rest home and, upon arriving, appears likely to murder his mother. However, resigned to the belief he will never be rid of her, he instead dejectedly climbs into bed with his mother, saying, "Here's Poppa."

== Release ==
Where's Poppa? was released in the United States on November 10, 1970, by United Artists. Though it did not do well upon first release, it subsequently gained a following, prompting United Artists to re-release it nationally in 1975 under the title Going Ape. United Artists chose the title because the film involved various gorilla-related shenanigans. Where's Poppa? was released on DVD in 2002, and on Blu-ray in 2016.

In regards to the VHS releases of Where's Poppa?, the Key Video release was the theatrical version, which had its original ending changed to a more 'sedate' finish. The later MGM/UA Home Video release had the original ending restored where Gordon Hocheiser ends up in the bed with his mother. Thus, viewers have their choice of which version they prefer to watch.

== Reception ==
Roger Greenspun of The New York Times wrote that if the film "doesn't succeed all the time, or even most of the time, it succeeds often enough, if only by energy and will, to satisfy a taste for comedy that has not had much nourishment this season." Roger Ebert rated the film three stars out of four and recommended it to those "who want to laugh and like being offended." Gene Siskel of the Chicago Tribune gave the film two-and-a-half stars out of four and wrote that Klane "has written his screenplay as tho he thought it would be his last (a position which can be self-enforcing). He's crammed the short story (only 83 minutes) with comments on the Army, little-league baseball and Central Park. He should have stayed with his major story premise which is wickedly funny." Variety wrote that "Many ... will be offended by this black comedy," but "Many others will feel it only hurts when you laugh, and that director Carl Reiner, with a maniac zeal, has pulled off one of the most outrageous and funniest comedies this year." Charles Champlin of the Los Angeles Times called the film "irreverent, foul-mouthed, vulgar, tasteless, indecent and—for reasons I'm not sure I fully understand—riotously funny." Gary Arnold of The Washington Post wrote that George Segal was "in really brilliant form" but the film's mix of "self-consciously outrageous" scenes and charming scenes "don't blend, and often the tendency of one style warps or undermines the tendency of another." Tom Milne of The Monthly Film Bulletin wrote, "Flawlessly scripted, acted and directed, and hovering somewhere between Lord Love a Duck and Little Murders in its delightfully eccentric humour, Where's Poppa? is one of the nicest black comedies in years, as well as the funniest."

== Award nominations ==
Year	Award	Result	Category	Recipient
1971	Laurel Awards	Nominated	Star of Tomorrow, Female	Trish Van Devere
1971	Writers Guild of America Award	Nominated	Best Comedy Adapted from Another Medium	Robert Klane

== Television pilot ==
In 1979, a half-hour television pilot was aired on ABC for a proposed series titled Where's Poppa?, starring Steven Keats (Gordon), Elsa Lanchester (Momma), and Allan Miller (Sidney). The series wasn't picked up.

== See also ==
- List of American films of 1970
