= Frederic Morton =

American novelist (1924–2016)

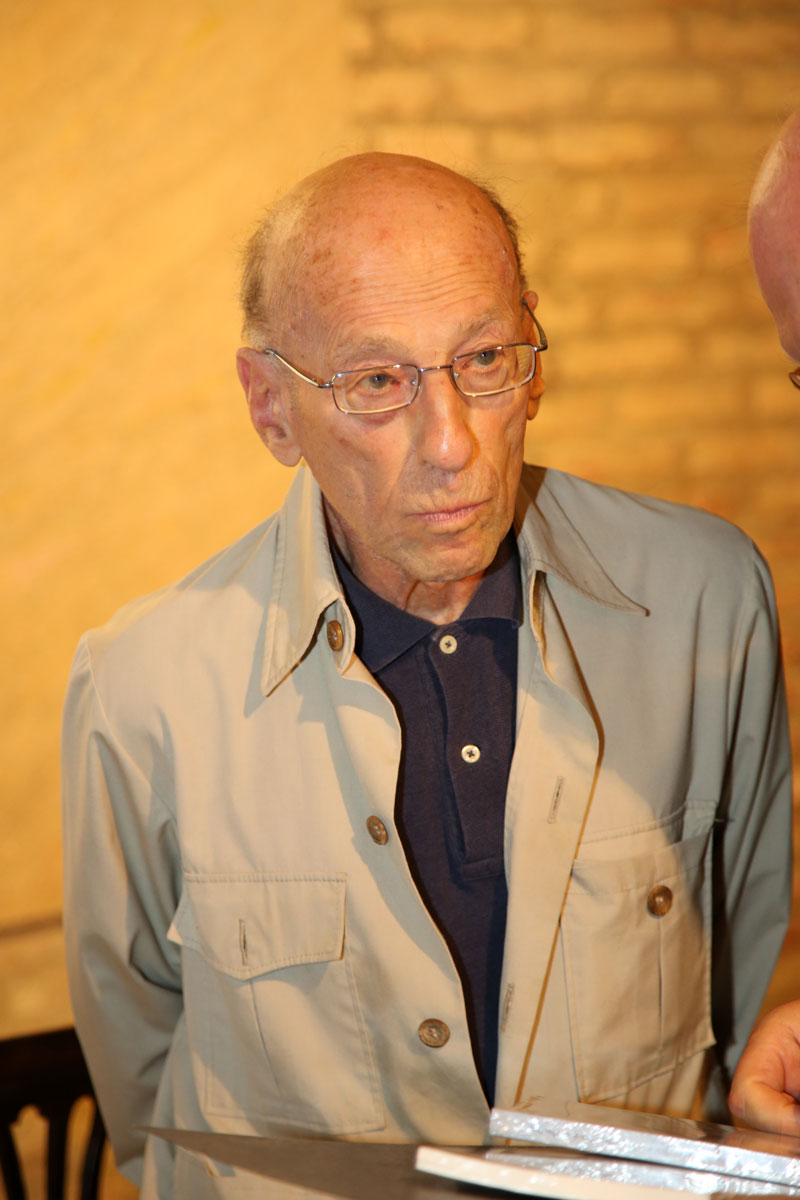
Morton in 2013

Frederic Morton (October 5, 1924 – April 20, 2015) was an Austrian-born American writer.

== Life ==
Born Fritz Mandelbaum in Vienna, Morton was the son of a blacksmith who specialized in forging (manufacturing) imperial medals. In the wake of the Anschluss of 1938, his father was arrested, but later released from Dachau concentration camp. The family fled to Britain in 1939 and migrated to New York City the next year, when the senior Mandelbaum also changed the family name in order to be able to join an anti-Semitic labor union.

Morton worked as a baker but began studying literature in 1949. He would visit Austria several times from 1951 until his death in 2015. His 1962 visit was to marry his fiancée, Marcia, whom he had met at college.

From 1959, Morton worked as a columnist for several American periodicals including The New York Times, Esquire, and Playboy. He died at the Hilton hotel in Vienna at the age of 90 on April 20, 2015, while visiting, returning twice a year in his later years.

== Selected works ==
- The Hound (Dodd, Mead, 1947) Intercollegiate Literary Fellowship Prize Novels
- Asphalt and Desire (Harcourt Brace, 1952) novel
- The Witching Ship (Random House, 1960) novel
- The Rothschilds: A Family Portrait (Atheneum Books, 1962) LCCN 62-7938; edition with new epilogue and afterword, The Rothschilds: Portrait of a Dynasty (New York: Kodansha International, 1998) ( ISBN 1-56836-220-X ), LCCN 98-14815
- The Schatten Affair (Atheneum, 1965) novel
- Snow Gods (New American Library, 1968) novel
- An Unknown Woman (Little Brown, 1976) novel
- A Nervous Splendor: Vienna, 1888–1889 (Little Brown, 1979) (ISBN 0-14-005667-X ) reprinted by the Folio Society 2006
- The Forever Street (Doubleday, 1984) ( ISBN 0-7432-5220-9 ) novel
- Chocolate: An Illustrated History (Random House, 1986) ( ISBN 978-0-517-55765-5 ) written with his wife Marcia
- Crosstown Sabbath: A Street Journey Through History (Grove Press, 1987) ( ISBN 978-0-394-56070-0 )
- Thunder at Twilight: Vienna 1913-1914 (Scribner's, 1989) (ISBN 0-306-81021-2 )
- Runaway Waltz (Simon & Schuster, 2005) ( ISBN 0-7432-2539-2 ) memoir

== Decorations and awards ==
- 1963: Author of the Year (Anti-Defamation League)
- 1980: Title of "Professor"
- 2001: Gold Medal of Vienna
- 2003: Austrian Cross of Honour for Science and Art, 1st class

== See also ==
- List of Austrian writers
