= Edith Lederer =

American journalist (born 1943)

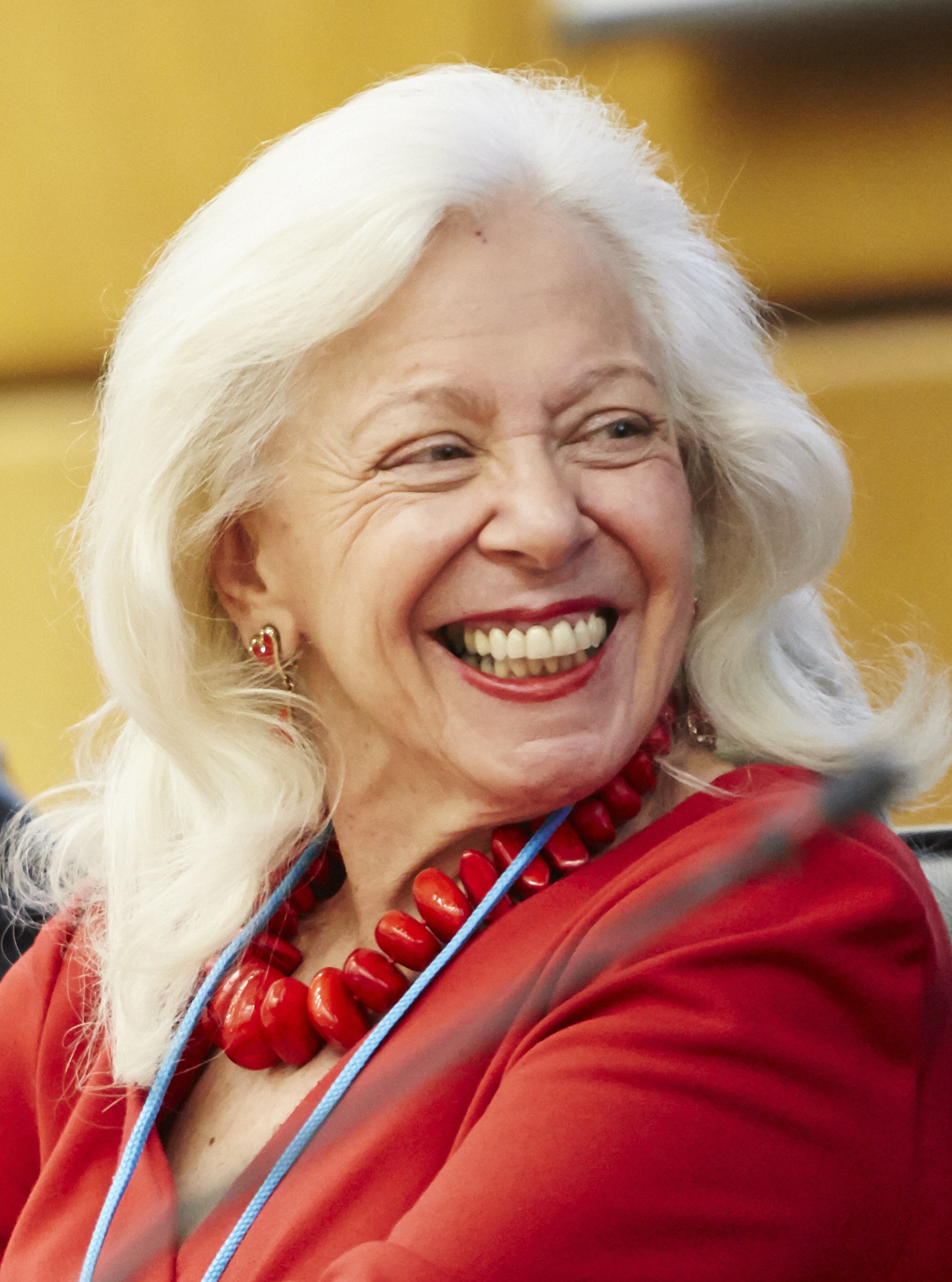
- Lederer in 2016
- Born: 1943 (age 82–83)
- Other name: Edie Lederer
- Education: Cornell University (BS); Stanford University (MA)
- Occupation: Journalist

Edith Lederer, also known as Edie Lederer (born 1943) is an American war journalist.

== Early life and education ==
Lederer grew up in Long Island. In 1963, Lederer received a Bachelor of Science degree from Cornell University and Master of Arts in communications from Stanford University.

== Career ==
Lederer worked with Jean Heller at the Associated Press (AP) New York City headquarters at 50 Rockefeller Plaza. In 1968, while working at the AP's San Francisco bureau, Lederer met Peter Buxtun and he spoke to her about his ethical concerns regarding the Tuskegee Syphilis Study. Lederer recognized the newsworthiness of the information and passed it on to a colleague, Associated Press investigative reporter Jean Heller, who broke the story, resulting in the ending of the study.

Lederer was the first female resident correspondent in Vietnam in 1971 and the first woman to head a foreign bureau for the AP, in Lima, Peru in 1975. She worked for the AP for five decades, becoming the chief correspondent at the United Nations. She was named Sigma Delta Tau's Outstanding Alumna in 2017. She won four lifetime achievement awards from the Overseas Press Club, the International Women's Media Foundation, the Washington Press Club Foundation and the Newswomen's Club of New York. She co-authored "War Torn: Stories of War from the Women Who Covered Vietnam."
