= Miss Evers' Boys =

1997 made-for-television historical drama by HBO

- DVD cover
- Genre: Historical drama
- Based on: Miss Evers' Boys by David Feldshuh
- Written by: Walter Bernstein
- Directed by: Joseph Sargent
- Starring: Alfre Woodard; Laurence Fishburne; Craig Sheffer; Joe Morton; Obba Babatundé; E.G. Marshall; Ossie Davis
- Music by: Charles Bernstein
- Country of origin: United States
- Original language: English

Production
- Executive producers: Robert Benedetti; Laurence Fishburne
- Producers: Derek Kavanagh; Kip Konwiser
- Production locations: Porterdale, Georgia, U.S.; Atlanta, Georgia, U.S.; Covington, Georgia, U.S.
- Cinematography: Donald M. Morgan
- Editor: Michael Brown
- Camera setup: Single-camera
- Running time: 118 minutes
- Production companies: Anasazi Productions; HBO NYC Productions

Original release
- Network: HBO
- Release: February 22, 1997

Miss Evers' Boys is an American made-for-television drama starring Alfre Woodard and Laurence Fishburne that first aired on February 22, 1997, and is based on the true story of the four-decade-long Tuskegee Syphilis Study. The main character Nurse Eunice Evers is based on Eunice Rivers Laurie. It was directed by Joseph Sargent and adapted by Walter Bernstein from the 1992 stage play of the same name, written by David Feldshuh. It received twelve nominations at the 1997 Primetime Emmy Awards, ultimately winning five, including Outstanding Television Movie and the President's Award (awarded for programming that best explores social or educational issues).

== Plot ==
The film tells the story of a medical study with covert goals organized by the U.S. Department of Health and Human Services, conducted on poor African American men in the years 1932–1972 at Tuskegee University, designed to study the effects of untreated syphilis. The story is told from the perspective of the small town nurse Eunice Evers who is well aware of the lack of treatment, but feels her role is to console the involved men, many of whom are her close friends.

In 1932 she is sent to help Dr. Sam Brodus and Dr. Douglas to help them "treat" rural black men in the town of Tuskegee, Alabama. She is sent around town to tell the people that the government is funding their treatment for free, but unbeknownst to them the government will soon run a study that requires them to go without any form of real treatment. She then comes across three men in an abandoned schoolhouse: Willie Johnson, Hodman Bryan and "Big" Ben Washington, who agree for treatment.

The study selected 412 men infected with the disease and promised them free medical treatment for what was called "bad blood". The movie shows Miss Evers suggesting the term as a strategy to withhold information about syphilis from the men. The men received fake long-term treatment, which involved giving them mercury and placebos even after penicillin was discovered as a cure.

When Caleb Humphries (one of the test subjects who left the experiment) joins the Army during World War II and is treated and cured by penicillin, he returns to tell how he was cured and tries to get help for his friend. But none of the hospitals would help because the test subjects were placed on a list that stated they should not receive medical treatment because they were participants in the experiment. The survivors of the study did receive treatment and financial compensation after the US Senate investigated in the 1970s, and eventually a formal apology from President Bill Clinton.

== Cast ==
- Alfre Woodard as Nurse Eunice Evers
- Laurence Fishburne as Caleb Humphries
- Craig Sheffer as Dr. Douglas
- Joe Morton as Dr. Sam Brodus
- Obba Babatundé as Willie Johnson
- Thom Gossom Jr. as Big Ben Washington
- Ossie Davis as Mr. Evers
- E.G. Marshall as Senate Chairman
- Robert Benedetti as Senator
- Peter Stelzer as Senator
- Donzaleigh Abernathy as Nurse Betty
- Kiki Shepard as Sadie

== Awards and nominations ==
Accolades
Event Organizer (Date)	Award	Recipient	Outcome
19^{th} CableACE Awards The Internet & Television Association (November 14, 1997)	Best Movie	Robert Benedetti, Laurence Fishburne, Derek Kavanaugh, Kip Konwiser, Kern Konwiser & Peter Stelzer	Won
19^{th} CableACE Awards The Internet & Television Association (November 14, 1997)	Best Actress in a Movie or Miniseries	Alfre Woodard	Won
19^{th} CableACE Awards The Internet & Television Association (November 14, 1997)	Best Supporting Actor in a Movie or Miniseries	Obba Babatundé	Nominated
19^{th} CableACE Awards The Internet & Television Association (November 14, 1997)	Best Costume Design	Susan Mickey	Nominated
34^{th} Cinema Audio Society Awards Cinema Audio Society	Outstanding Achievement in Sound Mixing for Television – Movie of the Week, Mini-Series or Specials	Shirley Libby, Robert W. Glass, Jr., Scott Ganary & Jim Fitzpatrick	Nominated
50^{th} Directors Guild of America Awards Directors Guild of America (March 7, 1998)	Outstanding Directorial Achievement in Movies for Television and Mini-Series	Joseph Sargent	Nominated
37^{th} Eddie Awards American Cinema Editors (March 14, 1998)	Best Edited Two-Hour Movie for Non-Commercial Television	Michael Brown	Nominated
55^{th} Golden Globe Awards Hollywood Foreign Press Association (January 18, 1998)	Best Television Motion Picture		Nominated
55^{th} Golden Globe Awards Hollywood Foreign Press Association (January 18, 1998)	Best Actress – Miniseries or Television Film	Alfre Woodard	Won
9^{th} Golden Laurel Awards Producers Guild of America (March 3, 1998)	David L. Wolper Award for Outstanding Producer of Long-Form Television	Robert Benedetti, Laurence Fishburne, Derek Kavanaugh, Kip Konwiser, Kern Konwiser & Peter Stelzer	Won
2^{nd} Golden Satellite Awards International Press Academy (February 22, 1998)	Best Miniseries or Motion Picture Made for Television		Nominated
2^{nd} Golden Satellite Awards International Press Academy (February 22, 1998)	Best Actress in a Miniseries or Motion Picture Made for Television	Alfre Woodard	Co-Winner (tie with Jennifer Beals in The Twilight of the Golds)
2^{nd} Golden Satellite Awards International Press Academy (February 22, 1998)	Best Actor in a Supporting Role in a Miniseries or a Motion Picture Made for Television	Ossie Davis	Nominated
24^{th} Humanitas Prizes Human Family Educational & Cultural Institute (July 10, 1998)	90 Minute or Longer PBS/Cable Television	Walter Bernstein	Won
19^{th} International Monitor Awards Association of Imaging Technology and Sound	Film Originated Television Specials – Color Correction	Allan Rogers	Won
29^{th} NAACP Image Awards NAACP (February 14, 1998)	Outstanding Made for Television Movie		Won
1^{st} Online Film & Television Association Awards Online Film & Television Association	Best Actress in a Television Motion Picture or Miniseries	Alfre Woodard	Nominated
49^{th} Primetime Creative Arts Emmy Awards Academy of Television Arts & Sciences (September 7, 1997)	Outstanding Single-Camera Picture Editing for a Miniseries or a Special	Michael Brown	Won
49^{th} Primetime Creative Arts Emmy Awards Academy of Television Arts & Sciences (September 7, 1997)	Outstanding Cinematography for a Miniseries or a Special	Donald M. Morgan	Won
49^{th} Primetime Creative Arts Emmy Awards Academy of Television Arts & Sciences (September 7, 1997)	Outstanding Choreography	Dianne McIntyre	Nominated
49^{th} Primetime Creative Arts Emmy Awards Academy of Television Arts & Sciences (September 7, 1997)	Outstanding Casting for a Miniseries or a Special	Shay Bentley-Griffin, Jaki Brown-Karman & Robyn M. Mitchell	Nominated
49^{th} Primetime Creative Arts Emmy Awards Academy of Television Arts & Sciences (September 7, 1997)	Outstanding Makeup for a Miniseries or a Special	Matthew W. Mungle & Wynona Y. Price	Nominated
49^{th} Primetime Creative Arts Emmy Awards Academy of Television Arts & Sciences (September 7, 1997)	Outstanding Writing for a Miniseries or a Special	Walter Bernstein	Nominated
49^{th} Primetime Emmy Awards Academy of Television Arts & Sciences (September 14, 1997)	Outstanding Made for Television Movie	Robert Benedetti, Laurence Fishburne, Derek Kavanaugh, Kip Konwiser, Kern Konwiser & Peter Stelzer	Won
49^{th} Primetime Emmy Awards Academy of Television Arts & Sciences (September 14, 1997)	Outstanding Lead Actress in a Miniseries or Special	Alfre Woodard	Won
49^{th} Primetime Emmy Awards Academy of Television Arts & Sciences (September 14, 1997)	The President's Award	HBO & Anasazi Productions	Won
49^{th} Primetime Emmy Awards Academy of Television Arts & Sciences (September 14, 1997)	Outstanding Lead Actor in a Miniseries or Special	Laurence Fishburne	Nominated
49^{th} Primetime Emmy Awards Academy of Television Arts & Sciences (September 14, 1997)	Outstanding Supporting Actor in a Miniseries or a Special	Obba Babatundé	Nominated
49^{th} Primetime Emmy Awards Academy of Television Arts & Sciences (September 14, 1997)	Outstanding Supporting Actor in a Miniseries or a Special	Ossie Davis	Nominated
41^{st} San Francisco International Film Festival San Francisco Film Society (May 7, 1998)	Silver Spire Award	Joseph Sargent	Won
4^{th} Screen Actors Guild Awards Screen Actors Guild (March 8, 1998)	Outstanding Performance by a Female Actor in a Television Movie or Miniseries	Alfre Woodard	Won
