= Jean Heller =

American writer and investigative journalist

Jean Heller is an American writer and former investigative journalist. She is best known for publishing the news of the Tuskegee syphilis study in 1972, and reporting on the inaccuracies of claims by the United States of an Iraqi buildup on the Saudi Arabian border during the Gulf War in 1990. She has reported for the St. Petersburg Times, Newsday and the Associated Press.

== Education ==
Jean Heller graduated from the Ohio State University School of Journalism in 1964.

== Career ==
In 1972, Associated Press colleague Edith Lederer provided Heller with evidence she had received from whistleblower Peter Buxtun detailing that, for four decades, people enrolled in the Tuskegee study had been deliberately denied treatment for syphilis. Years later, Heller called the story "one of the grossest violations of human rights I can imagine". Her article exposing the unethical study was published in the Washington Star on July 25, 1972, and it became front-page news in the New York Times the following day. The exposé earned Heller the Robert F. Kennedy Journalism Award, the Raymond Clapper Memorial Award, and the George Polk Award.

Heller also writes the Deuce Mora series of novels, which feature a fictional Chicago newspaper columnist.

== Personal life ==
Heller lives in Southport, North Carolina. She is a pilot, which led her to publish two books about fictional aviation disasters.
