= Bill Jenkins (epidemiologist) =

American public health researcher (1945–2019)

- Born: William Carter Jenkins; July 26, 1945; Mount Pleasant, South Carolina
- Died: February 17, 2019 (aged 73); Charleston, South Carolina
- Education: Morehouse College, Georgetown University, University of North Carolina at Chapel Hill
- Scientific career
- Fields: Epidemiology, public health, statistics

William Carter Jenkins (July 26, 1945 – February 17, 2019) was an American public health researcher and academic.

Jenkins worked as a statistician at the United States Public Health Service in the 1960s, and is best known for trying to halt the Tuskegee syphilis experiment in 1968. He spent the rest of his career fighting racism in the U.S. healthcare system, working for the Centers for Disease Control and Prevention (CDC) during the early days of the AIDS crisis, and overseeing the government benefits program for survivors of the Tuskegee Syphilis Study.

== Life and career ==
Jenkins graduated from historically black Morehouse College with a degree in mathematics in 1967, and he earned a master's in biostatistics from Georgetown University in 1974, a master's in public health from the university of North Carolina at Chapel Hill (UNC) in 1977, and a PhD in epidemiology from UNC in 1983.

Jenkins helped to create a newsletter called The Drum with the purpose of addressing discrimination in health care. It was in this newspaper that Jenkins first wrote about his concerns regarding the Tuskegee Syphilis Experiments before contacting larger news corporations. Jenkins' continued to expose the Tuskegee Syphilis study with his 2002 production of "Voices of the Tuskegee Study", a documentary featuring some survivors of the study and their stories of the study's lasting effects. Jenkins' advocacy work concerning the lives of participants did not end with his attempts to expose the study or his aid in running the benefits program for survivors. He also served on the Tuskegee Syphilis Study Legacy Committee and in doing so called for an apology from the United States government. He was present in 1997 as President Bill Clinton extended that apology, admitting the wrongdoings of the government and their involvement in the study.

He was one of the first cadre of African Americans recruited to the United States Public Health Service Commissioned Corps in the 1960s. In 1980 he joined the Division of Sexually Transmitted Diseases at the CDC, where he was a Supervisory Epidemiologist and manager of the Tuskegee Health Benefit Program.

He later taught in the Epidemiology department at the University of North Carolina at Chapel Hill, and at Morehouse College in Atlanta, Georgia. He served as co-director of the UNC Minority Health Project and helped to create the yearly conference associated with this project.

== Recognition ==
Jenkins received the Hildrus Augustus Poindexter Award from the National Black Caucus of Health Workers of the American Public Health Association.
