= Baltimore Lead Paint Study =

Clinical study

The Baltimore Lead Paint Study was a controversial clinical study conducted by the Johns Hopkins Kennedy Krieger Institute (KKI) in poor Baltimorean neighborhoods during the 1990s. Families with young children were deliberately exposed to lead by being housed with their families in apartments where lead paint had not been completely removed. Researchers hoped to show that less stringent lead abatement techniques that would cost landlords less money would pose minimal health risks to children. The study was criticised for targeting poor African American children, for exposing children to a known health risk and for inadequate participant consent. The backlash culminated in class action lawsuits against KKI by Ericka Grimes and Myron Higgins, two of the subjects representing on the order of a hundred affected children without adequate care.

== Background ==
Despite knowledge of lead's toxicity, there is a long history of using lead in paint due to its role in maintaining a paint's color and increasing durability. In 1951, Baltimore was the first city to ban the use of lead paint in new housing, starting a move towards abating the amount of lead use in homes. Twenty-seven years later, in 1978 the Consumer Product Safety Commission laid down a nationwide ban of lead-based paint for residential use in the United States.

The Kennedy Krieger Institute is a branch of Johns Hopkins that provides medical care, rehabilitation, and research, especially emphasizing research geared towards children with learning and physical disabilities arising from neurodegenerative disorders. Lead's effects on the nervous system manifests into reduced cognitive ability, especially in children. Once lead paint was made illegal, many properties that were painted with lead still remained, especially in Baltimore, eventually leaving the painted walls that were not properly remodeled to decay and thus allow lead to be released as chips or dust, increasing risk of ingestion for future renovators and inhabitants. Thus it became of interest to study how residential properties with lead could be removed, and inevitably how to abate lead without incurring high expenses for removal.

The study was funded by the United States Environmental Protection Agency and the United States Department of Housing and Urban Development.

== Study description ==
To investigate how well various techniques in abating lead content reduced the prevalence of lead poisoning in low income neighborhoods, KKI sought to treat properties with these different methods and observe how much lead accumulated in young children when living in these properties. In total, several housing properties were categorized into five levels of abatement. Starting in 1993, KKI helped landlords abate apartments partially or with less expensive techniques graded by these levels. In total, 107 properties were categorized into five groups by degree of repair made to the property. KKI also actively found new families to live in these apartments, bringing the total number of children evaluated to 140, and even offered incentives for doing so. To quantify the effectiveness of each level of abatement, the researchers measured lead content of homes and took periodic blood tests over a two-year period. If the repairs were effective, the lead concentration in properties with higher degrees of abatement or built without lead would be less than properties with less repair and the lead content in young children would not increase as much or at all. Follow up measurements were to be made every couple of years after to track how the lead concentration changed in children.

== Aftermath ==
After the study ended, many poor, African-American children ended up with neurological disabilities as a result, often incurring permanent nervous damage. In addition to having to cope with the impacted health of their children, parents also felt deceived by KKI team by being shown housing without full details behind the lead treatment quality of the properties they stayed in. Thus, criticism was made that both the children and parents were exploited by the study. Comparisons were made to the infamous Tuskegee Syphilis Study due to the similar affected demographic groups, in terms of race and class, lack of clear and explicit consent to participate in each study, lack of adequate care provided during each study, and the long-term, devastating impact of the study's condition on the subject's quality of life. Parallels between arguments on the implications and benefits of the research for each study followed suit, strengthening the idea that among other social and economic fronts, minorities also faced discrimination in the context of medicine.

KKI saw extensive repercussions over the study. A class action lawsuit for deliberate exposure and negligence was filed against KKI in 2001. The Johns Hopkins Internal Review Board was criticized for allowing the study to proceed in spite of federal regulations on using children as patients in studies. The defense argued that the study did not actually put the subjects at risk since the administrators of study only reduced lead content and collected blood rather than explicitly inducing lead poisoning in children and that the parents ultimately still had the choice to live elsewhere.

The study supposedly had some merit, mainly regarding the takeaways that could be made based on the results. The results brought the benefit of understanding that lead paint quality/condition was more harmful than concentration of lead in paint due to increased likelihood of ingesting paint or dust from decaying paint. The growing criticism raised the concern that if zero risk was required in public health research then many problems could not be rigorously addressed, leaving the public collectively at risk. It was argued by the defense that the target population itself would still have a higher chance of exposure to lead poisoning regardless whether the study was implemented or not. Therefore, any of the techniques that proved effective and low cost would benefit more of the population in the long run. Thus, risk exposure guidelines could be revised as a sort of compromise. The idea of minimal risk to the patient was revisited and questioned to what extent a study's procedure incurred risk, leading to changes in guidelines on how studies are conducted such as the degree of parental knowledge of study and more attention on current guidelines to avoid oversight of what minimal risk is acceptable.

== See also ==
- Lead abatement in the United States
