= John A. Andrew Memorial Hospital =

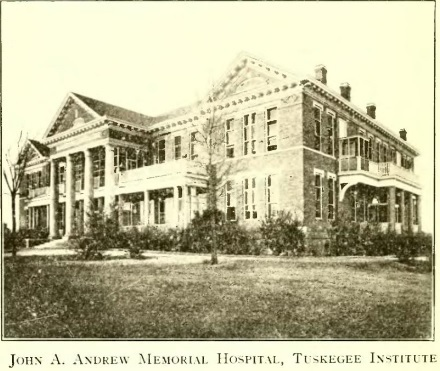

Geography
- Location: Tuskegee, Alabama, United States
- Coordinates: 32.4337504°N 85.7049532°W

Organization
- Type: Teaching

Services
- Beds: 180

History
- Founded: 1892
- Closed: 1987

Links
- Lists: Hospitals in Alabama

The John A. Andrew Memorial Hospital was a teaching hospital on the campus of the Tuskegee Institute in Tuskegee, Alabama, open from 1892 to 1987. It was named for abolitionist Massachusetts Governor John A. Andrew (1818–1867), a main force in the creation of negro troops in the U.S.

== History ==
The John A. Andrew Memorial Hospital was originally established in 1892 as the Tuskegee Institute Hospital and Nurse Training School. Its original purpose was to train nursing students and provide care for faculty members at the Tuskegee Institute. When it was founded, it was the first black hospital in Alabama. When it was founded, it did not have an outpatient clinic, and instead only provided emergency services within its Tuskegee building. Unlike most other American hospitals of the day, it practiced outreach to surrounding communities through decentralized clinics in rural areas, and most patients received care at these clinics rather than at the hospital itself. In 1902, John A. Kenney Sr. was appointed its director, after which the hospital increased in size and expanded its reach to the entire surrounding community.

After being given to the Tuskegee Institute in 1911, it was dedicated on February 21, 1913, as a result of which it was renamed. It was rebuilt using money donated by the wife of Charles E. Mason, a trustee of the Tuskegee Institute. It was named after Mrs. Mason's grandfather, former Massachusetts governor John Albion Andrew. In a 1919 article in the Nation's Health, Kinney described the hospital as "a modern, up-to-date, well-appointed, two-story brick building, with accommodations for sixty patients with no crowding, and for a good many more when it is necessary." The Tuskegee Syphilis Study took place at the hospital, thanks to the approval of both Eugene Dibble (then the hospital's medical director) and Robert R. Moton (then the president of the Tuskegee Institute).

The hospital closed in 1987, after its resources were exhausted by an excess of charity cases. When it closed, it was the last black hospital in Alabama. It was later reopened as the National Center for Bioethics in Research and Healthcare in January 1999.

== Influence ==
During the pre-civil rights era, John A. Andrew Memorial Hospital served as a center for black physicians in the Deep South to receive postgraduate training, and for black patients to receive care. According to Montague Cobb, it was one of only five first-rate hospitals in the pre-1940s South that treated black patients. Because so few other nearby hospitals would accept black patients, it "became the medical center for Alabama blacks", as a 1995 Baltimore Sun article noted.
