= Vanessa Northington Gamble =

American physician (born 1953)

Vanessa Gamble
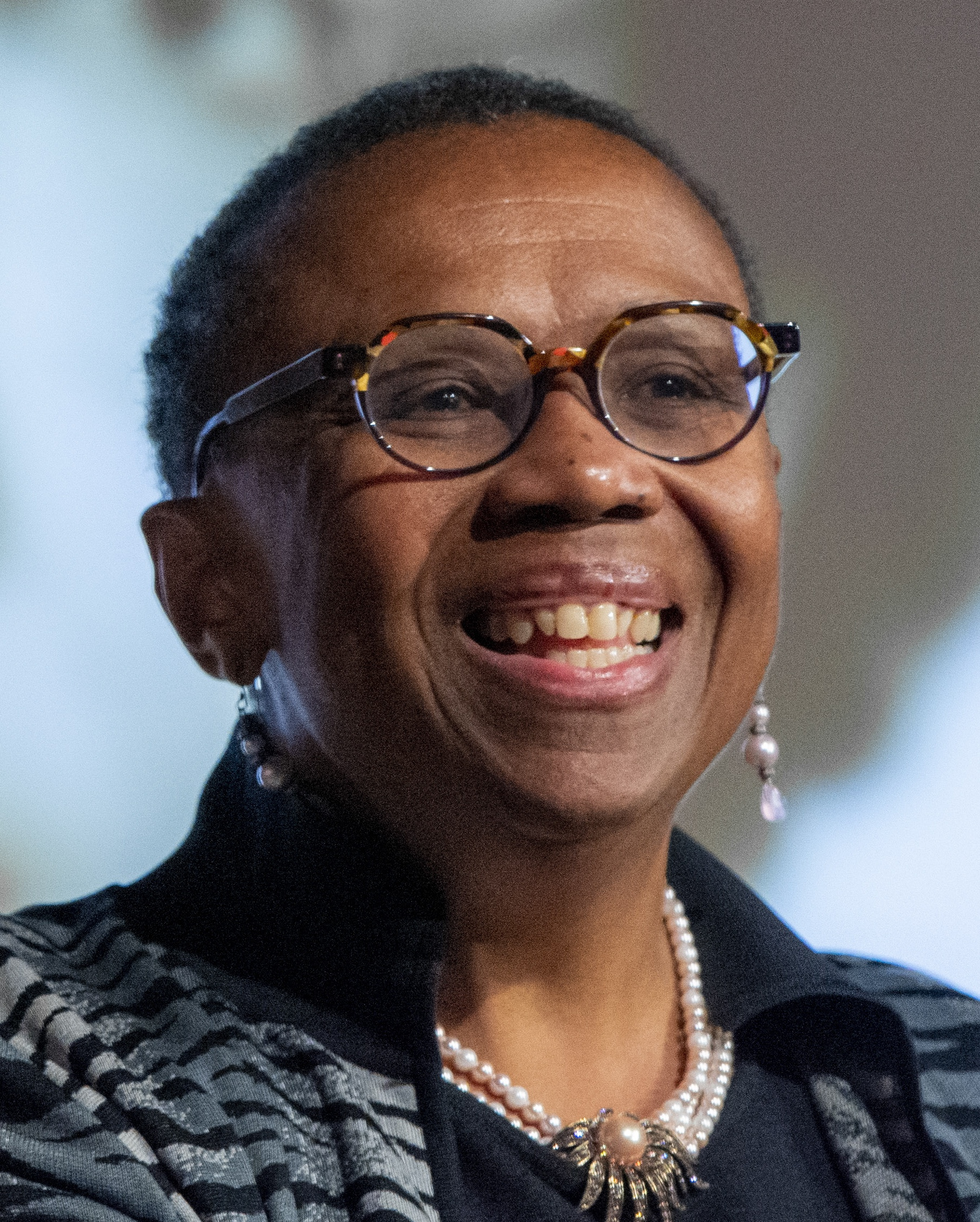
- Born: 1953 (age 72–73); West Philadelphia
- Education: Hampshire College (BA); University of Pennsylvania (MD, PhD)
- Occupations: Physician, scholar, and activist
- Known for: Chair of the Tuskegee Syphilis Study
- Medical career
- Field: Race and public health in the United States
- Institutions: Harvard School of Public Health; University of Massachusetts; University of Wisconsin; Tuskegee University; Johns Hopkins University; George Washington University (current)
- Awards: Full list

Vanessa Northington Gamble (born 1953) is an American physician, professor, and activist best known for her work as chair of the Tuskegee Syphilis Study Legacy Committee in 1996. She is currently the University Professor of Medical Humanities at George Washington University.

== Early life and education ==
Born in West Philadelphia, Gamble was primarily raised by her maternal grandmother. She attended Philadelphia High School for Girls and graduated in 1970, then studied medical sociology and biology at Hampshire College, graduating with her bachelor's degree in 1974. Gamble then attended medical school and graduate school at the University of Pennsylvania, earning her M.D. in 1983 and her Ph.D. in the history and sociology of science in 1987. She completed her graduate medical education (residency) at the University of Massachusetts.

== Career ==
Gamble began her career with appointments at the Harvard School of Public Health, Hampshire College, and the University of Massachusetts. In 1989, she was appointed an associate professor at the University of Wisconsin, where she taught courses on the intersection of race and public health in the United States. At the University of Wisconsin Medical School, she founded and was director of its Center for the Study of Race and Ethnicity.

In 1996, Gamble chaired a committee to investigate the Tuskegee Syphilis Study, an unethical, racist study of long-term syphilis infection in black men. The committee's final report, published on May 20, called for then-President Bill Clinton to issue an apology in response to the harm done to the Macon County community and Tuskegee University, and the fears of government and medical abuse it created among African Americans. The report also called for the creation of programs to educate the public regarding the study, to train health care providers, and for ethics in scientific research. President Clinton issued a formal apology on behalf of the government on May 16, 1997. In her seminal article written later in 1997, she explained however that while the Tuskegee Syphilis Study contributed to African Americans' continuing mistrust of the biomedical community, the study was not the most important reason. She called attention to a broader historical and social context that had already negatively influenced community attitudes, including countless prior medical injustices before the study's start in 1932.

She left the University of Wisconsin in 2000, and moved to Tuskegee University, where she led the first National Bioethics Center to be established at a historically black university. Beginning in 2003, Gamble was a professor at Johns Hopkins University in the school of public health. As of 2016, she is a professor of medical humanities at George Washington University, where she began teaching in 2007.

Gamble has also worked with research organizations, including the Centers for Disease Control and Prevention, National Institute of Medicine, National Institutes of Health, and the American Foundation for AIDS Research.

== Publications ==
- "Standardizing Return of Participant Results," Science (2018).
- "'Outstanding Services to Negro Health': Dr. Dorothy Boulding Ferebee, Dr. Virginia M. Alexander, and Black Women Physicians' Public Health Activism," American Journal of Public Health (2016).
- "The Immortal Life of Henrietta Lacks Reconsidered," Hastings Center Report (2014).
- "'No Struggle, No Fight, No Court Battle': The 1948 Desegregation of the University of Arkansas School of Medicine," Journal of the History of Medicine and Allied Sciences (2012).
- "'There Wasn't a Lot of Comforts in Those Days': African Americans, Public Health, and the 1918 Influenza Epidemic," Public Health Reports (2010).
- "Midian Othello Bousfield: Advocate for the Medical and Public Health Concerns of Black Americans," American Journal of Public Health (2009).
- "Standing on Shoulders," American Journal of Public Health (2009).
- "NIH Consensus Development Statement on Hydroxyurea Treatment for Sickle Cell Disease," NIH Consensus and State-of-the-Science Statements (2008).
- "National Institutes of Health Consensus Development Conference Statement: Hydroxyurea Treatment for Sickle Cell Disease," NIH Consensus and State-of-the-Science Statements (2008).
- "Introduction to Special Issue: Advancing the Ethics of Community-Based Participatory Research," Journal of Empirical Research on Human Research Ethics (2008).
- "Mistrust Among Minorities and the Trustworthiness of Medicine," PLOS Medicine (2006).
- "U.S. Policy on Health Inequities: The Interplay of Politics and Research," Journal of Health Politics, Policy and Law (2006).
- "Subcutaneous Scars." Health Affairs (2000).
- "The 'Boom and Bust Phenomenon': The Hopes, Dreams, and Broken Promises of the Contraceptive Revolution," Contraception (2000).
- "Under the Shadow of Tuskegee: African Americans and Health Care," American Journal of Public Health (1997).
- "Making a Place for Ourselves: The Black Hospital Movement, 1920-1945" (New York: Oxford University Press), 1995.

== Honors and awards ==
- Head, Association of American Medical Colleges Division of Community and Minority Programs (1999)
- Member, National Academy of Medicine (2005)
- University Professor, George Washington University (2007)
