= Oslo study =

1891–1910 human experiment in Oslo, Norway

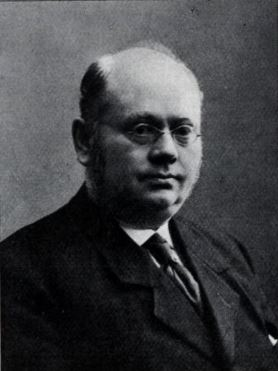
Caesar Boeck

The Oslo study (1891–1910) was an observational study of untreated syphilis at Oslo University Hospital, Rikshospitalet in Oslo, Norway. Under the supervision of the department head, Cæsar Boeck, treatment was withheld from approximately 2,000 patients with syphilis between the period of 1891 and 1910. The results of Boeck's patient observations were later documented by his successor Edvin Bruusgaard in the paper "The Fate of Syphilitics who had received no Specific Treatment" (1929).

The results of the study greatly influenced American researchers who conducted the Tuskegee Syphilis Study (1932–1972), in which treatment was withheld from African American men with syphilis.

== Background ==
In the 18th century, the standard treatment for syphilis was mercury, typically in the form of mercuric chloride, because it was believed that the sweating and salivation caused by mercury would help patients purge harmful substances from their bodies. As the effects of mercury poisoning became increasingly well documented in 19th century, many physicians began to reject mercury as a cure. Due to rapid urbanization and poverty, the number of syphilis cases in Norway rose during the 1870s and 1880s. Economic conditions also contributed to the growth of Norway's prostitution industry. In an attempt to curb the spread of syphilis, prostitutes were arrested and subjected to public medical examinations. Those found to have symptoms of syphilis were involuntarily sent to hospitals for treatment.

== Study ==
Cæsar Boeck, head of the Department of Dermatology at Oslo University Hospital, Rikshospitalet in Oslo, Norway, believed that mercury was ineffective and that it interfered with the body's natural defense mechanisms. He consequently prohibited the use of mercury to treat patients and began withholding all treatment from patients in his wards. These patients included men and women with primary and secondary syphilis. Under Boeck's direction, treatment was ultimately withheld from approximately 2,000 patients between 1891 and 1910. He recorded detailed observations of his patients, who were hospitalized until their symptoms had cleared sufficiently. Patients remained hospitalized for an average of 3.6 months, with the shortest hospital stay being 1 month and the longest being 12 months.

Caesar Boeck may have been influenced by his uncle, Carl Wilhelm Boeck, who also opposed the use of mercury as treatment. Carl Wilhelm preferred the treatment method developed by French physician Joseph-Alexandre Auzias-Turenne, who exposed patients infected with syphilis to infectious material taken from the chancres of patients with early-stage syphilis. This was intended to inoculate patients against the disease in a manner similar to variolation. Carl Wilhelm exposed 1,075 patients to infectious material, which had a negative impact on their health. Caesar Boeck took a different approach by recommending that his patients improve their health through rest and diet. He began administering the antibiotic drug Salvarsan to his patients in 1910, shortly after the drug was introduced.

Between 1925 and 1927, Edvin Bruusgaard conducted a follow up study to document the health outcomes for 473 former patients who had been denied treatment by Boeck. He published his findings in a paper titled "The Fate of Syphilitics who had received no Specific Treatment" in 1929. His paper claimed that 27.9% of the surveyed patients had been spontaneously cured. It also claimed that 70% of all syphilis patients were not inconvenienced by the disease, although it acknowledged the severe symptoms experienced by the other 30%, including cardiovascular disease and premature death.

Among Bruusgaard findings, 13 cases of general paresis (five males), three being fatal (two males) and 6 tabes dorsalis cases (four males) were found (2 fatal cases both male). Nine aneurisma aortae were found among males, three dead. Among 23 autopsied males, 8 aortitis, five of simple character, one aneurisma and two aortic incompetency were seen. An interesting fact became obvious in comparison of Gjestland and Bruusgaard finding : many Bruusgaard patients were clearly distinct being from Gjestland cohort.

In the 1940s and 1950s, Trygve Gjestland re-examined the cases of 1,404 patients, 80% of the total number of patients who were denied treatment by Boeck. He had the intention of determining the effect of untreated early-stage syphilis on mortality, and the impact of late stage syphilis. Gjestland published his findings as a thesis in 1955. The statistics he published that relate to long-term outcomes of syphilis are still used in 21st-century textbooks.

Features of the study (from 1955 thesis and annex) :

Gjestland studied 1,404 cases, including 1,331 adults, belonging to a cohort assembled between 1891 and 1910, with the great majority of patients having been hospitalized before 1901. From an initial population of 1,978 patients, he excluded 574 non-residents of Oslo, a significant decision that reduced the male subset from 731 to 446 cases. Of the 1,404 patients, a total of 953 were successfully followed up, including 331 men.

Among these 953 patients, 694 had died before study completion. Nineteen of them presented a clinical picture of general paresis(all cases proved fatal); four had active tabes dorsalis, one of which was fatal; and 17 had suffered from other major forms of neurosyphilis, fatal in eight cases. These neurological forms were equally distributed in absolute number between the sexes. Twelve cases were confirmed by autopsy, including seven cases of general paresis and one of tabes dorsalis.

Among these 694 cases, 75 died of direct syphilitic implication (39 males), 28 being caused by neurosyphilis, all others, except two females cases of liver syphilis (one post mortem case) being related to aorta involvement.

Quality of diagnosis data among cohort death varied a lot : the best part being the 209 autopsied subset. 146 are based on death certificat, the death being fully undocumented in 39 cases.Analysing the 61 aortitis and 23 cases of parenchymatous neurosyphilis, the following remark can be made on positive diagnosis :

- 33 autopsied complicated aortitis (19 males) are beyond controverse, the 28 clinically diagnosed are 21 aortic incompétency and 5 aneurism, two being inclassified;

- the four tabetic need no special comment, the clinical feature of tabes being, as a rule, typical; among 19 cases of general paresis, among twelve unautopsied cases were confirmed by positive spinal fluid examination nine cases of the 12 cases, such confirmation lacking in three clinical cases;

- among fatal 8 meningeal or gummatous cases, four are verified post mortem, 2 other have spinal fluid positive examination, the two last cases being clinical.

As a rule, positive diagnosis is strongly based. Some doubt must remains about sensibility of tertiary lesions detection : among 582 syphilitic dying more than ten years after infection only 172 were autopsied, 32 complicated aortitis being apparent among them. Among 33 complicated aortitis, 8 cases were found only post mortem with special mention of 3 aneurism and two ostial involvement (5 among a general total of 14 autopsied lesions of such character, and perhaps two other ostial coronary lesions being discovered by autopsy, the meaning of "cardiovascular syphilis used by Gjestland being loose in signification).

No doubt, a few visceral lesions and some others aortitis must be buried, specially among the 100 so called non syphilitic death caused by heart diseases, Gjestland made no discussion about death no included among the 75 syphilitic cases.

Among the 694 deaths, 61 complicated aortitides were diagnosed, including 15 aortic aneurysms. Thirty-three of these cases were autopsied, including 10 aortic aneurysms. Thirty-four cases of complicated aortitis, including nine aneurysms, occurred in men.

Overall mortality was substantial: 267 deaths occurred early, within the first twenty years following infection, in both sexes combined.

A total of 259 patients, including 72 men, were still alive at the end of the investigations in 1949/1950. Among these survivors, three cases of active tabes dorsalis, one case of stationary general paresis following malarial therapy, and six cases of complicated aortitis—including five aortic aneurysms—were documented; in general, these conditions had been known for a long time.

== Impact on the Tuskegee Syphilis Study ==
The Oslo study had a major impact on the Tuskegee Syphilis Study, which was conducted in the United States between 1932 and 1972. Bruusgaard's paper on the Oslo study was the only available study of untreated syphilis in 1931, when the U.S. Public Health Service commissioned Taliaferro Clark's proposal to study the progression of syphilis in African American men.

While Gjestland was working on his thesis, he also attracted interest from American researchers involved in the Tuskegee study. Veneriologist Joseph Earle Moore, a consultant for the Tuskegee study, visited Oslo to review Gjestland's data in 1947, and J.R. Heller, head of the Venereal Disease Division of the United States Public Health Service, also expressed interest. As a result of Heller and Moore's influence, Gjestland received funding from the United States Public Health Service. While Gjestland was a visiting scholar at Columbia University in New York City, he met with researchers from Tuskegee to discuss their findings. Their research was included in chapter 2 of his thesis.

Based on the Oslo study, the Tuskegee researchers determined that syphilis was more dangerous and transmissible without treatment. Moore stated that the Oslo study should never be repeated. However, he and the other Tuskegee researchers still conducted their study of African American men, under the justification that African Americans were less intelligent and more promiscuous. They also believed that, outside of the study, African Americans were unlikely to seek medical treatment for syphilis. Moore asserted that "syphilis in the negro is in many respects almost a different disease from syphilis in the white."

The Oslo experiment likely also influenced Hugh S. Cumming's hypothesis that the Tuskegee study might demonstrate the non-necessity of treatment for syphilis.
