= Eugene Dibble =

American physician (1893–1968)

Eugene H. Dibble Jr.
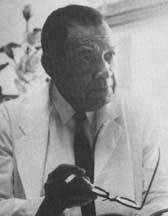
- Born: August 14, 1893; Camden, South Carolina
- Died: June 1, 1968 (aged 74)
- Medical career
- Profession: Medical Director
- Institutions: Tuskegee Institute

Eugene Heriot Dibble Jr. (1893–1968) was an American physician and head of the John A. Andrew Memorial Hospital at the Tuskegee Institute in Alabama. He played an important role in the Tuskegee Syphilis Study, which was a clinical study conducted on syphilis in African American males from 1932 to 1972 and which resulted in the deaths of over 100 people.

== Early life and education ==
Eugene Heriot Dibble Jr. was born in Camden, South Carolina on August 14, 1893. Dibble came from a prosperous African American family. In 1926, he married Helen Taylor, the daughter of MIT's first African-American graduate. They had five children and of them, their son Robert, also became a physician. However, he spent the majority of his adult life in Tuskegee, Alabama, where he would eventually work at the John A. Andrew Memorial Hospital.

Dibble received his B.A. from Atlanta University in 1915, and his medical degree from Howard University in 1919. He interned in Washington D.C. at Freedmen's Hospital and completed his surgical residency at the John A. Andrew Memorial Hospital in Tuskegee, Alabama in 1923.

== Medical career ==
After his residency, he worked as assistant medical director until he was appointed surgeon-in-chief of the U.S. Veterans Administration Hospital at Tuskegee. In 1925, he was named medical director of the John A. Andrew Memorial Hospital and stayed until 1936. He returned to the Veterans Administration Hospital in 1936 in order to reorganize it as its manager and medical director.

During his time at the Veterans Administration Hospital, Dibble established a postgraduate training program for the hospital. He also served in the army during both World Wars. During World War II, all managers of Veterans Administration hospitals were given the rank of Colonel and from 1944 to 1946, he was commissioned at this rank in the Army Medical Corps. This made Dibble the first African-American medical officer to be commissioned at this rank. In 1946, he became the medical director, for the second time, of the John A. Andrew Memorial Hospital until 1965, when his cancer had worsened, forcing him to retire. Dibble also served as a member of the board of trustees at Meharry Medical College in Nashville, Tennessee.

== Role in Tuskegee Syphilis Study ==
The Tuskegee Syphilis Study was an experiment conducted throughout a period of forty years, from 1932 to 1972, in which doctors observed the progression or the natural course of untreated syphilis in 600 African American men. The study was initiated by the U.S. Public Health Service and the subjects did not know that they were a part of the experiment and that they were not being treated.

Dibble was head of the John Andrew Hospital at the Tuskegee Institute and spearheaded the Tuskegee study in 1932. The study was held at the Tuskegee Institute due to Dibble's persuasion of Dr. Robert Moton, the president of the institute, to hold the experiments at his hospital. He saw the Tuskegee study as "very valuable training for our students as well as for the interns.... our own hospital and the Tuskegee Institute would get credit for this piece of research work."

Dibble knew that his hospital and Tuskegee Institute needed to provide research opportunities as well as clinical care. When the offer to work on the study came, he accepted it for the opportunity to gain resources as well as funding for medical care. The study provided specialists for the patients, and Raymond A. Vonderlehr was appointed to Dibble. In the 1950s, Dibble reported on the study as part of the work of John A. Andrew Memorial Hospital and titled it: "the U.S. Public Health Service study of syphilis in the Negro male in Macon County." In his report he mentions the study and the examinations but the word "untreated" is omitted. Dibble died four years before the study made national news and it was never known whether or not he knew about the complete ongoing of the study. He was not alive for questions to be asked. Susan M. Reverby describes Dibble, in her book, Examining Tuskegee: The Infamous Syphilis Study and Its Legacy, as committed to the improvement of conditions for African-Americans. He was not a researcher, but he did recognize its importance in medicine.

Dibble and his staff also assisted with some aspects of the study, particularly physical examinations, X-rays, and spinal taps to look for signs of neurosyphilis. Furthermore, he recommended Eunice Rivers as the project's nurse.

== Controversy ==
As the Tuskegee Syphilis Study raised a host of issues about racism, Dibble's participation and encouragement of the study has been highly controversial, especially from his standing as a Black physician. The very premise of the study was based on the assumption that African-Americans would not seek treatment for syphilis and that the disease affected them differently than other races.

Another source of controversy arises from the degree of Black cooperation in the study, which to this day, remains unclear. Although Dibble understood the nature of the experiment and supported it, there is evidence that some Blacks who assisted in the study were not aware of the true nature of the experiment. However, many such as Fred Gray, a legal post who had been counsel to the Tuskegee Institute, supported Dibble and objected to holding Dibble accountable for the controversial events of the Tuskegee Syphilis Study, arguing that Dibble was just as much a victim as the participants. His argument was based upon class divisions, and he argued that because Black institutions relied heavily upon funding from white philanthropy, they could not afford to object to the U.S. government for participation in the study.

The Tuskegee Syphilis Study spurred outrage for its mistreatment and denial of treatment of Blacks, and many questions have been raised for the participation of Black physicians such as Dibble. It has been suggested that their participation could also be accounted due to class divisions between Black physicians and the Black community. Black, upper-middle class physicians did not identify themselves with the poor Black community. Therefore, their participation in the syphilis study was an attempt to prove to the white medical community of their capability in medical research.

Additional controversy extends from the denial of treatment for the syphilis patients. Patients were given treatments that were ineffective in order to deceive them and have them continue their participation in the study. Even after penicillin became a widespread treatment method for syphilis in the 1950s, the patients were denied access to the drug.

== Legacy ==
Although he is a controversial figure, Dibble is also largely remembered and praised for his work in promoting professional racial equality within the medical community. His influence in the John A. Andrew Clinical Society was one of his main means of accomplishing this. Through the Society's support of an annual clinic that provided medical assistance to needy patients, African-American physicians, who had largely been denied hospital privileges, were provided them a chance to work with other specialists and physicians. The clinic was organized and directed by Dr. John A. Kenney Sr., who was in 1912 surgeon-in-chief of John A. Andrew Memorial Hospital.

In the late 1940s, the society began to change its vision to providing courses in medicine and surgery for African-Americans in the South. The goal was to inform attending physicians about the latest techniques in medicine and surgery. However, the Society was discontinued in 1969 as African-Americans began to be accepted and integrated into other medical societies.

The Society also made advances in medical education for African-Americans in 1921 when it created the first postgraduate course in medicine and surgery for African-Americans in the South. The four-week program found huge success, being attended by 126 physicians and surgeons who treated 1,136 patients. The program continued into the late 1940s. After 1949, the Society changed its objective to providing an expanded teaching clinic, and provided programs in which attending physicians would be informed about the latest techniques in medicine and surgery. Dibble played an instrumental role in the Society, serving as Secretary of the Society from 1924 to 1926, and then from 1946 and 1965. He resigned from the Society on August 4, 1965.

Even after his resignation from the Society, Dibble continued to be active in advancing medical education for African-Americans. During the late 1950s and early 1960s, Dibble made various trips with the Baptist World Alliance. He visited many medical physicians around the world and provided medical care to underdeveloped countries in Africa and Asia. Dibble also helped students who wanted to go to medical school in the United States. He was awarded the 17th Distinguished Service Medal of the National Medical Association at the 67th Annual Convention in Chicago, Illinois that took place from August 13 – 16, 1962.

Even after his retirement in 1965, Dibble had a passion for teaching. He maintained an office in order to work with free clinics and teach young doctors and nurses. Dibble's interest in mortality rates for mothers and children also led him to work with maternity clinics to improve early diagnosis of maternity problems.

== Death ==
Dibble died on June 1, 1968.

== Awards and honors ==
Dibble was a member of both Alpha Phi Alpha and Chi Delta Mu.

Dibble earned numerous awards and much recognition throughout his lifetime. During Dibble's administration at the Veterans Administration Hospital, President Franklin D. Roosevelt visited in 1936, while First Lady Eleanor Roosevelt visited in both 1939 and 1941.

In 1956, Dibble was selected as an honorary member of Alpha Omega Alpha, a society which recognizes excellence in the profession of medicine, through the Gamma chapter of the District of Columbia. The next year, he received a distinguished service medal as an Alumni Award from his alma mater, Howard University. He also served as a member of the Board of Trustees of Meharry Medical College in Nashville, Tennessee. In addition, he also served as part of the editorial board of the Journal of the National Medical Association. His work is said to have significantly contributed to the growth of the journal.
