= David Feldshuh =

American physician and playwright (born 1944)

David Mark Feldshuh
- Born: January 31, 1944 (age 82); New York City, New York, U.S.
- Occupations: Physician; playwright; director; actor; teacher
- Notable work: Miss Evers' Boys (1992)
- Spouse: Martha A. Frommelt (m. 1986)
- Relatives: Tovah Feldshuh (sister); Noah Feldshuh (son)

David Mark Feldshuh (born January 31, 1944, New York City) is an American playwright, director, actor, educator, and board-certified emergency physician. He is best known for the play Miss Evers' Boys, based on the Tuskegee syphilis experiment, which was a finalist for the 1992 Pulitzer Prize for Drama.

== Miss Evers' Boys ==
Miss Evers' Boys was developed at Minneapolis's Illusion Theater and Robert Redford's Sundance Institute, receiving the New American Play Award sponsored by the Geraldine R. Dodge Foundation. The 1997 HBO film adaptation of Miss Evers' Boys (adapted by Walter Bernstein) was nominated for 11 Emmy Awards (winning four) and two Golden Globe Awards (winning one). Miss Evers' Boys was recognized as Best Picture and given the President's Award for television presentations addressing vital social issues. The film also received the NAACP Image Award for Outstanding Television Movie, the CableACE Award for Best Picture, and two Golden Globe Awards. Public attention surrounding the film contributed to a formal apology by U.S. President Bill Clinton to survivors of the Tuskegee Syphilis Study in 1997.

Miss Evers' Boys has been widely used as an educational resource in medical schools and ethics curricula examining cultural bias in healthcare. For its educational impact, Miss Evers' Boys received the National Education Association Award for Achievement in Learning Through Broadcasting and the American Medical Association's Helen Hayes ("Freddy") Award for Best Film on a Medical Subject. Feldshuh further explored the subject as co-producer of the documentary Susceptible to Kindness, which includes interviews with survivors of the Tuskegee study and received multiple international film awards.

== Education and early career ==
Feldshuh earned a Bachelor of Arts degree from Dartmouth College, graduating with honors in philosophy and election to Phi Beta Kappa. He trained at the London Academy of Music and Dramatic Art and studied mime with Jacques Lecoq. He later completed a Ph.D. in Theatre at the University of Minnesota, focusing on creativity and actor training.

Feldshuh began his professional acting career as a McKnight Fellow at the Guthrie Theater in Minneapolis and remains a lifelong member of Actors' Equity. He was later appointed Associate Director at the Guthrie Theater, where over seven years he directed, wrote, adapted, and created productions for both the mainstage and experimental spaces. Credits during this period include The Coronation of Poppea (Minnesota Opera Company); Orlando by Virginia Woolf (Illusion Theater); and Becket, An Italian Straw Hat, Baal, The Measures Taken (Guthrie Theater) and the Guthrie's first Christmas Carol (direction and co-adaptation). His play Fables Here and Then (University of Minnesota Press) was the first Guthrie Theater production to tour, traveling to 52 cities throughout the Midwest.

While pursuing his theatre career, Feldshuh also trained in medicine, earning an M.D. from the University of Minnesota. He completed a residency in Emergency Medicine at Hennepin County Medical Center in Minneapolis and became board certified in emergency medicine, later attaining Fellowship in the American College of Emergency Physicians (1983).

== Filmmaking ==
Feldshuh began his directing career in the early 1970s with Just Be There, an independent drama about a Vietnam War veteran's readjustment to civilian life in Minneapolis. In 1977, the film was acquired by American Films Limited, retitled The Swinging Teacher, and remarketed as an exploitation film, though it maintained its serious dramatic content.

== Other writing and adaptations ==
Feldshuh has written and directed numerous original works and adaptations. His adaptation of Sophocles' Antigone received its professional premiere at Center Stage in Baltimore in 2019. Feldshuh made the script available online without royalties, contributing to its widespread use in educational and performance settings in the United States and internationally.

In addition to stage work, Feldshuh has written screenplays, television scripts, and short fiction. Later theatrical works include Dancing with Giants, depicting the friendship between German boxer Max Schmeling and his Jewish manager Yussle Jacobs before World War II, and Virginia's Gift (originally titled Orlando's Gift), inspired by Virginia Woolf's life and writings. Feldshuh's short story, "Are You Satisfied, Thomas Becket?" was published in the book, The Emergency Room: Lives Saved and Lost — Doctors Tell Their Stories, edited by Dan Sachs, Little, Brown and Company, 1996.

== Teaching and academic work ==
In 1984, Feldshuh joined Cornell University to help lead the creation of a new building complex dedicated to theatre, film, and dance and became the first Artistic Director of the Schwartz Center for the Performing Arts. Productions at Cornell with a company of professional and student actors have included King Lear, Angels in America, The Cradle Will Rock, Amadeus (featuring actor and Feldshuh's former LAMDA roommate, Roshan Seth), The Prime of Miss Jean Brodie (featuring Tovah Feldshuh), and Leonard Bernstein's Mass, staged with a mixed cast of 138 student and professional singer-actors.

Over more than forty years as a teacher at Cornell, Feldshuh developed multiple original courses, including Executive Presence, a 15-week distance-learning course applying theatrical techniques to train public speakers and reduce performance anxiety. Feldshuh was recognized as a Stephen H. Weiss Presidential Fellow, Cornell University's highest teaching award.

== Honors ==
Feldshuh received the Distinguished Service Award from the National Center for Bioethics at Tuskegee University.

== Personal life ==
Feldshuh was born to a Jewish family in New York City, the son of Lillian (née Kaplan) and Sidney Feldshuh, a lawyer. He was raised in Scarsdale, New York. He married Martha A. Frommelt in 1986. He is the brother of actress Tovah Feldshuh, and father of X Ambassadors former guitarist Noah Feldshuh.
