= Eunice Rivers Laurie =

American nurse (1899–1986)

Eunice Verdell Rivers Laurie
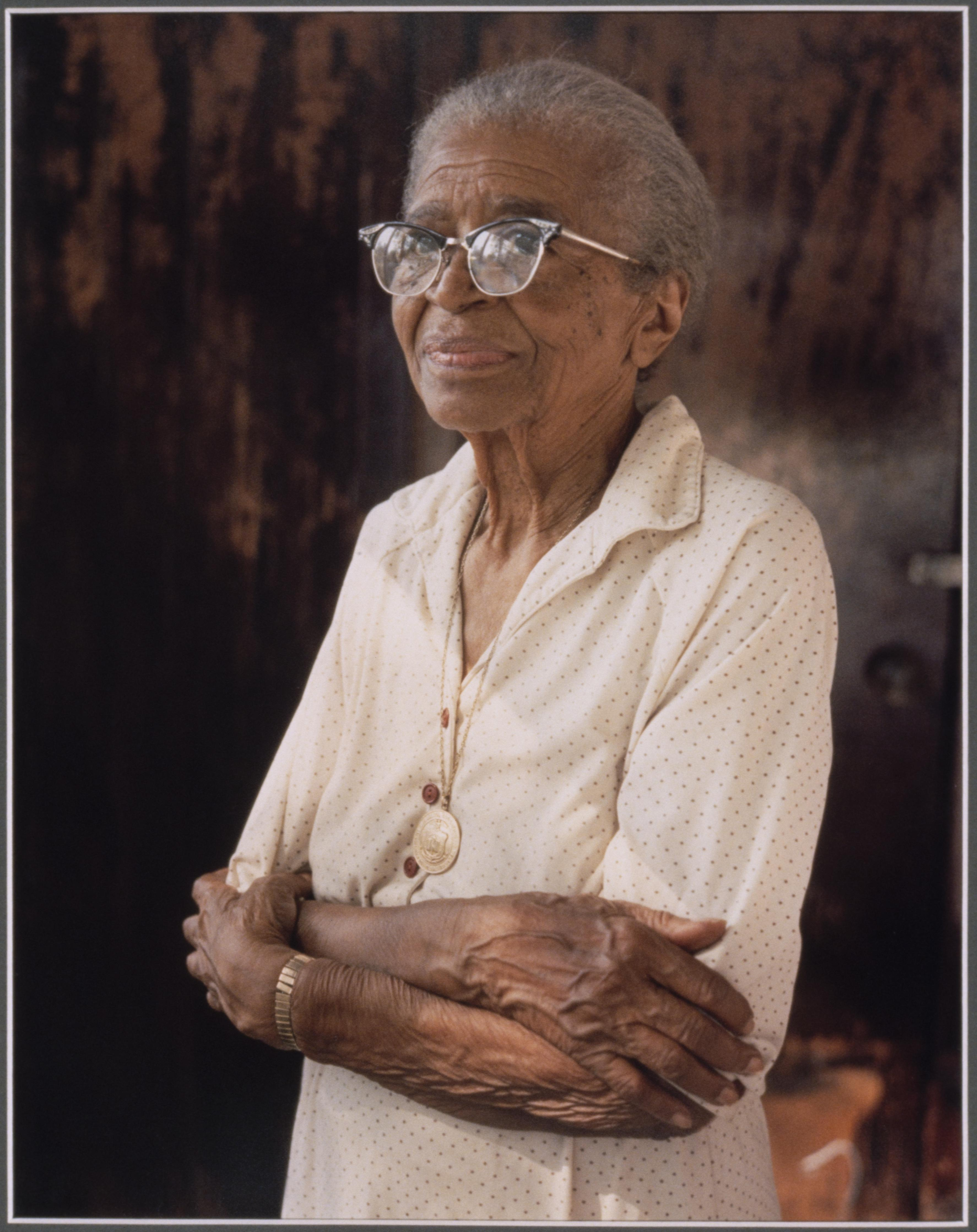
- Laurie in 1981
- Born: November 12, 1899; Jakin, Georgia, U.S
- Died: August 28, 1986 (aged 86); Tuskegee, Alabama, U.S.
- Other name: Eunice Rivers
- Occupation: Nurse
- Known for: Medical study coordinator
- Spouse: Julius Laurie

Eunice Verdell Rivers Laurie (1899–1986) was an African American nurse who worked in the state of Alabama. She is known for her work as one of the nurses of the U.S. Public Health Service Syphilis Study in Macon County from 1932 to 1972 which was "arguably the most infamous biomedical research study in U.S. history."

== Early life and education ==
Born into a farming family in rural Georgia in 1899, Eunice Verdell Rivers was the oldest of three daughters. Originating from a poor, working-class family, Rivers' education allowed her access to middle-class life. Her mother, who died when Rivers was 15 years old, encouraged her to attend school from a young age. Her father, who was a proponent of education, encouraged her to become a nurse. In order to ensure that his three daughters received sufficient education, he worked extended shifts at the sawmill to finance their studies.

In 1918, Rivers' father sent her to study at the Tuskegee Institute. For the first year, she took classes in "handicrafts". Following her father's advice, Eunice inquired and enrolled in the Institute's School of Nursing, where she graduated in 1922. After graduation, Rivers worked in the public health sector from 1923 until well after her retirement in 1965.

== Career ==
Beginning in January 1923, Rivers worked for the Tuskegee Institute Movable School. As part of the school, she provided various public health services to African-American men and women in rural Alabama and became a trusted health authority for African-American farming families in the area around Tuskegee, Alabama. She supplied adult education programs in agriculture, home economics, and health. In her work with the Movable School, Rivers was an employee of the Alabama Bureau of Child Welfare.

Beginning in 1926, the state transferred her to the Bureau of Vital Statistics, where her projects included improving birth and death registration, regulating and training midwives, and reducing infant mortality. She was instrumental in creating a system that tracked the number of births and deaths in the state of Alabama. She also helped to regulate midwifery and lower infant mortality rates. She continued to work with the Movable School, traveling around Alabama, but this time focusing on pregnant women and midwives. She visited over 20 counties in her first year and was noted for tending to 1,100 people during a particularly busy month.

=== Impact on race relations ===
Rivers became one of the first African-Americans to be employed by the United States Public Health Service, thus paving the way for other people of color in this area of service.

She was the third recipient of the Oveta Culp Hobby Award, the highest award the Department of Health, Education, and Welfare could grant an employee.

=== Tuskegee syphilis study ===
Beginning in 1932, Rivers worked for the United States Public Health Service on The Study of Untreated Syphilis in the Negro Male in Macon County, Alabama, popularly known as the Tuskegee syphilis experiment. She recruited 600 African-American men with syphilis for the study and worked to keep them enrolled as participants in the program. In exchange for their participation, the study offered participants free medical care, which Rivers provided. Rivers was the experiment's only consistent full-time staff member.

Although the study was initially planned to run only six months, over time, this endeavor extended to a duration of 40 years. During the entire study, the participants were not informed that the ailment they called "bad blood" was actually syphilis. When the study started, arsphenamine (Salvarsan) and Neosalvarsan were the only available treatments for syphilis, and both compounds had dangerous side effects. However, even after the 1940s, when the discovery of penicillin offered a reliable and safe cure for the disease, study participants did not receive treatment. After the New York Times and Washington Post revealed that study participants had been allowed to suffer rather than receiving a known safe treatment, the Public Health Service ended it in 1972.

Historians have offered a variety of interpretations for why Rivers continued her role in a project that, by modern standards of medical ethics, was completely unethical.

==== Public perception ====
Following the public disclosure in 1972 of the unethical practices associated with the Tuskegee Study, Rivers largely withdrew from public comment on the matter. Interpretations of her role in the study have since varied from support to condemnation. Some regard her as a dedicated nurse who carried out her duties within the framework of the study, continuing to provide care to participants. Others view her actions more critically, suggesting she used her education and position to maintain employment and favorable standing while contributing to the continued exploitation of the study subjects involved.

Rivers played a central role in both recruiting and retaining participants in the study. In addition to her administrative responsibilities, she provided participants with limited medical care and emotional support, including listening to their concerns, advising on non-hospital resources, offering comfort, and distributing basic treatments such as vitamins. She was instrumental in establishing the Miss Rivers Lodge, a program that offered financial assistance for burial expenses to participants' families in exchange for their continued involvement in the study.

While the study occasionally facilitated access to care for conditions unrelated to syphilis, it ultimately withheld effective treatment for the disease itself, resulting in preventable deaths and lasting harm to the individuals involved and their communities.

== Later life and death ==
In 1977, Rivers was interviewed for the Black Women Oral History Project.

She died in 1986.
