= Peter Buxtun =

Tuskegee syphilis study whistleblower (1937–2024)

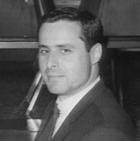
- An undated photo of Buxtun
- Born: Peter Jan Buxbaum; September 29, 1937; Prague, Czechoslovakia
- Died: May 18, 2024 (aged 86); Rocklin, California, U.S.
- Occupations: Epidemiologist, social worker
- Known for: Whistleblowing on the Tuskegee Syphilis Study

Peter Buxtun (sometimes referred to as Peter Buxton)(September 29, 1937 – May 18, 2024) was an American epidemiologist. He was an employee of the United States Public Health Service who became known as the whistleblower responsible for ending the Tuskegee Syphilis Study.

== Career ==
Buxtun, then a 28-year-old social worker and epidemiologist in San Francisco, was hired by the Public Health Service in December 1965 to interview patients with sexually transmitted diseases. In the course of his duties, he learned of the Tuskegee Experiment from co-workers. He later said, "I didn't want to believe it. This was the Public Health Service. We didn't do things like that." In November 1966, he filed an official protest on ethical grounds with the Service's Division of Venereal Diseases; this was rejected on the grounds that the experiment was not yet complete. He filed another protest in November 1968, seven months after the assassination of Martin Luther King Jr., pointing out the political volatility of the study; again, his concerns were ruled irrelevant.

In 1972, Buxtun leaked information on the Tuskegee experiment to Jean Heller of the Associated Press. It first appeared in the Washington Star. Heller's story exposing the experiment was published on July 25, 1972; It became front-page news in The New York Times the following day. Senator Ted Kennedy called Congressional hearings, at which Buxtun and officials from the U.S. Department of Health, Education, and Welfare testified. The experiment was terminated shortly afterwards. In 1997, President Bill Clinton invited surviving Tuskegee study subjects to the White House, where he offered a formal apology and described the government's actions over four decades as "shameful" and "clearly racist".

In May 1999, Buxtun attended the launch of a memorial center and public exhibit to the experiment in Tuskegee, Alabama. On November 4, 2019, Buxtun was inducted as an honorary member of Delta Omega, the honorary society in public health.

== Personal life ==
Buxtun was born in 1937 in Prague. He was of Jewish and Czech descent. With the rise of Adolf Hitler and Nazism, Buxtun and family moved to the United States later that year. They settled on a farm in Oregon's Willamette Valley.

Peter graduated from the University of Oregon with a degree in European history and served as a medic in the U.S. Army. He graduated from UC Law San Francisco in 1971.

Buxtun died from Alzheimer's disease in Rocklin, California, on May 18, 2024, at the age of 86.
