= Tuskegee Syphilis Study =

1932–1972 human experiment in Alabama, United States

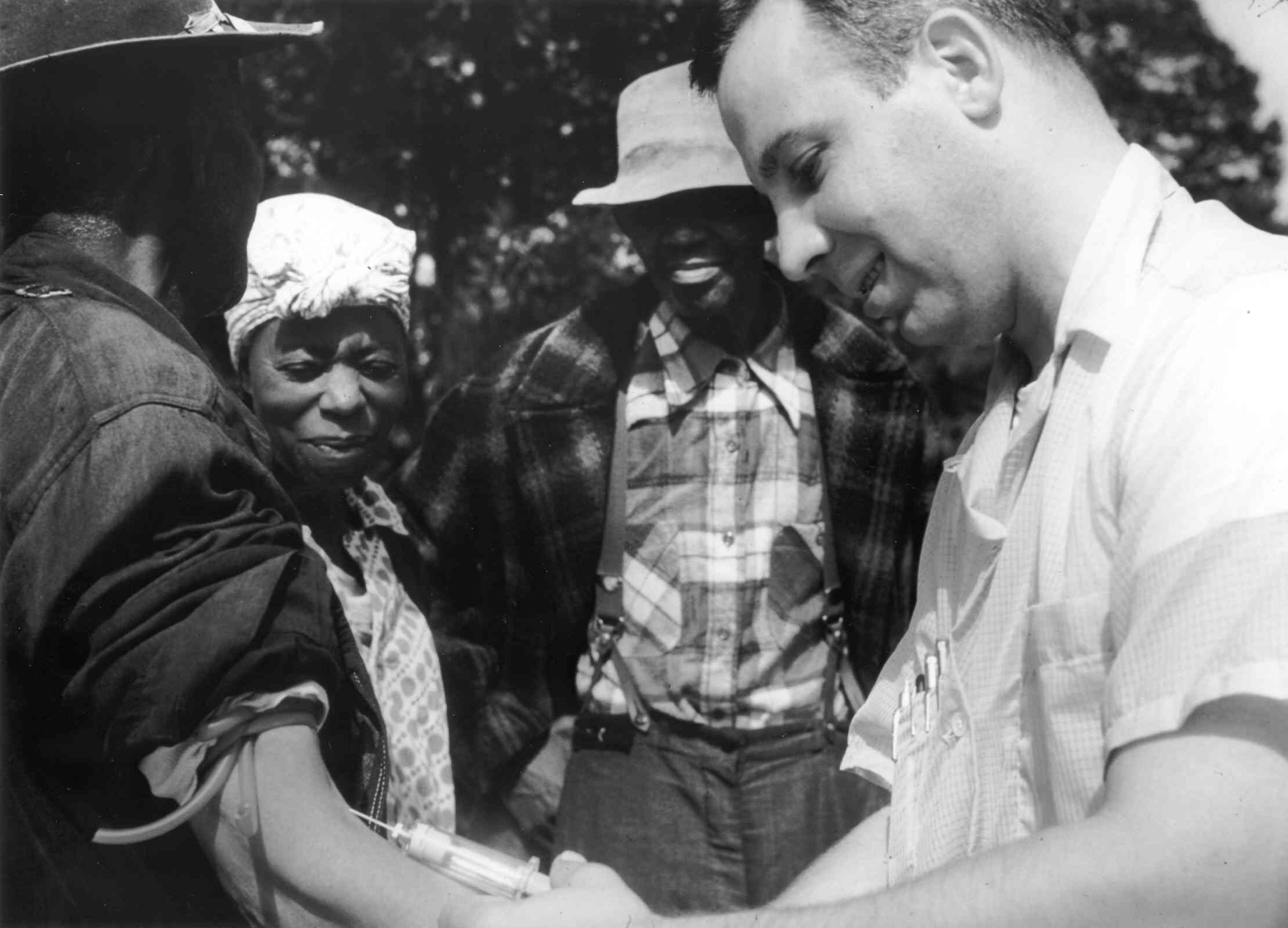
- Walter Edmondson draws blood from one of the Tuskegee test subjects
- Dates: 1932–1972
- Locations: Tuskegee, Alabama
- Funding: U.S. Public Health Service (PHS)

The Tuskegee Study of Untreated Syphilis in the Negro Male (informally referred to as the Tuskegee Experiment or Tuskegee Syphilis Study) was a study conducted between 1932 and 1972 by the United States Public Health Service (PHS) and the Centers for Disease Control and Prevention (CDC) on a group of 399 African American men with syphilis as well as a control group without. The purpose of the study was to observe the effects of the disease when untreated, to the point of death and autopsy. Although there had been effective treatments to reduce the severity of the disease since the 1920s, the use of penicillin for the treatment of syphilis was widespread as of 1945. The men were not informed of the nature of the study, proper treatment was withheld, and more than 100 died as a result.

The Public Health Service started the study in 1932 in collaboration with Tuskegee University (then the Tuskegee Institute), a historically Black college in Alabama. In the study, investigators enrolled 600 impoverished African American sharecroppers from Macon County, Alabama. Of these men, 399 had latent syphilis, with a control group of 201 men who were not infected. As an incentive for participation in the study, the men were promised free medical care and promised funeral expenses. While the men were provided with both medical and mental care that they otherwise would not have received, they were deceived by the PHS, who never informed them of their syphilis diagnosis and who provided disguised placebos, ineffective treatments, and diagnostic procedures, such as lumbar punctures, as treatment for "bad blood".

The men were initially told that the experiment was only going to last six months, but it was extended to 40 years. After funding for treatment was lost, the study was continued without informing the men that they would never be treated. None of the infected men were treated with penicillin despite the fact that, by 1947, the antibiotic was widely available and had become the standard treatment for syphilis. The study continued, under numerous Public Health Service supervisors, until 1972, when a leak to the press resulted in its termination on November 16 of that year. By then, 28 patients had died directly from syphilis, 100 died from complications related to syphilis, 40 of the patients' wives were infected with syphilis, and 19 children were born with congenital syphilis.

The 40-year Tuskegee Study was a major violation of ethical standards and has been cited as "arguably the most infamous biomedical research study in U.S. history". Its revelation led to the 1979 Belmont Report and to the establishment of the Office for Human Research Protections (OHRP) and federal laws and regulations requiring institutional review boards for the protection of human subjects in studies. The OHRP manages this responsibility within the United States Department of Health and Human Services (HHS). Its revelation has also been an important cause of distrust in medical science and the US government amongst African Americans. In 1997, President Bill Clinton formally apologized on behalf of the United States to victims of the study, calling it shameful and racist. "What was done cannot be undone, but we can end the silence," he said. "We can stop turning our heads away. We can look at you in the eye, and finally say, on behalf of the American people, what the United States government did was shameful, and I am sorry."

== History ==
=== Study details ===
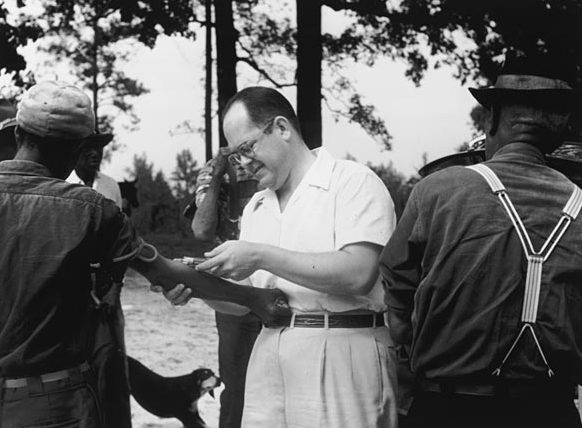
Subject blood draw, c. 1953

In 1928, the "Oslo Study of Untreated Syphilis" had reported on the pathologic manifestations of untreated syphilis in several hundred white males. This study was a retrospective study since investigators pieced together information from the histories of patients who had already contracted syphilis but remained untreated for some time.

The U.S. Public Health Service Syphilis Study at Tuskegee group decided to build on the Oslo work and perform a prospective study to complement it. The U.S. Public Health Service Syphilis Study at Tuskegee began as a 6-month descriptive epidemiological study of the range of pathology associated with syphilis in the population of Macon County. The researchers involved with the study reasoned that they were not harming the men involved in the study, under the presumption that they were unlikely to ever receive treatment. At that time, it was believed that the effects of syphilis depended on the race of those affected. Physicians believed that syphilis had a more pronounced effect on African-Americans' cardiovascular systems than on their central nervous systems.

Investigators enrolled in the study a total of 600 impoverished, African-American sharecroppers. Of these men, 399 had latent syphilis, with a control group of 201 men who were not infected. As an incentive for participation in the study, the men were promised free medical care, but were deceived by the PHS, who never informed subjects of their diagnosis, despite the risk of infecting others, and the fact that the disease could lead to blindness, deafness, mental illness, heart disease, bone deterioration, the collapse of the central nervous system, and death. Instead, the men were told that they were being treated for "bad blood", a colloquialism that described various conditions such as syphilis, anemia, and fatigue. The collection of illnesses the term included was a leading cause of death within the southern African-American community.

At the study's commencement, major medical textbooks had recommended that all syphilis be treated, as the consequences were quite severe. Initially, subjects were studied for six to eight months and then treated with contemporary methods, including Salvarsan ("606"), mercurial ointments, and bismuth, which were mildly effective and highly toxic. Additionally, men in the study were administered disguised placebos, ineffective methods, and diagnostic procedures, which were misrepresented as treatments.

Throughout, participants remained ignorant of the study clinicians' true purpose, which was to observe the natural course of untreated syphilis. Study clinicians could have chosen to treat all syphilitic subjects and close the study, or split off a control group for testing with penicillin. Instead, they continued the study without treating any participants; they withheld treatment and information about penicillin from the subjects. In addition, scientists prevented participants from accessing syphilis treatment programs available to other residents in the area. The researchers reasoned that the knowledge gained would benefit humankind; however, it was determined afterward that the doctors did harm their subjects by depriving them of appropriate treatment once it had been discovered. The study was characterized as "the longest non-therapeutic experiment on human beings in medical history."

To ensure that the men would show up for the possibly dangerous, painful, diagnostic, and non-therapeutic spinal taps, doctors sent participants a misleading letter titled "Last Chance for Special Free Treatment".

The U.S. Public Health Service Syphilis Study at Tuskegee published its first clinical data in 1934 and issued its first major report in 1936. This was before the discovery of penicillin as a safe and effective treatment for syphilis. The study was not secret, since reports and data sets were published to the medical community throughout its duration.

During World War II, 256 of the infected subjects registered for the draft and were consequently diagnosed as having syphilis at military induction centers and ordered to obtain treatment for syphilis before they could be taken into the armed services. PHS researchers prevented these men from getting treatment, thus depriving them of chances for a cure. Vonderlehr argued, "this study is of great importance from a scientific standpoint. It represents one of the last opportunities which the science of medicine will have to conduct an investigation of this kind. ... [Study] Doctor [Murray] Smith ... asked that these men be excluded from the list of draftees needing treatment. ... in order to make it possible to continue this study on an effective basis."

Later, Smith, a local PHS representative involved in the study, wrote to Vonderlehr to ask what should be done with patients who had tested negative for syphilis at the time of enrollment in the study and were being used as control subjects but had later tested positive when registering for the draft: "So far, we are keeping the known positive patients from getting treatment. Is a control case of any value to the study, if he has contracted syphilis? Shall we withhold treatment from the control case who has developed syphilis?" Vonderlehr replied that such cases "have lost their value to the study. There is no reason why these patients should not be given appropriate treatment unless you hear from Doctor Austin V. Deibert who is in direct charge of the study".

By 1947, penicillin had become standard therapy for syphilis. The U.S. government sponsored several public health programs to form "rapid treatment centers" to eradicate the disease. When campaigns to eradicate venereal disease came to Macon County, study researchers prevented their subjects from participating. Although some of the men in the study received arsenical or penicillin treatments elsewhere, for most of them this did not amount to "adequate therapy".

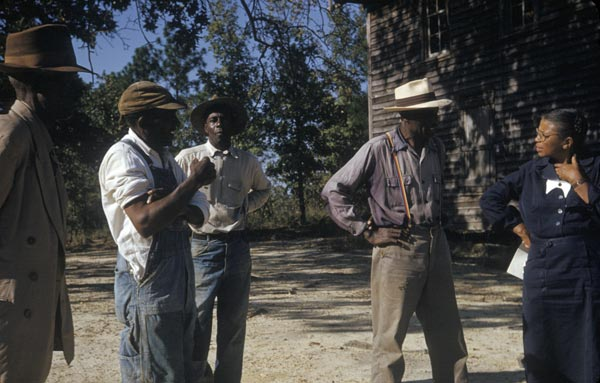
Subjects talking with study coordinator, Nurse Eunice Rivers, c. 1970

By the end of the study in 1972, only 74 of the test subjects were still alive. Of the original 399 men, 28 had died of syphilis, 100 died of related complications, 40 of their wives had been infected, and 19 of their children were born with congenital syphilis.

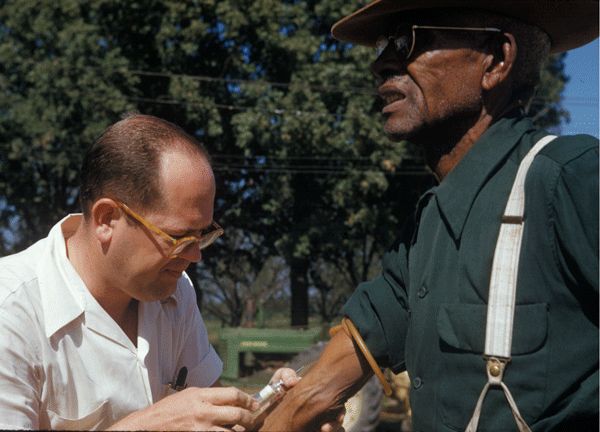
Researcher collecting a blood sample as part of the Tuskegee Syphilis Study

The revelation in 1972 of study failures by 29-year-old whistleblower Peter Buxtun led to major changes in U.S. law and regulation concerning the protection of participants in clinical studies. Studies since then require informed consent, communication of diagnosis and accurate reporting of test results.

=== Study clinicians ===
The venereal disease section of the U.S. Public Health Service (PHS) formed a study group in 1932 at its national headquarters in Washington, D.C. Taliaferro Clark, head of the USPHS, is credited with founding it. His initial goal was to follow untreated syphilis in a group of African-American men for six months to one year, and then follow up with a treatment phase. When the Rosenwald Fund withdrew its financial support, a treatment program was deemed too expensive. Clark, however, decided to continue the study, interested in determining whether syphilis had a different effect on African-Americans than it did on whites. A retrospective study of untreated syphilis in white males had been conducted in Oslo, Norway, and could provide the basis for comparison. The prevailing belief at the time was white people were more likely to develop neurosyphilis and that Black people were more likely to sustain cardiovascular damage. Clark resigned before the study was extended beyond its original length.

Although Clark is usually assigned blame for conceiving the U.S. Public Health Service Syphilis Study at Tuskegee, Thomas Parran Jr. also helped develop a non-treatment study in Macon County, Alabama. As the Health Commissioner of New York State (and former head of the PHS Venereal Disease Division), Parran was asked by the Rosenwald Fund to assess their serological survey of syphilis and demonstration projects in five Southern states. Among his conclusions was the recommendation that: "If one wished to study the natural history of syphilis in the African American race uninfluenced by treatment, this county (Macon) would be an ideal location for such a study."

Oliver C. Wenger was the director of the regional PHS Venereal Disease Clinic in Hot Springs, Arkansas. He and his staff took the lead in developing study procedures. Wenger continued to advise and assist the study when it was adapted as a long-term, no-treatment observational study after funding for treatment was lost.

Raymond A. Vonderlehr was appointed on-site director of the research program and developed the policies that shaped the long-term follow-up section of the project. His method of gaining the "consent" of the subjects for spinal taps (to look for signs of neurosyphilis) was by advertising this diagnostic test as a "special free treatment". He also met with local black doctors and asked them to deny treatment to participants in the Tuskegee Study. Vonderlehr retired as head of the venereal disease section in 1943, shortly after penicillin was proven to cure syphilis. After Vonderlehr's retirement, John R. Heller Jr., his mentee, succeeded him as head of the venereal disease section. Even with the discovery that penicillin served as an effective treatment for syphilis, Heller did not provide the drug to the participants of the study.

Several African-American health workers and educators associated with the Tuskegee Institute played a critical role in the study's progress. The extent to which they knew about the full scope of the study is not clear in all cases. Robert Russa Moton, then president of Tuskegee Institute, and Eugene Dibble, head of the Institute's John A. Andrew Memorial Hospital, both lent their endorsement and institutional resources to the government study.

Nurse Eunice Rivers, who had trained at Tuskegee Institute and worked at its hospital, was recruited at the start of the study to be the main point of contact with the participants. Rivers played a crucial role in the study because she served as the direct link to the regional African-American community. Vonderlehr considered her participation to be the key to gaining the trust of the subjects and promoting their participation. As a part of "Miss Rivers' Lodge", participants would receive free physical examinations at Tuskegee University, free rides to and from the clinic, hot meals on examination days, and free treatment for minor ailments. Rivers was also key in convincing families to sign autopsy agreements in return for funeral benefits. As the study became long-term, Rivers became the chief person who provided continuity to the participants. She was the only study staff person to work with participants for the full 40 years.

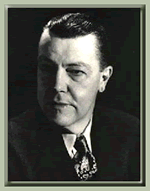
Raymond A. Vonderlehr (medical doctor)

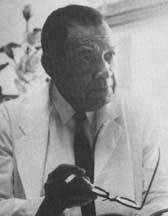
Eugene Dibble (medical doctor)

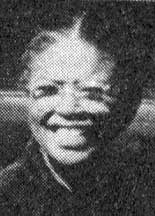
Eunice Rivers (nurse)

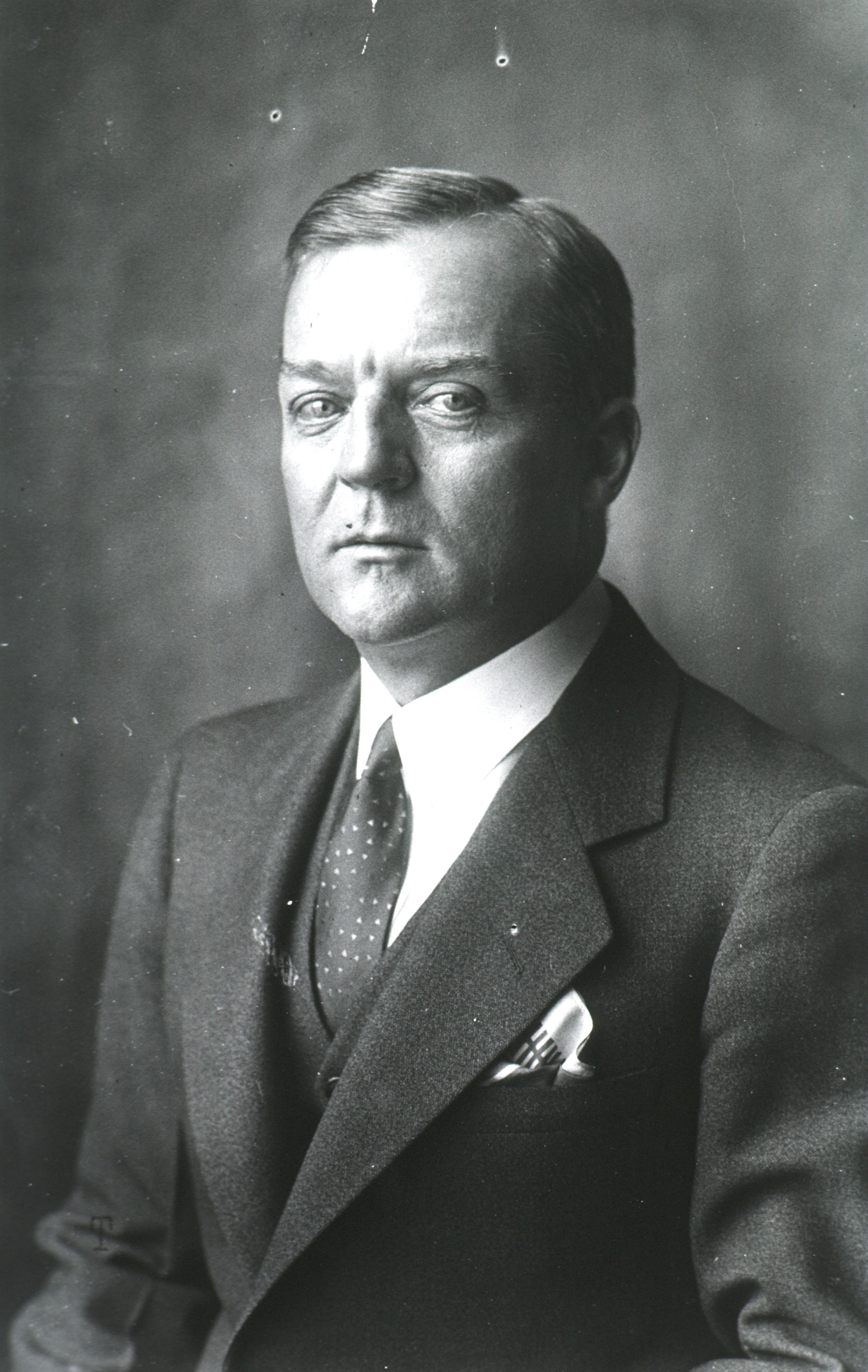
Oliver Wenger

== Study termination ==
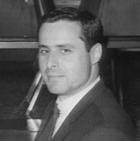
Peter Buxtun, a PHS venereal disease investigator, the whistleblower

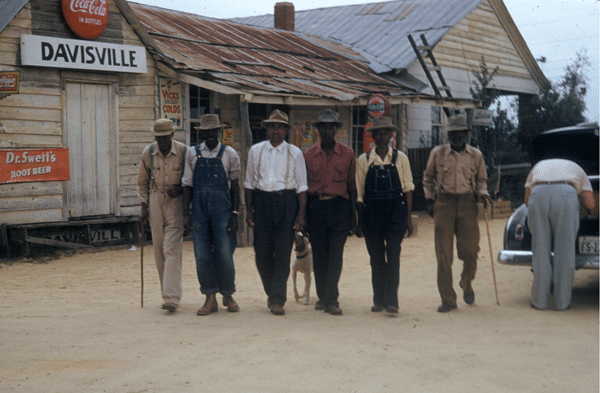
Group of Tuskegee Experiment test subjects

Several men employed by the PHS, namely Austin V. Deibert and Albert P. Iskrant, expressed criticism of the study, primarily on the grounds of poor scientific practice. The first dissenter against the study who was not involved in the PHS was Count Gibson, an associate professor at the Medical College of Virginia in Richmond. He expressed his ethical concerns to PHS's Sidney Olansky in 1955.

Another dissenter was Irwin Schatz, a young Chicago doctor only four years out of medical school. In 1965, Schatz read an article about the study in a medical journal and wrote a letter directly to the study's authors confronting them with a declaration of brazen unethical practice. His letter, read by Anne R. Yobs, one of the study's authors, was immediately ignored and filed away with a brief memo that no reply would be sent.

In 1966, Peter Buxtun, a PHS venereal-disease investigator in San Francisco, sent a letter to the national director of the Division of Venereal Diseases expressing his concerns about the ethics and morality of the extended U.S. Public Health Service Syphilis Study at Tuskegee. The CDC, which by then controlled the study, reaffirmed the need to continue the study until completion; i.e. until all subjects had died and been autopsied. To bolster its position, the CDC received unequivocal support for the continuation of the study, both from local chapters of the National Medical Association (representing African-American physicians) and the American Medical Association (AMA).

In 1968, William Carter Jenkins, an African-American statistician in the PHS and part of the Department of Health, Education, and Welfare (HEW), founded and edited The Drum, a newsletter devoted to ending racial discrimination in HEW. In The Drum, Jenkins called for an end to the study. He did not succeed; it is not clear who read his work.

Buxtun finally went to the press in the early 1970s. The story broke first in the Washington Star on July 25, 1972, reported by Jean Heller of the Associated Press. It became front-page news in the New York Times the following day. Senator Edward Kennedy called Congressional hearings, at which Buxtun and HEW officials testified. As a result of public outcry, the CDC and PHS appointed an ad hoc advisory panel to review the study. The panel found that the men agreed to certain terms of the experiment, such as examination and treatment. However, they were not informed of the study's actual purpose. The panel then determined that the study was medically unjustified and ordered its termination.

In 1974, as part of the settlement of a class action lawsuit filed by the NAACP on behalf of study participants and their descendants, the U.S. government paid the plaintiffs $10 million ($65.3 million in 2025) and agreed to provide free medical treatment to surviving participants and surviving family members infected as a consequence of the study. Congress created a commission empowered to write regulations to deter such abuses from occurring in the future.

A collection of materials compiled to investigate the study is held at the National Library of Medicine in Bethesda, Maryland.

== Aftermath ==
In 1974, Congress passed the National Research Act and created a commission to study and write regulations governing studies involving human participants. Within the United States Department of Health and Human Services, the Office for Human Research Protections (OHRP) was established to oversee clinical trials. As a result, new studies require informed consent, communication of diagnosis and accurate reporting of test results. Institutional review boards (IRBs), including laypeople, are established in scientific research groups and hospitals to review study protocols, protect patient interests, and ensure that participants are fully informed.

In 1994, a multi-disciplinary symposium was held on the U.S. Public Health Service Syphilis Study at Tuskegee, Doing Bad in the Name of Good?: The Tuskegee Syphilis Study and Its Legacy at the University of Virginia. Following that, interested parties formed the Tuskegee Syphilis Study Legacy Committee to develop ideas that had arisen at the symposium, chaired by Vanessa Northington Gamble. It issued its final report in May 1996, having been established at a meeting on January 18–19 of that year. The Committee had two related goals:

1. President Bill Clinton should publicly apologize to the survivors and their community for past government wrongdoing related to the study due to the harm done to the Macon County community and Tuskegee University, and the fears of government and medical abuse the study created among African Americans. No apology had yet been issued at the time.
2. The Committee and relevant federal agencies should develop a strategy to redress the damages, specifically recommending the creation of a center at Tuskegee University for public education about the study, "training programs for health care providers", and a center for the study of ethics in scientific research.

A year later on May 16, 1997, Bill Clinton formally apologized and held a ceremony at the White House for surviving Tuskegee study participants. He said:

What was done cannot be undone. But we can end the silence. We can stop turning our heads away. We can look at you in the eye and finally say on behalf of the American people, what the United States government did was shameful, and I am sorry... To our African American citizens, I am sorry that your federal government orchestrated a study so clearly racist.

Five of the eight study survivors attended the White House ceremony.

The presidential apology led to progress in addressing the second goal of the Legacy Committee. The federal government contributed to establishing the National Center for Bioethics in Research and Health Care at Tuskegee, which officially opened in 1999 to explore issues that underlie research and medical care of African Americans and other under-served people.

In 2009, the Legacy Museum opened in the Bioethics Center, to honor the hundreds of participants of the Tuskegee Study of Untreated Syphilis in the African American Male.

In June 2022, the Milbank Memorial Fund apologized to descendants of the study's victims for its the role in the study.

=== Study participants ===
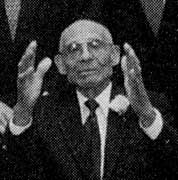
Charlie Pollard, survivor

The five survivors who attended the White House ceremony in 1997 were Charlie Pollard, Herman Shaw, Carter Howard, Fred Simmons, and Frederick Moss. The remaining three survivors had family members attend the ceremony in their name. Sam Doner was represented by his daughter, Gwendolyn Cox; Ernest Hendon by his brother, North Hendon; and George Key by his grandson, Christopher Monroe. The last man who was a participant in the study died in 2004.

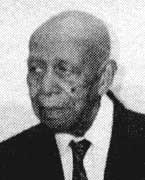
Herman Shaw, survivor

Charlie Pollard appealed to civil rights attorney Fred D. Gray, who also attended the White House ceremony, for help when he learned the true nature of the study he had been participating in for years. In 1973, Pollard v. United States resulted in a $10 million settlement.

Another participant of the study was Freddie Lee Tyson, a sharecropper who helped build Moton Field, where the legendary "Tuskegee Airmen" learned to fly during World War II.

== Legacy ==
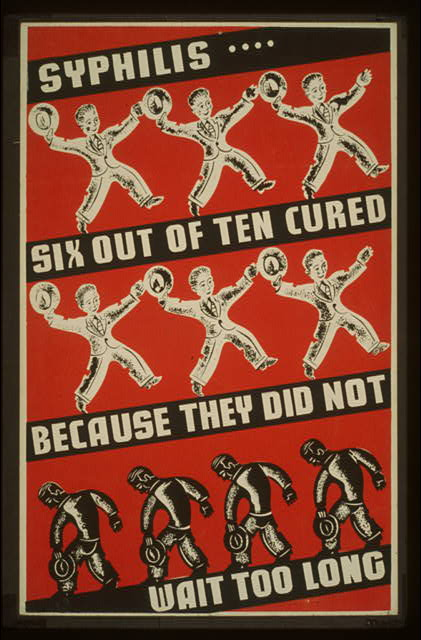
Depression-era U.S. poster advocating early syphilis treatment. Although treatments were available, participants in the study did not receive them.

=== Scientific failings ===
Aside from a study of racial differences, one of the main goals that researchers in the study wanted to accomplish was to determine the extent to which treatment for syphilis was necessary and at what point in the progression of the disease it should be treated. For this reason, the study emphasized observation of individuals with late latent syphilis. However, despite clinicians' attempts to justify the study as necessary for science, the study itself was not conducted in a scientifically viable way. Because participants were treated with mercury rubs, injections of neoarsphenamine, protiodide, Salvarsan, and bismuth, the study did not follow subjects whose syphilis was untreated, however minimally effective these treatments may have been.

Austin V. Deibert of the PHS recognized that since the study's main goal had been compromised in this way, the results would be meaningless and impossible to manipulate statistically. Even the toxic treatments that were available before the availability of penicillin, according to Deibert, could "greatly lower, if not prevent, late syphilitic cardiovascular disease ... [while] increas[ing] the incidence of neuro-recurrence and other forms of relapse." Despite their effectiveness, these treatments were never prescribed to the participants.

=== Racism ===
The conception which lay behind the U.S. Public Health Service Syphilis Study at Tuskegee in 1932, in which 100% of its participants were poor, rural African-American men with very limited access to health information, reflects the racial attitudes in the U.S. at that time. The clinicians who led the study assumed that African-Americans were particularly susceptible to venereal diseases because of their race, and they assumed that the study's participants were not interested in receiving medical treatment.

Taliaferro Clark said, "The rather low intelligence of the Negro population, depressed economic conditions, and the common promiscuous sex relations not only contribute to the spread of syphilis but the prevailing indifference with regards to treatment." In reality, the promise of medical treatment, usually reserved only for emergencies among the rural black population of Macon County, Alabama, was what secured subjects' cooperation in the study.

=== Public trust ===
The revelations of mistreatment under the U.S. Public Health Service Syphilis Study at Tuskegee are believed to have significantly damaged the trust of the black community toward public health efforts in the United States. Observers believe that the abuses of the study may have contributed to the reluctance of many poor black people to seek routine preventive care. A 1999 survey showed that 80% of African-American men wrongly believed the men in the study had been injected with syphilis.

While the final report of the Tuskegee Syphilis Study Legacy Committee noted that the study had contributed to fears among the African American community of abuse and exploitation by government officials and medical professionals, medical mistreatment of African Americans and resulting mistrust predates the Tuskegee Syphilis Study. Vanessa Northington Gamble, who had chaired the committee, addressed this in a seminal article published in 1997 after President Clinton's apology. She argued that while the Tuskegee Syphilis Study contributed to African Americans' continuing mistrust of the biomedical community, the study was not the most important reason. She called attention to a broader historical and social context that had already negatively influenced community attitudes, including countless prior medical injustices before the study's start in 1932. These dated back to the antebellum period, when slaves had been used for unethical and harmful experiments including tests of endurance against and remedies for heatstroke and experimental gynecological surgeries without anesthesia. African Americans' graves were robbed to provide cadavers for dissection, a practice that continued, along with other abuses, after the American Civil War.

A 2016 paper by Marcella Alsan and Marianne Wanamaker found "that the historical disclosure of the [Tuskegee experiment] in 1972 is correlated with increases in medical mistrust and mortality and decreases in both outpatient and inpatient physician interactions for older black men. Our estimates imply life expectancy at age 45 for black men fell by up to 1.4 years in response to the disclosure, accounting for approximately 35% of the 1980 life expectancy gap between black and white men." The authors further observed that the decline also represented 25% of the gender gap in Black life expectancy at that time. The authors noted that the extent of this effect was comparable to major public health benchmarks, such as eliminating smoking or the impact of the Great Migration on life expectancy. Aslan and Wanamaker's study provides evidence that reduced trust in medical institutions was fueled by the Tuskegee disclosure, having measurable effects on health attitudes and outcomes on the Black community.

Studies that have investigated the willingness of black Americans to participate in medical studies have not drawn consistent conclusions related to the willingness and participation in studies by racial minorities. The Tuskegee Legacy Project Questionnaire found that, even though black Americans are four times more likely to know about the syphilis trials than are whites, they are two to three times more willing to participate in biomedical studies. Some of the factors that continue to limit the credibility of these few studies is how awareness differs significantly across studies. For instance, it appears that the rates of awareness differ as a function of the method of assessment. Study participants who reported awareness of the Tuskegee syphilis study are often misinformed about the results and issues, and awareness of the study is not reliably associated with unwillingness to participate in scientific research.

Distrust of the government, in part formed through the study, contributed to persistent rumors during the 1980s in the black community that the government was responsible for the HIV/AIDS crisis by having deliberately introduced the virus to the black community as some kind of experiment. In February 1992 on ABC's Prime Time Live, journalist Jay Schadler interviewed Sidney Olansky, Public Health Services director of the study from 1950 to 1957. When asked about the lies that were told to the study subjects, Olansky said, "The fact that they were illiterate was helpful, too, because they couldn't read the newspapers. If they were not, as things moved on they might have been reading newspapers and seen what was going on."

On January 3, 2019, a United States federal judge stated that Johns Hopkins University, Bristol-Myers Squibb and the Rockefeller Foundation must face a $1 billion lawsuit for their roles in a similar experiment affecting Guatemalans. In 2001, a court compared the Kennedy Krieger Institute's Lead-Based Paint Abatement and Repair and Maintenance Study to the Tuskegee experiments.

Some African Americans have been hesitant to get vaccinated against COVID-19 due to the Tuskegee experiments. In September 2021, the right-wing group America's Frontline Doctors, which has promoted COVID-19 conspiracy theories and misinformation, filed a lawsuit against New York City, claiming that its vaccine passport health orders were inherently discriminatory against African Americans due to the "historical context".

== Ethical implications ==
The U.S. Public Health Service Syphilis Study at Tuskegee highlighted issues in race and science. The aftershocks of this study, and other human experiments in the United States, led to the establishment of the National Commission for the Protection of Human Subjects of Biomedical and Behavioral Research and the National Research Act. The latter requires the establishment of institutional review boards (IRBs) at institutions receiving federal support (such as grants, cooperative agreements, or contracts). Foreign consent procedures can be substituted which offer similar protections and must be submitted to the Federal Register unless a statute or Executive Order requires otherwise.

In the period following World War II, the revelation of the Holocaust and related Nazi medical abuses brought about changes in international law. Western allies formulated the Nuremberg Code to protect the rights of research subjects. In 1964, the World Medical Association's Declaration of Helsinki specified that experiments involving human beings needed the "informed consent" of participants. In spite of these events, the protocols of the study were not re-evaluated according to the new standards, even though whether or not the study should continue was re-evaluated several times (including in 1969 by the CDC). U.S. government officials and medical professionals kept silent and the study did not end until 1972, nearly three decades after the Nuremberg trials.

Writer James Jones said that the physicians were fixated on African-American sexuality. They believed that African-Americans willingly had sexual relations with infected persons (although no one had been told his diagnosis). Due to the lack of information, the participants were manipulated into continuing the study without full knowledge of their role or their choices. Since the late 20th century, IRBs established in association with clinical studies requirements that all involved in the study be willing and voluntary participants.

The Tuskegee University Legacy Museum has on display a check issued by the United States government on behalf of Dan Carlis to Lloyd Clements, Jr., a descendant of one of the U.S. Public Health Service Syphilis Study at Tuskegee participants. Lloyd Clements, Jr.'s great-grandfather Dan Carlis and two of his uncles, Ludie Clements and Sylvester Carlis, were in the study. Original legal paperwork for Sylvester Carlis related to the study is on display at the museum as well. Lloyd Clements, Jr. has worked with noted historian Susan Reverby concerning his family's involvement with the U.S. Public Health Service Syphilis Study at Tuskegee.

== Society and culture ==
Comics

- Truth: Red, White, and Black (published January–July 2003) is a seven-issue Marvel comic book series inspired by the Tuskegee trials. Written as a prequel to the Captain America series, Truth: Red, White, and Black explores the exploitation of certain races for scientific research, as in the Tuskegee syphilis trials.

Theater

- David Feldshuh's stage play Miss Evers' Boys (1992), based on the history of the U.S. Public Health Service Syphilis Study at Tuskegee, was a runner-up for the 1992 Pulitzer Prize in drama.

Music

- The lyrics of Gil Scott-Heron's 33-second song, "Tuskeegee #626", featured on the Bridges (1977) LP, details and condemns the U.S. Public Health Service Syphilis Study at Tuskegee.
- Frank Zappa's 1984 album Thing Fish was heavily inspired by the events of the Tuskegee Syphilis Study.
- Avant-garde metal band Zeal & Ardor's song "Tuskegee", from the 2020 EP Wake of a Nation, is about the Tuskegee Syphilis Study.
- Jazz musician Don Byron's 1992 album Tuskegee Experiments was inspired by the study.
- Atlanta-based rapper JID juxtaposes his life to the Tuskegee Experiment in his 2021 song "Skegee".

Television

- The 1992 Secret History series documentary "Bad Blood" is about the experiment.
- Miss Evers' Boys (1997), a TV adaptation of David Feldshuh's eponymous 1992 stage play, was nominated for 11 Emmy Awards and won in four categories.

Video production

- Medical Racism: The New Apartheid (2021) exploits the Tuskegee trials to promote COVID-19 misinformation.

== See also ==
- John Charles Cutler
- Declaration of Geneva
- Eugenics in the United States
- Kennedy Krieger Institute's Lead-Based Paint Abatement and Repair and Maintenance Study
- Guatemala syphilis experiments
- Human experimentation in North Korea
- Human subject research
- International Conference on Harmonisation of Technical Requirements for Registration of Pharmaceuticals for Human Use
- Bill Jenkins (epidemiologist)
- Medical Apartheid
- Operation Whitecoat
- Project 4.1
- Race and health in the United States
- Shiloh Missionary Baptist Church
- Unethical human experimentation
- Unit 731
- World Medical Association
